= 2023 U-20 Africa Cup of Nations qualification =

2023 Africa U-20 Cup of Nations qualification
Tournament details
- Host countries: Egypt (North Zone); Mauritania (West A Zone); Niger (West B Zone); Congo (Central Zone); Sudan (Central-East Zone); Eswatini (South Zone)
- Dates: 7 May – 14 December 2022
- Teams: 46

Tournament statistics
- Matches played: 79
- Goals scored: 212 (2.68 per match)
- Top scorer(s): (Angola) Danilson Makokisa (5 goals)

The 2023 U-20 Africa Cup of Nations qualification was a men's under-20 football competition which decided the participating teams of the 2023 Africa U-20 Cup of Nations.

Players born 1 January 2003 or later were eligible to participate in the competition. A total of twelve teams qualified to play in the final tournament, including Egypt who qualified automatically as hosts.

== Teams ==
Zone	Spots	Teams entering qualification	Did not enter
North Zone (UNAF)	1 spot + hosts	Algeria; Libya; Morocco; **Tunisia**	**Egypt** **(Q, H)**
West A Zone (WAFU-UFOA A)	2 spot	Cape Verde; **Gambia**; Guinea; Guinea-Bissau; Liberia; Mali; Mauritania **(H)**; **Senegal**; Sierra Leone	
West B Zone (WAFU-UFOA B)	2 spots	**Benin**; Burkina Faso; Ghana; Ivory Coast; Niger **(H)**; **Nigeria**; Togo	
Central Zone (UNIFFAC)	2 spots	Cameroon; **Central African Republic**; Chad **(W)** (Note: Chad, Equatorial Guinea & Sao Tome and Principe withdrew from the qualifiers after the group stage draw was conducted.); **Congo (H)**; DR Congo; Equatorial Guinea **(W)**; São Tomé and Príncipe **(W)**	Gabon
Central-East Zone (CECAFA)	2 spots	Burundi; Djibouti; Ethiopia; **South Sudan**; Sudan **(H)**; Tanzania; **Uganda**	Eritrea; Kenya; Rwanda; Somalia
South Zone (COSAFA)	2 spots	Angola; Botswana; Comoros; Eswatini **(H)**; Lesotho; Malawi; Mauritius; **Mozambique**; Namibia; Seychelles; South Africa; **Zambia**	Madagascar; Zimbabwe

Notes

- Teams in **bold** qualified for the final tournament.
- (H): Qualifying tournament hosts
- (Q): Automatically qualified for final tournament regardless of qualification results
- (W): Withdrew

== Schedule ==
The qualifying competition was split into regional competitions, with the teams entering the qualifying tournament of their zone. The schedule of each qualifying zone was as follows.

Zone	Group stage	Knockout stage
West B Zone	7–14 May 2022	17–20 May 2022
West A Zone	28 August–6 September 2022	9–11 September 2022
South Zone	7–12 October 2022	14–16 October 2022
North Zone	18–24 October 2022	—N/a
Central-East Zone	28 October–5 November 2022	8–11 November 2022
Central Zone	8–14 December 2022	—N/a

== North Zone ==
The 2022 UNAF U-20 Tournament, which also served as the qualifiers for the Africa U-20 Cup of Nations, took place between 18 and 24 October 2022 in Suez, Egypt. The draw for the fixtures was held on 20 July 2022. The four teams were placed in one group, with the winner qualifying for the final tournament.

All times are local, EGY (UTC+2).

Pos	Team	Pld	W	D	L	GF	GA	GD	Pts	Qualification
1	Tunisia	3	1	2	0	5	4	+1	5	2023 Africa U-20 Cup of Nations
2	Libya	3	1	1	1	2	2	0	4 (Note: Head-to-head result: Morocco 0–1 Libya.)	
3	Morocco	3	1	1	1	2	1	+1	4	
4	Algeria	3	0	2	1	5	7	−2	2	

Source: UNAF
Rules for classification: 1) Points; 2) Goal difference; 3) Goals scored
Notes:
18 October 2022
15:00

Morocco	0–0	Tunisia
	Report

Suez Stadium, Suez
Referee: Omar Artan (Somalia)
18 October 2022
18:00

Libya	1–1	Algeria
Bouchiba 61'	Report	Dehilis 90+4'

Suez Stadium, Suez
Referee: Naim Hosni (Tunisia)

21 October 2022
15:00

Algeria	0–2	Morocco
	Report	Lantaki 37'; Sadik 90+6'

Suez Stadium, Suez
Referee: Mahmoud El Banna (Egypt)
21 October 2022
18:00

Tunisia	1–0	Libya
Jertila 78'	Report

Suez Stadium, Suez
Referee: Jalal Jayed (Morocco)

24 October 2022
15:00

Algeria	4–4	Tunisia
Aitamer 34'; Hamadi 80', 90+3'; Boulbina 82'	Report	Derbali 19'; Abid 26'; Snana 36'; Jertila 67'

Suez Stadium, Suez
Referee: Omar Artan (Somalia)
24 October 2022
15:00

Morocco	0–1	Libya
	Report	Al Hbishi 81'

Egyptian Army Stadium, Suez

== West A Zone ==
The WAFU-UFOA Zone A qualifiers for the Africa U-20 Cup of Nations were hosted by Mauritania with the matches played between 28 August–11 September 2022. The matches were played at Nouakchott, Mauritania.

All times are local, GMT (UTC+0).

=== Group stage ===
The seven teams were drawn into two groups of four and five teams. The winners and the runners-up of each group advanced to the semi-finals.

Group A

Pos	Team	Pld	W	D	L	GF	GA	GD	Pts	Qualification
1	Mali	3	2	1	0	6	1	+5	7	Semi-finals
2	Mauritania (H)	3	2	1	0	5	2	+3	7	Semi-finals
3	Sierra Leone	3	1	0	2	4	6	−2	3	
4	Guinea-Bissau	3	0	0	3	2	8	−6	0	

Rules for classification: Group tiebreakers
(H) Hosts
30 August 2022
17:30

Mauritania	2–1	Guinea-Bissau
Abou 58'; Ahmed 82'	Report	J. da Silva 21'

Stade Cheikha Ould Boïdiya, Nouakchott
Referee: Alioune Sandigui (Senegal)
30 August 2022
20:30

Sierra Leone	0–3	Mali
	Report	A. Camara 4', 23'; Koïta 33'

Stade Cheikha Ould Boïdiya, Nouakchott
Referee: Younoussa Camara (Guinea)

3 September 2022
17:30

Sierra Leone	0–2	Mauritania
	Report	Ahmed 41'; M'Bareck 76'

Stade Cheikha Ould Boïdiya, Nouakchott
Referee: Emmanuel Mensah (Liberia)
3 September 2022
20:30

Mali	2–0	Guinea-Bissau
Sanogo 69'; Berthé 89'	Report

Stade Cheikha Ould Boïdiya, Nouakchott
Referee: Isatou Touray (Gambia)

5 September 2022
18:00

Guinea-Bissau	1–4	Sierra Leone
Camará 42'	Report	M. Kamara 45+2' (pen.), 56'; Lamin 65'; Fofanah 79'

Stade Olympique, Nouakchott
Referee: Alioune Sandigui (Senegal)
5 September 2022
18:00

Mali	1–1	Mauritania
Dembélé 47'	Report	Magassa 87'

Stade Cheikha Ould Boïdiya, Nouakchott
Referee: Abdoulaye Manet (Guinea)

Group B

Pos	Team	Pld	W	D	L	GF	GA	GD	Pts	Qualification
1	Senegal	4	3	1	0	9	3	+6	10	Semi-finals
2	Gambia	4	2	1	1	6	2	+4	7	Semi-finals
3	Guinea	4	2	1	1	9	6	+3	7	
4	Cape Verde	4	1	0	3	2	10	−8	3	
5	Liberia	4	0	1	3	7	12	−5	1	

Rules for classification: Group tiebreakers
28 August 2022
17:30

Cape Verde	2–1	Liberia
Tutucho 7' (pen.); Maurício 41'	Report	Teah 9'

Stade Cheikha Ould Boïdiya, Nouakchott
Referee: Ousmane Diakaté (Mali)
28 August 2022
20:30

Senegal	3–1	Guinea
Ngom 11'; M. Mbaye 23'; Basse 41'	Report	Bangoura 45+1'

Stade Cheikha Ould Boïdiya, Nouakchott
Referee: Babacar Sarr (Mauritania)

30 August 2022
17:30

Gambia	2–0	Cape Verde
Sowe 24', 74'	Report

Stade Olympique, Nouakchott
Referee: Moussa Diou (Mauritania)
30 August 2022
20:30

Liberia	2–2	Senegal
Gono 38', 79'	Report	S. Diallo 21'; P. Diallo 32'

Stade Olympique, Nouakchott
Referee: Sory Ibrahima Keita (Mali)

1 September 2022
17:30

Guinea	4–0	Cape Verde
Bangoura 15'; A. Bah 18'; A. Camara 61'; Touré 71'	Report

Stade Cheikha Ould Boïdiya, Nouakchott
Referee: Ousmane Diakaté (Mali)
1 September 2022
20:30

Gambia	4–1	Liberia
Bojang 17'; Faal 33'; Jobe 51'; Mbye 88'	Report	Teah 21'

Stade Cheikha Ould Boïdiya, Nouakchott
Referee: Mohamed Koroma (Sierra Leone)

3 September 2022
17:30

Senegal	3–0	Cape Verde
P. Diallo 7'; Ngom 76' (pen.); Diop 80'	Report

Stade Olympique, Nouakchott
Referee: Moussa Diou (Mauritania)
3 September 2022
20:30

Gambia	0–0	Guinea
	Report

Stade Olympique, Nouakchott
Referee: Babacar Sarr (Mauritania)

6 September 2022
18:00

Liberia	3–4	Guinea
Harrison 9', 66' (pen.); Teah 71'	Report	Touré 7', 29'; M. Camara 39'; Keita 45+2'

Stade Olympique, Nouakchott
Referee: Sory Ibrahima Keita (Mali)
6 September 2022
18:00

Senegal	1–0	Gambia
S. Diallo 6' (pen.)	Report

Stade Cheikha Ould Boïdiya, Nouakchott
Referee: Ousmane Diakaté (Mali)

=== Knockout stage ===
Winners qualified for 2023 Africa U-20 Cup of Nations.

Semi-finals
9 September – Cheikha Boïdiya
Mali	1 (2)
Gambia (p)	1 (4)
9 September – Cheikha Boïdiya
Senegal	4
Mauritania	1

Final
11 September – Cheikha Boïdiya
Gambia	0
Senegal	1

Semi-finals

9 September 2022
17:30

Mali	1–1 (a.e.t.)	Gambia
A. Camara 23'	Report	Gibba 83'
Penalties
M. Camara (penalty scored); M. Traoré (penalty scored); Sanogo (penalty missed); C. Keita (penalty missed)	2–4	(penalty scored) Saine; (penalty scored) Mbye; (penalty scored) Gibba; (penalty missed) Colley; (penalty scored) Saidykhan

Stade Cheikha Ould Boïdiya, Nouakchott
Referee: Emmanuel Mensah (Liberia)
9 September 2022
20:30

Senegal	4–1	Mauritania
P. Diallo 4'; S. Diallo 18'; Diouf 74', 76'	Report	Ahmed 64'

Stade Cheikha Ould Boïdiya, Nouakchott
Referee: Abdoulaye Manet (Guinea)

Final

11 September 2022
18:00

Gambia	0–1	Senegal
	Report	S. Diallo 63'

Stade Cheikha Ould Boïdiya, Nouakchott
Referee: Abdoulaye Manet (Guinea)

== West B Zone ==
The WAFU-UFOA Zone B qualifiers for the Africa U-20 Cup of Nations were hosted by Niger with the matches played between 7–20 May 2022. The draw was announced on 15 April 2022.

All times are local, WAT (UTC+1).

=== Group stage ===
The seven teams were drawn into two groups of three and four teams. The winners and the runners-up of each group advanced to the semi-finals.

Group A

Pos	Team	Pld	W	D	L	GF	GA	GD	Pts	Qualification
1	Benin	3	2	1	0	2	0	+2	7	Semi-finals
2	Ivory Coast	3	2	0	1	3	1	+2	6	Semi-finals
3	Niger (H)	3	1	1	1	1	1	0	4	
4	Togo	3	0	0	3	0	4	−4	0	

Rules for classification: Group tiebreakers
(H) Hosts
7 May 2022
17:00

Niger	0–1	Ivory Coast
	Report	Traoré 52'

Stade Général Seyni Kountché, Niamey
Referee: Issa Mouhamed (Benin)
7 May 2022
20:00

Togo	0–1	Benin
	Report	Edou 61'

Stade Général Seyni Kountché, Niamey
Referee: Charles Bulu (Ghana)

10 May 2022
17:00

Ivory Coast	2–0	Togo
Traoré 7', 74'	Report

Stade Général Seyni Kountché, Niamey
Referee: Joseph Ogabor (Nigeria)
10 May 2022
20:00

Benin	0–0	Niger
	Report

Stade Général Seyni Kountché, Niamey
Referee: Hamidou Diero (Burkina Faso)

13 May 2022
16:45

Benin	1–0	Ivory Coast
Assolohan 34'	Report

Stade Municipal, Niamey
Referee: Vincentia Amedome (Togo)
13 May 2022
16:45

Niger	1–0	Togo
Salifou 2'	Report

Stade Général Seyni Kountché, Niamey
Referee: Clement Franklin Kpan (Ivory Coast)

Group B

Pos	Team	Pld	W	D	L	GF	GA	GD	Pts	Qualification
1	Nigeria	2	1	1	0	4	2	+2	4	Semi-finals
2	Burkina Faso	2	1	1	0	4	3	+1	4	Semi-finals
3	Ghana	2	0	0	2	1	4	−3	0	

Rules for classification: Group tiebreakers
8 May 2022
17:00

Ghana	0–2	Nigeria
	Report	Muhammad 5'; Abdullahi 72'

Stade Général Seyni Kountché, Niamey
Referee: Clement Franklin Kpan (Ivory Coast)

11 May 2022
17:00

Nigeria	2–2	Burkina Faso
Muhammad 24'; Yahaya 70' (pen.)	Report	Zagré 60' (pen.); Kalou 82'

Stade Général Seyni Kountché, Niamey
Referee: Moussa Ahmadou Alou (Niger)

14 May 2022
16:45

Burkina Faso	2–1	Ghana
Ky 33'; Zagré 90+3'	Report	Sarfo 45'

Stade Général Seyni Kountché, Niamey
Referee: Komlanvi Aklassou (Togo)

=== Knockout stage ===
Semi-finals
17 May – Général Seyni Kountché
Benin	2
Burkina Faso	1
17 May – Général Seyni Kountché
Nigeria	2
Ivory Coast	1

Final
20 May – Général Seyni Kountché
Benin	1
Nigeria	3
Third place
20 May – Général Seyni Kountché
Burkina Faso	2
Ivory Coast	0

Semi-finals

Winners qualified for 2023 Africa U-20 Cup of Nations.

17 May 2022
17:00

Benin	2–1	Burkina Faso
Tonguï 95'; Ibrahim 112'	Report	Dao 120'

Stade Général Seyni Kountché, Niamey
Referee: Moussa Ahmadou Alou (Niger)
17 May 2022
20:30

Nigeria	2–1	Ivory Coast
Daga 4'; Yahaya 109' (pen.)	Report	Traoré 44'

Stade Général Seyni Kountché, Niamey
Referee: Charles Bulu (Ghana)

Third place

20 May 2022
17:00

Burkina Faso	2–0	Ivory Coast
Dicko 15', 53'	Report

Stade Général Seyni Kountché, Niamey
Referee: Issa Mouhamed (Benin)

Final

20 May 2022
20:30

Benin	1–3	Nigeria
Edou 83'	Report	Ojo 38' (pen.), 68'; Muhammad 78'

Stade Général Seyni Kountché, Niamey
Referee: Hamidou Diero (Burkina Faso)

== Central Zone ==
The UNIFFAC qualifiers for the Africa U-20 Cup of Nations were held in Congo between 8–14 December 2022.

The seven participating teams were drawn into two groups of four and three teams, with Congo, DR Congo, the Central African Republic and São Tomé and Príncipe drawn in Group A; and Cameroon, Chad and Equatorial Guinea drawn into Group B. However, on 25 November, São Tomé and Príncipe withdrew from the competition, with Chad and Equatorial Guinea following suit.

The four remaining teams were then placed in one group with the winners and the runners-up qualifying for the final tournament.

All times are local, WAT (UTC+1).

Pos	Team	Pld	W	D	L	GF	GA	GD	Pts	Qualification
1	Congo (H)	3	2	1	0	7	2	+5	7	2023 Africa U-20 Cup of Nations
2	Central African Republic	3	2	0	1	3	3	0	6	2023 Africa U-20 Cup of Nations
3	Cameroon	3	0	2	1	2	3	−1	2	
4	DR Congo	3	0	1	2	1	5	−4	1	

Rules for classification: Group tiebreakers
(H) Hosts
8 December 2022
15:00

Congo	1–1	Cameroon
Ndecket 38'	Report	Kaïba 26' (pen.)

Stade Alphonse Massemba-Débat, Brazzaville
8 December 2022
18:00

DR Congo	0–1	Central African Republic
	Report	Gbenou 30'

Stade Alphonse Massemba-Débat, Brazzaville

11 December 2022
15:00

Central African Republic	1–3	Congo
Gbenou 4'	Report	Nguesso 2'; Bassinga 45+2'; Loulendo 90+6'

Stade Alphonse Massemba-Débat, Brazzaville
11 December 2022
18:00

Cameroon	1–1	DR Congo
Bil 45+3'	Report	Malanaga 60'

Stade Alphonse Massemba-Débat, Brazzaville

14 December 2022
15:00

Central African Republic	1–0	Cameroon
Pougui 47'	Report

Stade Alphonse Massemba-Débat, Brazzaville
14 December 2022
18:00

Congo	3–0	DR Congo
Nguesso 15'; Bassinga 59'; Sousou 85' (pen.)	Report

Stade Alphonse Massemba-Débat, Brazzaville

== Central-East Zone ==
The CECAFA qualifiers for the Africa U-20 Cup of Nations were hosted by Sudan between 28 October and 11 November 2022. The draw for the fixtures was held on 11 October 2022.

All times are local, CAT (UTC+2).

=== Group stage ===
The seven teams were drawn into two groups of three and four teams. The winners and the runners-up of each group advanced to the semi-finals.

Group A

Pos	Team	Pld	W	D	L	GF	GA	GD	Pts	Qualification
1	Sudan (H)	3	2	1	0	2	0	+2	7	Semi-finals
2	South Sudan	3	1	2	0	1	0	+1	5	Semi-finals
3	Burundi	3	1	1	1	5	1	+4	4	
4	Djibouti	3	0	0	3	0	7	−7	0	

Rules for classification: Group tiebreakers
(H) Hosts
28 October 2022
16:00

Djibouti	0–5	Burundi
	Report	Nibikora 62', 77', 82'; Nimbona 63'; Nkurunziza 84'

Al-Hilal Stadium, Omdurman
Referee: William Oloya (Uganda)
28 October 2022
19:00

Sudan	0–0	South Sudan
	Report

Al-Hilal Stadium, Omdurman
Referee: Retselisitsoe Molise (Lesotho)

1 November 2022
16:00

Burundi	0–0	South Sudan
	Report

Al-Hilal Stadium, Omdurman
Referee: Haileyesus Bazezew (Ethiopia)
1 November 2022
19:00

Djibouti	0–1	Sudan
	Report	Toto 23'

Al-Hilal Stadium, Omdurman
Referee: Abdulwahid Huraywidah (Libya)

5 November 2022
16:00

South Sudan	1–0	Djibouti
Loro 80' (pen.)	Report

Kober Stadium, Khartoum
Referee: Retselisitsoe Molise (Lesotho)
5 November 2022
16:00

Burundi	0–1	Sudan
	Report	Omar 75'

Al-Hilal Stadium, Omdurman
Referee: Tuoniféré Soro (Ivory Coast)

Group B

Pos	Team	Pld	W	D	L	GF	GA	GD	Pts	Qualification
1	Ethiopia	2	1	1	0	3	2	+1	4	Semi-finals
2	Uganda	2	1	0	1	2	1	+1	3	Semi-finals
3	Tanzania	2	0	1	1	2	4	−2	1	

Rules for classification: Group tiebreakers
29 October 2022
18:00

Uganda	2–0	Tanzania
Ssematimba 32'; Mugisha 35'	Report

Al-Hilal Stadium, Omdurman
Referee: Tuoniféré Soro (Ivory Coast)

2 November 2022
18:00

Tanzania	2–2	Ethiopia
Mhilu 20'; Makambo 48'	Report	Tarekegn 31'; Ali 87'

Al-Hilal Stadium, Omdurman
Referee: Thierry Nkurunziza (Burundi)

5 November 2022
19:00

Ethiopia	1–0	Uganda
Ali 60'	Report

Al-Hilal Stadium, Omdurman
Referee: Abdalaziz Estalgoo (Sudan)

=== Knockout stage ===
Semi-finals
8 November – Al-Hilal Stadium
Ethiopia	2 (2)
South Sudan (p)	2 (4)
8 November – Kober Stadium
Sudan	0
Uganda	2

Final
11 November – Al-Hilal Stadium
South Sudan	1
Uganda	2
Third place
11 November – Al-Hilal Stadium
Ethiopia	1
Sudan	2

Semi-finals

Winners qualified for 2023 Africa U-20 Cup of Nations.

8 November 2022
20:00

Sudan	0–2	Uganda
	Report	Torach 56'; Mugulusi 71'

Kober Stadium, Khartoum
Referee: Saddam Mansour (Djibouti)
8 November 2022
20:00

Ethiopia	2–2 (a.e.t.)	South Sudan
Tarekegn 9' (pen.); Abate 107'	Report	Loro 18' (pen.); Felix 111'
Penalties
Wabela (penalty scored); Abate (penalty missed); Shamena (penalty missed); Dawit (penalty scored)	2–4	(penalty scored) Talafun; (penalty missed) Lual; (penalty scored) Lukciir; (penalty scored) Loro; (penalty scored) Sebit

Al-Hilal Stadium, Omdurman
Referee: Abdulwahid Huraywidah (Libya)

Third place

11 November 2022
16:00

Ethiopia	1–2	Sudan
Gezahegn 56'	Report	Legese 38' (o.g.); Ali 62'

Al-Hilal Stadium, Omdurman
Referee: William Oloya (Uganda)

Final

11 November 2022
19:30

South Sudan	1–2	Uganda
Felix 15'	Report	Bugembe 22'; Ssematimba 62'

Al-Hilal Stadium, Omdurman
Referee: Abdalaziz Estalgoo (Sudan)

== South Zone ==
The COSAFA qualifiers for the Africa U-20 Cup of Nations were hosted by Eswatini between 7–16 October 2022.

All times are local, SAST (UTC+2).

=== Group stage ===
The twelve teams were drawn into three groups of four teams. The winners from each group and the best runners-up advanced to the semi-finals.

Group A

Pos	Team	Pld	W	D	L	GF	GA	GD	Pts	Qualification
1	Zambia	3	3	0	0	6	0	+6	9	Semi-finals
2	Eswatini (H)	3	2	0	1	9	3	+6	6	
3	Botswana	3	1	0	2	2	3	−1	3	
4	Mauritius	3	0	0	3	0	11	−11	0	

Source: COSAFA.com
(H) Hosts
7 October 2022
12:00

Zambia	3–0	Mauritius
Chipyoka 20' (pen.); Ng'ambi 81', 90'	Report

Somhlolo National Stadium, Lobamba
Referee: Antonio Dungula (Angola)
7 October 2022
15:30

Eswatini	2–1	Botswana
Mosweunyane 14' (o.g.); Mabuza 90'	Report	Mosweunyane 30'

Somhlolo National Stadium, Lobamba
Referee: Osiase Koto (Lesotho)

9 October 2022
12:00

Botswana	1–0	Mauritius
Motsheja 26'	Report

Somhlolo National Stadium, Lobamba
Referee: Artur Alfinar (Mozambique)
9 October 2022
15:30

Eswatini	0–2	Zambia
	Report	Mukosha 38'; Mutale 67'

Somhlolo National Stadium, Lobamba
Referee: Wilhem Haitembu (Namibia)

11 October 2022
15:30

Zambia	1–0	Botswana
Mutandwa 3'	Report

Mavuso Sports Centre, Manzini
Referee: Akhona Makalima (South Africa)
11 October 2022
15:30

Eswatini	7–0	Mauritius
M. Nkambule 4', 6', 40', 55'; Philiso 15', 90+5'; Khumalo 80'	Report

Somhlolo National Stadium, Lobamba
Referee: Attoumani El Fachad (Comoros)

Group B

Pos	Team	Pld	W	D	L	GF	GA	GD	Pts	Qualification
1	Mozambique	3	3	0	0	8	2	+6	9	Semi-finals
2	Angola	3	2	0	1	13	2	+11	6	Semi-finals
3	Lesotho	3	1	0	2	2	7	−5	3	
4	Seychelles	3	0	0	3	2	14	−12	0	

Source: COSAFA.com
8 October 2022
12:00

Angola	5–0	Lesotho
Inácio 27', 42'; Vidal 28'; Makokisa 43'; Lopes 80' (pen.)	Report

Mavuso Sports Centre, Manzini
Referee: Akhona Makalima (South Africa)
8 October 2022
15:30

Mozambique	5–1	Seychelles
Sumbane 14'; Alfandega 46'; Munhave 56'; Ramos 79', 82'	Report	Nourrice 90+3'

Mavuso Sports Centre, Manzini
Referee: Attoumani El Fachad (Comoros)

10 October 2022
12:00

Seychelles	0–1	Lesotho
	Report	Maieane 85'

Somhlolo National Stadium, Lobamba
Referee: Gift Chicco (Malawi)
10 October 2022
15:30

Mozambique	1–0	Angola
Alfandega 66'	Report

Somhlolo National Stadium, Lobamba
Referee: Keabetswe Dintwa (Botswana)

12 October 2022
12:00

Mozambique	2–1	Lesotho
Munhave 35'; Zavala 56'	Report	Tsibela 66'

Somhlolo National Stadium, Lobamba
Referee: Antonio Dungula (Angola)
12 October 2022
12:00

Angola	8–1	Seychelles
Brito 10', 58'; Calhão 24'; Makokisa 28', 34', 51'; Paxe 30'; Borges 77'	Report	Raheriniaina 48' (pen.)

Mavuso Sports Centre, Manzini
Referee: Celumusa Siphepho (Eswatini)

Group C

Pos	Team	Pld	W	D	L	GF	GA	GD	Pts	Qualification
1	South Africa	3	2	0	1	9	4	+5	6 (Note: Ranked on head-to-head goal difference: South Africa +2, Malawi 0, Comoros -2.)	Semi-finals
2	Malawi	3	2	0	1	7	4	+3	6	
3	Comoros	3	2	0	1	3	4	−1	6	
4	Namibia	3	0	0	3	4	11	−7	0	

Source: COSAFA.com
Notes:
8 October 2022
12:00

South Africa	0–2	Malawi
	Report	Mkandawire 26'; Mphasi 67'

Somhlolo National Stadium, Lobamba
Referee: Keabetswe Dintwa (Botswana)
8 October 2022
15:30

Namibia	0–1	Comoros
	Report	Younousse 87'

Somhlolo National Stadium, Lobamba
Referee: Keren Yocette (Seychelles)

10 October 2022
12:00

Comoros	2–0	Malawi
Said 36' (pen.); Betombo 83'	Report

Mavuso Sports Centre, Manzini
Referee: Osiase Koto (Lesotho)
10 October 2022
15:30

Namibia	2–5	South Africa
van Wyk 1'; Doeseb 30'	Report	Duba 17'; Andries 46', 54'; Daniels 88'; Ratomo 90+2'

Mavuso Sports Centre, Manzini
Referee: Celumusa Siphepho (Eswatini)

12 October 2022
15:30

South Africa	4–0	Comoros
Manku 24'; Nkota 42'; Dithejane 68'; Ratomo 87'	Report

Mavuso Sports Centre, Manzini
Referee: Gift Chicco (Malawi)
12 October 2022
15:30

Namibia	2–5	Malawi
Stern 62'; Prins 65'	Report	Salima 11', 40' (pen.); Mphasi 49'; Mapemba 53'; Saviel 83'

Somhlolo National Stadium, Lobamba
Referee: Artur Alfinar (Mozambique)

Ranking of second-placed teams

Pos	Grp	Team	Pld	W	D	L	GF	GA	GD	Pts	Qualification
1	B	Angola	3	2	0	1	13	2	+11	6	Semi-finals
2	A	Eswatini	3	2	0	1	9	3	+6	6	
3	C	Malawi	3	2	0	1	7	4	+3	6	

Source: COSAFA.com
Rules for classification: Group tiebreakers

=== Knockout stage ===
Winners qualified for 2023 Africa U-20 Cup of Nations.

Semi-finals
14 October – Somhlolo Stadium
Mozambique	2
South Africa	1
14 October – Somhlolo Stadium
Zambia (p)	1 (3)
Angola	1 (2)

Final
16 October – Somhlolo Stadium
Mozambique	0
Zambia	1
Third place
16 October – Somhlolo Stadium
South Africa (p)	1 (4)
Angola	1 (2)

Semi-finals

14 October 2022
12:00

Mozambique	2–1	South Africa
Alfandega 11'; Abdala 15'	Report	Duba 25'

Somhlolo National Stadium, Lobamba
Referee: Antonio Dungula (Angola)
14 October 2022
15:30

Zambia	1–1	Angola
Chipyoka 41'	Report	Kali 31'
Penalties
Mphande (penalty scored); Nsiku (penalty scored); Ng'ambi (penalty scored); Tembo (penalty missed)	3–2	(penalty scored) Lopes; (penalty missed) Eusébio; (penalty scored) Ary; (penalty missed) Kaipira; (penalty missed) Kipanda

Somhlolo National Stadium, Lobamba
Referee: Akhona Makalima (South Africa)

Third place

16 October 2022
12:00

South Africa	1–1	Angola
Nkota 11'	Report	Makokisa 15'
Penalties
Mbutho (penalty scored); McCarthy (penalty scored); Ratomo (penalty scored); Shabalala (penalty scored)	4–2	(penalty missed) Lopes; (penalty scored) Makokisa; (penalty scored) Paxe; (penalty missed) Jota

Somhlolo National Stadium, Lobamba
Referee: Artur Alfinar (Mozambique)

Final

16 October 2022
15:30

Mozambique	0–1	Zambia
	Report	Mutandwa 36'

Somhlolo National Stadium, Lobamba
Referee: Osiase Koto (Lesotho)

== Qualified teams ==
The following 12 teams qualify for the final tournament.

Team	Zone	Qualified on	Previous appearances in Africa U-20 Cup of Nations^{1} only final tournament era (since 1991)
Egypt (hosts)	North Zone	16 May 2021	11 (**1991**, 1993, 1997, 2001, **2003**, 2005, 2007, 2009, 2011, **2013**, 2017)
Benin	West B Zone	17 May 2022	2 (2005, 2013)
Nigeria	West B Zone	17 May 2022	11 (1993, 1995, 1999, 2001, **2005**, 2007, 2009, **2011**, 2013, **2015**, 2019)
Gambia	West A Zone	9 September 2022	3 (2007, 2011, 2021)
Senegal	West A Zone	9 September 2022	5 (1993, 1995, 2015, 2017, 2019)
Mozambique	South Zone	14 October 2022	1 (2021)
Zambia	South Zone	14 October 2022	7 (1993, 1995, 1997, 1999, 2007, 2015, **2017**)
Tunisia	North Zone	24 October 2022	1 (2021)
Uganda	Central-East Zone	8 November 2022	1 (2021)
South Sudan	Central-East Zone	8 November 2022	0 (debut)
Central African Republic	Central Zone	14 December 2022	1 (2021)
Congo	Central Zone	14 December 2022	2 (**2007**, 2015)

^{1} Bold indicates champions for that year. Italic indicates hosts for that year.

== Goalscorers ==
There were 212 goals scored in 79 matches, for an average of 2.68 goals per match.

5 goals

- (Angola) Danilson Makokisa

4 goals

- (Eswatini) Mukelo Nkambule
- (Ivory Coast) Seydou Traoré
- (Senegal) Samba Diallo

3 goals

- (Burundi) Arthur Nibikora
- (Guinea) Mohamed Touré
- (Liberia) Divine Teah
- (Mali) Amady Camara
- (Mauritania) Ahmed Ahmed
- (Mozambique) Chaimito Alfandega
- (Nigeria) Ibrahim Muhammad
- (Senegal) Pape Diallo

2 goals

- (Algeria) Abdelali Hamadi
- (Angola) João Brito
- (Angola) Diógenes Inácio
- (Benin) Farid Edou
- (Burkina Faso) Harouna Dicko
- (Burkina Faso) Abdel Rachid Zagré
- (Central African Republic) Boris Gbenou
- (Republic of the Congo) Déo Bassinga
- (Republic of the Congo) Oyeli Nguesso
- (Eswatini) Siphephelo Philiso
- (Ethiopia) Kedir Ali
- (Ethiopia) Yosef Tarekegn
- (The Gambia) Ba Lamin Sowe
- (Guinea) Mohamed Bangoura
- (Liberia) Emmanuel Gono
- (Liberia) Marlon Harrison
- (Malawi) Chifundo Mphasi
- (Malawi) Chikumbutso Salima
- (Mozambique) Dénio Munhave
- (Mozambique) Djwa Ramos
- (Nigeria) Tolulope Ojo
- (Nigeria) Ibrahim Yahaya
- (Senegal) Oumar Diouf
- (Senegal) Libasse Ngom
- (Sierra Leone) Momoh Kamara
- (South Africa) Oshwin Andries
- (South Africa) Brenden Duba
- (South Africa) Mohau Nkota
- (South Africa) Relebohile Ratomo
- (South Sudan) Agumemboki Felix
- (South Sudan) Joseph Loro
- (Tunisia) Mohamed Hedi Jertila
- (Uganda) Titus Ssematimba
- (Zambia) Songa Chipyoka
- (Zambia) Kingstone Mutandwa
- (Zambia) Rickson Ng'ambi

1 goal

- (Algeria) Younes Aitamer
- (Algeria) Adil Boulbina
- (Algeria) Rayan Dehilis
- (Angola) Luís Borges
- (Angola) Calhão
- (Angola) Kali
- (Angola) António Lopes
- (Angola) Alfonso Paxe
- (Angola) Isaac Vidal
- (Benin) Bachirou Assolohan
- (Benin) Djalilou Ibrahim
- (Benin) Malick Tonguï
- (Botswana) Nonofo Mosweunyane
- (Botswana) Botshelo Motsheja
- (Burkina Faso) Nagoro Dao
- (Burkina Faso) Cyriaque Kalou
- (Burkina Faso) Moussa Ky
- (Burundi) Kessy-Jordan Nimbona
- (Burundi) Alfred Nkurunziza
- (Cameroon) Nsongo Tonfack Bil
- (Cameroon) Djawal Kaïba
- (Cape Verde) Luís Maurício
- (Cape Verde) Tutucho
- (Central African Republic) Steven Pougui
- (Comoros) Samuel Betombo
- (Comoros) Yakine Said
- (Comoros) Glenn Younousse
- (Republic of the Congo) Josna Loulendo
- (Republic of the Congo) Jacques Ndecket
- (Republic of the Congo) Aldy Sousou
- (Democratic Republic of the Congo) Muapu Malanaga
- (Eswatini) Sizwe Khumalo
- (Eswatini) Mayibongwe Mabuza
- (Ethiopia) Zelalem Abate
- (Ethiopia) Wegene Gezahegn
- (The Gambia) Adama Bojang
- (The Gambia) Babucarr Faal
- (The Gambia) Alieu Gibba
- (The Gambia) Muhammed Jobe
- (The Gambia) Mansour Mbye
- (Ghana) Alex Sarfo
- (Guinea) Aboubacar Bah
- (Guinea) Alhassane Camara
- (Guinea) Mohamed Camara
- (Guinea) Mohamed Keita
- (Guinea-Bissau) Braima Camará
- (Guinea-Bissau) Janickson da Silva
- (Lesotho) Neo Maieane
- (Lesotho) Tanki Tsibela
- (Libya) Abdelmayser Boushiba
- (Libya) Marwan Al Hbishi
- (Malawi) Chrispine Mapemba
- (Malawi) Vincent Mkandawire
- (Malawi) Emmanuel Saviel
- (Mali) Malick Berthé
- (Mali) Abdou Salam Dembélé
- (Mali) Youba Koïta
- (Mali) Sékou Sanogo
- (Mauritania) Cheikh Amadou Abou
- (Mauritania) Maata Magassa
- (Mauritania) Mohamed M'Bareck
- (Morocco) Wassim Lantaki
- (Morocco) Omar Sadik
- (Mozambique) Keyns Abdala
- (Mozambique) António Sumbane
- (Mozambique) José Zavala
- (Namibia) Lawrence Doeseb
- (Namibia) Rewaldo Prins
- (Namibia) Raymond Stern
- (Namibia) Alberto van Wyk
- (Niger) Massoudi Salifou
- (Nigeria) Ahmad Abdullahi
- (Nigeria) Daniel Daga
- (Senegal) Souleymane Basse
- (Senegal) Pape Diop
- (Senegal) Malick Mbaye
- (Seychelles) Jahni Nourrice
- (Seychelles) Imra Raheriniaina
- (Sierra Leone) Mohamed Fofanah
- (Sierra Leone) Mamadou Lamin
- (South Africa) Luke Daniels
- (South Africa) Puso Dithejane
- (South Africa) Prince Manku
- (Sudan) Musa Ali
- (Sudan) Abdelsamat Omar
- (Sudan) Zeher Toto
- (Tanzania) Athumani Makambo
- (Tanzania) Dickson Mhilu
- (Tunisia) Aziz Abid
- (Tunisia) Mohamed Derbali
- (Tunisia) Youssef Snana
- (Uganda) Issa Bugembe
- (Uganda) Rogers Mugisha
- (Uganda) Isma Mugulusi
- (Uganda) Rogers Torach
- (Zambia) Emmanuel Mukosha
- (Zambia) Lombe Mutale

1 own goal

- (Botswana) Nonofo Mosweunyane (against Eswatini)
- (Ethiopia) Eyasu Legese (against Sudan)

== See also ==
- 2023 Africa U-17 Cup of Nations qualification
