= 2022 COSAFA U-20 Cup =

2022 COSAFA Under-20 Cup
Tournament details
- Host country: Eswatini
- Dates: 7–16 October 2022
- Teams: 12 (from 1 sub-confederation)
- Venue: 2 (in 1 host city)

Final positions
- Champions: Zambia (12th title)
- Runners-up: Mozambique
- Third place: South Africa
- Fourth place: Angola

Tournament statistics
- Matches played: 22
- Goals scored: 73 (3.32 per match)
- Top scorer(s): (Angola) Danilson Makokisa (5 goals)

The 2022 COSAFA U-20 Cup was the 28th edition of the COSAFA U-20 Challenge Cup, an international youth football tournament open to national associations of the COSAFA region. It took place between 7 and 16 October 2022 in Eswatini.

Mozambique was the defending champion having defeated Namibia by 1–0 goal in the final on 13 December 2020 of previous season.

== Participating teams ==
There was no qualification, and all entrants advanced to the final tournament. The following 12 teams from member associations of the COSAFA entered the tournament.

Team	Appearances	Previous best performance
Angola	28th	Runner-up (2000, 2001, 2002, 2011)
Botswana	21st	3rd Place (2009, 2011)
Comoros	4th	Group stage (2013, 2016, 2019, 2020)
Eswatini	28th	Champion (2020)
Lesotho	28th	Runner-up (1990, 2005, 2017)
Malawi	19th	4th Place (1986, 2000, 2006, 2011)
Mauritius		
Mozambique	28th	Champion (2020)
Namibia	28th	Champion (2020)
Seychelles	8th	Group stages (2009, 2010, 2011, 2009, 2013, 2016, 2019)
South Africa	28th	Champion (2000, 2004, 2006, 2008, 2009, 2013, 2017, 2018)
Zambia	28th	Champion (1983, 1986, 1993, 1995, 1997, 1999, 2003, 2010, 2011, 2016, 2019)

== Venues ==
Cities	Venues	Capacity
Lobamba	Somhlolo National Stadium	20,000
Manzini	Mavuso Sports Centre	5,000

== Match officials ==
Referees

- (Angola) António Dungula
- (Lesotho) Osiase Koto
- (South Africa) Akhona Makalima
- (Comoros) Attoumani El Fachad
- (Seychelles) Keren Yocette
- (Botswana) Keabetswe Dintwa

Assistant Referees

- (Angola) Estanislau Guedes
- (Comoros) Mohamed Ibrahim
- (South Africa) Khamusi Razwimisani
- (Madagascar) Danison Ravelomandimby

== Draw ==
The draw was made in ....... on the.......... Last year's top nations were seeded into one group each and the rest of the teams were placed in 2 pots depending on last year's performance. From the first pot, teams were drawn and slotted consecutively into groups A, B, and C. The last team from pot 1 was then placed among the pot 2 teams to make them 5. Now the teams from the second pot were drawn and slotted consecutively into groups A, B, and C resulting that group C ended up with one less team.

Seeded	Pot 1	Pot 2
Zambia; Eswatini; Mauritius; Botswana	Seychelles; Angola; Lesotho; Mozambique	South Africa; Comoros; Namibia; Malawi

Note: Within brackets 2020 year's performance.

== Group stage ==
The group stage will be played in 3 groups as a round-robin, where the group winners and the best runner up will advance to the semi-finals.

=== Group A ===
Pos	Team	Pld	W	D	L	GF	GA	GD	Pts	Qualification
1	Zambia	3	3	0	0	6	0	+6	9	Advance to Semi-finals
2	Eswatini (H)	3	2	0	1	9	3	+6	6	
3	Botswana	3	1	0	2	2	3	−1	3	
4	Mauritius	3	0	0	3	0	11	−11	0	

Source: GSA
(H) Hosts
7 October 2022
12:00

Zambia	3–0	Mauritius
Chipyoka 21' (pen.); Ng’ambi 81', 90+1'	Report

Somhlolo National Stadium, Lobamba
Referee: António Dungula (Angola)
7 October 2022
15:30

Eswatini	2–1	Botswana
Mosweunyane 14' (o.g.); Mabuza 90+1'	Report	Mosweunyane 31'

Somhlolo National Stadium, Lobamba
Referee: Osiase Koto (Lesotho)

9 October 2022
12:00

Botswana	1–0	Mauritius
Motsheja 26'	Report

Somhlolo National Stadium, Lobamba
Referee: Artur Alfinar (Mozambique)
9 October 2022
15:30

Eswatini	0–2	Zambia
	Report	Mukosha 38'; Mutale 67'

Somhlolo National Stadium, Lobamba
Referee: Wilhem Haitembu (Namibia)

11 October 2022
15:30

Zambia	1–0	Botswana
Mutandwa 3'	Report

Mavuso Sports Centre, Manzini
Referee: Akhona Makalima (South Africa)
11 October 2022
15:30

Eswatini	7–0	Mauritius
M. Nkambule 4', 6', 40', 55'; Philiso 15', 90+5'; Khumalo 80'	Report

Somhlolo National Stadium, Lobamba
Referee: Attoumani El Fachad (Comoros)

=== Group B ===
Pos	Team	Pld	W	D	L	GF	GA	GD	Pts	Qualification
1	Mozambique	3	3	0	0	8	2	+6	9	Advance to Semi-finals
2	Angola	3	2	0	1	13	2	+11	6	Advance to Semi-finals
3	Lesotho	3	1	0	2	2	7	−5	3	
4	Seychelles	3	0	0	3	2	14	−12	0	

Source: GSA
8 October 2022
12:00

Angola	5–0	Lesotho
Inácio 27', 42'; Vidal 28'; Makokisa 43'; Lopes 80' (pen.)	Report

Mavuso Sports Centre, Manzini
Referee: Akhona Makalima (South Africa)
8 October 2022
15:30

Mozambique	5–1	Seychelles
Sumbane 14'; Alfandega 46'; Munhave 56'; Ramos 79', 82'	Report	Nourrice 90+3'

Mavuso Sports Centre, Manzini
Referee: Attoumani El Fachad (Comoros)

10 October 2022
12:00

Seychelles	0–1	Lesotho
	Report	Maieane 85'

Somhlolo National Stadium, Lobamba
Referee: Gift Chicco (Malawi)
10 October 2022
15:30

Mozambique	1–0	Angola
Alfandega 66'	Report

Somhlolo National Stadium, Lobamba
Referee: Keabetswe Dintwa (Botswana)

12 October 2022
12:00

Mozambique	2–1	Lesotho
Munhave 35'; Zavala 56'	Report	Tsibela 66'

Somhlolo National Stadium, Lobamba
Referee: Antonio Dungula (Angola)
12 October 2022
12:00

Angola	8–1	Seychelles
Brito 10', 58'; Calhão 24'; Makokisa 28', 34', 51'; Paxe 30'; Borges 77'	Report	Raheriniaina 48' (pen.)

Mavuso Sports Centre, Manzini
Referee: Celumusa Siphepho (Eswatini)

=== Group C ===
Pos	Team	Pld	W	D	L	GF	GA	GD	Pts	Qualification
1	South Africa	3	2	0	1	9	4	+5	6 (Note: Ranked on head-to-head goal difference: South Africa +2, Malawi 0, Comoros -2.)	Advance to Semi-finals
2	Malawi	3	2	0	1	7	4	+3	6	
3	Comoros	3	2	0	1	3	4	−1	6	
4	Namibia	3	0	0	3	4	11	−7	0	

Source: GSA
Notes:
8 October 2022
12:00

South Africa	0–2	Malawi
	Report	Mkandawire 26'; Mphasi 67'

Somhlolo National Stadium, Lobamba
Referee: Keabetswe Dintwa (Botswana)
8 October 2022
15:30

Namibia	0–1	Comoros
	Report	Younousse 87'

Somhlolo National Stadium, Lobamba
Referee: Keren Yocette (Seychelles)

10 October 2022
12:00

Comoros	2–0	Malawi
Said 36' (pen.); Betombo 83'	Report

Mavuso Sports Centre, Manzini
Referee: Osiase Koto (Lesotho)
10 October 2022
15:30

Namibia	2–5	South Africa
van Wyk 1'; Doeseb 30'	Report	Duba 17'; Andries 46', 54'; Daniels 88'; Ratomo 90+2'

Mavuso Sports Centre, Manzini
Referee: Celumusa Siphepho (Eswatini)

12 October 2022
15:30

South Africa	4–0	Comoros
Manku 24'; Nkota 42'; Dithejane 68'; Ratomo 87'	Report

Mavuso Sports Centre, Manzini
Referee: Gift Chicco (Malawi)
12 October 2022
15:30

Namibia	2–5	Malawi
Stern 62'; Prins 65'	Report	Salima 11', 40' (pen.); Mphasi 49'; Mapemba 53'; Saviel 83'

Somhlolo National Stadium, Lobamba
Referee: Artur Alfinar (Mozambique)

=== Ranking of second-placed teams ===
Pos	Grp	Team	Pld	W	D	L	GF	GA	GD	Pts	Qualification
1	B	Angola	3	2	0	1	13	2	+11	6	Semi-finals
2	A	Eswatini	3	2	0	1	9	3	+6	6	
3	C	Malawi	3	2	0	1	7	4	+3	6	

Source: COSAFA.com
Rules for classification: Group tiebreakers

== Knockout stage ==
=== Bracket ===
Semi-finals
14 October – Somhlolo Stadium
Mozambique	2
South Africa	1
14 October – Somhlolo Stadium
Zambia (p)	1 (3)
Angola	1 (2)

Final
16 October – Somhlolo Stadium
Mozambique	0
Zambia	1

=== Semi-finals ===
Winners qualified for 2023 Africa U-20 Cup of Nations.

14 October 2022
12:00

Mozambique	2–1	South Africa
Alfandega 11'; Abdala 15'	Report	Duba 25'

Somhlolo National Stadium, Lobamba
Referee: Antonio Dungula (Angola)
14 October 2022
15:30

Zambia	1–1	Angola
Chipyoka 41'	Report	Kali 31'
Penalties
Mphande (penalty scored); Nsiku (penalty scored); Ng'ambi (penalty scored); Tembo (penalty missed)	3–2	(penalty scored) Lopes; (penalty missed) Eusébio; (penalty scored) Ary; (penalty missed) Kaipira; (penalty missed) Kipanda

Somhlolo National Stadium, Lobamba
Referee: Akhona Makalima (South Africa)

=== Third place play-of ===
16 October 2022
12:00

South Africa	1–1	Angola
Nkota 11'	Report	Makokisa 15'
Penalties
Mbutho (penalty scored); McCarthy (penalty scored); Ratomo (penalty scored); Shabalala (penalty scored)	4–2	(penalty missed) Lopes; (penalty scored) Makokisa; (penalty scored) Paxe; (penalty missed) Jota

Somhlolo National Stadium, Lobamba
Referee: Artur Alfinar (Mozambique)

=== Final ===
16 October 2022
15:30

Mozambique	0–1	Zambia
	Report	Mutandwa 36'

Somhlolo National Stadium, Lobamba
Referee: Osiase Koto (Lesotho)

== Goalscorers ==
There were 73 goals scored in 22 matches, for an average of 3.32 goals per match.

5 goals

- (Angola) Danilson Makokisa

4 goals

- (Eswatini) Mukelo Nkambule

3 goals

- (Mozambique) Chaimito Alfandega

2 goals

- (Angola) João Brito
- (Angola) Diógenes Inácio
- (Eswatini) Siphephelo Philiso
- (Malawi) Chifundo Mphasi
- (Malawi) Chikumbutso Salima
- (Mozambique) Dénio Munhave
- (Mozambique) Djwa Ramos
- (South Africa) Oshwin Andries
- (South Africa) Brenden Duba
- (South Africa) Nikhil Reddy
- (South Africa) Relebohile Ratomo
- (Zambia) Songa Chipyoka
- (Zambia) Kingstone Mutandwa
- (Zambia) Rickson Ng’ambi

1 goal

- (Angola) Domingos Bandeira
- (Angola) Luís Borges
- (Angola) Vicente Domingos
- (Angola) António Lopes
- (Angola) Alfonso Paxe
- (Angola) Isaac Vidal
- (Botswana) Nonofo Mosweunyane
- (Botswana) Botshelo Motsheja
- (Comoros) Samuel Betombo
- (Comoros) Yakine Said
- (Comoros) Glenn Younousse
- (Eswatini) Sizwe Khumalo
- (Eswatini) Mayibongwe Mabuza
- (Lesotho) Neo Maieane
- (Lesotho) Tanki Tsibela
- (Malawi) Chrispine Mapemba
- (Malawi) Vincent Mkandawire
- (Malawi) Emmanuel Saviel
- (Mozambique) Keyns Abdala
- (Mozambique) António Sumbane
- (Mozambique) José Zavala
- (Namibia) Lawrence Doeseb
- (Namibia) Rewaldo Prins
- (Namibia) Raymond Stern
- (Namibia) Alberto van Wyk
- (Seychelles) Jahni Nourrice
- (Seychelles) Imra Raheriniaina
- (South Africa) Luke Daniels
- (South Africa) Puso Dithejane
- (South Africa) Prince Manku
- (Zambia) Emmanuel Mukosha
- (Zambia) Lombe Mutale

1 own goal

- (Botswana) Nonofo Mosweunyane (against Eswatini)
