= COSAFA U-20 Youth Championship =

Football tournament in Southern Africa

COSAFA Under-20 Cup
- Logo of U-20 COSAFA Championship
- Founded: 1983; 43 years ago
- Region: Southern Africa
- Teams: 12
- Current champions: South Africa (11th title)
- Most championships: Zambia (12 titles)
- Broadcaster(s): COSAFA TV (YouTube) CAF TV (YouTube) FIFA+
- Website: cosafa.com
- 2026 COSAFA U-20 Championship

The COSAFA Under-20 Challenge is an annual tournament for under-20 teams from Southern Africa organized by COSAFA.

== Participants ==
Teams that can technically enter are:

- Angola
- Botswana
- Comoros
- Eswatini
- Lesotho
- Madagascar
- Malawi
- Mauritius
- Mayotte
- Mozambique
- Namibia
- Réunion
- Seychelles
- South Africa
- Zambia
- Zimbabwe.

== Results ==
Ed.	Year	Host	Final			Third place match			N° teams
Ed.	Year	Host	(gold) Champions	Score	(silver) Runners-up	(bronze) Third place	Score	Fourth place	N° teams
1	1983	Unknown	Zambia	Unk.	Unknown	Unknown			?
2	1985	Swaziland	Zimbabwe	Unk.	Unknown	Swaziland	Unk.	Unknown	?
3	1986	Malawi	Zambia	1–0	Zimbabwe	Swaziland	1–0	Malawi	5
4	1988	Botswana	Zimbabwe	2–1	Zambia	Unknown			6
5	1990	Lesotho	Zimbabwe	RR	Lesotho	Swaziland	RR	Namibia	5
6	1993	Swaziland	Zambia	1–0	Zimbabwe	Unknown			?
7	1995	Lesotho	Zambia	1–0	South Africa	Lesotho	3–1	Swaziland	?
8	1997	Botswana	Zambia	2–0	Zimbabwe	Unknown			?
9	1999	South Africa	Zambia	2–0	South Africa	Zimbabwe	3–1	Lesotho	10
10	2000	South Africa	South Africa	1–0	Angola	Zimbabwe	3–2	Malawi	12
11	2001	South Africa	Zimbabwe	0–0 (5–3 p)	Angola	Zambia	1–1 (5–3 p)	South Africa	12
12	2002	South Africa	Zimbabwe	1–0	Angola	South Africa	2–0	Zambia	11
13	2003	South Africa	Zambia	4–0	Malawi	South Africa	1–1 (4–1 p)	Lesotho	12
14	2004	South Africa	South Africa	5–4	Zambia	Zimbabwe	2–1	Angola	13
15	2005	South Africa	Madagascar	1–0	Lesotho	Zambia	2–0	South Africa	13
16	2006	South Africa	South Africa	2–1	Zambia	Zimbabwe	0–0 (3–2 p)	Malawi	12
17	2007	South Africa	Zimbabwe	3–0	South Africa	Madagascar	2–1	Namibia	14
18	2008	South Africa	South Africa	3–2	Mozambique	Angola	2–0	Zimbabwe	14
19	2009	South Africa	Zambia	1–0	South Africa	Botswana	0–0 (3–2 p)	Madagascar	11
20	2010	Botswana	Zambia	4–1	Namibia	Zimbabwe	3–1	Madagascar	12
21	2011	Botswana	Zambia	2–1	Angola	Botswana	1–0	Malawi	14
22	2013	Lesotho	South Africa	2–0	Kenya	Angola	2–0	Zimbabwe	14
23	2016	South Africa	Zambia	2–1	South Africa	DR Congo	1–1 (4–3 p)	Angola	14
24	2017	Zambia	South Africa	2–1	Lesotho	Egypt	3–1	Uganda	12
25	2018	Zambia	South Africa	1–1 (4–3 p)	Zimbabwe	Angola	2–1	Zambia	11
26	2019	Zambia	Zambia	3–0	South Africa	Angola	5–1	Madagascar	12
27	2020	South Africa	Mozambique	1–0	Namibia	Angola	2–1	Zambia	11
28	2022	Eswatini	Zambia	1–0	Mozambique	South Africa	1–1 (4–2 p)	Angola	12
29	2024	Mozambique	South Africa	2–0	Zambia	Angola and Zimbabwe			11
30	2025	Namibia	South Africa	3–0	Malawi	Zambia	1–1 (5–4 p)	Angola	8
31	2026	Mozambique	South Africa	2–1	Mozambique	Zambia	3–0	Namibia	12

== Medals (1983-2026) ==
Rank	Nation	Gold	Silver	Bronze	Total
1	Zambia	12	4	5	21
2	South Africa	11	6	3	20
3	Zimbabwe	6	4	6	16
4	Mozambique	1	4	0	5
5	Madagascar	1	0	1	2
6	Angola	0	4	6	10
7	Lesotho	0	3	1	4
8	Malawi	0	2	0	2
8	Namibia	0	2	0	2
10	Kenya	0	1	0	1
11	Eswatini	0	0	3	3
12	Botswana	0	0	2	2
13	DR Congo	0	0	1	1
13	Egypt	0	0	1	1
Totals (14 entries)		31	30	29	90

- 1983,1985 Silver Unknown + 1983,1988,1993,1997 Bronze Unknown + 2024 Bronze Shared

== Comprehensive team results by tournament ==
Legend

- 1st — Champions
- 2nd — Runners-up
- 3rd — Third place
- 4th — Fourth place
- QF — Quarter-finals
- •• — Withdrew
- × — Did not enter / Banned
- XX — Country did not exist or national team was inactive
- P — Has participated in past editions with no available results / Confirmed for the upcoming tournament.

For each tournament, the number of teams in each finals tournament are shown (in parentheses).

Team	1983 (N/A) (?)	1985 (Eswatini) (?)	1986 (Malawi) (5)	1988 (Botswana) (6)	1990 (Lesotho) (5)	1993 (Eswatini) (?)	1995 (Lesotho) (?)	1997 (Botswana) (?)	1999 (South Africa) (10)	2000 (South Africa) (12)	2001 (South Africa) (12)	2002 (South Africa) (11)	2003 (South Africa) (12)	2004 (South Africa) (13)	2005 (South Africa) (13)	2006 (South Africa) (12)	2007 (South Africa) (14)	2008 (South Africa) (14)	2009 (South Africa) (11)	2010 (Botswana) (12)	2011 (Botswana) (14)	2013 (Lesotho) (14)	2016 (South Africa) (14)	2017 (Zambia) (12)	2018 (Zambia) (11)	2019 (Zambia) (12)	2020 (South Africa) (11)	2022 (Eswatini) (12)	2024 (Mozambique) (11)	2025 (Namibia) (8)	2026 (Mozambique) (12)	Total
Angola	×	×	×	×	×	?	?	?	×	2nd	2nd	2nd	GS	4th	GS	GS	GS	3rd	GS	GS	2nd	3rd	4th	GS	3rd	3rd	3rd	4th	SF	4th	GS	22
Botswana	P	?	×	P	5th	P	P	P	GS	GS	GS	GS	GS	GS	GS	GS	GS	GS	3rd	GS	3rd	GS	GS	×	GS	GS	GS	GS	GS	GS	GS	28
Comoros	Not a member																GS	GS	••	••	×	GS	GS	×	×	GS	GS	GS	GS	×	GS	9
Eswatini	×	3rd	3rd	3rd	3rd	P	4th	?	GS	GS	GS	QF	GS	GS	GS	GS	GS	GS	GS	GS	GS	GS	GS	GS	GS	GS	GS	GS	GS	GS	GS	29
Lesotho	×	?	×	P	2nd	?	3rd	P	4th	QF	GS	GS	4th	GS	2nd	GS	GS	GS	GS	GS	GS	GS	GS	2nd	GS	GS	GS	GS	GS	×	GS	26
Madagascar	Not a member								GS	×	QF	••	GS	GS	1st	GS	3rd	?	4th	4th	GS	GS	×	×	×	4th	×	×	••	×	×	12
Malawi	P	?	4th	×	••	P	?	P	GS	4th	QF	QF	2nd	GS	GS	4th	GS	GS	×	••	4th	×	GS	GS	GS	GS	GS	GS	GS	2nd	GS	24
Mauritius	Not a member									GS	GS	GS	GS	GS	GS	GS	GS	GS	••	GS	GS	GS	GS	GS	GS	GS	×	GS	×	×	GS	18
Mozambique	×	?	GS	P	••	?	P	P	GS	QF	QF	QF	GS	GS	GS	GS	GS	2nd	GS	GS	GS	GS	GS	GS	GS	GS	1st	2nd	GS	×	2nd	26
Namibia	×	?	×	×	4th	P	?	?	GS	QF	QF	QF	GS	GS	GS	GS	4th	GS	GS	2nd	GS	GS	••	GS	••	×	2nd	GS	GS	GS	4th	22
Seychelles	Not a member									GS	×	×	×	GS	GS	×	GS	GS	GS	GS	GS	GS	GS	×	×	GS	×	GS	×	×	GS	13
South Africa	Banned					P	2nd	?	2nd	1st	4th	3rd	3rd	1st	4th	1st	2nd	1st	1st	GS	GS	1st	2nd	1st	1st	2nd	GS	3rd	1st	1st	1st	25
Zambia	1st	?	1st	2nd	••	1st	1st	1st	1st	QF	3rd	4th	1st	2nd	3rd	2nd	GS	GS	2nd	1st	1st	GS	1st	GS	4th	1st	4th	1st	2nd	3rd	3rd	29
Zimbabwe	P	1st	2nd	1st	1st	2nd	?	2nd	3rd	3rd	1st	1st	GS	3rd	GS	3rd	1st	4th	GS	3rd	GS	4th	GS	GS	2nd	×	GS	×	SF	GS	×	27
