= 2011 COSAFA U-20 Cup =

2011 COSAFA Under-20 Youth Championships
Tournament details
- Host country: Botswana
- Dates: December 1–10
- Teams: 11 (from 1 confederation)

The 2011 COSAFA U-20 Cup (or 2011 Metropolitan COSAFA Under-20 Youth Championships for sponsorship reasons) is the 20th edition of the football tournament that involves the youth teams from Southern Africa. Botswana will host the competition for the second consecutive time.

== Group stage ==
=== Group A ===
Team	Pld	W	D	L	GF	GA	GD	Pts
Botswana	2	1	1	0	3	0	+3	4
Mozambique	2	1	1	0	3	1	+2	4
Swaziland	2	0	0	2	1	6	−5	0

1 December
16:00

Mozambique	0–0	Botswana

Molepolole Stadium
4 December
17:30

Swaziland	1–3	Mozambique

University of Botswana Stadium
6 December
16:30

Swaziland	0–3	Botswana

Molepolole Stadium

=== Group B ===
Team	Pld	W	D	L	GF	GA	GD	Pts
Malawi	2	2	0	0	5	2	+3	6
Lesotho	2	1	0	1	5	4	+1	3
Seychelles	2	0	0	2	1	5	−4	0

1 December
18:30

Seychelles	0–2	Malawi

University of Botswana Stadium
4 December
15:00

Malawi	3–2	Lesotho

University of Botswana Stadium
5 December
17:30

Lesotho	3–1	Seychelles

University of Botswana Stadium

=== Group C ===
Team	Pld	W	D	L	GF	GA	GD	Pts
Zambia	3	2	1	0	12	4	+8	7
Tanzania	3	1	2	0	7	4	+3	5
South Africa	3	1	1	1	6	6	0	4
Mauritius	3	0	0	3	0	11	−11	0

2 December
15:00

South Africa	4–0	Mauritius

University of Botswana Stadium
2 December
17:30

Zambia	3–3	Tanzania

University of Botswana Stadium
4 December
17:30

Tanzania	1–1	South Africa

Molepolole Stadium
4 December
20:00

Mauritius	0–4	Zambia

Molepolole Stadium
6 December
14:00

Tanzania	3–0	Mauritius

University of Botswana Stadium
6 December
14:00

South Africa	1–5	Zambia

Molepolole Stadium

=== Group D ===
Team	Pld	W	D	L	GF	GA	GD	Pts
Angola	3	3	0	0	8	5	+3	9
Namibia	3	1	1	1	7	6	+1	4
Zimbabwe	3	0	2	1	8	9	−1	2
Madagascar	3	0	1	2	6	9	−3	0

2 December
15:00

Angola	1–0	Madagascar

Molepolole Stadium
2 December
17:30

Namibia	1–1	Zimbabwe

Molepolole Stadium
5 December
15:00

Zimbabwe	2–3	Angola

Molepolole Stadium
5 December
20:00

Madagascar	1–3	Namibia

Molepolole Stadium
6 December
19:00

Madagascar	5–5	Zimbabwe

University of Botswana Stadium
6 December
19:00

Namibia	3–4	Angola

Molepolole Stadium

== Knock-out stage ==
=== Semi-finals ===
8 December
14:00

Malawi	2–4	Angola

Molepolole Stadium
8 December
16:30

Botswana	0–2	Zambia

Molepolole Stadium

=== Third-place playoff ===
10 December
11:00

Malawi	0–1	Botswana

University of Botswana Stadium

=== Final ===
10 December
15:00

Angola	1–2	Zambia

University of Botswana Stadium
