= 2009 COSAFA U-20 Cup =

Tournament details
- Host country: South Africa
- City: Dobsonville
- Dates: 6-15 December 2009
- Teams: 13 (from 1 confederation)

Final positions
- Champions: Zambia (8th title)
- Runners-up: South Africa
- Third place: Botswana
- Fourth place: Madagascar

Tournament statistics
- Matches played: 19

The 2009 COSAFA U-20 Cup is an association football tournament contested between national teams affiliated to COSAFA.

== Participants ==
Group A

- Comoros (Note: Withdrew)
- Namibia
- Seychelles
- South Africa

Group B

- Madagascar
- Mozambique
- Swaziland

Group C

- Botswana
- Lesotho
- Zimbabwe

Group D

- Angola
- Mauritius (Note: Withdrew)
- Zambia

== Groups ==
=== Group A ===
6 December 2009
16:30

| South Africa | 9-0 | Namibia |

Dobsonville
9 December 2009
14:30

| South Africa | 2-1 | Seychelles |

Eldorado Park
11 December 2009
15:00

| Namibia | 2-4 | Seychelles |

Dobsonville

=== Group B ===
7 December 2009
16:30

| Mozambique | 1-1 | Madagascar |

Meadowlands
9 December 2009
16:30

| Mozambique | 2-0 | Swaziland |

Dobsonville
11 December 2009
15:00

| Madagascar | 2-1 | Swaziland |

Dobsonville

=== Group C ===
7 December 2009
14:30

| Zimbabwe | 2-2 | Botswana |

Dobsonville
9 December 2009
14:30

| Zimbabwe | 3-1 | Lesotho |

Meadowlands
11 December 2009
15:00

| Botswana | 4-2 | Lesotho |

Eldorado Park

=== Group D ===
7 December 2009
17:00

| Angola | 1-2 | Zambia |

Eldorado Park

== Knock-out Stage ==
Quarter-finals

Semi-final
13 December
Madagascar | 0
Zambia | 4
13 December
Botswana | 0
South Africa | 3

Final
15 December
South Africa | 2
Zambia | 1
Third place
15 December
Botswana | 0(3)
Madagascar | 0(2)

=== Semi finals ===
13 December 2009
14:30

| Madagascar | 0-4 | Zambia |

Eldorado Park
13 December 2009
17:00

| Botswana | 0-3 | South Africa |

Eldorado Park

=== Third Place Playoff ===
15 December 2009
14:30

| Botswana | 0-0 | Madagascar |
Penalties
| | 3-2 |

Dobsonville

=== Final ===
15 December 2009
16:30

| Zambia | 1-0 | South Africa |

Dobsonville
