= 2001 African Youth Championship =

Tournament details
- Host country: Ethiopia
- Dates: 18 March – 1 April
- Teams: 8

Final positions
- Champions: Angola (1st title)
- Runners-up: Ghana
- Third place: Egypt
- Fourth place: Ethiopia

Tournament statistics
- Best player: (Angola) António Mendonça

The African Youth Championship 2001 was held in Ethiopia. It also served as qualification for the 2001 FIFA World Youth Championship.

== Qualification ==
=== Preliminary round ===
Eritrea and Guinea Bissau withdrew. As a result, Kenya and Gambia advanced to the next round.

Team 1	Agg.	Team 2	1st leg	2nd leg
Gabon	2–2(a)	Equatorial Guinea	2–1	0–1
Botswana	1–3	Swaziland	1–2	0–1
Tanzania	4–0	Namibia	2–0	2–0
Mauritius	6–3	Lesotho	4–1	2–2
Réunion	1–2	Madagascar	1–0	0–2
Somalia	1–2	Uganda	not played	1–2

=== First round ===
Congo-Brazzaville and Sierra Leone withdrew. As a result, Cameroon and Ghana advanced to the next round.

Team 1	Agg.	Team 2	1st leg	2nd leg
Algeria	2–1	Libya	1–0	1–1
Equatorial Guinea	0–7	Mali	0–1	0–6
Ivory Coast	2–2 (p: 2–4)	Tunisia	1–1	1–1
Gambia	(a)2–2	Senegal	0–1	2–1
Swaziland	3–7	Angola	2–1	1–6
Morocco	1–2	Burkina Faso	1–0	0–2
Sudan	3–6	Nigeria	1–2	2–4
Tanzania	2–4	Mozambique	0–0	2–4
Mauritius	1–5	South Africa	0–3	1–2
Madagascar	3–5	Malawi	1–2	2–3
Uganda	2–3	Zambia	2–3	0–0
Kenya	0–1	Egypt	0–0	0–1

=== Second round ===
Team 1	Agg.	Team 2	1st leg	2nd leg
Ghana	3–2	Algeria	1–0	2–2
Mali	3–2	Tunisia	2–0	1–2
Cameroon	2–1	Gambia	1–0	1–1
Angola	2–0	Burkina Faso	2–0	0–0
Nigeria	5–1	Mozambique	3–1	2–0
South Africa	7–5	Malawi	3–3	4–2
Zambia	0–0 (p: 1–3)	Egypt	0–0	0–0

== Teams ==
The following teams qualified for tournament:

- Angola
- Cameroon
- Egypt
- Ethiopia (host)
- Ghana
- Mali
- Nigeria
- South Africa

== Group stage ==
=== Group A ===
Pos	Team	Pld	W	D	L	GF	GA	GD	Pts	Qualification
1	Ethiopia (H)	3	1	1	1	6	4	+2	4	Advance to knockout stage
2	Egypt	2	1	1	0	3	2	+1	4	Advance to knockout stage
3	Cameroon	2	1	1	0	3	2	+1	4	
4	South Africa	3	0	1	2	3	7	−4	1	

Rules for classification: Group tiebreakers
(H) Hosts

18 March	Ethiopia	0–1	Cameroon
	South Africa	0–1	Egypt
21 March	Cameroon	2–2	South Africa
	Egypt	2–2	Ethiopia
24 March	Cameroon	0-0 ^{1}	Egypt
26 March ^{2}	Ethiopia	4–1	South Africa

^{1} The match was abandoned in the 89th minute and the score at 0–0 after fans invaded the pitch believing that the teams had arranged a draw so both could progress. The match was ordered to be replayed two days later, with the results to be used to determine who would qualify for the semifinals but not to count in the standings.
^{2} The match was originally scheduled for the 24th, but was postponed after the South African team had travel difficulties.

==== Semifinals play-off ====
26 March	Cameroon	1–3	Egypt

=== Group B ===
Pos	Team	Pld	W	D	L	GF	GA	GD	Pts	Qualification
1	Ghana	3	2	1	0	6	2	+4	7	Advance to knockout stage
2	Angola	3	1	1	1	4	3	+1	4	Advance to knockout stage
3	Mali	3	0	3	0	3	3	0	3	
4	Nigeria	3	0	1	2	1	6	−5	1	

Rules for classification: Group tiebreakers

19 March	Ghana	1–0	Angola
	Mali	0–0	Nigeria
22 March	Angola	2–2	Mali
	Nigeria	1–4	Ghana
25 March	Angola	2–0	Nigeria
	Ghana	1–1	Mali

== Knockout stage ==
=== Semi-finals ===
28 March 2001

Ethiopia	2 – 5	Angola
19', 69' Yordanos		5' Gilberto; 13' Loló; 35', 48' Mantorras; 89' Mendonça

28 March 2001

Ghana	1 – 1	Egypt
96' Stephen Tetteh		98' Gamal Hamza
Penalties
	6 – 5

=== Third place play-off ===
1 April 2001

Ethiopia	0 – 2	Egypt
		3' Ahmed Hossam; 87' Mohammed Abdel Wahed

Attendance: 30.000

=== Final ===
1 April 2001

Ghana	0 – 2	Angola
		57', 85' Loló

Attendance: 30.000

2001 African Youth Championship

Angola
First title

== Qualification to World Youth Championship ==
The four best performing teams qualified for the 2001 FIFA World Youth Championship.

- Angola
- Egypt
- Ethiopia
- Ghana
