= 2007 African Youth Championship =

Coupe d'Afrique des nations junior 2007

Tournament details
- Host country: Republic of the Congo
- Dates: 20 January – 3 February
- Teams: 8

Final positions
- Champions: Congo (1st title)
- Runners-up: Nigeria
- Third place: Gambia
- Fourth place: Zambia

The African Youth Championship 2007 was held in the Republic of the Congo. It also served as qualification for the 2007 FIFA U-20 World Cup.

== Qualification ==
=== Preliminary round ===
Cape Verde, Swaziland and Uganda withdrew. As a result, Senegal, Mozambique and Zimbabwe advanced to the next round.

Team 1	Agg.	Team 2	1st leg	2nd leg
Madagascar	(a)3–3	Mauritius	1–1	2–2
Malawi	3–0	Botswana	2–0	1–0
Rwanda	2–1	Ethiopia	2–1	0–0
Sudan	1–6	Tunisia	1–3	0–3
Niger	(a)3–3	Togo	2–0	1–3
Equatorial Guinea	2–1	Gabon	0–0	2–1
Sierra Leone	1–5	Gambia	1–1	0–4
Mauritania	1–4	Guinea	0–0	1–4
DR Congo	4–1	Namibia	3–0	1–1
Libya	1–3	Algeria	0–2	1–1
Kenya	1–0	Djibouti	1–0	one leg

=== First round ===
Benin and DR Congo withdrew. As a result, Tunisia and Burkina Faso advanced to the next round.

Team 1	Agg.	Team 2	1st leg	2nd leg
Zambia	5–2	Madagascar	4–1	1–1
South Africa	4–3	Zimbabwe	1–0	3–3
Angola	2–3	Ivory Coast	0–0	2–3
Burundi	2–1	Mozambique	1–0	1–1
Ghana	4–1	Senegal	2–0	2–1
Morocco	2–4	Gambia	2–2	0–2
Nigeria	3–2	Equatorial Guinea	3–0	0–2
Lesotho	2–3	Malawi	2–1	0–2
Egypt	4–2	Algeria	4–0	0–2
Cameroon	(a)2–2	Niger	1–0	1–2
Rwanda	2–0	Kenya	1–0	1–0
Mali	2–0	Guinea	1–0	1–0

=== Second round ===
Team 1	Agg.	Team 2	1st leg	2nd leg
Nigeria	6–0	Rwanda	5–0	1–0
South Africa	2–3	Zambia	2–1	0–2
Tunisia	1–3	Ivory Coast	1–1	0–2
Mali	2–3	Gambia	1–1	1–2
Burkina Faso	1–1 (p: 4–3)	Ghana	1–0	0–1
Cameroon	4–0	Malawi	2–0	2–0
Burundi	0–3	Egypt	0–1	0–2

== Teams ==
The following teams qualified for the tournament:

- Burkina Faso
- Cameroon
- Congo (host)
- Ivory Coast
- Egypt
- Gambia
- Nigeria
- Zambia

== Group stage ==
=== Group A ===
Pos	Team	Pld	W	D	L	GF	GA	GD	Pts	Qualification
1	Gambia	3	3	0	0	4	0	+4	9	Advance to knockout stage
2	Congo (H)	3	2	0	1	3	1	+2	6	Advance to knockout stage
3	Burkina Faso	3	1	0	2	2	3	−1	3	
4	Ivory Coast	3	0	0	3	0	5	−5	0	

Rules for classification: Group tiebreakers
(H) Hosts

January 20, 2007

Congo	2 - 0	Ivory Coast

Burkina Faso	0 - 2	Gambia

January 23, 2007

Ivory Coast	0 - 2	Burkina Faso

Gambia	1 - 0	Congo

January 26, 2007

Ivory Coast	0 - 1	Gambia

Congo	1 - 0	Burkina Faso

=== Group B ===
Pos	Team	Pld	W	D	L	GF	GA	GD	Pts	Qualification
1	Zambia	3	2	0	1	8	6	+2	6	Advance to knockout stage
2	Nigeria	3	1	1	1	5	5	0	4	Advance to knockout stage
3	Egypt	3	1	1	1	2	4	−2	4	
4	Cameroon	3	1	0	2	4	4	0	3	

Rules for classification: Group tiebreakers

January 21, 2007

Nigeria	4 - 2	Zambia

Cameroon	0 - 1	Egypt

January 24, 2007

Zambia	3 - 2	Cameroon

Egypt	1 - 1	Nigeria

January 27, 2007

Zambia	3 - 0	Egypt

Nigeria	0 - 2	Cameroon

== Knockout stages ==
=== Semifinals ===
January 30, 2007

Gambia	0 - 1	Nigeria

Zambia	0 - 1	Congo

=== Third place play-off ===
February 2, 2007

Gambia	3 - 1	Zambia

=== Finals ===
February 3, 2007

Nigeria	0 - 1	Congo

== Winner ==
2007 African Youth Championship winners

Congo
First title

== Top scorers ==
1.	(Zambia) Fwayo Tembo	5
2.	(Zambia) Clifford Mulenga	3
2.	(The Gambia) Ousman Jallow	3

== Qualifiers for the 2007 FIFA U-20 World Cup ==
- Gambia
- Congo
- Zambia
- Nigeria
