= South Africa national under-20 soccer team =

National under-20 association soccer team representing South Africa

South Africa under-20
- Nickname: Amajita
- Association: South African; Football Association
- Confederation: CAF (Africa)
- Sub-confederation: COSAFA
- Head coach: Raymond Mdaka
- Captain: Lefa Autata
- FIFA code: RSA
First colours	Second colours

First international
- South Africa 2–0 Swaziland (Somhlolo, Swaziland; 11 December 1993)

Biggest win
- South Africa 8–0 Lesotho (Moruleng, South Africa; 7 December 2016)

Biggest defeat
- Hungary 4–0 South Africa (Alexandria Stadium, Egypt; 30 September 2019)

FIFA U-20 World Cup
- Appearances: 5 (first in 1997)
- Best result: Round of 16 (2009) and (2025)

U-20 Africa Cup of Nations
- Appearances: 9 (first in 1997)
- Best result: (gold) Champions (2025)

COSAFA U-20 Challenge Cup
- Appearances: 23 (first in 1993)
- Best result: (gold) Champions (2000), (2004), (2006), (2008), (2009), (2013), (2017), (2018), (2024), (2025), (2026)

The South Africa national under-20 football team (Amajita), is a youth football (soccer) team, which represents South Africa and is controlled by the South African Football Association, the governing body for football in South Africa. The team's main objectives are to qualify and play at the U-20 Africa Cup of Nations (AFCON) and FIFA U-20 World Cup. The team has played at nine U-20 Africa Cup of Nations tournaments and five FIFA U-20 World Cups.

They are the current U-20 Africa Cup of Nations champions after defeating Morocco in the final held in Cairo on 18 May 2025.

== History ==
The team was founded in 1993 and played their first match against Swaziland winning 2–0.

=== FIFA U-20 World Cup ===
They have qualified for the 1997, 2009, 2017, 2019, and 2025 FIFA U-20 World Cup.

=== Afcon U-20 ===
Amajita were runners-up on debut in 1997 losing 1–0 to hosts Morocco in the final and securing qualification to the 1997 FIFA World Youth Championship. They won their maiden U-20 African Cup of Nations title after beating Morocco 1–0 in the final held in Cairo on 18 May 2025.

=== COSAFA U-20 Cup ===
South Africa have enjoyed sustained success in the COSAFA U‑20 Cup. In 2013, they claimed the title with a 2–0 victory over Kenya in the final held in Lesotho. They secured another championship in 2017, defeating hosts Lesotho 2–1 in the final in Zambia. The team retained the trophy in 2018, overcoming Zimbabwe 4–3 on penalties after a 1–1 draw, again in Zambia.

In 2024, South Africa won their ninth COSAFA U‑20 Cup, beating Zambia 2–0 in the final. They completed the tournament without conceding a goal and qualified for the 2025 U‑20 Africa Cup of Nations. Their tenth title followed in 2025, with a 3–0 win over Malawi in the final in Namibia. In 2026, they captured their eleventh championship by defeating hosts Mozambique 2–1 in the final and after securing qualification for the 2027 U-20 Africa Cup of Nations.

== Player eligibility ==
Players who are selected, will be 20 or younger in the following World Cup year. With the next FIFA U-20 World Cup being held in Azerbaijan and Uzbekistan in 2027, players need to have been born on or after 1 January 2007.

== Results and fixtures ==
The following is a list of match results in the last twelve months, as well as any future matches that have been scheduled.

Legend

Win Draw Loss Fixture

=== 2026 ===
19 September COSAFA U-20	Lesotho	0–3	South Africa	Maputo , Mozambique
15:00			Mendes 45+1', 60'; Mlangeni 65'	Stadium: ABB Stadium

21 September COSAFA U-20	South Africa	2–0	Angola	Maputo , Mozambique
15:00	Maku 14'; Mendes 41'			Stadium: ABB Stadium

23 September COSAFA U-20	South Africa	2–0	Eswatini	Maputo , Mozambique
12:00	Mazibuko 25'; Nalumango 34'			Stadium: ABB Stadium

25 September COSAFA U-20	South Africa	4–2	Zambia	Maputo , Mozambique
12:00	Mendes 63' (pen.), 85' (pen.); Booysen 65'; Witbooi 90+6'		Musialela 29'; Kalamina 75'	Stadium: ABB Stadium

27 September COSAFA U-20	South Africa	2–1	Mozambique	Maputo , Mozambique
14:00	Booysen 28'; Mendes 58' (pen.)		Começar 30'	Stadium: ABB Stadium

== Current squad ==
The following players were called up for the 2026 COSAFA U-20 Youth Championship between 18 – 27 September 2026.

No.	Pos.	Player	Date of birth (age)	Club
1	GK	Takalani Mazhamba	30 May 2007 (aged 18)	(South African Football Association) Kaizer Chiefs
22	GK	Anothando Menemene	20 June 2006 (aged 19)	(South African Football Association) Mamelodi Sundowns
	GK	Keabetswe Morake		(South African Football Association) Kaizer Chiefs
21	DF	Ukhonaye Magele	12 February 2007 (aged 18)	(South African Football Association) University of Johannesburg
	DF	Egan Freese		(South African Football Association) Kaizer Chiefs
	DF	Sanele Simelane		(South African Football Association) Richards Bay
	DF	Lakham Gqonqo		(South African Football Association) TS Galaxy
	DF	Cayden Fortune		(South African Football Association) Cape Town City
	DF	Milimo Nalumango		(South African Football Association) Orlando Pirates
	DF	Mathhew Palmer		(Croatian Football Federation) NK Slaven Belupo
	DF	Zazi Qotoyi		(South African Football Association) Mamelodi Sundowns
15	MF	Lazola Maku	10 April 2007 (aged 18)	unattached
	MF	Teboho Mlangeni		(South African Football Association) Kaizer Chiefs
	MF	Manelis Mazibuko		(South African Football Association) Siwelele
14	MF	Oarabile Booysen		(South African Football Association) University of Pretoria
	MF	Emile Witbooi		(South African Football Association) Cape Town City
	MF	Kgomotso Madiba		(Brazilian Football Confederation) Fluminense
	MF	Joshua Taylor		(South African Football Association) Cape Town City
	MF	Kamogelo Mareletse		(South African Football Association) Mamelodi Sundowns
	FW	Will Henson		(South African Football Association) Orlando Pirates
	FW	Steven Mendez		(South African Football Association) Kaizer Chiefs
	FW	Angus Moss		(South African Football Association) Mamelodi Sundowns

=== Notable former players ===
Players who have previously played for the under-20 team, and have since gone on to play for the senior team:

- Benni McCarthy
- Matthew Booth
- Thulani Serero
- Stanton Fredericks
- Thulani Hlatshwayo
- Darren Keet
- Andile Jali
- Junaid Hartley
- Siyabonga Nomvethe

== Tournament records ==
=== FIFA U-20 World Cup record ===
U-20 World Cup
Hosts/Year	Result	Position	GP	W	D*	L	GS	GA
1977–1993	Banned							
(Qatar) 1995	did not qualify							
(Malaysia) 1997	Group Stage	20th	3	0	1	2	2	6
1999 to 2007	did not qualify							
(Egypt) 2009	Round of 16	15th	4	1	1	2	5	8
(Colombia) 2011	did not qualify							
(Turkey) 2013	did not qualify							
(New Zealand) 2015	did not qualify							
(South Korea) 2017	Group Stage	21st	3	0	1	2	1	4
(Poland) 2019	Group Stage	19th	3	0	1	2	3	7
(Argentina) 2023	did not qualify							
(Chile) 2025	Round of 16	13th	4	2	0	2	9	6
(Azerbaijan) (Uzbekistan) 2027	To be determined							
(Armenia) (Georgia (country)) 2029	To be determined							
	Round of 16	5/26	17	3	4	10	20	31

=== U-20 Africa Cup of Nations record ===
U-20 Africa Cup of Nations
Hosts/Year	Result	GP	W	D*	L	GS	GA
1979 to 1993	did not enter						
(Nigeria) 1995	did not qualify						
(Morocco) 1997	Second Place	5	2	1	2	5	5
(Ghana) 1999	did not qualify						
(Ethiopia) 2001	Group Stage	3	0	1	2	3	7
(Burkina Faso) 2003	Group Stage	3	0	1	2	3	7
(Benin) 2005	did not qualify						
(Republic of the Congo) 2007	did not qualify						
(Rwanda) 2009	Fourth Place	5	2	0	3	8	9
(South Africa) 2011	Group Stage	3	1	0	2	4	6
(Algeria) 2013	did not qualify						
(Senegal) 2015	Group Stage	3	1	0	2	6	6
(Zambia) 2017	Fourth Place	5	2	0	4	10	9
(Niger) 2019	Third Place	5	1	3	0	2	2
(Mauritania) 2021	did not qualify						
(Egypt) 2023	did not qualify						
(Egypt) 2025	Champions	7	5	1	1	9	3
(Ghana) 2027	qualified						

=== COSAFA U-20 Challenge Cup record ===
COSAFA U-20 Challenge Cup
Hosts/Year	Result	GP	W	D*	L	GS	GA
1983 to 1990	did not enter						
(Eswatini) 1993	Quarter-finals	4	2	0	2	8	3
(Lesotho) 1995	Second Place	5	1	3	1	3	3
(Ghana) 1997	Unknown						
(South Africa) 1999	Second Place	6	4	1	1	15	6
(South Africa) 2000	Champions	3	0	1	2	3	7
(South Africa) 2001	Unknown						
(South Africa) 2002	Unknown						
(South Africa) 2003	Unknown						
(South Africa) 2004	Champions	Unknown					
(South Africa) 2005	Unknown						
(South Africa) 2006	Champions	Unknown					
(South Africa) 2007	Second Place	Unknown					
(South Africa) 2008	Champions	Unknown					
(South Africa) 2009	Champions	4	4	0	0	16	1
(Botswana) 2010	Group Stage	Unknown					
(Botswana) 2011	Group Stage	3	1	1	1	6	6
(Lesotho) 2013	Champions	5	4	1	0	7	0
(South Africa) 2016	Second Place	5	4	0	1	16	2
(Zambia) 2017	Champions	5	5	0	0	8	2
(Zambia) 2018	Champions	5	1	3	0	2	2
(Zambia) 2019	Second Place	5	3	1	1	12	6
(South Africa) 2020	Group Stage	3	1	2	0	9	2
(Eswatini) 2022	Third Place	5	3	0	2	11	7
(Mozambique) 2024	Champions	5	5	0	0	16	0
(Namibia) 2025	Champions	5	4	1	0	13	3
(Mozambique) 2026	Champions	5	5	0	0	13	3
