= 1997 African Youth Championship =

بطولة أفريقيا لكرة القدم للشباب 1997

Tournament details
- Host country: Morocco
- Dates: 23 March – 5 April
- Teams: 8

Final positions
- Champions: Morocco (1st title)
- Runners-up: South Africa
- Third place: Ivory Coast
- Fourth place: Ghana

The African Youth Championship 1997 was held in Morocco. It also served as qualification for the 1997 FIFA World Youth Championship.

== Qualification ==
=== First round ===
First round matches took place on 28-29 September and 19-20 October 1996. Togo and Malawi withdrew and Burundi was suspended by CAF following a coup d'état.

Team 1	Score	Team 2
Algeria	0-2	Tunisia
Mali	3-0	Mauritania
Burkina Faso	0-0	Guinea
Ghana	2-0	Senegal
Nigeria	5-1	Chad
Sudan	2-0	Kenya
Benin	0-1	Ivory Coast
Egypt	5-0	Ethiopia
Réunion	0-2	Zimbabwe
South Africa	2-0	Mauritius
Angola	3-1	Botswana
Tanzania	w/o	Burundi
Cameroon	w/o	Togo
Zambia	w/o	Malawi
Tunisia	1-3 (3-3 agg.)	Algeria
Guinea	1-1 (1-1 agg.)	Burkina Faso
Senegal	2-3 (2-5 agg.)	Ghana
Chad	2-1 (3-6 agg.)	Nigeria
Kenya	1-0 (1-2 agg.)	Sudan
Ethiopia	5-0 (5-5 agg., 1-2 p)	Egypt
Zimbabwe	5-0 (7-0 agg.)	Réunion
Mauritius	1-3 (1-5 agg.)	South Africa
Botswana	1-2 (2-5 agg.)	Angola

=== Second round ===
Round two matches took place on 21-22 December 1996 and 3-5 January 1997.

Team 1	Score	Team 2
Mali	3-2	Algeria
Nigeria	2-1	Sudan
Ivory Coast	5-3	Cameroon
Burkina Faso	1-1	Ghana
Egypt	2-1	Zimbabwe
South Africa	3-0	Tanzania
Zambia	1-0	Angola
Algeria		Mali
Sudan		Nigeria
Cameroon		Ivory Coast
Ghana		Burkina Faso
Zimbabwe		Egypt
Tanzania	0-1 (0-4 agg.)	South Africa
Angola	0-1 (0-2 agg.)	Zambia

== Teams ==
Last year's finalists Burundi were disqualified in the qualifying tournament. Eight teams entered the tournament:

- Ivory Coast
- Egypt
- Ghana
- Mali
- Morocco (host)
- South Africa
- Sudan
- Zambia

== Group stage ==
=== Group A ===
Group A matches took place on 23, 25 and 27 March 1997.

Team 1	Score	Team 2
Morocco	0-0	Egypt
Sudan	0-4	Ghana
Egypt	0-1	Ghana
Morocco	2-0	Sudan
Egypt	2-1	Sudan
Morocco	0-1	Ghana

Pos	Team	Pld	W	D	L	GF	GA	GD	Pts	Qualification
1	Ghana	3	3	0	0	6	0	+6	9	Advance to knockout stage
2	Morocco (H)	3	1	1	1	2	1	+1	4	Advance to knockout stage
3	Egypt	3	1	1	1	2	2	0	4	
4	Sudan	3	0	0	3	1	8	−7	0	

Rules for classification: Group tiebreakers
(H) Hosts

=== Group B ===
Group B matches took place on 24, 26 and 28 March 1997.

Team 1	Score	Team 2
Mali	2-2	Zambia
South Africa	0-1	Ivory Coast
Zambia	1-1	Ivory Coast
Mali	1-2	South Africa
South Africa	2-1	Zambia
Ivory Coast	4-1	Mali

Pos	Team	Pld	W	D	L	GF	GA	GD	Pts	Qualification
1	Ivory Coast	3	2	1	0	6	2	+4	7	Advance to knockout stage
2	South Africa	3	2	0	1	4	3	+1	6	Advance to knockout stage
3	Zambia	3	0	2	1	4	5	−1	2	
4	Mali	3	0	1	2	4	8	−4	1	

Rules for classification: Group tiebreakers

== Knockout stage ==
=== Semifinals ===
2 April 1997

Ghana	1 – 1	South Africa
Penalties
	3 – 4

Fès
2 April 1997

Morocco	2 – 1	Ivory Coast

Fès

=== Third place match ===
5 April 1997

Ivory Coast	2 – 0	Ghana

Meknès

=== Final ===
5 April 1997

Morocco	1 – 0	South Africa

Meknès

1997 African Youth Championship

Morocco
First title

== Qualification to World Youth Championship ==
The four best performing teams qualified for the 1997 FIFA World Youth Championship.

- Ivory Coast
- Ghana
- Morocco
- South Africa
