= Mayibongwe Mabuza =

Liswati footballer

Personal information
- Date of birth: 20 August 2003 (age 23)
- Place of birth: Manzini, Eswatini
- Position: Forward

Team information
- Current team: Manzini Sea Birds
- Number: 10

Senior career*
Years	Team	Apps	(Gls)
2019–2021	Vovovo		
2021–2024	Nsingizini Hotspurs		
2024–	Manzini Sea Birds		

International career^{‡}
2022	Eswatini U20	3	(1)
2025–	Eswatini	1	(1)
- * Club domestic league appearances and goals ‡ National team caps and goals as of 13:06, 19 May 2025 (UTC)

Mayibongwe Mabuza (born 20 August 2003) is a Liswati footballer who plays for Premier League of Eswatini club Manzini Sea Birds and the Eswatini national team.

== Club career ==
Mabuza demonstrated promise from an early age and was named the Player of the Season for the U-13 Premier League, which featured young players already in the academies of Premier League of Eswatini clubs. As a youth, he played for developmental sides SuperSport and Hurricane before signing his first senior contract with Vovovo in 2019.

In December 2021 it as announced that Mabuza had joined Nsingizini Hotspurs on a 1-year deal from Vovovo with a club option for an additional season. While a member of Nsingizini Hotspurs, the player was spotted by a scout from South African club Mamelodi Sundowns during the 2022 COSAFA U-20 Cup. The following summer, the scout arranged for Mabuza to travel to Italy for a three-week trial with US Città di Pontedera of Serie C. However, the trial was cut short and the player returned home because of a heart condition detected during a medical examination. Mabuza was also spotted by an Italian scout from Empoli which lead to additional trial invitations from clubs in Serie B during his time in Italy.

In June 2024, Mabuza was heavily linked with a move to fellow Premier League side Manzini Sea Birds with the move reportedly set to happen at the conclusion of his contract with Hotspurs. He continued his impressive league form with his new club, becoming an early contender for the league's top scorer award and earning honours including being named to the league's Team of the Week in February 2025.

== International career ==
Mabuza represented Eswatini at the youth level with both the national under-20 and under-23 sides. With the former, he scored the match-winning goal against Botswana in the 2022 COSAFA U-20 Cup. Mabuza made his senior international debut on 23 March 2025 in a 2026 FIFA World Cup qualification match against Mauritius. He scored his first senior goal in the same match to give Eswatini the lead before Mauritius scored a late equalizer to salvage the draw.

=== International goals ===
Last updated 19 May 2025.

No	Date	Venue	Opponent	Score	Result	Competition
1.	23 March 2025	Mbombela Stadium, Mbombela, South Africa	Mauritius	3–2	3–3	2026 FIFA World Cup qualification
Last updated 19 May 2025

=== International career statistics ===
As of match played 23 March 2025

Eswatini national team
Year	Apps	Goals
2025	1	1
Total	1	1

== Personal ==
Mabuza was born Raleigh Fitkin Memorial Hospital in Manzini but grew up in Mbabane. He became interested in football at a young age because of his mother Gcebile Dlamini who played herself for Kappa Ladies FC in the Eswatini Women's League. He got his nickname "Suarez" from the prolific Uruguayan striker Luis Suárez whom Mabuzo watched play at the 2010 FIFA World Cup hosted by neighboring South Africa.
