= Samson Ngulube =

Zambian footballer

Personal information
- Date of birth: 1 December 2005 (age 20)
- Place of birth: Lusaka, Zambia
- Height: 1.77 m (5 ft 9 1/2 in)
- Position: Defender

Team information
- Current team: IFK Mariehamn
- Number: 31

Senior career*
Years	Team	Apps	(Gls)
2022–2026	Kafue Celtic		
2026–	IFK Mariehamn	21	(0)

International career^{‡}
2025–	Zambia U20		
- * Club domestic league appearances and goals as of 13 November 2026 ‡ National team caps and goals as of 20:07, 28 July 2026 (UTC)

Samson Ngulube is a Zambian professional footballer who plays for Veikkausliiga club IFK Mariehamn.

== Club career ==
Domestically, Ngulube played for Kafue Celtic in the Zambia National League and was a key contributor as the club pushed for promotion to the Zambia Super League.

In October 2025, he went on trial with IFK Mariehamn of the Veikkausliiga, the top flight of football in Finland. In January 2026, it was announced that the Finnish club had acquired the player on a permanent transfer ahead of the 2026 season. The player signed a two-year contract with a club option for an additional year.

== International career ==
Ngulube was part of the Zambia U20 squad for the 2025 U-20 Africa Cup of Nations.
