= Marlon Harrison =

Liberian footballer

Personal information
- Full name: Marlon Ricardo Harrison
- Date of birth: 19 September 1998 (age 28)
- Place of birth: Point Four, Liberia
- Position: Midfielder

Team information
- Current team: LISCR FC

Senior career*
Years	Team	Apps	(Gls)
2018	Keitrace FC		
2019–	LISCR FC		

International career^{‡}
- Liberia U20
2019–	Liberia	1	(0)
- * Club domestic league appearances and goals ‡ National team caps and goals as of 02:15, 30 March 2022 (UTC)

Marlon Ricardo Harrison (born 19 September 1998) is a Liberian professional footballer who plays as a midfielder for Liberian First Division club LISCR FC and the Liberia national team.

== Controversy ==
In April 2020, Harrison and six of his Liberia under-20s teammates appeared for a Liberia Football Association (LFA) disciplinary hearing. The players had violated the national team's code of conduct and camping regulations during the 2019 WAFU U-20 Tournament in Guinea. Harrison had allegedly insulted the technical staff for substituting him during the match against Mali on 30 November 2019, in the presence of the head of delegation Charles Massaley. Harrison also allegedly insulted Massaley, and accused administrative manager Ebenezer Barclay of deducting the players' daily wages by US$60 at the Guinea–Sierra Leone border on 2 December.

In December 2021, Harrison was handed a three-month suspension without salary by his club LISCR FC due to a violation of the club's code of conduct. After spending one month on the sidelines, his suspension was lifted and he returned to training.

== Honors ==
LISCR FC

- Liberian FA Cup: 2019
