= Namibia national under-20 football team =

National under-20 association football team representing Namibia

Namibia-U20
- Nickname: Brave Warriors
- Association: Namibia Football Association
- Confederation: CAF (Africa)
- Sub-confederation: COSAFA (Southern Africa)
- Head coach: Jerimi Zimmer
- Home stadium: Independence Stadium
- FIFA code: NAM
| First colours | Second colours | Third colours |

First international
- Lesotho 3–0 Namibia (Maseru, Lesotho; 1990)

Biggest win
- Seychelles 1–6 Namibia (Seychelles; 4 December 2007)

Biggest defeat
- South Africa 9–0 Namibia (Dobsonville, South Africa; 6 December 2009)

U-20 Africa Cup of Nations
- Appearances: 1 (first in 2021)
- Best result: Group stage (2021)

The Namibia national under-20 football team, known as the Young Warriors (men) and Young Gladiators (women), represents Namibia in association football at an under-20 age level. They have never qualified for the World Cup or the Olympics.

== Tournament history ==
FIFA U-20 World Cup
| Year | Result | GP | W | D | L | GS | GA |
|---|---|---|---|---|---|---|---|
| (Tunisia) 1977 | Did not qualify | | | | | | |
| (Japan) 1979 | Did not qualify | | | | | | |
| (Australia) 1981 | Did not qualify | | | | | | |
| (Mexico) 1983 | Did not qualify | | | | | | |
| (Soviet Union) 1985 | Did not qualify | | | | | | |
| (Chile) 1987 | Did not qualify | | | | | | |
| (Saudi Arabia) 1989 | Did not qualify | | | | | | |
| (Portugal) 1991 | Did not qualify | | | | | | |
| (Australia) 1993 | Did not qualify | | | | | | |
| (Qatar) 1995 | Did not qualify | | | | | | |
| (Malaysia) 1997 | Did not qualify | | | | | | |
| (Nigeria) 1999 | Did not qualify | | | | | | |
| (Argentina) 2001 | Did not qualify | | | | | | |
| (United Arab Emirates) 2003 | Did not qualify | | | | | | |
| (Netherlands) 2005 | Did not qualify | | | | | | |
| (Canada) 2007 | Did not qualify | | | | | | |
| (Egypt) 2009 | Did not qualify | | | | | | |
| (Colombia) 2011 | Did not qualify | | | | | | |
| (Turkey) 2013 | Did not qualify | | | | | | |
| (New Zealand) 2015 | Did not qualify | | | | | | |
| (South Korea) 2017 | Did not qualify | | | | | | |
| (Poland) 2019 | Did not qualify | | | | | | |
| (Argentina) 2023 | Did not qualify | | | | | | |
| (Chile) 2025 | Did not qualify | | | | | | |
| (Azerbaijan) (Uzbekistan) 2027 | TBD | | | | | | |
| Total | 0/25 | 0 | 0 | 0 | 0 | 0 | 0 |

Africa U-20 Cup of Nations
| Year | Result | GP | W | D | L | GS | GA |
|---|---|---|---|---|---|---|---|
| 1979 | Did not enter | | | | | | |
| 1981 | Did not enter | | | | | | |
| 1983 | Did not enter | | | | | | |
| 1985 | Did not enter | | | | | | |
| 1987 | Did not enter | | | | | | |
| 1989 | Did not enter | | | | | | |
| (Egypt) 1991 | Did not enter | | | | | | |
| (Mauritius) 1993 | Did not enter | | | | | | |
| (Nigeria) 1995 | Did not enter | | | | | | |
| (Morocco) 1997 | Did not enter | | | | | | |
| (Ghana) 1999 | Did not enter | | | | | | |
| (Ethiopia) 2001 | Did not qualify | | | | | | |
| (Burkina Faso) 2003 | Did not qualify | | | | | | |
| (Benin) 2005 | Did not qualify | | | | | | |
| (Republic of the Congo) 2007 | Did not qualify | | | | | | |
| (Rwanda) 2009 | Did not qualify | | | | | | |
| (South Africa) 2011 | Did not qualify | | | | | | |
| (Algeria) 2013 | Did not qualify | | | | | | |
| (Senegal) 2015 | Did not qualify | | | | | | |
| (Zambia) 2017 | Did not qualify | | | | | | |
| (Niger) 2019 | Did not qualify | | | | | | |
| (Mauritania) 2021 | Group stage | 3 | 0 | 1 | 2 | 1 | 4 |
| (Egypt) 2023 | Did not qualify | | | | | | |
| Total | 1/22 | 3 | 0 | 1 | 2 | 1 | 4 |

== Current squad ==
The following players were named in the squad for the 2025 COSAFA U-20 Championship, played in July 2025.

| No. | Pos. | Player | Date of birth (age) | Club |
|---|---|---|---|---|
| 1 | GK | Rodriques Ganeb | 2006 or 2007 (age 18) | (Namibia Football Association) CBS Talents |
| 2 | MF | Lukas Sakeus | 2006 or 2007 (age 18) | (Namibia Football Association) Julinho Sporting F.C. |
| 3 | DF | Mauricio Smith | 2008 or 2009 (age 16) | (Namibia Football Association) Kasaona FA |
| 4 | DF | Mpumelelo Malgas | 2008 or 2009 (age 16) | (Namibia Football Association) DS Academy |
| 5 | DF | Antonius Guiseb | 2007 or 2008 (age 17) | (Namibia Football Association) TUKS |
| 6 | MF | Fabio Awaseb | 2006 or 2007 (age 18) | (Namibia Football Association) CBS Talents |
| 7 | FW | Rashid Naobeb | 2006 or 2007 (age 18) | (Namibia Football Association) CBS Talents |
| 8 | DF | Promise Haitamba | 2007 or 2008 (age 17) | (Namibia Football Association) Oshana NAMPOL |
| 9 | FW | Ronald Kandjou | 2008 or 2009 (age 16) | (Namibia Football Association) Kasaona FA |
| 10 | MF | Martino Kauzuu | 2006 or 2007 (age 18) | (Namibia Football Association) DTS FC |
| 11 | FW | Vitario Brunzel | 2007 or 2008 (age 17) | (Namibia Football Association) DTS Academy |
| 12 | DF | Leopold Hakushika | 2007 or 2008 (age 17) | (Namibia Football Association) WHK Gym |
| 13 | MF | Muhupua Tjipuka | 2006 or 2007 (age 18) | (Namibia Football Association) Kasaona FA |
| 14 | MF | Vygotsky Nasima | 2006 or 2007 (age 18) | (Namibia Football Association) Orlando Pirates S.C. |
| 15 | MF | Nicolas Deckenbrock | 2007 or 2008 (age 17) | (Namibia Football Association) Eagles PA |
| 16 | GK | Mcheni Kavendji | 2007 or 2008 (age 17) | (Namibia Football Association) Outjo FA |
| 17 | MF | Robinho van Wyk | 2006 or 2007 (age 18) | (Namibia Football Association) DTS FC |
| 18 | DF | Everett Bell | 2007 or 2008 (age 17) | (Football Australia) Central Coast Mariners FCA |
| 19 | FW | Andriano Gawab | 2007 or 2008 (age 17) | (Namibia Football Association) CBS Talents |
| 20 | DF | Onesmus Timoteus | 2006 or 2007 (age 18) | (Namibia Football Association) CBS Talents |
