= Oshwin Andries =

South African footballer (2003–2023)

Personal information
- Date of birth: 24 February 2003
- Place of birth: South Africa
- Date of death: 4 February 2023 (aged 19)
- Place of death: Paarl, South Africa
- Positions: Defender; midfielder

Youth career
- Maties Academy
- Gleneagles
- 2018–2021: Stellenbosch

Senior career*
| Years | Team | Apps | (Gls) |
| 2021–2023 | Stellenbosch | 10 | (1) |
| Total | | 10 | (1) |

International career
| 2022 | South Africa U20 | 4 | (2) |
| 2022 | South Africa U23 | | |
- * Club domestic league appearances and goals

Oshwin Andries (24 February 2003 – 4 February 2023) was a South African soccer player who played as a defender or midfielder in the South African Premier Division for Stellenbosch.

== Club career ==
Andries played for local youth sides Maties Academy and Gleneagles, before joining professional team Stellenbosch in 2018. He progressed through the academy, notably winning the South African reserve competition, the DStv Diski Challenge, before going on to win the Premier League Next Gen Cup in England, scoring from the half-way line in a 7–2 win over Leicester City in the final.

Following an injury crisis at Stellenbosch during the 2022–23 season, Andries was drafted into the first team, featuring at centre-back in a 1–1 draw with Orlando Pirates, with his performance being described as "near perfect" by broadcaster SuperSport. He scored his first and only goal for the club three days later, in a 3–1 win over Royal AM; receiving the ball on the edge of his own area, he drove forward before passing to a teammate, receiving it back and scoring. In doing so, he became Stellenbosch's youngest ever goal-scorer in the South African top flight.

== International career ==
Andries represented South Africa at under-20 and under-23 level, captaining the former.

== Death and subsequent investigation ==
On 29 January 2023, Andries was having drinks at a bar in Klapmuts with four others, including his niece, Nadene Hartman, and his girlfriend, Ruché van Rooyen. According to Van Rooyen, after a man had bumped into her accidentally, Andries had jokingly asked him why he had done so. The man took his joke seriously, and an argument ensued, which led to a fistfight between the man and Andries, according to Hartman.

Van Rooyen stated that the man returned later with a knife, and began stabbing multiple people before stabbing Andries repeatedly, with the footballer receiving wounds to his head and lower back. After his attacker had fled, Andries was taken to a hospital in Stellenbosch, but was discharged just five hours later after his wounds had been bandaged. Over the next few days, he spent his time between his mother and girlfriend's homes, and even attended Stellenbosch training sessions – though he was not involved – before complaining of pain. His mother took him to a private doctor, who cleaned his wounds and gave him stronger painkillers, but after this did not help, his mother decided to take him from his girlfriend's house to a hospital in Paarl. He reportedly stopped breathing on the journey to the hospital, while in his mother's arms, and was confirmed dead on his arrival at the hospital on 4 February 2023.

The family of the alleged perpetrator reportedly fled their family home, with the sister of the alleged stating that they "lived in fear because people want to kill [her] brother", after a crowd of people had invaded their home on the night of the incident. She also stated that alcohol had been involved, and that the police had turned them away when her brother went to hand himself in. Andries's mother stated that she had not received an apology or condolences from the family of the alleged.

His funeral was held on 18 February 2023, where hundreds gathered to pay their respects. On what would have been his 20th birthday, his club, Stellenbosch, retired his number 25 jersey in his honour. In February 2024, a year after his death, the inaugural Andries Memorial Festival, an under-11 sports festival, was held.

In June 2024 a man was arrested on charges of attempted murder, as prosecutors decided Andries died as a result of medical complications, not the initial stab wounds. Following the arrest, Andries's mother stated that the accused should "rot in jail".

== Career statistics ==
=== Club ===
Appearances and goals by club, season and competition
| Club | Season | League | | | Cup | | Other | | Total | |
| Club | Season | Division | Apps | Goals | Apps | Goals | Apps | Goals | Apps | Goals |
|---|---|---|---|---|---|---|---|---|---|---|
| Stellenbosch | 2021–22 | DStv Premiership | 2 | 0 | 0 | 0 | 0 | 0 | 2 | 0 |
| Stellenbosch | 2022–23 | DStv Premiership | 8 | 1 | 0 | 0 | 1 (Note: Appearance in the MTN 8) | 0 | 9 | 1 |
| Career total | | | 10 | 1 | 0 | 0 | 1 | 0 | 11 | 1 |
