= Khaly =

Angolan footballer (born 2003)

Personal information
- Full name: Domingos José Gabriel Bandeira
- Date of birth: 27 November 2003 (age 22)
- Place of birth: Luanda, Angola
- Height: 1.92 m (6 ft 4 in)
- Position: Centre-back

Team information
- Current team: Casa Pia
- Number: 3

Youth career
- Primeiro de Agosto

Senior career*
Years	Team	Apps	(Gls)
2021–2024	Primeiro de Agosto		
2024–2025	Dila Gori	26	(0)
2025–	Casa Pia	13	(0)

International career^{‡}
2022	Angola U-20		(1)
2024–	Angola	3	(0)
Medal record
Men's football
Representing Angola
COSAFA Cup
Winner	2024 South Africa
- * Club domestic league appearances and goals as of 18 May 2026 ‡ National team caps and goals as of 02:01, 5 June 2026 (UTC)

Domingos José Gabriel Bandeira (born 27 November 2003), better known as Khaly, is an Angolan professional football player who plays as centre-back for Casa Pia and the Angola national team.

== Career ==
A product of the Angolan club Primeiro de Agosto, Khaly moved to the Georgian club Dila Gori in 2024 in the Erovnuli Liga. On 31 January 2025, he transferred to Casa Pia in the Portuguese Primeira Liga.

== International career ==
Khaly was part of the Angola national team that won the 2024 COSAFA Cup, a 5–0 win over Namibia on 7 July 2024.

== Personal life ==
Khaly received his nickname to honour the former Angola international footballer Kali.

== Honours ==
Angola

- COSAFA Cup: 2024
