= Gift Mphande =

Zambian footballer (born 2003)

Personal information
- Full name: Gift Prosper Mphande
- Date of birth: 19 November 2003 (age 22)
- Place of birth: Lusaka, Zambia
- Height: 1.93 m (6 ft 4 in)
- Position: Centre-back

Team information
- Current team: ZESCO United

Senior career*
Years	Team	Apps	(Gls)
2022–2024	Atletico Lusaka		
2023–2024	→ Hapoel Rishon LeZion (loan)	30	(0)
2024–	Hapoel Rishon LeZion	29	(0)
2025–	→ ZESCO United	0	(0)

International career^{‡}
2023–	Zambia U23	3	(0)
2023–	Zambia	14	(0)
- * Club domestic league appearances and goals as of 15 June 2025 ‡ National team caps and goals as of 23 December 2025

Gift Prosper Mphande (born 19 November 2003) is a Zambian professional footballer who plays as a centre-back for Zambian club ZESCO United and the Zambia national team.

== Club career ==
Mphande started his career in the Zambia National Division One club Atletico Lusaka.

On 22 August 2023 he signed for the Liga Leumit club Hapoel Rishon LeZion. On 24 August 2023 he made his debut in the 1–0 win against Ihud Bnei Shefa-'Amr.

== International career ==
On 21 November 2023 Mphande made his debut for the Zambia national football team at the 1–2 defeat to Niger.

Mphande was included in the squad for the 2023 Africa Cup of Nations.

On 10 December 2025, Mphande was called up to the Zambia squad for the 2025 Africa Cup of Nations.
