= Angola national under-20 football team =

National under-20 association football team representing Angola

Angola U-20
- Nickname: Palanquinhas
- Association: Angolan Football Federation
- Confederation: CAF (Africa)
- Head coach: (Angola) Flavio Amado
- Home stadium: Estádio dos Coqueiros
- FIFA code: ANG
First colours	Second colours

African U-20 Championship
- Appearances: 13 (first in 1983)
- Best result: Winners (2001)

FIFA U-20 World Cup
- Appearances: 1 (first in 2001)
- Best result: Round of 16 (2001)

The Angola national under-20 football team is the national under-20 football team of Angola and is controlled by the Angolan Football Federation. The team competes in the African U-20 Championship and the FIFA U-20 World Cup, which is held every four years.

== Honours ==
- African U-20 Championship:
  - Winners (1): 2001
- Losofonia Games:
  - Runner-Up in 2006
  - Third place in 2009

== Competitive record ==
=== FIFA U-20 World Cup record ===
FIFA U-20 World Cup record
Year	Round	GP	W	D^{1}	L	GS	GA
(Tunisia) 1977	Did not qualify						
(Japan) 1979	Did not qualify						
(Australia) 1981	Did not qualify						
(Mexico) 1983	Did not qualify						
(Soviet Union) 1985	Did not qualify						
(Chile) 1987	Did not qualify						
(Saudi Arabia) 1989	Did not qualify						
(Portugal) 1991	Did not qualify						
(Australia) 1993	Did not qualify						
(Qatar) 1995	Did not qualify						
(Malaysia) 1997	Did not qualify						
(Nigeria) 1999	Did not qualify						
(Argentina) 2001	Round of 16	4	1	2	1	3	4
(United Arab Emirates) 2003	Did not qualify						
(Netherlands) 2005	Did not qualify						
(Canada) 2007	Did not qualify						
(Egypt) 2009	Did not qualify						
(Colombia) 2011	Did not qualify						
(Turkey) 2013	Did not qualify						
(New Zealand) 2015	Did not qualify						
(South Korea) 2017	Did not qualify						
(Poland) 2019	Did not qualify						
(Argentina) 2023	Did not qualify						
(Chile) 2025	Did not qualify						
(Azerbaijan) (Uzbekistan) 2027	To be determined						
(Armenia) (Georgia (country)) 2029	To be determined						
Total	1/26	4	1	2	1	3	4

=== CAF U-20 Championship record ===
Africa U-20 Cup of Nations
Appearances: 3 / 24
Year	Round	Position	GP	W	D	L	GS	GA	GD
1979	did not participate								
1981	did not participate								
1983	First	–	2	0	0	2	1	3	-2
1985	First	–	4	1	0	3	2	7	-5
1987	did not participate								
1989	Preliminary	–	2	1	0	1	3	4	-1
(Egypt) 1991	did not participate								
(Mauritius) 1993	did not participate								
(Nigeria) 1995	Second	–	6	3	2	1	11	7	+4
(Morocco) 1997	did not participate								
(Ghana) 1999	Group stage	–	7	4	0	3	14	18	-4
(Ethiopia) 2001	Champions	–	9	5	2	2	20	8	+12
(Burkina Faso) 2003	First	–	2	1	0	1	2	5	-3
(Benin) 2005	Group stage	–	7	2	2	3	7	6	+1
(Republic of the Congo) 2007	First	–	2	0	1	1	2	3	-1
(Rwanda) 2009	First	–	2	1	0	1	2	5	-3
(South Africa) 2011	First	–	2	1	0	1	2	5	-3
(Algeria) 2013	First	–	3	1	1	1	2	2	0
(Senegal) 2015	Second	–	2	0	0	2	1	4	-3
(Zambia) 2017	Third	–	4	1	0	3	3	6	-3
(Niger) 2019	Second	–	2	1	0	1	3	5	-2
(Mauritania) 2021		-	4	2	0	2	6	3	+3
(Egypt) 2023		-	5	2	0	3	15(4)	4(7)	+11
(Egypt) 2025		-	3	2	0	1	4	2	+2
Total	-	-	69	28	8	32	98	97	+1

Starting with the 2011 edition qualification has been done. Starting with the 2021 edition, qualification has been done by regional phases.

=== COSAFA U-20 Cup record ===
COSAFA U-20 Cup
Appearances: 7 / 7
Year	Position	G	W	D	L	GS	GA	GD
(Zambia) 2017	Group stage	3	0	1	2	0	2	-2
(Zambia) 2018	Third place	5	2	2	1	7	3	+4
(Zambia) 2019	Third place	5	4	0	1	18	5	+13
(South Africa) 2020	Third place	4	2	0	2	6	3	+3
(Eswatini) 2022	Fourth place	5	2	0	3	15(4)	4(7)	+11
(Mozambique) 2024	Semi finals	3	2	0	1	4	2	+2
(Mozambique) 2026	Group stage	3	2	0	1	9	2	+7

== Current squad ==
The following players were called for the 2019 Africa U-20 Cup of Nations qualification against Malawi on 13 May 2018.

No.	Pos.	Player	Date of birth (age)	Caps	Goals	Club
1	GK	Júlio da Costa	3 November 1999 (age 26)			(Angolan Football Federation)
12	GK	Teodoro Tchissingui Beny	20 February 2000 (age 26)			(Angolan Football Federation) Recreativo da Caála
3	DF	Miguel Daniel Tó Zé	28 January 2000 (age 26)			(Angolan Football Federation) A.F.A.
4	DF	Moisés Amor	28 February 2000 (age 26)			(Angolan Football Federation) Académica do Lobito
13	DF	José Venâncio de Oliveira	31 December 2000 (age 25)			(Angolan Football Federation)
16	DF	Daniel Kilola Danilson	6 July 1999 (age 27)			(Angolan Football Federation) Petro de Luanda
17	DF	Paulo Bravo Rafa	11 September 2000 (age 26)			(Angolan Football Federation) Kabuscorp
2	MF	Bráulio Manuel	14 September 1999 (age 27)			(Angolan Football Federation)
5	MF	Arilson Jorge Ayson	13 May 1999 (age 27)			(Angolan Football Federation) Progresso
6	MF	António Baptista	14 March 2000 (age 26)			(Angolan Football Federation)
7	MF	Vanilson Zeu	20 March 1999 (age 27)			(Angolan Football Federation) 1º de Agosto
8	MF	Edivaldo Quinanga Jamanta	30 July 1999 (age 27)			(Angolan Football Federation) 1º de Maio
11	MF	João Mucuia	8 September 1999 (age 27)			(Angolan Football Federation) A.F.A.
14	MF	Pedro Agostinho	17 June 1998 (age 28)			(Angolan Football Federation) Petro de Luanda
9	FW	Jelson Mivo	21 April 2000 (age 26)			(Angolan Football Federation) 1º de Agosto
10	FW	Chabalala	23 September 1999 (age 27)			(Angolan Football Federation) Académica do Lobito
15	FW	Adão Cassule Coxe	8 May 1999 (age 27)			(Angolan Football Federation) Real Sambila
18	FW	Camilo Ngongue	6 April 2000 (age 26)			(Angolan Football Federation) Académica do Lobito

== See also ==
- Angola national under-17 football team
- Angola national football team
