= Mozambique national under-20 football team =

National youth association football team

Mozambique
- Nickname: Os Mambas (The Mambas)
- Association: Federação Moçambicana de Futebol
- Confederation: CAF (Africa)
- Sub-confederation: COSAFA (Southern Africa)
- Head coach: (Mozambique) Dário Monteiro
- Captain: ?
- Home stadium: Estádio do Zimpeto
- FIFA code: MOZ
First colours	Second colours

First international
- Mozambique 0–3 Zambia (Maputo, Mozambique; 19 September 1984)

Biggest win
- Mozambique 5–1 Seychelles (Mozambique 8 October 2022)

Biggest defeat
- Zambia 5–0 Mozambique (Lusaka, Zambia; 30 September 1984)

U-20 Africa Cup of Nations
- Appearances: 2 (first in 2021)
- Best result: Group stage (2021, 2023)

COSAFA U-20 Cup
- Appearances: 22 (first in 1986)
- Best result: Winners: 2020

The Mozambique national under-20 football team (Portuguese: Seleção Moçambicana de Futebol) represents Mozambique in men's U-20 football team and is controlled by the Mozambican Football Federation (MFF), the governing body for football in Mozambique. In 2021 the team has qualified for the first time 2021 Africa U-20 Cup of Nations.

== Players ==
The following squad called up for 2021 Africa U-20 Cup of Nations.

No.	Pos.	Player	Date of birth (age)	Club
3	DF	Salomão Lichinga	5 January 2001 (aged 20)	(Mozambican Football Federation) Maxaquene
4	DF	Ricardo Nampula	24 April 2003 (aged 17)	(Mozambican Football Federation) Associaçao Black Bull
5	DF	Justo Chonga	14 February 2003 (aged 18)	(Mozambican Football Federation) Associaçao Black Bull
6	MF	Tiago Chidenguele	3 December 2001 (aged 19)	(Mozambican Football Federation) Ferroviário de Maputo
7	FW	Sérgio Chongoene	17 May 2002 (aged 18)	(Portuguese Football Federation) CD Nacional
8	MF	Luís Chibuto	14 October 2003 (aged 17)	(Mozambican Football Federation) Associaçao Black Bull
9	FW	Cipriano Chiconela	3 August 2003 (aged 17)	(Mozambican Football Federation) Associaçao Black Bull
10	FW	Mateus Inharrime	25 May 2002 (aged 18)	(Mozambican Football Federation) Associaçao Black Bull
11	FW	Lourenço Chiluvo	22 February 2001 (aged 19)	(Portuguese Football Federation) Varzim
12	GK	Rolando Mecuburi	8 May 2004 (aged 16)	(Mozambican Football Federation) Associaçao Black Bull
13	GK	Simão Chibabava	1 March 2002 (aged 18)	(Mozambican Football Federation) Maxaquene
14	MF	Fabiano Maganja	20 July 2001 (aged 19)	(Mozambican Football Federation) Ferroviário da Beira
16	FW	Justino Chiramba	18 March 2003 (aged 17)	(Mozambican Football Federation) Associaçao Black Bull
17	MF	Leocádio Mtwara	14 March 2002 (aged 18)	(Mozambican Football Federation) Associaçao Black Bull
18	MF	Herculano Matamula	23 January 2002 (aged 19)	(Mozambican Football Federation) Associaçao Black Bull
19	DF	Fabrício Nangade	6 September 2001 (aged 19)	(Mozambican Football Federation) Associaçao Black Bull
20	MF	Roberto Chiluvo	2 September 2001 (aged 19)	(Mozambican Football Federation) Desportivo de Maputo
22	GK	Rodrigo Mueda	10 December 2002 (aged 18)	(Mozambican Football Federation) Chingale de Tete
23	FW	Inocêncio Chinde	26 January 2001 (aged 20)	(Mozambican Football Federation) ASC Nampula
24	GK	Inácio Marromeu	9 June 2003 (aged 17)	(Mozambican Football Federation) Ferroviário de Nampula
25	DF	Maurício Guijá	18 August 2002 (aged 18)	(Mozambican Football Federation) Costa do Sol
26	DF	António Namapa	15 April 2001 (aged 19)	(Mozambican Football Federation) Ferroviário da Beira
27	FW	Leopoldo Quissico	17 May 2002 (aged 18)	(Portuguese Football Federation) Sertanense
31	MF	Joaquim Mocuba	15 March 2003 (aged 17)	(Mozambican Football Federation) Costa do Sol

== Competitive records ==
=== FIFA U-20 World Cup ===
Year	Round	Position	Pld	W	D	L	GF	GA
1977–2025	Did not qualify							
(Azerbaijan) (Uzbekistan) 2027	To be determined							

=== Africa U-20 Cup of Nations ===
Hosts/Year	Result	GP	W	D*	L	GS	GA
1991–1997	Did not enter						
1999–2019	Did not qualify						
(Mauritania) 2021	Group stage	3	0	0	3	1	8
(Egypt) 2023	Group stage	3	0	1	2	0	5
Total	2/17	6	0	1	5	1	13

*Draws include knockout matches decided by penalty shootout.

=== COSAFA U-20 Cup ===
Hosts/Year	Result	GP	W	D	L	GS	GA
1983–1985	Did not enter						
(Malawi) 1986	Group stage	1	0	0	1	0	2
(Botswana) 1988	Results not recorded						
(Lesotho) 1990	Withdrew from tournament						
(Zimbabwe) 1990	Did not participate						
Total	1/6	1	0	0	1	0	2

*Draws include knockout matches decided by penalty shootout.
