= Mauritius national under-20 football team =

National under-20 association football team representing Mauritius

Mauritius Under 20
- Nickname: Maurice Espoirs
- Association: Mauritius Football Association
- Confederation: CAF (Africa)
- Head coach: (Mauritius) Rajen Dorasami
- Captain: Rony Aubeeluck
- Home stadium: Stade Germain Comarmond
- FIFA code: MRI
First colours	Second colours

Biggest win
- Mauritius 3 – 1 Zambia (Bambous, Mauritius; August 8, 2010)

The Mauritius national under-20 football team is the national under-20 football team of Mauritius, controlled by the Mauritius Football Association. The Mauritius national under-20 football team is composed of the 20 best national football players, aged 20 years or less, selected from the 4 CTR's (Centre Technique Regional) spread throughout Mauritius and from the 1st Division senior and junior national teams. The main tournaments the team competes in are the COSAFA U-20 Challenge Cup, organized in November every year in South Africa, and the African Youth Championship, held every two years. It has never qualified for the FIFA U-20 World Cup. The players in the team are being prepared to join the Mauritius national football team in the coming years. The best result for the team to date has been a 3-1 win over the Zambia national under-20 football team in 2011 African Youth Championship qualifying.

== Competition records ==
=== FIFA U-20 World Cup ===
- 1977 to 2025 - Did not enter / Did not qualify

=== African Youth Championship ===
- 1977 - Did not enter
- 1979 - Second Round
- 1981 to 1991 - Did not enter / Did not qualify
- 1993 to 1995 - Group Stage
- 1997 to 2011 - Did not enter / Did not qualify

=== COSAFA U-20 Challenge Cup ===
- 1983 to 2009 - Did not enter / Did not qualify
- 2010 - Group Stage

== Players ==
=== Current squad ===
The following players were named to the Mauritius U-20 squad for the 2011 COSAFA U-20 Cup.

No.	Pos.	Player	Date of birth (age)	Caps	Goals	Club
1	GK	Christopher Caserne				(Mauritius Football Association) Centre Technique Regional
13	GK	Ashley Oomajee				(Mauritius Football Association) Centre Technique Regional
9	DF	Clarel Antoine				(Mauritius Football Association) Centre Technique Regional
14	DF	Rony Aubeeluck (c)				(Mauritius Football Association) Centre Technique Regional
15	DF	Brendon Citorah				(Mauritius Football Association) Centre Technique Regional
8	DF	Steven Félix				(Mauritius Football Association) Centre Technique Regional
6	DF	Bradley Moedine				(Mauritius Football Association) Centre Technique Regional
10	DF	Jean-Patrice Roselane				(Mauritius Football Association) Centre Technique Regional
4	MF	Herzy Calambé				(Mauritius Football Association) Centre Technique Regional
3	MF	John Far				(Mauritius Football Association) Centre Technique Regional
18	MF	Fabien Louise				(Mauritius Football Association) Centre Technique Regional
16	MF	Alexandre Papillon				(Mauritius Football Association) Centre Technique Regional
2	MF	Warren Soopaul				(Mauritius Football Association) Centre Technique Regional
24	FW	Jérémie Jeannette				(Mauritius Football Association) Centre Technique Regional
21	FW	Christ Jolicoeur				(Mauritius Football Association) Centre Technique Regional
7	FW	Yannick Moutou				(Mauritius Football Association) Centre Technique Regional
12	FW	Juliano Pudoo				(Mauritius Football Association) Centre Technique Regional
22		Julien Antoine				(Mauritius Football Association) Centre Technique Regional
20		Asraf Jowrin				(Mauritius Football Association) Centre Technique Regional
23		Yohan Larhubarbe				(Mauritius Football Association) Centre Technique Regional
19		Didier Legrand				(Mauritius Football Association) Centre Technique Regional
25		Gregory Lomelette				(Mauritius Football Association) Centre Technique Regional
11		Pascal Oudel				(Mauritius Football Association) Centre Technique Regional
5		Louis Donovan Pierre				(Mauritius Football Association) Centre Technique Regional
17		Murvin Thomas				(Mauritius Football Association) Centre Technique Regional

=== Recent callups ===
The following players have also been called up to the national under-20 squad within the last twelve months:

Pos.	Player	Date of birth (age)	Caps	Goals	Club	Latest call-up

== Staff ==
=== Current staff ===
Name	Nat	Position
Rajen Dorasami	(Mauritius)	Head coach
Victor Thomas	(Mauritius)	Assistant coach
Rohit Teeluckchand	(Mauritius)	Goalkeeping coach
Beemon Madhoo	(Mauritius)	Physiotherapist
Mohunlall Seeruttun	(Mauritius)	Head of delegation

== Schedule ==
Win Tie Loss

=== Recent results ===
12/06/10 2010 COSAFA U-20 Cup	Mauritius U-20	1 – 2	Angola U-20	Molepolole Stadium, Molepolole, Botswana
15:00 UTC+2	32' Marvin Ramsamy; (yellow card) 79' Kenny Ramsamy	(Report)	4' Ambriz; 18'	Referee: (Zimbabwe) Ruzive Ruzive

12/08/10 2010 COSAFA U-20 Cup	Zambia U-20	2 – 1	Mauritius U-20	UB Stadium, Gaborone, Botswana
15:00 UTC+2

=== Upcoming fixtures ===
12/02/11 2011 COSAFA U-20 Cup	South Africa U-20	v	Mauritius U-20	UB Stadium, Gaborone, Botswana
14:30 UTC+2

12/04/11 2011 COSAFA U-20 Cup	Mauritius U-20	v	Zambia U-20	Molepolole Stadium, Molepolole, Botswana
20:00 UTC+2

12/06/11 2011 COSAFA U-20 Cup	Tanzania U-20	v	Mauritius U-20	UB Stadium, Gaborone, Botswana
17:00 UTC+2

=== 2011 COSAFA U-20 Challenge Cup ===
==== Group C ====
Team	Pld	W	D	L	GF	GA	GD	Pts
Mauritius								
South Africa								
Tanzania								
Zambia								

== See also ==
- Mauritius national under-17 football team
- Mauritius national football team
