= Lesotho national under-20 football team =

National under-20 association football team representing Lesotho

Lesotho U-20
- Nickname: Likuena (Crocodiles)
- Association: Lesotho Football Association (LeFA)
- Confederation: CAF (Africa)
- Sub-confederation: COSAFA (Southern Africa)
- Home stadium: Setsoto Stadium
| First colours | Second colours |

U-20 Africa Cup of Nations
- Appearances: 3 (first in 1989)
- Best result: Group stage (2005, 2011)

FIFA U-20 World Cup
- Appearances: None

The Lesotho national under-20 football team, nicknamed the Crocodiles, represents Lesotho in international youth football competitions. Its primary role is the development of players in preparation for the senior national team. The team competes in a variety of competitions, including the biennial FIFA U-20 World Cup and the U-20 Africa Cup of Nations, which is the top competitions for this age group.

== Competitive record ==
=== FIFA U-20 World Cup record ===
FIFA U-20 World Cup record
| Year | Round | GP | W | D^{1} | L | GS | GA |
|---|---|---|---|---|---|---|---|
| (Tunisia) 1977 | Did not qualify | | | | | | |
| (Japan) 1979 | Did not qualify | | | | | | |
| (Australia) 1981 | Did not qualify | | | | | | |
| (Mexico) 1983 | Did not qualify | | | | | | |
| (Soviet Union) 1985 | Did not qualify | | | | | | |
| (Chile) 1987 | Did not qualify | | | | | | |
| (Saudi Arabia) 1989 | Did not qualify | | | | | | |
| (Portugal) 1991 | Did not qualify | | | | | | |
| (Australia) 1993 | Did not qualify | | | | | | |
| (Qatar) 1995 | Did not qualify | | | | | | |
| (Malaysia) 1997 | Did not qualify | | | | | | |
| (Nigeria) 1999 | Did not qualify | | | | | | |
| (Argentina) 2001 | Did not qualify | | | | | | |
| (United Arab Emirates) 2003 | Did not qualify | | | | | | |
| (Netherlands) 2005 | Did not qualify | | | | | | |
| (Canada) 2007 | Did not qualify | | | | | | |
| (Egypt) 2009 | Did not qualify | | | | | | |
| (Colombia) 2011 | Did not qualify | | | | | | |
| (Turkey) 2013 | Did not qualify | | | | | | |
| (New Zealand) 2015 | Did not qualify | | | | | | |
| (South Korea) 2017 | Did not qualify | | | | | | |
| (Poland) 2019 | Did not qualify | | | | | | |
| (Argentina) 2023 | Did not qualify | | | | | | |
| (Chile) 2025 | Did not qualify | | | | | | |
| (Azerbaijan) (Uzbekistan) 2027 | To be determined | | | | | | |
| Total | 0/25 | 0 | 0 | 0 | 0 | 0 | 0 |

^{1}Draws include knockout matches decided on penalty kicks.

== See also ==
- Lesotho national football team
- Lesotho national under-17 football team
