= Botswana national under-20 football team =

National under-20 association football team representing Botswana

Botswana U-20
- Nickname: Dipitse (The Zebras)
- Association: BFA
- Confederation: CAF (Africa)
- Sub-confederation: COSAFA (Southern Africa)
- Home stadium: Botswana National Stadium
First colours	Second colours	Third colours

U-20 Africa Cup of Nations
- Appearances: None

FIFA U-20 World Cup
- Appearances: None

The Botswana national under-20 football team, nicknamed the Zebras, represents Botswana in international youth football competitions. Its primary role is the development of players in preparation for the senior national team. The team competes in a variety of competitions, including the biennial FIFA U-20 World Cup and the U-20 Africa Cup of Nations, which is the top competitions for this age group.

== Competitive record ==
=== FIFA U-20 World Cup record ===
FIFA U-20 World Cup record
Year	Round	GP	W	D^{1}	L	GS	GA
(Tunisia) 1977	Did not qualify						
(Japan) 1979	Did not qualify						
(Australia) 1981	Did not qualify						
(Mexico) 1983	Did not qualify						
(Soviet Union) 1985	Did not qualify						
(Chile) 1987	Did not qualify						
(Saudi Arabia) 1989	Did not qualify						
(Portugal) 1991	Did not qualify						
(Australia) 1993	Did not qualify						
(Qatar) 1995	Did not qualify						
(Malaysia) 1997	Did not qualify						
(Nigeria) 1999	Did not qualify						
(Argentina) 2001	Did not qualify						
(United Arab Emirates) 2003	Did not qualify						
(Netherlands) 2005	Did not qualify						
(Canada) 2007	Did not qualify						
(Egypt) 2009	Did not qualify						
(Colombia) 2011	Did not qualify						
(Turkey) 2013	Did not qualify						
(New Zealand) 2015	Did not qualify						
(South Korea) 2017	Did not qualify						
(Poland) 2019	Did not qualify						
(Argentina) 2023	Did not qualify						
(Chile) 2025	Did not qualify						
(Azerbaijan) (Uzbekistan) 2027	To be determined						
Total	0/25	0	0	0	0	0	0

^{1}Draws include knockout matches decided on penalty kicks.

== See also ==
- Botswana national football team
- Botswana national under-17 football team
