= Zambia national under-20 football team =

National under-20 association football team representing Zambia

Zambia Under 20
- Nickname: Junior Chipolopolo (Junior Copper Bullets)
- Association: FAZ
- Confederation: CAF (Africa)
- Head coach: (Zambia) Chisi Mbewe
- Captain: Solomon Sakala
- Most caps: Isaac Chansa
- Top scorer: Rodgers Kola
- FIFA code: ZAM
First colours	Second colours

Biggest win
- Zambia 6-1 Mali (Lusaka, Zambia; 1 March 2017)

Biggest defeat
- Brazil 5-1 Zambia (Abuja, Nigeria; 11 April 1999)

U-20 Africa Cup of Nations
- Appearances: 10 (first in 1985)
- Best result: Champions (2017)

FIFA U-20 World Cup
- Appearances: 3 (first in 1999)
- Best result: Quarter final (2017)

The Zambia national under-20 football team is the U-20 football team for Zambia. They are also known as the Junior Chipolpolo as the senior side is known as Chipolopolo (Copper Bullets). They came in fourth place in the 2007 African Youth Championship, which meant they qualified for the 2007 FIFA U-20 World Cup where they were eliminated by U-20 Africa Cup of Nations 5-time winner Nigeria.

The Zambia U20 soccer team has won the COSAFA U20 Cup 2022 in eSwatini

== Current squad ==
The following players were selected for the 2025 U-20 Africa Cup of Nations to be played between 27 April – 18 May 2025.

Caps and goals correct as of 6 May 2025, following the match against Tanzania

No.	Pos.	Player	Date of birth (age)	Caps	Goals	Club
1	GK	Levison Banda	6 March 2005 (age 21)	3	0	(Football Association of Zambia) ZESCO United
18	GK	Mapalo Chitundu		0	0	(Football Association of Zambia) Kansanshi Dynamos
2	DF	Witson Banda		2	0	(Football Association of Zambia) NAPSA Stars
3	DF	Samson Ngulube		0	0	(Football Association of Zambia) Kafue Celtic
4	DF	Happy Nsiku	1 March 2005 (age 21)	5	0	(Football Association of Zambia) Red Arrows
5	DF	Charles Buyoya	2 January 2005 (age 21)	3	0	(Football Association of Zambia) Kafue Celtic
12	DF	David Hamansenya	24 June 2007 (age 19)	3	0	(Royal Spanish Football Federation) Leganés
14	DF	Milimo Keith Nalumango	3 September 2007 (age 19)	1	0	(German Football Association) Bad Aibling
16	DF	Mathews Banda	6 August 2005 (age 21)	2	0	(Football Association of Zambia) Nkana
26	DF	Danny Bwalya		0	0	(Football Association of Zambia) Nchanga Rangers
6	MF	David Simukonda	10 August 2005 (age 21)	3	0	(Football Association of Zambia) ZESCO United
8	MF	Elvis Mulenga	1 April 2007 (age 19)	1	0	(Football Association of Zambia) Kafue Celtic
10	MF	Perkins Mumba Mwale	23 November 2005 (age 20)	2	0	(Football Association of Zambia) Green Buffaloes
13	MF	Mbemba Kawangu	17 June 2006 (age 20)	3	0	(Royal Spanish Football Federation) Cádiz
20	MF	Emmanuel Mutale	12 April 2006 (age 20)	3	0	(Football Association of Zambia) Nkana
21	MF	Frank Chileshe	10 June 2005 (age 21)	2	0	(Georgian Football Federation) Locomotive Tbilisi
23	MF	Obvious Summerton Mwaliteta	15 May 2006 (age 20)	0	0	Unknown
7	FW	Pascal Phiri		3	0	(Football Association of Zambia) ZESCO United
9	FW	Andrew Mulenga	5 November 2005 (age 20)	1	0	(Brazilian Football Confederation) Porto Vitória
11	FW	Joseph Sabobo	17 December 2005 (age 20)	3	1	(Swiss Football Association) Zürich
17	FW	Bonephanseo Phiri	16 June 2005 (age 21)	2	0	(Georgian Football Federation) Locomotive Tbilisi
24	FW	Eliya Mandanji		3	0	(Football Association of Zambia) Kafue Celtic
25	MF	Philimon Chilimina		3	0	(Football Association of Zambia) Green Buffaloes

== Competitive record ==
=== FIFA U-20 World Cup ===
Champions Runners-up Third Place Fourth Place

FIFA U-20 World Cup record
Year	Round	GP	W	D^{1}	L	GS	GA
(Tunisia) 1977	Did not qualify						
(Japan) 1979	Did not qualify						
(Australia) 1981	Did not qualify						
(Mexico) 1983	Did not qualify						
(Soviet Union) 1985	Did not qualify						
(Chile) 1987	Did not qualify						
(Saudi Arabia) 1989	Did not qualify						
(Portugal) 1991	Did not qualify						
(Australia) 1993	Did not qualify						
(Qatar) 1995	Did not qualify						
(Malaysia) 1997	Did not qualify						
(Nigeria) 1999	Group stage	3	1	1	1	5	8
(Argentina) 2001	Did not qualify						
(United Arab Emirates) 2003	Did not qualify						
(Netherlands) 2005	Did not qualify						
(Canada) 2007	Round of 16	4	1	1	2	5	5
(Egypt) 2009	Did not qualify						
(Colombia) 2011	Did not qualify						
(Turkey) 2013	Did not qualify						
(New Zealand) 2015	Did not qualify						
(South Korea) 2017	Quarter-finals	5	3	0	2	12	10
(Poland) 2019	Did not qualify						
(Argentina) 2023	Did not qualify						
(Chile) 2025	Did not qualify						
(Azerbaijan) (Uzbekistan) 2027	Did not qualify						
(Armenia) (Georgia (country)) 2029	To be determined						
Total	3/26	12	5	2	5	22	23

== Class of 2007 ==
- Rainford Kalaba
- Nyambe Mulenga
- Rogers Kola
- Aggripa Simpemba
- Jacob Banda
- Fwayo Tembo
- Joseph Zimba
- Clifford Mulenga
