= South Africa national soccer team results (2020–present) =

This article provides details of international football games played by the South Africa national soccer team from 2020 to present.

== Results ==
Win Draw Loss Cancelled

=== 2020 ===
8 October 2020 Friendly	South Africa	1–1	Namibia	Phokeng, South Africa
18:00 UTC+2	Singh 18'	Report	Iimbondi 55'	Stadium: Royal Bafokeng Stadium; Referee: Norman Matemera (Zimbabwe)

11 October 2020 Friendly	South Africa	1–2	Zambia	Phokeng, South Africa
15:00 UTC+2	Dolly 66'	Report	Kampamba 78'; Zulu 82'	Stadium: Royal Bafokeng Stadium; Referee: Thulani Sibandze (Eswatini)

13 November 2020 2021 AFCONQ	South Africa	2–0	São Tomé and Príncipe	Johannesburg, South Africa
21:00 UTC+2	Tau 55' (pen.); Zungu 90+1'	Report		Stadium: Soccer City; Referee: Thulani Sibandze (Eswatini)

16 November 2020 2021 AFCONQ	São Tomé and Príncipe	2–4	South Africa	Port Elizabeth, South Africa
15:00 UTC+2	Jocy 12'; Harramiz 75'	Report	Zwane 39', 87'; Tau 70', 88'	Stadium: Nelson Mandela Bay Stadium (Note: Due to the COVID-19 pandemic, the São Toméan Football Federation agreed to play their home match against South Africa in Port Elizabeth.); Referee: Tawel Camara Younoussa (Guinea)

=== 2021 ===
25 March 2021 2021 AFCONQ	South Africa	1–1	Ghana	Johannesburg, South Africa
18:00 UTC+2	Tau 51'	Report	Kudus 49'	Stadium: FNB Stadium; Referee: Bamlak Tessema Weyesa (Ethiopia)

28 March 2021 2021 AFCONQ	Sudan	2–0	South Africa	Omdurman, Sudan
18:00 UTC+2	Bakhit 5'; Abdel Rahman 32'	Report		Stadium: Al-Hilal Stadium; Referee: Helder Martins de Carvalho (Angola)

10 June 2021 Friendly	South Africa	3–2	Uganda	Johannesburg, South Africa
18:00 UTC+2	Makgopa 62', 83'; Hlongwane 67'	Report	Orit 17'; Abdu 89'	Stadium: Orlando Stadium; Referee: Audrick Nkole (Zambia)

3 September 2021 2022 World Cup qualification	Zimbabwe	0–0	South Africa	Harare, Zimbabwe
15:00 UTC+2		Report		Stadium: National Sports Stadium; Referee: Mahmoud El Banna (Egypt)

6 September 2021 2022 World Cup qualification	South Africa	1–0	Ghana	Johannesburg, South Africa
18:00 UTC+2	Hlongwane 83'	Report		Stadium: FNB Stadium; Referee: Derrick Kasokota Kafuli (Zambia)

9 October 2021 2022 World Cup qualification	Ethiopia	1–3	South Africa	Bahir Dar, Ethiopia
16:00 UTC+3	Kebede 67'	Report	Mokoena 45+1'; Mvala 71'; Makgopa 90+1'	Stadium: Bahir Dar Stadium; Attendance: 0 Referee: Shuhoub Abdulbasit (Libya)

12 October 2021 2022 World Cup qualification	South Africa	1–0	Ethiopia	Johannesburg, South Africa
18:00 UTC+2	Kebede 11' (o.g.)	Report		Stadium: FNB Stadium; Referee: Georges Gatogato (Burundi)

11 November 2021 2022 World Cup qualification	South Africa	1–0	Zimbabwe	Johannesburg, South Africa
21:00 UTC+2	Mokoena 26'	Report		Stadium: FNB Stadium; Referee: Sadok Selmi (Tunisia)

14 November 2021 2022 World Cup qualification	Ghana	1–0	South Africa	Cape Coast, Ghana
21:00 UTC+0	A. Ayew 33' (pen.)	Report		Stadium: Cape Coast Sports Stadium; Referee: Maguette N'Diaye (Senegal)

=== 2022 ===
25 March 2022 Friendly	South Africa	0–0	Guinea	Kortrijk, Belgium
18:00 UTC+1		Report		Stadium: Guldensporen Stadion; Referee: Allard Lindhout (Netherlands)

29 March 2022 Friendly	France	5–0	South Africa	Villeneuve d'Ascq, France
21:15 UTC+2	Mbappé 23', 76' (pen.); Giroud 34'; Ben Yedder 81'; Guendouzi 90+2'	Report		Stadium: Stade Pierre-Mauroy; Referee: Sandro Schärer (Switzerland)

9 June 2022 2023 AFCON Q	Morocco	2–1	South Africa	Rabat, Morocco
20:00 UTC+1	En-Nesyri 51'; El Kaabi 88'	Report	Foster 8'	Stadium: Stade Moulay Abdellah; Referee: Sadok Selmi (Tunisia)

13 June 2022 2023 AFCON Q	South Africa	Cancelled	Zimbabwe	Johannesburg, South Africa
				Stadium: FNB Stadium

22 July 2022 2022 CHAN qualification	Comoros	0–1	South Africa	Saint Pierre, Mauritius
			Shezi 74'	Stadium: Complexe Sportif de Côte d'Or

30 July 2022 2022 CHAN qualification	South Africa	0–0	Comoros	Soweto, South Africa
				Stadium: Dobsonville Stadium

28 August 2022 2022 CHAN qualification	Angola	2–0	South Africa	Luanda, Angola
	Danielson 13'; Teixiera 68'			Stadium: Estádio 11 de Novembro

4 September 2022 2022 CHAN qualification	South Africa	1–4	Angola	Soweto, South Africa
	Nxumalo 5'		Lebusa 39' (o.g.); Gilberto 67'; Jó Paciência 72'; Danilson 78'	Stadium: Dobsonville Stadium

24 September 2022 Friendly	South Africa	4–0	Sierra Leone	Johannesburg, South Africa
15:00 UTC+2	Zwane 33', 64'; Mayambela 49'; Modiba 72'	Report		Stadium: FNB Stadium; Referee: Janny Sikazwe (Zambia)

27 September 2022 Friendly	South Africa	1–0	Botswana	Johannesburg, South Africa
18:00 UTC+2	Mokoena 38'	Report		Stadium: FNB Stadium; Referee: Thulani Sibandze (Eswatini)

17 November 2022 Friendly	South Africa	2–1	Mozambique	Nelspruit, South Africa
20:30 UTC+2	Hlongwane 56', 59'	Report	Divrassone 13'	Stadium: Mbombela Stadium; Referee: Lebalang Mokete (Lesotho)

20 November 2022 Friendly	South Africa	1–1	Angola	Nelspruit, South Africa
18:00 UTC+2	Lepasa 28' (pen.)	Report	Zini 20'	Stadium: Mbombela Stadium; Referee: Joshua Bondo (Botswana)

=== 2023 ===
24 March 2023 2023 AFCON qualification	South Africa	2–2	Liberia	Johannesburg, South Africa
18:00 UTC+2	Foster 11' (pen.), 22'	Report	Tisdell 68'; Sangare 90+1'	Stadium: Orlando Stadium; Referee: Bamlak Tessema Weyesa (Ethiopia)

28 March 2023 2023 AFCON qualification	Liberia	1–2	South Africa	Monrovia, Liberia
16:00 UTC+0	Jebor 35'	Report	Lepasa 19'; Mayambela 53'	Stadium: Samuel Kanyon Doe Sports Complex; Referee: Daniel Nii Laryea (Ghana)

17 June 2023 2023 AFCON qualification	South Africa	2–1	Morocco	Johannesburg, South Africa
17:00 UTC+2	Mohamedi 5' (o.g.); Lepasa 48'	Report	Ziyech 60'	Stadium: FNB Stadium; Referee: Alhadi Allaou Mahamat (Chad)

5 July 2023 2023 COSAFA Cup GS	South Africa	1–1	Namibia	Durban, South Africa
17:00 UTC+2	Human 48'	Report	Kambindu 43'	Stadium: King Zwelithini Stadium; Referee: Retselisitsoe Molise (Lesotho)

8 July 2023 2023 COSAFA Cup GS	South Africa	2–1	Botswana	Durban, South Africa
17:00 UTC+2	Rayners 66' (pen.); Mogaila 67'	Report	Kgamanyane 63'; Kopelang (red card) 64'	Stadium: King Zwelithini Stadium; Referee: Patrice Milazare (Mauritius)

11 July 2023 2023 COSAFA Cup GS	South Africa	2–1	Eswatini	Durban, South Africa
17:00 UTC+2	Mabasa 76', 88'	Report	Bongwa Matsebula 51'	Stadium: Princess Magogo Stadium; Referee: Retselisitsoe Molise (Lesotho)

14 July 2023 2023 COSAFA Cup Semi-final	South Africa	1–2	Zambia	Durban, South Africa
17:00 UTC+2	Mabasa 44'	Report	Mashata 50'; Kangwanda 69'	Stadium: Princess Magogo Stadium; Referee: Keabetswe Dintwa (Botswana)

16 July 2023 2023 COSAFA Cup Third-place	Mozambique	0–0 (3–5 p)	South Africa	Durban, South Africa
17:00 UTC+2		Report		Stadium: King Zwelithini Stadium; Referee: Retselisitsoe Molise (Lesotho)
	Penalties
	Kaonga (penalty scored); Chaziya (penalty scored); Aaron (penalty scored); Kumwembe (penalty missed)		(penalty scored) Lakay; (penalty scored) Mogaila; (penalty scored) Rayners; (penalty scored) Mabasa; (penalty scored) Human

9 September 2023 Friendly	South Africa	0–0	Namibia	Johannesburg, South Africa
17:00 UTC+2		Report		Stadium: Orlando Stadium; Referee: Godfrey Nkhakananga (Malwai)

12 September 2023 Friendly	South Africa	1–0	DR Congo	Johannesburg, South Africa
17:00 UTC+2	Foster 25'	Report		Stadium: Orlando Stadium; Referee: Godfrey Nkhakananga (Malwai)

13 October 2023 Friendly	South Africa	0–0	Eswatini	Soweto, South Africa
17:00 UTC+2		Report		Stadium: FNB Stadium; Referee: Retselisitsoe Molise (Lesotho)

17 October 2023 Friendly	Ivory Coast	1–1	South Africa	Abidjan, Ivory Coast
20:00 UTC+2	Haller 66'	Report	Zwane 9'	Stadium: Stade Félix Houphouët-Boigny; Referee: Benoit Badot (Burkina Faso)

18 November 2023 2026 FIFA World Cup qualification	South Africa	2–1	Benin	Durban, South Africa
20:00 UTC+2	Tau 2'; Mudau 45+2'	Report	Mounie 70'	Stadium: Moses Mabhida Stadium; Referee: Mahmood Ismail (Sudan)

21 November 2023 2026 FIFA World Cup qualification	Rwanda	2–0	South Africa	Butare, Rwanda
20:00 UTC+2	Nshuti 12'; Mugisha 28'	Report		Stadium: Stade Huye; Referee: Amin Omar (Egypt)

=== 2024 ===
10 January 2024 Friendly	South Africa	0–0	Lesotho	Pretoria, South Africa
		Report		Stadium: Lucas Moripe Stadium

16 January 2024 2023 AFCON GS	Mali	2–0	South Africa	Korhogo, Ivory Coast
20:00 UTC+2	Traoré 60'; Sinayoko 66'	Report		Stadium: Amadou Gon Coulibaly Stadium; Referee: Mohammed Hussein (Egypt)

21 January 2024 2023 AFCON GS	South Africa	4–0	Namibia	Korhogo, Ivory Coast
20:00 UTC+2	Tau 14' (pen.); Zwane 25', 40'; Maseko 75'	Report		Stadium: Amadou Gon Coulibaly Stadium; Referee: Youcef Gamouh (Algeria)

24 January 2024 2023 AFCON GS	South Africa	0–0	Tunisia	Korhogo, Ivory Coast
17:00 UTC+2		Report		Stadium: Amadou Gon Coulibaly Stadium; Referee: Issa Sy (Senegal)

30 January 2024 2023 AFCON R16	Morocco	0–2	South Africa	San Pédro, Ivory Coast
20:00 UTC+2		Report	Makgopa 57'; Mokoena 90+5'	Stadium: Laurent Pokou Stadium; Referee: Mahmood Ismail (Sudan)

3 February 2024 2023 Africa Cup of Nations QF	Cape Verde	0–0 (a.e.t.) (1–2 p)	South Africa	Yamoussoukro, Ivory Coast
20:00		Report		Stadium: Charles Konan Banny Stadium; Referee: Jean-Jacques Ndala Ngambo (DR Congo)
	Penalties
	Bebé (penalty missed); Semedo (penalty missed); Duarte (penalty missed); Teixeira (penalty scored); Andrade (penalty missed)		Mokoena (penalty scored); Lepasa (penalty missed); Modiba (penalty missed); Mvala (penalty scored)

7 February 2024 2023 Africa Cup of Nations SF	Nigeria	1–1 (a.e.t.) (4–2 p)	South Africa	Bouaké, Ivory Coast
17:00	Troost-Ekong 67' (pen.)	Report	Mokoena 90' (pen.); Grant Kekana (red card) 115'	Stadium: Stade de la Paix; Referee: Amin Omar (Egypt)
	Penalties
	Moffi (penalty scored); Omeruo (penalty scored); Aina (penalty missed); Troost-Ekong (penalty scored); Iheanacho (penalty scored)		Mokoena (penalty missed); Mayambela (penalty scored); Makgopa (penalty missed); Mvala (penalty scored)

10 February 2024 2023 AFCON 3rd	South Africa	0–0 (6–5 p)	DR Congo	Abidjan, Ivory Coast
20:00 UTC+0		Report		Stadium: Felix Houphouet Boigny Stadium; Attendance: 21,975; Referee: Bamlak Tessema Weyesa (Ethiopia)
	Penalties
	Mokoena (penalty missed); Sibisi (penalty scored); Monare (penalty scored); Modiba (penalty scored); Lepasa (penalty scored); Appollis (penalty scored); Xulu (penalty scored)		(penalty scored) Moutoussamy; (penalty scored) Mfulu; (penalty scored) Bakambu; (penalty scored) Kayembe; (penalty missed) Mbemba; (penalty scored) Wissa; (penalty missed) Elia

21 March 2024 FIFA Series	Andorra	1–1	South Africa	Annaba, Algeria
22:00 UTC+1	R. Fernández 5'	Report	Mokwana 25'	Stadium: 19 May 1956 Stadium; Referee: Nabil Boukhalfa (Algeria)

26 March 2024 FIFA Series	Algeria	3–3	South Africa	Algiers, Algeria
22:00 UTC+1	Benzia 22', 70'; Brahimi 53'	Report	Zwane 34', 45+5'; Rayners 66'	Stadium: Nelson Mandela Stadium; Referee: Amir Loussaif (Tunisia)

7 June 2026 FIFA World Cup qualification	Nigeria	1–1	South Africa	Uyo, Nigeria
21:00 UTC+1	Dele-Bashiru 46'	Report	Zwane 29'	Stadium: Godswill Akpabio International Stadium; Referee: Alhadi Allaou Mahamat (Chad)

11 June 2026 FIFA World Cup qualification	South Africa	3–1	Zimbabwe	Bloemfontein, South Africa
18:00 UTC+2	Rayners 1'; Morena 55', 76'	Report	Chirewa 2'	Stadium: Free State Stadium; Referee: Mohamed Maarouf Eid Mansour (Egypt)

26 June 2024 COSAFA Cup	South Africa	1–1	Mozambique	Gqeberha, South Africa
18:00 UTC+2	Dortley 39'	Report	Chamito 65'	Stadium: Nelson Mandela Bay Stadium

29 June 2024 COSAFA Cup	South Africa	0–0	Botswana	Gqeberha, South Africa
15:00 UTC+2		Report		Stadium: Isaac Wolfson Stadium

2 July 2024 COSAFA Cup	South Africa	1–0	Eswatini	Gqeberha, South Africa
15:00 UTC+2	Sibanyoni 3'	Report		Stadium: Nelson Mandela Bay Stadium

6 September 2025 AFCON qualification	South Africa	2–2	Uganda	Johannesburg, South Africa
18:00 UTC+2	Lyle Foster 14'; Thalente Mbatha 90+5'	Report	Denis Omedi 51'; Rogers Mato 54'	Stadium: Orlando Stadium; Referee: Pierre Atcho (Gabon)

10 September 2025 AFCON qualification	South Sudan	2–3	South Africa	Juba, South Sudan
15:00 UTC+2	Okello 15' (pen.); Yuel 57'	Report	Appollis 17', 45+2'; Mbatha 90+5'	Stadium: Juba Stadium; Referee: Joseph Ogabor (Nigeria)

11 October 2025 AFCON qualification	South Africa	5–0	Congo	Gqeberha, South Africa
20:00 UTC+2	Mokoena 12'; Mokoena 27'; Aubaas 37'; Foster 52'; Rayners 78'	Report		Stadium: Nelson Mandela Bay Stadium; Referee: Dahane Beida (Mauritania)

14 October 2025 AFCON qualification	Congo	1–1	South Africa	Brazzaville, Congo
18:00 UTC+2	Bassouamina 45+3'	Report	Mokwana 33'	Stadium: Stade Alphonse Massemba-Débat; Referee: Mahmood Ismail (Sudan)

10 November 2025 AFCON qualification	Uganda	0–2	South Africa	Kampala, Uganda
15:00 UTC+2		Report	Morena 49'; Maswanganyi 89'	Stadium: Mandela National Stadium; Attendance: 38,000; Referee: Alhadi Allaou Mahamat (Chad)

19 November 2025 AFCON qualification	South Africa	3–0	South Sudan	Cape Town, South Africa
18:00 UTC+2	Rayners 7'; Maswanganyi 22'; Mokoena 50' (pen.)	Report		Stadium: Cape Town Stadium; Referee: Adalbert Diouf (Senegal)

=== 2025 ===
2 March CHAN qualification	South Africa	1-1	Egypt	Bloemfontein, South Africa
17:00	Webber 80'	Report	Mohamed Antar 66'	Stadium: Free State Stadium

8 March CHAN qualification	Egypt	1-3	South Africa	Ismailia, Egypt
17:00	Mohamed Shika 32'	Report	Maema 15'; Mfolozi 26'; Luthuli 50'	Stadium: Suez Canal Stadium

21 March 2026 FIFA World Cup qualification	South Africa	2–0	Lesotho	Polokwane, South Africa
18:00 UTC+2	Mofokeng 60'; Adams 64'	Report		Stadium: Peter Mokaba Stadium

25 March 2026 FIFA World Cup qualification	Benin	0–2	South Africa	Abidjan, Ivory Coast
18:00 UTC+2		Report	Foster 53'; Adams 84'	Stadium: Felix Houphouet Boigny Stadium

3 May CHAN qualification	Malawi	1–0	South Africa	Lilongwe, Malawi
15:00 UTC+2	Zeliat Nkhoma 88'	Report		Stadium: Bingu National Stadium

11 May CHAN qualification	South Africa	2–0	Malawi	Pretoria, South Africa
15:00 UTC+2	Victor Letsoalo 11'; Neo Maema 86'	Report		Stadium: Loftus Versfeld Stadium

4 June 2025 COSAFA Cup	South Africa	0–1	Mozambique	Bloemfontein, South Africa
15:00 UTC+2		Report	Sumbane 73'	Stadium: Free State Stadium; Referee: Arnaud Zafimahatoha (Madagascar)

6 June Friendly	South Africa	0–0	Tanzania	Polokwane, South Africa
19:30 UTC+2		Report		Stadium: Peter Mokaba Stadium

7 June 2025 COSAFA Cup	South Africa	2–0	Zimbabwe	Bloemfontein, South Africa
15:00 UTC+2	Dlamini 40' (pen.); Okon 78'	Report		Stadium: Dr. Petrus Molemela Stadium; Referee: Thabang Ketshabile (Botswana)

10 June 2025 COSAFA Cup	South Africa	0–0	Mauritius	Bloemfontein, South Africa
18:00 UTC+2		Report		Stadium: Free State Stadium; Referee: Celso Alvação (Mozambique)

10 June Friendly	South Africa	2–0	Mozambique	Polokwane, South Africa
19:30 UTC+2	Kwayiba 47'; Cupido 70'	Report		Stadium: Peter Mokaba Stadium

13 June 2025 COSAFA Cup	South Africa	3–1	Comoros	Bloemfontein, South Africa
18:00 UTC+2	I. Mohamed 8' (o.g.); Radiopane 14'; Sebelebele 60'	Report	Madi 29'	Stadium: Free State Stadium; Referee: Hillary Hambaba (Zambia)

15 June 2025 COSAFA Cup	Angola	3–0	South Africa	Bloemfontein, South Africa
15:00 UTC+2	Depú 43', 62'; Milson 81'	Report		Stadium: Free State Stadium; Referee: Brighton Chimene (Zimbabwe)

2026 FIFA World Cup qualification	South Africa	0–3 (Note: The South Africa v Lesotho match originally finished as a 2–0 win for South Africa. However, on 29 September 2025, the FIFA Disciplinary Committee awarded the match as a 3–0 win to Lesotho as South Africa fielded the ineligible player Teboho Mokoena. The South African Football Association were also fined CHF 10,000.)	Lesotho	Polokwane, South Africa
18:00 SAST				Stadium: Peter Mokaba stadium

2026 FIFA World Cup qualification	South Africa	1- 1	Nigeria	South Africa

2026 FIFA World Cup qualification	Zimbabwe	0 - 0	South Africa	Durban, South Africa
				Stadium: Moses Mabhida stadium

2026 World Cup qualification	South Africa	3 - 0	Rwanda	South Africa
	Mbatha Appolis Makgopa			Stadium: Mbombela stadium

15 November friendly	South Africa	3 - 1	Zambia	South Africa
				Stadium: Nelson Mandela bay stadium

16 December Friendly	South Africa	1 - 0	Ghana B	Soweto, South Africa
	Mbule 58'			Stadium: Dobsonville stadium

22 December 2025 AFCON Group B	South Africa	2–1	Angola	Marrakesh, Morocco
18:00 UTC+1	Appollis 21'; Foster 79'	Report	Show 35'	Stadium: Marrakesh Stadium; Attendance: 4,013; Referee: Mahmood Ismail (Sudan)

26 December 2025 AFCON Group B	Egypt	1–0	South Africa	Agadir, Morocco
16:00 UTC+1	Hany (yellow card) 30' (yellow-red card) 45+2'; Salah 45' (pen.)	Report		Stadium: Adrar Stadium; Attendance: 40,219; Referee: Pacifique Ndabihawenimana (Burundi)

29 December 2025 AFCON Group B	Zimbabwe	2–3	South Africa	Marrakesh, Morocco
17:00 UTC+1	Maswanhise 19'; Modiba 73' (o.g.)	Report	Moremi 7'; Foster 50'; Appollis 82' (pen.)	Stadium: Marrakesh Stadium; Attendance: 9,235; Referee: Mustapha Kech Chaf (Morocco)

=== 2026 ===
4 January 2025 AFCON Round of 16	South Africa	1–2	Cameroon	Rabat, Morocco
20:00 UTC+1	Makgopa 88'	Report	Tchamadeu 34'; Kofane 47'	Stadium: Al Medina Stadium; Attendance: 14,127; Referee: Peter Waweru (Kenya)

27 March Friendly	South Africa	1–1	Panama	Durban, South Africa
19:00 UTC+2	Appollis 48'	Report	Bárcenas 23'	Stadium: Moses Mabhida Stadium; Attendance: 14,000; Referee: Thabang Ketshabile (Botswana)

31 March Friendly	South Africa	1–2	Panama	Cape Town, South Africa
19:30 UTC+2	Mbokazi 64'	Report	Córdoba 58'; Ramos 77'	Stadium: Cape Town Stadium; Referee: Thabang Ketshabile (Botsawana)

29 May World Cup warm-up	South Africa	0–0	Nicaragua	Johannesburg, South Africa
		Report		Stadium: Orlando Stadium; Attendance: 32,000; Referee: Lebalang Mokete (Lesotho)

6 June World Cup warm-up	Jamaica	1–1	South Africa	Pachuca, Mexico
	Atkinson 90+3'	Report	Apollis 32'	Stadium: Estadio Hidalgo; Attendance: 0

11 June 2026 FIFA World Cup Group A	Mexico	2–0	South Africa	Ciudad de México, Mexico
	Quiñones 9'; Jiménez 67'	Report		Stadium: Estadio Azteca; Attendance: 80,824; Referee: Wilton Sampaio (Brazil)

18 June 2026 FIFA World Cup Group A	Czech Republic	1–1	South Africa	Atlanta, Georgia, United States
12:00 UTC−4	Sadílek 6'	Report	Mokoena 83'	Stadium: Mercedes-Benz Stadium; Attendance: 67,442; Referee: Tori Penso (United States)

26 June 2026 FIFA World Cup Group A	South Africa	1–0	South Korea	Guadalupe, Mexico
	Maseko 63'			Stadium: Estadio BBVA; Attendance: 51,243; Referee: Facundo Tello (Argentina)

28 June 2026 FIFA World Cup Round of 32	South Africa	0–1	Canada	Inglewood, California, United States
12:00 UTC−7		Report	Eustáquio 90+2'	Stadium: SoFi Stadium; Attendance: 69,237; Referee: João Pinherio (Portugal)
