= Golden Mashata =

Zambian footballer (born 2001)

Personal information
- Full name: Yamikani Golden Mashata
- Date of birth: 29 January 2001 (age 25)
- Height: 1.76 m (5 ft 9 in)
- Position: Midfielder

Team information
- Current team: Hapoel Ra'anana (on loan from Green Buffaloes)
- Number: 14

Youth career
- FORSTER
- Happy Hearts

Senior career*
Years	Team	Apps	(Gls)
2019–	Green Buffaloes		
2025–	→ Hapoel Ra'anana (loan)	2	(0)

International career^{‡}
2018–2020	Zambia U20		
2022–2023	Zambia U23		
2023–	Zambia	9	(2)
Medal record
Men's football
Representing Zambia
COSAFA Cup
Winner	2023 South Africa
COSAFA U-20 Cup
Winner	2019 Zambia
- * Club domestic league appearances and goals as of 09:05, 1 September 2025 (UTC) ‡ National team caps and goals as of 09:05, 1 September 2025 (UTC)

Yamikani Golden Mashata (born 29 January 2001) is a Zambian professional footballer who plays as a midfielder for Liga Leumit club Hapoel Ra'anana, on loan from Zambia Super League club Green Buffaloes, and the Zambia national team.

== Early life and youth career ==
Mashata grew up in Chainda, (Note: Chainda is one of several shanty towns located on the outskirts of the capital city, Lusaka.) where he began playing football at age eight with a club called FORSTER. Shortly thereafter, he joined the Happy Hearts FC under-10 squad to challenge himself and walked to his training sessions until he graduated from the under-14s. At that point, Mashata was invited by his coach to live with him to avoid his long walks to practice. He became a prolific goalscorer and even trialled with a club in Italy, which he could not join because it did not have a youth academy.

Mashata also played with Lusaka Youth Soccer Academy in tournaments such as the Gothia Cup in Sweden, the Dana Cup in Denmark, and the Paris Cup in France.

== Club career ==
Mashata signed with Zambia Super League side Green Buffaloes at the suggestion of his youth national team manager, Charles Bwale, who also served as an assistant coach for the club. He described his debut season as "sour and sweet at the same time" because he was on the first team despite not getting much playing time.

In July 2025, Mashata was loaned to Israeli club Hapoel Ra'anana of the second-tier Liga Leumit on a one-year deal with an option to buy.

== International career ==
=== Youth teams ===
Following his performances at several youth club tournaments in Europe, Mashata was called up to the Zambia national under-20 team by manager Charles Bwale for the 2018 COSAFA U-20 Cup. Zambia suffered a 1–2 defeat to Angola in the third-place play-off. Mashata earned another call-up to the Zambia U20s the following year for the 2019 COSAFA U-20 Cup. He was instrumental in helping his side win the tournament, which they concluded with a 3–0 win over South Africa in the final. Mashata was called up for a third time ahead of the 2020 COSAFA U-20 Cup. In their opening match, he scored the lone goal in a 1–0 win over Namibia and was named the man of the match. Zambia finished in fourth place after losing to Angola in the third-place playoff.

In October 2022, Mashata was called up to the national under-23 football team for the second round of 2023 U-23 Africa Cup of Nations qualification, where they faced Sierra Leone. In the away leg, he won a penalty by drawing a foul in the 88th minute, which was converted by teammate Joshua Mutale to secure a 1–1 draw. Mashata then started in the home leg a week later, which Zambia won 1–0 to advance to the final round. He earned another call-up to the Zambia U23s the following March for their third round tie against Egypt. Mashata served as team captain for the Junior Chipolopolo, though they lost 0–2 on aggregate and failed to qualify for the 2023 U-23 Africa Cup of Nations.

=== Senior team ===
In June 2023, Mashata was named to a 30-man provisional squad for the senior national team ahead of the 2023 COSAFA Cup. He made his senior international debut for Zambia during a friendly against Kuwait on 12 June 2023, coming on for Amity Shamende in the 62nd minute of a 0–3 defeat. Mashata featured in their final tuneup game the following week, a 1–3 friendly loss to the Morocco U23s. (Note: This was not considered a full international match by FIFA.) He made his COSAFA Cup debut in Zambia's opening match, a 0–1 defeat to Malawi. In their next match, Mashata supplied the game-winning assist to Albert Kangwanda in a 2–1 win over the Comoros. He followed this up by scoring a goal and delivering an assist to Fredrick Mulambia in a 4–2 win over Seychelles. Mashata scored again in the semifinals, netting his side's first goal to spark a 2–1 comeback win over South Africa. He started in the final, helping Zambia defeat Lesotho 1–0 to claim their record seventh COSAFA Cup title.

In December 2023, Mashata was included in a 55-man provisional squad ahead of the 2023 Africa Cup of Nations. However, he was not selected to the final squad. In March 2024, Mashata was called up for the 2024 Four Nations Football Tournament held in Malawi. He played in both of Zambia's matches as they finished in third place.

In December 2024, Mashata was named to a 33-man provisional squad for a pair of 2024 African Nations Championship qualifying matches against Mozambique. Following the first week of training camp, he was named to a trimmed 28-man squad by manager Wedson Nyirenda. However, Zambia automatically qualified for the final tournament after Mozambique withdrew from the qualifiers due to post-election violence. In January 2025, Mashata was named to a 30-man provisional squad for the African Nations Championship. However, the tournament was then postponed.

In May 2025, Mashata was named to a 35-man Zambian provisional squad ahead of the 2025 COSAFA Cup. He appeared in one match against Botswana as Zambia suffered a group stage exit.

== Player profile ==
Mashata is employed as a winger or midfielder, though he can also play as a defender, such as during 2023 U-23 Africa Cup of Nations qualifiers. He has been described as "pacey and tricky", as well as a "wing wizard".

== Personal life ==
Mashata, who is religious, takes inspiration from his mother, who he said "has fought numerous battles in her life".

== Career statistics ==
=== International ===
As of match played 30 August 2025

Appearances and goals by national team and year
National team	Year	Apps	Goals
Zambia
Zambia	2023	6	2
Zambia	2024	2	0
Zambia	2025	1	0
Total		9	2

Scores and results list Zambia's goal tally first, score column indicates score after each Mashata goal.

List of international goals scored by Golden Mashata
No.	Date	Venue	Opponent	Score	Result	Competition	Ref.
1	11 July 2023	Princess Magogo Stadium, KwaMashu, South Africa	Seychelles	3–0	4–2	2023 COSAFA Cup	
2	14 July 2023	King Zwelithini Stadium, Umlazi, South Africa	South Africa	1–1	2–1	2023 COSAFA Cup	

== Honours ==
Zambia U20

- COSAFA U-20 Cup: 2019

Zambia

- COSAFA Cup: 2023
