= Lincoln Vyver =

South African soccer player

Personal information
- Full name: Lincoln Liano Vyver
- Date of birth: 2 March 2001 (age 25)
- Place of birth: South Africa
- Position: Goalkeeper

Team information
- Current team: Cape Town Spurs
- Number: 16

Youth career
- Cape Town Spurs

Senior career*
Years	Team	Apps	(Gls)
2021–	Cape Town Spurs	55	(0)

International career^{‡}
2021–	South Africa	5	(0)
- * Club domestic league appearances and goals as of 8 July 2023 ‡ National team caps and goals as of 8 July 2023

Lincoln Vyver (born 2 March 2001) is a South African professional soccer player who plays as a goalkeeper for Cape Town Spurs and the South Africa national team.

== International career ==
He made his debut for South Africa national soccer team on 14 July 2021 in a 2021 COSAFA Cup game against Zambia. South Africa won the tournament. He was again present at the 2022 COSAFA Cup.

He was named in the preliminary South Africa squad for the 2023 COSAFA Cup.
