= Albert Kangwanda =

Zambian footballer (born 1999)

Personal information
- Date of birth: 7 April 1999 (age 27)
- Place of birth: Luanshya, Zambia
- Height: 1.75 m (5 ft 9 in)
- Position: Forward

Team information
- Current team: Red Arrows F.C.
- Number: 11

Senior career*
Years	Team	Apps	(Gls)
2017–2018	Red Arrows		
2019–2020	Kafue Celtic		
2020–2021	Zanaco		
2021–2022	Kafue Celtic		
2022–2023	Gorica	0	(0)
2022	→ Hrvatski Dragovoljac (loan)	4	(0)
2023	Red Arrows		
2023–2025	Al-Hilal Omdurman		
2024	→ Red Arrows (loan)		(5)
2024–2025	→ Spartanii Sportul (loan)	8	(0)
2025-	Red Arrows F.C.		

International career^{‡}
- Zambia U20
2020–	Zambia	19	(6)
- * Club domestic league appearances and goals as of 13 August 2025 ‡ National team caps and goals as of 29 September 2026

Albert Kangwanda Jr (born 7 April 1999) is a Zambian footballer who plays as a forward for Moldovan Super Liga club Spartanii Sportul, on loan from Al-Hilal Omdurman.

== Club career ==
He started his career in Young Nkwazi. Following a stint in the Zambian Super League with Red Arrows in 2017 and 2018, he moved down to the second tier with Kafue Celtic.

In the summer of 2022, Kangwanda signed for Croatia's HNK Gorica. He was loaned out to NK Hrvatski Dragovoljac in Croatia's second tier, playing 4 games, but chose to return to Zambia and Red Arrows in early 2023. Said Kangwanda; "I was so far away from home; it was very difficult to adapt, and then you are back, your family is close, and your friends are close; it’s always motivating".

In the summer of 2023 he went on to Libyan club Al-Hilal Omdurman. In the spring of 2024 he re-signed with Red Arrows, this time on loan.

== International career ==
Internationally, Kangwanda represented Zambia U20 in the 2018 COSAFA U-20 Cup and the 2019 U-20 Africa Cup of Nations qualification. Following a failed attempt at the 2022 African Nations Championship qualification, Kangwanda won the 2022 COSAFA Cup with Zambia, and was described as a hero after his performance in the final. He scored three goals at the 2023 COSAFA Cup, helping Zambia win back-to-back titles, whilst also becoming joint top goalscorer of the tournament.

== Career statistics ==
=== International ===
As of match played 29 September 2026

Appearances and goals by national team and year
National team	Year	Apps	Goals
Zambia	2020	2	2
Zambia	2022	5	0
Zambia	2023	5	3
Zambia	2024	3	0
Zambia	2025	1	0
Zambia	2026	3	1
Total		19	6

Scores and results list Zambia's goal tally first, score column indicates score after each Kangwanda goal.

List of international goals scored by Albert Kangwanda
No.	Date	Venue	Opponent	Score	Result	Competition	Ref.
1	22 October 2020	Addis Ababa Stadium, Addis Ababa, Ethiopia	Ethiopia	2–2	3–2	Friendly	
2	22 October 2020	Addis Ababa Stadium, Addis Ababa, Ethiopia	Ethiopia	3–2	3–2	Friendly	
3	9 July 2023	King Zwelithini Stadium, Umlazi, South Africa	Comoros	2–1	2–1	2023 COSAFA Cup	
4	11 July 2023	Princess Magogo Stadium, KwaMashu, South Africa	Seychelles	1–0	4–2	2023 COSAFA Cup	
5	14 July 2023	King Zwelithini Stadium, Umlazi, South Africa	South Africa	2–1	2–1	2023 COSAFA Cup	
6	29 September 2026	Levy Mwanawasa Stadium, Ndola, Zambia	Togo	1–0	2–0	2027 Africa Cup of Nations qualification	
