= 2022 COSAFA Cup =

21st edition of the COSAFA Cup

Tournament details
- Host country: South Africa
- City: Durban
- Dates: 5 – 17 July 2022
- Teams: 14 (from 1 confederation)
- Venue: 4 (in 1 host city)

Final positions
- Champions: Zambia (6th title)
- Runners-up: Namibia
- Third place: Senegal
- Fourth place: Mozambique

Tournament statistics
- Matches played: 23
- Goals scored: 53 (2.3 per match)
- Top scorer: (Eswatini) Sabelo Ndzinisa (3 goals)
- Best player: (Zambia) Kelvin Kampamba
- Best goalkeeper: (Namibia) Edward Maova

The 2022 COSAFA Cup was the 21st edition of the annual association football competition organized by COSAFA. It was held in South Africa for the 5th consecutive season, this time in Durban, from 5 to 17 July 2022.

South Africa was the defending champion, having defeated Senegal, 5–4 in a penalty shoot out in the previous edition's final on 17 July 2021.

== Participating nations ==
National team	FIFA Ranking (31 March 2022)	Best Performance
Eswatini	143	Semi-finals (1999, 2002, 2003, 2021)
Madagascar	102	Third Place (2015)
Mauritius	179	Quarter-finals (2001, 2004)
Comoros	128	Group stage
Lesotho	145	Runner-Up (2000)
Senegal (Invited guest)	20	Runner-Up (2021)
Botswana	148	Runner-Up (2016, 2019)
Malawi	120	Runner-Up (2002, 2003)
Zambia	87	Champions (1997, 1998, 2006, 2013, 2019)
Mozambique	119	Runner-Up (2008, 2015)
Namibia	112	Champions (2015)
South Africa	69	Champions (2002, 2007, 2008, 2016, 2021)
Angola	126	Champions (1999, 2001, 2004)
Seychelles	196	Group stage

== Venues ==
2022 COSAFA Cup is located in South Africa
2022 COSAFA Cup is located in South Africa	Umlazi	KwaMashu
2022 COSAFA Cup is located in South Africa	King Zwelithini Stadium	Princess Magogo Stadium
2022 COSAFA Cup is located in South Africa	Capacity: 10,000	Capacity: 12,000

== Draw ==
The draw for the group stage 2022 COSAFA Cup was held on 14 June 2022 in the host city Durban.

== Group stage ==
=== Group A ===
Pos	Team	Pld	W	D	L	GF	GA	GD	Pts	Qualification
1	Botswana	3	3	0	0	3	0	+3	9	Advance to knockout stage
2	Angola	3	2	0	1	6	2	+4	6	
3	Comoros	3	1	0	2	3	5	−2	3	
4	Seychelles	3	0	0	3	1	6	−5	0	

Source: COSAFA
Rules for classification: Group stage tiebreakers
5 July 2022

Seychelles	0–1	Botswana
	Report	Thato Kebue 49'

King Zwelithini Stadium, Durban
5 July 2022

Angola	3–1	Comoros
Pedro P.M. Megue 39'; Lépua 49' (pen.); Higino 75'	Report	Ali N. M'Changama 76'

King Zwelithini Stadium, Durban
7 July 2022

Comoros	0–1	Botswana
	Report	B. Talane 40'

King Zwelithini Stadium, Durban
7 July 2022

Angola	3–0	Seychelles
Julinho 14'; P.P.M. Megue 78' (pen.); V.T. Zéu 90'	Report

King Zwelithini Stadium, Durban
10 July 2022

Seychelles	1–2	Comoros
Henriette 34'	Report	A. Said Sadad 9'; Ali Moudhoiffar 80'

Princess Magogo Stadium, KwaMashu
10 July 2022

Botswana	1–0	Angola
Phoko 69' (pen.)	Report

King Zwelithini Stadium, Durban

=== Group B ===
Pos	Team	Pld	W	D	L	GF	GA	GD	Pts	Qualification
1	Eswatini	3	2	1	0	6	1	+5	7	Advance to knockout stage
2	Lesotho	3	2	0	1	4	4	0	6	
3	Malawi	3	1	1	1	4	3	+1	4	
4	Mauritius	3	0	0	3	1	7	−6	0	

Source: COSAFA
Rules for classification: Group stage tiebreakers
6 July 2022

Mauritius	0–3	Eswatini
	Report	Lindo Mkhonta 9' (pen.); Mamba 77'; Ndzinisa 85'

King Zwelithini Stadium, Durban
6 July 2022

Lesotho	2–1	Malawi
S. Mkandawire 14' (o.g.); Makateng 56'	Report	Msowoya 88'

King Zwelithini Stadium, Durban
8 July 2022

Malawi	1–1	Eswatini
Khuda Myaba 46'	Report	Ndzinisa 90+2' (pen.)

King Zwelithini Stadium, Durban
8 July 2022

Lesotho	2–1	Mauritius
Tumelo Makha 10'; Thabantso 72'	Report	J. Prosper 50'

King Zwelithini Stadium, Durban
10 July 2022

Mauritius	0–2	Malawi
	Report	Sanudi 54'; Miciam Mhone 86'

Princess Magogo Stadium, KwaMashu
10 July 2022

Eswatini	2–0	Lesotho
S. Gamedze 14'; Ndzinisa 19'	Report

King Zwelithini Stadium, Durban

== Knockout stage ==
Quarter-finals
Madagascar	0
Namibia	2
South Africa	0 (4)
Mozambique (p)	0 (5)
Zambia (p)	1 (5)
Botswana	1 (4)
Senegal (p)	1 (10)
Eswatini	1 (9)

Semi-finals
Namibia	1
Mozambique	0
Zambia	4
Senegal	3

Final
Namibia	0
Zambia (a.e.t.)	1
Third place play-off
Mozambique	1 (2)
Senegal (p)	1 (4)

=== Quarter-finals ===
12 July 2022

Madagascar	0–2	Namibia
	Report	Limbondi 52' (pen.); Rudath 66'

Princess Magogo Stadium, KwaMashu
12 July 2022

Zambia	1–1	Botswana
T. Kopelang 9' (o.g.)	Report	B. Mangolo 52'
Penalties
Ricky Banda (penalty scored); Kapumbu (penalty scored); Luka Chamanga (penalty scored); Phiri (penalty scored); Chanda (penalty scored)	5–4	(penalty scored) Thato Kabue; (penalty scored) B. Talane; (penalty missed) Kitso Mangolo; (penalty scored) G. Tauyatswala; (penalty scored) Ditsele

Princess Magogo Stadium, KwaMashu
13 July 2022

South Africa	0–0	Mozambique
	Report
Penalties
Rasebotja (penalty scored); A. Van Wyk (penalty missed); Human (penalty missed); Mcaba (penalty scored); Johannes (penalty scored); Mdunyelwa (penalty scored); Msani (penalty missed)	4–5	(penalty scored) Edmilson Dove; (penalty scored) Nené; (penalty missed) Telinho; (penalty missed) Infren Matola; (penalty scored) Danilo Muze; (penalty scored) S. Nangy; (penalty scored) Lau King

Princess Magogo Stadium, KwaMashu
13 July 2022

Senegal	1–1	Eswatini
L. Camara 8'	Report	Philani Mkhontfo 60'
Penalties
Penalty scored	10–9	Penalty scored Penalty missed

Princess Magogo Stadium, KwaMashu

=== Plate Semi-finals ===
15 July 2022

Madagascar	1–2	South Africa
K. Razafidranaivo	Report	Sifama 23'; C. Butsaka 85'

Sugar Ray Xulu Stadium
15 July 2022

Botswana	2–0	Eswatini
Bame Morwalela 41'; R. Thatanyane 87'	Report

Sugar Ray Xulu Stadium

=== Semi-finals ===
15 July 2022

Namibia	1–0	Mozambique
Muzeu 6'	Report

Moses Mabhida Stadium, Durban
15 July 2022

Zambia	4–3	Senegal
Kampamba 18', 61'; Sautu 36'; Ricky Banda 58'	Report	L. Camara 22'; Jean Diouf 72'; N'Diaye 88'

Moses Mabhida Stadium, Durban

=== Plate Final ===
17 July 2022

South Africa	2–1	Botswana
van Wyk 34'; Rasebotja 80'	Report	Thato Kebue 90+3'

Sugar Ray Xulu Stadium

=== Third place play-off ===
17 July 2022

Mozambique	1–1 (a.e.t.)	Senegal
Lau King 90+3'	Report	Jean Diouf 78' (pen.)
Penalties
	2–4

Moses Mabhida Stadium

=== Final ===
17 July 2022

Namibia	0–1 (a.e.t.)	Zambia
	Report	Maova 111' (o.g.)

Moses Mabhida Stadium

== Statistics ==
=== Goalscorers ===
There were 53 goals scored in 23 matches, for an average of 2.3 goals per match.

3 goals

- (Eswatini) Sabelo Ndzinisa

2 goals

- (Angola) Pedro Pessoa Miguel Megue
- (Botswana) Thato Kebue
- (Senegal) Lamine Camara
- (Senegal) Jean Diouf
- (Zambia) Kelvin Kampamba

1 goal

- (Angola) Ezequiel Paulo Julião / Higino
- (Angola) João Gabriel Miguel Diogo João / Julinho
- (Angola) Lépua
- (Angola) Vanilson Tita Zéu
- (Botswana) Benson Mangolo
- (Botswana) Bame Morwalela
- (Botswana) Goitseone Phoko
- (Botswana) Baokeditswe Talane
- (Botswana) Resaobaka Thatanyane
- (Comoros) Ali Nassim M'Changama
- (Comoros) Ali Moudhoiffar
- (Comoros) Abdullah Said Sadad
- (Eswatini) Sandile Gamedze
- (Eswatini) Fanelo Mamba
- (Eswatini) Lindo Mkhonta
- (Eswatini) Philani Mkhontfo
- (Lesotho) Katleho Makateng
- (Lesotho) Tumelo Makha
- (Lesotho) Jane Thabantso
- (Madagascar) Koloina Razafidranaivo
- (Malawi) Miciam Mhone
- (Malawi) Chiukepo Msowoya
- (Malawi) Khuda Myaba
- (Malawi) Stanley Sadudi
- (Mauritius) Jacques Prosper
- (Mozambique) Lau King
- (Namibia) Absalom Iimbondi
- (Namibia) Bethuel Muzeu
- (Namibia) Wendell Rudath
- (Senegal) Moussa Ndiaye
- (Seychelles) Ryan Henriette
- (South Africa) Chumani Butsaka
- (South Africa) Selaelo Rasebotja
- (South Africa) Keletso Sifama
- (South Africa) Antonio Van Wyk
- (Zambia) Ricky Banda
- (Zambia) Spencer Sautu

1 own goal

- (Botswana) Tebogo Kopelang (against Zambia)
- (Malawi) Sankhani Mkandawire (against Lesotho)
- (Namibia) Edward Maova (against Zambia)
