= Kimiss Zavala =

Mozambican footballer

Personal information
- Full name: Kimiss Rabelina Zavala
- Date of birth: May 8, 2004 (age 22)
- Place of birth: Maputo, Mozambique
- Height: 1.86 m (6 ft 1 in)
- Position: Goalkeeper

Team information
- Current team: Marítimo
- Number: 34

Youth career
- Black Bulls

Senior career*
Years	Team	Apps	(Gls)
2021–2022	Black Bulls		
2022–	Marítimo B	5	(0)
2024	→ C.D.C. Montalegre (loan)	7	(0)
2025–	Marítimo	1	(0)

International career^{‡}
2020–2023	Mozambique U20	8	(0)
2025–	Mozambique	2	(0)
- * Club domestic league appearances and goals as of 02:53, 15 August 2026 (UTC) ‡ National team caps and goals as of 02:53, 15 August 2026 (UTC)

Kimiss Rabelina Zavala (born 8 May 2004) is a Mozambican footballer who plays as a goalkeeper for Primeira Liga club Marítimo and the Mozambique national team.

== Club career ==
A youth product of the Mozambican club Associação Black Bulls, he helped them win their first ever title - the 2021 Moçambola. He moved to the Portuguese club Marítimo B on 27 August 2022. On 16 January 2024, he joined C.D.C. Montalegre on loan in the Campeonato de Portugal on loan for the second half of the 2023–24 season. On 15 May 2026, he made his senior and professional debut with Marítimo as a substitute in a Chaves 3–1 win in the Liga Portugal 2, and helped the club clinch the 2025–26 Liga Portugal 2.

== International career ==
Zavala was called up to the Mozambique U20s in their winning campaign at the 2020 COSAFA U-20 Cup, where he won the golden glove award.

In August 2025, Zavala was called up to the Mozambique national team for a set of 2026 FIFA World Cup qualification matches. He made Mozambique's squad for the 2025 Africa Cup of Nations.

== Honours ==
Black Bulls

- Moçambola: 2021

Marítimo

- Liga Portugal 2: 2025–26

Zimbabwe U20

- COSAFA U-20 Youth Championship: 2020

Individual

- 2020 COSAFA U-20 Cup Golden Glove
