= Mbeba =

Mbeba is a surname. Notable people with the surname include:

- Andrew Mbeba, a Zimbabwean footballer
- Margret Mbeba, a Zambian politician

== Others ==
- Stade Mbéba, a stadium in Gabon
