= Siyabonga Mbatha =

South African soccer player

Personal information
- Date of birth: 4 February 1989 (age 37)
- Height: 1.84 m (6 ft 0 in)
- Position: Goalkeeper

Senior career*
Years	Team	Apps	(Gls)
2010–2012	Bloemfontein Celtic	1	(0)
2012–2014	African Warriors	39	(0)
2014–2015	Ubuntu Cape Town	7	(0)
2015–2017	Thanda Royal Zulu	41	(0)
2017–2021	AmaZulu	68	(0)
2021–2023	Lamontville Golden Arrows	4	(0)
- * Club domestic league appearances and goals as of 16 November 2024

Siyabonga Mbatha (born 4 February 1989) is a South African soccer player who played as a goalkeeper.

== Career ==
Mbatha made his first-tier debut in the 2010–11 South African Premier Division, when he was allowed to start the penultimate match of the season for Bloemfontein Celtic. Mbatha kept a clean sheet. Nonetheless, he did not get more chances at Bloemfontein Celtic. At Thanda Royal Zulu, Mbatha won the 2016–17 National First Division. The team would have been promoted to the 2017-18 South African Premier Division, but sold its status to AmaZulu. Mbatha followed over to AmaZulu and eventually established himself there.

Mbatha showed especially good form in 2019, keeping several clean sheets, and it caused "an uproar on social media" when he was not called up to Bafana Bafana for the 2019 Africa Cup of Nations. Despite the wishes and suggestions of some, Mbatha was not called up in 2020 either.

In the summer of 2020, AmaZulu exercised an option to extended the contract with Mbatha for another year. In the fall of 2020, Mbatha was injured during a match and substituted for Neil Boshoff, with the club also signing Veli Mothwa. Mbatha stated that he welcomed the competition with Mothwa. However, Mothwa edged out Mbatha to become their starting goalkeeper. By the end of the 2020–21 season, Mbatha left AmaZulu and signed for Lamontville Golden Arrows.

Having played one league match in 2021 (for AmaZulu) and none in 2022, Mbatha returned in February 2023 to make his debut for the Golden Arrows. It happened in the cup, and he also played a handful of league games. Following his very limited playing time, Mbatha was released in the summer of 2023. There were several different rumours about him joining another Premier Division club.

== Post-playing career ==
He hails from Umlazi near Durban. In 2018, he established the Siyabonga Qhamukile Foundation, named after his paternal grandmother Qhamukile.

Already while playing for the Golden Arrows, Mbatha completed a course at the Gordon Institute of Business Science to earn a "certificate in business studies". It became possible through the PSL Player Transition Programme.

In 2024 he appeared in the TV series Uzalo on SABC 1, playing a member of the team coached by Siyabonga Nomvethe.
