= Fanelo Mamba =

Liswati footballer (born 2001)

Personal information
- Full name: Fanelo Order Mamba
- Date of birth: 29 October 2001 (age 25)
- Position: Forward

Team information
- Current team: Harini
- Number: 67

Youth career
- Moneni Pirates

Senior career*
Years	Team	Apps	(Gls)
2015–2018	Moneni Pirates		
2018–2022	Young Buffaloes		
2022	Harini	5	(0)

International career^{‡}
2018–	Eswatini	36	(6)
- * Club domestic league appearances and goals as of 11:44, 12 October 2019 (UTC) ‡ National team caps and goals as of 22:00, 11 July 2023 (UTC)

Fanelo Order Mamba (born 29 October 2001) is a Liswati footballer.

== Club career ==
Mamba began his senior career 2015 at Moneni Pirates and was first time in October 2015 named as Player of the Month, in the MTN Premier League. He left Moneni Pirates on 21 October 2018 to sign for League rival Young Buffaloes.

== International career ==
Mamba was first called up to the Eswatini national team in September 2018 and made his debut on 9 September 2018.

== Career statistics ==
As of matches played 11 July 2023.

National team	Year	Apps	Goals
Eswatini	2018	2	0
Eswatini	2019	10	1
Eswatini	2020	1	0
Eswatini	2021	6	1
Eswatini	2022	10	4
Eswatini	2023	7	0
Total		36	6

Scores and results list eSwanti's goal tally first.

No	Date	Venue	Opponent	Score	Result	Competition
1.	17 November 2019	Mavuso Sports Centre, Manzini, Eswatini	Senegal	1–3	1–4	2021 Africa Cup of Nations qualification
2.	6 July 2021	Nelson Mandela Bay Stadium, Port Elizabeth, South Africa	Lesotho	3–1	3–1	2021 COSAFA Cup
3.	23 March 2022	National Stadium, Dar es Salaam, Tanzania	Somalia	2–0	3–0	2023 Africa Cup of Nations qualification
4.	27 March 2022	Mbombela Stadium, Mbombela, South Africa	Somalia	2–1	2–1	2023 Africa Cup of Nations qualification
5.	6 July 2022	King Zwelithini Stadium, Durban, South Africa	Mauritius	2–0	3–0	2022 COSAFA Cup
6.	31 July 2022	Orlando Stadium, Soweto, South Africa	Botswana	2–1	2–2	2022 African Nations Championship qualification
