= Shaune Mogaila =

South African soccer player

Personal information
- Full name: Shaune Mokete Mogaila
- Date of birth: 17 June 1995 (age 31)
- Place of birth: Ga-Mashashane, South Africa
- Height: 1.80 m (5 ft 11 in)
- Position: Winger

Team information
- Current team: Sekhukhune United
- Number: 12

Senior career*
Years	Team	Apps	(Gls)
2018–2020	Highlands Park	36	(3)
2020–2021	TS Galaxy	19	(2)
2022–2024	Royal AM	51	(3)
2024–	Sekhukhune United	25	(1)

International career^{‡}
2023	South Africa	5	(1)
- * Club domestic league appearances and goals as of 4 January 2026 ‡ National team caps and goals as of 27 March 2024

Shaune Mogaila (born 17 June 1995) is a South African soccer player who plays a winger for Sekhukhune United in the Premier Soccer League.

== Career ==
Mogaila spent two seasons with Highlands Park before moving to TS Galaxy in 2020. He had the mid part of the 2020-21 season ruined by a knee injury. As he recovered, TS Galaxy hired manager Owen Da Gama, previously working with Mogaila at Highlands Park. In the winter of 2022 he was signed by Royal AM together with two other TS Galaxy players.

In the summer of 2023, a transfer to Uzbekistani FC Nasaf was reportedly discussed, as was a domestic move to SuperSport United. Mogaila was also called up for South Africa for the 2023 COSAFA Cup, where he made his international debut.

He left Royal AM in February 2024, becoming a free agent.

== Personal life ==
In October 2024, Mogaila was charged with culpable homicide, reckless and negligent driving after he was involved in a car crash in Rabie Ridge, Gauteng that killed a 9-year old-child injured the mother and their 13-year-old neighbor. The family of the deceased young girl expressed their disappointment about the justice system after Shaun was granted bail of R20 000.

== International goals ==
Scores and results list South Africa's goal tally first.

No.	Date	Venue	Opponent	Score	Result	Competition
1.	8 July 2023	King Zwelithini Stadium, Durban, South Africa	Botswana	2–1	2–1	2023 COSAFA Cup
