= Fredrick Mulambia =

Zambian footballer (born 2002)

Personal information
- Date of birth: July 10, 2002 (age 24)
- Place of birth: Kitwe, Zambia
- Height: 1.75 m (5 ft 9 in)
- Position: Central midfielder

Team information
- Current team: Power Dynamos
- Number: 26

Youth career
  - 2018: Power Dynamos

Senior career*
Years	Team	Apps	(Gls)
2018–	Power Dynamos		

International career
2022–	Zambia	6	(2)
- * Club domestic league appearances and goals

Fredrick Mulambia (born 10 July 2002) is a Zambian professional footballer who plays as a central midfielder for Power Dynamos and the Zambia national team.

== Career ==
Mulambia was a youth product of Power Dynamos and was promoted to the first team in 2018. In the 32nd matchday of the 2022–23 Zambia Super League, he scored the opening goal in his team's 2–0 victory against Forest Rangers, thus helped Power Dynamos winning the league title.

== International ==
On 12 June 2023, he made his debut with Zambia national team in a 0–3 friendly defeat against Kuwait. He then featured in the 2023 COSAFA Cup, scoring 2 goals in the campaign as Zambia won the tournament.

In January 2024, he was named in Zambia's 27-men squad for the 2023 Africa Cup of Nations.

=== International goals ===
Scores and results list Zambia's goal tally first.

No.	Date	Venue	Opponent	Score	Result	Competition
1.	9 July 2023	King Zwelithini Stadium, Umlazi, South Africa	Comoros	1–0	2–1	2023 COSAFA Cup
2.	11 July 2023	Princess Magogo Stadium, Durban, South Africa	Seychelles	4–0	4–2	2023 COSAFA Cup

== Honours ==
=== Club ===
Power Dynamos

- Zambia Super League: 2022–23

=== International ===
Zambia

- COSAFA Cup: 2023
