= Neil Boshoff =

South African soccer player

Personal information
- Full name: Neil Matthew Boshoff
- Date of birth: 22 January 1996 (age 30)
- Place of birth: Pinetown, South Africa
- Position: Goalkeeper

Team information
- Current team: Cape Town Spurs
- Number: 43

Youth career
- Westville Boys High School
- Westville United Football Academy
- Sharks Academy
- AmaZulu

Senior career*
Years	Team	Apps	(Gls)
2016–2022	AmaZulu	15	(0)
2022–2023	Richards Bay	2	(0)
2023–	Cape Town Spurs	20	(0)
- * Club domestic league appearances and goals as of 11 September 2024

Neil Boshoff (born 22 January 1996) is a South African soccer player who plays as a goalkeeper for Cape Town Spurs in the National First Division.

He was born in Pinetown, attended Westville Boys High School and played for their school team. When the team won the Kloof High School Football Tournament in, Boshoff was named player of the tournament as the first goalkeeper to become so. Boshoff also attended the Westville United Football Academy and the Sharks Academy before joining AmaZulu. Here, he played in the Diski Challenge while goalkeepers came and went in the senior squad.

Following several years at AmaZulu without playing time, Boshoff made his first-tier debut in the 2019–20 South African Premier Division. He was surprisingly substituted in for Siyabonga Mbatha who injured himself during warmup. Boshoff held a clean sheet in that match, against Orlando Pirates. Boshoff ended with 10 league games in the 2019–20 season.

Boshoff still did not became AmaZulu's first choice; after Siyabonga Mbatha the club recruited Veli Mothwa. In the summer of 2022, Boshoff was released and continued on to Richards Bay. His playing time was very limited, and he went on to Cape Town Spurs after one year. The 2023–24 South African Premier Division ended in relegation for Cape Town Spurs, but Boshoff added another clean sheet to his name as the team beat Kaizer Chiefs 2–0 in May 2024, at the same time cementing Kaizer Chiefs' worst-ever league position of 10th.
