= Tshegofatso Nyama =

South African soccer player

Personal information
- Date of birth: 20 August 1999 (age 27)
- Position: Midfielder

Team information
- Current team: Cape Town City
- Number: 11

Senior career*
Years	Team	Apps	(Gls)
2018–2023	TS Galaxy	92	(3)
2023–	Cape Town City	16	(1)
- * Club domestic league appearances and goals as of 15 June 2024

Tshegofatso Nyama (born 20 August 1999) is a South African soccer player who plays as a midfielder for South African Premier Division side Cape Town City.

Playing several years for TS Galaxy, in June 2023 he joined Cape Town City. Reportedly, Orlando Pirates had also been interested in the player.

Nyama was named in the preliminary South Africa squad for the 2023 COSAFA Cup.
