= Siyanda Msani =

South African soccer player (born 2001)

Personal information
- Date of birth: 12 August 2001 (age 25)
- Place of birth: Umlazi, South Africa
- Position: Left back

Team information
- Current team: University of Pretoria (on loan from Mamelodi Sundowns)

Youth career
- Mamelodi Sundowns

Senior career*
Years	Team	Apps	(Gls)
2020–	Mamelodi Sundowns	0	(0)
2020–2022	→ University of Pretoria (loan)	56	(0)
2022–2023	→ Richards Bay (loan)	25	(0)
2023–2024	→ Cape Town Spurs (loan)	10	(0)
2024–	→ University of Pretoria (loan)	2	(0)

International career^{‡}
2022–	South Africa	6	(0)
- * Club domestic league appearances and goals as of 10 September 2024 ‡ National team caps and goals as of 8 August 2023

Siyanda Msani (born 12 August 2001) is a South African soccer player who plays as a defender for University of Pretoria on loan from Mamelodi Sundowns in the Premier Soccer League.

Msani was born in Umlazi. He was selected for a South African youth team to play at the 2019 African Games.

Msani joined Mamelodi Sundowns through its academy, but was loaned out to gain playing time. His first two seasons were spent at the University of Pretoria, nicknamed the AmaTuks. During his second season, Msani played every minute of every game, both in the league, cup and playoff. The AmaTuks lost the playoffs for promotion to the first tier.

Consequently, Msani was loaned to a first-tier club, namely Richards Bay. He made his first-tier debut in the 2022-23 South African Premier Division. He also was called up for South Africa for the 2022 COSAFA Cup, where he made his international debut. In September 2022 he was called up again, this time as a replacement for an injured Terrence Mashego. He was also named in the preliminary squad for the 2023 COSAFA Cup.

Following the 2022–23 season, it was stated that Msani would not continue at Richards Bay. Among the contenders for a new loan transfer was said to have been Stellenbosch. In July 2023, he was announced as a new Cape Town Spurs loan signing.
