= 2018 COSAFA U-20 Cup =

2018 COSAFA Under-20 Championship
Tournament details
- Host country: Zambia
- Dates: 2–13 December 2018
- Teams: 11 (from 1 association)

Final positions
- Champions: South Africa (8th title)
- Runners-up: Zimbabwe
- Third place: Angola
- Fourth place: Zambia

The 2018 COSAFA U-20 Cup was the 25th edition of the COSAFA U-20 Challenge Cup, an international youth competition open to national associations of the COSAFA region. It took place between 30 November and 13 December in Zambia.

The competition was open to players born on or after 1 January 1999.

== Participants ==
The 12 participating teams were announced on 25 October.

- Angola
- Botswana
- Lesotho
- Malawi
- Mauritius
- Mozambique
- DR Congo (replaced Réunion)
- South Africa
- Eswatini
- Zambia
- Zimbabwe

Réunion were initially set to take part but withdrew after Réunionese Football League were unable to organise flights to Zambia. They were replaced on 2 November with Democratic Republic of the Congo.

Namibia withdrew on 30 November, leaving no time to find a replacement.

== Match officials ==
Referees

- Nehemia Shoovaleka (Namibia)
- Audrick Nkole (Zambia)
- António Dungula (Angola)
- Osiase Koto (Lesotho)
- Alfred Chilinda (Malawi)
- Derrick Kafuli (Zambia)
- Pilan Ncube (Zimbabwe)
- (Eswatini) Thulani Sibandze (Swaziland)

Assistant Referees

- Shailesh Gobin (Mauritius)
- Pierre Jean Eric Andrivoavonjy (Madagascar)
- Venestancio Cossa (Mozambique)
- Edgar Rumeck (Zimbabwe)
- (Eswatini) Petros Mbingo (Swaziland)
- Edward Kambatuwa (Malawi)
- Mogomotsi Morakile (Botswana)
- Thomas Kaela (Zambia)
- Oliver Mweene (Zambia)

== Venues ==
Kitwe	Mufulira
Nkana Stadium	Shinde Stadium
12.8470278°S 28.2112143°E	12.5426122°S 28.2341274°E
Capacity: 12,000	Capacity: 9,000

== Draw ==
The draw took place on 31 October 2018.

== Groups ==
=== Group A ===
Pos	Team	Pld	W	D	L	GF	GA	GD	Pts	Qualification
1	Zambia	3	2	1	0	5	1	+4	7	Advance to knockout stage
2	Mozambique	3	1	2	0	3	2	+1	5	
3	DR Congo	3	1	0	2	3	4	−1	3	
4	Malawi	3	0	1	2	2	6	−4	1	

Source: COSAFA
2 December 2018
15:00

Malawi	0–2	Zambia
	Report	Mumba 63', 86'

Nkana Stadium, Kitwe
Referee: António Dungula (Angola)
5 December 2018
12:00

DR Congo	0–1	Mozambique
	Report	Catamo 48'

Shinde Stadium, Mufulira
Referee: Alfred Chilinda (Malawi)

6 December 2018
15:30

Malawi	1–1	Mozambique
Banda 21'	Report	Alifa 60'

Shinde Stadium, Mufulira
Referee: António Dungula (Angola)
6 December 2018
15:30

Zambia	2–0	DR Congo
Kolala 18'; Mumba 24'	Report

Nkana Stadium, Kitwe
Referee: Nehemia Shoovaleka (Namibia)

8 December 2018
15:30

Malawi	1–3	DR Congo
Batison 2'	Report	Fasika 8'; Nsingi 45'; Muleka 81'

Shinde Stadium, Mufulira
Referee: Thulani Sibandze (Swaziland)
8 December 2018
15:30

Zambia	1–1	Mozambique
Chilufya 13'	Report	Cumbane 78'

Nkana Stadium, Kitwe
Referee: Alfred Chilinda (Malawi)

=== Group B ===
Pos	Team	Pld	W	D	L	GF	GA	GD	Pts	Qualification
1	South Africa	2	2	0	0	9	0	+9	6	Advance to knockout stage
2	Mauritius	2	1	0	1	4	5	−1	3	
3	Eswatini	2	0	0	2	0	8	−8	0	

Updated to match(es) played on 3 December 2018. Source: COSAFA
3 December 2018
15:30

South Africa	5–0	Mauritius
Francois 2' (o.g.); Foster 13', 25'; Ngcobo 23'; Monyane 38'

Nkana Stadium, Kitwe
Referee: Osiase Koto (Lesotho)
6 December 2018
12:00

Mauritius	4–0	Eswatini
Aristide 5' (pen.); Francois 18'; Milazar 40'; Roussety 49'

Shinde Stadium, Mufulira
Referee: Pilan Ncube (Zimbabwe)
8 December 2018
13:00

South Africa	4–0	Eswatini

Nkana Stadium, Kitwe
Referee: Osiase Koto (Lesotho)

=== Group C ===
Pos	Team	Pld	W	D	L	GF	GA	GD	Pts	Qualification
1	Zimbabwe	3	2	0	1	7	5	+2	6	Advance to knockout stage
2	Angola	3	1	2	0	5	2	+3	5	Advance to knockout stage
3	Botswana	3	1	1	1	2	2	0	4	
4	Lesotho	3	0	1	2	1	6	−5	1	

Source: COSAFA
2 December 2018
11:00

Lesotho	1–1	Angola
Botsane 9'	Report	Liberal 64'

Nkana Stadium, Kitwe
Referee: Nehemia Shoovaleka (Namibia)
3 December 2018
12:00

Zimbabwe	2–1	Botswana
Murimba 2', 72'	Report	Thatanyane 44'

Nkana Stadium, Kitwe
Referee: Derrick Kafuli (Zambia)

5 December 2018
15:30

Zimbabwe	4–0	Lesotho
Murimba 45'; Tumba 48'; Nyamuziwa 64', 90'	Report

Shinde Stadium, Mufulira
Referee: Audrick Nkole (Zambia)
6 December 2018
13:00

Angola	0–0	Botswana
	Report

Nkana Stadium, Kitwe
Referee: Thulani Sibandze (Swaziland)

9 December 2018
15:30

Lesotho	0–1	Botswana
	Report	Mokherane 87' (o.g.)

Shinde Stadium, Mufulira
Referee: Pilan Ncube (Zimbabwe)
9 December 2018
15:30

Zimbabwe	1–4	Angola
Sarupinda 49'	Report	Liberal 6', 48'; Jelson 39' (pen.); Fernando 63'

Nkana Stadium, Kitwe
Referee: Audrick Nkole (Zambia)

== Knockout stage ==
=== Semifinals ===
11 December 2018
13:00

South Africa	1–0	Angola
Foster 28'

Nkana Stadium, Kitwe
Referee: Alfred Chilinda (Malawi)
11 December 2018
15:30

Zambia	1–2	Zimbabwe
Mwape 37'		Mbeba 39'; Murimba 70'

Nkana Stadium, Kitwe
Referee: Nehemia Shoovaleka (Namibia)

=== Third-Place ===
13 December 2018
12:00

Zambia	1–2	Angola

Nkana Stadium, Kitwe
Referee: Thulani Sibandze (Swaziland)

=== Final ===
13 December 2018
15:30

South Africa	1–1	Zimbabwe
Penalties
	4-3

Nkana Stadium, Kitwe
Referee: Osiase Koto (Lesotho)
