= 2020 COSAFA U-20 Cup =

2020 COSAFA Under-20 Cup
Tournament details
- Host country: Nelson Mandela Bay, South Africa
- Dates: 3–13 December 2020
- Teams: 11 (from 1 sub-confederation)
- Venue: 3 (in 1 host city)

Final positions
- Champions: Mozambique (1st title)
- Runners-up: Namibia
- Third place: Angola
- Fourth place: Zambia

Tournament statistics
- Matches played: 19
- Goals scored: 40 (2.11 per match)
- Top scorer: Sinenjongo Mkiva (South Africa) Zini Salvador (Angola)

The 2020 COSAFA U-20 Cup was the 27th edition of the COSAFA U-20 Challenge Cup, an international youth football tournament open to national associations of the COSAFA region. It took place between 3 December and 13 December in Nelson Mandela Bay, South Africa. Initially planned to be hosted by Mauritius, the competition was later shifted to South Africa after Mauritius withdrew as hosts due to the COVID-19 regulations. The matches were played at Port Elizabeth (Wolfson Stadium and Gelvandale Stadium).

The tournament was also the first qualifying round for the U-20 World Cup in Indonesia in 2021 as the finalists were qualified for the 2021 Africa U-20 Cup of Nations, played in Mauritania where the semi-finalists will see themselves qualify for the World Cup.

== Participants ==
- Angola
- Botswana
- Comoros
- Eswatini
- Lesotho
- Malawi
- Mozambique
- Namibia
- South Africa (Host)
- Zambia (Defending champions)
- Zimbabwe

== Match officials ==
Referees

- (South Africa) (Ms) Akhona Makalima (South Africa)
- (South Africa) Abongile Tom (South Africa)
- Mathews M. Hamalila (Zambia)
- (Ms) Letticia Viana (Eswatini)
- Keabetswe Dintwa (Botswana)
- Lebalang Martin Mokete (Lesotho)
- Ishmael Chizinga (Malawi)

Reserve Referees

- (Ms) Patience Mumba (Zambia)
- (Ms) Vistoria Nuusiku Shangula (Namibia)

Assistant Referees

- Venestancio Cossa (Mozambique)
- Tilolo Gaselame Molefe (Botswana)
- Edgar Rumeck (Zimbabwe)
- (Ms) Claris Simango (Zimbabwe)
- (Ms) Diana Chikotesha (Zambia)
- Shaun Siza Dlangamandla (Lesotho)
- (South Africa) Shaun Olive (South Africa)
- Clemence Kanduku (Malawi)
- Petros Mzi Mbingo (Eswatini)

== Draw ==
The draw was made in Nelson Mandela Bay on 2 November. Last year's top nations were seeded into one group each and the rest of the teams were placed in 2 pots depending on last year's performance. From the first pot, teams were drawn and slotted consecutively into groups A, B, and C. The last team from pot 1 was then placed among the pot 2 teams to make them 5. Now the teams from the second pot were drawn and slotted consecutively into groups A, B, and C resulting that group C ended up with one less team.

Seeded	Pot 1	Pot 2
Zambia (defending champions); South Africa (silver medalists); Angola (bronze medalists)	Eswatini (6 points in group); Botswana (4 points in group); Malawi (4 points in group); Mozambique (3 points in group)	Lesotho (1 points in group); Comoros (0 points in group); Namibia (Did not enter); Zimbabwe (Did not enter)

Note: Within brackets 2019 year's performance.

== Group stage ==
The group stage will be played in 3 groups as a round-robin, where the group winners and the best runner up will advance to the semi-finals.

=== Group A ===
Pos	Team	Pld	W	D	L	GF	GA	GD	Pts	Qualification
1	Mozambique	3	2	1	0	3	0	+3	7	Advance to Semi-finals
2	South Africa (H)	3	1	2	0	9	2	+7	5	
3	Zimbabwe	3	1	1	1	6	5	+1	4	
4	Lesotho	3	0	0	3	1	12	−11	0	

Source: COSAFA.com
(H) Hosts
3 December 2020
12:30

Mozambique	1–0	Lesotho
Cipriano 9'	Report

Wolfson Stadium, Port Elizabeth
Referee: (Ms) Akhona Makalima (South Africa)
3 December 2020
15:30

South Africa	2–2	Zimbabwe
Appollis 46'; Makola 90'	Report	Mutimbanyoka 9'; Mujokoro 75'

Wolfson Stadium, Port Elizabeth
Referee: (Ms) Letticia Viana (Eswatini)

6 December 2020
12:30

Mozambique	2–0	Zimbabwe
Cipriano 57' (pen.); Pinho 85'

Wolfson Stadium, Port Elizabeth
Referee: Ishmael Chizinga (Malawi)
6 December 2020
15:30

South Africa	7–0	Lesotho
Mohale 6' (o.g.); Human 17'; Mvika 43' 62' 86'; Appollis 46'; Myeni 90+2'

Wolfson Stadium, Port Elizabeth
Referee: Keabetswe Dintwa (Botswana)

8 December 2020
15:30

South Africa	0–0	Mozambique
	Report

Wolfson Stadium, Port Elizabeth
Referee: Lebalang Martin Mokete (Lesotho)
8 December 2020
15:30

Zimbabwe	4–1	Lesotho
Monyaka 19' (o.g.); Mandinyenya 22'; Mangiza 32'; Antonio 66'	Report	Lebina 45+2'

Gelvandale Stadium, Port Elizabeth
Referee: Keabetswe Dintwa (Botswana)

=== Group B ===
Pos	Team	Pld	W	D	L	GF	GA	GD	Pts	Qualification
1	Zambia	3	3	0	0	5	0	+5	9	Advance to Semi-finals
2	Namibia	3	2	0	1	3	2	+1	6	Advance to Semi-finals
3	Malawi	3	1	0	2	2	4	−2	3	
4	Comoros	3	0	0	3	0	4	−4	0	

Source: COSAFA.com
4 December 2020
12:30

Malawi	1–0	Comoros
Monogeni 90+4'

Wolfson Stadium, Port Elizabeth
Referee: Mathews Hamalila (Zambia)
4 December 2020
15:30

Zambia	1–0	Namibia
Mashata 62'

Wolfson Stadium, Port Elizabeth
Referee: Lebalang Martin Mokete (Lesotho)

7 December 2020
12:30

Zambia	2–0	Comoros
Chishimba 3'; Bulaya 45+4'

Wolfson Stadium, Port Elizabeth
Referee: Abongile Tom (South Africa)
7 December 2020
15:30

Malawi	1–2	Namibia
Nkhoma 10'		Jantze 14'; Canavaro 45+3'

Wolfson Stadium, Port Elizabeth
Referee: (Ms) Letticia Viana (Eswatini)

9 December 2020
15:30

Zambia	2–0	Malawi
Mukeya 21', 68'	Report

Wolfson Stadium, Port Elizabeth
Referee: (Ms) Akhona Makalima (South Africa)
9 December 2020
15:30

Namibia	1–0	Comoros
Damaseb 77'	Report

Gelvandale Stadium, Port Elizabeth
Referee: (Ms) Letticia Viana (Eswatini)

=== Group C ===
Pos	Team	Pld	W	D	L	GF	GA	GD	Pts	Qualification
1	Angola	2	1	0	1	4	1	+3	3	Advance to Semi-finals
2	Eswatini	2	1	0	1	1	1	0	3	
3	Botswana	2	1	0	1	1	4	−3	3	

Source: COSAFA.com
4 December 2020
15:30

Angola	0–1	Eswatini
		Ndlovu 77'

Gelvandale Stadium, Port Elizabeth
Referee: Abongile Tom (South Africa)

6 December 2020
15:30

Botswana	0–4	Angola
		Zini 43' (pen.) 90+2': Gastão 66' 90+4'

Gelvandale Stadium, Port Elizabeth
Referee: (Ms) Akhona Makalima (South Africa)

8 December 2020
12:30

Botswana	1–0	Eswatini
Molefe 42'	Report

Wolfson Stadium, Port Elizabeth
Referee: Mathews M. Hamalila (Zambia)

== Knockout stage ==
Semi-finals
11 December – Wolfson Stadium
Angola	0
Namibia	1
11 December – Wolfson Stadium
Mozambique	0 (5)
Zambia	0 (4)

Final
13 December – Wolfson Stadium
Namibia	0
Mozambique	1
Third place
13 December – Wolfson Stadium
Angola	2
Zambia	1

=== Semi-finals ===
Winners qualified for 2021 Africa U-20 Cup of Nations.

11 December 2020
12:00

Angola	0–1	Namibia
	Report	Damaseb 63'

Wolfson Stadium, Port Elizabeth
Referee: (Ms) Akhona Makalima (South Africa)
11 December 2020
15:30

Mozambique	0–0 (5–4 pen.)	Zambia
	Report

Wolfson Stadium, Port Elizabeth
Referee: Keabetswe Dintwa (Botswana)

==== Third-place match ====
13 December 2020
12:00

Angola	2–1	Zambia
Afonso 21'; Salvador 37'		Mumba 57' (pen.)

Nelson Mandela Bay Stadium, Port Elizabeth
Referee: (Ms) Letticia Viana (Eswatini)

==== Final ====
13 December 2020
15:00

Namibia	0–1	Mozambique
	Report	Augusto 31'

Nelson Mandela Bay Stadium, Port Elizabeth
Referee: Abongile Tom (South Africa)

== Champions ==
2020 COSAFA U-20 Championship champion

Mozambique
First title

== Qualification for CAF U20 Cup of Nations ==
The two finalists of the tournament qualified for the 2021 Africa U-20 Cup of Nations.

Qualified nations:

- Mozambique
- Namibia
