= Kagiso Malinga =

South African soccer player

Personal information
- Full name: Kagiso Joseph Malinga
- Date of birth: 21 January 1995 (age 31)
- Height: 1.75 m (5 ft 9 in)
- Positions: Midfielder; winger

Team information
- Current team: Golden Arrows
- Number: 7

Senior career*
Years	Team	Apps	(Gls)
2019	SuperSport United	2	(0)
2019–2024	Moroka Swallows	96	(19)
2024–	Golden Arrows	8	(1)

International career^{‡}
2021	South Africa	6	(1)
- * Club domestic league appearances and goals as of 1 August 2024 ‡ National team caps and goals as of 12 June 2023

Kagiso Joseph Malinga (born 21 January 1995) is a South African soccer player who plays as a midfielder for Golden Arrows in the Premier Soccer League.

Malinga was called up for South Africa for the 2021 COSAFA Cup, playing 6 games in the tournament and scoring against Botswana. South Africa won the cup.

Playing several seasons for the Moroka Swallows, he was reportedly followed by South African top team Orlando Pirates for an extended period of time.
