= Schumacher Kuwali =

Malawian footballer

Personal information
- Date of birth: 27 June 1996 (age 30)
- Place of birth: Lilongwe, Malawi
- Height: 1.65 m (5 ft 5 in)
- Position: Midfielder

Team information
- Current team: Blue Eagles

Senior career*
Years	Team	Apps	(Gls)
2014–2015	Blue Eagles		
2016–2018	Ferroviário de Nampula		
2019	Blue Eagles		
2020–2021	UD Songo		
2022–	Blue Eagles		

International career^{‡}
2015–	Malawi	16	(1)
- * Club domestic league appearances and goals as of 11 June 2023 ‡ National team caps and goals as of 11 June 2023

Schumacher Kuwali (born 27 June 1996) is a Malawian football midfielder who currently plays for Blue Eagles. He has also played for two clubs in Mozambique, Ferroviário de Nampula and UD Songo. Making his international debut for Malawi in 2016, he scored his first international goal at the 2021 COSAFA Cup.
