= Selaelo Rasebotja =

South African soccer player

Personal information
- Date of birth: 26 April 2001 (age 25)
- Place of birth: Mokopane, South Africa
- Height: 1.78 m (5 ft 10 in)
- Position: Midfielder

Team information
- Current team: Orlando Pirates
- Number: 31

Youth career
- 2020–2021: SuperSport United

Senior career*
Years	Team	Apps	(Gls)
2021–2024	SuperSport United	29	(1)
2024–	Orlando Pirates	4	(0)

International career^{‡}
- South Africa U20
2022–	South Africa	3	(1)
- * Club domestic league appearances and goals as of 3 January 2026 ‡ National team caps and goals as of 11 June 2023

Selaelo Rasebotja (born 26 April 2001) is a South African soccer player who plays as a midfielder for Orlando Pirates in the South African Premier Division.

He hails from Limpopo Province. While attending a football school of excellence, he represented South Africa U20 at the 2019 COSAFA U-20 Cup. He was signed by SuperSport United to their youth selection, being drafted into the senior team in the summer of 2021. Following his debut for SuperSport United, manager Kaitano Tembo nicknamed Rasebotja "Iniesta".

Rasebotja was called up to Bafana Bafana for the 2022 COSAFA Cup. Here, South Africa lost to Mozambique on penalty shootouts. In a consolation tournament known as the Plate, Butsaka scored his first international goal against Botswana. Subsequently, SuperSport United refused to let Rasebotja or any other of their players join the South African team for the 2022 African Nations Championship qualification against Comoros, citing that the 2022-23 South African Premier Division start was too close.
