= Benarfa (footballer) =

Angolan footballer (born 2001)

Personal information
- Full name: Mankoka Hegene Afonso
- Date of birth: 25 January 2001 (age 25)
- Height: 1.82 m (6 ft 0 in)
- Position: Striker

Team information
- Current team: Kabuscorp
- Number: 49

Senior career*
Years	Team	Apps	(Gls)
2018–2020	Progresso Sambizanga	20	(6)
2020–2021	Bravos do Maquis	25	(8)
2021–2023	1º de Agosto	27	(6)
2023–2024	Kabuscorp	23	(15)
2024–2026	Moss	39	(3)
2026-	Kabuscorp	13	(10)

International career^{‡}
2023	Angola U-23	4	(2)
2021–	Angola	7	(1)
- * Club domestic league appearances and goals as of 10 November 2025 ‡ National team caps and goals as of 2 September 2024

Mankoka Hegene Afonso, nicknamed Benarfa (born 25 January 2001) is an Angolan football striker who plays for Kabuscorp.

== Career ==
He spent the start of his career in Clube Chave de Ouro in Uíge, Sambizanga and Contemplate Futebol Clube in Fubú, Talatona. Following spells at the Girabola clubs Progresso Sambizanga, Bravos do Maquis and Primeiro de Agosto, where he at best scored 5 to 8 goals in a season, he joined Kabuscorp S.C.P. in 2023. With 15 league goals in 23 games, he became top goalscorer of the 2023–24 Girabola. He also broke the internal record in Kabuscorp, where Daniel Mpele Mpele previously had scored 14 goals in one season, whereas Benarfa was behind Albert Meyong Ze's goalscoring record in the Girabola.

Benarfa made his debut for Angola in 2021. He played in the 2023 COSAFA Cup and the 2024 COSAFA Cup, which Angola won.

In the summer of 2024 he was signed as a free agent by Norwegian First Division club Moss FK. Being a Portuguese speaker, Benarfa would reside with Moss' Portuguese back João Barros. Following a short period of adjustment to a new continent, he scored his first goal against Sogndal.

== Personal life ==
The nickname Benarfa was given to him in childhood. Benarfa hardly knew his father, and lost his mother in 2016, whereafter he lived with his five brothers.

== Honours ==
International

- COSAFA Cup: 2023
