= 2021 COSAFA Cup =

Tournament details
- Host country: South Africa
- City: Port Elizabeth
- Dates: 6–18 July
- Teams: 10
- Venues: 2 (in 1 host city)

Final positions
- Champions: South Africa (5th title)
- Runners-up: Senegal
- Third place: Eswatini
- Fourth place: Mozambique

Tournament statistics
- Matches played: 24
- Goals scored: 53 (2.21 per match)
- Top scorer(s): (South Africa) Sepana Letsoalo (4 goals)
- Best player: (South Africa) Siyethemba Sithebe
- Best goalkeeper: (South Africa) Veli Mothwa (5 Clean Sheets)

The 2021 COSAFA Cup was the 20th edition of the COSAFA Cup, an international football competition consisting of national teams of member nations of the Council of Southern Africa Football Associations (COSAFA). It took place on 6–18 July 2021.

Zambia is the defending champion, having defeated Botswana, 1–0, in the previous edition's final on 8 June 2019.

== Participating nations ==
National team	FIFA Ranking (27 May 2021)	Best Performance
Eswatini	154	Semi-finals (1999, 2002, 2003, 2021)
Madagascar (withdrew)	100	Third Place (2015)
Zimbabwe	107	Champions (2002, 2003, 2005, 2009, 2017, 2018)
Comoros (withdrew)	131	Group stage
Lesotho	146	Runner-Up (2000)
Senegal (Invited guest)	22	Debut
Botswana	150	Runner-Up (2016, 2019)
Malawi	115	Runner-Up (2002, 2003)
Zambia	87	Champions (1997, 1998, 2006, 2013, 2019)
Mozambique	117	Runner-Up (2008, 2015)
Namibia	111	Champions (2015)
South Africa	75	Champions (2002, 2007, 2008, 2016)

== Venue ==
Matches will held at the Nelson Mandela Bay Stadium and Wolfson Stadium in Port Elizabeth, South Africa.

Port Elizabeth	Port Elizabeth is located in South Africa	Port Elizabeth
Nelson Mandela Bay Stadium	Port Elizabeth is located in South Africa	Wolfson Stadium
Capacity: 42,486	Port Elizabeth is located in South Africa	Capacity: 10,000

== Draw ==
The draw for the 2021 COSAFA Cup was staged in host city Nelson Mandela Bay on Thursday, June 17, 2021.

== Grouping line ==
Group A	Group B
South Africa; Eswatini; Zambia; Botswana; Lesotho	Senegal; Mozambique; Namibia; Malawi; Zimbabwe

== Match officials ==
Referees

1. Abongile Tom (South Africa)
2. Brighton Chimene (Zimbabwe)
3. Antonio Caluassi Dungula (Angola)
4. Eldrick Adelaide (Seychelles)
5. Akhona Makalima (South Africa)
6. Thulani Sibandze (Eswatini)
7. Wilson Julio Muianga (Mozambique)
8. Keabetswe Dintwa (Botswana)
9. Osiase Koto (Lesotho)
10. Audrick Nkole (Zambia)

Assistant Referees

1. Diana Chikotesha (Zambia)
2. Brighton Nyika (Zimbabwe)
3. Petros Mzi Mbingo (Eswatini)
4. Moses Singeve (Namibia)
5. Lucky Kegakologetswe (Botswana)
6. Siza Dlangamandla (Lesotho)
7. Joseph Nyauti (Malawi)
8. Ivanildo Meirelles Lopes (Angola)

== Group stages ==
Tiebreakers

Teams are ranked according to points (3 points for a win, 1 point for a draw, 0 points for a loss), and if tied on points, the following tiebreaking criteria are applied, in the order given, to determine the rankings (Regulations Article 9.3)

1. Points in head-to-head matches among tied teams;
2. Goal difference in head-to-head matches among tied teams;
3. Goals scored in head-to-head matches among tied teams;
4. If more than two teams are tied, and after applying all head-to-head criteria above, a subset of teams are still tied, all head-to-head criteria above are reapplied exclusively to this subset of teams;
5. Goal difference in all group matches;
6. Goals scored in all group matches;
7. Penalty shoot-out if only two teams are tied and they met in the last round of the group;
8. Disciplinary points (yellow card = 1 point, red card as a result of two yellow cards = 3 points, direct red card = 3 points, yellow card followed by direct red card = 4 points);
9. Drawing of lots.
- All matches will be held at Port Elizabeth
- Time listed are UTC+2:00

Key to colour in group tables
Group Winners and Runners-up advance to the Semi-finals

=== Group A ===
Pos	Team	Pld	W	D	L	GF	GA	GD	Pts	Qualification
1	South Africa (H)	4	3	1	0	6	0	+6	10	Semi-finals
2	Eswatini	4	2	1	1	5	3	+2	7	Semi-finals
3	Zambia	4	1	1	2	3	4	−1	4	
4	Botswana	4	1	1	2	6	4	+2	4	
5	Lesotho	4	1	0	3	3	12	−9	3	

Source: Soccerway
Rules for classification: Group stage tiebreakers
(H) Hosts
6 July 2021
14:00 UTC+2

Eswatini	3–1	Lesotho
J. Figuaredo (yellow card) 30'; F. Badenhorst 42'; K. Khethukulhe 57'; M. Mabelesa (yellow card) 66'; F. Mamba (yellow card) 45' (goal) 78'	Report	J. Thabantso (red card) 7'; T. Khutlang 45+4'; T. Bereng (yellow card) 72'

Nelson Mandela Bay Stadium, Port Elizabeth
Referee: Abongile Tom (South Africa)
6 July 2021
17:00 UTC+2

South Africa	1–0	Botswana
K. Malinga 6'; R. Reuck (yellow card) 8'	Report	G. Mohutsiwa (yellow card) 45+1'

Nelson Mandela Bay Stadium, Port Elizabeth
Referee: Brighton Chimene (Zimbabwe)

8 July 2021
12:00 UTC+2

Zambia	1–2	Lesotho
K. Chongo (yellow card) 1'; J. Shonga 2'; B. Sakala (yellow card) 6'	Report	L. Fothoane (yellow card) 20'; B. Makepe (yellow card) 37'; S. Motebang 70', 88'

Wolfson Stadium, Port Elizabeth
Referee: Akhona Makalima (South Africa)
8 July 2021
15:00 UTC+2

South Africa	1–0	Eswatini
S. Mkhulise (yellow card) 42'; T. Sibanyoni 59' (yellow card) 88'	Report	F. Mamba (yellow card) 26'; F. Badenhorst (yellow card) 26' (yellow-red card) 45+1'

Wolfson Stadium, Port Elizabeth
Referee: Wilson Julio Muianga (Mozambique)

10 July 2021
12:00 UTC+2

Lesotho	0–4	Botswana
N. Masoabi (yellow card) 37'; L. Mphuthi (yellow card) 45+3'; N. Lerotholi (yellow card) 47'	Report	T. Setsile (yellow card) 18'; T. Orebonye 28', 45+4' (pen.), 69'; G. Mohutsiwa (yellow card) 48'; T. Kgamanyane 73'

Wolfson Stadium, Port Elizabeth
Referee: Thulani Sibandze (Eswatini)
10 July 2021
15:00 UTC+2

Zambia	0–1	Eswatini
K. Chongo (yellow card) 19'; Z. Chilongoshi (yellow card) 61'; D. Chanda (yellow card) 65'; K. Kampamba (yellow card) 68'; S. Silwimba (yellow card) 86'	Report	M. Mabelesa (yellow card) 51'; S. Gomedze 53'; S. Mathabela (yellow card) 56'; S. Magagula (yellow card) 57'; L. Mkhona (yellow card) 76'; F. Mamba (yellow card) 84'

Wolfson Stadium, Port Elizabeth
Referee: Abongile Tom (South Africa)

13 July 2021
15:00 UTC+2

Botswana	1–2	Zambia
B. Sakala (yellow card) 4'; S. Phiri (yellow card) 5'; T. Kgamanyane 62'	Report	J. Shonga 21', 83' (pen.); T. Orebonye (yellow card) 47'; M. Johnson (yellow card) 67'

Wolfson Stadium, Port Elizabeth
Referee: Thulani Sibandze (Eswatini)
13 July 2021
15:00 UTC+2

South Africa	4–0	Lesotho
S. Letsoalo 5', 44', 57' S. Mkhulise 20'; N. Ngcobo (yellow card) 74'; M. Mphahlele (yellow card) 89'	Report	L. Fothoane (yellow card) 40'; B. Makepe (yellow card) 56'; M. Nkoto (yellow card) 67'; T. Toloane (yellow card) 73'

Nelson Mandela Bay Stadium, Port Elizabeth
Referee: Audrick Nkole (Zambia)

14 July 2021
15:00 UTC+2

South Africa	0–0	Zambia
Dube (yellow card) 90'	Report	Chanda (yellow card) 56'

Nelson Mandela Bay Stadium, Port Elizabeth
Referee: Brighton Chimene (Zimbabwe)
14 July 2021
15:00 UTC+2

Eswatini	1–1	Botswana
Ndzinisa 19'; Mkhonta (yellow card) 34'; Figuareido (yellow card) 69'; Gamedze (yellow card) 71'	Report	Kgamanyane (yellow card) 45+1', (goal) 65'; Mohutsiwa (yellow card) 89'

Wolfson Stadium, Port Elizabeth
Referee: Audrick Nkole (Zambia)

=== Group B ===
Pos	Team	Pld	W	D	L	GF	GA	GD	Pts	Qualification
1	Senegal	4	3	0	1	6	4	+2	9	Semi-finals
2	Mozambique	4	2	1	1	3	1	+2	7	Semi-finals
3	Namibia	4	2	1	1	5	3	+2	7	
4	Malawi	4	0	2	2	4	7	−3	2	
5	Zimbabwe	4	0	2	2	3	6	−3	2	

Source: Soccerway
Rules for classification: Group stage tiebreakers
7 July 2021
12:00 UTC+2

Mozambique	0–0	Zimbabwe
A. Nhantumbo (yellow card) 52'; F. Simbine (yellow card) 65'; C. Mathe (yellow card) 79'; H. Salas (yellow card) 84'	Report	Q. Amini (yellow card) 27'; D. Murimba (yellow card) 72'; P. Musaka (yellow card) 82'

Wolfson Stadium, Port Elizabeth
Referee: Eldrick Adelaide (Seychelles)
7 July 2021
15:00 UTC+2

Senegal	1–2	Namibia
A. Diène 17' (yellow card) 67'; A. Diop (yellow card) 26'; D. Mendy (yellow card) 71'	Report	M. Papama 13'; E. Kambindu 50'; D. Fredericks (yellow card) 88'

Wolfson Stadium, Port Elizabeth
Referee: Antonio Caluassi Dungula (Angola)

9 July 2021
12:00 UTC+2

Malawi	2–2	Zimbabwe
K. Muyaba 27'; S. Kuwali 50'; M. Sulumba (yellow card) 66'; C. Chirwa (yellow card) 76'	Report	R. Hachiro (yellow card) 45+1'; B. Sarupinda 62'; A. Mbeba (yellow card) 72'; P. Musaka 79'

Wolfson Stadium, Port Elizabeth
Referee: Keabetswe Dintwa (Botswana)
9 July 2021
15:00 UTC+2

Senegal	1–0	Mozambique
El-Hadji Kane (yellow card) 15'; P. Djitte 63'; Sane (yellow card) 82'; Mohamed Ba (yellow card) 86'	Report

Wolfson Stadium, Port Elizabeth
Referee: Osiase Koto (Lesotho)

11 July 2021
14:00 UTC+2

Namibia	2–0	Zimbabwe
D. Fredricks (yellow card) 10'; I. Kamberipa (yellow card) 52'; Q. Amini 70' (o.g.); A. Iimbondi (yellow card) 76'; E. Kambindu 86'	Report	S. Nyahwa (yellow card) 81'; Malvin Enos Mkolo (yellow card) 85'

Nelson Mandela Bay Stadium, Port Elizabeth
Referee: Audrick Nkole (Zambia)
11 July 2021
17:00 UTC+2

Mozambique	2–0	Malawi
. Muze (yellow card) 53'; V. Vitinho 55' (pen.) (yellow card) 60'; Shafiquille (yellow card) 65'; F. Simbine 68'; E. Siluane (yellow card) 89'	Report	C. Chirwa (yellow card) 14'; S. Kuwali (yellow card) 22'

Nelson Mandela Bay Stadium, Port Elizabeth
Referee: Brighton Chimene (Zimbabwe)

13 July 2021
12:00 UTC+2

Senegal	2–1	Zimbabwe
A. Ndoye 44'; M. Ba 88'	Report	Q. Amini 3' (pen.) S. Nyahwa (yellow card) 58'

Nelson Mandela Bay Stadium, Port Elizabeth
Referee: Abongile Tom (South Africa)
13 July 2021
12:00 UTC+2

Malawi	1–1	Namibia
M. Mhone 73'	Report	N. Theophilus (yellow card) 49'; W. Stephanus (yellow card) 50'; L. Horaeb (yellow card) 50'; I. Heita (yellow card) 88'; E. Kambindu 53'

Wolfson Stadium, Port Elizabeth
Referee: Akhona Makalima (South Africa)

14 July 2021
12:00 UTC+2

Mozambique	1–0	Namibia
Simbine (yellow card) 28'; Pelembe (yellow card) 71'; Cândinho (yellow card) 73'; Melito 80'	Report	Kambindu (yellow card) 9'; Gebhardt (yellow card) 15'; Fredericks (yellow card) 45+1'

Wolfson Stadium, Port Elizabeth
Referee: Osiase Koto (Lesotho)
14 July 2021
12:00 UTC+2

Senegal	2–1	Malawi
Diop 11', 90+1'; Ndoye (yellow card) 63'; Gueye (yellow card) 76'	Report	Muyaba 35'; Sanudi (yellow card) 43'

Nelson Mandela Bay Stadium, Port Elizabeth
Referee: Keabetswe Dintwa (Bostswana)

== Knockout stage ==
- In the knockout stage, extra-time and a penalty shoot-out will be used to decide the winner if necessary.

=== Bracket ===
Semi-finals
16 July – Port Elizabeth
Senegal (p)	2 (3)
Eswatini	2 (0)
16 July – Port Elizabeth
South Africa	3
Mozambique	0

Final
18 July – Port Elizabeth
Senegal	0 (4)
South Africa (p)	0 (5)
Third place match
18 July– Port Elizabeth
Eswatini (p)	1 (4)
Mozambique	1 (2)

== Semi-finals ==
16 July 2021
14:00 UTC+2

Senegal	2–2	Eswatini
P. Djitte 58'; M. Ndiaye (yellow card) 71'; E. Kane 80'	Report	S. Magagula (yellow card) 11'; S. Matse 15'; S. Ndzinisa 20'; F. Mamba (yellow card) 63' (yellow-red card) 67'
Penalties
E. Kane (penalty scored); A. Dien (penalty scored); M. Ba (penalty scored)	3–0	S. Gamedze (penalty missed); S. Ndzinisa (penalty missed); N. Mamba (penalty missed)

Nelson Mandela Bay Stadium, Port Elizabeth
Referee: Osiase Koto (Lesotho)
16 July 2021
17:00 UTC+2

South Africa	3–0	Mozambique
N. Ngcobo 24' (yellow card) 62'; S. Sithebe (yellow card) 39'; M. Maart 59'; S. Letsoalo 73' (pen.)	Report	F. Macaime (yellow card) 33'; S. Shaquille (yellow card) 45+1'; D. Muzé (yellow card) 58'; J. Pelembe (yellow card) 79'; N. Ernesto (yellow card) 86'

Nelson Mandela Bay Stadium, Port Elizabeth
Referee: Brighton Chimene (Zimbabwe)

== Third place match ==
18 July 2021
12:00 UTC+2

Eswatini	1–1 (a.e.t.)	Mozambique
S. Magagula (yellow card) 42'; K. Mkhontfo 89'	Report	C. Mathe (yellow card) 4'; S. Nangy (yellow card) 14'; D. Muzé (yellow card) 15'; M. Thauzene 39'
Penalties
P. Dlamini (penalty scored); L. Mkhonta (penalty scored); S. Mkhwanazi (penalty scored); S. Mathabela (penalty scored)	4–2	J. Mapangane (penalty scored); S. Nangy (penalty scored); S. Malico (penalty missed); A. Alifa (penalty missed)

Nelson Mandela Bay Stadium, Port Elizabeth
Referee: Abongile Tom (South Africa)

== Final ==
18 July 2021
15:30 UTC+2

Senegal	0–0 (a.e.t.)	South Africa
	Report
Penalties
E. Kane (penalty scored); A. Diene (penalty scored); F. Fall (penalty scored); D. Mendy (penalty missed); M. Ba (penalty scored); P. N'diaye (penalty missed)	4–5	L. Maboe (penalty scored); S. Sithebe (penalty scored); E. Brooks (penalty missed); S. Ngobeni (penalty scored); V. Mothwa (penalty scored); N. Mobbie (penalty scored)

Nelson Mandela Bay Stadium, Port Elizabeth
Referee: Audrick Nkole (Zambia)

== Statistics ==
=== Goalscorers ===
There were 53 goals scored in 24 matches, for an average of 2.21 goals per match.

4 goals

- (South Africa) Sepana Letsoalo

3 goals

- (Botswana) Thatayaone Kgamanyane
- (Botswana) Tumisang Orebonye
- (Namibia) Elmo Kambindu
- (Zambia) Justin Shonga

2 goals

- (Eswatini) Sabelo Ndzinisa
- (Lesotho) Sera Motebang
- (Malawi) Khuda Ike Muyaba
- (Senegal) Pepe Massar Dijitte
- (Senegal) Abu Bakry Diop

1 goal

- (Eswatini) Felix Badenhorst
- (Eswatini) Sandile Gomedze
- (Eswatini) Fanelo Mamba
- (Eswatini) Sifiso Matse
- (Eswatini) Khethukulhe Mkhontfo
- (Lesotho) Tumelo Khutlang
- (Malawi) Schumacher Kuwali
- (Malawi) Micium Mhone
- (Mozambique) Melque Melito
- (Mozambique) Fancisco Simbine
- (Mozambique) Victor Jancinto Vitinho
- (Namibia) Marcel Papama
- (Senegal) Mohamed Rassoul Ba
- (Senegal) Albert Diène
- (Senegal) El Hadji Kane
- (Senegal) Abdoul Ndoye
- (South Africa) Moegamat Yusuf Maart
- (South Africa) Kagiso Joseph Malinga
- (South Africa) Sphelele Mkhulise
- (South Africa) Njabulo Ngcobo
- (South Africa) Thabang Sibanyoni
- (Zimbabwe) Qadr Amini
- (Zimbabwe) Patrick Ben Musaka
- (Zimbabwe) Blessing Sarupinda
- (Eswatini) Khetkhokuhle Mkhontfo
- (Mozambique) Martinho Alberto Thauzene

1 own goal

- (Zimbabwe) Qadr Amini (against Namibia)
