= Mash Mphahlele =

South African soccer player

Mashweu Mphahlele
Personal information
- Full name: Mashweu Basil Mphahlele
- Date of birth: 27 September 1999 (age 27)
- Place of birth: Johannesburg, South Africa
- Height: 1.80 m (5 ft 11 in)
- Position: Defender

Senior career*
Years	Team	Apps	(Gls)
2020–2023	Baroka	42	(0)
2023–2024	Stellenbosch	2	(0)
2024	Moroka Swallows	11	(0)

International career^{‡}
2021–2022	South Africa	5	(0)
- * Club domestic league appearances and goals as of 16 March 2025 ‡ National team caps and goals as of 16 March 2025

Mashweu "Mash" Basil Mphahlele (born 27 September 1999) is a South African soccer player who plays as a defender. He has represented three clubs in the Premiership and been capped for South Africa.

He was born in Johannesburg. He was included in Baroka's senior squad and made his first-tier debut in the 2020-21 South African Premiership. The 2021–22 season resulted in relegation for Baroka, something that the FAR Post among others attributed to Mphahlele losing his form in right back position and having to be replaced. A year later, Mphahlele was able to return to the Premiership when signed by Stellenbosch. He very rarely played for the Stellies, and in February 2024 he was allowed to move on to Moroka Swallows, who were rebuilding their squad after parting with 22 players who went on strike.

Mphahlele was selected to represent South Africa at the 2021 COSAFA Cup. South Africa won the tournament, its first in 5 years. Mphahlele also played a 2022 African Nations Championship qualification match against Angola, bringning his tally of caps to 5.
