= Ethan Brooks (soccer) =

South African professional soccer player

Personal information
- Full name: Ethan Duncan Brooks
- Date of birth: 22 November 2001 (age 24)
- Place of birth: Johannesburg, South Africa
- Height: 1.75 m (5 ft 9 in)
- Position: Midfielder

Team information
- Current team: Panserraikos
- Number: 28

Youth career
- Panorama FC
- TS Galaxy

Senior career*
Years	Team	Apps	(Gls)
2020–2022	TS Galaxy	40	(0)
2022–2025	AmaZulu	49	(2)
2025–	Panserraikos	18	(0)

International career^{‡}
2020–	South Africa U20	3	(0)
2021–	South Africa	13	(0)
- * Club domestic league appearances and goals as of 14 June 2026 ‡ National team caps and goals as of 23 October 2022

Ethan Duncan Brooks (born 1 March 2001) is a South African professional soccer player who plays as a midfielder for Greek Super League club Panserraikos and the South Africa national team.

== Club career ==
Born in Johannesburg, Brooks started his career with amateur side Panorama FC before being scouted by TS Galaxy in 2018, signing a contract with them a few days later. He made his debut for the club in a 2–2 National First Division draw with Cape Umoya United and two further appearances that season as TS Galaxy bought the South African Premier Division status of Highlands Park for the 2020–21 season. He made his Premier Division debut in December 2020 in a 2–0 defeat to Mamelodi Sundowns as he made 12 appearances in total across the 2020–21 season.

== International career ==
After making his debut for South Africa against Uganda in June 2021, he was part of South Africa's squad at the 2021 COSAFA Cup.
