= Lanjesi Nkhoma =

Malawian footballer (born 2002)

Personal information
- Date of birth: 27 May 2002 (age 24)
- Place of birth: Blantyre, Malawi
- Height: 1.75 m (5 ft 9 in)
- Position: Forward

Team information
- Current team: TP Mazembe

Youth career
- –2021: Nyasa Big Bullets

Senior career*
Years	Team	Apps	(Gls)
2021–2024	Nyasa Big Bullets		
2024–	TP Mazembe		

International career^{‡}
2022–	Malawi	15	(4)
- * Club domestic league appearances and goals as of 14:47, 11 June 2024 (UTC) ‡ National team caps and goals as of 14:58, 5 September 2024 (UTC)

Lanjesi Nkhoma (born 27 May 2002) is a Malawian association footballer who plays for Linafoot club TP Mazembe and the Malawi national team.

== Club career ==
Nkhoma came up through the youth ranks of Super League club Nyasa Big Bullets FC. He was promoted to the first team from the reserve side for the 2020–21 season. Nkhoma went on to make his senior debut against Mzuzu Warriors on 3 April 2021, entering the match as a second-half substitute.

Nkhoma finished the 2023 season with fourteen goals to finish second in the Golden Boot race, only two goals behind Clement Nyondo. That season, he made history by scoring in the final of all three of the country's major cup competitions (FDH Bank Cup, Castel Challenge Cup, and Airtel Top 8 Cup) with Nyasa Big Bullets taking home all three trophies in addition to winning the league. Following the Castel Cup, he was named player of the tournament. In the final competition, the 2023 Airtel Top 8, he scored a brace in the final to secure the victory and top the scoring charts. In 2022, he was the joint-top scorer in the same competition.

Following his stellar 2023 season, Lanjesi stated that he was ready to move to a club abroad, including one in Europe. Because of his standout performance at the 2023 COSAFA Cup, he reportedly received interest from Orlando Pirates and Kaiser Chiefs, both of South Africa's DsTV Premiership. Prior to the 2024 season, Nkhoma was linked to a move to Al-Hilal of the Sudan Premier League but the deal fell through because of the Sudan Civil War. In June 2024, the player was reportedly a transfer target of Congolese giants TP Mazembe. Following three months of negotiations, Nkhoma was officially transferred to Linafoot club in late August 2024. Although the transfer fee was undisclosed, it was believed by local media that Big Bullets received a total of K140 million for Nkhoma and teammate Patrick Mwaungulu.

== International career ==
Nkhoma represented Malawi at the youth level, including as a member of the under-20 national team at the 2019 COSAFA U-20 Cup. He scored one goal in the competition, a group stage tally against Botswana. Nkhoma made his senior international debut on 27 August 2022 in a 2022 African Nations Championship qualification match against Mozambique. In his next match, a friendly against the same opponent, Nkhoma scored his first senior international goal in the 1–1 draw.

In summer 2023, Nkhoma was called up to participate in the 2023 COSAFA Cup. He went on to be named to the tournament's Best XI following the Group Stage which included a goal against the Seychelles. In June 2023, he was recalled to the senior squad for 2026 FIFA World Cup qualification. He went on to score in a 3–1 victory over São Tomé and Príncipe that kept the team's qualification hopes alive.

=== International goals ===
Last updated 5 September 2024.

No	Date	Venue	Opponent	Score	Result	Competition
1.	14 June 2023	Estádio do Zimpeto, Maputo, Mozambique	Mozambique	1–1	1–1	Friendly
2.	9 July 2023	King Zwelithini Stadium, Durban, South Africa	Seychelles	1–0	2–0	2023 COSAFA Cup
3.	6 June 2024	Bingu National Stadium, Lilongwe, Malawi	São Tomé and Príncipe	2–1	3–1	2026 FIFA World Cup qualification
4.	5 September 2024	Bingu National Stadium, Lilongwe, Malawi	Burundi	2–2	2–3	2025 Africa Cup of Nations qualification
Last updated 5 September 2024

=== International career statistics ===
As of match played 5 September 2024.

Malawi national team
2022	1	0
2023	9	2
2024	5	2
Total	15	4
