= Chumani Butsaka =

South African soccer player

Personal information
- Full name: Chumani Thembile Butsaka
- Date of birth: 3 October 2001 (age 25)
- Place of birth: Cape Town, South Africa
- Height: 1.74 m (5 ft 9 in)
- Position: Winger

Team information
- Current team: Stellenbosch
- Number: 33

Senior career*
Years	Team	Apps	(Gls)
2021–2024	Cape Town Spurs	103	(5)
2024–	Stellenbosch	33	(2)

International career^{‡}
2022–	South Africa	1	(1)
- * Club domestic league appearances and goals as of 4 January 2026 ‡ National team caps and goals as of 11 June 2023

Chumani Thembile Butsaka (born 3 October 2001) is a South African soccer player who plays as a winger for Stellenbosch in the Premier Soccer League.

== Club career ==
Butsaka signed for Stellenbosch in September 2024.

== International career ==
Butsaka was called up to Bafana Bafana for the 2022 COSAFA Cup. Here, South Africa lost to Mozambique on penalty shootouts. In a consolation tournament known as the Plate, Butsaka scored his first international goal against Madagascar.
