= Elmo Kambindu =

Namibian footballer

Personal information
- Full name: Wazza Elmo Kambindu
- Date of birth: 26 May 1993 (age 33)
- Place of birth: Otjiwarongo, Namibia
- Position: Forward

Team information
- Current team: AmaZulu
- Number: 93

Senior career*
Years	Team	Apps	(Gls)
2012–2013	Okakarara Young Warriors		
2013–2014	Tura Magic		
2014–2015	Touch & Go		
2015–2017	Life Fighters		
2017–2021	Mighty Gunners		
2021–2022	Costa do Sol		
2022–2025	Chippa United	35	(4)
2025–	AmaZulu	14	(4)

International career^{‡}
2019–	Namibia	30	(10)
- * Club domestic league appearances and goals as of 4 January 2026 ‡ National team caps and goals as of 19 November 2024

Wazza Elmo Kambindu (born 26 May 1993) is a Namibian professional footballer who plays as a forward for South African Premier Division club AmaZulu and the Namibia national team.

== International statistics ==
As of 19 November 2024

Appearances and goals by year
Year	Apps	Goals
2019	6	4
2020	3	1
2021	13	4
2022	1	0
2023	5	1
2024	2	0
Total	30	10

Scores and results list Namibia's goal tally first, score column indicates score after each Kambindu goal.

List of international goals scored by Elmo Kambindu
No.	Date	Venue	Opponent	Score	Result	Competition	Ref.
1	26 July 2019	Stade de Moroni, Moroni, Comoros	Comoros	1–0	2–0	2020 African Nations Championship qualification	
2	26 July 2019	Stade de Moroni, Moroni, Comoros	Comoros	2–0	2–0	2020 African Nations Championship qualification	
3	19 October 2019	Sam Nujoma Stadium, Windhoek, Namibia	Madagascar	1–0	2–0	2020 African Nations Championship qualification	
4	19 October 2019	Sam Nujoma Stadium, Windhoek, Namibia	Madagascar	2–0	2–0	2020 African Nations Championship qualification	
5	17 November 2020	Sam Nujoma Stadium, Windhoek, Namibia	Mali	1–2	1–2	2021 Africa Cup of Nations qualification	
6	7 July 2021	Wolfson Stadium, Port Elizabeth, South Africa	Senegal	2–1	2–1	2021 COSAFA Cup	
7	11 July 2021	Nelson Mandela Bay Stadium, Port Elizabeth, South Africa	Zimbabwe	2–0	2–0	2021 COSAFA Cup	
8	13 July 2021	Wolfson Stadium, Port Elizabeth, South Africa	Malawi	1–1	1–1	2021 COSAFA Cup	
9	5 September 2021	Stade de Kégué, Lomé, Togo	Togo	1–0	1–0	2022 FIFA World Cup qualification	
10	5 July 2023	King Zwelithini Stadium, Durban, South Africa	South Africa	1–1	1–1	2023 COSAFA Cup group stage	
