= Daniel Liberal =

Angolan footballer (born 2000)

Personal information
- Full name: Daniel e Cruz Liberal
- Date of birth: 22 April 2000 (age 26)
- Place of birth: Vila Nova de Gaia, Portugal
- Height: 1.80 m (5 ft 11 in)
- Position: Right-back

Team information
- Current team: Anadia
- Number: 12

Youth career
- 2010–2013: Vilanovense
- 2013–2014: Boavista
- 2014–2016: Sporting CP
- 2016–2019: Chievo
- 2019: Fermana

Senior career*
Years	Team	Apps	(Gls)
2020–2024	Trofense	84	(4)
2024–	Anadia	22	(1)

International career^{‡}
2019	Angola U19	2	(0)
2021–	Angola	1	(0)
- * Club domestic league appearances and goals as of 15 June 2025 ‡ National team caps and goals as of 00:14, 17 November 2021 (UTC)

Daniel e Cruz Liberal (born 22 April 2000) is a professional footballer who plays as right-back for Anadia. Born in Portugal, he represents the Angola national team.

== Professional career ==
Liberal began his senior career with Trofense, and helped them win the 2020–21 Campeonato de Portugal and earn promotion to the Liga Portugal 2. He made his professional debut with Trofense in a 2–2 Liga Portugal 2 tie with Porto B on 7 August 2021.

== International career ==
Born in Portugal, Liberal is of Angolan descent. He is a youth international for Angola. He debuted with the Angola national team in a 1–1 2022 FIFA World Cup qualification tie with Libya on 16 November 2021.

== Honours ==
Trofense

- Campeonato de Portugal: 2020–21
