= Thabang Sibanyoni =

South African soccer player

Personal information
- Date of birth: 8 January 1996 (age 30)
- Height: 1.65 m (5 ft 5 in)
- Position: Forward

Team information
- Current team: AmaTuks (on loan from Mamelodi Sundowns)
- Number: 36

Senior career*
Years	Team	Apps	(Gls)
2019–	Mamelodi Sundowns	0	(0)
2019–2020	→ JDR Stars (loan)	11	(4)
2020–2021	→ Sekhukhune United (loan)	31	(6)
2022	→ AmaTuks (loan)	13	(5)
2022–2023	→ Supersport United (loan)	13	(1)
2023–	→ AmaTuks (loan)	17	(4)

International career^{‡}
2021–	South Africa	9	(2)
- * Club domestic league appearances and goals as of 18:55, 26 December 2023 (UTC) ‡ National team caps and goals as of 2 July 2024

Thabang Sibanyoni (born 8 January 1996) is a South African soccer player who plays as a forward for AmaTuks, on loan from Mamelodi Sundowns in the Premier Soccer League.

Contracted by Mamelodi Sundowns, his career saw him loaned out to multiple clubs. His loan spell at Sekhukhune United started in late 2020 and lasted until the first half of the 2021-22 South African Premier Division. Sibanyoni was called up for South Africa for the 2021 COSAFA Cup, playing 6 games in the tournament and scoring against Eswatini. South Africa won the cup.

Still not needed by the Sundowns, he was loaned out to AmaTuks for the second half of the 2021–22 season. Signed by Supersport United on a one-year loan in the summer of 2022, his playing style was described as a "classic No 9". Ahead of the 2023–24 season, Sibanyoni re-joined AmaTuks on a one-season loan.
