= Blessing Sarupinda =

Zimbabwean footballer (born 1999)

Personal information
- Full name: Blessing Tinotenda Sarupinda
- Date of birth: 4 May 1999 (age 27)
- Place of birth: Mutare, Zimbabwe
- Position: Midfielder

Team information
- Current team: CAPS United (on loan from Sekhukhune United)

Youth career
- Aces Soccer Academy

Senior career*
Years	Team	Apps	(Gls)
2018	Black Rhinos		
2019–2021	CAPS United		
2021–	Sekhukhune United	4	(0)
2022	→ JDR Stars (loan)	4	(0)
2022–	→ CAPS United (loan)		

International career^{‡}
2021–	Zimbabwe	5	(1)
- * Club domestic league appearances and goals ‡ National team caps and goals as of 30 October 2022

Blessing Sarupinda (born 4 May 1999) is a Zimbabwean footballer who plays for CAPS United on loan from Sekhukhune United, and the Zimbabwe national team.

== Club career ==
Sarupinda played for Aces Soccer Academy as a youth. He played for Black Rhinos F.C. of the Zimbabwe Premier Soccer League in 2018 before moving to fellow Premier League side CAPS United in 2019.

In February 2021 it was reported by local media that Sarupinda was close to a move to Europe and was in negotiations with S.C. Olhanense. He was ultimately not signed because a lack of fitness. He had impressed the club during a trial the previous year but the move was postponed because of the COVID-19 pandemic. When Sarupinda returned home in March 2020 and again in 2021 he re-joined CAPS United.

Later in 2021 Sarupinda eventually signed for Sekhukhune United of the South African Premier Division ahead of the 2021–22 season. By January 2022 he had made just four appearances for the club. It was announced at this time that he would be joining JDR Stars F.C. of the GladAfrica Championship on loan for the remainder of the season.

In the summer of 2022 he was loaned to his old club CAPS United.

== International career ==
Sarupinda made his senior international debut on 7 July 2021 in the team's opening match of the 2021 COSAFA Cup against Mozambique. Two days later, he scored his for international goal for Zimbabwe in a 2–2 draw with Malawi.

=== International goals ===
Scores and results list Zimbabwe's goal tally first.

#	Date	Venue	Opponent	Score	Result	Competition
1.	9 July 2021	Wolfson Stadium, Port Elizabeth, South Africa	Malawi	1–2	2–2	2021 COSAFA Cup

=== International career statistics ===
As of match played 11 November 2021.

Zimbabwe national team
Year	Apps	Goals
2021	5	1
Total	5	1
