= Absalom Iimbondi =

Namibian footballer (born 1991)

Personal information
- Full name: Absalom Manyana Kamutyasha Iimbondi
- Date of birth: 11 October 1991 (age 35)
- Place of birth: Ongwediva, Namibia
- Height: 1.70 m (5 ft 7 in)
- Position: Forward

Team information
- Current team: United Africa Tigers

Senior career*
Years	Team	Apps	(Gls)
2009–2011	Oshakati City		
2011–2016	United Africa Tigers		
2016–2017	Mochudi Centre Chiefs		
2017–	United Africa Tigers		

International career^{‡}
2015–	Namibia	60	(7)
- * Club domestic league appearances and goals ‡ National team caps and goals as of 27 January 2024

Absalom Manyana Kamutyasha Iimbondi (born 11 October 1991) is a Namibian football player. Some sources list his last name as Limbondi. He plays for United Africa Tigers.

== International ==
He made his Namibia national football team debut on 4 July 2015 in a CHAN 2016 qualifier against Zambia.

He was selected for the 2019 Africa Cup of Nations squad.

=== International goals ===
Scores and results list Namibia's goal tally first.

No	Date	Venue	Opponent	Score	Result	Competition
1.	22 January 2018	Stade Mohamed V, Casablanca, Morocco	Zambia	1–0	1–1	2018 African Nations Championship
2.	26 May 2019	King Zwelithini Stadium, Umlazi, South Africa	Mozambique	2–1	2–1	2019 COSAFA Cup
3.	10 September 2019	Sam Nujoma Stadium, Windhoek, Namibia	Eritrea	1–0	2–0	2022 FIFA World Cup qualification
4.	8 October 2020	Royal Bafokeng Stadium, Rustenburg, South Africa	South Africa	1–1	1–1	Friendly
5.	12 July 2022	King Zwelithini Stadium, Umlazi, South Africa	Madagascar	2–0	2–0	2022 COSAFA Cup
6.	28 March 2023	Dobsonville Stadium, Johannesburg, South Africa	Cameroon	2–0	2–1	2023 Africa Cup of Narions
7.	8 July 2023	King Zwelithini Stadium, Umlazi, South Africa	Eswatini	1–0	1–2	2023 COSAFA Cup
