= Rowan Human =

South African soccer player

Personal information
- Full name: Rowan Lancaster Human
- Date of birth: 21 January 2001 (age 25)
- Place of birth: Bethlehem, Free State, South Africa
- Height: 1.71 m (5 ft 7 in)
- Position: Midfielder

Team information
- Current team: Partizani
- Number: 18

Youth career
- 2014–2020: Bidvest Wits

Senior career*
Years	Team	Apps	(Gls)
2019–2020	Bidvest Wits	10	(2)
2020–2021	Maccabi Tel Aviv	0	(0)
2020–2021	→ Beitar Tel Aviv Bat Yam (loan)	25	(5)
2021–2023	Maritzburg United	46	(10)
2023–2025	AmaZulu	36	(3)
2025–	Partizani	31	(3)

International career^{‡}
2021	South Africa Olympic	2	(0)
2022–	South Africa	8	(1)
- * Club domestic league appearances and goals as of 13 May 2026 ‡ National team caps and goals as of 25 October 2023

Rowan Lancaster Human (born 21 January 2001) is a South African professional soccer player who plays as a midfielder for Albanian Kategoria Superiore club Partizani.

== Early life ==
Rowan Lancaster Human was born in Bethlehem, Free State on 21 January 2001.

== Club career ==
=== Bidvest Wits ===
In November 2019, Human made his ABSA Premiership League debut against Kaizer Chiefs in a 0-0 draw. Human scored his first goal for Bidvest Wits in February against Tuks. He was forced to leave Bidvest Wits on 8 August 2020 because Bidvest Wits was sold to a Limpopo team.

=== Maccabi Tel Aviv F.C. ===
In 2020, Human signed for Israeli top-flight side Maccabi Tel Aviv on a one-year contract, but was sent on loan to Israeli second division side Beitar Tel Aviv.

=== Maritzburg United F.C. ===
Human returned to South Africa in 2021 and joined Maritzburg on a two-year contract.

=== AmaZulu F.C. ===
Human signed for AmaZulu after the end of a contract in Maritzburg.

== International career ==
=== Youth ===
In July 2020, Human was called up to the South Africa U23s for the Summer Olympics.

=== Senior ===
Human was named in the 26 final squad for 2022 COSAFA Cup matches by coach Hugo Broos,. Human was named again in the 26 final squad for 2023 COSAFA Cup, where he scored his first international goal against Namibia in a 1-1 draw on 5 July 2023.
