= Victor Letsoalo =

South African soccer player

Personal information
- Full name: Sepana Victor Letsoalo
- Date of birth: 1 April 1993 (age 33)
- Place of birth: Limpopo polokwane, South Africa
- Height: 1.76 m (5 ft 9 in)
- Position: Forward

Team information
- Current team: TS Galaxy
- Number: 17

Senior career*
Years	Team	Apps	(Gls)
2013–2017	Baroka	62	(18)
2017–2021	Bloemfontein Celtic	92	(22)
2021–2022	Royal AM	27	(15)
2022–2023	Sekhukhune United	27	(4)
2023–2024	AmaZulu	19	(2)
2024–	TS Galaxy	28	(5)

International career^{‡}
2021–	South Africa	11	(4)
- * Club domestic league appearances and goals as of 4 January 2026 ‡ National team caps and goals as of 7 July 2023

Sepana Victor Letsoalo (born 1 April 1993) is a South African soccer player who plays as a forward for South African Premier Division side TS Galaxy and South African national team.

== Club career ==
Born in Limpopo polokwane Gathaba , Letsoalo signed for Bloemfontein Celtic from Baroka in 2017.

He moved on to AmaZulu in the summer of 2023.

== International career ==
He made his debut for South Africa national soccer team on 13 July 2021 in a 2021 COSAFA Cup game against Lesotho and scored a hat-trick in a 4–0 victory, becoming the first South African player to score three times on his national team debut. He scored one more goal in the semi-final against Mozambique as South Africa won the tournament and he became the top goal scorer with 4 goals.

== International goals ==
South Africa score listed first, score column indicates score after each Letsoalo goal.

International goals scored by Victor Letsoalo
No.	Date	Venue	Opponent	Score	Result	Competition	Ref(s)
1	13 July 2021	Nelson Mandela Bay Stadium, Port Elizabeth, South Africa	Lesotho	1–0	4–0	2021 COSAFA Cup	
2	13 July 2021	Nelson Mandela Bay Stadium, Port Elizabeth, South Africa	Lesotho	3–0	4–0	2021 COSAFA Cup	
3	13 July 2021	Nelson Mandela Bay Stadium, Port Elizabeth, South Africa	Lesotho	4–0	4–0	2021 COSAFA Cup	
4	16 July 2021	Nelson Mandela Bay Stadium, Port Elizabeth, South Africa	Mozambique	3–0	3–0	2021 COSAFA Cup	

== Honours ==
Baroka

- National First Division: 2015–16
