= Andrew Mbeba =

Zimbabwean footballer (born 2000)

Personal information
- Full name: Andrew Kabila Mbeba
- Date of birth: 19 February 2000 (age 26)
- Position: Defender

Team information
- Current team: Highlanders
- Number: 18

Youth career
- –2018: Highlanders

Senior career*
Years	Team	Apps	(Gls)
2018–	Highlanders		

International career
2018	Zimbabwe U20		
2021–	Zimbabwe	1	(0)
- * Club domestic league appearances and goals

Andrew Kabila Mbeba (born 19 February 2000) is a Zimbabwean footballer who plays as a defender for Highlanders, and the Zimbabwe national football team. He has also played for the national under-20 squad.

== Club career ==
Mbeba is a product of the Highlanders academy, and won the Zimbabwe Premier Soccer League's Rookie of the Year award for the 2019 season.

== International career ==
Having captained the Zimbabwe national under-20 team at the 2018 COSAFA U-20 Cup in which they finished as runners-up, Mbeba made his senior international debut on 24 January 2021 in a 1–0 defeat to Mali in the 2020 African Nations Championship.

== Honours ==
Zimbabwe U20

- COSAFA U-20 Cup: 2018
