= Charles Bwale =

Zambian footballer (born 1976)

Personal information
- Date of birth: 29 July 1976 (age 50)
- Position: Defender

International career
| Years | Team | Apps | (Gls) |
| 2000–2003 | Zambia | 9 | (0) |

Managerial career
- 2020–: Konkola Blades

Charles Bwale (born 29 July 1976) is a Zambian football coach and former player who coaches Konkola Blades. A defender, he played in nine matches for the Zambia national team from 2000 to 2003. He was also named in Zambia's squad for the 2002 African Cup of Nations tournament. Bwale was appointed coach of Konkola Blades in late 2020.
