= Moussa Ndiaye (footballer, born 1999) =

Senegalese footballer

Personal information
- Date of birth: 30 September 1999 (age 27)
- Place of birth: Dakar, Senegal
- Height: 1.82 m (6 ft 0 in)
- Position: Midfielder

Team information
- Current team: Asti

Youth career
- 2015–2017: Juventus
- 2017–: Cesena

Senior career*
Years	Team	Apps	(Gls)
2018	Cesena	1	(0)
2018–2019	Pescara	0	(0)
2018–2019	→ Fano (loan)	23	(0)
2019–2020	Rende	13	(0)
2020–2021	Marignanese Cattolica	11	(0)
2022-	Acqui	9	(2)
- * Club domestic league appearances and goals as of 6 March 2022

Moussa Ndiaye (born 30 September 1999) is a Senegalese footballer who plays as a midfielder for Serie D club Asti.

== Club career ==
He made his Serie B debut for Cesena on 3 March 2018 in a game against Spezia.

On 2 September 2019, he moved from Pescara to Rende.
