= Shaquille (footballer) =

Mozambican footballer (born 1997)

Personal information
- Full name: Shaquille Momad da Conceição Nangy
- Date of birth: 24 November 1997 (age 28)
- Place of birth: Inhambane, Mozambique
- Height: 1.81 m (5 ft 11 in)
- Position: Midfielder

Team information
- Current team: Sagrada Esperança

Senior career*
Years	Team	Apps	(Gls)
2014–2015	Clube Ferroviário de Inhambane		
2016–2024	Ferroviário Maputo		
2024–	Sagrada Esperança	13	(1)

International career^{‡}
2021–	Mozambique	42	(0)
- * Club domestic league appearances and goals as of 1 July 2024 ‡ National team caps and goals as of 12:04, 22 August 2025 (UTC)

Shaquille Momad da Conceição Nangy (born 24 November 1997), simply known as Shaquille, is a Mozambican professional footballer who plays as a midfielder for Angolan club Sagrada Esperança and the Mozambique national team.

== Style of play ==
Shaquille plays as a holding midfielder, utilising his vision, versatility and tactical acumen to control the midfield and provide defensive stability. His ability to read the game, make interceptions and distribute the ball effectively make him an essential asset in both defensive and transitional phases of play.
