= 2023 COSAFA Cup =

22nd edition of the COSAFA Cup

Tournament details
- Host country: South Africa
- City: Durban
- Dates: 5–16 July 2023
- Teams: 12 (from 1 confederation)
- Venues: 3 (in 3 host cities)

Final positions
- Champions: Zambia (7th title)
- Runners-up: Lesotho
- Third place: South Africa
- Fourth place: Malawi

Tournament statistics
- Matches played: 22
- Goals scored: 48 (2.18 per match)
- Top scorer(s): (South Africa) Tshegofatso Mabasa (Zambia) Albert Kangwanda (3 goals each)

The 2023 COSAFA Cup was the 22nd edition of the annual association football competition organized by COSAFA. It was held in South Africa for the sixth straight year, this time in Durban, from 5 to 16 July 2023. Zambia were the defending champions.

== Participating nations ==
| National team | FIFA Ranking (31 March 2023) | Best Performance |
|---|---|---|
| Eswatini | 144 | Semi-finals (1999, 2002, 2003, 2021) |
| Mauritius | 180 | Quarter-finals (2001, 2004) |
| Comoros | 131 | Group stage |
| Lesotho | 150 | Runners-up (2000) |
| Botswana | 152 | Runners-up (2016, 2019) |
| Malawi | 127 | Runners-up (2002, 2003) |
| Zambia | 86 | Champions (1997, 1998, 2006, 2013, 2019, 2022) |
| Mozambique | 119 | Runners-up (2008, 2015) |
| Namibia | 106 | Champions (2015) |
| South Africa | 66 | Champions (2002, 2007, 2008, 2016, 2021) |
| Angola | 118 | Champions (1999, 2001, 2004) |
| Seychelles | 197 | Group stage |

== Format ==
For the first time, all participants will enter the Group Stage for three groups of four nations. The winners of each group and best runner-up will advance to the knockout stages. The new format guarantees between three and five matches for each team. No plate competitions will be held in this edition of the tournament.

== Venues ==
2023 COSAFA Cup is located in South Africa
| 2023 COSAFA Cup is located in South Africa | Umlazi | KwaMashu | Durban | |
|---|---|---|---|---|
| 2023 COSAFA Cup is located in South Africa | King Zwelithini Stadium | Princess Magogo Stadium | Chatsworth Stadium | Moses Mabhida Stadium |
| 2023 COSAFA Cup is located in South Africa | Capacity: 10,000 | Capacity: 12,000 | Capacity: 22,000 | Capacity: 85,000 |

== Draw ==
The draw for the group stage of the 2023 COSAFA Cup was held on 26 May 2023 in Johannesburg.

== Group stage ==
Group stage matches will be played between 5–12 July 2023.

=== Group A ===
| Pos | Team | Pld | W | D | L | GF | GA | GD | Pts | Qualification |
|---|---|---|---|---|---|---|---|---|---|---|
| 1 | South Africa | 3 | 2 | 1 | 0 | 5 | 3 | +2 | 7 | Advance to knockout stage |
| 2 | Botswana | 3 | 1 | 1 | 1 | 2 | 2 | 0 | 4 | |
| 3 | Eswatini | 3 | 1 | 0 | 2 | 3 | 4 | −1 | 3 | |
| 4 | Namibia | 3 | 0 | 2 | 1 | 2 | 3 | −1 | 2 | |

Source: COSAFA
Rules for classification: Group stage tiebreakers
5 July 2023
15:00

| Eswatini | 0–1 | Botswana |
|---|---|---|
| | Report | Ditsele 23' |

King Zwelithini Stadium, Durban
5 July 2023
18:00

| South Africa | 1–1 | Namibia |
|---|---|---|
| Human 48' | Report | Kambindu 43' |

King Zwelithini Stadium, Durban

8 July 2023
15:00

| South Africa | 2–1 | Botswana |
|---|---|---|
| Rayners 66' (pen.); Mogaila 68' | Report | Kgamanyane 63' |

King Zwelithini Stadium, Durban
8 July 2023
18:00

| Namibia | 1–2 | Eswatini |
|---|---|---|
| Limbondi 34' | Report | Matse 41'; Matsebula 44' |

King Zwelithini Stadium, Durban

11 July 2023
18:00

| Namibia | 0–0 | Botswana |
|---|---|---|
| | Report |

Moses Mabhida Stadium, Durban
11 July 2023
18:00

| South Africa | 2–1 | Eswatini |
|---|---|---|
| Mabasa 76', 88' | Report | Matsebula 51' |

Princess Magogo Stadium, KwaMashu

=== Group B ===
| Pos | Team | Pld | W | D | L | GF | GA | GD | Pts | Qualification |
|---|---|---|---|---|---|---|---|---|---|---|
| 1 | Malawi | 3 | 3 | 0 | 0 | 5 | 0 | +5 | 9 | Advance to knockout stage |
| 2 | Zambia | 3 | 2 | 0 | 1 | 6 | 4 | +2 | 6 | Advance to knockout stage based on ranking |
| 3 | Comoros | 3 | 1 | 0 | 2 | 4 | 4 | 0 | 3 | |
| 4 | Seychelles | 3 | 0 | 0 | 3 | 2 | 9 | −7 | 0 | |

Source: COSAFA
Rules for classification: Group stage tiebreakers
6 July 2023
15:00

| Seychelles | 0–3 | Comoros |
|---|---|---|
| | Report | Djambae 27'; Djoudja 39'; Bacar 59' |

King Zwelithini Stadium, Durban
6 July 2023
18:00

| Zambia | 0–1 | Malawi |
|---|---|---|
| | Report | Katebe 17' (o.g.) |

King Zwelithini Stadium, Durban

9 July 2023
15:00

| Zambia | 2–1 | Comoros |
|---|---|---|
| Mulambia 51'; Kangwanda 74' | Report | Djambae 67' |

King Zwelithini Stadium, Durban
9 July 2023
18:00

| Malawi | 2–0 | Seychelles |
|---|---|---|
| Nkhoma 55'; Jacama Kumwembe 65' | Report |

King Zwelithini Stadium, Durban

11 July 2023
15:00

| Malawi | 2–0 | Comoros |
|---|---|---|
| Kaonga 30' (pen.); Mwaungulu 36' | Report |

Moses Mabhida Stadium, Durban
11 July 2023
15:00

| Seychelles | 2–4 | Zambia |
|---|---|---|
| Labrosse 81'; Mellie 90' (pen.) | Report | Kangwanda 11'; Kanguluma 54'; Mashata 58'; Mulambia 73' |

Princess Magogo Stadium, KwaMashu

=== Group C ===
| Pos | Team | Pld | W | D | L | GF | GA | GD | Pts | Qualification |
|---|---|---|---|---|---|---|---|---|---|---|
| 1 | Lesotho | 3 | 2 | 0 | 1 | 5 | 4 | +1 | 6 | Advance to knockout stage |
| 2 | Angola | 3 | 1 | 1 | 1 | 5 | 4 | +1 | 4 | |
| 3 | Mozambique | 3 | 1 | 1 | 1 | 2 | 2 | 0 | 4 | |
| 4 | Mauritius | 3 | 1 | 0 | 2 | 1 | 3 | −2 | 3 | |

Source: COSAFA
Rules for classification: Group stage tiebreakers
7 July 2023
15:00

| Mauritius | 0–2 | Lesotho |
|---|---|---|
| | Report | Mokhachane 15'; Sera 90+2' |

King Zwelithini Stadium, Durban
7 July 2023
18:00

| Mozambique | 1–1 | Angola |
|---|---|---|
| António 83' | Report | Benarfa 3' |

King Zwelithini Stadium, Durban

10 July 2023
15:00

| Angola | 0–1 | Mauritius |
|---|---|---|
| | Report | François 8' |

Princess Magogo Stadium, KwaMashu
10 July 2023
18:00

| Mozambique | 0–1 | Lesotho |
|---|---|---|
| | Report | Mokhachane 34' |

Princess Magogo Stadium, KwaMashu

12 July 2023
15:00

| Angola | 4–2 | Lesotho |
|---|---|---|
| Cangue 20'; Amor 29'; Goncalves 50'; Moseka 88' | Report | Makha 3'; Mokokoane 44' |

Moses Mabhida Stadium, Durban
12 July 2023
15:00

| Mauritius | 0–1 | Mozambique |
|---|---|---|
| | Report | Abudo 38' |

Princess Magogo Stadium, KwaMashu

=== Best Runner-up Table ===
| Pos | Grp | Team | Pld | W | T | L | GF | GA | GD | Pts | Qualification |
|---|---|---|---|---|---|---|---|---|---|---|---|
| 1 | B | Zambia | 3 | 2 | 0 | 1 | 6 | 4 | +2 | 6 | Advance to knockout stage |
| 2 | C | Angola | 3 | 1 | 1 | 1 | 5 | 4 | +1 | 4 | |
| 3 | A | Botswana | 3 | 1 | 1 | 1 | 2 | 2 | 0 | 4 | |

Source: COSAFA
Rules for classification: Group stage tiebreakers

== Knockout stage ==
Semi-final matches where played on the 14 July 2023. The final and third-place matches where played two days later at the King Zwelithini Stadium.

=== Bracket ===
Semi-Finals
14 Jul – Durban
Malawi | 1(0)
Lesotho (p) | 1(3)
14 Jul – Durban
South Africa | 1
Zambia | 2

Final
16 Jul – Durban
Lesotho | 0
Zambia | 1
Third-Place
16 Jul - Durban
Malawi | 0(3)
South Africa(p) | 0(5)

=== Semi-finals ===
14 July 2023
15:00

| Malawi | 1–1 | Lesotho |
|---|---|---|
| Kaonga 26' (pen.) | Report | Thaba-Ntso 18' |
Penalties
| | 0–3 |

King Zwelithini Stadium, Durban
14 July 2023
18:00

| South Africa | 1–2 | Zambia |
|---|---|---|
| Mabasa 44' | Report | Mashata 50'; Kangwanda 69' |

King Zwelithini Stadium, Durban

=== Third-place ===
16 July 2023
15:00

| Malawi | 0–0 | South Africa |
|---|---|---|
| | Report |
Penalties
| | 3–5 |

King Zwelithini Stadium, Durban

=== Final ===
16 July 2023
18:00

| Lesotho | 0–1 | Zambia |
|---|---|---|
| | Report | Libamba 78' |

King Zwelithini Stadium, Durban

== Statistics ==
=== Goalscorers ===
There were 48 goals scored in 22 matches, for an average of 2.18 goals per match.

3 goals

- (South Africa) Tshegofatso Mabasa
- (Zambia) Albert Kangwanda

2 goals

- (Comoros) Affane Djambae
- (Eswatini) Bongwa Matsebula
- (Lesotho) Neo Mokhachane
- (Malawi) Chawanangwa Kaonga
- (Zambia) Golden Mashata
- (Zambia) Fredrick Mulambia

1 goal

- (Angola) Moisés Amor
- (Angola) Mankoka Afonso
- (Angola) Cesar Cangue
- (Angola) Emanuel Goncalves
- (Angola) Osvaldo Moseka
- (Botswana) Lebogang Ditsele
- (Botswana) Thatayaone Kgamanyane
- (Comoros) Raidou Bacar
- (Comoros) Ibroihim Djoudja
- (Eswatini) Sifiso Matse
- (Lesotho) Tumelo Makha
- (Lesotho) Rethabile Mokokoane
- (Lesotho) Motebang Sera
- (Mauritius) Marie Matthieu Aurélien François
- (Malawi) Christopher Jacama Kumwembe
- (Malawi) Patrick Mwaungulu
- (Malawi) Lanjesi Nkhoma
- (Mozambique) Dayo António
- (Mozambique) Ali Abudo
- (Namibia) Elmo Kambindu
- (Namibia) Absalom Iimbondi
- (Seychelles) Brandon Labrosse
- (Seychelles) Warren Mellie
- (South Africa) Rowan Human
- (South Africa) Shaune Mogaila
- (South Africa) Iqraam Rayners
- (Zambia) Killian Kanguluma
- (Zambia) Moyela Libamba

1 own goal

- (Zambia) Aaron Katebe (against Malawi)
