= Veli Mothwa =

South African soccer player

Personal information
- Date of birth: 12 February 1991 (age 35)
- Place of birth: Zebediela, South Africa
- Height: 1.80 m (5 ft 11 in)
- Position: Goalkeeper

Team information
- Current team: AmaZulu
- Number: 44

Senior career*
Years	Team	Apps	(Gls)
2013–2016	Baroka	26	(0)
2016–2020	Chippa United	24	(0)
2020–	AmaZulu	97	(0)

International career^{‡}
2021–	South Africa	10	(0)
- * Club domestic league appearances and goals as of 1 August 2024 ‡ National team caps and goals as of 27 March 2024

Veli Mothwa (born 12 February 1991) is a South African soccer player who plays as a goalkeeper for South African Premier Division side AmaZulu and the South African national team.

== International career ==
Mothwa received his first senior national team call-up in March 2021 for South Africa's 2021 Africa Cup of Nations qualifying matches against Sudan and Ghana, although he did not feature in either fixture. Four months later, he was named in the squad for the 2021 COSAFA Cup, where he made his international debut in the opening Group A match against Botswana, keeping a clean sheet in a 1–0 victory. He subsequently established himself as the starting goalkeeper for the remainder of the tournament, keeping five consecutive clean sheets, including in the final against Senegal. He later spent the 2023 Africa Cup of Nations qualifying campaign as backup to Ronwen Williams. Hugo Broos subsequently selected him for the final tournament, where he wore the number 22 shirt as the third-choice goalkeeper. He did not play as South Africa progressed to the semi-finals for the first time in 24 years.

== Honours ==
South Africa

- Africa Cup of Nations third place: 2023
