= Princess Magogo Stadium =

Multi-purpose stadium in KwaMashu, South Africa

- Interactive map of Princess Magogo Stadium
- Address: Mkhiwane Road / Undlondlo Road, KwaMashu, KwaZulu-Natal, South Africa; Durban
- Location: KwaMashu, Durban, South Africa
- Coordinates: 29.744249°S 30.971264°E
- Owner: eThekwini Metropolitan Municipality
- Capacity: 12,000
- Surface: Grass

Construction
- Renovated: 2009
- Cost: R93 million (2009 refurbishment)

Tenant
- Milford

Princess Magogo Stadium is a multi-purpose stadium in KwaMashu, a township near Durban, South Africa. It is currently used mostly for football matches and was utilized as a training field for teams that participated in the 2010 FIFA World Cup after being renovated and upgraded in 2009 to meet FIFA specifications.

The stadium is named after Princess Constance Magogo, a Zulu princess who spent much of her life as a singer and composer while developing an understanding for Zulu tradition and culture.
