= King Zwelithini Stadium =

South African multi-purpose stadium

King Goodwill Zwelithini Stadium
- Interactive map of King Goodwill Zwelithini Stadium
- Location: off Griffiths Mxenge Highway, Umlazi, KwaZulu-Natal, South Africa
- Coordinates: 29°58′17″S 30°54′0″E
- Owner: Ethekwini Metropolitan Municipality
- Capacity: 10,000
- Surface: Grass

Construction
- Renovated: 2010
- Cost: R84 million (2009 refurbishment)

Tenant
- AmaZulu F.C.

King Zwelithini Stadium is a multi-purpose stadium in Umlazi, a township south-west of Durban, South Africa. It is used mostly for football matches and was initially set to be utilized as a training field for teams participating in the 2010 FIFA World Cup after being renovated in 2010 and brought up to FIFA standards. However, since the participating teams were residing in the north of Durban, it was decided that King Zwelithini Stadium was located too far away for practice sessions.

The stadium's capacity was expanded from 5,000 to 10,000 as a lasting legacy of the World Cup.

The stadium is named after the Zulu King Goodwill Zwelithini kaBhekuzulu.
