= 2025 U-20 Africa Cup of Nations qualification =

Tournament details
- Host countries: Egypt (North Zone); Liberia (West A Zone); Togo (West B Zone); Congo (Central Zone); Tanzania (Central-East Zone); Mozambique (South Zone)
- Dates: 15 September – 26 November 2024
- Teams: 48

Tournament statistics
- Matches played: 83
- Goals scored: 235 (2.83 per match)

The 2025 U-20 Africa Cup of Nations qualification was a men's under-20 football competition that decided the participating teams of the 2025 U-20 Africa Cup of Nations.

Players born on 1 January 2005 or later were eligible to participate in the competition. A total of twelve teams qualified to play in the final tournament.

== Teams ==
Zone	Spots	Teams entering qualification	Did not enter
North Zone (UNAF)	2 spots	Algeria; **Egypt**; Libya; **Morocco**; Tunisia	
West A Zone (WAFU-UFOA A)	2 spots	Gambia; Guinea; Guinea-Bissau; Liberia; Mali; ~~Mauritania~~ **(W)**; **Senegal**; **Sierra Leone**	Cape Verde
West B Zone (WAFU-UFOA B)	2 spots	Benin; Burkina Faso; **Ghana**; Ivory Coast; Niger; **Nigeria**; Togo	
Central Zone (UNIFFAC)	2 spots	Cameroon; **Central African Republic**; ~~Chad~~ **(W)**; ~~Congo~~ **(D)**; **DR Congo**; Equatorial Guinea; Gabon	São Tomé and Príncipe
Central-East Zone (CECAFA)	2 spots	Burundi; Djibouti; Ethiopia; **Kenya**; Rwanda; South Sudan; Sudan; **Tanzania**; Uganda	Eritrea; Somalia
South Zone (COSAFA)	2 spots	Angola; Botswana; Comoros; Eswatini; Lesotho; ~~Madagascar~~ **(W)**; Malawi; Mozambique; Namibia; **South Africa**; **Zambia**; Zimbabwe	Mauritius; Seychelles

Notes

- Teams in **bold** qualified for the final tournament.
- (D): Disqualified
- (W): Withdrew after draw

== North Zone ==
The 2024 UNAF U-20 Tournament, which also served as the qualifiers for the U-20 Africa Cup of Nations, took place between 14 and 26 November in Egypt. The five teams were placed in one group, with the winner and the runner-up qualifying for the final tournament.

All times are local, EST, CAT (UTC+2).

Pos	Team	Pld	W	D	L	GF	GA	GD	Pts	Qualification
1	Morocco	4	3	1	0	9	3	+6	10	2025 U-20 Africa Cup of Nations
2	Egypt (H)	4	2	1	1	5	4	+1	7	2025 U-20 Africa Cup of Nations
3	Tunisia	4	2	0	2	5	5	0	6	2025 U-20 Africa Cup of Nations
4	Algeria	4	1	2	1	7	4	+3	5	
5	Libya	4	0	0	4	2	12	−10	0	

Source: UNAF
Rules for classification: 1) Points; 2) Goal difference; 3) Goals scored
(H) Hosts
14 November 2024
17:00

Libya	1–2	Tunisia
Omar Al Harak 40'		Sadek Mahmoud 21'; Youssef Becha 87' (pen.)

Suez Canal Stadium, Ismailia
14 November 2024
20:00

Morocco	2–1	Egypt
Saad El Haddad 40'; Othmane Maamma 69'		Mahamed El Bana 50'

Suez Canal Stadium, Ismailia

17 November 2024
17:00

Tunisia	1–2	Morocco
Khalil Ayari 1'		Mouad Dahak 49'; Reda Laalaoui 72'

Suez Canal Stadium, Ismailia
17 November 2024
20:00

Algeria	1–1	Egypt
Ben Ahmed Kohili 86' (pen.)		Mohamed Zaalouk 57'

Suez Canal Stadium, Ismailia

20 November 2024
17:00

Libya	1–2	Egypt
Abdulaziz Mansour 77'		Ahmed Kabaka 75' (pen.); Abdallah Bostangy 90'

Suez Canal Stadium, Ismailia
20 November 2024
20:00

Algeria	1–1	Morocco
Mohamed Zeghadi 14'		Yassir Zabiri 86'

Suez Canal Stadium, Ismailia

23 November 2024
17:00

Tunisia	2–1	Algeria
Issam Abdelhamid Naïm 76' (o.g.); Amanallah Mehrezi 90+6'		Islam Abbes 81'

Suez Canal Stadium, Ismailia
23 November 2024
20:00

Morocco	4–0	Libya
Mouad Dahak 27' (pen.); Naoufel El Hannach 45+3'; Ayman Arguigue 53'; Saad El Haddad 72'

Suez Canal Stadium, Ismailia

26 November 2024
18:00

Algeria	4–0	Libya
Lahlou Akhrib 75', 80'; Oussama Benattia 78'; Mohamed Ramdaoui 84'

Ismailia Stadium, Ismailia
26 November 2024
18:00

Egypt	1–0	Tunisia
Fares Khaled (red card) 40'; Ahmed Kabaka 54'

Suez Canal Stadium, Ismailia

== West A Zone ==
The WAFU-UFOA Zone A qualifiers for the U-20 Africa Cup of Nations were hosted by Liberia with the matches played between 15 and 28 September 2024. The matches were played at Monrovia, Liberia.

=== Group stage ===
The eight teams were drawn into two groups of four teams. The winners and the runners-up of each group advanced to the semi-finals.

==== Group A ====
Pos	Team	Pld	W	D	L	GF	GA	GD	Pts	Qualification
1	Sierra Leone	3	2	1	0	4	1	+3	7	Semi-finals
2	Guinea	3	1	2	0	4	2	+2	5	Semi-finals
3	Liberia (H)	3	1	1	1	3	4	−1	4	
4	Guinea-Bissau	3	0	0	3	1	5	−4	0	

Source: CAF
(H) Hosts
15 September 2024
13:00

Liberia	1–0	Guinea-Bissau
Zohn 29'	Report

Samuel Kanyon Doe Sports Complex, Monrovia
15 September 2024
16:00

Guinea	0–0	Sierra Leone
	Report

Samuel Kanyon Doe Sports Complex, Monrovia

18 September 2024
13:00

Guinea-Bissau	1–3	Guinea
Baldé 57'	Report	Bangoura 42'; Youla 60'; Condé 78'

Samuel Kanyon Doe Sports Complex, Monrovia
18 September 2024
16:00

Sierra Leone	3–1	Liberia
Kamara 37', 68'; Fornah 50'	Report	Koroma 62'

Samuel Kanyon Doe Sports Complex, Monrovia

21 September 2024
16:00

Liberia	1–1	Guinea
Zubah 90+5'	Report	Camara 29'

Samuel Kanyon Doe Sports Complex, Monrovia
21 September 2024
16:00

Guinea-Bissau	0–1	Sierra Leone
	Report	Jalloh 45'

Antoinette Tubman Stadium, Monrovia

==== Group B ====
Pos	Team	Pld	W	D	L	GF	GA	GD	Pts	Qualification
1	Senegal	2	1	1	0	4	2	+2	4	Semi-finals
2	Gambia	2	0	2	0	2	2	0	2	Semi-finals
3	Mali	2	0	1	1	0	2	−2	1	
4	Mauritania	0	0	0	0	0	0	0	0	Withdrew

Source: CAF

Mauritania was also drawn into this group, but withdrew before playing.

16 September 2024
13:00

Senegal	2–0	Mali
Diouf 26'; Dia 63'	Report

Samuel Kanyon Doe Sports Complex, Monrovia

19 September 2024
16:00

Gambia	2–2	Senegal
Sillah 52'; Badjie 59'	Report	Thiam 42'; Dia 77'

Samuel Kanyon Doe Sports Complex, Monrovia

22 September 2024
16:00

Mali	0–0	Gambia
	Report

Samuel Kanyon Doe Sports Complex, Monrovia

=== Knockout stage ===
==== Bracket ====
Semi-finals
25 September – Monrovia
Sierra Leone	3
Gambia	0
25 September – Monrovia
Senegal	2
Guinea	0

Final
28 September – Monrovia
Sierra Leone	0
Senegal	2
Third place play-off
28 September – Monrovia
Gambia	3
Guinea	0

==== Semi-finals ====
Winners qualified for 2025 U-20 Africa Cup of Nations.

25 September 2024
13:00

Sierra Leone	3–0	Gambia
Sesay 6'; Ghandi 79'; Kamara 86'	Report

Samuel Kanyon Doe Sports Complex, Monrovia

25 September 2024
16:00

Senegal	2–0	Guinea
Diouf 88' (pen.); Thiam 90+3'	Report

Samuel Kanyon Doe Sports Complex, Monrovia

==== Third place play-off ====
28 September 2024
13:00

Gambia	3–0	Guinea
Wally 45'; Sillah 62'; Camara 82'

Samuel Kanyon Doe Sports Complex, Monrovia

==== Final ====
28 September 2024
16:00

Sierra Leone	0–2	Senegal
	Report	Thiam 13'; Dieng 24'

Samuel Kanyon Doe Sports Complex, Monrovia

== West B Zone ==
The WAFU-UFOA Zone B qualifiers for the U-20 Africa Cup of Nations were hosted by Togo with the matches played between 17 and 30 October 2024. The matches were played at Lomé, Togo. The draw was announced on 26 September 2024.

=== Group stage ===
The seven teams were drawn into two groups of three and four teams. The winners and the runners-up of each group advanced to the semi-finals.

==== Group A ====
Pos	Team	Pld	W	D	L	GF	GA	GD	Pts	Qualification
1	Ghana	3	1	2	0	5	3	+2	5	Semi-finals
2	Niger	3	1	1	1	3	4	−1	4	Semi-finals
3	Togo (H)	3	0	3	0	3	3	0	3	
4	Benin	3	0	2	1	2	3	−1	2	

Source: Zone Ouest B
(H) Hosts
17 October 2024
15:00

Togo	2–2	Niger
	Report

Stade de Kégué, Lomé
17 October 2024
19:00

Ghana	2–2	Benin
	Report

Stade de Kégué, Lomé

20 October 2024
15:00

Niger	0–2	Ghana
	Report

Stade Municipal, Lomé
20 October 2024
19:00

Benin	0–0	Togo
	Report

Stade de Kégué, Lomé

23 October 2024
15:00

Togo	1–1	Ghana
	Report

Stade Municipal, Lomé
23 October 2024
15:00

Niger	1–0	Benin
	Report

Stade de Kégué, Lomé

==== Group B ====
Pos	Team	Pld	W	D	L	GF	GA	GD	Pts	Qualification
1	Nigeria	2	1	0	1	2	2	0	3	Semi-finals
2	Ivory Coast	2	1	0	1	2	2	0	3	Semi-finals
3	Burkina Faso	2	1	0	1	1	1	0	3	

Source: Zone Ouest B
18 October 2024
15:00

Nigeria	0–1	Burkina Faso
	Report

Stade Municipal, Lomé

21 October 2024
15:00

Burkina Faso	0–1	Ivory Coast
	Report

Stade Municipal, Lomé

24 October 2024
15:00

Ivory Coast	1–2	Nigeria
	Report

Stade Municipal, Lomé

=== Knockout stage ===
==== Bracket ====
Semi-finals
27 October – Lomé
Ghana	2
Ivory Coast	1
27 October – Lomé
Nigeria	3
Niger	1

Final
30 October – Lomé
Ghana	1
Nigeria	2
Third place play-off
30 October – Lomé
Ivory Coast	2
Niger	1

==== Semi-finals ====
Winners qualified for 2025 U-20 Africa Cup of Nations.

27 October 2024
15:00

Ghana	2–1	Ivory Coast
	Report

Stade Municipal, Lomé

27 October 2024
19:00

Nigeria	3–1	Niger
	Report

Stade de Kégué, Lomé

==== Third place play-off ====
30 October 2024
15:00

Ivory Coast	2–1	Niger
	Report

Stade de Kégué, Lomé

==== Final ====
30 October 2024
19:00

Ghana	1–2	Nigeria
	Report

Stade de Kégué, Lomé

== Central Zone ==
The UNIFFAC qualifiers for the U-20 Africa Cup of Nations were hosted by Congo with the matches played between 24 September and 3 October 2024. The matches were played at Brazzaville, Congo.

=== Group stage ===
The seven teams were drawn into two groups of four and three teams. The winners and the runners-up of each group advanced to the semi-finals.

==== Group A ====
Pos	Team	Pld	W	D	L	GF	GA	GD	Pts	Qualification
1	Congo (H)	2	2	0	0	3	0	+3	6	Semi-finals
2	DR Congo	2	1	0	1	3	2	+1	3	Semi-finals
3	Equatorial Guinea	2	0	0	2	1	5	−4	0	
4	Chad (W)	0	0	0	0	0	0	0	0	Withdrew

Source: CAF
(H) Hosts; (W) Withdrew

Chad was also drawn into this group, but withdrew before playing.

24 September 2024
14:00

Congo	1–0	DR Congo
Moussavou 28'	Report

Alphonse Massemba-Débat Stadium, Brazzaville

26 September 2024
17:00

Equatorial Guinea	0–2	Congo
	Report	Lendambi 57', 75'

Alphonse Massemba-Débat Stadium, Brazzaville

28 September 2024
17:00

DR Congo	3–1	Equatorial Guinea
Mavutuku 45+3'; Talasi 52'; Matobo 84' (pen.)	Report	Eworo 19' (pen.)

Alphonse Massemba-Débat Stadium, Brazzaville

==== Group B ====
Pos	Team	Pld	W	D	L	GF	GA	GD	Pts	Qualification
1	Cameroon	2	2	0	0	7	1	+6	6	Semi-finals
2	Central African Republic	2	1	0	1	2	5	−3	3	Semi-finals
3	Gabon	2	0	0	2	2	5	−3	0	

Source: CAF
24 September 2024
15:00

Central African Republic	2–1	Gabon
Kondja 44'; Mbaigoto 63'	Report	Mbélé 58'

Alphonse Massemba-Débat Stadium, Brazzaville

26 September 2024
15:00

Cameroon	4–0	Central African Republic
Douala 9'; Nana 49'; Djibrin 65'; Essounga 87'	Report

Alphonse Massemba-Débat Stadium, Brazzaville

28 September 2024
15:00

Gabon	1–3	Cameroon
Makon 48' (o.g.)	Report	Makon 12'; Mfoumou 46'; Djibrin 88'

Alphonse Massemba-Débat Stadium, Brazzaville

=== Knockout stage ===
==== Bracket ====
Semi-finals
1 October –
Congo	2
Central African Republic	0
1 October -
Cameroon	1 (3)
DR Congo (p)	1 (4)

Final
3 October –
Congo	1
DR Congo	2

==== Semi-finals ====
Winners qualified for 2025 U-20 Africa Cup of Nations.

1 October 2024
15:00

Congo	2–0	Central African Republic
Prince 47'; Ledambi 90'

1 October 2024
18:00

Cameroon	1–1	DR Congo
Yondjo 35' (pen.)		Talasi 7'
Penalties
	3–4

==== Final ====
3 October 2024
17:00

Congo	1–2	DR Congo
Ledambi 90'		Talasi 6', 53'

== Central-East Zone ==
The CECAFA qualifiers for the U-20 Africa Cup of Nations were hosted by Tanzania between 6 and 20 October 2024.

All times are local, EAT (UTC+3).

=== Group stage ===
The nine teams were drawn into two groups of four and five teams. The winners and the runners-up of each group advanced to the semi-finals.

==== Group A ====
Pos	Team	Pld	W	D	L	GF	GA	GD	Pts	Qualification
1	Kenya	4	3	1	0	10	1	+9	10	Semi-finals
2	Tanzania (H)	4	3	0	1	12	2	+10	9	Semi-finals
3	Sudan	4	2	0	2	4	6	−2	6	
4	Rwanda	4	1	1	2	5	5	0	4	
5	Djibouti	4	0	0	4	2	19	−17	0	

Source: CECAFA
(H) Hosts
6 October 2024
16:00

Tanzania	1–2	Kenya
Mkinyange 77'		Wanganya 26'; Omondi 67'

6 October 2024
18:00

Sudan	3–1	Djibouti
Khmies 3'; Musa 62'; Shamselden 73'		Daher 54'

8 October 2024
16:00

Tanzania	7–0	Djibouti
Mashaka 21', 76', 90+6' (pen.); Kondo 58', 90+1'; Jimmy 62'; Mosha 70'

8 October 2024
18:00

Sudan	1–0	Rwanda
Khmies 6'

10 October 2024
16:00

Rwanda	0–0	Kenya

10 October 2024
17:00

Tanzania	1–0	Sudan
Khamis 76'

13 October 2024
16:00

Djibouti	0–4	Kenya
		Kitsao 6'; Wangaya 10', 26'; Okoth 49'

13 October 2024
19:00

Tanzania	3–0	Rwanda
Sereri 3'; Kondo 71', 83'

15 October 2024
14:00

Rwanda	5–1	Djibouti
Sindi 9'; Ndayishimiye 23'; Iradukunda 44'; Petry 52' (pen.); Yangiriyeneza 74'		Ahmed Dini Hassan 90+4' (pen.)

15 October 2024
14:00

Sudan	0–4	Kenya
		Kibet 3', 41', 90+2'; Wangaya 68'

==== Group B ====
Pos	Team	Pld	W	D	L	GF	GA	GD	Pts	Qualification
1	Uganda	3	2	1	0	9	3	+6	7	Semi-finals
2	Burundi	3	2	0	1	5	6	−1	6	Semi-finals
3	South Sudan	3	1	1	1	4	4	0	4	
4	Ethiopia	3	0	0	3	3	8	−5	0	

Source: CECAFA
7 October 2024
16:00

South Sudan	0–1	Burundi
		Ndayikengurukiye 8'

7 October 2024
18:00

Uganda	3–0	Ethiopia
Sekibengo 24'; Mpasa 40'; Babulo 90' (o.g.)

9 October 2024
16:00

Uganda	4–1	Burundi
Oyirwoth 2'; Dembe 18', 22'; Hakizimana 59' (o.g.)		Ndayikengurukiye 62'

9 October 2024
18:00

South Sudan	2–1	Ethiopia
Garang 14'; Bichiok 75'		Thurbiel 83'

11 October 2024
16:00

Burundi	3–2	Ethiopia
Ndayikengurukiye 7' (pen.), 34'; Mariniho 87'		Tefera 25'; Iwali 28'

11 October 2024
16:00

Uganda	2–2	South Sudan
Dembe 16', 21'		Swoka 31'; Oleo 90'

=== Knockout stage ===
==== Bracket ====
Semi-finals
18 October –
Uganda	1
Tanzania (a.e.t.)	2
18 October –
Kenya	4
Burundi	0

Final
20 October –
Tanzania	2
Kenya	1
Third place play-off
20 October –
Uganda	3
Burundi	1

==== Semi-finals ====
Winners qualified for 2025 U-20 Africa Cup of Nations.

18 October 2024
15:00

Uganda	1–2 (a.e.t.)	Tanzania
Majub 47'		Maguda 74' (o.g.); Simba 120'

18 October 2024
19:00

Kenya	4–0	Burundi
Okoth 52'; Beja 68'; Kibet 70'; Ingavi 90+5'

==== Third place play-off ====
20 October 2024
12:00

Uganda	3–1	Burundi
Walusimbi 45+1'; Dembe 62', 78'		Hakizimana 6'

==== Final ====
20 October 2024
15:00

Tanzania	2–1	Kenya
Mashaka 63'; Khamis 79'		Beja 47'

== South Zone ==
=== Group stage ===
==== Group A ====
Pos	Team	Pld	W	D	L	GF	GA	GD	Pts	Qualification
1	Zimbabwe	3	2	1	0	5	1	+4	7	Semi-finals
2	Botswana	3	1	2	0	3	2	+1	5	
3	Eswatini	3	1	1	1	5	7	−2	4	
4	Mozambique (H)	3	0	0	3	5	8	−3	0	

Source: COSAFA
(H) Hosts
26 September 2024
12:00

Zimbabwe	1–1	Botswana
Moyo 30'	Report	Kaku 74'

Estádio da Matola, Matola
26 September 2024
15:00

Mozambique	4–5	Eswatini
Neves 20', 62'; Jose 59' (pen.); Seia 90+5'	Report	Dube 36'; Mdluli 38', 53'; Mazibuko 47'; Gwebu 77'

Estádio da Matola, Matola

28 September 2024
12:00

Eswatini	0–3	Zimbabwe
	Report	Cherera 26'; Muzenda 50' (pen.); Ndhlovu 86'

Estádio da Matola Annex, Matola
28 September 2024
15:00

Mozambique	1–2	Botswana
Neves 42'	Report	Japane 68'; Ratshukudu 77' (pen.)

Estádio da Matola Annex, Matola

30 September 2024
15:00

Eswatini	0–0	Botswana
	Report

Estádio da Matola Annex, Matola
30 September 2024
15:00

Mozambique	0–1	Zimbabwe
	Report	Moyo 47'

Estádio da Matola, Matola

==== Group B ====
Pos	Team	Pld	W	D	L	GF	GA	GD	Pts	Qualification
1	Angola	2	2	0	0	4	1	+3	6	Semi-finals
2	Zambia	2	1	0	1	3	4	−1	3	Semi-finals
3	Namibia	2	0	0	2	1	3	−2	0	
4	Madagascar	0	0	0	0	0	0	0	0	Withdrew

Source: COSAFA

Madagascar was also drawn into this group but withdrew before playing.

27 September 2024
15:00

Zambia	1–3	Angola
Mwale 72'	Report	Haidara 28'; Pedro 31'; Chanda 90+3' (o.g.)

Estádio da Matola, Matola

29 September 2024
15:00

Angola	1–0	Namibia
Quissequel 89'	Report

Estádio da Matola Annex, Matola

1 October 2024
12:00

Zambia	2–1	Namibia
Mwanza 37'; Simukonda 62'	Report	Goagoseb 65'

Estádio da Matola, Matola

==== Group C ====
Pos	Team	Pld	W	D	L	GF	GA	GD	Pts	Qualification
1	South Africa	3	3	0	0	13	0	+13	9	Semi-finals
2	Comoros	3	1	0	2	2	4	−2	3	
3	Malawi	3	1	0	2	4	9	−5	3	
4	Lesotho	3	1	0	2	3	9	−6	3	

Source: COSAFA
27 September 2024
12:00

Comoros	1–0	Lesotho
Bacar 81'	Report

Estádio da Matola Annex, Matola
27 September 2024
15:00

South Africa	5–0	Malawi
April 36', 45'; Ah Shene 49'; Lethlaku 68'; Mbokazi 74'	Report

Estádio da Matola Annex, Matola

29 September 2024
12:00

Malawi	2–1	Comoros
Kaduya 11', 79'	Report	Ahamada 27'

Estádio da Matola, Matola
29 September 2024
15:00

South Africa	6–0	Lesotho
Ah Shene 17'; Campbell 25', 75'; Mofoko 42' (o.g.); Lethlaku 50'; Timba 56'	Report

Estádio da Matola, Matola

1 October 2024
15:00

Malawi	2–3	Lesotho
Masinja 64'; Mhango 85' (pen.)	Report	Maile 5' (pen.), 58'; Nthaka 43'

Estádio da Matola Annex, Matola
1 October 2024
15:00

Comoros	0–2	South Africa
	Report	Mabena 46'; Kgosana 83'

Estádio da Matola, Matola

=== Knockout stage ===
==== Bracket ====
Semi-finals
3 October - Matola
Angola	0
South Africa	1
3 October - Matola
Zimbabwe	2 (5)
Zambia (p)	2 (6)

Final
5 October - Matola
South Africa	2
Zambia	0

==== Semi-finals ====
Winners qualified for 2025 U-20 Africa Cup of Nations.

3 October 2024
12:00

Angola	0–1	South Africa
		Ah Shene 25'

3 October 2024
15:00

Zimbabwe	2–2	Zambia
Ndhlovu 62', 75'		Mwale 25'; Simukonda 25'
Penalties
	5–6

==== Final ====
5 October 2024
14:00

South Africa	2–0	Zambia
Campbell 5'; Ah Shene 45'

== Goalscorers ==
There were 65 goals scored in 24 matches, for an average of 2.71 goals per match.

3 goals

- (Mozambique) Kelvio Neves
- (Senegal) Cheikh Thiam
- (Sierra Leone) Momoh Kamara

2 goals

- (Republic of the Congo) Bonaventure Lendambi
- (Eswatini) Alakhe Mdluli
- (The Gambia) Lamin Sillah
- (South Africa) Shakeel April
- (Senegal) Abdourahmane Dia
- (Senegal) Fallou Diouf

1 goal

- (Angola) Amado Haidara
- (Angola) Simão Pedro
- (Botswana) Gaone Japane
- (Botswana) Losika Ratshukudu
- (Botswana) Philip Kaku
- (Republic of the Congo) Dechan Moussavou
- (Cameroon) Harouna Djibrin
- (Cameroon) Laurent Essounga
- (Cameroon) Wilfried Nathan Douala
- (Cameroon) Yvan Nana
- (Comoros) Malaik Bacar
- (Central African Republic) Chérubin Kondja
- (Central African Republic) Jaures Mbaigoto
- (Eswatini) Malwande Gwebu
- (Eswatini) Njongo Mazibuko
- (Eswatini) Phiwayinkhosi Dube
- (Gabon) Ben Kabina Mbélé
- (The Gambia) Alasana Badjie
- (The Gambia) Alagie Wally
- (The Gambia) Amara Camara
- (Guinea-Bissau) Demba Baldé
- (Guinea) Allahssane Camara
- (Guinea) Lamine Youla
- (Guinea) Mouhamed Bangoura
- (Guinea) Tidiane Condé
- (Liberia) Clément Zubah
- (Liberia) Mohamed Koroma
- (Liberia) Nuch Zohn
- (Mozambique) Fernando Jose
- (Mozambique) Yuran Seia
- (South Africa) Lee Jody Ashane
- (South Africa) Kutlwana Lethlaku
- (South Africa) Mbekezeli Mbokazi
- (Senegal) Ibrahima Dieng
- (Sierra Leone) Idrissa Sesay
- (Sierra Leone) Nathaniel Jalloh
- (Sierra Leone) Samuel Ghandi
- (Sierra Leone) Santigie Fornah
- (Zambia) Mumba Mwale
- (Zimbabwe) Enock Moyo
- (Zimbabwe) Tanaka Cherera
- (Zimbabwe) Nisbet Muzenda
- (Zimbabwe) Prince Ndhlovu

1 own goal

- (Zambia) Fostino Chanda (Against Angola)

== See also ==
- 2025 U-17 Africa Cup of Nations qualification
