= 2026 COSAFA U-20 Youth Championship =

COSAFA U-20 Youth Championship 2026
Tournament details
- Host country: Mozambique
- Dates: 18–27 September
- Teams: 12 (from 1 sub-confederation)
- Venues: 2 (in 1 host city)

Final positions
- Champions: South Africa (11th title)
- Runners-up: Mozambique
- Third place: Zambia
- Fourth place: Namibia

Tournament statistics
- Matches played: 22
- Goals scored: 73 (3.32 per match)
- Top scorer: (South Africa) Steven Mendes (6 goals)
- Best player: (Mozambique) Alírio Cuna
- Best goalkeeper: (South Africa) Takalani Mazhamba
- Fair play award: Namibia

The 2026 COSAFA U-20 Youth Championship which also served as the TotalEnergies CAF U-20 AFCON | COSAFA Qualifier, was the 31st edition of the COSAFA U-20 Youth Championship, the international youth football championship organised by COSAFA for the men's under-20 national teams of Southern Africa.

Initially scheduled to be held in Mauritius from 18 to 27 September 2026, the tournament was relocated to Mozambique weeks before the start, with the dates remaining unchanged.

South Africa were the defending champions, having defeated Malawi 3–0 in the final of last year. And they successfully retained their title, defeating hosts Mozambique 2–1 in the final to win their third consecutive title and 11th overall.

== Participation ==
A total of 12 of the 14 COSAFA member associations entered teams for the competition, with Comoros, Lesotho, Mauritius, Mozambique and Seychelles returning to the tournament.

=== Participating teams ===
Note: All appearance statistics are counted starting from the 1999 edition, as limited information is available for the earlier years.

Team	App	Last	Previous best performance
Angola	22nd	2025	Runners-up (2000, 2001, 2002)
Botswana	22nd	2025	Third place (2009, 2013)
Comoros	9th	2024	Group stage (2007, 2008, 2013, 2016, 2019, 2020, 2022, 2024)
Eswatini	23rd	2025	Third place (1985, 1986, 1988, 1990)
Lesotho	22nd	2024	Runners-up (1990, 2005, 2017)
Malawi	20th	2025	Runners-up (2003, 2025)
Mauritius	18th	2022	Group stage (Eighteen times)
Mozambique	22nd	2024	Champions (2020)
Namibia	20th	2025	Runners-up (2010, 2020)
Seychelles	13th	2022	Group stage (Thirteen times)
South Africa	23rd	2025	Champions (2000, 2004, 2006, 2008, 2009, 2013, 2017, 2018, 2024, 2025)
Zambia	23rd	2025	Champions (1983, 1986, 1993, 1995, 1997, 1999, 2003, 2010, 2011, 2016, 2019, 2022)

Did not enter

- Madagascar
- Zimbabwe – ZIFA decided not to enter the tournament in order to focus on reorganising its youth football structures and establishing a more structured scouting and player-development system. And stated that it wanted to ensure its youth national teams had adequate preparation, a properly identified player pool and a clear technical programme before returning to international competition.

== Match officials ==
Referees

- (Botswana) Keabetswe Dintwa
- (Eswatini) Sanele Ntimane
- (Madagascar) Lominson Todihajaniaina
- (Madagascar) Arnaud Zafimahatoha
- (Malawi) David Chinoko
- (Malawi) Eness Gumbo
- (Mozambique) Celso Alvação
- (Namibia) Mweshitsama Negongo
- (South Africa) Akhona Makalima
- (South Africa) Eugine Mdluli
- (Zambia) Charles Ng'andwe

Assistant referees

- (Botswana) Leungo Tsogang
- (Comoros) Soulaimane Amaldine
- (Madagascar) Romuald Ibenantenaina
- (Mauritius) Louis Cauvelet
- (Mozambique) Zacarias Baloi
- (Mozambique) Inocêncio Lourenço
- (Namibia) Olivia Amukuu
- (Namibia) Alex Lumponjani
- (South Africa) Kgara Mokoena
- (Zambia) Francis Swaba
- (Zimbabwe) Polite Dube

== Draw ==
The draw was held on 12 August 2026 at 13:00 CAT (UTC+2) in Johannesburg, South Africa.

For the purposes of the draw, the teams were ranked according to their results in the previous three COSAFA U-20 Championships. Hosts Mauritius were automatically seeded in position A1, while the two highest-ranked teams, South Africa and Zambia, were seeded in positions B1 and C1, respectively. The remaining nine teams were divided into three pots of three teams each, with a separate set of three pots determining the group positions.

Pot 1	Pot 2	Pot 3
Angola; Malawi; Mozambique	Botswana; Namibia; Eswatini	Comoros; Lesotho; Seychelles

The groups remained unchanged after Mauritius was replaced as host.

== Group stage ==
=== Group A ===
Pos	Team	Pld	W	D	L	GF	GA	GD	Pts	Qualification
1	Namibia	3	3	0	0	5	0	+5	9	Semi-finals
2	Mozambique	3	2	0	1	9	2	+7	6	Semi-finals
3	Seychelles	3	1	0	2	5	10	−5	3	
4	Mauritius	3	0	0	3	3	10	−7	0	

Source: COSAFA
18 September 2026
12:00

Mauritius	0–1	Namibia
	Report	Sakeus 43'

Zimpeto Stadium, Maputo
Referee: Keabetswe Dintwa (Botswana)
18 September 2026
18:00

Mozambique	4–1	Seychelles
Macuácua 19'; Cuna 29', 57'; Abdala 77'	Report	Rajabary 5'

Zimpeto Stadium, Maputo
Referee: David Chinoko (Malawi)

20 September 2026
12:00

Mauritius	3–4	Seychelles
Lalsing 21', 90+4'; Ravina 53' (pen.)	Report	Hoareau 27' (pen.), 60' (pen.), 71'; Barbe 82'

ABB Stadium (Pitch 2), Maputo
Referee: Keabetswe Dintwa (Botswana)
20 September 2026
15:00

Mozambique	0–1	Namibia
	Report	Naobeb 18'

ABB Stadium (Pitch 2), Maputo
Referee: Arnaud Zafimahatoha (Madagascar)

22 September 2026
15:00

Seychelles	0–3	Namibia
	Report	Naobeb 15'; Ashitenda 62'; Sakeus 78'

ABB Stadium (Pitch 2), Maputo
Referee: Arnaud Zafimahatoha (Madagascar)
22 September 2026
15:00

Mozambique	5–0	Mauritius
Cuna 12', 19', 77'; Machel 25'; Romão 90+6'	Report

ABB Stadium (Pitch 1), Maputo
Referee: Charles Ng'andwe (Zambia)

=== Group B ===
Pos	Team	Pld	W	D	L	GF	GA	GD	Pts	Qualification
1	South Africa	3	3	0	0	7	0	+7	9	Semi-finals
2	Angola	3	2	0	1	9	2	+7	6	
3	Eswatini	3	1	0	2	3	8	−5	3	
4	Lesotho	3	0	0	3	2	11	−9	0	

Source: COSAFA
19 September 2026
12:00

South Africa	3–0	Lesotho
Mendes 45+1', 60'; Mlangeni 65'	Report

Zimpeto Stadium, Maputo
Referee: Celso Alvação (Mozambique)
19 September 2026
15:00

Angola	4–0	Eswatini
Muxito 21'; Kulica 35'; Muanha 45'; Luisinho 50'	Report

Zimpeto Stadium, Maputo
Referee: Lominson Todihajaniaina (Madagascar)

21 September 2026
15:00

South Africa	2–0	Angola
Maku 14'; Mendes 41'	Report

ABB Stadium (Pitch 1), Maputo
Referee: Eness Gumbo (Malawi)
21 September 2026
18:00

Eswatini	3–2	Lesotho
Gama 13', 90+1'; Malaza 42'	Report	Kalache 30'; Tuoane 90'

ABB Stadium (Pitch 1), Maputo
Referee: Akhona Makalima (South Africa)

23 September 2026
12:00

South Africa	2–0	Eswatini
Mazibuko 25'; Nalumango 34'	Report

ABB Stadium (Pitch 1), Maputo
Referee: Keabetswe Dintwa (Botswana)
23 September 2026
12:00

Lesotho	0–5	Angola
	Report	Muanha 6'; Luisinho 13', 19' (pen.); Romano 37', 86'

ABB Stadium (Pitch 2), Maputo
Referee: Mweshitsama Negongo (Namibia)

=== Group C ===
Pos	Team	Pld	W	D	L	GF	GA	GD	Pts	Qualification
1	Zambia	3	3	0	0	8	1	+7	9	Semi-finals
2	Malawi	3	2	0	1	5	3	+2	6	
3	Comoros	3	0	1	2	1	5	−4	1	
4	Botswana	3	0	1	2	1	6	−5	1	

Source: COSAFA
18 September 2026
15:00

Zambia	2–0	Malawi
Daka 80', 90+8'	Report

Zimpeto Stadium, Maputo
Referee: Eugine Mdluli (South Africa)
19 September 2026
18:00

Comoros	0–0	Botswana
	Report

Zimpeto Stadium, Maputo
Referee: Akhona Makalima (South Africa)

21 September 2026
11:00

Zambia	3–0	Comoros
Mununga 5'; Nyirongo 17'; Chinunda 64'	Report	I. Abdallah (red card) 45+5'; Othman (red card) 71'

ABB Stadium (Pitch 2), Maputo
Referee: Mweshitsama Negongo (Namibia)
21 September 2026
14:00

Botswana	0–3	Malawi
Seleke (red card) 29'	Report	Billiat 22'; Kalambo 45+3'; Chibalo 90+3'

ABB Stadium (Pitch 2), Maputo
Referee: Sanele Ntimane (Eswatini)

23 September 2026
15:00

Zambia	3–1	Botswana
Silubonde 9', 64'; Foloko 90+1'	Report	Murandu 47'

ABB Stadium (Pitch 1), Maputo
Referee: Eugine Mdluli (South Africa)
23 September 2026
15:00

Malawi	2–1	Comoros
Issilamou-Hamza 90+3' (o.g.); Yasini 90+6'	Report	Moussa 23'

ABB Stadium (Pitch 2), Maputo
Referee: Akhona Makalima (South Africa)

=== Ranking of second-placed teams ===
Pos	Grp	Team	Pld	W	D	L	GF	GA	GD	Pts	Qualification
1	A	Mozambique	3	2	0	1	9	2	+7	6 (Note: Tied on points, goal differential and goals scored. Fair Play points were used as tiebreaker.)	Semi-finals
2	B	Angola	3	2	0	1	9	2	+7	6	
3	C	Malawi	3	2	0	1	5	3	+2	6	

Source: COSAFA
Rules for classification: Group tiebreakers

== Knockout stage ==
=== Bracket ===
Semi-finals
25 September
South Africa	4
Zambia	2
25 September
Namibia	0
Mozambique	3

Final
27 September
South Africa	2
Mozambique	1
Third place
27 September
Zambia	3
Namibia	0

=== Semi-finals ===
25 September 2026
12:00

South Africa	4–2	Zambia
Mendes 63' (pen.), 85' (pen.); Booysen 65'; Witbooi 90+6'	Report	Musialela 29'; Kalamina 75' (red card) 83'

ABB Stadium (Pitch 1), Maputo

25 September 2026
18:00

Namibia	0–3	Mozambique
	Report	Começar 15'; Pelembe 57'; Sócrates 79'

ABB Stadium (Pitch 1), Maputo
Referee: Eugine Mdluli (South Africa)

=== Third place ===
27 September 2026
11:00

Zambia	3–0	Namibia
Mumbi 42'; Muntanga 62', 90+1'	Report

ABB Stadium (Pitch 1), Maputo
Referee: Eugine Mdluli (South Africa)

=== Final ===
27 September 2026
14:00

South Africa	2–1	Mozambique
Booysen 28'; Mendes 58' (pen.)	Report	Começar 30'; Macombe (red card) 90+2'

ABB Stadium (Pitch 1), Maputo
Referee: Mweshitsama Negongo (Namibia)

== Goalscorers ==
There were 73 goals scored in 22 matches, for an average of 3.32 goals per match.

6 goals

- (South Africa) Steven Mendes

5 goals

- (Mozambique) Alírio Cuna

3 goals

- (Angola) Luisinho
- (Seychelles) Lorenzo Hoareau

2 goals

- (Angola) Romano Domingos
- (Angola) Jairo Muanha
- (Eswatini) Njabulo Gama
- (Mauritius) Quentin Lalsing
- (Mozambique) Martinho Começar
- (Namibia) Lukas Sakeus
- (Namibia) Rashid Naobeb
- (South Africa) Oarabile Booysen
- (Zambia) Billy Daka
- (Zambia) Sipho Muntanga
- (Zambia) Daniel Silubonde

1 goal

- (Angola) Domingos Muxito
- (Angola) Kulica
- (Botswana) Kent Murandu
- (Comoros) Ziyad Moussa
- (Eswatini) Andiswa Malaza
- (Lesotho) Lekanyane Kalache
- (Lesotho) Kabelo Tuoane
- (Malawi) Misheck Billiat
- (Malawi) Grant Chibalo
- (Malawi) Clever Kalambo
- (Malawi) Austin Yasini
- (Mauritius) Jean Ravina
- (Mozambique) Faizal Abdala
- (Mozambique) Khensane Machel
- (Mozambique) Fanuel Macuácua
- (Mozambique) Diego Pelembe
- (Mozambique) Rizan Romão
- (Mozambique) Hissen Sócrate
- (Namibia) Mateus Ashitenda
- (Seychelles) Naythan Barbe
- (Seychelles) Eriano Rajabary
- (South Africa) Lazola Maku
- (South Africa) Manelisi Mazibuko
- (South Africa) Tebogo Mlangeni
- (South Africa) Milimo Nalumango
- (South Africa) Emile Witbooi
- (Zambia) Kayula Chinunda
- (Zambia) John Foloko
- (Zambia) Jonathan Kalimina
- (Zambia) Gift Mumbi
- (Zambia) Tumalo Mununga
- (Zambia) Duncan Musialela
- (Zambia) Abel Nyirongo

1 own goal

- (Comoros) Fayyad Issilamou-Hamza (against Malawi)
