= 2015 African U-20 Championship qualification =

Tournament details
- Dates: 4 April – 31 August 2014
- Teams: 43 (from 1 confederation)

Tournament statistics
- Matches played: 63
- Goals scored: 143 (2.27 per match)
- Top scorer(s): (Lesotho) Thabiso Brown (5 goals)

The qualification phase of the 2015 African U-20 Championship decided the participating teams of the final tournament. A total of eight teams will play in the final tournament, to be hosted by Senegal.

Qualification ties were played on a home-and-away two-legged basis. If the sides were level on aggregate after the second leg, the away goals rule was applied, and if still level, the tie proceeded directly to a penalty shoot-out (no extra time was played).

== Teams ==
A total of 43 teams entered the qualification phase.

Round	Teams entering round	No. of teams
Did not enter	Algeria; Cape Verde; Central African Republic; Comoros; Eritrea; Madagascar; Mauritius; São Tomé and Príncipe; Uganda; Zimbabwe	10
First round	Botswana; Burundi; Chad; Congo; Djibouti; Equatorial Guinea; Ethiopia; Gambia; Guinea; Guinea-Bissau; Ivory Coast; Kenya; Lesotho; Liberia; Libya; Malawi; Mauritania; Mozambique; Namibia; Niger; Rwanda; Seychelles; Sierra Leone; Somalia; South Sudan; Sudan; Swaziland; Tanzania; Togo; Tunisia	30
Second round	Angola; Benin; Burkina Faso; Cameroon; DR Congo; Egypt; Gabon; Ghana; Mali; Morocco; Nigeria; South Africa; Zambia	13
Final tournament	Senegal (hosts)	1

== First round ==
The first legs were scheduled for 4–6 April 2014, and the second legs were scheduled for 25–27 April 2014.

Team 1	Agg.	Team 2	1st leg	2nd leg
Mozambique	4–2	Namibia	2–1	2–1
Malawi	3–2	Botswana	1–1	2–1
Swaziland	2–4	Lesotho	0–3	2–1
Kenya	0–0 (3–4 p)	Tanzania	0–0	0–0
Seychelles	0–5	Ethiopia	0–2	0–3
Djibouti	1–2	Burundi	1–1	0–1
South Sudan	w/o (Note: South Sudan withdrew.)	Rwanda	—	—
Sierra Leone	2–0	Guinea	1–0	1–0
Somalia	0–6 (Note: Somalia and Sudan played one match only.)	Sudan	—	0–6
Niger	2–2 (5–6 p)	Congo	2–0	0–2
Liberia	awd. (Note: Gambia were disqualified after fielding five over-age players (Sampierre Mendy, Buba Sanneh, Bubacarr Trawally, Saloum Fall and Ali Sowe) in the first leg against Liberia.)	Gambia	0–1	—
Ivory Coast	w/o (Note: Guinea-Bissau withdrew.)	Guinea-Bissau	—	—
Chad	0–4	Libya	0–1	0–3
Tunisia	6–1	Mauritania	3–0	3–1
Togo	w/o (Note: Equatorial Guinea withdrew.)	Equatorial Guinea	—	—

Notes

5 April 2014
15:00 UTC+2

Mozambique	2–1	Namibia
Luís Miquissone 34'; Norberto Marcolino Norberto 57'	Report	Uaseuko Katjiukua 40'

Estádio Da Liga Muçulmana, Matola
Referee: Mbongiseni Elliot Fakudze (Swaziland)
26 April 2014
14:00 UTC+1

Namibia	1–2	Mozambique
Henry Duwe 72'	Report	Germino Eduardo 52', 89'

Sam Nujoma Stadium, Windhoek
Referee: Lekgotla Leonard Johannes (Botswana)

Mozambique won 4–2 on aggregate.

5 April 2014
14:30 UTC+2

Malawi	1–1	Botswana
Ng'ambi Khumbo 3'	Report	Karabo Phiri 20'

Kamuzu Stadium, Blantyre
Referee: Stanley Hachiwa (Zambia)
25 April 2014
16:00 UTC+2

Botswana	1–2	Malawi
Makgantai Onkabetse 89'	Report	Chawanangwa Kaonga 53', 66'

Molepolole Stadium, Molepolole
Referee: Joao Amado Goma (Angola)

Malawi won 3–2 on aggregate.

5 April 2014
15:00 UTC+2

Swaziland	0–3	Lesotho
	Report	Brown 30', 65'; Tokelo Lemagon Majoro 90' (pen.)

Somhlolo National Stadium, Lobamba
Referee: Naasif Moegamat Julius (South Africa)
27 April 2014
15:00 UTC+2

Lesotho	1–2	Swaziland
Morapeli Losoetse 89'	Report	Nkambule Mlanduo 60', 71'

Setsoto Stadium, Maseru
Referee: Duncan Lengani (Malawi)

Lesotho won 4–2 on aggregate.

6 April 2014
16:00 UTC+3

Kenya	0–0	Tanzania
	Report

Kenyatta Stadium, Machakos
Referee: Abdoul Karim Twagiramukiza (Rwanda)
27 April 2014
16:00 UTC+3

Tanzania	0–0	Kenya
	Report
Penalties
	4–3

Benjamin Mkapa National Stadium, Dar es Salaam
Referee: Pacifique Ndabihawenimana (Burundi)

0–0 on aggregate. Tanzania won on penalties.

5 April 2014
16:30 UTC+4

Seychelles	0–2	Ethiopia
	Report	? ?' ? ?'

Stade Linité, Victoria
Referee: Israel Mpaima (Kenya)
27 April 2014
16:00 UTC+3

Ethiopia	3–0	Seychelles
Dukele Dawa Hotessa 33'; Ayele Aklilu 56' (pen.); Worku Surafel Getachew 67'	Report

Addis Ababa Stadium, Addis Ababa
Referee: Ibrahim Nour El Din (Egypt)

Ethiopia won 5–0 on aggregate.

4 April 2014
15:00 UTC+3

Djibouti	1–1	Burundi
Warsama Houssein Said 14'	Report	Mpawenayo Kevin Raoul 76'

Stade du Ville, Djibouti
Referee: Allaister Barra (Seychelles)
27 April 2014
15:00 UTC+2

Burundi	1–0	Djibouti
Emmanuel Mvuyekure 73'	Report

Prince Louis Rwagasore Stadium, Bujumbura
Referee: Sebit Rassas Librato (South Sudan)

Burundi won 2–1 on aggregate.

4 April 2014

South Sudan	Cancelled	Rwanda
	Report

25 April 2014

Rwanda	Cancelled	South Sudan
	Report

Rwanda won on default.

5 April 2014
16:30 UTC±0

Sierra Leone	1–0	Guinea
Sorie Barrie 37'	Report

Wusum Sports Stadium, Makeni
Referee: Isaac T Z Montgomery (Liberia)
25 April 2014
16:30 UTC±0

Guinea	0–1	Sierra Leone
	Report	Ibrahim Kamara 21'

Stade du 28 Septembre, Conakry
Referee: Daouda Kebe (Senegal)

Sierra Leone won 2–0 on aggregate.

27 April 2014
20:00 UTC+3

Sudan	6–0	Somalia
Elshareef Eshag Ahmed 4'; Wagdi Awad Abd Alla 7'; Zahid Hussein Gad Alla 24', 77'; Mohamed Mukhtar Fadl Osman 66', 90'	Report

Khartoum Stadium, Khartoum
Referee: Farah Aden Ali (Djibouti)

Sudan won 6–0 on aggregate.

5 April 2014
16:00 UTC+1

Niger	2–0	Congo
Jafar Ibrahim Ahmed A 24', 87'	Report

Stade Général Seyni Kountché, Niamey
Referee: Louis Sanou (Burkina Faso)
27 April 2014
15:30 UTC+1

Congo	2–0	Niger
Loussoukou 11' (pen.); Okombi 83'	Report
Penalties
	6–5

Stade Denis Sassou Nguesso, Dolisie
Referee: Joaquin Ela Esono Eyang (Equatorial Guinea)

2–2 on aggregate. Congo won on penalties.

6 April 2014
16:00 UTC±0

Liberia	0–1	Gambia
	Report	Bakary Daffeh 31'

Antoinette Tubman Stadium, Monrovia
Referee: Akintoye Germain Koole (Benin)
25 April 2014
16:30 UTC±0

Gambia	Cancelled	Liberia
	Report

Independence Stadium, Bakau

Liberia won on default.

5 April 2014
16:00 UTC±0

Ivory Coast	Cancelled	Guinea-Bissau
	Report

Stade Robert Champroux, Abidjan
25 April 2014

Guinea-Bissau	Cancelled	Ivory Coast
	Report

Ivory Coast won on default.

4 April 2014
16:00 UTC+1

Chad	0–1	Libya
	Report	Osama Albedwi 76'

Stade Omnisports Idriss Mahamat Ouya, N'Djamena
Referee: El Fadil Mohamed Hussein (Sudan)
27 April 2014
16:00 UTC+1

Libya	3–0	Chad
Rwdi Hamed 5', 86'; Djimhoue Fabrice 18' (o.g.)	Report

Stade El Menzah, Tunis (Tunisia)
Referee: Hassan Mohamed Hagi (Somalia)

Libya won 4–0 on aggregate.

5 April 2014
15:00 UTC+1

Tunisia	3–0	Mauritania
Chinaberry Jebali 52'; Firas Ben. Arbi 68'; Mehdi Ouedherfi 79'	Report

Stade El Menzah, Tunis
Referee: Baba Leno (Guinea)
26 April 2014
17:00 UTC±0

Mauritania	1–3	Tunisia
Mohamed Vall Elkory 29'	Report	Yamen Sfaxi 57'; Mehdi Ouedherfi 77'; Chamseddine Samti 88'

Stade Olympique, Nouakchott
Referee: Prosper Adii (Ghana)

Tunisia won 6–1 on aggregate.

6 April 2014
15:30 UTC±0

Togo	Cancelled	Equatorial Guinea
	Report

Stade de Kégué, Lomé
25 April 2014

Equatorial Guinea	Cancelled	Togo
	Report

Togo won on default.

== Second round ==
The first legs were scheduled for 9–11 May 2014, and the second legs were scheduled for 23–25 May 2014.

Team 1	Agg.	Team 2	1st leg	2nd leg
Mozambique	0–4	Zambia	0–2	0–2
Malawi	3–1	DR Congo	1–1	2–0
Lesotho	4–1	Angola	3–1	1–0
Tanzania	1–6	Nigeria	0–2	1–4
Ethiopia	0–3	South Africa	0–2	0–1
Burundi	1–2	Cameroon	0–1	1–1
Rwanda	0–1	Gabon	0–0	0–1
Sierra Leone	1–4	Ghana	0–2	1–2
Sudan	0–5	Egypt	0–3	0–2
Congo	3–3 (3–2 p)	Benin	2–1	1–2
Liberia	1–2	Ivory Coast	1–0	0–2
Libya	4–2	Tunisia	1–1	3–1
Togo	4–4 (a)	Morocco	0–2	4–2
Burkina Faso	2–3	Mali	0–3	2–0

10 May 2014
15:00 UTC+2

Mozambique	0–2	Zambia
	Report	Ngoma 27'; Musonda 87'

Estádio do Zimpeto, Maputo
Referee: Norman Matemera (Zimbabwe)
25 May 2014
15:00 UTC+2

Zambia	2–0	Mozambique
Sautu 65'; Ngoma 90'	Report

Nkoloma Stadium, Lusaka
Referee: Ganesh Chutooree (Mauritius)

Zambia won 4–0 on aggregate.

10 May 2014
14:30 UTC+2

Malawi	1–1	DR Congo
Suwedi Limbani 77'	Report	Manzinga 69'

Kamuzu Stadium, Blantyre
Referee: Louis Hakizimana (Rwanda)
23 May 2014
15:30 UTC+1

DR Congo	0–2	Malawi
	Report	Kaliati 11'; Chawanangwa Kaonga 40'

Stade Tata Raphaël, Kinshasa
Referee: Haileyesus Bazezew Belete (Ethiopia)

Malawi won 3–1 on aggregate.

11 May 2014
15:00 UTC+2

Lesotho	3–1	Angola
Brown 10', 46'; Khutlang 44'	Report	Filhão 28'

Setsoto Stadium, Maseru
Referee: Anibal Armando Antonio (Mozambique)
25 May 2014
16:00 UTC+1

Angola	0–1	Lesotho
	Report	Brown 51'

Estádio dos Coqueiros, Luanda
Referee: Andofetra Avombitana Rakotojaona (Madagascar)

Lesotho won 4–1 on aggregate.

11 May 2014
16:00 UTC+3

Tanzania	0–2	Nigeria
	Report	Yahaya Musa Auwal 49'; Awoniyi Taiwo Micheal 83'

Benjamin Mkapa National Stadium, Dar es Salaam
Referee: Ndala Jean-Jacques Ngambo (DR Congo)
24 May 2014
16:00 UTC+1

Nigeria	4–1	Tanzania
Abdullahi Ibrahim A. 6'; Yahaya Musa Auwal 33'; Awoniyi Taiwo Micheal 36'; Ezeh Chidera 68'	Report	Banda Abdi 16'

Ahmadu Bello Stadium, Kaduna
Referee: Alhadi Allaou Mahamat (Chad)

Nigeria won 6–1 on aggregate.

11 May 2014
16:00 UTC+3

Ethiopia	0–2	South Africa
	Report	Tshepo Chaine 68'; Siyanda Ngubo 85'

Addis Ababa Stadium, Addis Ababa
Referee: Mashood Ssali (Uganda)
25 May 2014
15:00 UTC+2

South Africa	1–0	Ethiopia
Ntuli 38' (pen.)	Report

Dobsonville Stadium, Johannesburg
Referee: Osiase William Koto (Lesotho)

South Africa won 3–0 on aggregate.

11 May 2014
15:30 UTC+2

Burundi	0–1	Cameroon
	Report	Ephraim Yosanguim 45+1'

Prince Louis Rwagasore Stadium, Bujumbura
Referee: Waziri Sheha Waziri (Tanzania)
25 May 2014
15:30 UTC+1

Cameroon	1–1	Burundi
Noubissi 31'	Report	Emmanuel Mvuyekure 27'

Stade Ahmadou Ahidjo, Yaoundé
Referee: Beranger Raymond Woungui Antsaraga (Gabon)

Cameroon won 2–1 on aggregate.

11 May 2014
15:30 UTC+2

Rwanda	0–0	Gabon
	Report

Stade Régional Nyamirambo, Kigali
Referee: Yemane A.Gebremedhin (Eritrea)
24 May 2014
15:30 UTC+1

Gabon	1–0	Rwanda
Dinda 48'	Report

Stade Augustin Monédan de Sibang, Libreville
Referee: Messie Jessie Oved Nkounkou Mvoutou (Congo)

Gabon won 1–0 on aggregate.

10 May 2014
16:30 UTC±0

Sierra Leone	0–2	Ghana
	Report	Tetteh 39'; Kasim 82'

Ernest Bai Koroma Stadium, Bo
Referee: Ousmane Sidibe (Mali)
24 May 2014
15:00 UTC±0

Ghana	2–1	Sierra Leone
Agyepong 44'; Latif Abubakar 52'	Report	Sorie Barrie 38'

Tamale Stadium, Tamale
Referee: Maudo Jallow (Gambia)

Ghana won 4–1 on aggregate.

11 May 2014
20:00 UTC+3

Sudan	0–3	Egypt
	Report	Karim Waleed Sayed Saleh Hassan 5'; Nasser Maher Abdelhamid Abdelhamid 90+2'; Mohamed Magdy Mohamed Morsy 90+5'

Khartoum Stadium, Khartoum
Referee: Abdallah Baesus Ashraf (Libya)
24 May 2014
17:00 UTC+3

Egypt	2–0	Sudan
Abdalla Gomaa Ouda Saleh 39'; Ahmed Hassan Mahmoud El Gehawi 41'	Report

Alexandria Stadium, Alexandria
Referee: Khalid Ennouni (Morocco)

Egypt won 5–0 on aggregate.

11 May 2014
15:30 UTC+1

Congo	2–1	Benin
Koukpo 16' (o.g.); Ganvoula 71' (pen.)	Report	Kader Georges Bidimbou 69' (o.g.)

Stade Municipal, Pointe-Noire
Referee: Antoine Max Depadoux Effa Essouma (Cameroon)
25 May 2014
16:00 UTC+1

Benin	2–1	Congo
Abdel Fadel Suanon 53', 62'	Report	Deldy Goyi 90+2'
Penalties
	2–3

Stade Charles de Gaulle, Porto-Novo
Referee: Bienvenu Sinko (Ivory Coast)

3–3 on aggregate. Congo won on penalties.

11 May 2014
16:00 UTC±0

Liberia	1–0	Ivory Coast
Blamo Nimely 86' (pen.)	Report

Antoinette Tubman Stadium, Monrovia
Referee: Kokou Hougnimon Fagla (Togo)
25 May 2014
15:30 UTC±0

Ivory Coast	2–0	Liberia
Britto 39'; Méïté 58'	Report

Stade Robert Champroux, Abidjan
Referee: Hamidu Seidu Bomison (Ghana)

Ivory Coast won 2–1 on aggregate.

11 May 2014
17:00 UTC+1

Libya	1–1	Tunisia
Ellafi 42'	Report	Bashed Dine Othman 49'

Stade Mustapha Tchaker, Blida (Algeria)
Referee: Mehdi Abid Charef (Algeria)
24 May 2014
17:00 UTC+1

Tunisia	1–3	Libya
Tbarki Bilel 32'	Report	Moftah Taktak 43'; Mohamed Zaghdud 50' (pen.); Adel Abuguba 54'

Stade El Menzah, Tunis
Referee: Mahmoud Zakria El Banna (Egypt)

Libya won 4–2 on aggregate.

11 May 2014
15:30 UTC±0

Togo	0–2	Morocco
	Report	Khaloua 34'; Nabil Jaadi 53' (pen.)

Stade Municipal, Lomé
Referee: Slim Belkhaouas (Tunisia)
24 May 2014
17:30 UTC+1

Morocco	2–4	Togo
Khaloua 10'; Nabil Jaadi 22' (pen.)	Report	Kougbenya 33', 50'; Akoete Junior Donou 80'; Moktar Nambiema 90'

Stade Prince Moulay Al Hassan, Rabat
Referee: Ferdinand Udoh Anietie (Nigeria)

4–4 on aggregate. Togo won on away goals.

10 May 2014
16:00 UTC±0

Burkina Faso	0–3	Mali
	Report	Guindo 16', 72', 83'

Stade du 4-Août, Ouagadougou
Referee: Lalidia Namouano Souleymane (Niger)
25 May 2014
17:00 UTC±0

Mali	0–2	Burkina Faso
	Report	Sawadogo Ilasse 17', 67'

Stade Modibo Kéïta, Bamako
Referee: Daouda Gueye (Senegal)

Mali won 3–2 on aggregate.

== Third round ==
The first legs were scheduled for 15–17 August 2014, and the second legs were scheduled for 29–31 August 2014.

Team 1	Agg.	Team 2	1st leg	2nd leg
Malawi	1–3	Zambia	1–2	0–1
Nigeria	w/o (Note: Lesotho withdrew because they refused to play with Nigeria due to Ebola concerns. This meant Nigeria qualified automatically.)	Lesotho	—	—
Cameroon	2–3	South Africa	1–1	1–2
Ghana	4–1	Gabon	0–0	4–1
Congo	3–2	Egypt	2–0	1–2
Libya	3–4	Ivory Coast	2–1	1–3
Mali	2–1	Togo	2–0	0–1

Notes

16 August 2014
14:30 UTC+2

Malawi	1–2	Zambia
Chawanangwa Kaonga 37' (pen.)	Report	Bwalya 13'; Zulu 32'

Kamuzu Stadium, Blantyre
Referee: Lwandile Mfiki (South Africa)
30 August 2014
15:00 UTC+2

Zambia	1–0	Malawi
Bwalya 53'	Report

Nkoloma Stadium, Lusaka
Referee: Tirelo Mositwane (Botswana)

Zambia won 3–1 on aggregate.

15 August 2014

Nigeria	Cancelled	Lesotho
	Report

Ahmadu Bello Stadium, Kaduna
29 August 2014

Lesotho	Cancelled	Nigeria
	Report

Nigeria won on default.

16 August 2014
14:00 UTC+1

Cameroon	1–1	South Africa
Eteme Adamou Achille Stephane 46'	Report	Siyanda Ngubo 62'

Stade Ahmadou Ahidjo, Yaoundé
Referee: Ndala Jean-Jacques Ngambo (DR Congo)
31 August 2014
15:00 UTC+2

South Africa	2–1	Cameroon
Lakay 38', 44'	Report	Noubissi 3'

Old Peter Mokaba Stadium, Polokwane
Referee: Parmendra Nunkoo (Mauritius)

South Africa won 3–2 on aggregate.

17 August 2014
15:00 UTC±0

Ghana	0–0	Gabon
	Report

Accra Sports Stadium, Accra
Referee: Boukari Ouedraogo (Burkina Faso)
30 August 2014
15:30 UTC+1

Gabon	1–4	Ghana
Méyé ?' (pen.)	Report	Attobrah ?'; Yeboah ?'; Afful ?'; Kasim ?'

Stade Augustin Monédan de Sibang, Libreville
Referee: Romualdo Do Rosario Baltazar (Angola)

Ghana won 4–1 on aggregate.

17 August 2014
15:30 UTC+1

Congo	2–0	Egypt
Magdy 71' (o.g.); Ndzila 77'	Report

Stade Municipal, Pointe-Noire
Referee: Beranger Raymond Woungui Antsaraga (Gabon)
31 August 2014
19:00 UTC+3

Egypt	2–1	Congo
Youssef Mohamed Ibrahim Morsy 22' (pen.); Karim Walid 78'	Report	Arci Tchibaut Mouanga 49'

Alexandria Stadium, Alexandria
Referee: Haileyesus Bazezew Belete (Ethiopia)

Congo won 3–2 on aggregate.

15 August 2014
17:00 UTC+1

Libya	2–1	Ivory Coast
Rwid Hamed 6'; Ellafi 32'	Report	Méïté 66'

Stade El Menzah, Tunis (Tunisia)
Referee: Noureddine El Jaafari (Morocco)
30 August 2014
15:00 UTC±0

Ivory Coast	3–1	Libya
Junior Landry Ahissan 43', 75'; Ba Loua 79'	Report	Almoatesem Al Musrati 30'

Stade Robert Champroux, Abidjan
Referee: Maudo Jallow (Gambia)

Ivory Coast won 4–3 on aggregate.

17 August 2014
16:00 UTC±0

Mali	2–0	Togo
Guilavogui 78'; Diarra 84'	Report

Stade Modibo Kéïta, Bamako
Referee: Mohamed Hamada (Mauritania)
31 August 2014
15:00 UTC±0

Togo	1–0	Mali
Abdou-Samiou Tchatakora 19'	Report

Stade Municipal, Lomé
Referee: Cecil Amatey Fleischer (Ghana)

Mali won 2–1 on aggregate.

== Qualified teams ==
- Congo
- Ghana
- Ivory Coast
- Mali
- Nigeria
- Senegal (hosts)
- South Africa
- Zambia
