= Shandre =

Shandre is a given name. Notable people with the name include:

- Shandre Campbell (born 2005), South African soccer player
- Shandre Fritz (born 1985), South African former cricketer
- Shandre Frolick, Rugby player
