= Kennedy Mupomba =

Footballer (born 2005)

Personal information
- Full name: Kennedy Junior Mupomba
- Date of birth: 22 January 2005 (age 21)
- Place of birth: Manchester, England
- Height: 1.76 m (5 ft 9 in)
- Position: Midfielder

Team information
- Current team: Hashtag United

Youth career
- West Ham United
- 2021–2022: Chelmsford City
- 2022–2023: Colchester United

Senior career*
Years	Team	Apps	(Gls)
2023–2024	Colchester United	0	(0)
2024	→ Bishop's Stortford (loan)	1	(0)
2024–2025	Chelmsford City	5	(0)
2024	→ Hertford Town (loan)	4	(0)
2024–2025	→ Concord Rangers (loan)	12	(0)
2025–2026	CAPS United		
2026	Maldon & Tiptree	1	(0)
2026–	Hashtag United	1	(0)

International career^{‡}
2019	England U15		
2024	Zimbabwe U20	3	(0)
2025–	Zimbabwe	2	(0)
- * Club domestic league appearances and goals as of 22:00, 25 August 2026 (UTC) ‡ National team caps and goals as of 22:00, 19 January 2026 (UTC)

Kennedy Junior Mupomba (born 22 January 2005) is a professional footballer who plays as a midfielder for Hashtag United. Born in England, he represents the Zimbabwe national team at international level.

== Club career ==
Mupomba began his career in the academy at West Ham United. In 2021, Mupomba joined the youth set-up at Chelmsford City, also playing for the reserve side in the Essex and Suffolk Border League. On 1 September 2022, Chelmsford announced Mupomba had signed for Colchester United. On 29 March 2024, Mupomba signed for National League North side Bishop's Stortford on loan.

Ahead of the 2024–25 season, Mupomba re-joined Chelmsford City. During his time at Chelmsford, Mupomba was loaned out to Hertford Town and Concord Rangers, before making his debut for the club on 5 April 2025 in a 1–0 win against Chippenham Town.

In July 2025, Mupomba signed for Zimbabwe Premier Soccer League club CAPS United.

In August 2026, Mupomba returned to England, signing for Isthmian League side Maldon & Tiptree. Later that month, after a single appearance for Maldon, Mupomba signed for Hashtag United.

== International career ==
Whilst in the academy at West Ham, Mupomba represented England at under-15 level. Mupomba later represented Zimbabwe U20 at the 2024 COSAFA U-20 Cup.

On 4 June 2025, Mupomba made his senior debut for Zimbabwe, starting in a 0–0 draw against Mauritius in the 2025 COSAFA Cup.
