= 2025 COSAFA U-20 Championship =

COSAFA U-20 Youth Championship 2025

Tournament details
- Host country: Namibia
- Dates: 4 – 13 July
- Teams: 8 (from 1 sub-confederation)
- Venues: 2 (in 1 host city)

Final positions
- Champions: South Africa (10th title)
- Runners-up: Malawi
- Third place: Zambia
- Fourth place: Angola

Tournament statistics
- Matches played: 16
- Goals scored: 44 (2.75 per match)
- Top scorer(s): (Malawi) Mwisho Mhango (4 goals)
- Best player: (Malawi) Mwisho Mhango
- Best goalkeeper: (South Africa) Solethu Radebe
- Fair play award: South Africa

The 2025 COSAFA U-20 Championship was the 30th edition of the COSAFA U-20 Youth Championship, the international youth football championship organised by COSAFA for the men's under-20 national teams of Southern Africa. The tournament doubled as the men's football competition for the AUSC Region 5 Youth Games Namibia 2025 and was hosted in Windhoek from 4 to 13 July 2025. A total of eight teams played in the tournament, with players born on or after 1 January 2005 eligible to participate.

South Africa were the defending champions, having won their ninth title in last year's edition. They successfully defended their title, finishing the tournament unbeaten.

== Participation ==
=== Participating teams ===
Note: All appearance statistics are counted starting from the 1999 edition, as limited information is available for the earlier years.

Team	App	Last	Previous best performance
Angola	21st	2024	Runners-up (2000, 2001, 2002)
Botswana	21st	2024	Third place (2009, 2013)
Eswatini	22nd	2024	Third place (1985, 1986, 1988, 1990)
Malawi	19th	2024	Runners-up (2003)
Namibia	19th	2024	Runners-up (2010, 2020)
South Africa	22nd	2024	Champions (2000, 2004, 2006, 2008, 2009, 2013, 2017, 2018, 2024)
Zambia	22nd	2024	Champions (1983, 1986, 1993, 1995, 1997, 1999, 2003, 2010, 2011, 2016, 2019, 2022)
Zimbabwe	20th	2024	Champions (1985, 1988, 1990, 2001, 2002, 2007)

Did not enter

- Comoros
- Lesotho
- Madagascar
- Mauritius
- Mozambique
- Seychelles

=== Draw ===
The tournament final draw took place on 27 April 2025.

The draw resulted in the following groups:

Group A
Pos	Team
A1	Namibia
A2	Angola
A3	Malawi
A4	Zimbabwe

Group B
Pos	Team
B1	South Africa
B2	Zambia
B3	Eswatini
B4	Botswana

== Officials ==
A total of 6 Referees, 6 Assistants were selected for the tournament.

Referees

- (Botswana) Hamilton Kebonang
- (Malawi) David Chinoko
- (Mozambique) António Chivavel
- (Namibia) Fillipus Nghilinganye
- (Zambia) Charles Ng'andwe
- (Zimbabwe) Owen Manenda

Assistant referees

- (Angola) Pedro Micolo
- (Mozambique) Macário Gaveto
- (Namibia) Klaus Bonifatius
- (Namibia) Nguvitjita Huirika
- (South Africa) Joseph Mohweleli
- (Zimbabwe) Tanatswa Masawi

== Group stage ==
All times are local, CAT (UTC+2). The match schedule was confirmed by COSAFA on 13 June 2025.

=== Group A ===
Pos	Team	Pld	W	D	L	GF	GA	GD	Pts	Qualification
1	Malawi	3	2	1	0	5	2	+3	7	Advance to knockout stage
2	Angola	3	2	1	0	4	1	+3	7	Advance to knockout stage
3	Namibia (H)	3	1	0	2	3	5	−2	3	
4	Zimbabwe	3	0	0	3	3	7	−4	0	

Source: COSAFA
Rules for classification: Tiebreakers
(H) Hosts
4 July 2025
12:00

Malawi	2–1	Zimbabwe
Mhango 25'; Chibika 73' (o.g.)	Report	Chakuchichi 58'

Hage Geingob Stadium, Windhoek
Referee: António Chivavel (Mozambique)
4 July 2025
15:00

Namibia	0–1	Angola
	Report	Cundula 14'

Hage Geingob Stadium, Windhoek
Referee: Charles Ng'andwe (Zambia)

6 July 2025
13:00

Angola	1–1	Malawi
Marcelo 45+4'	Report	Mhango 17'

Hage Geingob Stadium, Windhoek
Referee: Hamilton Kebonang (Botswana)
6 July 2025
16:00

Namibia	3–2	Zimbabwe
Kauzuu 3'; Naobeb 13', 73'	Report	Darkeni 23'; Kavendji 27' (o.g.)

Hage Geingob Stadium, Windhoek
Referee: David Chinoko (Malawi)

8 July 2025
16:00

Namibia	0–2	Malawi
	Report	Mithi 75'; Chisale 90+6'

Hage Geingob Stadium, Windhoek
Referee: Owen Manenda (Zimbabwe)
8 July 2025
16:00

Angola	2–0	Zimbabwe
Papusseco 2'; Panda 37'	Report

UNAM Sport Stadium, Windhoek
Referee: Fillipus Nghilinganye (Namibia)

=== Group B ===
Pos	Team	Pld	W	D	L	GF	GA	GD	Pts	Qualification
1	South Africa	3	2	1	0	8	3	+5	7	Advance to knockout stage
2	Zambia	3	2	1	0	7	3	+4	7	Advance to knockout stage
3	Botswana	3	1	0	2	3	5	−2	3	
4	Eswatini	3	0	0	3	1	8	−7	0	

Source: COSAFA
Rules for classification: Tiebreakers
5 July 2025
13:00

Eswatini	1–3	Botswana
Dube 80'	Report	Tshotlego 16' (pen.); Ngube 65'; Evans 89'

Hage Geingob Stadium, Windhoek
Referee: Fillipus Nghilinganye (Namibia)
5 July 2025
16:00

South Africa	3–3	Zambia
Bohloko 6'; Witbooi 17'; Mzimela 80'	Report	G. Phiri 7'; Simute 32'; Ndhlovu 44'

Hage Geingob Stadium, Windhoek
Referee: Owen Manenda (Zimbabwe)

7 July 2025
13:00

Zambia	3–0	Eswatini
G. Phiri 19'; Daka 27'; Chipelu 33'	Report

Hage Geingob Stadium, Windhoek
Referee: António Chivavel (Mozambique)
7 July 2025
16:00

South Africa	3–0	Botswana
Stevens 15'; Mokokosi 25'; Sekgoto 59'	Report

Hage Geingob Stadium, Windhoek
Referee: Charles Ng'andwe (Zambia)

9 July 2025
16:00

South Africa	2–0	Eswatini
Mendes 28'; Mhlongo 59'	Report

Hage Geingob Stadium, Windhoek
Referee: António Chivavel (Mozambique)
9 July 2025
16:00

Zambia	1–0	Botswana
Chimwemwe 80'	Report

UNAM Sport Stadium, Windhoek
Referee: David Chinoko (Malawi)

== Knockout stage ==
=== Bracket ===
Semi-finals
11 July
South Africa	2
Angola	0
11 July
Malawi	2
Zambia	1

Final
13 July
South Africa	3
Malawi	0
Third place
12 July
Angola	1 (4)
Zambia (p)	1 (5)

=== Semi-finals ===
11 July 2025
13:00

South Africa	2–0	Angola
Clemente 30' (o.g.); Mendes 64'	Report

UNAM Sport Stadium, Windhoek
Referee: David Chinoko (Malawi)

11 July 2025
16:00

Malawi	2–1	Zambia
Mhango 3', 70'	Report	Sibeene 40'

UNAM Sport Stadium, Windhoek
Referee: Fillipus Nghilinganye (Namibia)

=== Third place ===
12 July 2025
15:00

Angola	1–1	Zambia
Barraba 89' (pen.)	Report	Daka 14'
Penalties
Rosário (penalty scored); Marcelo (penalty scored); Barraba (penalty scored); Ivan (penalty missed); Papusseco (penalty scored)	4–5	(penalty scored) Daka; (penalty scored) R. Banda; (penalty scored) Simfukwe; (penalty scored) Sibeene; (penalty scored) Ndhlovu

UNAM Sport Stadium, Windhoek
Referee: António Chivavel (Mozambique)

=== Final ===
13 July 2025
14:00

South Africa	3–0	Malawi
Mzimela 5'; Mlondo 64'; Sekgoto 76'	Report

UNAM Sport Stadium, Windhoek
Referee: Owen Manenda (Zimbabwe)

== Goalscorers ==
There were 44 goals scored in 16 matches, for an average of 2.75 goals per match.

4 goals

- (Malawi) Mwisho Mhango

2 goals

- (Namibia) Rashid Naobeb
- (South Africa) Steven Mendes
- (South Africa) Khayalethu Mzimela
- (South Africa) Omphemetse Sekgoto
- (Zambia) Billy Daka
- (Zambia) Gabriel Phiri

1 goal

- (Angola) Barraba
- (Angola) Cundula
- (Angola) Marcelo Faustino
- (Angola) Luís Panda
- (Angola) Papusseco
- (Botswana) Irvin Evans
- (Botswana) Molwantwa Ngube
- (Botswana) Tumiso Tshotlego
- (Eswatini) Phiwayinkhosi Dube
- (Malawi) Clifford Chisale
- (Malawi) Lameck Mithi
- (Namibia) Suveree Kauzuu
- (South Africa) Neo Bohloko
- (South Africa) Thandanani Mhlongo
- (South Africa) Simphiwe Mlondo
- (South Africa) Bokamoso Mokokosi
- (South Africa) Selwyn Stevens
- (South Africa) Emile Witbooi
- (Zambia) Nkotami Chimwemwe
- (Zambia) Kelvin Chipelu
- (Zambia) Bongani Ndhlovu
- (Zambia) James Sibeene
- (Zambia) Mapalo Simute
- (Zimbabwe) Tadiwa Chakuchichi
- (Zimbabwe) Takudzwa Darkeni

1 own goal

- (Angola) Clemente Gonçalves (against South Africa)
- (Namibia) Mcheni Kavendji (against Zimbabwe)
- (Zimbabwe) Garie Chibika (against Malawi)

== See also ==
- 2025 COSAFA Under-17 Championship
- 2025 COSAFA U-20 Women's Championship
