= Takalani Mazhamba =

South African soccer player (born 2007)

Personal information
- Date of birth: 30 May 2007 (age 19)
- Place of birth: Venda, Limpopo, South Africa
- Height: 1.82 m (6 ft 0 in)
- Position: Goalkeeper

Team information
- Current team: Kaizer Chiefs
- Number: 41

Youth career
- 2020–2025: Kaizer Chiefs Development

Senior career*
Years	Team	Apps	(Gls)
2025–	Kaizer Chiefs	1	(0)

International career
2024–	South Africa U20		
Medal record
Representing South Africa
U-20 Africa Cup of Nations
Gold medal – first place	2025 Morocco
COSAFA U-20 Youth Championship
Gold medal – first place	2024 Mozambique
Gold medal – first place	2026 Mozambique
- * Club domestic league appearances and goals

Takalani Mazhamba (born 30 May 2007) is a South African professional soccer player who plays as a goalkeeper for Premier Soccer League club Kaizer Chiefs and the South Africa under-20 squad.

== Playing career ==
Mazahamba joined the Kaizer Chiefs Academy at the age of 13, progressing through the club's youth structures and competing in the Gauteng Development League and PSL Reserve League. In 2024, he gained attention after saving three penalties in the ENGEN Knockout Challenge against Randburg AFC, helping Kaizer Chiefs reach the final, which they went on to win.

He made his senior debut for Kaizer Chiefs on 23 May 2026 in a Betway Premiership match against Chippa United. At 18 years, 11 months and 23 days, Mazahamba became the youngest goalkeeper to debut for Kaizer Chiefs in the PSL era, surpassing the previous record held by Itumeleng Khune, who debuted at age 20.

== International career ==
He was selected for South Africa's under‑20 squads for both the 2024 and 2026 COSAFA U‑20 Championships. In the 2026 edition, he featured in all five matches, conceding only three goals and was named Goalkeeper of the Tournament. He also formed part of the squad that won South Africa's maiden U‑20 Africa Cup of Nations title in 2025.

== Personal life ==
Mazhamba was born in Venda, Limpopo and grew up in Soweto, Gauteng. He is of Venda heritage.

== Honours ==
South Africa

- U-20 Africa Cup of Nations: 2025
- COSAFA U-20 Youth Championship: 2024, 2026

Kaizer Chiefs Academy

- ENGEN Knockout Challenge: 2024

Individual

- 2026 COSAFA U-20 Youth Championship: Goalkeeper of the Tournament
