= Tadiwa Chakuchichi =

Zimbabwean footballer (born 2009)

Personal information
- Full name: Tadiwanashe Chakuchichi
- Date of birth: 1 June 2009 (age 17)
- Place of birth: Harare, Zimbabwe
- Position: Winger

Team information
- Current team: Scottland

Senior career*
Years	Team	Apps	(Gls)
2025–	Scottland	8	(2)

International career
2025–	Zimbabwe U17		
2025–	Zimbabwe U20		
2025–	Zimbabwe	1	(0)
- * Club domestic league appearances and goals

Tadiwanashe Chakuchichi (born 1 June 2009) is a Zimbabwean footballer who plays as a winger for the Zimbabwe Premier Soccer League club Scottland F.C.

Chakuchichi is the youngest player to ever play in the Africa Cup of Nations, making his senior debut in 2025.

== Early life ==
Chakuchichi was born on 1 June 2009 in Harare, Zimbabwe. Growing up, he attended St. John's College in Zimbabwe.

== Club career ==
In 2025, Chakuchichi joined Zimbabwe Premier Soccer League side Scottland FC. He made his debut for the club in a 3–0 league win against Bikita Minerals. That season, Chakuchichi would help Scottland win the league title.

== International career ==
In July 2025, Chakuchichi was a part of the Zimbabwe U20 national team for the 2025 COSAFA U-20 Championship. He scored a goal in the group stages against Malawi, however the goal would only be a consolation for Zimbabwe as they lost the game 2–1.

During September 2025, he played for the U-17 team at the 2025 COSAFA Under-17 Championship and was subsequently selected for the Afcon 2025 senior team.

Chakuchichi played his first senior match for Zimbabwe at the AFCON 2025 against South Africa, coming off the bench as a substitute on 29 December 2025. After the match, he set a record by becoming the youngest player to ever play in the Africa Cup of Nations.
