= Liberty Chakoroma =

Zimbabwean footballer (born 1994)

Personal information
- Date of birth: 28 February 1994 (age 32)
- Place of birth: Mutare, Zimbabwe
- Position: Centre-back

Team information
- Current team: Chicken Inn

Senior career*
| Years | Team | Apps | (Gls) |
| 2013–2015 | Buffaloes | | |
| 2015–2016 | Free State Stars | 1 | (0) |
| 2016–2018 | Ngezi Platinum | | |
| 2019– | Chicken Inn | | |

International career^{‡}
- Zimbabwe U20
- Zimbabwe U23
| 2014– | Zimbabwe | 15 | (0) |
- * Club domestic league appearances and goals as of 17 March 2019 ‡ National team caps and goals as of 17 March 2019

Liberty Chakoroma (born 28 February 1994) is a Zimbabwean footballer who plays as a defender for Chicken Inn F.C. and the Zimbabwe national football team.

He played in the 2013 COSAFA U-20 Cup, scoring against Botswana. He also played with the under-23 squad in the 2015 African Games.
