= Nhlakanipho Ntuli =

South African soccer player

Personal information
- Date of birth: 10 February 1996 (age 30)
- Place of birth: Durban, South Africa
- Position: Midfielder

Team information
- Current team: Dalkurd FF
- Number: 6

Youth career
- Ajax
- PSV
- Orlando Pirates

Senior career*
Years	Team	Apps	(Gls)
2013–2016	FC Twente	0	(0)
2013–2014	→ Orlando Pirates (loan)	0	(0)
2014–2015	→ Jong FC Twente	27	(0)
2017	Free State Stars	2	(0)
2019–2021	Sportis Łochowo		
2021–2022	FC Košice	23	(2)
2023–	Dalkurd FF	21	(0)

International career
2012	South Africa U17		
- South Africa U20
- * Club domestic league appearances and goals as of 16 November 2023

Nhlakanipho Ntuli (born 10 February 1996) is a South African professional soccer player who plays as a midfielder for Swedish side Dalkurd FF. He is former player of Free State Stars

== Club career ==
Ntuli played youth football for Ajax, PSV and Orlando Pirates. He joined FC Twente in June 2013, and was loaned back to Orlando Pirates until he turned 18, re-joining the Dutch club in February 2014. He signed a five-year professional contract with Twente in April 2014. He made his senior debut for Jong FC Twente in the 2014–15 season.

== International career ==
Ntuli received his first call-up to the South African national team in August 2014. At the youth level he played in the 2012 COSAFA U-17 Zone VI Tournament, 2013 African U-17 Championship qualifiers, the 2013 COSAFA U-20 Cup and 2015 African U-20 Championship qualifiers.

== Personal life ==
Ntuli has spoken of his friendship with fellow player Kamohelo Mokotjo.
