= Khensane =

Mozambican footballer (born 2009)

Personal information
- Full name: Khensane Mpusane Eustáquio Machel
- Date of birth: 30 January 2009 (age 17)
- Place of birth: Belo Horizonte, Brazil
- Height: 1.74 m (5 ft 9 in)
- Position: Defensive midfielder

Team information
- Current team: Coritiba

Youth career
- Cruzeiro
- 2023–2025: Coritiba

Senior career*
Years	Team	Apps	(Gls)
2025–	Coritiba	1	(0)

International career^{‡}
2026–	Mozambique U17	2	(1)
2026–	Mozambique U20		
- * Club domestic league appearances and goals as of 23:04, 22 May 2025 (UTC) ‡ National team caps and goals as of 22 November 2026

Khensane Mpusane Eustaquio Machel (born 30 January 2009), known as Khensane, is a footballer who plays as a defensive midfielder for Coritiba. Born in Brazil, he was called up to the Mozambique national under-20 team.

== Early and personal life ==
Born in Belo Horizonte to a Mozambican father and a Brazilian mother. His name, picked by his father, translates to Grateful Warrior.

As a child, he was registered to an acting and modelling agency.

== Club career ==
Khensane began playing football with his grandfather in their back garden. He played on the dirt fields of Minas Gerais, where he played at a number of footballing schools, and joined the academy of Cruzeiro as a child. Starting out as a defender, he also played in goal, before settling as a defensive midfielder due to his height.

Having progressed through the academy of Cruzeiro, he trialled with Athletico Paranaense at the age of fourteen, but would instead join Coritiba. He won the Best Player award at the under-15 Copa Limonta Vitarit Grass in December 2024. Clips of him at the tournament drew national attention, and in January of the following year he signed his first professional contract with the club, a deal running until the end of 2028.

On 2 February 2025 he made his professional debut against Cianorte in the Campeonato Paranaense. With the score at 1–1, he replaced Geovane Meurer, but was unable to prevent Coritiba slipping to a 4–1 defeat. In making his debut, he became the second-youngest player in the history of the club, bettered only by Carlos Leopoldo Glaser, who made his debut in 1915.

== International career ==
Eligible to represent Brazil and Mozambique, the Mozambican Football Federation contacted Khensane in May 2025 in the hope of convincing him to represent them at international level. Two months later, he trained with the Brazil national under-17 team.

Khensane accepted to represent Mozambique at the 2026 COSAFA U-20 Cup.

== Style of play ==
A defensive midfielder, Khensane has drawn comparisons to French international footballer Paul Pogba, due to their similar technique and ball control. Khensane himself has said that, while he "liked watching Pogba" at the 2018 FIFA World Cup, he takes inspiration from former Brazilian international Ronaldinho, stating "I watch his videos and I like to try to replicate him". He has also listed Neymar and Vinícius Júnior as two of his footballing idols.

== Career statistics ==
=== Club ===
As of 22 May 2025.

Appearances and goals by club, season and competition
Club	Season	League			State League		Cup (Note: Includes Copa do Brasil)		Other		Total	
Club	Season	Division	Apps	Goals	Apps	Goals	Apps	Goals	Apps	Goals	Apps	Goals
Coritiba	2025	Série B	0	0	1 (Note: Appearances in the Campeonato Paranaense)	0	0	0	0	0	1	0
Career total			0	0	1	0	0	0	0	0	1	0
