= Terdius Uiseb =

Namibian footballer

Personal information
- Full name: Terdius Georome Uiseb
- Date of birth: 8 May 1994 (age 32)
- Place of birth: Windhoek, Namibia
- Position: Forward

Team information
- Current team: Township Rollers
- Number: 9

Senior career*
| Years | Team | Apps | (Gls) |
| 2013–2016 | Orlando Pirates | | |
| 2016–2017 | Milano United | 13 | (3) |
| 2017–2018 | Stellenbosch | 4 | (1) |
| 2018 | Orlando Pirates | | |
| 2019–2021 | United Africa Tigers | | |
| 2021–2022 | Al Tahaddy | | |
| 2022– | Township Rollers | | |

International career^{‡}
| 2015– | Namibia | 4 | (0) |
- * Club domestic league appearances and goals as of 00:52, 13 December 2022 (UTC) ‡ National team caps and goals as of 19:38, 9 February 2022 (UTC)

Terdius Uiseb (born 8 May 1994) is a Namibian footballer who plays for Township Rollers of the Botswana Premier League.

== Club career ==
In July 2016 Uiseb left Orlando Pirates following the 2016 season which saw him become the Namibia Premier League's top scorer with 27 goals. He then signed for Milano United of South Africa's National First Division. After scoring three goals in 13 appearances for the club, he moved on to league rivals Stellenbosch the following year. He saw limited action with the club and scored one goal in four appearances. Prior to joining Milano United, Uiseb had signed a three-year deal with giants Orlando Pirates F.C. of Soweto but was unable to appear for the club because it had too many foreign players on its roster.

After leaving South Africa he returned to Namibia and had another stint with Orlando Pirates S.C. before joining United Africa Tigers in 2019. In October 2021 it was announced that he had signed a one-year contract with Al Tahaddy Sports Club of the Libyan Premier League following a trial with the club. With the move Uiseb became the first Namibian to play in Libya.

In September 2022 Uiseb joined sixteen-time Botswana champions Township Rollers on a two-year contract.

== International career ==
In 2012 Uiseb was part of Namibia's national under-20 team that competed in a tournament in Ghana. The same year he was part of Namibia's roster for 2013 African U-20 Championship qualification and a triangular U17 tournament also featuring Westphalia and South Africa in Walvis Bay. Uiseb went on to score Namibia's only two goals in the tournament as the nation drew 2–2 with South Africa. It was at these tournaments that he solidified his place in the national team setup. The following year he played in the 2013 COSAFA U-20 Cup and scored in Namibia's 1–1 draw with Zambia in the Group Stage.

Uiseb went on to make his senior international debut on 6 November 2015 in a friendly against Malawi. The following year he represented Namibia in the 2016 COSAFA Cup.

=== International career statistics ===
As of match played 8 June 2016

Namibia national team
| Year | Apps | Goals |
|---|---|---|
| 2015 | 1 | 0 |
| 2016 | 3 | 0 |
| Total | 4 | 0 |
