= Carlos Rusere =

Zimbabwean footballer (born 1994)

Personal information
- Full name: Carlos Rodwell Rusere
- Date of birth: 5 December 1994 (age 31)
- Place of birth: Harare, Zimbabwe
- Height: 1.77 m (5 ft 10 in)
- Position: Midfielder

Youth career
- Dynamos

Senior career*
Years	Team	Apps	(Gls)
2014–2017	Dynamos		
2014	→ DC Academy (loan)		
2018	Shabanie Mine		
2018	Nichrut		
2019	CAPS United		

International career
- Zimbabwe U20
2015–?	Zimbabwe U23	2	(0)
2014–2025	Zimbabwe	5	(1)
- * Club domestic league appearances and goals

Carlos Rodwell Rusere (born 5 December 1994) is a Zimbabwean footballer who played as a midfielder. He made five appearances for the Zimbabwe national team scoring once.

== Club career ==
Rusere started his career in the youth ranks at Dynamos before being promoted into the senior squad and subsequently loaned out to second tier outfit DC Academy. Rusere returned to Dynamos at the end of 2015. He was released by Dynamos at the end of 2017. Ahead of the 2018 campaign, Rusere joined Shabanie Mine. However, months later he was signed by Nichrut.

On 1 February 2019, Rusere joined CAPS United. He was released at the end of the year.

== International career ==
Rusere has made six appearances for the Zimbabwe national team and scored once. Before entering the senior international fold, Rusere was a part of the Zimbabwe U23s and started in a 2–1 defeat away to Nigeria U23s. He also played in the 2013 COSAFA U-20 Cup, scoring against Botswana.

== Career statistics ==
As of 6 May 2018

National team	Year	Apps	Goals
Zimbabwe	2015	4	1
Zimbabwe	2016	2	0
Total		6	1

As of 6 May 2018 Scores and results list Zimbabwe's goal tally first.

Goal	Date	Venue	Opponent	Score	Result	Competition
1	17 May 2015	Moruleng Stadium, Rustenburg, South Africa	Mauritius	1–0	2–0	2015 COSAFA Cup
