= Francis Okombi =

Congolese footballer

Personal information
- Full name: Francis Vance Bogart Okombi
- Date of birth: 15 October 1996 (age 30)
- Place of birth: Brazzaville, R. Congo
- Height: 1.74 m (5 ft 9 in)
- Position: Defender

Team information
- Current team: CSMD Diables Noirs

Senior career*
Years	Team	Apps	(Gls)
2016	Étoile du Congo		
2017	CARA Brazzaville		
2018–	CSMD Diables Noirs		

International career
- Republic of the Congo U20
2017–	Republic of the Congo	7	(0)
- * Club domestic league appearances and goals

Francis Okombi (born 15 October 1996) is a Congolese footballer who plays as a defender for CSMD Diables Noirs.

== International career ==
At the youth level he played in 2015 African U-20 Championship qualifiers, scoring against Niger.
