= Mwisho Mhango =

Malawian footballer

Personal information
- Date of birth: 15 September 2007 (age 19)
- Place of birth: Lilongwe, Malawi
- Position: Midfielder

Team information
- Current team: Hannover 96
- Number: 21

Youth career
- 2021–2025: Ascent Soccer Academy
- 2025–: Hannover 96

International career^{‡}
Years	Team	Apps	(Gls)
2022	Malawi U17	3	(1)
2024–2025	Malawi U20	8	(5)
2026–	Malawi	2	(0)
- ‡ National team caps and goals as of 16:58, 10 June 2026 (UTC)

Mwisho Mhango (born 15 September 2007) is a Malawian professional footballer who plays as a midfielder for Hannover 96 in the 2. Bundesliga and the Malawi national team.

== Club career ==
Mhango developed at Ascent Soccer Academy, a full-time residential football programme based in Lilongwe. His performances at the 2025 COSAFA U-20 Championship, where he scored five goals, won the Golden Boot and was named Player of the Tournament while helping Malawi reach the semi-finals, attracted international interest.

On 27 September 2025, upon turning 18, Mhango signed a five-year contract with 2. Bundesliga side Hannover 96. Under FIFA regulations preventing non-EU players from signing professional contracts in Europe before the age of 18, the transfer had been delayed until his birthday. He began a three-month integration programme at the club's academy, living in the boarding school and training with the professional squad, with first-team eligibility from January 2026.

== International career ==
Mhango was first called up to the Malawi under-17 national team at the age of 14. He went on to become a key figure for the Malawi under-20 side, featuring at the 2024 COSAFA U-20 Cup and 2025 COSAFA U-20 Championship.

On 28 March 2026, Mhango made his senior international debut for the senior Malawi national team, starting in a 0–0 draw against Zambia at the 2026 Four Nations Football Tournament.

== Honours ==
Individual

- 2025 COSAFA U-20 Championship top scorer
- 2025 COSAFA U-20 Championship best player
