= Equatorial Guinea national under-20 football team =

National under-20 association football team representing Equatorial Guinea

Equatorial Guinea U-20
- Nickname: Nzalang Nacional (National Thunder)
- Association: Federación Ecuatoguineana de Fútbol
- Confederation: CAF (Africa)
- Sub-confederation: UNIFFAC (Central Africa)
- Head coach: Óscar Eyang Mvondo Nsang
- Most caps: Alejandro Nza Ekang Owono
- Top scorer: Héctor Mbarga Obiang Nguema
- Home stadium: Estadio de Malabo
- FIFA code: EQG
First colours	Second colours

U-20 Africa Cup of Nations
- Appearances: 1 (first in 1981)
- Best result: Round 2 (1981)

FIFA U-20 World Cup
- Appearances: None

The Equatorial Guinea national under-20 football team, nicknamed the National Thunder, represents Equatorial Guinea in international youth football competitions. Its primary role is the development of players in preparation for the senior national team. The team competes in a variety of competitions, including the biennial FIFA U-20 World Cup and the U-20 Africa Cup of Nations, which is the top competitions for this age group.

== Current squad ==
The following players were called up for the 2025 U-20 Africa Cup of Nations qualification (Central Zone Group A) matches against Congo and DR Congo on 26 and 28 September 2024, respectively.

Caps and goals updated as of 28 September 2024 after the match against DR Congo.

No.	Pos.	Player	Date of birth (age)	Caps	Goals	Club
1	GK	Melchor Krohnert	1 July 2008 (age 18)	0	0	(Equatoguinean Football Federation) Cano Sport
13	GK	Federico Ndong		2	0	(Equatoguinean Football Federation) Bata City Sport
2	DF	Genaro Ndong		2	0	(Equatoguinean Football Federation) EDSA
3	DF	Baldomero Nsue		2	0	(Equatoguinean Football Federation) Sporting Academy GE
4	DF	Rafael Nguema (captain)	22 February 2006 (age 20)	2	0	(Equatoguinean Football Federation) Deportivo Mongomo
5	DF	José Daniel Ondo	19 December 2005 (age 20)	2	0	(Equatoguinean Football Federation) Cano Sport
8	DF	Fernando Edu		2	0	(Equatoguinean Football Federation) Real Teka
12	DF	Feliciano Ondo		0	0	(Equatoguinean Football Federation) EDSA
7	MF	Bonifacio Edu	19 June 2006 (age 20)	2	0	(Equatoguinean Football Federation) Cano Sport
14	MF	Luciano Ndong		1	0	(Equatoguinean Football Federation) Bata City Sport
15	MF	Leoncio Edjang	27 June 2005 (age 21)	2	0	(Equatoguinean Football Federation) 15 de Agosto
16	MF	Wenceslao Nguema		2	0	(Equatoguinean Football Federation) Fundación Bata
18	MF	Daniel Ekobo		0	0	(Equatoguinean Football Federation) Atlético Semu
19	MF	Benjamín Owono		1	0	(Equatoguinean Football Federation) Academia Bata City
6	FW	Enrique Iyanga	10 January 2008 (age 18)	2	0	(Equatoguinean Football Federation) Cano Sport
9	FW	Justo Eworo	27 December 2006 (age 19)	2	1	(Equatoguinean Football Federation) Cano Sport
10	FW	Juan Carlos Muendji	11 August 2005 (age 21)	1	0	(Equatoguinean Football Federation) Deportivo Ebenezer
11	FW	Antonio Esimi	8 December 2005 (age 20)	2	0	(Equatoguinean Football Federation) Cano Sport
17	FW	Cedrigo Abogo	14 July 2006 (age 20)	2	0	(Equatoguinean Football Federation) Malabo United
20	FW	Antonio Melchor Ndong		2	0	(Equatoguinean Football Federation) EDSA

== Competitive record ==
=== FIFA U-20 World Cup record ===
FIFA U-20 World Cup record
Year	Round	GP	W	D^{1}	L	GS	GA
(Tunisia) 1977	Did not qualify						
(Japan) 1979	Did not qualify						
(Australia) 1981	Did not qualify						
(Mexico) 1983	Did not qualify						
(Soviet Union) 1985	Did not qualify						
(Chile) 1987	Did not qualify						
(Saudi Arabia) 1989	Did not qualify						
(Portugal) 1991	Did not qualify						
(Australia) 1993	Did not qualify						
(Qatar) 1995	Did not qualify						
(Malaysia) 1997	Did not qualify						
(Nigeria) 1999	Did not qualify						
(Argentina) 2001	Did not qualify						
(United Arab Emirates) 2003	Did not qualify						
(Netherlands) 2005	Did not qualify						
(Canada) 2007	Did not qualify						
(Egypt) 2009	Did not qualify						
(Colombia) 2011	Did not qualify						
(Turkey) 2013	Did not qualify						
(New Zealand) 2015	Did not qualify						
(South Korea) 2017	Did not qualify						
(Poland) 2019	Did not qualify						
(Argentina) 2023	Did not qualify						
(Chile) 2025	Did not qualify						
(Azerbaijan) (Uzbekistan) 2027	To be determined						
Total	0/23	0	0	0	0	0	0

^{1}Draws include knockout matches decided on penalty kicks.

== See also ==
- Equatorial Guinea national football team
- Equatorial Guinea national under-17 football team
