= Alakhe Mdluli =

Liswati footballer

Personal information
- Full name: Alakhe Thato Mdluli
- Place of birth: Eswatini
- Positions: Midfielder; forward

Team information
- Current team: AmaZulu

Youth career
- 2024–: AmaZulu

International career^{‡}
Years	Team	Apps	(Gls)
2024–	Eswatini U20	3	(2)
2025–	Eswatini	2	(0)
- ‡ National team caps and goals as of 00:35, 13 June 2025 (UTC)

Alakhe Mdluli is a Liswati footballer who plays for the reserve side of South African Premiership club AmaZulu and the Eswatini national team.

== Club career ==
Mduli was captain of his school team at Glenwood High School. He led the team to back-to-back KwaZulu-Natal High Schools Football League Coast Championships in 2023 and 2024. Mdluli won the Man of the Match honours for his performance in the final against Queensburgh High School in 2024. That season, Glenwood also won the Primo Big 10 championship with Mdluli as the tournament's joint top scorer.

Capable of playing as both a midfielder or forward, Mdluli is a product of the Eswatini Football Association Build-It Under-13 Tournament. He joined the academy of South African Premiership club AmaZulu F.C. in July 2024. In September 2024, he made his debut for the club's reserve team in a PSL Reserve League match against the second team of Orlando Pirates.

== International career ==
Mdluli began representing Eswatini at under-20 level while in grade nine. He was later included in the nation's squad for the 2024 COSAFA U-20 Cup. He was one of four foreign-based players in the squad. Mdluli tallied two goals and an assist in Eswatini's first match of the competition, a 5–4 victory over hosts Mozambique, earning Man of the Match honors. Despite the victory, Eswatini did not advance beyond the Group Stage.

Mdluli was called up to the senior national team for the first time in June 2025 for the 2025 COSAFA Cup.

=== International career statistics ===
As of match played 11 June 2025

Eswatini national team
Year	Apps	Goals
2025	2	0
Total	2	0
