= Jody Ah Shene =

South African soccer player (born 2005)

Personal information
- Full name: Jody Lee Ah Shene
- Date of birth: 1 February 2005 (age 21)
- Place of birth: Ocean View, Cape Town, South Africa
- Height: 1.78 m (5 ft 10 in)
- Position: Forward

Team information
- Current team: Cape Town City

Youth career
- Cape Town City

Senior career*
Years	Team	Apps	(Gls)
2024–	Cape Town City		

International career
2024–2025	South Africa U20	12	(4)
- * Club domestic league appearances and goals

Jody Lee Ah Shene (born 1 February 2005) is a South African soccer player who plays as a forward for National First Division side Cape Town City.

== Club career ==
=== Cape Town City ===
Ah Shene played for Cape Town City in the PSL Reserve League after being scouted at the Engen Knockout Challenge. In 2025 the team was relegated to the National First Division with the player choosing to stay at the club instead of making a move to Mamelodi Sundowns.

== Youth international career ==
Ah Shene competed with the South Africa U-20 team at the 2024 COSAFA U-20 Cup and helped qualify for the 2025 U-20 Africa Cup of Nations. He was the top goal scorer with 4 goals.

He helped the side win their maiden U-20 Africa Cup of Nations scoring the opening goal in a 4–1 over Sierra Leone in the group stages.

== Honours ==
South Africa U20

- U-20 Africa Cup of Nations: 2025
- COSAFA U-20 Challenge Cup: 2024

Individual

- 2024 COSAFA U-20 Cup: Top Goal Scorer (4 goals)
