= Wilfried Nathan Douala =

Cameroonian footballer (born 2006)

Nathan Douala
Personal information
- Full name: Wilfried Nathan Douala
- Date of birth: 15 May 2006 (age 20)
- Place of birth: Douala, Cameroon
- Height: 1.72 m (5 ft 8 in)
- Position: Midfielder

Team information
- Current team: Al-Merrikh SC
- Number: 8

Youth career
- –2023: Donlap

Senior career*
| Years | Team | Apps | (Gls) |
| 2023–2025 | Victoria United | | |
| 2025–2026 | Canon Yaoundé | | |
| 2026– | Al-Merrikh SC | | |

International career^{‡}
| 2024– | Cameroon U-20 | 3 | (1) |
- * Club domestic league appearances and goals ‡ National team caps and goals as of 26 September 2024

Wilfried Nathan Douala (born 15 May 2006) is a Cameroonian professional footballer who plays as a midfielder for Sudan Premier League club Al-Merrikh SC.

== Club career ==
Born in Douala, Wilfried Nathan Douala was a youth product of Donlap. In 2023, he was transferred to Victoria United, a team based in Limbé. In April 2024, he scored the equalizer goal to help Victoria United draw 2–2 against Stade Renard, thus helping his team officially win the Elite One title for the first time in their history.

In July 2025, Douala joined Elite One fellow Canon Yaoundé, signing a one-year contract with the club with a signing bonus of 3 million CFA francs.

== International career ==
In 2024, he was named in Cameroon national team's final squad to participate in the 2023 Africa Cup of Nations. Being the youngest member of the squad, he didn't make any appearance during the tournament.

== Age fraud scandal ==
His call-up for the 2023 Africa Cup of Nations sparked controversy over his age, with some expressing doubts about whether he was really 17 years old, because of his appearance that is older than his age. On 11 March 2024, the French newspaper Le Monde published an investigation, showing that Douala's name is actually Alexandre Bardelli and he would be at least 23 years old. Later in the month, Douala was included among the 62 players suspended by the Cameroonian Football Federation due to problems of age fraud and double identity, but he was later cleared by the Federation.

== Honours ==
Victoria United

- Elite One: 2023–24
