= Shakeel April =

South African soccer player (born 2005)

Personal information
- Date of birth: 1 December 2005 (age 20)
- Place of birth: Parkwood, Cape Town, South Africa
- Height: 1.68 m (5 ft 6 in)
- Position: Midfielder

Team information
- Current team: Stellenbosch F.C.
- Number: 12

Youth career
- –2023: Ubuntu Football Academy
- 2023–2024: Cape Town City

Senior career*
Years	Team	Apps	(Gls)
2024–	Cape Town City		
2026–	Stellenbosch F.C.		

International career
2024–2025	South Africa U20		
- * Club domestic league appearances and goals

Shakeel April (born 1 December 2005) is a South African soccer player who plays as a midfielder for South African Premiership side Stellensboch F.C.

== Club career ==
=== Cape Town City ===
April signed his first professional contract with Cape Town City. He is a product of their academy after signing for the club's academy in 2023 from Ubuntu Football Academy.

In January 2026 he signed for Stellensboch F.C..

== International career ==
April competed with the South Africa U-20 team at the 2024 COSAFA U-20 Cup and helped qualify for the 2025 U-20 Africa Cup of Nations.

He helped the side win their maiden U-20 Africa Cup of Nations scoring the winning goal in a 1–0 over Tanzania in the group stages. He ended the tournament with one goal and two assists.

== Honours ==
South Africa U20

- U-20 Africa Cup of Nations: 2025
- COSAFA U-20 Challenge Cup: 2024
