= Ayabulela Konqobe Magqwaka =

South African soccer player

Personal information
- Full name: Ayabulela Konqobe Magqwaka
- Date of birth: 12 January 1996 (age 30)
- Place of birth: Cape Town, South Africa
- Height: 1.73 m (5 ft 8 in)
- Position: Midfielder

Team information
- Current team: Chippa United
- Number: 24

Youth career
- Cultural Roots
- Vasco da Gama
- Ajax Cape Town

Senior career*
| Years | Team | Apps | (Gls) |
| 2014–2016 | Ajax Cape Town | 0 | (0) |
| 2015 | → SuperSport United (loan) | 2 | (0) |
| 2015–2016 | → AmaZulu (loan) | 14 | (1) |
| 2016–2017 | Thanda Royal Zulu | 29 | (0) |
| 2017 | AmaZulu | 0 | (0) |
| 2017–2018 | Chippa United | 17 | (0) |
| 2018–2019 | AmaZulu | 1 | (0) |
| 2019–2020 | Steenberg United | 12 | (0) |
| 2020 | Ekenäs IF | 22 | (6) |
| 2021– | Chippa United | 76 | (3) |
| 2022 | → Cape Town All Stars (loan) | 9 | (0) |

International career^{‡}
| 2015 | South Africa U20 | 2 | (0) |
| | South Africa U23 | 1 | (0) |
| 2021– | South Africa | 3 | (0) |
- * Club domestic league appearances and goals as of 4 January 2026 ‡ National team caps and goals as of 16 July 2021

Ayabulela Konqobe Magqwaka (born 12 January 1996) is a South African football (soccer) midfielder who plays for Chippa United.

== Early life career ==
He hails from Gugulethu on the Cape Flats.

== Club career ==
Besides his native South Africa, Konqobe Magqwaka has played in Finland for Ekenäs IF (EIF) in the second-tier Ykkönen.

== International career ==
He made his debut for South Africa national soccer team on 13 July 2021 in a 2021 COSAFA Cup game against Lesotho. South Africa won the tournament.

== Honours ==
Chippa United

- Nedbank Cup runner-up: 2020–21

== Career statistics ==
As of 27 November 2024.

Appearances and goals by club, season and competition
| Club | Season | League | | | Cup (Note: Includes Nedbank Cup and Suomen Cup) | | Other | | Total | |
| Club | Season | Division | Apps | Goals | Apps | Goals | Apps | Goals | Apps | Goals |
|---|---|---|---|---|---|---|---|---|---|---|
| SuperSport United (loan) | 2014–15 | South African Premiership | 2 | 0 | 0 | 0 | – | | 2 | 0 |
| AmaZulu (loan) | 2015–16 | NFD | 14 | 1 | 1 | 0 | – | | 15 | 1 |
| Thanda Royal Zulu | 2016–17 | NFD | 29 | 0 | 0 | 0 | – | | 29 | 0 |
| Chippa United | 2017–18 | South African Premiership | 17 | 0 | 1 | 1 | 2 (Note: Includes Carling Knockout Cup) | 0 | 20 | 1 |
| AmaZulu | 2018–19 | South African Premiership | 1 | 0 | 0 | 0 | – | | 1 | 0 |
| Steenberg United | 2019–20 | NFD | 12 | 0 | 1 | 0 | – | | 13 | 0 |
| Ekenäs IF | 2020 | Ykkönen | 22 | 6 | 5 | 1 | – | | 27 | 7 |
| Chippa United | 2020–21 | South African Premiership | 12 | 0 | 4 | 0 | – | | 16 | 0 |
| Chippa United | 2021–22 | South African Premiership | 0 | 0 | 0 | 0 | – | | 0 | 0 |
| Chippa United | 2022–23 | South African Premiership | 11 | 0 | 1 | 0 | – | | 12 | 0 |
| Chippa United | 2023–24 | South African Premiership | 21 | 1 | 2 | 0 | 1 | 0 | 24 | 1 |
| Chippa United | 2024–25 | South African Premiership | 8 | 1 | 0 | 0 | 1 | 0 | 9 | 1 |
| Chippa United | Total | | 52 | 2 | 7 | 0 | 2 | 0 | 61 | 3 |
| Cape Town All Stars (loan) | 2021–22 | NFD | 9 | 0 | 1 | 0 | – | | 10 | 0 |
| Career total | | | 158 | 9 | 16 | 2 | 3 | 0 | 178 | 11 |
