= Larry Bwalya =

Zambian footballer

Personal information
- Date of birth: 29 May 1995 (age 31)
- Place of birth: Kitwe, Zambia
- Height: 1.77 m (5 ft 10 in)
- Position: Midfielder

Team information
- Current team: Napsa Stars

Senior career*
Years	Team	Apps	(Gls)
2014–2017	Zanaco		
2017–2020	Power Dynamos		
2020–2022	Simba		
2022–2023	AmaZulu	18	(1)
2023–2024	Sekhukhune United	10	(1)
2024–	Napsa Stars		

International career^{‡}
2018–	Zambia	18	(1)
- * Club domestic league appearances and goals as of 12 October 2024 ‡ National team caps and goals as of 9 July 2023

Larry Bwalya (born 29 May 1995), also known as Rally Bwalya, is a Zambian professional footballer who plays as a midfielder for Napsa Stars and the Zambia national team.

== Club career ==
Bwalya signed with Simba S.C. on 15 August 2020 on a three-year deal. The central midfielder has appeared in two matches during the 2020–21 CAF Champions League competition, starting matches against F.C. Platinum on 6 Jan 2021, and in the opening group stage match against AS Vita Club.

He moved on to Sekhukhune United in the summer of 2023. In 2024 he was reported as joining Napsa Stars.

== International goals ==
No.	Date	Venue	Opponent	Score	Result	Competition
1.	17 November 2022	HaMoshava Stadium, Petah Tikva, Israel	Israel	2–2	2–4	Friendly
