= 2024 COSAFA U-20 Cup =

2024 COSAFA Under-20 Cup
Tournament details
- Host country: Mozambique
- City: Matola
- Dates: 26 September–5 October
- Teams: 12 (from 1 sub-confederation)
- Venue: Estádio da Matola

Final positions
- Champions: South Africa (9th title)
- Runners-up: Zambia

Tournament statistics
- Matches played: 18
- Goals scored: 55 (3.06 per match)
- Top scorer(s): (South Africa) Jody Ah Shene (4 goals)
- Best player: (South Africa) Shandre Campbell
- Best goalkeeper: (South Africa) Fletcher Smythe-Lowe
- Fair play award: Zambia

The 2024 COSAFA U-20 Cup was the 29th edition of the COSAFA U-20 Challenge Cup, an international youth football tournament open to national associations of the COSAFA region. It took place between 26 September and 5 October 2024 in Mozambique. This competition served as the COSAFA qualifiers for the 2025 U-20 Africa Cup of Nations.

South Africa defeated defending champions Zambia 2-0 in the final. Both finalists qualified for the 2025 U-20 Africa Cup of Nations. South Africa scored 16 goals in the five matches played, with zero goals conceded against them.

== Participating teams ==
The following twelve teams contested the tournament.

| Team | Appearances | Previous best performance |
|---|---|---|
| Angola | 29th | Runner-up (2000, 2001, 2002, 2011) |
| Botswana | 22nd | 3rd Place (2009, 2011) |
| Comoros | 5th | Group stage (2013, 2016, 2019, 2020) |
| Eswatini | 29th | Champion (2020) |
| Lesotho | 29th | Runner-up (1990, 2005, 2017) |
| Malawi | 20th | 4th Place (1986, 2000, 2006, 2011) |
| Mozambique | 29th | Champion (2020) |
| Namibia | 29th | Champion (2020) |
| South Africa | 29th | Champion (2000, 2004, 2006, 2008, 2009, 2013, 2017, 2018) |
| Zambia | 29th | Champion (1983, 1986, 1993, 1995, 1997, 1999, 2003, 2010, 2011, 2016, 2019, 2022) |

== Draw ==
The draw was held on 5 September 2024 at 11:00 CET (UTC+2) at Maputo.The 12 teams were drawn into three groups of four teams, with hosts Mozambique seeded in Group A (position A1), the defending champions Zambia seeded in Group B (position B1) and South Africa seeded in Group C (position C1). The remaining 9 teams were allocated to two pots based on the results of the previous tournament edition and were drawn to the remaining positions.

| Seeded | Pot 1 | Pot 2 |
|---|---|---|
| Mozambique (hosts); Zambia; South Africa | Angola; Malawi; Eswatini | Botswana; Comoros; Lesotho; Namibia; Madagascar; Zimbabwe |

== Group stage ==
The group stage were played in 3 groups as a round-robin, where the winners and the best runner-up advanced to the semi-finals. Because of Madagascar's withdrawal, points gained against the team finishing last in Groups A and C were not included in the calculation of the best runner-up.

=== Group A ===
| Pos | Team | Pld | W | D | L | GF | GA | GD | Pts | Qualification |
|---|---|---|---|---|---|---|---|---|---|---|
| 1 | Zimbabwe | 3 | 2 | 1 | 0 | 5 | 1 | +4 | 7 | Semi-finals |
| 2 | Botswana | 3 | 1 | 2 | 0 | 3 | 2 | +1 | 5 | |
| 3 | Eswatini | 3 | 1 | 1 | 1 | 5 | 7 | −2 | 4 | |
| 4 | Mozambique (H) | 3 | 0 | 0 | 3 | 5 | 8 | −3 | 0 | |

Source: COSAFA
(H) Hosts
26 September 2024
12:00

| Zimbabwe | 1–1 | Botswana |
|---|---|---|
| Moyo 30' | Report | Kaku 74' |

Estádio da Matola, Matola
26 September 2024
15:00

| Mozambique | 4–5 | Eswatini |
|---|---|---|
| Neves 20', 62'; Jose 59' (pen.); Seia 90+5' | Report | Dube 36'; Mdluli 38', 53'; Mazibuko 47'; Gwebu 77' |

Estádio da Matola, Matola

28 September 2024
12:00

| Eswatini | 0–3 | Zimbabwe |
|---|---|---|
| | Report | Cherera 26'; Muzenda 50' (pen.); Ndhlovu 86' |

Estádio da Matola Annex, Matola
28 September 2024
15:00

| Mozambique | 1–2 | Botswana |
|---|---|---|
| Neves 42' | Report | Japane 68'; Ratshukudu 77' (pen.) |

Estádio da Matola Annex, Matola

30 September 2024
15:00

| Eswatini | 0–0 | Botswana |
|---|---|---|
| | Report |

Estádio da Matola Annex, Matola
30 September 2024
15:00

| Mozambique | 0–1 | Zimbabwe |
|---|---|---|
| | Report | Moyo 47' |

Estádio da Matola, Matola

=== Group B ===
| Pos | Team | Pld | W | D | L | GF | GA | GD | Pts | Qualification |
|---|---|---|---|---|---|---|---|---|---|---|
| 1 | Angola | 2 | 2 | 0 | 0 | 4 | 1 | +3 | 6 | Semi-finals |
| 2 | Zambia | 2 | 1 | 0 | 1 | 3 | 4 | −1 | 3 | Semi-finals |
| 3 | Namibia | 2 | 0 | 0 | 2 | 1 | 3 | −2 | 0 | |
| 4 | Madagascar | 0 | 0 | 0 | 0 | 0 | 0 | 0 | 0 | Withdrew |

Source: COSAFA

Madagascar was also drawn into this group but withdrew before playing.

27 September 2024
15:00

| Zambia | 1–3 | Angola |
|---|---|---|
| Mwale 72' | Report | Haidara 28'; Pedro 31'; Chanda 90+3' (o.g.) |

Estádio da Matola, Matola

29 September 2024
15:00

| Angola | 1–0 | Namibia |
|---|---|---|
| Quissequel 89' | Report |

Estádio da Matola Annex, Matola

1 October 2024
12:00

| Zambia | 2–1 | Namibia |
|---|---|---|
| Mwanza 37'; Simukonda 62' | Report | Goagoseb 65' |

Estádio da Matola, Matola

=== Group C ===
| Pos | Team | Pld | W | D | L | GF | GA | GD | Pts | Qualification |
|---|---|---|---|---|---|---|---|---|---|---|
| 1 | South Africa | 3 | 3 | 0 | 0 | 13 | 0 | +13 | 9 | Semi-finals |
| 2 | Comoros | 3 | 1 | 0 | 2 | 2 | 4 | −2 | 3 | |
| 3 | Malawi | 3 | 1 | 0 | 2 | 4 | 9 | −5 | 3 | |
| 4 | Lesotho | 3 | 1 | 0 | 2 | 3 | 9 | −6 | 3 | |

Source: COSAFA
27 September 2024
12:00

| Comoros | 1–0 | Lesotho |
|---|---|---|
| Bacar 81' | Report |

Estádio da Matola Annex, Matola
27 September 2024
15:00

| South Africa | 5–0 | Malawi |
|---|---|---|
| April 36', 45'; Ah Shene 49'; Lethlaku 68'; Mbokazi 74' | Report |

Estádio da Matola Annex, Matola

29 September 2024
12:00

| Malawi | 2–1 | Comoros |
|---|---|---|
| Kaduya 11', 79' | Report | Ahamada 27' |

Estádio da Matola, Matola
29 September 2024
15:00

| South Africa | 6–0 | Lesotho |
|---|---|---|
| Ah Shene 17'; Campbell 25', 75'; Mofoko 42' (o.g.); Lethlaku 50'; Timba 56' | Report |

Estádio da Matola, Matola

1 October 2024
15:00

| Malawi | 2–3 | Lesotho |
|---|---|---|
| Masinja 64'; Mhango 85' (pen.) | Report | Maile 5' (pen.), 58'; Nthaka 43' |

Estádio da Matola Annex, Matola
1 October 2024
15:00

| Comoros | 0–2 | South Africa |
|---|---|---|
| | Report | Mabena 46'; Kgosana 83' |

Estádio da Matola, Matola

=== Ranking of second-placed teams ===
| Pos | Grp | Team | Pld | W | D | L | GF | GA | GD | Pts | Qualification |
|---|---|---|---|---|---|---|---|---|---|---|---|
| 1 | B | Zambia | 2 | 1 | 0 | 1 | 3 | 4 | −1 | 3 | Semi-finals |
| 2 | A | Botswana | 2 | 0 | 2 | 0 | 1 | 1 | 0 | 2 | |
| 3 | C | Comoros | 2 | 0 | 0 | 2 | 1 | 4 | −3 | 0 | |

Source: COSAFA
Rules for classification: Group tiebreakers

== Knockout stage ==
=== Bracket ===
Semi-finals
3 October - Matola
Angola | 0
South Africa | 1
3 October - Matola
Zimbabwe | 2 (5)
Zambia (p) | 2 (6)

Final
5 October - Matola
South Africa | 2
Zambia | 0

=== Semi-finals ===
3 October 2024
12:00

| Angola | 0–1 | South Africa |
|---|---|---|
| | | Ah Shene 25' |

Estádio da Matola, Matola

3 October 2024
15:00

| Zimbabwe | 2–2 | Zambia |
|---|---|---|
| Ndhlovu 62', 75' | | Mwale 25'; Simukonda 25' |
Penalties
| | 5–6 |

Estádio da Matola, Matola

=== Final ===
5 October 2024
14:00

| South Africa | 2–0 | Zambia |
|---|---|---|
| Campbell 5'; Ah Shene 45' |

Estádio da Matola, Matola

== Goalscorers ==
There were 55 goals scored in 18 matches, for an average of 3.06 goals per match.

4 goals

- (South Africa) Jody Ah Shene

3 goals

- (Mozambique) Kelvio Neves
- (South Africa) Shandre Campbell
- (Zimbabwe) Prince Ndhlovu

2 goals

- (Eswatini) Alakhe Mdluli
- (Lesotho) Paseka Maile
- (Malawi) Adiel Kaduya
- (South Africa) Shakeel April
- (South Africa) Kutlwana Lethlaku
- (Zambia) Mumba Mwale
- (Zambia) David Simukonda
- (Zimbabwe) Enock Moyo

1 goal

- (Angola) Amado Haidara
- (Angola) Simão Pedro
- (Angola) Filipe Quissequel
- (Botswana) Gaone Japane
- (Botswana) Losika Ratshukudu
- (Botswana) Philip Kaku
- (Comoros) Falahidine Ahamada
- (Comoros) Malaik Bacar
- (Eswatini) Malwande Gwebu
- (Eswatini) Njongo Mazibuko
- (Eswatini) Phiwayinkhosi Dube
- (Lesotho) Chewane Ntakha
- (Mozambique) Fernando Jose
- (Mozambique) Yuran Seia
- (Malawi) Mwisho Mhango
- (Malawi) Hermas Masinja
- (Namibia) Engilio Goagoseb
- (South Africa) Ofentse Kgosana
- (South Africa) Siyabonga Mabena
- (South Africa) Mbekezeli Mbokazi
- (South Africa) Sifiso Timba
- (Zimbabwe) Tanaka Cherera
- (Zimbabwe) Nisbet Muzenda
- (Zambia) Emmanuel Mwanza

1 own goal

- (Lesotho) Leluma Mofoko (Against South Africa)
- (Zambia) Fostino Chanda (Against Angola)

== See also ==
- 2024 COSAFA Under-17 Championship
