= Prince Ndlovu =

Zimbabwean footballer (born 2006)

Personal information
- Full name: Prince Dinisa Ndlovu
- Date of birth: 19 January 2006 (age 20)
- Place of birth: Bulawayo, Zimbabwe
- Height: 1.67 m (5 ft 6 in)
- Position: Midfielder

Team information
- Current team: Highlanders

Youth career
- Bosso90

Senior career*
Years	Team	Apps	(Gls)
2021–2022	Bosso90	19	(4)
2022–	Highlanders		

International career^{‡}
2025–	Zimbabwe	3	(0)
- * Club domestic league appearances and goals as of 18:08, 22 October 2023 (UTC) ‡ National team caps and goals as of 24 June 2025

Prince Dinisa Ndlovu (born 19 January 2006) is a Zimbabwean professional footballer who plays as a midfielder for Highlanders.

== Club career ==
At the age of sixteen years and 170 days, Ndlovu became the youngest player to be promoted to Zimbabwe Premier Soccer League (ZPSL) side Highlanders's first team, having previously played for their development team, Bosso90, scoring four times in nineteen appearances in the Zimbabwean regional league. He made his debut on 10 July 2022, coming on as a second-half substitute in a 3–0 win against Manica Diamonds. Highlanders is the club where his namesake (but not relation), Peter Ndlovu also made his debut at the age of sixteen, eight days older than Prince, and Ndlovu stated in a post-match interview following a 3–2 win against Yadah Stars: "I want to do more and achieve more [than Peter Ndlovu].", also stating that it was a "dream come true" to make his debut.

In February 2023, he was invited to trial with Croatian First Football League side Vukovar 1991, and travelled to South Africa in order to process his visa. However, this visa application was denied, and he returned to Zimbabwe. The following month, he spent a week on trial with South African side Orlando Pirates, his second trial with the side, as he had spent time with them in January as well. He went on trial again in April, this time with Austrian Bundesliga side Sturm Graz. However, after just three weeks of a ten-week trial, he returned to Zimbabwe, with Sturm Graz reportedly telling Ndlovu to gain more weight and muscle, with a view to take him back on trial again in July 2023.

== Career statistics ==
=== International ===
As of matches played 23 June 2025

National team	Year	Apps	Goals
Zimbabwe	2025	3	0
Total		3	0
