= 2013 COSAFA U-20 Cup =

2013 COSAFA Under-20 Youth Championship

Tournament details
- Host country: Lesotho
- Dates: 3–14 December
- Teams: 9
- Venue: 2 (in 2 host cities)

Final positions
- Champions: South Africa
- Runners-up: Kenya
- Third place: Angola
- Fourth place: Zimbabwe

Tournament statistics
- Matches played: 24
- Goals scored: 67 (2.79 per match)
- Top scorer: (Angola) Manuel Afonso (6 goals)

The 2013 COSAFA U-20 Cup was the 22nd edition of the COSAFA U-20 Challenge Cup, an international youth competition open to national associations of the COSAFA region. It was the first time since 2011 that the competition took place, as the 2012 event was cancelled while COSAFA concentrated their effort into organising a football competition as part of the Zone Six Games.

Lesotho was the host nation of the competition. It took place between 3 and 14 December. The host cities were Maseru and Mafeteng.

The competition was open to players born on or after 1 January 1994.

== Participants ==
The following nations participated:

- Angola
- Botswana
- Comoros
- Kenya
- Lesotho (hosts)
- Madagascar
- Mauritius
- Mozambique
- Namibia
- Seychelles
- South Africa
- Swaziland
- Zambia
- Zimbabwe

== Format ==
There were four groups where each group was decided on a round-robin base. All four group winners advanced to the semi-final stage.

The draw for the first round group stages took place in Maseru October 11.

== Group stage ==
The draw took place on 12 October 2013.

=== Group A ===
| Team | Pld | W | D | L | GF | GA | GD | Pts |
|---|---|---|---|---|---|---|---|---|
| Kenya | 3 | 2 | 1 | 0 | 8 | 2 | +6 | 7 |
| Lesotho | 3 | 1 | 2 | 0 | 6 | 3 | +3 | 5 |
| Comoros | 3 | 0 | 2 | 1 | 3 | 5 | −2 | 2 |
| Mauritius | 3 | 0 | 1 | 2 | 0 | 7 | −7 | 1 |

3 December 2013
15:00

| Kenya | 4-0 | Mauritius |
|---|---|---|
| Nairuka John 26'; Collins Shivaki 30'; Geoffrey Shiveka 39'; Enock Agwanda 84' |

Setsoto Stadium, Maseru
Referee: Makhobalo Philip (Lesotho)
3 December 2013
20:00

| Lesotho | 2-2 | Comoros |
|---|---|---|
| Moremoholo 72'; Thabantso 86' | | Alhadhur 51'; Tekane 74' (o.g.) |

Setsoto Stadium, Maseru
Referee: Musundire Nomore (Zimbabwe)
6 December 2013
14:00

| Lesotho | 1-1 | Kenya |
|---|---|---|
| Khutlan 60' | | Wanyonyi 26' |

Bantu Stadium, Mafeteng
Referee: Mositwane Tirelo (Botswana)
6 December 2013
16:30

| Comoros | 0-0 | Mauritius |

Bantu Stadium, Mafeteng
9 December 2013
17:00

| Mauritius | 0-3 | Lesotho |
|---|---|---|
| | | Khutlan 12'; Lekhooa 67'; Morapeli 90' |

Bantu Stadium, Mafeteng
Referee: Musundire Nomore (Zimbabwe)
9 December 2013
17:00

| Comoros | 1-3 | Kenya |
|---|---|---|
| Faidine 35' | | Wanyonyi 10'; Agwanda 40'; Otieno 76' |

Setsoto Stadium, Maseru
Referee: Tirelo Mositwane (Botswana)

=== Group B ===
| Team | Pld | W | D | L | GF | GA | GD | Pts |
|---|---|---|---|---|---|---|---|---|
| Angola | 3 | 2 | 1 | 0 | 10 | 4 | +6 | 7 |
| Mozambique | 3 | 1 | 1 | 1 | 8 | 4 | +4 | 4 |
| Madagascar | 2 | 0 | 0 | 2 | 1 | 11 | −10 | 0 |

4 December 2013
19:00

| Angola | 5-1 | Madagascar |
|---|---|---|
| Afonso 16' 45'; J. de Oliveria 20' 25' 44' | | Andreas +90' |

Setsoto Stadium, Maseru
Referee: Heeralall Ahmad (Mauritius)
6 December 2013
11:00

| Mozambique | 6-0 | Madagascar |
|---|---|---|
| D. Matimbe 35'; Clésio 45' (pen.) 62' 83'; Luís Miquissone 79'; N. Norberto 80' |

Bantu Stadium, Mafeteng
Referee: Magagula Wandile (Swaziland)
7 December 2013
19:00

| Angola | 3-1 | Mozambique |
|---|---|---|
| Afonso 2' 75'; J. de Oliveira 84' | | Luís Miquissone 10' |

Setsoto Stadium, Maseru
Referee: Phutheo Omphile (Botswana)

=== Group C ===
| Team | Pld | W | D | L | GF | GA | GD | Pts |
|---|---|---|---|---|---|---|---|---|
| South Africa | 3 | 2 | 1 | 0 | 5 | 0 | +5 | 7 |
| Namibia | 3 | 1 | 2 | 0 | 3 | 2 | +1 | 5 |
| Zambia | 3 | 1 | 1 | 1 | 5 | 2 | +3 | 4 |
| Seychelles | 3 | 0 | 0 | 3 | 1 | 10 | −9 | 0 |

4 December 2013
14:00

| South Africa | 4-0 | Seychelles |
|---|---|---|
| Ngubo 13' 48'; Magqwaka 27'; Ntuli 88' |

Bantu Stadium, Mafeteng
Referee: Mositwane Tirelo (Botswana)
4 December 2013
16:30

| Zambia | 1-1 | Namibia |
|---|---|---|
| Daka 57' | | Uiseb 8' |

Bantu Stadium, Mafeteng
Referee: Mositwane Tirelo (Botswana)
7 December 2013
16:30

| Namibia | 2-1 | Seychelles |
|---|---|---|
| Brandon Goagoseb 87'; Ambrosius Amseb 89' | | Dieter Constance 30' |

Bantu Stadium, Mafeteng
Referee: Heeralall Ahmad (Mauritius)
7 December 2013
17:00

| Zambia | 0-1 | South Africa |
|---|---|---|
| | | Nhlankanipho Ntuli 58' |

Setsoto Stadium, Maseru
Referee: Musundire Nomore (Zimbabwe)
10 December 2013
16:00

| Seychelles | 0-4 | Zambia |
|---|---|---|
| | | Spencer Sautu 52'; Danny Madelene 61' (o.g.); Ackim Mumba 67'; Langson Mbewe 85' |

Bantu Stadium, Mafeteng
Referee: Magagula Wandile (Swaziland)
10 December 2013
16:00

| Namibia | 0-0 | South Africa |

Setsoto Stadium, Maseru
Referee: Tirelo Mositwane (Botswana)

=== Group D ===
| Team | Pld | W | D | L | GF | GA | GD | Pts |
|---|---|---|---|---|---|---|---|---|
| Zimbabwe | 3 | 2 | 1 | 0 | 6 | 2 | +4 | 7 |
| Botswana | 3 | 1 | 1 | 1 | 4 | 5 | −1 | 4 |
| Swaziland | 2 | 0 | 0 | 2 | 1 | 4 | −3 | 0 |

3 December 2013
12:30

| Botswana | 2-0 | Swaziland |
|---|---|---|
| U. Mbaiwa 21'; Ramatlapeng 90' |

Setsoto Stadium, Maseru
Referee: Rakotojaona Andofetra (Madagascar)
4 December 2013
17:00

| Zimbabwe | 2-1 | Swaziland |
|---|---|---|
| W. Musona 10'; T. Radebe 90 +11' | | Nkambule ?' |

Setsoto Stadium, Maseru
Referee: Ndzandzeka Thando (South Africa)
7 December 2013
14:00

| Botswana | 0-3 | Zimbabwe |
|---|---|---|
| | | C. Rusere 32'; Liberty Chakoroma 56'; Walter Musona 66' |

Bantu Stadium, Mafeteng
Referee: Makhobalo Phillip (Lesotho)

=== Combined group games ===
9 December 2013
14:00

| Angola | 2-2 | Botswana |
|---|---|---|
| Afonso 19'; Baptista 73' | | Ramatlapeng 40'; Mbaiwa 50' (pen.) |

Bantu Stadium, Mafeteng
Referee: Ndzandzeka Thando (South Africa)
9 December 2013
14:00

| Zimbabwe | 1-1 | Mozambique |
|---|---|---|
| T. Kadewere 10' | | Baúque 67' |

Setsoto Stadium, Maseru
Referee: Makhobalo Phillip (Lesotho)

== Top scorers ==
6 goals

- (Angola) Manuel Afonso (Ary Papel)

4 goals

- (Angola) João de Oliveira
- (Mozambique) Clesio Baque

2 goals

- (Botswana) Thatayaone Ramatlapeng
- (Botswana) Unobatsha Mbaiwa
- (South Africa) Siyanda Ngubo
- (South Africa) Nhlakanipho Ntuli
- (Zimbabwe) Walter Musona

1 goal

- (Angola) Mavambu Baptista
- (Comoros) Athouman Alhadhur
- (Kenya) Enock Agwanda
- (Kenya) John Nairuka
- (Kenya) Collins Shivaki
- (Kenya) Geoffrey Shiveka
- (Kenya) Timonah Wanyonyi
- (Lesotho) Tumelo Khutlang
- (Lesotho) Mafa Moremoholo
- (Lesotho) Thabo Ntso
- (Madagascar) Angelo Andreas
- (Mozambique) Tafadzwa Kutinyu
- (Mozambique) Dercio Matimbe
- (Mozambique) Luís Miquissone
- (Namibia) Ambrosias Amseb
- (Namibia) Brandon Goagoseb
- (Namibia) Terdius Uiseb
- (Seychelles) Dieter Constance
- (South Africa) Ayabulela Magqwaka
- (Eswatini) Mlamuli Nkambule
- (Zambia) Patson Daka
- (Zimbabwe) Liberty Chakoroma
- (Zimbabwe) Norberto Norberto
- (Zimbabwe) Carlos Rusere
- (Zimbabwe) Tinotenda Kadewere

1 own goal

- (Lesotho) Lepolesa Tekane (playing against Comoros)

== Knockout stage ==
=== Semi finals ===
12 December 2013
18:00

| Kenya | 2-0 | Angola |
|---|---|---|
| E. Agwanda 20' (pen.) N. John 54' |

Setsoto Stadium, Maseru
Referee: Heeralall Ahmad (Mauritius)
12 December 2013
18:00

| South Africa | 0-0 | Zimbabwe |
Penalties
| Ntuli (penalty missed); Magqwaka (penalty scored); Leepile (penalty scored); Maraisane (penalty scored); Luthuli (penalty scored) | 4–2 | (penalty missed) Pfumbidzai; (penalty missed) Genti; (penalty scored) Chakaroma; (penalty scored) Diro; (penalty missed) W. Musona |

Setsoto Stadium, Maseru
Referee: Andofetra Rakotojoana (Madagascar)

=== Third place playoff ===
14 December 2013
14:00

| Zimbabwe | 0-2 | Angola |
|---|---|---|
| | | Afonso 83'; Joao Capemba 90+3' |

Setsoto Stadium, Maseru
Referee: Thando Ndzandzeka (South Africa)

=== Final ===
14 December 2013
17:00

| Kenya | 0-2 | South Africa |
|---|---|---|
| | | Ayabulela Mgqwaka 33' Siyanda Ngubo'69 |

Setsoto Stadium, Maseru
Referee: Mositwane Tirelo (Botswana)

== Winners ==
2013 COSAFA Under-20 Youth Championship

South Africa
6th title
