= Shandre Campbell =

South African sqoccer player

Personal information
- Full name: Shandre Miguel Campbell
- Date of birth: 15 July 2005 (age 21)
- Place of birth: Boksburg, South Africa
- Height: 1.78 m (5 ft 10 in)
- Position: Winger

Team information
- Current team: Kortrijk
- Number: 11

Youth career
- 2022–2023: SuperSport United

Senior career*
Years	Team	Apps	(Gls)
2023–2024	SuperSport United	30	(5)
2024–2026	Club NXT	25	(11)
2025–2026	Club Brugge	11	(1)
2026–	Kortrijk	2	(1)

International career^{‡}
2024–2025	South Africa U20	5	(3)
2026–	South Africa	1	(0)
- * Club domestic league appearances and goals as of 15 August 2026 ‡ National team caps and goals as of 4 October 2026

Shandre Miguel Campbell (born 15 July 2005) is a South African soccer player who plays as a left winger for Belgian Pro League club Kortrijk and the South Africa national team.

== Club career ==
=== SuperSport ===
He made his South African Premier Division debut for SuperSport United in August 2023 against Richards Bay. He scored his first two goals in a victory over Orlando Pirates. As the season progressed, Campbell performed well in both the league, the 2023–24 Nedbank Cup and the 2023–24 CAF Confederation Cup. He was hailed as a rising star of the season, and pundits discussed a move to one of South Africa's major clubs or to Europe.

=== Club NXT ===
In July 2024 he finalized a move to Club NXT, the youth academy of Club Brugge. In August 2024, Campbell scored his first goal for Club NXT on his debut.

=== Kortrijk ===
On 20 July 2026, Campbell signed a four-year contract with Kortrijk.

== International career ==
Campbell competed with the South Africa U-20 team at the 2024 COSAFA U-20 Cup and helped the team qualify for the 2025 U-20 Africa Cup of Nations. He was the voted best player at the tournament.

On 1 December 2025, Campbell was called up to the South Africa squad for the 2025 Africa Cup of Nations, but he did not feature in any match.

On 4 October 2026, Campbell made his senior international debut in a friendly against Egypt.

== Career statistics ==
=== Club ===
As of match played 6 April 2026

Appearances and goals by club, season and competition
Club	Season	League			Cup		Continental		Other		Total	
Club	Season	Division	Apps	Goals	Apps	Goals	Apps	Goals	Apps	Goals	Apps	Goals
SuperSport United	2023–24	South African Premiership	20	2	4	3	6 (Note: Appearances in CAF Confederation Cup)	0	—		30	5
Club NXT	2024–25	Challenger Pro League	19	9	—		—		—		19	9
Club Brugge	2024–25	Belgian Pro League	2	0	0	0	0	0	—		2	0
Club Brugge	2025–26	Belgian Pro League	11	1	1	1	3 (Note: Appearances in UEFA Champions League)	0	—		15	2
Club Brugge	Total		13	1	1	1	3	0	—		17	2
Career total			52	12	5	4	9	0	0	0	66	16

== Honours ==
South Africa U-20

- COSAFA U-20 Challenge Cup: 2024

Club Brugge

- Belgian Cup
- Belgian Super Cup
