= Matola Stadium =

Stadium in Maputo, Mozambique

- Interactive map of Matola Stadium
- Address: Maputo; Mozambique
- Coordinates: 25.91666°S 32.52625°E
- Capacity: 3,000
- Type: Multi-purpose
- Surface: grass

Matola Stadium is a multi-purpose stadium in Maputo, Mozambique. It is currently used mostly for football matches and is the home stadium of Atlético Muçulmano da Matola. The stadium holds 3,000 people.
