= 2017 U-20 Africa Cup of Nations squads =

Football tournament squads

The squads for the 2017 Africa U-20 Cup of Nations were announced on 24 February 2017.

Players marked in bold have been capped at full International level.

== Cameroon ==
Head coach: Cyprien Asshu Bessong

| No. | Pos. | Player | Date of birth (age) | Club |
|---|---|---|---|---|
| 1 | GK | Junior Dande | 22 February 1998 (aged 19) | (Cameroonian Football Federation) APEJES Academy |
| 2 | DF | **Duplexe Tchamba** | 10 July 1998 (aged 18) | (Cameroonian Football Federation) TAD Sport FC |
| 3 | DF | Karl Junior Ndedi Kegne | 25 December 1999 (aged 17) | (Cameroonian Football Federation) New Star de Douala |
| 4 | DF | Serge Ngono | 4 April 1998 (aged 18) | (Cameroonian Football Federation) Eding Sport FC |
| 5 | DF | **Nouhou Tolo** | 23 June 1997 (aged 19) | (United States Soccer Federation) Seattle Sounders FC |
| 6 | MF | **Samuel Gouet** | 14 December 1997 (aged 19) | (Cameroonian Football Federation) APEJES Academy |
| 7 | FW | Kalvin Ketu Jih | 6 June 1997 (aged 19) | (Royal Spanish Football Federation) Alcobendas CF |
| 8 | MF | Hervé Bodiong | 17 June 1997 (aged 19) | (Cyprus Football Association) Akritas Chlorakas |
| 9 | FW | Felix Chenkam | 28 December 1998 (aged 18) | (United States Soccer Federation) Seattle Sounders FC 2 |
| 10 | MF | Victor Mpindi | 27 February 1997 (aged 19) | (Cameroonian Football Federation) AS Fortuna de Yaounde |
| 11 | FW | Eric Ayuk | 17 February 1997 (aged 20) | (United States Soccer Federation) Philadelphia Union |
| 12 | DF | Fabrice Gael Ngah | 16 October 1997 (aged 19) | (Cameroonian Football Federation) UMS de Loum |
| 13 | DF | Rodrigue Ele | 2 March 1998 (aged 18) | (Cameroonian Football Federation) AS Fortuna de Yaounde |
| 14 | MF | Joss Didiba | 7 November 1997 (aged 19) | (Italian Football Federation) Perugia |
| 15 | DF | **Olivier Mbaizo** | 15 August 1997 (aged 19) | (Cameroonian Football Federation) Union Sportive de Douala |
| 16 | GK | Amido Yindui | 1 October 1999 (aged 17) | (Cameroonian Football Federation) Best Stars de Limbe |
| 17 | MF | Felix Djoubairou | 10 March 1998 (aged 18) | (Cameroonian Football Federation) Coton Sport FC de Garoua |
| 18 | FW | Beligine Ngeh | 10 October 1999 (aged 17) | (Cameroonian Football Federation) Eding Sport FC |
| 19 | FW | Preston Tabortetaka Obiarrah | 10 June 1998 (aged 18) | (Cameroonian Football Federation) New Star de Douala |
| 20 | MF | **Kévin Soni** | 17 April 1998 (aged 18) | (French Football Federation) Pau FC (on loan from Bordeaux) |
| 21 | GK | **Simon Omossola** | 5 May 1998 (aged 18) | (Cameroonian Football Federation) Coton Sport FC de Garoua |

== Egypt ==
Head coach: Moatamed Gamal Abdelaziz

| No. | Pos. | Player | Date of birth (age) | Club |
|---|---|---|---|---|
| 1 | GK | Omar Wael Abdelsamie Abdelhamed | 31 July 1997 (aged 19) | (Egyptian Football Association) El Sharkia SC |
| 2 | DF | Ahmed Hany | 19 May 1997 (aged 19) | (Egyptian Football Association) Ismaily SC |
| 3 | DF | Amr Ismail | 12 February 1997 (aged 20) | (Egyptian Football Association) Tanta SC |
| 4 | DF | **Osama Galal** | 17 September 1997 (aged 19) | (Egyptian Football Association) Petrojet FC |
| 5 | DF | Mohamed Abdelsalam | 1 October 1997 (aged 19) | (Egyptian Football Association) Petrojet FC |
| 6 | DF | Mahmoud Marei | 24 April 1998 (aged 18) | (Egyptian Football Association) Wadi Degla |
| 7 | FW | Karim Walid | 8 August 1997 (aged 19) | (Egyptian Football Association) Al Ahly |
| 8 | MF | Nasser Maher | 8 February 1997 (aged 20) | (Egyptian Football Association) Petrojet FC |
| 9 | MF | **Taher Mohamed** | 7 March 1997 (aged 19) | (French Football Federation) Le Havre AC |
| 10 | MF | Khalia Haggagy | 26 April 1998 (aged 18) | (Swiss Football Association) FC Zurich |
| 11 | FW | **Mostafa Mohamed** | 28 November 1997 (aged 19) | (Egyptian Football Association) El Dakhleya SC |
| 12 | MF | **Akram Tawfik** | 8 November 1997 (aged 19) | (Egyptian Football Association) Al Ahly |
| 13 | DF | Mostafa Faramawy Salaheldin | 10 January 1997 (aged 20) | (Egyptian Football Association) Tanta SC |
| 14 | MF | Ahmed Hamdy | 10 February 1998 (aged 19) | (Egyptian Football Association) Al Ahly |
| 15 | FW | **Omar Marmoush** | 7 February 1999 (aged 18) | (Egyptian Football Association) Wadi Degla |
| 16 | GK | Mostafa Mahmoud Mohamed | 7 July 1997 (aged 19) | (Egyptian Football Association) Tala'ea El-Gaish SC |
| 17 | MF | Ahmed Ramadan | 23 March 1997 (aged 19) | (Egyptian Football Association) Al Ahly |
| 18 | MF | Mahmoud Samy | 20 July 1997 (aged 19) | (Egyptian Football Association) El Dakhleya SC |
| 19 | MF | Ahmed Mostafa Elsayed Taher | 21 October 1997 (aged 19) | (Egyptian Football Association) Petrojet FC |
| 20 | DF | **Ahmed Aboul-Fotouh** | 22 March 1998 (aged 18) | (Egyptian Football Association) Zamalek SC |
| 21 | GK | Mohamed Essam Mostafa Mohamed | 1 August 1997 (aged 19) | (Egyptian Football Association) Al Ahly |

== Guinea ==
Head coach:

| No. | Pos. | Player | Date of birth (age) | Club |
|---|---|---|---|---|
| 1 | GK | **Sékouba Camara** | 22 January 1997 (aged 20) | (Guinean Football Federation) Atlético Coleah |
| 2 | DF | Salif Sylla | 5 December 1998 (aged 18) | (Guinean Football Federation) AS Kaloum |
| 3 | DF | Mamadouba Diaby | 16 February 1997 (aged 20) | (Guinean Football Federation) AS Kaloum |
| 4 | DF | Mohamed Lamine Sylla | 2 February 1997 (aged 20) | (Guinean Football Federation) Hafia FC |
| 5 | DF | Mohamed Camara | 1 November 1998 (aged 18) | (Guinean Football Federation) Fello Star |
| 6 | DF | Mohamed Didé Fofana | 8 April 1998 (aged 18) | (Guinean Football Federation) Hafia FC |
| 7 | MF | **Daouda Camara** | 20 August 1997 (aged 19) | (Guinean Football Federation) Horoya AC |
| 8 | MF | Ibrahima Sory Soumah | 1 January 1998 (aged 19) | (Guinean Football Federation) Fello Star |
| 9 | FW | **Momo Yansané** | 29 July 1997 (aged 19) | (Guinean Football Federation) Hafia FC |
| 10 | MF | **Morlaye Sylla** | 27 July 1998 (aged 18) | (Portuguese Football Federation) FC Arouca |
| 11 | FW | Ibrahima Sylla | 14 May 1997 (aged 19) | (Guinean Football Federation) Hafia FC |
| 12 | MF | Mohamed Coumbassa | 5 June 1999 (aged 17) | (Guinean Football Federation) Wakriya AC |
| 13 | DF | **Mohamed Ali Camara** | 28 August 1997 (aged 19) | (Guinean Football Federation) Hafia FC |
| 14 | FW | Yamodou Touré | 5 August 1998 (aged 18) | (Guinean Football Federation) Horoya AC |
| 15 | MF | Mamadou Kane | 22 January 1997 (aged 20) | (Guinean Football Federation) AS Kaloum |
| 16 | GK | Moussa Camara | 27 November 1998 (aged 18) | (Guinean Football Federation) Horoya AC |
| 17 | FW | Barry Mamady | 22 November 1997 (aged 19) | (Guinean Football Federation) Soumba FC |
| 18 | MF | Alseny Soumah | 16 May 1998 (aged 18) | (Portuguese Football Federation) FC Arouca |
| 19 | MF | Naby Bangoura | 29 March 1998 (aged 18) | (Portuguese Football Federation) FC Vizela |
| 20 | FW | Facinet Soumah | 18 March 1998 (aged 18) | (Guinean Football Federation) Fello Star |
| 21 | GK | Fodé David Kaba | 15 August 1998 (aged 18) | (Guinean Football Federation) Hafia FC |

== Mali ==
Head coach: Baye Ba

| No. | Pos. | Player | Date of birth (age) | Club |
|---|---|---|---|---|
| 1 | GK | Samuel Diarra | 11 August 1998 (aged 18) | (Royal Spanish Football Federation) Cultural y Deportiva Leonesa |
| 2 | DF | **Abdoul Karim Danté** | 29 October 1998 (aged 18) | (Royal Belgian Football Association) RSC Anderlecht |
| 3 | DF | **Siaka Bagayoko** | 4 July 1998 (aged 18) | (Malian Football Federation) Djoliba AC |
| 4 | DF | Dramane Simpara | 5 May 1998 (aged 18) | (Malian Football Federation) CS Duguwolofila |
| 5 | DF | Mamadou Koné | 22 August 1997 (aged 19) | (Malian Football Federation) AS Onze Créateurs de Niaréla |
| 6 | MF | Ousmane Diakité | 25 July 2000 (aged 16) | (Austrian Football Association) FC Red Bull Salzburg |
| 7 | FW | Sidiki Maiga | 28 December 1998 (aged 18) | (Royal Spanish Football Federation) AD Alcorcón |
| 8 | MF | Moussa Diakité | 17 December 1998 (aged 18) | (Malian Football Federation) AS Korofina |
| 9 | MF | Amadou Diarra | 8 June 1999 (aged 17) | (Malian Football Federation) Lafia Club de Bamako |
| 10 | FW | Ibrahima Kone | 16 June 1999 (aged 17) | (Malian Football Federation) CO de Bamako |
| 11 | FW | Boubacar Traoré | 24 May 1998 (aged 18) | (Malian Football Federation) Jeanne d'Arc FC |
| 12 | FW | **Moussa Djenepo** | 15 June 1998 (aged 18) | (Royal Belgian Football Association) Standard de Liege |
| 13 | FW | **Ismaila Coulibaly** | 25 December 2000 (aged 16) | (Malian Football Federation) CS Duguwolofila |
| 14 | MF | Mohamed Sangare | 4 August 1998 (aged 18) | (Malian Football Federation) AS Real Bamako |
| 15 | DF | **Mamadou Fofana** | 21 January 1998 (aged 19) | (Turkish Football Federation) Alanyaspor |
| 16 | GK | Drissa Kouyate | 17 December 1998 (aged 18) | (Malian Football Federation) AS Real Bamako |
| 17 | DF | Babou Fofana | 10 April 1999 (aged 17) | (Malian Football Federation) Stade Malien |
| 18 | MF | **Amadou Haidara** | 31 January 1998 (aged 19) | (Austrian Football Association) FC Red Bull Salzburg |
| 19 | FW | Zoumana Simpara | 22 February 1998 (aged 19) | (Malian Football Federation) AS Bakaridjan |
| 20 | MF | **Sékou Koïta** | 28 November 1999 (aged 17) | (Austrian Football Association) FC Red Bull Salzburg |
| 21 | GK | Modibo Traore | 13 April 1999 (aged 17) | (Malian Football Federation) FC Diarra |

== Senegal ==
Head coach: Joseph Koto

| No. | Pos. | Player | Date of birth (age) | Club |
|---|---|---|---|---|
| 1 | GK | Mamadou Moustapha Seck | 5 March 1997 (aged 19) | (Senegalese Football Federation) Mbour Petite-Côte FC |
| 2 | DF | Waly Diouf | 5 May 1997 (aged 19) | (French Football Federation) Valenciennes FC |
| 3 | DF | Jean Jacques Idrissa Ndecky | 10 January 1997 (aged 20) | (Senegalese Football Federation) Casa Sports |
| 4 | DF | Souleymane Aw | 5 April 1999 (aged 17) | (Senegalese Football Federation) Excellence Foot de Dakar |
| 5 | MF | Ousseynou Diagne | 5 June 1999 (aged 17) | (Senegalese Football Federation) Académie Foot Darou Salam |
| 6 | DF | Mamadou Diarra | 20 December 1997 (aged 19) | (Turkish Football Federation) Boluspor |
| 7 | FW | Ibrahima Niane | 11 March 1999 (aged 17) | (Senegalese Football Federation) Génération Foot |
| 8 | DF | Moussa Ba | 1 January 1998 (aged 19) | (Senegalese Football Federation) Excellence Foot de Dakar |
| 9 | FW | Mouhamed Pouye | 26 December 1997 (aged 19) | (Senegalese Football Federation) Mbour Petite-Côte FC |
| 10 | FW | Aliou Badji | 10 October 1997 (aged 19) | (Swedish Football Association) Djurgårdens IF |
| 11 | FW | Ibrahima Ndiaye | 6 July 1998 (aged 18) | (Egyptian Football Association) Wadi Degla |
| 12 | FW | Pape Habib Guèye | 20 September 1999 (aged 17) | (Senegalese Football Federation) Académie Foot Darou Salam |
| 13 | DF | Alioune Badara Guèye | 20 August 1998 (aged 18) | (Senegalese Football Federation) ASC Niarry Tally |
| 14 | FW | Mor Nguer | 9 October 1997 (aged 19) | (Senegalese Football Federation) Gorée |
| 15 | DF | Momo Mbaye | 28 June 1998 (aged 18) | (Senegalese Football Federation) AS Dakar Sacré-Cœur |
| 16 | GK | Lamine Sarr | 18 June 1998 (aged 18) | (Senegalese Football Federation) AS Dakar Sacré-Cœur |
| 17 | MF | **Krépin Diatta** | 25 February 1999 (aged 18) | (Senegalese Football Federation) Oslo Football Academy in Senegal |
| 18 | MF | Soulèye Sarr | 29 July 1997 (aged 19) | (Senegalese Football Federation) Mbour Petite-Côte FC |
| 19 | MF | Cheikh Ahmadou Bamba Kane | 4 January 1997 (aged 20) | (Senegalese Football Federation) Diambars FC |
| 20 | FW | Dominique Édouard Miquilan | 17 May 1997 (aged 19) | (French Football Federation) SM Caen |
| 21 | GK | Idrissa Ndiaye | 14 March 1998 (aged 18) | (Senegalese Football Federation) Diambars FC |

== South Africa ==
Head coach: (South Africa) Thabo Senong

| No. | Pos. | Player | Date of birth (age) | Club |
|---|---|---|---|---|
| 1 | GK | Sanele Tshabalala | 12 May 1998 (aged 18) | (South African Football Association) Bidvest Wits |
| 2 | DF | Notha Nature Nature Ngcobo | 10 January 1999 (aged 18) | (South African Football Association) Mamelodi Sundowns |
| 3 | DF | Aghmat Ceres | 28 January 1997 (aged 20) | (South African Football Association) Ajax Cape Town |
| 4 | DF | **Katlego Mohamme** | 10 March 1998 (aged 18) | (South African Football Association) SuperSport United |
| 5 | DF | **Sandile Mthethwa** | 14 April 1997 (aged 19) | (South African Football Association) Orlando Pirates |
| 6 | MF | **Wiseman Meyiwa** | 27 December 1999 (aged 17) | (South African Football Association) Kaizer Chiefs |
| 7 | MF | **Grant Margeman** | 3 June 1998 (aged 18) | (South African Football Association) Ajax Cape Town |
| 8 | MF | Sibongakonke Mbatha | 1 January 1998 (aged 19) | (South African Football Association) Bidvest Wits |
| 9 | FW | Itumeleng Shopane | 16 June 1997 (aged 19) | (South African Football Association) Kaizer Chiefs |
| 10 | FW | **Luther Singh** | 5 August 1997 (aged 19) | (Portuguese Football Federation) Sporting Braga |
| 11 | MF | **Phakamani Mahlambi** | 12 September 1997 (aged 19) | (South African Football Association) Bidvest Wits |
| 12 | MF | **Sipho Mbule** | 22 March 1998 (aged 18) | (South African Football Association) SuperSport United |
| 13 | DF | **Thendo Mukumela** | 30 January 1998 (aged 19) | (South African Football Association) Mamelodi Sundowns |
| 14 | DF | **Siyabonga Ngezana** | 15 July 1997 (aged 19) | (South African Football Association) Kaizer Chiefs |
| 15 | DF | **Tercious Malepe** | 18 February 1997 (aged 20) | (South African Football Association) Orlando Pirates |
| 16 | GK | **Mondli Mpoto** | 24 July 1998 (aged 18) | (South African Football Association) SuperSport United |
| 17 | FW | Khanyiso Eric Mayo | 27 August 1998 (aged 18) | (South African Football Association) SuperSport United |
| 18 | MF | **Teboho Mokoena** | 24 January 1997 (aged 20) | (South African Football Association) SuperSport United |
| 19 | MF | Kobamelo Kodisang | 28 August 1999 (aged 17) | (South African Football Association) Platinum Stars |
| 20 | GK | Khulekani Kubheka | 7 January 1999 (aged 18) | (South African Football Association) Mamelodi Sundowns |
| 21 | FW | **Liam Jordan** | 30 July 1998 (aged 18) | (Portuguese Football Federation) Sporting CP |

== Sudan ==
Head coach: Mubark Suliman Mohamed Slaih

| No. | Pos. | Player | Date of birth (age) | Club |
|---|---|---|---|---|
| 1 | GK | **Ishag Adam** | 1 January 1999 (aged 18) | (Sudan Football Association) Osood Darfur |
| 2 | DF | Baghdad Hamad | 1 January 1998 (aged 19) | (Sudan Football Association) Al-Merrikh SC |
| 3 | FW | Eid Mugadam | 17 September 1999 (aged 17) | (Sudan Football Association) Al-Ahly Shendi |
| 4 | DF | Mohamed Habba | 5 August 2000 (aged 16) | (Sudan Football Association) Al Khartoum SC |
| 5 | DF | Mazin Mustafa | 24 August 1999 (aged 17) | (Sudan Football Association) Al-Hilal Club (Omdurman) |
| 6 | MF | **Ammar Taifour** | 12 April 1997 (aged 19) | Unattached |
| 7 | FW | Fathelaleem Kondees | 1 January 1999 (aged 18) | (Sudan Football Association) Al-Hilal ESC (Al-Fasher) |
| 8 | FW | Khaled Nassan | 2 May 1998 (aged 18) | (Sudan Football Association) Al-Merrikh SC |
| 9 | FW | **Walaa Eldin Yaqoub** | 1 January 2000 (aged 17) | (Sudan Football Association) Al-Hilal Club (Omdurman) |
| 10 | MF | Hassan Mutwakil | 1 January 1997 (aged 20) | (Sudan Football Association) Al-Ahly Shendi |
| 11 | DF | Ramadan Elfaki Kabo Suliman | 1 January 1998 (aged 19) | (Sudan Football Association) Al-Hilal Club (Omdurman) |
| 12 | MF | Mohamed Hamatto | 1 January 1998 (aged 19) | (Sudan Football Association) Wadi Elneel |
| 13 | MF | Musab Kurdman | 4 April 2000 (aged 16) | (Sudan Football Association) Al-Ahly Shendi |
| 14 | DF | Mazin Mohamed | 2 May 2000 (aged 16) | (Sudan Football Association) Ombada |
| 15 | GK | Abdalla Yagoub Adam | 3 January 2000 (aged 17) | (Sudan Football Association) Al Ameer Khartoum |
| 16 | GK | Mohamed Alnour Adam Saeed | 1 January 2000 (aged 17) | (Sudan Football Association) Al-Hilal Club (Omdurman) |
| 17 | FW | Mohamed Abbas Gumaa | 17 June 2000 (aged 16) | (Sudan Football Association) Ombada |
| 18 | MF | Moumen Esam | 23 November 2000 (aged 16) | (Sudan Football Association) Al-Hilal Club (Omdurman) |
| 19 | DF | Mohaid Waheed | 23 September 1999 (aged 17) | (Sudan Football Association) Al Ahli SC (Khartoum) |
| 20 | MF | **Mustafa Elfadni** | 24 October 1999 (aged 17) | (Sudan Football Association) Al-Hilal Club (Omdurman) |
| 21 | DF | Ibrahim Mohamed Sulieman Mohamed | 1 January 1999 (aged 18) | (Sudan Football Association) Al Ahli SC (Khartoum) |

== Zambia ==
Head coach: Bestone Chambeshi

| No. | Pos. | Player | Date of birth (age) | Club |
|---|---|---|---|---|
| 1 | GK | Mangani Banda | 13 July 1997 (aged 19) | (Football Association of Zambia) Zanaco |
| 2 | DF | **Moses Nyondo** | 5 July 1997 (aged 19) | (Football Association of Zambia) Nkana |
| 3 | DF | Prosper Chiluya | 2 April 1998 (aged 18) | (Football Association of Zambia) Kafue Celtic |
| 4 | DF | Benson Chali | 2 December 1997 (aged 19) | (Football Association of Zambia) Forrest Rangers |
| 5 | DF | Solomon Sakala | 28 April 1997 (aged 19) | (Football Association of Zambia) Kabwe Warriors |
| 6 | MF | Sydney Phiri | 12 June 1997 (aged 19) | (Football Association of Zambia) Gomes |
| 7 | MF | Chrispine Sakulanda | 27 June 1997 (aged 19) | (Football Association of Zambia) Mufulira Wanderers |
| 8 | MF | Harrison Musonda Chisala | 4 August 1997 (aged 19) | (Football Association of Zambia) Nkana |
| 9 | FW | **Conlyde Luchanga** | 11 March 1997 (aged 19) | (Football Association of Zambia) Lusaka Dynamos |
| 10 | FW | **Fashion Sakala** | 14 March 1997 (aged 19) | (Scottish Football Association) Rangers |
| 11 | MF | **Enock Mwepu** | 1 January 1998 (aged 19) | (The Football Association) Brighton |
| 12 | FW | **Emmanuel Banda** | 29 September 1997 (aged 19) | (Portuguese Football Federation) S.C. Esmoriz |
| 13 | DF | **Shemmy Mayembe** | 22 November 1997 (aged 19) | (Football Association of Zambia) ZESCO United |
| 14 | FW | **Edward Chilufya** | 17 September 1999 (aged 17) | (Football Association of Zambia) Mpande Youth Academy |
| 15 | DF | Edward Tembo | 26 March 1997 (aged 19) | (Football Association of Zambia) Gomes |
| 16 | GK | Samson Banda | 1 May 1997 (aged 19) | (Football Association of Zambia) ZESCO United |
| 17 | MF | Kenneth Kalunga | 18 January 1997 (aged 20) | (Danish Football Association) Ikast FS |
| 18 | GK | Jim James Phiri | 7 September 1998 (aged 18) | (Football Association of Zambia) Circuit City |
| 19 | MF | Mumba Mwape | 26 April 1998 (aged 18) | (Royal Spanish Football Federation) Getafe |
| 20 | FW | **Patson Daka** | 9 October 1998 (aged 18) | (Austrian Football Association) Liefering |
| 21 | MF | Boyd Siame Musonda | 12 May 1997 (aged 19) | (Football Association of Zambia) Zanaco |
