= 2016 COSAFA U-20 Cup =

2016 COSAFA Under-20 Youth Championship
Tournament details
- Host country: South Africa
- City: Rustenburg
- Dates: 7–16 December 2016
- Teams: 14 (from 1 association)
- Venues: 2 (in 1 host city)

Final positions
- Champions: Zambia
- Runners-up: South Africa
- Third place: DR Congo
- Fourth place: Angola

Tournament statistics
- Matches played: 24
- Goals scored: 63 (2.63 per match)
- Top scorer(s): (South Africa) Luther Singh (5 goals)

The 2016 COSAFA U-20 Cup will be the 23rd edition of the COSAFA U20 Cup, an international youth competition open to national associations of the COSAFA region.

In April 2016, it was announced that South Africa would be the host nation of the competition.

The competition is open to players born on or before 1 January 1997, ensuring that all participants are also eligible for the 2017 Africa U-20 Cup of Nations.

== Participants ==
The following teams are expected to participate:

- Angola
- Botswana
- Comoros
- DR Congo (invitee) (Note: Rwanda were originally invitees but withdrew and were replaced with Democratic Republic of the Congo on 2 November.)
- Lesotho
- Mozambique
- Mauritius
- Malawi
- South Africa
- Sudan (invitee) (Note: Namibia withdrew and were replaced with Sudan on 19 November.)
- Seychelles
- Swaziland
- Zambia
- Zimbabwe

The following teams rejected an invitation to compete:

- Madagascar

== Draw ==
The draw took place on 26 October 2016.

Seeded	Pot 1	Pot 2
South Africa (assigned to A1, as host); Angola (assigned to C1, as title holder); Zimbabwe; Mozambique	Lesotho; Namibia; Comoros; Botswana; Zambia	DR Congo; Malawi; Swaziland; Mauritius; Seychelles

== Venues ==
Rustenburg
Mogwase Stadium	2016 COSAFA U-20 Cup is located in North West (South African province)	Moruleng Stadium
25.266592°S 27.234335°E	2016 COSAFA U-20 Cup is located in North West (South African province)	25.156667°S 27.175556°E
Capacity: 3,500	2016 COSAFA U-20 Cup is located in North West (South African province)	Capacity: 20,000

== Group stage ==
=== Group A ===
Pos	Team	Pld	W	D	L	GF	GA	GD	Pts	Qualification
1	South Africa	3	3	0	0	10	0	+10	9	Advance to Semi-finals
2	Lesotho	3	2	0	1	3	3	0	6	
3	Swaziland	2	1	0	1	3	3	0	3	
4	Botswana	3	0	0	3	0	10	−10	0	

First match(es) will be played: unknown. Source:
7 December 2016
14:00

Swaziland	2–0	Botswana
Mthembu 34'; Matse 76'	Report

Moruleng Stadium
Referee: Stanley Hachiwa (Zambia)
7 December 2016
19:30

South Africa	8–0	Lesotho
Shopane 12'; Singh 17' (pen.); Meyiwa 35'; Ngcobo 50'; Ndwandwe 76'; Sibiya 77'; Mbatha 83'; Ceres 89'	Report

Moruleng Stadium
Referee: Nomore Musundire (Zimbabwe)
9 December 2016
14:00

South Africa	1–0	Swaziland
Ndwandwe 88'	Report

Moruleng Stadium
Referee: Jonas Shongedi (Namibia)
10 December 2016
17:30

Lesotho	1–0	Botswana
Botswane 80'	Report

Moruleng Stadium
Referee: Allister Barra (Seychelles)
12 December 2016
17:00

Swaziland	1–2	Lesotho
Gamedeze 5'	Report	Malane 42'; Kamela 48'

Mogwase Stadium
Referee: Stanley Hachiwa (Zambia)
12 December 2016
17:00

Botswana	0–1	South Africa
	Report	Mbatha 65'

Moruleng Stadium
Referee: Allister Barra (Seychelles)

=== Group B ===
Pos	Team	Pld	W	D	L	GF	GA	GD	Pts	Qualification
1	Zambia	2	2	0	0	8	1	+7	6	Advance to Semi-finals
2	Malawi	2	0	1	1	0	3	−3	1	
3	Zimbabwe	2	0	1	1	1	5	−4	1	

First match(es) will be played: unknown. Source:
7 December 2016
16:30

Zambia	5–1	Zimbabwe
Daka 41'; Chilufya 44'; Sakulanda 60'; Sakala 80'; Nyondo 90'	Report	Sibanda 87' (pen.)

Moruleng Stadium
Referee: Tirelo Mositwane (Botswana)
9 December 2016
17:00

Malawi	0–0	Zimbabwe
	Report

Moruleng Stadium
Referee: Tirelo Mositwane (Botswana)
11 December 2016
14:30

Zambia	3–0	Malawi
Sakulanda 25'; Daka 74'; Sakala 86'	Report

Moruleng Stadium
Referee: Ahmad Heeralall (Mauritius)

=== Group C ===
Pos	Team	Pld	W	D	L	GF	GA	GD	Pts	Qualification
1	Angola	3	2	1	0	6	1	+5	7	Advance to Semi-finals
2	Mauritius	3	1	2	0	4	2	+2	5	
3	Sudan	3	1	1	1	6	2	+4	4	
4	Seychelles	3	0	0	3	0	11	−11	0	

First match(es) will be played: unknown. Source:
8 December 2016
14:00

Seychelles	0–2	Mauritius
Louise (red card) 90'	Report	Ferre 21'; Dimanche 47'; Sarah (red card) 87'

Mogwase Stadium
Referee: Kulasande Qongqo (South Africa)
8 December 2016
17:00

Angola	1–0	Sudan
Chico Banza 37'	Report	Osman (yellow card) 82' (yellow-red card)

Mogwase Stadium
Referee: Ahmad Heeralall (Mauritius)
10 December 2016
11:00

Angola	4–0	Seychelles
Chico Banza 20' da Luz 33'; Vá 41'; Pedro Alves 90+4'	Report

Mogwase Stadium
Referee: Stanley Hachiwa (Zambia)
10 December 2016
14:30

Sudan	1–1	Mauritius
Hassan 37'	Report	Dimanche 85'

Mogwase Stadium
Referee: Nomore Musundire (Zimbabwe)
12 December 2016
14:00

Sudan	5–0	Seychelles
Walaa Eldin Yaqoub 17', 74', 90'; Osman 23'; Taifour 77'	Report

Mogwase Stadium
Referee: Lebalang Mokete (Lesotho)
12 December 2016
14:00

Mauritius	1–1	Angola
Vincent 51'	Report	Vá 33'; Morais (red card) 80'

Moruleng Stadium
Referee: Jonas Shongedi (Namibia)

=== Group D ===
Pos	Team	Pld	W	D	L	GF	GA	GD	Pts	Qualification
1	DR Congo	2	1	1	0	2	0	+2	4	Advance to Semi-finals
2	Mozambique	2	0	2	0	2	2	0	2	
3	Comoros	2	0	1	1	2	4	−2	1	

First match(es) will be played: unknown. Source:
8 December 2016
11:00

DR Congo	0–0	Mozambique
	Report

Mogwase Stadium
Referee: Allister Barra (Seychelles)
9 December 2016
17:30

Mozambique	2–2	Comoros
Ernesto 45+2'; Langa 75'	Report	Said 10'; Youssouf 90+1'

Mogwase Stadium
Referee: Lebalang Mokete (Lesotho)
12 December 2016 (Note: Game originally played on 11 December 2016, but was abandoned just after Lusuki's goal. The match restarted on 12 December 2016 in the 63rd minute, with the score at 2-0.)
17:30

Comoros	0–2	DR Congo
	Report	Sita 6'; Lusuki 62'

Moruleng Stadium
Referee: Kulasande Qongqo (South Africa)

=== Crossover games ===
Two games were played between teams from different groups as there are fewer teams in Groups B and D than A and C.

13 December 2016
11:00

Zambia	2–0	Mozambique
Phiri 22'; Sakala 80'	Report

Mogwase Stadium
Referee: Jonas Shongedi (Namibia)
13 December 2016
11:00

Malawi	0–1	DR Congo
	Report	Lusuki 25'

Moruleng Stadium
Referee: Tirelo Mositwane (Botswana)

== Knockout stage ==
Semi-finals
14 December — Moruleng Stadium
South Africa	5
Angola	0
14 December — Moruleng Stadium
Zambia	2
DR Congo	1

Final
16 December — Moruleng Stadium
South Africa	1
Zambia	2
Third place
16 December — Moruleng Stadium
Angola	1(3)
DR Congo	1(4)

=== Semi-finals ===
14 December 2016
17:00

South Africa	5–0	Angola
Singh 12', 57', 71', 83'; Ndwandwe 44'	Report

Moruleng Stadium
Referee: Tirelo Mositwane (Botswana)

14 December 2016
19:30

Zambia	2–1	DR Congo
Sakala 37'; B. Musonda 77'	Report	Lukombe 41'

Moruleng Stadium
Referee: Ahmad Heeralall (Mauritius)

=== Third place playoff ===
16 December 2016
11:00

Angola	1–1	DR Congo
Catraio 57' (pen.)	Report	Alves 34' (o.g.)
Penalties
Morais (penalty scored); Yanda (penalty scored); Balanga (penalty missed); Chico Banza (penalty missed); Alves (penalty scored); Miguel (penalty missed)	3–4	Yamba (penalty scored); Amongo (penalty scored); Mudiadia (penalty scored); Sita (penalty missed); Lusuki (penalty missed); Luezi (penalty scored)

Moruleng Stadium
Referee: Lebalang Mokete (Lesotho)

=== Final ===
16 December 2016
17:30

South Africa	1–2	Zambia
Seriba 41'	Report	Kalunga 8'; B. Musonda 85'

Moruleng Stadium
Referee: Nomore Musundire (Zimbabwe)

== Goalscorers ==
63 goals were scored in 24 matches, for an average of 2.63 goals per match.

5 goals

- (South Africa) Luther Singh

4 goals

- (South Africa) Menzi Ndwandwe
- (Sudan) Walaa Eldin Yaqoub
- (Zambia) Fashion Sakala

2 goals

- (Angola) Chico Banza
- (Angola) Vá
- (Democratic Republic of the Congo) Nathan Lusuki
- (Mauritius) Marcus Dimanche
- (South Africa) Sibongakonke Mbatha
- (Zambia) Patson Daka
- (Zambia) Boyd Musonda
- (Zambia) Chrispen Sakulanda

1 goal

- (Angola) Pedro Alves
- (Angola) Zinadine Catraio
- (Angola) Nélson da Luz
- (Comoros) Said Hicham
- (Comoros) Habib Youssouf
- (Democratic Republic of the Congo) Chadrack Lukombe
- (Democratic Republic of the Congo) Ernest Sita
- (Lesotho) Tseliso Botswane
- (Lesotho) Khubetsoana Kamela
- (Lesotho) Thabang Malane
- (Mauritius) Alex Ferre
- (Mauritius) Rudy Vincent
- (Mozambique) Nilton Ernesto
- (Mozambique) Bruno Langa
- (South Africa) Achmat Ceres
- (South Africa) Nkosingiphile Ngcobo
- (South Africa) Kabelo Seriba
- (South Africa) Itumeleng Shopane
- (South Africa) Sifundo Sibiya
- (Sudan) Hassan Hassan
- (Sudan) Khaled Osman
- (Sudan) Ammar Taifour
- (Eswatini) Saviola Gamedze
- (Eswatini) Ali Matse
- (Eswatini) Bhekani Mthembu
- (Zambia) Edward Chilufya
- (Zambia) Kenneth Kalunga
- (Zambia) Joseph Phiri
- (Zimbabwe) Bukhosi Sibanda

Own goal

- (Angola) Pedro Alves (playing against the Democratic Republic of Congo)

Source: COSAFA Under-20 Championships
