= Marcus Dimanche =

Mauritian footballer (born 1998)

Personal information
- Full name: Marcus Dray Dimanche
- Date of birth: 20 May 1998 (age 28)
- Place of birth: Melbourne, Australia
- Height: 1.83 m (6 ft 0 in)
- Positions: Full-back; midfielder

Team information
- Current team: FC Bulleen Lions
- Number: 14

Youth career
- 2011–2012: Southern Bluetongues
- 2012: Central City
- 2013: FFV NTC
- 2014: Bentleigh Greens
- 2015–2016: Melbourne City

Senior career*
Years	Team	Apps	(Gls)
2015–2016	Melbourne City Youth	12	(0)
2017	Richmond SC	27	(0)
2018	Springvale White Eagles	34	(4)
2019–2021	Oakleigh Cannons	10	(0)
2021–2022	Eastern Lions	33	(4)
2023	Preston Lions	17	(1)
2024–	FC Bulleen Lions	1	(0)

International career^{‡}
2016	Mauritius U20	3	(2)
2016	Mauritius	3	(0)
- * Club domestic league appearances and goals as of 06:34, 12 February 2024 (UTC) ‡ National team caps and goals as of 13:34, 20 May 2018 (UTC)

Marcus Dray Dimanche (born 20 May 1998) is a footballer who plays as a midfielder for the FC Bulleen Lions of the Victoria Premier League 1. Born in Australia, he represents the Mauritius national team.

== Club career ==
Dimanche started his career with the Bentleigh Greens, having spent time with the Football Federation Australia-ran National Training Centre. He joined Melbourne City in 2014, and spent time with their youth ranks, before leaving at the end of the 2016 season.

He joined fellow NPL Victoria 2 East side Richmond SC ahead of the 2017 season.

== International career ==
At the youth level he played in the 2016 COSAFA U-20 Cup.

Dimanche made his senior international debut in a qualification game for the 2017 Africa Cup of Nations, replacing Michael Bosqui in the 87th minute of a 0–1 loss to Mozambique.

== Career statistics ==
=== Club ===
As of 26 June 2018.

Club	Season	colspan=as	Continental		Other		Total					
Club	Season	Division	Apps	Goals	Apps	Goals	Apps	Goals	Apps	Goals	Apps	Goals
Melbourne City Youth	2015	NPL Victoria 1	5	0	0	0	–		0	0	5	0
Melbourne City Youth	2016	NPL Victoria 2	7	0	0	0	–		0	0	7	0
Melbourne City Youth	Total		12	0	0	0	–		0	0	12	0
Richmond SC	2017	NPL Victoria 2	27	0	2 (Note: Appearances in the FFA Cup)	0	–		0	0	29	0
Springvale White Eagles	2018	NPL Victoria 2	34	4	0	0	–		0	0	34	4
Career total			73	4	2	0	–		0	0	75	4

=== International ===
As of matches played 25 April 2018.

National team	Year	Apps	Goals
Mauritius	2016	1	0
Mauritius	2017	0	0
Mauritius	2018	2	0
Total		3	0
