= 2013–14 FC Istres season =

FC Istres
2013–14 season
- Chairman: Henry Cremadès
- Manager: José Pasqualetti (until April); Frédéric Arpinon (from April)
- Stadium: Stade Parsemain
- Ligue 2: 19th (relegated)
- Coupe de France: Round of 64
- Coupe de la Ligue: First round

The 2013–14 season was the 94th season in the existence of FC Istres and the fifth consecutive season in the second division of French football. In addition to the domestic league, FC Istres participated in this season's editions of the Coupe de France and the Coupe de la Ligue.

== Players ==
=== First-team squad ===
As of 21 January 2014.

Note: Flags indicate national team as defined under FIFA eligibility rules; some limited exceptions apply. Players may hold more than one non-FIFA nationality.

No.	Pos.	Nation	Player
1	GK	FRA	Arnaud Balijon
4	DF	FRA	Fabien Barrillon
5	DF	FRA	Alain Cantareil
6	DF	CIV	Mamadou Doumbia
7	DF	FRA	Jérôme Leroy
8	MF	SEN	Ibrahima Ba
10	MF	SEN	Bagaliy Dabo
11	FW	MAR	Fouad Chafik
14	MF	FRA	Anthony Belmonte
15	FW	CIV	Guy-Roland Niangbo

No.	Pos.	Nation	Player
16	GK	FRA	Romain Lejeune
18	FW	FRA	Alexis Allart
19	MF	FRA	Cyril Jeunechamp
22	MF	FRA	Florian Tardieu
23	DF	MRI	Michael Bosqui
25	DF	FRA	Vincent Le Goff
26	MF	FRA	Benjamin Mas
27	MF	ALG	Farid Boulaya
28	DF	FRA	Joris Sainati
34	DF	ALG	Kaled Kehiha

== Pre-season and friendlies ==
Win Draw Loss Fixtures

== Competitions ==
=== Overall record ===
Competition	First match	Last match	Starting round	Final position	Record							
Competition	First match	Last match	Starting round	Final position	Pld	W	D	L	GF	GA	GD	Win %
Ligue 2	4 August 2013	16 May 2014	Matchday 1	19th	38	9	9	20	48	74	−26	23.68
Coupe de France	16 November 2013	4 January 2014	Seventh round	Round of 64	3	2	1	0	6	2	+4	66.67
Coupe de la Ligue	6 August 2013		First round	First round	1	0	1	0	2	2	+0	0.00
Total					42	11	11	20	56	78	−22	26.19

Last updated: May 2014
Source: Soccerway

=== Ligue 2 ===
==== League table ====
Pos	Team	Pld	W	D	L	GF	GA	GD	Pts	Promotion or Relegation
16	Auxerre	38	10	13	15	35	45	−10	43	
17	Laval	38	10	12	16	44	52	−8	42	
18	Châteauroux	38	10	10	18	43	59	−16	40	Spared due to the DNCG’s rulings.
19	Istres (R)	38	9	9	20	48	74	−26	36	Relegated, but later readmitted and later relegated.
20	CA Bastia (R)	38	4	12	22	21	63	−42	24	Relegation to Championnat National

Source: Ligue 2
Rules for classification: 1) points; 2) goal difference; 3) number of goals scored.
(R) Relegated

==== Results summary ====
Overall								Home						Away					
Pld	W	D	L	GF	GA	GD	Pts	W	D	L	GF	GA	GD	W	D	L	GF	GA	GD
38	9	9	20	48	74	−26	36	7	5	7	28	31	−3	2	4	13	20	43	−23

Last updated: May 2014.
Source: Ligue 2

==== Results by round ====
Round	1	2	3	4	5	6	7	8	9	10	11	12	13	14	15	16	17	18	19	20	21	22	23	24	25	26	27	28	29	30	31	32	33	34	35	36	37	38
Ground	H	A	H	A	H	A	H	A	H	A	H	A	H	A	H	A	H	A	A	H	A	H	A	H	A	H	A	H	A	H	A	H	A	H	A	H	H	A
Result	L	L	D	D	D	D	W	L	L	L	W	L	L	L	W	L	D	W	L	W	D	W	L	W	W	L	L	D	D	W	L	L	L	D	L	L	L	L
Position	18	20	17	17	18	17	15	16	18	18	17	17	19	19	18	19	19	18	19	15	15	15	17	16	13	18	18	17	17	16	17	18	19	18	19	19	19	19

Source: Ligue 2
A = Away; H = Home; W = Win; D = Draw; L = Loss

==== Matches ====
The league fixtures were announced on 13 June 2013.

2 August 2013 1	Istres	2–4	Angers	Istres
17:30 CEST (UTC+2)				Stadium: Stade Parsemain

12 August 2013 2	Brest	3–1	Istres	Brest
17:30 CEST (UTC+2)				Stadium: Stade Francis-Le Blé

16 August 2013 3	Istres	1–1	CA Bastia	Istres
17:30 CEST (UTC+2)				Stadium: Stade Parsemain

23 August 2013 4	Créteil	2–2	Istres	Créteil
17:30 CEST (UTC+2)				Stadium: Stade Dominique Duvauchelle

30 August 2013 5	Istres	1–1	Auxerre	Istres
17:30 CEST (UTC+2)				Stadium: Stade Parsemain

13 September 2013 6	Tours	2–2	Istres	Tours
17:30 CEST (UTC+2)				Stadium: Stade de la Vallée du Cher

20 September 2013 7	Istres	3–0	Laval	Istres
17:30 CEST (UTC+2)				Stadium: Stade Parsemain

24 September 2013 8	Le Havre	1–0	Istres	Le Havre
17:30 CEST (UTC+2)				Stadium: Stade Océane

27 September 2013 9	Istres	0–2	Troyes	Istres
17:30 CEST (UTC+2)				Stadium: Stade Parsemain

4 October 2013 10	Clermont	2–0	Istres	Clermont-Ferrand
17:30 CEST (UTC+2)				Stadium: Stade Gabriel Montpied

18 October 2013 11	Istres	1–0	Arles-Avignon	Istres
17:30 CEST (UTC+2)				Stadium: Stade Parsemain

25 October 2013 12	Niort	3–1	Istres	Niort
17:30 CEST (UTC+2)				Stadium: Stade René Gaillard

1 November 2013 13	Istres	1–2	Metz	Istres
17:30 CEST (UTC+2)				Stadium: Stade Parsemain

8 November 2013 14	Caen	4–0	Istres	Caen
17:30 CEST (UTC+2)				Stadium: Stade Michel d'Ornano

22 November 2013 15	Istres	4–2	Nîmes	Istres
17:30 CEST (UTC+2)				Stadium: Stade Parsemain

24 January 2014 21	CA Bastia	2–2	Istres	Furiani
17:30 CET (UTC+1)				Stadium: Stade Armand-Cesari
