= Bilel Agueni =

French footballer (born 1995)

Personal information
- Date of birth: 4 January 1995 (age 31)
- Place of birth: Istres, France
- Height: 1.75 m (5 ft 9 in)
- Position: Midfielder

Team information
- Current team: Rousset-Ste Victoire

Senior career*
Years	Team	Apps	(Gls)
2012–2015	Istres	3	(0)
2015–2016	Châteauroux	17	(0)
2017–2018	Marseille Consolat	26	(0)
2018–2021	Aubagne	49	(2)
2021–2024	Hyères	69	(0)
2024–	Rousset-Ste Victoire	9	(0)
- * Club domestic league appearances and goals as of 7 December 2024

Bilel Agueni (born 4 January 1995) is a French professional footballer who plays as a midfielder for Championnat National 3 club Rousset-Ste Victoire. He previously played for Istres, where he made three appearances in Ligue 2 during the 2013–14 season.

== Personal life ==
Bilel Agueni was born in Istres in Southern France. He is of Algerian descent.

== Career statistics ==
As of match played 16 April 2022

Appearances by club, season and competition
Club	Season	League			National cup		League cup		Total	
Club	Season	Division	Apps	Goals	Apps	Goals	Apps	Goals	Apps	Goals
Istres	2013–14	Ligue 2	3	0	0	0	0	0	3	0
Istres	2014–15	National	0	0	0	0	0	0	0	0
Istres	Total		3	0	0	0	0	0	3	0
Châteauroux	2015–16	National	17	0	1	0	1	0	19	0
Châteauroux B	2015–16	CFA 2	9	1	—		—		9	1
Marseille Consolat	2016–17	National	3	0	1	0	0	0	4	0
Marseille Consolat	2017–18	National	23	0	0	0	0	0	23	0
Marseille Consolat	Total		26	0	1	0	0	0	27	0
Aubagne	2018–19	National 3	24	2	0	0	—		24	2
Aubagne	2019–20	National 3	16	0	0	0	—		16	0
Aubagne	2020–21	National 2	9	0	4	0	—		13	0
Aubagne	Total		49	2	4	0	—		43	2
Hyères	2021–22	National 2	23	0	0	0	—		23	0
Career total			127	3	6	0	1	0	134	3
