= Carl Hopprich =

German-born Seychellois footballer

Personal information
- Full name: Carl Jerome Hopprich
- Date of birth: 7 March 1996 (age 30)
- Place of birth: Germany
- Position: Midfielder

Team information
- Current team: Hertha Zehlendorf
- Number: 23

Youth career
- –2015: Hertha Zehlendorf

Senior career*
Years	Team	Apps	(Gls)
2015–	Hertha Zehlendorf	124	(3)

International career^{‡}
2016–	Seychelles	10	(0)
- * Club domestic league appearances and goals as of 1 January 2025 ‡ National team caps and goals as of 20:31, 5 July 2023 (UTC)

Carl Jerome Hopprich (born 7 March 1996) is a German-born Seychellois football player. He plays for NOFV-Oberliga club Hertha Zehlendorf and the Seychelles national team.

== Club career ==
Hopprich started his career with BFC Südring. He then came up through the youth ranks at Hertha Zehlendorf before joining the senior squad in 2015. By the end of the 2020 season, he had made 75 appearances for the club in the NOFV-Oberliga. Following that season, despite an injury that saw him miss the majority of matches, his contract was renewed for another season. His contract was renewed again in February 2022.

== International ==
Hopprich made his Seychelles national football team debut on 2 June 2016 in an Africa Cup of Nations qualifier against Algeria. He was recalled to the national squad after a few-year absence for the 2023 COSAFA Cup. He was one of two foreign-based players in the squad, along with Daryl Louise.
