= Omar Marmoush =

Egyptian footballer (born 1999)

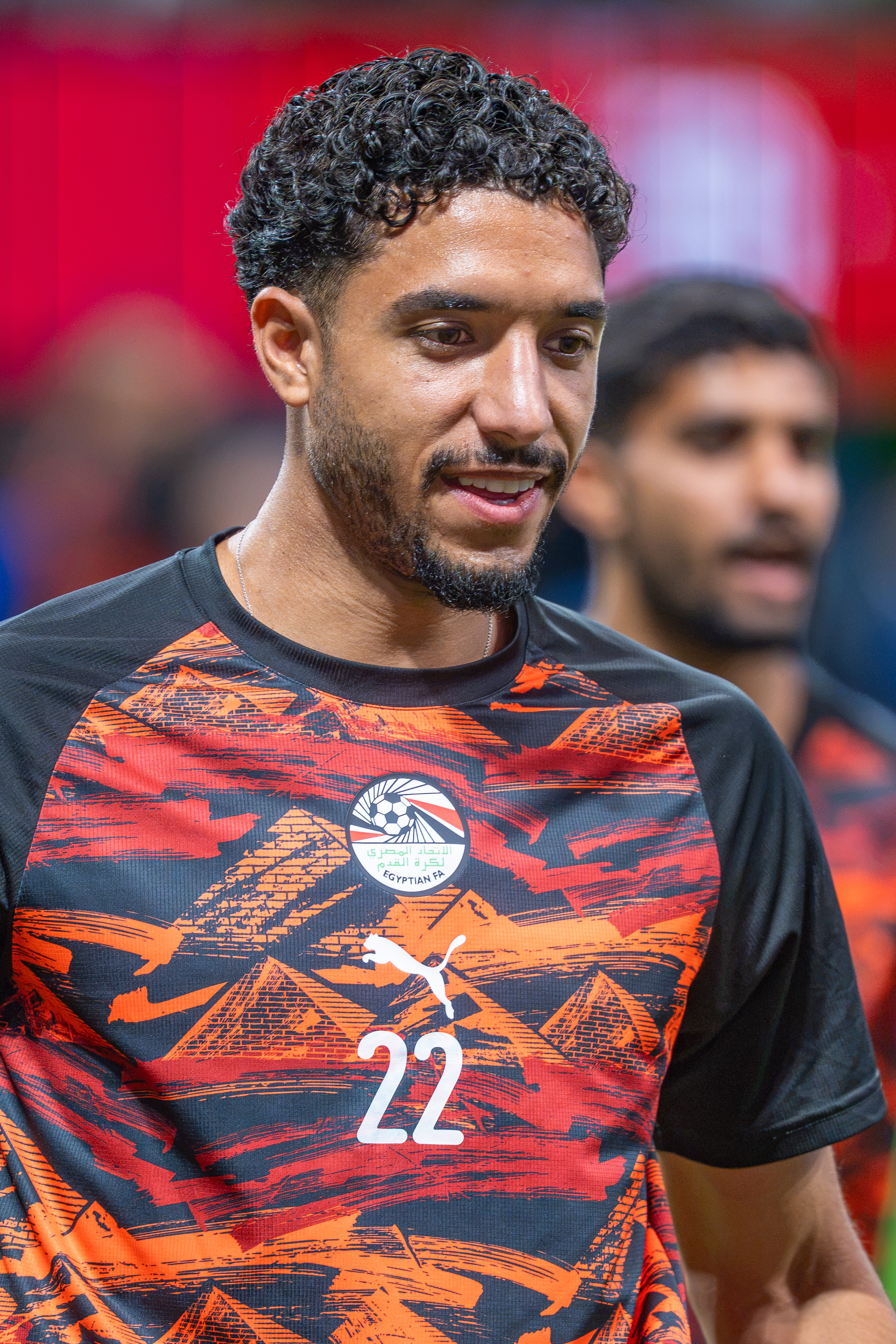
- Marmoush with Egypt in 2026

Personal information
- Full name: Omar Khaled Mohamed Abdelsalam Marmoush
- Date of birth: 7 February 1999 (age 27)
- Place of birth: Cairo, Egypt
- Height: 1.80 m (5 ft 11 in)
- Position: Forward

Team information
- Current team: Tottenham Hotspur (on loan from Manchester City)
- Number: 22

Youth career
- 2005–2016: Wadi Degla

Senior career*
Years	Team	Apps	(Gls)
2016–2017	Wadi Degla	16	(2)
2017–2020	VfL Wolfsburg II	36	(11)
2020–2023	VfL Wolfsburg	41	(5)
2020–2021	→ FC St. Pauli (loan)	21	(7)
2021–2022	→ VfB Stuttgart (loan)	21	(3)
2023–2025	Eintracht Frankfurt	46	(27)
2025–	Manchester City	37	(10)
2026–	→ Tottenham Hotspur (loan)	9	(1)

International career^{‡}
2017–2018	Egypt U20	2	(0)
2019–2020	Egypt U23	4	(3)
2021–	Egypt	59	(14)
Medal record
Representing Egypt
Men's football
Africa Cup of Nations
Runner-up	2021
- * Club domestic league appearances and goals as of 23:04, 7 November 2026 (UTC) ‡ National team caps and goals as of 23:10, 13 November 2026 (UTC)

Omar Khaled Mohamed Abdelsalam Marmoush (Note: Arabic: عمر خالد محمد عبد السلام مرموش) (born 7 February 1999) is an Egyptian professional footballer who plays as a forward for Premier League club Tottenham Hotspur, on loan from Manchester City, and the Egypt national team.

== Early life ==
Marmoush was born on 7 February 1999 in Cairo, Egypt to Egyptian Canadian parents who lived in Canada for six years before resettling in Cairo, therefore making him a dual Egyptian citizen and Canadian citizen. He grew up in Maadi, a district of Cairo, and attended the American International School in Egypt. At age six, he started playing youth football with the Wadi Degla youth academy.

== Club career ==
=== Wadi Degla ===
Marmoush made his professional debut for Wadi Degla in the Egyptian Premier League on 8 July 2016, coming on as a substitute in the match against Al Ittihad Alexandria Club, which finished as a 3–2 win. In total, he made sixteen league appearances for Wadi Degla and scored two goals, before moving to VfL Wolfsburg II in 2017.

=== VfL Wolfsburg ===
On 26 May 2020, Marmoush made his professional debut for Wolfsburg in their 4–1 Bundesliga win over Bayer Leverkusen at the BayArena. Marmoush signed his first professional contract for the club on 23 June. On 5 August 2020, he made his European debut in a 3–0 defeat (5–1 aggregate) against Shakhtar Donetsk in the UEFA Europa League round of 16. Marmoush returned to Wolfsburg after his breakthrough Bundesliga season with Stuttgart.

On 5 January 2021, Marmoush was loaned to FC St. Pauli for the remainder of the season. He played 21 games and scored seven goals for the club.

On 30 August 2021, Marmoush was loaned out to VfB Stuttgart until the end of the season. He scored a last minute equaliser against Eintracht Frankfurt on his debut. He was later named Bundesliga rookie of the month for September 2021. On 11 December 2021, Marmoush faced his parent club Wolfsburg and assisted Konstantinos Mavropanos's goal and in the 79th minute, Marmoush stepped up to take a penalty and he missed by hitting his panenka attempt off the crossbar. Marmoush was also named Bundesliga Rookie of the Month for March 2022. He completed his loan spell having scored three goals in 21 games.

On 30 July 2022, Marmoush scored his first goal for Wolfsburg in a 1–0 first round DFB-Pokal match against Carl Zeiss Jena. Marmoush scored his first Bundesliga goal for the club in a 3–2 win over his former loan club VFB Stuttgart. On 24 January 2023, Marmoush scored his first goal in 2023 in a 5–0 rout over relegation strugglers Hertha BSC. Marmoush haunted his former club Stuttgart again, as he scored the only goal in a 1–0 win at the MHPArena. Marmoush finished the season with 36 appearances, six goals and one assist in all competitions.

=== Eintracht Frankfurt ===
==== 2023–24 season ====
On 15 May 2023, it was announced that Marmoush would join Eintracht Frankfurt on a free transfer ahead of the 2023–24 season, and wear the number seven shirt. On 13 August, Marmoush scored his first goal for Eintracht Frankfurt in a 7–0 win over 1. FC Lokomotive Leipzig in the first round of the DFB-Pokal. On 27 August 2023, Marmoush scored his first Bundesliga goal for the club in a 1–1 draw against Mainz 05. On 21 September, he scored his first goal in European competitions from a penalty in a 2–1 win over Aberdeen during the Europa Conference League.

Marmoush scored 16 goals in 37 appearances in all competitions in his debut season. He attracted transfer interest from Premier League clubs such as Arsenal, Liverpool, Newcastle United and Tottenham Hotspur thanks to his magnificent debut season for Die Adler. Marmoush scored a brace in Frankfurt's 3–3 draw with Borussia Dortmund and a goal in their thumping 5–1 win against Bayern. With 12 goals in the 2023–24 season, Marmoush became the third-highest African goal scorer in Bundesliga. Marmoush scored a crucial penalty against RB Leipzig to tie the match 2–2 to help Frankfurt qualify for the 2024–25 Europa League.

==== 2024–25 season ====
Marmoush contributed six goals and three assists in September, which earned him the Bundesliga Player of the Month award. During that month, he scored a brace in a 2–1 victory against his former club VfL Wolfsburg, and provided decisive goals in matches against Borussia Mönchengladbach and Holstein Kiel, overtaking Harry Kane as the league's top scorer during this period.

In the Europa League, Marmoush made significant contributions, including a penalty against Besiktas and free-kick goals against Slavia Prague. His ability to score from set pieces was highlighted by three consecutive free-kick goals in November.

Marmoush completed the first half of the 2024–25 Bundesliga season as the second top scorer, behind Kane, with 15 goals, breaking his club's previous record for the Hinrunde set by Theofanis Gekas in the 2010–11 season.

=== Manchester City ===
==== 2024–25 season ====
On 23 January 2025, Premier League club Manchester City announced the signing of Marmoush on a four-and-a-half-year deal for a reported fee of £59 million. He made his debut for the club on 25 January in a 3–1 home league win over Chelsea. On 15 February, he scored three goals for City in a 4–0 home league win over Newcastle United, netting his first career hat-trick. Marmoush scored his first FA Cup goal on 30 March as a substitute for Erling Haaland, netting the winner in a 2–1 away victory over Bournemouth in the quarter-finals, sending City through to their seventh straight FA Cup semi-final. However, he missed a penalty kick in the final. On 20 May, Marmoush opened the scoring in City's 3–1 home win against Bournemouth in the Premier League, a long range effort that went into the top corner of Kepa Arrizabalaga's goal via the post. On 31 May, it was announced that the goal had won the Premier League Goal of the Season award.

==== 2025–26 season ====
On 29 October 2025, Marmoush scored his first goal of the 2025–26 season in a 3–1 win over Swansea City in the fourth round of the EFL Cup.

After returning from the Africa Cup of Nations with Egypt, he scored his first Premier League goal of the season in a 2–0 win over Wolverhampton Wanderers on 24 January 2026. On 4 February, he scored twice in a 3–1 win over Newcastle United in the second leg of the EFL Cup semi-final.

==== Loan to Tottenham Hotspur ====
On 27 August 2026, fellow Premier League club Tottenham Hotspur announced the signing of Marmoush on an initial season-long loan, with an obligation to buy at the end of the loan spell.

He made his debut for Tottenham Hotspur on 29 August 2026 against Newcastle United where Tottenham lost 2–0 by goals from Anthony Elanga and Yoane Wissa. Marmoush scored his first Tottenham goal in a 3–1 home league victory over Coventry City.

== International career ==
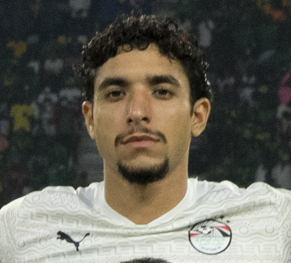
Marmoush with Egypt in 2022

Marmoush was eligible to play for Egypt and Canada, due to him also holding Canadian citizenship, before becoming cap-tied with the Egypt national team in October 2021.

Marmoush was included in Egypt's squad for the 2017 Africa U-20 Cup of Nations in Zambia. He made two appearances during the tournament, in which Egypt were eliminated in the group stage.

On 8 October 2021, Marmoush made his debut for the Egypt national team and scored the only goal in a 1–0 victory over Libya. On 29 December 2021, Marmoush was named in Egypt's 28-man squad for the 2021 Africa Cup of Nations. He played in all three group stage matches, as well as all four knockout ties en route to the final against Senegal, which ended in a 4–2 loss on penalties for Egypt.

On 19 March 2022, Marmoush was called up for Egypt's 2022 FIFA World Cup qualification third round matches against Senegal. He played in both matches as Egypt were defeated 3–1 on penalties and knocked out of World Cup contention. On 27 September, Marmoush scored the opening goal as Egypt beat Liberia 3–0 in a friendly match.

On 24 March 2023, Marmoush scored the second goal for Egypt in a 2–0 victory over Malawi during the 2023 Africa Cup of Nations qualification. Four days later, he scored in a 4–0 away victory over the same opponent. At the 2023 Africa Cup of Nations, Marmoush scored the equaliser in a 2–2 draw against Ghana to help Egypt qualify for the last 16.

On 2 December 2025, Marmoush was called up to the Egypt squad for the 2025 Africa Cup of Nations. He scored twice at the tournament as Egypt reached the semi-finals, losing to eventual winners Senegal. On 17 January 2026, in the third-place play-off against Nigeria, Marmoush was one of two Egyptian players to have their kicks saved in a 4–2 penalty shoot-out loss.

On 31 May 2026, Marmoush was named in Hossam Hassan's 26-man Egypt squad for the 2026 FIFA World Cup.

== Personal life ==
Marmoush is a Muslim, and is often seen doing the sujud after scoring a goal. He is a trilingual who speaks fluent Arabic, German, and English.

== Career statistics ==
=== Club ===
As of match played 7 November 2026

Appearances and goals by club, season and competition
Club	Season	League			National cup (Note: Includes Egypt Cup, DFB-Pokal, FA Cup)		League cup (Note: Includes EFL Cup)		Continental		Other		Total	
Club	Season	Division	Apps	Goals	Apps	Goals	Apps	Goals	Apps	Goals	Apps	Goals	Apps	Goals
Wadi Degla	2015–16	Egyptian Premier League	1	0	0	0	—		—		—		1	0
Wadi Degla	2016–17	Egyptian Premier League	15	2	2	1	—		—		—		17	3
Wadi Degla	Total		16	2	2	1	—		—		—		18	3
VfL Wolfsburg II	2017–18	Regionalliga Nord	14	1	—		—		—		—		14	1
VfL Wolfsburg II	2018–19	Regionalliga Nord	5	0	—		—		—		—		5	0
VfL Wolfsburg II	2019–20	Regionalliga Nord	15	9	—		—		—		—		15	9
VfL Wolfsburg II	2020–21	Regionalliga Nord	2	1	—		—		—		—		2	1
VfL Wolfsburg II	Total		36	11	—		—		—		—		36	11
VfL Wolfsburg	2019–20	Bundesliga	5	0	1	0	—		1 (Note: Appearance(s) in UEFA Europa League)	0	—		7	0
VfL Wolfsburg	2020–21	Bundesliga	1	0	2	0	—		—		—		3	0
VfL Wolfsburg	2021–22	Bundesliga	2	0	0	0	—		—		—		2	0
VfL Wolfsburg	2022–23	Bundesliga	33	5	3	1	—		—		—		36	6
VfL Wolfsburg	Total		41	5	6	1	—		1	0	—		48	6
FC St. Pauli (loan)	2020–21	2. Bundesliga	21	7	—		—		—		—		21	7
VfB Stuttgart (loan)	2021–22	Bundesliga	21	3	0	0	—		—		—		21	3
Eintracht Frankfurt	2023–24	Bundesliga	29	12	3	1	—		9 (Note: Appearances in UEFA Europa Conference League)	4	—		41	17
Eintracht Frankfurt	2024–25	Bundesliga	17	15	3	1	—		6	4	—		26	20
Eintracht Frankfurt	Total		46	27	6	2	—		15	8	—		67	37
Manchester City	2024–25	Premier League	16	7	4	1	—		2 (Note: Appearances in UEFA Champions League)	0	3 (Note: Appearances in FIFA Club World Cup)	0	25	8
Manchester City	2025–26	Premier League	21	3	5	2	2	3	8	0	—		36	8
Manchester City	2026–27	Premier League	0	0	—		—		—		1 (Note: Appearance in FA Community Shield)	0	1	0
Manchester City	Total		37	10	9	3	2	3	10	0	4	0	62	16
Tottenham Hotspur (loan)	2026–27	Premier League	9	1	0	0	1	0	—		—		10	1
Career total			226	66	23	7	3	3	26	8	4	0	282	84

=== International ===
As of match played 13 November 2026

Appearances and goals by national team and year
National team	Year	Apps	Goals
Egypt	2021	2	1
Egypt	2022	13	1
Egypt	2023	9	2
Egypt	2024	11	2
Egypt	2025	7	3
Egypt	2026	17	5
Total		59	14

As of match played 13 November 2026

Egypt score listed first, score column indicates score after each Marmoush goal

List of international goals scored by Omar Marmoush
No.	Date	Venue	Opponent	Score	Result	Competition
1	8 October 2021	Borg El Arab Stadium, Borg El Arab, Egypt	Libya	1–0	1–0	2022 FIFA World Cup qualification
2	27 September 2022	Borg El Arab Stadium, Borg El Arab, Egypt	Liberia	1–0	3–0	Friendly
3	24 March 2023	30 June Stadium, Cairo, Egypt	Malawi	2–0	2–0	2023 Africa Cup of Nations qualification
4	28 March 2023	Bingu National Stadium, Lilongwe, Malawi	Malawi	2–0	4–0	2023 Africa Cup of Nations qualification
5	18 January 2024	Felix Houphouet Boigny Stadium, Abidjan, Ivory Coast	Ghana	1–1	2–2	2023 Africa Cup of Nations
6	6 September 2024	Cairo International Stadium, Cairo, Egypt	Cape Verde	2–0	3–0	2025 Africa Cup of Nations qualification
7	5 September 2025	Cairo International Stadium, Cairo, Egypt	Ethiopia	2–0	2–0	2026 FIFA World Cup qualification
8	17 November 2025	Hazza bin Zayed Stadium, Al Ain, United Arab Emirates	Cape Verde	1–1	1–1 (2–0 p)	2025 Al Ain International Cup
9	22 December 2025	Adrar Stadium, Agadir, Morocco	Zimbabwe	1–1	2–1	2025 Africa Cup of Nations
10	10 January 2026	Adrar Stadium, Agadir, Morocco	Ivory Coast	1–0	3–2	2025 Africa Cup of Nations
11	27 March 2026	King Abdullah Sports City Stadium, Jeddah, Saudi Arabia	Saudi Arabia	4–0	4–0	Friendly
12	29 September 2026	Juba Stadium, Juba, South Sudan	South Sudan	2–0	5–0	2027 Africa Cup of Nations qualification
13	29 September 2026	Juba Stadium, Juba, South Sudan	South Sudan	4–0	5–0	2027 Africa Cup of Nations qualification
14	13 November 2026	Cairo International Stadium, Cairo, Egypt	Malawi	2–0	5–0	2027 Africa Cup of Nations qualification

== Honours ==
VfL Wolfsburg II

- Regionalliga Nord: 2018–19

Manchester City

- FA Cup: 2025–26
- EFL Cup: 2025–26

Egypt

- Africa Cup of Nations runner-up: 2021

Individual

- Premier League Goal of the Season: 2024–25
- Bundesliga Player of the Month: September 2024, November 2024
- Bundesliga Rookie of the Month: September 2021, March 2022
