= Menzi Ndwandwe =

South African footballer

Personal information
- Full name: Menzi Banele Ndwandwe
- Date of birth: 1 July 1997 (age 29)
- Place of birth: KwaMakhutha, South Africa
- Height: 1.85 m (6 ft 1 in)
- Position: Midfielder

Team information
- Current team: Magesi
- Number: 29

Youth career
- –2015: KZN Academy

Senior career*
Years	Team	Apps	(Gls)
2015–2017	AmaZulu	5	(0)
2018–2020	Uthongathi	51	(18)
2020–2021	Bloemfontein Celtic	13	(1)
2021	Royal AM	0	(0)
2021–2022	TS Galaxy	11	(2)
2022–2023	All Stars	25	(11)
2023–2024	Chippa United	11	(0)
2024–	Magesi	1	(0)

International career^{‡}
2016	South Africa U20	6	(4)
- * Club domestic league appearances and goals as of 3 October 2024 ‡ National team caps and goals as of 16 December 2017

Menzi Banele Ndwandwe (born 1 July 1997) is a South African soccer player who plays as a midfielder for Magesi of the South African Partnership League.

At the youth international level he played in the 2016 COSAFA U-20 Cup.

== Career statistics ==
=== Club ===
As of 20 May 2018.

Club	Season	League			Cup		Other		Total	
Club	Season	Division	Apps	Goals	Apps	Goals	Apps	Goals	Apps	Goals
AmaZulu	2015–16	National First Division	5	0	0	0	–		5	0
Uthongathi	2017–18	National First Division	6	0	0	0	–		6	0
Total			11	0	0	0	–		11	0
