= Daryl Louise =

Seychelles footballer

Personal information
- Full name: Daryl Bertrand Louise
- Date of birth: 12 August 1998 (age 28)
- Place of birth: Seychelles
- Position: Defender

Team information
- Current team: Abingdon United

Senior career*
Years	Team	Apps	(Gls)
2017–2018	Northern Dynamo		
2019–2021	Mansfield Road	16	(5)
2021–	Abingdon United	45	(0)

International career^{‡}
2016	Seychelles U20	2	(0)
2023–	Seychelles	4	(0)
- * Club domestic league appearances and goals ‡ National team caps and goals as of 00:22, 11 July 2023 (UTC)

Daryl Louise (born 12 August 1998) is a Seychellois footballer who currently plays for Abingdon United F.C. and the Seychelles national team.

== Club career ==
In 2014, Louise was part of the Seychelles national under-17 team that competed in the Seychelles Division Two. The following year he played with the national under-16 team in the Third Division and was given the team's Best Player Award following the season.

By 2017, Louise had joined Northern Dynamo FC of the Seychelles Division One. That season the club reached the final of the Seychelles League Cup with a victory over Anse Réunion FC in the semi-final. Louise featured in defense for the club in the victory. Northern Dynamo FC went on to defeat Saint Louis Suns United FC in the final to win the tournament.

In September 2019 Louise joined the English club Mansfield Road FC of the Oxfordshire Senior Football League. In March 2020 he scored in a 2–0 victory over Cropredy FC in the final match before football in Britain was halted because of the COVID-19 pandemic. Before his departure in May 2021, he made sixteen league appearances for the club, scoring five goals, and an additional two appearances and three tallies in the Presidents Cup.

For the 2021/22 season, Louise moved to Abingdon United F.C. of the Hellenic Football League Division One. During his first season with the club, he made twenty-one league appearances. The following season, Abingdon United was in the race for promotion to the Premier Division with Louise in defense. The 2022–23 Hellenic Football League#Division One following season, the club played a memorable season in which it placed seventh in the table. Following a victory over league champions Pershore Town on the final matchday, Abingdon manager John Mills accredited the team's season in large part to Louise and his defensive partner Dan Chalmers.

== International career ==
At the youth level, Louise represented the Seychelles at the 2016 COSAFA U-20 Cup. He had earned a late red card in the team's opening defeat to Mauritius. Following his one-match suspension, he returned to the starting lineup for a 0–5 defeat to Sudan to end the Seychelles' campaign.

In March 2023 he was named to the senior national team for two friendlies away to Bangladesh. He was one of only two foreign-based players in the squad, along with Michael Mancienne. Louise went on to make his debut in the opening 0–1 defeat on 25 March. He earned his second cap three days later as Seychelles won 1–0. In the second match, Louise drew a penalty from Md Saad Uddin in the box which was then converted by Mancienne for the winning goal.

In summer 2023 he was named to the Seychelles squad for the 2023 COSAFA Cup. He was again one of two legionnaires in the squad, along with Carl Hopprich of German club Hertha Zehlendorf.

=== International career statistics ===
As of match played 9 July 2023

Seychelles national team
Year	Apps	Goals
2023	4	0
Total	4	0
