= Mor Nguer =

Senegalese footballer

Personal information
- Full name: Mor Talla Nguer
- Date of birth: 9 November 1997 (age 29)
- Place of birth: Saint-Louis, Senegal
- Position: Midfielder

Senior career*
Years	Team	Apps	(Gls)
–2019	Gorée		
2019–2021	Pau II	5	(1)
2019–2021	Pau	7	(0)
2021	Pohronie	3	(0)
2022–2023	Arras	?	(?)
2023–	Lozère	?	(?)

International career
2017	Senegal U20	2	(0)
2016	Senegal	0	(0)
Medal record
Men's football
Representing Senegal
Africa U-20 Cup of Nations
Runner-up	2017 Zambia
- * Club domestic league appearances and goals as of 22:04, 23 January 2024 (UTC)

Mor Nguer (born 9 November 1997) is a Senegalese football midfielder.

== Club career ==
=== FK Pohronie ===
Nguer made his Fortuna Liga debut for Pohronie in an away fixture against Tatran Liptovský Mikuláš, coming on as a half-time replacement for Ladji Mallé, with the score at 2:0 in favour of Tatran. Despite Miloš Lačný's goal in the 60th minute, Pohronie lost the game 5–1.
