= Simon Omossola =

Cameroonian footballer

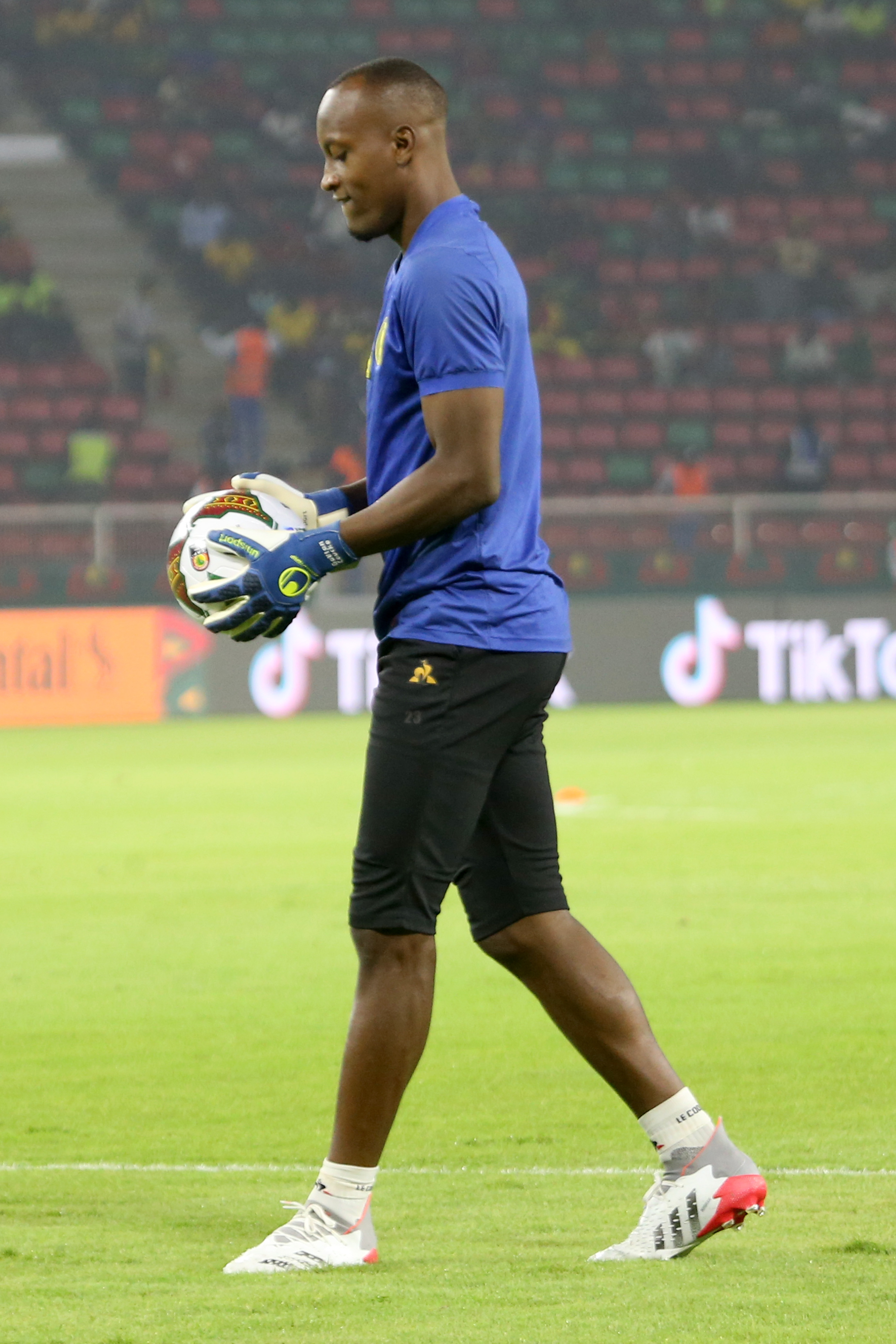
- Omossola with Cameroon at the 2021 Africa Cup of Nations

Personal information
- Full name: Medjo Simon Loti Omossola
- Date of birth: 5 May 1998 (age 28)
- Place of birth: Yaoundé, Cameroon
- Height: 1.88 m (6 ft 2 in)
- Position: Goalkeeper

Team information
- Current team: Saint-Éloi Lupopo
- Number: 30

Senior career*
| Years | Team | Apps | (Gls) |
| 2015–2020 | Coton Sport | 20 | (0) |
| 2020–2023 | AS Vita | 33 | (0) |
| 2023– | Saint-Éloi Lupopo | 5 | (0) |

International career^{‡}
| 2017 | Cameroon U20 | 2 | (0) |
| 2019 | Cameroon U23 | 3 | (0) |
| 2019– | Cameroon | 4 | (0) |
Medal record
Men's football
Representing Cameroon
Africa Cup of Nations
| Third place | 2021 Cameroon |
- * Club domestic league appearances and goals as of 20:11, 28 October 2023 (UTC) ‡ National team caps and goals as of 22:17, 6 June 2025 (UTC)

Medjo Simon Loti Omossola (born 5 May 1998) is a Cameroonian professional footballer who plays as a goalkeeper for Linafoot club Saint-Éloi Lupopo and the Cameroon national team.

== Club career ==
=== Saint-Éloi Lupopo ===
On 20 December 2022, Saint-Éloi Lupopo confirmed the official signing of Omossola.

== International career ==
Omossola represented the Cameroon national team in a 2–1 friendly win over Zambia on 9 June 2019.

== Career statistics ==
As of match played 6 June 2025

Appearances and goals by national team and year
| National team | Year | Apps | Goals |
|---|---|---|---|
| Cameroon | 2019 | 1 | 0 |
| Cameroon | 2021 | 2 | 0 |
| Cameroon | 2025 | 1 | 0 |
| Total | | 4 | 0 |

== Honours ==
=== Coton Sport ===
- Elite One: 2015, 2018

=== Cameroon ===
- Third AFCON Tournament 2021-22.
