= Ishag Adam =

Sudanese footballer

Personal information
- Full name: Ishag Adam Abdalla Mohamed
- Date of birth: 1 January 1999 (age 27)
- Place of birth: Sudan
- Height: 1.80 m (5 ft 11 in)
- Position: Goalkeeper

Team information
- Current team: Hilal Alsahil SC
- Number: 30

Senior career*
| Years | Team | Apps | (Gls) |
| 2014-2016 | Al-Merrikh SC (Kosti) | | |
| 2017 | Osoud Darfur SC (Al-Fasher) | | |
| 2018-2021 | Al-Ahly Shendi | | |
| 2021-2023 | Al-Hilal Club | | |
| 2024-2025 | Al-Ahly SC (Merowe) | | |
| 2025 | Al-Merrikh SC (Kosti) | | |
| 2025-2026 | Al-Saham SC (Al-Damer) | | |
| 2026- | Hilal Alsahil SC | | |

International career^{‡}
| 2018– | Sudan | 1 | (0) |
- * Club domestic league appearances and goals as of 14 August 2026 ‡ National team caps and goals as of 11 October 2021

Ishag Adam Abdalla Mohamed (born 1 January 1999) is a Sudanese professional footballer who plays as a goalkeeper for Al-Hilal Omdurman and the Sudan national football team.
