= Itumeleng Shopane =

South African footballer (born 1997)

Personal information
- Date of birth: 16 June 1997 (age 29)
- Place of birth: Taung, North West, South Africa
- Height: 1.77 m (5 ft 10 in)
- Position: Centre forward

Senior career*
Years	Team	Apps	(Gls)
2016-2017	Kaizer Chiefs B		
2017-2018	→ All Stars (loan)	11	(0)
2018-2019	Kaizer Chiefs B		
2019-	Swallows (loan)	15	(1)

International career
- South Africa U20
2019–	South Africa U23		
- * Club domestic league appearances and goals

Itumeleng Shopane (born 16 June 1997) is a South African professional soccer player who plays as a centre forward for National First Division side Swallows on loan from Kaizer Chiefs B.

== Club career ==
=== Kaizer Chiefs B ===
In 2016, Shopane joined South Africa's PSL Reserve League side Kaizer Chiefs B, then in 2017 he was loaned to National First Division (NVD) side Cape Town All Stars.

== International career ==
=== South Africa U20 ===
He played at the 2016 COSAFA U-20 Cup and the 2017 Africa U-20 Cup of Nations.

=== South Africa U23 ===
On 1 November 2019, Shopane was called up by coach David Notoane to join the South Africa national under-23 football team during the 2019 Africa U-23 Cup of Nations that was held in Egypt.
