= Arnaud Balijon =

French footballer (born 1983)

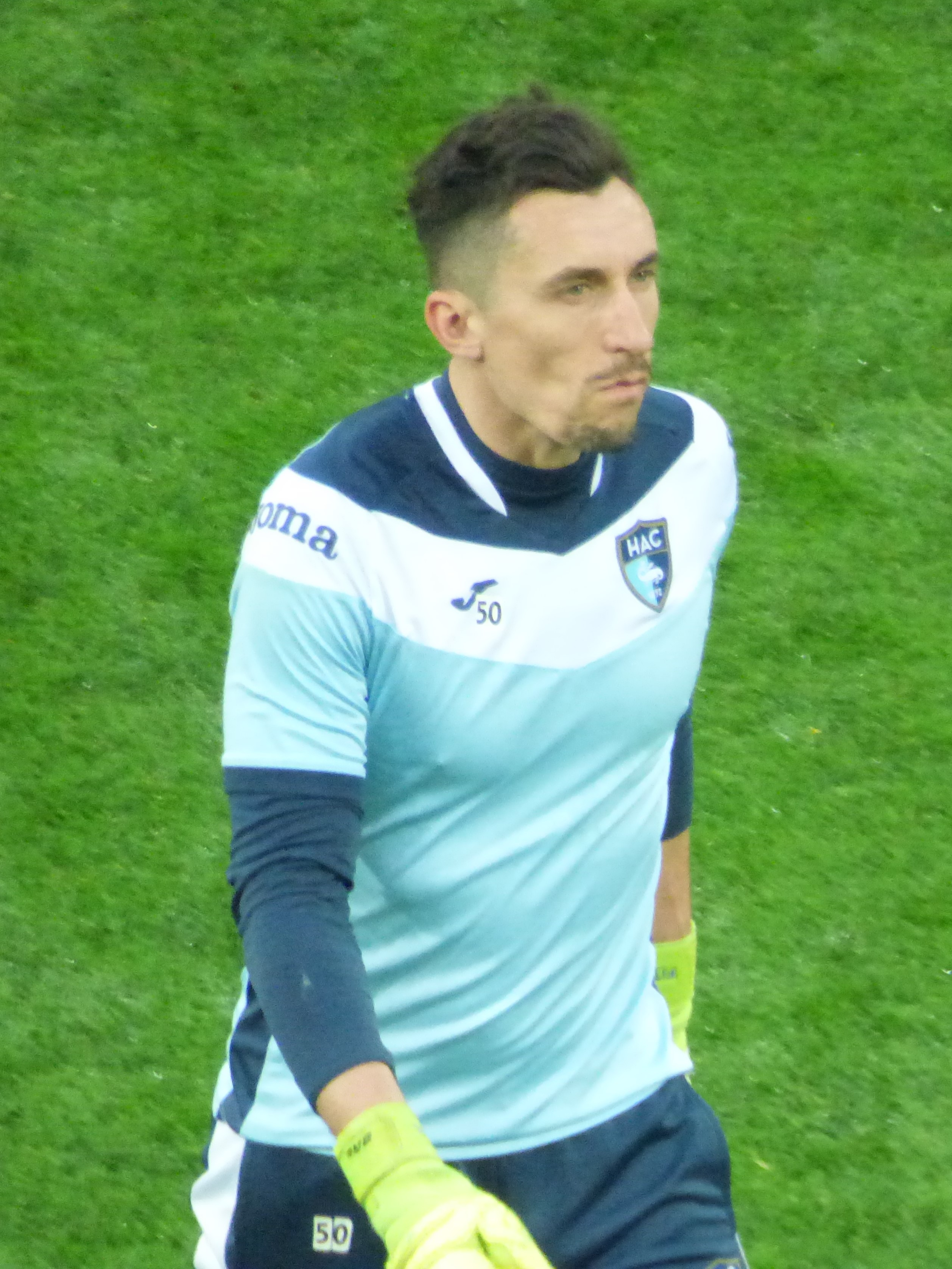
- Balijon with Le Havre in 2019

Personal information
- Date of birth: 17 June 1983 (age 43)
- Place of birth: Reims, France
- Height: 1.82 m (6 ft 0 in)
- Position: Goalkeeper

Team information
- Current team: Cannes
- Number: 16

Senior career*
| Years | Team | Apps | (Gls) |
| 2001–2006 | Reims | 74 | (0) |
| 2006–2013 | Laval | 243 | (0) |
| 2013–2014 | Istres | 22 | (0) |
| 2014–2015 | Orléans | 7 | (0) |
| 2015–2018 | Red Star | 35 | (0) |
| 2018–2019 | Le Havre | 20 | (0) |
| 2018–2019 | Le Havre B | 3 | (0) |
| 2019–2021 | Gazélec Ajaccio | 32 | (0) |
| 2021–2022 | Bastia-Borgo | 34 | (0) |
| 2022–2024 | Dunkerque | 37 | (0) |
| 2024– | Cannes | 7 | (0) |
- * Club domestic league appearances and goals as of 19 October 2024

Arnaud Balijon (born 17 June 1983) is a French professional footballer who plays as a goalkeeper for Championnat National 1 club Cannes.

== Club career ==
On 22 June 2022, Balijon signed with Dunkerque.
