= Pepé Alves =

Angolan footballer

Personal information
- Full name: Pedro Correia Alves
- Date of birth: 17 September 1999 (age 27)
- Place of birth: Uige, Angola
- Position: Defender

Team information
- Current team: Progresso Sambizanga

Youth career
- –2016: Progresso Sambizanga
- 2018–2021: 1º de Agosto

Senior career*
Years	Team	Apps	(Gls)
2016–2017	Progresso Sambizanga	3	(0)
2018–2021	1º de Agosto	3	(0)
2020-2022	Progresso Sambizanga	23	(0)

International career^{‡}
2016	Angola U20	14	(1)
2016–	Angola	4	(0)
- * Club domestic league appearances and goals as of 11:44, 22 January 2020 (UTC) ‡ National team caps and goals as of 11:44, 9 July 2019 (UTC)

Pedro "Pepé" Correia Alves (born 17 September 1999) is an Angolan footballer who currently plays as a defender for Progresso Sambizanga.

== Career statistics ==
=== Club ===
As of 22 January 2020.

Club	Season	League			Cup		Continental		Other		Total	
Club	Season	Division	Apps	Goals	Apps	Goals	Apps	Goals	Apps	Goals	Apps	Goals
Progresso Sambizanga	2016	Girabola	2	0	0	0	–		0	0	2	0
Progresso Sambizanga	2017	Girabola	1	0	0	0	–		0	0	1	0
Progresso Sambizanga	Total		3	0	0	0	0	0	0	0	3	0
1º de Agosto	2018	Girabola	0	0	0	0	–		0	0	0	0
1º de Agosto	2018–19	Girabola	10	0	0	0	–		0	0	0	0
1º de Agosto	Total		0	0	0	0	0	0	0	0	0	0
Progresso Sambizanga	2019–20	Girabola	23	0	0	0	–		0	0	1	0
Career total			33	0	0	0	0	0	0	0	4	0

=== International ===
As of matches played 21 May 2018.

National team	Year	Apps	Goals
Angola	2016	2	0
Angola	2017	0	0
Angola	2018	0	0
Total		2	0
