= Michael Bosqui =

Mauritian footballer (born 1990)

Michaël Bosqui
Personal information
- Full name: Michaël Georges Bosqui
- Date of birth: 2 February 1990 (age 36)
- Place of birth: Fos-sur-Mer, France
- Height: 1.80 m (5 ft 11 in)
- Position: Defender

Team information
- Current team: Fos

Senior career*
Years	Team	Apps	(Gls)
2010–2012	Fos		
2012–2015	Istres	31	(1)
2015–2016	Bastia	37	(1)
2017–	Fos	29	(1)

International career^{‡}
2016	Mauritius	1	(0)
- * Club domestic league appearances and goals as of 7 December 2024 ‡ National team caps and goals as of 15 June 2016

Michaël Bosqui (born 2 February 1990) is a professional footballer who plays for Championnat National 3 side Fos. Born in France, he has represented Mauritius internationally.

== Career ==
=== Senior career ===
He began his career in the team of his city Etoile Sportive Fosséenne (a.k.a. Fos) in season 2010-2011.

In the 2012 Summer, Bosqui moved to FC Istres in Ligue 2.

In February 2015, Bosqui moved to CA Bastia.

=== International career ===
Justin has called up to play for Mauritius in 2016.
