= Sibongakonke Mbatha =

South African footballer (born 1998)

Personal information
- Full name: Sibongakonke Ntuthuko Mbatha
- Date of birth: 1 January 1998 (age 28)
- Place of birth: Ulundi, KwaZulu-Natal, South Africa
- Height: 1.55 m (5 ft 1 in)
- Position: Midfielder

Youth career
- 2015–2016: Transnet School of Excellence
- 2016: Bidvest Wits

Senior career*
Years	Team	Apps	(Gls)
2017–2019	Bidvest Wits		
2017	→ Platinum Stars (loan)	7	(0)
2018	→ ATK (loan)	3	(1)
2019–2021	TS Sporting		
2021–2022	University of Pretoria		

International career
2015	South Africa U17	6	(0)
2017	South Africa U20	8	(1)
- * Club domestic league appearances and goals

Sibongakonke Ntuthuko Mbatha (born 1 January 1998) is a South African professional footballer who plays as a midfielder.

He has been capped by South Africa at the under-17 and under-20 levels.
