= Moses Nyondo =

Zambian footballer (born 1997)

Personal information
- Full name: Moses Nyondo
- Date of birth: 5 July 1997 (age 29)
- Place of birth: Zambia
- Height: 1.83 m (6 ft 0 in)
- Position: Center-back

Team information
- Current team: Nkana

Senior career*
Years	Team	Apps	(Gls)
2017–	Nkana		

International career^{‡}
2017	Zambia U20	10	(0)
2019–	Zambia U23	3	(0)
2019–	Zambia	2	(0)
- * Club domestic league appearances and goals ‡ National team caps and goals as of 18 October 2019

Moses Nyondo (born 5 July 1997) is a Zambian footballer who plays as a defender for Nkana and the Zambia national football team.
