= Ammar Taifour =

American-Sudanese footballer

Personal information
- Full name: Ammar Kamaleldin Taifour
- Date of birth: 12 April 1997 (age 29)
- Place of birth: Kentucky, United States
- Position: Midfielder

Senior career*
Years	Team	Apps	(Gls)
2018	Washington Elite FC		
2019–2020	Bastia	15	(2)
2020–2024	Al Merrikh		
2024–2025	Al Ahli Tripoli		
2025	Al-Hilal Benghazi	14	(1)
2025–2026	CS Sfaxien	16	(0)

International career^{‡}
2017	Sudan U20	3	(0)
2020–	Sudan	20	(0)
- * Club domestic league appearances and goals as of 30 July 2026 ‡ National team caps and goals as of 3 January 2026

Ammar Kamaleldin Taifour (Arabic: عَمَّار كَمَال الدِّيْن طَيْفُور; born 12 April 1997) is a footballer who plays as a midfielder. Born in the United States, he plays for the Sudan national team.

== Career ==
=== Club career ===
In 2019, he signed for Italian side Bastia. In 2020, Taifour signed for Al Merrikh in Sudan.

=== International career ===
Taifour was born in the United States to Sudanese parents, and has dual American-Sudanese citizenship. In 2020, he opted to play for the Sudan national team.
