= Hyundai =

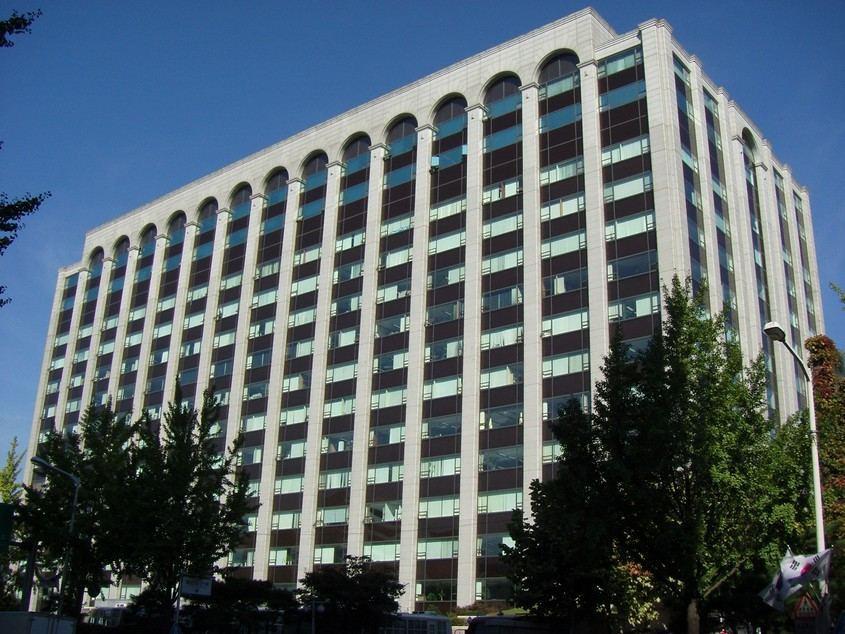
Hyundai Headquarter Building, Jongno-gu, Seoul, South Korea

Hyundai is a former South Korean industrial conglomerate ("chaebol"), which was restructured into the following groups:

- Hyundai Group, parts of the former conglomerate which have not been divested
  - Hyundai Asan, a real estate construction and civil engineering company
- Hyundai Motor Group, the automotive part of the former conglomerate which also owns Kia and Genesis
  - Hyundai Motor Company, an automobile manufacturer
  - Hyundai Mobis, a car parts company
  - Hyundai Motorsport, a racing team
  - Hyundai Rotem, a manufacturer of railway vehicles, defense systems, and factory equipment
  - Hyundai Engineering and Construction, a construction company
- HD Hyundai Group, the heavy industry part of the former conglomerate
  - HD Hyundai Heavy Industries, the primary company representing the group
  - HD Hyundai Mipo, a shipbuilding company
  - HD Hyundai Samho, a shipbuilding company
  - HD Hyundai Oilbank, a petroleum refinery company
  - HD Hyundai Electric, a smart energy sensations specialist company
- Hyundai Department Store Group, the retail division of the former conglomerate
  - Hyundai Department Store, a department store chain
- HDC Holdings, a conglomerate with emphasis on real estate development and financial services
  - Hyundai Development Company, a construction and civil engineering company
  - HDC Hyundai EP, a manufacturer of petrochemicals and plastics
- Hyundai Fomex, a professional lighting manufacturer
- Hyundai Marine & Fire Insurance, an insurance company
- Hyundai Corporation, a trading and industrial investment company
- Hyundai Power Products, a power equipment company owned and produced by Hyundai Corporation, and its importer and Distributor for UK and Ireland by Genpower
- Hyundai Appliances Africa, a TV and home appliances brand owned and produced by Hyundai Corporation, and is designed for the African appliance and TV market
- Hyundai Home Appliances, a TV and home appliance brand owned and produced by Hyundai Corporation, but the market is mostly in South Korea and the Philippines with other markets as a division
- Hyundai Electronics BD, an appliances company owned and produced by Hyundai Corporation, the appliances are designed for the market in Bangladesh
- Hyundai Electronics India, an appliance and TV company that is owned and produced by Hyundai Corporation, targeted toward the Indian market
- Hyundai Electronics Nepal, an electronics and home appliances company owned and produced by Hyundai Corporation, marketing targeted for Nepal, and it is also its own distributor
- Hyundai Technology USA, a tech brand that is owned and produced by Hyundai Corporation, the market is targeted for the US
- Hyundai Electronics, a chip manufacturer, spun off as Hynix in 2001 and renamed SK Hynix in 2012
