= 2017 FIFA U-20 World Cup =

2017 FIFA U-20 월드컵 대한민국

Tournament details
- Host country: South Korea
- Dates: 20 May – 11 June
- Teams: 24 (from 6 confederations)
- Venues: 6 (in 6 host cities)

Final positions
- Champions: England (1st title)
- Runners-up: Venezuela
- Third place: Italy
- Fourth place: Uruguay

Tournament statistics
- Matches played: 52
- Goals scored: 140 (2.69 per match)
- Attendance: 410,795 (7,900 per match)
- Top scorer(s): (Italy) Riccardo Orsolini (5 goals)
- Best player: (England) Dominic Solanke
- Best goalkeeper: (England) Freddie Woodman
- Fair play award: Mexico

The 2017 FIFA U-20 World Cup was the 21st edition of the FIFA U-20 World Cup, the biennial international men's youth football championship contested by the under-20 national teams of the member associations of FIFA, since its inception in 1977 as the FIFA World Youth Championship. The tournament was hosted by South Korea from 20 May to 11 June 2017.

Along with Japan and Mexico, South Korea became the third nation to have hosted all of FIFA men's international competitions, namely the 2002 FIFA World Cup, the 2001 FIFA Confederations Cup, and the 2007 FIFA U-17 World Cup.

The South Korean FA originally made a request to host the tournament outside the traditional June/July period, as it would clash with South Korea's rainy season, as well as any possible national team selection should they have qualified for the Confederations Cup.

Serbia, the 2015 champions, were not able to defend their title as they failed to reach the final round of the UEFA qualifying tournament. In doing so, they became the fifth consecutive incumbent title holder to fail to qualify for the subsequent tournament. The official match ball used in the tournament was Adidas Krasava.

England won their first U-20 World Cup title after beating Venezuela 1–0 in the final via a goal from Dominic Calvert-Lewin. This was the country's first world title since their men's senior side won the 1966 FIFA World Cup.

== Host selection ==
Along with asking member associations whether it wished to host the Under 20, Under 17 or the Beach Soccer World Cup in 2017 (along with Women's Tournaments a year previous), a declaration of interest would need to have been sent by 15 May 2013. A total of 12 countries submitted a bid to host the tournament by the May 2013 deadline:

- Azerbaijan
- Bahrain
- England (later withdrew)
- France
- Ireland
- Mexico
- Poland
- Saudi Arabia
- South Africa (later withdrew)
- South Korea
- Tunisia
- Ukraine

The final decision on who would be hosts were made as part of FIFA's Executive Committee meetings in Brazil on 5 December 2013 with Korea Republic being awarded the hosting rights.

== Qualified teams ==
A total of 24 teams qualified for the final tournament. In addition to South Korea who qualified automatically as hosts, the other 23 teams qualified from six separate continental competitions. Starting from 2017, the Oceania Football Confederation received an additional slot (in total two), while UEFA will have five instead of six slots.

Confederation	Qualifying Tournament	Qualifier(s)
AFC (Asia)	Host Nation	South Korea
AFC (Asia)	2016 AFC U-19 Championship	Iran; Japan; Saudi Arabia; Vietnam^{1}
CAF (Africa)	2017 Africa U-20 Cup of Nations	Guinea; Senegal; South Africa; Zambia
CONCACAF (Central, North America and Caribbean)	2017 CONCACAF U-20 Championship	Costa Rica; Honduras; Mexico; United States
CONMEBOL (South America)	2017 South American U-20 Championship	Argentina; Ecuador; Uruguay; Venezuela
OFC (Oceania)	2016 OFC U-20 Championship	New Zealand; Vanuatu^{1}
UEFA (Europe)	2016 UEFA European Under-19 Championship	England; France; Germany; Italy; Portugal

1. Teams that made their debut.

== Venues ==
Cheonan, Daejeon, Incheon, Seogwipo, Jeonju and Suwon were the six cities chosen to host the competition from a shortlist of nine, with Seoul, Pohang, and Ulsan not chosen.

Cheonan	Daejeon	Incheon
Cheonan Stadium (Cheonan Sports Complex)	Daejeon World Cup Stadium	Incheon Football Stadium (Incheon Stadium)
Capacity: 25,814	Capacity: 39,654	Capacity: 19,649
2017 FIFA U-20 World Cup is located in South Korea
Seogwipo	Jeonju	Suwon
Jeju World Cup Stadium	Jeonju World Cup Stadium	Suwon World Cup Stadium
Capacity: 29,346	Capacity: 41,785	Capacity: 42,655

== Preparation ==
As part of preparations for the U-20 World Cup, the 2016 Suwon JS Cup, an international football friendly tournament, was held to prepare the host organisers.

== Organization ==
The following were key milestones in the organization of the tournament:

- The match schedule was announced by FIFA on 23 November 2015.
- Former South Korean internationals Ahn Jung-hwan and Park Ji-sung were appointed as the ambassadors of the tournament.
- The official emblem, slogan ("Trigger the Fever") and look of the tournament were unveiled on 16 June 2016.
- The official mascot, Chaormi, a young tiger, was unveiled on 25 August 2016.
- Details of the volunteer programme, which was launched on 1 November 2016, was released on 18 October 2016.
- The official posters were released on 27 October 2016.
- Venue package tickets went on sale on 1 November 2016, while general ticket sales began on 2 January 2017. All-out ticket sales kicked off on 16 March 2017.
- NCT Dream were appointed as Local Organising Committee ambassadors, and were also chosen to sing the official song of the tournament: "Trigger the Fever".

== Draw ==
The draw was held on 15 March 2017, 15:00 KST (UTC+9), at the Suwon Atrium in Suwon, South Korea. Two Argentine players who have won the FIFA U-20 World Cup, Diego Maradona and Pablo Aimar, participated in the draw. Minho Choi from the South Korean idol group SHINee also participated in the draw.

The 24 teams were drawn into six groups of four teams, with hosts South Korea being automatically seeded into Pot 1 and assigned to the first position of group A. The rest of the teams were seeded into their respective pots based on their results in the last five FIFA U-20 World Cups (more recent tournaments weighted more heavily), and with five bonus points added to each of the 6 continental champions from the qualifying tournaments, as follows:

Pot	Team	Confederation	2007	2009	2011	2013	2015		
Pot	Team	Confederation	Points (20%)	Points (40%)	Points (60%)	Points (80%)	Points (100%)	Bonus (Note: Continental champions bonus points)	Total points
1	South Korea (H)	AFC	Host nation, automatically assigned to Pot 1						
1	Portugal	UEFA	0.6	DNQ	8.4	5.6	13		27.6
1	Uruguay	CONMEBOL	0.8	2.8	1.2	11.2	5	+5	26
1	France	UEFA	DNQ	DNQ	7.2	11.2	DNQ	+5	23.4
1	United States	CONCACAF	2	1.2	DNQ	0.8	10	+5	19
1	Germany	UEFA	DNQ	4	DNQ	DNQ	13		17
2	Mexico	CONCACAF	2.4	DNQ	6.6	2.4	3		14.4
2	Argentina	CONMEBOL	3.8	DNQ	6.6	DNQ	2		12.4
2	New Zealand	OFC	0	DNQ	1.2	0	4	+5	10.2
2	Senegal	CAF	DNQ	DNQ	DNQ	DNQ	8		8
2	Japan	AFC	1.6	DNQ	DNQ	DNQ	DNQ	+5	6.6
2	Costa Rica	CONCACAF	0.6	4	1.8	DNQ	DNQ		6.4
3	Zambia	CAF	0.8	DNQ	DNQ	DNQ	DNQ	+5	5.8
3	Honduras	CONCACAF	DNQ	1.2	DNQ	DNQ	3		4.2
3	England	UEFA	DNQ	0.4	1.8	1.6	DNQ		3.8
3	Saudi Arabia	AFC	DNQ	DNQ	3.6	DNQ	DNQ		3.6
3	Italy	UEFA	DNQ	2.8	DNQ	DNQ	DNQ		2.8
3	Venezuela	CONMEBOL	DNQ	2.4	DNQ	DNQ	DNQ		2.4
4	Ecuador	CONMEBOL	DNQ	DNQ	2.4	DNQ	DNQ		2.4
4	South Africa	CAF	DNQ	1.6	DNQ	DNQ	DNQ		1.6
4	Iran	AFC	DNQ	DNQ	DNQ	DNQ	DNQ		0
4	Vietnam	AFC	DNQ	DNQ	DNQ	DNQ	DNQ		0
4	Guinea	CAF	DNQ	DNQ	DNQ	DNQ	DNQ		0
4	Vanuatu	OFC	DNQ	DNQ	DNQ	DNQ	DNQ		0

The draw started with the hosts South Korea being "drawn" to A1. Teams from Pot 1 were drawn first, followed by Pot 2, Pot 3, and finally Pot 4, with each team also drawn to one of the positions within their group. Teams from the same confederation could not be drawn against each other for the group stage.

The draw resulted in the following groups:

Group A
Pos	Team
A1	South Korea
A2	Guinea
A3	Argentina
A4	England

Group B
Pos	Team
B1	Venezuela
B2	Germany
B3	Vanuatu
B4	Mexico

Group C
Pos	Team
C1	Zambia
C2	Portugal
C3	Iran
C4	Costa Rica

Group D
Pos	Team
D1	South Africa
D2	Japan
D3	Italy
D4	Uruguay

Group E
Pos	Team
E1	France
E2	Honduras
E3	Vietnam
E4	New Zealand

Group F
Pos	Team
F1	Ecuador
F2	United States
F3	Saudi Arabia
F4	Senegal

== Match officials ==
A total of 22 refereeing trios (a referee and two assistant referees), 5 support referees and 21 video assistant referees were appointed for the tournament. This was the first FIFA underage tournament which uses the video assistant referee.

Confederation	Referee	Assistant referees	Support referee	Video assistant referees
AFC	(Qatar) Abdulrahman Al-Jassim	(Qatar) Taleb Al-Marri (Qatar) Saud Al-Maqaleh	(Oman) Ahmed Al-Kaf	(Singapore) Muhammad Taqi Aljaafari (Japan) Ryuji Sato (Bahrain) Nawaf Shukralla
AFC	(United Arab Emirates) Abdulla Hassan Mohamed	(United Arab Emirates) Mohamed Al-Hammadi (United Arab Emirates) Hasan Al-Mahri	(Oman) Ahmed Al-Kaf	(Singapore) Muhammad Taqi Aljaafari (Japan) Ryuji Sato (Bahrain) Nawaf Shukralla
AFC	(South Korea) Kim Jong-hyeok	(South Korea) Yoon Kwang-yeol (South Korea) Kim Young-ha	(Oman) Ahmed Al-Kaf	(Singapore) Muhammad Taqi Aljaafari (Japan) Ryuji Sato (Bahrain) Nawaf Shukralla
CAF	(Cameroon) Sidi Alioum	(Cameroon) Evarist Menkouande (Cameroon) Elvis Noupue	(Ethiopia) Bamlak Tessema Weyesa	(Algeria) Mehdi Abid Charef (Senegal) Malang Diedhiou (Gabon) Eric Otogo-Castane
CAF	(Egypt) Gehad Grisha	(Morocco) Redouane Achik (Sudan) Waleed Ahmed	(Ethiopia) Bamlak Tessema Weyesa	(Algeria) Mehdi Abid Charef (Senegal) Malang Diedhiou (Gabon) Eric Otogo-Castane
CAF	(Zambia) Janny Sikazwe	(Angola) Jerson dos Santos (South Africa) Zakhele Siwela	(Ethiopia) Bamlak Tessema Weyesa	(Algeria) Mehdi Abid Charef (Senegal) Malang Diedhiou (Gabon) Eric Otogo-Castane
CONCACAF	(El Salvador) Joel Aguilar	(El Salvador) Juan Zumba (El Salvador) William Torres	(Cuba) Yadel Martínez	(Mexico) Roberto García (Costa Rica) Ricardo Montero (Panama) John Pitti
CONCACAF	(Guatemala) Walter López	(Guatemala) Gerson López (Guatemala) Hermenerito Leal	(Cuba) Yadel Martínez	(Mexico) Roberto García (Costa Rica) Ricardo Montero (Panama) John Pitti
CONCACAF	(Mexico) César Ramos	(Mexico) Marvin Torrentera (Mexico) Miguel Hernández	(Cuba) Yadel Martínez	(Mexico) Roberto García (Costa Rica) Ricardo Montero (Panama) John Pitti
CONMEBOL	(Chile) Julio Bascuñán	(Chile) Carlos Astroza (Chile) Christian Schiemann	(Paraguay) Mario Díaz de Vivar	(Venezuela) José Argote (Brazil) Wilton Sampaio (Bolivia) Gery Vargas (Argentina) Mauro Vigliano
CONMEBOL	(Uruguay) Andrés Cunha	(Uruguay) Nicolás Taran (Uruguay) Mauricio Espinosa	(Paraguay) Mario Díaz de Vivar	(Venezuela) José Argote (Brazil) Wilton Sampaio (Bolivia) Gery Vargas (Argentina) Mauro Vigliano
CONMEBOL	(Peru) Diego Haro	(Peru) Jonny Bossio (Peru) Raúl López	(Paraguay) Mario Díaz de Vivar	(Venezuela) José Argote (Brazil) Wilton Sampaio (Bolivia) Gery Vargas (Argentina) Mauro Vigliano
CONMEBOL	(Ecuador) Roddy Zambrano	(Ecuador) Christian Lescano (Ecuador) Byron Romero	(Paraguay) Mario Díaz de Vivar	(Venezuela) José Argote (Brazil) Wilton Sampaio (Bolivia) Gery Vargas (Argentina) Mauro Vigliano
OFC	(New Zealand) Matt Conger	(New Zealand) Simon Lount (Tonga) Tevita Makasini	—	(New Zealand) Nick Waldron
OFC	(French Polynesia) Norbert Hauata	(French Polynesia) Philippe Revel (New Caledonia) Bertrand Brial	—	(New Zealand) Nick Waldron
UEFA	(Turkey) Cüneyt Çakır	(Turkey) Bahattin Duran (Turkey) Tarık Ongun	(Slovakia) Ivan Kružliak	(Scotland) William Collum (Czech Republic) Pavel Královec (Netherlands) Danny Makkelie (Norway) Svein Oddvar Moen (Italy) Daniele Orsato (Greece) Anastasios Sidiropoulos (Germany) Felix Zwayer
UEFA	(Sweden) Jonas Eriksson	(Sweden) Mathias Klasenius (Sweden) Daniel Wärnmark	(Slovakia) Ivan Kružliak	(Scotland) William Collum (Czech Republic) Pavel Královec (Netherlands) Danny Makkelie (Norway) Svein Oddvar Moen (Italy) Daniele Orsato (Greece) Anastasios Sidiropoulos (Germany) Felix Zwayer
UEFA	(Russia) Sergei Karasev	(Russia) Anton Averyanov (Russia) Tikhon Kalugin	(Slovakia) Ivan Kružliak	(Scotland) William Collum (Czech Republic) Pavel Královec (Netherlands) Danny Makkelie (Norway) Svein Oddvar Moen (Italy) Daniele Orsato (Greece) Anastasios Sidiropoulos (Germany) Felix Zwayer
UEFA	(Hungary) Viktor Kassai	(Hungary) György Ring (Hungary) Vencel Tóth	(Slovakia) Ivan Kružliak	(Scotland) William Collum (Czech Republic) Pavel Královec (Netherlands) Danny Makkelie (Norway) Svein Oddvar Moen (Italy) Daniele Orsato (Greece) Anastasios Sidiropoulos (Germany) Felix Zwayer
UEFA	(Netherlands) Björn Kuipers	(Netherlands) Sander van Roekel (Netherlands) Erwin Zeinstra	(Slovakia) Ivan Kružliak	(Scotland) William Collum (Czech Republic) Pavel Královec (Netherlands) Danny Makkelie (Norway) Svein Oddvar Moen (Italy) Daniele Orsato (Greece) Anastasios Sidiropoulos (Germany) Felix Zwayer
UEFA	(Poland) Szymon Marciniak	(Poland) Paweł Sokolnicki (Poland) Tomasz Listkiewicz	(Slovakia) Ivan Kružliak	(Scotland) William Collum (Czech Republic) Pavel Královec (Netherlands) Danny Makkelie (Norway) Svein Oddvar Moen (Italy) Daniele Orsato (Greece) Anastasios Sidiropoulos (Germany) Felix Zwayer
UEFA	(Spain) Antonio Mateu Lahoz	(Spain) Pau Cebrián Devis (Spain) Roberto Díaz Pérez	(Slovakia) Ivan Kružliak	(Scotland) William Collum (Czech Republic) Pavel Královec (Netherlands) Danny Makkelie (Norway) Svein Oddvar Moen (Italy) Daniele Orsato (Greece) Anastasios Sidiropoulos (Germany) Felix Zwayer

== Squads ==
Each team had to name a preliminary squad of 35 players. From the preliminary squad, the team had to name a final squad of 21 players (three of whom must be goalkeepers) by the FIFA deadline. Players in the final squad could be replaced due to serious injury up to 24 hours prior to kickoff of the team's first match. The squads were announced by FIFA on 11 May 2017.

== Group stage ==
The top two teams of each group and the four best third-placed teams advanced to the round of 16.

All times are local, KST (UTC+9).

=== Tiebreakers ===
The rankings of teams in each group were determined as follows (regulations Article 17.7):

1. points obtained in all group matches;
2. goal difference in all group matches;
3. number of goals scored in all group matches;

If two or more teams were equal on the basis of the above three criteria, their rankings were determined by:

4. points obtained in the group matches between the teams concerned;
5. goal difference in the group matches between the teams concerned;
6. number of goals scored in the group matches between the teams concerned;
7. fair play points:
  - first yellow card: minus 1 point;
  - indirect red card (second yellow card): minus 3 points;
  - direct red card: minus 4 points;
  - yellow card and direct red card: minus 5 points;
8. drawing of lots by the FIFA Organising Committee.

=== Group A ===
Pos	Team	Pld	W	D	L	GF	GA	GD	Pts	Qualification
1	England	3	2	1	0	5	1	+4	7	Knockout stage
2	South Korea (H)	3	2	0	1	5	2	+3	6	Knockout stage
3	Argentina	3	1	0	2	6	5	+1	3	
4	Guinea	3	0	1	2	1	9	−8	1	

Source: FIFA
Rules for classification: Group stage tiebreakers
(H) Hosts
20 May 2017
16:30

Argentina	0–3	England
	Report	Calvert-Lewin 38'; Armstrong 52'; Solanke 90+3' (pen.)

Jeonju World Cup Stadium, Jeonju
Attendance: 15,510
Referee: Abdulla Hassan Mohamed (United Arab Emirates)
20 May 2017
20:00

South Korea	3–0	Guinea
Lee Seung-woo 36'; Lim Min-hyeok 76'; Paik Seung-ho 81'	Report

Jeonju World Cup Stadium, Jeonju
Attendance: 37,500
Referee: Julio Bascuñán (Chile)

23 May 2017
17:00

England	1–1	Guinea
Cook 53'	Report	Tomori 59' (o.g.)

Jeonju World Cup Stadium, Jeonju
Attendance: 5,992
Referee: Joel Aguilar (El Salvador)
23 May 2017
20:00

South Korea	2–1	Argentina
Lee Seung-woo 18'; Paik Seung-ho 42' (pen.)	Report	Torres 50'

Jeonju World Cup Stadium, Jeonju
Attendance: 27,058
Referee: Cüneyt Çakır (Turkey)

26 May 2017
20:00

England	1–0	South Korea
Dowell 56'	Report

Suwon World Cup Stadium, Suwon
Attendance: 35,279
Referee: César Ramos (Mexico)
26 May 2017
20:00

Guinea	0–5	Argentina
	Report	Torres 33'; La. Martínez 43', 79'; Zaracho 50'; Senesi 74'

Jeju World Cup Stadium, Seogwipo
Attendance: 4,545
Referee: Viktor Kassai (Hungary)

=== Group B ===
Pos	Team	Pld	W	D	L	GF	GA	GD	Pts	Qualification
1	Venezuela	3	3	0	0	10	0	+10	9	Knockout stage
2	Mexico	3	1	1	1	3	3	0	4	Knockout stage
3	Germany	3	1	1	1	3	4	−1	4	Knockout stage
4	Vanuatu	3	0	0	3	4	13	−9	0	

Source: FIFA
Rules for classification: Group stage tiebreakers
20 May 2017
14:00

Venezuela	2–0	Germany
Peña 51'; Córdova 54'	Report

Daejeon World Cup Stadium, Daejeon
Attendance: 5,049
Referee: Ghead Grisha (Egypt)
20 May 2017
17:00

Vanuatu	2–3	Mexico
Kalo 52'; Wilkins 62'	Report	Magaña 10'; Cisneros 25'; Álvarez 90+4'

Daejeon World Cup Stadium, Daejeon
Attendance: 6,251
Referee: Sergei Karasev (Russia)

23 May 2017
17:00

Venezuela	7–0	Vanuatu
Velásquez 30'; Córdova 42', 73'; Peñaranda 46'; Faríñez 56' (pen.); Hurtado 82'; Sosa 89'	Report

Daejeon World Cup Stadium, Daejeon
Attendance: 1,495
Referee: Kim Jong-hyeok (South Korea)
23 May 2017
20:00

Mexico	0–0	Germany
	Report

Daejeon World Cup Stadium, Daejeon
Attendance: 4,388
Referee: Janny Sikazwe (Zambia)

26 May 2017
17:00

Mexico	0–1	Venezuela
	Report	Córdova 33'

Suwon World Cup Stadium, Suwon
Attendance: 5,040
Referee: Jonas Eriksson (Sweden)
26 May 2017
17:00

Germany	3–2	Vanuatu
Badu 27'; Reese 32'; Iyoha 50'	Report	Kalo 52', 77'

Jeju World Cup Stadium, Seogwipo
Attendance: 3,175
Referee: Walter López (Guatemala)

=== Group C ===
Pos	Team	Pld	W	D	L	GF	GA	GD	Pts	Qualification
1	Zambia	3	2	0	1	6	4	+2	6	Knockout stage
2	Portugal	3	1	1	1	4	4	0	4	Knockout stage
3	Costa Rica	3	1	1	1	2	2	0	4	Knockout stage
4	Iran	3	1	0	2	4	6	−2	3	

Source: FIFA
Rules for classification: Group stage tiebreakers
21 May 2017
14:00

Zambia	2–1	Portugal
Chilufya 51'; F. Sakala 76'	Report	Hélder 90+1'

Jeju World Cup Stadium, Seogwipo
Attendance: 4,356
Referee: César Ramos (Mexico)
21 May 2017
17:00

Iran	1–0	Costa Rica
Mehdikhani 81'	Report

Jeju World Cup Stadium, Seogwipo
Attendance: 4,896
Referee: Jonas Eriksson (Sweden)

24 May 2017
17:00

Zambia	4–2	Iran
F. Sakala 54'; Mwepu 59'; E. Banda 65'; Daka 71'	Report	Shekari 7', 49' (pen.)

Jeju World Cup Stadium, Seogwipo
Attendance: 2,060
Referee: Antonio Mateu Lahoz (Spain)
24 May 2017
20:00

Costa Rica	1–1	Portugal
Marín 48' (pen.)	Report	Gonçalves 32' (pen.)

Jeju World Cup Stadium, Seogwipo
Attendance: 3,147
Referee: Abdulrahman Al-Jassim (Qatar)

27 May 2017
17:00

Costa Rica	1–0	Zambia
Daly 15'	Report

Cheonan Sports Complex, Cheonan
Attendance: 4,508
Referee: Matthew Conger (New Zealand)
27 May 2017
17:00

Portugal	2–1	Iran
Gonçalves 54'; Taheri 86' (o.g.)	Report	Shekari 4'

Incheon Stadium, Incheon
Attendance: 6,085
Referee: Roddy Zambrano (Ecuador)

=== Group D ===
Pos	Team	Pld	W	D	L	GF	GA	GD	Pts	Qualification
1	Uruguay	3	2	1	0	3	0	+3	7	Knockout stage
2	Italy	3	1	1	1	4	3	+1	4	Knockout stage
3	Japan	3	1	1	1	4	5	−1	4	Knockout stage
4	South Africa	3	0	1	2	1	4	−3	1	

Source: FIFA
Rules for classification: Group stage tiebreakers
21 May 2017
17:00

South Africa	1–2	Japan
Tomiyasu 7' (o.g.)	Report	Ogawa 48'; Dōan 72'

Suwon World Cup Stadium, Suwon
Attendance: 8,091
Referee: Matt Conger (New Zealand)
21 May 2017
20:00

Italy	0–1	Uruguay
	Report	Amaral 76'

Suwon World Cup Stadium, Suwon
Attendance: 9,128
Referee: Walter López (Guatemala)

24 May 2017
17:00

South Africa	0–2	Italy
	Report	Orsolini 23' (pen.); Favilli 57'

Suwon World Cup Stadium, Suwon
Attendance: 5,931
Referee: Roddy Zambrano (Ecuador)
24 May 2017
20:00

Uruguay	2–0	Japan
Schiappacasse 38'; Olivera 90+1'	Report

Suwon World Cup Stadium, Suwon
Attendance: 7,978
Referee: Szymon Marciniak (Poland)

27 May 2017
20:00

Uruguay	0–0	South Africa
	Report

Incheon Stadium, Incheon
Attendance: 7,707
Referee: Sergei Karasev (Russia)
27 May 2017
20:00

Japan	2–2	Italy
Dōan 22', 50'	Report	Orsolini 3'; Panico 7'

Cheonan Sports Complex, Cheonan
Attendance: 10,003
Referee: Ghead Grisha (Egypt)

=== Group E ===
Pos	Team	Pld	W	D	L	GF	GA	GD	Pts	Qualification
1	France	3	3	0	0	9	0	+9	9	Knockout stage
2	New Zealand	3	1	1	1	3	3	0	4	Knockout stage
3	Honduras	3	1	0	2	3	6	−3	3	
4	Vietnam	3	0	1	2	0	6	−6	1	

Source: FIFA
Rules for classification: Group stage tiebreakers
22 May 2017
17:00

France	3–0	Honduras
Augustin 15'; Harit 44'; Terrier 81'	Report

Cheonan Sports Complex, Cheonan
Attendance: 2,947
Referee: Andrés Cunha (Uruguay)
22 May 2017
20:00

Vietnam	0–0	New Zealand
	Report

Cheonan Sports Complex, Cheonan
Attendance: 6,975
Referee: Sidi Alioum (Cameroon)

25 May 2017
17:00

France	4–0	Vietnam
Thuram 18'; Augustin 22', 45'; Poha 52'	Report

Cheonan Sports Complex, Cheonan
Attendance: 4,672
Referee: Norbert Hauata (Tahiti)
25 May 2017
20:00

New Zealand	3–1	Honduras
Bevan 1', 56' (pen.); Ashworth 23'	Report	Álvarez 50'

Cheonan Sports Complex, Cheonan
Attendance: 6,074
Referee: Diego Haro (Peru)

28 May 2017
15:00

New Zealand	0–2	France
	Report	Saint-Maximin 22', 37'

Daejeon World Cup Stadium, Daejeon
Attendance: 4,280
Referee: Kim Jong-hyeok (South Korea)
28 May 2017
15:00

Honduras	2–0	Vietnam
Cruz 76'; Álvarez 90+3'	Report

Jeonju World Cup Stadium, Jeonju
Attendance: 10,427
Referee: Abdulla Hassan Mohamed (United Arab Emirates)

=== Group F ===
Pos	Team	Pld	W	D	L	GF	GA	GD	Pts	Qualification
1	United States	3	1	2	0	5	4	+1	5	Knockout stage
2	Senegal	3	1	1	1	2	1	+1	4	Knockout stage
3	Saudi Arabia	3	1	1	1	3	4	−1	4	Knockout stage
4	Ecuador	3	0	2	1	4	5	−1	2	

Source: FIFA
Rules for classification: Group stage tiebreakers
22 May 2017
17:00

Ecuador	3–3	United States
Lino 5'; Cabezas 7', 64'	Report	Sargent 36', 54'; De la Torre 90+4'

Incheon Stadium, Incheon
Attendance: 3,886
Referee: Björn Kuipers (Netherlands)
22 May 2017
20:00

Saudi Arabia	0–2	Senegal
	Report	Niane 13'; Diagne 15'

Incheon Stadium, Incheon
Attendance: 5,110
Referee: Viktor Kassai (Hungary)

25 May 2017
17:00

Ecuador	1–2	Saudi Arabia
Caicedo 89'	Report	Al-Yami 7', 84'

Incheon Stadium, Incheon
Attendance: 3,496
Referee: Sidi Alioum (Cameroon)
25 May 2017
20:00

Senegal	0–1	United States
	Report	Sargent 34'

Incheon Stadium, Incheon
Attendance: 5,864
Referee: Andrés Cunha (Uruguay)

28 May 2017
18:00

Senegal	0–0	Ecuador
	Report

Jeonju World Cup Stadium, Jeonju
Attendance: 11,047
Referee: Antonio Mateu Lahoz (Spain)
28 May 2017
18:00

United States	1–1	Saudi Arabia
Lennon 40'	Report	Al-Amri 74'

Daejeon World Cup Stadium, Daejeon
Attendance: 5,460
Referee: Diego Haro (Peru)

=== Ranking of third-placed teams ===
The four best teams among those ranked third are determined as follows (regulations Article 17.8):

1. points obtained in all group matches;
2. goal difference in all group matches;
3. number of goals scored in all group matches;
4. fair play points;
5. drawing of lots by the FIFA Organizing Committee.

Pos	Grp	Team	Pld	W	D	L	GF	GA	GD	Pts	Qualification
1	C	Costa Rica	3	1	1	1	2	2	0	4	Advance to knockout stage
2	D	Japan	3	1	1	1	4	5	−1	4	Advance to knockout stage
3	B	Germany	3	1	1	1	3	4	−1	4 (Note: Fair play points: Germany –8, Saudi Arabia –9.)	Advance to knockout stage
4	F	Saudi Arabia	3	1	1	1	3	4	−1	4	Advance to knockout stage
5	A	Argentina	3	1	0	2	6	5	+1	3	
6	E	Honduras	3	1	0	2	3	6	−3	3	

Source: FIFA
Rules for classification: 1) Points; 2) Goal difference; 3) Goals scored; 4) Fair play points; 5) Drawing of lots.

== Knockout stage ==
In the knockout stage, if a match was level at the end of normal playing time, extra time was played (two periods of 15 minutes each) and followed, if necessary, by a penalty shoot-out to determine the winner. However, for the third place match, no extra time was played and the winner was determined by kicks from the penalty mark.

In the round of 16, the four third-placed teams were matched with the winners of groups A, B, C, and D. The specific match-ups involving the third-placed teams depend on which four third-placed teams qualified for the round of 16:

Third-placed teams qualify from groups						1A vs	1B vs	1C vs	1D vs
A	B	C	D			3C	3D	3A	3B
A	B	C		E		3C	3A	3B	3E
A	B	C			F	3C	3A	3B	3F
A	B		D	E		3D	3A	3B	3E
A	B		D		F	3D	3A	3B	3F
A	B			E	F	3E	3A	3B	3F
A		C	D	E		3C	3D	3A	3E
A		C	D		F	3C	3D	3A	3F
A		C		E	F	3C	3A	3F	3E
A			D	E	F	3D	3A	3F	3E
	B	C	D	E		3C	3D	3B	3E
	B	C	D		F	3C	3D	3B	3F
	B	C		E	F	3E	3C	3B	3F
	B		D	E	F	3E	3D	3B	3F
		C	D	E	F	3C	3D	3F	3E

=== Bracket ===
Round of 16
30 May — Cheonan
South Korea	1
Portugal	3
31 May — Suwon
Uruguay	1
Saudi Arabia	0
30 May — Daejeon
Venezuela (a.e.t.)	1
Japan	0
1 June — Incheon
United States	6
New Zealand	0
1 June — Cheonan
France	1
Italy	2
31 May — Seogwipo
Zambia (a.e.t.)	4
Germany	3
1 June — Incheon
Mexico	1
Senegal	0
31 May — Jeonju
England	2
Costa Rica	1

Quarter-finals
4 June — Daejeon
Portugal	2 (4)
Uruguay (p)	2 (5)
4 June — Jeonju
Venezuela (a.e.t.)	2
United States	1
5 June — Suwon
Italy (a.e.t.)	3
Zambia	2
5 June — Cheonan
Mexico	0
England	1

Semi-finals
8 June — Daejeon
Uruguay	1 (3)
Venezuela (p)	1 (4)
8 June — Jeonju
Italy	1
England	3

Final
11 June — Suwon
Venezuela	0
England	1
Third place play-off
11 June — Suwon
Uruguay	0 (1)
Italy (p)	0 (4)

=== Round of 16 ===
30 May 2017
17:00

Venezuela	1–0 (a.e.t.)	Japan
Herrera 108'	Report

Daejeon World Cup Stadium, Daejeon
Attendance: 2,013
Referee: Björn Kuipers (Netherlands)

30 May 2017
20:00

South Korea	1–3	Portugal
Lee Sang-heon 81'	Report	Xadas 10', 69'; Bruno Costa 27'

Cheonan Sports Complex, Cheonan
Attendance: 21,361
Referee: Andrés Cunha (Uruguay)

31 May 2017
17:00

Uruguay	1–0	Saudi Arabia
De La Cruz 50' (pen.)	Report

Suwon World Cup Stadium, Suwon
Attendance: 2,522
Referee: Janny Sikazwe (Zambia)

31 May 2017
20:00

England	2–1	Costa Rica
Lookman 35', 63'	Report	Leal 89'

Jeonju World Cup Stadium, Jeonju
Attendance: 4,428
Referee: Julio Bascuñán (Chile)

31 May 2017
20:00

Zambia	4–3 (a.e.t.)	Germany
E. Banda 50'; F. Sakala 68'; Mwepu 86'; Mayembe 107'	Report	Ochs 37'; Serdar 89'; Arweiler 90+4'

Jeju World Cup Stadium, Seogwipo
Attendance: 2,925
Referee: Joel Aguilar (El Salvador)

1 June 2017
16:30

Mexico	1–0	Senegal
Cisneros 89'	Report

Incheon Stadium, Incheon
Attendance: 3,276
Referee: Cüneyt Çakır (Turkey)

1 June 2017
20:00

France	1–2	Italy
Augustin 37' (pen.)	Report	Orsolini 27'; Panico 53'

Cheonan Sports Complex, Cheonan
Attendance: 3,321
Referee: Szymon Marciniak (Poland)

1 June 2017
20:00

United States	6–0	New Zealand
Sargent 32'; Ebobisse 64'; Lennon 65'; Glad 76'; Trusty 84'; Kunga 90+3'	Report

Incheon Stadium, Incheon
Attendance: 5,667
Referee: Abdulrahman Al-Jassim (Qatar)

=== Quarter-finals ===
4 June 2017
15:00

Venezuela	2–1 (a.e.t.)	United States
Peñaranda 96'; Ferraresi 115'	Report	Ebobisse 117'

Jeonju World Cup Stadium, Jeonju
Attendance: 2,671
Referee: Jonas Eriksson (Sweden)

4 June 2017
18:00

Portugal	2–2 (a.e.t.)	Uruguay
Silva 1'; Gonçalves 41'	Report	Bueno 16'; Valverde 50' (pen.)
Penalties
R. Dias (penalty scored); Dalot (penalty scored); Xadas (penalty scored); Gedson (penalty scored); Pêpê (penalty missed); Gomes (penalty missed); A. Ribeiro (penalty missed)	4–5	(penalty scored) Valverde; (penalty scored) Rodríguez; (penalty scored) Canobbio; (penalty scored) Ardaiz; (penalty missed) Amaral; (penalty missed) Viña; (penalty scored) Bueno

Daejeon World Cup Stadium, Daejeon
Attendance: 5,086
Referee: César Ramos (Mexico)

5 June 2017
17:00

Italy	3–2 (a.e.t.)	Zambia
Orsolini 50'; Dimarco 88'; Vido 111'	Report	Daka 4'; Sakala 84'

Suwon World Cup Stadium, Suwon
Attendance: 6,252
Referee: Roddy Zambrano (Ecuador)

5 June 2017
20:00

Mexico	0–1	England
	Report	Solanke 47'

Cheonan Sports Complex, Cheonan
Attendance: 5,953
Referee: Abdulla Hassan Mohamed (United Arab Emirates)

=== Semi-finals ===
8 June 2017
17:00

Uruguay	1–1 (a.e.t.)	Venezuela
De La Cruz 49' (pen.)	Report	Sosa 90+1'
Penalties
Valverde (penalty scored); Rodríguez (penalty missed); Canobbio (penalty scored); Bentancur (penalty scored); De La Cruz (penalty missed)	3–4	(penalty scored) Peñaranda; (penalty scored) Sosa; (penalty scored) R. Hernández; (penalty missed) Soteldo; (penalty scored) Herrera

Daejeon World Cup Stadium, Daejeon
Attendance: 3,486
Referee: Szymon Marciniak (Poland)

8 June 2017
20:00

Italy	1–3	England
Orsolini 2'	Report	Solanke 66', 88'; Lookman 77'

Jeonju World Cup Stadium, Jeonju
Attendance: 5,329
Referee: Antonio Mateu Lahoz (Spain)

=== Third place play-off ===
11 June 2017
15:30

Uruguay	0–0	Italy
	Report
Penalties
Valverde (penalty scored); Amaral (penalty missed); Boselli (penalty missed)	1–4	(penalty scored) Vido; (penalty scored) Marchizza; (penalty scored) Mandragora; (penalty scored) Panico

Suwon World Cup Stadium, Suwon
Attendance: 10,749
Referee: César Ramos (Mexico)

=== Final ===
This was the first ever final for both England and Venezuela in the history of the tournament, in their 11th and 2nd appearances respectively. England's previous best result was in 1993 when they finished third, while Venezuela were eliminated in the round of 16 in 2009. This was England's first appearance and victory in the final of a global football tournament since their senior side's 1966 FIFA World Cup victory, ending 51 years of waiting for a global tournament trophy.

11 June 2017
20:00

Venezuela	0–1	England
	Report	Calvert-Lewin 35'

Suwon World Cup Stadium, Suwon
Attendance: 30,346
Referee: Björn Kuipers (Netherlands)

== Awards ==
The following awards were given at the conclusion of the tournament. They were all sponsored by Adidas, except for the FIFA Fair Play Award and Goal of the Tournament.

Golden Ball	Silver Ball	Bronze Ball
(England) Dominic Solanke	(Uruguay) Federico Valverde	(Venezuela) Yangel Herrera
Golden Boot	Silver Boot	Bronze Boot
(Italy) Riccardo Orsolini (5 goals, 0 assists)	(United States) Josh Sargent (4 goals, 1 assist)	(France) Jean-Kévin Augustin (4 goals, 0 assists)
Golden Glove
(England) Freddie Woodman
FIFA Fair Play Award
Mexico
Goal of the Tournament
(Venezuela) Sergio Córdova

== Goalscorers ==
With five goals, Riccardo Orsolini is the top scorers in the tournament. In total, 140 goals were scored by 90 different players, with three of them credited as own goals.

5 goals

- (Italy) Riccardo Orsolini

4 goals

- (England) Dominic Solanke
- (France) Jean-Kévin Augustin
- (United States) Josh Sargent
- (Venezuela) Sergio Córdova
- (Zambia) Fashion Sakala

3 goals

- (England) Ademola Lookman
- (Iran) Reza Shekari
- (Japan) Ritsu Dōan
- (Portugal) Diogo Gonçalves
- (Vanuatu) Bong Kalo

2 goals

- (Argentina) Lautaro Martínez
- (Argentina) Marcelo Torres
- (Ecuador) Bryan Cabezas
- (England) Dominic Calvert-Lewin
- (France) Allan Saint-Maximin
- (Honduras) Jorge Álvarez
- (Italy) Giuseppe Panico
- (South Korea) Lee Seung-woo
- (South Korea) Paik Seung-ho
- (Mexico) Ronaldo Cisneros
- (New Zealand) Myer Bevan
- (Portugal) Xadas
- (Saudi Arabia) Abdulrahman Al-Yami
- (United States) Jeremy Ebobisse
- (United States) Brooks Lennon
- (Uruguay) Nicolás De La Cruz
- (Venezuela) Adalberto Peñaranda
- (Venezuela) Samuel Sosa
- (Zambia) Emmanuel Banda
- (Zambia) Patson Daka
- (Zambia) Enock Mwepu

1 goal

- (Argentina) Marcos Senesi
- (Argentina) Matías Zaracho
- (Costa Rica) Jostin Daly
- (Costa Rica) Randall Leal
- (Costa Rica) Jimmy Marín
- (Ecuador) Jordy Caicedo
- (Ecuador) Hernan Lino
- (England) Adam Armstrong
- (England) Lewis Cook
- (England) Kieran Dowell
- (France) Amine Harit
- (France) Denis-Will Poha
- (France) Martin Terrier
- (France) Marcus Thuram
- (Germany) Jonas Arweiler
- (Germany) Kentu Malcolm Badu
- (Germany) Emmanuel Iyoha
- (Germany) Philipp Ochs
- (Germany) Fabian Reese
- (Germany) Suat Serdar
- (Honduras) Sendel Cruz
- (Iran) Mehdi Mehdikhani
- (Italy) Federico Dimarco
- (Italy) Andrea Favilli
- (Italy) Luca Vido
- (Japan) Koki Ogawa
- (South Korea) Lim Min-hyeok
- (South Korea) Lee Sang-heon
- (Mexico) Edson Álvarez
- (Mexico) Kevin Magaña
- (New Zealand) Hunter Ashworth
- (Portugal) Bruno Costa
- (Portugal) Hélder Ferreira
- (Portugal) Xande Silva
- (Saudi Arabia) Abdulelah Al-Amri
- (Senegal) Ousseynou Diagne
- (Senegal) Ibrahima Niane
- (United States) Luca de la Torre
- (United States) Justen Glad
- (United States) Lagos Kunga
- (United States) Auston Trusty
- (Uruguay) Rodrigo Amaral
- (Uruguay) Santiago Bueno
- (Uruguay) Mathías Olivera
- (Uruguay) Nicolás Schiappacasse
- (Uruguay) Federico Valverde
- (Vanuatu) Ronaldo Wilkins
- (Venezuela) Nahuel Ferraresi
- (Venezuela) Yangel Herrera
- (Venezuela) Wuilker Faríñez
- (Venezuela) Jan Carlos Hurtado
- (Venezuela) Ronaldo Peña
- (Venezuela) Williams Velásquez
- (Zambia) Edward Chilufya
- (Zambia) Shemmy Mayembe

1 own goal

- (England) Fikayo Tomori (playing against Guinea)
- (Iran) Nima Taheri (playing against Portugal)
- (Japan) Takehiro Tomiyasu (playing against South Africa)

Source: FIFA

== Final ranking ==
As per statistical convention in football, matches decided in extra time are counted as wins and losses, while matches decided by penalty shoot-outs are counted as draws.

Pos	Team	Pld	W	D	L	GF	GA	GD	Pts	Final result
1	England	7	6	1	0	12	3	+9	19	Champions
2	Venezuela	7	5	1	1	14	3	+11	16	Runners-up
3	Italy	7	3	2	2	10	9	+1	11	Third place
4	Uruguay	7	3	4	0	7	3	+4	13	Fourth place
5	Zambia	5	3	0	2	12	10	+2	9	Eliminated in Quarter-finals
6	United States	5	2	2	1	12	6	+6	8	Eliminated in Quarter-finals
7	Portugal	5	2	2	1	9	7	+2	8	Eliminated in Quarter-finals
8	Mexico	5	2	1	2	4	4	0	7	Eliminated in Quarter-finals
9	France	4	3	0	1	10	2	+8	9	Eliminated in Round of 16
10	South Korea (H)	4	2	0	2	6	5	+1	6	Eliminated in Round of 16
11	Senegal	4	1	1	2	2	2	0	4	Eliminated in Round of 16
12	Costa Rica	4	1	1	2	3	4	−1	4	Eliminated in Round of 16
13	Germany	4	1	1	2	6	8	−2	4	Eliminated in Round of 16
14	Japan	4	1	1	2	4	6	−2	4	Eliminated in Round of 16
15	Saudi Arabia	4	1	1	2	3	5	−2	4	Eliminated in Round of 16
16	New Zealand	4	1	1	2	3	9	−6	4	Eliminated in Round of 16
17	Argentina	3	1	0	2	6	5	+1	3	Eliminated in Group stage
18	Iran	3	1	0	2	4	6	−2	3	Eliminated in Group stage
19	Honduras	3	1	0	2	3	6	−3	3	Eliminated in Group stage
20	Ecuador	3	0	2	1	4	5	−1	2	Eliminated in Group stage
21	South Africa	3	0	1	2	1	4	−3	1	Eliminated in Group stage
22	Vietnam	3	0	1	2	0	6	−6	1	Eliminated in Group stage
23	Guinea	3	0	1	2	1	9	−8	1	Eliminated in Group stage
24	Vanuatu	3	0	0	3	4	13	−9	0	Eliminated in Group stage

Source: Techn. Report p. 6
(H) Hosts

== Marketing ==
=== Sponsorship ===
FIFA partners	National Supporters
Adidas; Coca-Cola; Gazprom; Hyundai; Qatar Airways; Visa; Wanda Group	HDC Hyundai EP; Hyundai Marine & Fire Insurance; KEB Hana Bank; KT Corporation; Naver; Samsung Electronics

== Broadcasters rights ==
The following companies held the broadcasters rights:

- South Korea: KBS, MBC, SBS
- Argentina: TyC Sports
- Brazil: SporTV, Rede Bandeirantes
- Canada: TSN, RDS
- India: Sony Six (Only match between South Korea and Guinea)
- Indonesia: RTV (4 matches in semifinals, third place match, and final)
- Italy: RAI
- Japan: BS Fuji, Fuji TV One Two Next
- Malaysia: Astro
- Mexico: Televisa / TDN, TV Azteca
- New Zealand: Sky Sport
- Paraguay: Tigo Sports
- Peru: Latina Televisión
- Philippines: ABS-CBN
- Poland: Eurosport
- South America: DirecTV
- Taiwan: ELTA TV (4 matches in semifinals, third place match, and final)
- United Kingdom: Eurosport, BBC (final only)
- United States: Fox Sports, Telemundo
- Uruguay: Tigo Sports
- Venezuela: DirecTV, Meridiano Televisión, Venevisión
- Vietnam: VTV, FPT Group
