= 2016 Suwon JS Cup =

Tournament details
- Host country: South Korea
- City: Suwon
- Dates: 18 May 2016– 22 May 2016
- Teams: 4 (from 3 confederations)
- Venue(s): 1 (in 1 host city)

The 2016 Suwon JS Cup was an international football friendly tournament. The tournament was used to prepare the host organisers for the 2017 FIFA U-20 World Cup in South Korea.

Pos	Team	Pld	W	D	L	GF	GA	GD	Pts
1	South Korea (H, C)	3	2	1	0	3	1	+2	7
2	Brazil	3	1	2	0	5	4	+1	5
3	France	3	1	0	2	4	4	0	3
4	Japan	3	0	1	2	3	6	−3	1

(C) Champions; (H) Hosts
18 May 2016

France	3–1	Japan
Blas 7', 15', 25'	report (FFF.fr) report (jfa.jp)	Kakita 39'

Suwon World Cup Stadium
18 May 2016

South Korea	1–1	Brazil
Chanhee 38'	report (kfa.or.kr)	Evandro 4'

Suwon World Cup Stadium

20 May 2016

Japan	2–2	Brazil
Ito 35'; Wada 39'	report (jfa.jp)

Suwon World Cup Stadium
20 May 2016

South Korea	1–0	France
Lee 2'	report (fff.fr)

Suwon World Cup Stadium

22 May 2016

Brazil	2–1	France
Allan; Evandro	report (fff.fr)	Boga 54'

Suwon World Cup Stadium
22 May 2016

South Korea	1-0	Japan
Cho	report (jfa.jp)

Suwon World Cup Stadium

== Squads ==
=== Brazil ===
Head coach: Rogério Micale

No.	Pos.	Player	Date of birth (age)	Club
	GK	Caíque	31 July 1997 (aged 18)	(Brazil) Esporte Clube Vitória
	GK	Daniel		(Brazil) Palmeiras
	DF	Éder Militão		(Brazil) São Paulo FC
	DF	Léo Xavier		(Brazil) Esporte Clube Vitória
	DF	Murilo Cerqueira		(Brazil) Cruzeiro
	DF	Robson		(Brazil) Santos FC
	DF	Iago Borduchi		(Brazil) Sport Club Internacional
	DF	Raul		(Brazil) Grêmio
	DF	Ayrton		(Brazil) Fluminense FC
	MF	Allan	3 March 1997 (aged 19)	(Belgium) Sint-Truiden (on loan from Liverpool F.C.)
	MF	Everton Felipe		(Brazil) Sport Club do Recife
	MF	Guilherme		(Brazil) Santos FC
	MF	Lucas Paquetá		(Brazil) Clube de Regatas do Flamengo
	MF	Douglas		(Brazil) Fluminense FC
	FW	Caio Monteiro		(Brazil) CR Vasco da Gama
	FW	Evandro		(Brazil) Coritiba
	FW	Léo Jabá		(Brazil) Sport Club Corinthians Paulista
	FW	Matheusinho		(Brazil) América Mineiro
	FW	Nickson		(Brazil) Esporte Clube Vitória
	FW	Giovanny		(Brazil) Atlético Paranaense

=== France ===
Head coach: Ludovic Batelli

No.	Pos.	Player	Date of birth (age)	Club
	GK	Paul Bernardoni	18 April 1997 (aged 19)	(France) Bordeaux
	GK	Quentin Braat	6 July 1997 (aged 18)	(France) Nantes
	DF	Olivier Boscagli	18 November 1997 (aged 18)	(France) Nice
	DF	Sylvain Deslandes	25 April 1997 (aged 19)	(England) Wolverhampton Wanderers
	DF	Issa Diop	9 January 1997 (aged 19)	(France) Toulouse
	DF	Jeando Fuchs	11 October 1997 (aged 18)	(France) Sochaux
	DF	Jérémy Gelin	24 April 1997 (aged 19)	(France) Rennes
	DF	Enock Kwateng	9 April 1997 (aged 19)	(France) Nantes
	DF	Clément Michelin	11 May 1997 (aged 19)	(France) Toulouse
	MF	Ludovic Blas	31 December 1997 (aged 18)	(France) Guingamp
	MF	Amine Harit	18 June 1997 (aged 18)	(France) Nantes
	MF	Arnaud Lusamba	4 January 1997 (aged 19)	(France) Nancy
	MF	Christopher Nkunku	14 November 1997 (aged 18)	(France) Paris Saint-Germain
	MF	Denis-Will Poha	28 May 1997 (aged 18)	(France) Rennes
	MF	Lucas Tousart	29 April 1997 (aged 19)	(France) Lyon
	FW	Florian Ayé	9 January 1997 (aged 19)	(France) Auxerre
	FW	Jérémie Boga	3 January 1997 (aged 19)	(France) Rennes
	FW	Axel Prohouly	30 June 1997 (aged 18)	(England) Queens Park Rangers
	FW	Paulin Puel	9 May 1997 (aged 19)	(France) Nice

=== Japan ===
Head coach: Atsushi Uchiyama

No.	Pos.	Player	Date of birth (age)	Club
1	GK	Ryosuke Kojima	30 January 1997 (aged 19)	(Japan) Waseda University
12	GK	Riku Hirosue	6 July 1998 (aged 17)	(Japan) Aomori Yamada High School
5	DF	Hiroki Noda	27 July 1997 (aged 18)	(Japan) Gamba Osaka
2	DF	Takahiro Yanagi	5 August 1997 (aged 18)	(Japan) F.C. Tokyo
4	DF	Koki Machida	25 August 1997 (aged 18)	(Japan) Kashima Antlers
16	DF	Masaya Kojima	9 November 1997 (aged 18)	(Japan) Vegalta Sendai
6	DF	Takuma Ominami	13 December 1997 (aged 18)	(Japan) Jubilo Iwata
19	DF	Kakeru Funaki	13 April 1998 (aged 18)	(Japan) Cerezo Osaka U-18
10	MF	Daisuke Sakai	18 January 1997 (aged 19)	(Japan) Oita Trinita
3	MF	Yuta Nakayama	16 February 1997 (aged 19)	(Japan) Kashiwa Reysol
7	MF	Yuta Kamiya	24 April 1997 (aged 19)	(Japan) Shonan Bellmare
17	MF	Mizuki Ichimaru	8 May 1997 (aged 19)	(Japan) Gamba Osaka
14	MF	Akito Takagi	4 August 1997 (aged 18)	(Japan) Gamba Osaka
18	MF	Keita Endo	22 November 1997 (aged 18)	(Japan) Yokohama F・Marinos
20	MF	Ryo Sato	24 November 1997 (aged 18)	(Japan) Meiji University
8	MF	Ryotaro Ito	6 February 1998 (aged 18)	(Japan) Urawa Reds
13	FW	Masashi Wada	11 April 1997 (aged 19)	(Japan) Yokohama F・Marinos
11	FW	Yuki Kakita	14 July 1997 (aged 18)	(Japan) Kashima Antlers
15	FW	Ritsu Doan	16 June 1998 (aged 17)	(Japan) Gamba Osaka
9	FW	Shunta Nakamura	10 May 1999 (aged 17)	(Japan) Kashiwa Reysol U-18

=== South Korea ===
Head coach: Iksoo An

No.	Pos.	Player	Date of birth (age)	Club
	GK	Bumkeun Song	15 October 1997 (aged 18)	(South Korea) Korea University
	GK	Jungin Moon	16 March 1998 (aged 18)	(South Korea) Hyundai High School
	DF	Sangmin Lee	1 January 1998 (aged 18)	(South Korea) Sungsil University
	DF	Taewook Jeong	16 May 1997 (aged 19)	(South Korea) Ajou University
	DF	Ikjin Choe	3 May 1997 (aged 19)	(South Korea) Ajou University
	DF	Youhyeon Lee	8 February 1997 (aged 19)	(South Korea) Dankook University
	DF	Jonggyu Yoon	20 March 1998 (aged 18)	(South Korea) Shingal High School
	DF	Chanyang Woo	27 April 1997 (aged 19)	(South Korea) Pohang Steelers
	DF	Chanwoo Shin	8 February 1997 (aged 19)	(South Korea) Yonsei University
	MF	Hanbin Park	21 September 1997 (aged 18)	(South Korea) Daegu FC
	MF	Seungmo Lee	30 March 1998 (aged 18)	(South Korea) POSCO High School
	MF	Geonung Kim	29 August 1997 (aged 18)	(South Korea) Ulsan Hyundai
	MF	Minhyeok Lim	5 March 1997 (aged 19)	(South Korea) FC Seoul
	MF	Chanhee Han	17 March 1997 (aged 19)	(South Korea) Jeonnam Dragons
	FW	Moogun Kim	21 April 1997 (aged 19)	(South Korea) Ulsan Hyundai Mipo Dolphin FC
	FW	Siwoo Kim	26 June 1997 (aged 18)	(South Korea) Gwangju FC
	FW	Siwoo Kim	30 June 1998 (aged 17)	(South Korea) Daegun High School
	FW	Dongjun Lee	1 February 1997 (aged 19)	(South Korea) Sungsil University
	FW	Youngwook Cho	5 February 1999 (aged 17)	(South Korea) Eonnam High School
	FW	Dujae Won	18 November 1997 (aged 18)	(South Korea) Hanyang University
