= Shemmy Mayembe =

Zambian footballer (born 1997)

Personal information
- Date of birth: 22 November 1997 (age 28)
- Place of birth: Zambia
- Height: 1.74 m (5 ft 9 in)
- Position: Right-back

Team information
- Current team: ZESCO United

Senior career*
Years	Team	Apps	(Gls)
2016–2020	ZESCO United		
2020–2021	Mynai	21	(0)
2021–	ZESCO United		

International career
2017	Zambia U20	10	(1)
2019	Zambia U23	3	(0)
2018–	Zambia	6	(0)
- * Club domestic league appearances and goals as of 12 May 2021

Shemmy Mayembe (born 22 November 1997) is a Zambian professional footballer who plays as a right-back for ZESCO United in the Zambia Super League and the Zambia national team.

== Club career ==
=== ZESCO United (2016–2020) ===
Mayembe began his senior career with ZESCO United in 2016. During his first stint with the club, he established himself as a reliable defender, contributing to multiple league campaigns and appearing in the CAF Champions League.

=== FC Mynai (2020–2021) ===
In September 2020, Mayembe made a significant move to Europe, signing with the Ukrainian side FC Mynai. He made 21 appearances in the Ukrainian Premier League during the 2020–21 season. Following the conclusion of his contract and the onset of regional instability, he left the club in mid-2021.

=== ZESCO United (2022–present) ===
After a brief period as a free agent, Mayembe returned to ZESCO United in January 2022. As of 2026, he remains a core member of the squad, recently featuring prominently in the 2025–26 CAF Confederation Cup group stages against clubs like Zamalek and Kaizer Chiefs.

== International career ==
Mayembe represented Zambia at the 2017 Africa U-20 Cup of Nations, where the team secured the title on home soil, and subsequently competed in the 2017 FIFA U-20 World Cup, notably scoring the winning goal in a 4–3 extra-time victory over Germany in the Round of 16. He later appeared for the under-23 national team during the 2019 Africa U-23 Cup of Nations. At the senior level, Mayembe made his debut for the Zambia national team on 2 June 2018 against Namibia and was a member of the squad that won the 2022 COSAFA Cup. He has earned 11 senior caps and continues to be included in national team selections, including the qualification phases for the 2025–26 Africa Cup of Nations.
