= Hyundai Fomex =

South Korean film equipment company

HYUNDAI FOMEX Co., Ltd.
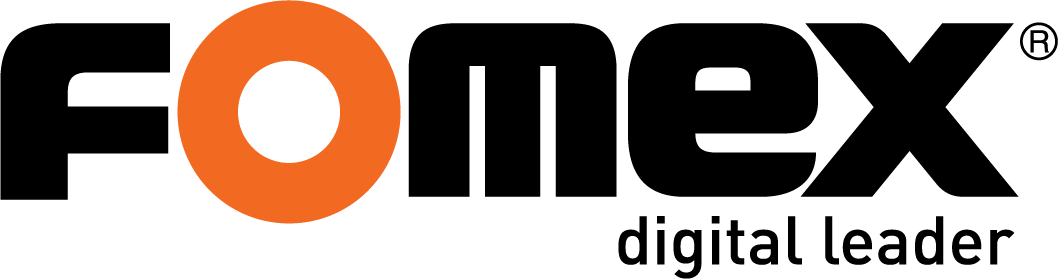
- Industry: Appliance manufacturing
- Founded: 1996; 30 years ago in Seoul, Korea
- Headquarters: Seoul, Korea
- Key people: Jayson K. Yoo/Yoo Jae-kyun (CEO)
- Products: Lighting systems
- Website: http://www.fomex.com/

Hyundai Fomex Co., Ltd. is a South Korean manufacturer of photographic and broadcasting lighting equipment. The company was founded in May 1992 as Hyundai Yanghaeng, incorporated in 1996, and renamed Hyundai Fomex in 1999. It developed Korea’s first digital studio flash and has since expanded its product lineup to include LED lighting systems and studio flashes.

In 2010, Hyundai Fomex established a research and development center to advance broadcasting equipment technologies and began participating in international exhibitions such as NAB (USA), IBC (Netherlands), and Inter BEE (Japan). Its products are exported to markets in North America, Europe, and Asia. The company has received recognition for its products, including the VIP ASIA Award for Best Product in 2013 and Product of the Year in 2014.

== History ==
2024.07

• Selected as official lighting provider for content production at the 33rd Paris Summer Olympics

2024.07.19

• Hosted the KPPA Korea Portrait Photography Awards – FOMEX AWARDS Ceremony

2023.04

• Selected for the “Global Small Giant 1000+ Project” by the Ministry of SMEs and Startups (MSS)

2022.05

• Selected for the “Global Small Giant 1000+ Project” by MSS

2022.11

• FOMEX RollLite chosen for content production at the 2022 FIFA World Cup Qatar

2022.09

• UK distributor “OCTICA” recognized as a 2022 Hi-Seoul Friends Company

2022.02.08

• Launched the “Peripara” umbrella-type softbox

2021.07.08

• Exported LED broadcast lighting for content production at UEFA EURO 2020

2019.10.28

• Hosted the 1st FOMEX AWARDS Ceremony

2019.06.13

• Selected as a Small Giant Company 2019 by the Ministry of Employment and Labor

2019.07

• Strengthened global initiatives by joining IABM (International Association for Broadcast & Media Technology Suppliers)

2018.04

• Selected as a Global Small Giant Company

2018.01

• Awarded Korea Excellent Brand Award – Lighting Equipment Category

2017.07

• Ranked No.1 in Customer Satisfaction (Photography Lighting Category)

2017.04

• Awarded at the Hi-Seoul Good Products Awards (Photography and Broadcast LED Lighting)

2017.02

• Received the Hi-Seoul Brand Export Excellence Award (2016)

2015.11

• Selected as one of the Top 100 Brands in Asia at VIP ASIA Awards 2015

2015.09

• Launched FLEXIBLE LED broadcast lighting

2015.03.27

• Signed industry-academia cooperation agreement with Chung-Ang University

2015.01.29

• Designated as a Hi-Seoul Brand Company by the Seoul Metropolitan Government

2014.12.11

• Awarded the Outstanding Electronic Commerce Operator Certification by NIPA

2014.11

• Selected as VIP ASIA 2014 Outstanding Product in Asia IT and Electronics Industry

2013.11

• Selected as VIP ASIA 2013 Outstanding Product in Asia IT and Electronics Industry

2013

• Launched the FOMEX E Flash

2012.10

• Established the R&D Center (Company-affiliated Research Institute)

2010

• Selected as a Promising Export Small Business

2009.02

• Launched DR.RAY 2.4GHz Trigger

• Launched N-LIGHT Electrode-less Light for Photography and Video

2009–2010

• Recognized as VIP ASIA 2009–2010 H1 Outstanding Product

2008

• Acquired INNOBIZ Certification for Technological Innovation

• Certified as an Excellent Venture Company

2006.04

• Launched FOMEX D Studio Flash

2005

• Selected as Korea Excellent Quality Company (by major press)

2005.08

• Launched CRICKET FLASH

1992

• Established Hyundai Yanghaeng

• Released Korea’s first digital studio flash

== Products ==
=== LED Lights ===
Flexible LED FL600/FL1200

The Flexible LED 600 is an LED studio light designed to address the limitations of conventional products through a flexible form factor that allows it to be shaped as needed. Its compact and lightweight design facilitates storage and transport, enabling use in a wide range of locations without spatial constraints. The Flexible LED 600 offers selectable color options, including daylight and tungsten, a high color rendering index (CRI) of 96+, and a maximum output of 2,000 lux at 1 meter. It is equipped with a digital dimmer that enables precise light adjustment from 0% to 100% for controlled diffusion. With an IP64 rating for water resistance and flicker-free performance, the device is suited for high-quality video production and reflects ongoing trends toward greening, smart technology, and convergence.

The Flexible LED 1200 maintains the flexible design of its predecessor while offering enhanced performance, with a color temperature of up to 6500K and a luminous output of up to 4,000 lux. Designed with hybrid technology, the Flexible LED 1200 is a compact lighting system optimized for both indoor and outdoor use. It is lightweight, has a small bending radius, and a thin profile, allowing it to adapt to various work environments and meet a wide range of user requirements regardless of location.

=== Strobe Lighting ===
The Fomex D series is a line of digital strobes. The Fomex Dp, incorporates the Prop function, which allows users to preview the strobe’s set brightness through the modeling light. It features a digital user interface (UI), capacitors for proven reliability, and a high-performance flash tube, ensuring consistent and powerful output with precise and detailed lighting even during repeated use.

The Fomex E and G studio flashes have been improved in both exterior design and user interface (UI), focusing on stability and color reproduction. The E series allows for quick adjustment of light output using the finder and jog dial functions and includes an overcharge warning LED lamp for better visual monitoring. The Fomex G600 is an ultra-high-speed strobe designed for rapid shooting, offering a flash duration as short as 1/8000 second and supporting more than 30 frames per second.

=== Light Modifiers ===
The Peri Bounce series is a set of photographic accessories designed to reflect or diffuse light during photo and video shoots, making it especially useful for outdoor photography where natural sunlight is the primary light source. The Peri Bounce is engineered to improve shooting environments, featuring a lightweight yet durable circular frame made from aluminum that provides high rigidity, preventing bending or breakage. An elastic cord inserted inside the frame allows for quick assembly and disassembly without risk of losing parts. When disassembled, the frame collapses to a minimal size for easy storage and transport in a carrying bag. In addition, a variety of fabric options—including diffusers and five frame reflector colors, as well as six reflector colors—can be selected to suit different shooting conditions.

== Exhibitions ==
2024.11.13: Inter BEE (Japan)

2023.11.15: Inter BEE (Japan) – Introduced LED broadcast lighting STELLAR

2022.11.16: Inter BEE (Japan) – Introduced FLEX COLOR

2021.11.26: Inter BEE (Japan) – Debuted RGB LED lighting

2022.09.09: IBC (Amsterdam) – Introduced FOMEX CL3000 ‘Panel Light’

2019.04.08: NAB (USA)

2019.06.18: BCA (Singapore) – Introduced RollLite lighting

2019.11.15: Inter BEE (Japan)

2017: IBC (Amsterdam)

2016: PHOTOKINA (Cologne)

2016: IBC (Amsterdam)

2015: IBC (Amsterdam)

2014: PHOTOKINA (Cologne)

2012: PHOTOKINA (Cologne), NAB SHOW (Las Vegas)

2010: PHOTOKINA (Cologne), PHOTONEXT Studio Photography Fair (Tokyo)

2009: PIZ Studio Photography Fair (Tokyo), PHOTO WORLD Dubai (Dubai), PMA (Las Vegas)

2008: PHOTOKINA (Cologne)

2007: Taormina Exhibition (Italy), SONIMAG FOTO (Barcelona), PHOTO SHOW Milano (Milan), PIE (Tokyo), PMA (Las Vegas)

2006: PIE (Tokyo), PHOTOKINA (Cologne)

2004: Photographic Equipment Exhibition (Guangzhou)

2002: PHOTOKINA (Cologne)

2000: PHOTOKINA (Cologne)

1998: PHOTOKINA (Cologne)

1997: IPPF (Tokyo), Photographic Equipment Exhibition (Beijing)

1996: PMA (Las Vegas)
