= HDC Hyundai EP =

South Korean manufacturing company

HDC Hyundai EP HDC현대EP
- Company type: Public
- Founded: Jan, 2000
- Headquarters: Chungcheongnam-do, South Korea
- Key people: Shin Woo Churl
- Number of employees: 398 (2017)
- Website: www.hdc-hyundaiep.com

Founded in 1988 as the Petrochemical Division of HDC Group, Hyundai EP signed technology transfer contract with Solvay Engineered Polymer in 1991, focusing on developing advanced technologies, and built a compounding factory in Dangjin in 1994 to start developing and producing automobile bumpers and interior materials. After the department's separation from HDC in January 2000, Hyundai Engineering Plastic was established and strived to pioneer an independent market. Hyundai EP is developing fast with 25% of average annual growth since its foundation in 2000.

Hyundai EP has four Business Units (PP Compounding BU, PE Compounding BU, PS/EPS BU and PB-1 PIPE BU). The Dangjin factory produces super engineering plastic, which can replace metals, based on the company's accumulated technologies and experiences, while the Jincheon factory is focused on producing PE compound, which is used for rubber parts of automobiles and electric and electronic products, steel pipe coating and adhesion materials, construction pipes, and containers, etc. The Ulsan factory of Hyundai EP has EPS and PS production lines, and the Jochiwon factory, after acquiring the construction material department from PEM Korea, develops and produces PB pipe, which is great for energy saving. Meanwhile, having taken the top market share in the automobile PP compound market, with 25% of average annual growth rate, Hyundai EP creates more enriched future with ceaseless challenge even in the top position.

Hyundai EP is building a global network of manufacturing bases connecting Nagoya in Japan, Beijing, Suzhou, Guangzhou, and Dafeng, in China, and Chennai in india. In addition, through the partnership with LyondellBasell, the company is striving to expand the market to Turkey, Czech Republic, Slovakia, Brazil, and Alabama and Georgia, US.

With continuous research and development for the last 25 years and discovery of domestic and international markets, Hyundai EP has won several Export Awards such as 10 Million Dollars in 2007, 50 Million Dollars in 2008, 70 Million Dollars in 2010, 200 Million Dollars in 2011. Also in 2012, Hyundai EP was awarded the 'IR 52 Jan Young-Sil' with 'Cloth Looking Filler Trim'.
