= 2017 U-20 Africa Cup of Nations qualification =

2017 Africa U-20 Cup of Nations qualification
Tournament details
- Dates: 1 April – 24 July 2016
- Teams: 54 (from 1 confederation)

Tournament statistics
- Matches played: 57
- Goals scored: 127 (2.23 per match)

The qualification phase of the 2017 Africa U-20 Cup of Nations decided the participating teams of the final tournament. A total of eight teams will play in the final tournament, to be hosted by Zambia.

The draws were conducted during the CAF Executive Committee meeting held on Friday, 5 February 2016 in Kigali, Rwanda.

== Participants ==
No Participation	Teams	Number of teams
No participation	Cape Verde; Central African Republic; Comoros; Djibouti; Equatorial Guinea; Eritrea; Guinea-Bissau; Madagascar; São Tomé and Príncipe; Seychelles; South Sudan; Tanzania; Togo	13
First round entrants	Algeria; Angola; Botswana; Burundi; Chad; DR Congo; Ethiopia; Gambia; Guinea; Kenya; Liberia; Mauritania; Mauritius; Mozambique; Namibia; Niger; Rwanda; Sierra Leone; Somalia; Sudan; Swaziland; Tunisia; Uganda; Zimbabwe	24
Second round entrants	Benin; Burkina Faso; Cameroon; Congo; Egypt; Gabon; Ghana; Ivory Coast; Lesotho; Libya; Malawi; Mali; Morocco; Nigeria; Senegal; South Africa	16
Final tournament entrants	Zambia (hosts)	1

== Format ==
Qualification ties were played on a home-and-away two-legged basis. If the aggregate score was tied after the second leg, the away goals rule would be applied, and if still level, the penalty shoot-out would be used to determine the winner (no extra time would be played).

The seven winners of the third round qualified for the final tournament.

== First round ==
The first legs were played on 1, 2 and 3 April, and the second legs were played on 22, 23 and 24 April 2016.

Team 1	Agg.	Team 2	1st leg	2nd leg
Tunisia	4–1	Niger	3–0	1–1
Ethiopia	4–1	Somalia	2–1	2–0
Sierra Leone	0–4	Gambia	0–2	0–2
Liberia	1–3	Guinea	0–2	1–1
Algeria	2–3	Mauritania	2–1	0–2
Sudan	awd. (Note: Kenya were disqualified after fielding five over-age players (Erick Ouma Otieno, Nicholas Kipkirui, Boniface Muchiri, Eugene Moses Mukangula and Theodore Kibet Kilele) in the first leg against Sudan.)	Kenya	1–1	Cancelled
Burundi	w/o	DR Congo	Cancelled	Cancelled
Rwanda	awd. (Note: Uganda were disqualified after fielding a player (James Aheebwa) whose date of birth on his passport was different to the date of birth on his CAF Inter-Clubs license, an occurrence prohibited within CAF regulations.)	Uganda	1–1	1–2
Angola	w/o	Chad	Cancelled	Cancelled
Mozambique	2–2 (a)	Mauritius	1–0	1–2
Swaziland	2–4	Namibia	2–2	0–2
Zimbabwe	2–1	Botswana	0–1	2–0

1 April 2016
15:00 (UTC+1)

Tunisia	3–0	Niger
Radaoui 5'; Khemiri 61'; Serarfi 68'	Report

Stade Oued Ellil, Oued Ellil
Referee: Adel Mukhtar Adam (Sudan)
23 April 2016
16:00 (UTC+1)

Niger	1–1	Tunisia
Badamassi 74'	Report	Dhib 60'

Stade Général-Seyni-Kountché, Niamey
Referee: Kouassi Frederic Biro (Ivory Coast)

Tunisia won 4–1 on aggregate.

3 April 2016
16:00 (UTC+3)

Ethiopia	2–1	Somalia
Awal 26'; Shibru 80'	Report	Isse 77'

Addis Ababa Stadium, Addis Ababa
Referee: Nsoro Ruzindana (Rwanda)
22 April 2016
15:30 (UTC+3)

Somalia	0–2	Ethiopia
	Report	Demte 47' (pen.); Amada 49'

Stade du Ville, Djibouti City (Djibouti) (Note: Somalia played their home leg in Djibouti due to the Somali Civil War.)
Referee: Georges Gatogato (Burundi)

Ethiopia won 4–1 on aggregate.

2 April 2016
04:00 (UTC−5)

Sierra Leone	0–2	Gambia
	Report	Sanneh 65'; Jallow 72'

Wusum Sports Stadium, Makeni
Referee: Issa Sy (Senegal)
23 April 2016
16:30 (UTC±0)

Gambia	2–0	Sierra Leone
Babou 32'; Jobe 68'	Report

Independence Stadium, Bakau
Referee: Abderahmane Kelly (Mauritania)

Gambia won 4–0 on aggregate.

3 April 2016
04:00 (UTC±0)

Liberia	0–2	Guinea
	Report	I. Sylla 41', 64'

Antoinette Tubman Stadium, Monrovia
Referee: Ibrahim Haïdara (Mali)
24 April 2016
17:00 (UTC±0)

Guinea	1–1	Liberia
Yansane 10'	Report	Nimely 81'

Stade du 28 Septembre, Conakry
Referee: Kokou N'tale (Togo)

Guinea won 3–1 on aggregate.

3 April 2016
16:00 (UTC+1)

Algeria	2–1	Mauritania
Hamra 12'; El Melali 45' (pen.)	Report	El Hacen 25'

Stade Omar Hamadi, Algiers
Referee: Haythem Guirat (Tunisia)
24 April 2016
16:00 (UTC±0)

Mauritania	2–0	Algeria
El Hacen 35' (pen.); Tanjy 90'	Report

Stade Olympique, Nouakchott
Referee: Manuel Timas Mendes (Cape Verde)

Mauritania won 3–2 on aggregate.

3 April 2016
20:00 (UTC+3)

Sudan	1–1	Kenya
Mutwakil 27'	Report	Odhiambo 46' (pen.)

Al-Merrikh Stadium, Omdurman
Referee: Biruk Yemanabran Kassaun (Ethiopia)
23 April 2016
15:00 (UTC+3)

Kenya	Cancelled	Sudan
	Report

Nyayo National Stadium, Nairobi
Referee: Mahmoud Al-Banna (Egypt)

Sudan advanced after Kenya were disqualified.

2 April 2016
15:00 (UTC+2)

Burundi	Cancelled	DR Congo
	Report

Prince Louis Rwagasore Stadium, Bujumbura
Referee: Mfaume Ali Nassoro (Tanzania)
22 April 2016
15:00 (UTC+2)

DR Congo	Cancelled	Burundi
	Report

Stade TP Mazembe, Lubumbashi
Referee: Mihindou Mbina Gauthier (Gabon)

Burundi advanced after DR Congo withdrew.

2 April 2016
15:30 (UTC+2)

Rwanda	1–1	Uganda
Blaise 17'	Report	Edrisa 34'

Stade Régional Nyamirambo, Kigali
Referee: Serge Soumou (Congo)
23 April 2016
16:00 (UTC+3)

Uganda	2–1	Rwanda
Azake 20', 58' (pen.)	Report	Abeddy 18'

Mandela National Stadium, Kampala
Referee: Israel Mpaima (Kenya)

Uganda won 3–2 on aggregate. However, Rwanda advanced after Uganda were disqualified.

2 April 2016
16:00 (UTC+1)

Angola	Cancelled	Chad
	Report

Estádio dos Coqueiros, Luanda
Referee: Malala Kabanga Yannick (DR Congo)
22 April 2016
15:30 (UTC+1)

Chad	Cancelled	Angola
	Report

Stade Nacional, N'Djamena
Referee: Hassane Abdou (Niger)

Angola advanced after Chad withdrew.

2 April 2016
15:00 (UTC+2)

Mozambique	1–0	Mauritius
Renato 74'	Report

Estádio da Machava, Maputo
Referee: Lebalang Mokete (Lesotho)
23 April 2016
15:20 (UTC+4)

Mauritius	2–1	Mozambique
Pascal 29'; Neelesh 90+4'	Report	Vincent 57' (o.g.)

Stade George V, Curepipe
Referee: Nelson Emile Fred (Seychelles)

2–2 on aggregate. Mozambique won on away goals.

2 April 2016
15:00 (UTC+2)

Swaziland	2–2	Namibia
Mtetwa 38'; Figareido 56' (pen.)	Report	Kantori 29'; Eib 40'

Somhlolo Stadium, Lobamba
Referee: Ahmad Imtehaz Heerealall (Mauritius)
22 April 2016
15:00 (UTC+1)

Namibia	2–0	Swaziland
Hakuria 25'; Tjikundi 51'	Report

Sam Nujoma Stadium, Windhoek
Referee: Abdoul Ohabee Kanoso (Madagascar)

Namibia won 4–2 on aggregate.

3 April 2016
15:00 (UTC+2)

Zimbabwe	0–1	Botswana
	Report	Legopelo 67'

Barbourfields Stadium, Bulawayo
Referee: Eketsang Setloboko (South Africa)
22 April 2016
19:00 (UTC+2)

Botswana	0–2	Zimbabwe
	Report	Sibanda 1'; Makaha 45+2'

Lobatse Stadium, Lobatse
Referee: Jonas Shongedi (Namibia)

Zimbabwe won 2–1 on aggregate.

== Second round ==
The first legs were played on 20, 21 and 22 May, and the second legs were played on 10, 11, 12 and 13 June 2016.

Team 1	Agg.	Team 2	1st leg	2nd leg
Tunisia	1–4	Senegal	1–2	0–2
Ethiopia	2–5	Ghana	2–1	0–4
Gambia	1–1 (7–6 p)	Morocco	1–0	0–1
Ivory Coast	2–2 (a)	Guinea	1–2	1–0
Burkina Faso	3–3 (a)	Congo	1–1	2–2
Mauritania	1–7	Mali	0–3	1–4
Sudan	w/o	Malawi	Cancelled	Cancelled
Burundi	1–3	Nigeria	0–1	1–2
Rwanda	1–1 (2–3 p)	Egypt	0–1	1–0
Angola	3–1	Gabon	3–0	0–1
Mozambique	1–2	Lesotho	1–1	0–1
Namibia	0–2	South Africa	0–0	0–2
Zimbabwe	0–3	Cameroon	0–0	0–3
Libya	w/o	Benin	Cancelled	Cancelled

21 May 2016
16:00 (UTC+1)

Tunisia	1–2	Senegal
Raed 49'	Report	Niane 2' (pen.), 79'

Stade Oued Ellil, Oued Ellil
Referee: Mustapha Ghorbal (Algeria)
11 June 2016
17:00 (UTC±0)

Senegal	2–0	Tunisia
Badji 68', 89'	Report

Stade Demba Diop, Dakar
Referee: Baba Leno (Guinea)

Senegal won 4–1 on aggregate.

22 May 2016
16:00 (UTC+3)

Ethiopia	2–1	Ghana
Amada 4', 8'	Report	Osabutey 87'

Addis Ababa Stadium, Addis Ababa
Referee: Mfaume Ali Nassoro (Tanzania)
13 June 2016
12:00 (UTC±0)

Ghana	4–0	Ethiopia
Yeboah 6', 76'; D. Mohammed 8'; Mensah 57'	Report

Cape Coast Sports Stadium, Cape Coast
Referee: Raymond Coker (Sierra Leone)

Ghana won 5–2 on aggregate.

21 May 2016
17:00 (UTC±0)

Gambia	1–0	Morocco
P. Jobe 42'	Report

Independence Stadium, Bakau
Referee: Abdoulaye Rhissa Al-Mustapha (Niger)
12 June 2016
21:45 (UTC±0)

Morocco	1–0	Gambia
En-Nesyri 68'	Report
Penalties
En-Nesyri (penalty scored); Youssoufi (penalty scored); Harouz (penalty scored); Hannouri (penalty scored); Mendyl (penalty scored); El Bouazzati (penalty scored); Ben Ktib (penalty missed)	6–7	(penalty scored) Babou; (penalty scored) E. Jobe; (penalty scored) Ceesay; (penalty scored) Sanneh; (penalty scored) P. Jobe; (penalty scored) A. Jallow; (penalty scored) Faye

Stade Prince Moulay Al Hassan, Rabat
Referee: Esam Al-Jahani (Libya)

1–1 on aggregate. Gambia won 7–6 on penalties.

21 May 2016
15:30 (UTC±0)

Ivory Coast	1–2	Guinea
Diallo 78'	Report	Fernandez 22', 50'

Stade Robert Champroux, Abidjan
Referee: Reginald Lathbridge (Ghana)
12 June 2016
16:30 (UTC±0)

Guinea	0–1	Ivory Coast
	Report	Sangare 69'

Stade du 28 Septembre, Conakry
Referee: Manuel Timas Mendes (Cape Verde)

2–2 on aggregate. Guinea won on away goals.

21 May 2016
16:00 (UTC±0)

Burkina Faso	1–1	Congo
Kahan 12'	Report	Gassama 8'

Stade du 4 Août, Ouagadougou
Referee: Bakary Camara (Gambia)
12 June 2016
15:30 (UTC+1)

Congo	2–2	Burkina Faso
Goyi 55'; Mondonga 84'	Report	Karidoula 59'; Lingani 90+3'

Stade Alphonse Massemba-Débat, Brazzaville
Referee: Mal Souley Mohamadou (Cameroon)

3–3 on aggregate. Burkina Faso won on away goals.

20 May 2016
16:30 (UTC±0)

Mauritania	0–3	Mali
	Report	Maiga 24', 38'; Diakité 90+1' (pen.)

Stade Olympique, Nouakchott
Referee: Adil Zourak (Morocco)
12 June 2016
17:00 (UTC±0)

Mali	4–1	Mauritania
Traoré 2'; Maiga 25', 69', 90+4'	Report	Tanjy 48'

Stade Modibo Kéïta, Bamako
Referee: Maguette N'Diaye (Senegal)

Mali won 7–1 on aggregate.

20 May 2016
20:00 (UTC+3)

Sudan	Cancelled	Malawi
	Report

Al-Merrikh Stadium, Omdurman
10 June 2016
14:30 (UTC+2)

Malawi	Cancelled	Sudan
	Report

Kamuzu Stadium, Blantyre

Sudan advanced after Malawi withdrew.

21 May 2016
15:00 (UTC+2)

Burundi	0–1	Nigeria
	Report	Agor 60'

Prince Louis Rwagasore Stadium, Bujumbura
Referee: Mashood Ssali (Uganda)
11 June 2016
16:00 (UTC+1)

Nigeria	2–1	Burundi
Osimhen 72' (pen.); Nwakali 81'	Report	Ndikumana 87'

U. J. Esuene Stadium, Calabar
Referee: Boureima Sanogo (Burkina Faso)

Nigeria won 3–1 on aggregate.

22 May 2016
15:30 (UTC+2)

Rwanda	0–1	Egypt
	Report	Taher 50'

Stade Régional Nyamirambo, Kigali
Referee: Djamal Aden Abdi (Djibouti)
10 June 2016
22:00 (UTC+2)

Egypt	0–1	Rwanda
	Report	Niyibizi 83'
Penalties
Galal (penalty scored); Mostafa (penalty missed); Ragab (penalty missed); Hamdy (penalty scored); Sobhi (penalty scored)	3–2	(penalty missed) Usabimana; (penalty missed) Nshuti; (penalty scored) Biramahire; (penalty scored) Itangishaka; (penalty missed) Niyonkuru

Cairo International Stadium, Cairo
Attendance: 10,000
Referee: Haileyesus Bazezew (Ethiopia)

1–1 on aggregate. Egypt won 3–2 on penalties.

21 May 2016
16:00 (UTC+1)

Angola	3–0	Gabon
Vá 13'; Chabalala 74'; Amândio 76'	Report

Estádio dos Coqueiros, Luanda
Referee: Stanley Hachiwa (Zambia)
11 June 2016
15:30 (UTC+2)

Gabon	1–0	Angola
Nzigou 43'	Report

Stade Augustin Monédan de Sibang, Libreville
Referee: Abdullahi Shuaibu (Nigeria)

Angola won 3–1 on aggregate.

21 May 2016
15:00 (UTC+2)

Mozambique	1–1	Lesotho
Langa 15'	Report	Mohapi 20'

Estádio da Machava, Maputo
Referee: Simanga Nhleko (Swaziland)
12 June 2016
15:38 (UTC+2)

Lesotho	1–0	Mozambique
Koloti 32'	Report

Setsoto Stadium, Maseru
Referee: Dennis Nguluwe (Malawi)

Lesotho won 2–1 on aggregate.

21 May 2016
15:00 (UTC+1)

Namibia	0–0	South Africa
	Report

Sam Nujoma Stadium, Windhoek
Referee: Tirelo Mositwane (Botswana)
11 June 2016
15:00 (UTC+2)

South Africa	2–0	Namibia
Lakay 25' (pen.); Jordan 88'	Report

FNB Stadium, Johannesburg
Referee: Allister Barra (Seychelles)

South Africa won 2–0 on aggregate.

22 May 2016
15:00 (UTC+2)

Zimbabwe	0–0	Cameroon
	Report

National Sports Stadium, Harare
Referee: Paulo Talaia (Angola)
12 June 2016
15:00 (UTC+1)

Cameroon	3–0	Zimbabwe
Ayuk 18'; Ekani 21'; Chenkam 88'	Report

Kouekong Stadium, Bafoussam
Referee: Isidore Essono Nze (Gabon)

Cameroon won 3–0 on aggregate.

22 May 2016
18:00 (UTC+1)

Libya	Cancelled	Benin
	Report

TBD
Referee: Sabri Mohamed Fadul (Sudan)
12 June 2016
16:00 (UTC+1)

Benin	Cancelled	Libya
	Report

Stade de l'Amitié, Cotonou
Referee: Harouna Coulibaly (Mali)

Libya advanced due to FIFA's suspension of Benin.

== Third round ==
The first legs were played on 8, 9 and 10 July, and the second legs were played on 22, 23 and 24 July 2016.

Team 1	Agg.	Team 2	1st leg	2nd leg
Senegal	3–2	Ghana	3–1	0–1
Gambia	1–2	Guinea	0–0	1–2
Burkina Faso	0–2	Mali	0–0	0–2
Sudan	5–5 (a)	Nigeria	1–2	4–3
Egypt	5–0	Angola	1–0	4–0
Lesotho	0–5	South Africa	0–2	0–3
Cameroon	3–1	Libya	3–0	0–1

9 July 2016
17:00 (UTC±0)

Senegal	3–1	Ghana
Niane 11', 25', 59'	Report	Osabutey 22'

Stade Demba Diop, Dakar
Referee: Harouna Coulibaly (Mali)
22 July 2016
17:00 (UTC±0)

Ghana	1–0	Senegal
Boateng 31'	Report

Cape Coast Sports Stadium, Cape Coast
Referee: Kouassi Attiogbe (Togo)

Senegal won 3–2 on aggregate.

9 July 2016
17:00 (UTC±0)

Gambia	0–0	Guinea
	Report

Independence Stadium, Bakau
Referee: Mahmoud El Banna (Egypt)
24 July 2016
16:00 (UTC±0)

Guinea	2–1	Gambia
Camara 18'; Yansane 68'	Report	Jobe 85' (pen.)

Stade du 28 Septembre, Conakry
Referee: Edgar Bada (Benin)

Guinea won 2–1 on aggregate.

9 July 2016
15:30 (UTC±0)

Burkina Faso	0–0	Mali
	Report

Stade du 4 Août, Ouagadougou
Referee: Jean Marc Ganamandji (Central African Republic)
24 July 2016
16:00 (UTC±0)

Mali	2–0	Burkina Faso
Koita 9'; Bagayoko 57'	Report

Stade Modibo Kéïta, Bamako
Referee: Alhadi Allaou Mahamat (Chad)

Mali won 2–0 on aggregate.

10 July 2016
20:00 (UTC+3)

Sudan	1–2	Nigeria
Mohamed 27'	Report	Chukwueze 67'; Osimhen 86'

Al-Merrikh Stadium, Omdurman
Referee: Hagi Yabarow Wiish (Somalia)
23 July 2016
16:00 (UTC+1)

Nigeria	3–4	Sudan
Chukwueze 15'; Bamgboye 26'; Okonkwo 66'	Report	Ismail 21'; Nasaan 42', 56', 82'

Teslim Balogun Stadium, Lagos
Referee: Lazard Tsiba Kamba (Congo)

5–5 on aggregate. Sudan won on away goals.

10 July 2016
21:00 (UTC+2)

Egypt	1–0	Angola
Abdalla 57'	Report

Cairo International Stadium, Cairo
Referee: Pacifique Ndabihawenimana (Burundi)
23 July 2016
16:00 (UTC+1)

Angola	0–4	Egypt
	Report	Hassan 12'; Ramadan 44'; Abou El Fotouh 72'; Rayan 90+2'

Estádio 22 de Junho, Luanda
Attendance: 10,000
Referee: Norman Matemera (Zimbabwe)

Egypt won 5–0 on aggregate.

10 July 2016
15:00 (UTC+2)

Lesotho	0–2	South Africa
	Report	Jordan 6'; Sithole 80'

Setsoto Stadium, Maseru
Referee: Helder Martins De Carvalho (Angola)
23 July 2016
15:00 (UTC+2)

South Africa	3–0	Lesotho
Jordan 49'; Mbatha 83'; Rambuwane 88'	Report

Dr. Petrus Molemela Stadium, Bloemfontein
Referee: Joaquin Esono Eyang (Equatorial Guinea)

South Africa won 5–0 on aggregate.

10 July 2016
15:00 (UTC+1)

Cameroon	3–0	Libya
Chenkam 37'; Hongla 44'; Preston 53'	Report

Kouekong Stadium, Bafoussam
Referee: Jean Claude Ishimwe (Rwanda)
24 July 2016
16:00 (UTC+1)

Libya	1–0	Cameroon
Elqjdar 87'	Report

Albalady Stadium, Alkram (Tunisia)
Referee: Idris Mehammed Osman (Eritrea)

Cameroon won 3–1 on aggregate.
