= 2026 CECAFA U-20 Championship =

Tournament details
- Host country: Tanzania
- Dates: 15 – 25 September
- Teams: 9
- Venues: 3 (in 1 host city)

Final positions
- Champions: Sudan (1st title)
- Runners-up: Tanzania
- Third place: Uganda
- Fourth place: Burundi

Tournament statistics
- Matches played: 13
- Goals scored: 35 (2.69 per match)
- Top scorer: (Burundi) Amini Nshimirimana (4 goals)

The 2026 CECAFA U-20 Championship is the 16th edition of the CECAFA U-20 Championship, an international youth football tournament open to national associations of the CECAFA region. It will take place between 15 and 25 September 2026 in Tanzania. This competition served as the CECAFA qualifiers for the 2027 U-20 Africa Cup of Nations.

Tanzania won previous edition title in 2024.

== Teams ==
- Burundi
- Djibouti
- Ethiopia
- Kenya
- Rwanda
- South Sudan
- Sudan
- Tanzania
- Uganda

Did not enter

- Eritrea
- Somalia

== Venues ==
Cities	Venues	Capacity
Dar es Salaam	Uhuru Stadium	23,000

== Match officials ==
Referees

- Ephrame Debele (Ethiopia)
- Joshua Duula (Uganda)
- Dickens Mimisa (Kenya)
- Nasser Houssein (Djibouti)
- Celestin Nsabimana (Rwanda)
- Amro Ismail (Sudan)
- Herry Sasii (Tanzania)
- Anthony Kiri (South Sudan)

Assistant Referees

- Mustefa Meki (Ethiopia)
- Saidi Hamisi Ndayisaba (Rwanda)
- Ashiraf Katerega (Uganda)
- Elizabeth Njoroge (Kenya)
- Nelson Baeina (South Sudan)
- Rachid Waiss (Djibouti)
- Olivier Nibogora (Burundi)
- Kassim Mpanga (Tanzania)

== Draw ==
The draw was held on 31 August 2026 at 12:00 EAT (UTC+3) at Kigali.The 9 teams were drawn into three groups of three teams, with hosts Tanzania seeded in Group A (position A1), Uganda seeded in Group B (position B1) and South Sudan seeded in Group C (position C1). The remaining 6 teams were allocated to two pots based on the results of the previous tournament edition and were drawn to the remaining positions.

Seeded	Pot 1	Pot 2
Tanzania (hosts); South Sudan; Uganda	Ethiopia; Kenya; Sudan	Burundi; Djibouti; Rwanda

== Group stage ==
The group stage is played in 3 groups as a round-robin, where the winners and the best runner-up advanced to the semi-finals.

=== Group A ===
Pos	Team	Pld	W	D	L	GF	GA	GD	Pts	Qualification
1	Tanzania (H)	2	2	0	0	7	0	+7	6	Semi-finals
2	Rwanda	2	0	1	1	0	3	−3	1	
3	Ethiopia	2	0	1	1	0	4	−4	1	

Source: CECAFA
(H) Hosts
15 September 2026
20:00

Tanzania	3–0	Rwanda
Kayanda 30'; Abushiri 38'; Lukanima 42'

Uhuru Stadium, Dar es Salaam
Referee: Dickens Mimisa (Kenya)

17 September 2026
14:00

Rwanda	0–0	Ethiopia

Uhuru Stadium, Dar es Salaam
Referee: Nasser Houssein (Djibouti)

19 September 2026
20:00

Ethiopia	0–4	Tanzania
		Kibaila 30', 45'; Sagwe 53', 57'

Uhuru Stadium, Dar es Salaam
Referee: Dickens Mimisa (Kenya)

=== Group B ===
Pos	Team	Pld	W	D	L	GF	GA	GD	Pts	Qualification
1	Uganda	2	2	0	0	5	1	+4	6	Semi-finals
2	Sudan	2	1	0	1	3	1	+2	3	Semi-finals
3	Djibouti	2	0	0	2	1	7	−6	0	

Source: CECAFA
15 September 2026
14:00

Uganda	4–1	Djibouti
Magala 5', 62'; Odiya 44'; Okello 58'		Tahir 24'

Uhuru Stadium, Dar es Salaam
Referee: Ephrame Debele (Ethiopia)

17 September 2026
17:00

Djibouti	0–3	Sudan
		Omer 8', 85'; Saman 52'

Uhuru Stadium, Dar es Salaam
Referee: Celestin Nsabimana (Rwanda)

19 September 2026
17:00

Sudan	0–1	Uganda
		Munogera 70'

Uhuru Stadium, Dar es Salaam
Referee: Anthony Kiri (South Sudan)

=== Group C ===
Pos	Team	Pld	W	D	L	GF	GA	GD	Pts	Qualification
1	Burundi	2	2	0	0	6	0	+6	6	Semi-finals
2	Kenya	2	0	1	1	1	3	−2	1	
3	South Sudan	2	0	1	1	1	5	−4	1	

Source: CECAFA
15 September 2026
17:00

South Sudan	0–4	Burundi
		Nshimirimana 40', 45+1'; Majidi 75', 77'

Uhuru Stadium, Dar es Salaam
Referee: Joshua Duula (Uganda)

17 September 2026
20:00

Burundi	2–0	Kenya
Nshimirimana 11', 70'

Uhuru Stadium, Dar es Salaam
Referee: Amro Ismail (Sudan)

19 September 2026
14:00

Kenya	1–1	South Sudan
Nacheri 90+4'		Ajoung 27'

Uhuru Stadium, Dar es Salaam
Referee: Herry Sasii (Tanzania)

== Knockout stage ==
=== Semi-finals ===
22 September 2026
12:30

Uganda	2–3	Sudan
Okello 7'; Ssozi 66'		Mohamed 10'; Somi 48'; Albahli Taowr 82'

Uhuru Stadium, Dar es Salaam
Referee: Dickens Mimisa (Kenya)

22 September 2026
16:00

Tanzania	2–0	Burundi
Abushiri 14'; Kayanda 30'

Uhuru Stadium, Dar es Salaam
Referee: Ephrame Debele (Ethiopia)

==== Third place ====
24 September 2026
11:30

Uganda	2–0	Burundi
Ssozi 22'; Kyakuwa 83'

Uhuru Stadium, Dar es Salaam
Referee: Herry Sasii (Tanzania)

==== Final ====
24 September 2026
14:30

Tanzania	1–1 (a.e.t.)	Sudan
Abdallah 110'		Hamd Ahmed 92'
Penalties
	3–4

Uhuru Stadium, Dar es Salaam
Referee: Nasser Houssein (Djibouti)

== Goalscorers ==
There have been 35 goals scored in 13 matches, for an average of 2.69 goals per match (as of 22 September 2026).

4 goals

- (Burundi) Amini Nshimirimana

2 goals

- (Burundi) Sympathique Majidi
- (Sudan) Wail Omer
- (Tanzania) Bashiri Kibaila
- (Tanzania) Faraji Kayanda
- (Tanzania) Juma Abushiri
- (Tanzania) Juma Sagwe
- (Uganda) Derrick Ssozi
- (Uganda) Isima Magala
- (Uganda) Richard Okello

1 goal

- (Djibouti) Ishak Tahir
- (Kenya) Brighton Nacheri
- (South Sudan) Jonathan Ajoung
- (Sudan) Ibrahim Saman
- (Sudan) Mazin Fadul
- (Sudan) Omer Hamd
- (Sudan) Rudwan Yahya
- (Sudan) Waheed Shandi
- (Tanzania) Abdulnassir Abdallah
- (Tanzania) Evastus Lukanima
- (Uganda) Amour Munogera
- (Uganda) Ashraf Kyakuwa
- (Uganda) Ocen Genesis
