= 2019 CECAFA U-20 Championship =

Tournament details
- Host country: Uganda
- Dates: 21 September – 5 October 2019
- Teams: 11

Final positions
- Champions: Tanzania
- Runners-up: Kenya
- Third place: Eritrea
- Fourth place: Sudan

Tournament statistics
- Matches played: 23
- Goals scored: 85 (3.7 per match)
- Top scorer: (Tanzania) Kelvin John (7 goals)

The 2019 CECAFA U-20 Challenge Cup took place from 21 September to 5 October 2019 in Uganda. It was originally expected to take place in January 2019.

== Venues ==
- Pece War Memorial Stadium, Gulu, Uganda
- FUFA Technical Center, Njeru, Uganda

== Teams ==
- Burundi
- Eritrea
- Sudan
- Kenya
- Somalia
- South Sudan
- Tanzania
- Uganda
- Ethiopia
- Zanzibar
- Djibouti

== Officials ==
Referees

- Eric Manirakiza (Burundi)
- Dinareh Mohamed Guedi (Djibouti)
- Israel Mpaima (Kenya)
- Lemma Nigussi (Ethiopia)
- Yonas Zekarias Ghebre (Eritrea)
- (ms) Jonesia Kabakama Rukyaa (Tanzania)
- Martin Sanya (Tanzania)
- Mahmood Shantair Ismael (Sudan)
- Alex Muhabi (Uganda)
- Ali Mfaume Nassoro (Zanzibar)

Assistant Referees

- Oliver Odhiambo (Kenya)
- Ali Mohamed Mahad (Somalia)
- Belachew Yetayew (Ethiopia)
- Michael Bereket (Eritrea)
- (ms) Jane Cherono Jebet (Kenya)
- Frank John Komba (Tanzania)
- Nour Abdi Mohamed (Somalia)
- Ronald Katenya (Uganda)
- (South Sudan) Robert Henry Duwuki Simbe (South Sudan)
- Musa Balikowa (Uganda)

== Group stage ==
=== Group A ===
Pos	Team	Pld	W	D	L	GF	GA	GD	Pts	Qualification
1	Eritrea	3	1	2	0	11	4	+7	5	Advance to knockout stage
2	Sudan	3	1	2	0	9	5	+4	5	Advance to knockout stage
3	Uganda	3	1	2	0	8	4	+4	5	Advance to knockout stage
4	Djibouti	3	0	0	3	1	16	−15	0	

Source: CECAFA
Rules for classification: Group stage tiebreakers
21 September 2019
13:30

Sudan	4–0	Djibouti
Namir 24'; Eljamri 74'; Aboalqassem 78'; Elsiddiq 86' (pen.)

Pece War Memorial Stadium, Gulu
Referee: Eric Manirakiza (Burundi)
21 September 2019
16:00

Uganda	1–1	Eritrea
Bogere 37'	Report	Mewael 57'

Pece War Memorial Stadium, Gulu
Referee: Israel Mpaima (Kenya)

23 September 2019
13:30

Eritrea	3–3	Sudan
Mewael 10'; Teklemichael 55' (pen.); Sulieman 72'	Report	Namir 40'; Siddiq 45+1'; Elfaki 90+2' (pen.)

Pece War Memorial Stadium, Gulu
Referee: Martin Sanya (Tanzania)
23 September 2019
16:00

Djibouti	1–5	Uganda
Elmi 53'		Sserwada 25', 52'; Bogere 43'; Mugulusi 82'; Opiro 86'

Pece War Memorial Stadium, Gulu
Referee: Lemma Nigussi (Ethiopia)

25 September 2019
13:00

Eritrea	7–0	Djibouti
Teklemichael 15'; Sulieman 41'; Mewael 49', 54'; Asmelash 65'; Habte 79'; Jahar 90'	Report

Pece War Memorial Stadium, Gulu
Referee: Eric Manirakiza (Burundi)
25 September 2019
16:00

Uganda	2–2	Sudan
Sserwada 20'; Anukani 63'		Kannou 76'; Namir 89'

Pece War Memorial Stadium, Gulu
Referee: Israel Mpaima (Kenya)

=== Group B ===
Pos	Team	Pld	W	D	L	GF	GA	GD	Pts	Qualification
1	Kenya	3	2	1	0	11	2	+9	7	Advance to knockout stage
2	Tanzania	3	2	1	0	11	2	+9	7	Advance to knockout stage
3	Zanzibar	3	1	0	2	2	11	−9	3	Advance to knockout stage
4	Ethiopia	3	0	0	3	1	10	−9	0	

Source: CECAFA
Rules for classification: Group stage tiebreakers
22 September 2019
16:00

Kenya	5–0	Zanzibar

FUFA Technical Center, Njeru
Referee: Alex Muhabi (Uganda)
22 September 2019
13:00

Ethiopia	0–4	Tanzania

FUFA Technical Center, Njeru
Referee: Mahmood Shantair Ismael (Sudan)

24 September 2019
16:00

Ethiopia	1–2	Zanzibar

FUFA Technical Center, Njeru
Referee: Yonas Zekarias Ghebre (Eritrea)
24 September 2019
13:00

Tanzania	2–2	Kenya

FUFA Technical Center, Njeru
Referee: Dinareh Mohamed Guedi (Djibouti)

26 September 2019
16:00

Zanzibar	0–5	Tanzania

FUFA Technical Center, Njeru
Referee: Mahmood Shantair Ismael (Sudan)
26 September 2019
13:00

Kenya	4–0	Ethiopia

FUFA Technical Center, Njeru
Referee: Ali Mfaume Nassoro (Zanzibar)

=== Group C ===
Pos	Team	Pld	W	D	L	GF	GA	GD	Pts	Qualification
1	South Sudan	2	1	1	0	6	3	+3	4	Advance to knockout stage
2	Burundi	2	1	1	0	5	4	+1	4	Advance to knockout stage
3	Somalia	2	0	0	2	1	5	−4	0	

Source: CECAFA
Rules for classification: Group stage tiebreakers
21 September 2019
16:00

Burundi	3–3	South Sudan

FUFA Technical Center, Njeru
Referee: Ali Mfaume Nassoro (Zanzibar)

23 September 2019
16:00

Somalia	1–2	Burundi

FUFA Technical Center, Njeru
Referee: Jonesia Kabakama Rukyaa (Tanzania)

25 September 2019
16:00

South Sudan	3–0	Somalia

FUFA Technical Center, Njeru
Referee: Alex Muhabi (Uganda)

== Knockout stage ==
=== Quarter-finals ===
29 September 2019
13:00

South Sudan	0–1	Sudan

Pece War Memorial Stadium, Gulu
Referee: Israel Mpaima (Kenya)
29 September 2019
13:00

Kenya	2–1	Burundi

FUFA Technical Center, Njeru
Referee: Mahmood Shantair Ismael (Sudan)
29 September 2019
16:00

Tanzania	4–2	Uganda

Pece War Memorial Stadium, Gulu
Referee: Lemma Nigussi (Ethiopia)
29 September 2019
16:00

Eritrea	5–0	Zanzibar
Mewael; Sulieman; Asmelash	Report

FUFA Technical Center, Njeru
Referee: Dinareh Mohamed Guedi (Djibouti)

=== Semi-finals ===
2 October 2019

Kenya	1–0	Eritrea

FUFA Technical Center, Njeru
Referee: Alex Muhabi (Uganda)
2 October 2019

Sudan	1–2	Tanzania

Pece War Memorial Stadium, Gulu
Referee: Lemma Nigussi (Ethiopia)

=== 3rd Place match ===
5 October 2019

Eritrea	1–0	Sudan
Mengsteab	Report

FUFA Technical Center, Njeru
Referee: Alex Muhabi (Uganda)

=== Finals ===
5 October 2019

Kenya	0–1	Tanzania
		Onyango 46' (o.g.)

FUFA Technical Center, Njeru
Referee: Lemma Nigussi (Ethiopia)

== Champion ==
2019 CECAFA U-20 Championship champion

Tanzania
Second title
