= 2022 CECAFA U-20 Championship =

2022 CECAFA Champions
Tournament details
- Host country: Sudan
- Dates: 28 October – 11 November 2022
- Teams: 7
- Venues: 2

Final positions
- Champions: Uganda (5th title)
- Runners-up: South Sudan
- Third place: Sudan
- Fourth place: Ethiopia

Tournament statistics
- Matches played: 13
- Goals scored: 27 (2.08 per match)
- Top scorer(s): (Burundi) Arthur Nibikora (3 goals)

The 2022 CECAFA U-20 Championship was the 14th edition and was hosted in Sudan. It was scheduled to be played from 28 October to 11 November 2022.

Uganda won previous edition title in 2020 and successfully defended their title.

This competition served as the CECAFA qualifiers for the 2023 Africa U-20 Cup of Nations.

== Venues ==
Al Hilal Stadium in Omdurman

== Teams ==
- Burundi
- Djibouti
- Ethiopia
- South Sudan
- Sudan (Hosts)
- Tanzania
- Uganda

Did not enter

- Eritrea
- Kenya
- Rwanda
- Somalia

== Group stage ==
The draw for the fixtures was held on 11 October 2022.

All times are local, CAT (UTC+2).

The seven teams were drawn into two groups of three and four teams. The winners and the runners-up of each group advanced to the semi-finals.

=== Group A ===
Pos	Team	Pld	W	D	L	GF	GA	GD	Pts	Qualification
1	Sudan (H)	3	2	1	0	2	0	+2	7	Semi-finals
2	South Sudan	3	1	2	0	1	0	+1	5	Semi-finals
3	Burundi	3	1	1	1	5	1	+4	4	
4	Djibouti	3	0	0	3	0	7	−7	0	

Rules for classification: Group tiebreakers
(H) Hosts
28 October 2022
16:00

Djibouti	0–5	Burundi
	Report	Nibikora 62', 77', 82'; Nimbona 63'; Nkurunziza 84'

Al-Hilal Stadium, Omdurman
Referee: William Oloya (Uganda)
28 October 2022
19:00

Sudan	0–0	South Sudan
	Report

Al-Hilal Stadium, Omdurman
Referee: Retselisitsoe Molise (Lesotho)

1 November 2022
16:00

Burundi	0–0	South Sudan
	Report

Al-Hilal Stadium, Omdurman
Referee: Haileyesus Bazezew (Ethiopia)
1 November 2022
19:00

Djibouti	0–1	Sudan
	Report	Toto 23'

Al-Hilal Stadium, Omdurman
Referee: Abdulwahid Huraywidah (Libya)

5 November 2022
16:00

South Sudan	1–0	Djibouti
Loro 80' (pen.)	Report

Kober Stadium, Khartoum
Referee: Retselisitsoe Molise (Lesotho)
5 November 2022
16:00

Burundi	0–1	Sudan
	Report	Omar 75'

Al-Hilal Stadium, Omdurman
Referee: Tuoniféré Soro (Ivory Coast)

=== Group B ===
Pos	Team	Pld	W	D	L	GF	GA	GD	Pts	Qualification
1	Ethiopia	2	1	1	0	3	2	+1	4	Semi-finals
2	Uganda	2	1	0	1	2	1	+1	3	Semi-finals
3	Tanzania	2	0	1	1	2	4	−2	1	

Rules for classification: Group tiebreakers
29 October 2022
18:00

Uganda	2–0	Tanzania
Ssematimba 32'; Mugisha 35'	Report

Al-Hilal Stadium, Omdurman
Referee: Tuoniféré Soro (Ivory Coast)

2 November 2022
18:00

Tanzania	2–2	Ethiopia
Mhilu 20'; Makambo 48'	Report	Tarekegn 31'; Ali 87'

Al-Hilal Stadium, Omdurman
Referee: Thierry Nkurunziza (Burundi)

5 November 2022
19:00

Ethiopia	1–0	Uganda
Ali 60'	Report

Al-Hilal Stadium, Omdurman
Referee: Abdalaziz Estalgoo (Sudan)

== Knockout stage ==
Semi-finals
8 November – Al-Hilal Stadium
Ethiopia	2 (2)
South Sudan (p)	2 (4)
8 November – Kober Stadium
Sudan	0
Uganda	2

Final
11 November – Al-Hilal Stadium
South Sudan	1
Uganda	2
Third place
11 November – Al-Hilal Stadium
Ethiopia	1
Sudan	2

=== Semi-finals ===
Winners qualified for 2023 Africa U-20 Cup of Nations.

8 November 2022
20:00

Sudan	0–2	Uganda
	Report	Torach 56'; Mugulusi 71'

Kober Stadium, Khartoum
Referee: Saddam Mansour (Djibouti)
8 November 2022
20:00

Ethiopia	2–2 (a.e.t.)	South Sudan
Tarekegn 9' (pen.); Abate 107'	Report	Loro 18' (pen.); Felix 111'
Penalties
Wabela (penalty scored); Abate (penalty missed); Shamena (penalty missed); Dawit (penalty scored)	2–4	(penalty scored) Talafun; (penalty missed) Lual; (penalty scored) Lukciir; (penalty scored) Loro; (penalty scored) Sebit

Al-Hilal Stadium, Omdurman
Referee: Abdulwahid Huraywidah (Libya)

==== Third place ====
11 November 2022
16:00

Ethiopia	1–2	Sudan
Gezahegn 56'	Report	Legese 38' (o.g.); Ali 62'

Al-Hilal Stadium, Omdurman
Referee: William Oloya (Uganda)

==== Final ====
11 November 2022
19:30

South Sudan	1–2	Uganda
Felix 15'	Report	Bugembe 22'; Ssematimba 62'

Al-Hilal Stadium, Omdurman
Referee: Abdalaziz Estalgoo (Sudan)

== Qualification for CAF U20 Cup of Nations ==
The two finalists of the tournament qualified for the 2023 Africa U-20 Cup of Nations.

Qualified nations:

- South Sudan
- Uganda

== Goalscorers ==
There were 27 goals scored in 13 matches, for an average of 2.08 goals per match.

3 goals

- (Burundi) Arthur Nibikora

2 goals

- (Ethiopia) Kedir Ali
- (Ethiopia) Yosef Tarekegn
- (South Sudan) Agumemboki Felix
- (South Sudan) Joseph Loro
- (Uganda) Titus Ssematimba

1 goal

- (Burundi) Kessy-Jordan Nimbona
- (Burundi) Alfred Nkurunziza
- (Ethiopia) Zelalem Abate
- (Ethiopia) Wegene Gezahegn
- (Sudan) Musa Ali
- (Sudan) Abdelsamat Omar
- (Sudan) Zeher Toto
- (Tanzania) Athumani Makambo
- (Tanzania) Dickson Mhilu
- (Uganda) Issa Bugembe
- (Uganda) Rogers Mugisha
- (Uganda) Isma Mugulusi
- (Uganda) Rogers Torach

1 own goal

- (Ethiopia) Eyasu Legese (against Sudan)
