= 2010 CECAFA U-20 Championship =

Tournament details
- Host country: Eritrea
- City: Asmara
- Dates: 14–28 August
- Teams: 9

Final positions
- Champions: Uganda
- Runners-up: Eritrea
- Third place: Kenya
- Fourth place: Rwanda

Tournament statistics
- Matches played: 20
- Goals scored: 51 (2.55 per match)

The 2010 CECAFA U-20 Championship is an association football competition that was held between 14 and 28 August 2010. Eritrea hosted the tournament for the first time in the country's history.

== Participants ==
=== Group A ===
- Eritrea
- Tanzania
- Somalia
- Sudan
- Kenya

=== Group B ===
- Uganda
- Rwanda
- Yemen
- Zanzibar

== Fixtures ==
=== Group stage ===
==== Group A ====
Pos	Team	Pld	W	D	L	GF	GA	GD	Pts	Qualification
1	Eritrea (H)	4	3	1	0	5	2	+3	10	Semi-finals
2	Kenya	4	2	1	1	11	4	+7	7	Semi-finals
3	Tanzania	4	1	1	2	3	5	−2	4	
4	Sudan	4	0	3	1	3	4	−1	3	
5	Somalia	4	0	2	2	2	9	−7	2	

Rules for classification: Group tiebreakers
(H) Hosts
14 August 2010
6:00 PM

Eritrea	1–0	Tanzania
Tendros 44' (pen.)

Asmara
15 August 2010
4:00 PM

Somalia	0–0	Sudan

Asmara
17 August 2010
2:00 PM

Tanzania	1–1	Somalia
Abdul 37'		Kasim 55'

Asmara
17 August 2010
4:00 PM

Sudan	2–2	Kenya
Abdel 43'; Eltayib 90+2'		Keli 33'; Muigai 85'

Asmara
19 August 2010
2:00 PM

Somalia	0–6	Kenya
		Owiti 6'; Muigai 38', 70'; Arita 67', 90'; Were 81'

Asmara
19 August 2010
4:00 PM

Sudan	1–1	Eritrea
Ishaq 38'		Tendros 47' (pen.)

Asmara
21 August 2010
2:00 PM

Tanzania	1–3	Kenya
Ally 83'		Keli 13'; Were 27'; Mutiso

Asmara
21 August 2010
4:00 PM

Eritrea	2–1	Somalia
Tekele 63'; Tendros 77'		Bader 88' (pen.)

Asmara
23 August 2010
2:00 PM

Sudan	0–1	Tanzania
		Jerome 49'

Asmara
23 August 2010
4:00 PM

Kenya	0–1	Eritrea
		Hebteslus 58'

Asmara

==== Group B ====
Pos	Team	Pld	W	D	L	GF	GA	GD	Pts	Qualification
1	Uganda	3	3	0	0	9	5	+4	9	Semi-finals
2	Rwanda	3	1	1	1	3	4	−1	4	Semi-finals
3	Yemen	3	1	0	2	3	5	−2	3	
4	Zanzibar	3	0	1	2	3	2	+1	1	

Rules for classification: Group tiebreakers
- NOTE: Zanzibar win over Yemen was forfeited as a result of over age player.
15 August 2010
2:00 PM

Yemen	1–2	Zanzibar
Al Hagri 57'		Badri 7'; Osman 24'

Asmara
16 August 2010
4:00 PM

Uganda	3–1	Rwanda
Sserenkuma 18'; 38'; 90+2'		Bayisenge 85'

Asmara
18 August 2010
2:00 PM

Zanzibar	1–1	Rwanda
Kamanya 45' (pen.)		Ahmed 35' (o.g.)

Asmara
18 August 2010
4:00 PM

Uganda	3–2	Yemen
Bukenya 12'; Edema 79'; Juma 82'		Woraji 21'; Tawfik 72'

Asmara
20 August 2010
2:00 PM

Rwanda	1–0	Yemen
Usegimana 61'

Asmara
20 August 2010
4:00 PM

Zanzibar	2–3	Uganda
Kamanya 9', 14'		Sserunkuma 7'; Ngobi 41'; Bukenya 80'

Asmara

=== Semi final ===
24 August 2010
4:00 PM

Eritrea	1–0	Rwanda
Tendros 75' (pen.)

Asmara
26 August 2010
4:00 PM

Uganda	2–1	Kenya

Asmara

=== Third place playoff ===
28 August 2010

Rwanda	0–1	Kenya

Asmara

=== Final ===
29 August 2010

Eritrea	1–1	Uganda
Penalties
	3–5

Asmara
