= Ali Sulieman =

Eritrean footballer (born 2000)

Personal information
- Full name: Ali Suleiman Ibrahim
- Date of birth: 12 September 2000 (age 26)
- Place of birth: Jeddah, Saudi Arabia
- Height: 1.68 m (5 ft 6 in)
- Position: Forward

Team information
- Current team: Al Masry

Senior career*
Years	Team	Apps	(Gls)
2016–2021	Red Sea		
2021–2022	Bahir Dar Kenema	26	(5)
2022–2025	Hawassa City	91	(47)
2025– 2026	Kahraba Ismailia	31	(11)
2026–	Al Masry	0	(0)

International career^{‡}
2019	Eritrea U20	6	(4)
2019–	Eritrea	15	(7)
- * Club domestic league appearances and goals as of 04:45, 16 August 2026 (UTC) ‡ National team caps and goals as of 19:00, 16 November 2026 (UTC)

Ali Sulieman Ibrahim (Tigrinya: ዓሊ ሱሌማን ኢብራሂም; born 12 September 2000) is a professional footballer who plays as a forward for Egyptian Premier League club Al Masry. Born in Saudi Arabia, he plays for the Eritrea national team.

As of 2026, he is Eritrea's all-time top goalscorer with seven goals.

== Early life ==
Sulieman was born in Jeddah, Saudi Arabia, and returned to Eritrea with his family when he was four months old.

== Club career ==
=== Red Sea ===
Domestically Sulieman played for Red Sea of the Eritrean Premier League. He was spotted by the club at age 16 when he was competing in a zonal tournament in Asmara. He joined the club which was competing with at least three others to sign the striker. He was top scorer in the Premier League two times.

=== Bahir Dar Kenema ===
In July 2021 he joined Ethiopian Premier League club Bahir Dar Kenema on a two-year deal, becoming the second Eritrean player in the league, along with Robel Teklemichael. The player was spotted by the club in Eritrea's matches against Ethiopia in the 2021 CECAFA U-23 Challenge Cup held in Bahir Dar. Sulieman made his competitive debut for the club on 27 September 2021 in a 3–0 victory over Adama City in the 2021 Addis Ababa City Cup. He was named Man of the Match for his performance which included his first goal and assist for the club. Three days later he was injured in a victory over Jimma Aba Jifar which saw Bahir Dar reach the final of the tournament. He was expected to miss the final match as he was to be sidelined at least twenty days. During the 2021–22 season he made twenty six league appearances, scoring five goals.

=== Hawassa City ===
In July 2022 at the conclusion of the season, it was announced that Suleiman had signed for fellow Ethiopian Premier League club Hawassa City. Suleiman was the league's top scorer for the 2023–24 season with twenty goals. He was the league's scoring champion again the following season with nineteen goals. During his time with Hawassa City, the player had unsuccessful trials with a club in Sweden before returning to Ethiopia.

=== Kahraba Ismailia ===
After back-to-back scoring titles in Ethiopia, Sulieman joined Egyptian Premier League club Kahraba Ismailia on a two-year deal beginning with the 2025–26 season. With the deal, he became the first Eritrean player to sign for a club in Egypt's top division.

=== Al Masry ===
Sulieman joined Al Masry in August 2026.

== International career ==
Sulieman made his senior international debut on 4 September 2019 in a 2022 FIFA World Cup qualification match against Namibia. He also scored his first goal in the eventual 2–1 defeat. Later that month he was part of Eritrea’s squad for the 2019 CECAFA U-20 Championship. He scored in Group Stage matches against Sudan and Djibouti. He added a brace against Zanzibar in the quarter-finals as part of the 5–0 victory. Eritrea went on to win the bronze medal in the tournament.

In July 2021 he was part of Eritrea's squad that competed at the 2021 CECAFA U-23 Challenge Cup. He scored a hat-trick in the nation's opening match against Ethiopia, earning a 3–3 draw. He later scored in a 1–1 rematch draw against Ethiopia in the classification round. His second-half goal forced penalty kicks, during which Sulieman converted as Eritrea eventually won the match. Following the tournament he received the top scorer award with four goals.

== Career statistics ==
=== Club ===
As of 3 June 2026

Appearances and goals by club, season and competition
Club	Season	League			National Cup (Note: Includes Egypt Cup)		League Cup (Note: Includes Egyptian League Cup)		Continental		Other		Total	
Club	Season	Division	Apps	Goals	Apps	Goals	Apps	Goals	Apps	Goals	Apps	Goals	Apps	Goals
Bahir Dar Kenema	2021–22	Ethiopian Premier League	26	5	—		—		—		—		26	5
Hawassa City	2022–23	Ethiopian Premier League	29	6	?	?	—		—		—		29	6
Hawassa City	2023–24	Ethiopian Premier League	29	20	?	?	—		—		—		29	20
Hawassa City	2024–25	Ethiopian Premier League	33	21	?	?	—		—		—		33	21
Hawassa City	Total Hawassa City		91	47	0	0	0	0	0	0	0	0	91	47
Kahraba Ismailia	2025–26	Egyptian Premier League	31	11	1	0	6	5	—		—		38	16
Al Masry	2026–27	Egyptian Premier League	0	0	0	0	0	0	—		—		0	0
Career total			148	63	1	0	6	5	0	0	0	0	155	68

=== International ===
As of match played 16 November 2026

Appearances and goals by year
Year	Competitive		Friendly		Total	
Year	Apps	Goals	Apps	Goals	Apps	Goals
2019	8	3	0	0	8	3
2020	0	0	1	0	1	0
2026	6	4	0	0	6	4
Total	14	7	1	0	15	7
