= Northern Cyprus national football team results =

This article provides details of international football games played by the Northern Cyprus national football team.

== Results ==
Key
| Win |
| Draw |
| Defeat |

=== 2005 ===
| 2 November 2005 KTFF 50th Anniversary Cup | Northern Cyprus | 1–0 | Kosovo | Nicosia, Northern Cyprus |
| | Tarik 57' | NFT Report; RSSSF Report | | Stadium: Atatürk Stadium; Referee: Mehmet Malek (Northern Cyprus) |

| 4 November 2005 KTFF 50th Anniversary Cup | Northern Cyprus | 6–2 | Sápmi | Nicosia, Northern Cyprus |
| | Yasin 12', 35', 50'; Uçaner 83', 90+3'; Ugur 88' | Report | Anders 15'; Johanssen 59' | Stadium: Atatürk Stadium; Referee: Bengü Topaloğlu (Northern Cyprus) |

=== 2006 ===
| 29 May 2006 FIFI WC GS | Northern Cyprus | 1–0 | Greenland | Hamburg, Germany |
| | Ali Oraloğlu 55' | | | Stadium: Millerntor-Stadion; Referee: Tobias Mayer (Germany) |

| 30 May 2006 FIFI WC GS | Northern Cyprus | 3–1 | Zanzibar | Hamburg, Germany |
| | Agrey Morris 12' (o.g.); Derviş Kolcu 20' (pen.); Çagan Cerkez 60' | | Salum Ussi 43' | Stadium: Millerntor-Stadion; Referee: Peter Postel (Germany) |

| 1 June 2006 FIFI WC SF | Northern Cyprus | 2–0 | Gibraltar | Hamburg, Germany |
| | Ali Oraloğlu 39'; Dylan 90' (o.g.) | | | Stadium: Millerntor-Stadion; Referee: Markus Dahmas (Germany) |

| 3 June 2006 FIFI WC F | Northern Cyprus | 0–0 (4–1 p) | Zanzibar | Hamburg, Germany |
| | | | | Stadium: Millerntor-Stadion; Referee: Moritz Hermann (Germany) |

| 19 November 2006 ELF Cup GS | Crimean Tatars | 0–5 | Northern Cyprus | Nicosia, Northern Cyprus |
| 18:30 EET | | Report | Çakır 16'; Taşkıran 45'; Ablitarov 65' (o.g.); Uçaner 78'; Keleşzade 87' | Stadium: Atatürk Stadium; Referee: Mehmet Malek (TRNC) |

| 20 November 2006 ELF Cup GS | Northern Cyprus | 5–1 | Tajikistan | Morphou, Northern Cyprus |
| 14:00 EET | Kolcu 34', 54'; Uçaner 65', 90+1'; Ulusoy 71' | Report | Aknazarov 12' | Stadium: Zafer Stadium; Referee: Serkan Şimşek (TRNC) |

| 21 November 2006 ELF Cup GS | Northern Cyprus | 10–0 | Tibet | Famagusta, Northern Cyprus |
| 14:00 EET | Çakır 13', 30', 37'; Çukurovalı 14', 24', 43'; Selden 17', 29'; Arıkbuka 54'; Kansu 77' | Report | | Stadium: Mağusa Dr. Fazıl Küçük Stadium; Referee: Ramadan Göktan (TRNC) |

| 23 November 2006 ELF Cup SF | Northern Cyprus | 5–0 | Zanzibar | Nicosia, Northern Cyprus |
| 17:00 EET | Taşkıran 24', 34', 47', 83'; Ulusoy 59' | Report | | Stadium: Atatürk Stadium; Referee: Savaş Tilki (TRNC) |

| 25 November 2006 ELF Cup F | Northern Cyprus | 3–1 | Crimean Tatars | Nicosia, Northern Cyprus |
| 16:30 EET | Çakır 1'; Sapsızoğlu 46'; Taşkıran 55' | Report | Akimov 90+3' | Stadium: Atatürk Stadium |

=== 2012 ===
| 4 June 2012 2012 VIVA WC GS | Northern Cyprus | 15–0 | Darfur | Arbil, Iraqi Kurdistan |
| 17:00 AST | Turan 11', 17', 23', 44', 50', 90'; Çıdamlı 14', 76', 81'; Börekçi 21'; Kayalilar 34'; Güvensoy 46', 61', 63'; Yaşinses 87' | Report | | Stadium: Brayati Stadium |

| 6 June 2012 2012 VIVA WC GS | Provence | 2–1 | Northern Cyprus | Arbil, Iraqi Kurdistan |
| 23:30 AST | Zenafi 28'; Lescoualch 35' | | Tağman 26' | Stadium: Franso Hariri Stadium |

| 8 June 2012 2012 VIVA WC SF | Zanzibar | 0–2 | Northern Cyprus | Duhok, Iraqi Kurdistan |
| 20:15 AST | | Report | Yaşinses 58'; Kayalilar 69' (pen.) | Stadium: Duhok Stadium |

| 9 June 2012 2012 VIVA WC F | Kurdistan Region | 2–1 | Northern Cyprus | Arbil, Iraqi Kurdistan |
| 19:00 AST | Halgurd 9' (pen.); Siamand 32' | Report | Mohamad 42' (o.g.) | Stadium: Franso Hariri Stadium; Attendance: 22,000 |

=== 2016 ===
| 29 May 2016 2016 CONIFA WC GS | Padania | 1–2 | Northern Cyprus | Gagra, Abkhazia |
| 11:00 GET | Matteo Prandelli 48' | Report | Ünal Kaya 62'; Halil Turan 67' | Stadium: Daur Akhvlediani Stadium |

| 31 May 2016 2016 CONIFA WC GS | Northern Cyprus | 7–0 | Raetia | Gagra, Abkhazia |
| 11:00 GET | Esin Sonay 5', 13', 48'; Tansel Ekingen 60'; Hüseyin Sadiklar 73'; Halil Turan 81', 87' | Report | | Stadium: Daur Akhvlediani Stadium; Referee: Roger Lundback |

| 1 June 2016 2016 CONIFA WC QF | United Koreans in Japan | 1–1 (2–4 p) | Northern Cyprus | Sukhumi, Abkhazia |
| 15:00 GET | On Song-tae 54' | Report | Ünal Kaya 31' | Stadium: Dinamo Stadium; Referee: Dmitry Zhukov |
| | Penalties |
| | Kim Kwang-woo (penalty missed); On Song-tae (penalty scored); Kim Su-yong (penalty scored); An Suug-tae (penalty missed) | | (penalty scored) Esin Sonay; (penalty scored) Halil Turan; (penalty scored) Ünal Kaya; (penalty scored) Ibrahim Çıdamlı |

| 4 June 2016 2016 CONIFA WC SF | Northern Cyprus | 0–2 | Abkhazia | Sukhumi, Abkhazia |
| 20:00 GET | | Report | Levan Logua 9'; Ruslan Shoniya 69' | Stadium: Dinamo Stadium; Referee: Dimitri Zhukov |

| 5 June 2016 2016 CONIFA WC 3rd | Padania | 0–2 | Northern Cyprus | Sukhumi, Abkhazia |
| 15:00 GET | | Report | Halil Turan 50'; Tansel Ekingen 79' | Stadium: Dinamo Stadium; Referee: Amar Amirkhayan |

=== 2017 ===
| 4 June 2017 2017 CONIFA EC GS | Northern Cyprus | 1–0 | Kárpátalja | Nicosia, Northern Cyprus |
| 20:00 EEST | Yaşınses 89' | Report | | Stadium: Atatürk Stadium; Referee: Dimitrii Zhubov |

| 6 June 2017 2017 CONIFA EC GS | South Ossetia | 0–8 | Northern Cyprus | Kyrenia, Northern Cyprus |
| 20:00 EEST | | Report | Yaşınses 13'; Taşkıran 15', 20', 58'; Çıdamlı 57', 68'; Turan 62' (pen.); Gök 88' | Stadium: Mete Adanır Stadium; Referee: James Turpin |

| 7 June 2017 2017 CONIFA EC GS | Northern Cyprus | 0–0 | Abkhazia | Morphou, Northern Cyprus |
| 20:00 EEST | | Report | | Stadium: Üner Berkalp Stadium |

| 9 June 2017 2017 CONIFA EC SF | Northern Cyprus | 2–1 | Székely Land | Nicosia, Northern Cyprus |
| 20:00 EEST | Onet 16'; Turan 83' | Report | Silion 49' | Stadium: Atatürk Stadium; Referee: Dimitrii Zhukov |

| 10 June 2017 2017 CONIFA EC F | Padania | 1–1 (4–2 p) | Northern Cyprus | Nicosia, Northern Cyprus |
| 20:00 EEST | Pllumbaj 23' | Report | Turan 52' | Stadium: Atatürk Stadium; Referee: Fejis Tilmon |

=== 2018 ===
| 31 May 2018 2018 CONIFA WC GS | Northern Cyprus | 1–1 | Kárpátalja | Enfield, England |
| 15:00 BST | Mehmet 13' | Report | I. Sándor 53' | Stadium: Queen Elizabeth II Stadium |

| 2 June 2018 2018 CONIFA WC GS | Northern Cyprus | 3–1 | Tibet | Enfield, England |
| 17:00 BST | Turan 2', 67'; Gök 73' | Report | Topgyal 38' | Stadium: Queen Elizabeth II Stadium; Referee: John McCallum |

| 3 June 2018 2018 CONIFA WC GS | Abkhazia | 2–2 | Northern Cyprus | Enfield, England |
| 15:00 BST | Maskayev 21'; Argun 90' (pen.) | Report | Kaya 27'; Oshan 77' | Stadium: Queen Elizabeth II Stadium; Referee: Dmitrii Zhukov |

| 5 June 2018 2018 CONIFA WC QF | Barawa | 0–8 | Northern Cyprus | Sutton, England |
| 15:00 BST | | Report | Gök 15', 80'; Önet 51'; Turan 54', 69'; Ali 58' (o.g.); Mehmet 84'; Osman 88' | Stadium: Gander Green Lane; Referee: Ivan Mrki |

| 7 June 2018 2018 CONIFA WC SF | Northern Cyprus | 3–2 | Padania | Carshalton, England |
| 17:00 BST | Mehmet 36', 84'; Turan 80' | Report | Ravasi 30'; Pavan 47' | Stadium: Colston Avenue; Referee: Dmitrii Zhukov |

| 9 June 2018 2018 CONIFA WC F | Northern Cyprus | 0–0 (2–3 p) | Kárpátalja | Enfield, England |
| 18:00 BST | | Report | | Stadium: Queen Elizabeth II Stadium; Referee: Mark Clattenburg |
| | Penalties |
| | Mehmet (penalty missed); Kurt (penalty missed); Oshan (penalty scored); Ersalan (penalty scored); Turan (penalty missed) | | (penalty scored) Gyürki; (penalty scored) Toma; (penalty missed) Baksa; (penalty missed) I. Sándor; (penalty scored) Svedjuk |

=== 2026 ===
| 3 June 2026 2026 CONIFA EC GS | Canton Ticino | 1–5 | Northern Cyprus | Carate Brianza, Italy |
| 17:30 CEST | Moccetti 88' (pen.) | | Şöför 44', 46'; Sezer 48'; Güçlucan 63'; Oshan 87' | Stadium: Verano Stadium |

| 4 June 2026 2026 CONIFA EC GS | Rouet-Provence | 0–4 | Northern Cyprus | Carate Brianza, Italy |
| 17:30 CEST | | | | Stadium: Verano Stadium |

| 6 June 2026 2026 CONIFA EC F | Padania | 1–6 | Northern Cyprus | Carate Brianza, Italy |
| 18:30 CEST | Cristian 28' | | Şöför 31'; Öztümer 32', 40', 49', 54'; Çalban 90' | Stadium: Verano Stadium |
