= Ivan Bukenya =

Ugandan footballer (born 1991)

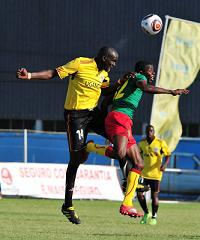
- Bukenya (in yellow) with Uganda in 2011

Personal information
- Full name: Ivan Bukenya
- Date of birth: 1 November 1991 (age 35)
- Place of birth: Kampala, Uganda
- Height: 1.92 m (6 ft 3 1/2 in)
- Positions: Centre back; midfielder

Senior career*
Years	Team	Apps	(Gls)
2009–2010	Nalubaale		
2010–2011	Proline	8	(3)
2011–2013	Arbil SC	32	(5)
2013–2016	Kaizer Chiefs	37	(7)
2016–2017	East Bengal	21	(3)
2017–2018	Proline		
2018	Linköping City	23	(2)

International career^{‡}
2010–	Uganda	8	(1)
- * Club domestic league appearances and goals as of 1 December 2018 ‡ National team caps and goals as of 2 October 2013

Ivan Bukenya (born 1 November 1991) is a Ugandan professional footballer. Bukenya has formerly played for FC Linkoping City, Erbil FC in Iraq, Kaizer Chiefs in South Africa and East Bengal FC in India.

== Club career ==
Bukenya began his football journey in July 2007 during the visit of Rio Ferdinand. He was playing for a Coca-Cola select youth side coached by Mike Mutebi with the likes of Ibrahim Juma, Andrew Buteera and Dennis Guma where they played against Proline FC youngsters. Being on the Coca-Cola side was a vindication of a burgeoning star that was Bukenya and he eventually signed for the Ugandan Super League club. Ferdinand was impressed enough by the talent on show to work on the Proline Academy, which Bukenya was now part of travelling to England and play games against the academy sides of Manchester United and West Ham United in October of that year. He scored regularly in the Ugandan Super League and was highlighted as an aerial threat during corner-kicks and free-kicks for Proline FC. Bukenya's game reading and ability to move the ball on the overlap was arguably one of his greatest strengths in Mujib Kasule's team, where he broke through.

=== Arbil SC ===
Ivan Bukenya played for the Iraqi club Arbil SC in Arbil in the Iraq elite league where he reached the 2012 AFC Cup final against Al Kuwait and helped win the 2011–12 Iraqi Premier League. On 14 February 2013 Bukenya scored the winning goal in a 0–1 away win against Al-Zawraa at the Al-Shaab Stadium in Baghdad. On 5 March 2013 he scored the second goal in a 4–0 home win in the 2013 AFC Cup group stage game against Al-Ahli Taizz S.C. from Yemen. Bukenya continued his scoring record against the same team on 24 April 2013 when he scored the fourth and final goal in another 0–4 route. On 27 June 2013 he took part in and scored the fourth goal in the biggest home win and highest-scoring game of the 2012–13 Iraqi Premier League season when they beat Al-Mina'a SC 8–1 at the Franso Hariri Stadium.

=== Kaizer Chiefs ===
Bukenya began training with South African Premier Soccer League team Kaizer Chiefs on 12 September 2013 and he signed a 2-year deal with the club on 30 September 2013 after impressing coach Stuart Baxter and the technical team. He is the second Ugandan after David Obua to sign for the South African giants. On 13 October 2013 Bukenya made his debut in the Macufe Cup against Bloemfontein Celtic in a packed Free State Stadium. The Chiefs lost the game 1–0 with Bukenya playing the full 90 minutes and impressing Amakhosi fans as well as the coach. On 4 December 2013 Bukenya came on as a late substitute at Charles Mopeli Stadium to make his PSL debut in a 0–2 win over Free State Stars. On 8 March 2014 Bukenya played the full 90 minutes of the 2014 CAF Champions League first-round game that saw his team beat Liga Muçulmana de Maputo of Mozambique 3–0 in the 2nd leg. Bukenya tasted his first Soweto derby on 15 March 2014 as the Amakhosi won 1–0 in a League clash at Soccer City. He scored his first goal for Chiefs on 26 March 2014 in the Nedbank Cup last 16 in 2–1 win over FC Buffalo. He said "I feel good...I feel motivated and hope to improve on the missed chances in future. It is about teamwork and the coaches planning. It is all about the right training...this is good but it is not my best.". On 10 May 2014 Bukenya was voted Absa Premiership Man of the Match as Kaizer Chiefs beat AmaZulu F.C. 3–0 in the final game of the season. On 19 October 2014 bukenya played in the 0–1 win over Ajax Cape Town to set a new South African Premier League (PSL) record of 15 successive wins.

=== East Bengal ===
Bukenya signed I-League team East Bengal on 28 November 2016.

Bukenya was offloaded by Chiefs in June 2016 after a difficult stay which brought him a mere 22 starts in close to three years.

After his release from Naturena the defender-cum-midfielder headed back home to Uganda where he trained with his former club Proline FC before switching to Bengal in December.

With the I-League a game away from the halfway stage, Bukenya played a key role in helping Bengal to the top of the standings and is one of just five players to have played all games.

He scored thrice playing as a central defender in the I-League, which runs until May before making way for the Indian Super League.

=== Linköping City ===
In April 2018, Bukenya signed a contract for the rest of 2018 with Swedish Division 1 club FC Linköping City. Bukenya was close to a perfect debut as FC Linköping City premiere played against Nyköping BIS in Division 1 North. The match ended 1–1 after City got a cannon shot when the new acquisition of Ivan Bukenya after 15 minutes knocked 1-0 into a well-frustrated free kick by Ilir Terbunja, who completely dismissed Bukenya in the area of the penalty area.

"A nice feeling to get your ball, it's always fun to score, but the most important thing is that the team is performing," Bukenya said after the match.

He was released by FC Linköping City in December 2018.

== International career ==
He has represented Uganda at all junior levels and is a current senior national team player. Bukenya was part of the successful Uganda U20 side that finished as winners of the 2010 CECAFA U-20 Championship beating the host nation Eritrea U20 in the final after they beat local rivals Kenya U20 2–1 in the semi-final. Bukenya was also part of the Uganda U23 side that hammered Tanzania's U23 team 5–2 on aggregate and thrashed Kenya's U23 team 5–1 in the first leg en route to qualifying for the 2011 All-Africa Games held in Maputo, Mozambique. After a fine season with Proline FC he was rewarded with selection by Bobby Williamson to take part in the 2011 African Nations Championship held in Sudan where he played every game at the heart of the defence. on 1 June 2013 he played in the 3–0 loss to Libya in Tripoli which was also the first test for newly appointed coach Milutin Sredojević as they prepared to host Liberia on 8 June in a crucial 2014 FIFA World Cup qualification game.

== Style of play ==
When he completed his move, Kaizer Chiefs and South Africa captain Itumeleng Khune said "He is a very good player; the height, the physique and he is quick. He is a complete player, but all I can say is wait for Macufe and you will see what he has in store for us".

== Personal life ==
Bukenya was born to Fred Yiga, a renowned civil servant at the Kampala City Council (KCC) and Justine Nantume. His mother was a tennis player in her youth and it was her inspiration and funding of youth football tournaments around her home area that encouraged Bukenya to become a top professional. Youth coach Moses Kibirango said "When a parent like Bukenya's mother shows much interest in her son's development as a footballer, it makes it easy for a coach to work with the player". After her death in 2010 he contemplated quitting game.

== Honours ==
2014–15

=== Club ===
Kaizer Chiefs

Absa Premier League

Champion(1):2014-2015

MTN 8(1):2014

Macufe Cup:

Carling Black Label Cup(1) 2013

Arbil SC

- Iraqi Premier League:

Champion (1): 2011–12.
Runner-up (1): 2012–13

- AFC Cup:

2012: Runner-up
2013: Round of 16
.Proline Fc
Most Valuable Player (MVP):2011-2012

=== Country ===
Uganda-U20

- CECAFA U-20 Championship: 2010

== See also ==
- Itumeleng Khune
- David Obua
- Stuart Baxter
