= Sofiane Khayat =

Footballer (born 1999)

Personal information
- Date of birth: 5 May 1999 (age 27)
- Place of birth: Marseille, France
- Height: 1.73 m (5 ft 8 in)
- Position: Midfielder

Team information
- Current team: Mondercange
- Number: 18

Youth career
- 2014–2017: Nancy

Senior career*
Years	Team	Apps	(Gls)
2016–2020	Nancy B	30	(6)
2017–2020	Nancy	2	(0)
2020–	Stade Tunisien	1	(0)
2023–	Mondercange	4	(0)

International career
2016	Tunisia U20	1	(0)
- * Club domestic league appearances and goals as of 1 June 2024

Sofiane Khayat (born 5 May 1999) is a professional footballer, who plays for Mondercange as a midfielder. Born in France, Khayat is a youth international for Tunisia.

== Club career ==
Khayat joined AS Nancy in 2014, joining from Marseille. He made his professional debut with Nancy in a 1–0 Ligue 2 loss to Paris FC on 15 December 2017.

On 1 February 2020, Khayat joined Stade Tunisien in Tunisia.

== International career ==
Khayat was called up to the Tunisia U20s for 2017 Africa U-20 Cup of Nations qualification matches against the Senegal U20s on 4 May 2017. He made his debut for the Tunisia U20s in a 2–0 loss to the Senegal U20s on 11 June 2016.
