= Ibrahim Juma (footballer) =

Ugandan footballer (born 1993)

Ibrahim Sadam Juma
Personal information
- Full name: Ibrahim Sadam Juma
- Date of birth: 1 October 1993 (age 33)
- Place of birth: Kampala, Uganda
- Height: 1.82 m (5 ft 11 1/2 in)
- Position: Midfielder

Team information
- Current team: KCCA FC
- Number: 15

Senior career*
Years	Team	Apps	(Gls)
2009	Cray Wanderers	4	(0)
2009–2011	Bunamwaya		
2011–	Sài Gòn Xuân Thành		
2014–	Vipers SC		
2016–	Express FC		
2017– 2020	Kampala Capital City Authority FC		

International career^{‡}
2010–	Uganda	12	(3)
- * Club domestic league appearances and goals as of 9 September 2011 ‡ National team caps and goals as of 18 December 2017

Ibrahim Sadam Juma (born 1 October 1993) is a Ugandan professional footballer who recently played midfielder for Uganda Premier League KCCA FC. He is known for his creativity, range of passing and finishing, he is also a free kick specialist. Juma has been capped by Uganda at international level.

== Club career ==
=== Early years ===
During his youth, Juma played for Kampala Kids League. He was a key player in the team that won Tivoli Cup and Gothia Cup in 2003 – he scored 25 goals in 13 matches during the latter competition – and the Tivoli Cup again the following year. He helped the team win the Tivoli Cup again – their seventh title overall – in 2008 when they defeated Danish side Hillerod 6–0 in the final.

=== Cray Wanderers ===
Juma began his senior career with Isthmian League club Cray Wanderers. After impressive performances for the reserve Juma was called to first team and eventually made his debut against Corinthian Casuals. Juma's most important contribution to Cray Wanderers was winning the free kick which was scored by Simon Osborn which resulted in Cray Wanderers winning the playoffs and therefore getting promoted. Juma went on to play only 4 times for Cray Wanderers.

=== Bunamwaya ===
In 2009 Juma joined Ugandan Super League club Bunamwaya. He scored in a 3–0 win against Simba on 12 November, and was the focal point of the team in a match against Express on 5 February 2010 as Bunamwaya came from three goals down to claim a 3–3 draw. Edward Golola, the club's manager, said that Juma's imagination had breathed life into Bunamwaya and winning the league wasn't a far-fetched thought. "He plays with a lot of maturity," said team-mate Ayub Kisalita. "One thing he has added to the team is his ability to unlock defences with his sublime passes. Then he gets into scoring positions and takes his chances so expertly." The 2009–10 season finished with Bunamwaya winning their first league title. The following season was less successful for both Juma and the club. He scored vital goals in matches against Proline and Maroons, but he was hampered by injuries. The club were unable to retain the title, finishing third and 12 points behind the champions Uganda Revenue Authority.

=== Sài Gòn Xuân Thành ===
Juma joined Vietnamese First Division club Sài Gòn Xuân Thành in June 2011. His four goals scored in July and August helped the club win the title and promotion to the V-League.

== International career ==
Juma represented Uganda at youth level before being called up to the senior team. He helped his country retain the CECAFA U-20 Championship in 2010. Juma gave Uganda the lead in the final against Eritrea before the hosts equalised to take the match to extra time and then penalties, which Uganda won 5–4. He made his debut for the senior team against Tanzania on 2 March 2010 and scored their second goal in a 3–2 win. Juma took part in the 2011 African Nations Championship in Sudan, which features teams made up exclusively of players who compete in their countries' domestic leagues and was not recognised by FIFA as a full international tournament.

=== International goals ===
Scores and results list Uganda's goal tally first.

No	Date	Venue	Opponent	Score	Result	Competition
1.	3 March 2010	CCM Kirumba Stadium, Mwanza, Tanzania	Tanzania	2–2	3–2	Friendly
2.	17 December 2017	Kenyatta Stadium, Machakos, Kenya	Burundi	1–1	2–1	2017 CECAFA Cup
3.	17 December 2017	Kenyatta Stadium, Machakos, Kenya	Burundi	2–1	2–1	2017 CECAFA Cup

== Personal life ==
He grew up in Luzira, a suburb of Kampala.
