= Patrick Edema =

Ugandan footballer (born 1992)

Personal information
- Full name: Patrick Lechi Edema
- Date of birth: 27 August 1992 (age 34)
- Place of birth: Nsambya, Uganda
- Height: 1.79 m (5 ft 10 in)
- Position: Striker

Team information
- Current team: Eléctrico
- Number: 11

Senior career*
Years	Team	Apps	(Gls)
2009–2010	Nalubaale		
2010–2013	Proline		
2011–2012	→ Saint George (loan)		
2013	SCVU		
2013–2014	Águias do Moradal	29	(16)
2014–2015	Beira-Mar	28	(5)
2015–2016	Limianos	29	(9)
2016–2017	Anadia	31	(8)
2017	Sanjoanense	7	(2)
2017–	Eléctrico	6	(1)

International career
- Uganda U20
2010–2013	Uganda	7	(1)
- * Club domestic league appearances and goals as of 1 February 2018

Patrick Lechi Edema (born 27 August 1992) is a Ugandan professional footballer who plays for Eléctrico.

== Club career ==
He made his professional debut in the Segunda Liga for Beira-Mar on 31 August 2014 in a game against Sporting B.

== International career ==
He represented the Uganda U20s at the 2010 CECAFA U-20 Championship.
