= 2026–27 Kariobangi Sharks FC season =

Kenyan football club season

Kariobangi Sharks
2026-27 NSL season
- Owner: Nick Mwendwa
- Chairman: Robert Maoga
- Head coach: William Muluya
- Stadium: Kasarani Annex

The 2026-27 season marked the return of Kariobangi Sharks to Kenya's second tier league, the Kenyan National Super League, after ten straight seasons in the Kenyan Premier League following relegation after a promotion/relegation playoff played in October 2026.

Sharks endured a tough camapaign in the 2025-26 Kenyan Premier League season, ending up in 16th spot in what was their worst positional finish since qualifying and featuring in the Kenya's top flight from the 2017 season. 38 points earned from eight wins, 14 draws and 12 loses destined Sharks to relegation/promotion playoff berth with the third best team in the second tier league, Mombasa United FC.

The playoff was shrouded in controversy and legal proceedings following the Football Kenya Federation applicaion of different rules governing the leagues for the season contrary to what had been applicable in the last ten seasons.The Federatrion declared the bpttom three sides relegated, Sharks included, as opposed to presenting them for a playoff leading to court cases.

The playoff eventually took off after both Mombasa United and Sharks agreed to it, despite the existence of court cases, following a meeting brokered by FKF. Mombasa United won the first leg played at Mbaraki Sports ground in Mombasa on 4 Oct 2026, 2-1, and in the return leg played at Ulinzi Complex on 6 October 2026, Sharks came from a goal down to lead 2-1 at half time to tie the game at 3-3 on aggregate. However, the game never ended though after fan trouble caused abaondonment of the game in the 62nd minute. The Football Kenya Federation Leagues and Competitions Department ruled that Sharks allegedly caused the abondment of the game and handed them a 'forefeiture' meaning they lost the game with a 2-0 score, hence a relgation on the basis of a 4-1 loss to Mombasa United.

Away from the relegation controversy, Sharks announced the transfer of some key players; skipper Kevinluke Otiala and goalkeeper Stepstenios Wekesa to AFC Leopards, and the 2024-25 season top scorer Ally Salum to Tanzania's Kagera Sugar. The team replaced those departing with the arrival of two forwards David Polepole and Douglas Omanga from Tusker FC and Fidel Otieno from Mathare United, amongst other players.

== Technical Bench ==
| Position | Staff |
|---|---|
| Head coach | (Kenya) William Muluya |
| Assistant head coach | (Kenya) Ezekiel Seda |
| Team Manager | (Kenya) Mathew Sam |
| Goalkeeper Trainer | (Kenya) James Ombeng |
| Head of Medical/Physio | (Kenya) John Kemboi |
| Strength & Conditioning Coach | (Kenya) Whyvonne Isuza |
| Kit Manager | (Kenya) Paul Otieno |

=== Managerial changes ===
| Outgoing Goalkeeper coach | Manner of departure | Incoming Goalkeeper coach | Date of appointment | ref |
|---|---|---|---|---|
| (Kenya) Sammy Okinda | Joined different team | (Kenya) James Ombeng | 18 September 2026 | |

== Transfers ==
The summer transfer window for the 2026-27 season was between 21 July - 21 September 2026.

=== In ===
| Date | Pos. | Player | From | Ref. |
|---|---|---|---|---|
| 2 Aug 2026 | AM | (Kenya) David Polepole | (Kenya) Tusker FC | |
| 31 Jul 2026 | FW | (Kenya) Douglas Omanga | (Kenya) Tusker FC | |
| 4 Aug 2026 | RB | (Kenya) Fidel Otieno | (Kenya) Mathare United | |
| 14 Aug 2026 | FW | (Kenya) Austine Tandasi | (Kenya) Ranje FC | |

=== Out ===
| Date | Pos. | Player | To | Ref. |
|---|---|---|---|---|
| 13 Jul 2026 | AM | (Kenya) Humphrey Aroko | (Sweden) FC Rosengård 1917 | |
| 13 Jul 2026 | MF | (Kenya) Wayne Dalvin | Free agent | |
| 30 Jul 2026 | CB | (Kenya) Kevinluke Otiala | (Kenya) AFC Leopards | |
| 30 Jul 2026 | GK | (Kenya) Sepstenios Wekesa | (Kenya) AFC Leopards | |
| 2 Aug 2026 | ST | (Tanzania) Ally Salum | (Tanzania) Kagera Sugar | |

== Competitions ==
=== Relegation/Promotion playoff ===
Win Draw Loss Fixtures

| 4 Oct 2026 First Leg | Mombasa United | 2-1 | Kariobangi Sharks | Mombasa |
| 15:00 UTC+3 | Toeri 67' (pen.); Waziri 75' | | Dalvine 82' | Stadium: Mbaraki Grounds; Referee: Brook Philips |

| 8 Mar 2026 Second Leg | Kariobangi Sharks | 0-2 (Awd.) | Mombasa United | Nairobi |
| 15:00 UTC+3 | Aroko 51', 66', 90', 90+1' | Report | | Stadium: Ulinzi Complex; Referee: John Sulwe |

== Matches ==
Sharks will start life in the second tier with a home game against Fortune FC at the Mpesa Foundation, Thika, on Monday 27 October 2026. It will be their first game in the NSL since their promotion win over Nzoia Sugar in Sudi, Bungoma, on 3 December 2016.

| 25 October 2026 1 | Kariobangi Sharks | v | Fortune F.C. | Thika |
| 15:00 UTC+3 | | Report | | Stadium: Mpesa Foundation |

| 31 October 2026 2 | Kariobangi Sharks | v | Gucha Stars | Nairobi |
| 15:00 UTC+3 | | | | Stadium: Kasarani Annex |

| 3 November 2026 3 | Kibera Black Stars | v | Kariobangi Sharks | Nairobi |
| 15:00 UTC+3 | | | | Stadium: Ligi Ndogo |

| 8 November 2026 4 | Kariobangi Sharks | v | BB FC | Nairobi |
| 15:00 UTC+3 | | | | Stadium: Dandora Stadium |

| 14 November 2026 5 | Kabati Youth FC | v | Kariobangi Sharks | Muranga |
| 15:00 UTC+3 | | | | Stadium: Sportpesa Arena, Muranga |
