= ELF Cup =

Football tournament

- Official Logo

Tournament details
- Host country: North Cyprus
- Dates: 19–25 November
- Teams: 8
- Venue: 1 (in 1 host city)

Final positions
- Champions: Northern Cyprus (1st title)
- Runners-up: Crimean Tatars
- Third place: Kyrgyzstan
- Fourth place: Zanzibar

Tournament statistics
- Matches played: 16
- Goals scored: 62 (3.88 per match)
- Top scorer(s): (Northern Cyprus) Ertaç Taşkıran (6 goals)

The ELF Cup (Equality, Liberty, Fraternity) was an international football tournament organised by the Cyprus Turkish Football Federation (KTFF), a member of the NF-Board. It was played only once, in 2006. Among the participants were NF-Board teams and FIFA member teams from the Asian Football Confederation.

== ELF Cup 2006 ==
The 2006 ELF Cup took place in the North Cyprus between November 19 and 25. Initially announced for non-FIFA teams only, the 2006 tournament also found places for three teams from the Asian Football Confederation - Tajikistan, Kyrgyzstan and Afghanistan. However, under pressure from FIFA, Afghanistan withdrew from the tournament.

=== Controversy ===
Initially, it was announced that the North Cyprus were to hold the inaugural VIVA World Cup tournament, organised by the NF-Board as a bi-annual competition for the best non-FIFA nations. However, a dispute between the NF-Board and a new regime at the KTFF led to the tournament being taken away and granted to Occitania. The NF-Board claimed that the new government of the North Cyprus insisted on restricting which nations could and could not take part. The KTFF, however, claimed that the NF-Board made unreasonable financial demands.

In response, the KTFF announced that the ELF Cup would be held at the same time as the VIVA World Cup, and have promised to pay travelling expenses to the participants, which has attracted some NF-Board members. The KTFF hope that the tournament will bring North Cyprus further into the international arena.

=== Competitors ===
- Crimean Tatars – representing the Crimean Tatars.
- Găgăuzia – Gagauzia, an autonomous region of Moldova.
- Greenland – an autonomous region of Denmark, and nominally under the control of the Danish Football Association and is a NF-Board member.
- Kyrgyzstan – a member of the AFC and FIFA, represented here by their futsal team.
- Tajikistan – a member of the AFC and FIFA, represented here by their futsal team.
- Tibet – an autonomous region of China, in exile and is a NF-Board member.
- Northern Cyprus – the hosts, an internationally unrecognised state and is a NF-Board member.
- Zanzibar – autonomous region of Tanzania, but with membership of the CAF and of the NF-Board, represented here by their under-20 national team.

=== Results ===
The eight participants were drawn into two groups of four, with the top two from each group progressing to the knockout stage.

==== Group A ====
Team	Pld	W	D	L	GF	GA	GD	Pts
Kyrgyzstan	3	2	0	1	7	2	+5	6
Zanzibar	3	1	2	0	3	2	+1	5
Greenland	3	1	1	1	3	2	+1	4
Găgăuzia	3	0	1	2	2	9	–7	1

November 19, 2006
12:00 EET

Găgăuzia	0–2	Greenland
		Sandgreen 33'; Kreutzmann 68' (pen.)

20 Temmuz Stadium, Kyrenia
Referee: Fahim Dayı (TRNC)

November 19, 2006
14:00 EET

Kyrgyzstan	0–1	Zanzibar
		Suleiman 9'

20 Temmuz Stadium, Kyrenia
Referee: Aziz Dayı (TRNC)

November 20, 2006
12:00 EET

Găgăuzia	1–6	Kyrgyzstan
Marcov 31'		Mamatov 14', 37'; Kadyrov 19'; Sundeev 65', 90'; Ryskulov 75'

Mağusa Dr. Fazıl Küçük Stadium, Gazimağusa
Referee: Mehmet Sezener (TRNC)

November 20, 2006
14:00 EET

Greenland	1–1	Zanzibar
Kreutzmann 78'		Omar 62'

Mağusa Dr. Fazıl Küçük Stadium, Gazimağusa
Referee: Serdar Bilginer (TRNC)

November 21, 2006
12:00 EET

Greenland	0–1	Kyrgyzstan
		Kondratkov 24'

20 Temmuz Stadium, Kyrenia
Referee: Cevdet Mertkaya (TRNC)

November 21, 2006
14:00 EET

Găgăuzia	1–1	Zanzibar
Ceavdari 79'		Muhammed 76'

20 Temmuz Stadium, Kyrenia
Referee: Alkın Gedikoğlu (TRNC)

==== Group B ====
Team	Pld	W	D	L	GF	GA	GD	Pts
Northern Cyprus	3	3	0	0	20	1	+19	9
Crimean Tatars	3	2	0	1	3	6	–3	6
Tajikistan	3	1	0	2	5	7	–2	3
Tibet	3	0	0	3	0	14	–14	0

November 19, 2006
12:00 EET

Tibet	0–3	Tajikistan
		Aknazarov 59', 67'; Faizullaev 65'

Zafer Stadium, Güzelyurt
Referee: Abdullah Özsusuzlu (TRNC)

November 19, 2006
18:30 EET

Crimean Tatars	0–5	Northern Cyprus
		Çakır 16'; Taşkıran 45'; Ablitarov 65' (o.g.); Uçaner 78'; Keleşzade 87'

Atatürk Stadium, Lefkoşa
Referee: Mehmet Malek (TRNC)

November 20, 2006
12:00 EET

Tibet	0–1	Crimean Tatars
		Ablâmetov 41' (pen.)

Zafer Stadium, Güzelyurt
Referee: Ulus Sediral (TRNC)

November 20, 2006
14:00 EET

Northern Cyprus	5–1	Tajikistan
Kolcu 34', 54'; Uçaner 65', 90+1'; Ulusoy 71'		Aknazarov 12'

Zafer Stadium, Güzelyurt
Referee: Serkan Şimşek (TRNC)

November 21, 2006
12:00 EET

Tajikistan	1–2	Crimean Tatars
Almukhamedov 45'		Ametov 36'; Hayredinov 87'

Mağusa Dr. Fazıl Küçük Stadium, Gazimağusa
Referee: Mehmet Evlat (TRNC)

November 21, 2006
14:00 EET

Northern Cyprus	10–0	Tibet
Çakır 13', 30', 37'; Çukurovalı 14', 24', 43'; Selden 17', 29'; Arıkbuka 54'; Kansu 77'

Mağusa Dr. Fazıl Küçük Stadium, Gazimağusa
Referee: Ramadan Göktan (TRNC)

==== Semi-finals ====
November 23, 2006
15:00 EET

Kyrgyzstan	2–3 (a.e.t.)	Crimean Tatars
Sundeev 90+2'; Mustafayev 102'		Emiratlı 18'; Ablâmetov 94' (pen.); Akimov 97'

Atatürk Stadium, Lefkoşa
Referee: Mehmet Özbilgehan (TRNC)

November 23, 2006
17:00 EET

Northern Cyprus	5–0	Zanzibar
Taşkıran 24', 34', 47', 83'; Ulusoy 59'

Atatürk Stadium, Lefkoşa
Referee: Savaş Tilki (TRNC)

==== 3rd Place Playoff ====
November 25, 2006
14:30 EET

Kyrgyzstan	2–2	Zanzibar
Mamatov 55'; Riskulov 65'		Muhammed 28', 47'
Penalties
	7–6

Atatürk Stadium, Lefkoşa

==== Final ====
November 25, 2006
16:30 EET

Northern Cyprus	3–1	Crimean Tatars
Çakır 1'; Sapsızoğlu 46'; Taşkıran 55'		Akimov 90+3'

Atatürk Stadium, Lefkoşa

2006 ELF Cup Winners
Northern Cyprus
First Title

=== Golden Team ===
Goalkeepers	Defenders	Midfielders	Forwards
(Northern Cyprus) Hasan Piro	(Greenland) Teller Mortensen (Tajikistan) Eller Aknazarov (Northern Cyprus) Hüseyin Amcaoğlu (Northern Cyprus) Serhan Önet	(Kyrgyzstan) Ulan Riskulov (Northern Cyprus) Hamis Çakır (Northern Cyprus) Derviş Kolcu (Zanzibar) Sale Juma	(Northern Cyprus) Ertaç Taşkıran (Zanzibar) Muhammed Seyf Muhammed

== Scorers ==
6 goals

- (Northern Cyprus) Ertaç Taşkıran

5 goals

- (Northern Cyprus) Hamis Çakır

4 goals

- (Kyrgyzstan) Ulan Riskulov

3 goals

- (Kyrgyzstan) Jenish Mamatov
- (Tajikistan) Daler Aknazarov
- (Northern Cyprus) Kemal Uçaner
- (Northern Cyprus) Ediz Çukurovalı
- (Zanzibar) Muhammed Seif Muhammed

2 goals

- (Greenland) Kresten Kreutzmann
- (Gagauzia) Piotr Marcov
- (Crimean Tatars) Marlen Akimov
- (Kyrgyzstan) Mihail Sundeev
- (Northern Cyprus) Derviş Kolcu
- (Northern Cyprus) Sabri Selden
- (Northern Cyprus) Coşkun Ulusoy

1 goal

- (Crimean Tatars) Irfan Ametov
- (Crimean Tatars) Ablâmetov Arsen
- (Crimean Tatars) Ebubekirov Fevziy
- (Crimean Tatars) Halil Hayredinov
- (Crimean Tatars) Emiratlı Ruslan
- (Gagauzia) Denis Ceavdari
- (Greenland) Lars Sandgreen
- (Kyrgyzstan) Mustafayev Arsen
- (Kyrgyzstan) Dilshat Kadyrov
- (Kyrgyzstan) Vadim Kondratkov
- (Kyrgyzstan) Sundeev Mihail
- (Tajikistan) Sergey Almukhamedov
- (Tajikistan) Firdavs Faizullaev
- (Northern Cyprus) Atkun Arıkbuka
- (Northern Cyprus) Yasin Kansu
- (Northern Cyprus) Ekrem Keleşzade
- (Northern Cyprus) Hasan Sapsızoğlu
- (Zanzibar) Rajab Rashid Omar
- (Zanzibar) Suleiman Kassim Suleiman

Own goals

- (Crimean Tatars) Rizvan Ablitarov (playing against TRNC)

== Match Ball ==
All the matches were played with Adidas Teamgeist balls.

== See also ==
- Non-FIFA football
- VIVA World Cup
- FIFI Wild Cup
- CONIFA
- Foreign relations of Northern Cyprus
