= CECAFA U-20 Championship =

Central and East African tournament for the U-20 Africa Cup of Nations

- Organiser(s): CECAFA
- Founded: 1971; 55 years ago
- Region: East Africa
- Teams: 7 to 11 teams
- Current champions: Sudan (1st title)
- Most championships: Uganda (5 titles)
- 2026 CECAFA U-20 Championship

The CECAFA U-20 Championship is a football (soccer) tournament in Africa. It is organised by the Council of East and Central Africa Football Associations (CECAFA), and includes national under 20 teams from Central and East Africa.

== Past winners ==
Year	Winners	Finalists	Hosts
1971; Details	Tanzania	Unknown	Unknown
1973; Details	Uganda	Kenya	Kenya
1975; Details	Kenya	Tanzania	Uganda
1981; Details	Somalia	Uganda	Somalia
1995; Details	Ethiopia	Tanzania	Kenya
1996; Details	Ethiopia	Uganda	Ethiopia
1999; Details	Kenya	Uganda	Kenya
2003; Details	Zanzibar	Uganda	Zanzibar
2005; Details	Ethiopia	Burundi	Zanzibar
2006; Details	Uganda	Burundi	Tanzania
2010; Details	Uganda	Eritrea	Eritrea
2019; Details	Tanzania	Kenya	Uganda
2020; Details	Uganda	Tanzania	Tanzania
2022; Details	Uganda	South Sudan	Sudan
2024; Details	Tanzania	Kenya	Tanzania
2026; Details	Sudan	Tanzania	Tanzania
