= Manzur Okwaro =

Kenyan footballer

Manzur Suleiman Okwaro is a Kenyan footballer who plays as left back for French side Stade De Reims, the Kenya U20 team, and the senior Kenya team.

Manzur featured of Kenya U20 at the 2025 U-20 Africa Cup of Nations in May 2025, and stepped out to feature for Kenya at the 2024 African Nations Championship held in Nairobi in August 2025.
