= Irfan Ametov =

Ukrainian footballer

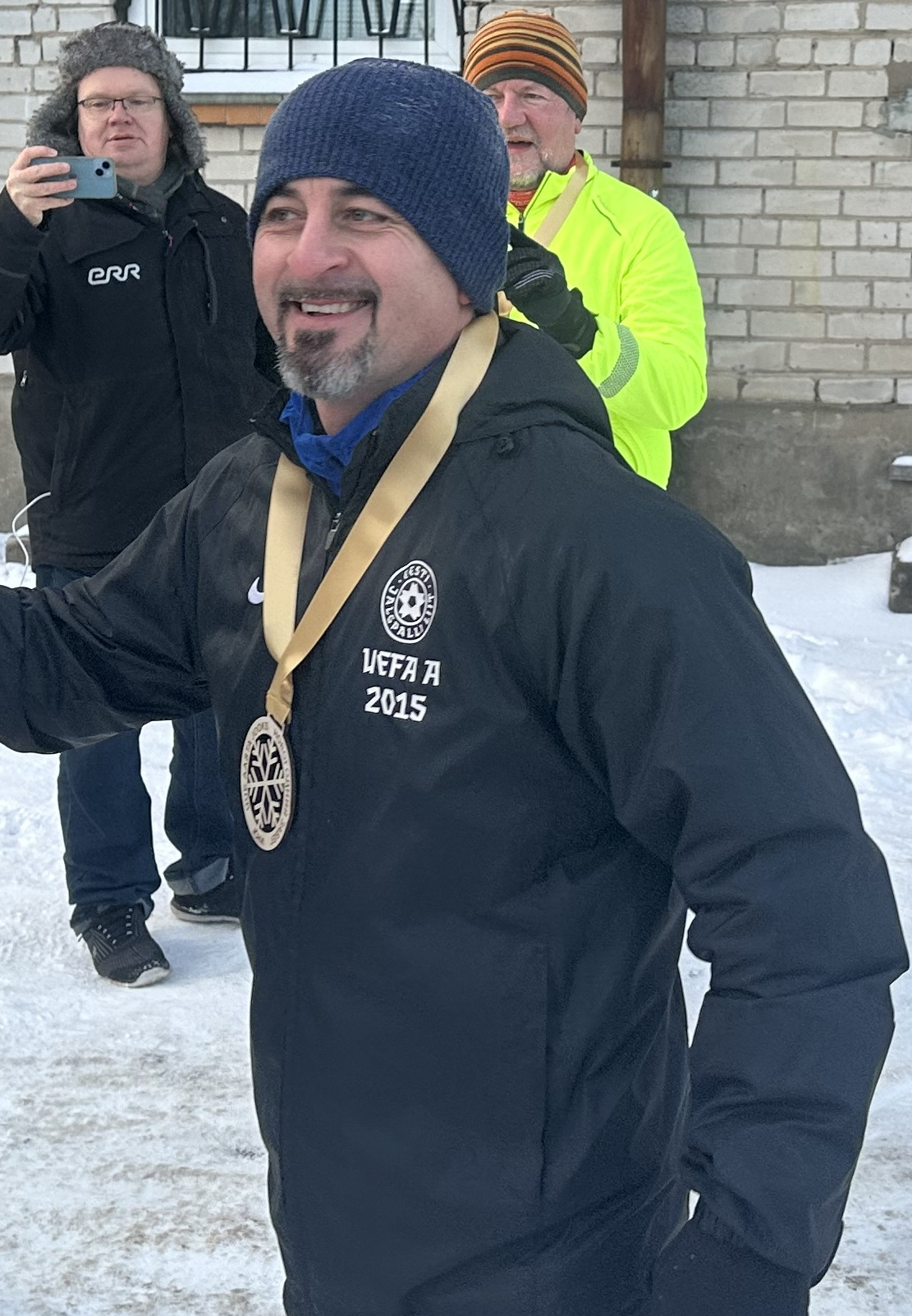

Personal information
- Full name: Irfan Ibraimovich Ametov
- Date of birth: 3 February 1980 (age 46)
- Place of birth: Shamaldy-Say, Osh Oblast, Kirghiz SSR, Soviet Union
- Height: 1.73 m (5 ft 8 in)
- Positions: Midfielder; striker

Senior career*
Years	Team	Apps	(Gls)
1999–2000	Mozdok	20	(1)
2001–2002	Tavriya		
2001	→ Ihroservice (loan)	16	(1)
2002	→ Polissya (loan)	12	(0)
2004	Kohtla-Järve FC Lootus	20	(6)
2005–2006	Narva Trans	44	(7)
2005–2006	→ Narva Trans-2 (loan)	23	(25)
2008–2012	Sillamäe	43	(15)
2011–2012	→ Sillamäe-2 (loan)	47	(30)
2013–2015	Irbis	40	(10)

International career
- Crimean Tatars

Managerial career
- 2017–2018: Sillamäe
- * Club domestic league appearances and goals

Irfan Ibraimovich Ametov (Crimean Tatar: Irfan Ibraim oğlu Ametov; born 3 February 1980) is a Ukrainian football manager and former footballer who last managed Sillamäe.

== Club football career ==
Before the 2004 season, Ametov signed for Estonian side Kohtla-Järve FC Lootus, where he was regarded as an important played for the club and scored on his debut. After that, she signed for Estonian side Sillamäe, where he was regarded as one of the clubs's most important players and helped them achieve second place during the 2009 season.

== International football career ==
Ametov played for the Crimean Tatars national football team at the 2006 ELF Cup.

== Futsal career ==
Ametov played futsal for Estonian side Anji Tallinn, where he played in the UEFA Futsal Cup.

== Style of play ==
Ametov can operate as a midfielder or striker and mainly operated as a central midfielder behind the striker.

== Managerial career ==
By 2014, Ametov was in the process of transitioning from a professional footballer to a manager. He later became a youth manager and managed hundreds of youth players. In 2017, he was appointed manager of Estonian side Sillamäe. The same year, he was banned for one game due to entering the referee's dressing room. In 2019, he was banned from football for four years due to fielding a suspended player and attempting to influence officials.

== Personal life ==
Ametov has had a Crimean-born wife and his children were born in Estonia.
