= South Sudan national under-20 football team =

National under-20 association football team representing South Sudan

South Sudan U-20
- Nickname: Bright Stars
- Association: South Sudan Football Association
- Confederation: CAF (Africa)
- Sub-confederation: CECAFA (East & Central Africa)
- Head coach: (South Sudan) Charles John Gwit Uok
- Captain: Agumemboki Felix
- Home stadium: Malakal Stadium
- FIFA code: SSD
First colours	Second colours

First international
- South Sudan 1–5 Uganda (Kampala, Uganda; 31 May 2018)

Biggest win
- South Sudan 4–0 Burundi (Arusha, Tanzania; 27 November 2020)

Biggest defeat
- South Sudan 1–5 Uganda (Kampala, Uganda; 31 May 2018)

FIFA U-20 World Cup
- Appearances: 0

Africa U-20 Cup of Nations
- Appearances: 1 (first in 2023)
- Best result: Quarter-finals (2023)

CECAFA U-20 Championship
- Appearances: 3 (first in 2019)
- Best result: Runners-up, (2022)
Medal record
CECAFA U-20 Championship
Silver medal – second place	2022 Sudan

The South Sudan national under-20 football team represents South Sudan under-20 level in the international football and is controlled by the South Sudan Football Association, the governing body for football in South Sudan.

== Team image ==
=== Nicknames ===
The South Sudan national under-20 football team has been known or nicknamed as Bright Stars

=== Home stadium ===
The team play its home matches on the Malakal Stadium and others stadiums.

== Current squad ==
The following squad was announced for recently finished 2022 CECAFA U-20 Championship

As of 22 December 2022

No.	Pos.	Player	Date of birth (age)	Caps	Goals	Club
1	GK	Godwill Yogusuk	22 June 2004	5	0	(South Sudan Football Association)
2	DF	Bul James	7 January 2004	4	0	(South Sudan Football Association)
3	DF	Agot Garang	5 May 2005	1	0	(South Sudan Football Association)
4	DF	Hamiza William	30 January 2004	0	0	(South Sudan Football Association)
5	DF	Emmanuel Sebit	9 September 2005	5	0	(South Sudan Football Association)
6	DF	Tuyian Chuol	20 November 2005	5	0	(South Sudan Football Association)
7	DF	Daniel Bichiok	22 February 2005	5	0	(South Sudan Football Association)
8	FW	Agumemboki Felix (Captain)	24 March 2004	0	0	(South Sudan Football Association)
9	MF	Korom Chagai	28 April 2003	0	0	(South Sudan Football Association)
10	MF	Kennedy Juma	13 December 2005	5	3	(South Sudan Football Association)
11	MF	Thomas Munguci	8 January 2004	2	0	(South Sudan Football Association)
12	MF	Thomas Munguci	22 December 2004	1	0	(South Sudan Football Association)
13	MF	Jacob Addis	4 July 2005	2	0	(South Sudan Football Association)
14	MF	Baankhi Talafun	9 August 2005	2	0	(South Sudan Football Association)
15	MF	Ochaya Okot	23 September 2005	5	0	(South Sudan Football Association)
16	MF	Kenyi Shadrack	8 October 2005	2	0	(South Sudan Football Association)
17	GK	Dario Kongyang	29 February 2005	8	0	(South Sudan Football Association)
18	FW	Silver Mador	5 January 2006	3	0	(South Sudan Football Association)
19	FW	Aluk Lual	22 may 2004	4	2	(South Sudan Football Association)
20	FW	Luk Gatreak	4 July 2005	4	2	(South Sudan Football Association)
21	FW	Peter Santos	23 February 2004	2	1	(South Sudan Football Association)
22	FW	Tito Lukciir	26 January 2004	2	1	(South Sudan Football Association)
23	FW	Riek De’Thol Diu	20 September 2003	1	1	(South Sudan Football Association)

== Fixtures and results ==
Legend

Win Draw Loss Fixture

== Competition records ==
=== FIFA U-20 World Cup record ===
FIFA U-20 World Cup
Year	Round	Position	Pld	W	D	L	GF	GA
(Tunisia) 1977	Part of Sudan							
(Japan) 1979	Part of Sudan							
(Australia) 1981	Part of Sudan							
(Mexico) 1983	Part of Sudan							
(Soviet Union) 1985	Part of Sudan							
(Chile) 1987	Part of Sudan							
(Saudi Arabia) 1989	Part of Sudan							
(Portugal) 1991	Part of Sudan							
(Australia) 1993	Part of Sudan							
(Qatar) 1995	Part of Sudan							
(Malaysia) 1997	Part of Sudan							
(Nigeria) 1999	Part of Sudan							
(Argentina) 2001	Part of Sudan							
(United Arab Emirates) 2003	Part of Sudan							
(Netherlands) 2005	Part of Sudan							
(Canada) 2007	Part of Sudan							
(Egypt) 2009	Part of Sudan							
(Colombia) 2011	Part of Sudan							
(Turkey) 2013	Did not enter							
(New Zealand) 2015	Withdrew before qualification							
(South Korea) 2017	Did not enter							
(Poland) 2019	Did not qualify							
(Argentina) 2023	Did not qualify							
(Chile) 2025	Did not qualify							
(Azerbaijan) (Uzbekistan) 2027	To be determined							
Total	–	0/25	0	0	0	0	0	0

=== Africa U-20 Cup of Nations ===
Africa U-20 Cup of Nations Record
Hosts / Year	Result	Position	GP	W	D*	L	GS	GA
(Egypt) 1991 to (South Africa) 2011	Part of Sudan							
(Algeria) 2013	Did not enter							
(Senegal) 2015	Withdrew before qualification							
(Zambia) 2017	Did not enter							
(Niger) 2019	Did not qualify							
(Mauritania) 2021	Did not qualify							
(Egypt) 2023	Quarter-finals	7th	4	1	1	2	2	7
Total	–	1/17	4	1	1	2	2	7

=== CECAFA U-20 Championship ===
CECAFA U-20 Championship Record
Hosts / Year	Result	Position	GP	W	D*	L	GS	GA
(Tanzania) 1971 to (Uganda) 2010	Part of Sudan							
(Uganda) 2019	Quarter-finals	–	3	1	1	1	6	4
(Tanzania) 2020	Third-place	–	4	2	1	1	6	2
(Sudan) 2022	Runners-up	–	5	2	2	1	4	2
Total	3/14	–	12	5	4	3	16	10
