= Amjad Ismail =

Sudanese footballer

Personal information
- Full name: Amjad Ismail Ahmed Ismail
- Date of birth: 1 January 1993 (age 33)
- Place of birth: Juba, Sudan
- Position: Centre-back

Team information
- Current team: Al-Ahly SC (Merowe)
- Number: 2

Senior career*
Years	Team	Apps	(Gls)
2012–2024	Al-Ahly Shendi		
2015-2016	Al-Nil SC (Shendi) (loan)		
2024	ALLBA SC (Jalu)		
2024-2025	Al-Andalus SC (Tobruk)		
2025-	Al-Ahly SC (Merowe)		

International career^{‡}
2016–	Sudan	4	(0)
- * Club domestic league appearances and goals as of 18:26, 6 November 2024 (UTC) ‡ National team caps and goals as of 6:00, 26 September 2022 (UTC)

Amjad Ismail Ahmed (Arabic: أمجد إسماعيل; born 1 January 1993) is a Sudanese professional footballer who plays as a centre-back for the Sudanese club Al-Ahly Shendi, and the Sudan national team.

== International career ==
Ismail made his international debut with the Sudan national team in a 2–1 friendly loss to Gabon on 2 September 2016. He was part of the Sudan squad that was called up for the 2021 Africa Cup of Nations.
