= Humphrey Aroko =

Kenyan footballer (born 2005)

Personal information
- Full name: Humphrey Aroko Omondi
- Date of birth: 16 December 2007 (age 18)
- Place of birth: Kenya
- Position: Midfielder

Team information
- Current team: FC Rosengård

Youth career
- 2018–2022: Kariobangi Sharks

Senior career*
Years	Team	Apps	(Gls)
2022–	Kariobangi Sharks		
2026–	→ FC Rosengård (loan)	6	(1)

International career^{‡}
2025	Kenya U20	2	(0)
- * Club domestic league appearances and goals as of 16 November 2026 ‡ National team caps and goals as of 10 October 2026

Humphrey Aroko Omondi (born 16 December 2007) is a Kenyan professional footballer who plays as a forward for Swedish side FC Rosengård and Kenya U20.

== Club career ==
Aroko was scouted by Kenyan Premier League club Kariobangi Sharks while pursuing his education at Highway Secondary School in Nairobi. He played a key role at the establishment helping the school claim the Kenya Schools gong in 2024. He joined the club's youth team in 2018 before being promoted to the senior team in 2022 from where he went on to establish himself featuring prominently in the 2024-25 Kenyan Premier League season. That season he made it to the Kenya U20 and represented the country at the 2025 U-20 Africa Cup of Nations held in Cairo, Egypt in May 2025.

He established himself during the 2025-26 Kenyan Premier League season and was named the best player in the month of February 2026.

At the end of the season he featured as one of the best scorers after netting 12 goals to emerge the third best scorer in the league, and ended up as the joint-top scorer in the Domestic Cup with six goals. Ultimately, during the end of season awards, Aroko was named as the New Player of the Year. After the season Aroko secured a move to Danish side FC Copenhagen who immediately loaned him to Rosengard in Sweden.
