= Malakal Stadium =

Building in South Sudan

Coordinates: 9°32′8″N 31°39′13″E

- Interactive map of Malakal Stadium
- Location: Malakal, South Sudan

Malakal Stadium is a multi-use stadium in Malakal, South Sudan. It was built with the help of UN Peacekeeping Forces (INDBATT).
