= Jonah Osabutey =

Ghanaian footballer

Personal information
- Date of birth: 8 October 1998 (age 28)
- Place of birth: Ghana
- Height: 1.81 m (5 ft 11 in)
- Position: Forward

Youth career
- 2015–2017: Tema Youth
- 2017: Werder Bremen

Senior career*
Years	Team	Apps	(Gls)
2017–2021	Werder Bremen II	31	(13)
2019–2020	→ Mouscron (loan)	22	(5)
2020–2021	→ OH Leuven (loan)	0	(0)
2021–2023	KV Kortrijk	0	(0)

International career
	Ghana U17	2	(0)
2015	Ghana U20	5	(0)
- * Club domestic league appearances and goals as of 8 June 2023

Jonah Osabutey (born 8 October 1998) is a Ghanaian professional footballer who plays as a forward.

== Career ==
In the 2018–19 season, Osabutey scored 12 goals and made 2 assists in 27 matches for the Werder Bremen reserves.

In June 2019, he extended his contract with Werder Bremen before joining Belgian First Division A side Royal Excel Mouscron on loan for the 2019–20 season. At Mouscron, Osabutey was voted "player of the season" ahead of teammates Deni Hočko and Jean Butez, having received over 50% of the votes. He had scored five goals and recorded four assists in the regular season. At the start of the 2020–21 season, Osabutey was loaned out again, but now to newly promoted Oud-Heverlee Leuven and with a buy clause.

Osabutey moved to Belgian First Division A club Kortrijk on 31 August 2021, the last day of the 2021 summer transfer window. He signed a one-year contract with the option of two further years. He never appeared for Kortrijk due to abdominal muscles injury and became a free agent in July 2023.
