= Zama Rambuwane =

Association football player

Personal information
- Full name: Zama Ashley Rambuwane
- Date of birth: 24 January 1997 (age 29)
- Place of birth: Alexandra, South Africa
- Position: Midfielder

Youth career
- –2014: SuperSport United

Senior career*
Years	Team	Apps	(Gls)
2014–2019	SuperSport United	6	(0)
2016–2017	→ Hapoel Ra'anana (loan)	7	(0)
2017	→ Ironi Nesher (loan)	9	(0)
2018	→ Platinum Stars (loan)	6	(1)
2018–2019	→ Cape Umoya United (loan)	10	(0)
- * Club domestic league appearances and goals

Zama Ashley Rambuwane (born 24 January 1997) is a South African soccer player who played as a midfielder.

== Club career ==
=== SuperSport United ===
In February 2014, Rambuwane was promoted to SuperSport United's senior team.

In June 2015, he trialled with Club Brugge. In August 2016, he trialled in Portugal and Israel.

==== Loan to Hapoel Ra'anana ====
On 25 August 2016, Rambuwane joined Hapoel Ra'anana on a one-year loan deal with a permanent transfer option at the end of the season.

==== Loan to Ironi Nesher ====
After featuring 7 times for Hapoel Ra'anana in Israel's top-flight, on 25 January 2017 Rambuwane joined Ironi Nesher from Israel's second division on a loan until the end of the season to get game time and become fully acclimatised to Israel.

==== Loan to Platinum Stars ====
In January 2018, Rambuwane joined Platinum Stars on a six-month loan until the end of the season. He scored against Ajax Cape Town in his debut match for the club.

==== Loan to Cape Umoya United ====
In July 2018, Rambuwane was loaned to Cape Umoya United.
