= Cyprus Turkish Football Association =

Association football governing body of Northern Cyprus

ConIFA
- Founded: 29 October 1955
- ConIFA affiliation: 2013
- President: Hasan Sertoğlu
- Website: Official site

The Cyprus Turkish Football Association (Turkish: Kıbrıs Türk Futbol Federasyonu, KTFF) is the governing body of football in the Turkish Republic of Northern Cyprus (TRNC). Established on 29 October 1955, during British colonial rule in Cyprus, it was affiliated with the N.F.-Board from 2003 until the board's dissolution in 2013. Since 2013, the KTFF has been affiliated with the Confederation of Independent Football Associations.

== League system ==
Süper Lig is the top division of the TRNC Football Federation.

The CTFA currently oversee the provision of 4 professional football leagues in the TRNC. The pyramid consists of the Süper Lig, 1. Lig, BTM 1. Lig and BTM 2. Lig (top division to lowest division).

== The leaders of the KTFF ==
List of presidents.

N°	Name	Period
1	Ahmet Sami Topcan	30 October 1955 – 7 December 1960
2	Necdet Ünel	7 December 1960 – 22 May 1963
3 (2)	Ahmet Sami Topcan	22 May 1963 – 6 June 1987
4	Özer Esenyel	6 June 1987 – 10 April 1990
5	Nevvar Nolan	10 April 1990 – 14 June 1992
6 (2)	Özer Esenyel	14 June 1992 – 18 June 1995
7	Ömer Adal	18 June 1995 – 26 June 2005
8	Niyazi Okutan	26 June 2005 – 21 June 2008
9 (2)	Ömer Adal	21 June 2008 – 10 November 2010
10	Hasan Sertoğlu	10 November 2010 – Incumbent

== See also ==
- Sport in Northern Cyprus
- Cyprus Football Association
