= Ethiopia national under-20 football team =

National under-20 association football team representing Ethiopia

Ethiopia U-20
- Nickname: ዋልያዎቹ (The Walia Ibex)
- Association: Ethiopian Football Federation (EFF)
- Confederation: CAF (Africa)
- Sub-confederation: CECAFA (East & Central Africa)
- Home stadium: Addis Ababa Stadium
First colours	Second colours

First international
- Ethiopia 0–2 Kenya (8 August 1978)

U-20 Africa Cup of Nations
- Appearances: 7 (first in 1979)
- Best result: Fourth place (1993, 2001)

FIFA U-20 World Cup
- Appearances: 1 (first in 2001)
- Best result: Group stage (2001)

The Ethiopian national under-20 football team, also known as Ethiopia Under-20 or Ethiopia U20 (Amharic:ከ 20 ዓመት በታች የወንዶች እግር ኳስ ብሔራዊ ቡድን), represents Ethiopia in association football at an under-20 age level and is controlled by Ethiopian Football Federation, the governing body for football in Ethiopia. The current coach is Atinafu Alemu

== Competitive record ==
=== FIFA U-20 World Cup record ===
FIFA U-20 World Cup record
Year	Round	GP	W	D^{1}	L	GS	GA
(Tunisia) 1977	Did not qualify						
(Japan) 1979	Did not qualify						
(Australia) 1981	Did not qualify						
(Mexico) 1983	Did not qualify						
(Soviet Union) 1985	Did not qualify						
(Chile) 1987	Did not qualify						
(Saudi Arabia) 1989	Did not qualify						
(Portugal) 1991	Did not qualify						
(Australia) 1993	Did not qualify						
(Qatar) 1995	Did not qualify						
(Malaysia) 1997	Did not qualify						
(Nigeria) 1999	Did not qualify						
(Argentina) 2001	Group stage	3	0	0	3	4	8
(United Arab Emirates) 2003	Did not qualify						
(Netherlands) 2005	Did not qualify						
(Canada) 2007	Did not qualify						
(Egypt) 2009	Did not qualify						
(Colombia) 2011	Did not qualify						
(Turkey) 2013	Did not qualify						
(New Zealand) 2015	Did not qualify						
(South Korea) 2017	Did not qualify						
(Poland) 2019	Did not qualify						
(Argentina) 2023	Did not qualify						
(Chile) 2025	Did not qualify						
(Azerbaijan) (Uzbekistan) 2027	To be determined						
(Armenia) (Georgia (country)) 2029	To be determined						
Total	1/26	3	0	0	3	4	8

^{1}Draws include knockout matches decided on penalty kicks.

== Current squad ==
- The following players were called up for the 2022 CECAFA U-20 Championship.
- Match dates: 28 October – 11 November 2022
- Caps and goals correct as of: 5 November 2022, after the match against Uganda

No.	Pos.	Player	Date of birth (age)	Caps	Goals	Club
1	GK	Daniel Yisseha	19	0	0	(Ethiopian Football Federation) Ethiopian Insurance
22	GK	Wubeshet Chilalo	19	2	0	(Ethiopian Football Federation) Defence Force
2	DF	Yisak Keno	20	2	0	Unknown
4	DF	Eyob Samuel	19	2	0	(Ethiopian Football Federation) Defence Force
5	DF	Butaka Shamena	19	2	0	(Ethiopian Football Federation) Arba Minch City
12	DF	Yodahe Dawit	19	2	0	(Ethiopian Football Federation) Defence Force
19	DF	Abdi Wabela	20	0	0	(Ethiopian Football Federation) Adama City
6	MF	Yerosen Samson	16	2	0	(Ethiopian Football Federation) Ethiopia Sport Academy
13	MF	Mustgb Bedru	20	0	0	Unknown
14	MF	Mukerem Reshid	19	0	0	(Ethiopian Football Federation) Ethio Electric
15	MF	Yared Bruk	18	1	0	Unknown
16	MF	Yitagesu Tariku	19	1	0	Unknown
8	MF	Fuad Abdella	20	2	0	(Ethiopian Football Federation) Saint George
18	MF	Abubeker Shamil	19	2	0	(Ethiopian Football Federation) Arba Minch City
21	MF	Wegene Gezahegn	19	2	0	(Ethiopian Football Federation) Ethiopian Insurance
7	FW	Yosef Tarekegn	19	1	1	(Ethiopian Football Federation) Adama City
9	FW	Tegenu Teshome	18	1	0	(Ethiopian Football Federation) Saint George
10	FW	Kedir Ali	18	2	2	(Ethiopian Football Federation) Ethiopian Coffee
11	FW	Amanuel Admasu	18	2	0	(Ethiopian Football Federation) Ethiopian Coffee
20	FW	Zelalem Abate	19	2	0	(Ethiopian Football Federation) Wolaitta Dicha

== Honours ==
- CECAFA U-20 Championship:
  - Winners (3): 1995, 1996, 2005
