= Isma Mugulusi =

Ugandan footballer (born 2003)

Personal information
- Full name: Isma Mugulusi
- Date of birth: 10 October 2003 (age 23)
- Place of birth: Jinja, Uganda
- Position: Midfielder

Team information
- Current team: URA

Senior career*
Years	Team	Apps	(Gls)
2019–2021	Busoga United	20	(4)
2021–2022	Villa	0	(0)
2022–2023	Makedonikos	15	(0)
2024	FK Riteriai	0	(0)
2024–	URA	0	(0)

International career^{‡}
2019	Uganda U17	3	(0)
2021–	Uganda U20	6	(0)
2021–	Uganda	6	(0)
- * Club domestic league appearances and goals ‡ National team caps and goals as of 16:08, 22 December 2022 (UTC)

Isma Mugulusi (born 10 October 2003) is a Ugandan professional footballer who plays as a midfielder for Uganda Premier League Club Uganda Revenue Authority SC and the Uganda national team.

== Personal life ==
Isma's older brother Ibrahim is also a footballer.

== Club career ==
Mugulusi returned to the Uganda Premier League in 2024 from Makedonikos in Greece and FK Riteriai in Lithuania. He has been playing in Europe since 2022.

== Honours ==
Uganda U20

- Africa U-20 Cup of Nations runner-up: 2021
