= Rwanda national under-20 football team =

National under-20 association football team representing Rwanda

Rwanda
- Nickname: Amavubi (The Wasps)
- Association: Rwandese Association Football Federation (FERWAFA)
- Confederation: CAF
- Sub-confederation: CECAFA
- Head coach: Gerard Buscher (interim)
- FIFA code: RWA
First colours	Second colours

African U-20 Championship
- Appearances: 2 (first in 2009)
- Best result: Group stage, 2009

The Rwanda national under-20 football team represents Rwanda in football at this age level and is controlled by the Rwandese Association Football Federation. The team competes for the African U-20 Championship, held every two years, and the FIFA U-20 World Cup.

== Current squad ==
The following players called up for the 2015 African U-20 Championship qualification matches against South Sudan.

Pos.	Player	Date of Birth (age)	Club
GK	Olivier Kwizera	30 July 1995 (age 30)	(Rwanda) A.P.R.
GK	Kassim Ndayisenga		(Rwanda) A.P.R.
GK	Omar Rwabugiri		(Rwanda) A.P.R.
DF	Fitina Ombolenga		(Rwanda) Kiyovu Sports
DF	Célestin Ndayishimiye	11 October 1995 (age 30)	(Rwanda) Kiyovu Sports
DF	Yves Rwigema		(Rwanda) Academie Futelite
DF	Pacifique Shema	20 March 1996 (age 29)	(France) US Orléans
DF	Eric Rutanga	7 November 1994 (age 31)	(Rwanda) A.P.R.
DF	Olivier Niyonzima		(Rwanda) Isonga
MF	Robert Ndatimana	26 June 1994 (age 31)	(Rwanda) Rayon Sports
MF	Djihad Bizimana		(Rwanda) Rayon Sports
MF	Yannick Mukunzi	2 October 1995 (age 30)	(Rwanda) A.P.R.
MF	Hussein Cyiza		(Rwanda) Mukura Victory
MF	Alfred Mugabo	9 October 1995 (age 30)	(England) Arsenal
MF	Anderson Neza	1 May 1996 (age 29)	(Rwanda) Academie Futelite
FW	Bayana Nova		(Rwanda) A.P.R.
FW	Maxime Sekamana	23 December 1995 (age 30)	(Rwanda) A.P.R.
FW	Patrick Sibomana	15 October 1995 (age 30)	(Rwanda) A.P.R.
FW	Bertrand Iradukunda		(Rwanda) Isonga
FW	Blaise Itangishaka		(Rwanda) Kiyovu Sports
FW	Fiston Nkinzingabo		(Rwanda) Academie Futelite
