= Zanzibar national under-20 football team =

Zanzibar Under 20
- Association: Zanzibar Football Association
- Confederation: CAF
- Head coach: ?
- Home stadium: Amaan Stadium
First colours	Second colours

First international
- Zanzibar 2–4 Zambia (Mombassa, Tanzania, unknown date 1995)

Biggest win
- Zanzibar 3–0 Ethiopia (Zanzibar City, Zanzibar, 21 September 2003)

Biggest defeat
- Northern Cyprus 5–0 Zanzibar (Nicosia, Northern Cyprus; 23 November 2006)

The Zanzibar national under-20 football team is an international association football team representing the island nation of Zanzibar at the under 20 level. In some competitions such as the ELF Cup, the team have represented the full Zanzibar national football team. The team achieved fourth place at the 2006 ELF Cup in Northern Cyprus.

== Honours ==
- CECAFA U-20 Championship:
  - Winners (1): 2003
