= Somalia national under-20 football team =

National under-20 association football team representing Somalia

Somalia U-20
- Nickname: The Ocean Stars
- Association: Somali Football Federation (Xiriirka Soomaaliyeed ee Kubbadda Cagta)
- Confederation: CAF (Africa)
- Sub-confederation: CECAFA (Central & East Africa)
- Home stadium: Mogadishu Stadium
First colours	Second colours

First international
- Uganda 1–2 Somalia (Kampala, Uganda; 14 June 1986)

Biggest defeat
- Somalia 1–8 Tanzania (Karatu, Tanzania; 26 November 2020)

U-20 Africa Cup of Nations
- Appearances: 1 (first in 1987)
- Best result: Semi-finals (1987)

FIFA U-20 World Cup
- Appearances: None

The Somalia national under-20 football team, nicknamed the Ocean Stars, represents Somalia in international youth football competitions. Its primary role is the development of players in preparation for the senior national team. The team competes in a variety of competitions, including the biennial FIFA U-20 World Cup and the U-20 Africa Cup of Nations, which is the top competitions for this age group.

== History ==
The Somalia national under-20 football team was first established to participate in the 1987 African Youth Championship. In their debut, they achieved a remarkable feat by defeating Uganda in the first round. Although they lost to Zimbabwe in the subsequent round, Zimbabwe was disqualified for fielding ineligible players, allowing Somalia to advance to the semifinals, where they faced Nigeria. However, after this, the team did not participate in any major tournaments until the 2001 African Youth Championship, where they were disqualified in the preliminary round against Uganda. In the 2003 edition, they suffered a significant 6–0 defeat against Nigeria, one of Africa’s football powerhouses.

In 2021, Somalia re-entered the international youth football scene, competing in the 2020 CECAFA U-20 Championship, which also served as a qualifier for the 2021 U-20 Africa Cup of Nations in Mauritania. Despite being placed in a challenging group with Tanzania and Djibouti, they narrowly lost 2–1 to Djibouti and recorded a heavy 8–1 defeat to Tanzania..In 2023 Somalia did not enter to the 2023 U-20 Africa Cup of Nations qualification nor the 2025 U-20 Africa Cup of Nations qualification in 2025.

== Competitive record ==
=== FIFA U-20 World Cup record ===
FIFA U-20 World Cup record
Year	Round	GP	W	D^{1}	L	GS	GA
(Tunisia) 1977	Did not qualify						
(Japan) 1979	Did not qualify						
(Australia) 1981	Did not qualify						
(Mexico) 1983	Did not qualify						
(Soviet Union) 1985	Did not qualify						
(Chile) 1987	Did not qualify						
(Saudi Arabia) 1989	Did not qualify						
(Portugal) 1991	Did not qualify						
(Australia) 1993	Did not qualify						
(Qatar) 1995	Did not qualify						
(Malaysia) 1997	Did not qualify						
(Nigeria) 1999	Did not qualify						
(Argentina) 2001	Did not qualify						
(United Arab Emirates) 2003	Did not qualify						
(Netherlands) 2005	Did not qualify						
(Canada) 2007	Did not qualify						
(Egypt) 2009	Did not qualify						
(Colombia) 2011	Did not qualify						
(Turkey) 2013	Did not qualify						
(New Zealand) 2015	Did not qualify						
(South Korea) 2017	Did not qualify						
(Poland) 2019	Did not qualify						
(Argentina) 2023	Did not qualify						
(Chile) 2025	Did not qualify						
(Azerbaijan) (Uzbekistan) 2027	to be determined						
Total	0/25	0	0	0	0	0	0

^{1}Draws include knockout matches decided on penalty kicks.

== See also ==
- Somalia national football team
- Somalia national under-17 football team
