= Tanzania national under-20 football team =

National under-20 association football team representing Tanzania

Tanzania U-20
- Nickname: Ngorongoro Boys
- Association: Tanzania Football Federation
- Confederation: CAF (Africa)
- Sub-confederation: CECAFA
- Home stadium: Benjamin Mkapa Stadium
First colours	Second colours	Third colours

First international
- South Africa 3–0 Tanzania (Pretoria, South Africa; 22 December 1996)

Biggest win
- Somalia 1–8 Tanzania (Karatu, Tanzania; 26 November 2020)

U-20 Africa Cup of Nations
- Appearances: 2 (first in 2021)
- Best result: Group stage (2021, 2025)

FIFA U-20 World Cup
- Appearances: None

The Tanzania national under-20 football team, nicknamed the Ngorongoro Boys, represents Tanzania in international youth football competitions. Its primary role is the development of players in preparation for the senior national team. The team competes in a variety of competitions, including the biennial FIFA U-20 World Cup and the U-20 Africa Cup of Nations, which is the top competitions for this age group.

They also participate in the CECAFA U-20 Championship which serves as a qualifier to the U-20 Africa Cup of Nations, winning it twice, in the 1971 and 2019 CECAFA U-20 Championships, and have been runners-up three times, in the 1975, 1995, and 2020 CECAFA U-20 Championships.

== Honours ==
- CECAFA U-20 Championship:
  - Winners (2): 1971, 2019
  - Runners-up (3): 1975, 1995, 2020

== Competitive record ==
=== FIFA U-20 World Cup record ===
FIFA U-20 World Cup record
Year	Round	GP	W	D^{1}	L	GS	GA
(Tunisia) 1977	Did not qualify						
(Japan) 1979	Did not qualify						
(Australia) 1981	Did not qualify						
(Mexico) 1983	Did not qualify						
(Soviet Union) 1985	Did not qualify						
(Chile) 1987	Did not qualify						
(Saudi Arabia) 1989	Did not qualify						
(Portugal) 1991	Did not qualify						
(Australia) 1993	Did not qualify						
(Qatar) 1995	Did not qualify						
(Malaysia) 1997	Did not qualify						
(Nigeria) 1999	Did not qualify						
(Argentina) 2001	Did not qualify						
(United Arab Emirates) 2003	Did not qualify						
(Netherlands) 2005	Did not qualify						
(Canada) 2007	Did not qualify						
(Egypt) 2009	Did not qualify						
(Colombia) 2011	Did not qualify						
(Turkey) 2013	Did not qualify						
(New Zealand) 2015	Did not qualify						
(South Korea) 2017	Did not qualify						
(Poland) 2019	Did not qualify						
(Argentina) 2023	Did not qualify						
(Chile) 2025	Did not qualify						
(Azerbaijan) (Uzbekistan) 2027	to be determined						
Total	0/25	0	0	0	0	0	0

^{1}Draws include knockout matches decided on penalty kicks.

=== U-20 Africa Cup of Nations record ===
U-20 Africa Cup of Nations
Appearances: 2
Year	Round	Position	GP	W	D	L	GS	GA
1979	did not enter							
1981	did not enter							
1983	did not enter							
1985	did not enter							
1987	did not enter							
1989	did not enter							
(Egypt) 1991	did not enter							
(Mauritius) 1993	did not enter							
(Nigeria) 1995	did not enter							
(Morocco) 1997	did not qualify							
(Ghana) 1999	did not qualify							
(Ethiopia) 2001	did not qualify							
(Burkina Faso) 2003	did not qualify							
(Benin) 2005	Withdrew before qualification							
(Republic of the Congo) 2007	did not enter							
(Democratic Republic of the Congo) 2009	Withdrew before qualification							
(South Africa) 2011	did not qualify							
(Algeria) 2013	did not qualify							
(Senegal) 2015	did not qualify							
(Zambia) 2017	did not enter							
(Niger) 2019	did not qualify							
(Mauritania) 2021	Group stage	12th	3	0	1	2	1	8
(Egypt) 2023	did not qualify							
(Egypt) 2025	Group stage	13th	4	0	0	4	0	4
Total	Group stage	2/24	7	0	1	6	1	12
