= Eritrea national under-20 football team =

National under-20 association football team representing Eritrea

Eritrea
- Association: Eritrean National Football Federation
- Confederation: CAF (Africa)
- Head coach: None
- Home stadium: Africa stadium
- FIFA code: ERI
| First colours | Second colours |

African Youth Championship
- Appearances: 0

The Eritrea national under-20 football team is the national under-20 football team of Eritrea.

== Honours ==
- CECAFA U-20 Championship:
  - Runners-up (1): 2010
