= Sudan national under-20 football team =

National under-20 association football team representing Sudan

Sudan Under-20
- Nickname: صقور الجديان (Falcons of Jediane)
- Association: Sudan Football Association (SFA)
- Confederation: CAF (Africa)
- Sub-confederation: CECAFA (East & Central Africa)
- Home stadium: Khartoum Stadium
- FIFA code: SUD
First colours	Second colours

U-20 Africa Cup of Nations
- Appearances: 4 (first in 1983)
- Best result: Group stage (1997, 2017)

FIFA U-20 World Cup
- Appearances: None

The Sudan national under-20 football team, nicknamed the Falcons of Jediane, represents Sudan in international youth football competitions. Its primary role is the development of players in preparation for the senior national team. The team competes in a variety of competitions, including the biennial FIFA U-20 World Cup and the U-20 Africa Cup of Nations, which is the top competitions for this age group.

== Competitive record ==
=== FIFA U-20 World Cup record ===
FIFA U-20 World Cup record
Year	Round	GP	W	D^{1}	L	GS	GA
(Tunisia) 1977	Did not qualify						
(Japan) 1979	Did not qualify						
(Australia) 1981	Did not qualify						
(Mexico) 1983	Did not qualify						
(Soviet Union) 1985	Did not qualify						
(Chile) 1987	Did not qualify						
(Saudi Arabia) 1989	Did not qualify						
(Portugal) 1991	Did not qualify						
(Australia) 1993	Did not qualify						
(Qatar) 1995	Did not qualify						
(Malaysia) 1997	Did not qualify						
(Nigeria) 1999	Did not qualify						
(Argentina) 2001	Did not qualify						
(United Arab Emirates) 2003	Did not qualify						
(Netherlands) 2005	Did not qualify						
(Canada) 2007	Did not qualify						
(Egypt) 2009	Did not qualify						
(Colombia) 2011	Did not qualify						
(Turkey) 2013	Did not qualify						
(New Zealand) 2015	Did not qualify						
(South Korea) 2017	Did not qualify						
(Poland) 2019	Did not qualify						
(Argentina) 2023	Did not qualify						
(Chile) 2025	Did not qualify						
(Azerbaijan) (Uzbekistan) 2027	To be determined						
Total	0/25	0	0	0	0	0	0

^{1}Draws include knockout matches decided on penalty kicks.

== Current squad ==
- The following players were called up for the 2024 CECAFA U-20 Championship.
- Match dates: 6 October – 15 October 2024
- Caps and goals correct as of: 15 October 2024, after the match against Kenya

No.	Pos.	Player	Date of birth (age)	Caps	Goals	Club
1	GK	Muhamed Abdallah Juru	4 August 2005 (age 20)	5	0	Al Ahli SC (Khartoum)
2	DF	Ebrahim Hashem	Unknown	2	0	Unknown
3	DF	Alburaei Jamal	18 January 2005 (age 20)	5	0	Hay Al-Wadi SC (Nyala)
4	DF	Marwan Taha	10 January 2006 (age 19)	2	0	Hay Al-Wadi SC (Nyala)
5	DF	Munzer Abdu	Unknown	2	2	Al-Merrikh SC
6	DF	Fakhreldin Suliman	Unknown	2	0	(Sudan Football Association) Al-Hilal SC
7	DF	Abdallah Osman	23 July 2006 (age 19)	5	0	Hay Al-Wadi SC (Nyala)
8	MF	Munzer Muhamed Badri	Unknown	4	0	Al-Merrikh SC
9	MF	Khaled Yahya	Unknown	1	0	Unknown
10	MF	Alothaimeen Shamseldin	Unknown	2	1	Al-Mourada SC
11	FW	Musa Husein	27 October 2006 (age 19)	8	4	Al-Merrikh SC
12	FW	Ahmed Esmat	17 March 2006 (age 19)	0	0	Al-Hilal SC
13	MF	Waheed Shendi	Unknown	5	0	Al-Merrikh SC
14	MF	Abuelgasem Ahmed	Unknown	1	1	Unknown
15	FW	Yaser Awad	15 March 2005 (age 20)	0	0	Al-Hilal SC
16	GK	Abdelbaset Awad	Unknown	0	0	Al-Merrikh SC
17	FW	Allam Muhamed	Unknown	2	0	Al Neel SC (Khartoum)
18	GK	Mustafa Muhamed Algadal	Unknown	0	0	Unknown
19	FW	Awab Anter	Unknown	0	0	Al-Merrikh SC
20	FW	Amar Almahi	Unknown	3	1	(Sudan Football Association) Al-Merrikh SC

== See also ==
- Sudan national football team
- Sudan national under-17 football team
