= Uganda national under-20 football team =

National under-20 association football team representing Uganda

Uganda U-20
- Nickname: The Hippos
- Association: Federation of Uganda Football Associations (FUFA)
- Confederation: CAF (Africa)
- Sub-confederation: CECAFA
- Head coach: Laryea Kingston
- Home stadium: Mandela National Stadium
- FIFA code: UGA
First colours	Second colours	Third colours

U-20 Africa Cup of Nations
- Appearances: 4 (first in 1985)
- Best result: Runners-up (2021)

FIFA U-20 World Cup
- Appearances: None

The Uganda national under-20 football team is the under-20 youth team for national football in Uganda. The team is controlled by the Federation of Uganda Football Associations.

The team is coached by a former Ghanaian International Laryea Kingston who is also the full time coach that is in charge of the youth national teams in Uganda.

== Honours ==
- CECAFA U-20 Championship:
  - Winners (4): 1973, 2006, 2010, 2020, 2022
  - Runners-up (4): 1981, 1996, 1999, 2003.
- [./Https://www.fufa.co.ug/total-afcon-u20-a-lot-achieved-by-the-hippos-despite-falling-to-ghana-in-the-final/ Total AFCON U20], Runners- Ups (1): 2021

== Competitive record ==
=== FIFA U-20 World Cup record ===
FIFA U-20 World Cup record
Year	Round	GP	W	D^{1}	L	GS	GA
(Tunisia) 1977	Did not qualify						
(Japan) 1979	Did not qualify						
(Australia) 1981	Did not qualify						
(Mexico) 1983	Did not qualify						
(Soviet Union) 1985	Did not qualify						
(Chile) 1987	Did not qualify						
(Saudi Arabia) 1989	Did not qualify						
(Portugal) 1991	Did not qualify						
(Australia) 1993	Did not qualify						
(Qatar) 1995	Did not qualify						
(Malaysia) 1997	Did not qualify						
(Nigeria) 1999	Did not qualify						
(Argentina) 2001	Did not qualify						
(United Arab Emirates) 2003	Did not qualify						
(Netherlands) 2005	Did not qualify						
(Canada) 2007	Did not qualify						
(Egypt) 2009	Did not qualify						
(Colombia) 2011	Did not qualify						
(Turkey) 2013	Did not qualify						
(New Zealand) 2015	Did not qualify						
(South Korea) 2017	Did not qualify						
(Poland) 2019	Did not qualify						
(Argentina) 2023	Did not qualify						
(Chile) 2025	Did not qualify						
(Azerbaijan) (Uzbekistan) 2027	To be determined						
Total	0/25	0	0	0	0	0	0

^{1}Draws include knockout matches decided on penalty kicks.

== 2023 squad ==
The following players were called up for the 2023 U-20 Africa Cup of Nations.

No.	Pos.	Player	Date of birth (age)	Club
1	GK	Shamulan Kamya	3 July 2004 (age 22)	(Federation of Uganda Football Associations) Bright Stars FC
2	DF	Justine Opiro	28 December 2003 (age 22)	(Federation of Uganda Football Associations) URA SC
3	FW	Alpha Ssali	29 December 2003 (age 22)	(Federation of Uganda Football Associations) Proline FC
4	DF	Samson Kasozi	10 October 2003 (age 23)	(Federation of Uganda Football Associations) Simba FC
5	DF	Rogers Torach	23 June 2003 (age 23)	(Federation of Uganda Football Associations) Vipers SC
6	DF	Ronald Madoi	4 April 2004 (age 22)	(Federation of Uganda Football Associations) Wakiso Giants FC
7	MF	Isma Mugulusi (captain)	10 October 2003 (age 23)	(Hellenic Football Federation) Makedonikos
8	MF	Titus Ssematimba	15 August 2003 (age 23)	(Federation of Uganda Football Associations) Wakiso Giants FC
9	FW	Emmanuel Mukisa	24 December 2003 (age 22)	(Federation of Uganda Football Associations) Kataka FC
10	MF	Travis Mutyaba	7 August 2005 (age 21)	(Federation of Uganda Football Associations) SC Villa
11	FW	Issa Bugembe	10 August 2004 (age 22)	(Federation of Uganda Football Associations) Bright Stars FC
12	DF	Ibrahim Juma	6 May 2004 (age 22)	(Royal Spanish Football Federation) Leganés
13	MF	Frank Katongole	8 December 2005 (age 20)	(Federation of Uganda Football Associations) St Mary's SS
14	FW	John Paul Dembe	3 July 2005 (age 21)	(Federation of Uganda Football Associations) KCCA
15	MF	Saidi Mayanja	12 August 2003 (age 23)	(Federation of Uganda Football Associations) KCCA
16	DF	Umar Lutalo	15 December 2003 (age 22)	(Federation of Uganda Football Associations) SC Villa
17	DF	Haruna Lukwago	6 November 2004 (age 22)	(Federation of Uganda Football Associations) KCCA
18	GK	Abdu Magada	25 January 2005 (age 21)	(Federation of Uganda Football Associations) Gaddafi FC
19	GK	Oyo Delton	24 November 2003 (age 22)	(Federation of Uganda Football Associations) SC Villa
20	MF	Ivan Irinimbabazi	1 February 2004 (age 22)	(Federation of Uganda Football Associations) Bright Stars FC
21	FW	Magogo Shafiq	15 March 2004 (age 22)	(Federation of Uganda Football Associations) Simba FC
22	MF	Hakim Mutebi	6 January 2006 (age 20)	(Federation of Uganda Football Associations) SC Villa
23	DF	Apollo Kakogwe	18 February 2003 (age 23)	(Federation of Uganda Football Associations) Wakiso Giants FC
24	FW	Patrick Kakande	25 April 2003 (age 23)	(Federation of Uganda Football Associations) SC Villa
25	FW	Rogers Mugisha	6 June 2003 (age 23)	(Federation of Uganda Football Associations) Simba FC

== Current Squad ==
The following players were called up for the CECAFA U-20 Qualifiers 2026 in Dar es salaam, Tanzania by coach Laryea Kingston.

1. Adrian Isabirye - BUL FC
2. Batali Igama - Lugazi FC
3. Mimosa Yashir - University of California
4. Kawuki Hakim - KCCA FC
5. Elvis Opakrwoth - ST Mary's Kitende
6. Wandera Hakim - NEC FC
7. Steven Oyirwoth - UNC Men's Soccer
8. Meddy Mutamba - Busoga United FC
9. Gilbert Ogenrwot - SC Villa
10. Mangoli Raymond - SC Villa
11. Amour Munogera - Vipers SC
12. Owino Brian - Vipers SC JT
13. Isma Magala - Masaka Sunshine
14. Genesis Odiya - NK Tabor Sezana
15. Ashraf Kyakuwa - Vipers SC JT
16. Nkoola Arafat - Vipers SC
17. Okello Richard - BUL FC
18. Joseph Ssenyondwa - AC Amager
19. Ssozi Derrick - Bukedea Comprehensive
20. Wanyama Simon - Bukedea Comprehensive

== See also ==
- Uganda women's national under-20 football team
- Federation of Uganda Football Associations (FUFA)
