= Kenya national under-20 football team =

National under-20 association football team representing Kenya

Kenya U-20
- Nickname: Rising Stars
- Association: Football Kenya Federation (FKF)
- Confederation: CAF (Africa)
- Sub-confederation: CECAFA (Central & East Africa)
- Home stadium: Moi International Sports Centre
First colours	Second colours

U-20 Africa Cup of Nations
- Appearances: 2 (first in 1979)
- Best result: Round 1 (1979)

FIFA U-20 World Cup
- Appearances: None

The Kenya national under-20 football team, nicknamed the Rising Stars, represents Kenya in international youth football competitions. Its primary role is the development of players in preparation for the senior national team. The team competes in a variety of competitions, including the biennial FIFA U-20 World Cup and the U-20 Africa Cup of Nations, which is the top competitions for this age group.

They also participate in the CECAFA U-20 Championship which serves as a qualifier to the U-20 Africa Cup of Nations, winning it twice, in 1971 and 1999, and have been runners-up twice, in 1973 and 2019.

== Honours ==
- CECAFA U-20 Championship:
  - Winners (2): 1975, 1999
  - Runners-up (2): 1973, 2019, 2024

== Competitive record ==
=== FIFA U-20 World Cup record ===
FIFA U-20 World Cup record
Year	Round	GP	W	D^{1}	L	GS	GA
(Tunisia) 1977	Did not qualify						
(Japan) 1979	Did not qualify						
(Australia) 1981	Did not qualify						
(Mexico) 1983	Did not qualify						
(Soviet Union) 1985	Did not qualify						
(Chile) 1987	Did not qualify						
(Saudi Arabia) 1989	Did not qualify						
(Portugal) 1991	Did not qualify						
(Australia) 1993	Did not qualify						
(Qatar) 1995	Did not qualify						
(Malaysia) 1997	Did not qualify						
(Nigeria) 1999	Did not qualify						
(Argentina) 2001	Did not qualify						
(United Arab Emirates) 2003	Did not qualify						
(Netherlands) 2005	Did not qualify						
(Canada) 2007	Did not qualify						
(Egypt) 2009	Did not qualify						
(Colombia) 2011	Did not qualify						
(Turkey) 2013	Did not qualify						
(New Zealand) 2015	Did not qualify						
(South Korea) 2017	Did not qualify						
(Poland) 2019	Did not qualify						
(Argentina) 2023	Did not qualify						
(Chile) 2025	Did not qualify						
(Azerbaijan) (Uzbekistan) 2027	to be determined						
Total	0/25	0	0	0	0	0	0

^{1}Draws include knockout matches decided on penalty kicks.

== Current squad ==
The following players were called up between 27 April – 18 May 2025.

No.	Pos.	Player	Date of birth (age)	Caps	Goals	Club
	GK	Bernard Jairo	30 May 2005 (age 21)	0	0	(Football Kenya Federation) Kariobangi Sharks
	GK	Paul Mumira		0	0	(United States Soccer Federation) IFA New England
	DF	Joseph Bate		0	0	
	DF	Jackson Imbiakha		0	0	
	DF	Humphrey Obina		0	0	(Football Kenya Federation) Muranga'a Seal
	DF	Baron Ochieng	29 December 2005 (age 20)	0	0	(Football Kenya Federation) Sofapaka
	DF	Collins Ochieng	1 January 2007 (age 19)	0	0	(Danish Football Association) Horsens
	DF	Telena Ochieng	7 November 2005 (age 21)	0	0	(Football Kenya Federation) Ulinzi Stars
	DF	Manzur Okwaro	1 January 2006 (age 20)	0	0	(Football Kenya Federation) Kenya Commercial Bank
	DF	Amos Wanjala	28 March 2006 (age 20)	0	0	(Royal Spanish Football Federation) Athletic Club Torrellano
	MF	Humphrey Aroko		0	0	(Football Kenya Federation) Kariobangi Sharks
	MF	Emilio Brian		0	0	(Football Kenya Federation) Ulinzi Stars
	MF	Kevin Wangaya	30 November 2005 (age 20)	0	0	(Albanian Football Federation) Apolonia Fier
	MF	Aldrine Kibet		0	0	
	MF	Kelly Madada	1 January 2006 (age 20)	0	0	(Football Kenya Federation) AFC Leopards
	MF	Irad Mshindi		0	0	
	MF	Andres Odhiambo	12 October 2007 (age 19)	0	0	(Football Kenya Federation) Kariobangi Sharks
	MF	Mark Shaban		0	0	(Football Kenya Federation) Gor Mahia
	FW	Hassan Beja	26 August 2005 (age 21)	0	0	(Football Kenya Federation) AFC Leopards
	FW	William Gitama		0	0	(Football Kenya Federation) Bandari
	FW	Oliver Machaka		0	0	(Football Kenya Federation) Kakamega Homeboyz
	FW	Javan Omondi		0	0	(Football Kenya Federation) Ulinzi Stars
	FW	Ezekieh Omuri		0	0	(Football Kenya Federation) Shabana
	FW	Lawrence Ouma		0	0	
	FW	Elly Owande	16 October 2005 (age 21)	0	0	(United Arab Emirates Football Association) Al-Nasr

== See also ==
- Kenya national football team
- Kenya national under-17 football team
