= 2019 U-20 Africa Cup of Nations qualification =

2019 Africa U-20 Cup of Nations qualification
Tournament details
- Dates: 31 March – 12 August 2018
- Teams: 40 (from 1 confederation)

Tournament statistics
- Matches played: 64
- Goals scored: 149 (2.33 per match)
- Top scorer(s): (Burkina Faso) Abdoul Tapsoba (Gabon) Eric Bekale Biyoghe (Uganda) Steven Mukwala (4 goals each)

The 2019 Africa U-20 Cup of Nations qualification was a men's under-20 football competition which decided the participating teams of the 2019 Africa U-20 Cup of Nations.

Players born 1 January 1999 or later are eligible to participate in the competition. A total of eight teams qualified to play in the final tournament, including Niger who qualified automatically as hosts.

== Teams ==
Apart from Niger, the remaining 53 members of CAF were eligible to enter the qualifying competition, and a total of 40 national teams were in the qualifying draw, which was announced on 26 February 2018.

Final tournament hosts	Bye to second round (16 teams)	First round entrants (24 teams)
**Niger**	Angola; **Burkina Faso**; Cameroon; Congo; Egypt; Gambia; **Ghana**; Guinea; Ivory Coast; Libya; **Mali**; **Nigeria**; **Senegal**; Sudan; **South Africa**; Zambia	Algeria; Benin; Botswana; **Burundi**; DR Congo; Ethiopia; Gabon; Guinea-Bissau; Kenya; Liberia; Malawi; Mauritania; Morocco; Mozambique; Namibia; Rwanda; Seychelles; Sierra Leone; South Sudan; Eswatini (formerly Swaziland); Tanzania; Togo; Tunisia; Uganda

Notes

- Teams in **bold** qualified for the final tournament.

Did not enter

- Cape Verde
- Central African Republic
- Chad
- Comoros
- Djibouti
- Equatorial Guinea
- Eritrea
- Lesotho
- Madagascar
- Mauritius
- São Tomé and Príncipe
- Somalia
- Zimbabwe

== Format ==
Qualification ties are played on a home-and-away two-legged basis. If the aggregate score is tied after the second leg, the away goals rule is applied, and if still tied, the penalty shoot-out (no extra time) is used to determine the winner.

== Schedule ==
The schedule of the qualifying rounds is as follows.

Round	Leg	Date
First round	First leg	30 March – 1 April 2018
First round	Second leg	20–22 April 2018
Second round	First leg	11–13 May 2018
Second round	Second leg	18–20 May 2018
Third round	First leg	13–15 July 2018
Third round	Second leg	20–22 July 2018

== Bracket ==
The bracket of the draw was announced by the CAF on 26 February 2018.

The seven winners of the third round qualify for the final tournament.

First round
Mauritania	2	0	2
Morocco	0	1	1
Guinea	Bye
Guinea-Bissau	1	0	1
Sierra Leone	0	0	0
Nigeria	Bye

Second round
Mauritania	1	2	3 (a)
Guinea	0	3	3
Guinea-Bissau	2	0	2
Nigeria	2	1	3

Third round
Mauritania	1	0	1
Nigeria	1	5	6

First round
Algeria	3	2	5
Tunisia	1	1	2
Ghana	Bye
Gambia	Bye
Liberia	—	—
Benin	—	—	w/o

Second round
Algeria	0	0	0
Ghana	0	2	2
Gambia	2	0	2
Benin	1	2	3

Third round
Ghana	3	1	4
Benin	1	1	2

First round
Burkina Faso	Bye
Libya	Bye
Gabon	4	1	5
Togo	0	2	2
Ivory Coast	Bye

Second round
Burkina Faso	3	3	6
Libya	1	3	4
Gabon	3	0	3
Ivory Coast	0	2	2

Third round
Burkina Faso	3	1	4
Gabon	1	0	1

First round
Kenya	1	0	1
Rwanda	1	0	1 (a)
Zambia	Bye
Ethiopia	0	0	0
Burundi	2	1	3
Sudan	Bye

Second round
Rwanda	0	1	1
Zambia	2	1	3
Burundi	1	2	3
Sudan	1	0	1

Third round
Zambia	1	0	1
Burundi	0	3	3

First round
Uganda	5	3	8
South Sudan	1	0	1
Cameroon	Bye
Tanzania	0	0	0 (6 p)
DR Congo	0	0	0 (5 p)
Mali	Bye

Second round
Uganda	1	0	1 (4 p)
Cameroon	0	1	1 (5 p)
Tanzania	1	1	2
Mali	2	4	6

Third round
Cameroon	1	0	1
Mali	1	3	4

First round
Seychelles	0	0	0
Mozambique	0	6	6
South Africa	Bye
Malawi	0	1	1 (a)
Eswatini	0	1	1
Angola	Bye

Second round
Mozambique	1	0	1
South Africa	1	3	4
Malawi	1	4	5
Angola	2	1	3

Third round
South Africa	0	2	2
Malawi	0	0	0

First round
Botswana	0	1	1 (a)
Namibia	0	1	1
Congo	Bye
Senegal	Bye
Egypt	Bye

Second round
Botswana	1	0	1
Congo	1	3	4
Senegal	0	0	0 (7 p)
Egypt	0	0	0 (6 p)

Third round
Congo	2	1	3
Senegal	2	4	6

== First round ==
Team 1	Agg.	Team 2	1st leg	2nd leg
Mauritania	2–1	Morocco	2–0	0–1
Guinea-Bissau	1–0	Sierra Leone	1–0	0–0
Algeria	5–2	Tunisia	3–1	2–1
Liberia	w/o	Benin	—	—
Gabon	5–2	Togo	4–0	1–2
Kenya	1–1 (a)	Rwanda	1–1	0–0
Ethiopia	0–3	Burundi	0–2	0–1
Uganda	8–1	South Sudan	5–1	3–0
Tanzania	0–0 (6–5 p)	DR Congo	0–0	0–0
Seychelles	0–6	Mozambique	0–0	0–6
Malawi	1–1 (a)	Eswatini	0–0	1–1
Botswana	1–1 (a)	Namibia	0–0	1–1

31 March 2018
16:30 UTC+0

Mauritania	2–0	Morocco
Teguedi 17'; Kamara 70'	Report

Stade Olympique, Nouakchott
Referee: Mohamed Eid Mansour (Egypt)
21 April 2018
16:00 UTC+1

Morocco	1–0	Mauritania
Khalid 76' (pen.)	Report

Complexe Moulay El Hassan, Rabat
Referee: Bakary Camara (Gambia)

Mauritania won 2–1 on aggregate.

1 April 2018
17:00 UTC+0

Guinea-Bissau	1–0	Sierra Leone
Ricciulli 13'	Report

Estádio 24 de Setembro, Bissau
Referee: Alioune Sow Sandigui (Senegal)
21 April 2018
16:40 UTC+0

Sierra Leone	0–0	Guinea-Bissau
	Report

Bo Stadium, Bo
Referee: Ayensu Afful Isaka (Ghana)

Guinea-Bissau won 1–0 on aggregate.

31 March 2018
18:00 UTC+1

Algeria	3–1	Tunisia
Zorgane 12' (pen.); Zerrouki 40'; Khemissi 54' (o.g.)	Report	Hamza 41'

20 August Stadium, Algiers
Referee: Adil Zourak (Morocco)
21 April 2018
15:30 UTC+1

Tunisia	1–2	Algeria
Hamza 45'	Report	Belaïd 15'; Zerdoum 82'

Stade Olympique de Radès, Radès
Referee: Abdulwahid Huraywidah (Libya)

Algeria won 5–2 on aggregate.

30 March 2018

Liberia	Cancelled	Benin
	Report

Referee: Thomas Kangoma (Sierra Leone)
22 April 2018
16:00 UTC+1

Benin	Cancelled	Liberia
	Report

Stade de l'Amitié, Cotonou
Referee: Salisu Basheer (Nigeria)

Benin won on walkover after Liberia withdrew.

1 April 2018
15:30 UTC+1

Gabon	4–0	Togo
Biyoghe 15'; Ndong 19', 24'; Miyogho 47'	Report

Stade Augustin Monédan de Sibang, Libreville
Referee: Numbi Pierre Kibingo (DR Congo)
22 April 2018
15:30 UTC+0

Togo	2–1	Gabon
Yannick 72'; Akoro 76'	Report	Biyoghe 89' (pen.)

Stade Municipal, Lomé
Referee: Mohamed Ali Moussa (Niger)

Gabon won 5–2 on aggregate.

1 April 2018
15:00 UTC+3

Kenya	1–1	Rwanda
Odada 7'	Report	Byiringiro 90+2'

Kenyatta Stadium, Machakos
Referee: Biruk Yemanabran Kassaun (Ethiopia)
21 April 2018
15:30 UTC+2

Rwanda	0–0	Kenya
	Report

Stade Régional Nyamirambo, Kigali
Referee: Tsegay Mogos Teklu (Eritrea)

1–1 on aggregate. Rwanda won on away goals.

1 April 2018
16:00 UTC+3

Ethiopia	0–2	Burundi
	Report	Muhamedi 3'; Shaka 22'

Addis Ababa Stadium, Addis Ababa
Referee: Mohamed Nur Muhudin (Somalia)
21 April 2018
15:00 UTC+2

Burundi	1–0	Ethiopia
Shaka 84'	Report

Stade Urukundo, Ngozi
Referee: Saddam Houssein Mansour (Djibouti)

Burundi won 3–0 on aggregate.

31 March 2018
16:00 UTC+3

Uganda	5–1	South Sudan
Kizza 25' (pen.); Mukwala 65'; Masereka 69'; Tibita 87'; Okello 89'	Report	Mujuzi 30' (o.g.)

Phillip Omondi Stadium, Kampala
Referee: Adel Mukhtar Adam (Sudan)
21 April 2018
16:00 UTC+3

South Sudan	0–3	Uganda
	Report	Mukwala 52', 70'; Okello 74'

Juba Stadium, Juba
Referee: Georges Gatogato (Burundi)

Uganda won 8–1 on aggregate.

31 March 2018
16:00 UTC+3

Tanzania	0–0	DR Congo
	Report

National Stadium, Dar es Salaam
Referee: William Oloya (Uganda)
22 April 2018
15:30 UTC+1

DR Congo	0–0	Tanzania
	Report
Penalties
Patsheli (penalty missed)	5–6	Penalty scored

Stade des Martyrs, Kinshasa
Referee: Fitial Charel Kokolo (Congo)

0–0 on aggregate. Tanzania won 6–5 on penalties.

31 March 2018
16:30 UTC+4

Seychelles	0–0	Mozambique
	Report

Stade Linité, Victoria
Referee: Ganesh Chutooree (Mauritius)
21 April 2018
15:00 UTC+2

Mozambique	6–0	Seychelles
Pestana 5', 25'; Nhantumbo 7'; Gimo 38'; Kamo-Kamo 63'; Rosebette 83'	Report

Estádio do Zimpeto, Maputo
Referee: Tirelo Mositwane (Botswana)

Mozambique won 6–0 on aggregate.

31 March 2018
14:30 UTC+2

Malawi	0–0	Swaziland
	Report

Kamuzu Stadium, Blantyre
Referee: Pilan Ncube (Zimbabwe)
22 April 2018
15:00 UTC+2

Eswatini	1–1	Malawi
Manyisa 36'	Report	Maonga 14'

Somhlolo Stadium, Lobamba
Referee: Nelson Emile Fred (Seychelles)

1–1 on aggregate. Malawi won on away goals.

31 March 2018
16:00 UTC+2

Botswana	0–0	Namibia
	Report

National Stadium, Gaborone
Referee: Andofetra Rakotojaona (Madagascar)
22 April 2018
15:00 UTC+2

Namibia	1–1	Botswana
Muzeu 77'	Report	Khuduga 47'

Sam Nujoma Stadium, Windhoek
Referee: Retselisitsoe Molise (Lesotho)

1–1 on aggregate. Botswana won on away goals.

== Second round ==
Team 1	Agg.	Team 2	1st leg	2nd leg
Mauritania	3–3 (a)	Guinea	1–0	2–3
Guinea-Bissau	2–3	Nigeria	2–2	0–1
Algeria	0–2	Ghana	0–0	0–2
Gambia	2–3	Benin	2–1	0–2
Burkina Faso	6–4	Libya	3–1	3–3
Gabon	3–2	Ivory Coast	3–0	0–2
Rwanda	1–3	Zambia	0–2	1–1
Burundi	3–1	Sudan	1–1	2–0
Uganda	1–1 (4–5 p)	Cameroon	1–0	0–1
Tanzania	2–6	Mali	1–2	1–4
Mozambique	1–4	South Africa	1–1	0–3
Malawi	5–3	Angola	1–2	4–1
Botswana	1–4	Congo	1–1	0–3
Senegal	0–0 (7–6 p)	Egypt	0–0	0–0

12 May 2018
17:00 UTC+0

Mauritania	1–0	Guinea
Kamara 27'	Report

Stade Olympique, Nouakchott
Referee: Jerry S. Yekeh (Liberia)
19 May 2018
16:30 UTC+0

Guinea	3–2	Mauritania
S. Camara 16', 52'; Ag. Camara 25' (pen.)	Report	El Id 75' (pen.); Traoré 84'

Stade du 28 Septembre, Conakry
Referee: Slim Belkhouas (Tunisia)

3–3 on aggregate. Mauritania won on away goals.

12 May 2018
16:00 UTC+0

Guinea-Bissau	2–2	Nigeria
Pereira 53', 62'	Report	Alalade 28', 34'

Estádio 24 de Setembro, Bissau
Referee: Fabricio Duarte (Cape Verde)
20 May 2018
16:00 UTC+1

Nigeria	1–0	Guinea-Bissau
Alhassan 58' (pen.)	Report

U. J. Esuene Stadium, Calabar
Referee: Kouassi Attisso Attiogbe (Togo)

Nigeria won 3–2 on aggregate.

11 May 2018
18:00 UTC+1

Algeria	0–0	Ghana
	Report

Stade du 5 Juillet, Algiers
Referee: Abou Coulibaly (Ivory Coast)
20 May 2018
15:00 UTC+0

Ghana	2–0	Algeria
Kudus 36'; Sadiq 46'	Report

Cape Coast Sports Stadium, Cape Coast
Referee: Boubou Traore (Mali)

Ghana won 2–0 on aggregate.

13 May 2018
16:30 UTC+0

Gambia	2–1	Benin
Jammeh 1'; Colley 34'	Report	Ogoulola 45'

Independence Stadium, Bakau
Referee: Reinaldo Domingos Barbosa (Guinea-Bissau)
20 May 2018
16:00 UTC+1

Benin	2–0	Gambia
Akinyoola 11', 49'	Report

Stade René Pleven d'Akpakpa, Cotonou
Referee: Babacar Sarr (Mauritania)

Benin won 3–2 on aggregate.

12 May 2018
16:00 UTC+0

Burkina Faso	3–1	Libya
Tapsoba 10'; Diarrassouba 89', 90'	Report	Elkout 32'

Stade du 4 Août, Ouagadougou
Referee: Raymond Coker (Sierra Leone)
20 May 2018
22:00 UTC+1

Libya	3–3	Burkina Faso
Shaldun 23', 64'; Elkout 60' (pen.)	Report	Ouattara 29' (pen.); Ripama 43'; Nikiema 62'

Stade Olympique de Sousse, Sousse (Tunisia) (Note: Libya played their home leg in Tunisia due to the Libyan Civil War.)
Referee: Elsiddig Mohamed Eltreefe (Sudan)

Burkina Faso won 6–4 on aggregate.

12 May 2018
15:30 UTC+1

Gabon	3–0	Ivory Coast
Ndong 9'; Miyogho 17'; Biyoghe 43'	Report

Stade Augustin Monédan de Sibang, Libreville
Referee: Alhadi Allaou Mahamat (Chad)
19 May 2018
16:00 UTC+0

Ivory Coast	2–0	Gabon
Kombila 4' (o.g.); Singo 85'	Report

Stade Félix Houphouët-Boigny, Abidjan
Referee: Blaise Yuven Ngwa (Cameroon)

Gabon won 3–2 on aggregate.

12 May 2018
15:30 UTC+2

Rwanda	0–2	Zambia
	Report	Mwepu 33', 79'

Stade Régional Nyamirambo, Kigali
Referee: Jean Marc Ganamandji (Central African Republic)
19 May 2018
15:00 UTC+2

Zambia	1–1	Rwanda
Malumo 53'	Report	Marie 70'

Nkoloma Stadium, Lusaka
Referee: Christopher Harrison (South Africa)

Zambia won 3–1 on aggregate.

12 May 2018
15:00 UTC+2

Burundi	1–1	Sudan
Muhamedi 23'	Report	Yaqoub 29'

Stade Urukundo, Ngozi
Referee: Mihindou Mbina Gauthier (Gabon)
20 May 2018
21:30 UTC+2

Sudan	0–2	Burundi
	Report	Shaka 85'; Mavugo 90'

Al-Hilal Stadium, Omdurman
Referee: Adissa Abdul Raphiou Ligali (Benin)

Burundi won 3–1 on aggregate.

12 May 2018
16:00 UTC+3

Uganda	1–0	Cameroon
Mukwala 44'	Report

Phillip Omondi Stadium, Kampala
Referee: Peter Waweru (Kenya)
18 May 2018
15:30 UTC+1

Cameroon	1–0	Uganda
Nkeng 67' (pen.)	Report
Penalties
Nkeng (penalty scored)	5–4	(penalty scored) Kizza; (penalty scored) Poloto; (penalty scored) Wasswa; (penalty scored) Okello; (penalty missed) Willa

Stade Ahmadou Ahidjo, Yaoundé
Referee: Adaari Abdul Latif (Ghana)

1–1 on aggregate. Cameroon won 5–4 on penalties.

13 May 2018
16:00 UTC+3

Tanzania	1–2	Mali
Kasunda 43'	Report	Diakité 33'; Samnadjaré 40'

National Stadium, Dar es Salaam
Referee: Soulaimane Ansudane (Comoros)
20 May 2018
17:00 UTC+0

Mali	4–1	Tanzania
Dramé 38'; Samnadjaré 48' (pen.); Samaké 63'; Traoré 66'	Report	Kiyombo 61'

Stade Modibo Kéïta, Bamako
Referee: Lotfi Bekoussa (Algeria)

Mali won 6–2 on aggregate.

12 May 2018
15:00 UTC+2

Mozambique	1–1	South Africa
Kamo-Kamo 82'	Report	Matthews 60'

Estádio do Ferroviário, Beira
Referee: Messie Nkounkou Mvoutou (Congo)
20 May 2018
15:00 UTC+2

South Africa	3–0	Mozambique
Meyiwa 9'; Foster 32', 66'	Report

Moruleng Stadium, Saulspoort
Referee: Mfaume Ali Nassoro (Tanzania)

South Africa won 4–1 on aggregate.

12 May 2018
14:30 UTC+2

Malawi	1–2	Angola
Banda 77'	Report	Gelson 1'; Aisson 65'

Kamuzu Stadium, Blantyre
Referee: Ring Nyier Akech Malong (South Sudan)
20 May 2018
15:30 UTC+1

Angola	1–4	Malawi
Vanilson 48'	Report	Kadzinje 8'; Kadzongola 18'; Mbeta 28' (pen.); Banda 45'

Estádio dos Coqueiros, Luanda
Referee: Abdullahi Shuaibu (Nigeria)

Malawi won 5–3 on aggregate.

12 May 2018
15:00 UTC+2

Botswana	1–1	Congo
Khuduga 18'	Report	Louamba 89'

Botswana National Stadium, Gaborone
Referee: Antonio Caluassi Dungula (Angola)
20 May 2018
15:30 UTC+1

Congo	3–0	Botswana
Velaphi 2' (o.g.); Okouri 49'; Louamba 54'	Report

Stade Alphonse Massemba-Débat, Brazzaville
Referee: Samuel Uwikunda (Rwanda)

Congo won 4–1 on aggregate.

12 May 2018
17:00 UTC+0

Senegal	0–0	Egypt
	Report

Stade Léopold Sédar Senghor, Dakar
Referee: Juste Ephrem Zio (Burkina Faso)
19 May 2018
21:30 UTC+2

Egypt	0–0	Senegal
	Report
Penalties
Bassiouni (penalty missed)	6–7	Penalty scored

Al Masry Club Stadium, Port Said
Referee: Thierry Nkurunziza (Burundi)

0–0 on aggregate. Senegal won 7–6 on penalties.

== Third round ==
Winners qualify for 2019 Africa U-20 Cup of Nations.

Team 1	Agg.	Team 2	1st leg	2nd leg
Mauritania	1–6	Nigeria	1–1	0–5
Ghana	4–2	Benin	3–1	1–1
Burkina Faso	4–1	Gabon	3–1	1–0
Zambia	1–3	Burundi	1–0	0–3
Cameroon	1–4	Mali	1–1	0–3
South Africa	2–0	Malawi	0–0	2–0
Congo	3–6	Senegal	2–2	1–4

14 July 2018
17:00 UTC+0

Mauritania	1–1	Nigeria
Salem 11'	Report	Ibrahim 8'

Stade Olympique, Nouakchott
Referee: Messie Jessie Oved Nkounkou Mvoutou (Congo)
21 July 2018
16:00 UTC+1

Nigeria	5–0	Mauritania
Alalade 12'; Yahaya 33', 46'; Okon 67'; Afeez 90+1' (pen.)	Report

Agege Stadium, Lagos
Referee: Mahmoud El Banna (Egypt)

Nigeria won 6–1 on aggregate.

4 August 2018 (Note: The first leg between Ghana and Benin was postponed to 4 August due to the impasse between the Ghana Football Association and the government. The second leg was also moved to the following weekend.)
15:00 UTC+0

Ghana	3–1	Benin
Danso 60', 84'; Konda 72'	Report	Saliou 28'

Cape Coast Sports Stadium, Cape Coast
Referee: Nabil Boukhalfa (Algeria)
12 August 2018
16:00 UTC+1

Benin	1–1	Ghana
Chabi 55'	Report	Ahiabu 85'

Stade René Pleven d'Akpakpa, Cotonou
Referee: Bienvenu Sinko (Ivory Coast)

Ghana won 4–2 on aggregate.

14 July 2018
16:00 UTC+0

Burkina Faso	3–1	Gabon
Botué 3'; Tapsoba 9', 34'	Report	Biyoghe 33'

Stade du 4 Août, Ouagadougou
Referee: Beida Dahane (Mauritania)
21 July 2018
15:30 UTC+1

Gabon	0–1	Burkina Faso
	Report	Tapsoba 65'

Stade Augustin Monédan de Sibang, Libreville
Referee: Mahmood Ali Mahmood Ismail (Sudan)

Burkina Faso won 4–1 on aggregate.

14 July 2018
15:00 UTC+2

Zambia	1–0	Burundi
Banda 87'	Report

Nkoloma Stadium, Lusaka
Referee: Antoine Effa Essouma (Cameroon)
22 July 2018
15:00 UTC+2

Burundi	3–0	Zambia
Ramazani 44'; Muryango 49'; Kanakimana 55'	Report

Stade Urukundo, Ngozi
Referee: Alex Muhabi (Uganda)

Burundi won 3–1 on aggregate.

14 July 2018
15:30 UTC+1

Cameroon	1–1	Mali
Sakava 60'	Report	Touré 62'

Stade Ahmadou Ahidjo, Yaoundé
Referee: Ganesh Chutooree (Mauritius)
22 July 2018
17:00 UTC+0

Mali	3–0	Cameroon
Dramé 28'; Touré 57' (pen.); Camara 77'	Report

Stade Modibo Kéïta, Bamako
Referee: Samir Guezzaz (Morocco)

Mali won 4–1 on aggregate.

15 July 2018
15:00 UTC+2

South Africa	0–0	Malawi
	Report

Moruleng Stadium, Saulspoort
Referee: Celso Alvação (Mozambique)
21 July 2018
14:30 UTC+2

Malawi	0–2	South Africa
	Report	Kodisang 14'; Monyane 84'

Kamuzu Stadium, Blantyre
Referee: Andofetra Rakotojaona (Madagascar)

South Africa won 2–0 on aggregate.

13 July 2018
15:30 UTC+1

Congo	2–2	Senegal
Mboungou 6'; Tomandzoto 84'	Report	Sagna 23'; Badji 62'

Stade Alphonse Massemba-Débat, Brazzaville
Referee: Wisdom Chewe (Zambia)
21 July 2018
17:00 UTC+0

Senegal	4–1	Congo
Badji 36'; Diagne 42'; Lopy 49'; Niang 79'	Report	Louamba 88'

Stade Léopold Sédar Senghor, Dakar
Referee: Haythem Guirat (Tunisia)

Senegal won 6–3 on aggregate.

== Qualified teams ==
The following eight teams qualify for the final tournament.

Team	Qualified on	Previous appearances in Africa U-20 Cup of Nations^{1} only final tournament era (since 1991)
Niger (hosts)	26 May 2015	0 (debut)
Nigeria	21 July 2018	10 (1993, 1995, 1999, 2001, **2005**, 2007, 2009, **2011**, 2013, **2015**)
Ghana	12 August 2018	10 (1991, **1993**, 1997, **1999**, 2001, 2003, **2009**, 2011, 2013, 2015)
Burkina Faso	21 July 2018	2 (2003, 2007)
Burundi	22 July 2018	1 (1995)
Mali	22 July 2018	11 (1995, 1997, 1999, 2001, 2003, 2005, 2009, 2011, 2013, 2015, 2017)
South Africa	21 July 2018	7 (1997, 2001, 2003, 2009, 2011, 2015, 2017)
Senegal	21 July 2018	4 (1993, 1995, 2015, 2017)

^{1} Bold indicates champions for that year. Italic indicates hosts for that year.

== Goalscorers ==
4 goals

- (Burkina Faso) Abdoul Tapsoba
- (Gabon) Eric Bekale Biyoghe
- (Uganda) Steven Mukwala

3 goals

- (Burundi) Bienvenue Shaka
- (Republic of the Congo) Racine Louamba
- (Gabon) Gabriel Ndong
- (Nigeria) Wasiu Alalade

2 goals

- (Benin) Samson Akinyoola
- (Botswana) Thabang Khuduga
- (Burkina Faso) Salifou Diarrassouba
- (Burundi) Djuma Muhamedi
- (Gabon) Alain Miyogho
- (Ghana) Richard Danso
- (Guinea) Sékou Camara
- (Guinea-Bissau) Mada Pereira
- (Libya) Elmahdi Elkout
- (Libya) Jihad Shaldun
- (Malawi) Peter Banda
- (Mali) Hadji Dramé
- (Mali) Diadié Samnadjaré
- (Mali) El Bilal Touré
- (Mauritania) Cheikh Ahmed Kamara
- (Mozambique) Kamo-Kamo
- (Mozambique) Francisco Pestana
- (Nigeria) Nazifi Yahaya
- (Senegal) Youssouph Badji
- (South Africa) Lyle Foster
- (Tunisia) Yosri Hamza
- (Uganda) Allan Okello
- (Zambia) Francisco Mwepu

1 goal

- (Algeria) Zineddine Belaïd
- (Algeria) Redouane Zerdoum
- (Algeria) Merouane Zerrouki
- (Algeria) Adem Zorgane
- (Angola) Aisson
- (Angola) Gelson
- (Angola) Vanilson
- (Benin) Odo Chabi
- (Benin) Ibrahim Ogoulola
- (Benin) Allagbani Saliou
- (Burkina Faso) Kouamé Botué
- (Burkina Faso) Kalifa Nikiema
- (Burkina Faso) Djibril Ouattara
- (Burkina Faso) Abdoul Abbase Ripama
- (Burundi) Bienvenue Kanakimana
- (Burundi) Titi Mavugo
- (Burundi) Moussa Muryango
- (Burundi) Pascal Ramazani
- (Cameroon) Taddeus Nkeng
- (Cameroon) Moïse Sakava
- (Republic of the Congo) Prestige Mboungou
- (Republic of the Congo) Roland Okouri
- (Republic of the Congo) Borel Tomandzoto
- (The Gambia) Ebrima Colley
- (The Gambia) Adama Jammeh
- (Ghana) Prosper Ahiabu
- (Ghana) Ibrahim Sadiq
- (Ghana) Ishaku Konda
- (Ghana) Mohammed Kudus
- (Guinea) Aguibou Camara
- (Guinea-Bissau) João Ricciulli
- (Ivory Coast) Wilfried Singo
- (Kenya) Richard Odada
- (Malawi) Kelvin Kadzinje
- (Malawi) Auspicious Kadzongola
- (Malawi) Chinsinsi Maonga
- (Malawi) Chikondi Mbeta
- (Mali) Mohamed Camara
- (Mali) Ousmane Diakité
- (Mali) Mamadou Samaké
- (Mali) Mamadou Traoré
- (Mauritania) Abdou El Id
- (Mauritania) Mohamed Salem
- (Mauritania) El Hassen Teguedi
- (Mauritania) Fody Traoré
- (Morocco) Driss Khalid
- (Mozambique) Rui Antonio Gimo
- (Mozambique) Jochua Nhantumbo
- (Mozambique) Obasi Rosebette
- (Namibia) Bethuel Muzeu
- (Nigeria) Aremu Afeez
- (Nigeria) Adamu Alhassan
- (Nigeria) Abubakar Ibrahim
- (Nigeria) Aniekeme Okon
- (Rwanda) Lague Byiringiro
- (Rwanda) Gueulette Marie
- (Senegal) Ousseynou Diagné
- (Senegal) Dion Lopy
- (Senegal) Ousseynou Niang
- (Senegal) Amadou Sagna
- (South Africa) Kobamelo Kodisang
- (South Africa) Tashreeq Matthews
- (South Africa) Wiseman Meyiwa
- (South Africa) Thabiso Monyane
- (Sudan) Walaa Eldin Yaqoub
- (Eswatini) Leon Manyisa
- (Tanzania) Paul Peter Kasunda
- (Tanzania) Habibu Kiyombo
- (Togo) Bilal Akoro
- (Togo) Komla Yannick
- (Uganda) Mustafa Kizza
- (Uganda) Sadam Masereka
- (Uganda) Hamisi Tibita
- (Zambia) Lameck Banda
- (Zambia) Mwiya Malumo

1 own goal

- (Botswana) Alford Velaphi (against Congo)
- (Gabon) Kelly Kombila (against Ivory Coast)
- (Tunisia) Sanad Khemissi (against Algeria)
- (Uganda) Musitafa Mujuzi (against South Sudan)
