= 2008 WAFU U-20 Championship =

2008 WAFU Under 20 Championship
West Africa Football Union Under 20 Championship

Tournament details
- Host country: Nigeria
- City: Delta State
- Dates: 30 November - 14 December
- Teams: 14

Final positions
- Champions: Ghana
- Runners-up: Senegal
- Third place: Ivory Coast
- Fourth place: Burkina Faso

The first WAFU Under-20 Championship took place in Nigeria. The tournament is sometimes referred to as the Ibori Cup and is contested by countries in the West Africa region.

== Eligible Participants ==
- Benin
- Burkina Faso
- Cape Verde (withdrew)
- Ivory Coast
- Gambia
- Ghana
- Guinea
- Guinea-Bissau (withdrew)
- Liberia
- Mali
- Mauritania
- Niger
- Nigeria
- Senegal
- Sierra Leone
- Togo

== Group A ==
29 November 2008

| Nigeria | 2 - 0 | Togo |

1 December 2008

| Nigeria | 1 - 0 | Benin |

3 December 2008

| Togo | 1 - 1 | Benin |

| Team | Pld | W | D | L | GF | GA | GD | Pts |
|---|---|---|---|---|---|---|---|---|
| Nigeria | 2 | 2 | 0 | 0 | 3 | 0 | +3 | 6 |
| Benin | 2 | 0 | 1 | 0 | 1 | 2 | -1 | 1 |
| Togo | 2 | 0 | 1 | 0 | 1 | 3 | -2 | 1 |

== Group B ==
29 November 2008

| Ghana | 2 - 0 | Senegal |

29 November 2008

| Gambia | 1 - 1 | Guinea |

Referee: Aly Lemghaifry (Mauritania)
1 December 2008

| Ghana | 2 - 1 | Guinea |

2 December 2008

| Gambia | 0 - 2 | Senegal |

4 December 2008

| Guinea | 0 - 0 | Senegal |

4 December 2008

| Ghana | 1 - 0 | Gambia |

| Team | Pld | W | D | L | GF | GA | GD | Pts |
|---|---|---|---|---|---|---|---|---|
| Ghana | 3 | 3 | 0 | 0 | 5 | 1 | 4 | 9 |
| Senegal | 3 | 1 | 1 | 1 | 2 | 2 | 0 | 4 |
| Guinea | 3 | 0 | 2 | 1 | 2 | 3 | -1 | 2 |
| Gambia | 3 | 0 | 1 | 2 | 1 | 4 | -3 | 1 |

== Group C ==
29 November 2008

| Ivory Coast | 0 - 1 | Burkina Faso |

29 November 2008

| Sierra Leone | 2 - 0 | Mauritania |

1 December 2008

| Burkina Faso | 0 - 2 | Sierra Leone |

2 December 2008

| Ivory Coast | 4 - 1 | Mauritania |

4 December 2008

| Ivory Coast | 1 - 0 | Sierra Leone |

4 December 2008

| Burkina Faso | 4 - 0 | Mauritania |

| Team | Pld | W | D | L | GF | GA | GD | Pts |
|---|---|---|---|---|---|---|---|---|
| Burkina Faso | 3 | 2 | 0 | 1 | 5 | 2 | 3 | 6 |
| Ivory Coast | 3 | 2 | 0 | 1 | 5 | 2 | 3 | 6 |
| Sierra Leone | 3 | 2 | 0 | 1 | 4 | 1 | 3 | 6 |
| Mauritania | 3 | 0 | 0 | 3 | 1 | 10 | -9 | 0 |

== Group D ==
29 November 2008

| Niger | 1 - 1 | Liberia |

1 December 2008

| Mali | 1 - 1 | Liberia |

Referee: Aly Lemghaifry (Mauritania)
3 December 2008

| Mali | 1 - 0 | Niger |

| Team | Pld | W | D | L | GF | GA | GD | Pts |
|---|---|---|---|---|---|---|---|---|
| Mali | 2 | 1 | 0 | 0 | 0 | 0 | 1 | 4 |
| Liberia | 2 | 0 | 2 | 0 | 2 | 2 | 0 | 2 |
| Niger | 2 | 0 | 1 | 1 | 1 | 2 | -1 | 1 |

== Quarter finals ==
6 December 2008

| Nigeria | 1 - 1 | Senegal |
Penalties
| | 3 - 5 |

6 December 2008

| Ghana | 1 - 0 | Benin |

6 December 2008

| Burkina Faso | 4 - 0 | Liberia |

6 December 2008

| Mali | 1 - 2 | Ivory Coast |

== Semi finals ==
8 December 2008

| Senegal | 4 - 1 | Ivory Coast |

8 December 2008

| Ghana | 2 - 1 | Burkina Faso |

== Third place match ==
10 December 2008

| Ivory Coast | 2 - 0 | Burkina Faso |

== Final ==
10 December 2008

| Ghana | 1 - 1 | Senegal |
|---|---|---|
| | | Oghara Township Stadium |
Penalties
| | 3 - 2 |

Oghara

== See also ==
- WAFU U-20 Championship
