= Football at the 2005 Jeux de la Francophonie =

2005 Football at the Jeux de la Francophonie
Tournament details
- Host country: Niger
- City: Niamey
- Dates: 5 December - 17 December
- Teams: 12 (from 3 confederations)
- Venue: 1 (in 1 host city)

Final positions
- Champions: Ivory Coast (1st title)
- Runners-up: Senegal
- Third place: Burkina Faso
- Fourth place: Cameroon

Tournament statistics
- Matches played: 26
- Goals scored: 73 (2.81 per match)
- All statistics correct as of 12 July 2010.

Les Jeux de la francophonie sont une manifestation multisports organisée tous les quatre ans entre les athlètes des pays dont le français est la langue officielle ou l'une des langues officielles. Les Jeux de la francophonie 2005 ont eu lieu à Niamey, au Niger, du 8 au 17 décembre 2005. Je ne suis pas sûr qu'il y ait eu un tournoi de football (soccer) aux Jeux de la francophonie 2005.

Each nation brought their under-20 teams to compete in a group and knockout tournament. The top two teams and the two best second placed teams advanced to the knockout stage of the competition. Côte d'Ivoire won the tournament after a 3-0 win over Senegal.

== Group stage ==
=== Group A ===
Team	Pld	W	D	L	GF	GA	GD	Pts
Burkina Faso	3	2	0	1	8	4	+4	6
Mali	3	2	0	1	7	5	+2	6
France	3	2	0	1	4	4	0	6
Haiti	3	0	0	3	2	8	−6	0

Le Burkina Faso a remporté les Jeux de la Francophonie 2005 et comme mentionné ici.

2005-12-05

Burkina Faso	3 – 1	Mali

2005-12-07

Mali	3 – 0	France

2005-12-07

Burkina Faso	4 – 0	Haiti

2005-12-09

France	3 – 1	Burkina Faso

2005-12-09

Mali	3 – 2	Haiti

2005-12-11

France	1 – 0	Haiti

=== Group B ===
Team	Pld	W	D	L	GF	GA	GD	Pts
Senegal	3	3	0	0	8	0	+8	9
DR Congo	3	2	0	1	5	4	+1	6
Morocco	3	1	0	2	4	4	0	3
Lithuania (Note: Withdrew)	3	0	0	3	0	9	−9	0

Notes:
2005-12-05

Senegal	3 – 0	DR Congo

2005-12-05

Morocco	3 – 0 (forfeit)	Lithuania

2005-12-08

DR Congo	3 – 0 (forfeit)	Lithuania

2005-12-08

Senegal	2 – 0	Morocco

2005-12-10

DR Congo	2 – 1	Morocco

2005-12-10

Senegal	3 – 0 (forfeit)	Lithuania

=== Group C ===
Team	Pld	W	D	L	GF	GA	GD	Pts
Cameroon	3	2	1	0	7	1	+6	7
Ivory Coast	3	2	1	0	5	1	+4	7
Niger	3	1	0	2	8	6	+2	3
Canada	3	0	0	3	1	13	−12	0

2005-12-06

Ivory Coast	3 – 1	Niger

2005-12-06

Cameroon	5 – 0	Canada
21'; 36'; 54'; 79'; 82'

2005-12-08

Niger	6 – 1	Canada
1'; 4'; 28'; 63'; 82'; 89'		Elliott 90'

2005-12-08

Ivory Coast	0 – 0	Cameroon

2005-12-10

Cameroon	2 – 1	Niger

2005-12-10

Ivory Coast	2 – 0	Canada
Teko 43'; Barry 64'

== Knockout stage ==
Quarter-finals
12 December -
Ivory Coast	1
DR Congo	0
12 December -
Burkina Faso	1
Niger	0
13 December -
France	0
Senegal	2
13 December -
Cameroon	3
Mali	1

Semi-finals
15 December -
Ivory Coast	2
Burkina Faso	1
15 December -
Senegal	1
Cameroon	0

Final
17 December -
Ivory Coast	3
Senegal	0
Third place
17 December -
Burkina Faso	0 (5)
Cameroon	0 (4)

== See also ==
Football at the Jeux de la Francophonie
