= Football at the 1994 Jeux de la Francophonie =

1994 Football at the Jeux de la Francophonie
Tournament details
- Host country: France
- City: Paris
- Dates: 5 July - 13 July
- Teams: 9 (from 3 confederations)
- Venue: 4 (in 1 host city)

Final positions
- Champions: France (1st title)
- Runners-up: Egypt
- Third place: Congo
- Fourth place: Morocco

Tournament statistics
- Matches played: 13
- Goals scored: 48 (3.69 per match)
- All statistics correct as of 30 August 2010.

Each nation brought their under-20 teams to compete in a group and knockout tournament. The top teams and the best second placed team advanced to the knockout stage of the competition. France won the tournament after defeating Egypt 3-2.

== Group stage ==
=== Group A ===
Team	Pld	W	D	L	GF	GA	GD	Pts
Morocco	2	2	0	0	3	2	+1	6
Mauritius	2	1	0	1	4	4	0	3
Cameroon	2	0	0	2	1	2	−1	0

Morocco	3 – 2	Mauritius

Morocco	w/o	Cameroon

Mauritius	2 – 1	Cameroon

=== Group B ===
Team	Pld	W	D	L	GF	GA	GD	Pts
France	2	1	1	0	3	2	+1	4
Congo	2	1	0	1	8	3	+5	3
Gabon	2	0	1	1	4	10	−6	1

France	1 – 0	Congo

France	2 – 2	Gabon

Congo	8 – 2	Gabon

=== Group C ===
Team	Pld	W	D	L	GF	GA	GD	Pts
Egypt	2	1	1	0	4	2	+2	4
Canada	2	1	0	1	6	5	+1	3
Guinea-Bissau	2	0	1	1	3	4	−1	1

Egypt	3 – 1	Canada
		Franks

Egypt	1 – 1	Guinea-Bissau

Canada	5 – 2	Guinea-Bissau
Franks; Elligott; Rhode; Tremarco; Wood		Goal

== Knockout stage ==
Semi-finals
-
Egypt	2
Congo	1
-
France	2
Morocco	1

Final
July 13- Bondoufle
Egypt	2
France	3
Third place
-
Congo	2
Morocco	1

== See also ==
- Football at the Jeux de la Francophonie
