= 2003 African Youth Championship =

Coupe d'Afrique des nations junior 2003

Tournament details
- Host country: Burkina Faso
- City: Ouagadougou, Bobo Dioulasso
- Dates: 4–18 January
- Teams: 8 (from CAF confederations)
- Venue: 2 (in 2 host cities)

Final positions
- Champions: Egypt (3rd title)
- Runners-up: Ivory Coast
- Third place: Mali
- Fourth place: Burkina Faso

Tournament statistics
- Matches played: 16
- Goals scored: 43 (2.69 per match)
- Top scorer: (Egypt) Emad Moteab (5 goals)

The 2003 African Youth Championship was an association football tournament for under-20 players (born in 1983 and before). It was held in Burkina Faso from January 4 until January 18. The top four teams qualified for the 2003 FIFA World Youth Championship.

== Qualification ==
=== Preliminary round ===
The first leg was played on either 6, 7 or 8 April 2002. The second leg was held on either 19, 20 or 21 April 2002. The winners advanced to the First Round.

Team 1	Agg.	Team 2	1st leg	2nd leg
Togo	4–1	Chad	3–0	1–1
Equatorial Guinea	0–6	Gabon	0–1	0–5
Burundi	2–3	Tanzania	1–0	1–3
Sudan	4–4(3-4)(PSO)	Uganda	3–1	1–3
Zimbabwe	3–1	Swaziland	1–0	2–1
Namibia	2–3	Botswana	1–0	1–3
Guinea-Bissau	w/o	Liberia	w/o	w/o
Cameroon	w/o	São Tomé and Príncipe	w/o	w/o
Somalia	w/o	Kenya	w/o	w/o
Mauritania	w/o	Sierra Leone	w/o	w/o
Mauritius	w/o	Madagascar	w/o	w/o

=== First round ===
The First Round first leg matches were held on 20 and 21 July 2002. The second leg matches were held on 10 and 11 August 2002. The winners qualified for the Second Round.

Team 1	Agg.	Team 2	1st leg	2nd leg
Angola	1–1(1-4)(PK)	Togo	1–0	0-1
Senegal	3–4	Gabon	1–2	2–2
Tunisia	7–1	Libya	5–0	2–1
Cameroon	4–0	Tanzania	4–0	0–0
Algeria	0–5	Ivory Coast	0–3	0–2
Nigeria	6–0	Somalia	6–0	
Morocco	2–2 (a)	Guinea	1–0	1–2
Egypt	3–1	Uganda	3–1	0–0
Mozambique	4–1	Botswana	3–0	1–1
Ethiopia	0–2	Zambia	0–0	0–2
South Africa	5–0	Madagascar	2–0	3–0
Ghana	w/o	Guinea-Bissau	w/o	w/o
Zimbabwe	w/o	Malawi	w/o	w/o
Mali	w/o	Mauritania	9 - 1	w/o

=== Second round ===
The Second Round first leg matches were played on 28 and 29 September 2002. The second leg matches was played on 20 October 2002. The winners of the aggregate of the two legs qualified for the Finals.

Team 1	Agg.	Team 2	1st leg	2nd leg
Togo	2–3	Gabon	1–0	1–3
Ghana	1–1(5-4)(PSO)	Tunisia	1–0	0–1
Cameroon	2–3	Ivory Coast	0–1	2–2
Nigeria	2–3	Morocco	1–2	1–1
Mali	2–0	Mozambique	1–0	1–0
Egypt	2–0	Zimbabwe	2–0	0–0
Zambia	4–4 (a)	South Africa	4–1	0–3

== Teams ==
The final tournament, consisting of 8 teams, were held from 18 March to 1 April 2003.

- Egypt
- Morocco
- Ivory Coast
- Ghana
- Gabon
- Burkina Faso (hosts)
- Mali
- South Africa

== Referees ==
Referees: (Burkina Faso) Pare Lassina; (Egypt) Essam Abdel Fattah; (Tunisia) Atef Yacoubi; (Senegal) Samba Diouf; (The Gambia) Modou Sowe; (Guinea) Keita Yakhouba; (South Africa) Mochubela Walters; (Cameroon) Njike Gilbert	Assistant referees: (Rwanda) Celestin Ntangungira; (Burkina Faso) Millogo Brama; (Burkina Faso) Nako Boukare; (Mali) Diabate Moussa; (Cameroon) Bekolo Angoula; (Republic of the Congo) Robert Kimbatsa; (Ethiopia) Luleseged Begashew; (Angola) Antonio Luciano

== Group stage ==
=== Group A ===
Pos	Team	Pld	W	D	L	GF	GA	GD	Pts	Qualification
1	Mali	3	1	2	0	7	5	+2	5	Advance to knockout stage
2	Burkina Faso (H)	3	1	2	0	3	2	+1	5	Advance to knockout stage
3	Gabon	3	1	1	1	6	5	+1	4	
4	South Africa	3	0	1	2	3	7	−4	1	

Rules for classification: Group tiebreakers
(H) Hosts
4 January 2003

Burkina Faso	0 - 0	South Africa

Stade du 4-Août, Ouagadougou

4 January 2003

Mali	2 - 2	Gabon

Stade du 4-Août, Ouagadougou

7 January 2003

Mali	4 - 2	South Africa

Stade du 4-Août, Ouagadougou

7 January 2003

Burkina Faso	2 - 1	Gabon

Stade du 4-Août, Ouagadougou

10 January 2003

Gabon	3 - 1	South Africa

Stade Municipal, Bobo Dioulasso

10 January 2003

Burkina Faso	1 - 1	Mali

Stade du 4-Août, Ouagadougou

=== Group B ===
Pos	Team	Pld	W	D	L	GF	GA	GD	Pts	Qualification
1	Ivory Coast	3	2	1	0	5	3	+2	7	Advance to knockout stage
2	Egypt	3	1	2	0	6	2	+4	5	Advance to knockout stage
3	Ghana	3	0	2	1	3	4	−1	2	
4	Morocco	3	0	1	2	0	5	−5	1	

Rules for classification: Group tiebreakers
5 January 2003

Ghana	0 - 0	Morocco

Stade Municipal, Bobo Dioulasso

5 January 2003

Ivory Coast	1 - 1	Egypt

Stade Municipal, Bobo Dioulasso

8 January 2003

Ivory Coast	1 - 0	Morocco

Stade Municipal, Bobo Dioulasso

8 January 2003

Ghana	1 - 1	Egypt

Stade Municipal, Bobo Dioulasso

11 January 2003

Ivory Coast	3 - 2	Ghana

Stade Municipal, Bobo Dioulasso

11 January 2003

Morocco	0 - 4	Egypt

Stade du 4-Août, Ouagadougou

== Knockout stage ==
Semifinals
A1	Mali	0
B2	Egypt	1
B1	Ivory Coast(PSO)	0(3)
A2	Burkina Faso	0(1)

Final
Egypt	4
Ivory Coast	3
Third place
Mali(PSO)	1(5)
Burkina Faso	1(4)

=== Semifinals ===
14 January 2003

Mali	0- 1	Egypt

Stade du 4-Août, Ouagadougou

14 January 2003

Ivory Coast	0 - 0(3-1)(PSO)	Burkina Faso

Stade du 4-Août, Ouagadougou

=== Third place ===
17 January 2003

Mali	1 - 1(5-4)(PSO)	Burkina Faso

Stade du 4-Août, Ouagadougou

=== Final ===
18 January 2003

Egypt	4 - 3 (a.e.t.)	Ivory Coast
Emad Moteab 2', 94'; Ahmed Fathy 26' (pen.); Hosny Abd Rabo 33'		Romaric 8'; Yaya Touré 21'; André Saki 44'

Stade du 4-Août, Ouagadougou

2003 African Youth Championship winner

Egypt
Third title

== Qualification to World Youth Championship ==
The four best performing teams qualified for the 2003 FIFA World Youth Championship.

- Burkina Faso
- Ivory Coast
- Egypt
- Mali
