= Lassana Traoré =

Lassana Traoré is a name. People with that name include:

- Lassana Traoré (footballer), Senegalese footballer
- Lassana Traoré (politician), Malian politician
