= Ricciulli =

Ricciulli is an Italian surname. Notable people with the surname include:

- Antonio Ricciulli (1582–1643), Italian Catholic archbishop
- Girolamo Ricciulli (1580–1626), Italian Catholic bishop
- João Ricciulli (born 1999), Bissau-Guinean footballer
