= 1983 African Youth Championship =

4th African youth football qualification tournament

Tournament details
- Dates: 25 July 1982 – 16 April 1983
- Teams: 18 (from 1 confederation)

Final positions
- Champions: Nigeria (1st title)
- Runners-up: Ivory Coast

Tournament statistics
- Matches played: 45
- Goals scored: 66 (1.47 per match)

The 1983 African Youth Championship was the 4th edition of the biennial African qualification tournament for the FIFA World Youth Championship which was contested on a home and away two-legged basis.

By reaching the final of this edition of the competition, Nigeria and Ivory Coast qualified for the 1983 FIFA World Youth Championship in Mexico, although the former defeated the latter 4–3 on aggregate to claim their inaugural title.

== Teams ==
The following teams entered this edition of the tournament and played at least a match:

- Algeria
- Angola
- Cameroon
- Ivory Coast
- Equatorial Guinea
- Egypt
- Gabon
- Gambia
- Guinea
- Liberia
- Morocco
- Nigeria
- Senegal
- Sudan
- Swaziland
- Togo
- Tunisia
- Zimbabwe

== Preliminary round ==
Team 1	Agg.	Team 2	1st leg	2nd leg
Liberia	4–3 ^{1}	Guinea	2–2	2–1
Senegal	0–4 ^{2}	Gambia	0–2	0–2 ^{2}
Sudan	w/o ^{3}	Ethiopia		
Togo	w/o ^{3}	Ghana		
Gabon	w/o ^{3}	Central African Republic		
Swaziland	w/o ^{3}	Mauritius		
Congo	w/o ^{3}	Angola		
Upper Volta	w/o ^{3}	Ivory Coast		
Libya	w/o ^{3}	Morocco		

- ^{1} Liberia were ejected from the competition for using ineligible players in both legs.
- ^{2} Senegal withdrew after the first leg.
- ^{3} Ethiopia, Ghana, Central African Republic, Mauritius, Congo, Upper Volta and Libya all withdrew.

== First round ==
Team 1	Agg.	Team 2	1st leg	2nd leg
Sudan	2–4	Egypt	1–1	1–3
Guinea	3–2	Togo	2–1	1–1
Gabon	0–3	Nigeria	0–1	0–2
Swaziland	1–7 ^{1}	Zimbabwe	1–5	0–2 ^{1}
Angola	1–3	Cameroon	0–1	1–2
Ivory Coast	w/o ^{2}	Equatorial Guinea	4-1	n/p
Gambia	1–2	Algeria	0–0	1–2
Morocco	4–0	Tunisia	4–0	0–0

- ^{1} Swaziland withdrew after the first leg.
- ^{2} The second leg was scratched and Ivory Coast advanced to the second round after Equatorial Guinea were ejected from the competition for using five ineligible players in the first leg.

== Quarter-finals ==
Team 1	Agg.	Team 2	1st leg	2nd leg
Egypt	1–1; 7–8 (pen.)	Guinea	1–0	0–1
Nigeria	3–2	Zimbabwe	3–1	0–1
Cameroon	2–5	Ivory Coast	0–2	2–3
Algeria	3–3 (a)	Morocco	2–0	1–3

== Semi-finals ==
Team 1	Agg.	Team 2	1st leg	2nd leg
Guinea	2–3	Nigeria	2–1	0–2
Ivory Coast	2–2 (a)	Algeria	1–0	1–2

== Final ==
Team 1	Agg.	Team 2	1st leg	2nd leg
Ivory Coast	3–4	Nigeria	2–2	1–2

1983 African Youth Championship

Nigeria
First/Inaugural title

== Qualification for the World Youth Championship ==
These two best performing teams qualified for the 1983 FIFA World Youth Championship in Mexico.

- Ivory Coast
- Nigeria
