= Grant Margeman =

South African soccer player

Personal information
- Date of birth: 3 June 1998 (age 28)
- Place of birth: Bonteheuwel, Cape Town
- Height: 1.67 m (5 ft 6 in)
- Position: Midfielder

Team information
- Current team: SuperSport United
- Number: 23

Youth career
- –2016: Ajax Cape Town

Senior career*
Years	Team	Apps	(Gls)
2016–2020	Ajax Cape Town	91	(10)
2020–2023	Mamelodi Sundowns	3	(0)
2021–2022	→ Moroka Swallows (loan)	27	(1)
2022–2023	→ SuperSport United (loan)	26	(2)
2023–	SuperSport United	28	(1)

International career^{‡}
	South Africa U20	8	(2)
2019	South Africa	2	(1)
- * Club domestic league appearances and goals as of 1 August 2024 ‡ National team caps and goals as of 11 June 2023

Grant Margeman (born 3 June 1998) is a South African professional soccer player who plays as a central midfielder for SuperSport United in the Premier Soccer League.

== Club career ==
Born in Cape Town, Grant Margeman made his senior professional debut in the 2016/2017 season at the age of 18 years under Head Coach Stanley Menzo.

== International career ==
Grant Margeman competed at the 2017 Africa U-20 Cup of Nations held in Zambia and helped his national team qualify for the 2017 FIFA U-20 World Cup.

Later that Summer in 2017, Grant Margeman made his debut at the 2017 FIFA U-20 World Cup against Japan. Grant Margeman scored his first goal in the World Cup and it would end being the only goal scored for South Africa in the entire tournament. During the 2017 FIFA U20 World Cup competition, back home in Cape Town, Grant Margeman was awarded the 2017 Rookie of the Year Award by his respective club Ajax Cape Town.

== Career statistics ==
=== International goals ===
Scores and results list South Africa's goal tally first.

No.	Date	Venue	Opponent	Score	Result	Competition
1.	2 June 2019	Princess Magogo Stadium, KwaMashu, South Africa	Botswana	2–0	2–2 (4–5 p)	2019 COSAFA Cup
