= Football at the Jeux de la Francophonie =

- Founded: 1989
- Current champions: Cameroon

The football tournament in the Jeux de la Francophonie occurs every four years. It is contested by French-speaking nations and usually involves the use of youth national teams. Morocco, Canada and Congo are the only nations to have won the tournament twice.

== Statistics ==
Year	Host	Final			Third place match		
Year	Host	Winner	Score	Runner-up	Third place	Score	Fourth place
1989; Details	Morocco	Canada	4–1	Morocco	Congo	3–2	France
1994; Details	France	France	3–2	Egypt	Congo	2–1	Morocco
1997; Details	Madagascar	Canada	0–0 (3–2 p)	Congo	Cameroon	2–1	Madagascar
2001; Details	Canada	Morocco	1–0	France	Egypt	3–0	Cameroon
2005; Details	Niger	Ivory Coast	3–0	Senegal	Burkina Faso	0–0 (5–4 p)	Cameroon
2009; Details	Lebanon	Congo	0–0 (5–3 p)	Ivory Coast	Morocco	3–1	Canada
2013; Details	France	Congo	2–1	Morocco	Senegal	0–0 (11–10 p)	Ivory Coast
2017; Details	Ivory Coast	Morocco	1–1 (6–5 p)	Ivory Coast	Mali	2–1	DR Congo
2023; Details	DR Congo	Cameroon	2–1	Burkina Faso	Niger	1–1 (4–3 p)	Benin

=== Performances by Countries ===
Team	Champions	Runners-up	Third-place	Fourth-place
Morocco	2 (2001, 2017)	2 (1989, 2013)	1 (2009)	1 (1994)
Congo	2 (2009, 2013)	1 (1997)	2 (1989, 1994)	-
Canada	2 (1989, 1997)	-	-	1 (2009)
Ivory Coast	1 (2005)	2 (2009, 2017)	-	1 (2013)
France	1 (1994)	1 (2001)	-	1 (1989)
Cameroon	1 (2023)	-	1 (1997)	2 (2001, 2005)
Egypt	-	1 (1994)	1 (2001)	-
Senegal	-	1 (2005)	1 (2013)	-
Burkina Faso	-	1 (2023)	1 (2005)	-
Mali	-	-	1 (2017)	-
Niger	-	-	1 (2023)	-
Madagascar	-	-	-	1 (1997)
DR Congo	-	-	-	1 (2017)
Benin	-	-	-	1 (2023)
