= Ishaku Konda =

Ghanaian footballer

Personal information
- Full name: Ishaku Konda
- Date of birth: September 11, 1999 (age 27)
- Place of birth: Ghana
- Position: Defender

Team information
- Current team: Jablonec

Senior career*
| Years | Team | Apps | (Gls) |
| 2016–2019 | Legon Cities | 54 | (0) |
| 2019–2020 | Juniors OÖ | 17 | (0) |
| 2020–2022 | Asokwa Deportivo | 0 | (0) |
| 2021 | → Paide (loan) | 21 | (0) |
| 2022 | → České Budějovice (loan) | 4 | (0) |
| 2022– | Jablonec | 1 | (0) |
- * Club domestic league appearances and goals as of 25 May 2023

Ishaku Konda (born September 11, 1999) is a Ghanaian professional footballer who plays as a defender for Jablonec in Fortuna Liga.

== Club career ==
=== Wa All Stars ===
Konda started his career with the Wa All Stars. He played 14 Premier League games for the club in the 2016 season which helped the club win the league and were crowned Ghana Premier league Champions.

=== Juniors OÖ ===
In January 2019, he moved to the Austrian Bundesliga club LASK and signed a one-year contract until December 2019. He was however immediately sent out to their farm team second-tier side FC Juniors OÖ play. After the end of his contract, he left LASK.

He then returned to Ghana and moved to Kumasi-based Division 1 side Asokwa Deportivo FC.

=== Paide ===
On 10 March 2021, Paide Linnameeskond announced via their club's website that they had signed Konda and they he would start training with the first team on 11 March 2021, after the end of his mandatory isolation period due to the COVID-19 pandemic. The signing made him the 3rd Ghanaian to join the Estonian giants after Abdul Razak Yussif and Deabeas Owusu-Sekyere.

== International career ==
Konda has capped for Ghana at the U-20 level for the Ghana national under-20 football team. He served as captain of the side in 2019. During both the qualification of the 2019 Africa U-20 Cup of Nations qualifiers and the 2019 Africa U-20 Cup of Nations.

== Honours ==
Wa All Stars

- Ghana Premier League: 2016
- Ghana Super Cup: 2017
