= Bilal Akoro =

Togolese footballer

Personal information
- Date of birth: 14 December 1999 (age 26)
- Place of birth: Tchamba, Togo
- Position: Winger

Team information
- Current team: AS Douanes

Senior career*
Years	Team	Apps	(Gls)
2016–	AS Douanes		

International career^{‡}
- Togo U17
- Togo U20
2017–	Togo	9	(2)
- * Club domestic league appearances and goals as of 22:37, 1 September 2021 (UTC) ‡ National team caps and goals as of 19:20, 17 November 2022 (UTC)

Bilal Akoro (born 14 December 1999) is a Togolese footballer who plays as a winger for AS Douanes and the Togo national team.

== International career ==
Akoro represented Togo at the under-17 and under-20 levels.

Akoro made his debut with the senior national team in a 0–0 2020 African Nations Championship qualification tie with Benin on 28 July 2017.

== Career statistics ==
=== International ===
As of match played 17 November 2024

Appearances and goals by national team and year
National team	Year	Apps	Goals
Togo	2017	2	0
Togo	2018	1	0
Togo	2019	1	0
Togo	2021	2	1
Togo	2022	1	1
Togo	2024	2	0
Total		9	2
