= Gabon national under-20 football team =

National under-20 association football team representing Gabon

Gabon U-20
- Nickname(s): Les Panthères (The Panthers)
- Association: Gabonese Football Federation (Fédération Gabonaise de Football, FEGAFOOT)
- Confederation: CAF (Africa)
- FIFA code: GAB
First colours	Second colours

African Youth Championship
- Appearances: 5 (first in 1981)

FIFA U-20 World Cup
- Appearances: 0

The Gabon national U-20 football team is the youth football team of the Gabon national football team. It participated in the 2013 African U-20 Championship in Algeria in 2013.

== Competition records ==
=== Africa U-20 Cup of Nations record ===
Africa U-20 Cup of Nations
Year	Result	GP	W	D	L	GS	GA
1979	did not enter						
1981	Preliminary round	2	1	0	1	3	4
1983	First round	2	0	0	2	0	3
1985	did not enter						
1987	did not enter						
1989	Quarter-finals	4	2	0	2	4	5
(Egypt) 1991	Disqualified						
(Mauritius) 1993	did not enter						
(Nigeria) 1995	did not enter						
(Morocco) 1997	did not enter						
(Ghana) 1999	did not qualify						
(Ethiopia) 2001	did not qualify						
(Burkina Faso) 2003	Group stage	3	1	1	1	6	5
(Benin) 2005	Withdrew						
(Republic of the Congo) 2007	did not qualify						
(Democratic Republic of the Congo) 2009	did not qualify						
(South Africa) 2011	did not qualify						
(Algeria) 2013	Group stage	3	1	1	1	2	1
(Senegal) 2015	did not qualify						
(Zambia) 2017	did not qualify						
(Niger) 2019	did not qualify						
(Mauritania) 2021	did not enter						
(Egypt) 2023	did not enter						
Total	5/23	14	5	2	7	15	18
