= Amadou Sagna =

Senegalese footballer

Personal information
- Full name: Amadou Sagna
- Date of birth: 10 June 1999 (age 27)
- Place of birth: Dakar, Senegal
- Height: 1.74 m (5 ft 9 in)
- Position: Forward

Team information
- Current team: Ironi Kiryat Shmona

Youth career
- Cayor Foot
- 2019–2020: Club Brugge

Senior career*
Years	Team	Apps	(Gls)
2020–2022	Club Brugge	0	(0)
2020	→ Oostende (loan)	0	(0)
2020–2021	Club NXT	15	(0)
2021–2022	→ Stade Briochin (loan)	23	(3)
2021–2022	→ Stade Briochin II (loan)	1	(2)
2022–2023	Niort	37	(4)
2023–2026	Guingamp	85	(9)
2026–	Ironi Kiryat Shmona	0	(0)

International career^{‡}
2019	Senegal U20	8	(4)
- * Club domestic league appearances and goals as of 11 May 2026 ‡ National team caps and goals as of 8 June 2019

Amadou Sagna (born 10 June 1999) is a Senegalese professional footballer who plays as a forward for Israeli Premier League club Ironi Kiryat Shmona.

== Club career ==
On 9 July 2019, Sagna signed with Belgian First Division A side Club Brugge. On 3 January 2020, Sagna signed with Oostende on loan for the rest of the 2019–20 season.

On 22 August 2020, Sagna made his professional debut for Club NXT, Brugge's reserve side in the Belgian First Division B. He started and played 85 minutes against RWDM47 as NXT were defeated 0–2.

On 26 May 2022, Club Brugge announced that Sagna had signed a permanent contract with Ligue 2 side Niort.

On 6 July 2023, Sagna signed a three-year contract with Guingamp.

== International career ==
On 13 May 2019, it was announced that Sagna would be part of the final Senegal squad for the 2019 FIFA U-20 World Cup. In the opening match against Tahiti, he scored after 9.6 seconds, the fastest ever goal in the competition's history. He ended the tournament with four goals, tied for second in the tournament, and won the Bronze Boot.

== Career statistics ==
=== Club ===
As of match played 16 October 2020

Appearances and goals by club, season and competition
Club	Season	League			Cup		Continental		Total	
Club	Season	Division	Apps	Goals	Apps	Goals	Apps	Goals	Apps	Goals
Club NXT	2020–21	Belgian First Division B	6	0	—	—	—	—	6	0
Career total			6	0	0	0	0	0	6	0

== Honours ==
International

- Africa U-20 Cup of Nations runner-up: 2019

Individual

- FIFA U-20 World Cup Bronze Boot: 2019
