= Burkina Faso national under-20 football team =

National under-20 association football team representing Burkina Faso

Burkina Faso U-20
- Association: Burkinabé Football Federation
- Confederation: CAF (Africa)
- FIFA code: BFA
First colours	Second colours

U-20 Africa Cup of Nations
- Appearances: 4 (first in 2003)
- Best result: Fourth place (2003)

FIFA U-20 World Cup
- Appearances: 1 (first in 2003)
- Best result: Round of 16 (2003)

The Burkina Faso national under-20 football team is the under-20 youth team for national football in Burkina Faso. The team is controlled by the Burkinabé Football Federation.

The team participated at the 2003 FIFA World Youth Championship held in the United Arab Emirates. They did very well in the group stage and finished first. In the round of 16 they were eliminated by Canada 1–0. That tournament was their first ever U-20 World Cup.

The team won the gold medal in the men's tournament at the 2019 African Games held in Morocco. This was the first time the team won gold at the African Games. Djibril Ouattara was among the top scorers in the tournament.

== Competitive record ==
=== FIFA U-20 World Cup record ===
FIFA U-20 World Cup record
Year	Round	Pld	W	D*	L	GF	GA
(Tunisia) 1977	Did not enter						
(Japan) 1979	Did not enter						
(Australia) 1981	Did not enter						
(Mexico) 1983	Did not enter						
(Soviet Union) 1985	Withdrew before qualification						
(Chile) 1987	Did not enter						
(Saudi Arabia) 1989	Did not enter						
(Portugal) 1991	Withdrew before qualification						
(Australia) 1993	Did not enter						
(Qatar) 1995	Did not qualify						
(Malaysia) 1997	Did not qualify						
(Nigeria) 1999	Withdrew before qualification						
(Argentina) 2001	Did not qualify						
(United Arab Emirates) 2003	Round of 16	4	1	2	1	2	1
(Netherlands) 2005	Did not qualify						
(Canada) 2007	Did not qualify						
(Egypt) 2009	Did not qualify						
(Colombia) 2011	Did not qualify						
(Turkey) 2013	Did not qualify						
(New Zealand) 2015	Did not qualify						
(South Korea) 2017	Did not qualify						
(Poland) 2019	Did not qualify						
(Argentina) 2023	Did not qualify						
(Chile) 2025	Did not qualify						
(Azerbaijan) (Uzbekistan) 2027	To be determined						
(Armenia) (Georgia (country)) 2029	To be determined						
Total	1/26	4	1	2	1	2	1

=== U-20 Africa Cup of Nations record ===
U-20 Africa Cup of Nations
Year	Round	Position	GP	W	D*	L	GS	GA
1979	Did not enter							
1981	Did not enter							
1983	Did not enter							
1985	Withdrew before qualification							
1987	Did not enter							
1989	Did not enter							
(Egypt) 1991	Withdrew before qualification							
(Mauritius) 1993	Did not enter							
(Nigeria) 1995	Did not qualify							
(Morocco) 1997	Did not qualify							
(Ghana) 1999	Withdrew before qualification							
(Ethiopia) 2001	Did not qualify							
(Burkina Faso) 2003	Fourth place	4th	5	1	4	0	4	3
(Benin) 2005	Did not qualify							
(Republic of the Congo) 2007	Group Stage	7th	3	1	0	2	2	3
(Rwanda) 2009	Did not qualify							
(South Africa) 2011	Did not qualify							
(Algeria) 2013	Did not qualify							
(Senegal) 2015	Did not qualify							
(Zambia) 2017	Did not qualify							
(Niger) 2019	Group Stage	8th	3	0	0	3	1	8
(Mauritania) 2021	Quarter-finals	7th	4	2	2	0	4	1
(Egypt) 2023	Did not qualify							
(Egypt) 2025	Did not qualify							
(Ghana) 2027	TBD							
Total	Fourth place	5/26	15	4	6	5	11	15

*Draws include knockout matches decided on penalty kicks.

*There was no third place match from 1979-1989.

== Current squad ==
The following players were selected for the 2021 Africa U-20 Cup of Nations.

No.	Pos.	Player	Date of birth (age)	Club
1	GK	Sidi Diawara	18 March 2001 (aged 19)	(Burkinabé Football Federation) AS Douanes
2	DF	Gaoussou Sanou	24 June 2001 (aged 19)	(Burkinabé Football Federation) Royal
3	DF	Eric Chardey	6 August 2003 (aged 17)	(Burkinabé Football Federation) Majestic
4	DF	Yashir Moustapha Ouedraogo	31 December 2001 (aged 19)	(Burkinabé Football Federation) ASFA
5	DF	Yacouba Nasser Djiga	15 November 2002 (aged 18)	(Swiss Football Association) FC Basel
6	MF	Roland Sanou	10 May 2002 (aged 18)	(Burkinabé Football Federation) Royal
7	FW	Kouamé Botué	7 August 2002 (aged 18)	(Burkinabé Football Federation) USFA
8	MF	Yael Tiendrebeogo	25 April 2001 (aged 19)	(Romanian Football Federation) Gaz Metan Târgu Mureș
9	FW	Alassane Zeba	24 July 2003 (aged 17)	(Burkinabé Football Federation) Academie Football Tenakourou
10	MF	Irahim Bance	15 January 2001 (aged 20)	(Ivorian Football Federation) ASEC Mimosas
11	FW	Pierre Landry Kabore	5 July 2001 (aged 19)	(Burkinabé Football Federation) Salitas
12	MF	Faad Sana	15 April 2003 (aged 17)	(Ghana Football Association) WAFA
13	FW	Nathanio Jr. Kompaore	20 June 2001 (aged 19)	(Royal Belgian Football Association) Anderlecht
14	MF	Clovis Ouedraogo	24 July 2002 (aged 18)	(Burkinabé Football Federation) ÉF Ouagadougou
15	MF	Drissa Banao	17 September 2001 (aged 19)	(Burkinabé Football Federation) KOZAF
16	GK	Ladji Sanou	21 April 2003 (aged 17)	(Burkinabé Football Federation) Salitas
17	MF	Blakiss Ouattara	16 December 2001 (aged 19)	(Burkinabé Football Federation) RC Bobo Dioulasso
18	MF	Ousmane Diane	14 February 2001 (aged 20)	(Burkinabé Football Federation) ASFA
19	FW	Urbain Convolbo	2 November 2002 (aged 18)	(Burkinabé Football Federation) AS Douanes
20	MF	Raouf Memel Dao	5 September 2003 (aged 17)	(Burkinabé Football Federation) US Ouagadougou
21	FW	Joffrey Bazie	27 October 2003 (aged 17)	(Burkinabé Football Federation) Salitas
22	DF	Karamoko Bamba	2 December 2003 (aged 17)	(Burkinabé Football Federation) RC Bobo Dioulasso
23	GK	Sebastien Koula Tou	1 December 2004 (aged 16)	(French Football Federation) Football Broug
24	MF	Aboubacar Belem	24 January 2002 (aged 19)	(Burkinabé Football Federation) Majestic
25	DF	Mohamed Congo	8 October 2003 (aged 17)	(Burkinabé Football Federation) Majestic
26	MF	Noufou Zagre	9 March 2004 (aged 16)	(Burkinabé Football Federation) ASF Bobo Dioulasso
27	FW	Moubarack Compaore	24 September 2002 (aged 18)	(Senegalese Football Federation) Oslo Football Académie de Dakar
28	FW	Daouda Beleme	5 January 2001 (aged 20)	(German Football Association) St. Pauli
29	DF	Gilbert Bilgo	2 May 2001 (aged 19)	(Burkinabé Football Federation) US Ouagadougou
30	GK	Moussa Traore	2 January 2001 (aged 20)	(Burkinabé Football Federation) Rahimo
31	DF	Brahima Dao	12 April 2003 (aged 17)	(Burkinabé Football Federation) Rahimo
