= Alain Miyogho =

Gabonese footballer

Personal information
- Full name: Alain Rodrick Miyogho
- Date of birth: 24 October 2000 (age 26)
- Position: Midfielder

Team information
- Current team: Mangasport

Senior career*
Years	Team	Apps	(Gls)
2016–	Mangasport		

International career^{‡}
2018–	Gabon	1	(0)
- * Club domestic league appearances and goals as of 12:41, 11 October 2018 (UTC) ‡ National team caps and goals as of 12:41, 11 October 2018 (UTC)

Alain Rodrick Miyogho (born 24 October 2000) is a Gabonese international footballer who plays for Mangasport, as a midfielder.

== Career ==
He has played club football for Mangasport.

He made his international debut for Gabon in 2018.
