= Lassana Traoré (footballer) =

Senegalese footballer (born 2007)

Personal information
- Date of birth: 7 June 2007 (age 19)
- Place of birth: Koumpentoum, Senegal
- Height: 1.80 m (5 ft 11 in)
- Position: Left-back

Team information
- Current team: Saint-Étienne
- Number: 34

Youth career
- Diambars

Senior career*
Years	Team	Apps	(Gls)
–2025	Diambars		
2025–	Saint-Étienne	1	(0)
2025–	Saint-Étienne B	2	(0)

International career^{‡}
2023	Senegal U17	6	(0)
2025–	Senegal U20	3	(0)
- * Club domestic league appearances and goals as of 2 December 2025 ‡ National team caps and goals as of 01:54, 10 August 2025 (UTC)

Lassana Traoré (born 6 May 2007) is a Senegalese professional footballer who plays as a left-back for Ligue 2 club Saint-Étienne.

== Club career ==
Traoré joined the youth academy of Diambars at the age of eleven. On 18 June 2025, he joined French Ligue 2 club Saint-Étienne, signing a four-year professional contract. He initially integrated the first team as the back-up left-back.

== International career ==
As part of the Senegal under-17 national team in 2023, Traoré won the 2023 U-17 Africa Cup of Nations.

== Honours ==
Senegal U17

- U-17 Africa Cup of Nations: 2023
