= Abdou El Id =

Mauritanian footballer

Personal information
- Full name: Abdou M'Bark El Id
- Date of birth: 16 June 1999 (age 27)
- Place of birth: Riyad, Nouakchott, Mauritania
- Height: 1.85 m (6 ft 1 in)
- Position: Midfielder

Team information
- Current team: Alittihad Misurata
- Number: 8

Senior career*
Years	Team	Apps	(Gls)
2017–2019	ASAC Concorde		
2019–2020	Numancia B	2	(0)
2020–2022	FC Nouadhibou		
2022–2024	Kukësi	36	(1)
2024–	Alittihad Misurata		

International career
- Mauritania U20
2018	Mauritania	1	(0)
- * Club domestic league appearances and goals as of 25 March 2024

Abdou M'Bark El Id (born 16 June 1999), is a Mauritanian international footballer who plays for FK Kukësi.

== Club career ==
In 2019, El Id signed for Spanish side CD Numancia, immediately being assigned to the club's 'B' team. Following a move back to his native Mauritania with Nouadhibou, he returned to Europe to join Albanian side FK Kukësi in 2022.

In September 2024, El Id signed for Libyan Premier League club Alittihad Misurata.

== Career statistics ==
=== Club ===
As of matches played 25 October 2022

Appearances and goals by club, season and competition
Club	Season	League			Cup		Other		Total	
Club	Season	Division	Apps	Goals	Apps	Goals	Apps	Goals	Apps	Goals
CD Numancia B	2019–20	Tercera División	2	0	–		0	0	2	0
FK Kukësi	2022–23	Kategoria Superiore	3	0	1 (Note: Appearances in the Albanian Cup)	0	0	0	4	0
Career total			5	0	1	0	0	0	6	0

=== International ===
As of matches played 16 June 2019.

National team	Year	Apps	Goals
Mauritania
Mauritania	2018	1	0
Total		1	0
