= Wiseman Meyiwa =

South African footballer

Personal information
- Full name: Wiseman Meyiwa
- Date of birth: 27 December 1999 (age 26)
- Place of birth: Pietermaritzburg, South Africa
- Height: 1.73 m (5 ft 8 in)
- Position: Midfielder

Youth career
- Tastic
- 2014–2017: Kaizer Chiefs

Senior career*
| Years | Team | Apps | (Gls) |
| 2017–2019 | Kaizer Chiefs | 14 | (1) |

International career^{‡}
| 2015 | South Africa U17 | 2 | (0) |
| 2017 | South Africa U20 | 2 | (0) |
| 2017 | South Africa | 1 | (0) |
- * Club domestic league appearances and goals as of 14:11, 31 January 2019 (UTC) ‡ National team caps and goals as of 14:11, 31 January 2019 (UTC)

Wiseman Meyiwa (born 27 December 1999) is a South African retired footballer. During his playing career, he represented South African Premier Division club Kaizer Chiefs and the South African national team. He was forced to retire at the age of 19 after being rendered a paraplegic following a motor vehicle accident in 2018.

== Club career ==
=== Kaizer Chiefs ===
Meyiwa is a product of the Kaizer Chiefs academy, having joined the club in 2014. During the 2017–18 campaign, he was promoted to the first team by manager Steve Komphela and scored on debut against Cape Town City in September 2017, aged 17. Upon doing so, he broke a long-standing record held by Marks Maponyane to become the youngest player to both represent and score for the club in a professional match. Following his debut, speculation arose that Meyiwa had lied about his age but this was denied by club chairman Kaizer Motaung and nothing further came from the allegations.

In November 2018, he was involved in a motor vehicle accident on the N3 Highway in the Free State Province of South Africa and had to be transported to the intensive care unit via ambulance. On 31 January 2019, Kaizer Chiefs released a statement that Meyiwa had been forced to retire as a result of the injuries he sustained in the accident; injuries which included an unstable fracture of his thoracic vertebrae and which resulted in permanent paraplegia. He made 21 appearances for the club in total across all competitions.

== International career ==
=== South Africa ===
Meyiwa is a former South African youth international and represented his nation at the 2015 FIFA U-17 World Cup and the 2017 FIFA U-20 World Cup. He made a single appearance for the South African national team on 12 August 2017 in a 2018 African Nations Championship qualification match against Zambia.

== Career statistics ==
=== International ===
As of matches played 8 January 2018.

| National team | Year | Apps | Goals |
|---|---|---|---|
| South Africa | 2017 | 1 | 0 |
| Total | | 1 | 0 |
