= 2017 U-20 Africa Cup of Nations =

2017 Africa U-20 Cup of Nations

Tournament details
- Host country: Zambia
- Dates: 26 February – 12 March
- Teams: 8 (from 1 confederation)
- Venue: 2 (in 2 host cities)

Final positions
- Champions: Zambia (1st title)
- Runners-up: Senegal
- Third place: Guinea
- Fourth place: South Africa

Tournament statistics
- Matches played: 16
- Goals scored: 50 (3.13 per match)
- Top scorer(s): (South Africa) Luther Singh (Zambia) Edward Chilufya (Zambia) Patson Daka (4 goals each)
- Best player: (Zambia) Patson Daka
- Fair play award: South Africa

The 2017 Africa U-20 Cup of Nations, officially known as the Total U-20 Africa Cup Of Nations, Zambia 2017, was the 14th edition of the Africa U-20 Cup of Nations (21st edition if tournaments without hosts are included), the biennial international youth football tournament organized by the Confederation of African Football (CAF) for players aged 20 and below. The tournament was set to take place in Zambia between 26 February – 12 March 2017.

The top four teams qualified for the 2017 FIFA U-20 World Cup in South Korea.

== Qualification ==
The qualifiers were played between 1 April and 24 July 2016. At the end of the qualification phase, seven teams joined the hosts Zambia.

=== Player eligibility ===
Players born 1 January 1997 or later are eligible to participate in the competition.

=== Qualified teams ===
The following eight teams qualified for the final tournament. Defending champions Nigeria failed to qualify. Congo and Ghana also failed to qualify, thus the winners of five of the last six tournaments failed to qualify for this tournament.

Note: All appearance statistics count only those since the introduction of final tournament in 1991.

Team	Appearance	Previous best appearance
Cameroon	9th	Champions (1995)
Egypt	11th	Champions (1991, 2003, 2013)
Guinea	3rd	Group stage (1995, 1999)
Mali	11th	Third place (2003)
Senegal	4th	Runners-up (2015)
South Africa	7th	Runners-up (1997)
Sudan	2nd	Group stage (1997)
Zambia (hosts)	7th	Fourth place (1991, 1999, 2007)

== Venues ==
Lusaka	Location of venues in Zambia	Ndola
National Heroes Stadium	Location of venues in Zambia	Levy Mwanawasa Stadium
Capacity: 60,000	Location of venues in Zambia	Capacity: 50,000

== Match officials ==
A total of 12 referees and 14 assistant referees were selected for the tournament.

Referees

- Hélder Martins de Carvalho (Angola)
- (Burkina Faso) Juste Ephrem Zio (Burkina Faso)
- Thierry Nkurunziza (Burundi)
- Antoine Effa (Cameroon)
- (South Africa) Victor Gomes (South Africa)
- Ibrahim Nour El Din (Egypt)
- Sékou Ahmed Touré (Guinea)
- Sadok Selmi (Tunisia)
- Jackson Pavaza (Namibia)
- Louis Hakizimana (Rwanda)
- Joshua Bondo (Botswana)
- Chewe Wisdom (Zambia)

Assistant referees

- Mokrani Gourari (Algeria)
- Issa Yahya (Chad)
- (Republic of the Congo) Steven Danilek M. Moyo (Congo)
- (The Gambia) Sosseh Sulayman (Gambia)
- Sidiki Sidibe (Guinea)
- Cheruiyot Gilbert (Kenya)
- Mark Ssonko (Uganda)
- Warr Adbelrahman (Mauritania)
- (Democratic Republic of the Congo) Nabina Blaise Sebutu (DR Congo)
- Toure Sengne Cheikh (Senegal)
- Eldrick Adelaide (Seychelles)
- (South Africa) Khumalo Steven (South Africa)
- Diakite Moriba (Mali)
- Kasengele Romeo (Zambia)

== Draw ==
The draw for the tournament took place on 24 October 2016, 11:00 local time (UTC+2) at the CAF Headquarters in Cairo.

The teams were seeded based on the results of the last edition (final tournament and qualifiers).

Level 1	Level 2	Level 3	Level 4
Zambia (host, assigned to A1); Senegal (2015 runner-up, assigned to B1)	Mali; South Africa	Cameroon; Egypt	Sudan; Guinea

== Squads ==
Each squad can contain a maximum of 21 players.

== Group stage ==
The group winners and runners-up advance to the semi-finals and qualify for the 2017 FIFA U-20 World Cup.

Tiebreakers

The teams are ranked according to points (3 points for a win, 1 point for a draw, 0 points for a loss). If tied on points, tiebreakers are applied in the following order:

1. Number of points obtained in games between the teams concerned;
2. Goal difference in games between the teams concerned;
3. Goals scored in games between the teams concerned;
4. If, after applying criteria 1 to 3 to several teams, two teams still have an equal ranking, criteria 1 to 3 are reapplied exclusively to the matches between the two teams in question to determine their final rankings. If this procedure does not lead to a decision, criteria 5 to 7 apply;
5. Goal difference in all games;
6. Goals scored in all games;
7. Drawing of lots.

All times are local, CAT (UTC+2).

=== Group A ===
Pos	Team	Pld	W	D	L	GF	GA	GD	Pts	Qualification
1	Zambia (H)	3	3	0	0	10	2	+8	9	Knockout stage and 2017 FIFA U-20 World Cup
2	Guinea	3	1	1	1	4	4	0	4	Knockout stage and 2017 FIFA U-20 World Cup
3	Egypt	3	0	2	1	2	4	−2	2	
4	Mali	3	0	1	2	3	9	−6	1	

Source: CAF
Rules for classification: Group stage tiebreakers
(H) Hosts
26 February 2017
15:00

Zambia	1–0	Guinea
Daka 47'	Report

National Heroes Stadium, Lusaka
Referee: Juste Ephrem Zio (Burkina Faso)
26 February 2017
18:00

Egypt	0–0	Mali
	Report

National Heroes Stadium, Lusaka
Referee: Victor Gomes (South Africa)

1 March 2017
15:00

Guinea	1–1	Egypt
Touré 79'	Report	Mostafa Mohamed 37'

National Heroes Stadium, Lusaka
Referee: Jackson Pavaza (Namibia)
1 March 2017
18:00

Mali	1–6	Zambia
Danté 5'	Report	F. Sakala 7', 65'; E. Banda 24'; Mwepu 37'; Chilufya 49', 53'

National Heroes Stadium, Lusaka
Referee: Joshua Bondo (Botswana)

4 March 2017
15:00

Zambia	3–1	Egypt
Daka 48', 90'; F. Sakala 72'	Report	Nedved 35'

National Heroes Stadium, Lusaka
Referee: Hélder Martins de Carvalho (Angola)
4 March 2017
15:00

Guinea	3–2	Mali
M. Sylla 49' (pen.), 59'; M. Aly Camara 72'	Report	Koïta 2'; M. Diakité 52' (pen.)

Levy Mwanawasa Stadium, Ndola
Referee: Antoine Effa (Cameroon)

=== Group B ===
Pos	Team	Pld	W	D	L	GF	GA	GD	Pts	Qualification
1	Senegal	3	2	1	0	7	4	+3	7	Knockout stage and 2017 FIFA U-20 World Cup
2	South Africa	3	2	0	1	9	6	+3	6	Knockout stage and 2017 FIFA U-20 World Cup
3	Cameroon	3	1	0	2	5	6	−1	3	
4	Sudan	3	0	1	2	3	8	−5	1	

Source: CAF
Rules for classification: Group stage tiebreakers
27 February 2017
15:00

Senegal	1–1	Sudan
Niane 88'	Report	Mutwakil 21' (pen.)

Levy Mwanawasa Stadium, Ndola
Referee: Ibrahim Nour El Din (Egypt)
27 February 2017
18:00

Cameroon	1–3	South Africa
Ayuk 14'	Report	Singh 16', 26' (pen.), 57'

Levy Mwanawasa Stadium, Ndola
Referee: Thierry Nkurunziza (Burundi)

2 March 2017
15:00

Sudan	1–4	Cameroon
Walaa Eldin 79'	Report	Ketu 8'; Ayuk 51'; Gouet 73'; Mbaizo 89'

Levy Mwanawasa Stadium, Ndola
Referee: Wisdom Chewe (Zambia)
2 March 2017
18:00

South Africa	3–4	Senegal
Jordan 1'; Malepe 24'; Singh 81'	Report	Ndiaye 48'; Diagne 53', 60'; Diatta 70'

Levy Mwanawasa Stadium, Ndola
Referee: Louis Hakizimana (Rwanda)

5 March 2017
15:00

Senegal	2–0	Cameroon
Niane 45'; Diatta 47'	Report

Levy Mwanawasa Stadium, Ndola
Referee: Joshua Bondo (Botswana)
5 March 2017
15:00

Sudan	1–3	South Africa
Al-Nasan 24'	Report	Mahlambi 13'; Margeman 60'; Mbatha 66'

National Heroes Stadium, Lusaka
Referee: Sékou Ahmed Touré (Guinea)

== Knockout stage ==
In the knockout stage, if a match is level at the end of normal playing time, extra time will be played (two periods of 15 minutes each) and followed, if necessary, by kicks from the penalty mark to determine the winner, except for the third place match where no extra time will be played.

=== Bracket ===
Semi-finals
8 March – Lusaka
Zambia (a.e.t.)	1
South Africa	0
9 March – Ndola
Senegal	1
Guinea	0

Final
12 March – Lusaka
Zambia	2
Senegal	0
Third place
12 March – Lusaka
South Africa	1
Guinea	2

=== Semi-finals ===
8 March 2017
18:00

Zambia	1–0 (a.e.t.)	South Africa
Chilufya 109'	Report

National Heroes Stadium, Lusaka
Referee: Sadok Selmi (Tunisia)

9 March 2017
18:00

Senegal	1–0	Guinea
Badji 12'	Report

Levy Mwanawasa Stadium, Ndola
Referee: Louis Hakizimana (Rwanda)

=== Third place match ===
12 March 2017
14:00

South Africa	1–2	Guinea
Jordan 5'	Report	Mohamme 6' (o.g.); Bangoura 85' (pen.)

National Heroes Stadium, Lusaka
Referee: Juste Ephrem Zio (Burkina Faso)

=== Final ===
12 March 2017
17:30

Zambia	2–0	Senegal
Daka 16'; Chilufya 34'	Report

National Heroes Stadium, Lusaka
Referee: Thierry Nkurunziza (Burundi)

== Awards ==
=== Winners ===
2017 Africa U-20 Cup of Nations winners

Zambia
First title

=== Individual awards ===
The following awards were given at the conclusion of the tournament.

Total Man of the Competition

- (Zambia) Patson Daka

Top scorer

- (South Africa) Luther Singh (4 goals, 2 assists)

Fair Play Award

- South Africa

=== CAF Best XI ===
- Goalkeeper: Mangani Banda (Zambia)
- Defenders: Ousseynou Diagne (Senegal), Mamadou Mbaye (Senegal), Solomon Sakala (Zambia)
- Midfielders: Krepin Diatta (Senegal), Ibrahima Niane (Senegal), Sylla Morlaye (Guinea), Edward Chilufya (Zambia), Fashion Sakala (Zambia)
- Forwards: Luther Singh (South Africa), Patson Daka (Zambia)
- Substitutes: Lamine Sarr (Senegal), Prosper Chiluya (Zambia), Enock Mwepu (Zambia), Grant Margeman (South Africa), Liam Jordan (South Africa), Yamodou Toure (Guinea), Mohamed Aly Camara (Guinea)

== Goalscorers ==
4 goals

- (South Africa) Luther Singh
- (Zambia) Edward Chilufya
- (Zambia) Patson Daka

3 goals

- (Zambia) Fashion Sakala

2 goals

- (Cameroon) Eric Ayuk
- (Guinea) Morlaye Sylla
- (Senegal) Ousseynou Diagne
- (Senegal) Krépin Diatta
- (Senegal) Ibrahima Niane
- (South Africa) Liam Jordan

1 goal

- (Cameroon) Samuel Gouet
- (Cameroon) Kalvin Ketu
- (Cameroon) Olivier Mbaizo
- (Egypt) Mostafa Abdalla
- (Egypt) Karim Nedved
- (Guinea) Mohamed Aly Camara
- (Guinea) Naby Bangoura
- (Guinea) Yamodou Touré
- (Mali) Abdoul Karim Danté
- (Mali) Moussa Diakité
- (Mali) Sékou Koïta
- (Senegal) Aliou Badji
- (Senegal) Ibrahima Ndiaye
- (South Africa) Phakamani Mahlambi
- (South Africa) Tercious Malepe
- (South Africa) Grant Margeman
- (South Africa) Sibongakonke Mbatha
- (Sudan) Walaa Eldin Yaqoub
- (Sudan) Hassan Mutwakil
- (Sudan) Khaled Al-Nasan
- (Zambia) Emmanuel Banda
- (Zambia) Enock Mwepu

Own goal

- (South Africa) Katlego Mohamme (against Guinea)

== Qualified teams for FIFA U-20 World Cup ==
The following four teams from CAF qualified for the 2017 FIFA U-20 World Cup.

Team	Qualified on	Previous appearances in tournament^{1}
Zambia	1 March 2017	2 (1999, 2007)
Senegal	5 March 2017	1 (2015)
Guinea	4 March 2017	1 (1979)
South Africa	5 March 2017	2 (1997, 2009)

^{1} Bold indicates champion for that year. Italic indicates host for that year.
