= Odo Chabi =

Beninese footballer (born 2000)

Personal information
- Full name: Odo Chabi Bio
- Date of birth: 25 September 2000 (age 26)
- Place of birth: Parakou, Benin
- Position: Striker

Team information
- Current team: Coton

Senior career*
Years	Team	Apps	(Gls)
–2017	Asso de Natitingou		
2018–2019	Soleil		
2020	Tiare Tahiti		
2022–	Coton		

International career
2019	Benin	2	(0)
- * Club domestic league appearances and goals

Odo Chabi Bio (born 25 September 2000) is a Beninese footballer who plays as a striker for Coton.

== Career ==
Chabi began his football development at ALODO SPORTS academy in Toffo, before starting his senior career with Beninese third-tier side Asso de Natitingou. In 2018, he signed for Soleil in the Beninese top flight. Before the second half of 2019–20, Chabi signed for Tahitian club Tiare Tahiti. Before the second half of 2021–22, he signed for Coton in Benin.
