= Driss Khalid =

Association football player (born 1999)

Personal information
- Date of birth: 7 February 1999 (age 27)
- Place of birth: Toulouse, France
- Height: 1.80 m (5 ft 11 in)
- Position: Forward

Team information
- Current team: Colomiers

Youth career
- 2011–2017: Toulouse

Senior career*
Years	Team	Apps	(Gls)
2016–2019	Toulouse B	45	(17)
2017–2019	Toulouse	1	(0)
2019–2021	Amiens	2	(0)
2019–2021	Amiens B	15	(6)
2020–2021	→ Orléans (loan)	13	(1)
2021–2022	Moulins Yzeure	29	(3)
2022–2023	Chambly	15	(4)
2024–	Colomiers	6	(0)

International career
2015	Morocco U17	3	(0)
2015	Morocco U20	4	(3)
- * Club domestic league appearances and goals as of 23 November 2024

Driss Khalid (born 7 February 1999) is a professional footballer who plays as a forward for Championnat National 3 club Colomiers. Born in France, he represented Morocco at youth international level.

== Club career ==
Khalid joined the Toulouse training centre in 2011, and signed his first professional contract with the club in 2017. He made his professional debut for Toulouse in a 2–0 Ligue 1 loss to Marseille on 24 September 2017.

In May 2019 he signed a three-year deal with Amiens. After spending a season with the development squad, he made his debut for Amiens on 22 August 2020, in the 1–0 Ligue 2 victory over Nancy, during which he was sent-off after only a few minutes on the pitch.

On 16 November 2020, Khalid joined Championnat National side Orléans on loan until the end of the 2020–21 season.

== International career ==
Khalid was born in France to Moroccan parents. He represented the Morocco U17s at the 2015 Montaigu Tournament.

At the age of 16, Khalid also represented the Morocco U20s at the L'Alcúdia International Football Tournament in 2015, scoring three goals in his first three games. He also assisted the winner in a 3–2 friendly win over the France U20s in a friendly match on 6 September 2017.
