= 1995 African Youth Championship =

Tournament details
- Host country: Nigeria
- Dates: 28 January – 8 February
- Teams: 8

Final positions
- Champions: Cameroon (1st title)
- Runners-up: Burundi
- Third place: Nigeria
- Fourth place: Mali

The African Youth Championship 1995 was a soccer tournament held in Nigeria. It also served as qualification for the 1995 FIFA World Youth Championship.

== Qualification ==
=== Preliminary round ===
Benin, Botswana, Cape Verde, Congo, Liberia, Mauritania and Swaziland withdrew. As a result, Senegal, Lesotho, Guinea-Bissau, Togo, Burkina Faso, Sierra Leone and Madagascar advanced to the next round.

Team 1	Agg.	Team 2	1st leg	2nd leg
Malawi	1–3	Burundi	1–2	0–1
Angola	6–1	Niger	3–0	3–1

=== First round ===
Kenya, Madagascar, Sierra Leone, Uganda, Zaire and Zimbabwe withdrew. As a result, Cameroon, Mauritius, Morocco, Burundi, Zambia and Ethiopia advanced to the next round.

Team 1	Agg.	Team 2	1st leg	2nd leg
Egypt	3–2	Sudan	2–0	1–2
Togo	1–1(a)	Angola	1–1	0–0
South Africa	4–3	Lesotho	3–2	1–1
Ghana	7–1	Burkina Faso	5–1	2–0
Tunisia	1–1 (p: 4–5)	Mali	1–0	0–1
Ivory Coast	0–1	Senegal	0–1	0–0
Nigeria	5–1	Guinea-Bissau	3–0	2–1
Guinea	3–1	Algeria	2–0	1–1

=== Second round ===
Team 1	Agg.	Team 2	1st leg	2nd leg
Egypt	0–3	Burundi	0–2	0–1
Cameroon	5–4	Angola	4–1	1–3
Mauritius	3–2	South Africa	2–1	1–1
Ethiopia	0–0 (p: 3–4)	Zambia	0–0	0–0
Ghana	0–0 (p: 3–4)	Mali	0–0	0–0
Morocco	0–3	Senegal	0–2	0–1
Nigeria	both through	Guinea	2–0	1–0

Guinea also went through to the main tournament because Nigeria would qualify as host.

== Teams ==
The following teams qualified for the tournament:

- Burundi
- Cameroon
- Guinea
- Mali
- Mauritius
- Nigeria (host)
- Senegal
- Zambia

== Group stage ==
=== Group A ===
Pos	Team	Pld	W	D	L	GF	GA	GD	Pts	Qualification
1	Mali	3	2	1	0	8	4	+4	7	Advance to knockout stage
2	Nigeria (H)	3	2	1	0	6	4	+2	7	Advance to knockout stage
3	Zambia	3	0	1	2	4	6	−2	1	
4	Guinea	3	0	1	2	2	6	−4	1	

Rules for classification: Group tiebreakers
(H) Hosts

28 January	Nigeria	3–3	Mali
	Guinea	2–2	Zambia
30 January	Mali	2–1	Zambia
	Nigeria	1–0	Guinea
1 February	Mali	3–0	Guinea
	Nigeria	2–1	Zambia

=== Group B ===
Pos	Team	Pld	W	D	L	GF	GA	GD	Pts	Qualification
1	Cameroon	3	2	1	0	4	1	+3	7	Advance to knockout stage
2	Burundi	3	1	1	1	3	3	0	4	Advance to knockout stage
3	Mauritius	3	1	0	2	4	6	−2	3	
4	Senegal	3	0	2	1	2	3	−1	2	

Rules for classification: Group tiebreakers

31 January	Cameroon	0–0	Senegal
	Mauritius	1–2	Burundi
2 February	Senegal	1–1	Burundi
	Cameroon	3–1	Mauritius
4 February	Senegal	1–2	Mauritius
	Cameroon	1–0	Burundi

== Semifinals ==
6 February

Cameroon	2 – 1	Nigeria

Kaduna
6 February

Mali	0 – 3	Burundi

Lagos

== Third place match ==
7 February

Nigeria	1 – 0	Mali

Lagos

== Final ==
8 February

Cameroon	4 – 0	Burundi

Lagos

1995 African Youth Championship

Cameroon
First title

== Qualification to World Youth Championship ==
The two best performing teams qualified for the 1995 FIFA World Youth Championship.

- Burundi
- Cameroon
