= Togo national under-20 football team =

National under-20 association football team representing Togo

Togo U-20
- Nickname(s): Les Éperviers (The Sparrow Hawks)
- Association: Togolese Football Federation
- Confederation: CAF (Africa)
- Sub-confederation: WAFU (West Africa)
- Head coach: King Messan Amétokodo
- Home stadium: Stade de Kégué
- FIFA code: TOG
First colours	Second colours

Biggest win
- Togo 4–2 Morocco (Rabat, Morocco; 24 May 2014)

Biggest defeat
- Yugoslavia 4–1 Togo (Santiago, Chile; 18 October 1987)

U-20 Africa Cup of Nations
- Appearances: 3 (first in 1979)
- Best result: Runners-up (1987)

FIFA U-20 World Cup
- Appearances: 1 (first in 1987)
- Best result: Group Stage (1987)

The Togo national under-20 football team, nicknamed the Sparrow Hawks, represents Togo in international youth football competitions. Its primary role is the development of players in preparation for the senior national team. The team competes in a variety of competitions, including the biennial FIFA U-20 World Cup and the U-20 Africa Cup of Nations, which are the top competitions for this age group.

== Competitive record ==
=== FIFA U-20 World Cup record ===
FIFA U-20 World Cup record
Year	Round	GP	W	D^{1}	L	GS	GA	
(Tunisia) 1977	Did not qualify							
(Japan) 1979	Did not qualify							
(Australia) 1981	Did not qualify							
(Mexico) 1983	Did not qualify							
(Soviet Union) 1985	Did not qualify							
(Chile) 1987	Group stage	3	0	0	3	1	9	
(Saudi Arabia) 1989	Did not qualify							
(Portugal) 1991	Did not qualify							
(Australia) 1993	Did not qualify							
(Qatar) 1995	Did not qualify							
(Malaysia) 1997	Did not qualify							
(Nigeria) 1999	Did not qualify							
(Argentina) 2001	Did not qualify							
(United Arab Emirates) 2003	Did not qualify							
(Netherlands) 2005	Did not qualify							
(Canada) 2007	Did not qualify							
(Egypt) 2009	Did not qualify							
(Colombia) 2011	Did not qualify							
(Turkey) 2013	Did not qualify							
(New Zealand) 2015	Did not qualify							
(South Korea) 2017	Did not qualify							
(Poland) 2019	Did not qualify							
(Argentina) 2023	Did not qualify							
(Chile) 2025	Did not qualify							
(Azerbaijan) (Uzbekistan) 2027	Did not qualify							To be determined
(Armenia) (Georgia (country)) 2029								To be determined
Total	1/26	3	0	0	3	1	9	

^{1}Draws include knockout matches decided on penalty kicks.

=== U-20 Africa Cup of Nations record ===
U-20 Africa Cup of Nations
Appearances: 1
Year	Round	Position	GP	W	D	L	GS	GA
1979	Withdrew before qualification							
1981	First round	9th	2	0	0	2	1	5
1983	First round	9th	2	0	1	1	2	3
1985	Withdrew before qualification							
1987	Runners-up	2nd	8	1	3	4	5	10
1989	Withdrew before qualification							
(Egypt) 1991	Withdrew before qualification							
(Mauritius) 1993	Did not qualify							
(Nigeria) 1995	Did not qualify							
(Morocco) 1997	Withdrew before qualification							
(Ghana) 1999	Did not qualify							
(Ethiopia) 2001	did not enter							
(Burkina Faso) 2003	Did not qualify							
(Benin) 2005	did not enter							
(Republic of the Congo) 2007	Did not qualify							
(Democratic Republic of the Congo) 2009	did not enter							
(South Africa) 2011	Did not qualify							
(Algeria) 2013	did not enter							
(Senegal) 2015	did not qualify							
(Zambia) 2017	did not enter							
(Niger) 2019	did not qualify							
(Mauritania) 2021	did not qualify							
(Egypt) 2023	did not qualify							
(Egypt) 2025	did not qualify							
(Ghana) 2027	did not qualify							
Total	Runners-up	3/23	12	1	4	7	8	18
