= U-20 Africa Cup of Nations =

African tournament for the FIFA U-20 World Cup

- Organiser(s): CAF
- Founded: 1979 (qualification); 1991 (tournament)
- Region: Africa
- Teams: 12
- Current champions: South Africa (1st title)
- Most championships: Nigeria (7 titles)
- 2027 U-20 Africa Cup of Nations

The U-20 Africa Cup of Nations, known for short as the U-20 AFCON and for sponsorship purposes as TotalEnergies U-20 Africa Cup of Nations and previously known as the African Youth Championship and the African U-20 Championship, is the biennial African youth football tournament organized by the Confederation of African Football (CAF) for its nations consisting of players under the age of 20. It serves as the African qualification tournament for the FIFA U-20 World Cup.

== History ==
In 1979, FIFA created a world championship for upcoming footballers, causing CAF to install a home-and-away qualification tournament for African nations called the African Youth Championship which also crowned the tournament's champions. In 1991, CAF upgraded the tournament into a full-scale tournament contested by 8 in a chosen host nation.

CAF changed the name of this competition to the African U-20 Championship for the 2011 edition so as to distinguish it from the U-17 competition. On 6 August 2015, the CAF Executive Committee decided to change the tournament's name to the Africa U-20 Cup of Nations in line with the flagship Africa Cup of Nations tournament. However, the name on the official competition logo after 2015 reads as the U-20 Africa Cup of Nations.

On 21 July 2016, French energy and petroleum giant TotalEnergies (formerly Total S.A.) secured an 8-year sponsorship package from CAF to support its competitions.

Since the 2021 edition, the tournament has been contested by 12 teams.

On 28 April 2026, CAF awarded Ghana the hosting rights for the upcoming 2027 edition, thus Ghana will host its second tournament edition and first since 1999 (which they won) in the same year the country will celebrate 70 years of independence.

== Tournament summary ==
=== African Youth Championship (Qualification) ===
Edition	Year	Host nation	Final			Third Place	
Edition	Year	Host nation	Champion	Score	Second Place	Third Place	
2	1979	Home sites	Algeria	2–1	Guinea	Ethiopia	Nigeria
2	1979	Home sites	Algeria	2–3	Guinea	Ethiopia	Nigeria
3	1981	Home sites	Egypt	2–0	Cameroon	Algeria	Nigeria
3	1981	Home sites	Egypt	1–1	Cameroon	Algeria	Nigeria
4	1983	Home sites	Nigeria	2–2	Ivory Coast	Algeria	Guinea
4	1983	Home sites	Nigeria	2–1	Ivory Coast	Algeria	Guinea
5	1985	Home sites	Nigeria	1–1	Tunisia	Ivory Coast	Ethiopia
5	1985	Home sites	Nigeria	2–1	Tunisia	Ivory Coast	Ethiopia
6	1987	Home sites	Nigeria	2–1	Togo	Morocco	Somalia
6	1987	Home sites	Nigeria	3–0	Togo	Morocco	Somalia
7	1989	Home sites	Nigeria	2–0	Mali	Algeria	Ivory Coast
7	1989	Home sites	Nigeria	2–1	Mali	Algeria	Ivory Coast

=== African Youth Championship (Host) ===
Edition	Year	Host nation	Final			Third Place Match		
Edition	Year	Host nation	Champion	Score	Second Place	Third Place	Score	Fourth Place
8	1991	Egypt	Egypt	2–1	Ivory Coast	Ghana	2–0	Zambia
9	1993	Mauritius	Ghana	2–0	Cameroon	Egypt	3–0	Ethiopia
10	1995	Nigeria	Cameroon	4–0	Burundi	Nigeria	1–0	Mali
11	1997	Morocco	Morocco	1–0	South Africa	Ivory Coast	2–0	Ghana
12	1999	Ghana	Ghana	1–0	Nigeria	Cameroon	2–1	Zambia
13	2001	Ethiopia	Angola	2–0	Ghana	Egypt	2–0	Ethiopia
14	2003	Burkina Faso	Egypt	4–3 (a.e.t.)	Ivory Coast	Mali	1–1 (5–4 p)	Burkina Faso
15	2005	Benin	Nigeria	2–0	Egypt	Benin	1–1 (a.e.t.) (5–3 p)	Morocco
16	2007	Republic of the Congo	Congo	1–0	Nigeria	Gambia	3–1	Zambia
17	2009	Rwanda	Ghana	2–0	Cameroon	Nigeria	2–1	South Africa

=== African U-20 Championship ===
Edition	Year	Host nation	Final			Third Place Match		
Edition	Year	Host nation	Champion	Score	Second Place	Third Place	Score	Fourth Place
18	2011	South Africa	Nigeria	3–2 (a.e.t.)	Cameroon	Egypt	1–0	Mali
19	2013	Algeria	Egypt	1–1 (a.e.t.) (5–4 p)	Ghana	Nigeria	2–1	Mali
20	2015	Senegal	Nigeria	1–0	Senegal	Ghana	3–1	Mali

=== U-20 Africa Cup of Nations ===
Edition	Year	Host nation	Final			Third Place Match		
Edition	Year	Host nation	Champion	Score	Second Place	Third Place	Score	Fourth Place
21	2017	Zambia	Zambia	2–0	Senegal	Guinea	2–1	South Africa
22	2019	Niger	Mali	1–1 (a.e.t.) (3–2 p)	Senegal	South Africa	0–0 (5–3 p)	Nigeria
23	2021	Mauritania	Ghana	2–0	Uganda	Gambia	0–0 (a.e.t.) (4–2 p)	Tunisia
24	2023	Egypt	Senegal	2–0	Gambia	Nigeria	4–0	Tunisia
25	2025	Egypt (Note: Originally scheduled to be hosted in Ivory Coast, who pulled out of hosting a month before commencement "due to unforeseen circumstances".)	South Africa	1–0	Morocco	Nigeria	1–1 (4–1 p)	Egypt
26	2027	Ghana		–			–	

== Performance by nation ==
Rank	Team	Champions	Runners-up	Third-place	Fourth-place	Semi-finalists
1	Nigeria	7 (1983, 1985, 1987, 1989, 2005, 2011, 2015)	2 (1999, 2007)	5 (1995*, 2009, 2013, 2023, 2025)	1 (2019)	2 (1979, 1981)
2	Ghana	4 (1993, 1999*, 2009, 2021)	2 (2001, 2013)	2 (1991, 2015)	1 (1997)	–
3	Egypt	4 (1981, 1991*, 2003, 2013)	1 (2005)	3 (1993, 2001, 2011)	1 (2025)	–
4	Cameroon	1 (1995)	4 (1981, 1993, 2009, 2011)	1 (1999)	–	–
5	Senegal	1 (2023)	3 (2015*, 2017, 2019)	–	–	–
6	Mali	1 (2019)	1 (1989)	1 (2003)	4 (1995, 2011, 2013, 2015)	–
7	South Africa	1 (2025)	1 (1997)	1 (2019)	2 (2009, 2017)	–
8	Morocco	1 (1997*)	1 (2025)	–	1 (2005)	1 (1987)
9	Zambia	1 (2017*)	–	–	3 (1991, 1999, 2007)	–
10	Algeria	1 (1979)	–	–	–	3 (1981, 1983, 1989)
11	Angola	1 (2001)	–	–	–	–
11	Congo	1 (2007*)	–	–	–	–
12	Ivory Coast	–	3 (1983, 1991, 2003)	1 (1997)	–	2 (1985, 1989)
13	Gambia	–	1 (2023)	2 (2007, 2021)	–	–
15	Guinea	–	1 (1979)	1 (2017)	–	1 (1983)
16	Tunisia	–	1 (1985)	–	2 (2021, 2023)	–
17	Togo	–	1 (1987)	–	–	–
17	Burundi	–	1 (1995)	–	–	–
17	Uganda	–	1 (2021)	–	–	–
20	Benin	–	–	1 (2005*)	–	–
21	Ethiopia	–	–	–	2 (1993, 2001*)	2 (1979, 1985)
22	Somalia	–	–	–	–	1 (1987)
23	Burkina Faso	–	–	–	1 (2003*)	–

* = As hosts

== Champions by region ==
Regional federation	Champion(s)	Title(s)
WAFU (West Africa)	Nigeria (7), Ghana (4), Senegal (1), Mali (1)	13
UNAF (North Africa)	Egypt (4), Morocco (1), Algeria (1)	6
COSAFA (Southern Africa)	South Africa (1), Zambia (1), Angola (1)	3
UNIFFAC (Central Africa)	Cameroon (1), Congo (1)	2
CECAFA (East Africa)	-	0

== Participating nations ==
Team	1979	1981	1983	1985	1987	1989	(Egypt) 1991	(Mauritius) 1993	(Nigeria) 1995	(Morocco) 1997	(Ghana) 1999	(Ethiopia) 2001	(Burkina Faso) 2003	(Benin) 2005	(Republic of the Congo) 2007	(Rwanda) 2009	(South Africa) 2011	(Algeria) 2013	(Senegal) 2015	(Zambia) 2017	(Niger) 2019	(Mauritania) 2021	(Egypt) 2023	(Egypt) 2025	(Ghana) 2027	Years
Algeria	1st	SF	SF	1R	×	SF		•	•	•	•	•	•	•	•	•	•	GS	×	•	•	•	•	•	•	6
Angola	×	×	1R	1R	×	PR	×	×	•	•	GS	1st	•	GS	•	•	•	•	•	•	•	•	•	•	•	6
Benin	×	×	×	×	×	×	•	×	×	•	×	×	×	3rd	×	•	•	GS	•	×	•	•	QF	•	•	3
Burkina Faso	×	×	×	×	×	×	×	×	•	•	×	•	4th	•	GS	•	•	•	•	•	GS	QF	•	•	q	5
Burundi	×	×	×	×	×	×	×	×	2nd		•	×	•	×	•	•	•	×	•	•	GS	•	•	•	•	2
Cameroon	2R	2nd	QF	QF	1R	1R	GS	2nd	1st	•	3rd	GS	•	•	GS	2nd	2nd	•	•	GS	•	QF	•	•	q	17
Central African Republic	×	2R	×	×	×	×	×	×	×	×	×	×	×	×	×	×	•	×	×	×	•	QF	GS	GS	q	5
Congo	×	×	×	×	×	×	×		×	×	•	×	×	×	1st	•	•	•	GS	•	•	•	QF		•	3
DR Congo	×	×	×	×	×	1R	×	×	×	×	×	×	×	×	×	•	•	GS	•	•	•	•	•	QF	•	3
Egypt	1R	1st	QF	1R	QF	QF	1st	3rd	•	GS	•	3rd	1st	2nd	GS	GS	3rd	1st	•	GS	•	×	GS	4th	q	20
Equatorial Guinea	×	2R		×	×	×	×	×	×	×	×	•	•	×	•	×	•	×	×	×	•	•	×	•	×	1
Eswatini	×	×	1R	×	×	×	×	×	×	×	•	•	•	×	×	×	×	×	•	•	•	•	•	•	•	1
Ethiopia	SF	1R	×	SF	1R	×	GS	4th	•	•	•	4th	•	×	•	×	×	×	•	•	•	•	•	•	•	7
Gabon	×	PR	1R	×	×	QF		×	×	×	•	•	GS	×	•	•	•	GS	•	•	•	×	×	•	•	5
Gambia	×	×	1R	PR	×	×	•	×	×	×	×	•	×	•	3rd	•	GS	×		•	•	3rd	2nd	•	q	7
Ghana	×	×	×	1R		QF	3rd	1st	•	4th	1st	2nd	GS	•	•	1st	GS	2nd	3rd	•	GS	1st	•	QF	q	16
Guinea	2nd	1R	SF	QF	1R	1R		×	GS	•	GS	×	•	•	•	•	•	•	•	3rd	•	•	•	•	q	10
Ivory Coast	×	×	2nd	SF	QF	SF	2nd	×	•	3rd	•	×	2nd	GS	GS	GS	•	•	GS	•	•	•	•	•	•	11
Kenya	1R	×	×	×	×	×	×	•	×	•	×	•	×	×	•	•	•	•	•		•	•	×	GS	•	2
Lesotho	×	×	×	×	×	QF	•	×	•	×	•	•	×	GS	•	•	GS	×	×	•	•	•	•	•	•	3
Liberia	×	×		×	×	PR	×	×	×	×	•	×	×	×	×	•	×	•	•	•	•	×	•	•	•	1
Libya	1R	×	×	×	×	×	×	×	×	×	•	•	•	•	•	•	×	•	•	•	•	•	•	•	•	1
Malawi	×	×	×	×	×	×	×	×	•	×	GS	•	×	×	•	•	•	×	•	×	•	•	•	•	•	1
Mali	×	×	×	×	×	2nd	•	•	4th	GS	GS	GS	3rd	GS	•	GS	4th	4th	4th	GS	1st	•	•	•	•	13
Mauritania	×	1R	×	×	1R	×	•	•	×	•	×	×	×	×	•	•	×	•	•	•	•	GS	•	×	•	3
Mauritius	2R	×	×	×	×	×	×	GS	GS	•	×	•	×	×	•	•	•	•	×	•	•	×	•	×	•	3
Morocco	2R	1R	QF	QF	SF	1R	•	GS	•	1st	•	•	4th	GS	•	•	•	•	•	•	•	QF	•	2nd	q	13
Mozambique	×	×	×	PR	QF	×	×	×	×	×	•	•	•	•	•	•	•	•	•	•	•	GS	GS	•	q	5
Namibia	×	×	×	×	×	×	×	×	×	×	×	•	•	•	•	•	•	•	•	•	•	GS	•	•	•	1
Niger	×	×	×	×	×	×	•	×	•	×	×	×	×		•	•	×	•	•	•	GS	•	•	•	•	1
Nigeria	SF	SF	1st	1st	1st	1st	×	GS	3rd	•	2nd	GS	•	1st	2nd	3rd	1st	3rd	1st	•	4th	•	3rd	3rd	•	19
Rwanda	×	×	×	×	×	×	×	×	×	×	•	×	×	•	•	GS	•	•	•	•	•	×	×	•	•	1
Senegal	×	×	PR	×	×	PR	•	GS	GS	•	•	•	•	•	•	•	•	•	2nd	2nd	2nd	•	1st	QF	•	9
Sierra Leone	×	×	×	×	×	×	•	×	×	×	•	×	×	•	•	•	•	•	•	•	•	•	•	QF	•	1
Somalia	×	×	×	×	SF	×	×	×	×	×	×	•	•	•	×	×	×	×	•	•	•	•	×	×	×	1
South Africa	×	×	×	×	×	×	×	×	•	2nd	•	GS	GS	•	•	4th	GS	•	GS	4th	3rd	•	•	1st	q	10
South Sudan	Country didn't exist: part of Sudan																	×	×	×	•	•	QF	•	•	1
Sudan	×	×	1R	1R	×	×	×	×	•	GS	•	•	•	•	•	•	•	•	•	GS	•	•	•	•	q	5
Tanzania	×	×	×	×	×	×	×	×	×	•	•	•	•	×	×	×	•	•	•	×	•	GS	•	GS	q	3
Togo	×	1R	1R	×	2nd	×	×	•	•	×	•	×	•	×	•	×	•	×	•	×	•	•	•	•	•	3
Tunisia	2R	2R	1R	2nd	QF	1R		•	•	•	•	•	•	•	•	•	•	•	•	•	•	4th	4th	GS	•	8
Uganda	×	×	×	PR	PR	×	•	•	×	×	•	•	•	×	×	•	•	•	×		•	2nd	QF	•	•	4
Zambia	×	×	×	1R	1R	×	4th	×	GS	GS	4th	•	•	•	4th	•	•	•	GS	1st	•	•	GS	GS	•	11
Zimbabwe	×	2R	QF	QF		×	•	•	×	•	×	×	•	•	•	•	×	×	×	•	•	•	×	•	×	3

Legend

- 1st – Champions
- 2nd – Runners-up
- 3rd – Third place
- 4th – Fourth place
- SF – Semi-finals
- QF – Quarter-finals
- GS – Group stage
- PR – Preliminary round
- 1R – First round
- 2R – Second round
- q – Qualified
- — Hosts
- × – Did not enter
- • – Did not qualify
- × – Withdrew before qualification
- — Withdrew after qualification
- — Disqualified after qualification

== Participating nations by year of debut ==
Participating nations by debut (Until 1989, counted Round 1, after 1991 counting Final 16)

=== Before 1989 ===
- 1979: Algeria, Cameroon, Egypt, Ethiopia, Guinea, Kenya, Libya, Mauritius, Morocco, Nigeria, Tunisia
- 1981: Central African Republic, Equatorial Guinea, Mauritania, Togo, Zimbabwe
- 1983: Angola, Gabon, Gambia, Ivory Coast, Sudan, Swaziland
- 1985: Ghana, Zambia
- 1987: Somalia
- 1989: Congo, Lesotho, Mali

=== After 1991 ===
- 1991: Cameroon, Egypt (hosts), Ethiopia, Ghana, Ivory Coast, Zambia
- 1993: Mauritius (hosts), Morocco, Nigeria, Senegal
- 1995: Burundi, Guinea, Mali
- 1997: South Africa, Sudan
- 1999: Angola, Malawi
- 2003: Burkina Faso, Gabon
- 2005: Benin (hosts), Lesotho
- 2007: Congo (hosts), Gambia
- 2009: Rwanda (hosts)
- 2011: No new team
- 2013: Algeria, DR Congo
- 2015: No new team
- 2017: No new team
- 2019: Niger (hosts)
- 2021: Central African Republic, Mauritania (hosts), Mozambique, Namibia, Tanzania, Tunisia, Uganda
- 2023: South Sudan
- 2025: Kenya, Sierra Leone

=== Player awards ===
Year	Player of the tournament	Top goalscorer
1991		(Egypt) Moustafa Sadek
1993		
1995		
1997	(South Africa) Benni McCarthy	(South Africa) Benni McCarthy
1999		(Guinea) Ousmane Bangoura
2001	(Angola) António Mendonça	(Angola) Pedro Mantorras
2003		(Egypt) Emad Moteab
2005		(Morocco) Mouhcine Iajour
2007	(Republic of the Congo) Fabrice N'Guessi	(Zambia) Fwayo Tembo
2009	(Ghana) Ransford Osei	(Ghana) Ransford Osei
2011	(Cameroon) Edgar Salli	(Nigeria) Uche Nwofor
2013	(Egypt) Saleh Gomaa	(Nigeria) Aminu Umar
2015	(Ghana) Yaw Yeboah	(Nigeria) Musa Muhammed
2017	(Zambia) Patson Daka	(South Africa) Luther Singh
2019	(Senegal) Moussa N'Diaye	(Senegal) Youssouph Mamadou Badji
2021	(Ghana) Abdul Fatawu Issahaku	(Uganda) Derrick Kakooza
2023	(Senegal) Lamine Camara	(Senegal) Pape Diop
2025	(South Africa) Tylon Smith	(Sierra Leone) Momoh Kamara

== FIFA U-20 World Cup performances ==
Team	(Tunisia) 1977	(Japan) 1979	(Australia) 1981	(Mexico) 1983	(Soviet Union) 1985	(Chile) 1987	(Saudi Arabia) 1989	(Portugal) 1991	(Australia) 1993	(Qatar) 1995	(Malaysia) 1997	(Nigeria) 1999	(Argentina) 2001	(United Arab Emirates) 2003	(Netherlands) 2005	(Canada) 2007	(Egypt) 2009	(Colombia) 2011	(Turkey) 2013	(New Zealand) 2015	(South Korea) 2017	(Poland) 2019	(Argentina) 2023	(Chile) 2025	(Azerbaijan) (Uzbekistan) 2027	(Armenia) (Georgia (country)) 2029	Total
Algeria		QF																									1
Angola													R2														1
Benin															R1												1
Burkina Faso														R2													1
Burundi										R1																	1
Cameroon			R1						R1	QF		R2					R1	R2									6
Congo																R2											1
Egypt			QF					R1					3rd	R2	R1		R2	R2	R1					R1			9
Ethiopia													R1														1
Gambia																R2							R2				2
Ghana									2nd		4th	QF	2nd				1st		3rd	R2							7
Guinea		R1																			R1						2
Ivory Coast	R1			R1				R1			R1			R2													5
Mali							R1					3rd		R1				R1	R1	3rd		QF					7
Morocco	R1										R2				4th									1st			4
Nigeria				R1	3rd	R1	2nd					QF			2nd	QF	R2	QF	R2	R2		R2	QF	R2			14
Senegal																				4th	R2	QF	R1				4
South Africa											R1						R2				R1	R1		R2			5
Togo						R1																					1
Tunisia	R1				R1																		R2				3
Zambia												R1				R2					QF						3

Legend

- 1st – Champions
- 2nd – Runners-up
- 3rd – Third place
- 4th – Fourth place
- QF – Quarterfinals
- R2 – Round 2
- R1 – Round 1
- – Hosts
- q – Qualified for upcoming edition

== See also ==
- Africa Cup of Nations
- U-23 Africa Cup of Nations
- U-17 Africa Cup of Nations
- FIFA U-20 World Cup
