= João Ricciulli =

Bissau-Guinean footballer

Personal information
- Full name: João Pedro Gomes Ricciulli
- Date of birth: 10 October 1999 (age 27)
- Place of birth: Bissau, Guinea-Bissau
- Height: 1.94 m (6 ft 4 in)
- Position: Centre-back

Team information
- Current team: Differdange
- Number: 66

Youth career
- 2014–2020: Sporting CP

Senior career*
Years	Team	Apps	(Gls)
2020–2021	Sporting B	19	(1)
2021–2023	Vitória B	23	(1)
2024–2025	Guarda FC	16	(0)
2025–	Differdange	9	(2)

International career^{‡}
2022–	Guinea-Bissau	1	(0)
- * Club domestic league appearances and goals as of 13 June 2026 ‡ National team caps and goals as of 06:23, 26 March 2022 (UTC)

João Pedro Gomes Ricciulli (born 10 October 1999) is a Bissau-Guinean professional footballer who plays as a centre-back for Differdange in the Luxembourg National Division and the Guinea-Bissau national team.

== Club career ==
Ricciulli is a youth product of Sporting CP since 2014, and began his senior career with their reserves in the Campeonato de Portugal in 2020. On 10 August 2021, he transferred to Vitória B as they started in the Liga 3.

== International career ==
Ricciulli debuted with Guinea-Bissau in a friendly 3–0 win over Equatorial Guinea on 23 March 2022.

== Personal life ==
Ricciulli's twin brother, João Cláudio, is also a professional footballer.
