= Senegal national under-20 football team =

National under-20 association football team representing Senegal

Senegal U-20
- Nickname(s): Les Lions de la Teranga (Young Lions of Teranga)
- Association: Senegalese Football Federation
- Confederation: CAF (Africa)
- Sub-confederation: WAFU (West Africa)
- Head coach: Malick Daf
- Captain: Samba Diallo
- Most caps: Libasse Guèye (26)
- Top scorer: Samba Diallo (13)
- Home stadium: Stade Léopold Sédar Senghor
- FIFA code: SEN
| First colours | Second colours |

First international
- Senegal 0–2 Gambia (Senegambia?; 26 July 1982)

Biggest win
- Senegal 5–0 Bahrain (Riyadh, Saudi Arabia; 27 February 2020)

Biggest defeat
- Brazil 5–0 Senegal (Christchurch, New Zealand; 17 June 2015)

FIFA U-20 World Cup
- Appearances: 4 (first in 2015)
- Best result: Fourth place (2015)

Africa U-20 Cup of Nations
- Appearances: 6 (first in 1993)
- Best result: Champions (2023)

Arab Cup U-20
- Appearances: 2 (first in 2020)
- Best result: Champions (2020)
Medal record
Africa U-20 Cup of Nations
| Gold medal – first place | 2023 Egypt |
| Silver medal – second place | 2019 Niger |
| Silver medal – second place | 2017 Zambia |
| Silver medal – second place | 2015 Senegal |
Arab Cup U-20
| Gold medal – first place | 2020 Saudi Arabia |

The Senegal national U-20 football team (French: Équipe du Sénégal de football U-20), nicknamed Les Lions de la Teranga (young Lions of Teranga) is the feeder team for the Senegal national football team and is controlled by the Senegalese Football Federation. They are the current champions of the U-20 Africa Cup of Nations and their senior team are the current champions of the AFCON and the CHAN. The first time Senegal qualified for a World Cup was in 2015, where they managed to qualify for the semi-finals up until they lost against Brazil 5–0, their biggest defeat. They then went on to loss the third place match against fellow WAFU member Mali. Senegal ended up finishing in fourth place, their best performance in the tournament.

Senegal's first appearance in the Africa Cup of Nations was in 1993, when they drew 0–0 against Egypt. They then later lost to Ethiopia and Morocco respectively.

== Achievements ==
- Senegal U-20's have qualified for 4 FIFA U-20 World Cup finals.
- In 2007 & 2009 they got to the 1st Qualifying round, but got knocked out by Ghana (2007) & Nigeria (2009).
- In 2011 they got to the 2nd round, but got knocked out by Egypt.
- In the 2015 FIFA U-20 World Cup they reached the semi-finals of the finals tournament, losing 5–0 to Brazil and then losing 3–1 in the third-place match against Mali.
- In the 2019 FIFA U-20 World Cup, Amadou Sagna made the fastest goal in U-20 championships, 9.6 seconds after the beginning of the match against Tahiti.

=== 2023 U-20 World Cup ===
Being the current champion of Africa under-20, Senegal's favoritism to pass the stage was very big after an impressive display in the U-20 AFCON in Egypt, winning all games without conceding a goal as Senegal continued to conquer Africa. However, the 2023 FIFA U-20 World Cup became a total disaster for the Senegalese, as they started with a shock 0–1 defeat to Japan. Senegal also failed to hold the line properly against Israel in a humiliating 1–1 draw, where a Senegalese player even scored an own goal. Senegal improved against Colombia in the final match, and led 1–0 until the fifth minutes of added time in the second half when a late goal from the Colombian side ensured Senegal to finish bottom and suffer a group stage exit. This was the first-time ever in Senegalese football history, a national team of the country finished bottom of the table, a humiliating exit for the African champions. To make thing worse, Nigeria, Gambia and Tunisia, all three lost to Senegal in the earlier U-20 AFCON, successfully reached the knockout stage, ensuring Senegal's humiliation in the tournament.

== Competitive record ==
=== FIFA U-20 World Cup record ===
FIFA U-20 World Cup record
| Year | Round | GP | W | D^{1} | L | GS | GA |
|---|---|---|---|---|---|---|---|
| (Tunisia) 1977 | Did not qualify | | | | | | |
| (Japan) 1979 | Did not qualify | | | | | | |
| (Australia) 1981 | Did not qualify | | | | | | |
| (Mexico) 1983 | Did not qualify | | | | | | |
| (Soviet Union) 1985 | Did not qualify | | | | | | |
| (Chile) 1987 | Did not qualify | | | | | | |
| (Saudi Arabia) 1989 | Did not qualify | | | | | | |
| (Portugal) 1991 | Did not qualify | | | | | | |
| (Australia) 1993 | Did not qualify | | | | | | |
| (Qatar) 1995 | Did not qualify | | | | | | |
| (Malaysia) 1997 | Did not qualify | | | | | | |
| (Nigeria) 1999 | Did not qualify | | | | | | |
| (Argentina) 2001 | Did not qualify | | | | | | |
| (United Arab Emirates) 2003 | Did not qualify | | | | | | |
| (Netherlands) 2005 | Did not qualify | | | | | | |
| (Canada) 2007 | Did not qualify | | | | | | |
| (Egypt) 2009 | Did not qualify | | | | | | |
| (Colombia) 2011 | Did not qualify | | | | | | |
| (Turkey) 2013 | Did not qualify | | | | | | |
| (New Zealand) 2015 | Fourth place | 7 | 2 | 2 | 3 | 6 | 14 |
| (South Korea) 2017 | Round of 16 | 4 | 1 | 1 | 2 | 2 | 2 |
| (Poland) 2019 | Quarter-finals | 5 | 3 | 2 | 0 | 10 | 4 |
| (Indonesia) ~~2021~~ | Cancelled (Note: due to the COVID-19 pandemic, FIFA were forced to cancel the tournament) | | | | | | |
| (Argentina) 2023 | Group stage | 3 | 0 | 2 | 1 | 2 | 3 |
| (Chile) 2025 | Did not qualify | | | | | | |
| (Azerbaijan) (Uzbekistan) 2027 | to be determined | | | | | | |
| (Armenia) (Georgia (country)) 2029 | to be determined | | | | | | |
| Total | 4/26 | 19 | 6 | 7 | 6 | 20 | 23 |

^{1}Draws include knockout matches decided on penalty kicks.

=== Africa U-20 Cup of Nations ===
Africa U-20 Cup of Nations record
| Year | Result | GP | W | D | L | GS | GA |
|---|---|---|---|---|---|---|---|
| 1979 | Did not qualify | | | | | | |
| 1981 | Did not qualify | | | | | | |
| 1983 | Did not qualify | | | | | | |
| 1985 | Did not qualify | | | | | | |
| 1987 | Did not qualify | | | | | | |
| 1989 | Did not qualify | | | | | | |
| (Egypt) 1991 | Did not qualify | | | | | | |
| (Mauritius) 1993 | Group Stage | 3 | 0 | 1 | 2 | 1 | 5 |
| (Nigeria) 1995 | Group Stage | 3 | 0 | 2 | 1 | 2 | 3 |
| (Morocco) 1997 | Did not qualify | | | | | | |
| (Ghana) 1999 | Did not qualify | | | | | | |
| (Ethiopia) 2001 | Did not qualify | | | | | | |
| (Burkina Faso) 2003 | Did not qualify | | | | | | |
| (Benin) 2005 | Did not qualify | | | | | | |
| (Republic of the Congo) 2007 | Did not qualify | | | | | | |
| (Rwanda) 2009 | Did not qualify | | | | | | |
| (South Africa) 2011 | Did not qualify | | | | | | |
| (Algeria) 2013 | Did not qualify | | | | | | |
| (Senegal) 2015 | Runners-up | 5 | 2 | 1 | 2 | 9 | 10 |
| (Zambia) 2017 | Runners-up | 5 | 3 | 1 | 1 | 8 | 6 |
| (Niger) 2019 | Runners-up | 5 | 4 | 1 | 0 | 11 | 2 |
| (Mauritania) 2021 | Did not qualify | | | | | | |
| (Egypt) 2023 | Champions | 6 | 6 | 0 | 0 | 14 | 0 |
| Total | 6/23 | 27 | 15 | 6 | 6 | 45 | 26 |

=== Arab Cup U-20 ===
Arab Cup U-20 record (Note: Senegal have only been invited twice)
| Host nation(s) and year | Round | Pos | Pld | W | D | L | GF | GA | Squad |
|---|---|---|---|---|---|---|---|---|---|
| (Saudi Arabia) 2020 | Champions | 1st of 16 | 6 | 4 | 2 | 0 | 13 | 2 | Squad |
| (Egypt) 2021 | Quarter-finals | 6th of 16 | 3 | 2 | 1 | 0 | 11 | 3 | Squad |
| Total | Best: Champions | 2 / 5 | 9 | 6 | 3 | 0 | 24 | 5 | – |

== Results and fixtures ==
The following is a list of match results in the last 24 months, as well as any future matches that have been scheduled.

Win Draw Loss

== Players ==
=== Current squad ===
The following players were named in the squad for the 2025 U-20 Africa Cup of Nations, to be played between 27 April – 18 May 2025.

Caps and goals correct as of 2 May 2025, after the match against the Central African Republic.

| No. | Pos. | Player | Date of birth (age) | Caps | Goals | Club |
|---|---|---|---|---|---|---|
| 1 | GK | Mamadou Kara Seye | | 0 | 0 | (Senegalese Football Federation) Étoile Lusitana |
| 16 | GK | Mouhamed Sissokho | 21 January 2005 (age 21) | 1 | 0 | (Senegalese Football Federation) Amitié |
| 23 | GK | Alioune Sarr Ndao | | 0 | 0 | (Senegalese Football Federation) Sacré-Cœur |
| 2 | DF | Taly Dia | 10 July 2008 (age 18) | 0 | 0 | (Senegalese Football Federation) United Académie |
| 3 | DF | Ousmane Konaté | 15 March 2005 (age 21) | 1 | 0 | (Senegalese Football Federation) Douanes |
| 4 | DF | Fallou Diouf | 31 December 2006 (age 19) | 1 | 0 | (Senegalese Football Federation) Génération Foot |
| 12 | DF | Lassana Traoré | 6 May 2007 (age 19) | 1 | 0 | (Senegalese Football Federation) Diambars |
| 17 | DF | Ibrahima Diallo | 13 September 2007 (age 19) | 1 | 0 | (Senegalese Football Federation) Génération Foot |
| 20 | DF | Khalifa Babacar Diouf | | 0 | 0 | (Senegalese Football Federation) Douanes |
| 5 | MF | Omar Sarr | 6 January 2008 (age 18) | 0 | 0 | (Senegalese Football Federation) Diambars |
| 6 | MF | Pape Daouda Diong | 15 June 2006 (age 20) | 1 | 0 | (French Football Federation) Strasbourg |
| 8 | MF | Cheikh Tidiane Thiam | 7 November 2005 (age 20) | 1 | 1 | (Senegalese Football Federation) Oslo Football Academy |
| 10 | MF | Seydi Ababacar Diouck | | 1 | 0 | (Senegalese Football Federation) Pikine |
| 14 | MF | Pierre Dorival | 15 March 2006 (age 20) | 1 | 0 | (French Football Federation) Lyon |
| 15 | MF | Ousseynou Fall Seck | | 1 | 0 | (Senegalese Football Federation) AJEL de Rufisque |
| 7 | FW | Yaya Diémé | 16 October 2007 (age 19) | 1 | 0 | (Senegalese Football Federation) Diambars |
| 9 | FW | Ibrahima Dieng | 31 August 2005 (age 21) | 1 | 0 | (Senegalese Football Federation) Pikine |
| 11 | FW | Amidou Badji | 28 June 2006 (age 20) | 0 | 0 | (Senegalese Football Federation) Espoirs de Guédiawaye |
| 13 | FW | Abdourahmane Dia | 27 November 2005 (age 20) | 1 | 0 | (Senegalese Football Federation) Darou Salam |
| 18 | FW | Clayton Diandy | 29 July 2006 (age 20) | 1 | 0 | (Hellenic Football Federation) Aris Thessaloniki |
| 19 | FW | Papa Magueye Gaye | 15 May 2006 (age 20) | 1 | 0 | (Swiss Football Association) Sion |
| 21 | FW | Norbert Gomis | | 0 | 0 | (Senegalese Football Federation) Dakar |
| 22 | FW | Mame Mor Faye | 12 July 2005 (age 21) | 1 | 0 | (Turkish Football Federation) Esenler Erokspor |

=== Recent call-ups ===
The following players have also been selected for the Senegal Under-20 squad within the last twelve months and remain eligible for selection.

| No. | Pos. | Player | Date of birth (age) | Club |

== Head-to-head record ==
The following table shows Senegal's head-to-head record in the FIFA U-20 World Cup.

| Opponent | Pld | W | D | L | GF | GA | GD | Win % |
|---|---|---|---|---|---|---|---|---|
| Brazil | 1 | 0 | 0 | 1 | 0 | 5 | −5 | 0.00 |
| Colombia | 3 | 1 | 2 | 0 | 4 | 2 | +2 | 33.33 |
| Ecuador | 1 | 0 | 1 | 0 | 0 | 0 | +0 | 0.00 |
| Israel | 1 | 0 | 1 | 0 | 1 | 1 | +0 | 0.00 |
| Japan | 1 | 0 | 0 | 1 | 0 | 1 | −1 | 0.00 |
| Mali | 1 | 0 | 0 | 1 | 1 | 3 | −2 | 0.00 |
| Mexico | 1 | 0 | 0 | 1 | 0 | 1 | −1 | 0.00 |
| Nigeria | 1 | 1 | 0 | 0 | 2 | 1 | +1 | 100.00 |
| Poland | 1 | 0 | 1 | 0 | 0 | 0 | +0 | 0.00 |
| Portugal | 1 | 0 | 0 | 1 | 0 | 3 | −3 | 0.00 |
| Qatar | 1 | 1 | 0 | 0 | 2 | 1 | +1 | 100.00 |
| Saudi Arabia | 1 | 1 | 0 | 0 | 2 | 0 | +2 | 100.00 |
| South Korea | 1 | 0 | 1 | 0 | 3 | 3 | +0 | 0.00 |
| Tahiti | 1 | 1 | 0 | 0 | 3 | 0 | +3 | 100.00 |
| Ukraine | 1 | 0 | 1 | 0 | 1 | 1 | +0 | 0.00 |
| United States | 1 | 0 | 0 | 1 | 0 | 1 | −1 | 0.00 |
| Uzbekistan | 1 | 1 | 0 | 0 | 1 | 0 | +1 | 100.00 |
| Total | 19 | 6 | 7 | 6 | 20 | 23 | −3 | 31.58 |
