= Guinea-Bissau national under-20 football team =

National under-20 association football team representing Guinea-Bissau

Guinea-Bissau U-20
- Nickname: Djurtus
- Association: Federação de Futebol da Guiné-Bissau
- Confederation: CAF (Africa)
- Sub-confederation: WAFU (West Africa)
- Head coach: Francisco Tchuto
- Home stadium: Estádio 24 de Setembro
First colours	Second colours

U-20 Africa Cup of Nations
- Appearances: None

FIFA U-20 World Cup
- Appearances: None

The Guinea-Bissau national under-20 football team (Portuguese: Seleção Nacional de futebol da Guiné-Bissau Sub-20) represents Guinea-Bissau in men's international football at this age level. It is controlled by the Football Federation of Guinea-Bissau. the team competes for the FIFA U-20 World Cup. The under-20 team participates in the U-20 Africa Cup of Nations but never qualifies.

== Competitive record ==
=== FIFA U-20 World Cup record ===
FIFA U-20 World Cup record
Year	Round	GP	W	D^{1}	L	GS	GA
(Tunisia) 1977	Did not qualify						
(Japan) 1979	Did not qualify						
(Australia) 1981	Did not qualify						
(Mexico) 1983	Did not qualify						
(Soviet Union) 1985	Did not qualify						
(Chile) 1987	Did not qualify						
(Saudi Arabia) 1989	Did not qualify						
(Portugal) 1991	Did not qualify						
(Australia) 1993	Did not qualify						
(Qatar) 1995	Did not qualify						
(Malaysia) 1997	Did not qualify						
(Nigeria) 1999	Did not qualify						
(Argentina) 2001	Did not qualify						
(United Arab Emirates) 2003	Did not qualify						
(Netherlands) 2005	Did not qualify						
(Canada) 2007	Did not qualify						
(Egypt) 2009	Did not qualify						
(Colombia) 2011	Did not qualify						
(Turkey) 2013	Did not qualify						
(New Zealand) 2015	Did not qualify						
(South Korea) 2017	Did not qualify						
(Poland) 2019	Did not qualify						
(Argentina) 2023	Did not qualify						
(Chile) 2025	Did not qualify						
(Azerbaijan) (Uzbekistan) 2027	to be determined						
Total	0/25	0	0	0	0	0	0

^{1}Draws include knockout matches decided on penalty kicks.

== See also ==
- Guinea-Bissau national football team
- Guinea-Bissau national under-17 football team
