= Guinea national under-20 football team =

National under-20 association football team representing Guinea

Guinea Under-20
- Association: Guinean Football Federation
- Confederation: CAF (Africa)
- Sub-confederation: WAFU (West Africa)
- Home stadium: Stade du 28 Septembre
- FIFA code: GUI
First colours	Second colours

U-20 Africa Cup of Nations
- Appearances: 9 (first in 1995)
- Best result: Third place (2017)

FIFA U-20 World Cup
- Appearances: 2 (first in 1979)
- Best result: Group stage (1979, 2017)

The Guinea national under-20 football team is the under-20 football team of Guinea. It is controlled by the Guinean Football Federation.

== Competitive record ==
=== FIFA U-20 World Cup record ===
FIFA U-20 World Cup record
Year	Round	Position	GP	W	D	L	GF	GA
(Tunisia) 1977	Did not qualify							
(Japan) 1979	Group Stage	15th	3	0	0	3	0	10
1977–2015	Did not qualify							
(South Korea) 2017	Group Stage	23rd	3	0	1	2	1	9
(Poland) 2019	Did not qualify							
(Argentina) 2023	Did not qualify							
(Chile) 2025	Did not qualify							
(Azerbaijan) (Uzbekistan) 2027– (Armenia) (Georgia (country)) 2029	to be determined							
Total	Group Stage	2/25	6	0	1	5	1	19

== Head-to-head record ==
The following table shows Guinea's head-to-head record in the FIFA U-20 World Cup.

Opponent	Pld	W	D	L	GF	GA	GD	Win %
Argentina	1	0	0	1	0	5	−5	0.00
England	1	0	1	0	1	1	+0	0.00
Hungary	1	0	0	1	0	2	−2	0.00
South Korea	1	0	0	1	0	3	−3	0.00
Soviet Union	1	0	0	1	0	3	−3	0.00
Uruguay	1	0	0	1	0	5	−5	0.00
Total	6	0	1	5	1	19	−18	0.00
