= Mali national under-20 football team =

National under-20 association football team representing Mali

Mali U-20
- Nickname: The Eagles
- Association: Malian Football Federation
- Confederation: CAF (Africa)
- Head coach: Mahamoutou Kane
- Home stadium: Stade du 26 Mars
- FIFA code: MLI
First colours	Second colours

U-20 Africa Cup of Nations
- Appearances: 13 (first in 1989)
- Best result: Champions (2019)

FIFA U-20 World Cup
- Appearances: 7 (first in 1989)
- Best result: Third place (1999, 2015)

The Mali national under-20 football team represents Mali in association football at an under-20 age level and is controlled by the Malian Football Federation, the governing body for football in Mali. The current coach is Mahamoutou Kane.

Their greatest achievement to date is finishing third in both the 1999 FIFA World Youth Championship and in the 2015 FIFA U-20 World Cup, where they defeated Senegal 3-1 in the third-place match.

== Competitive record ==
=== FIFA U-20 World Cup ===
Third Place

Year	Round	GP	W	D	L	GS	GA
(Tunisia) 1977	Did not qualify						
(Japan) 1979	Did not qualify						
(Australia) 1981	Did not qualify						
(Mexico) 1983	Did not qualify						
(Soviet Union) 1985	Did not qualify						
(Chile) 1987	Did not qualify						
(Saudi Arabia) 1989	Group stage	3	0	1	2	1	9
(Portugal) 1991	Did not qualify						
(Australia) 1993	Did not qualify						
(Qatar) 1995	Did not qualify						
(Malaysia) 1997	Did not qualify						
(Nigeria) 1999	Third place	7	5	0	2	16	14
(Argentina) 2001	Did not qualify						
(United Arab Emirates) 2003	Group stage	3	1	0	2	4	7
(Netherlands) 2005	Did not qualify						
(Canada) 2007	Did not qualify						
(Egypt) 2009	Did not qualify						
(Colombia) 2011	Group stage	3	0	0	3	0	6
(Turkey) 2013	Group stage	3	0	2	1	2	5
(New Zealand) 2015	Third place	7	3	2	2	11	7
(South Korea) 2017	Did not qualify						
(Poland) 2019	Quarter-finals	5	1	2	2	11	13
(Argentina) 2023	Did not qualify						
(Chile) 2025	Did not qualify						
(Azerbaijan) (Uzbekistan) 2027	to be determined						
(Armenia) (Georgia (country)) 2029	to be determined						
Total	7/26	31	10	7	14	45	61

== Players ==
=== Current squad ===
The following players were called up for the 2025 Maurice Revello Tournament to be played in June 2025.

Caps and goals correct as of 21 September 2024, after the match against Senegal

No.	Pos.	Player	Date of birth (age)	Caps	Goals	Club
	GK	Émile Doucouré	28 September 2007 (age 19)	0	0	(Royal Belgian Football Association) Beerschot
	GK	Oumar Pona	21 June 2006 (age 20)	0	0	(French Football Federation) Angers
	GK	Mayamé Sissoko	26 September 2004 (age 22)	0	0	(French Football Federation) Quevilly-Rouen Métropole
	DF	Ibrahim Diarra	7 April 2006 (age 20)	0	0	(Portuguese Football Federation) Sporting CP
	DF	Cheick Doumbia	18 October 2004 (age 21)	0	0	(French Football Federation) Rodez
	DF	Fousseny Doumbia	23 February 2005 (age 21)	0	0	(German Football Association) Eintracht Frankfurt
	DF	Eden Gassama	26 July 2005 (age 21)	0	0	(French Football Federation) Guingamp
	DF	Souleymane Sagnan	6 May 2005 (age 21)	0	0	(French Football Federation) Lens
	DF	Séga Sanogo	15 July 2005 (age 21)	0	0	(French Football Federation) Troyes
	DF	Dan Sinaté	9 June 2006 (age 20)	0	0	(French Football Federation) Angers
	DF	Isiaka Soukouna	27 February 2006 (age 20)	0	0	(French Football Federation) Rennes
	MF	Sekou Koné	3 February 2006 (age 20)	0	0	(The Football Association) Manchester United
	MF	Hamidou Makalou	15 July 2006 (age 20)	0	0	(French Football Federation) Brest
	MF	Ousmane Thiero	8 April 2006 (age 20)	0	0	(Austrian Football Association) Rapid Wien
	MF	Ange Martial Tia	20 November 2006 (age 19)	0	0	(French Football Federation) Reims
	FW	Mahamoud Barry	11 June 2006 (age 20)	0	0	(Royal Spanish Football Federation) Villarreal
	FW	Gaoussou Diakité	26 September 2005 (age 21)	0	0	(Austrian Football Association) Red Bull Salzburg
	FW	Ibrahim Diarra	12 December 2006 (age 19)	0	0	(Royal Spanish Football Federation) Barcelona
	FW	Mamadou Doumbia	18 February 2006 (age 20)	0	0	(The Football Association) Watford
	FW	Ibrahim Kanaté	23 October 2006 (age 19)	0	0	(Royal Belgian Football Association) Anderlecht
	FW	Abdoulaye Niakaté	1 October 2004 (age 22)	0	0	(French Football Federation) Caen
	FW	Wilson Samaké	30 March 2004 (age 22)	0	0	(French Football Federation) Rennes
	FW	Aboubacar Sidibé	7 February 2006 (age 20)	0	0	(French Football Federation) Sochaux

== Achievements ==
- Africa U-20 Cup of Nations
  - Champions: 2019
  - Runners-up: 1989
  - Third place: 2003
- FIFA U-20 World Cup
  - Third place: 1999, 2015

== Head-to-head record ==
The following table shows Mali's head-to-head record in the FIFA U-20 World Cup.

Opponent	Pld	W	D	L	GF	GA	GD	Win %
Argentina	2	0	1	1	3	5	−2	0.00
Brazil	1	0	0	1	0	5	−5	0.00
Cameroon	1	1	0	0	5	4	+1	100.00
Colombia	1	0	0	1	0	2	−2	0.00
East Germany	1	0	0	1	0	3	−3	0.00
France	2	0	0	2	2	5	−3	0.00
Germany	1	0	1	0	1	1	+0	0.00
Ghana	1	1	0	0	3	0	+3	100.00
Greece	1	0	1	0	0	0	+0	0.00
Italy	1	0	0	1	2	4	−2	0.00
Mexico	2	1	0	1	3	4	−1	50.00
Nigeria	1	1	0	0	3	1	+2	100.00
Panama	1	0	1	0	1	1	+0	0.00
Paraguay	1	0	1	0	1	1	+0	0.00
Portugal	1	1	0	0	2	1	+1	100.00
Saudi Arabia	1	1	0	0	4	3	+1	100.00
Senegal	1	1	0	0	3	1	+2	100.00
Serbia	2	0	0	2	1	4	−3	0.00
South Korea	2	0	0	2	2	6	−4	0.00
Spain	2	0	0	2	1	5	−4	0.00
United States	1	0	1	0	1	1	+0	0.00
Uruguay	3	2	1	0	4	2	+2	66.67
Uzbekistan	1	1	0	0	3	2	+1	100.00
Total	31	10	7	14	45	61	−16	32.26

== See also ==
- Mali national football team
- Mali national under-17 football team
