= 2021 U-20 Africa Cup of Nations qualification =

2021 Africa U-20 Cup of Nations qualification
Tournament details
- Host countries: Tunisia (North Zone); Senegal (West A Zone); Benin (West B Zone); Equatorial Guinea (Central Zone); Tanzania (Central-East Zone); South Africa (South Zone)
- Dates: 20 November – 27 December 2020
- Teams: 47 (from 1 confederation)

Tournament statistics
- Matches played: 66
- Goals scored: 164 (2.48 per match)
- Top scorer(s): (Tanzania) Abdul Hamisi Suleiman (Uganda) Ivan Bogere (5 goals each)

The 2021 Africa U-20 Cup of Nations qualification was a men's under-20 football competition which decided the participating teams for the 2021 Africa U-20 Cup of Nations.

Players born 1 January 2001 or later were eligible to participate in the competition. A total of twelve teams qualified to play in the final tournament, including Mauritania who qualified automatically as hosts.

== Teams ==
47 of the 54 CAF members entered the qualifying tournament of their zone, including the hosts Mauritania, which also participated in qualification despite automatically qualified for the final tournament.

This was the first edition in Africa U-20 Cup of Nations to have expanded to 12 teams instead of eight. Each of the six zones received two spots in the final tournament.

Zone	Spots	Teams entering qualification	Did not enter
North Zone (UNAF)	2 spot	Algeria; Egypt; Libya; **Morocco**; **Tunisia** **(H)**	
West A Zone (WAFU-UFOA A)	1 spot + hosts	**Gambia**; Guinea; Guinea-Bissau; Mali; **Mauritania** **(Q)**; Senegal **(H)**; Sierra Leone	Cape Verde; Liberia
West B Zone (WAFU-UFOA B)	2 spots	Benin **(H)**; **Burkina Faso**; **Ghana**; Ivory Coast; Niger; Nigeria; Togo	
Central Zone (UNIFFAC)	2 spots	**Cameroon**; **Central African Republic**; Chad; Congo; DR Congo; Equatorial Guinea **(H)**	Gabon; São Tomé and Príncipe
Central-East Zone (CECAFA)	2 spots	Burundi; Djibouti; Eritrea; Ethiopia; Kenya; Rwanda; Somalia; South Sudan; Sudan; **Tanzania** **(H)**; **Uganda**	
South Zone (COSAFA)	2 spots	Angola; Botswana; Comoros; Eswatini; Lesotho; Malawi; **Mozambique**; **Namibia**; South Africa **(H)**; Zambia; Zimbabwe	Madagascar; Mauritius; Seychelles

Notes

- Teams in **bold** qualified for the final tournament.
- (H): Qualifying tournament hosts
- (Q): Automatically qualified for final tournament regardless of qualification results

== Schedule ==
The qualifying competition was split into regional competitions, with the teams entering the qualifying tournament of their zone. The final arrangements of the zonal qualifiers were decided later due to the delays caused by the COVID-19 pandemic. The schedule of each qualifying zone was as follows.

Zone	Group stage	Knockout stage
West A Zone	20–25 November 2020	27–29 November 2020
Central-East Zone	22–27 November 2020	30 November–2 December 2020
Central-East Zone	Originally set to be played at the beginning of October/November 2020 in Sudan	
South Zone	3–9 December 2020	11–13 December 2020
South Zone	Originally set to be played in Mauritius in the same time period	
West B Zone	5–12 December 2020	15–19 December 2020
West B Zone	Originally from 12 to 26 September 2020 in Burkina Faso	
Central Zone	15–19 December 2020	22 December 2020
Central Zone	Postponed, originally set to be played at the beginning of/mid October 2020	
North Zone	15–27 December 2020	—

== North Zone ==
Tunisia hosted the 2020 UNAF U-20 Tournament, which also served as the qualifiers for the Africa U-20 Cup of Nations, between 15 and 27 December 2020. The matches were played at Radès (Stade Olympique de Radès) and Tunis (Stade El Menzah).

The draw for the fixtures was held on 30 November 2020. The five teams were placed in one group, with the winners and the runners-up qualifying for the final tournament.

All times are local, CET (UTC+1).

Pos	Team	Pld	W	D	L	GF	GA	GD	Pts	Qualification
1	Morocco	3	1	2	0	2	1	+1	5	2021 Africa U-20 Cup of Nations
2	Tunisia (H)	3	1	2	0	2	1	+1	5	2021 Africa U-20 Cup of Nations
3	Libya	3	1	1	1	2	2	0	4	
4	Algeria	3	0	1	2	1	3	−2	1	
5	Egypt	0	0	0	0	0	0	0	0	Withdrew (Note: On 19 December 2020, Egypt were forced to withdraw from the competition after they were unable to play their first two matches due to a number of players testing positive for the SARS-2 coronavirus. After their withdrawal from the competition, Egypt's results were deleted from the calculations of the final group rankings.)

Source: UNAF
Rules for classification: 1) Points; 2) Goal difference; 3) Goals scored
(H) Hosts
Notes:
15 December 2020
14:00

Tunisia	1–1	Algeria
Ben Lamin 33'	Report	Belloumi 12'

Stade Olympique de Radès, Radès
Referee: Ahmed El-Ghandour (Egypt)
15 December 2020
14:00

Libya	Voided (2–0 (awarded)) (Note: The UNAF qualifiers match between Libya and Egypt, and Egypt and Tunisia, to be played on 15 December and 18 December respectively, but were scratched as Egypt were unable to field 15 players due to their squad members testing positive for SARS-2 coronavirus. Subsequently, Libya and Tunisia were awarded a technical 2–0 victory by CAF in accordance with the regulations related to COVID-19.))	Egypt
	Report

Stade El Menzah, Tunis
Referee: Lotfi Bekouassa (Algeria)

18 December 2020
14:00

Egypt	Voided (0–2 (awarded)))	Tunisia

Stade Olympique de Radès, Radès
18 December 2020
14:00

Algeria	0–1	Morocco
	Report	Maouhoub 76'

Stade El Menzah, Tunis
Referee: Mehrez Melki (Tunisia)

21 December 2020
14:00

Morocco	0–0	Tunisia
	Report

Stade Olympique de Radès, Radès
Referee: Mutaz Ibrahim Al-Shalmani (Libya)
21 December 2020
14:00

Libya	1–0	Algeria
Bara 17' (o.g.)	Report

Stade El Menzah, Tunis
Referee: Jalal Jayed (Morocco)

24 December 2020
14:00

Algeria	Cancelled	Egypt

Stade El Menzah, Tunis
24 December 2020
14:00

Morocco	1–1	Libya
Targhalline 32' (pen.)	Report	El Khali 48'

Stade Olympique de Radès, Radès
Referee: Ahmed El-Ghandour (Egypt)

27 December 2020
14:00

Tunisia	1–0	Libya
Labidi 85'	Report

Stade Olympique de Radès, Radès
Referee: Lotfi Bekouassa (Algeria)
27 December 2020
14:00

Egypt	Cancelled	Morocco

Stade El Menzah, Tunis

== West A Zone ==
Senegal hosted the WAFU-UFOA Zone A U-20 Championship between 20 and 29 November 2020. The matches were played at Thiès (Stade Lat-Dior) and Pikine (Stade Al Djigo).

All times are local, GMT (UTC±0).

=== Group stage ===
The draw for the group stage was held on 6 November 2020. The seven teams were drawn into two groups of three and four teams. The winners and the runners-up of each group advanced to the semi-finals.

==== Group A ====
Pos	Team	Pld	W	D	L	GF	GA	GD	Pts	Qualification
1	Senegal (H)	2	1	1	0	6	2	+4	4	Semi-finals
2	Gambia	2	1	0	1	3	6	−3	3	Semi-finals
3	Sierra Leone	2	0	1	1	2	3	−1	1	

Rules for classification: Group tiebreakers
(H) Hosts
20 November 2020
17:00

Senegal	1–1	Sierra Leone
Diallo 68'	Report	Musa 55'

Stade Lat-Dior, Thiès
Referee: Ousmane Diakaté (Mali)

22 November 2020
17:00

Gambia	1–5	Senegal
Bojang 45' (pen.)	Report	Diallo 5'; Lopy 45+2' (pen.), 48'; Bâ 52' (pen.); Mandefu 89'

Stade Lat-Dior, Thiès
Referee: Bonifacio Silva (Guinea-Bissau)

24 November 2020
17:00

Sierra Leone	1–2	Gambia
A. Conteh 89'	Report	Kanteh 51'; Bojang 86'

Stade Lat-Dior, Thiès
Referee: Younousa Camara (Guinea)

==== Group B ====
Pos	Team	Pld	W	D	L	GF	GA	GD	Pts	Qualification
1	Guinea	3	3	0	0	6	1	+5	9	Semi-finals
2	Guinea-Bissau	3	2	0	1	3	2	+1	6	Semi-finals
3	Mali	3	1	0	2	2	5	−3	3	
4	Mauritania	3	0	0	3	0	3	−3	0	

Rules for classification: Group tiebreakers
21 November 2020
16:00

Mali	0–2 (awarded) (Note: The West A Zone group stage match between Mali and Guinea-Bissau to be played on 21 November 2020, 16:00 GMT, at Stade Lat-Dior, Thiès, could not be played due to eight players from Mali testing positive for SARS-2 coronavirus. Mali thus were not able to name the required 15 players for holding the match and subsequently Guinea-Bissau were awarded a technical 2–0 victory by CAF in accordance with the regulations related to COVID-19.)	Guinea-Bissau
	Report

Stade Lat-Dior, Thiès
Referee: Elhadji Amadou Sy (Senegal)
21 November 2020
19:00

Guinea	1–0	Mauritania
Bah 8'	Report

Stade Lat-Dior, Thiès
Referee: Hassan Corneh (Liberia)

23 November 2020
16:00

Guinea	3–1	Mali
A. Soumah 55' (pen.); Bérété 73', 76'	Report	Diaby 87'

Stade Lat-Dior, Thiès
Referee: Lamin Jammeh (Gambia)
23 November 2020
19:00

Mauritania	0–1	Guinea-Bissau
	Report	Sanha 31'

Stade Lat-Dior, Thiès
Referee: Adalbert Diouf (Senegal)

25 November 2020
16:00

Mali	1–0	Mauritania
Keïta 9'

Stade Lat-Dior, Thiès
Referee: António Rodrigues (Cape Verde)
25 November 2020
19:00

Guinea	2–0	Guinea-Bissau
M. Somah 14' (pen.); Bah 31'	Report

Stade Al Djigo, Pikine
Referee: Adalbert Diouf (Senegal)

=== Knockout stage ===
Semi-finals
27 November – Thiès
Guinea	1
Gambia	2
27 November – Thiès
Senegal (p)	0 (5)
Guinea-Bissau	0 (4)

Final
29 November – Thiès
Gambia (p)	2 (4)
Senegal	2 (3)

==== Semi-finals ====
27 November 2020
16:00

Guinea	1–2	Gambia
Bah 49'	Report	Camara 30' (o.g.); Drammeh 64'

Stade Lat-Dior, Thiès
Referee: António Rodrigues (Cape Verde)
27 November 2020
19:30

Senegal	0–0 (a.e.t.)	Guinea-Bissau
	Report
Penalties
Lopy (penalty scored); M. L. Camara (penalty scored); Bâ (penalty scored); Seydi (penalty scored); Gueye (penalty scored)	5–4	(penalty scored) Iala; (penalty scored) Cassamá; (penalty scored) Fernandes; (penalty scored) Correia; (penalty missed) Monteiro

Stade Lat-Dior, Thiès
Referee: Hassan Corneh (Liberia)

==== Final ====
Winner qualified for 2021 Africa U-20 Cup of Nations.

29 November 2020
17:00

Gambia	2–2 (a.e.t.)	Senegal
Mendy 4'; Drammeh 57'	Report	Lopy 43'; Gueye 67'
Penalties
Bojang (penalty scored); Marr (penalty scored); Ceesay (penalty scored); Gomez (penalty missed); Drammeh (penalty missed); Kanteh (penalty scored)	4–3	(penalty scored) Lopy; (penalty scored) M. L. Camara; (penalty missed) Diao; (penalty scored) Seydi; (penalty missed) Gueye; (penalty missed) Dramé

Stade Lat-Dior, Thiès
Referee: Mohamed Abdelaziz Bouh (Mauritania)

== West B Zone ==
The WAFU-UFOA Zone B qualifiers for the Africa U-20 Cup of Nations were initially planned to be hosted by Burkina Faso, but were later shifted to Togo due to the COVID-19 pandemic, with the matches scheduled to be played between 18 November–2 December. On 7 November, Togo announced that they would not be able to host the tournament due to a resurgence of COVID-19 cases in the country, with the outbreak located in the Lomé area.

On 17 November, it was announced that the regional qualifiers would now be played in Benin between 5 and 19 December. The draw was also announced on the same day. The matches were played at Porto-Novo (Stade Charles de Gaulle) and Cotonou (Stade René Pleven).

All times are local, WAT (UTC+1).

=== Group stage ===
The seven teams were drawn into two groups of three and four teams. The winners and the runners-up of each group advanced to the semi-finals.

==== Group A ====
Pos	Team	Pld	W	D	L	GF	GA	GD	Pts	Qualification
1	Niger	3	1	2	0	2	1	+1	5	Semi-finals
2	Burkina Faso	3	1	2	0	2	1	+1	5	Semi-finals
3	Benin (H)	3	1	0	2	2	2	0	3	
4	Togo	3	0	2	1	2	4	−2	2	

Rules for classification: Group tiebreakers
(H) Hosts
5 December 2020
16:00

Benin	0–1	Niger
	Report	Litnine 40'

Stade Charles de Gaulle, Porto-Novo
Referee: Clement Franklin Kpan (Ivory Coast)
5 December 2020
19:00

Togo	1–1	Burkina Faso
Dermane 38' (pen.)	Report	Botué 64'

Stade Charles de Gaulle, Porto-Novo
Referee: Abubakar Nuruddeen (Nigeria)

8 December 2020
16:00

Benin	2–0	Togo
Gomez 15', 30'	Report

Stade Charles de Gaulle, Porto-Novo
Referee: Benjamin Sefah (Ghana)
8 December 2020
19:00

Niger	0–0	Burkina Faso
	Report

Stade Charles de Gaulle, Porto-Novo
Referee: Clement Franklin Kpan (Ivory Coast)

11 December 2020
16:00

Burkina Faso	1–0	Benin
Ouédraogo 54'	Report

Stade Charles de Gaulle, Porto-Novo
Referee: Benjamin Sefah (Ghana)
11 December 2020
16:00

Niger	1–1	Togo
Moustapha 14'	Report	Dermane 59'

Stade René Pleven, Cotonou
Referee: Abubakar Nuruddeen (Nigeria)

==== Group B ====
Pos	Team	Pld	W	D	L	GF	GA	GD	Pts	Qualification
1	Ivory Coast	2	1	1	0	2	1	+1	4	Semi-finals
2	Ghana	2	1	0	1	1	1	0	3	Semi-finals
3	Nigeria	2	0	1	1	1	2	−1	1	

Rules for classification: Group tiebreakers
6 December 2020
16:00

Nigeria	1–1	Ivory Coast
Nwaeze 60'	Report	Bi Broh 90+1'

Stade Charles de Gaulle, Porto-Novo
Referee: Gnama Aklesso (Togo), replaced by Stanislas Ahomlanto (Benin)(46')

9 December 2020
16:00

Ghana	1–0	Nigeria
Boah 83'	Report

Stade Charles de Gaulle, Porto-Novo
Referee: Vincent Kaboré (Burkina Faso)

12 December 2020
16:00

Ivory Coast	1–0	Ghana
N'Guessan 63'	Report

Stade Charles de Gaulle, Porto-Novo
Referee: Moussa Ahmadou Alou (Niger)

=== Knockout stage ===
Semi-finals
15 December – Stade de Gaulle
Niger	0 (3)
Ghana (p)	0 (5)
15 December – Stade de Gaulle
Ivory Coast	1
Burkina Faso	4

Final
19 December – Stade de Gaulle
Ghana	2
Burkina Faso	1
Third place
18 December – Stade de Gaulle
Niger	0
Ivory Coast	2

==== Semi-finals ====
Winners qualified for 2021 Africa U-20 Cup of Nations.

15 December 2020
15:30

Niger	0–0 (a.e.t.)	Ghana
	Report
Penalties
Ousmane (penalty missed); Litnine (penalty scored); Moumouni (penalty scored); Moustapha (penalty scored)	3–5	(penalty scored) Essu; (penalty scored) Mugees; (penalty scored) Boah; (penalty scored) Sulemana; (penalty scored) Boateng

Stade Charles de Gaulle, Porto-Novo
Referee: Stanislas Ahomlanto (Benin)
15 December 2020
19:00

Ivory Coast	1–4	Burkina Faso
Ouattara 29' (pen.)	Report	Ouattara 10'; Botué 13'; Bancé 73' (pen.); Ouédraogo 86'

Stade Charles de Gaulle, Porto-Novo
Referee: Raphiou Ligali (Benin)

==== Third place match ====
18 December 2020
16:00

Niger	0–2	Ivory Coast
		Ouattara 66'; Salifou 70' (o.g.)

Stade Charles de Gaulle, Porto-Novo
Referee: Vincent Kaboré (Burkina Faso)

==== Final ====
19 December 2020
16:00

Ghana	2–1	Burkina Faso
Afriyie 21'; Boah 78'	Report	Botué 15'

Stade Charles de Gaulle, Porto-Novo
Referee: Clement Franklin Kpan (Ivory Coast)

== Central Zone ==
The UNIFFAC qualifiers for the Africa U-20 Cup of Nations were held in Equatorial Guinea between 15 and 22 December 2020. The matches were played at Malabo (Estadio de Malabo).

All times are local, WAT (UTC+1).

=== Group stage ===
The six teams were drawn into two groups of three teams. The winners of each group qualified for the 2021 Africa U-20 Cup of Nations.

==== Group A ====
Pos	Team	Pld	W	D	L	GF	GA	GD	Pts	Qualification
1	Central African Republic	1	1	0	0	2	1	+1	3	Final and 2021 Africa U-20 Cup of Nations
2	Equatorial Guinea (H)	1	0	0	1	1	2	−1	0	
3	Chad	0	0	0	0	0	0	0	0	Withdrew

Rules for classification: Group tiebreakers
(H) Hosts
15 December 2020
13:30

Equatorial Guinea	Cancelled	Chad

Estadio de Malabo, Malabo

17 December 2020
16:00

Central African Republic	2–1	Equatorial Guinea
Yawenendji 15'; Ngoma 55'	Report	Obiang 82'

Estadio de Malabo, Malabo
Referee: Kabanga Malala (DR Congo)

19 December 2020
13:00

Chad	Cancelled	Central African Republic

Estadio de Malabo, Malabo

==== Group B ====
Pos	Team	Pld	W	D	L	GF	GA	GD	Pts	Qualification
1	Cameroon	2	1	1	0	4	2	+2	4	Final and 2021 Africa U-20 Cup of Nations
2	Congo	2	1	0	1	3	4	−1	3	
3	DR Congo	2	0	1	1	2	3	−1	1	

Rules for classification: Group tiebreakers
15 December 2020
16:30

Cameroon	1–1	DR Congo
Milla 18'	Report	Mtanga 73'

Estadio de Malabo, Malabo
Referee: Alhadj Allaou Mahamat (Chad)

17 December 2020
19:30

Congo	1–3	Cameroon
Louamba 28' (pen.)	Report	Bosco 23'; Onana 58'; Etouga 78'

Estadio de Malabo, Malabo
Referee: Liberato Nve Esimi Avomo (Equatorial Guinea)

19 December 2020
16:30

DR Congo	1–2	Congo
Mwamba 5' (pen.)	Report	Okouri 34' (pen.); Nzaou 56'

Estadio de Malabo, Malabo
Referee: Pierre Atcho (Gabon)

=== Final ===
22 December 2020
15:00

Central African Republic	0–3	Cameroon
	Report	Ibrahim 33'; Sunday 64', 76'

Estadio de Malabo, Malabo
Referee: Alhadj Allaou Mahamat (Chad)

== Central-East Zone ==
The CECAFA qualifiers for the Africa U-20 Cup of Nations were initially planned to be hosted by Sudan in October–November 2020 but were then later shifted and held in Tanzania between 22 November–2 December 2020. The matches were played at Karatu (Black Rhino Academy) and Arusha (Sheikh Amri Abeid Memorial Stadium).

All times are local, EAT (UTC+3).

=== Group stage ===
All the 11 teams were drawn into 3 groups, 2 groups of 4 teams and 1 group of 3 teams. The winners of each group and the best runners-up advanced to the semi-finals.

==== Group A ====
Pos	Team	Pld	W	D	L	GF	GA	GD	Pts	Qualification
1	Tanzania (H)	2	2	0	0	14	2	+12	6	Semi-finals
2	Djibouti	2	1	0	1	3	7	−4	3	
3	Somalia	2	0	0	2	2	10	−8	0	
4	Rwanda	0	0	0	0	0	0	0	0	Withdrew (Note: On 14 November 2020, Rwanda withdrew from the qualifiers after discussions between their sports ministry and the education ministry. The statement issued read that "Since after a long time in break due to the COVID-19, schools have just reopened and the students can't miss the school for the competition. Most of the U-20 players are students who need to be in school.")

Source: CECAFA
Rules for classification: Group tiebreakers
(H) Hosts
Notes:
22 November 2020
16:00

Tanzania	6–1	Djibouti
Theonasy 52'; Suleiman 65', 72', 90+1' (pen.); Hamdoun 82'; Haruna 88'	Report	Kamil 14'

Black Rhino Academy, Karatu
Referee: Ring Nyier Akech Malong (South Sudan)

24 November 2020
16:00

Djibouti	2–1	Somalia
Kamil 49' (pen.); Djama 87'	Report	Iman 4'

Black Rhino Academy, Karatu
Referee: Nsoro Ruzindana (Rwanda)

26 November 2020
16:00

Somalia	1–8	Tanzania
Muhumed 6'	Report	Suleiman 4'; Starkie 15'; John 29', 34', 60'; Haruna 48'; George 65'; Jabir 87'

Black Rhino Academy, Karatu
Referee: Mohamed Elsiddig Eltreefe (Sudan)

==== Group B ====
Pos	Team	Pld	W	D	L	GF	GA	GD	Pts	Qualification
1	Uganda	2	1	1	0	6	1	+5	4	Semi-finals
2	South Sudan	2	1	1	0	4	0	+4	4	Semi-finals
3	Burundi	2	0	0	2	1	10	−9	0	
4	Eritrea	0	0	0	0	0	0	0	0	Withdrew

Source: CECAFA
Rules for classification: Group tiebreakers
23 November 2020
16:00

South Sudan	0–0	Uganda
	Report

Sheikh Amri Abeid, Arusha
Referee: Saddam Mansour (Djibouti)

25 November 2020
13:00

Uganda	6–1	Burundi
Bogere 43', 51' (pen.); Yiga 45'; Mulugusi 52', 81'; Kizza 88'	Report	Nkurunziza 90+2'

Sheikh Amri Abeid, Arusha
Referee: Ahmed Hassan Hussein (Somalia)

27 November 2020
16:00

Burundi	0–4	South Sudan
	Report	Kundu 21'; Atari 35'; Ntunzwenimana 63' (o.g.); Biajo 89'

Sheikh Amri Abeid, Arusha
Referee: Israel Mpaima (Kenya)

==== Group C ====
Pos	Team	Pld	W	D	L	GF	GA	GD	Pts	Qualification
1	Kenya	2	2	0	0	5	1	+4	6	Semi-finals
2	Ethiopia	2	1	0	1	3	5	−2	3	
3	Sudan	2	0	0	2	3	5	−2	0	

Source: CECAFA
Rules for classification: Group tiebreakers
23 November 2020
13:00

Ethiopia	0–3	Kenya
	Report	Omalla 38'; Odede 46'; Wanyama 85'

Sheikh Amri Abeid, Arusha
Referee: Martin Sanya (Tanzania)

25 November 2020
16:00

Sudan	2–3	Ethiopia
Yousif 32', 45'	Report	Bayse 58', 79'; Balcha 72'

Sheikh Amri Abeid, Arusha
Referee: Florentina Zablon (Tanzania)

27 November 2020
13:00

Kenya	2–1	Sudan
Omoto 56'; Omalla 90+2'	Report	Nooh 84'

Sheikh Amri Abeid, Arusha
Referee: William Oloya (Uganda)

==== Ranking of second-placed teams ====
Pos	Grp	Team	Pld	W	D	L	GF	GA	GD	Pts	Qualification
1	B	South Sudan	2	1	1	0	4	0	+4	4	Semi-finals
2	C	Ethiopia	2	1	0	1	3	5	−2	3	
3	A	Djibouti	2	1	0	1	3	7	−4	3	

Rules for classification: Group tiebreakers

=== Knockout stage ===
Semi-finals
30 November – Karatu
Uganda	3
Kenya	1
30 November – Karatu
Tanzania	1
South Sudan	0

Final
2 December – Karatu
Uganda	4
Tanzania	1
Third place
2 December – Karatu
Kenya	1
South Sudan	2

==== Semi-finals ====
Winners qualified for 2021 Africa U-20 Cup of Nations.

30 November 2020
12:00

Uganda	3–1	Kenya
Semakula 22'; Bogere 26', 64' (pen.)	Report	Wanyama 81'

Black Rhino Academy, Karatu
Referee: Belay Tadesse (Ethiopia)
30 November 2020
15:30

Tanzania	1–0	South Sudan
Haruna 56'	Report

Black Rhino Academy, Karatu
Referee: Nsoro Ruzindana (Rwanda)

==== Third place match ====
2 December 2020
12:00

Kenya	1–2	South Sudan
Ochieng 13'	Report	Biajo 3'; Elia 41'

Black Rhino Academy, Karatu
Referee: Martin Saanya (Tanzania)

==== Final ====
2 December 2020
15:30

Uganda	4–1	Tanzania
Basangwa 12'; Sserwadda 45'; Bogere 61'; Semakula 72'	Report	Suleiman 30' (pen.)

Black Rhino Academy, Karatu
Referee: Mohamed Elsiddig Eltreefe (Sudan)

== South Zone ==
The COSAFA qualifiers for the Africa U-20 Cup of Nations were initially planned to be hosted by Mauritius, but were later shifted to South Africa after Mauritius withdrew as hosts due to the COVID-19 regulations. The matches were played at Port Elizabeth (Wolfson Stadium, Gelvandale Stadium and Nelson Mandela Bay Stadium).

All times are local, SAST (UTC+2).

=== Group stage ===
The group stage was played in 3 groups as a round-robin, where the group winners and the best runner up advanced to the semi-finals.

==== Group A ====
Pos	Team	Pld	W	D	L	GF	GA	GD	Pts	Qualification
1	Mozambique	3	2	1	0	3	0	+3	7	Semi-finals
2	South Africa (H)	3	1	2	0	9	2	+7	5	
3	Zimbabwe	3	1	1	1	6	5	+1	4	
4	Lesotho	3	0	0	3	1	12	−11	0	

Source: COSAFA.com
(H) Hosts
3 December 2020
12:30

Mozambique	1–0	Lesotho
Cipriano 9'	Report

Wolfson Stadium, Port Elizabeth
Referee: Akhona Makalima (South Africa)
3 December 2020
15:30

South Africa	2–2	Zimbabwe
Appollis 46'; Makola 90+1'	Report	Mutimbanyoka 9'; Mujokoro 75'

Wolfson Stadium, Port Elizabeth
Referee: Letticia Viana (Eswatini)

6 December 2020
12:30

Mozambique	2–0	Zimbabwe
Cipriano 58' (pen.); Pinho 85'	Report

Wolfson Stadium, Port Elizabeth
Referee: Ishmael Chizinga (Malawi)
6 December 2020
15:30

South Africa	7–0	Lesotho
Mohale 6' (o.g.); Human 17'; Mkiva 43', 62', 86'; Appollis 46'; Myeni 90'	Report

Wolfson Stadium, Port Elizabeth
Referee: Keabetswe Dintwa (Botswana)

8 December 2020
15:30

South Africa	0–0	Mozambique
	Report

Wolfson Stadium, Port Elizabeth
Referee: Lebalang Mokete (Lesotho)
8 December 2020
15:30

Zimbabwe	4–1	Lesotho
Monyaka 19' (o.g.); Mandinyenya 22'; Mangiza 33'; Antonio 66'	Report	Lebina 45+2'

Gelvandale Stadium, Port Elizabeth
Referee: Keabetswe Dintwa (Botswana)

==== Group B ====
Pos	Team	Pld	W	D	L	GF	GA	GD	Pts	Qualification
1	Zambia	3	3	0	0	5	0	+5	9	Semi-finals
2	Namibia	3	2	0	1	3	2	+1	6	Semi-finals
3	Malawi	3	1	0	2	2	4	−2	3	
4	Comoros	3	0	0	3	0	4	−4	0	

Source: COSAFA.com
4 December 2020
12:30

Malawi	1–0	Comoros
Mologeni 90+4'	Report

Wolfson Stadium, Port Elizabeth
Referee: Mathews Hamalila (Zambia)
4 December 2020
15:30

Zambia	1–0	Namibia
Mashata 62'	Report

Wolfson Stadium, Port Elizabeth
Referee: Lebalang Mokete (Lesotho)

7 December 2020
12:30

Zambia	2–0	Comoros
Chishimba 3'; Bulaya 45+4'	Report

Wolfson Stadium, Port Elizabeth
Referee: Abongile Tom (South Africa)
7 December 2020
15:30

Malawi	1–2	Namibia
Nkhoma 10'	Report	Jantze 14'; Kaninab 45+3'

Wolfson Stadium, Port Elizabeth
Referee: Letticia Viana (Eswatini)

9 December 2020
15:30

Zambia	2–0	Malawi
Mukeya 21', 68'	Report

Wolfson Stadium, Port Elizabeth
Referee: Akhona Makalima (South Africa)
9 December 2020
15:30

Namibia	1–0	Comoros
Damaseb 77'	Report

Gelvandale Stadium, Port Elizabeth
Referee: Letticia Viana (Eswatini)

==== Group C ====
Pos	Team	Pld	W	D	L	GF	GA	GD	Pts	Qualification
1	Angola	2	1	0	1	4	1	+3	3	Semi-finals
2	Eswatini	2	1	0	1	1	1	0	3	
3	Botswana	2	1	0	1	1	4	−3	3	

Source: COSAFA.com
4 December 2020
15:30

Angola	0–1	Eswatini
	Report	Ndlovu 77'

Gelvandale Stadium, Port Elizabeth
Referee: Abongile Tom (South Africa)

6 December 2020
15:30

Botswana	0–4	Angola
	Report	Zini 43' (pen.), 90+2'; Glaudilson 66', 90+4'

Gelvandale Stadium, Port Elizabeth
Referee: Akhona Makalima (South Africa)

8 December 2020
12:30

Botswana	1–0	Eswatini
Molefe 42'	Report

Wolfson Stadium, Port Elizabeth
Referee: Mathews Hamalila (Zambia)

==== Ranking of second-placed teams ====
Due to groups having a different number of teams, the results against the fourth-placed teams in four-team groups were not considered for this ranking.

Pos	Grp	Team	Pld	W	D	L	GF	GA	GD	Pts	Qualification
1	B	Namibia	2	1	0	1	2	2	0	3	Semi-finals
2	C	Eswatini	2	1	0	1	1	1	0	3	
3	A	South Africa	2	0	2	0	2	2	0	2	

Source: COSAFA.com
Rules for classification: Group tiebreakers

=== Knockout stage ===
Semi-finals
11 December – Wolfson Stadium
Angola	0
Namibia	1
11 December – Wolfson Stadium
Mozambique	0 (5)
Zambia	0 (4)

Final
13 December – Nelson Mandela Bay
Namibia	0
Mozambique	1
Third place
13 December – Nelson Mandela Bay
Angola	2
Zambia	1

==== Semi-finals ====
Winners qualified for 2021 Africa U-20 Cup of Nations.

11 December 2020
12:00

Angola	0–1	Namibia
	Report	Damaseb 63'

Wolfson Stadium, Port Elizabeth
Referee: Akhona Makalima (South Africa)
11 December 2020
15:30

Mozambique	0–0	Zambia
	Report
Penalties
Fumo (penalty scored); Novela (penalty scored); Martins (penalty scored); Dlhakama (penalty scored); Augusto (penalty scored)	5–4	(penalty scored) Mafwenta; (penalty missed) Chishimba; (penalty scored) M. Mumba; (penalty scored) Chabala; (penalty scored) P. Mumba

Wolfson Stadium, Port Elizabeth
Referee: Keabetswe Dintwa (Botswana)

==== Third place match ====
13 December 2020
12:00

Angola	2–1	Zambia
Afonso 21'; Zini 37'	Report	M. Mumba 57' (pen.)

Nelson Mandela Bay Stadium, Port Elizabeth
Referee: Letticia Viana (Eswatini)

==== Final ====
13 December 2020
15:00

Namibia	0–1	Mozambique
	Report	Augusto 31'

Nelson Mandela Bay Stadium, Port Elizabeth
Referee: Abongile Tom (South Africa)

== Qualified teams ==
The following 12 teams qualify for the final tournament.

Team	Zone	Qualified on	Previous appearances in Africa U-20 Cup of Nations^{1} only final tournament era (since 1991)
Mauritania (hosts)	West A Zone	28 September 2018	0 (debut)
Gambia	West A Zone	29 November 2020	2 (2007, 2011)
Uganda	Central-East Zone	30 November 2020	0 (debut)
Tanzania	Central-East Zone	30 November 2020	0 (debut)
Namibia	South Zone	11 December 2020	0 (debut)
Mozambique	South Zone	11 December 2020	0 (debut)
Ghana	West B Zone	15 December 2020	11 (1991, **1993**, 1997, **1999**, 2001, 2003, **2009**, 2011, 2013, 2015, 2019)
Burkina Faso	West B Zone	15 December 2020	3 (2003, 2007, 2019)
Central African Republic	Central Zone	17 December 2020	0 (debut)
Cameroon	Central Zone	19 December 2020	9 (1991, 1993, **1995**, 1999, 2001, 2007, 2009, 2011, 2017)
Morocco	North Zone	24 December 2020	4 (1993, **1997**, 2003, 2005)
Tunisia	North Zone	27 December 2020	0 (debut)

^{1} Bold indicates champions for that year. Italic indicates hosts for that year.

== Goalscorers ==
There were 164 goals scored in 66 matches, for an average of 2.48 goals per match.

5 goals

- (Tanzania) Abdul Hamisi Suleiman
- (Uganda) Ivan Bogere

3 goals

- (Angola) Zini
- (Burkina Faso) Kouamé Botué
- (Guinea) Abdourahmane Bah
- (Senegal) Dion Lopy
- (South Africa) Sinenjongo Mkiva
- (Tanzania) Kassim Haruna
- (Tanzania) Kelvin John

2 goals

- (Angola) Glaudilson
- (Benin) Charbel Gomez
- (Burkina Faso) Yves Ouédraogo
- (Cameroon) Jang Sunday
- (Djibouti) Abdourahman Kamil
- (Ethiopia) Beyene Bayse
- (The Gambia) Momodou Bojang
- (The Gambia) Kajally Drammeh
- (Ghana) Percious Boah
- (Guinea) Ibrahima Bérété
- (Ivory Coast) Brahima Ouattara
- (Kenya) Benson Omalla
- (Kenya) Enock Wanyama
- (Mozambique) Simon Cipriano
- (Namibia) Steven Damaseb
- (Senegal) Samba Diallo
- (South Africa) Oswin Appollis
- (South Sudan) Philip Biajo
- (Sudan) Abdelkarim Yousif
- (Togo) Karim Dermane
- (Uganda) Isma Mulugusi
- (Uganda) Kenneth Semakula
- (Zambia) Jimmy Mukeya

1 goal

- (Algeria) Mohamed Belloumi
- (Angola) Benvindo Afonso
- (Botswana) Tefo Molefe
- (Burkina Faso) Ibrahim Bancé
- (Burkina Faso) Hamed Ouattara
- (Burundi) Alfred Nkurunziza
- (Cameroon) John Bosco
- (Cameroon) Saïdou Ibrahim
- (Cameroon) Franck Mbella Etouga
- (Cameroon) Kevin Prince Milla
- (Cameroon) Séverin Onana
- (Central African Republic) Isaac Ngoma
- (Central African Republic) Christian Yawenendji
- (Republic of the Congo) Racine Louamba
- (Republic of the Congo) Sagesse Nzaou
- (Republic of the Congo) Roland Okouri
- (Democratic Republic of the Congo) Linda Mtanga
- (Democratic Republic of the Congo) Patient Mwamba
- (Djibouti) Moktar Djama
- (Equatorial Guinea) Pedro Obiang
- (Eswatini) Majahesibili Ndlovu
- (Ethiopia) Biruk Balcha
- (The Gambia) Adama Kanteh
- (The Gambia) Habibou Mendy
- (Ghana) Daniel Afriyie
- (Guinea) Alsény Soumah
- (Guinea) Mohamed Lamine Soumah
- (Guinea-Bissau) Jamir Sanha
- (Ivory Coast) Evra Dje Bi Broh
- (Ivory Coast) Kouadio N'Guessan
- (Kenya) Nicholas Ochieng
- (Kenya) Ronald Odede
- (Kenya) Fortune Omoto
- (Lesotho) Hlomelang Lebina
- (Libya) Mohamed El Khali
- (Malawi) Yamikani Mologeni
- (Malawi) Lanjesi Nkhoma
- (Mali) Yoro Diaby
- (Mali) Naman Keïta
- (Morocco) El Mehdi Maouhoub
- (Morocco) Oussama Targhalline
- (Mozambique) Dércio Augusto
- (Mozambique) Gabriel Pinho
- (Namibia) Junhino Jantze
- (Namibia) Giovanni Kaninab
- (Niger) Ibrahim Litnine
- (Niger) Abdoul Malik Moustapha
- (Nigeria) Chris Nwaeze
- (Senegal) Mouhamed Bâ
- (Senegal) Libasse Gueye
- (Senegal) Ahmed Mandefu
- (Sierra Leone) Abdul Conteh
- (Sierra Leone) Abu Musa
- (Somalia) Aweys Iman
- (Somalia) Sahal Muhumed
- (South Africa) Rowan Human
- (South Africa) Mohlala Makola
- (South Africa) Tshepo Myeni
- (South Sudan) Khamis Atari
- (South Sudan) Nelson Elia
- (South Sudan) William Kundu
- (Sudan) Al Gozoti Nooh
- (Tanzania) Frank George
- (Tanzania) Khelfin Hamdoun
- (Tanzania) Anuar Jabir
- (Tanzania) Ben Starkie
- (Tanzania) Tepsi Theonasy
- (Tunisia) Adam Ben Lamin
- (Tunisia) Chiheb Labidi
- (Uganda) Richard Basangwa
- (Uganda) Joseph Kizza
- (Uganda) Steven Sserwadda
- (Uganda) Najib Yiga
- (Zambia) Derrick Bulaya
- (Zambia) John Chishimba
- (Zambia) Golden Mashata
- (Zambia) Muma Mumba
- (Zimbabwe) Bill Antonio
- (Zimbabwe) Tapiwa Mandinyenya
- (Zimbabwe) Kelvin Mangiza
- (Zimbabwe) Lexington Mujokoro
- (Zimbabwe) Panashe Mutimbanyoka

1 own goal

- (Algeria) Khalil Bara (against Libya)
- (Burundi) Japhet Ntunzwenimana (against South Sudan)
- (Guinea) Kerfala Camara (against Gambia)
- (Lesotho) Thapelo Mohale (against South Africa)
- (Lesotho) Siyabonga Monyaka (against Zimbabwe)
- (Niger) Massoudi Salifou (against Ivory Coast)
