= 2020 CECAFA U-20 Championship =

Tournament details
- Host country: Tanzania
- City: Arusha
- Dates: 22 November – 2 December 2020
- Teams: 9

Final positions
- Champions: Uganda (4th title)
- Runners-up: Tanzania
- Third place: South Sudan
- Fourth place: Kenya

Tournament statistics
- Matches played: 13
- Goals scored: 54 (4.15 per match)

The 2020 CECAFA U-20 Championship took place from 22 November to 2 December 2020 in Arusha, Tanzania.

This competition served as the CECAFA qualifiers for the 2021 Africa U-20 Cup of Nations. The two finalists of the tournament represented CECAFA in the 2021 Africa U-20 Cup of Nations. It was initially planned to be hosted by Sudan in October–November 2020 but were then later shifted and held in Tanzania between 22 November–2 December 2020.

The matches were played at Karatu (Black Rhino Academy) and Arusha (Sheikh Amri Abeid Memorial Stadium)

All the 11 teams were initially drawn into 3 groups, 2 groups of 4 teams and 1 group of 3 teams but ultimately Rwanda & Eritrea withdrew. The winners of each group and the best runners-up advanced to the semi-finals.

All times are local, EAT (UTC+3).

== Venues ==
- Sheikh Amri Abeid Memorial Stadium, Arusha, Tanzania
- Black Rhino Academy, Karatu, Tanzania

== Teams ==
- Burundi
- Djibouti
- Sudan
- Kenya
- Somalia
- South Sudan
- Tanzania
- Uganda
- Ethiopia
- Rwanda (withdrew)
- Eritrea (withdrew)

== Officials ==
Referees

- Nsoro Ruzindana (Rwanda)
- Saddam Houssein Mansour (Djibouti)
- Israel Mpaima (Kenya)
- Ahmed Hassan Hussein (Somalia)
- Belay Tadesse (Ethiopia)
- Martin Saanya (Tanzania)
- (Ms) Florentina Zabron (Tanzania)
- Mohamed Elsiddig Eltreefe (Sudan)
- William Oloya (Uganda)
- (South Sudan) Ring Nyier Akech Malong (South Sudan)

Assistant Referees

- Joshua Achila (Kenya)
- Nour Abdi Mohamed (Somalia)
- Tigle Gizaw Belachew (Ethiopia)
- Mohamed Salim Mkono (Tanzania)
- Emmanuel Okudra (Uganda)
- (South Sudan) George Primato Olibo (South Sudan)
- (Ms) Fides Bangurambona (Burundi)
- Desire Nkurunziza (Burundi)
- Raymond Nonati Bwiliza (Rwanda)
- Liban Abdirazack Ahmed (Djibouti)
- Omer Hamid Ahmed (Sudan)

== Group stage ==
=== Group A ===
Pos	Team	Pld	W	D	L	GF	GA	GD	Pts	Qualification
1	Tanzania (H)	2	2	0	0	14	2	+12	6	Semi-finals
2	Djibouti	2	1	0	1	3	7	−4	3	
3	Somalia	2	0	0	2	2	10	−8	0	

Updated to match(es) played on unknown. Source: CECAFA
Rules for classification: Group tiebreakers
(H) Hosts
22 November 2020
16:00

Tanzania	6–1	Djibouti
Theonasy 52'; Hamis 65', 72', 90+1' (pen.); Hamdoun 82'; Haruna 88'	Report	Kamil 14'

Black Rhino Academy, Karatu
Referee: Ring Nyier Akech Malong (South Sudan)
24 November 2020
16:00

Djibouti	2–1	Somalia
Kamil 49' (pen.); Djama 87'	Report	Iman 4'

Black Rhino Academy, Karatu
Referee: Nsoro Ruzindana (Rwanda)
26 November 2020
16:00

Somalia	1–8	Tanzania
Muhumed 6'		Suleman 4'; Starkie 15'; John 29', 34', 48'; Haruna 60', 65', 87'

Black Rhino Academy, Karatu
Referee: Mohamed Elsiddig Eltreefe (Sudan)

=== Group B ===
Pos	Team	Pld	W	D	L	GF	GA	GD	Pts	Qualification
1	Uganda	2	1	1	0	6	1	+5	4	Semi-finals
2	South Sudan	2	1	1	0	4	0	+4	4	Semi-finals
3	Burundi	2	0	0	2	1	10	−9	0	

Updated to match(es) played on unknown. Source: CECAFA
Rules for classification: Group tiebreakers
23 November 2020
16:00

South Sudan	0–0	Uganda
	Report

Sheikh Amri Abeid, Arusha
Referee: Saddam Houssein Mansour (Djibouti)
25 November 2020
13:00

Uganda	6–1	Burundi
Bogere 43', 51' (pen.); Yiga 45'; Mulugusi 52', 82'; Kizza 88'	Report	Nkurunziza 90+2'

Sheikh Amri Abeid, Arusha
Referee: Ahmed Hassan Hussein (Somalia)
27 November 2020
16:00

Burundi	0–4	South Sudan

Sheikh Amri Abeid Memorial Stadium, Arusha
Referee: Israel Mpaima (Kenya)

=== Group C ===
Pos	Team	Pld	W	D	L	GF	GA	GD	Pts	Qualification
1	Kenya	2	2	0	0	5	1	+4	6	Advance to Semi-finals
2	Ethiopia	2	1	0	1	3	5	−2	3	
3	Sudan	2	0	0	2	3	5	−2	0	

Source: CECAFA
Rules for classification: Group stage tiebreakers
23 November 2020
13:00

Ethiopia	0–3	Kenya
	Report	Omalla 38'; Odede 46'; Wanyama 85'

Sheikh Amri Abeid, Arusha
Referee: Martin Saanya (Tanzania)
25 November 2020
16:00

Sudan	2–3	Ethiopia
Yousif 32', 45'	Report	Bayse 58', 79'; Balcha 72'

Sheikh Amri Abeid, Arusha
Referee: (Ms) Florentina Zabron (Tanzania)
27 November 2020
13:00

Kenya	2–1	Sudan
Omotto 56'; Omalla 90+2'		Nooh 84'

Sheikh Amri Abeid, Arusha
Referee: William Oloya (Uganda)

== Knockout stage ==
=== Semi-finals ===
Winners qualified for 2021 Africa U-20 Cup of Nations.

30 November 2020
12h00

Uganda	3–1	Kenya
Semakula 22'; Bogere 26', 64' (pen.)	Report	Bobosi 81'

Black Rhino Academy, Karatu
Referee: Belay Tadesse (Ethiopia)
30 November 2020
15h30

Tanzania	1–0	South Sudan
Haruna 55'	Report

Black Rhino Academy, Karatu
Referee: Nsoro Ruzindana (Rwanda)

=== 3rd Place match ===
2 December 2020
12h00

Kenya	1–2	South Sudan
Ochieng 12'	Report	Biajo 3'; Victor 41'

Black Rhino Academy, Karatu
Referee: Martin Saanya (Tanzania)

=== Finals ===
2 December 2020
15h30

Uganda	4–1	Tanzania
Basangwa 12'; Sserwadda 45'; Bogere 61'; Semakula 72'	Report	Suleiman 30' (pen.)

Black Rhino Academy, Karatu
Referee: Mohamed Elsiddig Eltreefe (Sudan)

== Champion ==
2020 CECAFA U-20 Championship champion

Uganda
Fourth title

== Qualification for CAF U20 Cup of Nations ==
The two finalists of the tournament qualified for the 2021 Africa U-20 Cup of Nations.

Qualified nations:

- Uganda
- Tanzania
