= 2022 Kirin Cup Soccer =

キリンカップサッカー2022

Tournament details
- Host country: Japan
- Dates: 10–14 June
- Teams: 4 (from 3 confederations)
- Venues: 2 (in 2 host cities)

Final positions
- Champions: Tunisia (1st title)
- Runners-up: Japan
- Third place: Ghana
- Fourth place: Chile

Tournament statistics
- Matches played: 4
- Goals scored: 10 (2.5 per match)
- Attendance: 67,550 (16,888 per match)
- Top scorer: (Tunisia) Issam Jebali (2 goals)
- Best player: (Tunisia) Ferjani Sassi

The 2022 Kirin Cup Soccer was the 32nd edition of the international friendly football tournament Kirin Cup Soccer organised by the Japan Football Association (JFA), which was played in Japan between 10 and 14 June 2022, with the participation of four teams: Chile, Japan, Ghana and Tunisia. This is the first Kirin Cup Soccer tournament in six years, since 2016.

Tunisia have won their first title after defeating host nation Japan 3–0 in the final. Ferjani Sassi was named the best player of the tournament, while his compatriot Issam Jebali finished as the top scorer with two goals.

== Teams ==
The friendly tournament featured a total of four national teams for the 2022 edition.

Country	Confederation	Manager	Appearance	Previous best performance	FIFA ranking at start of event
Japan (hosts)	AFC	(Japan) Hajime Moriyasu	32nd	Champions (Eleven times) (Note: Japan won in 1991, 1995, 1996, 1997, 2000, 2001, 2004, 2007, 2008, 2009 and 2011.)	23
Chile	CONMEBOL	(Argentina) Eduardo Berizzo	2nd	Runners-up (2009)	28
Ghana	CAF	(Ghana) Otto Addo	1st	Debut	60
Tunisia	CAF	(Tunisia) Jalel Kadri	1st	Debut	35

== Venues ==
Location of areas hosting the 2022 Kirin Cup Soccer
1 Osaka
2 Kobe

The two stadiums selected for the tournament are: Noevir Stadium Kobe in Kobe, to host the semi-final matches on 10 June, and Panasonic Stadium Suita in Osaka for the third-place classification match and the final on 14 June.

Osaka	Kobe
Panasonic Stadium Suita	Noevir Stadium Kobe
34°48′09″N 135°32′18″E	34°39′24″N 135°10′08″E
Capacity: 39,694	Capacity: 30,132

== Match officials ==
A total of 4 referees, 6 assistants and 7 video assistant referees (VAR) were named for the tournament.

=== Referees ===
- (Japan) Ryo Tanimoto
- (Australia) Kurt Ams
- (Japan) Hiroki Kasahara
- (United Arab Emirates) Ahmed Eisa Darwish

=== Assistant referees ===
- (Japan) Yusuke Hamamoto
- (Japan) Kota Watanabe
- (Japan) Andrew Lindsay
- (United Arab Emirates) Jasem Abdulla Al Ali
- (Japan) Hiroyuki Kimura
- (Japan) Ryuji Sato

=== Video assistant referees ===
- (Japan) Hiroki Kasahara
- (United Arab Emirates) Ahmed Eisa Mohamed
- (Japan) Ryo Tanimoto
- (Japan) Mihara Jun
- (Japan) Yamauchi Hiroshi
- (Japan) Asaka Koizumi
- (Japan) Hiroshi Yamauchi

== Results ==
All times are local, Japan Standard Time (UTC+9).

=== Bracket ===
Semi-finals
10 June – Kobe
Japan	4
Ghana	1
10 June – Kobe
Chile	0
Tunisia	2

Final
14 June – Osaka
Japan	0
Tunisia	3
3rd place match
14 June – Osaka
Chile	0 (1)
Ghana (p)	0 (3)

=== Semi-finals ===
10 June 2022
15:15

Chile	0–2	Tunisia
	Report (JFA); Report (JFA)	Abdi 41'; Jebali 89'

Noevir Stadium Kobe, Kobe
Attendance: 4,973
Referee: Ryo Tanimoto (Japan)

Chile	Tunisia

GK	12	Zacarías López
DF	17	Gary Medel (c)		(substituted off) 59'
DF	2	Eugenio Mena
DF	5	Paulo Díaz
DF	15	Francisco Sierralta
DF	26	Jeyson Rojas	(yellow card) 58'	(substituted off) 83'
MF	14	Pablo Galdames
MF	13	Felipe Méndez
FW	11	Ronnie Fernández	(yellow card) 45+1'
FW	7	Joaquín Montecinos		(substituted off) 70'
FW	22	Ben Brereton Díaz		(substituted off) 59'
Substitutions:
DF	6	Nayel Mehssatou		(substituted on) 83'
MF	21	Tomás Alarcón		(substituted on) 59'
MF	19	Darío Osorio		(substituted on) 83'
FW	9	Jean Meneses		(substituted on) 59' (substituted off) 70'
FW	16	Diego Valencia		(substituted on) 70'
Coach:
(Argentina) Eduardo Berizzo

GK	16	Aymen Dahmen
DF	4	Ali Abdi		(substituted off) 90+3'
DF	20	Mohamed Dräger	(yellow card) 43'
DF	3	Montassar Talbi
DF	6	Nader Ghandri
MF	13	Ferjani Sassi (c)
MF	14	Aïssa Laïdouni
MF	15	Mohamed Ali Ben Romdhane		(substituted off) 68'
MF	25	Anis Ben Slimane		(substituted off) 90+4'
FW	23	Naïm Sliti		(substituted off) 79'
FW	19	Seifeddine Jaziri		(substituted off) 68'
Substitutions:
DF	2	Bilel Ifa		(substituted on) 90+3'
DF	21	Rami Kaib		(substituted on) 90+4'
MF	10	Hannibal Mejbri		(substituted on) 79'
FW	17	Issam Jebali		(substituted on) 68'
FW	7	Youssef Msakni		(substituted on) 68'
Coach:
Jalel Kadri

Assistant referees:
Yusuke Hamamoto (Japan)
Kota Watanabe (Japan)
Fourth official:
Hiroyuki Kimura (Japan)
Video assistant referee:
Hiroki Kasahara (Japan)
Assistant video assistant referees:
Mihara Jun (Japan)

10 June 2022
18:55

Japan	4–1	Ghana
Yamane 29'; Mitoma 45+1'; Kubo 73'; Maeda 82'	Report (JFA); Report (JFA)	J. Ayew 43'

Noevir Stadium Kobe, Kobe
Attendance: 25,100
Referee: Kurt Ams (Australia)

Japan	Ghana

GK	1	Eiji Kawashima
DF	22	Maya Yoshida (c)		(substituted off) 46'
DF	3	Shogo Taniguchi
DF	2	Miki Yamane		(substituted off) 85'
DF	26	Hiroki Ito	(yellow card) 40'
MF	7	Gaku Shibasaki
MF	6	Wataru Endo		(substituted off) 69'
MF	11	Takefusa Kubo
MF	21	Ritsu Dōan		(substituted off) 69'
MF	15	Kaoru Mitoma		(substituted off) 80'
FW	25	Ayase Ueda		(substituted off) 80'
Substitutions:
DF	4	Ko Itakura		(substituted on) 46'
DF	20	Yūta Nakayama		(substituted on) 85'
MF	17	Ao Tanaka		(substituted on) 69'
MF	14	Junya Ito		(substituted on) 69'
MF	10	Takumi Minamino		(substituted on) 80'
FW	24	Daizen Maeda		(substituted on) 80'
Coach:
Hajime Moriyasu

GK	12	Lawrence Ati-Zigi
DF	2	Andy Yiadom		(substituted off) 82'
DF	18	Daniel Amartey
DF	5	Dennis Nkrumah-Korsah		(substituted off) 68'
DF	3	Alidu Seidu
MF	11	Mubarak Wakaso
MF	20	Mohammed Kudus		(substituted off) 68'
MF	6	Edmund Addo
FW	10	André Ayew (c)
FW	9	Jordan Ayew		(substituted off) 81'
FW	15	Christopher Antwi-Adjei
Substitutions:
MF	7	Abdul Fatawu Issahaku	(yellow card) 84'	(substituted on) 68'
FW	13	Felix Afena-Gyan		(substituted on) 68'
FW	19	Benjamin Tetteh		(substituted on) 81'
FW	14	Daniel Afriyie	(yellow card) 90'	(substituted on) 82'
Coach:
Otto Addo

Assistant referees:
Andrew Lindsay (Australia)
Jasem Abdulla Al Ali (United Arab Emirates)
Fourth official:
Ryuji Sato (Japan)
Video assistant referee:
Ahmed Eisa Mohamed (United Arab Emirates)
Assistant video assistant referees:
Yamauchi Hiroshi (Japan)

=== Third place match ===
14 June 2022
15:15

Chile	0–0	Ghana
	Report (JFA); Report (JFA)
Penalties
Fernández (penalty scored); Alarcón (penalty missed); Brereton (penalty missed); Medel (penalty missed)	1–3	(penalty scored) J. Ayew; (penalty scored) Kudus; (penalty scored) Issahaku

Panasonic Stadium Suita, Osaka
Attendance: 6,185
Referee: Hiroki Kasahara (Japan)

Chile	Ghana

GK	1	Sebastián Pérez
DF	18	Óscar Opazo	(yellow card) 31'	(substituted off) 73'
DF	5	Paulo Díaz (c)
DF	3	Benjamín Kuscevic
DF	15	Francisco Sierralta	(yellow card) 46'	(substituted off) 81'
DF	25	Alex Ibacache		(substituted off) 81'
DF	6	Nayel Mehssatou
MF	14	Pablo Galdames	(yellow card) 59'	(substituted off) 81'
MF	21	Tomás Alarcón
FW	22	Ben Brereton Díaz
FW	16	Diego Valencia
Substitutions:
DF	17	Gary Medel		(substituted on) 73'
DF	2	Eugenio Mena		(substituted on) 81'
MF	19	Darío Osorio		(substituted on) 81'
FW	11	Ronnie Fernández		(substituted on) 81'
Coach:
(Argentina) Eduardo Berizzo

GK	1	Abdul Manaf Nurudeen
DF	17	Baba Rahman
DF	18	Daniel Amartey
DF	3	Alidu Seidu	(red card) 67'
MF	11	Mubarak Wakaso	(yellow card) 21' (yellow-red card) 78'
MF	20	Mohammed Kudus
MF	6	Edmund Addo		(substituted off) 63'
MF	7	Abdul Fatawu Issahaku
FW	10	André Ayew (c)	(yellow card) 79'
FW	19	Benjamin Tetteh	(yellow card) 40'	(substituted off) 80'
FW	13	Felix Afena-Gyan		(substituted off) 63'
Substitutions:
DF	2	Andy Yiadom		(substituted on) 63' (substituted off) 90+3'
DF	22	Dennis Nkrumah-Korsah		(substituted on) 90+3'
FW	9	Jordan Ayew		(substituted on) 63'
FW	15	Christopher Antwi-Adjei		(substituted on) 80'
Coach:
Otto Addo

Assistant referees:
Kota Watanabe (Japan)
Yusuke Hamamoto (Japan)
Fourth official:
Ryuji Sato (Japan)
Video assistant referee:
Ryo Tanimoto (Japan)
Assistant video assistant referees:
Asaka Koizumi (Japan)

=== Final ===
14 June 2022
18:55

Japan	0−3	Tunisia
	Report (JFA); Report (JFA)	Ben Romdhane 55' (pen.); Sassi 76'; Jebali 90+3'

Panasonic Stadium Suita, Osaka
Attendance: 31,292
Referee: Ahmed Eisa Darwish (United Arab Emirates)

Japan	Tunisia

GK	23	Daniel Schmidt
DF	22	Maya Yoshida (c)
DF	5	Yuto Nagatomo	(yellow card) 52'	(substituted off) 82'
DF	4	Ko Itakura
DF	26	Hiroki Ito
MF	8	Genki Haraguchi		(substituted off) 46'
MF	9	Daichi Kamada		(substituted off) 60'
MF	6	Wataru Endo
MF	10	Takumi Minamino		(substituted off) 71'
MF	14	Junya Ito		(substituted off) 71'
FW	18	Takuma Asano		(substituted off) 60'
Substitutions:
DF	2	Miki Yamane		(substituted on) 82'
MF	17	Ao Tanaka		(substituted on) 46'
MF	15	Kaoru Mitoma		(substituted on) 60'
MF	11	Takefusa Kubo		(substituted on) 71'
MF	21	Ritsu Dōan		(substituted on) 71'
FW	19	Kyogo Furuhashi		(substituted on) 60'
Coach:
Hajime Moriyasu

GK	16	Aymen Dahmen
DF	2	Bilel Ifa	(yellow card) 78'
DF	4	Ali Abdi	(yellow card) 33'
DF	20	Mohamed Dräger		(substituted off) 90+4'
DF	3	Montassar Talbi
MF	13	Ferjani Sassi
MF	14	Aïssa Laïdouni
MF	15	Mohamed Ali Ben Romdhane		(substituted off) 77'
MF	25	Anis Ben Slimane		(substituted off) 90+4'
FW	7	Youssef Msakni (c)		(substituted off) 85'
FW	11	Taha Yassine Khenissi		(substituted off) 77'
Substitutions:
DF	21	Rami Kaib		(substituted on) 85'
DF	5	Adam Ben Lamin		(substituted on) 90+4'
MF	10	Hannibal Mejbri		(substituted on) 77'
MF	18	Firas Ben Larbi		(substituted on) 90+4'
FW	17	Issam Jebali		(substituted on) 77'
Coach:
Jalel Kadri

Assistant referees:
Jasem Abdulla Al Ali (United Arab Emirates)
Andrew Lindsay (Australia)
Fourth official:
Hiroyuki Kimura (Japan)
Video assistant referee:
Kurt Ams (Australia)
Assistant video assistant referees:
Hiroshi Yamauchi (Japan)

Match rules

- 90 minutes.
- Penalty shoot-out if scores still level.
- Maximum of five substitutions, with a sixth allowed in extra time.

== Statistics ==
=== Goalscorers ===
There were 10 goals scored in 4 matches, for an average of 2.5 goals per match.

2 goals

- (Tunisia) Issam Jebali

1 goal

- (Ghana) Jordan Ayew
- (Japan) Takefusa Kubo
- (Japan) Daizen Maeda
- (Japan) Kaoru Mitoma
- (Japan) Miki Yamane
- (Tunisia) Ali Abdi
- (Tunisia) Mohamed Ali Ben Romdhane
- (Tunisia) Ferjani Sassi

=== Awards ===
- Best player: (Tunisia) Ferjani Sassi
- Top scorer: (Tunisia) Issam Jebali

=== Final standings ===
Per statistical convention in football, matches decided in extra time are counted as wins and losses, while matches decided by a penalty shoot-out are counted as draws.

Pos.	Team	Pld	W	D	L	Pts	GF	GA	GD
1	Tunisia	2	2	0	0	6	5	0	+5
2	Japan	2	1	0	1	3	4	4	0
3	Ghana	2	0	1	1	1	1	4	−3
4	Chile	2	0	1	1	1	0	2	−2

== See also ==
- Kirin Challenge Cup (an international friendly match)
- Kirin Company (supporting company)
- Japan Football Association (JFA)
