= 2021 U-20 Africa Cup of Nations =

16th edition of youth football tournament

كأس أمم إفريقيا تحت 20 سنة 2021 Coupe d'Afrique des Nations des U-20 2021

Tournament details
- Host country: Mauritania
- Dates: 14 February – 6 March
- Teams: 12 (from 1 confederation)
- Venues: 3 (in 2 host cities)

Final positions
- Champions: Ghana (4th title)
- Runners-up: Uganda
- Third place: Gambia
- Fourth place: Tunisia

Tournament statistics
- Matches played: 26
- Goals scored: 52 (2 per match)
- Top scorer(s): (Uganda) Derrick Kakooza (5 goals)
- Best player: (Ghana) Abdul Fatawu
- Fair play award: Uganda

The 2021 U-20 Africa Cup of Nations was the 16th edition (23rd edition if editions of the tournament without hosts are included), the biennial international youth football tournament organized by the Confederation of African Football (CAF) for players aged 20 and below. In September 2018, it was decided that the tournament would be hosted by Mauritania. This would be the first edition of the Africa U-20 Cup of Nations to be expanded to 12000p teams instead of eight. The top four teams of the tournament would have normally qualified for the 2021 FIFA U-20 World Cup in Indonesia as the CAF representatives. However, FIFA decided to cancel the tournament on 24 December 2020 due to the COVID-19 pandemic.

The defending champions Mali failed to qualify. Ghana won their fourth title by defeating debutant Uganda in the final.

== Qualification ==
At the end of the qualification phase, eleven teams will join the hosts Mauritania.

=== Player eligibility ===
Players born 1 January 2001 or later are eligible to participate in the competition.

=== Qualified teams ===
The following 12 teams qualified for the group stages.

Note: All appearance statistics count only those since the introduction of the competition in 1991.

Team	Zone	Appearance	Previous best performance
Mauritania (hosts)	West A Zone	1st	Debut
Morocco	North Zone	5th	Champions (1997)
Tunisia	North Zone	1st	Debut
Gambia	West A Zone	3rd	Third place (2007)
Ghana	West B Zone	12th	Champions (1993, 1999, 2009)
Burkina Faso	West B Zone	4th	Fourth place (2003)
Uganda	Central-East Zone	1st	Debut
Tanzania	Central-East Zone	1st	Debut
Central African Republic	Central Zone	1st	Debut
Cameroon	Central Zone	10th	Champions (1995)
Namibia	South Zone	1st	Debut
Mozambique	South Zone	1st	Debut

== Venues ==
Nouakchott
Stade Olympique	Stade Cheikha Ould Boïdiya
Capacity: 20,000	Capacity: 8,200
Nouadhibou	2021 U-20 Africa Cup of Nations is located in Mauritania
Stade Municipal de Nouadhibou	2021 U-20 Africa Cup of Nations is located in Mauritania
Capacity: 10,300	2021 U-20 Africa Cup of Nations is located in Mauritania

== Draw ==
The group stage draw was held on 25 January 2021, 11:00 AM WAT (UTC+1), at the Hilton Hotel in Cameroon. The twelve teams were drawn into three groups of four teams. The hosts, Mauritania, were seeded in Group A and allocated to position A1, with Ghana and Burkina Faso, the only teams among the 12 who participated in the last edition of the CAN Total U20, drawn into B1 & C1 positions. All the other teams were in the same level and were distributed over the three groups.

Hosts	Pot 1	Pot 2
Mauritania (A1)	Ghana; Burkina Faso	Cameroon; Tunisia; Morocco; Gambia; Central African Republic; Mozambique; Namibia; Uganda; Tanzania

== Match officials ==
A total of 16 referees and 18 assistant referees were appointed for the tournament.

Referees

- Abdelaziz Bouh (Mauritania)
- (Burkina Faso) Jean Ouattara (Burkina Faso)
- Blaise Yuven Ngwa (Cameroon)
- Samuel Uwikunda (Rwanda)
- (Ivory Coast) Ibrahim Kalilou Traoré (Ivory Coast)
- (Republic of the Congo) Messie Jessie Nkounkou Mvoutou (Congo)
- Celso Alvacao (Mozambique)
- Mutaz Ibrahim (Libya)
- Pierre Atcho (Gabon)
- Mahmood Ali Mahmood Ismail (Sudan)
- Mohamed Ali Moussa (Niger)
- Souleiman Ahmed Djama (Djibouti)
- Adalbert Diouf (Senegal)
- Mahamat Alhadji Allaou (Chad)
- (South Africa) Akhona Makalima (South Africa)
- Mehrez Melki (Tunisia)

Assistant Referees

- Hamedine Diba (Mauritania)
- Meriem Chedad (Mauritania)
- Samuel Kuria (Kenya)
- Abbes Akram Zerhouni (Algeria)
- (Sierra Leone) Michael Conteh (Sierra Leone)
- Modibo Samake (Mali)
- Tigle Gizaw Belachew (Ethiopia)
- Thomas Kusosa (Zimbabwe)
- Rodrigue Menye Mpele (Cameroon)
- (Central African Republic) Jospin Luckner Malonga (Central African Republic)
- Abdoulaye Sylla (Guinea)
- Clemence Kanduku (Malawi)
- Kwasi Brobbey (Ghana)
- Frank John Komba (Tanzania)
- Aymen Ismail (Tunisia)
- Eric Ayimavo (Benin)
- Youssef Wahid Elbosaty (Egypt)
- Adia Cisse (Senegal)

== Group stage ==
The top two teams of each group advance to the quarter finals along with the two best 3rd placed teams.

Tiebreakers

Teams are ranked according to points (3 points for a win, 1 point for a draw, 0 points for a loss), and if tied on points, the following tiebreaking criteria are applied, in the order given, to determine the rankings (Regulations Article 71):

1. Points in head-to-head matches among tied teams;
2. Goal difference in head-to-head matches among tied teams;
3. Goals scored in head-to-head matches among tied teams;
4. If more than two teams are tied, and after applying all head-to-head criteria above, a subset of teams are still tied, all head-to-head criteria above are reapplied exclusively to this subset of teams;
5. Goal difference in all group matches;
6. Goals scored in all group matches;
7. Drawing of lots.

All times are in WAT (UTC+1).

=== Group A ===
Pos	Team	Pld	W	D	L	GF	GA	GD	Pts
1	Cameroon	3	3	0	0	6	1	+5	9
2	Uganda	3	2	0	1	4	2	+2	6
3	Mauritania (H)	3	1	0	2	3	3	0	3
4	Mozambique	3	0	0	3	1	8	−7	0

Rules for classification: Group stage tiebreakers
(H) Hosts
14 February 2021
21:00

Mauritania	0–1	Cameroon
	Report	Jang Junior 81'

Stade Olympique (Nouakchott)
Referee: Mutaz Ibrahim Al-Shalmani (Libya)
15 February 2021
14:00

Uganda	2–0	Mozambique
Kakooza 57' (pen.); Sserwadda 86'	Report

Stade Olympique (Nouakchott)
Referee: Mohamed Ali Moussa (Niger)

17 February 2021
17:00

Cameroon	1–0	Uganda
Jang Junior 32'	Report

Stade Olympique (Nouakchott)
Referee: Souleiman Ahmed Djama (Djibouti)
17 February 2021
20:00

Mauritania	2–0	Mozambique
M'Bareck 19'; Sanghare 45'	Report

Stade Olympique (Nouakchott)
Referee: Mahamat Alhadji Allaou (Chad)

20 February 2021
19:00

Mozambique	1–4	Cameroon
Lorenzoni 85'	Report	Eto'o 8', 45'; Milla 47'; Yahaya 87'

Stade Cheikha Ould Boïdiya, Nouakchott
Referee: Akhona Makalima (South Africa)
20 February 2021
19:00

Mauritania	1–2	Uganda
Sanghare 37' (pen.)	Report	Sserwadda 60'; Kakooza 87' (pen.)

Stade Olympique (Nouakchott)
Referee: Ibrahim Kalilou Traoré (Ivory Coast)

=== Group B ===
Pos	Team	Pld	W	D	L	GF	GA	GD	Pts
1	Burkina Faso	3	2	1	0	4	1	+3	7
2	Central African Republic	3	1	1	1	4	5	−1	4 (Note: Ranked on head-to-head points: Central African Republic 3pts, Tunisia 0pts.)
3	Tunisia	3	1	1	1	3	2	+1	4
4	Namibia	3	0	1	2	1	4	−3	1

Rules for classification: Group stage tiebreakers
Notes:
15 February 2021
17:00

Burkina Faso	0–0	Tunisia
	Report

Stade Cheikha Ould Boïdiya, Nouakchott
Referee: Samuel Uwikunda (Rwanda)
15 February 2021
20:00

Namibia	1–1	Central African Republic
Kandjii 81'	Report	Yangao 53'

Stade Cheikha Ould Boïdiya, Nouakchott
Referee: Blaise Yuven Ngwa (Cameroon)

18 February 2021
17:00

Tunisia	2–0	Namibia
Lamti 28'; Ayari 48'	Report

Stade Cheikha Ould Boïdiya, Nouakchott
Referee: Adalbert Diouf (Senegal)
18 February 2021
20:00

Burkina Faso	3–1	Central African Republic
Bazie 45+2'; Chardey 55'; Beleme 63'	Report	Ngoma 32'

Stade Cheikha Ould Boïdiya, Nouakchott
Referee: Celso Alvacao (Mozambique)

21 February 2021
19:00

Burkina Faso	1–0	Namibia
Botué 90'	Report

Stade Cheikha Ould Boïdiya, Nouakchott
Referee: Mohamed Ali Moussa (Niger)
21 February 2021
19:00

Tunisia	1–2	Central African Republic
Labidi 24' (pen.)	Report	Gombe-Fei 5'; Yapende 6'

Stade Olympique (Nouakchott)
Referee: Messie Jessie Nkounkou Mvoutou (Congo)

=== Group C ===
Pos	Team	Pld	W	D	L	GF	GA	GD	Pts
1	Morocco	3	2	1	0	4	0	+4	7
2	Gambia	3	1	1	1	3	3	0	4 (Note: Ranked on head-to-head points: Gambia 3pts, Ghana 0pts.)
3	Ghana	3	1	1	1	5	2	+3	4
4	Tanzania	3	0	1	2	1	8	−7	1

Rules for classification: Group stage tiebreakers
Notes:
16 February 2021
17:00

Ghana	4–0	Tanzania
Boah 3', 71'; Issahaku 30'; Barnes 89'	Report

Stade Municipal de Nouadhibou
Referee: Mehrez Melki (Tunisia)
16 February 2021
20:00

Gambia	0–1	Morocco
	Report	Moubarik 23' (pen.)

Stade Municipal de Nouadhibou
Referee: Mahmood Ali Mahmood Ismail (Sudan)

19 February 2021
17:00

Tanzania	1–1	Gambia
Dismas 88'	Report	Bojang 40'

Stade Municipal de Nouadhibou
19 February 2021
20:00

Morocco	0–0	Ghana
	Report

Stade Municipal de Nouadhibou
Referee: Abdelaziz Bouh (Mauritania)

22 February 2021
20:00

Ghana	1–2	Gambia
Issahaku 9'	Report	Drammeh 16'; Jallow 33'

Stade Municipal de Nouadhibou
Referee: Jean Ouattara (Burkina Faso)
22 February 2021
20:00

Tanzania	0–3	Morocco
	Report	Moubarik 4' (pen.); Essahel 10'; Mouloua 13'

Stade Cheikha Ould Boïdiya
Referee: Samuel Uwikunda (Rwanda)

== Ranking of third-placed teams ==
Pos	Grp	Team	Pld	W	D	L	GF	GA	GD	Pts
1	C	Ghana	3	1	1	1	5	2	+3	4
2	B	Tunisia	3	1	1	1	3	2	+1	4
3	A	Mauritania	3	1	0	2	3	3	0	3

== Knockout stage ==
Quarter-finals
25 February 2021 – Stade Olympique
Cameroon	1 (2)
Ghana (pen.)	1 (4)
26 February 2021 – Stade Olympique
Central African Republic	0
Gambia	3
25 February 2021 – Cheikha Ould Boïdiya
Burkina Faso	0 (3)
Uganda (pen.)	0 (5)
26 February 2021 – Stade Municipal
Morocco	0 (1)
Tunisia (pen.)	0 (4)

Semi-finals
1 March 2021 – Stade Olympique
Ghana	1
Gambia	0
1 March 2021 – Stade Olympique
Uganda	4
Tunisia	1

Final
6 March 2021 – Cheikha Ould Boïdiya
Ghana	2
Uganda	0
Third place
5 March 2021 – Stade Olympique
Gambia (pen.)	0 (4)
Tunisia	0 (2)

=== Quarter finals ===
25 February 2021
17:00

Cameroon	1–1 (a.e.t.)	Ghana
Milla 103'	Report	Boateng 105+2'
Penalties
Alioum (penalty scored); Ibrahim (penalty scored); Ali (penalty missed); Milla (penalty missed)	2–4	(penalty scored) Afriyie; (penalty scored) Assinki; (penalty scored) Mensah; (penalty scored) Boah

Stade Olympique (Nouakchott)
Referee: Mahamat Alhadji Allaou (Chad)

25 February 2021
20:00

Burkina Faso	0–0 (a.e.t.)	Uganda
	Report
Penalties
Djiga (penalty missed); Chardey (penalty scored); Diané (penalty scored); Bamba (penalty scored)	3–5	(penalty scored) Kakooza; (penalty scored) Bukenya; (penalty scored) Najib YigaYiga; (penalty scored) Bogere; (penalty scored) Semakula

Stade Cheikha Ould Boïdiya, Nouakchott
Referee: Blaise Yuven Ngwa (Cameroon)

26 February 2021
17:00

Morocco	0–0 (a.e.t.)	Tunisia
	Report
Penalties
Maouhoub (penalty scored); Moubarik (penalty missed); Zemraoui (penalty missed)	1–4	(penalty scored) Ben Lamin; (penalty scored) Lamti; (penalty scored) Mimouni; (penalty scored) Labidi

Stade Municipal de Nouadhibou
Referee: Mutaz Ibrahim Al-Shalmani (Libya)

26 February 2021
20:00

Central African Republic	0–3	Gambia
	Report	Fofana 5'; Bojang 49'; Barry 90+2'

Stade Olympique (Nouakchott)
Referee: Abdelaziz Bouh (Mauritania)

=== Semi finals ===
1 March 2021
17:00

Ghana	1–0	Gambia
Boah 34'	Report

Stade Olympique (Nouakchott)
Referee: Souleiman Ahmed Djama (Djibouti)

1 March 2021
20:30

Uganda	4–1	Tunisia
Basangwa 4'; Kakooza 37', 50', 73'	Report	Ben Lamin 39'

Stade Olympique (Nouakchott)
Referee: Pierre Atcho (Gabon)

=== Third place ===
5 March 2021
21:00

Gambia	0–0 (a.e.t.)	Tunisia
	Report
Penalties
Bojang (penalty scored); Njie (penalty missed); Alieu Barry (penalty scored); Salieu Jallow (penalty scored); Kanteh (penalty scored)	4–2	(penalty missed) Ben Lamin; (penalty scored) Ayari; (penalty missed) Labidi; (penalty scored) Ben Zghada

Stade Cheikha Ould Boïdiya
Referee: Celso Alvacao (Mozambique)

=== Final ===
6 March 2021
21:00

Ghana	2–0	Uganda
Afriyie 22', 51'	Report

Stade Olympique (Nouakchott)
Referee: Abdelaziz Bouh (Mauritania)

== Winners ==
2021 Africa U-20 Cup of Nations

Ghana
Fourth title

== Awards ==
The following awards were given at the conclusion of the tournament:

Player of the Tournament
(Ghana) Abdul Fatawu Issahaku
Top Scorer
(Uganda) Derrick Kakooza

(5 goals)

Best Goalkeeper
(Ghana) Ibrahim Danlad
Best Coach
Morley Byekwaso (Uganda)
CAF Fair Play Team
Uganda

=== Team of the Tournament ===
Coach: (Uganda) Morley Byekwaso

Goalkeeper	Defenders	Midfielders	Forwards
(Ghana) Ibrahim Danlad	(Central African Republic) Flory Yangao (Cameroon) Blondon Meyapya (The Gambia) Lamin Jawara (Uganda) Aziz Kayondo	(Morocco) El Mehdi Moubarik (The Gambia) Lamarana Jallow (Tunisia) Chiheb Labidi	(Ghana) Abdul Fatawu (Uganda) Derrick Kakooza (Burkina Faso) Joffrey Bazié

== Goalscorers ==
There have been 52 goals scored in 26 matches, for an average of 2 goals per match (as of 1 March 2021).

5 goals

- (Uganda) Derrick Kakooza

3 goals

- (Ghana) Percious Boah

2 goals

- (Cameroon) Etienne Eto'o
- (Cameroon) Kevin Prince Milla
- (Cameroon) Junior Sunday Jang
- (The Gambia) Modou Bojang
- (Ghana) Abdul Fatawu
- (Ghana) Daniel Afriyie
- (Mauritania) Silly Sanghare
- (Morocco) El Mehdi Moubarik
- (Uganda) Steven Sserwadda

1 goal

- (Burkina Faso) Joffrey Bazié
- (Burkina Faso) Pingwinde Beleme
- (Burkina Faso) Kouamé Botué
- (Burkina Faso) Éric Chardey
- (Cameroon) Abdoulaye Yahaya
- (Central African Republic) Alfred Gombe-Fei
- (Central African Republic) Isaac Ngoma
- (Central African Republic) Marc Raphael Yapende
- (Central African Republic) Flory Yangao
- (The Gambia) Alieu Barry
- (The Gambia) Kajally Drammeh
- (The Gambia) Wally Fofana
- (The Gambia) Lamarana Jallow
- (Ghana) Joselpho Barnes
- (Ghana) Frank Boateng
- (Mauritania) Oumar M'Bareck
- (Morocco) Mohamed Amine Essahel
- (Morocco) Ayoub Mouloua
- (Mozambique) Gianluca Lorenzoni
- (Namibia) Penouua Amazing Kandjii
- (Tanzania) Novatus Dismas
- (Tunisia) Hassan Ayari
- (Tunisia) Adam Ben Lamin
- (Tunisia) Chiheb Labidi
- (Tunisia) Marc Lamti
- (Uganda) Richard Basangwa

== Final standings ==
Per statistical convention in football, matches decided in extra time are counted as wins and losses, while matches decided by a penalty shoot-out are counted as draws.

Pos.	Team	Pld	W	D	L	Pts	GF	GA	GD
1	Ghana	6	3	2	1	11	9	3	+6
2	Uganda	6	3	1	2	10	8	5	+3
3	Gambia	6	2	2	2	8	6	4	+2
4	Tunisia	6	1	3	2	6	4	6	−2
Eliminated in the quarter-finals
5	Cameroon	4	3	0	1	9	7	2	+5
6	Morocco	4	2	2	0	8	4	0	+4
7	Burkina Faso	4	2	2	0	8	4	1	+3
8	Central African Republic	4	1	1	2	4	4	8	−4
Eliminated in group stage
9	Mauritania	3	1	0	2	3	3	3	0
10	Namibia	3	0	1	2	1	1	4	−3
11	Mozambique	3	0	1	2	1	1	8	−7
12	Tanzania	3	0	1	2	1	1	8	−7
