= Alhassan Siisu =

Ghanaian footballer

Personal information
- Full name: Alhassan Siisu
- Date of birth: 5 October 1998 (age 28)
- Place of birth: Tamale, Ghana
- Height: 1.83 m (6 ft 0 in)
- Position: Forward

Team information
- Current team: Atlético Teresiano

Senior career*
Years	Team	Apps	(Gls)
2016–2018	Steadfast FC	23	(8)
2018–2019	RC Grasse	9	(2)
2020–2021	Steadfast FC	13	(6)
2021–2022	Elmina Sharks	14	(1)
2022	Steadfast FC	18	(8)
2022–2023	U. Criptanense	14	(6)
2023-	Atlético Teresiano	16	(5)

International career
2021	Black Stars B	0	(0)
- * Club domestic league appearances and goals

Alhassan Siisu (born 5 October 1998) is a Ghanaian professional footballer who plays as a forward for the Spanish club Atlético Teresiano.

== Career ==
Siisu left Republicans Football Club and started his professional career with Tamale-based club Steadfast FC, in Zone One of the Division One League, the Ghanaian second tier.

Siisu signed for Championnat National 2 club RC Grasse from 2018 to 2019. He made his debut and scored his first goal on 1 December 2018 in a 2–2 draw against Martigues.

He moved back to Steadfast FC during the 2020 season.

Siisu joined Elmina Sharks in January 2021–2022 ahead of their maiden Ghana Premier League season.

He had a third stint with Steadfast FC before moving abroad.

He signed for Spanish club U. Criptanense on 9 January 2022.

After one season at U. Criptanense, he joined Atlético Teresiano on 9 June 2023.

== International career ==
In August 2021, he was named in a 43-man squad with the Black Stars B team ahead of the 2023 CHAN qualification, but did not make the final squad.
