= Flory Yangao =

Central African Republic footballer

Personal information
- Full name: Flory Jean Michaël Yangao
- Date of birth: 13 January 2002 (age 24)
- Place of birth: Bangui, Central African Republic
- Height: 1.74 m (5 ft 9 in)
- Position: Right-back

Team information
- Current team: Olympic Real

Senior career*
Years	Team	Apps	(Gls)
2019–	Olympic Real		

International career^{‡}
2021	Central African Republic U20	4	(1)
2021–	Central African Republic	24	(0)
- * Club domestic league appearances and goals as of 22:37, 1 September 2021 (UTC) ‡ National team caps and goals as of 22:37, 10 June 2024 (UTC)

Flory Jean Michaël Yangao (born 13 January 2002) is a Central African professional footballer who plays as a right-back for Olympic Real and the Central African Republic national team.

== Club career ==
A youth international for the Central African Republic, he was named as part of the team of the tournament at the 2021 Africa U-20 Cup of Nations. He debuted with the senior Central African Republic national team in a 2–2 2021 Africa Cup of Nations qualification tie with Burundi on 26 March 2021.
