= Abdul Fatawu =

Ghanaian footballer (born 2004)

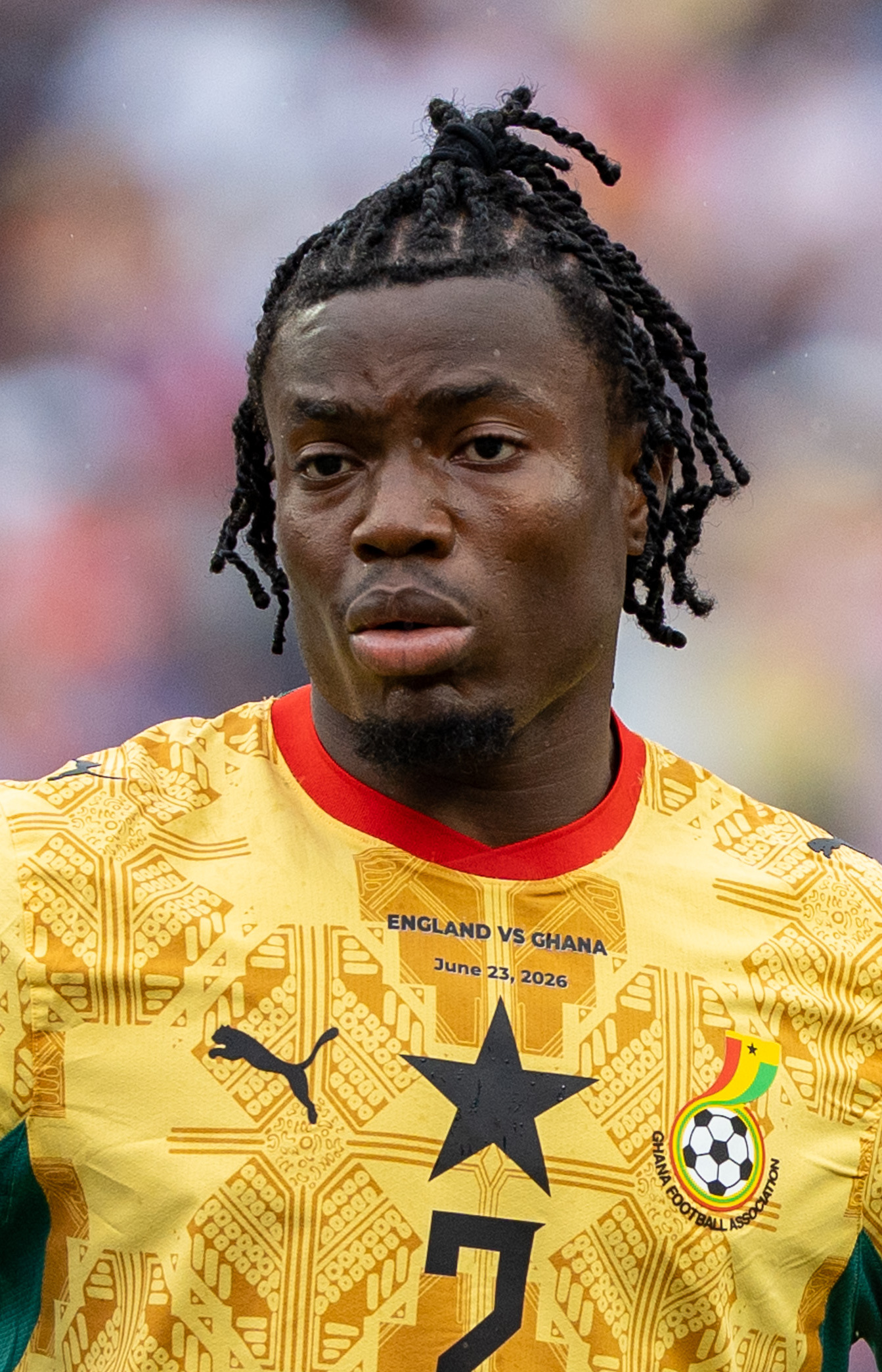
- Fatawu with Ghana in 2026

Personal information
- Full name: Abdul Fatawu Issahaku
- Date of birth: 8 March 2004 (age 22)
- Place of birth: Tamale, Ghana
- Height: 1.77 m (5 ft 10 in)
- Position: Winger

Team information
- Current team: Ipswich Town
- Number: 7

Youth career
- Tamale Utrecht Academy

Senior career*
Years	Team	Apps	(Gls)
2019–2022	Steadfast	27	(20)
2021–2022	→ Dreams (loan)	7	(6)
2022–2024	Sporting CP	6	(0)
2022–2023	Sporting CP B	13	(2)
2023–2024	→ Leicester City (loan)	40	(6)
2024–2026	Leicester City	55	(9)
2026–	Ipswich Town	1	(0)

International career^{‡}
2019–2020	Ghana U17	2	(1)
2021	Ghana U20	6	(2)
2023–	Ghana U23	2	(2)
2021–	Ghana	32	(3)
Medal record
Representing Ghana
Africa U-20 Cup of Nations
Winner	2021
- * Club domestic league appearances and goals as of 23:11, 24 April 2026 (UTC) ‡ National team caps and goals as of 11:25, 4 July 2026 (UTC)

Abdul Fatawu Issahaku (born 8 March 2004) is a Ghanaian professional footballer who plays as a winger for Premier League club Ipswich Town and the Ghana national team.

== Club career ==
=== Steadfast ===
In 2019, at the age of fifteen, Fatawu started his career with Tamale-based club Steadfast FC, in the Zone One of the Division One League, the Ghanaian second tier. During his debut season, he immediately established himself as one of the most talented players in the league, scoring eight goals and assisting five in 13 matches before the league was halted due to the COVID-19 pandemic.

In his second season, he scored 12 goals and made 12 assists in 14 league matches and picked up 8 man of the match awards. In 2021, after the Africa U-20 Cup of Nations, Fatawu was linked with several European teams, some of them being Liverpool, Bayer Leverkusen, and Sporting CP. In October 2021, Fatawu joined Dreams on a loan until 2022. In the same month, he was included in The Guardian's "Next Generation 2021", and was described by them as "arguably the best African prospect of his generation".

=== Sporting CP ===
In April 2022, he was signed by Sporting CP on a five-year contract with a release clause of €60 million. This brought finality to rumours of him joining Sporting CP on loan from Liverpool and other transfer saga rumour. Prior to signing officially Fatawu had been at the club since February and had been training with the U-23 side. As he was an under age player at the time, and with the season already ongoing, he couldn't be registered with the first-team until the 2022–23 season, then, he began to train with the B team until available to play for the professional team.

Ahead of the 2022–23 season, Fatawu was named in the squad for pre-season training and tour for the first team. He was involved in the team's preparations prior to the start of the season playing his first pre-season game against Belgium side Royale Union. On 7 August 2022, he was named on the bench for the first match of the season. The following weekend he made his debut after coming on in the 80th minute for Francisco Trincão in Sporting CP's 3–0 victory over Rio Ave.

==== Loan to Leicester City ====
On 31 August 2023, Fatawu signed for EFL Championship side Leicester City on a season-long loan from Sporting CP. He made his club debut in the EFL Championship three days later, coming on as a 54th-minute substitute in a 1–0 home loss to Hull City. On 21 October, he scored his first goal for the club in a 3–1 away win against Swansea City. On 23 April 2024, he scored his first professional hat-trick, in a 5–0 home win against promotion rivals, Southampton. There was a clause inserted into the loan that required Leicester to purchase Fatawu upon promotion for €17 million, which they did in May 2024. 50% of the difference between the sale price to Sporting (€1.2 million) and Leicester was provided to Fatawu's original club, Steadfast FC, who had inserted a sell-on clause in his sale to Sporting.

=== Leicester City ===
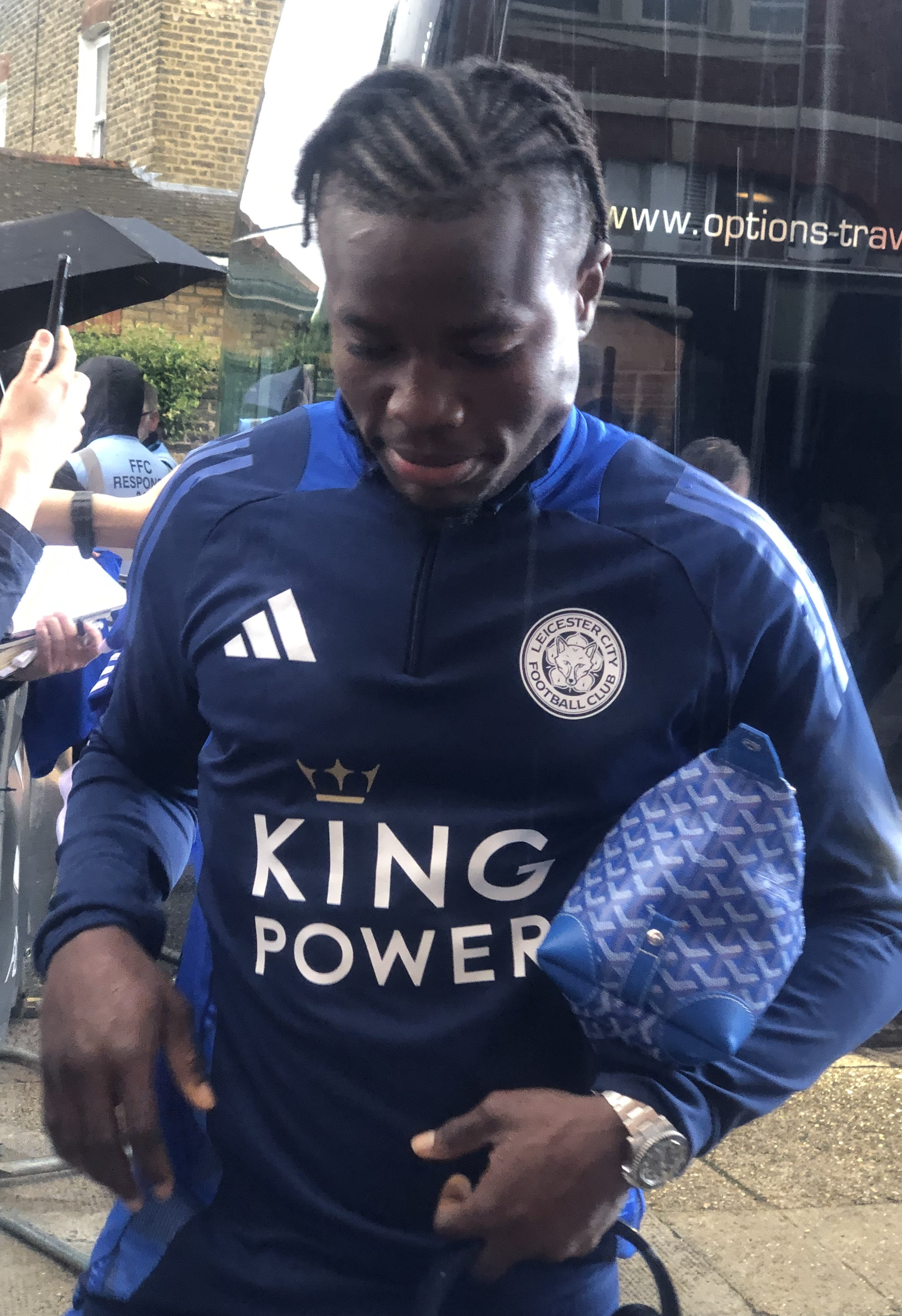
Fatawu with Leicester City in 2024

On 1 July 2024, Leicester City activated the buy clause and signed for €10 million on a permanent five-year deal contract with €7 million additional fee. As a result, his jersey number changed from No. 18 to No. 7. On 19 August 2024, he made his first Premier League debut as part of the first team squad for Leicester City against Tottenham Hotspur. In that same game, Fatawu provided his first Premier League assist for Jamie Vardy in a 1–1 home draw. On 13 December 2025, he scored from his own half in a 3–1 victory over Ipswich Town.

=== Ipswich Town ===
On 21 July 2026, Fatawu joined newly promoted Premier League club Ipswich Town for an undisclosed fee on a five-year contract.

== International career ==
=== Youth team ===
In 2018, Fatawu was part of Ghana's national under-17 team managed by Karim Zito. The team reached the finals of the 2018 WAFU Zone B U-17 Cup of Nations. They however lost in the final to rivals Nigeria via a 3–1 penalty shootout after a 1–1 draw after regulation time, with Fatawu missing his penalty in the shootout. Fatawu remained a member of the Ghana U-17 team and served as captain of the team in 2020, playing during the 2021 Africa U-17 Cup of Nations qualifiers, during 2020 WAFU Zone B U-17 Cup of Nations. At the tournament he scored the equalising penalty in Ghana's 1–1 draw against Nigeria. Ghana were eliminated from the competition after losing 3–1 against Ivory Coast in their final group game. Ghana's only goal of the game was assisted by Fatawu.

The following year, due to his impressive form, Fatawu was promoted into the under-20 squad at the age of 16, despite being much younger than the majority of his teammates. He was later selected to take part in the 2021 Africa U-20 Cup of Nations. During the competition, he played all of the Black Satellites' matches, scoring two goals in the group stages to help his side win the title for the fourth time in its history. In that occasion, he was also adjudged as the Best Player of the Tournament.

=== Senior team ===
In March 2021, after his exploits with the U-20 side, Fatawu was given his first call-up to the senior team by C.K. Akonnor, as the Black Stars challenged South Africa and São Tomé and Príncipe in two qualifying matches for the Africa Cup of Nations. He was called up alongside teammates from the U-20 AFCON winning team, Philomon Baffour and Ibrahim Danlad.

Fatawu scored a free-kick goal against Uzbekistan when the Black Stars' B Team played Uzbekistan at the Markaziy Stadium. Even though the game ended 2–1 for Uzbekistan, he was highly praised by his performance.

In September 2021, Fatawu made his debut for the Black Stars in a 3–1 victory over Zimbabwe in a 2022 FIFA World Cup qualifier. Fatawu made the 28-man squad for 2021 Africa Cup of Nations. He was the youngest player in the Ghanaian team and the fourth youngest at the tournament. On 27 September 2021, Fatawu scored his debut goal for the Ghana senior team against Nicaragua.

On June 2, 2026, Fatawu was integrated by Ghana's coach Carlos Queiroz into his list of 26 players in order to compete in the 2026 FIFA World Cup.

== Career statistics ==
=== Club ===
As of match played 24 April 2026

Appearances and goals by club, season and competition
Club	Season	League			National cup (Note: Includes Taça de Portugal, FA Cup)		League cup (Note: Includes Taça da Liga, EFL Cup)		Continental		Total	
Club	Season	Division	Apps	Goals	Apps	Goals	Apps	Goals	Apps	Goals	Apps	Goals
Steadfast	2019–20	Division One League	13	8	0	0	—		—		13	8
Steadfast	2020–21	Division One League	14	12	0	0	—		—		14	12
Steadfast	Total		27	20	0	0	0	0	0	0	27	20
Dreams (loan)	2021–22	Ghana Premier League	7	6	0	0	—		—		7	6
Sporting CP B	2022–23	Liga 3	13	2	0	0	—		—		13	2
Sporting CP	2022–23	Primeira Liga	6	0	1	0	2	0	3 (Note: Two appearances in UEFA Champions League, one appearance in UEFA Europa League)	0	12	0
Leicester City (loan)	2023–24	Championship	40	6	2	1	1	0	—		43	7
Leicester City	2024–25	Premier League	11	0	0	0	2	0	—		13	0
Leicester City	2025–26	Championship	44	9	0	0	0	0	—		44	9
Leicester City	Leicester total		95	15	2	1	3	0	0	0	100	16
Ipswich Town	2026-27	Premier League	5	1	0	0	0	0	—		5	1
Career total			133	41	3	1	5	0	3	0	144	42

=== International ===
As of match played 3 July 2026

Appearances and goals by national team and year
National team	Year	Apps	Goals
Ghana	2021	2	0
Ghana	2022	12	1
Ghana	2023	1	0
Ghana	2024	9	1
Ghana	2025	1	0
Ghana	2026	7	1
Total		32	3

Scores and results list Ghana's goal tally first, score column indicates score after each Fatawu goal.

List of international goals scored by Abdul Fatawu
No.	Date	Venue	Opponent	Score	Result	Competition
1	27 September 2022	Estadio Francisco Artés Carrasco, Lorca, Spain	Nicaragua	1–0	1–0	Friendly
2	10 June 2024	Baba Yara Stadium, Kumasi, Ghana	Central African Republic	3–2	4–3	2026 FIFA World Cup qualification
3	30 March 2026	MHP Arena, Stuttgart, Germany	Germany	1–1	1–2	Friendly

== Honours ==
Leicester City

- EFL Championship: 2023–24

Ghana U17

- WAFU U-17 Cup of Nations runner-up: 2018

Ghana U20

- Africa U-20 Cup of Nations: 2021

Individual

- Africa U-20 Cup of Nations Best Player: 2021
- Africa U-20 Cup of Nations Best XI: 2021
- Odartey Lamptey Future Star Award: 2021
- SWAG Discovery of the Year: 2021
- Ghana Premier League Player of the Month: November 2021
- Leicester City Young Player of the Season: 2023–24
- Leicester City Goal of the Season: 2025–26
- EFL Championship Goal of the Month: August 2025, February 2026
