= Ibrahim Danlad =

Ghanaian footballer (born 2002)

Personal information
- Date of birth: 2 December 2002 (age 23)
- Place of birth: Sunyani, Ghana
- Height: 1.81 m (5 ft 11 in)
- Position: Goalkeeper

Team information
- Current team: Asante Kotoko SC
- Number: 1

Youth career
- 2015-2016: Hamburg FC Sunyani

Senior career*
Years	Team	Apps	(Gls)
2016–2024	Asante Kotoko	13	(0)
2019–2021	→ Berekum Chelsea (loan)	14	(0)
2020–2021	→ King Faisal (loan)	12	(0)
2024–2026	Ethiopian Coffee S.C.	55	(0)
2026	Asante Kotoko	0	(0)

International career^{‡}
2017	Ghana U17	12	(0)
2019	Ghana U20	0	(0)
2019	Ghana U23	0	(0)
2021	Ghana U20	11	(0)
2022–	Ghana	7	(0)
- * Club domestic league appearances and goals ‡ National team caps and goals as of 28 January 2023

Ibrahim Danlad (born 2 December 2002) is a Ghanaian professional footballer who plays as a goalkeeper Ethiopian Premier League club Ethiopian Coffee S.C. and the Ghana national team.

== Club career ==
Born in Sunyani, Danlad joined Asante Kotoko in 2016–17 season.

In December 2019, Danlad joined Ghana Premier League club Berekum Chelsea for the rest of the 2019–20 season.

In the 2020/2021 football season in Ghana, Danlad Ibrahim joined Ghana Premier League side King Faisal F.C. on a season long loan. He returned to his parent club, Asante Kotoko S.C. where he took the number 1 spot until his contract expired in 2024.

Ethiopian Coffee S.C

The Ghanaian goalkeeper joined Ethiopian Premier League side Ethiopian Coffee S.C. on August 8, 2024, on a free transfer. Danlad spent 2-years at the Ethiopian side and played 55 games conceding 38 goals and keeping 28 clean sheets. He returned to Asante Kotoko SC ahead of the 2026/2027 Ghana Premier League.

== International career ==
Danlad has played for Ghana at all levels, having represented the nation at under-17 to the senior national team (Black Stars) level.

In 2017, he was the first choice goalkeeper for the Ghana squad which participated at the 2017 FIFA U-17 World Cup in India, playing all the matches.

== Honours ==
Asante Kotoko

- Ghana Premier League: 2021–22
- Democracy Cup Ghana: 2026

Ghana U20

- Africa U-20 Cup of Nations: 2021
- WAFU Zone B U-20 Tournament: 2020

Individual

- Golden Glove WAFU Zone B U-20 Tournament: 2020
- Golden Glove Africa U-20 Cup of Nations: 2021
- IFFHS CAF Youth Team of the Year: 2020
- Ghana Football Awards Goalkeeper of the year: 2021
