= Alfred Gombe-Fei =

Central African Republic association footballer

Alfred Toussaint Gombe-Fei
Personal information
- Full name: Alfred Toussaint Gombe-Fei
- Date of birth: 1 November 2001 (age 25)
- Place of birth: Bimbo, Central African Republic
- Height: 1.90 m (6 ft 3 in)
- Position: Striker

Team information
- Current team: Foshan Nanshi
- Number: 9

Senior career*
| Years | Team | Apps | (Gls) |
| 2020–2021 | Red Star Bangui | | |
| 2021–2024 | MFK Vyškov | 1 | (0) |
| 2022 | → Tacoma Defiance (loan) | 5 | (0) |
| 2023–2024 | → Elite Falcons (loan) | 27 | (17) |
| 2024– | Foshan Nanshi | 6 | (0) |

International career^{‡}
| 2021 | Central African Republic U20 | 4 | (1) |
| 2021– | Central African Republic | 1 | (0) |
- * Club domestic league appearances and goals as of 12:43, 25 September 2022 (UTC) ‡ National team caps and goals as of 21:23, 13 April 2021 (UTC)

Alfred Gombe-Fei (born 1 November 2001) is a Central African footballer who plays for China League Two club Foshan Nanshi.

== Club career ==
=== MFK Vyškov ===
After impressing at 2021 Africa U-20 Cup of Nations Gombe-Fei joined Czech National Football League club MFK Vyškov in October 2021.

==== Loan to Tacoma Defiance ====
On 16 March 2022 Gombe-Fei was loaned to MLS Next Pro club Tacoma Defiance until 30 November 2022.

=== Foshan Nanshi ===
On 3 March 2024, Gombe-Fei joined China League One club Foshan Nanshi.

== International career ==
Gombe-Fei represented the Central African Republic in the 2021 Africa U-20 Cup of Nations. He scored the opening goal in the team's final match of the group stage, an eventual 2–1 victory over Tunisia.

He made his senior international debut on 30 March 2021 in a 2021 Africa Cup of Nations qualifying match against Mauritania.

== Career statistics ==
=== International ===
As of match played 30 March 2021

| National team | Year | Apps | Goals |
|---|---|---|---|
| Central African Republic | 2021 | 1 | 0 |
| Total | | 1 | 0 |
