= Ben Starkie =

Tanzanian footballer

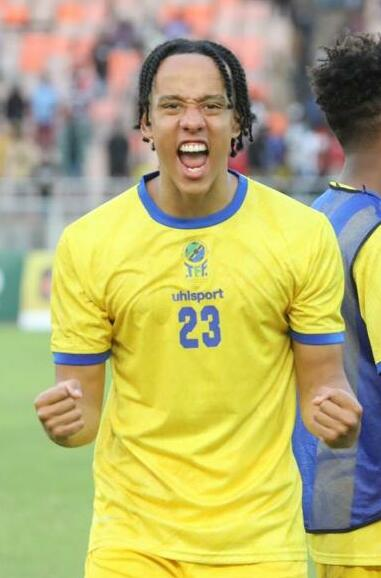

Personal information
- Full name: Ben Anthony Starkie
- Date of birth: 23 July 2002 (age 24)
- Place of birth: Leicester, England
- Position: Attacking midfielder

Team information
- Current team: Truro City

Youth career
- 2012–2018: Leicester City

Senior career*
Years	Team	Apps	(Gls)
2020–2021	Wilhelmshaven	4	(4)
2021–2021	Shepshed Dynamo	24	(8)
2021–2022	Spalding United	16	(7)
2022–2023	Basford United	32	(7)
2023–2024	Alfreton Town	1	(0)
2023–2024	Ilkeston Town	29	(9)
2024–2025	Harborough Town	40	(5)
2025–	Truro City	18	(0)

International career^{‡}
2018	Tanzania U17	1	(0)
2021	Tanzania U20	10	(0)
2022–	Tanzania	4	(0)
- * Club domestic league appearances and goals as of 16:37, 14 October 2026 (UTC) ‡ National team caps and goals as of 16:37, 14 October 2026 (UTC)

Ben Anthony Starkie (born 23 July 2002) is a footballer who plays as an attacking midfielder for National League South club Truro City. Born in England, he plays for the Tanzania national team.

== Club career ==
A youth product of Leicester City and Wilhelmshaven, Starkie moved to Shepshed Dynamo on 16 July 2021. On 13 November 2021, he transferred to Spalding United.

In August 2023, Starkie joined National League North club Alfreton Town. On 23 September 2023, he joined Ilkeston Town on a dual-registration basis.

In September 2024, Starkie joined Southern League Premier Division Central club Harborough Town. He was part of the team that qualified for the first round of the FA Cup for the first time in the club's history. After defeating Tonbridge Angels 4–1 in the first round, they met League One side Reading in the second round, losing 5–3 in extra time. Starkie featured in both matches.

On 7 August 2025, Starkie joined newly promoted National League club Truro City on an initial one-year deal.

== International career ==
Starkie was called up to represent the Tanzania U17 on 30 January 2019, becoming the first ever international call-up in Wilhelmshaven's history He represented the Tanzania U20 at the 2021 Africa U-20 Cup of Nations. He was called up to the senior Tanzania national team for a set of friendlies in March 2022. He debuted with Tanzania in a 3–1 friendly win over Central African Republic on 24 March 2022.
