= Derrick Kakooza =

Ugandan footballer (born 2002)

Personal information
- Date of birth: 23 October 2002 (age 24)
- Place of birth: Kampala, Uganda
- Height: 1.85 m (6 ft 1 in)
- Position: Forward

Team information
- Current team: Tërbuni Pukë

Youth career
- Naguru Police Academy

Senior career*
| Years | Team | Apps | (Gls) |
| 2019–2021 | Police Kampala | 18 | (7) |
| 2022 | Valmiera II | 13 | (2) |
| 2023 | KuPS | 0 | (0) |
| 2023 | ENPPI | 0 | (0) |
| 2023–2024 | Ethiopian Coffee | 4 | (1) |
| 2025– | Tërbuni Pukë | | |

International career^{‡}
| 2021 | Uganda U20 | 6 | (5) |
| 2022– | Uganda | 5 | (0) |
- * Club domestic league appearances and goals as of 02:23, 13 February 2025 (UTC) ‡ National team caps and goals as of 11:00, 30 January 2023 (UTC)

Derrick Kakooza (born 23 October 2002) is a Ugandan professional footballer who plays as a forward for Tërbuni Pukë in Kategoria e Dytë.

== Club career ==
Born in Kampala, Kakooza started his career with the Naguru Police Academy, before joining Police Kampala. Having been promoted to the first team with Police, his impressive performances in the 2021 Africa U-20 Cup of Nations linked him with a move to Belgian side Anderlecht. His league performances were also good, scoring eight goals in eighteen games across two seasons.

After the move to Anderlecht fell through, Kakooza completed a move to Latvian side Valmiera in early 2022 from Police FC.

Having played one game in the Finnish League Cup for KuPS, Kakooza signed for Egyptian side ENPPI in January 2023.

== Career statistics ==
=== Club ===
As of 6 May 2025

Appearances and goals by club, season and competition
| Club | Season | League | | | Cup | | Continental | | Other | | Total | |
| Club | Season | Division | Apps | Goals | Apps | Goals | Apps | Goals | Apps | Goals | Apps | Goals |
|---|---|---|---|---|---|---|---|---|---|---|---|---|
| Police Kampala | 2019–20 | Uganda Premier League | 6 | 4 | 0 | 0 | – | | 0 | 0 | 6 | 4 |
| Police Kampala | 2020–21 | Uganda Premier League | 12 | 4 | 0 | 0 | – | | 0 | 0 | 12 | 4 |
| Police Kampala | Total | | 18 | 8 | 0 | 0 | 0 | 0 | 0 | 0 | 18 | 8 |
| Valmiera II | 2022 | Latvian First League | 13 | 2 | – | | 0 | 0 | 0 | 0 | 13 | 2 |
| KuPS | 2023 | Veikkausliiga | 0 | 0 | 0 | 0 | 0 | 0 | 1 (Note: Appearances in the Finnish League Cup) | 0 | 1 | 0 |
| ENPPI | 2022–23 | Egyptian Premier League | 0 | 0 | 0 | 0 | 0 | 0 | 0 | 0 | 0 | 0 |
| Ethiopian Coffee | 2023–24 | Ethiopian Premier League | 6 | 1 | – | | – | | – | | 6 | 1 |
| Tërbuni Pukë | 2024–25 | Kategoria e Dytë | | | – | | – | | – | | | |
| Career total | | | 37 | 11 | 0 | 0 | 0 | 0 | 1 | 0 | 38 | 11 |

=== International ===
As of matches played 8 May 2022.

| National team | Year | Apps | Goals |
|---|---|---|---|
| Uganda | 2022 | 5 | 0 |
| Total | | 5 | 0 |

== Honours ==
Uganda U20

- Africa U-20 Cup of Nations; Runner-up: 2021

Individual

- U-20 Africa Cup of Nations Golden Boot: 2021
