= Brahima Ouattara =

Ivorian footballer

Personal information
- Date of birth: 23 November 2002 (age 23)
- Place of birth: Koko, Ivory Coast
- Height: 1.72 m (5 ft 8 in)
- Position: Midfielder

Team information
- Current team: Dubai United
- Number: 80

Senior career*
Years	Team	Apps	(Gls)
2018–2021	RC Abidjan	51	(20)
2020–2022	Nice	0	(0)
2022–2022	→ Lausanne-Sport (loan)	37	(5)
2022–2023	Neuchâtel Xamax	11	(3)
2023	RC Abidjan	13	(13)
2023–2024	Auda	3	(2)
2024	Northern Colorado Hailstorm	0	(0)
2024–	Dubai United	1	(0)

International career^{‡}
2020	Ivory Coast U20	4	(2)
2023	Ivory Coast U23	1	(0)
- * Club domestic league appearances and goals as of 15 November 2023 ‡ National team caps and goals as of 06:43, 31 March 2023 (UTC)

Brahima Ouattara (born 23 November 2002) is an Ivorian professional footballer who plays for UAE First Division League club Dubai United as a midfielder.

== Club career ==
Ouattara began his career with RC Abidjan in Ivory Coast. In January 2021, he signed for Nice in France before joining Lausanne-Sport on loan for the 2020–21 season. He made his professional debut with the club in a 1–0 Swiss Super League loss to Young Boys on 10 February 2021. At the end of the season, Lausanne-Sport extended the loan.

On 24 August 2022, Ouattara signed with Neuchâtel Xamax.

Ouattara joined USL League One side Northern Colorado Hailstorm on 29 January 2024.

== International career ==
Ouattara represented the Ivory Coast U20s for 2021 Africa U-20 Cup of Nations qualification matches, where he scored 2 goals in 4 games.
