= Daniel Afriyie =

Ghanaian footballer (born 2001)

Personal information
- Full name: Daniel Afriyie Barnieh
- Date of birth: 26 June 2001 (age 25)
- Place of birth: Kumasi, Ghana
- Height: 1.70 m (5 ft 7 in)
- Positions: Attacking midfielder; forward

Team information
- Current team: Aarau
- Number: 18

Senior career*
Years	Team	Apps	(Gls)
2018–2019	Rahimo		
2020–2023	Hearts of Oak	62	(13)
2023–2025	Zürich	43	(2)
2023–2025	Zürich II	7	(1)
2025–	Aarau	44	(13)

International career^{‡}
2020–2021	Ghana U20	10	(3)
2022–2023	Ghana U23	6	(4)
2022–	Ghana	9	(4)
- * Club domestic league appearances and goals as of 18 September 2026 ‡ National team caps and goals as of 19 January 2023

Daniel Afriyie Barnieh (born 26 June 2001) is a Ghanaian professional footballer who plays as an attacking midfielder or a forward for Aarau in the Swiss Challenge League.

== Early life ==
Born in the Ashanti Region of Ghana, Afriyie is an Akan by birth and descent. He attended Dunyan Nkwanta JHS in the Ahafo Ano South district, Mankranso in Ashanti Region and later proceeded to Aduman Senior High School in Aduman for his secondary school education. He admired Brazilian striker Ronaldo and idolizes Sergio Agüero who he considers as his idol.

== Club career ==
=== Early career ===
Afriyie featured for a number of colts (juvenile) clubs in the Ashanti Region where he ascended to a cult hero status. He began at Amansie FC before joining Celtic Academy in Kumasi then moved to colts club Valencia in 2015.

“I’ve never really seen myself as an out-and-out striker, but I did not have the choice to tell the coach my favourite position. They might have dropped me,”

— Afriyie talking about his trial time at Kotoko.

He moved a step further in his career by moving to the Ghana Division Two League with Galaxy United where he featured from 2016 to 2017. In January 2018, Afriyie joined Burkina Faso top flight side Rahimo FC where helped the club to win the Burkinabé Premier League in the 2018–19 Burkinabé Premier League season and secure qualification to the 2019–20 CAF Champions League. He made a return to Ghana and joined Thunder Bolt also in the Ghana Division Two League and played for a short stint before securing a move to Madina Republicans in the same league in 2019. In December 2019, Afriyie was given a four-week trial at Kumasi Asante Kotoko. He failed to impress during the trials after being played out of position as an out and out striker but found it difficult to communicate it to the coach with fear of being dropped.

=== Hearts of Oak ===
The following month after being dropped by Kotoko, Afriyie was given another chance to play for a Ghana Premier League side after he was offered as part of negotiations between Hearts of Oak and Abdul Aziz Nurudeen who he shared the same agent with. He was given the opportunity to trial and be observed by the head coach. Fortunately for him, he impressed the technical staff and on 15 January 2020 he was signed on a three-year deal ahead of the 2019–20 Ghana Premier League. He made his debut on 19 January 2020 in a 2–1 away win against Liberty Professionals.

=== FC Zürich ===
On 3 January 2023, Afriyie officially joined Swiss side Zürich for an undisclosed fee, signing a contract until June 2026 with the club. The player's registration was set to be completed after his participation in the 2022 African Nations Championship with the Ghana A' national team.

=== FC Aarau ===
On 8 July 2025, Afriyie Barnieh joined Swiss Challenge League side FC Aarau on a two-year contract following the mutual termination of his deal with FC Zürich. The move was seen as an opportunity for the Ghanaian forward to secure regular playing time after a difficult spell at Zürich.

Barnieh made his debut for Aarau on 26 July 2025 in their opening league match against Bellinzona. He provided an assist in the 54th minute and scored his first goal for the club shortly after, contributing to a 3–1 lead before the match was abandoned due to a waterlogged pitch.

On 26 August 2025, he scored a brace in a 3–0 victory over Stade Lausanne-Ouchy, netting in the 22nd and 63rd minutes.

By October 2025, Barnieh had scored four goals and provided three assists in his first nine league appearances for Aarau, averaging 0.82 goal contributions per 90 minutes.

== International career ==
In October 2019, Afriyie received a call up into Ghana national under-23 preliminary squad ahead of the 2019 U-23 Africa Cup of Nations, though reports were that he put on an impressive showdown, he missed out on the final squad.

In August 2020, he was named on the Ghana national under-20 preliminary squad for the 2020 WAFU Zone B U-20 Tournament, which also served as the qualifiers for the Africa U-20 Cup of Nations. He made the final squad and was appointed as the captain of the side. He led Ghana to win the trophy and qualify for the 2021 Africa U-20 Cup of Nations. In the final, he inspired the team by scoring the equalizer via a free-kick from Percious Boah in the 21st minute to trigger a comeback over their neighbours Burkina Faso in the final. Boah later scored the final goal to seal the victory.

Afriyie made the squad for the 2021 Africa U-20 Cup of Nations and again led Ghana to win the tournament for the first time in 12 years, since winning in 2009. On 6 March, during the final, he scored a brace, one in each half to lead Ghana to a 2–0 victory and emerge as the African U-20 Champions for the 4th time in the country's history. The game coincided with Ghana's 64th Independence Day celebration which drew in more excitement after the victory. Afriyie was ultimately adjudged the man of the match of the final.

On 3 August 2021, after an impressive season with Hearts of Oak, Afriyie received his debut call up to the Ghana A' (Black Galaxies) under the management of Annor Walker for a camping exercise ahead of their upcoming international assignments including 2022 CHAN qualifiers and 2021 WAFU Nations Cup. A week later, under the management of C.K. Akunnor, Afriyie was handed his first call-up into the Ghana senior team, the Black Stars, ahead of Ghana's 2022 Qatar FIFA World Cup Group G qualifiers against Ethiopia and South Africa. He was one of the five home-based players to make the squad.

== Career statistics ==
=== Club ===
As of 5 August 2023

Appearances and goals by club, season and competition
Club	Season	League			Cup		Continental		Other		Total	
Club	Season	Division	Apps	Goals	Apps	Goals	Apps	Goals	Apps	Goals	Apps	Goals
Hearts of Oak	2019–20	Ghana Premier League	10	1	0	0	—		—		10	1
Hearts of Oak	2020–21	Ghana Premier League	22	3	6	5	—		—		28	8
Hearts of Oak	2021–22	Ghana Premier League	26	8	4	3	5 (Note: Three appearances in CAF Champions League, two appearances and in CAF Confederation Cup)	0	1 (Note: Appearances in President's Cup)	1	36	12
Hearts of Oak	2022–23	Ghana Premier League	4	1	0	0	2	0	0	0	6	1
Hearts of Oak	Total		62	13	10	8	7	0	1	1	80	22
Zürich	2022–23	Swiss Super League	6	2	0	0	0	0	0	0	6	2
Career total			68	15	10	8	7	0	1	1	86	24

=== International ===
Scores and results list Ghana's goal tally first, score column indicates score after each Afriyie goal.

List of international goals scored by Daniel Afriyie
No.	Date	Venue	Opponent	Score	Result	Competition
1	24 July 2022	Cape Coast Sports Stadium, Cape Coast, Ghana	Benin	1–0	3–0	2022 African Nations Championship qualification
2	30 July 2022	Stade de l'Amitié, Cotonou, Benin	Benin	1–0	1–0	2022 African Nations Championship qualification
3	29 August 2022	Cape Coast Sports Stadium, Cape Coast, Ghana	Nigeria	1–0	2–0	2022 African Nations Championship qualification
4	19 January 2023	Chahid Hamlaoui Stadium, Constantine, Algeria	Sudan	2–1	3–1	2022 African Nations Championship

== Honours ==
Rahimo

- Burkinabé Premier League: 2018–19

Hearts of Oak

- Ghana Premier League: 2020–21
- Ghanaian FA Cup: 2021 2022
- Ghana Super Cup: 2021
- President's Cup: 2022

Ghana U20

- Africa U-20 Cup of Nations: 2021
- WAFU Zone B U-20 Tournament: 2020

Individual

- SWAG Home-based Footballer of the Year: 2021, 2022
- Ghanaian FA Cup Top scorer: 2021
- Ghanaian FA Cup Player of the Year: 2022
