= Steadfast F.C. =

Football team in Ghana

Steadfast FC
- Full name: Steadfast Football Club
- Ground: Tamale Stadium
- Capacity: 20,000
- Owner: Haruna Iddrisu
- League: Division One League, Ghana

Steadfast Football Club is a Ghanaian professional football club based in Tamale in the Northern Region of Ghana that was founded by Ghanaian politician Haruna Iddrisu. As for the season 2020/21, the club competes in Zone One of the Division One League which is the second tier of the football league system in Ghana, and the MTN FA Cup. The club plays their home fixtures at the Tamale Stadium, and are rivals with city neighbours Real Tamale United and Tamale City FC.

== History ==
The club is owned by Ghanaian politician Haruna Iddrisu and its located in Tamale in the Northern Region of Ghana. In 2021, one of the key players of the team Abdul Fatawu Issahaku, won the 2021 Africa U-20 Cup of Nations and was also named the Best Player of the Tournament. He was subsequently called up to the senior national team the Black Stars, Ghana national football team in March 2021.

== Grounds ==
The club plays their home matches at the Aliu Mahama Sports Stadium.

Outside view of Tamale Stadium in 2008

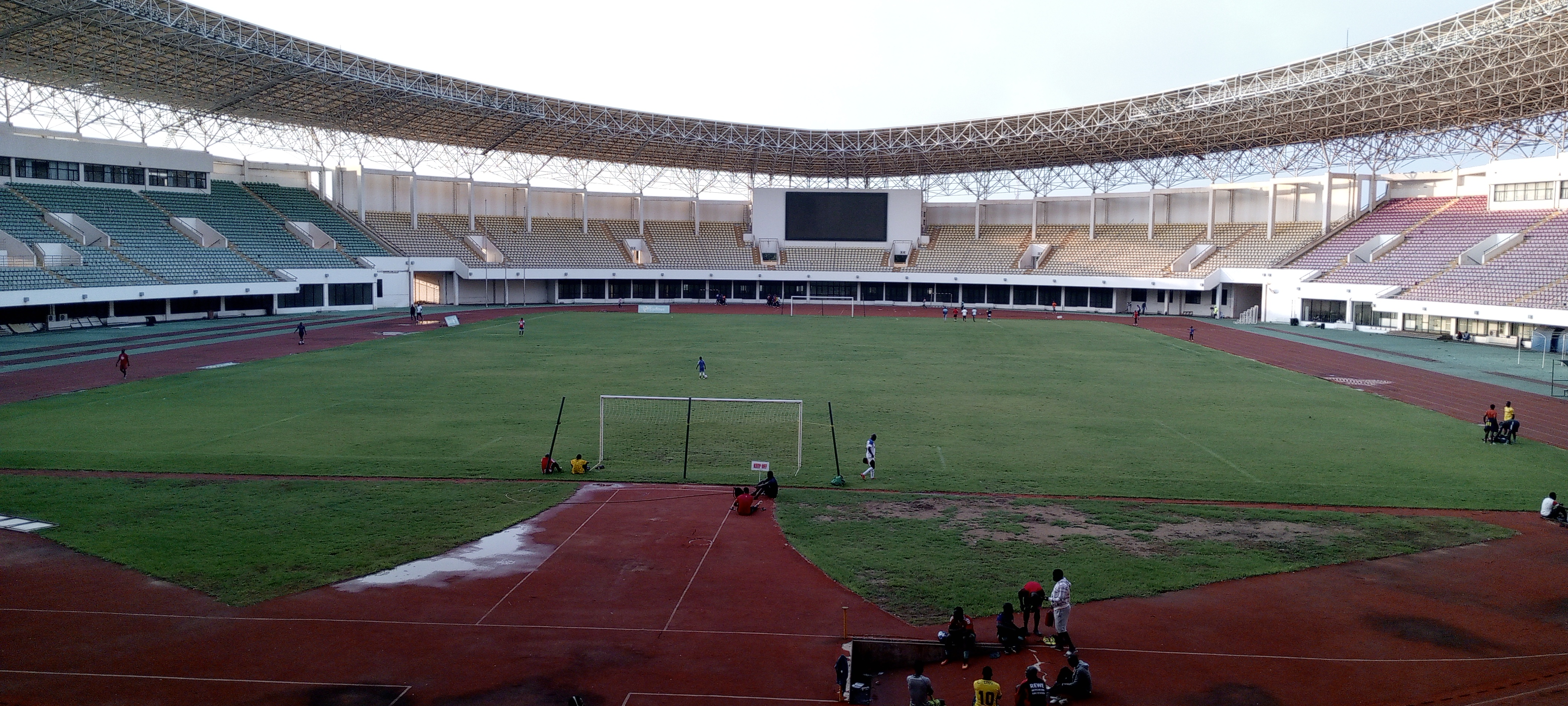
Interior view

== Support ==
=== Rivalries ===
Steadfast FC has rivalries with Real Tamale United, Tamale City FC. All three clubs are located in Tamale, Ghana, therefore causing an interesting and fierce rivalry amongst one another and generating a buzz and headlines within the media space once their fixtures are getting closer within the season.
