= Chiheb Labidi =

Tunisian footballer

Personal information
- Date of birth: 1 June 2001 (age 25)
- Place of birth: Tunisia
- Height: 1.90 m (6 ft 3 in)
- Position: Midfielder

Team information
- Current team: Nacional
- Number: 15

Youth career
- Club Africain

Senior career*
Years	Team	Apps	(Gls)
2018–2024	Club Africain	66	(5)
2024–	Nacional	45	(2)

International career^{‡}
2020–2021	Tunisia U20	13	(3)
- * Club domestic league appearances and goals as of 25 May 2026 ‡ National team caps and goals as of 10 October 2021

Chiheb Labidi (born 1 June 2001) is a Tunisian professional footballer who plays as a midfielder for Primeira Liga club Nacional.

== Club career ==
Chiheb Labidi made his professional debut for Club Africain on 28 April 2019, coming on as a substitute in the Ligue Pro 1 game against AS Gabès.

== International career ==
With Tunisia U20, Labidi reached the U20 CAN semifinals in 2021. He eventually was named in the best XI of the competition.
