= Enock Wanyama =

Kenyan footballer

Enock Brian Wanyama
Personal information
- Full name: Enock Brian Wanyama
- Date of birth: 22 September 2001 (age 25)
- Place of birth: Nkoroi, Rongai Kajiado County
- Height: 1.68 m (5 ft 6 in)
- Position: Winger

Youth career
- Nkoroi FC

Senior career*
Years	Team	Apps	(Gls)
2018–2019	South B United		
2019–2021	Ligi Ndogo S.C.		
2021–2022	FC Kariobangi Sharks	5	(0)
2023	Leopard Cat FC	0	(0)

International career^{‡}
2020	Kenya-U20	4	(1)
- * Club domestic league appearances and goals as of 19:31, 19 Aug 2022 (UTC) ‡ National team caps and goals as of 19:31, 19 Aug 2022 (UTC)

Enock Brian Wanyama is a Kenyan winger who turns out for Taipei-based Leopard Cat FC in the Taiwan Football Premier League. He formerly turned out for Kenyan Premier League side FC Kariobangi Sharks.

== Career ==
Wanyama started out at Nkoroi FC before moving to South B United Sports Academy (SUSA), a team he played for while at Highway Secondary School.

He later moved to Ligi Ndogo S.C., played for Kenya U20 in Nov-Dec 2020 during the 2021 Africa U-20 Cup of Nations qualification then traveled to Slovakia and tried out with FK Pohroniec.

He later joined Kenyan Premiership side F.C. Kariobangi Sharks in the year 2021. He left in mid-2022, and towards the later part of that year, he joined Gor Mahia F.C. albeit for training with a view of signing with the club during the mid-transfer window in February–March 2023.

== Awards ==
Wanyama was named the Most Valuable Player in 2019 after as South B United won Chapa Dimba na Safaricom Nairobi regional finals. He later made the All-Star team that toured Spain for ten days in May 2019.
