= Central African Republic national under-20 football team =

National under-20 association football team representing Central African Republic

Central African Republic
- Nickname(s): Les Fauves (The Wild Beasts)
- Association: Central African Football Federation
- Confederation: CAF (Africa)
- Sub-confederation: UNIFFAC (Central Africa)
- Head coach: (Central African Republic) Sébastein Ngato
- Captain: Marc Yapéndé
- Home stadium: Barthélémy Boganda Stadium
- FIFA code: CTA
First colours	Second colours

First international
- Central African Republic 1–1 Gabon (Bangui Central African Republic; 13 August 1990)

Biggest win
- Central African Republic 2–1 Equatorial Guinea (Malabo, Equatorial Guinea; 17 December 2020) Central African Republic 1–0 Cameroon (Brazzaville, Congo; 14 December 2022)

Biggest defeat
- Cameroon 5–1 Central African Republic (Yaoundé, Cameroon; 23 July 2010)

U-20 Africa Cup of Nations
- Appearances: 4 (first in 1981)
- Best result: Quarter-finals (2021)

UNIFFAC U-20 Cup
- Appearances: 1 (first in 2020)
- Best result: Runners-up (2020)

The Central African Republic national under-20 football team, nicknamed Les Fauves, is the national team of the Central African Republic and is controlled by the Central African Football Federation. They are a member of CAF. Despite being traditionally one of the weakest teams in Africa and the world, they recently achieved success.

== History ==
The Central Africa Republic under-20 national football team qualified for 2021 Africa U-20 Cup of Nations where the team progressed till the Quarter-finals.

== Players ==
The following players were selected for the 2025 U-20 Africa Cup of Nations, to be played between 27 April – 18 May 2025.

Caps and goals correct as of 2 May 2025, after the match against Senegal.

No.	Pos.	Player	Date of birth (age)	Caps	Goals	Club
1	GK	Malimoto Boarnages		1	0	(Central African Football Federation) Tempête Mocaf
16	GK	Eugène Ganazoui		0	0	Unknown
22	GK	Nick Maliki		0	0	(Central African Football Federation) DFC8 of Bangui
2	DF	Ouaguan Perry		0	0	(Central African Football Federation) SOS de Gbangouma
3	DF	Raphaël Nzabakomada-Yakoma	22 May 2007 (age 19)	1	0	(French Football Federation) Angers
4	DF	Ariel Jéhovany Marcelino Ondobo		0	0	(Central African Football Federation) DFC8 of Bangui
5	DF	Tony Biakolo	27 August 2006 (age 20)	4	0	(Swiss Football Association) Meyrin
6	DF	Junior John Christophe Nganza		0	0	(Central African Football Federation) Olympic Real de Bangui
17	DF	Kylan Chasseport	8 June 2007 (age 19)	0	0	(French Football Federation) Chamois Niortais
8	MF	Uchaël Borobona	13 May 2007 (age 19)	0	0	(French Football Federation) Clermont Foot
9	MF	Bradley Besnard		0	0	(French Football Federation) Cholet
10	MF	Bercier Eddy Jores Mbaigoto		1	0	Unknown
12	MF	Rayan Boubakar Kolingba		1	0	(French Football Federation) Bellevue Nantes
13	MF	Bamsou Lefort Dillane Kossina		1	0	(Central African Football Federation) EFC5 de Bangui
18	MF	Benjamin Idaro	26 January 2005 (age 21)	1	0	Free agent
19	MF	Yannis Yvan Doté		0	0	(French Football Federation) Nogent
20	MF	Dorkem Mbaikoua	8 May 2007 (age 19)	0	0	(French Football Federation) Lyon-La Duchère
21	MF	Junior Guiningbi-Yapou		0	0	(Central African Football Federation) DFC8 of Bangui
23	MF	Abdias Etienne Yangba	12 May 2006 (age 20)	1	0	(Italian Football Federation) Brindisi
24	MF	Benito Endjito		0	0	(Central African Football Federation) EFC5 de Bangui
25	MF	Christophe Yoanne Bernardin Gongoro-Pingo		0	0	(Central African Football Federation) Tempête Mocaf
26	MF	Nelson Geoffrad Ngoro		0	0	Unknown
7	FW	Ronaldo Lebon Zé		1	0	Unknown
11	FW	Landry Gâce á Dieu Tsoungui-Abega		1	0	Unknown
14	FW	Diogène Pengazonia		1	1	Unknown
15	FW	Baptiste Kilala	7 June 2007 (age 19)	1	0	(Royal Belgian Football Association) Royal Antwerp

== Competitive records ==
=== FIFA U-20 World Cup ===
Year	Round	Position	Pld	W	D	L	GF	GA
1977–2025	Did not qualify							
(Azerbaijan) (Uzbekistan) 2027	to be determined							

=== Africa U-20 Cup of Nations ===
Hosts/Year	Result	GP	W	D*	L	GS	GA
1979	Did not enter						
1981	Second round	1	1	0	0	4	1
1983–2009	Did not enter						
(South Africa) 2011	Did not qualify						
2013–2017	Did not enter						
(Niger) 2019	Did not enter						
(Mauritania) 2021	Quarter-finals	4	1	1	2	4	8
(Egypt) 2023	Group stage	3	0	1	2	1	3
(Egypt) 2025	Group stage	3	0	1	2	2	5
Total	4/18	11	2	3	6	11	17

*Draws include knockout matches decided by penalty shootout.

=== UNIFFAC U-20 Cup ===
Hosts/Year	Result	GP	W	D	L	GS	GA
(Equatorial Guinea) 2020	Runners-up	2	1	0	1	2	4
Total	1/1	2	1		1	2	4

== See also ==
- Central African Republic national football team
- Central African Republic national under-17 football team
