= Adam Ben Lamin =

Tunisian-Swedish footballer

Personal information
- Full name: Adam Karim Ben Lamin
- Date of birth: 2 June 2001 (age 25)
- Place of birth: Solna, Sweden
- Height: 1.84 m (6 ft 0 in)
- Position: Centre-back

Team information
- Current team: IFK Haninge
- Number: 4

Youth career
- 2005–2011: Vasalund
- 2011–2018: AIK

Senior career*
Years	Team	Apps	(Gls)
2018–2021	AIK	0	(0)
2018	→ Vasalund (loan)	0	(0)
2019	→ Utsikten (loan)	7	(0)
2021–2023	Jönköpings Södra	61	(0)
2024	CS Sfaxien	8	(0)
2025	KÍ	2	(0)
2025–	IFK Haninge	8	(0)

International career^{‡}
2017	Sweden U16	4	(0)
2017–2018	Sweden U17	2	(0)
2019	Tunisia Olympic	2	(0)
2021	Tunisia U20	6	(1)
2022–	Tunisia	1	(0)
- * Club domestic league appearances and goals as of 24 November 2025 ‡ National team caps and goals as of 18:16, 3 August 2022 (UTC)

Adam Karim Ben Lamin (Arabic: آدَم كَرِيْم بن لَامِيْن; born 2 June 2001) is a professional footballer who plays as a centre-back for IFK Haninge. Born in Sweden, he plays for the Tunisia national team.

== Early life ==
Ben Lamin was born in Solna, and grew up in the Rinkeby-Kista district of Stockholm.

== Career ==
Ben Lamin began playing football with the youth academy of Vasalund at the age of 4, and moved to the academy of AIK at the age of 10. After working his way up the U17 and U19 teams for AIK, he returned to Vasalund on loan in February 2018. He returned to AIK in 2018, and after a strong preseason signed a professional contract with them on 1 January 2019. On 16 August 2019, he went on loan with Utsikten in the Ettan. After returning to AIK, he trained with the professionals but did not make a competitive appearance for the club.

On 25 January 2021, Ben Lamin transferred to the Superettan club Jönköpings Södra on a 2-year contract.

== International career ==
Born in Sweden, Ben Lamin is of Tunisian descent. He first represented Sweden as a youth international, having played for the Sweden U16s and U17s.

In 2019, he was then called up by the Tunisia Olympic team for 2019 Africa U-23 Cup of Nations qualification matches. He was then called up to the Tunisia U20s for a set of friendlies in 2021.

Ben Lamin was first called up to the senior Tunisia national team in October 2019. He debuted with Tunisia in a 3–0 win in the 2022 Kirin Cup Soccer final against Japan on 14 June 2022.

== Playing style ==
Ben Lamin is seen as a versatile player that can play as centre-back, right-back, and defensive midfielder. He most often plays centre-back, and is noted for his aggressive play.

== Honours ==
Tunisia

- Kirin Cup Soccer: 2022
