= 1993 African Youth Championship =

Tournament details
- Host country: Mauritius
- Dates: 30 January – 10 February
- Teams: 8

Final positions
- Champions: Ghana (1st title)
- Runners-up: Cameroon
- Third place: Egypt
- Fourth place: Ethiopia

The 1993 African Youth Championship was a football tournament hosted on the island of Mauritius, off the east coast of Africa. The Championship was won by Ghana, who defeated Cameroon in the final, with both teams thus qualifying for the 1993 FIFA World Youth Championship.

== Qualification ==
=== Preliminary round ===
Gambia withdrew and therefore Senegal received a bye

Team 1	Agg.	Team 2	1st leg	2nd leg
Kenya	0–4	Uganda	0–2	0–2
Mali	8–2	Mauritania	6–1	2–1
Togo	(a)1–1	Niger	0–0	1–1

=== Main Round ===
Algeria, Cameroon, Congo, Egypt, Ethiopia, Ghana, Morocco, Nigeria, Senegal, Tunisia and Zimbabwe entered the tournament here.

Team 1	Agg.	Team 2	1st leg	2nd leg
Ethiopia	3–1	Togo	3–1	0–0
Algeria	1–4	Morocco	1–2	0–2
Ghana	3–0	Mali	2–0	1–0
Nigeria	DSQ	Congo	0–1	DSQ
Tunisia	3–5	Senegal	2–2	1–3
Cameroon	3–1	Uganda	1–0	2–1
Egypt	4–2	Zimbabwe	3–1	1–1

== Teams ==
The following teams qualified for tournament:

- Cameroon
- Egypt
- Ethiopia
- Ghana
- Mauritius (host)
- Morocco
- Nigeria
- Senegal

== Group stage ==
=== Group A ===
Pos	Team	Pld	W	D	L	GF	GA	GD	Pts	Qualification
1	Cameroon	3	2	0	1	4	2	+2	6	Advance to knockout stage
2	Ghana	3	2	0	1	2	2	0	6	Advance to knockout stage
3	Nigeria	3	1	0	2	2	2	0	3	
4	Mauritius (H)	3	1	0	2	2	4	−2	3	

Rules for classification: Group tiebreakers
(H) Hosts

30 January	Ghana	1–0	Mauritius
	Cameroon	1–0	Nigeria
1 February	Nigeria	2–0	Mauritius
	Cameroon	2–0	Ghana
3 February	Mauritius	2–1	Cameroon
	Ghana	1–0	Nigeria

=== Group B ===
Pos	Team	Pld	W	D	L	GF	GA	GD	Pts	Qualification
1	Egypt	3	2	1	0	5	1	+4	7	Advance to knockout stage
2	Ethiopia	3	2	0	1	5	3	+2	6	Advance to knockout stage
3	Morocco	3	1	0	2	4	6	−2	3	
4	Senegal	3	0	1	2	1	5	−4	1	

Rules for classification: Group tiebreakers

31 January	Egypt	0–0	Senegal
	Ethiopia	2–1	Morocco
2 February	Egypt	4–1	Morocco
	Ethiopia	3–1	Senegal
4 February	Egypt	1–0	Ethiopia
	Morocco	2–0	Senegal

== Semifinals ==
7 February 1993

Cameroon	5 – 0	Ethiopia

7 February 1993

Egypt	1 – 3 (aet)	Ghana

== Third place match ==
9 February 1993

Egypt	3 – 0	Ethiopia

== Final ==
10 February 1993

Ghana	2 – 0	Cameroon

1993 African Youth Championship

Ghana
First title

== Qualification to World Youth Championship ==
The two best performing teams qualified for the 1993 FIFA World Youth Championship.

- Cameroon
- Ghana
