= Momodou Bojang =

Gambian footballer (born 2001)

Personal information
- Date of birth: 19 June 2001 (age 25)
- Place of birth: Brikama, The Gambia
- Height: 1.82 m (6 ft 0 in)
- Position: Striker

Team information
- Current team: Lunds BK
- Number: 99

Youth career
- Brikama United
- Casa Sports

Senior career*
Years	Team	Apps	(Gls)
2020–2023	Rainbow		
2021–2022	→ Famalicão (loan)	0	(0)
2022	→ Hibernian (loan)	5	(0)
2023–2024	KAC Marrakech	4	(5)
2024–2025	SJK	10	(1)
2025	SJK II	3	(4)
2025	Raufoss	5	(0)
2026–	Lunds BK	23	(9)

International career^{‡}
- Gambia U17
- Gambia U20
- * Club domestic league appearances and goals as of 16 November 2026 ‡ National team caps and goals as of 10:20, 18 June 2022 (UTC)

Momodou Bojang (born 19 June 2001) is a Gambian professional footballer who plays for Swedish club Lunds BK as a striker.

== Club career ==
Bojang began his career with Brikama United, Casa Sports and Rainbow, and spent time on loan at Portuguese club Famalicão (playing for their under-23 team), before signing on loan for Scottish club Hibernian in June 2022. In December 2022, Hibs exercised an option to end the loan earlier than planned. Bojang later criticised his treatment by the club.

On 19 October 2024, after playing for Moroccan club KAC Marrakech in the country's second-tier Botola 2, Finnish Veikkausliiga club SJK Seinäjoki announced the signing of Bojang on a deal until the end of 2026 with a one-year option. On 5 April 2025, Bojang scored his first goal in Veikkausliiga, the winning goal in the 2025 season opening match against KTP at Arto Tolsa Areena.

On 19 July 2025, Bojang moved to Norway and signed with Raufoss IL for an undisclosed fee, with a contract until the end of 2027.

== International career ==
He has played for Gambia at under-17 and under-20 youth levels.

== Career statistics ==
As of 30 July 2026

Appearances and goals by club, season and competition
Club	Season	League			National cup (Note: Includes Moroccan Throne Cup and Finnish Cup)		League cup (Note: Includes Scottish League Cup, Finnish League Cup and Ykkösliigacup)		Continental		Total	
Club	Season	Division	Apps	Goals	Apps	Goals	Apps	Goals	Apps	Goals	Apps	Goals
Hibernian (loan)	2022–23	Scottish Premiership	5	0	0	0	2	0	–		7	0
KAC Marrakech	2023–24	Botola 2	4	5	1	0	–		–		5	5
SJK Seinäjoki	2024	Veikkausliiga	1	0	0	0	0	0	–		1	0
SJK Seinäjoki	2025	Veikkausliiga	9	1	1	0	4	0	0	0	14	1
SJK Seinäjoki	Total		10	1	1	0	4	0	0	0	15	1
SJK Akatemia	2025	Ykkösliiga	3	4	–		1	1	–		4	5
Raufoss	2025	1. divisjon	5	0	0	0	–		–		5	0
Lunds BK	2026	Ettan Södra	10	2	0	0	–		–		10	2
Career total			37	12	2	0	7	1	0	0	46	13
