= Percious Boah =

Ghanaian footballer

Personal information
- Date of birth: 23 October 2002 (age 24)
- Place of birth: Ghana
- Position: Forward

Youth career
- 2018–2019: Domping Soccer Angel

Senior career*
Years	Team	Apps	(Gls)
2020–2021	Dreams FC	16	(4)
2021–2022	Espérance de Tunis	0	(0)
2022	→ CS Hammam-Lif (loan)	1	(0)

International career
2019–	Ghana U20		
- * Club domestic league appearances and goals as of 1 July 2022

Percious Boah is a Ghanaian professional footballer who plays as a forward. He previously played for Ghana Premier league side Dreams FC

== Career ==
He scored a brace in a Ghana Premier League match against Ebusua Dwarfs which ended in a 2–0 victory for Dreams FC.

On 12 August 2021, Boah joined Tunisian giants Espérance de Tunis on a four-year deal.
