= Richard Basangwa =

Ugandan professional footballer

Personal information
- Date of birth: December 17, 2001 (age 24)
- Place of birth: Mulago, Uganda
- Position: Forward

Team information
- Current team: NEC FC

Youth career
- St Mary's Kitende

Senior career*
Years	Team	Apps	(Gls)
2021–2023	Gaddafi FC	9	(3)
2024–2026	Express FC	33	(3)
2026–	NEC FC	10	(4)

International career
2023–	Uganda	5	(0)
- * Club domestic league appearances and goals

Richard Basangwa (born 17 December 2001) is a Ugandan professional footballer who plays as a forward for NEC FC and the Uganda national football team.

== Early life ==
Basangwa was born on 17 December 2001 in Mulago Hospital in Uganda. He attended Namilyango Boys, Seeta High School and St Mary's secondary school, Kitende. During his school years, he participated in the Copa Coca-Cola tournament and the East African Secondary School Games (FEASSA).

== Club career ==
Basangwa began his youth career at St. Mary's Secondary School Kitende. He joined Uganda Premier League club Vipers SC in July 2020 and made his top-flight debut during the 2020–21 season, appearing in 12 league matches.

Basangwa was sent out on loan to fellow top-division club Gaddafi FC for the 2021–22 campaign, where he made 10 appearances and scored 3 goals. His loan deal was initially extended ahead of the following season.

== International carrier ==
In October 2022, Basangwa was transferred from vipers SC to Egyptian Second Division club Wadi Degla SC on a three-year contract. He featured for the Cairo-based team until January 2024, when his contract was terminated by mutual consent following a persistent injury.

In September 2024, Basangwa returned to Uganda and signed with Express FC. He featured for the Red Eagles until February 2026, when he left the club during the mid-season break.

In February 2026, top-flight side NEC FC officially announced the signing of Basangwa from Express FC.
