= 2023 FIFA U-20 World Cup squads =

FIFA championship roster

The 2023 FIFA U-20 World Cup was an international football tournament held in Argentina from 20 May to 11 June 2023. The 24 participating national teams were required to register a squad of 21 players, including at least three goalkeepers (Regulations Article 27.1). Only players in these squads were eligible to take part in the tournament. The tournament exclusively required players to be born between 1 January 2003 and 31 December 2007 to be eligible, that is, they had to be a maximum of 20 years old and at least 16 years old by the end of the calendar year in which the competition was played (Regulations Article 24.2).

Each participating national team had to submit a provisional list of a minimum of 35 and a maximum of 55 players (including at least four goalkeepers) to FIFA by the deadline stipulated by them (10 April 2023). The provisional lists were not published by FIFA and player changes were allowed only in exceptional cases (Regulations Article 25). The final list of 21 players per national team had to be submitted to FIFA by the deadline stipulated by them (10 May). All players in the final list had to be chosen from the respective provisional list. Players in the final squad could be replaced by a player from the preliminary squad due to serious injury or illness up to 24 hours prior to kickoff of the team's first match (Regulations Article 27).

FIFA published final lists of all teams on 12 May 2023.

The age listed for each player is on 20 May 2023, the first day of the tournament. The nationality for each club reflects the national association (not the league) to which the club is affiliated. A flag is included for coaches who are of a different nationality than their own national team. Player names marked in bold have been capped at full international level.

== Group A ==
=== Argentina ===
Argentina announced a provisional squad of 37 players on 18 April 2023. The final squad was then announced on 3 May 2023.

Head coach: Javier Mascherano

No.	Pos.	Player	Date of birth (age)	Club
1	GK	Federico Gomes Gerth	5 March 2004 (aged 19)	(Argentine Football Association) Tigre
2	DF	Lautaro Di Lollo	10 March 2004 (aged 19)	(Argentine Football Association) Boca Juniors
3	DF	**Valentín Barco**	23 July 2004 (aged 18)	(Argentine Football Association) Boca Juniors
4	DF	**Agustín Giay** (captain)	16 January 2004 (aged 19)	(Argentine Football Association) San Lorenzo
5	MF	Federico Redondo	18 January 2003 (aged 20)	(Argentine Football Association) Argentinos Juniors
6	DF	**Valentín Gómez**	26 June 2003 (aged 19)	(Argentine Football Association) Vélez Sarsfield
7	FW	Juan Gauto	2 June 2004 (aged 18)	(Argentine Football Association) Huracán
8	MF	**Máximo Perrone**	7 January 2003 (aged 20)	(The Football Association) Manchester City
9	FW	Alejo Véliz	19 September 2003 (aged 19)	(Argentine Football Association) Rosario Central
10	MF	**Valentín Carboni**	5 March 2005 (aged 18)	(Italian Football Federation) Inter Milan
11	FW	**Matías Soulé**	15 April 2003 (aged 20)	(Italian Football Federation) Juventus
12	GK	Lucas Lavagnino	22 August 2004 (aged 18)	(Argentine Football Association) River Plate
13	DF	Tomás Avilés	3 February 2004 (aged 19)	(Argentine Football Association) Racing
14	MF	Mateo Tanlongo	12 August 2003 (aged 19)	(Portuguese Football Federation) Sporting CP
15	DF	**Román Vega**	1 January 2004 (aged 19)	(Royal Spanish Football Federation) Barcelona
16	FW	Luka Romero	18 November 2004 (aged 18)	(Italian Football Federation) Lazio
17	GK	Nicolás Cláa	5 August 2004 (aged 18)	(Argentine Football Association) Lanús
18	FW	Brian Aguirre	6 January 2003 (aged 20)	(Argentine Football Association) Newell's Old Boys
19	MF	Gino Infantino	19 May 2003 (aged 20)	(Argentine Football Association) Rosario Central
20	MF	Ignacio Miramón	12 June 2003 (aged 19)	(Argentine Football Association) Gimnasia y Esgrima (LP)
21	FW	Ignacio Maestro Puch	13 August 2003 (aged 19)	(Argentine Football Association) Atlético Tucumán

=== Uzbekistan ===
Uzbekistan announced their final squad on 8 May 2023.

Head coach: Ravshan Khaydarov

No.	Pos.	Player	Date of birth (age)	Club
1	GK	Edem Nemanov	25 December 2003 (aged 19)	(Uzbekistan Football Association) Chigatoy
2	DF	Izzatillo Pulatov	15 June 2003 (aged 19)	(Uzbekistan Football Association) Metallurg Bekabad
3	DF	**Abdukodir Khusanov**	29 February 2004 (aged 19)	(Football Federation of Belarus) Energetik-BGU Minsk
4	DF	Abubakir Ashurov	12 June 2003 (aged 19)	(Uzbekistan Football Association) Pakhtakor Tashkent
5	FW	Rustam Turdimurodov	4 April 2004 (aged 19)	(Uzbekistan Football Association) Pakhtakor Tashkent
6	DF	**Jakhongir Urozov**	18 January 2004 (aged 19)	(Uzbekistan Football Association) Bunyodkor
7	FW	Pulatkhuzha Kholdorkhonov	6 July 2003 (aged 19)	(Uzbekistan Football Association) Pakhtakor Tashkent
8	MF	Bekhruz Askarov	8 March 2003 (aged 20)	(Uzbekistan Football Association) Pakhtakor Tashkent
9	FW	Shakhzod Nematjonov	6 August 2003 (aged 19)	(Uzbekistan Football Association) Metallurg Bekabad
10	MF	**Umarali Rakhmonaliev**	18 August 2003 (aged 19)	(Russian Football Union) Rubin Kazan
11	MF	**Sherzod Esanov**	1 February 2003 (aged 20)	(Uzbekistan Football Association) Andijon
12	GK	Asror Kenzhaev	15 July 2004 (aged 18)	(Uzbekistan Football Association) Neftchi Fergana
13	DF	**Zafarmurod Abdurakhmatov**	28 April 2003 (aged 20)	(Uzbekistan Football Association) Nasaf Qarshi
14	MF	**Abbosbek Fayzullaev**	3 October 2003 (aged 19)	(Uzbekistan Football Association) Pakhtakor Tashkent
15	DF	Diyor Ortikboev	6 January 2003 (aged 20)	(Uzbekistan Football Association) Pakhtakor Tashkent
16	MF	Shakhzod Rakhmatullaev	7 May 2003 (aged 20)	(Uzbekistan Football Association) Pakhtakor Tashkent
17	MF	Nodir Abdurazzakov	27 May 2004 (aged 18)	(Uzbekistan Football Association) AGMK Olmaliq
19	MF	Shakhzod Akromov	7 February 2004 (aged 19)	(Uzbekistan Football Association) Nasaf Qarshi
18	DF	Saidafzalkhon Akhrorov	20 January 2003 (aged 20)	(Uzbekistan Football Association) Turon Yaypan
20	DF	Makhmud Makhamadjonov	30 June 2003 (aged 19)	(Uzbekistan Football Association) Bunyodkor
21	GK	Otabek Boymurodov	5 June 2003 (aged 19)	(Uzbekistan Football Association) Pakhtakor Tashkent

=== Guatemala ===
Guatemala announced their final squad on 11 May 2023.

Head coach: (Mexico) Rafael Loredo

No.	Pos.	Player	Date of birth (age)	Club
1	GK	Fausto Delgado	17 September 2005 (aged 17)	(National Football Federation of Guatemala) Global Soccer Academy
2	DF	Randall Corado	1 September 2004 (aged 18)	(National Football Federation of Guatemala) Municipal
3	DF	Emerson Raymundo	21 July 2003 (aged 19)	(National Football Federation of Guatemala) Suchitepéquez
4	DF	Mathius Gaitán	31 January 2003 (aged 20)	(National Football Federation of Guatemala) Municipal
5	DF	Arián Recinos	3 February 2005 (aged 18)	(United States Soccer Federation) New York Red Bulls
6	MF	Carlos Santos	5 August 2003 (aged 19)	(National Football Federation of Guatemala) Iztapa
7	MF	Daniel Cardoza	15 March 2004 (aged 19)	(National Football Federation of Guatemala) Comunicaciones
8	MF	**Nestor Cabrera**	12 November 2003 (aged 19)	(United States Soccer Federation) Rutgers University
9	FW	Jefry Bantes	8 March 2004 (aged 19)	(National Football Federation of Guatemala) Municipal
10	FW	**Arquimides Ordóñez**	5 August 2003 (aged 19)	(United States Soccer Federation) FC Cincinnati
11	MF	**Rudy Muñoz**	6 February 2005 (aged 18)	(National Football Federation of Guatemala) Municipal
12	GK	Jorge Moreno	28 December 2004 (aged 18)	(National Football Federation of Guatemala) Comunicaciones
13	MF	Allan Juárez	2 February 2004 (aged 19)	(United States Soccer Federation) UC Berkeley
14	DF	**Jonathan Franco**	26 July 2003 (aged 19)	(National Football Federation of Guatemala) Municipal
15	DF	Andy Domínguez	18 February 2003 (aged 20)	(National Football Federation of Guatemala) Comunicaciones
16	DF	Jeshua Urizar	19 October 2004 (aged 18)	(National Football Federation of Guatemala) Mixco
17	MF	José Espinoza	10 September 2003 (aged 19)	(National Football Federation of Guatemala) Zacapa
18	MF	Edy Palencia	6 January 2004 (aged 19)	(National Football Federation of Guatemala) Comunicaciones
19	FW	Anderson Villagrán	10 May 2003 (aged 20)	(National Football Federation of Guatemala) Malacateco
20	DF	Figo Montaño	7 April 2004 (aged 19)	(National Football Federation of Guatemala) Municipal
21	GK	David Aldana	24 April 2003 (aged 20)	(National Football Federation of Guatemala) Municipal

=== New Zealand ===
New Zealand announced their final squad on 1 May 2023.

Head coach: Darren Bazeley

No.	Pos.	Player	Date of birth (age)	Club
1	GK	Kees Sims	27 March 2003 (aged 20)	(Swedish Football Association) Ljungskile SK
2	DF	Jackson Jarvie	1 May 2003 (aged 20)	(New Zealand Football) Eastern Suburbs
3	DF	Adam Supyk	21 February 2004 (aged 19)	(New Zealand Football) Eastern Suburbs
4	DF	Isaac Hughes	25 March 2004 (aged 19)	(New Zealand Football) Wellington Phoenix
5	DF	**Finn Surman**	23 September 2003 (aged 19)	(New Zealand Football) Wellington Phoenix
6	MF	Fin Roa Conchie	10 August 2003 (aged 19)	(New Zealand Football) Wellington Phoenix
7	MF	Noah Karunaratne	27 June 2003 (aged 19)	(New Zealand Football) Wellington Phoenix
8	MF	Jackson Manuel	24 February 2003 (aged 20)	(New Zealand Football) Western Springs
9	FW	Oliver Colloty	4 July 2003 (aged 19)	Unattached
10	MF	Jay Herdman	14 August 2004 (aged 18)	(Canadian Soccer Association) Vancouver Whitecaps FC
11	FW	Norman Garbett	27 February 2004 (aged 19)	(Italian Football Federation) Potenza
12	DF	Everton O'Leary	4 October 2004 (aged 18)	(New Zealand Football) Birkenhead United
13	GK	Henry Gray	29 March 2005 (aged 18)	Unattached
14	DF	Finn Linder	6 May 2004 (aged 19)	(Canadian Soccer Association) Vancouver Whitecaps FC
15	DF	Aaryan Raj	4 May 2003 (aged 20)	(New Zealand Football) Eastern Suburbs
16	MF	Dan McKay	27 November 2003 (aged 19)	(New Zealand Football) Wellington Phoenix
17	FW	Oliver Fay	16 July 2003 (aged 19)	(Swedish Football Association) Ljungskile SK
18	FW	Ben Wallace	26 March 2004 (aged 19)	(New Zealand Football) Wellington Phoenix
19	FW	Kian Donkers	12 September 2004 (aged 18)	(Royal Dutch Football Association) NEC
20	DF	**Lukas Kelly-Heald**	18 March 2005 (aged 18)	(New Zealand Football) Wellington Phoenix
21	GK	Alby Kelly-Heald	18 March 2005 (aged 18)	(New Zealand Football) Wellington Phoenix

== Group B ==
=== United States ===
The United States announced their final squad on 10 May 2023. Mauricio Cuevas withdrew injured and was replaced by Michael Halliday on 18 May.

Head coach: Mikey Varas

No.	Pos.	Player	Date of birth (age)	Club
1	GK	**Gabriel Slonina**	15 May 2004 (aged 19)	(The Football Association) Chelsea
2	DF	Michael Halliday	22 January 2003 (aged 20)	(United States Soccer Federation) Orlando City SC
3	DF	**Caleb Wiley**	22 December 2004 (aged 18)	(United States Soccer Federation) Atlanta United FC
4	DF	Joshua Wynder	2 May 2005 (aged 18)	(United States Soccer Federation) Louisville City FC
5	DF	Brandan Craig	7 April 2004 (aged 19)	(United States Soccer Federation) Philadelphia Union
6	MF	Daniel Edelman (captain)	28 April 2003 (aged 20)	(United States Soccer Federation) New York Red Bulls
7	FW	**Quinn Sullivan**	27 March 2004 (aged 19)	(United States Soccer Federation) Philadelphia Union
8	MF	**Jack McGlynn**	7 July 2003 (aged 19)	(United States Soccer Federation) Philadelphia Union
9	FW	**Cade Cowell**	14 October 2003 (aged 19)	(United States Soccer Federation) San Jose Earthquakes
10	MF	**Diego Luna**	7 September 2003 (aged 19)	(United States Soccer Federation) Real Salt Lake
11	FW	**Kevin Paredes**	7 May 2003 (aged 20)	(German Football Association) VfL Wolfsburg
12	GK	Antonio Carrera	15 March 2004 (aged 19)	(United States Soccer Federation) FC Dallas
13	DF	**Jonathan Gómez**	1 September 2003 (aged 19)	(Royal Spanish Football Federation) Real Sociedad
14	DF	Marcus Ferkranus	10 May 2003 (aged 20)	(United States Soccer Federation) LA Galaxy
15	MF	Niko Tsakiris	19 June 2005 (aged 17)	(United States Soccer Federation) San Jose Earthquakes
16	MF	Owen Wolff	30 December 2004 (aged 18)	(United States Soccer Federation) Austin FC
17	DF	Justin Che	18 November 2003 (aged 19)	(German Football Association) 1899 Hoffenheim
18	MF	**Obed Vargas**	5 August 2005 (aged 17)	(United States Soccer Federation) Seattle Sounders FC
19	FW	Darren Yapi	19 November 2004 (aged 18)	(United States Soccer Federation) Colorado Rapids
20	MF	Rokas Pukštas	25 August 2004 (aged 18)	(Croatian Football Federation) Hajduk Split
21	GK	Alex Borto	6 November 2003 (aged 19)	(The Football Association) Fulham

=== Ecuador ===
Ecuador announced their final squad on 9 May 2023.

Head coach: Miguel Bravo

No.	Pos.	Player	Date of birth (age)	Club
1	GK	Cristhian Loor	9 March 2006 (aged 17)	(Ecuadorian Football Federation) Independiente del Valle
2	DF	Stalin Valencia	10 October 2003 (aged 19)	(Mexican Football Federation) UNAM
3	DF	Christian García	6 July 2004 (aged 18)	(Royal Spanish Football Federation) Leganés
4	DF	**Joel Ordóñez**	21 April 2004 (aged 19)	(Royal Belgian Football Association) Club Brugge
5	MF	**Óscar Zambrano**	20 April 2004 (aged 19)	(Ecuadorian Football Federation) LDU Quito
6	DF	Yeltzin Erique	27 March 2003 (aged 20)	(Ecuadorian Football Federation) LDU Quito
7	FW	**Alan Minda**	14 May 2003 (aged 20)	(Ecuadorian Football Federation) Independiente del Valle
8	MF	Sebastián González	6 June 2003 (aged 19)	(Ecuadorian Football Federation) LDU Quito
9	FW	Justin Cuero	18 March 2004 (aged 19)	(Ecuadorian Football Federation) Independiente del Valle
10	MF	**Nilson Angulo**	19 June 2003 (aged 19)	(Royal Belgian Football Association) Anderlecht
11	FW	Cristhoper Zambrano	5 July 2004 (aged 18)	(Ecuadorian Football Federation) Aucas
12	GK	Gilmar Napa	5 January 2003 (aged 20)	(Ecuadorian Football Federation) Emelec
13	DF	Daniel de la Cruz	6 March 2004 (aged 19)	(Ecuadorian Football Federation) LDU Quito
14	FW	Ariel Mina	22 April 2003 (aged 20)	(Ecuadorian Football Federation) LDU Quito
15	MF	**Denil Castillo**	24 March 2004 (aged 19)	(Ecuadorian Football Federation) LDU Quito
16	DF	Maiky de la Cruz	13 August 2004 (aged 18)	(French Football Federation) Reims
17	FW	Maelo Rentería	13 February 2004 (aged 19)	(Ecuadorian Football Federation) Independiente del Valle
18	MF	Tommy Chamba	23 October 2004 (aged 18)	(Ecuadorian Football Federation) Emelec
19	MF	**Kendry Páez**	4 May 2007 (aged 16)	(Ecuadorian Football Federation) Independiente del Valle
20	GK	Tony Jiménez	10 October 2003 (aged 19)	(Ecuadorian Football Federation) Guayaquil City
21	FW	José Klinger	10 March 2005 (aged 18)	(Ecuadorian Football Federation) Independiente del Valle

=== Fiji ===
Fiji announced their final squad on 10 May 2023.

Head coach: (England) Bobby Mimms

No.	Pos.	Player	Date of birth (age)	Club
1	GK	Aydin Mustahib	28 May 2004 (aged 18)	(New Zealand Football) Auckland United
2	DF	Peter Ravai	25 March 2003 (aged 20)	(Fiji Football Association) Rewa
3	MF	Eneriko Matau	10 January 2004 (aged 19)	(Fiji Football Association) Nadi
4	MF	Abdullah Aiyas	26 September 2003 (aged 19)	(Football Australia) Bonnyrigg White Eagles
5	DF	Sakiusa Saqiri	11 June 2003 (aged 19)	(Fiji Football Association) Tavua
6	MF	**Thomas Dunn**	19 January 2003 (aged 20)	(Fiji Football Association) Navua
7	DF	Arshad Khan	22 August 2005 (aged 17)	(Football Australia) Macarthur Rams
8	DF	Joshua Laqeretabua	26 September 2005 (aged 17)	(The Football Association) Charlton Athletic
9	FW	Faazil Ali	8 May 2003 (aged 20)	(Fiji Football Association) Ba
10	MF	**Nabil Begg**	17 March 2004 (aged 19)	(Fiji Football Association) Ba
11	MF	Gulam Razool	29 January 2004 (aged 19)	(Fiji Football Association) Ba
12	MF	Clarence Hussain	4 July 2003 (aged 19)	(Fiji Football Association) Labasa
13	GK	Joji Vuakaca	24 March 2003 (aged 20)	(Fiji Football Association) Labasa
14	FW	Apisai Rabuka	23 October 2004 (aged 18)	(New Zealand Football) Coastal Spirit
15	MF	Sailasa Ratu	3 February 2004 (aged 19)	(Fiji Football Association) Tavua
16	DF	Geary Gubu	28 April 2003 (aged 20)	(Fiji Football Association) Tailevu Naitasiri
17	DF	Mohammed Fataul	10 August 2003 (aged 19)	(Fiji Football Association) Ba
18	DF	Samuela Navoce	22 July 2003 (aged 19)	(Fiji Football Association) Ba
19	FW	Junior Dekedeke	25 March 2003 (aged 20)	(Fiji Football Association) Lautoka
20	GK	Isikeli Sevenaia	11 January 2003 (aged 20)	(Fiji Football Association) Nadroga
21	FW	**Sterling Vasconcellos**	19 April 2005 (aged 18)	(Fiji Football Association) Lautoka

=== Slovakia ===
Slovakia announced a provisional squad of 48 players on 2 May 2023. The final squad was announced on 11 May. On 15 May, Bálint Csóka replaced Dominik Hollý, who had withdrawn due to an injury.

Head coach: Albert Rusnák

No.	Pos.	Player	Date of birth (age)	Club
1	GK	Samuel Belaník	26 August 2003 (aged 19)	(Slovak Football Association) Žilina
2	DF	Šimon Mičuda	28 January 2004 (aged 19)	(Slovak Football Association) Trenčín
3	DF	Samuel Bagín	8 February 2004 (aged 19)	(Slovak Football Association) Trenčín
4	MF	Ján Murgaš	27 March 2004 (aged 19)	(Austrian Football Association) Traiskirchen
5	DF	Dávid Ovšonka	17 January 2004 (aged 19)	(Slovak Football Association) Železiarne Podbrezová
6	DF	**Sebastian Kóša**	13 September 2003 (aged 19)	(Slovak Football Association) Spartak Trnava
7	FW	Bálint Csóka	20 March 2003 (aged 20)	(Slovak Football Association) Šamorín
8	MF	**Artur Gajdoš**	20 January 2004 (aged 19)	(Slovak Football Association) Trenčín
9	FW	Adam Griger	16 March 2004 (aged 19)	(Italian Football Federation) Cagliari
10	FW	Timotej Jambor	4 April 2003 (aged 20)	(Slovak Football Association) Žilina
11	FW	Adam Gaži	1 March 2003 (aged 20)	(Slovak Football Association) Tatran Liptovský Mikuláš
12	GK	Adam Hrdina	12 February 2004 (aged 19)	(Slovak Football Association) Slovan Bratislava
13	DF	Marek Ujlaky	3 December 2003 (aged 19)	(Slovak Football Association) Spartak Trnava
14	MF	Máté Szolgai	27 July 2003 (aged 19)	(Slovak Football Association) Šamorín
15	FW	Nino Marcelli	29 May 2005 (aged 17)	(Slovak Football Association) Slovan Bratislava
16	FW	**Leo Sauer**	16 December 2005 (aged 17)	(Royal Dutch Football Association) Feyenoord
17	MF	Dominik Šnajder	22 July 2003 (aged 19)	(Slovak Football Association) Žilina
18	DF	Nicolas Šikula	15 May 2003 (aged 20)	(Slovak Football Association) Železiarne Podbrezová
19	DF	Samuel Kopásek	22 May 2003 (aged 19)	(Slovak Football Association) Žilina
20	MF	**Mário Sauer**	15 May 2004 (aged 19)	(Slovak Football Association) Žilina
21	GK	Adam Danko	27 June 2003 (aged 19)	(Slovak Football Association) Pohronie

== Group C ==
=== Senegal ===
Senegal announced their final squad on 10 May 2023. On 22 May, N'Diack Sall replaced Landing Badji, who had withdrawn due to an injury.

Head coach: Malick Daf

No.	Pos.	Player	Date of birth (age)	Club
1	GK	Alioune Niang	1 January 2003 (aged 20)	(Senegalese Football Federation) Linguère
2	MF	Mouhamed Guèye II	16 November 2003 (aged 19)	(Senegalese Football Federation) Gorée
3	MF	Djibril Diarra	30 April 2004 (aged 19)	(Senegalese Football Federation) Génération Foot
4	MF	**Mamadou Camara**	5 January 2003 (aged 20)	(Royal Moroccan Football Federation) RS Berkane
5	MF	Ibrahima Seck	19 May 2004 (aged 19)	(Senegalese Football Federation) Gorée
6	DF	Souleymane Basse	6 November 2003 (aged 19)	(Senegalese Football Federation) Génération Foot
7	FW	Oumar Diouf	15 May 2003 (aged 20)	(Senegalese Football Federation) Darou Salam
8	DF	Amidou Diop	8 March 2004 (aged 19)	(Senegalese Football Federation) Génération Foot
9	FW	**Souleymane Faye**	8 February 2003 (aged 20)	(Royal Spanish Football Federation) Talavera de la Reina
10	FW	**Samba Diallo**	5 January 2003 (aged 20)	(Ukrainian Association of Football) Dynamo Kyiv
11	MF	Mamadou Gning	22 December 2006 (aged 16)	(Senegalese Football Federation) Espoirs de Guédiawaye
12	DF	Babacar N'Diaye	25 October 2004 (aged 18)	(Senegalese Football Federation) Douanes
13	DF	**Seydou Sano**	28 October 2004 (aged 18)	(Senegalese Football Federation) Gorée
14	FW	Libasse Ngom	4 December 2003 (aged 19)	(Senegalese Football Federation) Guédiawaye
15	MF	Ibrahima Cissoko	18 April 2003 (aged 20)	(Senegalese Football Federation) Gorée
16	GK	Mamour Ndiaye	22 October 2005 (aged 17)	(Senegalese Football Federation) Oslo FA
17	FW	Mame Mor Faye	12 July 2005 (aged 17)	(Senegalese Football Federation) Darou Salam
18	DF	Mouhamed Guèye I	15 October 2003 (aged 19)	(Senegalese Football Federation) Diambars
19	DF	Mapenda M'Bow	20 July 2004 (aged 18)	(Senegalese Football Federation) Espoirs de Guédiawaye
20	MF	**Pape Diop**	4 September 2003 (aged 19)	(Royal Belgian Football Association) Zulte Waregem
21	GK	N'Diack Sall	28 July 2003 (aged 19)	(Senegalese Football Federation) Espoirs de Guédiawaye

=== Japan ===
Japan announced their final squad on 9 May 2023.

Head coach: Koichi Togashi

No.	Pos.	Player	Date of birth (age)	Club
1	GK	Ryoya Kimura	10 June 2003 (aged 19)	(Japan Football Association) Nihon University
2	DF	Hayate Matsuda	2 October 2003 (aged 19)	(Japan Football Association) Mito HollyHock
3	DF	Hayato Tanaka	1 November 2003 (aged 19)	(Japan Football Association) Kashiwa Reysol
4	DF	Shūta Kikuchi	16 August 2003 (aged 19)	(Japan Football Association) Shimizu S-Pulse
5	MF	Riku Yamane	17 August 2003 (aged 19)	(Japan Football Association) Yokohama F. Marinos
6	MF	Taichi Fukui	15 July 2004 (aged 18)	(German Football Association) Bayern Munich
7	MF	Kuryu Matsuki	30 April 2003 (aged 20)	(Japan Football Association) FC Tokyo
8	MF	**Kodai Sano**	25 September 2003 (aged 19)	(Japan Football Association) Fagiano Okayama
9	FW	Shiō Fukuda	8 April 2004 (aged 19)	(German Football Association) Borussia Mönchengladbach
10	MF	**Sōta Kitano**	13 August 2004 (aged 18)	(Japan Football Association) Cerezo Osaka
11	FW	Isa Sakamoto	26 August 2003 (aged 19)	(Japan Football Association) Fagiano Okayama
12	GK	Yu Kanoshima	5 May 2003 (aged 20)	(Japan Football Association) Ryutsu Keizai University
13	DF	Anrie Chase	24 March 2004 (aged 19)	(German Football Association) VfB Stuttgart
14	MF	Takatora Einaga	7 April 2003 (aged 20)	(Japan Football Association) Kawasaki Frontale
15	DF	Yūsei Yashiki	18 October 2003 (aged 19)	(Japan Football Association) Oita Trinita
16	DF	Niko Takahashi	17 August 2005 (aged 17)	(Royal Spanish Football Federation) Barcelona
17	MF	Kosuke Matsumura	2 May 2004 (aged 19)	(Japan Football Association) Hosei University
18	FW	Naoki Kumata	2 August 2004 (aged 18)	(Japan Football Association) FC Tokyo
19	DF	**Kōta Takai**	4 September 2004 (aged 18)	(Japan Football Association) Kawasaki Frontale
20	MF	Taisei Abe	7 June 2004 (aged 18)	(Japan Football Association) V-Varen Nagasaki
21	GK	Ryusei Haruna	1 May 2004 (aged 19)	(Japan Football Association) Mito HollyHock

=== Israel ===
Israel announced their final squad on 7 May 2023. Goalkeeper Nitai Greis replaced goalkeeper Lior Gliklich, who had withdrawn due to an injury.

Head coach: Ofir Haim

No.	Pos.	Player	Date of birth (age)	Club
1	GK	Tomer Tzarfati	16 October 2003 (aged 19)	(Israel Football Association) Maccabi Netanya
2	DF	**Ilay Feingold**	23 August 2004 (aged 18)	(Israel Football Association) Maccabi Haifa
3	DF	Or Israelov	2 September 2004 (aged 18)	(Israel Football Association) Hapoel Tel Aviv
4	DF	**Stav Lemkin**	2 April 2003 (aged 20)	(Israel Football Association) Hapoel Tel Aviv
5	DF	Shon Edri	24 October 2003 (aged 19)	(Israel Football Association) Hapoel Ashdod
6	MF	El-Yam Kancepolsky	22 December 2003 (aged 19)	(Israel Football Association) Hapoel Tel Aviv
7	FW	**Anan Khalaily**	3 September 2004 (aged 18)	(Israel Football Association) Maccabi Haifa
8	MF	Ilay Madmon (captain)	23 February 2003 (aged 20)	(Israel Football Association) Beitar Jerusalem
9	FW	**Dor Turgeman**	24 October 2003 (aged 19)	(Israel Football Association) Maccabi Tel Aviv
10	FW	Ariel Lugassy	24 November 2004 (aged 18)	(Israel Football Association) Maccabi Petah Tikva
11	FW	Hamza Shibli	19 August 2004 (aged 18)	(Israel Football Association) Maccabi Haifa
12	DF	**Roy Revivo**	22 May 2003 (aged 19)	(Israel Football Association) Hapoel Jerusalem
13	DF	Noam Ben Harush	13 May 2005 (aged 18)	(Israel Football Association) Hapoel Haifa
14	MF	Roy Navi	3 April 2004 (aged 19)	(Israel Football Association) Maccabi Tel Aviv
15	MF	**Tai Abed**	8 March 2004 (aged 19)	(Royal Dutch Football Association) PSV Eindhoven
16	MF	Ran Binyamin	6 February 2004 (aged 19)	(Israel Football Association) Hapoel Tel Aviv
17	FW	Omer Senior	23 February 2003 (aged 20)	(Israel Football Association) Hapoel Tel Aviv
18	GK	Ofek Melika	23 January 2005 (aged 18)	(Israel Football Association) Hapoel Ra'anana
19	DF	Hadar Fuchs	13 December 2003 (aged 19)	(Israel Football Association) Maccabi Petah Tikva
20	FW	Ahmad Ibrahim Salman	21 March 2004 (aged 19)	(Israel Football Association) Maccabi Netanya
21	GK	Nitai Greis	8 July 2004 (aged 18)	(Israel Football Association) Maccabi Haifa

=== Colombia ===
Colombia announced their squad on 9 May 2023.

Head coach: Héctor Cárdenas

No.	Pos.	Player	Date of birth (age)	Club
1	GK	Luis Marquinez	10 April 2003 (aged 20)	(Colombian Football Federation) Atlético Nacional
2	DF	Daniel Pedrozo	19 March 2004 (aged 19)	(Colombian Football Federation) Real Cartagena
3	DF	Édier Ocampo	3 October 2003 (aged 19)	(Colombian Football Federation) Atlético Nacional
4	DF	Fernando Álvarez	24 August 2003 (aged 19)	(Mexican Football Federation) Pachuca
5	DF	Kevin Mantilla	22 May 2003 (aged 19)	(Colombian Football Federation) Independiente Santa Fe
6	MF	Jhon Vélez	25 July 2003 (aged 19)	(Colombian Football Federation) Junior
7	FW	Jorge Cabezas Hurtado	6 September 2003 (aged 19)	(Colombian Football Federation) Independiente Medellín
8	MF	**Gustavo Puerta**	23 July 2003 (aged 19)	(German Football Association) 1. FC Nürnberg
9	FW	Tomás Ángel	20 February 2003 (aged 20)	(Colombian Football Federation) Atlético Nacional
10	MF	**Yáser Asprilla**	19 November 2003 (aged 19)	(The Football Association) Watford
11	MF	Alexis Manyoma	30 January 2003 (aged 20)	(Colombian Football Federation) Cortuluá
12	GK	Juan Diego Castillo	13 January 2003 (aged 20)	(Colombian Football Federation) Fortaleza
13	MF	Juan Castilla	27 July 2004 (aged 18)	(United States Soccer Federation) Houston Dynamo FC
14	DF	Julián Palacios	7 August 2003 (aged 19)	(Colombian Football Federation) Envigado
15	DF	**Devan Tanton**	3 January 2004 (aged 19)	(The Football Association) Fulham
16	FW	**Óscar Cortés**	3 December 2003 (aged 19)	(Colombian Football Federation) Millonarios
17	DF	**Andrés Salazar**	15 January 2003 (aged 20)	(Colombian Football Federation) Atlético Nacional
18	MF	Jhojan Torres	12 January 2003 (aged 20)	(Colombian Football Federation) Independiente Santa Fe
19	MF	Miguel Monsalve	27 February 2004 (aged 19)	(Colombian Football Federation) Independiente Medellín
20	MF	Daniel Luna	7 May 2003 (aged 20)	(Royal Spanish Football Federation) Mallorca
21	GK	Alexéi Rojas	28 September 2005 (aged 17)	(The Football Association) Arsenal

== Group D ==
=== Italy ===
Italy announced their squad on 11 May 2023.

Head coach: Carmine Nunziata

No.	Pos.	Player	Date of birth (age)	Club
1	GK	Sebastiano Desplanches	11 March 2003 (aged 20)	(Italian Football Federation) Trento
2	DF	Mattia Zanotti	11 February 2003 (aged 20)	(Italian Football Federation) Inter Milan
3	DF	Riccardo Turicchia	5 February 2003 (aged 20)	(Italian Football Federation) Juventus
4	MF	Matteo Prati	28 December 2003 (aged 19)	(Italian Football Federation) SPAL
5	DF	Daniele Ghilardi	6 January 2003 (aged 20)	(Italian Football Federation) Mantova
6	DF	Samuel Giovane (captain)	28 March 2003 (aged 20)	(Italian Football Federation) Ascoli
7	MF	**Niccolò Pisilli**	23 September 2004 (aged 18)	(Italian Football Federation) Roma
8	MF	Cesare Casadei	10 January 2003 (aged 20)	(The Football Association) Reading
9	FW	Giuseppe Ambrosino	10 September 2003 (aged 19)	(Italian Football Federation) Cittadella
10	MF	Tommaso Baldanzi	23 March 2003 (aged 20)	(Italian Football Federation) Empoli
11	FW	Daniele Montevago	18 March 2003 (aged 20)	(Italian Football Federation) Sampdoria
12	GK	Gioele Zacchi	10 July 2003 (aged 19)	(Italian Football Federation) Sassuolo
13	DF	Filippo Fiumanò	23 February 2003 (aged 20)	(Italian Football Federation) Aquila Montevarchi
14	DF	Gabriele Guarino	14 April 2004 (aged 19)	(Italian Football Federation) Empoli
15	DF	Alessandro Fontanarosa	7 February 2003 (aged 20)	(Italian Football Federation) Inter Milan
16	MF	**Giacomo Faticanti**	31 July 2004 (aged 18)	(Italian Football Federation) Roma
17	MF	**Luca Lipani**	18 May 2005 (aged 18)	(Italian Football Federation) Genoa
18	FW	**Pio Esposito**	28 June 2005 (aged 17)	(Italian Football Federation) Inter Milan
19	MF	Duccio Degli Innocenti	28 April 2003 (aged 20)	(Italian Football Federation) Empoli
20	FW	**Simone Pafundi**	14 March 2006 (aged 17)	(Italian Football Federation) Udinese
21	GK	Jacopo Sassi	24 July 2003 (aged 19)	(Italian Football Federation) Giugliano

=== Brazil ===
Brazil announced their final squad on 28 April 2023. On 3 May, Jean Pedroso replaced Kaiky, who had withdrawn due to an injury. On 7 May, Corinthians forward Pedrinho was replaced by Marquinhos because his club decided not to release him. On 11 May, defender Michel was ruled out due to an injury, and one day later was replaced by Douglas Mendes.

Head coach: Ramon Menezes

No.	Pos.	Player	Date of birth (age)	Club
1	GK	Mycael	12 March 2004 (aged 19)	(Brazilian Football Confederation) Athletico Paranaense
2	DF	**Arthur**	17 March 2003 (aged 20)	(Brazilian Football Confederation) América Mineiro
3	DF	Jean Pedroso	28 January 2004 (aged 19)	(Brazilian Football Confederation) Coritiba
4	DF	Robert Renan	11 October 2003 (aged 19)	(Russian Football Union) Zenit Saint Petersburg
5	MF	**Andrey Santos** (captain)	3 May 2004 (aged 19)	(Brazilian Football Confederation) Vasco da Gama
6	DF	**Kaiki Bruno**	8 March 2003 (aged 20)	(Brazilian Football Confederation) Cruzeiro
7	FW	Giovani	1 January 2004 (aged 19)	(Brazilian Football Confederation) Palmeiras
8	MF	**Marlon Gomes**	14 December 2003 (aged 19)	(Brazilian Football Confederation) Vasco da Gama
9	FW	Marcos Leonardo	2 May 2003 (aged 20)	(Brazilian Football Confederation) Santos
10	MF	Matheus Martins	16 July 2003 (aged 19)	(The Football Association) Watford
11	MF	Guilherme Biro	20 April 2004 (aged 19)	(Brazilian Football Confederation) Corinthians
12	GK	Kaique	16 April 2003 (aged 20)	(Brazilian Football Confederation) Palmeiras
13	DF	André Dhominique	7 October 2003 (aged 19)	(Brazilian Football Confederation) Bahia
14	DF	Douglas Mendes	13 June 2004 (aged 18)	(Austrian Football Association) Red Bull Salzburg
15	MF	Ronald	11 February 2003 (aged 20)	(Brazilian Football Confederation) Grêmio
16	FW	Marquinhos	7 April 2003 (aged 20)	(The Football Association) Norwich City
17	FW	Giovane	24 November 2003 (aged 19)	(Brazilian Football Confederation) Corinthians
18	FW	Kevin	4 January 2003 (aged 20)	(Brazilian Football Confederation) Palmeiras
19	FW	Matheus Nascimento	3 March 2004 (aged 19)	(Brazilian Football Confederation) Botafogo
20	FW	**Savinho**	10 April 2004 (aged 19)	(Royal Dutch Football Association) PSV Eindhoven
21	GK	Kauã Santos	11 April 2003 (aged 20)	(Brazilian Football Confederation) Flamengo

=== Nigeria ===
Nigeria submitted a provisional squad of 55 players. The final squad was announced on 8 May 2023. On 9 May, goalkeeper Saheed Jimoh was replaced by John Utoblo.

Head coach: Ladan Bosso

No.	Pos.	Player	Date of birth (age)	Club
1	GK	**Nathaniel Nwosu**	10 January 2006 (aged 17)	(Nigeria Football Federation) Water
2	DF	Augustine Njoku	2 August 2004 (aged 18)	(Nigeria Football Federation) Abia Warriors
3	DF	Solomon Agbalaka	9 November 2003 (aged 19)	(Nigeria Football Federation) Broad City
4	MF	Daniel Daga	10 January 2007 (aged 16)	(Nigeria Football Federation) Dakkada
5	DF	Abel Ogwuche	6 July 2003 (aged 19)	(Swedish Football Association) Trelleborgs FF
6	DF	**Daniel Bameyi** (captain)	4 January 2006 (aged 17)	(Nigeria Football Federation) Yum Yum
7	FW	Rilwanu Sarki	2 February 2004 (aged 19)	(Nigeria Football Federation) Mahanaim
8	MF	Tochukwu Nnadi	30 June 2003 (aged 19)	(Bulgarian Football Union) Botev Plovdiv
9	FW	Salim Lawal	15 January 2003 (aged 20)	(Nigeria Football Federation) Mavlon
10	MF	Victor Eletu	1 April 2005 (aged 18)	(Italian Football Federation) AC Milan
11	FW	Ibrahim Beji Muhammad	3 February 2004 (aged 19)	(Royal Spanish Football Federation) Cartagena
12	DF	Benjamin Fredrick	28 May 2005 (aged 17)	(Nigeria Football Federation) Nasarawa United
13	DF	Israel Domingo	9 February 2004 (aged 19)	(Nigeria Football Federation) Family Worship Centre
14	MF	Ibrahim Abdullahi	27 October 2005 (aged 17)	(Nigeria Football Federation) Samba
15	FW	Jude Sunday	4 October 2004 (aged 18)	(Nigeria Football Federation) Real Sapphire
16	GK	John Utoblo	5 July 2003 (aged 19)	(Nigeria Football Federation) Mavlon
17	FW	Kehinde Ibrahim	15 January 2006 (aged 17)	(Nigeria Football Federation) Green Light Academy
18	MF	Samson Lawal	25 April 2004 (aged 19)	(Nigeria Football Federation) Katsina United
19	FW	Umeh Emmanuel	31 August 2004 (aged 18)	(Bulgarian Football Union) Botev Plovdiv
20	MF	John Joshua	18 January 2004 (aged 19)	(Nigeria Football Federation) Nasarawa United
21	GK	Chijoke Aniagboso	15 April 2004 (aged 19)	(Nigeria Football Federation) Giant Brillars

=== Dominican Republic ===
Dominican Republic announced their final squad on 8 May 2023.

Head coach: (Cuba) Walter Benítez

No.	Pos.	Player	Date of birth (age)	Club
1	GK	Omry Bello	28 May 2003 (aged 19)	(Dominican Football Federation) O&M
2	MF	Steven Martínez	10 September 2003 (aged 19)	(Dominican Football Federation) Atlético Vega Real
3	DF	Alex Ciriaco	21 March 2004 (aged 19)	(Football Association of Finland) Ilves
4	DF	Sebastián Mañón	13 February 2003 (aged 20)	(United States Soccer Federation) Dartmouth College
5	DF	Kleffer Martes	13 January 2003 (aged 20)	(Dominican Football Federation) Atlético Pantoja
6	DF	Israel Boatwright	2 June 2005 (aged 17)	(United States Soccer Federation) Inter Miami CF
7	FW	Bryan More	29 May 2003 (aged 19)	(Dominican Football Federation) Atlético Vega Real
8	MF	**Ángel Montes de Oca**	18 February 2003 (aged 20)	(Dominican Football Federation) Cibao
9	FW	Anyelo Gómez	2 January 2003 (aged 20)	(Dominican Football Federation) Jarabacoa
10	MF	**Edison Azcona**	21 November 2003 (aged 19)	(United States Soccer Federation) Inter Miami CF
11	FW	Alejandro Martín	16 February 2006 (aged 17)	(Royal Spanish Football Federation) Rayo Ciudad Alcobendas
12	GK	**Xavier Valdez**	23 November 2003 (aged 19)	(United States Soccer Federation) Houston Dynamo FC
13	FW	Oliver Schmidhauser	2 June 2004 (aged 18)	(German Football Association) RB Leipzig
14	MF	Yordy Álvarez	3 December 2005 (aged 17)	(Dominican Football Federation) Atlántico
15	FW	Yunior Peralta	2 February 2004 (aged 19)	(Dominican Football Federation) Cibao
16	DF	Miguel Vásquez	26 February 2004 (aged 19)	(Dominican Football Federation) Atlántico
17	FW	Jason Yambatis	21 March 2003 (aged 20)	(Dominican Football Federation) Atlético Pantoja
18	DF	Alfeni Tamárez	14 June 2005 (aged 17)	(Dominican Football Federation) Atlético Pantoja
19	DF	**Guillermo de Peña**	22 July 2003 (aged 19)	(Dominican Football Federation) Moca
20	GK	Enrique Bösl	7 February 2004 (aged 19)	(German Football Association) Ingolstadt 04
21	FW	Derek Cuevas	7 January 2004 (aged 19)	(Royal Spanish Football Federation) Barcelona

== Group E ==
=== Uruguay ===
Uruguay submitted a provisional squad of 45 players. The final squad was announced on 8 May 2023.

Head coach: Marcelo Broli

No.	Pos.	Player	Date of birth (age)	Club
1	GK	Facundo Machado	19 January 2004 (aged 19)	(Uruguayan Football Association) Nacional
2	DF	Sebastián Boselli	4 December 2003 (aged 19)	(Uruguayan Football Association) Defensor Sporting
3	DF	Mateo Antoni	22 April 2003 (aged 20)	(Uruguayan Football Association) Liverpool
4	DF	Mateo Ponte	24 May 2003 (aged 19)	(Uruguayan Football Association) Danubio
5	MF	Fabricio Díaz (captain)	3 February 2003 (aged 20)	(Uruguayan Football Association) Liverpool
6	DF	Mathías De Ritis	31 January 2003 (aged 20)	(Uruguayan Football Association) Peñarol
7	FW	Anderson Duarte	23 March 2004 (aged 19)	(Uruguayan Football Association) Defensor Sporting
8	MF	Rodrigo Chagas	20 August 2003 (aged 19)	(Uruguayan Football Association) Nacional
9	FW	Andrés Ferrari	3 January 2003 (aged 20)	(Uruguayan Football Association) Defensor Sporting
10	MF	Franco González	22 June 2004 (aged 18)	(Uruguayan Football Association) Danubio
11	FW	Juan Cruz de los Santos	22 February 2003 (aged 20)	(Uruguayan Football Association) River Plate
12	GK	Randall Rodríguez	29 November 2003 (aged 19)	(Uruguayan Football Association) Peñarol
13	DF	Alan Matturro	11 October 2004 (aged 18)	(Italian Football Federation) Genoa
14	MF	Damián García	15 July 2003 (aged 19)	(Uruguayan Football Association) Peñarol
15	MF	Ignacio Sosa	31 August 2003 (aged 19)	(Uruguayan Football Association) Fénix
16	DF	Facundo González	6 July 2003 (aged 19)	(Royal Spanish Football Federation) Valencia
17	MF	Matías Abaldo	2 April 2004 (aged 19)	(Uruguayan Football Association) Defensor Sporting
18	MF	Santiago Homenchenko	30 August 2003 (aged 19)	(Uruguayan Football Association) Peñarol
19	FW	**Luciano Rodríguez**	16 July 2003 (aged 19)	(Uruguayan Football Association) Liverpool
20	FW	Nicolás Siri	17 April 2004 (aged 19)	(Uruguayan Football Association) Montevideo City
21	GK	José Arbío	21 January 2003 (aged 20)	(Uruguayan Football Association) River Plate

=== Iraq ===
Head coach: Emad Mohammed

The preliminary squad containing 51 players was submitted on 23 April 2023. Iraq announced the final squad on 10 May. On 16 May, Abboud Rabah was replaced by Abbas Majed, while Sajjad Fadhil and Mohammed Emad Mohammed were announced as standby players to replace any players in the squad that cannot participate.

No.	Pos.	Player	Date of birth (age)	Club
1	GK	Hussein Hassan	5 October 2003 (aged 19)	(Iraq Football Association) Al-Karkh
2	DF	**Alai Ghasem**	16 February 2003 (aged 20)	(Swedish Football Association) IFK Göteborg
3	DF	Roman Doulashi	7 August 2005 (aged 17)	(German Football Association) Bonner SC
4	DF	Kadhim Raad	5 March 2003 (aged 20)	(Iraq Football Association) Al-Quwa Al-Jawiya
5	MF	Abdulrazzaq Qasim (captain)	19 February 2003 (aged 20)	(Iraq Football Association) Al-Shorta
6	DF	Adam Rasheed	10 July 2006 (aged 16)	(Danish Football Association) AaB
7	FW	Mohammed Jameel	25 November 2005 (aged 17)	(Iraq Football Association) Al-Sinaat Al-Kahrabaiya
8	FW	Abdul-Qader Ayoub	23 July 2003 (aged 19)	(Iraq Football Association) Erbil
9	MF	**Alexander Aoraha**	17 January 2003 (aged 20)	(The Football Association) Queens Park Rangers
10	FW	**Youssef Amyn**	21 August 2003 (aged 19)	(Royal Dutch Football Association) Feyenoord
11	FW	Ashar Ali	24 September 2003 (aged 19)	(Iraq Football Association) Al-Mina'a
12	GK	Abbas Kareem	15 November 2003 (aged 19)	(Iraq Football Association) Al-Shorta
13	GK	Omran Zaki	2 August 2004 (aged 18)	(Iraq Football Association) Zakho
14	FW	Abbas Fadhil	13 July 2003 (aged 19)	(Iraq Football Association) Naft Maysan
15	DF	Abbas Manie	11 January 2003 (aged 20)	(Iraq Football Association) Amanat Baghdad
16	FW	**Ali Jasim**	20 January 2004 (aged 19)	(Iraq Football Association) Al-Kahrabaa
17	DF	Muslim Mousa	11 March 2005 (aged 18)	(Iraq Football Association) Al-Mina'a
18	MF	Ali Sadiq	13 February 2003 (aged 20)	(Iraq Football Association) Al-Zawraa
19	DF	Sajjad Mahdi	25 February 2003 (aged 20)	(Iraq Football Association) Naft Maysan
20	MF	Abbas Majed	29 October 2003 (aged 19)	(Iraq Football Association) Al-Talaba
21	MF	Hayder Abdulkareem	7 August 2004 (aged 18)	(Iraq Football Association) Al-Zawraa

=== England ===
England announced their final squad on 11 May 2023.

Head coach: Ian Foster

No.	Pos.	Player	Date of birth (age)	Club
1	GK	Matthew Cox	2 May 2003 (aged 20)	(The Football Association) Brentford
2	DF	Brooke Norton-Cuffy	12 January 2004 (aged 19)	(The Football Association) Coventry City
3	DF	Callum Doyle	3 October 2003 (aged 19)	(The Football Association) Coventry City
4	MF	Alex Scott	21 August 2003 (aged 19)	(The Football Association) Bristol City
5	DF	Bashir Humphreys	15 March 2003 (aged 20)	(German Football Association) SC Paderborn
6	DF	**Jarell Quansah**	29 January 2003 (aged 20)	(The Football Association) Bristol Rovers
7	MF	Alfie Devine	1 August 2004 (aged 18)	(The Football Association) Tottenham Hotspur
8	MF	Xavier Simons	20 February 2003 (aged 20)	(The Football Association) Hull City
9	FW	Dane Scarlett	24 March 2004 (aged 19)	(The Football Association) Tottenham Hotspur
10	MF	Aaron Ramsey	21 January 2003 (aged 20)	(The Football Association) Middlesbrough
11	MF	**Harvey Vale** (captain)	11 September 2003 (aged 19)	(The Football Association) Chelsea
12	GK	James Beadle	16 July 2004 (aged 18)	(The Football Association) Crewe Alexandra
13	GK	Teddy Sharman-Lowe	30 March 2003 (aged 20)	(The Football Association) Havant & Waterlooville
14	MF	Darko Gyabi	18 February 2004 (aged 19)	(The Football Association) Leeds United
15	DF	Ronnie Edwards	28 March 2003 (aged 20)	(The Football Association) Peterborough United
16	DF	Imari Samuels	5 February 2003 (aged 20)	(The Football Association) Brighton & Hove Albion
17	MF	Samuel Edozie	28 January 2003 (aged 20)	(The Football Association) Southampton
18	FW	Mateo Joseph	19 October 2003 (aged 19)	(The Football Association) Leeds United
19	FW	Liam Delap	8 February 2003 (aged 20)	(The Football Association) Preston North End
20	FW	**Daniel Jebbison**	13 August 2003 (aged 19)	(The Football Association) Sheffield United
21	DF	Daniel Oyegoke	3 January 2003 (aged 20)	(The Football Association) Brentford

=== Tunisia ===
Tunisia announced their final squad on 8 May 2023.

Head coach: Montasser Louhichi

No.	Pos.	Player	Date of birth (age)	Club
1	GK	Raed Gazzeh	17 October 2003 (aged 19)	(Tunisian Football Federation) Étoile du Sahel
2	DF	Mahmoud Ghorbel	31 December 2003 (aged 19)	(Tunisian Football Federation) CS Sfaxien
3	DF	Zinedine Sassi	4 August 2003 (aged 19)	(Tunisian Football Federation) Espérance de Tunis
4	DF	Karim El Abed	27 February 2004 (aged 19)	(German Football Association) Karlsruher SC
5	DF	**Raed Bouchniba**	25 September 2003 (aged 19)	(Tunisian Football Federation) Espérance de Tunis
6	MF	Ghaith Ouahabi	2 May 2003 (aged 20)	(Tunisian Football Federation) Espérance de Tunis
7	MF	Samy Chouchane	5 September 2003 (aged 19)	(The Football Association) Brighton & Hove Albion
8	MF	Yassine Dridi	3 April 2003 (aged 20)	(Tunisian Football Federation) Club Africain
9	FW	**Youssef Snana**	24 March 2004 (aged 19)	(Tunisian Football Federation) Club Africain
10	MF	**Chaïm El Djebali**	7 February 2004 (aged 19)	(French Football Federation) Lyon
11	FW	Raki Aouani	11 September 2004 (aged 18)	(Tunisian Football Federation) Étoile du Sahel
12	GK	Thomas Zouaghi	11 April 2005 (aged 18)	(Italian Football Federation) Sassuolo
13	MF	**Wael Derbali**	18 June 2003 (aged 19)	(Tunisian Football Federation) Olympique Béja
14	DF	Rayan Nasraoui	27 June 2003 (aged 19)	(French Football Federation) Nîmes
15	MF	Baraket Hmidi	1 February 2003 (aged 20)	(Tunisian Football Federation) Club Sfaxien
16	GK	Dries Arfaoui	23 November 2004 (aged 18)	(Royal Belgian Football Association) Deinze
17	MF	Malek Mehri	21 October 2003 (aged 19)	(Tunisian Football Federation) Espérance de Tunis
18	FW	**Mohamed Dhaoui**	14 May 2003 (aged 20)	(Egyptian Football Association) Al Ahly
19	DF	Ali Saoudi	20 December 2003 (aged 19)	(Tunisian Football Federation) Stade Tunisien
20	FW	Béchir Yacoub	24 May 2004 (aged 18)	(French Football Federation) Monaco
21	FW	Jibril Othman	26 April 2004 (aged 19)	(French Football Federation) Saint-Étienne

== Group F ==
=== France ===
France announced their final squad on 10 May 2023.

Head coach: Landry Chauvin

No.	Pos.	Player	Date of birth (age)	Club
1	GK	Thimothée Lo-Tutala	13 February 2003 (aged 20)	(The Football Association) Hull City
2	DF	Tanguy Zoukrou	7 May 2003 (aged 20)	(French Football Federation) Troyes
3	DF	Thérence Koudou	13 December 2004 (aged 18)	(French Football Federation) Reims
4	DF	**Ousmane Camara**	6 March 2003 (aged 20)	(French Football Federation) Angers
5	DF	Félix Nzouango	7 January 2003 (aged 20)	(Italian Football Federation) Juventus
6	MF	Florent Da Silva	2 April 2003 (aged 20)	(Royal Dutch Football Association) Volendam
7	FW	Alan Virginius (captain)	3 January 2003 (aged 20)	(French Football Federation) Lille
8	MF	Warren Bondo	15 September 2003 (aged 19)	(Italian Football Federation) Reggina
9	FW	Malamine Efekele	19 July 2004 (aged 18)	(French Football Federation) Monaco
10	MF	Soungoutou Magassa	8 October 2003 (aged 19)	(French Football Federation) Monaco
11	FW	Sekou Lega	21 January 2003 (aged 20)	(French Football Federation) Lyon
12	FW	Antoine Joujou	12 March 2003 (aged 20)	(French Football Federation) Le Havre
13	FW	Wilson Odobert	28 November 2004 (aged 18)	(French Football Federation) Troyes
14	DF	**Cheick Keita**	2 April 2003 (aged 20)	(French Football Federation) Reims
15	MF	Etienne Camara	30 March 2003 (aged 20)	(The Football Association) Huddersfield Town
16	GK	Yann Lienard	16 March 2003 (aged 20)	(French Football Federation) Monaco
17	FW	Alexis Tibidi	3 November 2003 (aged 19)	(French Football Federation) Troyes
18	DF	**Jordan Semedo**	15 January 2003 (aged 20)	(French Football Federation) Monaco
19	DF	Brayann Pereira	21 May 2003 (aged 19)	(French Football Federation) Bourg-Péronnas
20	MF	Martin Adeline	2 December 2003 (aged 19)	(French Football Federation) Rodez
21	GK	Lucas Lavallée	18 February 2003 (aged 20)	(French Football Federation) Paris Saint-Germain

=== South Korea ===
South Korea announced their final squad on 5 May 2023.

Head coach: Kim Eun-jung

No.	Pos.	Player	Date of birth (age)	Club
1	GK	Kim Jun-hong	3 June 2003 (aged 19)	(Korea Football Association) Gimcheon Sangmu
2	DF	Park Chang-woo	1 March 2003 (aged 20)	(Korea Football Association) Jeonbuk Hyundai Motors
3	DF	Hwang In-taek	1 April 2003 (aged 20)	(Korea Football Association) Seoul E-Land
4	DF	Choi Seok-hyeon	13 January 2003 (aged 20)	(Korea Football Association) Dankook University
5	DF	Lee Chan-wook	3 February 2003 (aged 20)	(Korea Football Association) Gyeongnam FC
6	MF	Park Hyun-bin	19 May 2003 (aged 20)	(Korea Football Association) Incheon United
7	MF	Kim Yong-hak	20 May 2003 (aged 20)	(Portuguese Football Federation) Portimonense
8	MF	**Lee Seung-won**	6 March 2003 (aged 20)	(Korea Football Association) Gangwon FC
9	FW	Lee Young-jun	23 May 2003 (aged 19)	(Korea Football Association) Gimcheon Sangmu
10	MF	**Bae Jun-ho**	21 August 2003 (aged 19)	(Korea Football Association) Daejeon Hana Citizen
11	MF	**Kang Seong-jin**	26 March 2003 (aged 20)	(Korea Football Association) FC Seoul
12	GK	Kim Jung-hoon	9 August 2004 (aged 18)	(Korea Football Association) Korea University
13	DF	Choi Ye-hoon	19 August 2003 (aged 19)	(Korea Football Association) Busan IPark
14	MF	**Kang Sang-yoon**	31 May 2004 (aged 18)	(Korea Football Association) Jeonbuk Hyundai Motors
15	DF	Cho Young-kwang	11 March 2004 (aged 19)	(Korea Football Association) FC Seoul
16	MF	Lee Seung-joon	11 August 2004 (aged 18)	(Korea Football Association) FC Seoul
17	MF	Lee Ji-han	8 January 2003 (aged 20)	(German Football Association) SC Freiburg
18	FW	Park Seung-ho	11 September 2003 (aged 19)	(Korea Football Association) Incheon United
19	DF	Bae Seo-joon	11 December 2003 (aged 19)	(Korea Football Association) Daejeon Hana Citizen
20	DF	Kim Ji-soo	24 December 2004 (aged 18)	(Korea Football Association) Seongnam FC
21	GK	Moon Hyeon-ho	13 May 2003 (aged 20)	(Korea Football Association) Chungnam Asan

=== Gambia ===
The Gambia announced a provisional squad of 35 players on 1 May 2023. The final squad was announced on 10 May.

Head coach: Abdoulie Bojang

No.	Pos.	Player	Date of birth (age)	Club
1	GK	Pa Ebou Dampha	29 March 2003 (aged 20)	(Gambia Football Federation) Waa Banjul
2	FW	Ba Lamin Sowe	1 December 2003 (aged 19)	(Royal Spanish Football Federation) Tenerife
3	DF	**Sainey Sanyang**	18 April 2003 (aged 20)	(Gambia Football Federation) Hawks
4	DF	**Alagie Saine**	20 January 2003 (aged 20)	(Danish Football Association) AC Horsens
5	DF	Dembo Saidykhan	20 January 2004 (aged 19)	(Gambia Football Federation) Steve Biko
6	MF	**Mahmudu Bajo**	15 August 2004 (aged 18)	(Royal Spanish Football Federation) Granada
7	MF	Bailo Bah	4 March 2003 (aged 20)	(Gambia Football Federation) Hawks
8	MF	Salifu Colley	13 October 2003 (aged 19)	(Gambia Football Federation) Real de Banjul
9	FW	Mansour Mbye	1 January 2003 (aged 20)	(Gambia Football Federation) Banjul United
10	FW	Kajally Drammeh	10 October 2003 (aged 19)	(South African Football Association) Cape Town City
11	FW	Modou Lamin Marong	27 November 2005 (aged 17)	(Angolan Football Federation) Interclube
12	MF	Muhammed Jobe	26 May 2004 (aged 18)	(Gambia Football Federation) Real de Banjul
13	MF	Haruna Rasid Njie	23 September 2005 (aged 17)	(Gambia Football Federation) Gunjur United
14	MF	Muhammed Sawaneh	30 December 2003 (aged 19)	(Senegalese Football Federation) Teungueth
15	DF	Moses Jarju	5 October 2003 (aged 19)	(Gambia Football Federation) Fortune
16	DF	Bakary Jawara	2 April 2003 (aged 20)	(Gambia Football Federation) Fortune
17	GK	Youkasseh Sanyang	6 January 2004 (aged 19)	(Gambia Football Federation) Steve Biko
18	GK	Ebrima Jaiteh	19 December 2004 (aged 18)	(Gambia Football Federation) TMT FA
19	FW	Ebrima Singhateh	10 September 2003 (aged 19)	(Football Association of the Czech Republic) Slavia Prague
20	FW	**Adama Bojang**	28 May 2004 (aged 18)	(Gambia Football Federation) Steve Biko
21	FW	Mamin Sanyang	6 February 2003 (aged 20)	(German Football Association) Bayern Munich

=== Honduras ===
Honduras announced their final squad on 28 April 2023.

Head coach: Luis Alvarado

No.	Pos.	Player	Date of birth (age)	Club
1	GK	Juergen García	28 January 2005 (aged 18)	(National Autonomous Federation of Football of Honduras) Lone
2	DF	Darlin Mencia	9 April 2003 (aged 20)	(National Autonomous Federation of Football of Honduras) Real España
3	DF	Geremy Rodas	19 March 2004 (aged 19)	(United States Soccer Federation) Minnesota United FC
4	DF	Anfronit Tatum	2 June 2005 (aged 17)	(National Autonomous Federation of Football of Honduras) Real España
5	DF	Aaron Zúñiga	4 November 2003 (aged 19)	(National Autonomous Federation of Football of Honduras) Real España
6	MF	**David Ruiz**	8 February 2004 (aged 19)	(United States Soccer Federation) Inter Miami CF
7	FW	Odin Ramos	16 February 2004 (aged 19)	(National Autonomous Federation of Football of Honduras) Marathón
8	MF	Tomás Sorto	16 January 2003 (aged 20)	(National Autonomous Federation of Football of Honduras) Honduras Progreso
9	FW	Exon Arzú	19 May 2004 (aged 19)	(National Autonomous Federation of Football of Honduras) Real España
10	MF	Isaac Castillo	24 May 2003 (aged 19)	(National Autonomous Federation of Football of Honduras) Marathón
11	FW	Marco Aceituno	28 December 2003 (aged 19)	(National Autonomous Federation of Football of Honduras) Real España
12	GK	José Valdez	17 April 2003 (aged 20)	(National Autonomous Federation of Football of Honduras) Vida
13	MF	Heber Núñez	28 September 2003 (aged 19)	(National Autonomous Federation of Football of Honduras) Olimpia
14	DF	Javier Arriaga	1 August 2004 (aged 18)	(National Autonomous Federation of Football of Honduras) Marathón
15	MF	Kolton Kelly	12 February 2004 (aged 19)	(National Autonomous Federation of Football of Honduras) Victoria
16	DF	**Julián Martínez**	1 December 2003 (aged 19)	(National Autonomous Federation of Football of Honduras) Olimpia
17	FW	Maynor Arzu	16 November 2003 (aged 19)	(National Autonomous Federation of Football of Honduras) Real Sociedad
18	FW	Daniel Bodden	12 September 2003 (aged 19)	(National Autonomous Federation of Football of Honduras) Real España
19	FW	Jefryn Macías	2 January 2004 (aged 19)	(National Autonomous Federation of Football of Honduras) UPNFM
20	DF	Felix García	2 February 2004 (aged 19)	(National Autonomous Federation of Football of Honduras) Olimpia
21	GK	Medardo Laínez	4 February 2004 (aged 19)	(National Autonomous Federation of Football of Honduras) Real España
