= 2023 U-20 Africa Cup of Nations final =

Final match of the 2023 U-20 AFCON

- The official final promotion poster
- Event: 2023 U-20 Africa Cup of Nations
Senegal	The Gambia
(Senegal)	(The Gambia)
2	0
- Date: 11 March 2023
- Venue: Cairo International Stadium, Cairo
- Referee: Mahmoud Ahmed Nagy (Egypt)
- Weather: Partly cloudy; 22 °C (72 °F); 42% humidity

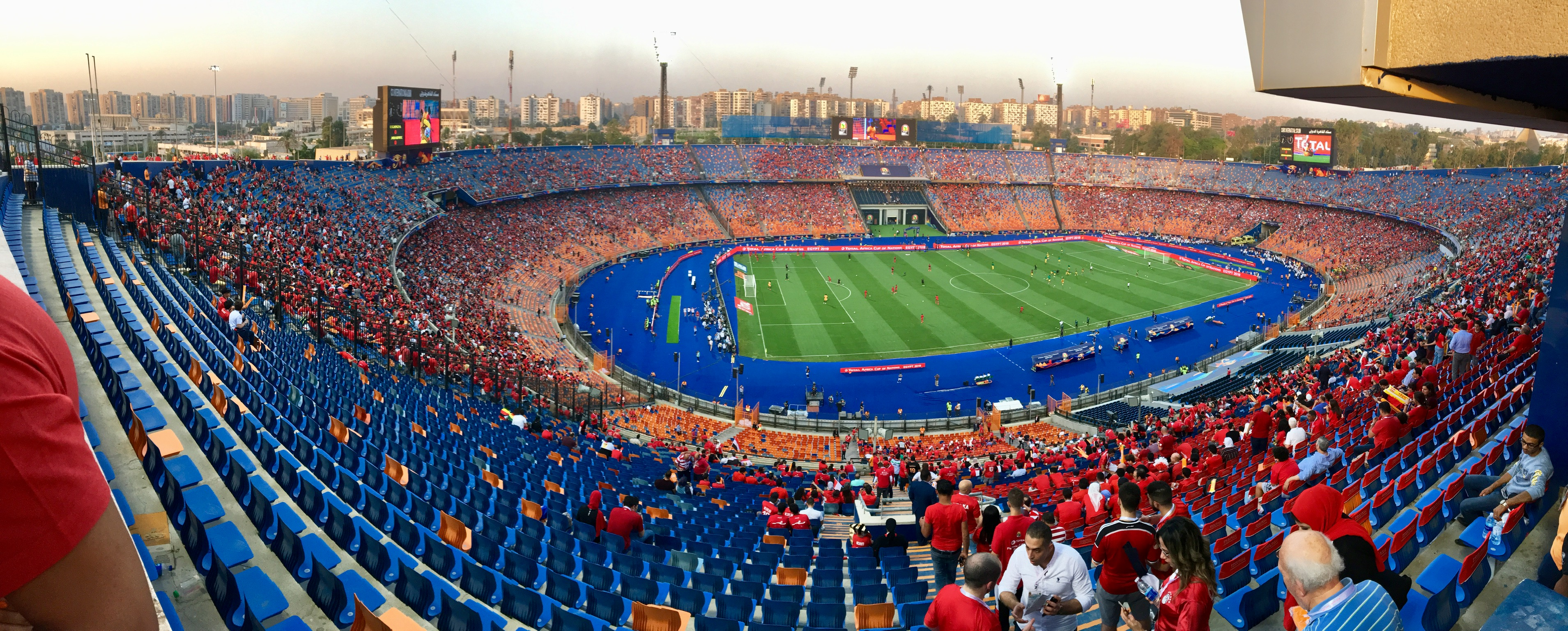
The Cairo International Stadium hosted the final.

The 2023 U-20 Africa Cup of Nations final was a football match played between Senegal and The Gambia at the Cairo International Stadium in Cairo, Egypt on 11 March 2023 to determine the winners of the 17th edition of the biennial African youth tournament for players under the age of 20.

Senegal defeated The Gambia 2–0 to win their inaugural tournament title.

== Venue ==
The final was held at the Cairo International Stadium in the Egyptian capital city of Cairo. Completed in 1960 and inaugurated on 23 July of the same year to mark 8 years since the 1952 Egyptian revolution. With a capacity of 75,000 seats, it is programmed to use Olympic-standard games.

== Route to the final ==
=== Senegal ===
Drawn in Group A, alongside Egypt, the hosts, Mozambique, and Nigeria, Senegal was looking forward to the tournament since they had been undefeated for over 2 years. Senegal's opening game was against Nigeria, a tough opponent who were also looking forward to win. Senegal had managed to pull up a good fight and managed to defeat them 1-0 despite Nigeria having more of the ball. Souleymane Faye scored the opening and winning goal. Senegal's next opponent was Mozambique, who had just drawn with Egypt. Senegal had won another clean sheet win, beating Mozambique 3–0. A stunning performance, goals from Pape Amadou Diallo, who had scored a brace, and Pape Diop. With two wins in their belts, Senegal had already qualified for the knouckout stages. Their third and last opponent of the group stage was against the hosts, Egypt. Senegal had increased their performance yet again despite Egypt having a higher possession rate, winning 4–0. Pape Diop had scored a hat-trick followed with Ibou Sane scoring one. Senegal had token first place in Group A, conceding no goals, while condemning both Egypt and Mozambique to U-20 AFCON elimination.

In the quarter-finals, the Senegalese had found themselves with Benin, who had qualified from rankings. the match would have been scoreless throughout the first half. In the second half, Senegal was awarded a free kick. Lamine Camara had stood up to take the free kick, he shot the ball on target where Samba Diallo used his head to score the opening match. Benin had time to respond as it was only fifty minutes through the game, but we're struggling to get past the Senegalese defenders. Senegal had defeated Benin 1–0, keeping their clean sheet streak and qualified to the semis. In the semi-finals, Senegal had found themselves faced between Group C runner-up Tunisia. Pape Diop had scored an early goal, scoring in the seventh minute. His goal was shot from a long distance after Souleymane Basse had passed the ball to him for an assist. Just ten minutes later, Lamine Camara would score a goal, making it 2–0. Tunisian player Mohamed Derbali made a sloppy pass to their goal keeper, Raed Gazzeh, where Camara managed to get to the ball first and blast it into the goal. Senegal kept on making chance after chance and were guaranteed to score another goal. In the fifty-second minute, Camara would score another goal to make it a brace. Samba Diallo had tried to shoot the ball into the goal but was block, he would later get the rebound and shoot again, but Gazzeh would save it. The ball went towards Camara's direction, where from there, he shot the goal inside the net. Senegal had booked themselves into the final for their fourth time.

Senegal
Round
The Gambia
Opponents
Result
Group stage
Opponents
Result
Nigeria
1–0
Match 1
Tunisia
1–0
Mozambique
0–3
Match 2
Zambia
0–2
Egypt
0–4
Match 3
Benin
1–0
Group A winner

Pos	Team	Pld	Pts
1	Senegal	3	9
2	Nigeria	2	6
3	Egypt (H)	3	1
4	Mozambique	3	1

Source: CAF
(H) Hosts
Final standings
Group C winner

Pos	Team	Pld	Pts
1	Gambia	3	9
2	Tunisia	3	4
3	Benin	3	2
4	Zambia	4	2

Source: CAF
Opponents
Result
Knockout stage
Opponents
Result
Benin
1–0
Quarter-finals
South Sudan
5–0
Tunisia
3–0
Semi-finals
Nigeria
1–0

== Match ==
=== Details ===
11 March 2023
19:00

Senegal	2–0	Gambia
S. Faye 6'; M.L. Camara 56'	Report

Cairo International Stadium, Cairo, Egypt
Referee: Mahmoud Ahmed Nagy (Egypt)

Senegal	Gambia

Formation: 4–1-4-1
GK	23	Landing Badji
RB	8	Amidou Diop	(yellow card) 93'
CB	12	Babacar Ndiaye	(yellow card) 30'
CB	13	Seydou Sano
LB	6	Souleymane Basse
MF	4	Mamadou Lamine Camara
RM	19	Pape Amadou Diallo	(substituted off) 74'
CM	5	Lamine Camara	(yellow card) 111'	(substituted off) 90+1'
CM	20	Pape Diop	(yellow card) 44'	(substituted off) 74'
LM	10	Samba Diallo (c)
ST	26	Souleymane Faye	(substituted off) 90+5'
Substitutions:
CM	3	Djibril Diarra	(substituted on) 74'
RM	22	Make Mor Faye	(substituted on) 74'
ST	9	Ibou Sané
MF	11	Mamadou Gning
CM	2	Mouhamed Guèye II	(substituted on) 90+1'
GK	16	Mamour Ndiaye
DF	18	Mapenda Mbow
ST	14	Libasse Ngom	(substituted on) 90+5'
DF	24	Mouhamed Guèye
ST	25	Mbaye Ndiaye
Coach:
(Senegal) Malick Daf

Formation: 4–2-2-2
GK	1	Pa Ebou Dampha
RB	15	Sainey Sanyang
CB	4	Alagie Saine (c)
CB	15	Moses Jarju
LB	16	Bakary Jawara	(substituted off) 75'
MF	6	Mahmudu Bajo
MF	7	Bailo Bah	(substituted off) 58'
MF	25	Modou Lamin Marong	(substituted off) 57'
MF	10	Kajally Drammeh	(substituted off) 75'
ST	20	Adama Bojang
ST	17	Alieu Gibba
Substitutions:
MF	2	Ba Lamin Sowe	(substituted on) 85'
DF	5	Dembo Saidykhan
ST	8	Salifu Colley
MF	9	Mansour Mbye
FW	11	Ismaila Manneh
MF	12	Momodou Salieu Jallow
MF	14	Muhamed Sawaneh	(substituted on) 58'
MF	19	Ebrima Singhateh	(substituted on) 75'	(substituted off) 85'
GK	22	Youkasseh Sanyang
Coach:
(The Gambia) Abdoulai Bojang

Match rules

- 90 minutes.
- 30 minutes of extra time if necessary.
- Penalty shoot-out if scores still level.
- Maximum of twelve named substitutes.
- Maximum of five substitutions, with a sixth allowed in extra time. (Note: Each team was given only three opportunities to make substitutions, with a fourth opportunity in extra time, excluding substitutions made at half-time, before the start of extra time and at half-time in extra time.)

== See also ==
- 2023 U-20 Africa Cup of Nations
- 2023 U-17 Africa Cup of Nations
