= Eletu =

Eletu is both a given name and a surname. Notable people with the name include:

- Eletu Kekere (r. c. 1775 – c. 1780), Yoruba monarch
- Victor Eletu (Born 2005), Nigerian footballer

== Other uses ==
- Eletu Odibo, Yoruba royal title
