= Nathaniel Nwosu =

Nigerian football player

Personal information
- Full name: Nathaniel Ikechukwu Nwosu
- Date of birth: 10 January 2006 (age 20)
- Height: 2.03 m (6 ft 8 in)
- Position: Goalkeeper

Team information
- Current team: Tayport

Youth career
- Water FC
- 2025: Brooke House College

Senior career*
Years	Team	Apps	(Gls)
2025–	Tayport		

International career^{‡}
2022–2023	Nigeria U20	10	(0)
2022	Nigeria U23	4	(0)
2022	Nigeria	1	(0)
- * Club domestic league appearances and goals ‡ National team caps and goals as of 16 April 2024

Nathaniel Ikechukwu Nwosu (born 10 January 2006) is a Nigerian footballer who plays as a goalkeeper for Midland League club Tayport and the Nigerian national team.

== Career ==
=== Early career ===
Nwosu is a product of the Water FC Academy in Abuja. Nwosu had started playing football as a defender but switched to playing as a goalkeeper at 11 years-old. He won the ‘golden gloves’ award for the best goalkeeper at the 2022 WAFU Zone B U-20 Tournament as he represented Nigeria at the tournament in which they triumphed overall. Nwosu was praised for his 6 ft 4” height and reach, he was also praised for his reflexes and agility. He was named in the team of the tournament.

=== 2022: Full international ===
Nwosu was called into the Nigerian squad for the 2022 African Nations Championship qualification matches against Ghana played in August and September 2022. In October 2022 he played as Nigeria reached the final round of the 2023 Africa U23 Cup of Nations with a 2-0 (and 3-1 aggregate) victory of Tanzania U23.

In November 2022 he was called up to the Nigeria squad for a pre-World Cup friendly match away against Costa Rica and made his senior international on November 10, 2022 debut appearing as a substitute against Costa Rica.

=== 2023: AFCON U20 & U20 WORLD CUP ===
In January 2023 Nwosu was called back in to the Nigerian under-20 team as they looked to qualify for the 2023 FIFA U-20 World Cup. He started the opening match of the AFCON U20 tournament for Nigeria against Senegal in February 2023, but was dropped for their second match against Egypt. In May 2023 he was named in the Nigeria squad for the 2023 FIFA U-20 World Cup.

=== 2024: African Games ===
In March 2024, he was named in the a Nigeria squad for the delayed 2023 African Games in Ghana.

== Career statistics ==
=== International ===
As of 9 November 2022

Appearances and goals by national team and year
National team	Year	Apps	Goals
Nigeria	2022	1	0
Total		1	0
