= Paul Jawa =

South Sudanese footballer (born 2004)

Personal information
- Full name: Paul America Jawa Mara
- Date of birth: 15 July 2004 (age 22)
- Place of birth: Juba, Sudan (now South Sudan)
- Height: 1.60 m (5 ft 3 in)
- Positions: Winger; attacking midfielder

Team information
- Current team: Jamus SC

Youth career
- 2014–: South Sudan Youths Sports Association
- –2021: Korogocho Youth Academy

Senior career*
Years	Team	Apps	(Gls)
2021–2024	Rainbow		(20+)
2024–2025	Kariobangi Sharks	10	(1+)
2025–2026	Fleury	0	(0)
2025–2026	Fleury B		
2026–	Jamus SC		

International career^{‡}
2017	South Sudan U13		
2023	South Sudan U20	4	(2)
2023–	South Sudan	12	(0)
- * Club domestic league appearances and goals as of 28 June 2026 ‡ National team caps and goals as of 28 June 2026

Paul America Jawa Mara (born 15 July 2004) is a South Sudanese footballer who plays as a winger and attacking midfielder for South Sudan Premier League side Jamus SC and the South Sudan national team.

== Early life ==
Born in Juba, Jawa fled from South Sudan to Kenya at 13 years old, following the battle of Juba in the South Sudanese civil war. Upon arriving in Nairobi, he was taken in by Geoffrey Kasudi, the CEO of the South Sudan Youth Sports Assistance Academy, who was later granted custody of Jawa. Later, Kasudi helped get him a spot at the Korogocho Youth Academy, using his connection to then-Kenya under-20 national team manager Stanley Okumbi.

== Club career ==
Jawa joined Kenyan side Rainbow in 2021, where he finished as the top goal scorer of the Kenyan Regional Leagues in the 2022 season, scoring 16 goals. In the summer of 2024, he joined Kenyan Premier League side Kariobangi Sharks, where he played 10 matches. In February 2025, Jawa signed for Championnat National 2 side Fleury, making his debut in the 2025–26 Coupe de France seventh round, during a 5–4 defeat against Metz APM.

In June 2026, Jawa returned to South Sudan with Jamus SC.

== International career ==
Jawa played for South Sudan's under-20 national team at the 2023 U-20 Africa Cup of Nations, where he scored the country's first ever goal at the tournament. He also played for them at the 2023 African Games.

Jawa made his senior debut for South Sudan on 23 March 2023, when he came on as a substitute in a 2–1 win against the DR Congo.

== Style of play ==
Jawa was nicknamed "Messi" for his dribbling ability and goalscoring.

== Personal life ==
Juba was the youngest of six siblings, although four of them died due to various illnesses. He is a fan of English football club Arsenal.
