= Abel Ogwuche =

Nigerian association football player

Personal information
- Full name: Abel Ogwuche
- Date of birth: 6 July 2003 (age 23)
- Height: 1.84 m (6 ft 0 in)
- Position: Centre-back

Team information
- Current team: Trelleborg
- Number: 5

Youth career
- –2022: Tripple 44 Academy

Senior career*
Years	Team	Apps	(Gls)
2022–	Trelleborg	81	(1)

International career
2023	Nigeria U-20	10	(0)
- * Club domestic league appearances and goals as of 16 November 2026

Abel Ogwuche (born 6 July 2003) is a Nigerian footballer who plays for Swedish side Trelleborgs FF as a centre-back.

== Club career ==
Ogwuche came through the Tripple 44 Academy in Ibadan. In February 2022 he began a trial period with the Swedish side Trelleborgs FF. The following month he signed for the club on a short term deal, with the option to extend. He made his Superettan debut for Trelleborgs on 21 August 2022 against Dalkurd FF.

In November 2022 it was announced that Ohwuche would be signing a professional contract, and that the agreement would keep him with the Swedish club into 2026.

== International career ==
Ogwuche was named in the Nigerian squad for the AFCON under-20 tournament in January 2023. He was awarded man of the match in the quarter-final win over Uganda that ensured Nigeria’s qualification for the 2023 FIFA U-20 World Cup. He was subsequently named in the Nigerian squad for the 2023 U20 World Cup.
