= 2023 U-20 Africa Cup of Nations =

24th edition of U-20 AFCON

2023 CAF U-20 Africa Cup of Nations
كأس أمم إفريقيا تحت 20 سنة 2023

Tournament details
- Host country: Egypt
- Dates: 19 February – 11 March
- Teams: 12 (from 1 confederation)
- Venues: 3 (in 3 host cities)

Final positions
- Champions: Senegal (1st title)
- Runners-up: Gambia
- Third place: Nigeria
- Fourth place: Tunisia

Tournament statistics
- Matches played: 26
- Goals scored: 54 (2.08 per match)
- Top scorer: (Senegal) Pape Diop (5 goals)
- Best player: (Senegal) Lamine Camara
- Best goalkeeper: (Senegal) Landing Badji
- Fair play award: Nigeria

The 2023 U-20 Africa Cup of Nations (Arabic: كأس أمم إفريقيا تحت 20 سنة 2023, French: Coupe d'Afrique des nations de football des moins de 20 ans 2023), known as the 2023 U20 AFCON or 2023 AFCON U20 for short and as the 2023 TotalEnergies U-20 Africa Cup of Nations for sponsorship purposes, was the 17th edition (24th if editions of the tournament without hosts are included) of the biennial African international youth football tournament organized by the Confederation of African Football. Egypt hosted the tournament, which took place from 19 February to 11 March 2023. The tournament involved 12 teams, Senegal won the tournament for the first time, defeating Gambia in the final and did not concede a single goal the entire tournament.

This edition of the tournament also doubles as the African qualifiers for the 2023 FIFA U-20 World Cup in Argentina where teams who reached the semi-finals stage qualified automatically and also for the 2023 African Games in Accra, Ghana where teams who reached the quarter-finals stage qualified automatically too.

Ghana were the defending champions following their 4th title win in 2021, but failed to qualify for this edition after losing to Nigeria in the WAFU sub-regional qualification tournament.

== Qualification ==
=== Player eligibility ===
Players born 1 January 2003 or later are eligible to participate in the competition.

=== Qualified teams ===
The following 12 teams qualified for the group stages:

| Team | Zone | Date of qualification | Appearance | Last appearance | Previous best performance |
|---|---|---|---|---|---|
| Egypt (hosts) | North Zone | 16 May 2021 | 12th | 2017 | Champions (1991, 2003, 2013) |
| Tunisia | North Zone | 24 October 2022 | 2nd | 2021 | Fourth place (2021) |
| Benin | West B Zone | 17 May 2022 | 3rd | 2013 | Third place (2005) |
| Nigeria | West B Zone | 17 May 2022 | 12th | 2019 | Champions (2005, 2011, 2015) |
| Senegal | West A Zone | 9 September 2022 | 6th | 2019 | Runners-up (2015, 2017, 2019) |
| Gambia | West A Zone | 9 September 2022 | 4th | 2021 | Third place (2007, 2021) |
| Central African Republic | Central Zone | 14 December 2022 | 2nd | 2021 | Quarter-finals (2021) |
| Congo | Central Zone | 14 December 2022 | 3rd | 2015 | Champions (2007) |
| Uganda | Central-East Zone | 8 November 2022 | 2nd | 2021 | Runners-up (2021) |
| South Sudan | Central-East Zone | 8 November 2022 | 1st | None | Debut |
| Mozambique | South Zone | 14 October 2022 | 2nd | 2021 | Group stage (2021) |
| Zambia | South Zone | 14 October 2022 | 8th | 2017 | Champions (2017) |

== Venues ==
| 2023 U-20 Africa Cup of Nations is located in Egypt | Cairo | Ismailia |
|---|---|---|
| 2023 U-20 Africa Cup of Nations is located in Egypt | Cairo International Stadium | Suez Canal Stadium |
| 2023 U-20 Africa Cup of Nations is located in Egypt | Capacity: 75,000 | Capacity: 22,000 |
| 2023 U-20 Africa Cup of Nations is located in Egypt | Alexandria | |
| 2023 U-20 Africa Cup of Nations is located in Egypt | Haras El Hodoud Stadium | Alexandria Stadium |
| 2023 U-20 Africa Cup of Nations is located in Egypt | Capacity: 22,000 | Capacity: 20,000 |

== Match officials ==
On 18 February 2023, CAF announced a total of 16 referees (including 2 women), 18 assistant referees (including 4 women) and 6 video assistant referees (VAR) appointed for the tournament.

Referees

- (Benin) Issa Mouhamed
- (Burkina Faso) Hamidou Diero
- (Comoros) Mohamed Athoumani
- (Democratic Republic of the Congo) Yannick Kabanga Malala
- (Ivory Coast) Clement Franklin Kpan
- (Djibouti) Mohamed Diraneh Guedi
- (Egypt) Mahmoud Ahmed Nagy
- (The Gambia) Lamin Jammeh
- (Libya) Ahmed Abdulrazg
- (Mali) Sory Ibrahima Keita
- (Morocco) Jallal Jayed
- (Morocco) Bouchra Karboubi
- (Somalia) Omar Abdulkadir Artan
- (Rwanda) Jean-Claude Ishimwe
- (Senegal) El Hadj Amadou Sy
- (South Africa) Akhona Makalima

Assistant referees

- (Algeria) Hamza Bouzit
- (Burundi) Pascal Ndimunzigo
- (Republic of the Congo) Styven Moutsassi
- (Egypt) Yara Atef
- (Egypt) Mohamed Abouzid Sami Halhal
- (Ethiopia) Yehualashet Fasika Biru
- (Ghana) Roland Nii Dodoo
- (Liberia) Joel Wonka Doe
- (Madagascar) Dimbiniaina Andriatianarivelo
- (Mali) Fanta Idrissa Kone
- (Morocco) Fatiha Jermoumi
- (Morocco) Soukaina Hamdi
- (Niger) Abdoul Aziz Moctar Saley
- (Nigeria) Igho Hope
- (Seychelles) Shaji Padayachy
- (Sudan) Omer Hamid Mohamed Ahmed
- (Togo) Jonathan Ahonto Koffi
- (Tunisia) Mohamed Bakir

Video assistant referees

- (Cameroon) Elvis Noupoue
- (Egypt) Mahmoud Ashour
- (Egypt) Ahmed Elghandour
- (Ghana) Daniel Nii Laryea
- (Mauritania) Dahane Beida
- (Senegal) El Hadj Malick Samba

== Draw ==
The draw for the group stage was held at CAF's headquarters in Cairo, Egypt on 23 December 2022 at 19:00 EST (UTC+2). The 12 teams were drawn into 3 groups of 4 with the teams seeded according to their performance in the previous edition of the tournament. Hosts Egypt automatically seeded and assigned to Position A1 in the draw.

| Pot 1 | Pot 2 | Pot 3 |
|---|---|---|
| 1. Egypt (hosts); 2. Uganda (2); 3. Gambia (3) | 4. Tunisia (4); 5. Central African Republic (8); 6. Mozambique (11) | 7. Nigeria (NR); 8. Zambia (NR); 9. Senegal (NR); 10. Benin (NR); 11. Congo (NR); 12. South Sudan (NR) |

== Group stage ==
The top two teams of each group advance to the quarter-finals along with the two best 3rd-placed teams.

=== Tiebreakers ===
Teams are ranked according to points (3 for a win, 1 for a draw and none for a loss), and if tied on points, the following tie-breaking criteria are applied, in the order given, to determine the rankings (Regulations Article 13).

1. Points in head-to-head matches among tied teams;
2. Goal difference in head-to-head matches among tied teams;
3. Goals scored in head-to-head matches among tied teams;
4. If more than two teams are tied, and after applying all head-to-head criteria above, a subset of teams are still tied, all head-to-head criteria above are reapplied exclusively to this subset of teams;
5. Goal difference in all group matches;
6. Goals scored in all group matches;
7. Drawing of lots.

All times are in EST (UTC+2).

=== Group A ===
| Pos | Team | Pld | W | D | L | GF | GA | GD | Pts | Qualification |
|---|---|---|---|---|---|---|---|---|---|---|
| 1 | Senegal | 3 | 3 | 0 | 0 | 8 | 0 | +8 | 9 | Knockout stage |
| 2 | Nigeria | 3 | 2 | 0 | 1 | 3 | 1 | +2 | 6 | Knockout stage |
| 3 | Egypt (H) | 3 | 0 | 1 | 2 | 0 | 5 | −5 | 1 (Note: Drawing of lots: Egypt 1; Mozambique 2) | |
| 4 | Mozambique | 3 | 0 | 1 | 2 | 0 | 5 | −5 | 1 | |

Source: CAF
Rules for classification: Group stage tiebreakers
(H) Hosts
Notes:
19 February 2023
16:00

| Egypt | 0–0 | Mozambique |
|---|---|---|
| | Report |

Cairo International Stadium, Cairo
Referee: Omar Artan (Somalia)
19 February 2023
19:00

| Senegal | 1–0 | Nigeria |
|---|---|---|
| S. Faye 40' | Report |

Cairo International Stadium, Cairo
Referee: Jalal Jayed (Morocco)

22 February 2023
16:00

| Mozambique | 0–3 | Senegal |
|---|---|---|
| | Report | P. Diallo 45+2', 85'; P. Diop 53' |

Cairo International Stadium, Cairo
Referee: Ahmed Abdulrazg (Libya)
22 February 2023
19:00

| Nigeria | 1–0 | Egypt |
|---|---|---|
| Agbalaka 71' | Report |

Cairo International Stadium, Cairo
Referee: Jean-Claude Ishimwe (Rwanda)

25 February 2023
19:00

| Egypt | 0–4 | Senegal |
|---|---|---|
| | Report | P. Diop 59', 73', 76'; I. Sané 69' |

Cairo International Stadium, Cairo
Referee: Mohamed Athoumani (Comoros)
25 February 2023
19:00

| Mozambique | 0–2 | Nigeria |
|---|---|---|
| | Report | Lawal 33'; Muhammad 41' |

Suez Canal Stadium, Ismailia
Referee: Yannick Kabanga Malala (DR Congo)

=== Group B ===
| Pos | Team | Pld | W | D | L | GF | GA | GD | Pts | Qualification |
|---|---|---|---|---|---|---|---|---|---|---|
| 1 | Uganda | 3 | 1 | 2 | 0 | 4 | 3 | +1 | 5 (Note: Drawing of lots: Uganda 1; Congo 2) | Knockout stage |
| 2 | Congo | 3 | 1 | 2 | 0 | 4 | 3 | +1 | 5 | Knockout stage |
| 3 | South Sudan | 3 | 1 | 1 | 1 | 2 | 2 | 0 | 4 | Knockout stage |
| 4 | Central African Republic | 3 | 0 | 1 | 2 | 1 | 3 | −2 | 1 | |

Source: CAF
Rules for classification: Group stage tiebreakers
Notes:
20 February 2023
16:00

| Uganda | 2–1 | Central African Republic |
|---|---|---|
| Mugulusi 47'; Dembe 74' | Report | Gbenou 90+5' |

Suez Canal Stadium, Ismailia
Referee: Akhona Makalima (South Africa)
20 February 2023
19:00

| South Sudan | 1–2 | Congo |
|---|---|---|
| Jawa 83' | Report | Bassinga 45'; Soussou 63' (pen.) |

Suez Canal Stadium, Ismailia
Referee: Bouchra Karboubi (Morocco)

23 February 2023
16:00

| Central African Republic | 0–1 | South Sudan |
|---|---|---|
| | Report | Jawa 2' (pen.) |

Suez Canal Stadium, Ismailia
Referee: Clement Franklin Kpan (Ivory Coast)
23 February 2023
19:00

| Congo | 2–2 | Uganda |
|---|---|---|
| Loulendo 6'; Mombouli 72' | Report | Ssematimba 11'; Mayanja 33' |

Suez Canal Stadium, Ismailia
Referee: Lamin Jammeh (Gambia)

26 February 2023
19:00

| Uganda | 0–0 | South Sudan |
|---|---|---|
| | Report |

Suez Canal Stadium, Ismailia
Referee: Issa Mouhamed (Benin)
26 February 2023
19:00

| Central African Republic | 0–0 | Congo |
|---|---|---|
| | Report |

Cairo International Stadium, Cairo
Referee: Hamidou Diero (Burkina Faso)

=== Group C ===
| Pos | Team | Pld | W | D | L | GF | GA | GD | Pts | Qualification |
|---|---|---|---|---|---|---|---|---|---|---|
| 1 | Gambia | 3 | 3 | 0 | 0 | 4 | 0 | +4 | 9 | Knockout stage |
| 2 | Tunisia | 3 | 1 | 1 | 1 | 2 | 2 | 0 | 4 | Knockout stage |
| 3 | Benin | 3 | 0 | 2 | 1 | 1 | 2 | −1 | 2 | Knockout stage |
| 4 | Zambia | 3 | 0 | 1 | 2 | 2 | 5 | −3 | 1 | |

Source: CAF
Rules for classification: Group stage tiebreakers
21 February 2023
16:00

| Gambia | 1–0 | Tunisia |
|---|---|---|
| Saine 84' | Report |

Alexandria Stadium, Alexandria
Referee: Mohamed Athoumani (Comoros)
21 February 2023
19:00

| Benin | 1–1 | Zambia |
|---|---|---|
| Aloko 57' | Report | Ng'ambi 60' |

Alexandria Stadium, Alexandria
Referee: Mohamed Diraneh Guedi (Djibouti)

24 February 2023
16:00

| Tunisia | 0–0 | Benin |
|---|---|---|
| | Report |

Haras El Hodoud Stadium, Alexandria
Referee: El Hadj Amadou Sy (Senegal)
24 February 2023
19:00

| Zambia | 0–2 | Gambia |
|---|---|---|
| | Report | Drammeh 63'; Saine 81' (pen.) |

Haras El Hodoud Stadium, Alexandria
Referee: Mahmoud Ahmed Nagy (Egypt)

27 February 2023
19:00

| Gambia | 1–0 | Benin |
|---|---|---|
| Ouorou 88' (o.g.) | Report |

Haras El Hodoud Stadium, Alexandria
Referee: Sory Ibrahima Keita (Mali)
27 February 2023
19:00

| Tunisia | 2–1 | Zambia |
|---|---|---|
| Othman 31'; Dhaoui 59' | Report | Mutandwa 58' |

Cairo International Stadium, Cairo
Referee: Omar Artan (Somalia)

=== Ranking of third-placed teams ===
| Pos | Grp | Team | Pld | W | D | L | GF | GA | GD | Pts | Qualification |
|---|---|---|---|---|---|---|---|---|---|---|---|
| 1 | B | South Sudan | 3 | 1 | 1 | 1 | 2 | 2 | 0 | 4 | Knockout stage |
| 2 | C | Benin | 3 | 0 | 2 | 1 | 1 | 2 | −1 | 2 | Knockout stage |
| 3 | A | Egypt | 3 | 0 | 1 | 2 | 0 | 5 | −5 | 1 | |

Source: CAF

== Knockout stage ==
Quarter-finals
2 March – Cairo
Senegal | 1
Benin | 0
3 March – Cairo
Congo | 3 (4)
Tunisia (p) | 3 (5)
3 March – Alexandria
Gambia | 5
South Sudan | 0
2 March – Suez
Uganda | 0
Nigeria | 1

Semi-finals
6 March – Suez
Senegal | 3
Tunisia | 0
6 March – Cairo
Gambia | 1
Nigeria | 0

Final
11 March – Cairo
Senegal | 2
Gambia | 0
Third place
10 March – Cairo
Tunisia | 0
Nigeria | 4

=== Quarter-finals ===
Winners qualify for the 2023 FIFA U-20 World Cup.

2 March 2023
16:00

| Senegal | 1–0 | Benin |
|---|---|---|
| S. Diallo 51' | Report |

Cairo International Stadium, Cairo
Referee: Jean-Claude Ishimwe (Rwanda)

2 March 2023
19:00

| Uganda | 0–1 | Nigeria |
|---|---|---|
| | Report | Juma 30' (o.g.) |

Suez Canal Stadium, Ismailia
Referee: Mahmoud Ahmed Nagy (Egypt)

3 March 2023
16:00

| Gambia | 5–0 | South Sudan |
|---|---|---|
| Bojang 7', 33', 47'; Jarju 28'; Bajo 70' | Report |

Haras El Hodoud Stadium, Alexandria
Referee: Jalal Jayed (Morocco)

3 March 2023
19:00

| Congo | 3–3 (a.e.t.) | Tunisia |
|---|---|---|
| Bassinga 24', 80', 102' (pen.) | Report | Othman 37'; Chouchane 76'; Saoudi 119' |
Penalties
| Moutou (penalty scored); Bowamba (penalty scored); Manouana (penalty missed); Ngandziami (penalty scored); Maniongui (penalty scored); Loulendo (penalty missed); Diambomba (penalty missed) | 4–5 | (penalty scored) Ghorbel; (penalty scored) Dhaoui; (penalty missed) Hmidi; (penalty scored) Chouchane; (penalty scored) Garreb; (penalty missed) Snana; (penalty scored) Abid |

Cairo International Stadium, Cairo
Referee: Clement Franklin Kpan (Ivory Coast)

=== Semi-finals ===
6 March 2023
16:00

| Senegal | 3–0 | Tunisia |
|---|---|---|
| P. Diop 7'; L. Camara 17', 52' | Report |

Suez Canal Stadium, Ismailia
Referee: Omar Artan (Somalia)

6 March 2023
19:00

| Gambia | 1–0 | Nigeria |
|---|---|---|
| Bojang 7' | Report |

Cairo International Stadium, Cairo
Referee: Ahmed Abdulrazg (Libya)

=== Third place ===
10 March 2023
16:00

| Tunisia | 0–4 | Nigeria |
|---|---|---|
| | Report | Muhammad 9'; Abdullahi 46'; Sunday 48', 90' |

Cairo International Stadium, Cairo
Referee: Mohamed Athoumani (Comoros)

=== Final ===
11 March 2023
19:00

| Senegal | 2–0 | Gambia |
|---|---|---|
| S. Faye 6'; M. Camara 56' | Report |

Cairo International Stadium, Cairo
Referee: Mahmoud Ahmed Nagy (Egypt)

== Goalscorers ==
There were 54 goals scored in 26 matches, for an average of 2.08 goals per match.

5 goals

- (Senegal) Pape Diop

4 goals

- (Republic of the Congo) Déo Bassinga
- (The Gambia) Adama Bojang

2 goals

- (The Gambia) Alagie Saine
- (Nigeria) Ibrahim Muhammad
- (Nigeria) Jude Sunday
- (Senegal) Lamine Camara
- (Senegal) Pape Amadou Diallo
- (Senegal) Souleymane Faye
- (South Sudan) Paul Jawa
- (Tunisia) Jibril Othman

1 goal

- (Benin) Rodolfo Aloko
- (Central African Republic) Boris Gbenou
- (Republic of the Congo) Josna Loulendo
- (Republic of the Congo) Arnauvy Mombouli
- (Republic of the Congo) Prince Soussou
- (The Gambia) Mahmodou Bajo
- (The Gambia) Kajally Drammeh
- (The Gambia) Moses Jarju
- (Nigeria) Ahmed Abdullahi
- (Nigeria) Solomon Agbalaka
- (Nigeria) Samson Lawal
- (Senegal) Mamadou Lamine Camara
- (Senegal) Samba Diallo
- (Senegal) Ibou Sané
- (Tunisia) Samy Chouchane
- (Tunisia) Mohamed Dhaoui
- (Tunisia) Ali Saoudi
- (Uganda) John Paul Dembe
- (Uganda) Saidi Mayanja
- (Uganda) Isma Mugulusi
- (Uganda) Titus Ssematimba
- (Zambia) Kingston Mutandwa
- (Zambia) Rickson N'gambi

1 own goal

- (Benin) Tamimou Ouorou (against the Gambia)
- (Uganda) Ibrahim Juma (against Nigeria)

== Awards ==
The following awards were given at the conclusion of the tournament:

Player of the Tournament
(Senegal) Lamine Camara
Top Scorer
(Senegal) Pape Diop

(5 goals)

Best Goalkeeper
(Senegal) Landing Badji
Best Coach
Malick Daf (Senegal)
CAF Fair Play Team
Nigeria

=== Team of the Tournament ===
| Goalkeeper | Defenders | Midfielders | Forwards |
|---|---|---|---|
| (Senegal) Landing Badji | (Nigeria) Augustine Njoku; (Senegal) Seydou Sano; (The Gambia) Alagie Saine; (Nigeria) Solomon Agbalaka | (Senegal) Pape Diop; (Senegal) Lamine Camara; (Republic of the Congo) Prince Soussou | (The Gambia) Adama Bojang; (Republic of the Congo) Deogracias Bassinga; (Uganda) Rogers Mugisha |

== Qualified teams for the FIFA U-20 World Cup ==
The following teams from CAF qualified for the 2023 FIFA U-20 World Cup in Argentina.

| Team | Qualified on | Previous appearances in FIFA U-20 World Cup^{1} |
|---|---|---|
| Senegal | 2 March 2023 | 3 (2015, 2017, 2019) |
| Nigeria | 2 March 2023 | 12 (1983, 1985, 1987, 1989, 1999, 2005, 2007, 2009, 2011, 2013, 2015, 2019) |
| Gambia | 3 March 2023 | 1 (2007) |
| Tunisia | 3 March 2023 | 2 (1977, 1985) |

^{1} Bold indicates champions for that year. Italic indicates hosts for that year.

== Qualified teams for the 2023 African Games ==
The following teams qualified for the 2023 African Games men's football tournament in Accra, Ghana.

| Team | Qualified on | Previous appearances in African Games^{1} |
|---|---|---|
| Ghana | Host nation | 7 (1973, 1978, 2003, 2007, **2011**, 2015, 2019) |
| Nigeria | 25 February 2023 | 7 (**1973**, 1978, 1991, 1995, 2003, 2015, 2019) |
| Senegal | 25 February 2023 | 5 (1987, 2003, 2011, **2015**, 2019) |
| Congo | 26 February 2023 | 4 (**1965**, 1973, 1995, 2015) |
| South Sudan | 26 February 2023 | 0 (debut) |
| Uganda | 26 February 2023 | 4 (1965, 1991, 1999, 2011) |
| Benin | 27 February 2023 | 0 (debut) |
| Gambia | 27 February 2023 | 0 (debut) |
| Tunisia | 27 February 2023 | 3 (1987, 1991, 2007) |

^{1} Bold indicates champions for that year. Italic indicates hosts for that year.

== See also ==
- 2023 U-17 Africa Cup of Nations
