= Trelleborgs FF =

Association football club in Trelleborg, Sweden

Trelleborg
- Full name: Trelleborgs Fotbollförening
- Founded: 6 December 1926; 99 years ago
- Ground: Vångavallen, Trelleborg
- Capacity: 7,000
- Chairman: Torbjörn Jönsson
- Manager: Andreas Granqvist
- League: Superettan
- 2026: Ettan Södra, 1st of 16 (Promoted)
| Home colours | Away colours |

Trelleborgs Fotbollsförening, more commonly known as Trelleborgs FF or simply Trelleborg, is a Swedish football club located in Trelleborg. Formed 6 December 1926, the club plays in Superettan from 2027 season, the second tier in the Swedish football league system after promotion from Ettan in 2026, while the women's team play in Elitettan, the women's second division. Trelleborgs FF has participated 17 times in Allsvenskan and once in the UEFA Cup where the team eliminated Blackburn Rovers in the 1994–1995 season.

Trelleborg has had a reputation for being a less fashionable provincial side, making the most of limited resources and a small fan base. The team has typically been recognised by its performing goalkeepers, a strong defence and a good home record. In 2006 the team broke the Superettan record for the longest period without conceding a goal.

The club is affiliated to the Skånes Fotbollförbund.

== History ==
=== Promotion to top division and qualifying for the UEFA Cup ===
A chart showing the progress of Trelleborgs FF through the swedish football league system. The different shades of gray represent league divisions.

Trelleborg's football club achieved promotion to the top Swedish league in 1984 and experienced its peak in the early nineties. Notably, they secured third place in Allsvenskan in 1992, their best finish, followed by a fourth-place finish in 1993 and UEFA Cup participation. Despite being often predicted for demotion, the team employed effective but less attractive defensive long-ball tactics in the late nineties. Trelleborg's stadium, Vångavallen, earned the nickname "Tjongavallen" due to the team's style. After a disappointing 2001 season, the club was relegated.

=== Recent years ===
Trelleborg playing against Hammarby in the 2020–21 Svenska Cupen quarterfinal.

The club gained promotion to the top league for the third time in 2003 just to be demoted directly, since it came after the Trelleborg board hired the Dane Ole Mørk, who was supposed to change the Trelleborg style of play into a more attractive short-passing game. In 2005, TFF finished eleventh in Superettan after a turbulent year, while 2006 became a successful year for the team. Three rounds before the end of Superettan 2006, Trelleborg stood as a clear winner, thus gaining promotion to the 2007 Allsvenskan. Relegation was narrowly avoided with a superior goal difference in 2007. In 2008 Tom Prahl, trainer during the success years in the early nineties, returned as head coach. Trelleborg finished at tenth place in an even season where Rasmus Bengtsson amongst others had an inspiring season. In 2009 the team finished at ninth place after a strong finish. In 2010 the teams tactics changed to a more creative and public friendly game style. The team finished fifth after a strong autumn, their best position since 1993, just to be relegated in 2011, after conceding 64 goals in 16 matches and finishing second last. In 2012, Trelleborg was relegated from Superettan, and the following year they failed to re-qualify for Superettan by finishing third place in Division 1 (Swedish football). In 2014 they only avoided getting relegated from Division 1 (Swedish football) through goal difference, however, the next year they won the league and therefore qualified for the 2016 Superettan. In 2017, Trelleborg finished in third place and qualified for playoffs against Jönköpings Södra IF where they won 3–1 in aggregate and were promoted to Allsvenskan after a 6-year hiatus. The return was short-lived, however, and they were relegated after finishing in last place in the 2018 Allsvenskan.

== Achievements ==
=== League ===
- Superettan
  - Winners (1): 2006
  - Runners-up (1): 2003
- Division 1 Södra
  - Winners (1): 1991, 2015
  - Runners-up (2): 1987, 1989

== Players ==
=== Current squad ===
As of 3 September 2026

Note: Flags indicate national team as defined under FIFA eligibility rules; some limited exceptions apply. Players may hold more than one non-FIFA nationality.

| No. | Pos. | Nation | Player |
|---|---|---|---|
| 1 | GK | SWE | Malte Påhlsson |
| 2 | DF | SWE | Johan Brannefalk |
| 3 | DF | ISL | Oskar Sverrisson |
| 4 | DF | SWE | Abbe Rehn |
| 5 | DF | NGR | Abel Ogwuche |
| 6 | MF | ALB | Ammar Asani |
| 7 | MF | SWE | Jacob Christiansen |
| 8 | FW | SWE | Oskar Ruuska |
| 9 | FW | NOR | Emil Jaf |
| 10 | MF | SWE | Sebastian Tipura |
| 11 | FW | SWE | Remo Grgic |
| 12 | DF | LBR | Prince Balde |
| 13 | MF | ISL | Bjarni Antonsson Duffield |

| No. | Pos. | Nation | Player |
|---|---|---|---|
| 14 | FW | SWE | Johan Gudmundsson |
| 15 | MF | SWE | Viggo Karlsson (on loan from Malmö FF) |
| 16 | DF | KOS | Donart Lubishtani |
| 17 | MF | SWE | Isak Ellbring |
| 18 | DF | SWE | Jesper Modig |
| 19 | FW | SWE | Altin Mehmeti |
| 20 | FW | SWE | Kofi Fosuhene Asare |
| 21 | MF | SWE | Oskar Gabrielsson |
| 22 | MF | SWE | Niclas Bergmark |
| 25 | FW | SWE | Elliot Löfberg |
| 27 | MF | SWE | Alexander Baraslievski |
| 30 | GK | SWE | Wilhelm Malmgren |

==== Out on loan ====
Note: Flags indicate national team as defined under FIFA eligibility rules; some limited exceptions apply. Players may hold more than one non-FIFA nationality.

| No. | Pos. | Nation | Player |

== Management ==
=== Organisation ===
As of 1 January 2018

| Name | Role |
|---|---|
| (Sweden) Torbjörn Jönsson | Chairman |
| (Sweden) Mattias Kronvall | Director of football |
| (Sweden) Hasse Mattisson | Head of marketing |

=== Technical staff ===
As of 9 December 2019

| Name | Role |
|---|---|
| (Sweden) Kristian Haynes | Manager |
| (Sweden) Alexander Tengryd | Assistant coach |
| (Sweden) Magnus Andersson | Assistant coach and fitness coach |
| (Sweden) Tomas Håkansson | Goalkeeper coach |
