= Facundo Machado =

Uruguayan footballer (born 2004)

Personal information
- Full name: Facundo Machado Campos
- Date of birth: 19 January 2004 (age 22)
- Place of birth: Rivera, Uruguay
- Height: 1.86 m (6 ft 1 in)
- Position: Goalkeeper

Team information
- Current team: Nacional
- Number: 1

Youth career
- Nacional

Senior career*
Years	Team	Apps	(Gls)
2023–	Nacional	0	(0)

International career
2021	Uruguay U17	2	(0)
2022–2023	Uruguay U20	4	(0)
2023	Uruguay U23	1	(0)
Medal record
Men's football
Representing Uruguay
FIFA U-20 World Cup
Winner	2023 Argentina
South American U-20 Championship
Runner-up	2023 Colombia
- * Club domestic league appearances and goals as of 7 July 2024

Facundo Machado Campos (born 19 January 2004) is a Uruguayan professional footballer who plays as a goalkeeper for Nacional.

== Honours ==
Uruguay U20

- FIFA U-20 World Cup: 2023
- South American U-20 Championship runner-up: 2023
