= Stalin Valencia =

Ecuadorean footballer

Personal information
- Full name: Stalin Evander Valencia Cortez
- Date of birth: 10 October 2003 (age 23)
- Height: 1.80 m (5 ft 11 in)
- Position: Defender

Team information
- Current team: Emelec
- Number: 51

Youth career
- –2017: Independiente del Valle
- 2017–2018: Clan Juvenil
- 2018–2020: Norte América

Senior career*
Years	Team	Apps	(Gls)
2020–2022	LDU Quito	1	(0)
2022–2024	Pumas Tabasco	15	(0)
2024–2026	Once Caldas	17	(0)
2025	→ Fortaleza (loan)	11	(0)
2026–	Emelec	2	(0)

International career
2023–	Ecuador U-20	2	(0)
- * Club domestic league appearances and goals as of 22:22, 14 March 2026 (UTC)

Stalin Evander Valencia Cortez (born 10 October 2003) is an Ecuadorean footballer who plays for Ecuadorian Serie A club Emelec and the Ecuador national under-20 football team as a defender.

== Club career ==
Valencia trained as a youth player at Independiente del Valle, C.D. Clan Juvenil and C.S. Norte América before settling at LDU Quito in 2020. Valencia made his debut in the Ecuadorian Serie A on 21 December 2020 appearing as a substitute for Quito against C.D. Técnico Universitario.

In 2022 a percentage of his registration was bought by Mexican side Club Universidad Nacional and he joined their subsidiary team Pumas Tabasco in Mexico second division. Valencia made his debut in the Liga de Expansión MX for Pumas Tabasco on 25 July 2022 against Atlético Morelia.

== International career ==
Valencia was included in the Ecuador national under-20 football team for the 2023 FIFA U-20 World Cup held in Argentina in May 2023.
