= Victor Eletu =

Nigerian footballer, born 2005

Personal information
- Full name: Victor Ehuwa Eletu
- Date of birth: 1 April 2005 (age 21)
- Place of birth: Lagos, Nigeria
- Height: 1.76 m (5 ft 9 in)
- Position: Defensive midfielder

Team information
- Current team: Pescara
- Number: 6

Youth career
- Prince Kazeem Eletu Academy
- –2022: Cedratese 1985
- 2021–2022: → AC Milan (loan)
- 2022–2025: AC Milan

Senior career*
Years	Team	Apps	(Gls)
2024–2026	AC Milan	0	(0)
2024–2026	Milan Futuro (res.)	31	(2)
2026–	Pescara	0	(0)

International career^{‡}
2023	Nigeria U20	5	(0)
- * Club domestic league appearances and goals as of 22:30, 10 May 2026 (UTC) ‡ National team caps and goals as of 09:02, 13 November 2023 (UTC)

Victor Ehuwa Eletu (born 1 April 2005) is a Nigerian professional footballer who plays as a defensive midfielder for Serie C Group B club Pescara.

== Club career ==
=== AC Milan ===
Born in Lagos, Nigeria, Eletu spent time as a youngster at Prince Kazeem Eletu Academy in his hometown before earning a scholarship with AC Milan in 2018.

Playing for the AC Milan under-19 team, Eletu made consistent appearances primarily playing as a deep lying midfielder in 2022. In December 2022 he signed a new two-and-a-half-year contract with AC Milan. Eletu was promoted to the role of U19 captain during the 2022–23 season.

On 11 February 2024, he received his first call-up with the AC Milan senior team for a 1–0 home win Serie A match against Napoli, as an unused substitute. He was called-up again on 15 February 2024, for a 3–0 home win UEFA Europa League knockout play-offs match against French club Rennes, but yet to make his debut.

On 27 November 2024, Eletu received his first call-up with the newly created AC Milan reserve team Milan Futuro, as an unused substitute however, for a 1–0 away win Coppa Italia Serie C round of 16 match against Torres.

He made his professional debut with Milan Futuro on 23 April 2025, substituting Mattia Malaspina for a 3–2 away loss Serie C match against Gubbio. Four days later he made his first start for a 1–1 home draw Serie C match against Vis Pesaro, on April 27.

On 6 August 2025, Eletu signed a contract with AC Milan until 2027, with the option of another year.

He was called up by first team head coach Massimiliano Allegri for the pre-season friendly match against Premier League club Leeds United on 9 August 2025. Eletu came off the bench at the second half, substituting Ardon Jashari for a 1–1 draw.

On 11 January 2026, he captained Milan Futuro for the first time, during a 1–0 home loss Serie D match against Pavia.

=== Pescara ===
On 14 August 2026, Eletu moved to Serie C club Pescara, on a permanent transfer, ahead of the 2026–27 season.

== International career ==
In May 2023 he was named in the Nigeria squad for the 2023 FIFA U-20 World Cup.

== Career statistics ==
As of match played 10 May 2026

Appearances and goals by club, season and competition
Club	Season	League			Cup		Continental		Other		Total	
Club	Season	Division	Apps	Goals	Apps	Goals	Apps	Goals	Apps	Goals	Apps	Goals
AC Milan	2023–24	Serie A	0	0	0	0	0	0	—		0	0
AC Milan	Total		0	0	0	0	0	0	—		0	0
Milan Futuro	2024–25	Serie C	2	0	0	0	—		2 (Note: Appearances in Serie C play-out)	0	4	0
Milan Futuro	2025–26	Serie D	29	2	2 (Note: Appearances in Coppa Italia Serie D)	0	—		0	0	31	2
Milan Futuro	Total		31	2	2	0	—		2	0	35	2
Career total			31	2	2	0	0	0	2	0	35	2
