= Souleymane Faye (footballer) =

Senegalese footballer (born 2003)

Personal information
- Date of birth: 8 February 2003 (age 23)
- Place of birth: Dakar, Senegal
- Height: 1.79 m (5 ft 10 in)
- Position: Winger

Team information
- Current team: Lorient (on loan from Sporting CP)
- Number: 19

Senior career*
Years	Team	Apps	(Gls)
2021–2022	Galaxy Dakar		
2022	→ Granada B (loan)	14	(0)
2022–2024	Talavera	29	(1)
2023–2024	→ Betis B (loan)	14	(1)
2024–2025	Betis B	36	(9)
2025–2026	Granada	19	(2)
2026–	Sporting CP	5	(0)
2026–	→ Lorient (loan)	0	(0)

International career
2019	Senegal U17	6	(2)
2023	Senegal U20	9	(2)
2023	Senegal	1	(0)
- * Club domestic league appearances and goals as of 25 May 2026

Souleymane Faye (born 8 February 2003) is a Senegalese professional footballer who plays as a winger for Ligue 1 club Lorient on loan from Primeira Liga club Sporting CP.

== Club career ==
=== Early career ===
Born in Dakar, Faye played for hometown side Galaxy Football Academy before moving abroad on 25 January 2022, joining Spanish side Granada CF on loan and being assigned to the reserves in Segunda División RFEF. In July, he signed a permanent deal with Primera Federación side CF Talavera de la Reina.

=== Betis ===
On 12 July 2023, after scoring once in 29 matches as Talavera suffered relegation, Faye moved to Real Betis' reserves in the fourth division, on a season-long loan. He scored two goals and three assists in 18 appearances for the team throughout the 2023–24 campaign, before signing a permanent four-year contract with the club on 9 July 2024.

=== Granada ===
On 8 July 2025, Faye returned to Granada on a four-year deal, now for the first team; the club paid a rumoured fee of €600,000 for 50% of his economic rights belonging to Betis, while the other half still remains linked to Talavera. He made his professional debut on 22 August, starting in a 3–0 away loss to SD Eibar.

Faye scored his first professional goals on 4 October 2025, netting a brace in a 5–2 home routing of Real Sociedad B.

=== Sporting CP ===
On 21 January 2026, Faye moved to Portugal, joining Primeira Liga club Sporting CP on a four-and-a-half-year contract for a fee reported to be around €6.5 million, with his release clause set at €80 million. He made his debut on 1 February, coming on as a substitute during the second-half of a 2–1 league victory at home to Nacional.

== International career ==
Faye was part of the Senegal under-20 national team squad that took part in the 2023 U-20 Africa Cup of Nations. He scored Senegal's first goal of the tournament in a 1–0 win over Nigeria, and was the player of the match of the final on 11 March, where he scored the opening goal as Senegal beat The Gambia 2–0.

On 5 September 2023, Faye received his first call-up to the Senegal senior national team for an Africa Cup of Nations qualification match against Rwanda. He made his full international debut four days later, replacing Bouly Junior Sambou late into a 1–1 draw at the Diamniadio Olympic Stadium in his hometown.

== Career statistics ==
=== Club ===
As of match played 1 February 2026

Appearances and goals by club, season and competition
Club	Season	League			National cup		Continental		Other		Total	
Club	Season	Division	Apps	Goals	Apps	Goals	Apps	Goals	Apps	Goals	Apps	Goals
Granada B (loan)	2021–22	Segunda División RFEF	14	0	—		—		—		14	0
Talavera	2022–23	Primera Federación	29	1	—		—		—		29	1
Betis B (loan)	2023–24	Segunda Federación	14	1	—		—		4 (Note: Appearances in Segunda Federación promotion play-offs)	1	18	2
Betis B	2024–25	Primera Federación	36	9	—		—		—		36	9
Granada	2025–26	Segunda División	19	2	2	0	—		—		21	2
Sporting CP	2025–26	Primeira Liga	1	0	0	0	0	0	0	0	1	0
Career total			113	13	2	0	0	0	4	1	119	14

=== International ===
As of match played 9 September 2023

Appearances and goals by national team and year
National team	Year	Apps	Goals
Senegal	2023	1	0
Total		1	0

== Honours ==
Senegal U20

- U-20 Africa Cup of Nations: 2023
