= Diyor Ortikboev =

Uzbek footballer

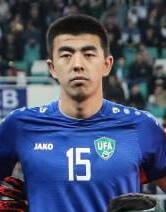

Personal information
- Date of birth: 6 January 2003 (age 23)
- Place of birth: Bukhara
- Height: 1.80 m (5 ft 11 in)
- Position: Defender

Team information
- Current team: Xorazm

Diyor Ortikboev (Uzbek: Diyor Ortiqboyev; born 6 January 2003, Bukhara) is an Uzbek footballer. He plays as a right-back for the club Khorazm.

Grew up in youth team of Pakhtakor Tashkent. Spent the 2023 season with his hometown club. Now he is a key defensive figure for Khorazm.

Played 4 matches during the 2023 FIFA U-20 World Cup, helping Uzbekistan reach the knockout stages. Currently part of Uzbekistan U-23 team.

== Statistics ==
Diyor Ortiqboyev club statistics
Season	Club	Apps	Goals
2026	Xorazm	2	1
2025	Xorazm	15	0
2025	Paxtakor	10	0
2024	Paxtakor	24	1
2023	Bukhara	12	0

Diyor Ortikboev international statistics
Year	National team	Competition	Apps	Goals
2025	Uzbekistan U-23	Friendly matches	2	0
2025	Uzbekistan U-22	Friendly matches	2	0
2024	Uzbekistan U-21	Friendly matches	1	0
2023	Uzbekistan U-20	FIFA U-20 World Cup	4	0
2023	Uzbekistan U-20	AFC U-20 Asian Cup	6	0
2023	Uzbekistan U-20	Friendly matches	1	0
Total			16	0
