= Federico Gomes Gerth =

Argentine footballer

Personal information
- Full name: Federico Gomes Gerth
- Date of birth: 5 March 2004 (age 22)
- Place of birth: San Isidro, Argentina
- Height: 1.94 m (6 ft 4 in)
- Position: Goalkeeper

Team information
- Current team: Unión Santa Fe

Youth career
- –2021: Tigre

Senior career*
Years	Team	Apps	(Gls)
2021–2024	Tigre	0	(0)
2024–2025	Académico de Viseu	3	(0)
2025–	Unión Santa Fe	0	(0)

International career^{‡}
2019	Argentina U15	4	(0)
2022–	Argentina U20	17	(0)
- * Club domestic league appearances and goals as of 17:00, 8 October 2025 (UTC) ‡ National team caps and goals as of 18:42, 10 February 2024 (UTC)

Federico Gomes Gerth (born 5 March 2004) is an Argentine professional footballer who plays as a goalkeeper for Argentine Primera División club Unión Santa Fe.

== Early life ==
Gomes Gerth was born in San Isidro, in the northern part of Buenos Aires, and began to play at the Tigre academy from the age of 8. He is nicknamed "Chiquito" despite being close to two metres in height.

== Club career ==
Gomes Gerth was under contract at Tigre until December 2024. As well as his height being an aid for a goalkeeper, he has a reputation for being a good footballer with the ball at his feet. He is said to be an admirer of Rogério Ceni and Jose Luis Chilavert.

On 31 January 2024, Gomes Gerth signed a three-and-a-half-year contract with Liga Portugal 2 club Académico de Viseu.

On 25 July 2025, Gomes Gerth returned to Argentina to join Unión Santa Fe as a free agent, signing an 18-month contract.

== International career ==
In November 2021, Gomes Gerth was called up to the senior Argentine national squad for World Cup qualifying matches against Uruguay and Brazil. He had previously played for the Argentine U17 team.

Gomes Gerth was selected to train and live with the Argentina squad in Qatar at the 2022 FIFA World Cup. He was called the “27th player” in the squad. He said of Lionel Messi: “he included me in everything and made me feel part of the achievement.” As well as training with the first team squad as a sparring partner the intention was for him to soak up the experience and learn what it takes to be a goalkeeper at the highest stage.

He was named in the Argentina under-20 squad by Javier Mascherano for the 2023 South American U-20 Championship held in Colombia in January and February 2023.
