= Titus Ssematimba =

Ugandan footballer (born 2003)

Personal information
- Date of birth: 15 August 2003 (age 23)
- Place of birth: Kampala, Uganda
- Height: 1.79 m (5 ft 10 in)
- Position: Attacking midfielder

Team information
- Current team: Kitara FC
- Number: 22

Senior career*
Years	Team	Apps	(Gls)
–2021	Black Star Football Club		
2021–	Wakiso Giants FC		
- Kitara FC

International career^{‡}
2022–	Uganda U20	5	(2)
2022–	Uganda U23		
2022–	Uganda	2	(1)
- * Club domestic league appearances and goals as of 14:25, 08 December 2022 (UTC) ‡ National team caps and goals as of 14:45, 08 October 2022 (UTC)

Titus Ssematimba (born 15 August 2003) is a Ugandan footballer who plays for NEC FC in the Uganda Premier League and the Uganda national team as an attacking midfielder. During the 2022 CECAFA U-20 Championship in Sudan, Ssematimba was named the player of the tournament.

== Career ==
=== Wakiso Giants FC ===
In September 2021, Ssematimba was unveiled at Wakiso Giants FC from the regional side of Black Star FC in Kampala region. On 3 November 2021, he made his debut for his side of Wakiso Giants FC as it dispatched off SC Villa 3-1 at the Kavumba Recreation Center where he bagged a brace in that match.

=== National team ===
==== Uganda U20 ====
Ssematimba played for Uganda U20 during the 2022 CECAFA U-20 Championship which was held in Sudan in 2022. He made his debut on 29 October 2022, against Tanzania U20 at Al-Hilal Stadium, Omdurman.

==== Uganda national football team ====
On 21 September 2022, Ssematimba made his debut on the Uganda during the Tri-national tournament against Libya.

==== International goals ====
Scores and results list Uganda's goal tally first.

No.	Date	Venue	Opponent	Score	Result	Competition
1.	21 September 2022	Martyrs of February Stadium, Benina, Libya	Lebanon	0–0	0–0	Tri Nations tournament
2.	24 September 2022	Martyrs of February Stadium, Benina, Libya	Tanzania	1–0	1–0	Tri Nations tournament

== Honors ==
U20 CECAFA player of tournament
