= Seydou Sano =

Senegalese footballer (born 2004)

Personal information
- Date of birth: 28 October 2004 (age 22)
- Place of birth: Dakar, Senegal
- Height: 1.94 m (6 ft 4 in)
- Position: Centre-back

Team information
- Current team: Al-Gharafa
- Number: 42

Youth career
- Racing Club de Dakar
- US Gorée

Senior career*
Years	Team	Apps	(Gls)
2022–2023	US Gorée		
2023	Braga	0	(0)
2023–	Al-Gharafa	47	(5)

International career^{‡}
2023	Senegal U20	10	(0)
2024–	Senegal	1	(0)
- * Club domestic league appearances and goals as of 17 January 2026 ‡ National team caps and goals as of 02:55, 27 August 2024 (UTC)

Seydou Sano (born 28 October 2004) is a Senegalese professional footballer who plays as a centre-back for the Qatar Stars League club Al-Gharafa.

== Career ==
Sano began his senior career with the Senegalese club US Gorée. On 16 May 2023, he signed with the Portuguese club Braga on a 3-year contract. On 22 August 2023, he joined the Qatari club Al-Gharafa. He made his senior and professional debut with Al-Gharafa in a 2–0 Qatar Stars League win over Al-Markhiya on 26 August 2023.

== International career ==
Sano was part of the Senegal U20s that won the 2023 U-20 Africa Cup of Nations. On 22 March 2024, he debuted with the senior Senegal national team in a friendly 3–0 win over Gabon.

== Honours ==
Senegal U20

- U-20 Africa Cup of Nations: 2023
