= Pape Demba Diop =

Senegalese footballer (born 2003)

Personal information
- Full name: Pape Demba Diop
- Date of birth: 4 September 2003 (age 23)
- Place of birth: Ouakam, Senegal
- Height: 1.78 m (5 ft 10 in)
- Position: Midfielder

Team information
- Current team: Strasbourg
- Number: 21

Youth career
- Diambars

Senior career*
Years	Team	Apps	(Gls)
	Diambars		(7)
2022–2025	Zulte Waregem	37	(7)
2025–	Strasbourg	7	(0)
2025–2026	→ 1. FC Nürnberg (loan)	10	(0)
2026	→ Toulouse (loan)	15	(1)

International career^{‡}
2022	Senegal U23	2	(0)
2023	Senegal U20	10	(6)
2023–	Senegal	3	(0)
- * Club domestic league appearances and goals as of 17 October 2026 ‡ National team caps and goals as of 16 November 2026

Pape Demba Diop (born 4 September 2003) is a Senegalese professional footballer who plays as a midfielder for French Ligue 1 club Strasbourg and the Senegal national team.

== Club career ==
Diop signed for Belgian side Zulte Waregem in September 2022, but would have to wait until October of the same year before he could train with his new side, due to work permit issues.

On 27 June 2025, Diop officially signed for French club Strasbourg for a fee of €7.5 million, including bonuses. On 31 August 2025, he was loaned out to German side 1. FC Nürnberg for the season. He was recalled by parent club Strasbourg on 6 January 2026, after 10 appearances for the club.

On 7 January 2026, Diop moved on a new loan to Toulouse.

== International career ==
Diop was called up to the Senegalese under-20 side for the 2023 Africa U-20 Cup of Nations. He scored in Senegal's 3–0 win over Mozambique, which sent Senegal through to the knockout stage.

== Career statistics ==
=== Club ===
As of match played 17 October 2026

Appearances and goals by club, season and competition
Club	Season	League			Cup		Continental		Other		Total	
Club	Season	Division	Apps	Goals	Apps	Goals	Apps	Goals	Apps	Goals	Apps	Goals
Diambars	2021–22	Senegal Premier League	—		0	0	3 (Note: Appearances in the CAF Confederation Cup)	0	0	0	3	0
Zulte Waregem	2022–23	Belgian Pro League	1	0	1	0	—		0	0	2	0
Zulte Waregem	2023–24	Challenger Pro League	10	1	—		—		—		10	1
Zulte Waregem	2024–25	Challenger Pro League	28	6	3	0	—		—		31	6
Zulte Waregem	Total		39	7	4	0	—		—		43	7
Strasbourg	2025–26	Ligue 1	0	0	—		0	0	—		0	0
Strasbourg	2026–27	Ligue 1	7	0	0	0	—		—		7	0
Strasbourg	Total		7	0	0	0	0	0	—		7	0
1. FC Nürnberg (loan)	2025–26	2. Bundesliga	10	0	—		—		—		10	0
Toulouse (loan)	2025–26	Ligue 1	15	1	4	0	—		—		19	1
Career total			71	8	8	0	3	0	0	0	82	8

=== International ===
As of match played 16 November 2026

Appearances and goals by national team and year
National team	Year	Apps	Goals
Senegal	2023	1	0
Senegal	2026	2	0
Total		3	0

== Honours ==
Senegal U20

- U-20 Africa Cup of Nations: 2023
- U-20 West B Zone Tournament: 2022

Individual

- U-20 Africa Cup of Nations Golden Boot: 2023
