= Alagie Saine =

Gambian footballer (born 2003)

Personal information
- Full name: Alagie Saine
- Date of birth: 20 January 2003 (age 23)
- Place of birth: Gambia
- Height: 1.85 m (6 ft 1 in)
- Position: Centre-back

Team information
- Current team: Horsens
- Number: 28

Youth career
- Falcons FC

Senior career*
Years	Team	Apps	(Gls)
- Falcons FC
2023	→ Horsens (loan)	0	(0)
2023–	Horsens	56	(2)

International career^{‡}
2020–2023	Gambia U20	13	(2)
2025–	Gambia	7	(0)
Medal record
Men's football
Representing Gambia
U-20 Africa Cup of Nations
Runner-up	Egypt 2023
Third place	Mauritania 2021
- * Club domestic league appearances and goals as of 14:24, 27 July 2026 (UTC) ‡ National team caps and goals as of 31 March 2026

Alagie Saine (born 20 January 2003) is a Gambian professional footballer who plays as a centre-back for Danish Superliga club AC Horsens and the Gambia national team. He was part of the Gambia squad that finished runner-up at the 2023 U-20 Africa Cup of Nations.

== Club career ==
Born in Gambia, Saine was formed by his local team Falcons FC before joining AC Horsens in January 2023 in a loan deal with an option to buy included. Despite not making any official appearances for the Danish club in the 2022-23 season, Horsens decided to trigger his buyout clause and thus signed him permanently, with the player signing a deal until June 2027.

== International career ==
Saine was called up to Gambia national under-20 team for the first time in 2020 to participate in the 2021 U-20 Africa Cup of Nations where his team reached the semi-finals. Saine was called up again to Gambia national under-20 squad for the 2023 U-20 Africa Cup of Nations and was chosen by coach Abdoulie Bojang to be the team captain. Gambia managed to reach the final for the first time in history but failed to win the title after the 0–2 defeat in the final against Senegal.

The results of the tournament qualified the Gambian team for the 2023 FIFA U-20 World Cup for the first time since 2007. Saine was named in the CAF Best XI Team of the Tournament.

== Honours ==
Gambia U20

- U-20 Africa Cup of Nations: runner-up 2023, third place 2021

=== Individual ===
- U-20 Africa Cup of Nations Team of the tournament: 2023
