= Jibril Othman =

Association footballer (born 2004)

Personal information
- Full name: Jibril Othman
- Date of birth: 26 April 2004 (age 22)
- Place of birth: Saint-Étienne, France
- Height: 1.83 m (6 ft 0 in)
- Position: Striker

Team information
- Current team: Saint-Étienne

Youth career
- 2010–2011: FCO Montrambert Ricamar
- 2011–2012: ASA Chambon-Feugerolles
- 2012–2022: Saint-Étienne

Senior career*
Years	Team	Apps	(Gls)
2022–	Saint-Étienne B	67	(23)
2022–	Saint-Étienne	3	(0)
2025	→ Francs Borains (loan)	9	(1)

International career
2022–2023	Tunisia U20	12	(2)
- * Club domestic league appearances and goals as of 9 May 2026

Jibril Othman (born 26 April 2004) is a footballer who plays as a striker for Ligue 2 club Saint-Étienne. Born in France, he represents Tunisia at youth international level.

== Club career ==
Othman joined the youth academy of Saint-Étienne in 2012. With 16 goals from 23 matches, he was his team's top scorer in the 2021–22 Championnat National U19 season. He made his senior team debut on 15 October 2022 as a 72nd minute substitute for Yvann Maçon in a 2–0 league defeat to Paris FC.

In January 2025, Othman joined Belgian club Francs Borains on a loan deal until the end of the season.

== International career ==
Othman is a former French youth international. In March 2020, he received his first call-up from France under-16 team for friendly matches against Luxembourg. However, those matches were called off later due to COVID-19 pandemic in France. In January 2021, he was called up to the France under-17 team to take part in a four-day internship and play unofficial matches against youth teams of Rennes and Guingamp.

On 19 September 2022, Tunisian Football Federation announced that Othman have chosen to represent Tunisia in international football. He made his debut for Tunisia under-20 team two days later on 21 September in a goalless draw against France.

== Personal life ==
Born in France, Othman is of Tunisian descent.

== Career statistics ==
As of match played 3 December 2022

Appearances and goals by club, season and competition
Club	Season	League			Cup		Other		Total	
Club	Season	Division	Apps	Goals	Apps	Goals	Apps	Goals	Apps	Goals
Saint-Étienne B	2021–22	Championnat National 3	4	2	—		—		4	2
Saint-Étienne B	2022–23	Championnat National 3	7	4	—		—		7	4
Saint-Étienne B	Total		11	6	0	0	0	0	11	6
Saint-Étienne	2022–23	Ligue 2	2	0	1	0	—		3	0
Career total			13	6	1	0	0	0	14	6
