= 1997 FIFA U-17 World Championship squads =

International football teams

== Group A ==
=== Egypt ===
Head coach: (Egypt) Dr. Mohamed Aly

No.	Pos.	Player	Date of birth (age)	Caps	Club
1	GK	Ahmed Ekramy	10 July 1980 (aged 17)		(Egypt) Al Ahly
2	DF	Gamal Abou AlKhair	27 October 1980 (aged 16)		(Egypt) Zamalek
3	DF	Yasser Hassan	11 February 1980 (aged 17)		(Egypt) Al Ahly
4	DF	Mohamed Mostafa	11 April 1980 (aged 17)		(Egypt) Al Ahly
5	DF	Khairy El Hefnaw	2 March 1980 (aged 17)		(Egypt) Zamalek
6	DF	Hany Said	22 April 1980 (aged 17)		(Egypt) Al Ahly
7	MF	Ashraf Abou Zaid	21 March 1980 (aged 17)		(Egypt) Al Ahly
8	MF	Ahamed Mostafa	1 January 1980 (aged 17)		(Egypt) Zamelak
9	FW	Ahmad Belal	20 August 1980 (aged 17)		(Egypt) Al Ahly
10	FW	Arabi Mahmoud	20 January 1980 (aged 17)		(Egypt) Mansoura
11	FW	Mohamed Aboul Ela (c)	16 January 1980 (aged 17)		(Egypt) Zamelak
12	DF	Ashraf Abdellatif	20 August 1980 (aged 17)		(Egypt) Zamelak
13	DF	Amr Ahmed	1 January 1980 (aged 17)		(Egypt) Al Marsy
14	MF	Mohamed Ezz	16 September 1980 (aged 16)		(Egypt) Al Mokawloon
15	MF	Mohamed Mahroos El Atrawy	19 August 1981 (aged 16)		(Egypt) Ghazl Mehalla
16	GK	ElSayed Abdelwahid	12 January 1980 (aged 17)		(Egypt) El Kroom
17	MF	Mohsen El Khatib	21 February 1980 (aged 17)		(Egypt) Mansoura
18	FW	Mohamed Fadl	12 August 1980 (aged 17)		(Egypt) El Said

=== Thailand ===
Head coach: (Thailand) Charnwit Polcheewin

No.	Pos.	Player	Date of birth (age)	Caps	Club
1	GK	Watcharapong Klahan	31 August 1978 (aged 19)		(Thailand) Thai Farmers' Bank
2	DF	Suppharoek Ngoenpradap	25 May 1980 (aged 17)		(Thailand) Royal Thai Air Force
3	DF	Attakorn Senpeng (c)	4 April 1980 (aged 17)		(Thailand) Assumption College
4	DF	Kanae Jan-im	25 June 1980 (aged 17)		(Thailand) Sasana
5	MF	Kay Langkawong	21 December 1980 (aged 16)		(Thailand) Thai Farmers' Bank
6	DF	Sittichai Titidachnarong	11 June 1980 (aged 17)		(Thailand) Thai Farmers' Bank
7	MF	Teerasak Po-on	18 May 1978 (aged 19)		(Thailand) Thai Farmers' Bank
8	FW	Sutee Suksomkit	5 June 1978 (aged 19)		(Thailand) Thai Farmers' Bank
9	FW	Bamrung Boonprom	22 April 1977 (aged 20)		(Thailand) Bangkok Bank
10	MF	Tom Tongdee	25 March 1980 (aged 17)		(Thailand) Thai Farmers' Bank
11	DF	Apichet Puttan	10 August 1978 (aged 19)		(Thailand) Rajpracha
12	MF	Montree Matong	16 August 1980 (aged 17)		(Thailand) Royal Thai Army
13	FW	Sataporn Vajakam	22 September 1980 (aged 16)		(Thailand) Thai Farmers' Bank
14	MF	Somchai Makmool	17 November 1980 (aged 16)		(Thailand) Royal Thai Police
15	DF	Tanongsak Prajakkata	29 June 1976 (aged 21)		(Thailand) Thai Farmers' Bank
16	MF	Issara Sritaro	18 January 1977 (aged 20)		(Thailand) Thai Farmers' Bank
17	MF	Kritsana Wongbudee	20 June 1980 (aged 17)		(Thailand) Thai Farmers' Bank
18	GK	Boonkong Akbut	27 August 1980 (aged 17)		(Thailand) Thai Farmers' Bank

=== Chile ===
Head coach: (Chile) Vladimir Bigorra

No.	Pos.	Player	Date of birth (age)	Caps	Club
1	GK	Marcelo Jélvez	23 October 1980 (aged 16)		Universidad de Chile
2	DF	Cristián Álvarez	20 January 1980 (aged 17)		(Chile) Universidad Católica
3	DF	Claudio Maldonado	3 January 1980 (aged 17)		(Chile) Colo-Colo
4	DF	Denis Montecinos	23 January 1980 (aged 17)		(Chile) Huachipato
5	DF	Pablo Díaz	23 May 1980 (aged 17)		(Chile) Regional Atacama
6	MF	Germán Navea	10 February 1980 (aged 17)		(Chile) Deportes La Serena
7	FW	Iván Alvarez	20 January 1980 (aged 17)		(Chile) Universidad Católica
8	MF	Alonso Zúñiga	23 March 1980 (aged 17)		(Chile) Colo-Colo
9	FW	Jorge Guzmán	28 March 1980 (aged 17)		Universidad de Chile
10	MF	Milovan Mirosevic (c)	20 June 1980 (aged 17)		(Chile) Universidad Católica
11	MF	Juan José Ribera	11 October 1980 (aged 16)		(Chile) Universidad Católica
12	GK	Patricio Vargas	2 August 1980 (aged 17)		(Chile) O'Higgins
13	MF	David Cubillos	12 January 1980 (aged 17)		(Chile) Colo-Colo
14	DF	César Pino	2 June 1980 (aged 17)		Universidad de Chile
15	MF	Rodolfo Madrid	14 May 1980 (aged 17)		(Chile) Colo-Colo
16	FW	Manuel Villalobos	15 October 1980 (aged 16)		(Chile) Colo-Colo
17	FW	Juan Francisco Viveros	11 August 1980 (aged 17)		(Chile) Huachipato
18	FW	Juan Pablo Úbeda	31 July 1980 (aged 17)		(Chile) Unión Española

=== Germany ===
Head coach: (Germany) Bernd Stoeber

No.	Pos.	Player	Date of birth (age)	Caps	Club
1	GK	Christian Wetklo	11 January 1980 (aged 17)		(Germany) Schalke 04
2	MF	Alexander Hauschild	17 March 1980 (aged 17)		(Germany) Chemnitzer FC
3	DF	Mathias Straub	24 November 1980 (aged 16)		(Germany) VfB Stuttgart
4	DF	Michael Zepek	19 January 1981 (aged 16)		(Germany) Karlsruher SC
5	DF	Jens Truckenbrod (c)	18 February 1980 (aged 17)		(Germany) Borussia Mönchengladbach
6	MF	Marco Christ	6 November 1980 (aged 16)		(Germany) 1. FC Nürnberg
7	MF	Carsten Sträßer	5 July 1980 (aged 17)		(Germany) Carl Zeiss Jena
8	MF	Sebastian Kehl	13 February 1980 (aged 17)		(Germany) Hannover 96
9	FW	Benjamin Auer	11 January 1981 (aged 16)		(Germany) 1. FC Kaiserslautern
10	MF	Sebastian Deisler	5 January 1980 (aged 17)		(Germany) Borussia Mönchengladbach
11	FW	Steffen Hofmann	9 September 1980 (aged 16)		(Germany) Bayern Munich
12	GK	Roman Weidenfeller	6 August 1980 (aged 17)		(Germany) 1. FC Kaiserslautern
13	MF	Sebastian Backer	5 September 1980 (aged 16)		(Germany) Bayern Munich
14	MF	Oliver Dittrich	16 April 1980 (aged 17)		(Germany) Bayer Leverkusen
15	MF	Francis Bugri	9 November 1980 (aged 16)		(Germany) Borussia Dortmund
16	DF	Fabío Morena	19 March 1980 (aged 17)		(Germany) VfB Stuttgart
17	FW	Michael Miedl	10 July 1980 (aged 17)		(Germany) 1860 Munich
18	FW	Silvio Adzić	23 September 1980 (aged 16)		(Germany) 1. FC Kaiserslautern

== Group B ==
=== New Zealand ===
Head coach: (Republic of Ireland) Joe McGrath

No.	Pos.	Player	Date of birth (age)	Caps	Club
1	GK	Jamie Cross	11 March 1980 (aged 17)		(New Zealand) Hawkes Bay JFA
2	DF	Peter Hendriks	17 November 1980 (aged 16)		(New Zealand) Auckland JFA
3	DF	Todd Stembridge (c)	25 March 1980 (aged 17)		(New Zealand) Hawkes Bay JFA
4	DF	Ben Sigmund	3 February 1981 (aged 16)		(New Zealand) Canterbury JFA
5	MF	Nitesh Krishna	16 September 1980 (aged 16)		(New Zealand) Auckland JFA
6	MF	Mike Wilson	25 November 1980 (aged 16)		(New Zealand) Mana JFA
7	MF	Robert Clark	12 November 1980 (aged 16)		(New Zealand) North Harbour JFA
8	FW	Kenton McCarrison	4 September 1980 (aged 17)		(New Zealand) North Harbour JFA
9	FW	Rodney Mays	27 November 1980 (aged 16)		(New Zealand) Hutt Valley JFA
10	FW	Blair Scadden	26 August 1981 (aged 16)		(New Zealand) Canterbury JFA
11	MF	Joshua Stick	12 February 1980 (aged 17)		(New Zealand) North Harbour JFA
12	FW	Marc Foote	9 March 1980 (aged 17)		(New Zealand) Hawkes Bay JFA
13	MF	Daniel Aliaga	19 February 1980 (aged 17)		(New Zealand) Auckland JFA
14	MF	Greg Williams	30 November 1980 (aged 16)		(New Zealand) North Harbour JFA
15	MF	Jared Medhurst	28 January 1980 (aged 17)		(New Zealand) Auckland JFA
16	MF	Chris Root	1 December 1980 (aged 16)		(New Zealand) Counties-Manukau JFA
17	MF	Shaun Easthope	23 May 1981 (aged 16)		(New Zealand) Hutt Valley JFA
18	GK	Michael Osborn	10 December 1980 (aged 16)		(New Zealand) Hutt Valley JFA

=== Mali ===
Head coach: (Mali) Mamadou Coulibaly

No.	Pos.	Player	Date of birth (age)	Caps	Club
1	GK	Yacouba Koné	4 March 1980 (aged 17)		(Mali) Tata National
2	DF	Abdoulaye Coulibaly	17 April 1980 (aged 17)		(Mali) AS Real
3	DF	Sékou Fofana	26 September 1980 (aged 16)		(Mali) AS Commune II
4	DF	Adama Coulibaly	9 October 1980 (aged 16)		(Mali) Djoliba
5	MF	Sega Diakité	14 November 1980 (aged 16)		(Mali) AS Kolais
6	MF	Bakou Tounkara	13 June 1980 (aged 17)		(Mali) Djoliba
7	FW	Aboubacar Guindo	30 May 1981 (aged 16)		(France) AJ Auxere
8	MF	Mahamadou Diarra	18 May 1981 (aged 16)		(Mali) CSK Bamako
9	FW	Drissa Coulibaly	4 November 1982 (aged 14)		(Mali) Djoliba
10	MF	Seydou Keita	16 January 1980 (aged 17)		(Mali) CSK Bamako
11	MF	Youssouf Coulibaly	5 August 1981 (aged 16)		(Mali) Djoliba
12	DF	Amadou Coulibaly	5 December 1981 (aged 15)		(Mali) CSK Bamako
13	DF	Abdoulaye Camara (c)	2 January 1980 (aged 17)		(Mali) Onze Createurs
14	FW	Mamadou Diarra	8 January 1980 (aged 17)		(Mali) Stade Malien
15	MF	Sékou Koné	10 March 1981 (aged 16)		(Mali) CSK Bamako
16	GK	Bourama Dembele	30 November 1980 (aged 16)		(Mali) Djoliba
17	MF	Alfousseini Karambe	2 December 1980 (aged 16)		(France) AJ Auxere
18	GK	Mamadou Thiam	7 April 1981 (aged 16)		(Mali) CSK Bamako

=== Mexico ===
Head coach: (Mexico) Jorge Vantolra

No.	Pos.	Player	Date of birth (age)	Caps	Club
1	GK	Jesús Corona	26 January 1981 (aged 16)		(Mexico) Atlas
2	DF	Mario Peña	5 July 1980 (aged 17)		(Mexico) UNAM
3	DF	Pedro Peñaloza	19 March 1980 (aged 17)		(Mexico) UNAM
4	DF	Omar Jaime	20 April 1981 (aged 16)		(Mexico) Monterrey
5	DF	Saul Salcedo	8 October 1980 (aged 16)		(Mexico) Monterrey
6	MF	Santos Glodias	30 June 1980 (aged 17)		(Mexico) UNAM
7	MF	Juan Manuel García	18 February 1980 (aged 17)		(Mexico) Atlas
8	MF	Luis Pérez (c)	12 January 1981 (aged 16)		(Mexico) Necaxa
9	FW	José Osorio	4 November 1980 (aged 16)		(Mexico) UNAM
10	FW	Edwin Santibáñez	1 February 1980 (aged 17)		(Mexico) America
11	FW	Omar Gomez	6 January 1980 (aged 17)		(Mexico) Monterrey
12	GK	Jorge Espinosa	17 September 1980 (aged 16)		(Mexico) UNAM
13	DF	Ivan Bernal	9 May 1980 (aged 17)		(Mexico) Toluca
14	DF	Eduardo Rergis	31 December 1980 (aged 16)		(Mexico) Veracruz
15	FW	Fernando Arce	24 April 1980 (aged 17)		(Mexico) America
16	MF	Luis González	28 June 1980 (aged 17)		(Mexico) UNAM
17	MF	Ricardo Martínez	9 January 1980 (aged 17)		(Mexico) Monterrey
18	DF	Oscar Mascorro	11 February 1980 (aged 17)		(Mexico) Monterrey

=== Spain ===
Head coach: (Spain) Juan Santisteban

No.	Pos.	Player	Date of birth (age)	Caps	Club
1	GK	Iker Casillas	20 May 1981 (aged 16)		(Spain) Real Madrid
2	FW	Sergio Santamaría	16 July 1980 (aged 17)		(Spain) Barcelona
3	DF	Zuhaitz Gurrutxaga	23 November 1980 (aged 16)		(Spain) Real Sociedad
4	DF	Ander (c)	27 August 1980 (aged 17)		(Spain) Real Sociedad
5	DF	Juan José Camacho	2 August 1980 (aged 17)		(Spain) Real Zaragoza
6	MF	Corona	12 February 1981 (aged 16)		(Spain) Real Madrid
7	FW	Iván López	3 December 1980 (aged 16)		(Spain) Valencia
8	MF	David Sousa	3 February 1980 (aged 17)		(Spain) Real Madrid
9	MF	Nelo	20 February 1981 (aged 16)		(Spain) Valencia
10	FW	David	24 October 1980 (aged 16)		(Spain) Real Madrid
11	MF	Miguel Mateos	17 October 1980 (aged 16)		(Spain) Real Madrid
12	DF	Blas	10 September 1980 (aged 16)		(Spain) Lleida
13	GK	Daniel Roiz	24 June 1980 (aged 17)		(Spain) Racing Santander
14	DF	Iván Sánchez	7 August 1980 (aged 17)		(Spain) Real Zaragoza
15	FW	Iván Royo	5 August 1980 (aged 17)		(Spain) Real Zaragoza
16	DF	César Navas	14 February 1980 (aged 17)		(Spain) Real Madrid
17	MF	Xavi	25 January 1980 (aged 17)		(Spain) Barcelona
18	MF	Paco Gallardo	13 January 1980 (aged 17)		(Spain) Sevilla

== Group C ==
=== Oman ===
Head coach: (England) Colin Dobson

No.	Pos.	Player	Date of birth (age)	Caps	Club
1	GK	Badar Jumaa Al-Alawi	6 December 1981 (aged 15)		(Oman) Al Kamil
2	DF	Adnan Al-Araimi	17 April 1980 (aged 17)		(Oman) Al Orouba
3	DF	Juma Al-Mukhaini	9 April 1980 (aged 17)		(Oman) Al Orouba
4	DF	Zayidi Zayid	17 December 1980 (aged 16)		(Oman) Boushar
5	DF	Mohd Al-Hadabi	9 June 1980 (aged 17)		(Oman) Fanja
6	MF	Mahfoudh Al-Mukhaini	8 August 1980 (aged 17)		(Oman) Al Orouba
7	MF	Jamal Nabi	22 December 1981 (aged 15)		(Oman) Boshar
8	MF	Ahmed Ba	10 November 1981 (aged 15)		(Oman) Dhofar Salala
9	FW	Hashim Saleh	15 October 1981 (aged 15)		(Oman) Al Nasr
10	MF	Salah Al-Amri	2 July 1980 (aged 17)		(Oman) Mirbat
11	FW	Saif Al-Ghafri	26 February 1981 (aged 16)		(Oman) Dhofar Salala
12	DF	Mohd Jaman	10 May 1981 (aged 16)		(Oman) Al Ittihad
13	FW	Jabir Al-Saadi	3 March 1981 (aged 16)		(Oman) Barka
14	MF	Mohsin Al-Harbi (c)	22 September 1980 (aged 16)		(Oman) Sur
15	DF	Talal Al-Farsi	27 November 1980 (aged 16)		(Oman) Al Orouba
16	GK	Hassan Al-Naemi	20 July 1980 (aged 17)		(Oman) Suweiq
17	DF	Radhwan Nairooz	9 October 1980 (aged 16)		(Oman) Al Nasr
18	DF	Khalid Al-Yaarabi	27 February 1980 (aged 17)		(Oman) Nizwa

=== United States ===
Head coach: (United States) Jay Miller

No.	Pos.	Player	Date of birth (age)	Caps	Club
1	GK	Kyle Singer	6 August 1980 (aged 17)		(United States) St. Crox
2	DF	Aaron Thomas	21 July 1980 (aged 17)		(United States) FC Delco
3	DF	Danny Califf	17 March 1980 (aged 17)		(United States) Canyon Classic
4	DF	Beckett Hollenbach	17 February 1980 (aged 17)		(United States) FC Delco
5	MF	Kevin Wilson	25 July 1980 (aged 17)		(United States) Upland Celtic
6	MF	Luís González	14 July 1980 (aged 17)		(United States) Strike Force
7	DF	Nick Downing (c)	25 January 1980 (aged 17)		(United States) Crossfire Sounders
8	MF	Steve Totten	7 January 1980 (aged 17)		(United States) Princeton Union
9	MF	Nozomu Yamauchi	16 February 1980 (aged 17)		(United States) Raleigh Caps
10	FW	Charles Rupsis	21 April 1980 (aged 17)		(United States) Bolletieri Sports Academy
11	MF	Marshall Leonard	29 December 1980 (aged 16)		(United States) Atlanta Lightining
12	MF	Fausto Villegas	10 September 1980 (aged 16)		(United States) Redwood City
13	FW	Taylor Twellman	29 February 1980 (aged 17)		(United States) Scott Gallagher
14	FW	Matthew Monsibais	17 October 1980 (aged 16)		(United States) Upland Celtic
15	FW	Alberto Gutiérrez	5 June 1980 (aged 17)		(United States) Upland Celtic
16	FW	Gus Kartes	19 October 1981 (aged 15)		(Greece) Olympiakos
17	MF	Brian Purcell	6 February 1980 (aged 17)		(United States) FC East Bay
18	GK	Bryheem Hancock	1 March 1980 (aged 17)		(United States) FC Delaware

=== Austria ===
Head coach: (Austria) Paul Gludovatz

No.	Pos.	Player	Date of birth (age)	Caps	Club
1	GK	Hans-Peter Berger	28 September 1981 (aged 15)		(Austria) Wustenrot Salzburg
2	DF	Yalcin Demir	14 January 1980 (aged 17)		(Austria) BNZ Oberosterreich
3	DF	Bernd Kren	10 December 1980 (aged 16)		(Austria) Admira Wacker
4	DF	Christian Mikula	23 December 1980 (aged 16)		BNZ Austria Memphis
5	MF	Martin Stranzl (c)	16 June 1980 (aged 17)		(Germany) 1860 Munich
6	DF	Thomas Eder	25 December 1980 (aged 16)		(Austria) BNZ Salzburg
7	MF	Gerald Krajić	3 December 1980 (aged 16)		BNZ Austria Memphis
8	MF	Juergen Kampel	28 January 1981 (aged 16)		(Austria) BNZ Karten
9	FW	Christoph Froch	31 July 1980 (aged 17)		(Austria) SV Mattersburg
10	FW	Lukas Habeler	3 August 1980 (aged 17)		(Austria) Admira Wacker
11	FW	Michael Moerz	2 April 1980 (aged 17)		(Austria) SV Mattersburg
12	MF	Paul Scharner	11 March 1980 (aged 17)		BNZ Austria Memphis
13	DF	Thomas Schmidhuber	2 January 1980 (aged 17)		(Austria) BNZ Salzburg
14	MF	Ivan Kristo	4 February 1980 (aged 17)		(Austria) BNZ Vorarlberg
15	FW	Wolfgang Mair	17 February 1980 (aged 17)		(Austria) Tirol Innsbruck
16	FW	Alexander Ziervogel	20 January 1981 (aged 16)		(Austria) Admira Wacker
17	MF	Kai Schoppitsch	5 February 1980 (aged 17)		Austria Klagenfurt
18	GK	Klemens Schimpl	5 May 1980 (aged 17)		(Austria) Sparkasse Eintracht Wels

=== Brazil ===
Head coach: (Brazil) Carlos Cesar Ramos

No.	Pos.	Player	Date of birth (age)	Caps	Club
1	GK	Fábio	30 July 1980 (aged 17)		(Brazil) União Bandeirante
2	DF	Andrey	17 March 1980 (aged 17)		(Brazil) São Paulo
3	DF	Rogério	5 February 1980 (aged 17)		(Brazil) Palmeiras
4	DF	Fernando Santos	25 February 1980 (aged 17)		(Brazil) Flamengo
5	MF	Abel	17 July 1980 (aged 17)		(Brazil) Vasco da Gama
6	DF	Jorginho Paulista	20 February 1980 (aged 17)		(Brazil) Palmeiras
7	MF	Diogo Rincón	18 April 1980 (aged 17)		(Brazil) Internacional
8	MF	Ferrugem (c)	6 October 1980 (aged 16)		(Brazil) Palmeiras
9	FW	Fábio Pinto	9 October 1980 (aged 16)		(Brazil) Internacional
10	FW	Ronaldinho	21 March 1980 (aged 17)		(Brazil) Grêmio
11	MF	Matuzalém	10 June 1980 (aged 17)		(Brazil) Vitória
12	GK	Raniere	16 August 1980 (aged 17)		(Brazil) América MG
13	DF	Flávio	12 March 1980 (aged 17)		(Brazil) Fluminense
14	DF	Henrique	6 March 1980 (aged 17)		(Brazil) Vasco da Gama
15	MF	Gavião	2 February 1980 (aged 17)		(Brazil) Grêmio
16	MF	Adiel	13 August 1980 (aged 17)		(Brazil) Santos
17	FW	Geovanni	11 January 1980 (aged 17)		(Brazil) Cruzeiro
18	FW	Anaílson	8 March 1978 (aged 19)		(Brazil) Rio Branco-SP

== Group D ==
=== Argentina ===
Head coach: (Argentina) José Pekerman

No.	Pos.	Player	Date of birth (age)	Caps	Club
1	GK	Franco Costanzo	5 September 1980 (aged 16)		(Argentina) River Plate
2	DF	Cristian Grabinski	12 January 1980 (aged 17)		(Argentina) Newell's Old Boys
3	DF	Roberto Chaparro	30 April 1980 (aged 17)		(Argentina) Huracán
4	DF	Juan Ramón Fernández	5 March 1980 (aged 17)		(Argentina) Estudiantes de La Plata
5	MF	Guillermo Pereyra	20 February 1980 (aged 17)		(Argentina) River Plate
6	DF	Gabriel Milito	7 September 1980 (aged 16)		(Argentina) Independiente
7	FW	Julio Marchant	11 January 1980 (aged 17)		(Argentina) Boca Juniors
8	MF	Maximiliano Cejas	7 February 1980 (aged 17)		(Argentina) Estudiantes de La Plata
9	FW	Luciano Galletti	9 April 1980 (aged 17)		(Argentina) Estudiantes de La Plata
10	FW	Livio Prieto	31 July 1981 (aged 16)		(Argentina) Deportivo Español
11	MF	Guillermo Santo	4 June 1980 (aged 17)		(Argentina) Platense
12	GK	Lucas Vivas	4 January 1980 (aged 17)		(Argentina) Lanús
13	DF	José Belforti	4 July 1981 (aged 16)		(Argentina) Argentinos Juniors
14	FW	Ernesto Farías	29 May 1980 (aged 17)		(Argentina) Estudiantes de La Plata
15	MF	Luis Zubeldía	13 January 1981 (aged 16)		(Argentina) Lanús
16	DF	Javier Almirón	9 February 1980 (aged 17)		(Argentina) Lanús
17	MF	Ezequiel González	10 July 1980 (aged 17)		(Argentina) Rosario Central
18	FW	Mauro Marchano	15 January 1980 (aged 17)		(Argentina) Rosario Central

=== Ghana ===
Head coach: (Ghana) Emmanuel Afranie

No.	Pos.	Player	Date of birth (age)	Caps	Club
1	GK	Osei Boateng	19 May 1981 (aged 16)		(Ghana) Great Olympics
2	DF	Isaac Owusu	6 September 1980 (aged 16)		(Ghana) Industria
3	DF	Abdul Razak	2 October 1980 (aged 16)		(Ghana) Ebusua Dwarfs
4	MF	Awule Quaye	24 September 1980 (aged 16)		(Ghana) Great Olympics
5	DF	Abdul Issah	4 November 1980 (aged 16)		(Ghana) Goldfields Obuasi
6	DF	Hamza Mohammed	5 November 1980 (aged 16)		(Ghana) Real Tamale United
7	FW	Wisdom Abbey	30 October 1980 (aged 16)		(Ghana) Goldfields Obuasi
8	MF	Abubakari Yakubu	13 December 1981 (aged 15)		(Ghana) Great Olympics
9	MF	Emmanuel Adjogu	2 October 1980 (aged 16)		(Ghana) Hearts of Oak
10	FW	Godwin Attram (c)	7 August 1980 (aged 17)		(Ghana) Great Olympics
11	MF	Aziz Ansah	7 October 1980 (aged 16)		(Ghana) Great Olympics
12	FW	Laryea Kingston	7 November 1980 (aged 16)		(Ghana) Great Olympics
13	FW	Johnson Eklu	17 September 1980 (aged 16)		(Ghana) Mighty Jets
14	DF	Akwasi Okyere	1 October 1980 (aged 16)		(Belgium) Anderlecht
15	DF	Daniel Quaye	25 December 1980 (aged 16)		(Ghana) Great Olympics
16	GK	Gariba Abubakari	21 November 1980 (aged 16)		(Ghana) Afienya United
17	FW	Michael Coffie	2 September 1980 (aged 17)		(Ghana) Ebusua Dwarfs
18	FW	Owusu Afriyie	1 September 1980 (aged 17)		(Ghana) Hearts of Oak

=== Costa Rica ===
Head coach: (Costa Rica) Armando Rodríguez Chacon

No.	Pos.	Player	Date of birth (age)	Caps	Club
1	GK	Jairo Villegas	16 February 1980 (aged 17)		(Costa Rica) Cartagines
2	DF	Sergio Molina	25 February 1981 (aged 16)		(Costa Rica) Liga Deportiva Alajuelense
3	GK	Adolfo Quesada	26 September 1980 (aged 16)		(Costa Rica) Santos de Guapiles
4	DF	Allan Melendez (c)	19 July 1980 (aged 17)		(Costa Rica) Saprissa
5	MF	Alonso Alfaro	16 March 1981 (aged 16)		(Costa Rica) Herediano
6	DF	Robert Arias	18 March 1980 (aged 17)		(Costa Rica) Herediano
7	MF	Fabío Vargas	6 February 1980 (aged 17)		(Costa Rica) Cartagines
8	FW	Esteban Santana	6 April 1980 (aged 17)		(Costa Rica) Saprissa
9	MF	Rodolfo Rodríguez	27 February 1980 (aged 17)		(Costa Rica) Saprissa
10	FW	José Ugarte	11 February 1980 (aged 17)		(Costa Rica) Municipal Liberia
11	MF	Mínor Díaz	26 December 1980 (aged 16)		(Costa Rica) Cartagines
12	MF	Eric López	2 May 1980 (aged 17)		(Costa Rica) Herediano
13	MF	Willy Hidalgo	29 April 1980 (aged 17)		(Costa Rica) Saprissa
14	FW	José Navarro	29 May 1980 (aged 17)		(Costa Rica) Cartagines
15	DF	Juan Esquivel	12 August 1980 (aged 17)		(Costa Rica) Saprissa
16	MF	Michale Monge	12 March 1980 (aged 17)		(Costa Rica) Saprissa
17	MF	Eddie Garro	18 April 1980 (aged 17)		(Costa Rica) Juventud Generaleña
18	GK	Carlos Rodriguez	3 January 1982 (aged 15)		(Costa Rica) Alajuelense

=== Bahrain ===
Head coach: (Bahrain) Aziz Amin

No.	Pos.	Player	Date of birth (age)	Caps	Club
1	GK	Abdul Karim	13 May 1980 (aged 17)		(Bahrain) Al Hilal
2	DF	Mohamed Husain	31 July 1980 (aged 17)		(Bahrain) Al Ahly
3	DF	Karim Sultan	19 April 1980 (aged 17)		(Bahrain) Busaiteen
4	MF	Khaled Yusuf	11 November 1980 (aged 16)		(Bahrain) Busaiteen
5	DF	Ali Ali	13 March 1980 (aged 17)		(Bahrain) Al Hilal
6	DF	Ebrahim Al Mishkhas	7 July 1980 (aged 17)		(Bahrain) Al Hilal
7	MF	Sayed Jalal (c)	5 November 1980 (aged 16)		(Bahrain) Al Hilal
8	FW	Ali Abdulla	5 February 1980 (aged 17)		(Bahrain) East Riffa
9	FW	Hasan Ahmed	22 February 1981 (aged 16)		(Bahrain) Sanabis
10	FW	Yaser Amer	15 May 1980 (aged 17)		(Bahrain) Isa Town
11	DF	Ateeq Saad	2 November 1980 (aged 16)		(Bahrain) Est Riffa
12	FW	Sayed Hameed	23 August 1980 (aged 17)		(Bahrain) Malika
13	MF	Ali Hadi	13 April 1981 (aged 16)		(Bahrain) Sitra
14	DF	Maitham Ahmed	4 July 1980 (aged 17)		(Bahrain) Al Hilal
15	FW	Salah Rashed	27 January 1980 (aged 17)		(Bahrain) Qalali
16	MF	Mohamed Salmeen	4 November 1980 (aged 16)		(Bahrain) Muharraq
17	DF	Rashid Al-Dosari	24 March 1980 (aged 17)		(Bahrain) Muharraq
18	GK	Ali Abdulla	26 September 1980 (aged 16)		(Bahrain) Al Ahly
