= 2005 CONCACAF Champions' Cup =

40th edition of premier club football tournament organized by CONCACAF

Tournament details
- Dates: March 9 – May 11
- Teams: 8 (from 6 associations)

Final positions
- Champions: (Costa Rica) Saprissa (3rd title)
- Runners-up: (Mexico) Pumas UNAM

Tournament statistics
- Matches played: 14
- Goals scored: 35 (2.5 per match)
- Top scorer(s): (Costa Rica) Rónald Gómez (3 goals)

The 2005 CONCACAF Champions' Cup was the 40th edition of the annual international club football competition held in the CONCACAF region (North America, Central America and the Caribbean), the CONCACAF Champions' Cup. The tournament was also a qualifying event for the FIFA Club World Championship. Qualifying began September 21, 2004 and final rounds took place in 2005.

Costa Rica's Deportivo Saprissa won the title with a 3–2 aggregate win over Mexico's Pumas UNAM in the final. Saprissa had advanced with dramatic wins, once in extra time and once on penalties. Saprissa qualified for the 2005 FIFA Club World Championship in Japan, finishing third.

This was the last time a non-Mexican team had won the CONCACAF Champions' Cup until 2022, when Seattle Sounders FC of the United States also defeated Pumas UNAM in the final. This is also the last time to date a team from Central America has won the Champions' Cup.

== Qualified teams ==
=== North American zone ===
(Mexico) Pumas UNAM - 2004 Clausura and 2004 Apertura champion
(Mexico) Monterrey - 2004 Apertura runner-up
(United States) D.C. United - 2004 MLS Cup champion
(United States) Kansas City Wizards - 2004 MLS Cup runner-up

=== Central American zone ===
(Guatemala) Municipal - UNCAF champion
(Costa Rica) Saprissa - UNCAF runner-up
(Honduras) Olimpia - UNCAF third place

=== Caribbean zone ===
(Jamaica) Harbour View - 2004 CFU Club Championship winner

== Bracket ==
Quarterfinals
(United States)	Kansas City Wizards	0	1	1
(Costa Rica)	Saprissa (a.e.t.)	0	2	2
(Mexico)	Monterrey	2	0	2
(Guatemala)	Municipal	1	0	1
(United States)	D.C. United	2	2	4
(Jamaica)	Harbour View	1	1	2
(Honduras)	Olimpia	1	1	2
(Mexico)	Pumas UNAM (a.e.t.)	1	2	3

Semifinals
(Costa Rica)	Saprissa (a.e.t.) (pen.)	2	1	3 (5)
(Mexico)	Monterrey	2	1	3 (3)
(United States)	D.C. United	1	0	1
(Mexico)	Pumas UNAM	1	5	6

Final
(Costa Rica)	Saprissa	2	1	3
(Mexico)	Pumas UNAM	0	2	2

== Quarterfinals ==
March 9, 2005

Kansas City Wizards (United States)	0–0	(Costa Rica) Saprissa

Arrowhead Stadium
Kansas City, United States
Attendance: 1,207
March 17, 2005

Saprissa (Costa Rica)	2–1 (a.e.t.)	(United States) Kansas City Wizards
Drummond 90', 96'		Burciaga 79'

Estadio Ricardo Saprissa
San Juan de Tibás, Costa Rica

Saprissa won 2–1 on aggregate.

March 9, 2005

Monterrey (Mexico)	2–1	(Guatemala) Municipal
Martínez 3'; Rotchen 43'		Muller 70'

Estadio Tecnológico
Monterrey, Mexico
Attendance: 20,000
March 16, 2005

Municipal (Guatemala)	0–0	(Mexico) Monterrey

Estadio Mateo Flores
Guatemala City, Guatemala
Attendance: 15,000

Monterrey won 2–1 on aggregate.

March 9, 2005

D.C. United (United States)	2–1	(Jamaica) Harbour View
Eskandarian 5'; Gros 64'		Shelton 23'

Maryland SoccerPlex
Germantown, United States
Attendance: 3,825
March 16, 2005

Harbour View (Jamaica)	1–2	(United States) D.C. United
Stewart 45+'		Walker 74'; Moreno 77'

Harbour View Stadium
Harbour View, Jamaica

D.C. United won 4–2 on aggregate.

March 9, 2005

Olimpia (Honduras)	1–1	(Mexico) Pumas UNAM
Palacios 48'		Alonso 83' (pen.)

Estadio Tiburcio Carías Andino
Tegucigalpa, Honduras
March 16, 2005

Pumas UNAM (Mexico)	2–1 (a.e.t.)	(Honduras) Olimpia
Botero 17'; Marioni 117'		Palacios 30'

Estadio Olímpico Universitario
Mexico City, Mexico
Attendance: 25,200

Pumas UNAM won 3–2 on aggregate.

== Semifinals ==
April 7, 2005

Saprissa (Costa Rica)	2–2	(Mexico) Monterrey
Gómez 45+' (pen.); Aleman 85'		Martínez 43'; Veiga 67'

Estadio Ricardo Saprissa
San Juan de Tibás, Costa Rica
April 13, 2005

Monterrey (Mexico)	1–1 (a.e.t.)	(Costa Rica) Saprissa
Casartelli 40'		Gómez 71' (pen.)
Penalties
	3–5

Estadio Tecnológico
Monterrey, Mexico
Attendance: 30,000

3–3 on aggregate. Saprissa won 5–3 on penalties.

April 6, 2005

D.C. United (United States)	1–1	(Mexico) Pumas UNAM
Gómez 10'		Da Silva 51' (pen.)

RFK Stadium
Washington, D.C., United States
Attendance: 21,185
April 13, 2005

Pumas UNAM (Mexico)	5–0	(United States) D.C. United
Marioni 11'; Beltrán 48', 73'; Toledo 85'; Lozano 88'

Estadio Olímpico Universitario
Mexico City, Mexico
Attendance: 22,000

Pumas UNAM won 6–1 on aggregate.

== Final ==
=== First leg ===
2005 CONCACAF Champions' Cup Final
May 4, 2005
Second leg

Saprissa (Costa Rica)	2–0	(Mexico) Pumas UNAM
Bolaños 21'; Badilla 43'	Report

Estadio Ricardo Saprissa, San Juan de Tibás, Costa Rica
Attendance: 20,000
Referee: Brian Hall (United States)

=== Second leg ===
May 11, 2005
Second leg

Pumas UNAM (Mexico)	2–1	(Costa Rica) Saprissa
Del Olmo 66'; Augusto 88'	Report	Gómez 33'

Estadio Olímpico Universitario, Mexico City, Mexico
Attendance: 40,000
Referee: Kevin Stott (United States)

Team details

Pumas UNAM
Saprissa

GK	(Mexico) Sergio Bernal
DF	(Paraguay) Darío Verón
DF	(Mexico) Israel Castro
DF	(Mexico) Jaime Lozano
DF	(Mexico) David Toledo	(substituted on) 46'
MF	(Mexico) Fernando Espinosa	(substituted off) 46'
MF	(Mexico) Gonzalo Pineda
MF	(Mexico) Leandro Augusto
MF	(Bolivia) Joaquín Botero	(substituted off) 78'
FW	(Brazil) José Aílton da Silva
FW	(Uruguay) Diego Alonso
Substitutions:
FW	(Mexico) Pablo Bonells	(substituted on) 78'
DF	(Mexico) Marco A. Palacios	(substituted on) 46'
MF	(Mexico) Joaquín del Olmo	(substituted on) 46'
Manager:
(Mexico) Hugo Sánchez

GK	(Costa Rica) José Porras
DF	(Costa Rica) Christian Bolaños	(substituted off) 75'
DF	(Costa Rica) Víctor Cordero
DF	(Costa Rica) Jervis Drummond
DF	(Costa Rica) Try Bennett
MF	(Costa Rica) Walter Centeno	(substituted off) 90'
MF	(Costa Rica) Alonso Solís	(substituted off) 68'
MF	(Costa Rica) Gabriel Badilla
MF	(Costa Rica) José L. López
FW	(Costa Rica) Rónald Gómez
FW	(Costa Rica) Juan Bautista
Substitutions:
FW	(Costa Rica) Allan Alemán	(substituted on) 68'
MF	(Costa Rica) (Guatemala) Saúl Phillips	(substituted on) 75'
DF	(Costa Rica) Andrés Núñez	(substituted on) 90'
Manager:
(Costa Rica) Hernán Medford

Saprissa won 3–2 on aggregate.

== Champions ==
CONCACAF Champions' Cup
2005 Winners

Saprissa
Third Title

== Top scorers ==
Rank	Player	Club	Goals
1	(Costa Rica) Rónald Gómez	(Costa Rica) Saprissa	3
2	(Costa Rica) Gerald Drummond	(Costa Rica) Saprissa	2
2	(Mexico) Ricardo Martínez	(Mexico) Monterrey	2
2	(Argentina) Bruno Marioni	(Mexico) Pumas UNAM	2
2	(Mexico) Joaquín Beltrán	(Mexico) Pumas UNAM	2
6	24 players		1
