= Ricardo Viveros =

Ricardo Viveros may refer to:

- Ricardo Viveros (footballer, born 1975), Chilean football manager and former forward
- Ricardo Viveros (footballer, born 1978), Chilean football forward and left-back
