= Juan Pablo Úbeda =

Chilean footballer (born 1980)

Personal information
- Full name: Juan Pablo Úbeda Pesce
- Date of birth: July 31, 1980 (age 46)
- Place of birth: Santiago de Chile, Chile
- Height: 1.82 m (6 ft 0 in)
- Position: Forward

Youth career
- Unión Española

Senior career*
Years	Team	Apps	(Gls)
1997–2002	Unión Española	76	(20)
1998–1999	→ Sampdoria (loan)	0	(0)
2000	→ Universidad Católica (loan)	31	(10)
2002–2004	Colo-Colo	76	(21)
2004	Ciudad de Murcia	16	(2)
2005	Alicante	0	(0)
2005	Unión Española	15	(6)
2006	Everton	18	(2)
2006	Palestino	18	(5)
2007	Zamora	0	(0)
2007	Virtus Lanciano	8	(1)
2007–2008	Palestino	25	(18)
2008–2009	Lobos BUAP	26	(9)
2010	Curicó Unido	8	(2)
Total		317	(96)

International career
1997	Chile U17	4	(0)
- * Club domestic league appearances and goals

Juan Pablo Úbeda Pesce (born July 31, 1980) is a Chilean former professional footballer who played as a forward.

== International career ==
Úbeda played for Chile at the 1997 FIFA U-17 World Championship in Egypt. Previously, he took part in the South American Championship.

== Personal life ==
As a football player, 'Ubeda was nicknamed Spiderman due to the fact that he used to put on a mask of this superhero to celebrate his goals.

Following his retirement from football, he developed a professional career in car racing. Through his maternal line, he has inherited this passion since his mother, Josefina Pesce, was a car racing champion and his uncle, Lino Pesce, was a F3 race driver who competed at the Autódromo Las Vizcachas in Santiago, Chile.

In 2013, Úbeda took part in the second season of the Chilean reality show Mundos Opuestos (Opposite Worlds).
