= 1997 FIFA U-17 World Championship =

1997 FIFA U-17 World Cup
FIFA U-17 World Championship Egypt 1997 بطولة العالم السابعة للناشئين لكرة القدم 1997

Tournament details
- Host country: Egypt
- Dates: 4–21 September
- Teams: 16 (from 6 confederations)
- Venues: 4 (in 4 host cities)

Final positions
- Champions: Brazil (1st title)
- Runners-up: Ghana
- Third place: Spain
- Fourth place: Germany

Tournament statistics
- Matches played: 32
- Goals scored: 117 (3.66 per match)
- Attendance: 633,000 (19,781 per match)
- Top scorer: (Spain) David (7 goals)
- Best player: (Spain) Sergio
- Fair play award: Argentina

The 1997 FIFA U-17 World Championship, the seventh edition of the tournament, was held in the cities of Cairo, Ismailia, Alexandria, and Port Said in Egypt from 4 to 21 September 1997. Players born after 1 January 1980 could participate in this tournament.

== Venues ==
| Cairo | Port Said | Alexandria | Ismailia |
|---|---|---|---|
| Cairo International Stadium | Port Said Stadium | Alexandria Stadium | Ismailia Stadium |
| Capacity: 74,100 | Capacity: 22,000 | Capacity: 20,000 | Capacity: 16,500 |
1997 FIFA U-17 World Championship is located in Egypt

== Teams ==
| Confederation | Qualifying Tournament | Qualifier(s) |
|---|---|---|
| AFC (Asia) | 1996 AFC U-17 Championship | Oman; Thailand; Bahrain |
| CAF (Africa) | Host nation | Egypt |
| CAF (Africa) | 1997 African U-17 Championship | Mali; Ghana |
| CONCACAF (North, Central America & Caribbean) | 1996 CONCACAF U-17 Championship | Mexico; United States; Costa Rica |
| CONMEBOL (South America) | 1997 South American U-17 Championship | Brazil; Argentina; Chile |
| OFC (Oceania) | 1997 OFC U-17 Qualifying Tournament | New Zealand |
| UEFA (Europe) | 1997 UEFA European Under-16 Championship | Spain; Austria; Germany |

== Matches ==
=== Group A ===
| Team | Pld | W | D | L | GF | GA | GD | Pts |
|---|---|---|---|---|---|---|---|---|
| Germany | 3 | 2 | 1 | 0 | 5 | 1 | 4 | 7 |
| Egypt | 3 | 1 | 2 | 0 | 5 | 4 | 1 | 5 |
| Chile | 3 | 1 | 1 | 1 | 7 | 4 | 3 | 4 |
| Thailand | 3 | 0 | 0 | 3 | 4 | 12 | –8 | 0 |

4 September 1997
20:30

| Egypt | 3–2 | Thailand |
|---|---|---|
| Belal 16', 46'; El Arabi 65' | Report | Bamrung 30' (Note: The official match report miscredited this goal to Tom Tongdee.); Sutee 67' |

Cairo International Stadium, Cairo
Attendance: 70,000
Referee: Horacio Elizondo (Argentina)

5 September 1997
20:30

| Chile | 0–1 | Germany |
|---|---|---|
| | Report | Adzic 81' |

Cairo International Stadium, Cairo
Attendance: 10,000
Referee: Ian McLeod (South Africa)

7 September 1997
18:15

| Egypt | 1–1 | Chile |
|---|---|---|
| Abou 37' | Report | Villalobos 69' |

Cairo International Stadium, Cairo
Attendance: 75,000
Referee: Gilberto Alcala (Mexico)

7 September 1997
20:30

| Thailand | 0–3 | Germany |
|---|---|---|
| | Report | Deisler 27'; Kehl 63'; Hofmann 84' |

Cairo International Stadium, Cairo
Attendance: 40,000
Referee: Victorino Rodriguez (El Salvador)

10 September 1997
20:30

| Egypt | 1–1 | Germany |
|---|---|---|
| Ezz 66' | Report | Auer 76' |

Cairo International Stadium, Cairo
Attendance: 80,000
Referee: Wilson de Souza Mendonca (Brazil)

10 September 1997
20:30

| Thailand | 2–6 | Chile |
|---|---|---|
| Montree 45+2'; Sutee 82' | Report | Viveros 41', 62'; Maldonado 52' (pen.); Mirošević 67'; Alvarez 83'; Zuniga 89' |

Ismailia Stadium, Ismailia
Attendance: 2,500
Referee: Jacek Granat (Poland)

=== Group B ===
| Team | Pld | W | D | L | GF | GA | GD | Pts |
|---|---|---|---|---|---|---|---|---|
| Spain | 3 | 3 | 0 | 0 | 17 | 2 | 15 | 9 |
| Mali | 3 | 2 | 0 | 1 | 7 | 2 | 5 | 6 |
| Mexico | 3 | 1 | 0 | 2 | 8 | 6 | 2 | 3 |
| New Zealand | 3 | 0 | 0 | 3 | 0 | 22 | –22 | 0 |

6 September 1997
18:15

| New Zealand | 0–4 | Mali |
|---|---|---|
| | Report | Guindo 33'; Mah. Diarra 64'; Keita 70', 88' |

Ismailia Stadium, Ismailia
Attendance: 9,000
Referee: Jacek Granat (Poland)

6 September 1997
20:30

| Mexico | 2–3 | Spain |
|---|---|---|
| Arce 66'; Santibanez 66' | Report | David 14', 84' (pen.); Mateos 31' |

Ismailia Stadium, Ismailia
Attendance: 9,000
Referee: Wilson de Souza Mendonca (Brazil)

8 September 1997
20:30

| New Zealand | 0–5 | Mexico |
|---|---|---|
| | Report | Martinez 12'; Salcedo 32'; Gomez 41', 47'; Santibanez 85' |

Ismailia Stadium, Ismailia
Attendance: 7,500
Referee: Abdul Aziz A. Al Dokhail (Saudi Arabia)

8 September 1997
18:15

| Mali | 0–1 | Spain |
|---|---|---|
| | Report | David 85' |

Ismailia Stadium, Ismailia
Attendance: 6,000
Referee: Horacio Elizondo (Argentina)

11 September 1997
20:30

| New Zealand | 0–13 | Spain |
|---|---|---|
| | Report | Sanchez 23', 29'; Mateos 28', 64'; Sergio 36' (pen.); David 43', 45+3', 47', 49'; Royo 62'; Ander 71'; Corona 87'; Lopez 90+1' |

Ismailia Stadium, Ismailia
Attendance: 5,000
Referee: Abdulhamid Radwan Abdulkareem (Egypt)

11 September 1997
20:30

| Mali | 3–1 | Mexico |
|---|---|---|
| D. Coulibaly 40'; Keita 54', 85' | Report | Perez 64' |

Cairo International Stadium, Cairo
Attendance: 5,000
Referee: Lubos Michel (Slovakia)

=== Group C ===
| Team | Pld | W | D | L | GF | GA | GD | Pts |
|---|---|---|---|---|---|---|---|---|
| Brazil | 3 | 3 | 0 | 0 | 13 | 1 | 12 | 9 |
| Oman | 3 | 2 | 0 | 1 | 8 | 4 | 4 | 6 |
| United States | 3 | 1 | 0 | 2 | 4 | 7 | –3 | 3 |
| Austria | 3 | 0 | 0 | 3 | 1 | 14 | –13 | 0 |

6 September 1997
13:45

| Oman | 4–0 | United States |
|---|---|---|
| Al-Harbi 15'; J. Al-Mukhaini 39'; Saleh 46', 52' | Report |

Alexandria Stadium, Alexandria
Attendance: 20,000
Referee: Mario Sanchez Yanten (Chile)

6 September 1997
16:00

| Austria | 0–7 | Brazil |
|---|---|---|
| | Report | Diogo 8'; Fábio Pinto 13'; Geovanni 16'; Ferrugem 38'; Matuzalém 44'; Ronaldinho 75' (pen.); Anaílson 85' (pen.) |

Alexandria Stadium, Alexandria
Attendance: 20,000
Referee: Abdulhamid Radwan Abdulkareem (Egypt)

8 September 1997
16:00

| Oman | 3–1 | Austria |
|---|---|---|
| Nairooz 18'; Saleh 45+1', 69' | Report | Ziervogel 74' |

Alexandria Stadium, Alexandria
Attendance: 19,000
Referee: Eugene Brazzale (Australia)

8 September 1997
13:45

| United States | 0–3 | Brazil |
|---|---|---|
| | Report | Jorginho 66'; Adiel 85'; Matuzalém 90' |

Alexandria Stadium, Alexandria
Attendance: 19,000
Referee: Rene Temmink (Netherlands)

11 September 1997
16:00

| Oman | 1–3 | Brazil |
|---|---|---|
| Saleh 53' | Report | Jorginho 50'; Fábio Pinto 66'; Geovanni 84' |

Alexandria Stadium, Alexandria
Attendance: 20,000
Referee: Gilberto Alcala (Mexico)

11 September 1997
16:00

| United States | 4–0 | Austria |
|---|---|---|
| Rupsis 6'; Twellman 56', 67'; Totten 82' | Report |

Port Said Stadium, Port Said
Attendance: 4,000
Referee: Mamadouba Engage Camara (Guinea)

=== Group D ===
| Team | Pld | W | D | L | GF | GA | GD | Pts |
|---|---|---|---|---|---|---|---|---|
| Ghana | 3 | 2 | 1 | 0 | 7 | 1 | 6 | 7 |
| Argentina | 3 | 2 | 1 | 0 | 3 | 0 | 3 | 7 |
| Bahrain | 3 | 1 | 0 | 2 | 4 | 8 | –4 | 3 |
| Costa Rica | 3 | 0 | 0 | 3 | 1 | 6 | –5 | 0 |

5 September 1997
13:45

| Argentina | 0–0 | Ghana |
|---|---|---|
| | Report |

Port Said Stadium, Port Said
Attendance: 30,000
Referee: Lu Jun (China)

5 September 1997
16:00

| Costa Rica | 1–3 | Bahrain |
|---|---|---|
| Esquivel 67' | Report | Al-Dosari 64' (pen.); Amer 79'; Rashed 84' |

Port Said Stadium, Port Said
Attendance: 20,000
Referee: Mamadouba Engage Camara (Guinea)

7 September 1997
16:00

| Argentina | 1–0 | Costa Rica |
|---|---|---|
| Galletti 59' | Report |

Port Said Stadium, Port Said
Attendance: 10,000
Referee: Terje Hauge (Norway)

7 September 1997
13:45

| Ghana | 5–1 | Bahrain |
|---|---|---|
| Eku 5'; Ansah 8'; Afriyie 52'; A. Quaye 77'; Abbey 89' | Report | Amer 71' |

Port Said Stadium, Port Said
Attendance: 20,000
Referee: Lubos Michel (Slovakia)

10 September 1997
13:45

| Argentina | 2–0 | Bahrain |
|---|---|---|
| Marchant 42'; Marchano 72' | Report |

Port Said Stadium, Port Said
Attendance: 10,000
Referee: Ian McLeod (South Africa)

10 September 1997
13:45

| Ghana | 2–0 | Costa Rica |
|---|---|---|
| A. Quaye 12'; Coffie 61' | Report |

Alexandria Stadium, Alexandria
Attendance: 8,000
Referee: Mario Sanchez Yanten (Chile)

== Knockout stage ==
Quarter-finals
14 September - Alexandria
Brazil | 2
Argentina | 0
14 September - Cairo
Germany | 0 (4)
Mali | 0 (3)
15 September - Port Said
Ghana | 4
Oman | 1
15 September - Ismailia
Spain | 2
Egypt | 1

Semi-finals
18 September - Ismailia
Germany | 0
Brazil | 4
18 September - Cairo
Ghana | 2
Spain | 1

Final
21 September - Cairo
Brazil | 2
Ghana | 1
Third place
21 September - Cairo
Spain | 2
Germany | 1

=== Quarterfinals ===
14 September 1997
16:00

| Brazil | 2–0 | Argentina |
|---|---|---|
| Fábio Pinto 44', 83' | Report |

Alexandria Stadium, Alexandria
Attendance: 20,000
Referee: Jacek Granat (Poland)

14 September 1997
20:30

| Germany | 0–0 (a.e.t.) | Mali |
|---|---|---|
| | Report |
Penalties
| Adzic (penalty scored); Deisler (penalty scored); Miedl (penalty scored); Truckenbrod (penalty scored) | 4–3 | (penalty missed) Y. Coulibaly; (penalty scored) Camara; (penalty scored) Guindo; (penalty scored) Karambe; (penalty missed) Keita |

Cairo International Stadium, Cairo
Attendance: 7,000
Referee: Lu Jun (China)

15 September 1997
16:00

| Ghana | 4–1 | Oman |
|---|---|---|
| Al-Mukhaini 25' (o.g.); Coffie 42'; Afriyie 79'; A. Quaye 88' | Report | Al-Amri 57' |

Port Said Stadium, Port Said
Attendance: 15,000
Referee: Rene Temmink (Netherlands)

15 September 1997
20:30

| Spain | 2–1 | Egypt |
|---|---|---|
| Sergio 28'; Camacho 66' | Report | Belal 31' |

Ismailia Stadium, Ismailia
Attendance: 13,500
Referee: Victorino Rodriguez (El Salvador)

=== Semifinals ===
18 September 1997
16:00

| Brazil | 4–0 | Germany |
|---|---|---|
| Adiel 4'; Geovanni 85'; Ferrugem 86'; Ronaldinho 88' (pen.) | Report |

Ismailia Stadium, Ismailia
Attendance: 8,500
Referee: Ian McLeod (South Africa)

18 September 1997
20:30

| Spain | 1–2 | Ghana |
|---|---|---|
| Sousa 35' | Report | Attram 47'; Afriyie 79' |

Cairo International Stadium, Cairo
Attendance: 4,000
Referee: Mario Sanchez Yanten (Chile)

=== Playoff for 3rd place ===
21 September 1997
15:30

| Germany | 1–2 | Spain |
|---|---|---|
| Adzic 59' (pen.) | Report | Ander 30'; Sousa 85' (pen.) |

Cairo International Stadium, Cairo
Attendance: 8,000
Referee: Victorino Rodriguez (El Salvador)

=== Final ===
21 September 1997
18:15

| Brazil | 2–1 | Ghana |
|---|---|---|
| Matuzalém 63'; Andrey 87' | Report | Afriyie 39' |

Cairo International Stadium, Cairo
Attendance: 35,000
Referee: Terje Hauge (Norway)

== Result ==
1997 FIFA U-17 World Championship winners

Brazil
First title

== Goalscorers ==
David of Spain won the Golden Shoe award for scoring seven goals. In total, 117 goals were scored by 73 different players, with only one of them credited as own goal.

7 goals

- (Spain) David

5 goals

- (Oman) Hashim Saleh

4 goals

- (Brazil) Fábio Pinto
- (Ghana) Owusu Afriyie
- (Mali) Seydou Keita

3 goals

- (Brazil) Geovanni
- (Brazil) Matuzalém
- (Egypt) Ahmed Belal
- (Ghana) Awule Quaye
- (Spain) Miguel Mateos

2 goals

- (Bahrain) Yaser Amer
- (Brazil) Adiel
- (Brazil) Ferrugem
- (Brazil) Jorginho
- (Brazil) Ronaldinho
- (Chile) Juan Francisco Viveros
- (Germany) Silvio Adzic
- (Ghana) Michael Coffie
- (Mexico) Edwin Santibanez
- (Mexico) Omar Gomez
- (Spain) Ander
- (Spain) David Sousa
- (Spain) Ivan Sanchez
- (Spain) Sergio Santamaría
- (Thailand) Sutee Suksomkit
- (United States) Taylor Twellman

1 goal

- (Argentina) Julio Marchant
- (Argentina) Luciano Galletti
- (Argentina) Mauro Marchano
- (Austria) Alexander Ziervogel
- (Bahrain) Rashid Al-Dosari
- (Bahrain) Salah Rashed
- (Brazil) Andrey
- (Brazil) Anaílson
- (Brazil) Diogo
- (Chile) Alonso Zuniga
- (Chile) Claudio Maldonado
- (Chile) Cristian Alvarez
- (Chile) Manuel Villalobos
- (Chile) Milovan Mirošević
- (Costa Rica) Juan Bautista Esquivel
- (Egypt) Eid Ezz
- (Egypt) Mahmoud El Arabi
- (Egypt) Saleh Abou
- (Germany) Benjamin Auer
- (Germany) Sebastian Deisler
- (Germany) Sebastian Kehl
- (Germany) Steffen Hofmann
- (Ghana) Aziz Ansah
- (Ghana) Godwin Attram
- (Ghana) Johnson Eku
- (Ghana) Wisdom Abbey
- (Mali) Aboubacar Guindo
- (Mali) Drissa Coulibaly
- (Mali) Mahamadou Diarra
- (Mexico) Fernando Arce
- (Mexico) Luis Ernesto Pérez
- (Mexico) Ricardo Mauricio Martínez
- (Mexico) Saul Salcedo
- (Oman) Juma Al-Mukhaini
- (Oman) Mohsin Al-Harbi
- (Oman) Rahdwan Nairooz
- (Oman) Saleh Al-Amri
- (Spain) Corona
- (Spain) Ivan Lopez
- (Spain) Ivan Royo
- (Spain) Juanjo Camacho
- (Thailand) Bamrung Boonprom
- (Thailand) Montree Matong
- (United States) Charles Rupsis
- (United States) Steven Totten

Own goal

- (Oman) Mahfoudh Al-Mukhaini (against Ghana)

== Final ranking ==
| Rank | Team | Pld | W | D | L | GF | GA | GD | Pts |
|---|---|---|---|---|---|---|---|---|---|
| 1 | Brazil | 6 | 6 | 0 | 0 | 21 | 2 | +19 | 18 |
| 2 | Ghana | 6 | 4 | 1 | 1 | 14 | 5 | +9 | 13 |
| 3 | Spain | 6 | 5 | 0 | 1 | 22 | 6 | +16 | 15 |
| 4 | Germany | 6 | 2 | 2 | 2 | 6 | 7 | –1 | 8 |
Eliminated in the quarter-finals
| 5 | Mali | 4 | 2 | 1 | 1 | 7 | 2 | +5 | 7 |
| 6 | Argentina | 4 | 2 | 1 | 1 | 3 | 2 | +1 | 7 |
| 7 | Oman | 4 | 2 | 0 | 2 | 9 | 8 | +1 | 6 |
| 8 | Egypt | 4 | 1 | 2 | 1 | 6 | 6 | 0 | 5 |
Eliminated at the group stage
| 9 | Chile | 3 | 1 | 1 | 1 | 7 | 4 | +3 | 4 |
| 10 | Mexico | 3 | 1 | 0 | 2 | 8 | 6 | +2 | 3 |
| 11 | United States | 3 | 1 | 0 | 2 | 4 | 7 | –3 | 3 |
| 12 | Bahrain | 3 | 1 | 0 | 2 | 4 | 8 | –4 | 3 |
| 13 | Costa Rica | 3 | 0 | 0 | 3 | 1 | 6 | –5 | 0 |
| 14 | Thailand | 3 | 0 | 0 | 3 | 4 | 12 | –8 | 0 |
| 15 | Austria | 3 | 0 | 0 | 3 | 1 | 14 | –13 | 0 |
| 16 | New Zealand | 3 | 0 | 0 | 3 | 0 | 22 | –22 | 0 |
