= Jorge Espejo =

Jorge Espejo may refer to:

- Jorge Espejo (Chilean footballer), full name Jorge Andrés Espejo Leppe, Chilean football full-back
- Jorge Espejo (Peruvian footballer), full name Jorge Luis Espejo Miranda, Peruvian football manager and former midfielder
