= Afriyie =

Afriyie is a surname. Notable people with the surname include:

- Adam Afriyie (born 1965), English politician
- Daniel Afriyie (born 2001), Ghanaian footballer
- Hannah Afriyie (born 1951), Ghanaian sprinter
- Kwaku Afriyie (born 1987), Ghanaian-German footballer
- Kolja Afriyie (born 1982), Ghanaian-German footballer
- Opoku Afriyie, Ghanaian footballer
- Owusu Afriyie (born 1980), Ghanaian footballer

== Given name ==
- Afriyie Acquah (born 1992), Ghanaian footballer
