= Santiago Silva =

Santiago Silva may refer to:

- Santiago Silva Álvarez (1896–1969), Chilean physician and politician
- Santiago Silva (footballer, born 1980), Uruguayan football forward
- Santiago Silva (footballer, born 1990), Uruguayan football forward
- Santiago Silva (footballer, born 1999), Uruguayan football goalkeeper
- Santiago Silva (footballer, born 2004), Uruguayan football midfielder
- Santiago Silva Retamales (born 1955), Chilean prelate of the Roman Catholic Church, bishop of Valdivia
