= List of AC Bellinzona players =

Below is a list of notable footballers who have played for AC Bellinzona. Generally, this means players that have played 100 or more league matches for the club. However, some players who have played fewer matches are also included; this includes players that have had considerable success either at other clubs or at international level, as well as players who are well remembered by the supporters for particular reasons.

| Name | Nationality | Position | Bellinzona career | Appearances | Goals |
|---|---|---|---|---|---|
| Mika Aaltonen | Finland | MF | 1979 | 25 | 12 |
| Amauri | Brazil Italy | FW | 1999–2001 | ? | ? |
| Igor Budan | Croatia | FW | 2001 | 1 | 0 |
| Horst Buhtz | West Germany | MF | 1959–1962 | ? | ? |
| Mark Edusei | Ghana | MF | 2000–2001 | 11 | 0 |
| Prince Ikpe Ekong | Nigeria | MF | 1998–1999 | ? | ? |
| Philippe Fargeon | France | FW | 1985–1986 | 42 | 34 |
| Alessandro Frigerio | Switzerland | FW | 1943–1947 | ? | ? |
| Cristian Ianu | Romania | MF | 2003–2007 | 121 | 65 |
| Ildefons Lima | Andorra | DF | 2009– | ? | ? |
| Mauro Lustrinelli | Switzerland | FW | 1994–2001, 2008–2011 | 241 | 143 |
| Marcone | Brazil Qatar | DF | 1998–1999 | ? | ? |
| Matuzalém | Brazil | MF | 1999 | 0 | 0 |

== Key ==
- GK — Goalkeeper
- DF — Defender
- MF — Midfielder
- FW — Forward

Nationality is indicated by the corresponding FIFA country code(s).
