= David Sousa =

David Sousa may refer to:

- David Sousa (footballer, born 1980), Spanish football midfielder
- David Sousa (footballer, born 2001), Brazilian football defender
