= Gustavo Viveros =

Chilean footballer (born 1947)

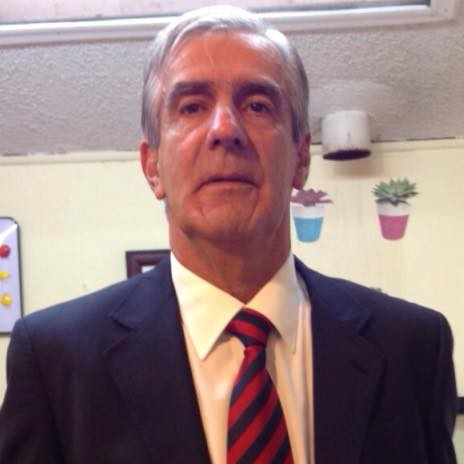
- Viveros in 2016

Personal information
- Full name: Gustavo Eduardo Viveros Le-Borgne
- Date of birth: 1 December 1947 (age 78)
- Place of birth: Concepción, Chile
- Position: Midfielder

Senior career*
Years	Team	Apps	(Gls)
1965–1971	Deportes Concepción		
1972–1973	Unión Española		
1974–1975	Deportes Concepción		
1976–1979	Rangers		
1980–1981	Magallanes		

International career
1971–1973	Chile	10	(2)
- * Club domestic league appearances and goals

Gustavo Eduardo Viveros Le-Borgne (born 1 December 1947), nicknamed El Flaco, is a Chilean former football player and coach who played as a midfielder.

== Career ==
Viveros was international with the Chile national team between 1971 and 1973. He played 10 games for the national team, scoring two goals against Argentina and Peru.

== Personal life ==
He is the uncle of fellow professional footballers Ricardo Viveros and Juan Francisco Viveros.

== Honours ==
Unión Española

- Chilean Primera División: 1973

Deportes Concepción

- Segunda División de Chile: 1967
