= Omar Israel Jaime =

Mexican footballer (born 1981)

Personal information
- Full name: Omar Israel Jaime Vera
- Date of birth: April 20, 1981 (age 45)
- Place of birth: Monterrey, Nuevo León, Mexico
- Height: 1.80 m (5 ft 11 in)
- Position: Defender

Senior career*
Years	Team	Apps	(Gls)
2003	Cruz Azul Hidalgo	2	(0)
2003–2004	Cruz Azul Oaxaca	7	(0)
2004	Jaguares de Tapachula	12	(1)
2005	Chiapas	1	(0)
2006–2009	Petroleros Salamanca	93	(1)
2009–2010	La Piedad	27	(1)
2010	Estudiantes de Altamira	11	(0)
2011	Correcaminos	7	(0)
2011–2012	La Piedad	24	(0)
2013	Estudiantes de Altamira	10	(0)
2013–2014	Deportivo Coatepeque	20	(0)
- * Club domestic league appearances and goals as of September 22, 2009 ‡ National team caps and goals as of September 22, 2009

Omar Israel Jaime Vera (born 20 April 1981) is a Mexican former footballer, who last played as defender for Estudiantes de Altamira as their captain in Liga de Ascenso.

== Career ==
Omar began his career in the Cruz Azul youth system, playing with Cruz Azul Oaxaca in 2003. He then made a move to Chiapas, where he played with their filial team, Jaguares de Tapachula. He eventually made his first team debut on 27 February 2005 in a 1–0 loss to Puebla FC.

Jaime later moved to Petroleros de Salamanca, where he anchored the team's defense and eventually went on to captain the team, leading them to the Apertura 2006 final, where Petroleros missed out on being promoted to the top flight by losing to Puebla, the team Jaime debuted against.

When Salamanca relocated to La Piedad, Omar Jaime left as well, bringing his captaincy with him.

== International career ==
Jaime was part of the Mexican U-17 squad in the 1997 FIFA U-17 World Championship held in Egypt. Mexico was grouped with Spain, Mali, and New Zealand. He did not see any action in the games, as Mexico was eliminated in the first round.
