= Maximiliano Cejas =

Argentine footballer

Personal information
- Full name: Maximiliano Roldán Cejas
- Date of birth: 7 February 1980 (age 46)
- Place of birth: La Plata, Argentina
- Height: 1.70 m (5 ft 7 in)
- Position: Midfielder

Team information
- Current team: ASD Ferentillo-Valnerina

Youth career
- Estudiantes de La Plata

Senior career*
Years	Team	Apps	(Gls)
1999–2001	Estudiantes de La Plata	7	(0)
2001–2002	Defensa y Justicia	?	(?)
2002–2003	Milazzo	15	(1)
2003–2006	Giugliano	70	(8)
2006–2008	Taranto	50	(2)
2008–2010	Benevento	49	(2)
2010–2011	Brindisi	11	(0)
2011–2012	Ternana	36	(2)
2012–2014	Latina	35	(3)
2014–2015	Forlì	31	(3)
2015	Olbia	3	(0)
2016	Casarano		
2016–2017	La Fiorita	22	(0)
2018–	ASD Ferentillo-Valnerina		

International career
1997	Argentina U17		
- * Club domestic league appearances and goals as of 30 March 2015

Maximiliano "Max" Roldán Cejas (born 7 February 1980 -La Plata- ) is an Argentine footballer who plays for ASD Ferentillo-Valnerina.

== Biography ==
Cejas started his career at hometown club Estudiantes de La Plata. After played 7 matches for Estudiantes, he left for Primera B Nacional side Defensa y Justicia.

In summer 2002, he left for Italy for Milazzo at Serie D. Players without EU nationality could only signed by Serie A or Serie B that season or played at non-professional level.

In the next season, he joined Serie C2 side Giugliano. His EU passport was solved after the start of season and made his league debut in January 2004. He was the regular starter for Giugliano.

In summer 2006, he left for Serie C1 side Taranto, where he played between regular starter and substitute player.

In 2008, he joined Benevento of Lega Pro Prima Divisione on free transfer.

On 5 December 2018, Cejas joined ASD Ferentillo-Valnerina.

=== International career ===
Cejas capped for Argentina U17 at 1997 FIFA U-17 World Championship.
