= Tácio =

Brazilian footballer (born 1980)

Personal information
- Full name: Tácio Caetano Cruz Queiroz
- Date of birth: 7 August 1980 (age 46)
- Place of birth: Valença, Bahia, Brazil
- Height: 1.72 m (5 ft 8 in)
- Position: Midfielder

Youth career
- 1992–1997: Vitória

Senior career*
Years	Team	Apps	(Gls)
1998	Vitória		
1998–1999	Venezia		
1999–2001	Vitória	36	(0)
2003	Goiás		
2003–2004	CRB		
2004–2005	Paysandu		
2006	Fluminense de Feira		
2007	Itabaiana		
2007	América (SE)	4	(0)
2007	Queimadense		
2008	Itabaiana		
2008	Joinville		
2008	→ Juventus (SC) (loan)		
2009	Fluminense de Feira	22	(2)
2009	Juazeirense		
2009	Sergipe		
2010	Paysandu	10	(0)
2011	Fluminense de Feira	15	(1)
2011	Atlético de Alagoinhas	10	(0)
2012	São Carlos		
2012	Atlético de Alagoinhas	23	(3)
2012	Ypiranga-BA	2	(0)
2012	Itabaiana	4	(0)
2013	Jacuipense	5	(0)
2013	Inter de Lages	8	(0)
2014	Ferroviário	8	(0)
2014	Atlético de Alagoinhas	8	(1)

International career
1997	Brazil U17		
- * Club domestic league appearances and goals

Tácio Caetano Cruz Queiroz (born 7 August 1980), better known as just Tácio, is a Brazilian former professional footballer who played as defensive midfielder. In 1997, he was part of the Brazilian team that won the 1997 South American Under-17 Football Championship.

== Biography ==
=== EC Vitória ===
Born in Valença, Bahia, Tácio started his career at Vitória. He played the 1998 1998 Copa do Brasil's edition and the Campeonato Baiano of that same season. In June 1998, he signed with A.C. Venezia along with Marcone and Bilica. He played once in 1998–99 Coppa Italia, a 1–1 draw with Juventus.

In January 1999, Tácio returned to Vitória, as his non-EU quota was transferred to newcomer Álvaro Recoba. Between 1999 and 2000, Tácio played 36 matches in Campeonato Brasileiro Série A and Copa João Havelange combined. He left the club in mid-2001, after playing the Campeonato Baiano and the Copa do Brasil of that season.

=== Brazil lower levels ===
Tácio signed with Paysandu in 2004, but left the club after two months. In December 2005, he joined Fluminense de Feira., where he remained until the end of the Campeonato Baiano of 2006. In October 2006, he signed a new contract with club, winning the Sergipe–Bahia Cup.

After the end of the Campeonato Baiano of 2007, Tácio joined Itabaiana, which won the Copa Governo do Estado de Sergipe. In July, Tácio signed with América (SE). The team failed to qualify to the second stage of the Campeonato Brasileiro's third division. In August, he left América to join Queimadense. The club won the Campeonato Paraibano's second division of 2007.

In February 2008, he returned to Itabaiana, finishing in the 4th position of the Campeonato Sergipano and getting to semi-finals of the Copa Governo do Estado de Sergipe. On 24 June 2006, Tácio signed with Joinville a 1 1/2-year contract, but immediately joined Grêmio Esportivo Juventus, on loan. The club finished as runner-up of the Campeonato Catarinense's second division.

In December 2008, Tácio returned to Fluminense de Feira, which finished the Campeonato Baiano's 2009's edition as semi-finalist. He scored two goals in the tournament. In July, he left the club to join Juazeirense, which finished as the runner-up of the Campeonato Baiano's second division. In August, he joined Sergipe. The club finished as the losing side of third stage of the Campeonato Brasileiro's fourth division (Série D) of 2009.

In October 2009, he signed with Paysandu. The team won the Campeonato Paraense of 2010 and got to the quarter-finals of the Campeonato Brasileiro's third division (Série C) of that season, when it was eliminated. In November 2010, Tácio signed once again with Fluminense de Feira.

== Honours ==
- Copa Sergipe–Bahia: 2006
- Campeonato Paraense: 2010
- Copa Governo do Estado de Sergipe: 2007
- Copa da Bahia: 2006
- Campeonato Paraibano – second division: 2007
- Campeonato Catarinense – third division: 2013

Brazil U17

- South American Under-17 Football Championship: 1997
