= Ricardo Viveros (footballer, born 1975) =

Chilean footballer

Personal information
- Full name: Ricardo Javier Viveros Kilman
- Date of birth: 21 April 1975 (age 51)
- Place of birth: Concepción, Chile
- Height: 1.81 m (5 ft 11 in)
- Position: Forward

Team information
- Current team: Universidad de Concepción (youth manager)

Senior career*
Years	Team	Apps	(Gls)
1994–1997	Huachipato	44	(8)
1998	Deportes Temuco	8	(4)
1998–1999	Argentinos Juniors	9	(1)
1999	Colo-Colo	3	(0)
2000–2001	O'Higgins	26	(9)
2002–2010	Universidad de Concepción	203	(39)
Total		293	(61)

Managerial career
- 2006–2019: Universidad de Concepción (youth)
- 2006–2012: Universidad de Concepción (assistant)
- 2019–2021: Nacimiento
- 2023: Nacimiento
- 2024–2026: Universidad de Concepción (youth)
- 2026: Universidad de Concepción (interim)
- 2026: Universidad de Concepción
- 2026–: Universidad de Concepción (youth)
- * Club domestic league appearances and goals

Ricardo Javier Viveros Kilman (born 21 April 1975) is a Chilean former professional footballer who played as a forward. He is the current manager of Universidad de Concepción's youth team.

== Playing career ==
Viveros played for clubs like Colo-Colo, Universidad de Concepción and Argentinos Juniors.

== Coaching career ==
Following his retirement, he worked for Universidad de Concepción both as coach of the youth ranks and the assistant coach of Yuri Fernández. In August 2019, he assumed as the head coach of Nacimiento CSDC in the Chilean Tercera B.

In May 2026, Viveros assumed as interim coach of Universidad de Concepción after Leonardo Ramos resigned. On 19 June, he was confirmed as the head coach. On 4 August, he returned to coach the youth ranks.

== Personal life ==
He is the nephew of the Chilean former international footballer Gustavo Viveros and the cousin of former footballer Juan Francisco Viveros.

== Honours ==
Universidad de Concepción

- Copa Chile: 2008–09
