= Badar Jumaa Al-Alawi =

Omani footballer (born 1981)

Badar Juma
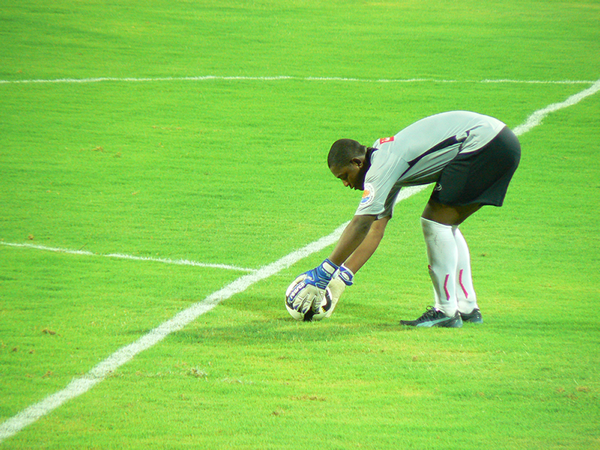

Personal information
- Full name: Badar Juma Subait Al-Alawi
- Date of birth: 6 December 1981 (age 44)
- Place of birth: Oman
- Position: Goalkeeper

Senior career*
Years	Team	Apps	(Gls)
1998–2012	Dhofar	?	(0)

International career
2000–2008	Oman	11	(0)
- * Club domestic league appearances and goals

Badar Juma Subait Al-Alawi (Arabic: بدر جمعة سبيت العلوي; born 6 December 1981), commonly known as Badar Juma, is an Omani former footballer who last played as a goalkeeper for Dhofar S.C.S.C. in the Oman Elite League.

== International career ==
Badar was selected for the national team for the first time in 2000. He has made appearances in the 2002 FIFA World Cup qualification and in the 2010 FIFA World Cup qualification and has represented the national team in 17th Arabian Gulf Cup, the 2004 AFC Asian Cup, the 2007 AFC Asian Cup qualification, the 18th Arabian Gulf Cup, the 2007 AFC Asian Cup, the 19th Arabian Gulf Cup, the 2006 FIFA World Cup qualification and the 2014 FIFA World Cup qualification.

Although he has not officially retired from the national team, and being still available for international duty, he has not frequently featured for the national team. The last time he represented the team was in a 2014 FIFA World Cup qualification match against Thailand.

Badar also played at 1997 FIFA U-17 World Championship in Egypt with fellow Dhofar S.C.S.C. teammate, Hashim Saleh.
