= Bryan Ogaz =

Chilean footballer

Personal information
- Full name: Bryan Ismael Ogaz Torres
- Date of birth: 9 June 2000 (age 26)
- Place of birth: La Pintana, Santiago, Chile
- Height: 1.73 m (5 ft 8 in)
- Position: Midfielder

Team information
- Current team: Universidad de Concepción
- Number: 16

Youth career
- Cobreloa

Senior career*
Years	Team	Apps	(Gls)
2019–2025	Cobreloa	71	(0)
2024	→ Deportes Santa Cruz (loan)	8	(0)
2025	→ Universidad de Concepción (loan)	29	(0)
2026–	Universidad de Concepción	9	(0)
- * Club domestic league appearances and goals as of 13 April 2026

Bryan Ismael Ogaz Torres (born 9 June 2000) is a Chilean professional footballer who plays as a midfielder for Chilean Primera División club Universidad de Concepción.

== Club career ==
Born in La Pintana commune, Santiago de Chile, Ogaz is a product Cobreloa and made his professional debut in the 1–0 away loss against Deportes Santa Cruz on 2 June 2019. After winning the 2023 Primera B, he was loaned out to Deportes Santa Cruz in January 2024 and returned to Cobreloa for the second half of the 2024 Chilean Primera División.

In 2025, Ogaz was loaned out again to Universidad de Concepción, winning the 2025 Liga de Ascenso. In December of the same year, he renewed with them for two years with views to the 2026 Liga de Primera.
