= Alonzo Zúñiga =

Chilean footballer (born 1980)

Personal information
- Full name: Alonzo Patricio Zúñiga Delgado
- Date of birth: 23 March 1980 (age 46)
- Place of birth: Santiago, Chile
- Height: 1.83 m (6 ft 0 in)
- Positions: Defensive midfielder; left-back

Youth career
- 1992–1997: Colo-Colo

Senior career*
Years	Team	Apps	(Gls)
1998–2002	Colo-Colo	56	(4)
2001	→ Santiago Wanderers (loan)	24	(1)
2003	Deportes Puerto Montt	51	(4)
2004	Santiago Wanderers	5	(0)
2004	Fénix	5	(1)
2005–2008	Deportes Concepción	49	(2)
2005	→ Vaduz (loan)	8	(0)
2006	→ Universidad de Chile (loan)	10	(0)
2006–2007	→ Deportes Antofagasta (loan)	30	(4)
2008–2009	Cobreloa	26	(1)
2009	Santiago Morning	2	(0)
2010–2011	Unión Temuco	47	(2)
2012	San Antonio Unido	–	(–)
Total		313	(19)

International career
1997	Chile U17	7	(2)
1998–1999	Chile U20		
- * Club domestic league appearances and goals

Alonzo Patricio Zúñiga Delgado (Spanish pronunciation: [aˈlonso ˈsuɲiɣa], born 23 March 1980) is a Chilean former footballer who mainly played as a midfielder.

== International career ==
In 1997, Zúñiga represented Chile at under-17 level in both the South American Championship and the FIFA World. At under-20 level, he took part of the squad in both the 1999 South American Championship and the 1998 L'Alcúdia Tournament. Chile U20 was the champion of L'Alcúdia Tournament.

== Honours ==
Colo-Colo

- Primera División de Chile (2): 1998, 2002 Clausura

Santiago Wanderers

- Primera División de Chile (1): 2001

Vaduz

- Liechtenstein Football Cup (1): 2004–05

Chile U20

- L'Alcúdia International Football Tournament (1): 1998
