= Mauro Marchano =

Argentine footballer

Personal information
- Date of birth: January 15, 1980 (age 46)
- Place of birth: Rosario, Argentina
- Position: Striker

Youth career
- 2001–2002: Rosario Central

Senior career*
Years	Team	Apps	(Gls)
2002	Central Córdoba	9	(2)
2003–2004	FC Libourne-Saint-Seurin	20	(10)
2004–2005	Cavese	24	(3)
2006–2007	Fidelis Andria	19	(11)
2007–2008	Catanzaro	25	(5)
2009–2010	Manfredonia		

International career
- Argentina U-17
- * Club domestic league appearances and goals as of ?

Mauro Marchano (born 15 January 1980 in Rosario) is an Argentine footballer. He plays as a striker. He also played for Italian Lega Pro Seconda Divisione team Manfredonia. He also represented his native country at the 1997 FIFA U-17 World Championship.

On September 13, 2009, his 30-year-old wife Juliana and 11-month son Theo were killed in a road accident as they were reaching Barletta to reach him for a football league game. The game was subsequently postponed due to these events.
