= Ricardo Viveros (footballer, born 1978) =

Chilean footballer

Personal information
- Full name: Ricardo Aquilino Viveros Farías
- Date of birth: 5 October 1978 (age 48)
- Place of birth: Quillón, Chile
- Position: Left wing-back

Youth career
- Cerro Porteño Quillón
- Huachipato

Senior career*
Years	Team	Apps	(Gls)
1997	Huachipato		
1998	Universidad San Sebastián		
1999	Magallanes		
2000–2002	Unión La Calera		(1)
2003	Unión San Felipe	13	(0)
2004	Deportes Puerto Montt	3	(0)
2005	Naval		
2006	Unión La Calera	28	(6)
2007	Deportes Concepción	7	(0)
2007–2008	IFK Norrköping		
2009	Lota Schwager	1	(0)
2009–2010	Chile Unido		
2011	Norrköping Bosna	20	(5)
2012–2015	Chile Unido	76	(11)
2016–2017	Azech SF	27	(7)
2020	Kimstad GoIF	3	(1)
2021–2022	FF Jaguar	3	(0)

Managerial career
- IFK Norrköping (youth assistant)
- * Club domestic league appearances and goals

Ricardo Aquilino Viveros Farías (born 5 October 1978) is a Chilean former footballer who played as a forward and left-back for clubs in Chile and Sweden.

== Playing career ==
As a youth player, Viveros was with club Cerro Porteño from Quillón and Huachipato. He began his career as a forward, but he turned into a left-back. In the Chilean Primera División, he played for Huachipato, Unión San Felipe, Deportes Puerto Montt and Deportes Concepción.

In his homeland, he also played for Universidad San Sebastián, Magallanes, Unión La Calera, Naval and Lota Schwager. As a member of Unión La Calera, he won the league title of the Tercera División in 2000.

In second half 2007, he moved to Sweden and joined IFK Norrköping in the Superettan. After suffering a serious injury, he returned to Chile in 2008.

In 2009, he returned to Sweden and went on his career at low categories playing for Chile Unido, Norrköping Bosna, Azech SF, Kimstad GoIF and FF Jaguar.

== Coaching career ==
He has worked for the IFK Norrköping youth system as fitness coach and assistant.

== Personal life ==
His son, Ricky, took part of the IFK Norrköping youth ranks.

Despite Viveros made his home in Sweden, he has a closeness with his city of birth, Quillón, also performing as an experience teller for the municipality.

== Honours ==
Unión La Calera

- Tercera División de Chile: 2000
