= 1997 South American U-17 Championship =

The 1997 South American Under-17 Football Championship was played in Paraguay from 28 February to 16 March 1997.

The host of the competition were the cities of Asunción, Pedro Juan Caballero and Encarnación.

Sandro Hiroshi was banned for 180 days in 1999 when it was discovered that his age had been falsified in the 1997 tournament. Brazil did not face team sanctions as the federation argued that Hiroshi acted without its authorization.

== First round ==
The 10 national teams were divided in 2 groups of 5 teams each. The top 2 teams qualified for the final round.

=== Group A ===
Team	Pts	M	W	D	L	GF	GC
Argentina	9	4	3	0	1	11	4
Paraguay	9	4	3	0	1	7	2
Venezuela	6	4	2	0	2	3	9
Ecuador	4	4	1	1	2	6	8
Peru	1	4	0	1	3	2	6

28 February 1997
Venezuela	2:0	Ecuador	Encarnación
Paraguay	1:0	Peru	Encarnación
2 March 1997
Argentina	6:0	Venezuela	Encarnación
Paraguay	1:2	Ecuador	Encarnación
4 March 1997
Ecuador	2:3	Argentina	Encarnación
Peru	0:1	Venezuela	Encarnación
6 March 1997
Argentina	2:0	Peru	Encarnación
Paraguay	3:0	Venezuela	Encarnación
8 March 1997
Ecuador	2:2	Peru	Encarnación
Paraguay	2:0	Argentina	Encarnación

=== Group B ===
Team	Pts	M	W	D	L	GF	GC
Brazil	8	4	2	2	0	8	3
Chile	7	4	2	1	1	9	3
Colombia	7	4	2	1	1	5	2
Uruguay	6	4	2	0	2	4	4
Bolivia	0	4	0	0	4	1	15

1 March 1997
Bolivia	0:2	Colombia	Pedro Juan Caballero
Brazil	1:1	Chile	Pedro Juan Caballero
3 March 1997
Brazil	4:0	Bolivia	Pedro Juan Caballero
Uruguay	1:0	Chile	Pedro Juan Caballero
5 March 1997
Bolivia	1:7	Chile	Pedro Juan Caballero
Uruguay	0:2	Colombia	Pedro Juan Caballero
7 March 1997
Brazil	1:1	Colombia	Pedro Juan Caballero
Uruguay	2:0	Bolivia	Pedro Juan Caballero
9 March 1997
Brazil	2:1	Uruguay	Pedro Juan Caballero
Chile	1:0	Colombia	Pedro Juan Caballero

== Final round ==
The final round were played in the same system that first round, with the best 4 teams.

Team	Pts	PJ	PG	PE	PP	GF	GC
Brazil	9	3	3	0	0	12	4
Argentina	4	3	1	1	1	4	2
Chile	3	3	1	0	2	5	9
Paraguay	1	3	0	1	2	1	7

11 March 1997
Argentina	3:0	Chile	Asunción
Brazil	5:0	Paraguay	Asunción
13 March 1997
Argentina	0:0	Paraguay	Asunción
Brazil	5:3	Chile	Asunción
16 March 1997
Argentina	1:2	Brazil	Asunción
Paraguay	1:2	Chile	Asunción

- Brazil, Argentina and Chile qualify to FIFA U-17 World Cup, Egypt '97

1997 South American Under-17 Football champions

Brazil
4th title

== Top goalscorers ==
Team	Players	Goals
(Brazil)	Geovanni	4
(Chile)	Milovan Mirosevic	4
(Chile)	Juan Viveros	4

== Ideal Team of the Tournament ==
Team	Players	Position
(Argentina)	Franco Costanzo	GK
(Brazil)	Janiro	DF
(Paraguay)	Paulo da Silva	DF
(Argentina)	Gabriel Milito	DF
(Brazil)	Jorginho	DF
(Brazil)	Ferrugem	MD
(Brazil)	Tacio	MD
(Brazil)	Ronaldinho	MD
(Chile)	Milovan Mirosevic	MD
(Chile)	Juan Viveros	FW
(Argentina)	Luciano Galletti	FW
