= C.D. Universidad de Concepción =

Chilean football club

Universidad de Concepción
- Full name: Club Deportivo Universidad de Concepción
- Nicknames: El Campanil; Los del Foro; La U penquista UdeC; Auricielo
- Founded: 8 August 1994; 32 years ago
- Ground: Estadio Ester Roa, Concepción, Biobio Region
- Capacity: 30,448
- Chairman: Mariano Campos
- Manager: Ricardo Viveros
- League: Liga de Primera
- 2025: Primera B, 1st of 16 (promoted)
- Website: www.cdudec.cl
Home colours	Away colours

Club Deportivo Universidad de Concepción, also known as Universidad de Concepción, are a Chilean football club based in Concepción, that is a current member of the Primera B. The club's home stadium is the Estadio Ester Roa de Concepción, which has a 30,480-spectator capacity.

== History ==
A "Club Deportivo Universitario" amateur team played in the Regional Championship in the 1940s, 1950s and 1960s. They played with teams like Naval de Talcahuano, Lord Cochrane and Fernández Vial and became champions in 1962. The current Club Deportivo Universidad de Concepción was founded in 1994.

=== Tercera División: 1994–1997 ===
Shortly after foundation. Universidad de Concepción were invited to the amateur Tercera División. The team played its first match against Deportes Talcahuano at Estadio El Morro on 10 April 1994. The club's coach was former Universitario footballer Luis Vera Avendaño. With 22 points that season, the club finished fourth in the South-central Zone in Tercera División and was nearly promoted to the Primera B (Premier B).

In the next season, Universidad de Concepción failed to duplicate the results of the previous season, finishing seventh in the South Zone. However, the club won the relegation play-offs to maintain its spot in the division.

During the 1996 season, with former footballer Mario Osbén as the coach, the club was runner-up in the Tercera División, after finishing second behind Santiago Morning in the quadrangular play-offs. Universidad de Concepción had a record of sixteen victories and six defeats in 34 games.

In 1997, Universidad de Concepción won the Tercera División. The club was promoted to Premier B, the first professional tournament and the first title for the club following a 2–1 victory over Unión La Calera on 8 December 1997.

=== Professional era ===
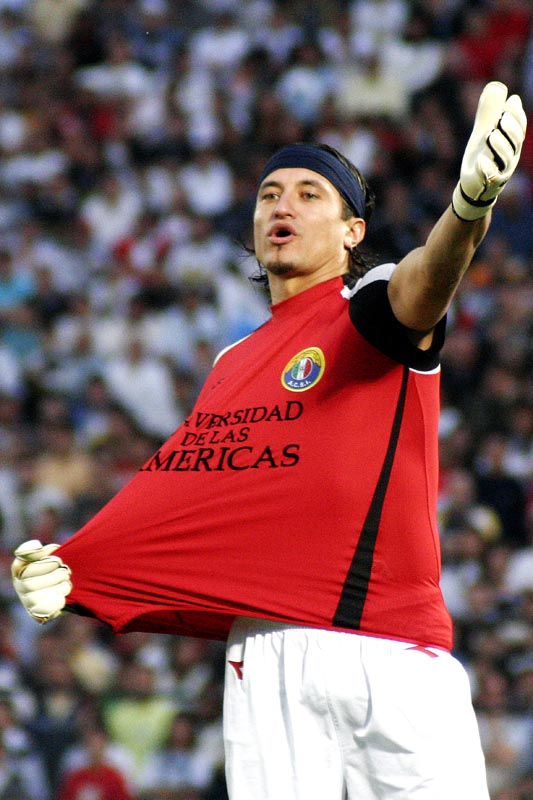
Nicolás Peric scored a goal for Universidad de Concepción in 2004.

In its first professional season, the club had success in the 1998 season and nearly qualified for the promotion play-offs to Primera División.

In 1999, the club finished ninth, prompting changes in club administration, including the hiring of a new coach, Luis Marcoleta. In 2002, the club was promoted to the top tier after finishing runner-up in the second division.

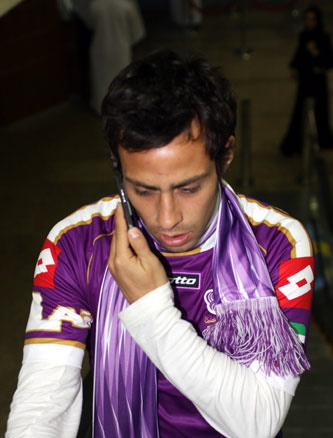
Jorge Valdivia, player of the club during 2003

In 2003, under coach Fernando Díaz, the club unexpectedly qualified for the Copa Libertadores and the Copa Sudamericana in 2004, after finishing first in the aggregate table (apertura and Clausura combined).

In the Copa Libertadores, the club were placed in Group 3 with Cruzeiro, Santos Laguna and Caracas. However, the club finished last. In the Copa Sudamericana, the club qualified for the Chile/Bolivia preliminary after a victory over Santiago Wanderers. However, the team was eliminated after being defeated 4–2 by Bolívar in La Paz. The club's second goal in this game was scored by goalkeeper Nicolás Peric. The club was recognized as the best club in Chilean football by the IFFHS in 2004.

During the Torneo de Apertura 2006, Universidad de Concepción advanced to the semi-finals against Colo-Colo, but the team was defeated 4–3 in the first leg and 2–0 in the second leg. However, they earned the fifth position in the Annual Table of 2006. In the next season, under coach Marcelo Barticciotto, the team was runner-up in the Torneo de Clausura 2007, having been defeated again by Colo-Colo.

In the 2008 season, Barticciotto was dismissed and replaced by Jorge Pellicer. In the Torneo de Apertura, the club finished in 16th place with 21 points. In the second semester tournament, the Torneo de Clausura, the club again ended in 16th position, forcing the club into relegation playoffs against Coquimbo Unido. However, Concepcion won 5–1 on aggregate to maintain its permanence in the top tier of Chilean football.

In the 2008-09 Copa Chile, the club was proclaimed champion of the tournament after a 2–1 victory over Deportes Ovalle at Francisco Sánchez Rumoroso Stadium.

After a difficult showing at the Torneo de Apertura 2009, the club earned fifth place at the Torneo de Clausura. The club was eliminated once again by Colo-Colo.

In the 2010 season, Concepción ended in 15th place out of 18 teams, with 38 points, and were sent to relegation play-offs again, defeating Curicó Unido. Things did not improve at all in the 2011 season, with the team finishing 13th in the aggregate table but only avoiding a spot in the relegation playoffs due to better goal difference.

The club was finally relegated in the 2012 season. After a 10th place finish in the Apertura and a 16th placed finish in the Clausura, the club was sent to a relegation playoff against Everton, losing 4-1 on aggregate.

The club made several changes to get the team back in the top tier and it paid off; the club achieved immediate promotion and was champion of the 2013 Primera B.

== Honours ==
- Primera B (II): 2

2013, 2025

- Copa Chile: 2

2008–09, 2014–15

== South American cups history ==
Season	Competition	Round	Country	Club	Home	Away	Aggregate
2004	Copa Libertadores	Group 3	(Mexico)	Santos Laguna	2–2	2–2	4th Place
2004	Copa Libertadores	Group 3	(Brazil)	Cruzeiro	1–3	0–5	4th Place
2004	Copa Libertadores	Group 3	(Venezuela)	Caracas	2–3	0–1	4th Place
2004	Copa Sudamericana	First Round	(Chile)	Santiago Wanderers	2–1	1–0	3–1
2004	Copa Sudamericana	Second Round	(Bolivia)	Bolívar	0–0	2–4	2–4
2015	Copa Sudamericana	First Round	(Paraguay)	Nacional	1–3	1–2	2–5
2016	Copa Sudamericana	First Round	(Bolivia)	Bolívar	2–0	0–3	2–3
2018	Copa Libertadores	Prel. Second stage	(Brazil)	Vasco da Gama	0–4	0–2	0–6
2019	Copa Libertadores	Group C	(Argentina)	Godoy Cruz	0–0	0–1	4th Place
2019	Copa Libertadores	Group C	(Paraguay)	Olimpia	3–3	1–1	4th Place
2019	Copa Libertadores	Group C	(Peru)	Sporting Cristal	5–4	0–2	4th Place

== Stats ==
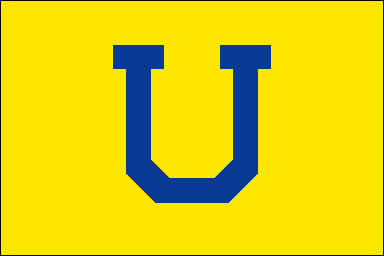

- Seasons in Campeonato Nacional: 17 (2003–12, 2013/14-)
- Seasons in Primera B (II): 6 (1998–02, 2013)
- Seasons in Tercera División (III): 4 (1994–97)
- Best finish in Campeonato Nacional: Runner-up (2007 C, 2018)
- Copa Libertadores appearances: 2 (2004, 2018)
- Copa Sudamericana appearances: 3 (2004, 2015, 2016)
- Largest Primera División victory: 8–2 (v Palestino in 2003 A)
- Largest Primera División defeat: 0–5 (v Deportes Antofagasta in 2017 C)
- Largest Copa Chile victory: 5–2 (v Huachipato in 2011)

== Players ==
=== Current squad ===
Current squad of C.D. Universidad de Concepción as of 13 August 2026 (edit)
Sources: ANFP Official Web Site

No.		Position	Player
1	ARG	GK	Jorge Broun
2	CHI	DF	Esteban Páez
3	ARG	DF	Miguel Barbieri
4	CHI	DF	Osvaldo González (c)
5	CHI	DF	David Retamal (loan from Universidad de Chile)
6	CHI	DF	Bastián Ubal
7	CHI	FW	Iam González (loan from Deportes Iquique)
8	SYR	MF	Facundo Mater (loan from Barracas Central)
9	ARG	FW	Daniel Barrea (loan from Godoy Cruz)
10	CHI	MF	Jeison Fuentealba (loan from Universidad de Chile)
11	CHI	DF	Antonio Díaz (loan from Universidad de Chile)
12	CHI	GK	Diego Matamala
13	CHI	GK	José Sanhueza
14	CHI	MF	Pablo Parra
15	CHI	DF	Yerco Oyanedel
16	CHI	MF	Bryan Ogaz
17	CHI	DF	Moisés González
18	PAN	FW	Cecilio Waterman
19	CHI	MF	Cristhofer Mesías
20	CHI	MF	Luis Rojas

No.		Position	Player
21	CHI	DF	Jorge Espejo
22	MEX	FW	Rogelio Funes Mori
23	CHI	DF	Patricio Romero (loan from Cobreloa)
25	CHI	MF	Harol Salgado
26	CHI	MF	Tomás Roco
27	CHI	FW	Cristóbal Zambrano
30	CHI	MF	Andrés Ther
31	CHI	FW	Jesús Mora
32	CHI	DF	Benjamín Sáez
33	CHI	FW	Renato Medina
34	CHI	MF	Francisco Herrera
35	CHI	FW	Martín Ramírez
36	CHI	FW	Martín Suazo
37	CHI	DF	Matías Ruiz
38	CHI	MF	Adolfo Neira
39	CHI	MF	Fernando Astudillo
40	CHI	DF	Giovanni Fernández
41	CHI	MF	Rafael Villegas
42	CHI	MF	Lucas Muñoz
43	CHI	DF	Jaime Poblete

Manager: Cristián Muñoz

=== 2026 winter transfers ===
==== In ====
Note: Flags indicate national team as defined under FIFA eligibility rules; some limited exceptions apply. Players may hold more than one non-FIFA nationality.

No.	Pos.	Nation	Player
1	GK	ARG	Jorge Broun (from Rosario Central)
3	DF	ARG	Miguel Barbieri (from Deportivo Riestra)
7	FW	CHI	Iam González (loan from Deportes Iquique)

No.	Pos.	Nation	Player
—	MF	CHI	Tomás Roco (loan from Fortaleza)
—	FW	MEX	Rogelio Funes Mori (from León)

==== Out ====
Note: Flags indicate national team as defined under FIFA eligibility rules; some limited exceptions apply. Players may hold more than one non-FIFA nationality.

No.	Pos.	Nation	Player
1	GK	URU	Santiago Silva (back to Boston River)
3	DF	ARG	Leonel González (back to Melgar)
7	FW	ARG	Agustín Urzi (loan to Levadiakos)

No.	Pos.	Nation	Player
20	FW	CHI	Ariel Uribe (back to Unión Española)
28	FW	PAR	Luca Kmet (back to Lanús)
—	DF	ARG	Walter Molas (back to Boca Juniors)

== Coaches ==
Interim coaches appear in italics.

- (Chile) Luis Vera (1994)
- (Chile) Óscar Zambrano (1995)
- (Chile) Mario Osbén (1996–1999)
- (Chile) Luis Marcoleta (2000)
- (Chile) Yuri Fernández (2001–2002)
- (Chile) Fernando Díaz (2003)
- (Chile) Óscar Meneses (2004)
- (Chile) Edgardo Avilés (2005)
- (Paraguay) Gualberto Jara (2005–2006)
- (Chile) Yuri Fernández (2006–2007)
- (Argentina) (Chile) Marcelo Barticciotto (2007–2008)
- (Chile) Yuri Fernández (2008)
- (Chile) Jorge Pellicer (2008–2010)
- (Chile) Yuri Fernández (2010)
- (Chile) Jaime Vera (2011)
- (Chile) Mauricio Riffo (2011)
- (Chile) Víctor Hugo Castañeda (2011–2012)
- (Chile) Yuri Fernández (2012)
- (Chile) Fernando Díaz (2012)
- (Argentina) Pablo Sánchez (2013–2014)
- (Chile) Ronald Fuentes (2015–2016)
- (Chile) Francisco Bozán (2016–2019)
- (Uruguay) Eduardo Acevedo (2020)
- (Chile) Hugo Balladares (2020–2021)
- (Chile) Fernando Vergara (2021–2022)
- (Chile) Bastián Straussmann (2022)
- (Chile) Miguel Ramírez (2022–2023)
- (Argentina) Darío Lema (2024)
- (Argentina) Javier Torrente (2024)
- (Chile) Cristián Muñoz (2025)
- (Argentina) Juan Cruz Real (2026)
- (Argentina) Facundo Gareca (2026–Present)

== See also ==
- Universidad de Concepción
- Universidad de Concepción (basketball team)
