= Kritsana Wongbudee =

Thai footballer (born 1980)

Personal information
- Full name: Kritsana Wongbudee
- Date of birth: July 20, 1980 (age 46)
- Place of birth: Bangkok, Thailand
- Height: 1.70 m (5 ft 7 in)
- Position: Midfielder

Senior career*
Years	Team	Apps	(Gls)
2001	Sembawang Rangers	16	(2)
2002	Tobacco Monopoly	?	(?)
2004–2009	PEA	?	(?)
2010–2011	Buriram PEA	0	(0)
2010	→ Buriram (loan)	6	(0)

International career
1996–1997	Thailand U17		
- * Club domestic league appearances and goals as of 11 October 2008

Kritsana Wongbudee is a Thai retired footballer. He won the Thailand Premier League in 2008.
