= Aziz Ansah =

Ghanaian footballer (born 1980)

Personal information
- Date of birth: 7 October 1980 (age 46)
- Place of birth: Ghana
- Height: 1.75 m (5 ft 9 in)
- Position: Defender

Youth career
- 1997: Cowlane Babies Colts

Senior career*
Years	Team	Apps	(Gls)
1998–2000	Accra Great Olympics		
1998–1999	R.F.C. Harelbeke	2	(1)
1999–2000	Napoli		
2000–2001	FC Brussels		
2001–2003	Asante Kotoko		
2004	Ashdod	11	(0)
2005	Nadi Club Bahrain		
2006–2007	Asante Kotoko		
2007	Accra Great Olympics		
2008–2009	Heartland F.C.		
2010	FC Dallas		
2010	Heartland F.C.		
2010–2011	Asante Kotoko		

International career
2002–2009	Ghana	9	(0)
- * Club domestic league appearances and goals

Aziz Ansah (born 7 October 1980) is a Ghanaian former professional footballer who played as defender.

== Club career ==
Ansah was born in Ghana. He moved to F.C. Dallas during the 2010 transfer window from the Nigerian CAF Champions League runners up Heartland F.C. He was released from the F.C. Dallas less than two months later in February 2010, having only played preseason matches.

== International career ==
Ansah first played international football for Ghana as a midfielder at the 1997 FIFA U-17 World Championship in Egypt, where Ghana were the losing finalist to Brazil. He later went on to receive nine full international caps and was part of Ghana's squad at the 2006 Africa Cup of Nations in Egypt, but subsequently missed out on a place in the squad for the 2006 FIFA World Cup.
