= Victor Muller (footballer) =

Argentinean footballer

Victor "Carucha" Muller
Personal information
- Full name: Victor Javier Muller
- Date of birth: 2 January 1973 (age 53)
- Place of birth: Argentina
- Position: Striker

Senior career*
Years	Team	Apps	(Gls)
-1995	Club Atlético Patronato		
1995-1997	Club Atlético Colón		
1997-1998	Newell's Old Boys	23	(6)
1998-1999	Club Atlético Colón		
1999	Chacarita Juniors		
2000	C.F. Monterrey		
2000-2001	Club Atlético Vélez Sarsfield	27	(6)
2002	Club Universidad Nacional		
2002	Club de Gimnasia y Esgrima La Plata	10	(1)
2003	C.F. Pachuca		
2003-2004	Chacarita Juniors		
2004-2006	C.S.D. Municipal		
2007-2010	Club Atlético Patronato	74	(13)
- * Club domestic league appearances and goals

Victor Muller (born 2 January 1973 in Argentina) is an Argentinean retired footballer.
