= Kay Langkawong =

Thai footballer (born 1980)

Personal information
- Full name: Kay Langkawong
- Date of birth: 21 December 1980 (age 45)
- Place of birth: Trat, Thailand
- Height: 1.72 m (5 ft 7 1/2 in)
- Position: Defender

Senior career*
Years	Team	Apps	(Gls)
1997–2001	Thai Farmers Bank		
2002–2003	Thailand Tobacco Monopoly		
2004–2005	TOT		
2006–2013	Singhtarua		

International career
1996–1997	Thailand U17		
- * Club domestic league appearances and goals

Kay Langkawong (Thai: เคย์ ลังกาวงษ์; born December 21, 1980) is a Thai former professional footballer.

== Honours ==
Queen's Cup Winner

1997 - Thai Farmers Bank

Kor Royal Cup Winner

2000 - Thai Farmers Bank

Thai FA Cup Winner

2009 - Thai Port
