= Marcone (footballer, born 1978) =

Qatari footballer

Personal information
- Full name: Marcone Amaral Costa Júnior
- Date of birth: 5 April 1978 (age 48)
- Place of birth: Poções, Brazil
- Height: 1.85 m (6 ft 1 in)
- Position: Centre-back

Youth career
- 1994–1996: Vitória

Senior career*
Years	Team	Apps	(Gls)
1997–1998	Vitória	10	(0)
1998–1999	Venezia	0	(0)
1998–1999	→ Bellinzona (loan)		
1999	Vitória	0	(0)
1999–2000	?		
2000–2001	Vitória	8	(0)
2001	Vila Nova		
2002	Vitória	0	(0)
2003	Estrela do Norte	0	(0)
2004	União Barbarense	0	(0)
2004	Marília	4	(0)
2004–2008	Al-Shamal	86	(1)
2008–2011	Al-Gharafa	24	(3)
2011–2013	El Jaish	10	(1)
2012	→ Al Rayyan (loan)	0	(0)
2013–2014	Al-Arabi SC	0	(0)
2014–2015	Al-Shamal		

International career
2010	Qatar Olympic	4	(0)
2008–2013	Qatar	38	(1)
- * Club domestic league appearances and goals

Marcone Amaral Costa Jr. (born 5 April 1978), known as Marcone, is a former footballer. Born in Brazil, he represented Qatar at international level.

== Biography ==
=== Brazil ===
Born in Poções, Bahia, Marcone started his career in Salvador. He made his Série A debut in the 1997 season, and played 10 games. After played for the team at 1998 Copa do Brasil and 1998 Campeonato Baiano, he was signed by Italian club A.C. Venezia along with Bilica and Tácio, however at that time Italian Football Federation imposed a quota on how many non-EU player that a team to keep and field them, thus Marcone was loaned to Swiss side Bellinzona.

He then returned to Vitória and played in 1999 Copa do Brasil and 1999 Campeonato Baiano. He left the club before the start of 1999 Campeonato Brasileiro Série A. He returned to the team for Copa João Havelange. After played for the team at 2001 Copa do Brasil and 2001 Campeonato Baiano, he was transferred to Vila Nova of 2001 Campeonato Brasileiro Série B.

In 2003, he left for Estrela do Norte. After played for União Barbarense at 2004 Copa do Brasil and 2004 Campeonato Paulista, he left for Marília. He played 4 games in 2004 Campeonato Brasileiro Série B, all as substitutes.

=== Qatar ===
In July 2004 he left for Qatari side Al-Shamal. He then left for Al-Gharafa. He only played twice in 2010 AFC Champions League, on group stage match 6 and the succeeding round of 16 match.

In July 2011, it was announced on the QFA website that Marcone had left Al-Gharafa to join the recently promoted El Jaish.

=== Club career statistics ===
Statistics accurate as of 21 August 2011

Club	Season	League	League		Cup^{1}		League Cup^{2}		Continental^{3}		Total	
Club	Season	League	Apps	Goals	Apps	Goals	Apps	Goals	Apps	Goals	Apps	Goals
Al-Shamal	2004–05	QSL	24	0								
Al-Shamal	2005–06	QSL	13	1								
Al-Shamal	2006–07	QSL	26	0								
Al-Shamal	2007–08	QSL	23	0								
Al-Shamal	Total		86	1								
Al-Gharafa	2008–09	QSL	14	1								
Al-Gharafa	2009–10	QSL	0	0								
Al-Gharafa	2010–11	QSL	10	2								
Al-Gharafa	Total		24	3								
Al-Jaish	2011–12	QSL										
Al-Jaish	Total											
Career total			110	4								

^{1}Includes Emir of Qatar Cup.

^{2}Includes Sheikh Jassem Cup.

^{3}Includes AFC Champions League.

=== International career ===
Marcone played for Qatar after lived for the county for more than 2 years (FIFA requirement). He played 9 games in 2010 FIFA World Cup qualification.

He was the captain of Qatar team at 2010 Asian Games as one of the three overage players.

=== International goals ===
Scores and results list Qatar's goal tally first.

#	Date	Venue	Opponent	Score	Result	Competition
1	25 August 2011	Al Ain City, United Arab Emirates	United Arab Emirates	3–1	Lost	Friendly

== Honours ==
Regional

- Campeonato do Nordeste: 1997, 1999

State

- Copa Espírito Santo: 2003
- Campeonato Baiano: 1997, 2000
