= Sergio Santamaría =

Spanish footballer (born 1980)

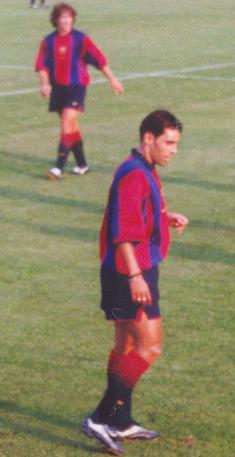
- Santamaría in 2000

Personal information
- Full name: Sergio Santamaría González
- Date of birth: 16 July 1980 (age 46)
- Place of birth: Málaga, Spain
- Height: 1.78 m (5 ft 10 in)
- Position: Attacking midfielder

Youth career
- 1991–1992: La Cala Moral
- 1992–1996: Málaga
- 1996–1998: Barcelona

Senior career*
Years	Team	Apps	(Gls)
1998–2000	Barcelona C	59	(13)
1998–2004	Barcelona B	67	(8)
2000–2005	Barcelona	6	(0)
2001–2002	→ Oviedo (loan)	32	(2)
2002–2003	→ Elche (loan)	15	(1)
2004–2005	→ Alavés (loan)	25	(0)
2005–2006	Albacete	31	(0)
2006–2007	Sant Andreu	25	(3)
2007–2008	Logroñés	28	(3)
2008–2009	Alzira	19	(0)
2009–2010	Antequera	18	(1)
2010–2011	Alhaurín Torre	0	(0)
Total		325	(31)

International career
1997–1998	Spain U17	9	(2)
1998–1999	Spain U18	8	(1)
2000	Spain U21	1	(0)
- * Club domestic league appearances and goals

Sergio Santamaría González (born 16 July 1980) is a Spanish former professional footballer who played as an attacking midfielder.

== Club career ==
Santamaría was born in Málaga, Andalusia. At age 12, after scoring 52 goals for local La Cala del Moral, he moved to neighbours Málaga CF to continue his grooming, and joined country giants FC Barcelona after four years.

In 1998–99, the Catalan's director of football, Lorenzo Serra Ferrer, promoted Santamaría to the club's B-team, which also included Luis García, Carles Puyol and Xavi. In the following seasons, he switched back and forth between the B and the C-sides, as both squads operated in 4–3–3, and the player scored 11 goals; on 19 May 2000, he made his first-team – and La Liga – debut, playing 45 minutes against Celta de Vigo in the last matchday.

After the following campaign, in which he played exclusively for the reserves, Santamaría begun a series of loans until his June 2005 final release, all in the second division. In between, he also appeared four times for Barça in the season in which he was not loaned.

In the summer of 2005, Santamaría moved to Albacete Balompié also in the second level. Subsequently, he dropped down to division three, with UE Sant Andreu and CD Logroñés; he had a solid individual season with the latter club, but it was nonetheless relegated due to economic issues.

Santamaría resumed his career in the fourth tier, respectively with UD Alzira, Antequera CF and Alhaurín de la Torre CF (the latter two in his native region). He retired in June 2011 at the age of 31, due to injury.

== International career ==
As he was part of Barcelona B's setup, Santamaría was called to represent Spain at the 1997 FIFA U-17 World Championship in Egypt. He was the recipient of the tournament's Golden Ball over the likes of Ronaldinho, Gabriel Milito and Sebastian Deisler, in an eventual third-place finish.
