= Autódromo Las Vizcachas =

Motorsport racing facility in Puente Alto, Chile

- Standard Circuit (1965–present)
- Location: Puente Alto, Chile
- Coordinates: 33°36′4″S 70°31′22″W
- Opened: 5 October 1965; 61 years ago Re-opened: 2012
- Closed: 2006
- Major events: F3 Sudamericana (1989)

Extended Circuit (1992–present)
- Length: 2.200 km (1.367 mi)
- Turns: 7

Standard Circuit (1965–present)
- Length: 1.600 km (0.994 mi)
- Turns: 4

Long Circuit (1965–1991)
- Length: 3.000 km (1.864 mi)
- Turns: 8

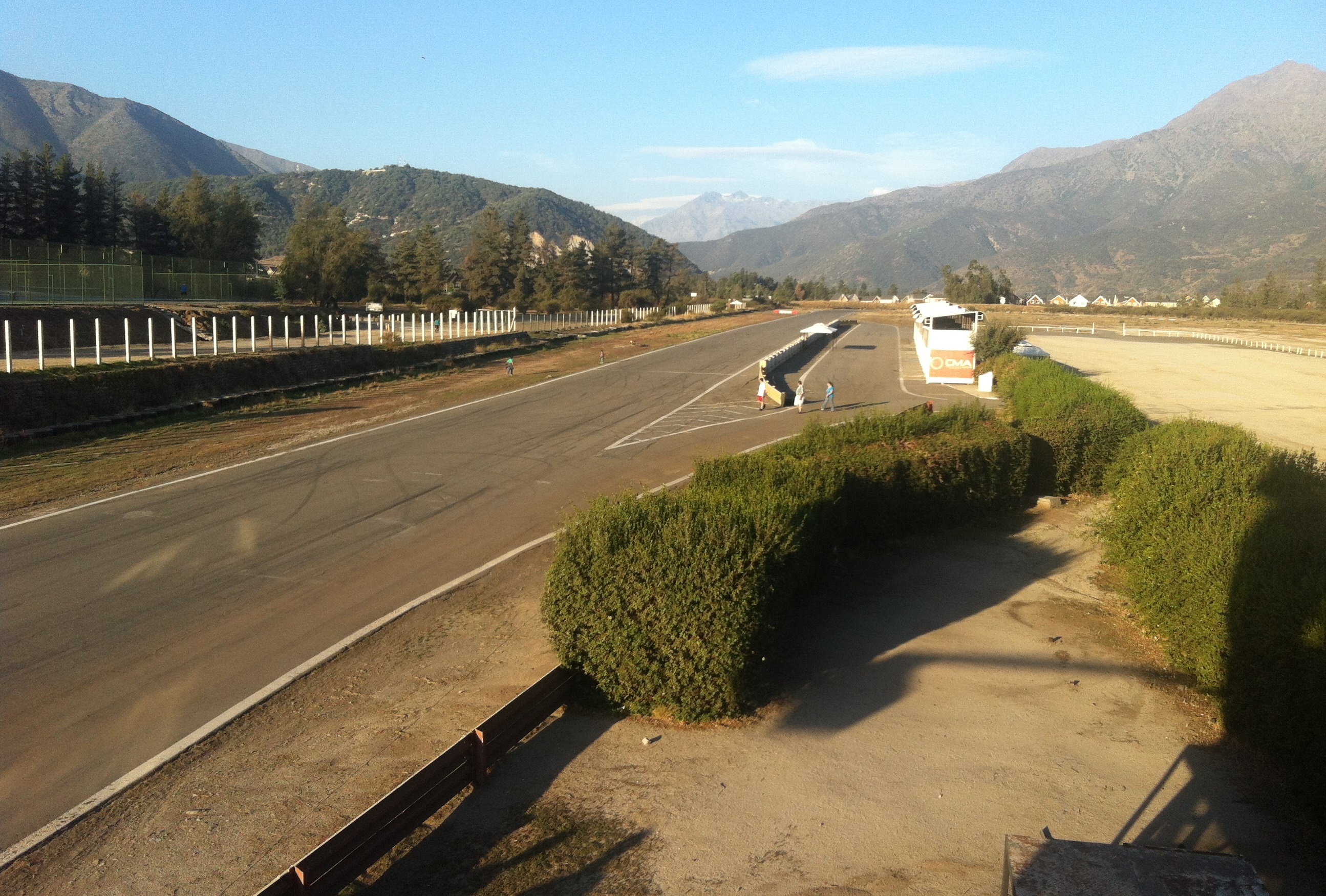
Autódromo Las Vizcachas

The Autódromo Las Vizcachas is a motorsport racing circuit located in Puente Alto, in the Santiago Metropolitan Region of Chile. It was opened on October 5, 1965, and was in operation for 41 years. In 2006, it was closed to give way to a real estate project close to the circuit, which implied the prohibition of the development of motor tests in the layout, but in 2012 races were held again.
