= Mamadou Coulibaly (footballer, born 1980) =

Ivorian footballer

Personal information
- Date of birth: 26 May 1980 (age 46)
- Place of birth: Bouaké, Ivory Coast
- Height: 1.73 m (5 ft 8 in)
- Position: Left-back

Senior career*
Years	Team	Apps	(Gls)
1998–1999	Bouaké		
1999–2000	Satellite Abidjan		
2000–2005	Lokeren	96	(0)
2005–2006	Nordsjælland	4	(0)
2006–2007	Ethnikos Asteras	17	(0)
2007–2012	Bleid	109	(0)
2012–2013	Habay-la-Vieille		
2013–2016	Rodange	59	(0)
2016–2017	Racing Union		
2017–2018	Rossignol		

International career^{‡}
2000–2003	Ivory Coast	20	(0)
- * Club domestic league appearances and goals as of 00:11, 26 March 2021 (UTC) ‡ National team caps and goals as of 00:11, 26 March 2021 (UTC)

Mamadou Coulibaly (born 26 May 1980) is an Ivorian retired footballer who played as a left-back for the Ivory Coast national team. Coulibaly played for professional clubs in the Ivory Coast, Belgium, Denmark, Greece, and Luxembourg.

== International career ==
Coulibaly first represented the Ivory Coast national team in a 2–2 2002 FIFA World Cup qualification tie with Rwanda on 9 April 2000.
