= Aboubacar Guindo =

Malian footballer

Personal information
- Date of birth: 30 May 1981 (age 45)
- Place of birth: Bamako, Mali
- Height: 1.68 m (5 ft 6 in)
- Position: Striker

Senior career*
Years	Team	Apps	(Gls)
2000–2004	ASOA Valence	43	(2)
2004–2005	Aurillac FCA		
2005–2006	Paris FC		
2006–2007	FC Mantes		
2007–2009	Pacy Vallée-d'Eure		
2009–2010	ES Viry-Châtillon	28	(2)
2010–2011	Pacy Vallée-d'Eure		
2012–2012	JA Drancy		
- * Club domestic league appearances and goals

Aboubacar Guindo (born 30 May 1981, in Bamako) is a Malian former professional footballer who played as a striker.

He played on the professional level in Ligue 2 for ASOA Valence.

Guindo played for Mali at the 1997 FIFA U-17 World Championship in Egypt.
