= Yuri Fernández =

Chilean football manager (born 1957)

Personal information
- Full name: Matt Yuri Fernández López
- Date of birth: 10 August 1957 (age 69)
- Place of birth: Chillán, Chile
- Height: 1.73 m (5 ft 8 in)

Team information
- Current team: República Independiente (manager)

Youth career
- Huachipato

Senior career*
Years	Team	Apps	(Gls)
1979–1982	Huachipato		

Managerial career
- 1998–2000: Huachipato (youth)
- 2001: Huachipato
- 2001–2002: Universidad de Concepción
- 2003–2004: Santiago Wanderers
- 2005: Rangers
- 2006–2007: Universidad de Concepción
- 2007: Santiago Wanderers
- 2008: Universidad de Concepción (youth)
- 2008: Universidad de Concepción (caretaker)
- 2010: Universidad de Concepción
- 2012: Universidad de Concepción
- 2022: Independiente Cauquenes
- 2023–2025: Deportes Quillón
- 2026–: República Independiente
- * Club domestic league appearances and goals

Matt Yuri Fernández López (born 10 August 1957) is a Chilean football manager. He is currently in charge of República Independiente de Hualqui in the Tercera B.

== Career ==
He has been five-times coach of Universidad de Concepción. He is married and has four children.

In 2022, Fernández led Independiente de Cauquenes. The next three seasons, he coached Deportes Quillón and switched to República Independiente de Hualqui for the 2026 season.
