= Bamrung Boonprom =

Thai footballer (born 1977)

Personal information
- Full name: Bamrung Boonprom
- Date of birth: 22 April 1977 (age 49)
- Place of birth: Suphan Buri, Thailand
- Height: 1.65 m (5 ft 5 in)
- Position: Striker

Team information
- Current team: Suphanburi (head coach)

Youth career
- 1992–1994: Suankularb Wittayalai School

Senior career*
| Years | Team | Apps | (Gls) |
| 1995–1998 | Suphanburi | 46 | (33) |
| 1998–2003 | Bangkok Bank | 64 | (27) |
| 2009–2011 | Lopburi | 5 | (2) |
| Total | | 115 | (62) |

International career^{‡}
| 1995–1998 | Thailand U17 | 22 | (15) |

Managerial career
- 2018–2019: Thailand U19 (assistant)
- 2019: Trang
- 2019: Thailand U19 (assistant)
- 2019: Thailand U19 (interim)
- 2022–2024: Thailand U23 (assistant)
- 2025–: Suphanburi
- * Club domestic league appearances and goals as of 18:42, 15 May 2008 (UTC) ‡ National team caps and goals as of 12:00, 23 June 2008 (UTC)

Bamrung Boonprom (Thai: บำรุง บุญพรหม, born 22 April 1977) is a Thai professional football manager and retired footballer who is head coach of Thai League 3 club Suphanburi.

He was awarded the Asian Young Footballer of the Year by the Asian Football Confederation (AFC) in 1996. He played at 1997 FIFA U-17 World Championship in Egypt.

== Honours ==
=== Individual ===
- Asian Young Footballer of the Year : 1996
