= Jorge Espejo (Chilean footballer) =

Chilean footballer

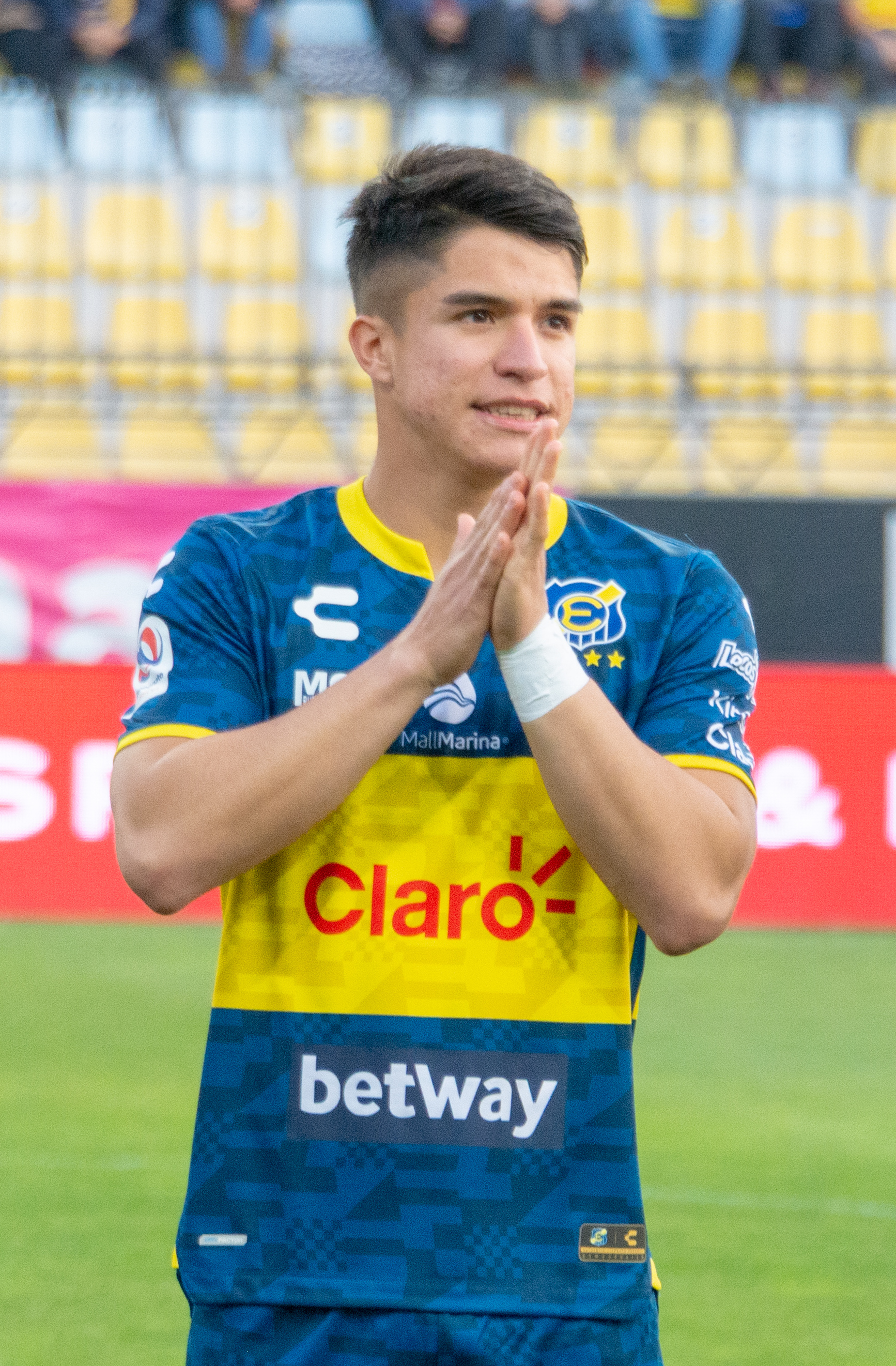
- Jorge Espejo playing for Everton against Unión La Calera at Estadio Sausalito in Viña del Mar, Chile, on July 16, 2023

Personal information
- Full name: Jorge Andrés Espejo Leppe
- Date of birth: 28 July 2000 (age 26)
- Place of birth: Pudahuel, Santiago, Chile
- Height: 1.72 m (5 ft 8 in)
- Position: Full-back

Team information
- Current team: Universidad de Concepción

Youth career
- Guacolda
- 2010–2020: Cobreloa

Senior career*
Years	Team	Apps	(Gls)
2019–2025	Cobreloa	83	(3)
2023	→ Everton (loan)	25	(1)
2025	→ Audax Italiano (loan)	28	(1)
2026–	Universidad de Concepción	0	(0)
- * Club domestic league appearances and goals as of 19 December 2025

Jorge Andrés Espejo Leppe (born 28 July 2000) is a Chilean footballer who plays as a full-back for Universidad de Concepción. Mainly a right-back, he can operate on both sides of the field.

== Club career ==
Born in Pudahuel, Santiago de Chile, Espejo was with local club Guacolda before joining the Cobreloa youth ranks in Santiago at the age of 10. He moved to Calama at the age of 16 and made his professional debut in the 1–0 loss away against Deportes Santa Cruz on 2 June 2019 for the Primera B de Chile. Later, he signed his first professional contract in July 2021.

In January 2023, Espejo was loaned out to Everton de Viña del Mar in the Chilean Primera División. Once Cobreloa returned to the Chilean top division, he played for them during the 2024 season. The next season, he was loaned out again to Audax Italiano.

Espejo signed with Universidad de Concepción from Cobreloa.
