= Abdullah Quaye =

Ghanaian footballer (born 1980)

Personal information
- Full name: Awule Quaye Junior
- Date of birth: 24 September 1980 (age 46)
- Place of birth: Accra, Ghana
- Height: 1.83 m (6 ft 0 in)
- Position: Midfielder

Senior career*
Years	Team	Apps	(Gls)
1997–1999	Ourense	5	(0)
1999–2001	Málaga	1	(0)
2001–2002	Accra Hearts		
2002–2003	Al-Ittifaq		
2003–2005	CS Sfaxien		
2005–2007	Zamalek		
2007–2008	Al-Wahda		
2009–2010	Al Ittihad Alexandria		
- * Club domestic league appearances and goals

Abdullah Quaye (born 24 September 1980), formerly Awulley Junior Quaye, is a Ghanaian former professional footballer who played as a midfielder.

== Club career ==
Quaye was born in Accra. He had a spell with Málaga CF in Spain's La Liga.

== International career ==
Quaye was a member of the Ghana national team and participated in the 1997 FIFA U-17 World Championship in Egypt.

== Personal life ==
Quaye converted to Islam shortly after his joining of Meccan side Al-Wahda and changed his name to Abdullah. He is the brother of Lawrence Quaye, a Ghana-born naturalised Qatari footballer, and the son of Olympics & Ghanaian international defender Awuley Quaye Sr.
