= Edwin Santibáñez =

Mexican footballer (born 1980)

Personal information
- Full name: Edwin Santibáñez Noé
- Date of birth: 1 February 1980 (age 46)
- Place of birth: Torreón, Coahuila, Mexico
- Height: 1.70 m (5 ft 7 in)
- Position: Midfielder

Team information
- Current team: León (women) (Assistant)

Senior career*
Years	Team	Apps	(Gls)
2002–2004	San Luis F.C.	70	(7)
2004–2005	C.F. Pachuca	12	(1)
2005–2010	C.F. Ciudad Juárez	150	(7)
2010–2013	Club León	32	(2)

Managerial career
- 2013–2014: León (Goalkeeper coach)
- 2015: América (Goalkeeper coach)
- 2015: Atlas (Assistant)
- 2023–: León (women) (Assistant)
- * Club domestic league appearances and goals as of 10 November 2012

Edwin Santibáñez (born 1 February 1980) is a Mexican retired footballer. He played for Club León of the Liga de Ascenso. In the Mexican draft of July 5, he decided to end his career as a player.

Santibáñez played for Mexico at the 1997 FIFA U-17 World Championship in Egypt.
