= Santiago Silva (footballer, born 1999) =

Uruguayan footballer (born 1999)

Personal information
- Full name: Santiago Ibraim Silva Azambuja
- Date of birth: 11 May 1999 (age 27)
- Place of birth: Salto, Uruguay
- Height: 1.86 m (6 ft 1 in)
- Position: Goalkeeper

Team information
- Current team: Boston River

Youth career
- 2007–2015: Universitario de Salto
- 2015–2019: Defensor Sporting

Senior career*
Years	Team	Apps	(Gls)
2019	Defensor Sporting	0	(0)
2019–	Boston River	94	(0)
2025	→ América de Cali (loan)	8	(0)
2026	→ Universidad de Concepción (loan)	10	(0)
- * Club domestic league appearances and goals as of 22 July 2026

Santiago Ibraim Silva Azambuja (born 11 May 1999) is a Uruguayan professional footballer who plays as a goalkeeper for Boston River.

== Club career ==
Born in Salto, Uruguay, Silva was with the local club, Universitario de Salto from the age of 8 to 15 and represented the Salto city team at under-15 and under-18 level in 2015, winning the national championship in both categories. Following Universitario, he joined the Defensor Sporting youth ranks until he switched to Boston River in 2019. A member of the first team since the same year, he made his professional debut in the 0–0 draw against Plaza Colonia on 6 February 2022 for the Torneo Apertura and became the regular goalkeeper the next seasons.

In 2025, Silva was loaned out to Colombian club América de Cali. The next season, he was loaned out to Chilean Primera División club Universidad de Concepción.
