= Javier Almirón =

Argentine footballer (born 1980)

Personal information
- Full name: Javier Alejandro Almirón
- Date of birth: February 9, 1980 (age 46)
- Place of birth: Lanús, Argentina
- Height: 1.78 m (5 ft 10 in)
- Position: Defender

Senior career*
Years	Team	Apps	(Gls)
1999–2005	Lanús	50	(0)
2005–2006	Tenerife (loan)	34	(0)
2006–2007	Lanús	8	(0)
2007–2008	Poli Ejido (loan)	14	(0)
2008–2009	Deportivo Alavés (loan)	22	(1)
2009–2010	Girona (loan)	5	(0)
2011	FC Luch-Energiya Vladivostok	26	(1)

International career
	Argentina U-17	2	(0)
- * Club domestic league appearances and goals as of 13:59, 2 June 2012 (UTC)

Javier Alejandro Almirón (born February 9, 1980, in Lanús) is an Argentine professional football player who last played for FC Luch-Energiya Vladivostok.
