= Fábio Pinto =

Brazilian footballer (born 1980)

Personal information
- Full name: Fábio Nascimento Pinto
- Date of birth: October 9, 1980 (age 46)
- Place of birth: Itajaí, Santa Catarina, Brazil
- Height: 1.70 m (5 ft 7 in)
- Position: Forward

Youth career
- 1995–1997: Internacional

Senior career*
Years	Team	Apps	(Gls)
1998–2000	Oviedo	31	(5)
2001	Internacional	5	(1)
2002–2004	Galatasaray	20	(1)
2004	Grêmio	24	(5)
2005	São Caetano	13	(1)
2006	Coritiba	9	(2)
2006–2007	Cruzeiro	10	(2)
2007	→ Guarani (loan)	8	(1)
2007	→ Cabofriense (loan)	5	(0)
2008–2009	Pakhtakor	20	(11)

International career
1996–1997	Brazil U17	8	(5)
Medal record
Men's football
Representing Brazil
FIFA U-17 World Championship
Winner	1997 Egypt	U-17 team
- * Club domestic league appearances and goals

Fábio Nascimento Pinto (born 9 October 1980) is a Brazilian former footballer who played as a forward.

== Career statistics ==
Fábio Pinto played for several clubs in the Campeonato Brasileiro, including Sport Club Internacional, Grêmio Foot-Ball Porto Alegrense, Associação Desportiva São Caetano, Cruzeiro Esporte Clube and Guarani Futebol Clube. He also had a spell with Galatasaray S.K. in the Turkish Super Lig.

He played for Brazil at the 1997 FIFA U-17 World Championship in Egypt.

== Honours ==
=== Club ===
- Campeonato Gaúcho Juvenil: 1997
- Campeonato Gaúcho Júnior: 1997
- Copa São Paulo de Juniores: 1998
- Campeonato Gaúcho: 2002
- Campeonato Pernambucano: 2005

=== International ===
Brazil U-17

- FIFA U-17 World Championship: 1997

=== Individual ===
- Third-highest scorer at the 1997 FIFA U-17 World Championship
