= Juanjo Camacho =

Spanish footballer (born 1980)

Personal information
- Full name: Juan José Camacho Barnola
- Date of birth: 2 August 1980 (age 46)
- Place of birth: Valencia, Spain
- Height: 1.81 m (5 ft 11 in)
- Position: Attacking midfielder

Youth career
- Zaragoza

Senior career*
Years	Team	Apps	(Gls)
1998–2000	Zaragoza B	71	(7)
2000–2002	Zaragoza	0	(0)
2000–2001	→ Recreativo (loan)	31	(5)
2001–2002	→ Real Madrid B (loan)	34	(3)
2002–2004	Livingston	30	(4)
2004–2005	Zaragoza B	13	(6)
2005–2006	Zaragoza	5	(0)
2006	→ Lleida (loan)	15	(0)
2006–2007	Huesca	37	(10)
2007–2008	Vecindario	36	(7)
2008–2019	Huesca	356	(72)
Total		628	(114)

International career
1996–1997	Spain U16	11	(6)
1997–1998	Spain U17	9	(2)
1998–1999	Spain U18	9	(6)
Medal record
Men's football
Representing Spain
UEFA European Under-16 Championship
Winner	1997 Germany
- * Club domestic league appearances and goals

Juan José 'Juanjo' Camacho Barnola (born 2 August 1980) is a Spanish former professional footballer who played as an attacking midfielder.

He spent most of his 21-year senior career with Huesca, appearing in more than 400 official matches for the club and in several Segunda División seasons. He also spent some time in La Liga with Zaragoza, and had a two-year spell in the Scottish Premier League with Livingston.

== Club career ==
Born in Valencia, Valencian Community, Camacho started playing professionally with Real Zaragoza, but appeared almost exclusively for the B team in the Segunda División B, also playing one season in the Segunda División with Recreativo de Huelva, on loan. Released in summer 2001 he returned to the third division, representing Real Madrid Castilla.

From 2002 to 2004, Camacho played in Scotland for Livingston, teaming up with compatriot Guillermo Amor in his first season. He then returned to Zaragoza, but could only make five La Liga appearances, all in the closing stages of 2004–05, being again almost exclusively associated with the Aragonese club's reserves and also loaned to UE Lleida for five months.

Camacho represented two teams the next two campaigns, SD Huesca and UD Vecindario, both in division three. He returned to Huesca in 2008 with the team now in the second tier, and settled there as first choice the following years; in 2010–11 he scored a career-high 13 goals (squad best), also being their most utilised player overall (3,675 minutes).

On 26 November 2017, in a 2–0 away loss against Granada CF, Camacho appeared in his 400th competitive match for Huesca. He contributed 20 scoreless appearances during that season, as the club reached the top flight for the first time in history.

Camacho announced his retirement on 14 May 2019, at the age of 38.

== Personal life ==
Camacho's father Juan José was also a footballer, as younger brother Ignacio. The latter was also a midfielder brought up at Zaragoza but, as a professional, played mostly for Málaga CF.

== Honours ==
Spain U16

- UEFA European Under-16 Championship: 1997
