= Juan Bautista Esquivel =

Costa Rican footballer (born 1980)

Personal information
- Full name: Juan Bautista Esquivel Lobo
- Date of birth: 12 August 1980 (age 46)
- Place of birth: San Ramón, Costa Rica
- Height: 1.71 m (5 ft 7 in)
- Position: Winger

Senior career*
| Years | Team | Apps | (Gls) |
| 1998–2005 | Saprissa | | |

International career
| 2002–2003 | Costa Rica | 4 | (0) |
- * Club domestic league appearances and goals

Juan Bautista Esquivel Lobo (born 12 August 1980) is a retired Costa Rican professional footballer who played his entire career for Saprissa.

== Club career ==
Born in San Ramón, Esquivel made his professional debut for Saprissa against Limonense. With Saprissa, Esquivel won three national championships, as well as a UNCAF Cup title and a CONCACAF Champions Cup title.

He participated in the 2005 FIFA Club World Championship with his team, who ended up in third place, behind São Paulo and Liverpool After his sudden retirement, he was offered a coaching job at Saprissa´s minor league system.

=== Forced retirement ===
Better known as Juanbau, he used to play as a left winger, before a heart condition cut his promising career short in 2005. He was forced to leave professional football at the short age of 25, despite being considered as a future star for his team and the Costa Rica national football team. His father Santiago had died from the same heart disease.

In June 2009, Bautista Esquivel was named assistant to manager Luis Torres at second division side Barrio México.

== International career ==
Esquivel played at the 1997 FIFA U-17 World Championship held in Egypt, and the 1999 FIFA World Youth Championship held in Nigeria.

Esquivel then made four appearances for the senior Costa Rica national football team, his debut coming in a friendly against Morocco on March 27, 2002. His final international was a November 2003 friendly match against Finland.
