= Mohsin Al-Harbi =

Omani footballer (born 1980)

Personal information
- Full name: Mohsin Saleh Rashid Al-Harbi
- Date of birth: 22 September 1980 (age 46)
- Place of birth: Oman
- Position: Attacking midfielder

Team information
- Current team: Sur

Senior career*
| Years | Team | Apps | (Gls) |
| 1997–2008 | Sur | ? | |
| 2008–2011 | Al-Suwaiq | ? | |
| 2011–2017 | Sur | | |

International career
| 1997–2002 | Oman | 26 | (0) |
- * Club domestic league appearances and goals

Mohsin Saleh Rashid Al-Harbi (Arabic: محسن صالح راشد الحربي; born 22 September 1980), commonly known as Mohsin Al-Harbi, is an Omani footballer who played for Sur SC.

== Club career statistics ==
| Club | Season | Division | League | | Cup | | Continental | | Other | | Total | |
| Club | Season | Division | Apps | Goals | Apps | Goals | Apps | Goals | Apps | Goals | Apps | Goals |
|---|---|---|---|---|---|---|---|---|---|---|---|---|
| Al-Suwaiq | 2009–10 | Omani League | - | 3 | - | 2 | 0 | 0 | - | 0 | - | 5 |
| Al-Suwaiq | 2010–11 | Omani League | - | 5 | - | 0 | 6 | 0 | - | 0 | - | 5 |
| Al-Suwaiq | Total | | - | 8 | - | 2 | 6 | 0 | - | 0 | - | 10 |
| Career total | | | - | 8 | - | 2 | 6 | 0 | - | 0 | - | 10 |

== International career ==
Mohsin was part of the first team squad of the Oman national football team from 1997 to 2002. He was selected for the national team for the first time in 1997. He has made an appearance in the 2002 FIFA World Cup qualification.

== Honours ==
=== Club ===
- With Sur

- Omani League (0): Runners-up 1997–98, 2001–02
- Sultan Qaboos Cup (1): 2007; Runners-up 2006
- Omani Federation Cup (1): 2007
- Oman Super Cup (0): Runners-up 2008

- With Al-Suwaiq

- Oman Elite League (2): 2009–10, 2010–11
- Sultan Qaboos Cup (1): 2008
- Oman Super Cup (0): Runners-up 2009, 2010, 2011
