= Silvio Adzic =

German footballer

Personal information
- Date of birth: 23 September 1980 (age 46)
- Place of birth: Grünstadt, West Germany
- Height: 1.70 m (5 ft 7 in)
- Position: Midfielder

Youth career
- 1984–1986: TuS Altleiningen
- 1986–1990: VfR Grünstadt
- 1990–1991: Viktoria Lambsheim
- 1991–1999: Kaiserslautern

Senior career*
Years	Team	Apps	(Gls)
1998–2003	Kaiserslautern II	133	(51)
1999–2003	Kaiserslautern	12	(1)
2003–2004	VfB Lübeck	23	(6)
2004–2006	SpVgg Unterhaching	32	(3)
2006–2007	TuS Koblenz	4	(0)
2007–2008	FSV Oggersheim	22	(1)
2009	FC Eilenburg	9	(0)
2009–2015	TuS Altleiningen		
2015–2017	TuS Altleiningen		
- * Club domestic league appearances and goals

Silvio Adzic (born 23 September 1980 in Grünstadt) is a retired German football player. He made his debut on the professional league level in the Bundesliga for 1. FC Kaiserslautern on 30 September 2000 when he came on as a substitute in the 68th minute in a game against FC Energie Cottbus. He scored one goal in his first Bundesliga season, an equalizer in the 1–1 tie against Hamburger SV.

== Honours ==
Kaiserslautern

- DFB-Pokal finalist: 2002–03

Germany U16

- UEFA European Under-16 Championship third place: 1997
