= Juan Francisco Viveros =

Chilean footballer (born 1980)

Personal information
- Full name: Juan Francisco Viveros Opazo
- Date of birth: 11 August 1980 (age 46)
- Place of birth: Concepción, Chile
- Height: 1.85 m (6 ft 1 in)
- Position: Winger

Team information
- Current team: Deportes Concepción (director)

Senior career*
| Years | Team | Apps | (Gls) |
| 1997 | Huachipato | | |
| 1998–1999 | Lourinhanense | 25 | (10) |
| 1999–2001 | Sporting CP | 3 | (0) |
| 1999–2000 | → Lourinhanense (loan) | 21 | (3) |
| 2000–2001 | → Alverca (loan) | 5 | (0) |
| 2001–2002 | Huachipato | 42 | (4) |
| 2003 | União Leiria | 4 | (0) |
| 2005 | Santiago Wanderers | 26 | (6) |
| 2006 | Universidad de Concepción | 26 | (3) |
| 2007–2009 | Ñublense | 81 | (13) |
| 2010–2011 | Lota Schwager | 54 | (9) |
| 2011–2014 | Halcones | | |
| 2014–2015 | Al-Ittihad Club | | |
| 2014–2015 | → Comunicaciones (loan) | | |

International career
| 1997 | Chile U17 | 3 | (2) |

Managerial career
- Ñublense (youth)
- 2021–: Deportes Concepción (director)
- * Club domestic league appearances and goals

Juan Francisco Viveros Opazo (born 11 August 1980), nicknamed El Táctico (The Tactician), is a Chilean football manager and former player.

== Club career ==
As player of Sporting CP, Viveros ran into Cristiano Ronaldo, Quaresma and Kasper Schmeichel. His last club in Chile was the Primera B side Lota Schwager.

== International career ==
Viveros was part of the Chilean under-17 national side who participated in the 1997 FIFA U-17 World Championship. He scored two goals in the group stage against Thailand.

== Managerial career ==
Viveros graduated as a football manager at the Chilean Instituto Nacional del Fútbol (Football National Institute) and has worked as manager of the Ñublense Youth Team. Previously, he worked as Coordinator for the 2015 FIFA U-17 World Cup in Chillán. In the 2021 season, he joined Segunda División side Deportes Concepción as Director of Football.

== Personal life ==
He is the nephew of the former Chilean international footballer Gustavo Viveros and cousin of Ricardo Viveros.
