= David Sousa (footballer, born 1980) =

Spanish footballer

Personal information
- Full name: Francisco David Sousa Franquelo
- Date of birth: 3 February 1980 (age 46)
- Place of birth: Málaga, Spain
- Height: 1.74 m (5 ft 8 1/2 in)
- Position: Attacking midfielder

Youth career
- Real Madrid

Senior career*
Years	Team	Apps	(Gls)
1998–1999	Real Madrid C	6	(2)
1998–2003	Real Madrid B	106	(18)
2002–2003	→ Valladolid (loan)	19	(0)
2003–2006	Valladolid	84	(11)
2006–2009	Getafe	28	(3)
2009	→ Rayo Vallecano (loan)	17	(1)
2009–2011	Albacete	63	(5)
2012–2013	Nea Salamis	26	(1)
2013–2014	Xerez	10	(0)
Total		359	(42)

International career
1996	Spain U16	3	(0)
1997	Spain U17	10	(3)
1997–1999	Spain U18	17	(1)
1999	Spain U20	2	(1)
- * Club domestic league appearances and goals

Francisco David Sousa Franquelo (born 3 February 1980) is a Spanish former professional footballer who played as an attacking midfielder.

== Club career ==
Sousa was born in Málaga, Andalusia. A Real Madrid youth graduate who never made it past the B side as a senior, he played his first La Liga match for Real Valladolid (on loan from Madrid) on 31 August 2002, in a 1–0 away win against Racing de Santander. After another season with Valladolid – which now held the totality of the player's rights – ended in relegation, he would spend two further campaigns in the Segunda División, subsequently joining Getafe CF, a club from the capital outskirts, for 2006–07's top flight.

Sousa appeared sparingly for Getafe over two and a half seasons, scoring twice in a 4–2 loss at RCD Mallorca on 7 October 2007. He featured in no games whatsoever in the first part of 2008–09, which led to a January 2009 loan to second-tier Rayo Vallecano.

In summer 2009, Sousa was released by Getafe but continued in the second division, signing with Albacete Balompié and being relegated in his second year. In late January 2012, aged 31, he moved abroad for the first time in his career, joining several compatriots at Nea Salamis Famagusta FC in the Cypriot First Division.
