= Owusu Afriyie =

Ghanaian footballer (born 1980)

Personal information
- Full name: Owusu Afriyie Martin
- Date of birth: 1 September 1980 (age 46)
- Place of birth: Accra, Ghana
- Height: 1.70 m (5 ft 7 in)
- Position: Midfielder

Senior career*
Years	Team	Apps	(Gls)
1996–1997	Real Sportive		
1997–1998	Badajoz	17	(1)
1998–2001	Málaga	7	(0)
1999–2000	→ Chaves (loan)		
2001–2003	Hearts of Oak		
2003–2005	Feldkirchen		
2005	Linares	1	(0)
2005–2006	Melilla	6	(0)
2006	Enfield Town		
2006–2007	Hearts of Oak		
Total		31+	(1+)

International career
1997	Ghana U17	6	(4)
1999	Ghana U20	5	(1)
- * Club domestic league appearances and goals

Owusu Afriyie Martin (born 1 September 1980) is a Ghanaian former professional footballer. Nicknamed Arriki, he played as a midfielder in Ghana, Spain, Portugal, Austria, and England.

== Career ==
Born in Accra, Afriyie began his career with Real Sportive, before earning a move to Spanish side Badajoz after just a season. His performances ensured a move to bigger club Málaga, where he spent a season on loan at Portuguese club Chaves. In 2001 Arriky returned to Ghana to spend two seasons with Hearts of Oak, before spending a further two seasons in Austria with Feldkirchen. Short spells in Spain with Linares and Melilla, and in England with Enfield Town, preceded a final return to Hearts of Oak, where he finished his career in 2007.
