= Ricardo Martínez (footballer, born 1980) =

Mexican footballer

Ricardo Mauricio Martínez
Personal information
- Full name: Ricardo Mauricio Martínez Trimmer
- Date of birth: 1 June 1980 (age 46)
- Place of birth: Mexico City
- Height: 1.68 m (5 ft 6 in)
- Position: Midfielder

Senior career*
Years	Team	Apps	(Gls)
1998–2000	Monterrey	14	(0)
2000	Chivas	4	(0)
2004–2006	Monterrey	51	(2)
2006–2007	Santos	3	(0)
2007–2009	Monarcas Morelia	23	(0)
2009	Club León	9	(0)
2009–2011	Cruz Azul Hidalgo	5	(1)
2012	Lobos de la BUAP	0	(0)
- * Club domestic league appearances and goals as of 28 July 2012

Ricardo Mauricio Martínez Trimmer (born 1 June 1980 in Mexico, D. F., Mexico) is a Mexican former footballer. He played professionally as a midfielder in Liga MX.

== Biography ==
=== Career ===
Martínez made his debut in the Mexican Primera with Club de Futbol Monterrey in a match against Club Leon on 11 March 1998. He spent most of the next eight years with Monterrey before moving to Club Santos Laguna for a season.
