= Sherali Yuldashev =

Kyrgyz association football player

Personal information
- Full name: Sherali Yuldashev
- Date of birth: 17 July 1999 (age 27)
- Place of birth: Kyrgyzstan
- Height: 1.81 m (5 ft 11 in)
- Position: Striker

Youth career
- 2013–2017: IFK Norrköping

Senior career*
Years	Team	Apps	(Gls)
2017–2020	Assyriska Föreningen i Norrköping	45	(8)
2020–2021	Smedby AIS	10	(8)
2021–2022	IK Sleipner	18	(24)
2022–2023	Umeå FC	20	(2)
2023	Dainava	13	(0)

International career^{‡}
2022–	Kyrgyzstan	2	(0)
- * Club domestic league appearances and goals as of 26 January 2024 ‡ National team caps and goals as of 19:06, 1 April 2023 (UTC)

Sherali Yuldashev (Kyrgyz: Шерали Юлдашев; Russian: Шерали Юлдашев; born 17 July 1999) is a Kyrgyzstani footballer who plays as a striker for Dainava.

== Early life ==
Born in Kyrgyzstan, Yuldashev moved to Sweden as a child. In Kyrgyzstan, he had been nicknamed "Pelé's son" due to his talent and the fact that his father was a former footballer.

== Career ==
=== Youth career ===
As a youth player, Yuldashev joined the youth academy of Swedish side IFK Norrköping.

=== Senior club career ===
Before the 2021 season, he signed for Sleipner in the Swedish fourth tier. Before the 2022 season, he signed for Swedish third-tier club Umeå FC. Yuldashev scored first goal for Umeå FC during a 2–2 draw with Täby FK. Before the 2023 season, he signed for Dainava in Lithuania.

=== International career ===
On 24 September 2022, Yuldashev debuted for Kyrgyzstan during a 1–2 loss to Russia.

== Style of play ==
He mainly operates as a central midfielder.

== Personal life ==
He has attended IFK Norrköping games as a supporter.
