= Issah Mohammed =

Ghana footballer (born 1980)

Personal information
- Full name: Issah Mohammed
- Date of birth: 20 December 1980 (age 45)
- Place of birth: Ghana
- Height: 1.74 m (5 ft 8 1/2 in)
- Position: Forward

Senior career*
Years	Team	Apps	(Gls)
1997–2001	Sekondi Hasaacas		
2002	IFK Norrköping	11	(1)
2003	Sekondi Hasaacas		
2005	Accra Hearts of Oak	2	(0)
2007–2008	Hapoel Bnei Lod		
2008	Assyriska Föreningen i Norrköping	6	(6)
2009	Assyriska Föreningen i Norrköping	23	(8)
2012	IF Älgarna	10	(0)

International career
2000–2001	Ghana	8	(0)
- * Club domestic league appearances and goals

Issah Mohammed (born 20 December 1980) is a Ghanaian former professional footballer who played as a forward. Emerging as a prolific striker with Sekondi Hasaacas F.C. in the Ghana Premier League, he was called up to the Ghana national football team and earned eight cups between 2000 and 2001.

In 2002, Mohammed joined IFK Norrköping in Sweden’s Allsvenskan, where he made an immediate impact by scoring twice in a pre-season friendly against AIK and was regarded as a highly promising signing. Despite this early promise, his opportunities became limited following a coaching change, and his career later included spells with Hearts of Oak and Hapoel Bnei Lod in Israel. He returned to Sweden in 2008 after his time in Israel and played Division 3 football.

== Club career ==
=== Early career ===
Mohammed began his career in Ghana with Sekondi Hasaacas, competing in the Ghana Premier League. Between 2000 and 2001 he gained recognition as a prolific striker, scoring multiple goals that earned him attention from both the national team and European clubs.

=== IFK Norrköping ===
In February 2002, Mohammed signed a three-year contract with Swedish club IFK Norrköping, a move confirmed by UEFA. He impressed in pre-season, scoring twice in a friendly against AIK. Mohammed went on to play 11 Allsvenskan matches, scoring one goal during the 2002 season.

However, after the dismissal of head coach Bengt-Arne Strömberg, his successor Håkan Ericson was reported by Ghanaian media to have shown less confidence in Mohammed, which limited his playing opportunities.

In September 2002 IFK Norrköping club doctor Jan Ericson reported that Issah had sustained a career threatening knee injury requiring months of rehabilitation which consequently ended his career in the club.

=== Return to Ghana ===
After his spell in Sweden, Mohammed returned to Ghana, rejoining Sekondi Hasaacas in 2003. He later joined Hearts of Oak in 2005, making a handful of appearances.

=== Hapoel Bnei Lod ===
In 2007, Mohammed signed with Israeli club Hapoel Bnei Lod, then playing in Liga Leumit, the country’s second division. His tenure in Israel during the 2007–08 season marked his final documented professional club experience.

=== Return to Sweden ===
In August 2008, Mohammed returned to Sweden and joined local side Assyriska Föreningen i Norrköping in Division 3. He made an immediate impact: Swedish local media reported three goals in his first four matches and five goals in five appearances during the promotion push that autumn. He had initially come in to keep fit and was quickly registered to play; local coverage credited him with two goals in his first two outings for the club. A short-stay visa meant his initial stint ended in early September 2008, but he returned for the 2009 season and continued to feature and score in Division 3 matches, including against Vimmerby IF. Match records also show him involved in further league fixtures that year, such as the 2–1 win over IK Östria Lambohov on 12 June 2009.

== International career ==
Mohammed was capped for the Ghana national football team between 2000 and 2001, making eight FIFA-recognized appearances without scoring. He participated in both 2002 FIFA World Cup qualification (CAF) matches and Africa Cup of Nations qualification fixtures, as well as several friendlies.
