= List of Assyrian football teams in Sweden =

The following is a list of Assyrian football teams in Sweden.

The Swedish football league system currently has ten levels, with the first five being governed by the Swedish Football Association. The sixth to tenth levels are controlled by regional associations.

Team	City	Established	Division Name	Level
Arameisk-Syrianska IF	Botkyrka, Stockholm	1980	Division 1 Norra	3
Assyriska FF	Södertälje, Stockholm	1974	Division 1 Norra	3
Syrianska FC	Södertälje, Stockholm	1977	Division 2 Södra Svealand	4
Assyriska BK	Gothenburg	1985	Division 2 Västra Götaland	4
Assyriska IK	Jönköping	2009	Division 2 Östra Götaland	4
Örebro Syrianska IF	Örebro	1977	Division 2 Norra Götaland	4
Assyriska IF Norrköping	Norrköping	1977	Division 3 Nordöstra Götaland	5
Syrianska Eskilstuna IF	Eskilstuna	2003	Division 3 Södra Svealand	5
Syrianska IF Kerburan	Västerås	1977	Division 3 Norra Svealand	5
Assyriska FC	Västerås	2008	Division 4 Västmanland	6
Eskilstuna Babylon IF	Eskilstuna	2004	Division 4 Södermanland	6
FC Assyriska Örebro	Örebro	2006	Division 4 Örebro	6
Azech SF	Norrköping	1980	Division 5 Östergötland Östra	7
Mjölby Turabdin FC	Mjölby	1993	Division 5 Östergötland Västra	7
Syrianska FF	Enköping	2013	Division 5 Uppland Västra	7
Syrianska IF	Norrköping	1977	Division 5 Östergötland Östra	7
Syrianska/Arameiska Föreningen	Gothenburg		Division 6 Göteborg A	8
IF Verdandi/Syrianska Eskilstuna IF	Eskilstuna	2004	Division 6 Södermanland Nordvästra	8
Edessa Syrianska KIF	Stockholm		Division 7 Stockholm A	9
Suryoye Botkyrka KIF	Botkyrka, Stockholm		Division 7 Stockholm I	9
Märsta Syrianska FC	Märsta, Stockholm		Division 8 Uppland Västra	10

Valsta Syrianska IK from Märsta, Stockholm existed between 1993–2015 and reached as high as the third tier.
