= Azech SF =

Swedish football club

- Full name: Azech Syrianska Föreningen
- Nickname(s): ASF
- Founded: 1980
- Dissolved: 2021
- Ground: Idrottsparken (Södra); Norrköping; Sweden
Home colours	Away colours

Azech SF was a Swedish football club located in Norrköping. The club was named after the town of Azech in modern-day Turkey.

They merged with IK Derik and Assyriska Föreningen i Norrköping to form Assyriska Derik Azech Syrianska, ADAS United, in 2021.

== History ==
Azech SF were affiliated to Östergötlands Fotbollförbund.

== Season to season ==
Season	Level	Division	Section	Position	Movements
1999	Tier 7	Division 6	Östergötland Östra	2nd	Promoted
2000	Tier 6	Division 5	Östergötland Östra	1st	Promoted
2001	Tier 5	Division 4	Östergötland Östra	7th	
2002	Tier 5	Division 4	Östergötland Östra	11th	Relegated
2003	Tier 6	Division 5	Östergötland Östra	3rd	
2004	Tier 6	Division 5	Östergötland Östra	2nd	
2005	Tier 6	Division 5	Östergötland Östra	2nd	Promoted
2006*	Tier 6	Division 4	Östergötland Östra	10th	
2007	Tier 6	Division 4	Östergötland Östra	11th	Relegated
2008	Tier 7	Division 5	Östergötland Östra	2nd	Promoted
2009	Tier 6	Division 4	Östergötland Östra	8th	
2010	Tier 6	Division 4	Östergötland Östra	3rd	
2011	Tier 6	Division 4	Östergötland Östra	6th	
2014	Tier 3	Division 4	Östergötland Östra	1st	Promoted

* League restructuring in 2006 resulted in a new division being created at Tier 3 and subsequent divisions dropping a level.

== See also ==
- List of Assyrian football teams in Sweden
