= Märsta =

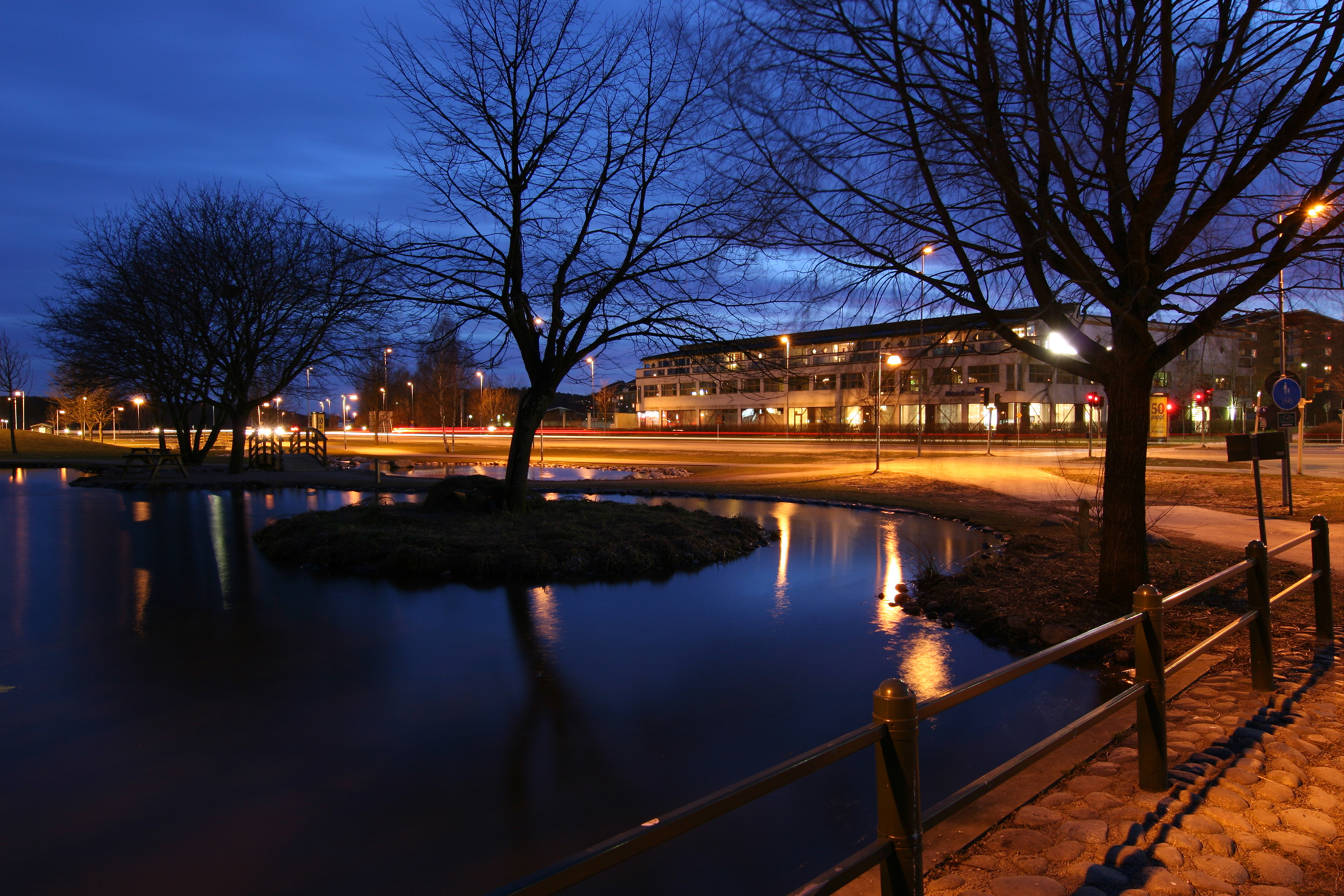
- Märsta at night (Märstapunkten)

- Coat of arms

- Location within Stockholm Location within Sweden Location within European Union
- Coordinates: 59°37′N 17°51′E
- Country: Sweden
- Province: Uppland
- County: Stockholm County
- Municipality: Sigtuna Municipality

Area
  - Total: 7.64 km^{2} (2.95 sq mi)

Population (31 December 2020)
  - Total: 29,815
  - Density: 3,900/km^{2} (10,100/sq mi)
- Time zone: UTC+1 (CET)
  - Summer (DST): UTC+2 (CEST)

Märsta (Swedish: [ˈmæ̂ːʂʈa]) is a suburb of Metropolitan Stockholm, a locality and the seat of Sigtuna Municipality, Stockholm County, Sweden with 27,034 inhabitants in 2015. The town is situated close to Stockholm's main international airport, Arlanda. Even though its origins go back to around 500 AD, Märsta is a widespread modern residential area. Märsta has a mix of multi-storey dwellings and smaller houses. It is in a phase of expansion and new residential areas are built both in central parts of Märsta and in the surrounding areas such as Steningehöjden. Märsta can be reached by Stockholm commuter rail trains running at quarterly intervals during daytime and by bus from Stockholm Arlanda Airport. The central parts of Märsta has a shopping area "Märsta Centrum" with various shops, pub and restaurants. Another smaller shopping area is "Valsta Centrum". East of the central parts of Märsta there is an industrial area and a bit further east close to the airport a shopping mall "Eurostop". Most parts of Märsta and the municipality of Sigtuna can be reached with local bus services originating at the Märsta railway station and also connecting with commuter trains.

== Name ==
The origin of the name Märsta goes back to around 500 AD. At that time most of the valleys in Märsta were still under water, which explains the name. Mär- is found in the Swedish word "mjärde" which is a fishing tool, and -sta means a place (area or somekind of habitat) like the Swedish word "stad" meaning city. Märsta means "place to fish" or "fishing-place".

== Geography ==
Märsta is situated north of Steningevik, which is a bay of the lake Mälaren. The center of the town is located in a valley called Märstadal and the area Sätuna, which also holds the train station of the town.

The rest of the town's buildings spread upon and below the hills that form the valleys in Märsta. The stream that flows through the town out to Steningevik is called Märstaån. It is also located along the motorway E4 about 37 km north of central Stockholm, 33 km south of Uppsala and about 4 km from Arlanda Airport.

== Coat of arms ==
The coat of arms of Märsta resulted from merging the seals of the two hundreds of Ärlinghundra and Seminghundra, which are today located in Märsta. The combined seal, showing a key and axe crossed in gold on a blood-red ground, is known to have been in use from 1568. The key was the symbol of Ärlinghundra and symbolised "the key to heaven's gates". The axe was the symbol of Seminghundra and symbolized the axe which killed Saint Olaf; Seminghundra was also known as an execution place for convicts during the Middle Ages.

Märsta existed as a municipality of its own between 1952 and 1970. The coat of arms was created in 1954 and became obsolete as municipal arms when Märsta was merged into Sigtuna Municipality in 1971.

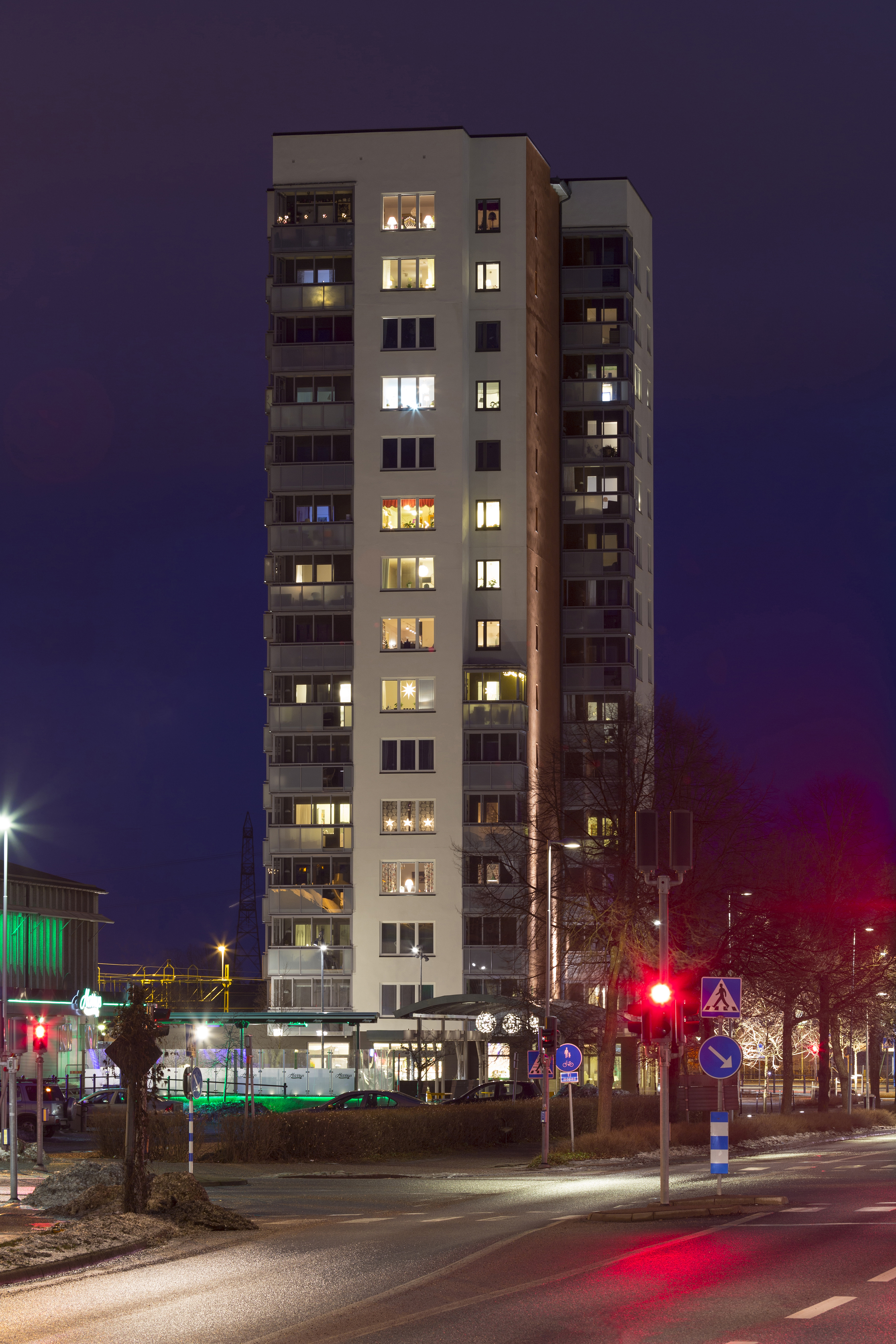
High rise at Märsta Railway Station

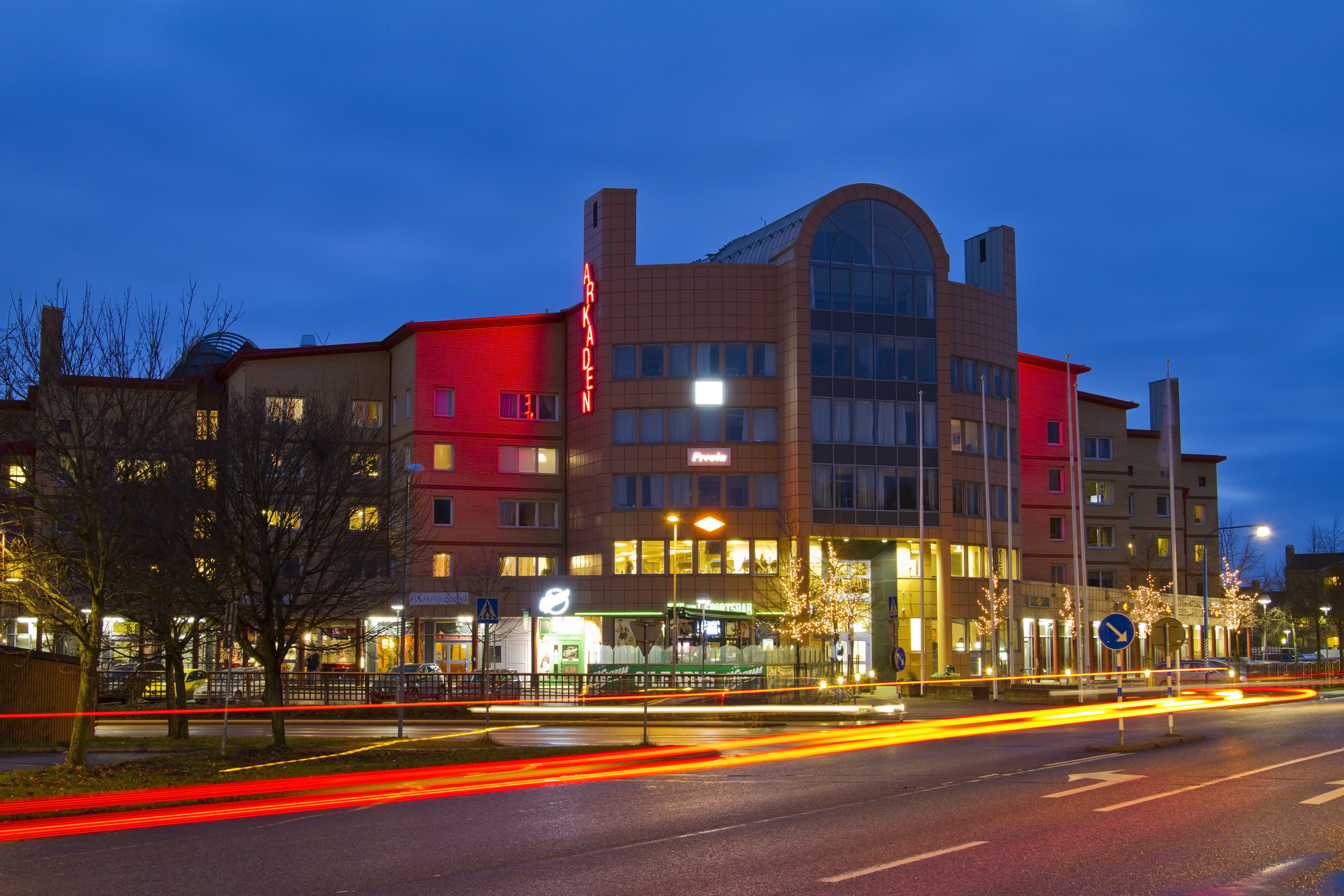
Arkaden in Märsta City housing restaurants, offices and a gym

== History ==
The area has been populated since the Stone Age and due to the location of traditional Viking-land has rich archaeological remains from the Bronze Age, Iron Age and Viking Age. There are many runestones and older ruins of stone castles and walls in the Märsta area.

The area of today's modern Märsta consisted of big farms and small communities, that were (and still are) typical for the landscape of the province Uppland. Märsta was just one of these farms but due to the location and importance of travelling between Stockholm and Uppsala, the farm had to turn into an inn. The important travelling road can be traced back to the Viking Age and even older ages.

During the days of the Swedish Empire many of the old nobles became land owners in the area and built palaces like Steninge, Skånelaholm, Rosersberg and Venngarn. Even Sweden's oldest public school is located in Husby-Ärlinghundra, the parish of Märsta. It was built in 1697 and is today a museum.

The first telegraph pole in Sweden was placed in Märsta 1853 and the train station got built in the 1860s. It is currently the northern termini of the commuter railways in Stockholm, and a minor interchange to SJ. The name Märsta got along only because it was common for travellers even though they were placed on neighbouring farms.

The Märsta municipality was formed in 1952 due to a fusion of the parishes of Husby-Ärlinghundra, Norrsunda, Odensala and Skånela. In 1967 the parishes of Vidbo, Lunda and Skepptuna also merged into the municipality. In 1971 the cities of Sigtuna and Märsta were forged together and formed Sigtuna Municipality with Märsta as the seat of the ruling council.

In 1957 the Swedish government decided to build Stockholm's new international airport, Stockholm Arlanda, at Halmsjön, east of Märsta. In its decision the government mentioned the building of a town where the employees at the new airport could live. The town was located IN Märsta. A plan for the residential area was made in 1960 and during the 1960s the population of Märsta quadrupled. A large part of the buildings in Märsta was built in the 1960s. Expansion of Märsta to the east is restricted due to the 55 dB(A) noise area restrictions in force. There are not many older houses in the central parts of Märsta but south of Märsta, Steninge Castle is located, with an environment dating back to 1690. Steninge Castle is a popular tourist attraction.

== Culture and education ==
There is a private cinema, "Biokällan i Forum" in Märsta.

There is a public theatre facility, Sigtuna Municipal Theatre, "Kulturum" which is Märstas venue for theater, concerts and conferences. The theater was completed in autumn 1980 and was inaugurated in November of that year. The salon has 454 seats. Local productions, performances and conferences are held at "Kulturum". The theater is used for many different purposes, such as local productions, performances, arts school concerts, conferences and more. Once a month the City Council uses the Sigtuna Municipal Theatre as meeting room. Kulturum is in the same building as Märstas gymnasium, (Arlandagymnasiet).

Like many similar sized Swedish towns and central communities Märsta has pre school and pedagogical care facilities available to its citizens and also high schools and a gymnasium, (Arlandagymnasiet). Märsta also has a school for adult education. There is a public library in the town centre, (Märsta Centrum).

== Business and employment ==
There are some local businesses in Märsta and also two major factories producing paint, Beckers Industrial Coatings AB, producing industrial paint, and Becker Acroma, now part of Sherwin-Williams. There are also some transport and spedition companies in the area. But most employment opportunities for people living in Märsta are at Stockholm Arlanda Airport and in Stockholm City.

== Gallery ==
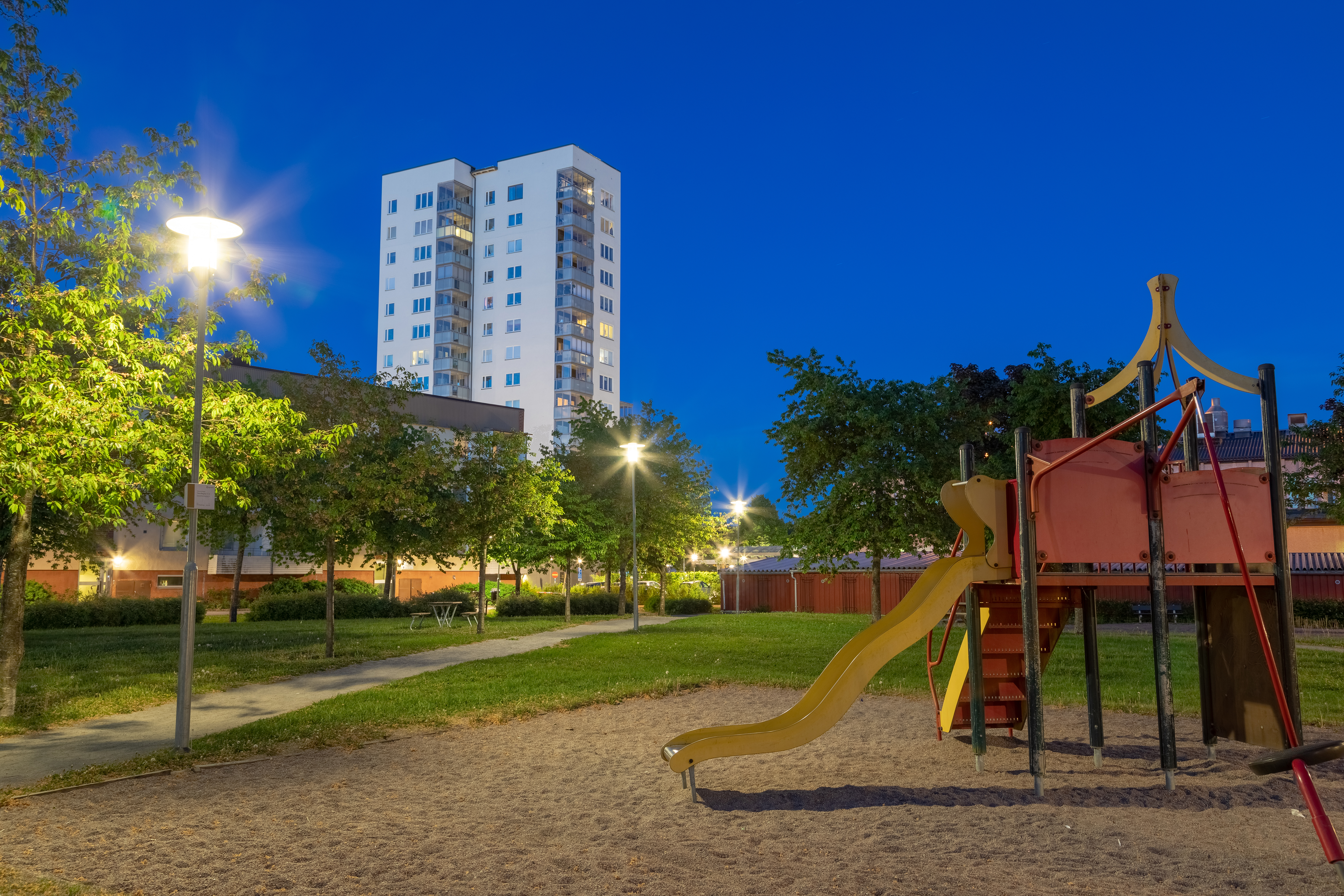
Residential area in Märsta

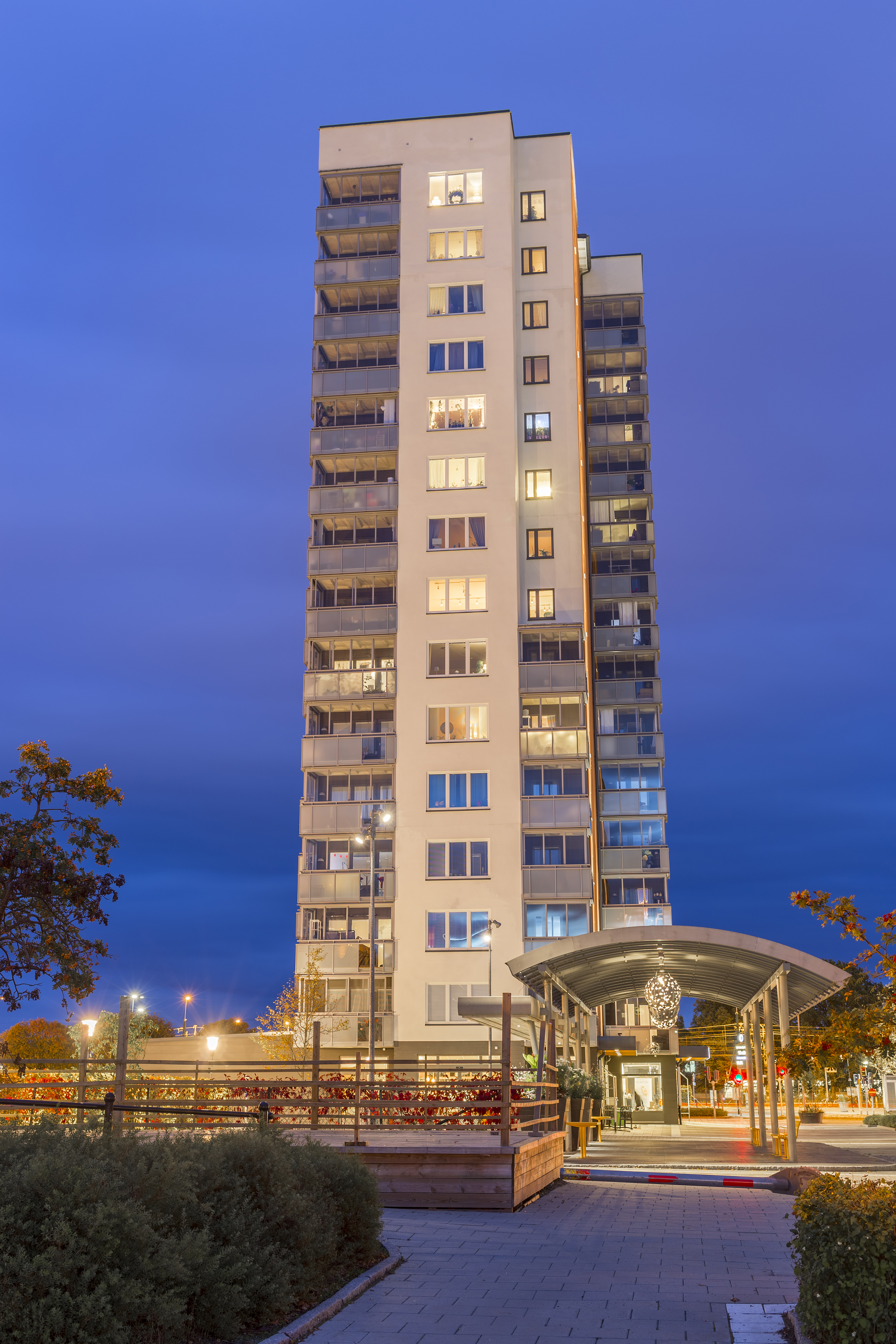
Residential high rise in Märsta

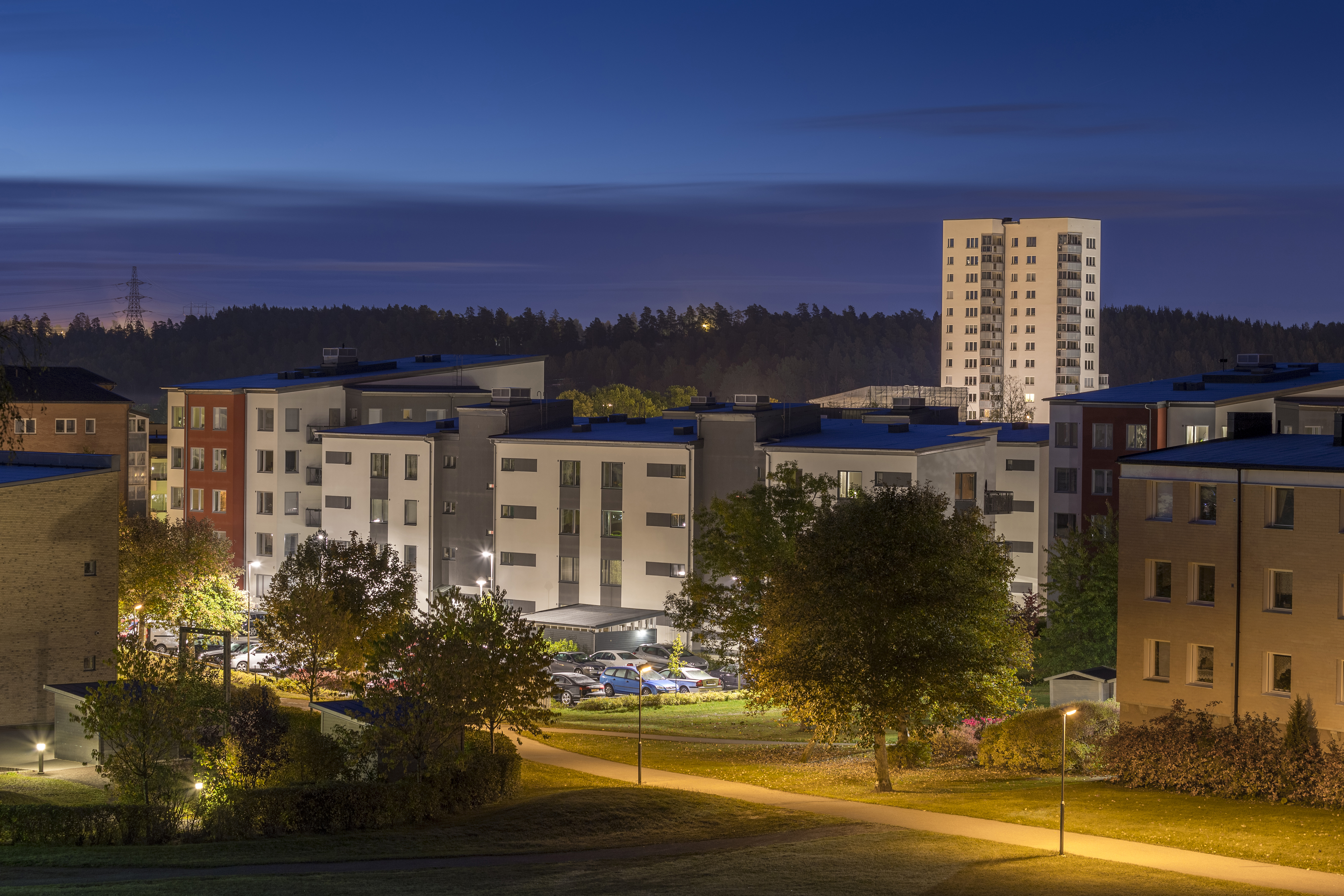
Central parts of Märsta

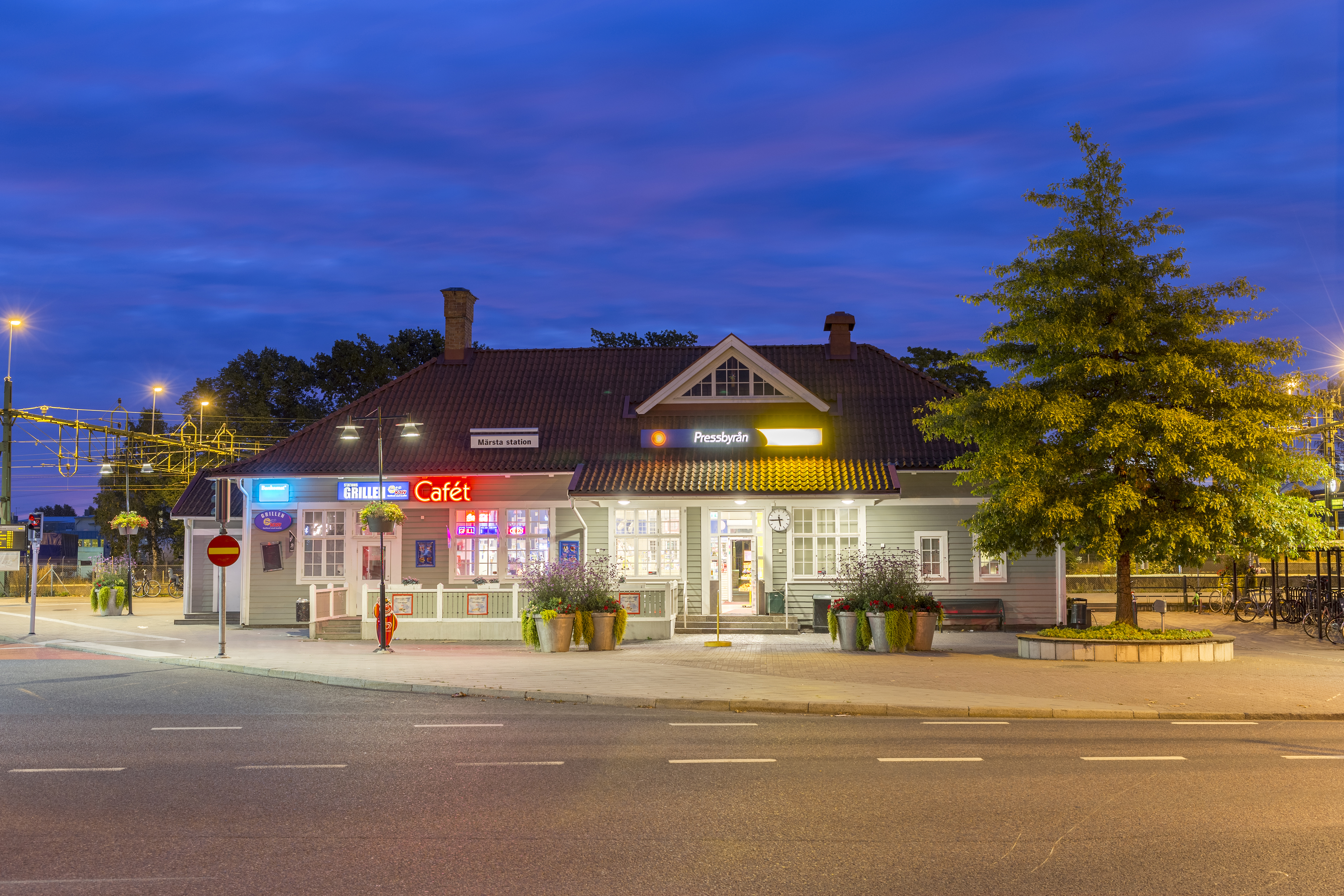
Märsta Railway Station

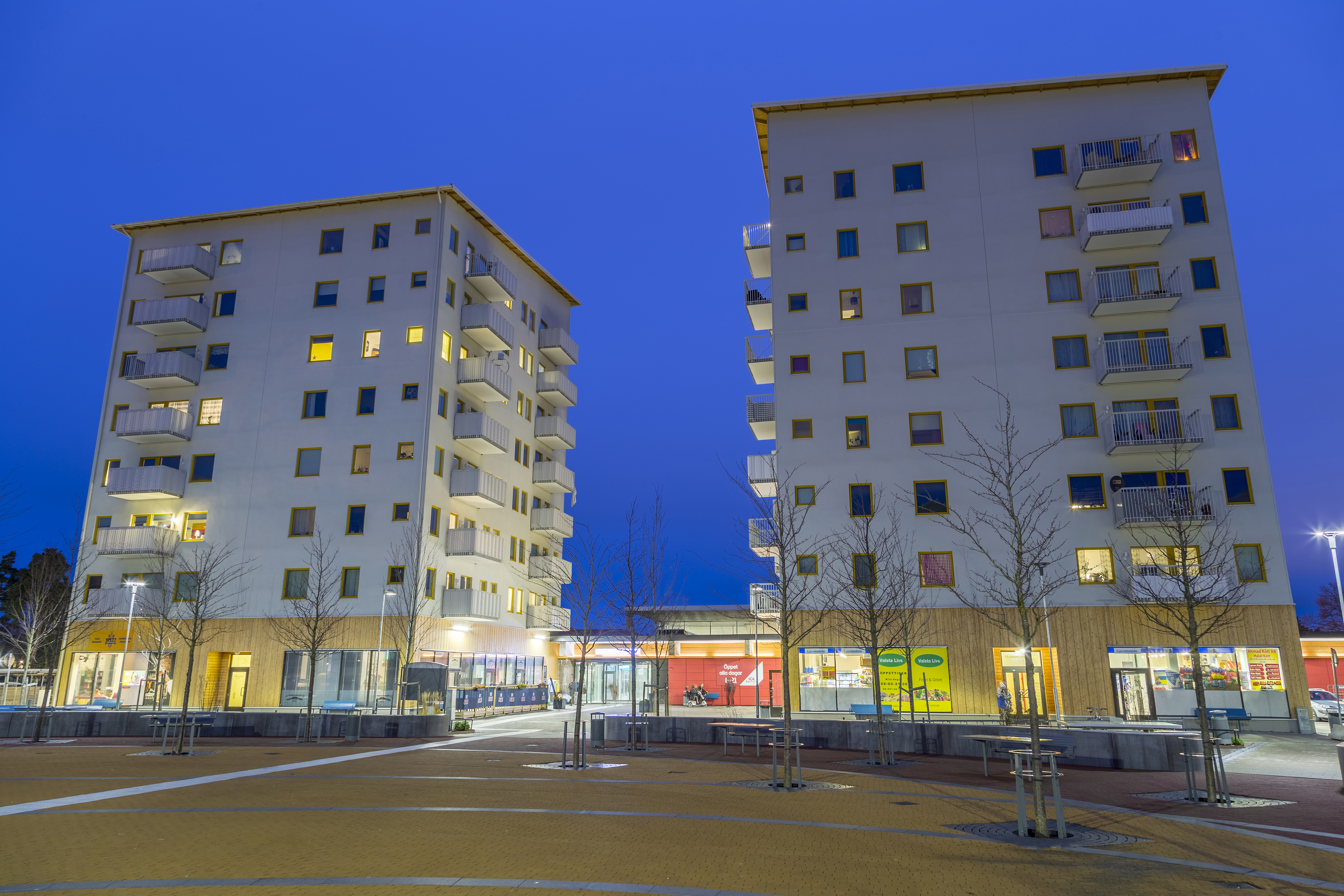
Valsta Centrum

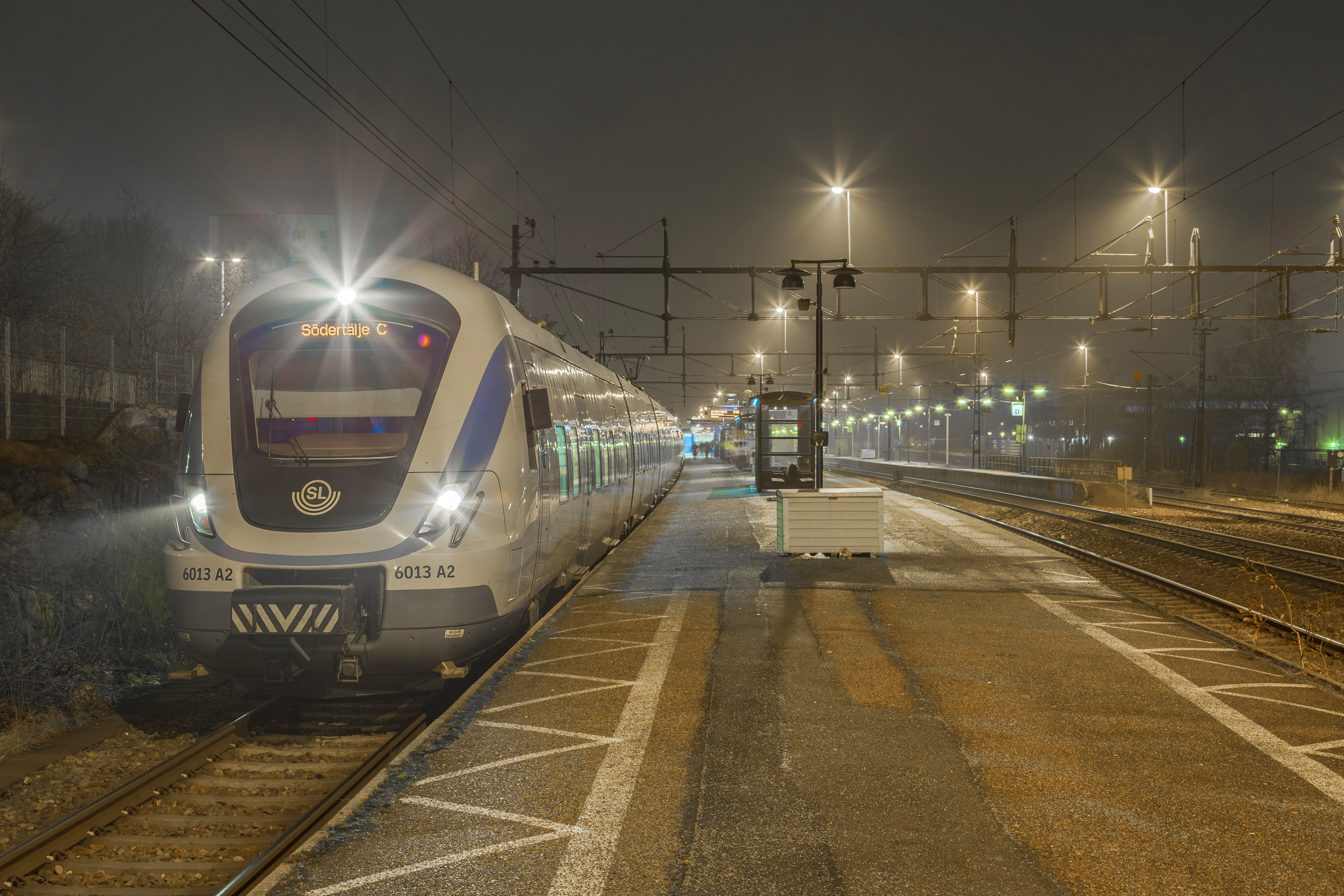
Commutertrain at Märsta Railway Station

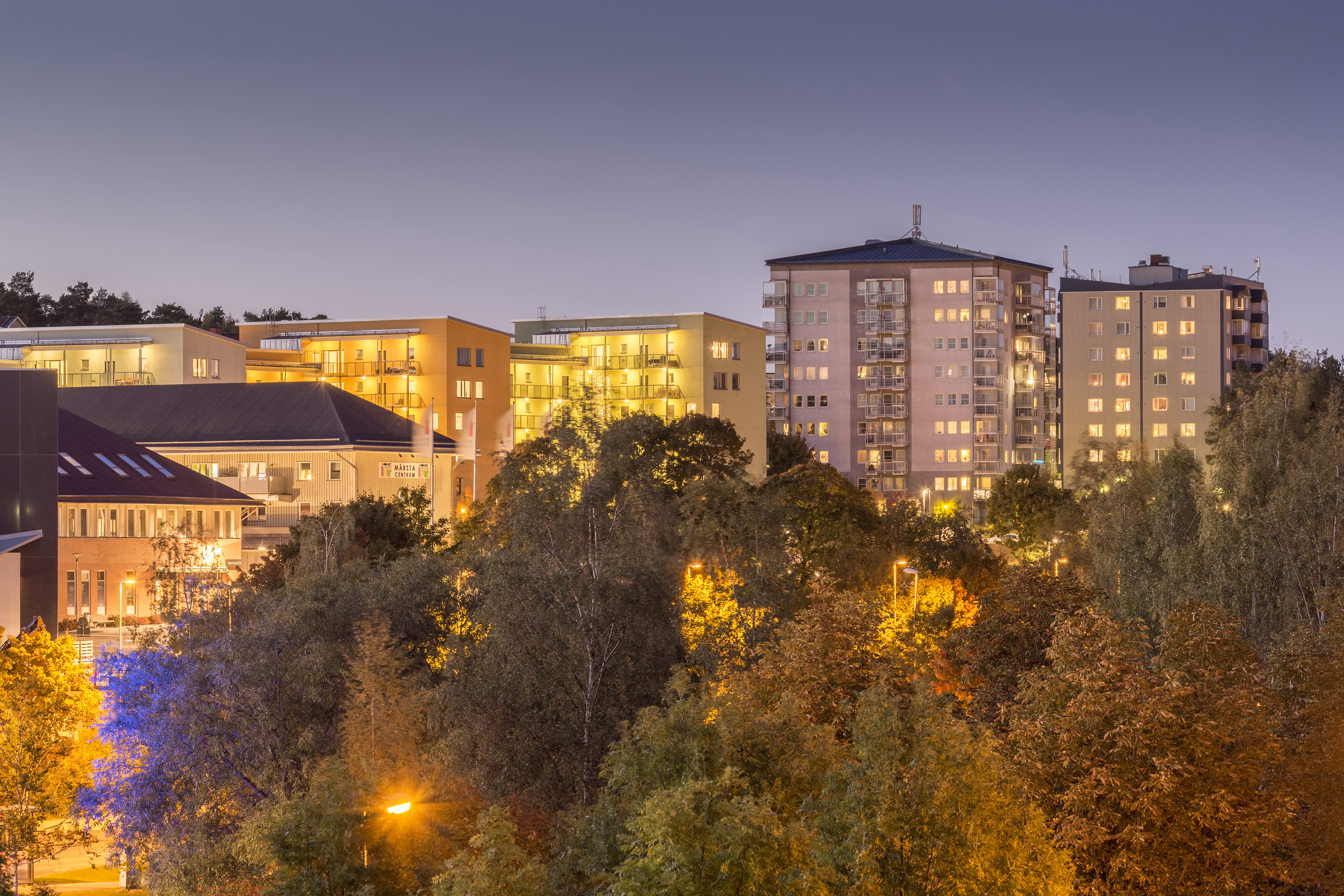
Märsta in the evening

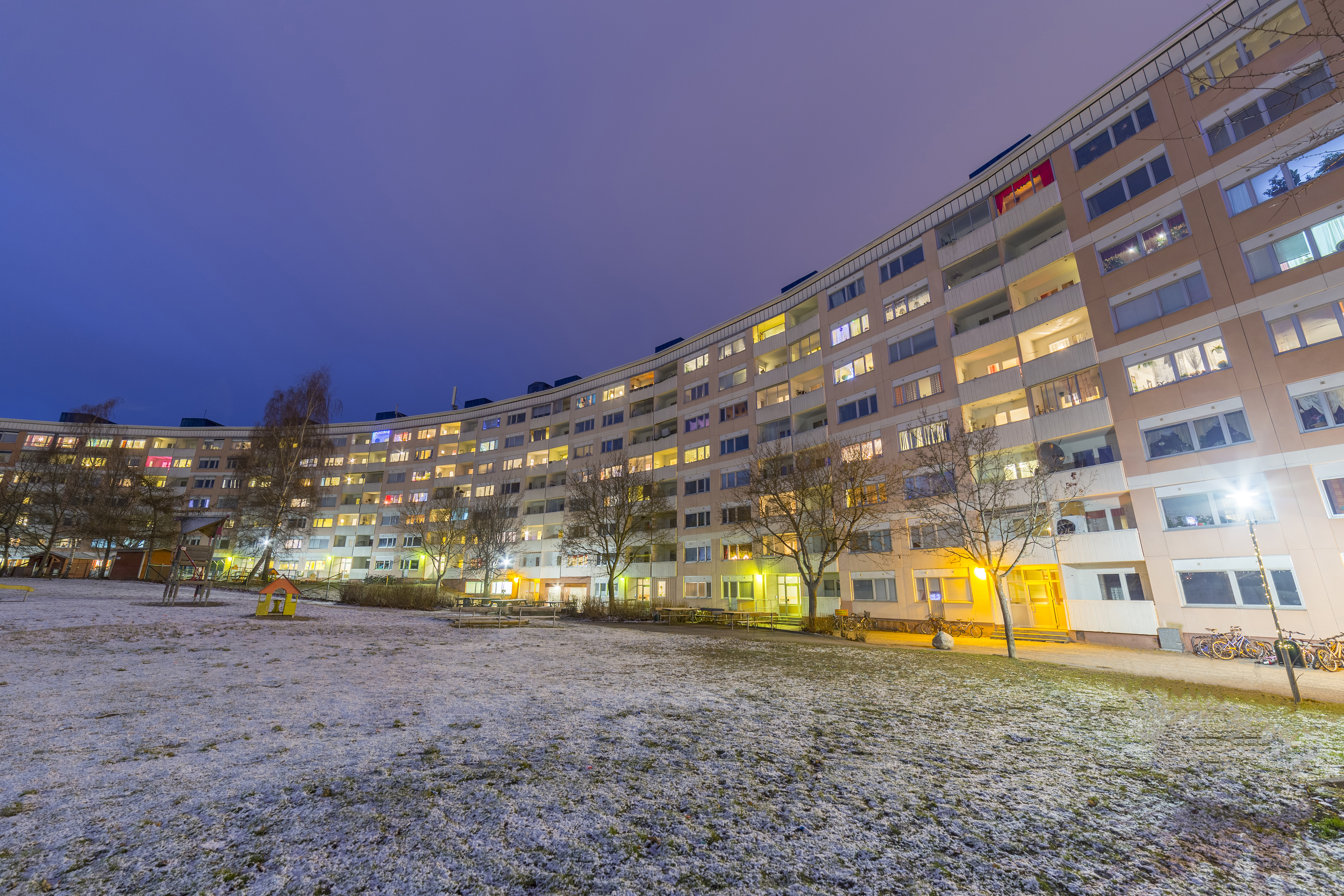
Large residential complex in Tingvalla, Märsta

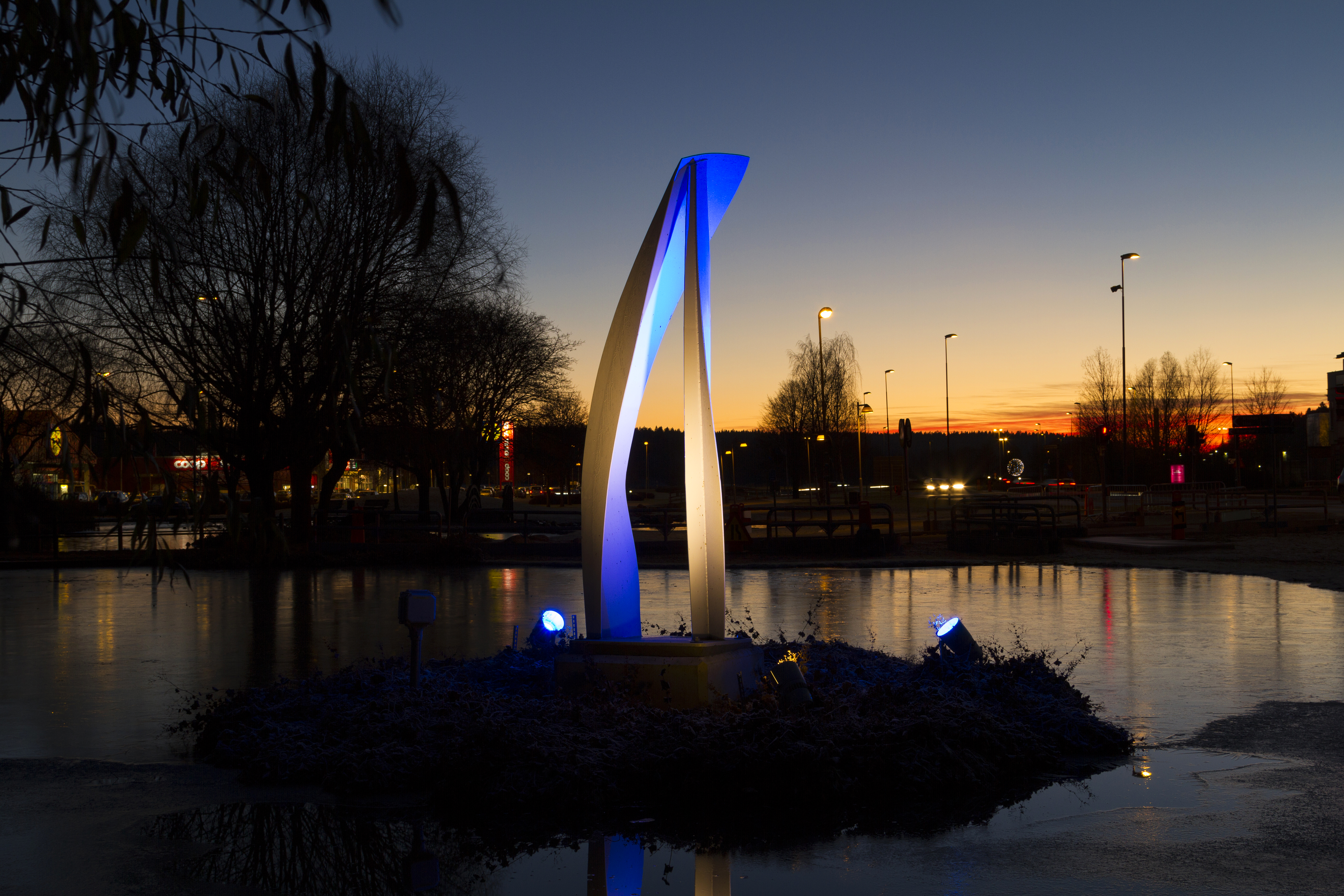
The sculpture "Blue Shape" by Larz Eldbåge in Märsta

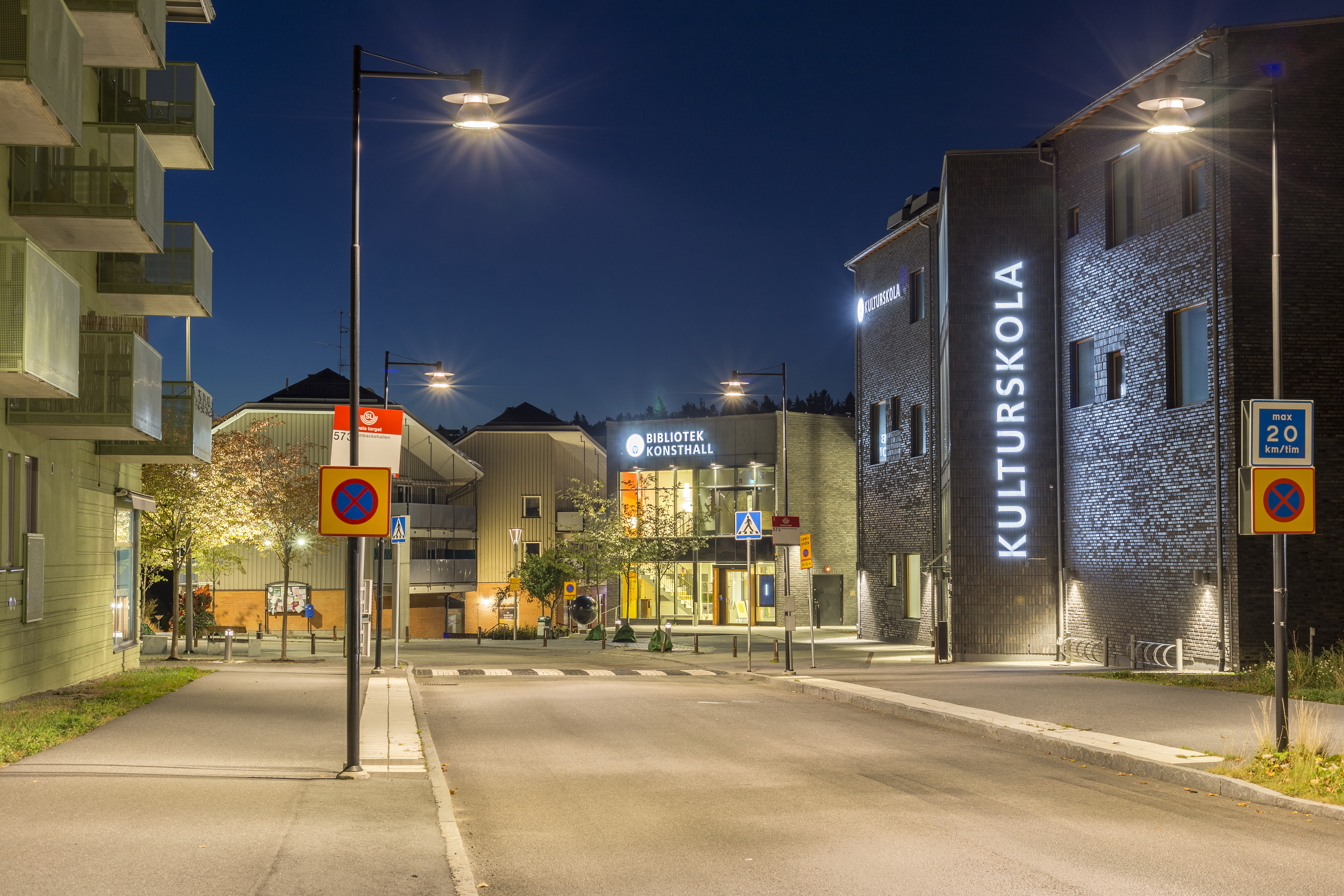
Märsta Music and Culture School and Library

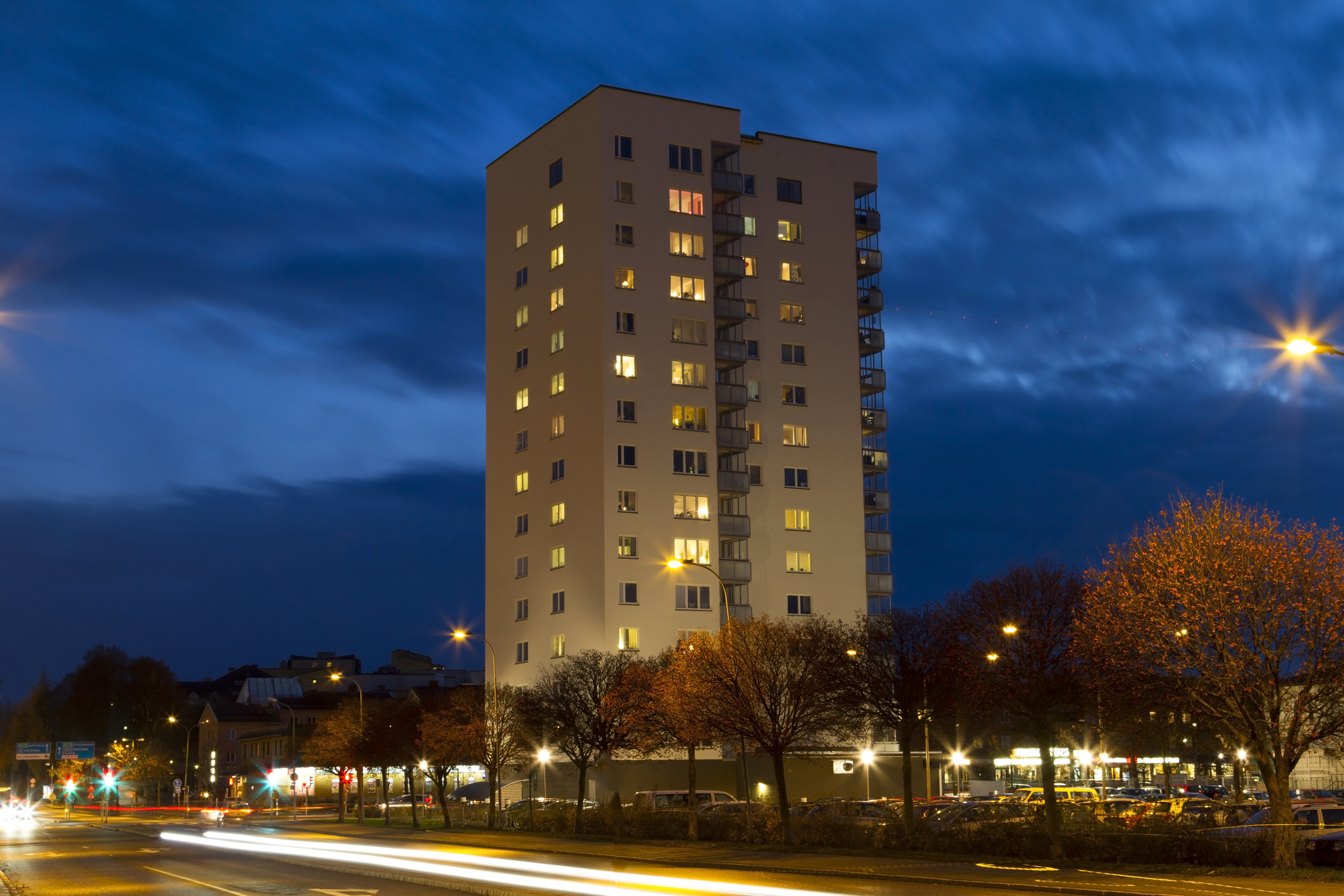
High rise in central parts of Märsta

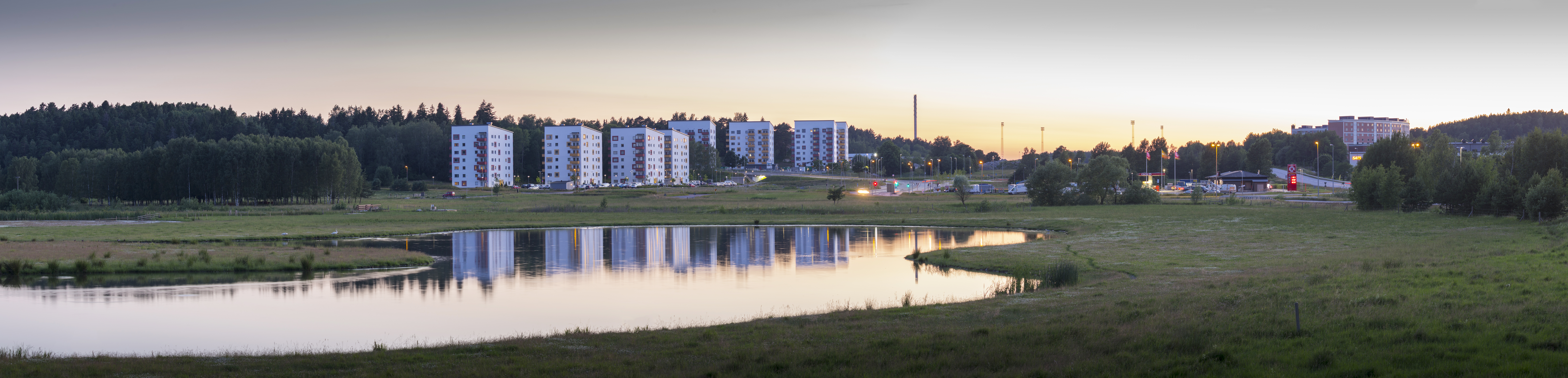
Märsta Entrance Residential Area

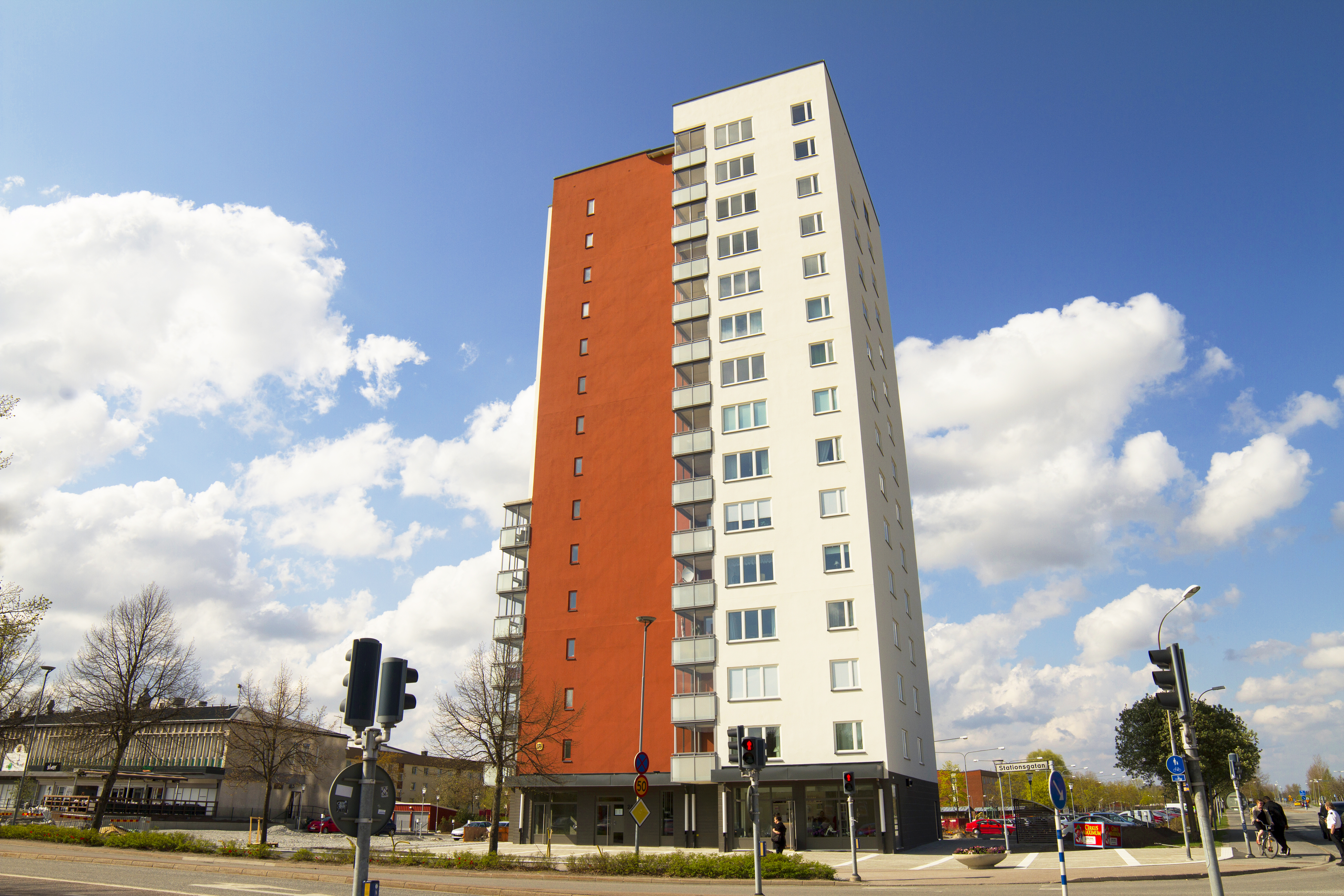
New high rise at Märsta railway station seen from south

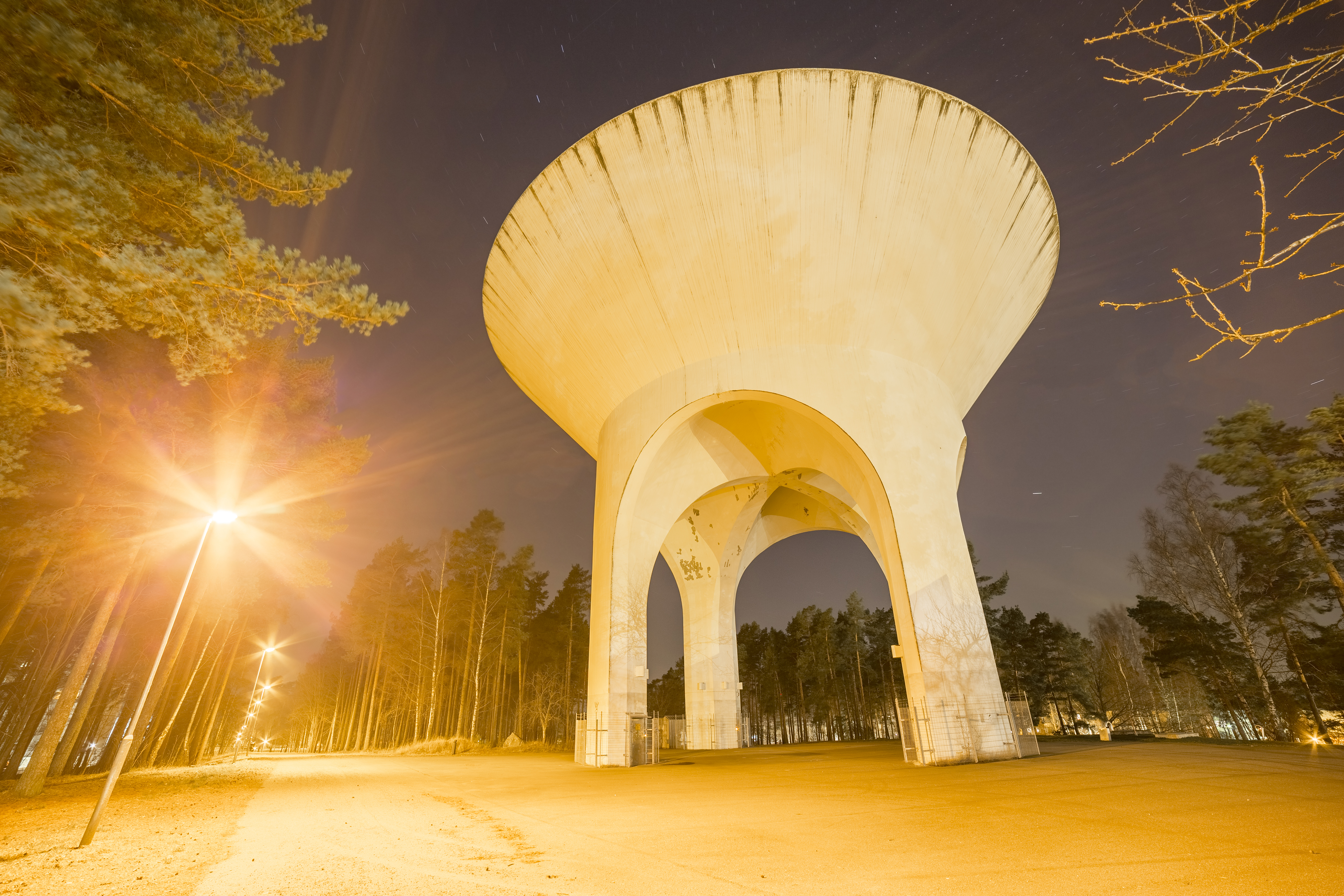
Valsta Watertower in Märsta By Night

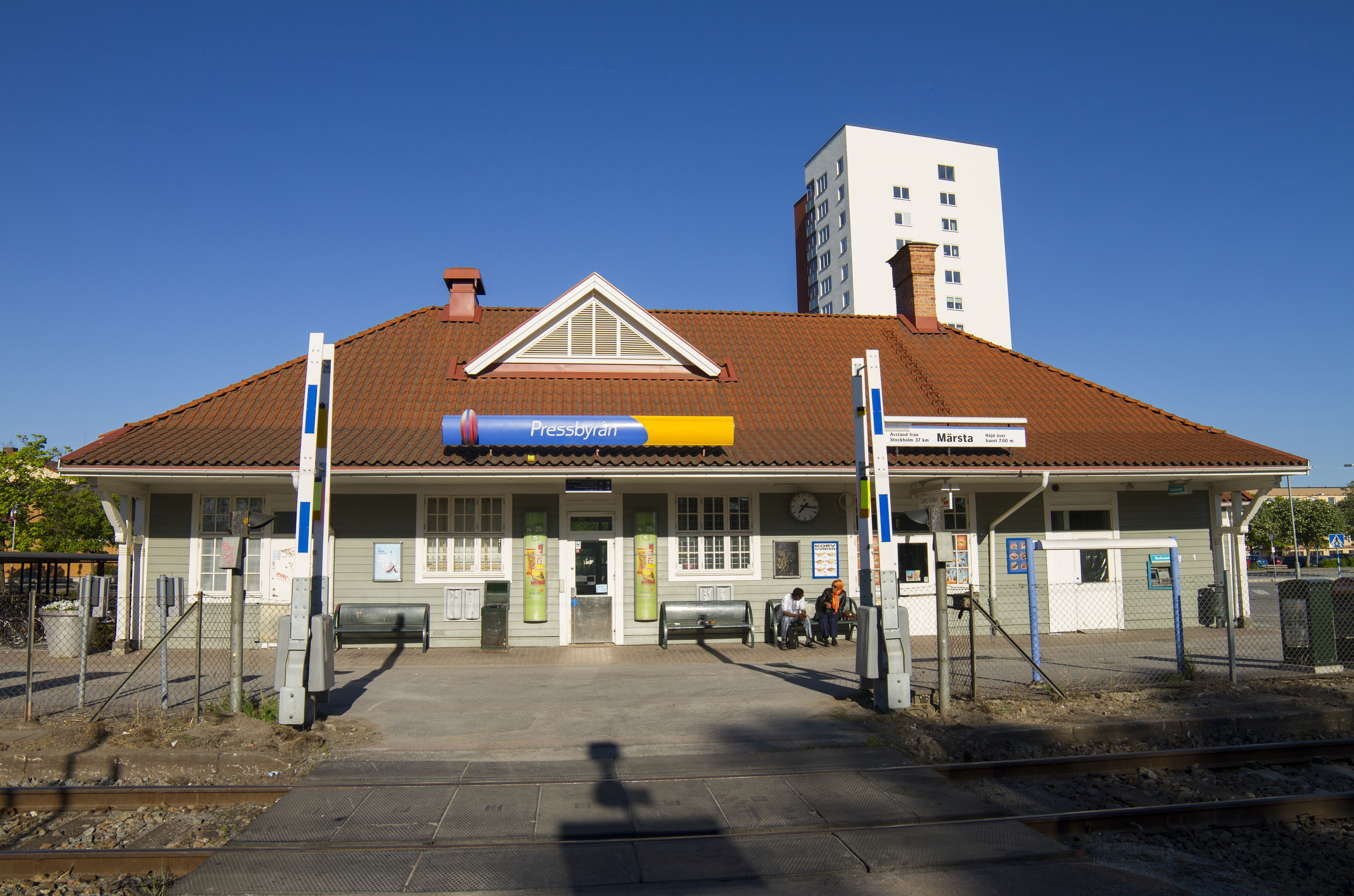
Märsta railway station seen from train side.

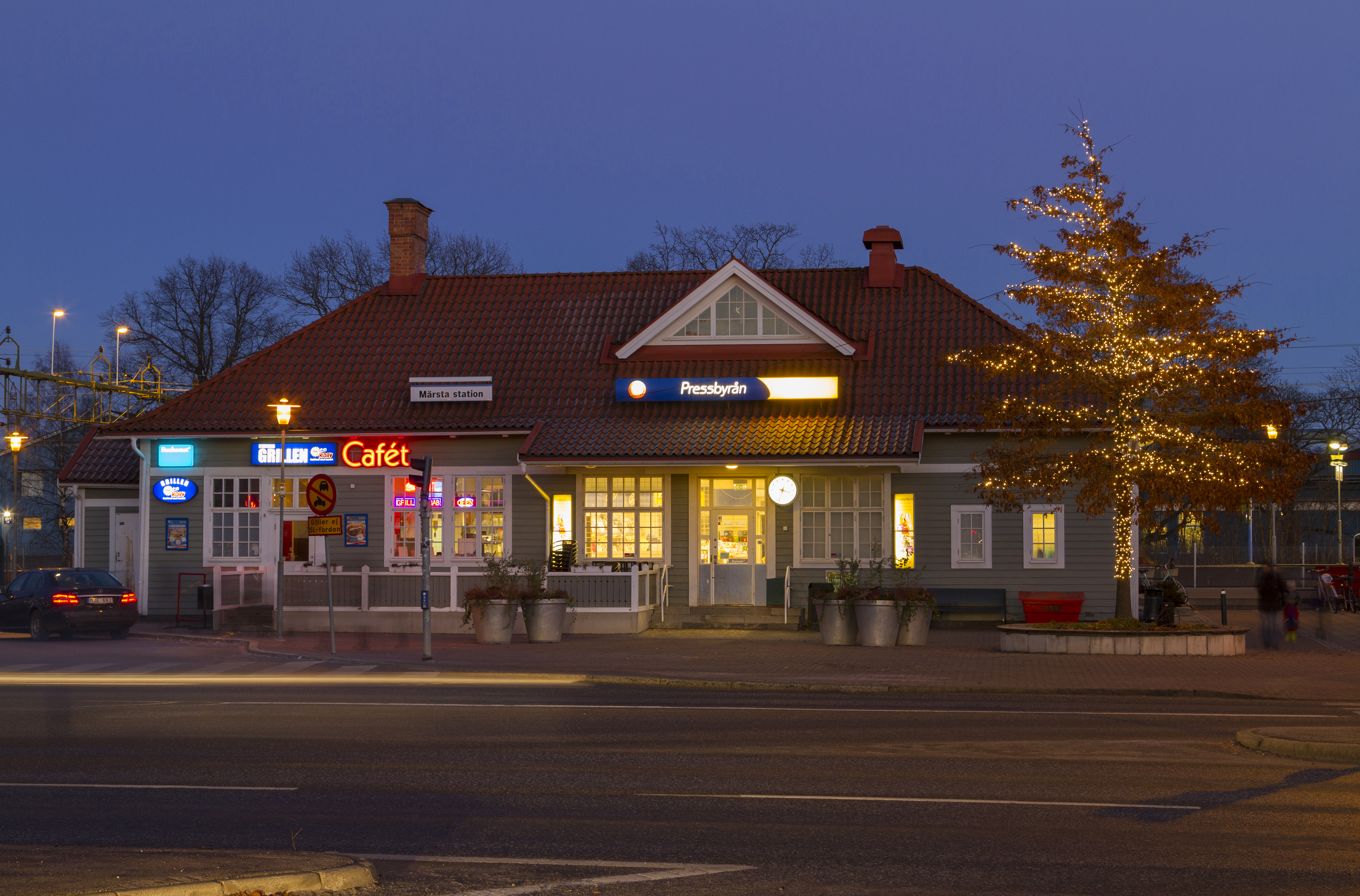
Märsta railway station

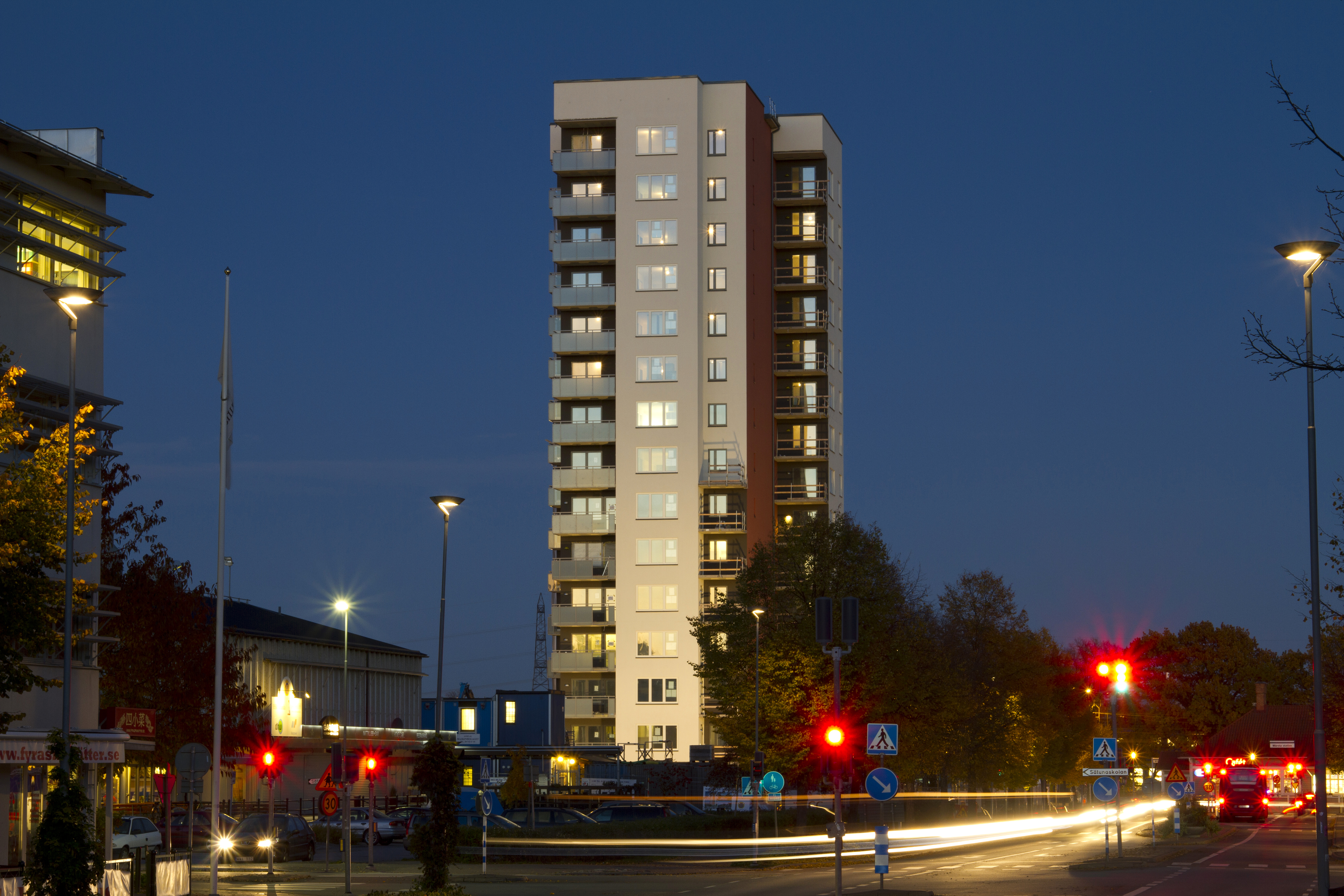
High rise at Märsta railway station

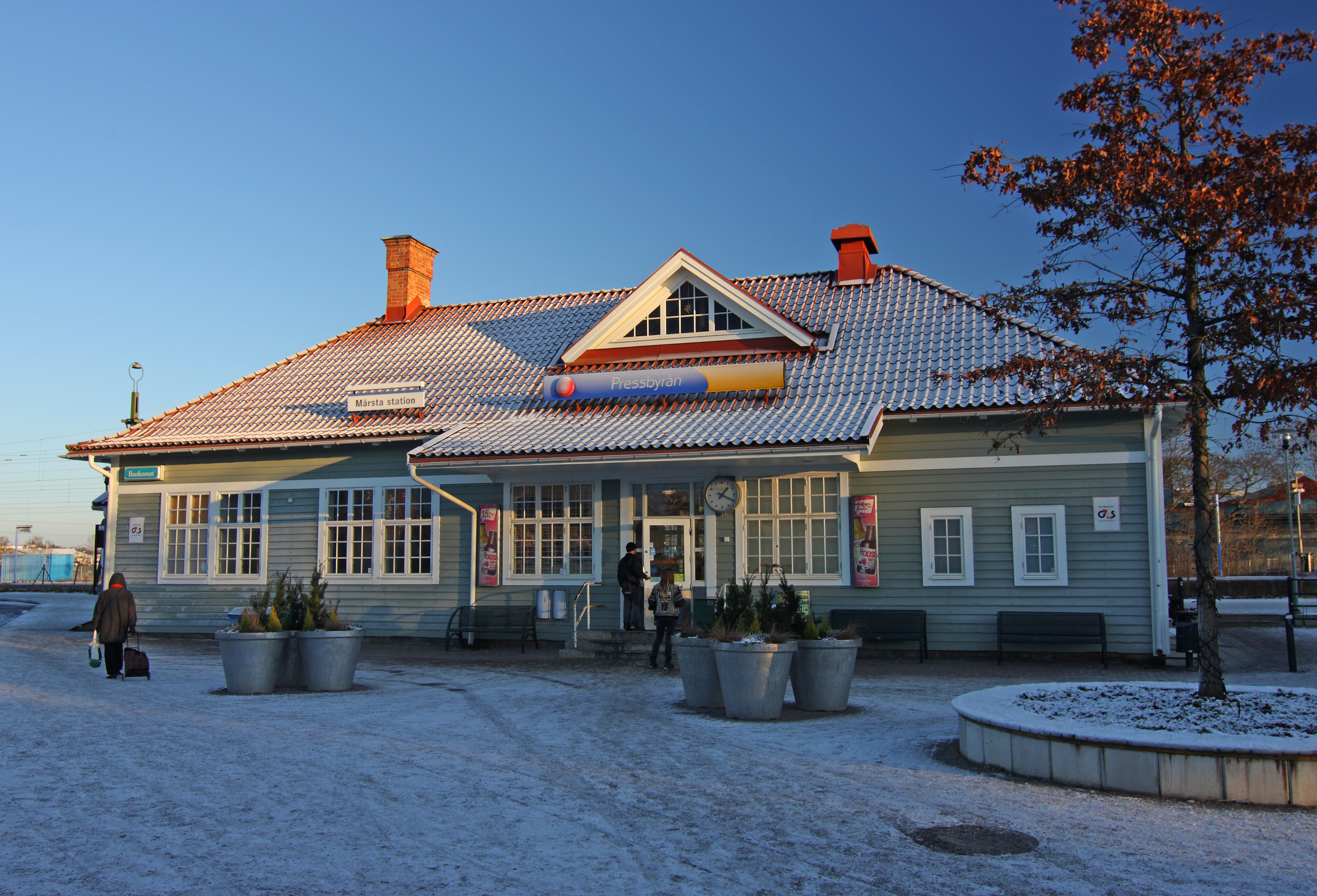
Märsta railway station.

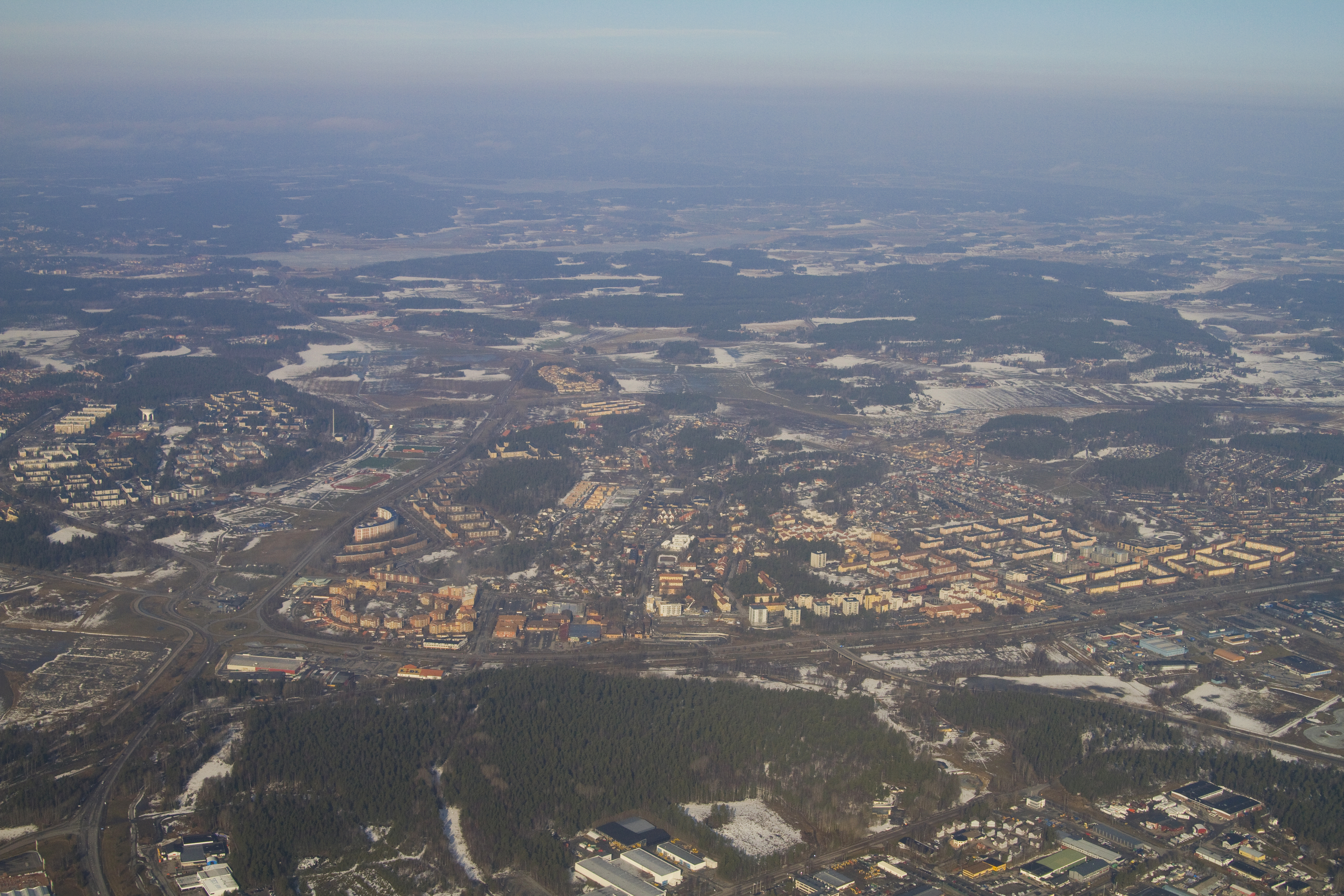
Märsta from east.

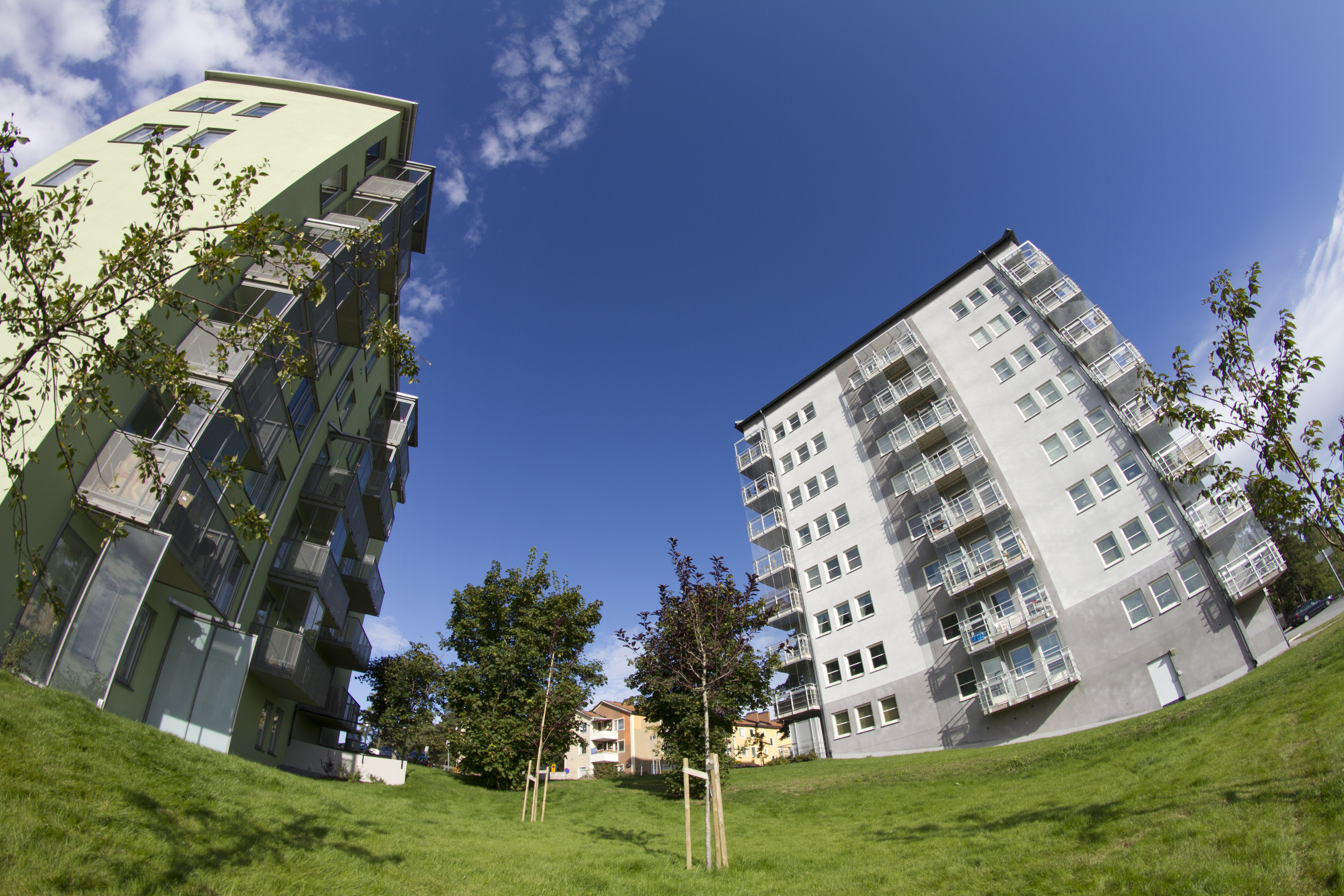
Residential area in the center of Märsta through a fish eye lens.

The church of Husby-Ärlinghundra. One of many churches in Märsta dating back to the early Medieval age.

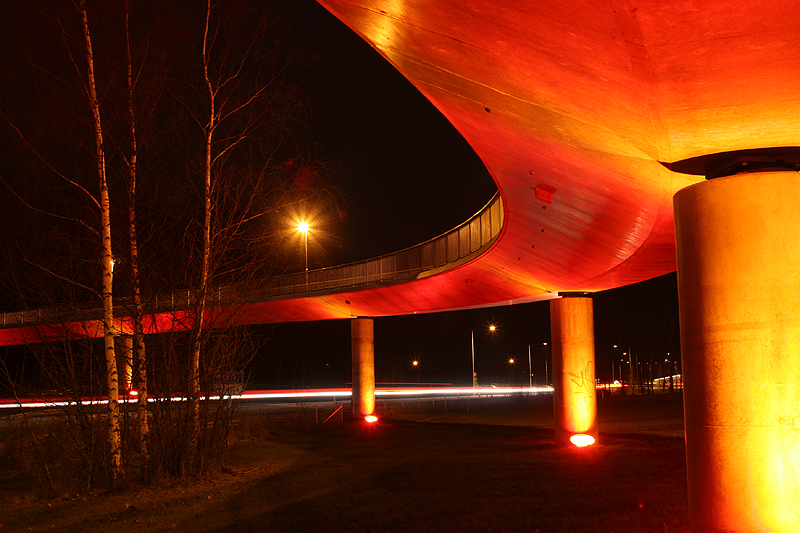
Ekillagård Pedestrian Bridge.

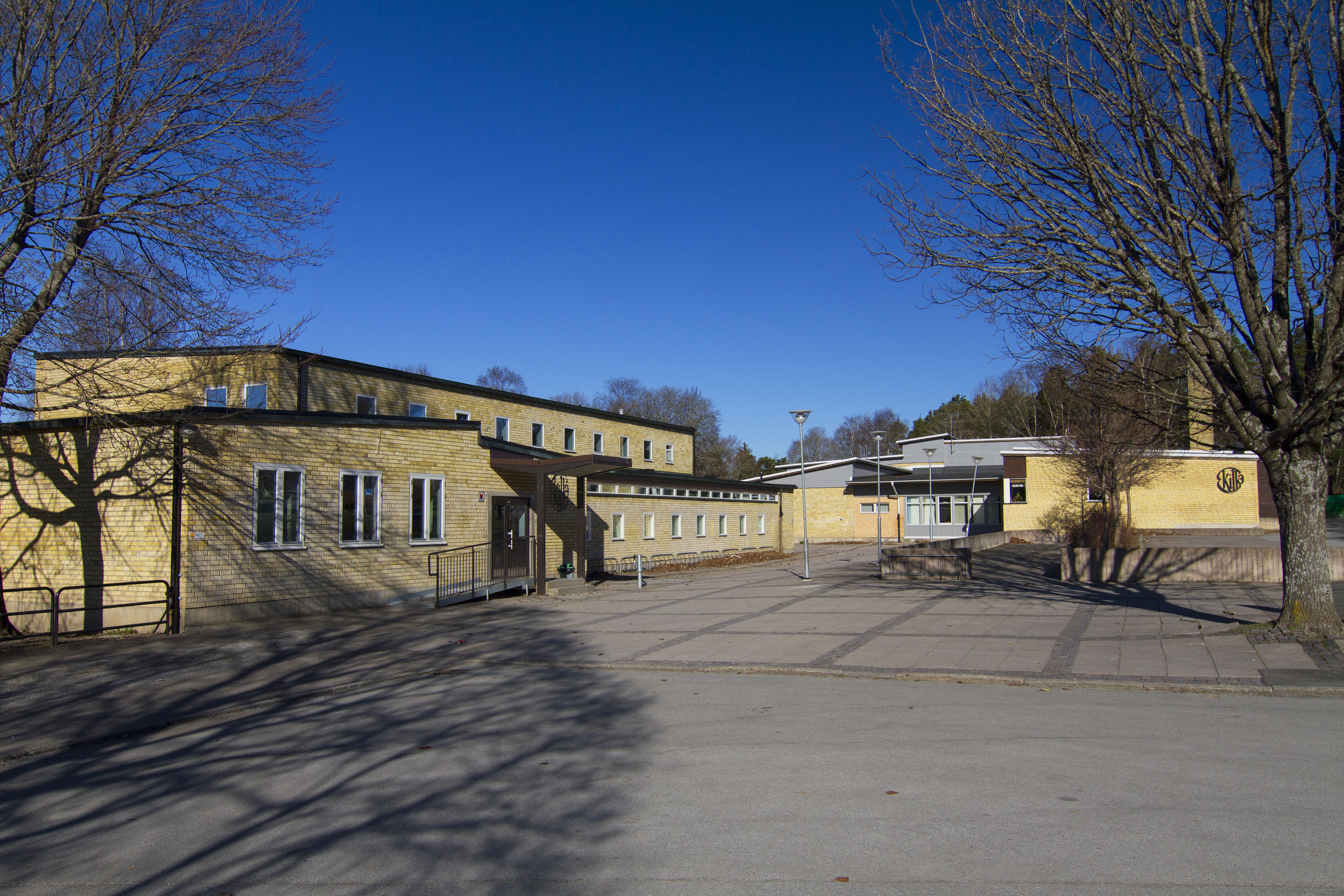
Ekillaskolan in Märsta.

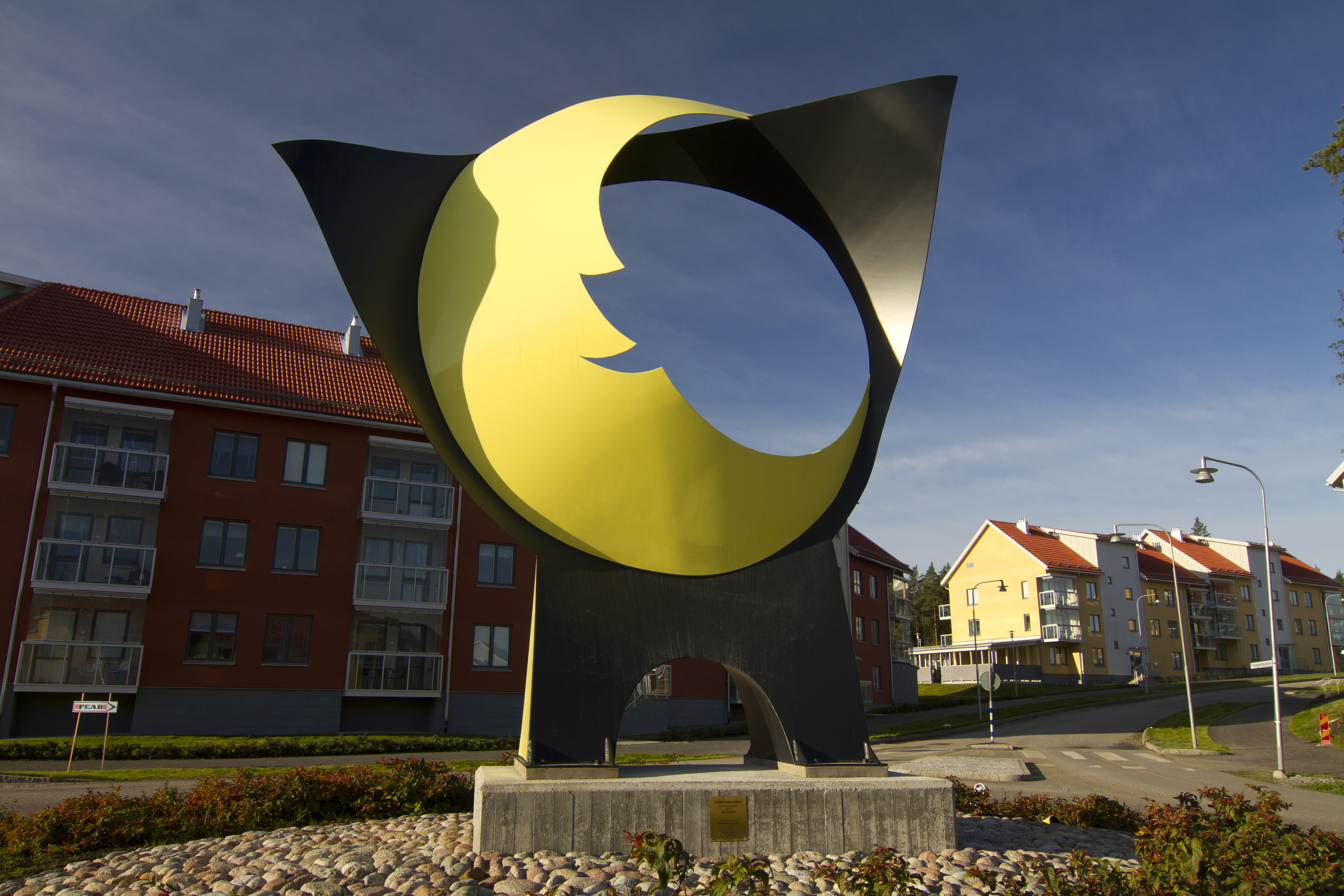
Sculpture in a roundabout at Steningehöjden.

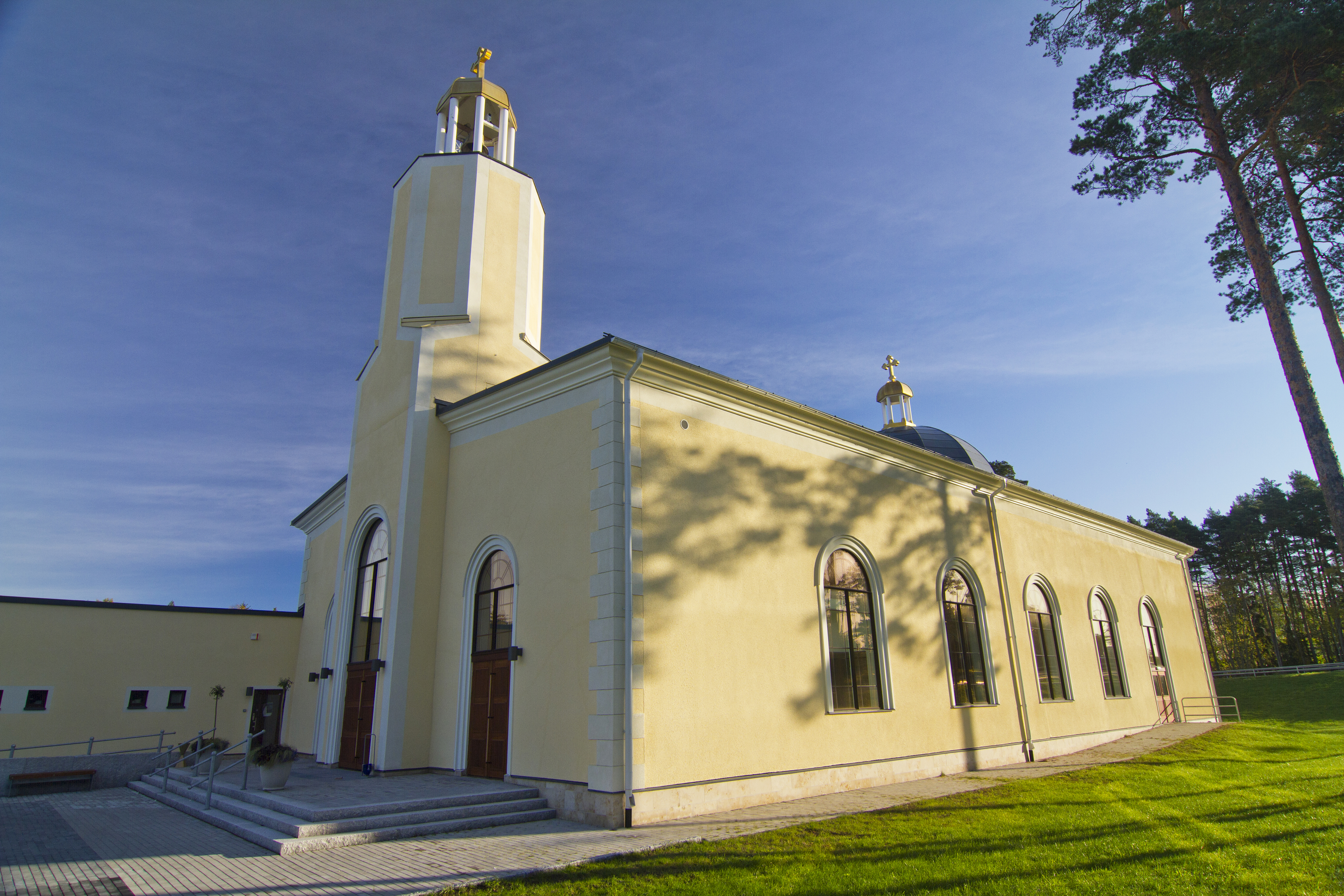
St Johannes Orthodox Church in Valsta, Märsta.

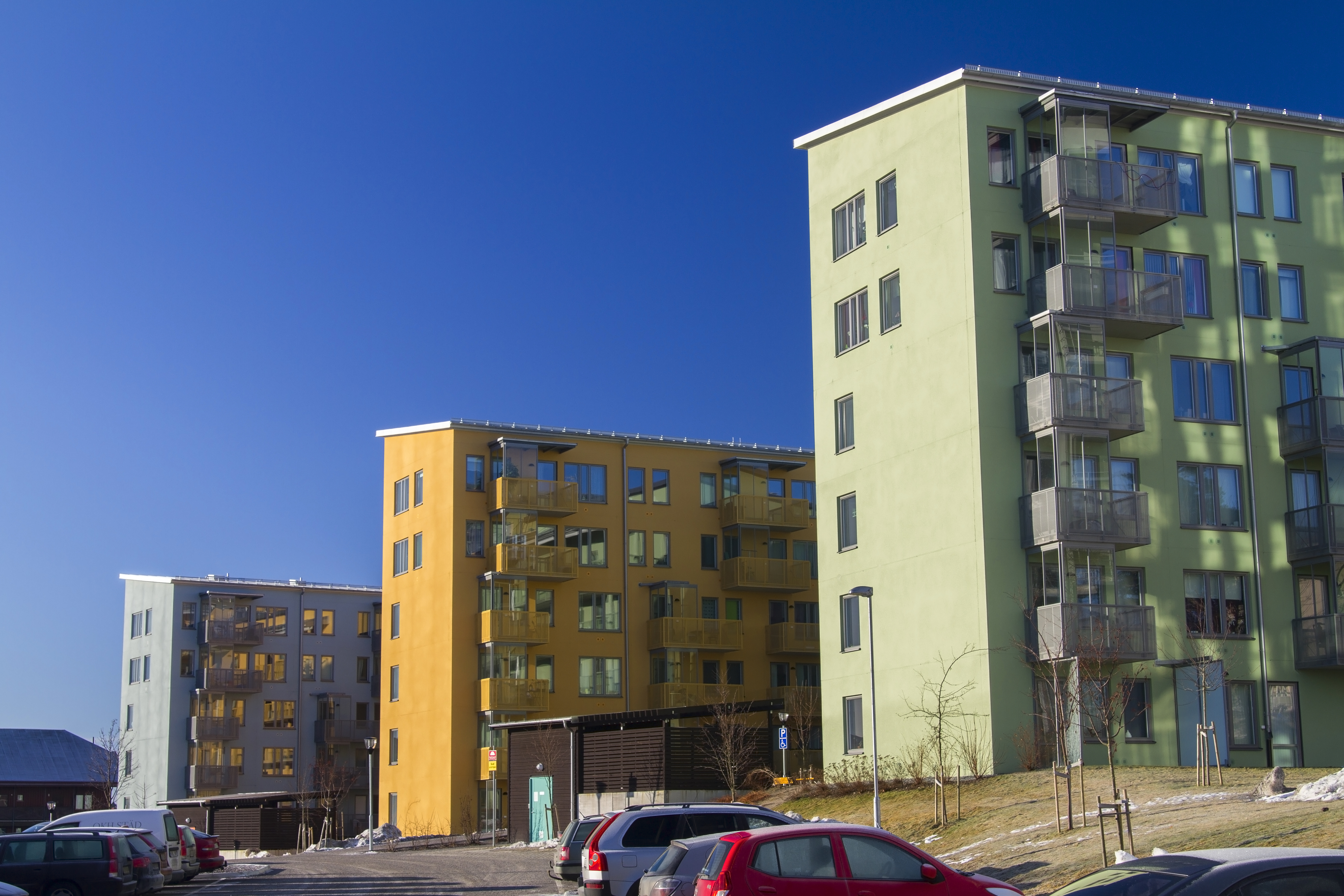
New residential area close to Märsta Centrum.

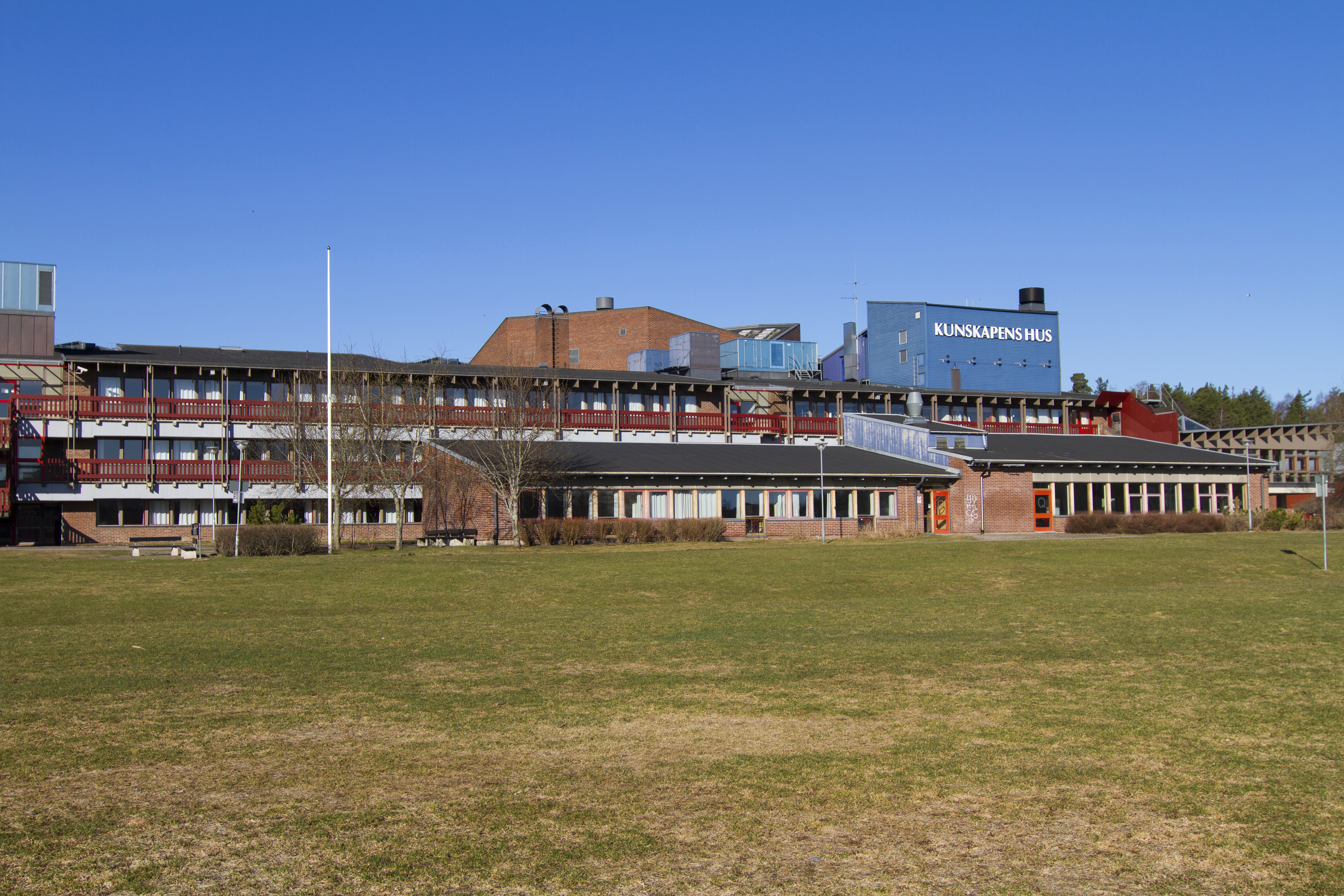
Arlandagymnasiet, a large Upper secondary school in Märsta

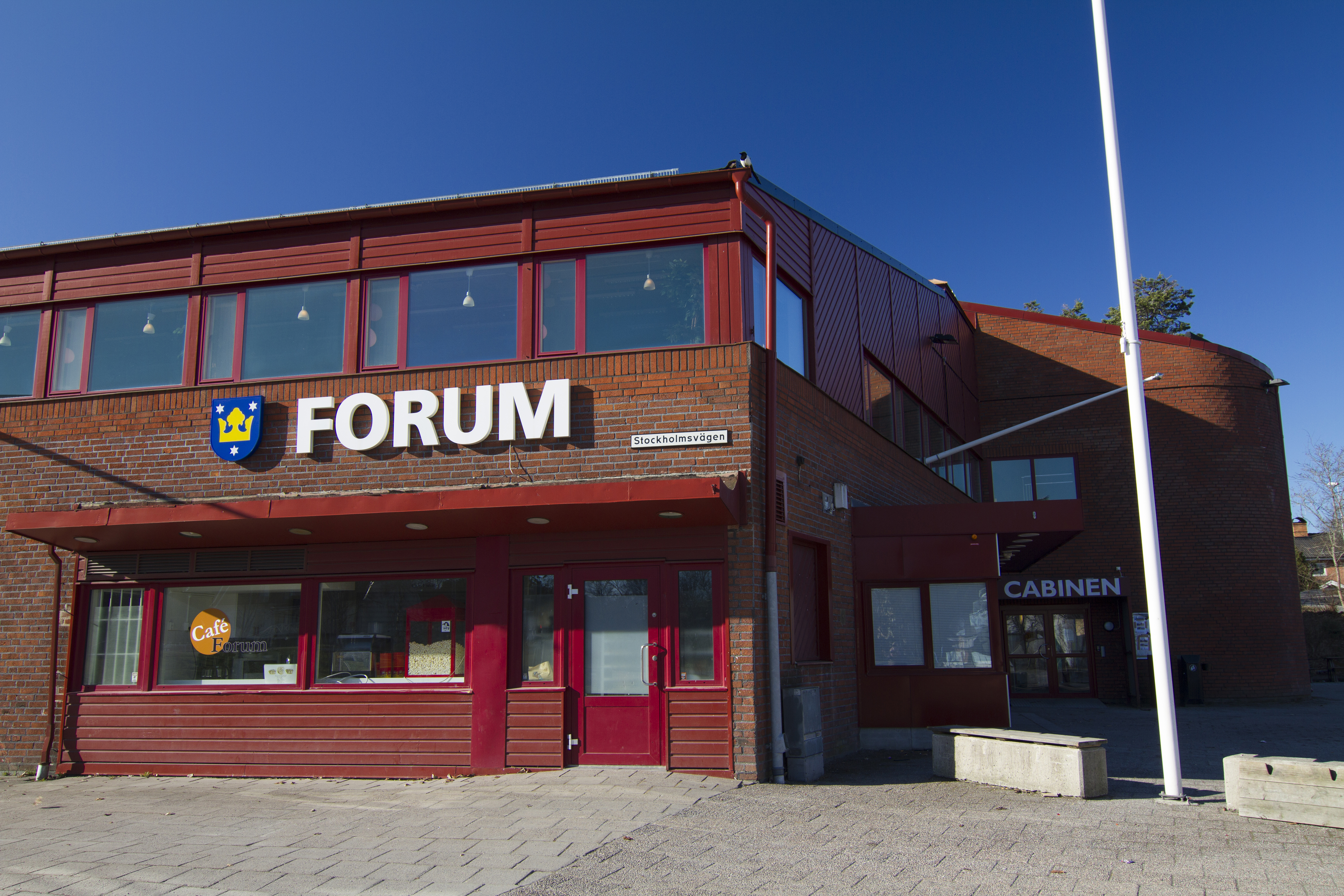
Forum in Märsta, Sweden. This is a local cinema and cultural meeting point run by the municipality

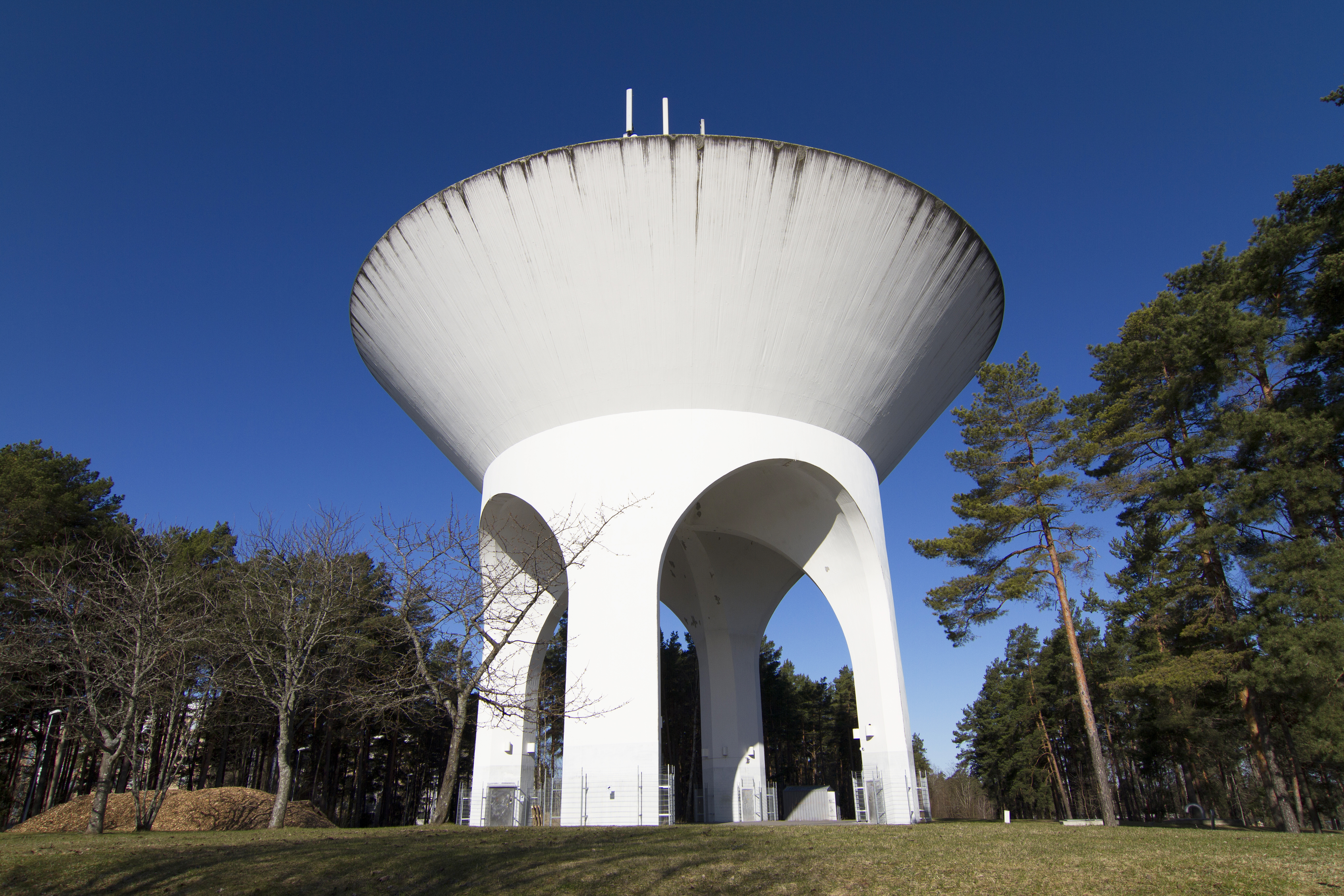
Valsta watertower in Märsta is a famous landmark

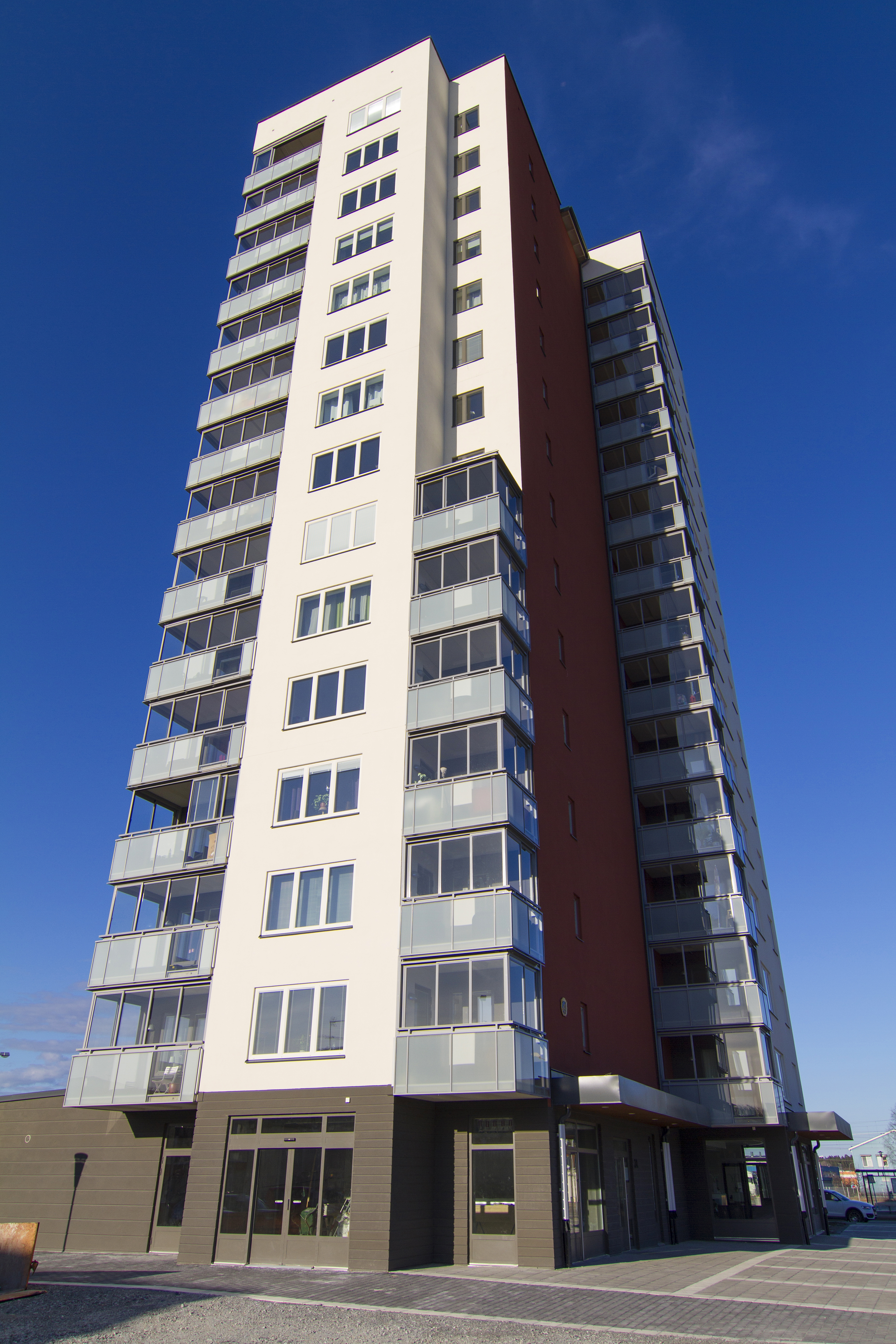
New high rise building in centre of Märsta

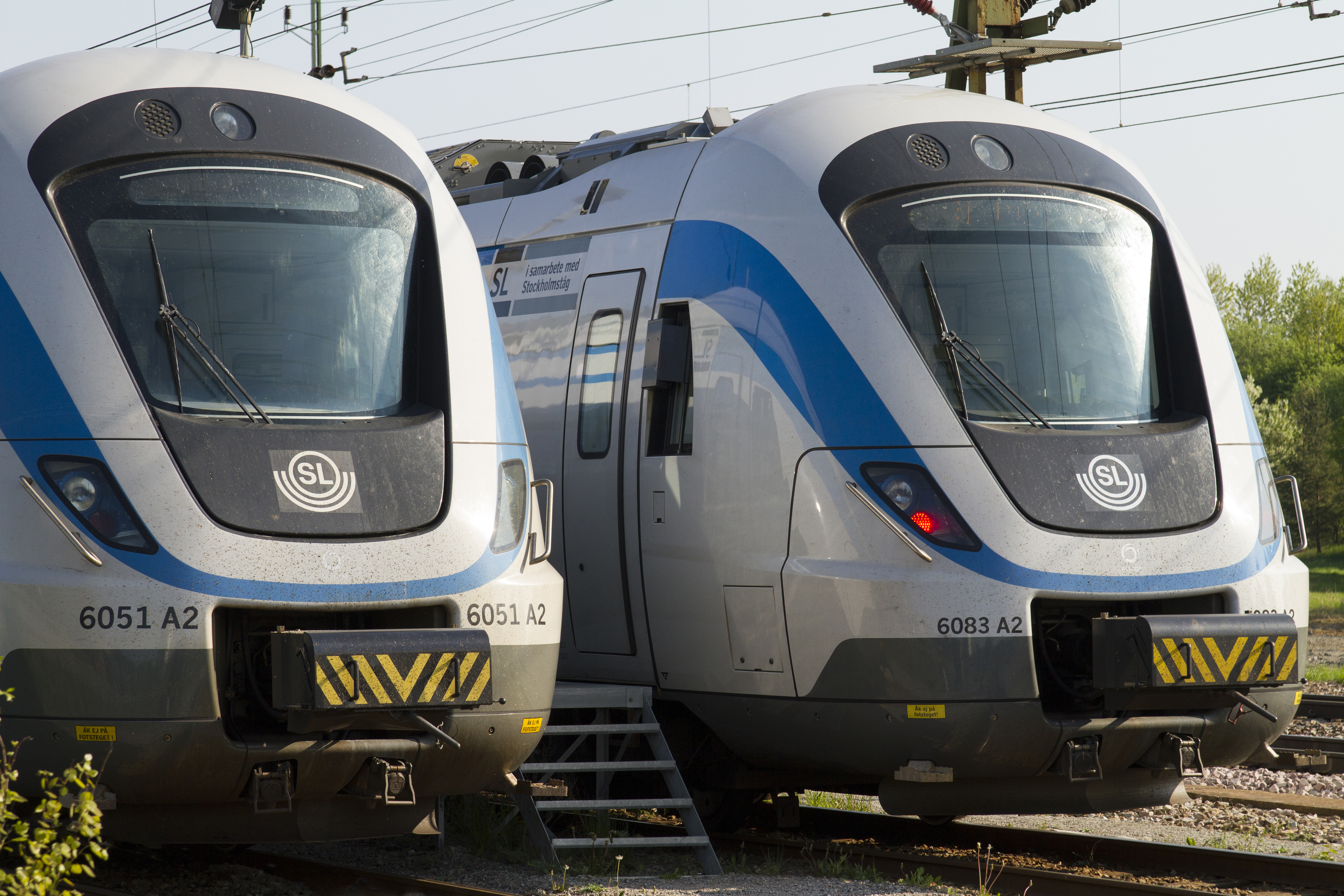
Commuter trains waiting for next assignment in Märsta

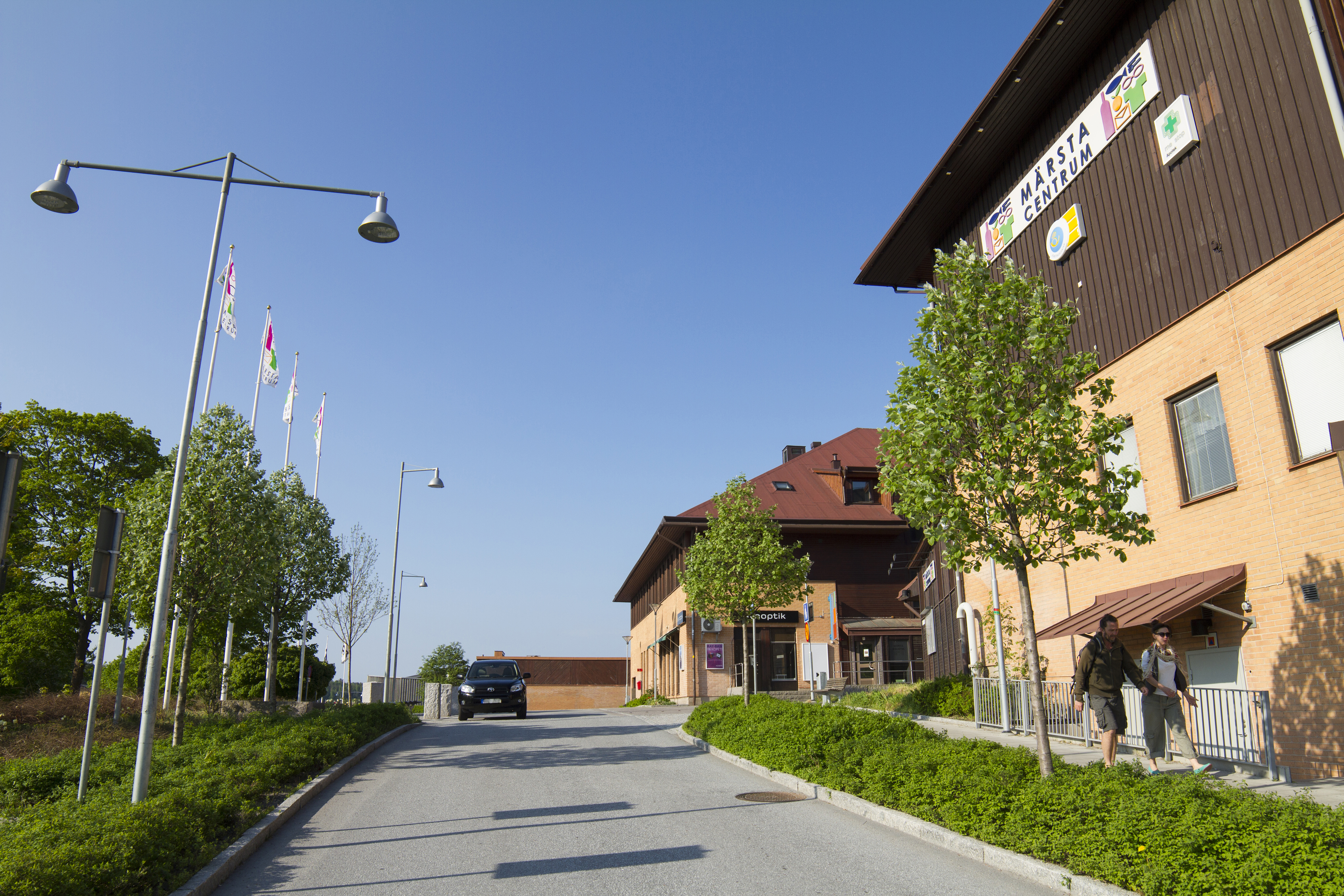
Entrance to Märsta Centrum shopping area

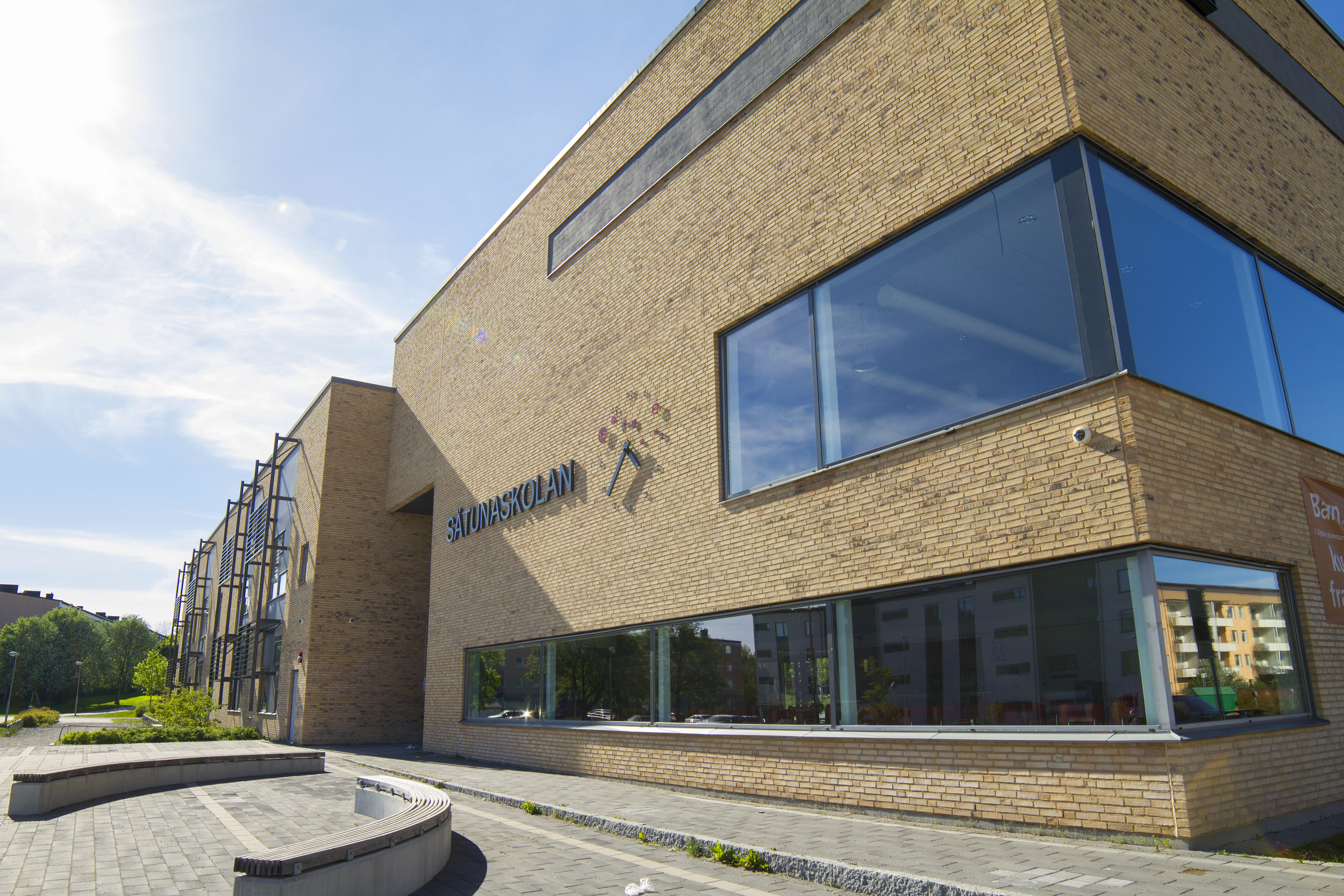
Saetuna Upper Primary school in Märsta

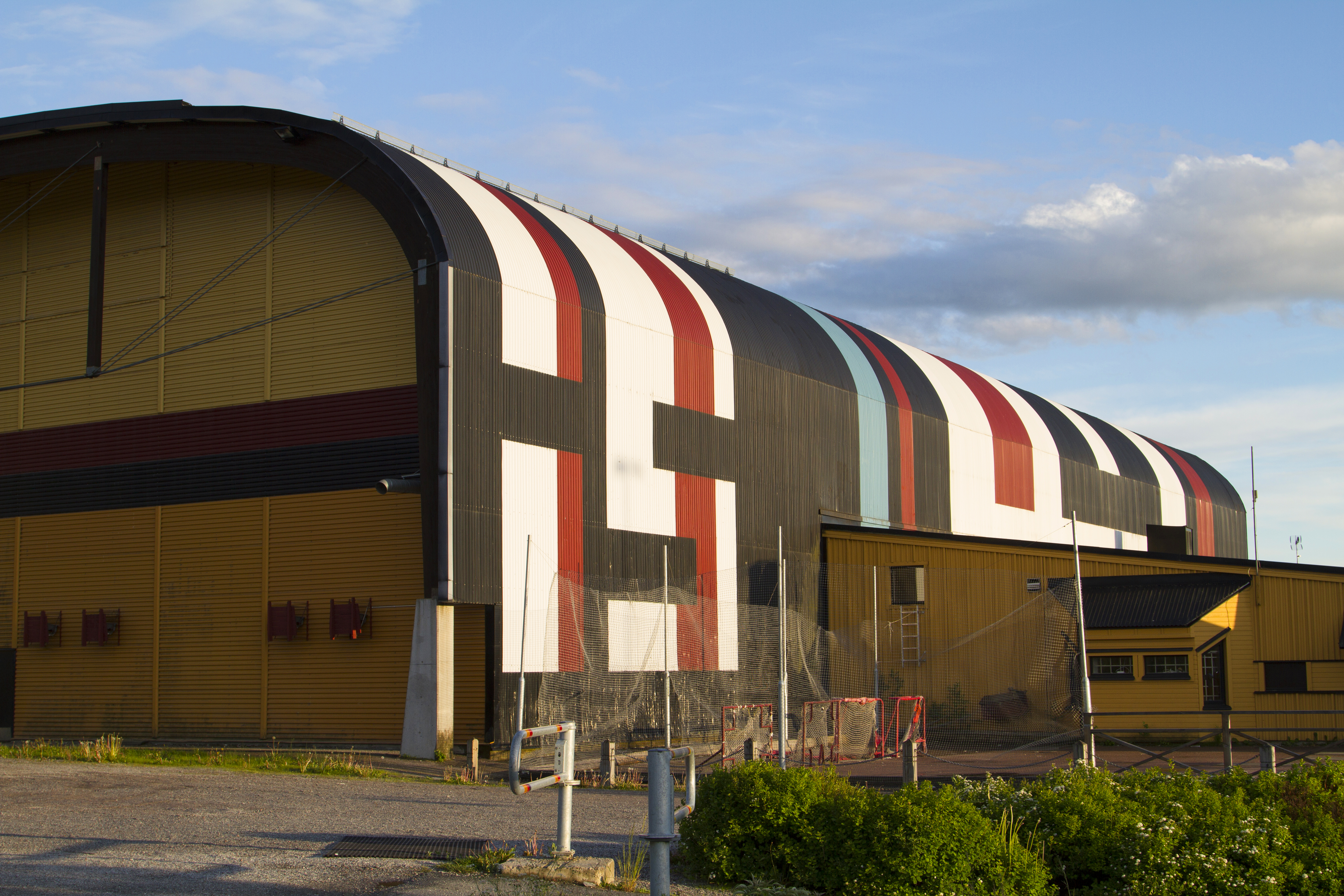
Pinbackshallen indoor icehockey rink in Märsta

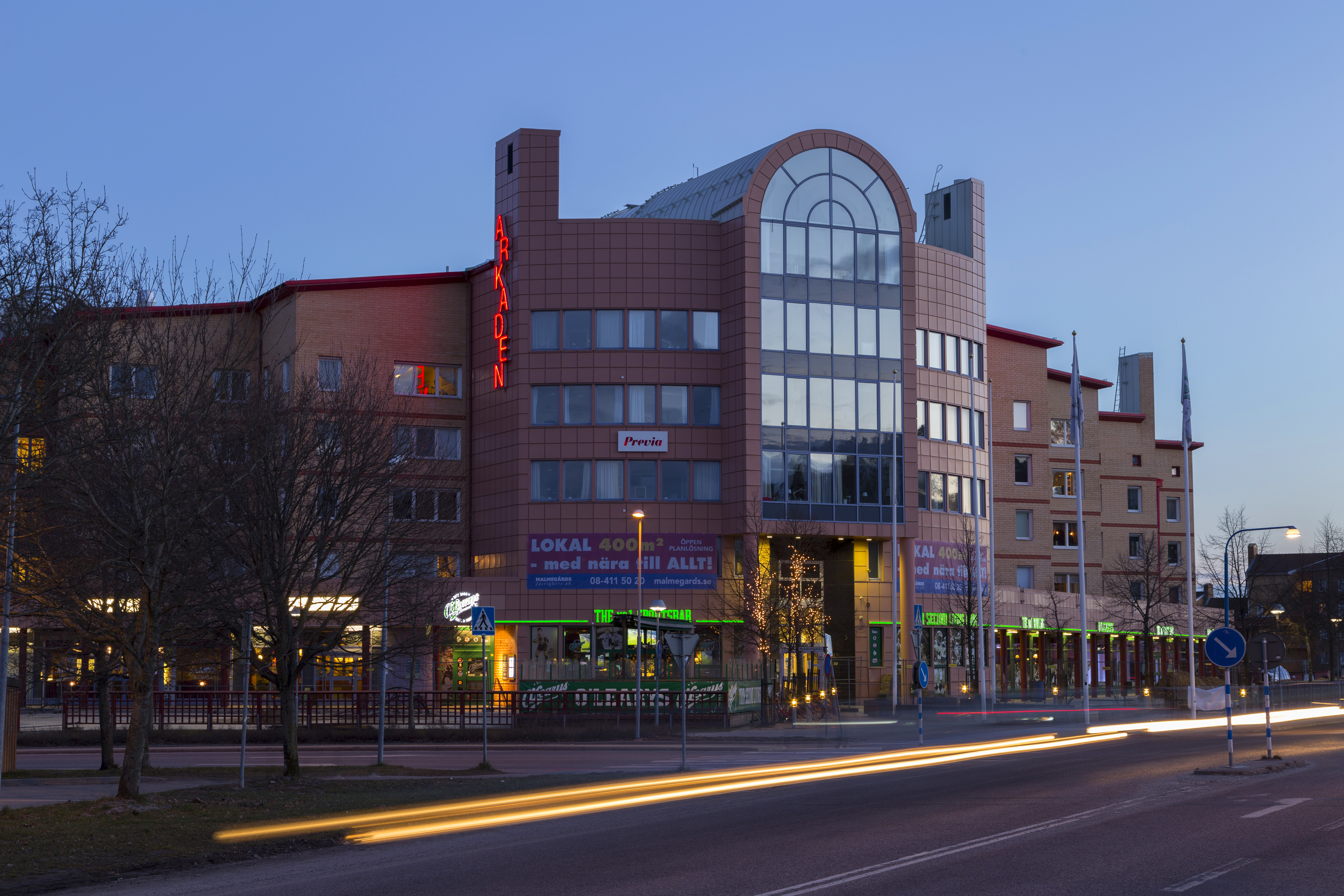
Arkaden close to Märsta Centrum
