= Assyriska Föreningen i Norrköping =

Swedish football club

- Full name: Assyriska Föreningen i Norrköping
- Founded: 1977
- Dissolved: 2021
- Ground: Mamre IP; Norrköping; Sweden
Home colours	Away colours

Assyriska Föreningen i Norrköping, abbreviated Assyriska IF, was a Swedish football club located in Norrköping.

They merged with IK Derik and Azech SF to form ADAS United in 2021.

== Background ==
Assyriska IF were founded in 1977 to serve the Assyrian community in Norrköping. Today there are players, officials and supporters of several different nationalities, not just the Assyrians.

Since their foundation, Assyriska IF has participated mainly in the middle and lower divisions of the Swedish football league system. The club currently plays in Division 2 Södra Svealand which is the fourth tier of Swedish football. They play their home matches at the Mamre IP in Norrköping.

Assyriska IF are affiliated to the Östergötlands Fotbollförbund.

== Season to season ==
Season	Level	Division	Section	Position	Movements
1999	Tier 5	Division 4	Östergötland Östra	10th	
2000	Tier 5	Division 4	Östergötland Östra	4th	
2001	Tier 5	Division 4	Östergötland Östra	8th	
2002	Tier 5	Division 4	Östergötland Östra	6th	
2003	Tier 5	Division 4	Östergötland Östra	2nd	Promotion Playoffs
2004	Tier 5	Division 4	Östergötland Östra	2nd	Promotion Playoffs
2005	Tier 5	Division 4	Östergötland Östra	2nd	Promotion Playoffs – Promoted
2006*	Tier 5	Division 3	Nordöstra Götaland	3rd	
2007	Tier 5	Division 3	Nordöstra Götaland	2nd	Promotion Playoffs
2008	Tier 5	Division 3	Nordöstra Götaland	2nd	Promotion Playoffs
2009	Tier 5	Division 3	Nordöstra Götaland	4th	
2010	Tier 5	Division 3	Nordöstra Götaland	1st	Promoted
2011	Tier 4	Division 2	Södra Svealand	8th	
2012	Tier 4	Division 2	Östra Götaland	9th	
2013	Tier 4	Division 2	Södra Svealand	12th	

* League restructuring in 2006 resulted in a new division being created at Tier 3 and subsequent divisions dropping a level.

== Attendances ==
In recent seasons Assyriska Föreningen i Norrköping have had the following average attendances:

Season	Average attendance	Division / Section	Level
2005	Not available	Div 4 Östergötland Östra	Tier 5
2006	82	Div 3 Nordöstra Götaland	Tier 5
2007	70	Div 3 Nordöstra Götaland	Tier 5
2008	98	Div 3 Nordöstra Götaland	Tier 5
2009	116	Div 3 Nordöstra Götaland	Tier 5
2010	144	Div 3 Nordöstra Götaland	Tier 5

* Attendances are provided in the Publikliga sections of the Svenska Fotbollförbundet website.

== See also ==
- List of Assyrian football teams in Sweden
