= 1999 FIFA World Youth Championship squads =

FIFA championship roster

The squads for the 1999 FIFA World Youth Championship tournament in Nigeria includes the names of all players.

Players marked in bold went on to earn full international caps.

== Group A ==
=== Costa Rica ===
Head coach: (Costa Rica) Carlos Watson

No.	Pos.	Player	Date of birth (age)	Caps	Club
1	GK	Jairo Villegas	16 February 1980 (aged 19)		(Costa Rica) Municipal Liberia
2	DF	Mauricio Garita	5 May 1979 (aged 19)		(Costa Rica) Herediano
3	MF	Pablo César Rodríguez	10 December 1979 (aged 19)		(Costa Rica) Guanacaste
4	DF	Alan Meléndez	19 July 1980 (aged 18)		(Costa Rica) Deportivo Saprissa
5	DF	**Alexander Castro**	14 February 1979 (aged 20)		(Costa Rica) Alajuelense
6	DF	**Gilberto Martínez**	1 October 1979 (aged 19)		(Costa Rica) Deportivo Saprissa
7	MF	**Mauricio Alpízar**	30 January 1979 (aged 20)		(Costa Rica) Ramonense
8	FW	Esteban Santana	6 April 1980 (aged 18)		(Costa Rica) Deportivo Saprissa
9	MF	José Ugarte	2 November 1980 (aged 18)		(Costa Rica) Herediano
10	MF	**Mínor Díaz**	26 December 1980 (aged 18)		(Costa Rica) Santa Barbara
11	MF	**Danny Fonseca**	7 November 1979 (aged 19)		(Costa Rica) Cartaginés
12	DF	Robert Arias	18 March 1980 (aged 19)		(Costa Rica) Herediano
13	DF	Alberto Brenes	18 March 1979 (aged 20)		(Costa Rica) Cartaginés
14	MF	Mario Víquez	4 May 1979 (aged 19)		(Costa Rica) Alajuelense
15	DF	**Juan Bautista Esquivel**	12 August 1980 (aged 18)		(Costa Rica) Deportivo Saprissa
16	FW	**Winston Parks**	12 October 1981 (aged 17)		(Costa Rica) Limón
17	MF	Luis Venegas	16 August 1980 (aged 18)		(Costa Rica) Plaza Acosta
18	GK	Greivin Cruz	13 January 1979 (aged 20)		(Costa Rica) Pérez Zeledón

=== Germany ===
Head coach: (Germany) Bernd Stöber

No.	Pos.	Player	Date of birth (age)	Caps	Club
1	GK	**Timo Hildebrand**	5 April 1979 (aged 19)		(Germany) VfB Stuttgart
2	DF	Alexander Rosen	10 April 1979 (aged 19)		(Germany) Eintracht Frankfurt
3	DF	Thorsten Schramm	19 February 1979 (aged 20)		(Germany) MSV Duisburg
4	DF	Marcel Rapp	16 April 1979 (aged 19)		(Germany) Karlsruher SC
5	DF	Thomas Lechner	9 January 1979 (aged 20)		(Germany) 1. FC Kaiserslautern
6	DF	Michael Stuckmann	1 September 1979 (aged 19)		(Germany) Wattenscheid 09
7	DF	Andreas Voss	27 February 1979 (aged 20)		(Germany) Bayer Leverkusen
8	MF	Michael Rothholz	25 August 1979 (aged 19)		(Germany) Borussia Dortmund
9	MF	Michael Mutzel	27 September 1979 (aged 19)		(Germany) Eintracht Frankfurt
10	MF	Patrick Falk	8 February 1980 (aged 19)		(Germany) Bayer Leverkusen
11	MF	Tobias Schäper	24 October 1979 (aged 19)		(Germany) Arminia Bielefeld
12	GK	Stefan Wessels	28 February 1979 (aged 20)		(Germany) Bayern Munich
13	DF	Sebastian Kaul	17 October 1979 (aged 19)		(Germany) KFC Uerdingen 05
14	MF	Martin Forkel	22 July 1979 (aged 19)		(Germany) Greuther Fürth
15	FW	Christian Timm	27 February 1979 (aged 20)		(Germany) Borussia Dortmund
16	FW	Enrico Kern	12 March 1979 (aged 20)		(Germany) Tennis Borussia Berlin
17	FW	Mahmut Yılmaz	6 October 1979 (aged 19)		(Germany) Hamburger SV
18	FW	Andreas Gensler	13 August 1979 (aged 19)		(Germany) Bayer Leverkusen

=== Nigeria ===
Head coaches: (Netherlands) Thijs Libregts & (Nigeria) Olatunde Nurudeen Disu

No.	Pos.	Player	Date of birth (age)	Caps	Club
1	GK	Sam Okoye	1 May 1980 (aged 18)		(Nigeria) Enugu Rangers
2	MF	**Samuel Okunowo**	1 March 1979 (aged 20)		(Spain) Barcelona
3	DF	Ikenna Eneh	15 February 1980 (aged 19)		(Nigeria) Enugu Rangers
4	DF	Obinna Okpala	15 July 1979 (aged 19)		(Scotland) Celtic
5	DF	John Aranka	23 December 1980 (aged 18)		(Nigeria) Eagle Cement
6	DF	Ozuah Ikemefuna	24 December 1981 (aged 17)		(Nigeria) Jasper United
7	FW	**Haruna Babangida**	1 October 1982 (aged 16)		(Spain) Barcelona
8	FW	Hashimu Garba	14 April 1980 (aged 18)		(Italy) Verona
9	MF	Gabriel Melkam	13 March 1980 (aged 19)		(Germany) Wattenscheid 09
10	MF	Abubakar Musa	17 January 1979 (aged 20)		(Nigeria) Eagle Cement
11	FW	Ganiyu Shittu	22 December 1979 (aged 19)		(Germany) Fortuna Düsseldorf
12	GK	Dominic Oruma	17 July 1980 (aged 18)		(Nigeria) Sharks
13	MF	**Pius Ikedia**	11 July 1980 (aged 18)		(Ivory Coast) ASEC Mimosas
14	DF	**Joseph Yobo**	6 September 1980 (aged 18)		(Belgium) Standard Liège
15	DF	**Rabiu Afolabi**	18 April 1980 (aged 18)		(Belgium) Standard Liège
16	DF	**Chikelue Iloenyosi**	13 October 1980 (aged 18)		(Turkey) Fenerbahçe
17	FW	**Julius Aghahowa**	12 February 1982 (aged 17)		(Nigeria) Bendel Insurance
18	FW	Eddy Dombraye	11 November 1979 (aged 19)		(Poland) ŁKS Łódź

=== Paraguay ===
Head coach: (Paraguay) Mario Jacquet

No.	Pos.	Player	Date of birth (age)	Caps	Club
1	GK	Christian Florentín	2 May 1979 (aged 19)		(Paraguay) Club Cerro Corá
2	DF	**Emilio Martínez**	10 April 1981 (aged 17)		(Paraguay) Nacional
3	DF	Roberto Blanco	17 April 1980 (aged 18)		(Paraguay) Sportivo Luqueño
4	DF	**Paulo da Silva**	1 February 1980 (aged 19)		(Italy) Perugia
5	DF	**Rubén Maldonado**	25 April 1979 (aged 19)		(Paraguay) Olimpia Asunción
6	MF	Ever Giménez	20 April 1979 (aged 19)		(Paraguay) Sportivo San Lorenzo
7	FW	Sergio Fernández	31 July 1979 (aged 19)		(Paraguay) Club Cerro Corá
8	MF	Isidro Candia	15 May 1979 (aged 19)		(Paraguay) Sportivo Luqueño
9	FW	**Roque Santa Cruz**	16 August 1981 (aged 17)		(Paraguay) Olimpia Asunción
10	MF	Francisco Escobar	3 December 1979 (aged 19)		(Paraguay) Sportivo Luqueño
11	FW	**Nelson Cuevas**	10 January 1980 (aged 19)		(Argentina) River Plate
12	GK	Roberto Bagnoli	16 February 1980 (aged 19)		(Paraguay) Sportivo Iteño
13	FW	Nelson Vera	7 October 1979 (aged 19)		(Paraguay) Nacional
14	DF	**Elvis Marecos**	15 February 1980 (aged 19)		(Paraguay) Sportivo Iteño
15	FW	**Salvador Cabañas**	5 August 1980 (aged 18)		(Paraguay) Club 12 de Octubre
16	MF	**Jorge Brítez**	8 February 1981 (aged 18)		(Paraguay) Presidente Hayes
17	DF	**Walter Fretes**	18 May 1982 (aged 16)		(Paraguay) Olimpia Asunción
18	FW	Miguel Domínguez	30 September 1979 (aged 19)		(Paraguay) Club Atlético Tembetary

== Group B ==
=== Argentina ===
Head coach: (Argentina) José Pekerman

No.	Pos.	Player	Date of birth (age)	Caps	Club
1	GK	**Franco Costanzo**	5 September 1980 (aged 18)		(Argentina) River Plate
2	DF	Carlos Roldán	12 September 1979 (aged 19)		(Argentina) Lanús
3	DF	**Gabriel Milito**	7 September 1980 (aged 18)		(Argentina) Independiente
4	DF	**Juan Fernández**	3 May 1980 (aged 18)		(Argentina) Estudiantes La Plata
5	MF	**Esteban Cambiasso**	18 August 1980 (aged 18)		(Argentina) Independiente
6	DF	Fernando Crosa	28 February 1979 (aged 20)		(Argentina) Newell's Old Boys
7	FW	**Luciano Galletti**	9 April 1980 (aged 18)		(Argentina) Estudiantes La Plata
8	MF	**Aldo Duscher**	22 March 1979 (aged 20)		(Portugal) Sporting CP
9	FW	Sixto Peralta	16 April 1979 (aged 19)		(Argentina) Huracán
10	FW	**Daniel Montenegro**	28 March 1979 (aged 20)		(Argentina) Huracán
13	DF	Germán Rivarola	18 April 1979 (aged 19)		(Argentina) Rosario Central
12	GK	**Sebastián Saja**	5 June 1979 (aged 19)		(Argentina) San Lorenzo
11	MF	Javier Villarreal	1 March 1979 (aged 20)		(Argentina) Talleres de Córdoba
14	DF	Cristian Grabinski	12 January 1980 (aged 19)		(Argentina) Newell's Old Boys
15	MF	Luis Zubeldía	13 January 1981 (aged 18)		(Argentina) Lanús
16	FW	**Ernesto Farías**	29 May 1980 (aged 18)		(Argentina) Estudiantes La Plata
17	FW	Sebastián Flores Coronel	11 April 1979 (aged 19)		(Argentina) Rosario Central
18	FW	**Federico Insúa**	3 January 1980 (aged 19)		(Argentina) Argentinos Juniors

=== Croatia ===
Head coach: (Croatia) Martin Novoselac

No.	Pos.	Player	Date of birth (age)	Caps	Club
1	GK	**Stipe Pletikosa**	8 January 1979 (aged 20)		(Croatia) Hajduk Split
2	DF	**Darko Miladin**	1 April 1979 (aged 20)		(Croatia) Hajduk Split
3	DF	Kristijan Polovanec	10 October 1979 (aged 19)		Croatia Zagreb
4	DF	**Goran Sablić**	4 August 1979 (aged 19)		(Croatia) Hajduk Split
5	DF	Andre Mijatović	3 December 1979 (aged 19)		(Croatia) Rijeka
6	MF	**Anthony Šerić**	15 January 1979 (aged 20)		(Croatia) Hajduk Split
7	FW	Mihael Mikić	6 January 1980 (aged 19)		Croatia Zagreb
8	MF	**Jurica Vranješ**	31 January 1980 (aged 19)		(Croatia) Osijek
9	FW	**Igor Budan**	22 April 1980 (aged 18)		(Croatia) Rijeka
10	MF	**Josip Balatinac**	7 March 1979 (aged 20)		(Croatia) Osijek
11	FW	Zvonimir Deranja	22 September 1979 (aged 19)		(Croatia) Hajduk Split
12	GK	Hrvoje Sunara	4 May 1979 (aged 19)		(Croatia) Hajduk Split
13	DF	**Silvester Sabolčki**	12 November 1979 (aged 19)		(Croatia) Varteks
14	MF	**Srđan Andrić**	5 January 1980 (aged 19)		(Croatia) Hajduk Split
15	MF	**Ivica Banović**	2 August 1980 (aged 18)		(Croatia) NK Zagreb
16	FW	**Saša Bjelanović**	11 June 1979 (aged 19)		(Croatia) Zadarkomerc
17	DF	Hrvoje Vuković	25 July 1979 (aged 19)		(Croatia) Varteks
18	FW	Krunoslav Lovrek	11 September 1979 (aged 19)		(Croatia) Zagreb

=== Ghana ===
Head coach: (Italy) Giuseppe Dossena

No.	Pos.	Player	Date of birth (age)	Caps	Club
1	GK	**Sammy Adjei**	1 September 1980 (aged 18)		(Ghana) Hearts of Oak
2	DF	Karim Abdul	5 February 1980 (aged 19)		(Norway) Kongsvinger
3	FW	**Baffour Gyan**	2 July 1980 (aged 18)		(Greece) Kalamata
4	DF	Kofi Amoako	26 March 1979 (aged 20)		(Ghana) Goldfields
5	DF	Abdul Rahman Issah	4 November 1980 (aged 18)		(Italy) Udinese
6	MF	Abdul Razak	2 October 1980 (aged 18)		(Ghana) Ebusua Dwarfs
7	FW	Mohammed Abdulai	4 December 1980 (aged 18)		(Germany) Borussia Dortmund
8	DF	**Hamza Mohammed**	5 November 1980 (aged 18)		(Ghana) Real Tamale United
9	MF	Theophilus Amuzu	22 November 1980 (aged 18)		(Belgium) Standard Liège
10	MF	**Stephen Appiah**	24 December 1980 (aged 18)		(Italy) Udinese
11	DF	**Aziz Ansah**	7 October 1980 (aged 18)		(Belgium) Harelbeke
12	MF	**Laryea Kingston**	7 November 1980 (aged 18)		(Ghana) Great Olympics
13	FW	Johnson Eku	17 September 1980 (aged 18)		(Ghana) Electricity
14	FW	**Skelley Adu Tutu**	10 August 1979 (aged 19)		(Belgium) Union Saint-Gilloise
15	DF	**George Blay**	7 August 1980 (aged 18)		(Belgium) Standard Liège
16	GK	**Osei Boateng**	19 May 1981 (aged 17)		(Ghana) Great Olympics
17	FW	**Peter Ofori-Quaye**	21 March 1980 (aged 19)		(Greece) Olympiacos
18	FW	Owusu Afriyie	1 September 1980 (aged 18)		(Spain) Málaga

=== Kazakhstan ===
Head coach: (Kazakhstan) Vladimir Fomichyov

No.	Pos.	Player	Date of birth (age)	Caps	Club
1	GK	**David Loriya**	31 October 1981 (aged 17)		(Kazakhstan) Astana
2	MF	Denis Proskurin	3 April 1979 (aged 20)		(Kazakhstan) Semey
3	DF	**Igor Soloshenko**	22 May 1979 (aged 19)		(Kazakhstan) Shakhter
4	DF	**Aleksandr Kuchma**	9 December 1980 (aged 18)		(Kazakhstan) Taraz
5	FW	Sergey Gorbanev	27 November 1979 (aged 19)		(Kazakhstan) Taraz
6	MF	**Ali Aliyev**	27 October 1980 (aged 18)		(Kazakhstan) Kairat Almaty
7	DF	**Maksim Samchenko**	5 May 1979 (aged 19)		(Kazakhstan) Vostok
8	FW	Andrey Issayev	3 May 1980 (aged 18)		(Kazakhstan) Kairat Almaty
9	MF	**Andrey Travin**	27 April 1979 (aged 19)		(Kazakhstan) Kairat Almaty
10	FW	Alikhan Akkazynov	23 October 1979 (aged 19)		(Kazakhstan) Kairat Almaty
11	FW	Yevgeniy Tarassov	25 March 1979 (aged 20)		(Kazakhstan) Kairat Almaty
12	FW	Yerlan Urazayev	4 April 1979 (aged 19)		(Kazakhstan) Kairat Almaty
13	DF	**Aidar Kumisbekov**	9 February 1979 (aged 20)		(Kazakhstan) Kairat Almaty
14	DF	Dmitriy Kichshenko	29 March 1979 (aged 20)		(Kazakhstan) Aktobe
15	FW	Murat Dinayev	8 January 1980 (aged 19)		(Kazakhstan) Zhiger Shymkent
16	MF	Vitaliy Artemov	16 February 1979 (aged 20)		(Kazakhstan) Kairat Almaty
17	MF	Konstantin Zemtsov	24 July 1980 (aged 18)		(Kazakhstan) Kairat Almaty
18	GK	Denis Solovarenko	4 April 1979 (aged 19)		(Kazakhstan) Kairat Almaty

== Group C ==
=== Australia ===
Head coach: (Australia) Les Scheinflug

No.	Pos.	Player	Date of birth (age)	Caps	Club
1	GK	Anthony Breaden	7 March 1979 (aged 20)		(Australia) Adelaide City
2	DF	**Brett Emerton**	22 February 1979 (aged 20)		(Australia) Sydney Olympic
3	DF	**Lindsay Wilson**	4 May 1979 (aged 19)		(Australia) Canberra Cosmos
4	MF	**Simon Colosimo**	8 January 1979 (aged 20)		(Australia) Carlton
5	DF	Eddy Bosnar	29 April 1980 (aged 18)		(Australia) Northern Spirit
6	DF	Paul Wearne	14 March 1980 (aged 19)		(Australia) Northern Spirit
7	MF	**Jason Culina**	5 August 1980 (aged 18)		(Australia) Sydney Olympic
8	MF	**Vince Grella**	5 October 1979 (aged 19)		(Italy) Empoli
9	FW	**Mark Bresciano**	11 February 1980 (aged 19)		(Australia) Carlton
10	FW	John Maisano	6 January 1979 (aged 20)		(Belgium) Westerlo
11	MF	**Mile Sterjovski**	27 May 1979 (aged 19)		(Australia) Sydney United
12	MF	David Terminello	30 August 1980 (aged 18)		(Australia) Adelaide City
13	MF	Michael Cunico	17 March 1979 (aged 20)		(Australia) Northern Spirit
14	FW	Danny Invincibile	31 March 1979 (aged 20)		(Australia) Marconi Stallions
15	DF	Christian Care	21 March 1979 (aged 20)		(Australia) Marconi Stallions
16	MF	**Joel Griffiths**	21 August 1979 (aged 19)		(Australia) Sydney United
17	DF	Mark Byrnes	8 February 1982 (aged 17)		(Australia) NSW Institute of Sport
18	GK	Michael Turnbull	24 March 1981 (aged 18)		(Australia) Australian Institute of Sport

=== Mexico ===
Head coach: (Mexico) Jesús del Muro

No.	Pos.	Player	Date of birth (age)	Caps	Club
1	GK	Christian Martínez	16 October 1979 (aged 19)		(Mexico) Cuautitlán
2	DF	Mario Méndez	1 June 1979 (aged 19)		(Mexico) Atlas
3	DF	Óscar Mascorro	11 February 1980 (aged 19)		(Mexico) Toros Neza
4	DF	**Rafael Márquez**	13 February 1979 (aged 20)		(Mexico) Atlas
5	MF	Carlos Adrián Morales	6 September 1979 (aged 19)		(Mexico) Monarcas Morelia
6	MF	**Gerardo Torrado**	30 April 1979 (aged 19)		(Mexico) UNAM Pumas
7	FW	José Alejandro Nava	20 September 1979 (aged 19)		(Mexico) Chivas Tijuana
8	MF	Cesáreo Victorino	19 March 1979 (aged 20)		(Mexico) Pachuca
9	FW	Jesús Mendoza	10 January 1979 (aged 20)		(Mexico) Club León
10	MF	Juan Pablo Rodríguez	7 August 1979 (aged 19)		(Mexico) Atlas
11	FW	Daniel Osorno	16 March 1979 (aged 20)		(Mexico) Atlas
12	GK	Juan de Dios Ibarra	14 February 1979 (aged 20)		(Mexico) Saltillo
13	MF	Luis Ignacio González	28 June 1980 (aged 18)		(Mexico) UNAM Pumas
14	MF	Eduardo Rodríguez	13 September 1979 (aged 19)		(Mexico) U.A.T.
15	MF	Jonathan Martínez	21 February 1979 (aged 20)		(Mexico) América
16	DF	Rodolfo Pacheco	7 May 1979 (aged 19)		(Mexico) UNAM Pumas
17	DF	Margarito González	3 March 1979 (aged 20)		(Mexico) Tapatio
18	DF	**Héctor Reynoso**	3 October 1980 (aged 18)		(Mexico) Guadalajara

=== Republic of Ireland ===
Head coach: (Republic of Ireland) Brian Kerr

No.	Pos.	Player	Date of birth (age)	Caps	Club
1	GK	Alex O'Reilly	5 September 1979 (aged 19)		(England) West Ham United
2	DF	Thomas Heary	14 February 1979 (aged 20)		(England) Huddersfield Town
3	DF	Keith Doyle	20 July 1979 (aged 19)		(Republic of Ireland) St. Patrick's Athletic
4	DF	Jason Gavin	14 March 1980 (aged 19)		(England) Middlesbrough
5	DF	**Gary Doherty**	31 January 1980 (aged 19)		(England) Luton Town
6	MF	**Barry Quinn**	9 May 1979 (aged 19)		(England) Coventry City
7	MF	**Stephen McPhail**	9 December 1979 (aged 19)		(England) Leeds United
8	MF	Gerry Crossley	5 February 1980 (aged 19)		(Scotland) Celtic
9	FW	Liam George	2 February 1979 (aged 20)		(England) Luton Town
10	FW	**Robbie Keane**	8 July 1980 (aged 18)		(England) Wolverhampton Wanderers
11	MF	**Damien Duff**	2 March 1979 (aged 20)		(England) Blackburn Rovers
12	MF	Richie Baker	17 April 1980 (aged 18)		(Republic of Ireland) Shelbourne
13	MF	**Colin Healy**	14 March 1980 (aged 19)		(Scotland) Celtic
14	FW	**Richard Sadlier**	14 January 1979 (aged 20)		(England) Millwall
15	MF	Ryan Casey	3 January 1979 (aged 20)		(Wales) Swansea City
16	GK	Dean Delany	15 September 1980 (aged 18)		(England) Everton
17	DF	Paul Donnelly	31 August 1979 (aged 19)		(England) Leeds United
18	DF	Barry Ferguson	7 September 1979 (aged 19)		(England) Coventry City

=== Saudi Arabia ===
Head coach: (Netherlands) Pieter Hamberg

No.	Pos.	Player	Date of birth (age)	Caps	Club
1	GK	**Mabrouk Zaid**	11 February 1979 (aged 20)		(Saudi Arabia) Al-Riyadh
2	DF	**Fouzi Al-Shehri**	15 May 1980 (aged 18)		(Saudi Arabia) Al Qadisiya
3	DF	Ahmed Al-Bahri	18 September 1980 (aged 18)		(Saudi Arabia) Al Ittifaq
4	DF	Bandr Al-Mutairi	9 July 1980 (aged 18)		(Saudi Arabia) Al-Hilal
5	DF	Tariq Al-Muwallad	20 July 1980 (aged 18)		(Saudi Arabia) Al Ittihad
6	MF	Fahad Al-Subaie	15 November 1979 (aged 19)		(Saudi Arabia) Al Shabab
7	DF	**Saleh Al-Saqri**	23 January 1979 (aged 20)		(Saudi Arabia) Al Ittihad
8	MF	Saad Al-Shehri	9 January 1980 (aged 19)		(Saudi Arabia) Al Ittifaq
9	FW	Mohamad Dabo	28 May 1979 (aged 19)		(Saudi Arabia) Al Ahly
10	MF	Bader Al-Hagbani	17 January 1979 (aged 20)		(Saudi Arabia) Al-Nasr
11	FW	Talal Al-Abdulaziz	16 December 1979 (aged 19)		(Saudi Arabia) Al-Nasr
12	MF	Turki Al-Shayei	28 August 1979 (aged 19)		(Saudi Arabia) Al-Hilal
13	DF	Omar Al-Garni	29 April 1979 (aged 19)		(Saudi Arabia) Al Ittihad
14	MF	Mansour Al-Shahrani	16 May 1979 (aged 19)		(Saudi Arabia) Al-Hilal
15	MF	**Fahad Al-Zahrani**	2 February 1979 (aged 20)		(Saudi Arabia) Al Ahly
16	DF	Faisal Al-Obaili	8 February 1979 (aged 20)		(Saudi Arabia) Al Shabab
17	FW	Abdulrahman Al-Abeah	28 May 1979 (aged 19)		(Saudi Arabia) Al Ittifaq
18	GK	Bandar Al-Mas	11 May 1980 (aged 18)		(Saudi Arabia) Al-Hilal

== Group D ==
=== South Korea ===
Head coach: (South Korea) Cho Young-jeung

No.	Pos.	Player	Date of birth (age)	Caps	Club
1	GK	**Kim Yong-dae**	11 October 1979 (aged 19)		(South Korea) Yonsei University
2	DF	An Hong-chan	22 January 1980 (aged 19)		(South Korea) Sungkyunkwan University
3	DF	Lee Bum-jik	11 February 1979 (aged 20)		(South Korea) Daegu University
4	DF	Shin Dong-keun	15 February 1981 (aged 18)		(South Korea) Chunggu High School
5	DF	**Park Dong-hyuk**	18 April 1979 (aged 19)		(South Korea) Korea University
6	MF	**Song Chong-gug**	20 February 1979 (aged 20)		(South Korea) Yonsei University
7	MF	**Seo Ki-bok**	28 January 1979 (aged 20)		(South Korea) Yonsei University
8	MF	Chun Jae-ho	8 August 1979 (aged 19)		(South Korea) Hongik University
9	FW	Na Hee-keun	5 May 1979 (aged 19)		(South Korea) Ajou University
10	FW	**Kim Eun-jung**	8 April 1979 (aged 19)		(South Korea) Daejeon Citizen
11	FW	**Seol Ki-hyeon**	8 January 1979 (aged 20)		(South Korea) Kwangwoon University
12	GK	Han Dong-jin	25 August 1979 (aged 19)		(South Korea) Sangji University
13	MF	Kim Kun-hyung	11 September 1979 (aged 19)		(South Korea) Kyung Hee University
14	MF	Kim Kyung-il	30 August 1980 (aged 18)		(South Korea) Chunnam Dragons
15	FW	Seo Kwan-soo	25 February 1980 (aged 19)		(South Korea) Dankook University
16	FW	Ko Bong-hyun	2 July 1979 (aged 19)		(South Korea) Hongik University
17	FW	Woo Jin-seok	26 August 1979 (aged 19)		(South Korea) Yonsei University
18	FW	**Lee Dong-gook**	29 April 1979 (aged 19)		(South Korea) Pohang Steelers

=== Mali ===
Head coach: (Mali) Mamadou Coulibaly

No.	Pos.	Player	Date of birth (age)	Caps	Club
1	GK	Ibrahim Boubacar Keita	30 June 1979 (aged 19)		(Mali) Stade Malien
2	FW	**Dramane Coulibaly**	18 March 1979 (aged 20)		(France) Marseille
3	DF	Abdou Traoré	5 August 1981 (aged 17)		(Mali) CSK Bamako
4	DF	**Adama Coulibaly**	9 October 1980 (aged 18)		(Mali) Djoliba
5	MF	Sadio Baba Cisse	2 April 1979 (aged 20)		(Mali) Stade Malien
6	MF	Bakou Younkara	13 June 1980 (aged 18)		(Mali) Djoliba
7	FW	**Tenema N'Diaye**	13 February 1981 (aged 18)		(Mali) Djoliba
8	MF	**Mahamadou Diarra**	18 May 1981 (aged 17)		(Greece) OFI Crete
9	FW	**Mamadou Bagayoko**	21 May 1979 (aged 19)		(France) Sens
10	MF	**Seydou Keita**	16 January 1980 (aged 19)		(France) Marseille
11	FW	Sidi Makan Sissoko	10 April 1981 (aged 17)		(Mali) Sigui
12	DF	Amadou Coulibaly	5 December 1981 (aged 17)		(Switzerland) Sion
13	DF	**Abdoulaye Camara**	2 January 1980 (aged 19)		(Italy) Udinese
14	FW	Mamadou Diarra	8 January 1980 (aged 19)		(Mali) Stade Malien
15	FW	**Mahamadou Dissa**	18 May 1979 (aged 19)		(Mali) CSK Bamako
16	GK	Issiaka Traore	2 March 1980 (aged 19)		(Mali) Djoliba
17	DF	Sega Diakite	14 November 1980 (aged 18)		(Mali) Stade Malien
18	DF	Cheick Dao	25 September 1982 (aged 16)		(Turkey) Antalyaspor

=== Portugal ===
Head coach: (Portugal) Jesualdo Ferreira

No.	Pos.	Player	Date of birth (age)	Caps	Goals	Club
1	GK	Sérgio Leite	16 August 1979 (aged 19)	9	0	(Portuguese Football Federation) Boavista
2	MF	Filipe Anunciação	27 May 1979 (aged 19)	3	0	(Portuguese Football Federation) Feirense
3	DF	**Marco Caneira**	9 February 1979 (aged 20)	6	0	(Portuguese Football Federation) Beira-Mar
4	DF	André Correia	9 February 1979 (aged 20)	10	3	(Portuguese Football Federation) Maia
5	MF	Fredy	14 August 1979 (aged 19)	6	0	(Portuguese Football Federation) Felgueiras
6	MF	**Hugo Leal**	21 May 1980 (aged 18)	0	0	(Portuguese Football Federation) Benfica
7	MF	Ricardo Esteves	16 September 1979 (aged 19)	9	0	(Portuguese Football Federation) Vitória de Setúbal
8	MF	Ricardo Sousa	11 January 1979 (aged 20)	7	2	(Portuguese Football Federation) Beira-Mar
9	MF	Paulo Costa	5 December 1979 (aged 19)	10	2	(Portuguese Football Federation) Alverca
10	MF	**Simão**	31 October 1979 (aged 19)	0	0	(Portuguese Football Federation) Sporting CP
11	MF	Alhandra	5 March 1979 (aged 20)	7	1	(Portuguese Football Federation) Lourinhanense
12	GK	Márcio Santos	5 May 1979 (aged 19)	4	0	(Portuguese Football Federation) Lourinhanense
13	FW	Filipe Cândido	28 September 1979 (aged 19)	6	3	(Portuguese Football Federation) Salgueiros
14	MF	Luís Filipe	14 June 1979 (aged 19)	4	0	(Portuguese Football Federation) Académica de Coimbra
15	MF	Marco Claúdio	5 May 1979 (aged 19)	2	0	(Portuguese Football Federation) Grupo União Sport
16	MF	**Neca**	31 December 1979 (aged 19)	0	0	(Portuguese Football Federation) Belenenses
17	FW	Dani Rodrigues	3 March 1980 (aged 19)	4	1	(The Football Association) Southampton
18	DF	Hugo Carreira	10 March 1979 (aged 20)	7	0	(Portuguese Football Federation) Barreirense

=== Uruguay ===
Head coach: (Uruguay) Víctor Púa

No.	Pos.	Player	Date of birth (age)	Caps	Club
1	GK	**Fabián Carini**	26 December 1979 (aged 19)		(Uruguay) Danubio
2	DF	Fernando Carreño	15 January 1979 (aged 20)		(Uruguay) Peñarol
3	DF	**Gonzalo Sorondo**	9 October 1979 (aged 19)		(Uruguay) Defensor Sporting
4	DF	**Carlos Díaz**	4 February 1979 (aged 20)		(Uruguay) Defensor Sporting
5	DF	**Omar Pouso**	28 February 1980 (aged 19)		(Uruguay) Danubio
6	DF	**César Pellegrín**	5 March 1979 (aged 20)		(Italy) Ternana
7	MF	Alejandro Correa	26 November 1979 (aged 19)		(Uruguay) Nacional
8	MF	**Diego Pérez**	18 May 1980 (aged 18)		(Uruguay) Defensor Sporting
9	FW	**Javier Chevantón**	12 August 1980 (aged 18)		(Uruguay) Danubio
10	MF	**Martín Ligüera**	9 November 1980 (aged 18)		(Uruguay) Nacional
11	MF	**Jorge Anchén**	17 August 1980 (aged 18)		(Uruguay) Danubio
12	GK	**Mauricio Nanni**	12 July 1979 (aged 19)		(Uruguay) Montevideo Wanderers
13	DF	Damián Macaluso	9 March 1980 (aged 19)		(Uruguay) River Plate
14	FW	**Diego Forlán**	19 May 1979 (aged 19)		(Argentina) Independiente
15	DF	Fernando Albermager	19 January 1979 (aged 20)		(Uruguay) Peñarol
16	MF	Fernando Machado	26 September 1979 (aged 19)		(Mexico) UNAM Pumas
17	FW	**Fabián Canobbio**	8 March 1980 (aged 19)		(Uruguay) Progreso
18	FW	Fernando Daniel Cardozo	27 April 1979 (aged 19)		(Uruguay) Huracán Buceo

== Group E ==
=== Cameroon ===
Head coach: (Nigeria) Ikouam Gweha

No.	Pos.	Player	Date of birth (age)	Caps	Club
1	GK	**Carlos Kameni**	18 February 1984 (aged 15)		(France) Le Havre
2	FW	Thierry Modo Abouna	20 May 1981 (aged 17)		(Cameroon) Canon Yaounde
3	DF	**Innocent Hamga**	8 May 1981 (aged 17)		(Cameroon) Cotonsport Garoua
4	DF	Clément Lebe	9 January 1979 (aged 20)		(Cameroon) Racing Bafoussam
5	DF	Benoit Fils Moussongui	27 June 1980 (aged 18)		(Cameroon) Racing Bafoussam
6	MF	Hugues Nzinkeu	22 February 1980 (aged 19)		(Cameroon) Fovu Baham
7	MF	**Modeste M'bami**	9 October 1982 (aged 16)		(Cameroon) Dynamo Douala
8	FW	Samuel Inogue	18 December 1980 (aged 18)		(Cameroon) Racing Bafoussam
9	FW	**Francis Kioyo**	18 September 1979 (aged 19)		(Cameroon) Union Douala
10	FW	Francois Dikoume	17 January 1979 (aged 20)		(Cameroon) Fovu Baham
11	FW	Gaspard Komol	28 April 1980 (aged 18)		(Cameroon) Dynamo Douala
12	FW	**Mohammadou Idrissou**	8 March 1980 (aged 19)		(Cameroon) Cotonsport Garoua
13	DF	**Jean-Pierre Tcheutchoua**	12 December 1980 (aged 18)		(Cameroon) Dynamo Douala
14	MF	**Daniel Kome**	19 May 1980 (aged 18)		(Spain) Atlético Madrid B
15	DF	Ibrahima Salifou	14 October 1980 (aged 18)		(Cameroon) Cotonsport Garoua
16	GK	Gilbert N'Djema	9 August 1979 (aged 19)		(France) Red Star
17	MF	Daniel Bikoi	12 December 1982 (aged 16)		(Cameroon) Sable
18	MF	William Tabi	13 November 1981 (aged 17)		(Cameroon) Sable

=== England ===
Head coach: (England) Chris Ramsey

No.	Pos.	Player	Date of birth (age)	Caps	Club
1	GK	Stuart Taylor	28 November 1980 (aged 18)		(England) Arsenal
2	MF	Greg Lincoln	23 March 1980 (aged 19)		(England) Arsenal
3	MF	**Ashley Cole**	20 December 1980 (aged 18)		(England) Arsenal
4	DF	Stephen Wright	8 February 1980 (aged 19)		(England) Liverpool
5	DF	Steve Haslam	6 September 1979 (aged 19)		(England) Sheffield Wednesday
6	DF	Neil Murphy	19 May 1980 (aged 18)		(England) Liverpool
7	FW	**Peter Crouch**	30 January 1981 (aged 18)		(England) Tottenham Hotspur
8	FW	**Andrew Johnson**	10 February 1981 (aged 18)		(England) Birmingham City
9	FW	Craig Dudley	12 September 1979 (aged 19)		(England) Notts County
10	FW	John Piercy	18 September 1979 (aged 19)		(England) Tottenham Hotspur
11	MF	Matthew Etherington	14 August 1981 (aged 17)		(England) Peterborough United
12	DF	Adam Chambers	20 November 1980 (aged 18)		(England) West Bromwich Albion
13	GK	Paul Rachubka	21 May 1981 (aged 17)		(England) Manchester United
14	DF	James Chambers	20 November 1980 (aged 18)		(England) West Bromwich Albion
15	MF	Kevin Nicholls	2 January 1979 (aged 20)		(England) Charlton Athletic
16	DF	Richard Cooper	27 September 1979 (aged 19)		(England) Nottingham Forest
17	MF	Paolo Vernazza	1 November 1979 (aged 19)		(England) Arsenal
18	FW	Adam Oliver	25 October 1980 (aged 18)		(England) West Bromwich Albion

=== Japan ===
Head coach: (France) Philippe Troussier

No.	Pos.	Player	Date of birth (age)	Caps	Club
1	GK	Tatsuya Enomoto	16 March 1979 (aged 20)		(Japan) Yokohama F. Marinos
2	DF	Kazuki Teshima	7 June 1979 (aged 19)		(Japan) Kyoto Purple Sanga
3	DF	Shigeki Tsujimoto	23 June 1979 (aged 19)		(Japan) Kyoto Purple Sanga
4	MF	Tatsuya Ishikawa	25 December 1979 (aged 19)		(Japan) University of Tsukuba
5	MF	**Akira Kaji**	13 January 1980 (aged 19)		(Japan) Cerezo Osaka
6	MF	**Junichi Inamoto**	18 September 1979 (aged 19)		(Japan) Gamba Osaka
7	MF	**Tomoyuki Sakai**	29 June 1979 (aged 19)		(Japan) JEF United Ichihara
8	MF	**Mitsuo Ogasawara**	5 April 1979 (aged 19)		(Japan) Kashima Antlers
9	FW	**Naohiro Takahara**	4 June 1979 (aged 19)		(Japan) Júbilo Iwata
10	MF	**Masashi Motoyama**	20 June 1979 (aged 19)		(Japan) Kashima Antlers
11	MF	**Yasuhito Endō**	28 January 1980 (aged 19)		(Japan) Kyoto Purple Sanga
12	DF	**Kōji Nakata**	9 July 1979 (aged 19)		(Japan) Kashima Antlers
13	MF	**Shinji Ono**	27 September 1979 (aged 19)		(Japan) Urawa Red Diamonds
14	FW	**Yuichiro Nagai**	14 February 1979 (aged 20)		(Japan) Urawa Red Diamonds
15	FW	Yasunori Takada	22 February 1979 (aged 20)		(Japan) Bellmare Hiratsuka
16	FW	**Ryūji Bando**	2 August 1979 (aged 19)		(Japan) Gamba Osaka
17	MF	Hideyuki Ujiie	23 February 1979 (aged 20)		(Japan) Omiya Ardija
18	GK	Yuta Minami	30 September 1979 (aged 19)		(Japan) Kashiwa Reysol

=== United States ===
Head coach: (Germany) (United States) Sigi Schmid

No.	Pos.	Player	Date of birth (age)	Caps	Club
1	GK	**Nick Rimando**	17 June 1979 (aged 19)		(United States) UCLA
2	MF	**John Thorrington**	17 October 1979 (aged 19)		(England) Manchester United
3	DF	**Nick Garcia**	9 April 1979 (aged 19)		(United States) Indiana University
4	DF	**Danny Califf**	17 March 1980 (aged 19)		(United States) University of Maryland
5	DF	Rusty Pierce	24 July 1979 (aged 19)		(United States) UNC Greensboro
6	DF	**Steve Cherundolo**	19 February 1979 (aged 20)		(Germany) Hannover 96
7	DF	Nick Downing	25 January 1980 (aged 19)		(United States) University of Maryland
8	DF	Lee Morrison	10 August 1979 (aged 19)		(United States) Stanford University
9	MF	Ryan Futagaki	17 January 1980 (aged 19)		(United States) UCLA
10	FW	**Chris Albright**	14 January 1979 (aged 20)		(United States) University of Virginia
11	MF	Francisco Gomez	25 January 1979 (aged 20)		(United States) Kansas City Wizards
12	MF	Shaun Tsakiris	16 February 1979 (aged 20)		(United States) UCLA
13	DF	**Carlos Bocanegra**	25 May 1979 (aged 19)		(United States) UCLA
14	MF	Matt Goldsmith	27 April 1979 (aged 19)		(United States) Furman University
15	FW	**Taylor Twellman**	29 February 1980 (aged 19)		(United States) University of Maryland
16	MF	**Cory Gibbs**	14 January 1980 (aged 19)		(United States) Brown University
17	FW	Jamar Beasley	11 October 1979 (aged 19)		(United States) New England Revolution
18	GK	**Tim Howard**	6 March 1979 (aged 20)		(United States) NY MetroStars

== Group F ==
=== Brazil ===
Head coach: (Brazil) João Carlos

No.	Pos.	Player	Date of birth (age)	Caps	Club
1	GK	**Júlio César**	3 September 1979 (aged 19)		(Brazil) Flamengo
2	DF	Índio	3 April 1979 (aged 20)		(Brazil) Corinthians
3	DF	**Juan**	1 February 1979 (aged 20)		(Brazil) Flamengo
4	DF	Fábio Bilica	4 January 1979 (aged 20)		(Italy) Venezia
5	MF	Ferrugem	6 October 1980 (aged 18)		(Brazil) Palmeiras
6	DF	Fábio Aurélio	24 September 1979 (aged 19)		(Brazil) São Paulo
7	FW	**Ronaldinho**	21 March 1980 (aged 19)		(Brazil) Grêmio
8	MF	Alexandre	19 February 1979 (aged 20)		(Brazil) São Paulo
9	FW	Fernando Baiano	18 March 1979 (aged 20)		(Brazil) Corinthians
10	FW	Edu	10 January 1979 (aged 20)		(Brazil) São Paulo
11	MF	Matuzalém	10 June 1980 (aged 18)		(Brazil) Vitória
12	GK	Fábio	30 July 1980 (aged 18)		(Brazil) União Bandeirante
13	DF	**Mancini**	1 August 1980 (aged 18)		(Brazil) Atlético Mineiro
14	DF	Milton Rogério	24 February 1979 (aged 20)		(Brazil) Paraná Clube
15	DF	Tiago Silva	4 April 1979 (aged 19)		(Brazil) Palmeiras
16	FW	Rodrigo Gral	9 January 1982 (aged 17)		(Brazil) Juventude
17	MF	**Geovanni**	11 January 1980 (aged 19)		(Brazil) Cruzeiro
18	DF	Fernando	25 February 1980 (aged 19)		(Brazil) Flamengo

=== Honduras ===
Head coach: (Honduras) Jose de la Paz Herrera

No.	Pos.	Player	Date of birth (age)	Caps	Club
1	GK	Javier Pérez	16 January 1979 (aged 20)		(Honduras) Atlético Independiente
2	MF	Eddy Contreras	16 September 1979 (aged 19)		(Honduras) CD Olimpia
3	DF	Gerson Vásquez	20 March 1979 (aged 20)		(Honduras) Melgar
4	DF	Júnior Izaguirre	12 August 1979 (aged 19)		(Honduras) Motagua
5	DF	Érick Vallecillo	29 January 1980 (aged 19)		(Honduras) Real España
6	DF	Carlos Lino	16 April 1979 (aged 19)		(Honduras) Victoria
7	DF	Juan Raudales	15 July 1979 (aged 19)		(Honduras) Motagua
8	FW	Reynaldo Tilguath	4 August 1979 (aged 19)		(Honduras) Olimpia
9	FW	**David Suazo**	5 November 1979 (aged 19)		(Honduras) Olimpia
10	MF	Julio César de León	13 September 1979 (aged 19)		(Honduras) Platense
11	DF	Héctor Gutiérrez	8 February 1980 (aged 19)		(Honduras) Real España
12	MF	Maynor Suazo	10 August 1979 (aged 19)		(Honduras) Marathón
13	MF	Elmer Marín	14 October 1979 (aged 19)		(Honduras) Olimpia
14	MF	Edgar Álvarez	9 January 1980 (aged 19)		(Honduras) Platense
15	DF	Milton Palacios	25 December 1980 (aged 18)		(Honduras) Olimpia
16	DF	Oscar Fortín	25 June 1980 (aged 18)		(Honduras) Motagua
17	MF	Carlos Oliva	28 July 1979 (aged 19)		(Honduras) Real España
18	GK	Luis Siliezar	11 September 1980 (aged 18)		(Honduras) Platense

=== Spain ===
Head coach: (Spain) Iñaki Sáez

No.	Pos.	Player	Date of birth (age)	Caps	Club
1	GK	**Daniel Aranzubia**	18 September 1979 (aged 19)		(Spain) Athletic Bilbao
2	DF	Pablo Coira	18 October 1979 (aged 19)		(Spain) Compostela
3	DF	David Bermudo	14 January 1979 (aged 20)		(Spain) Barcelona
4	DF	Francisco Jusué	30 November 1979 (aged 19)		(Spain) Osasuna
5	DF	**Pablo Orbaiz** (c)	6 February 1979 (aged 20)		(Spain) Osasuna
6	DF	**Carlos Marchena**	21 July 1979 (aged 19)		(Spain) Sevilla
7	MF	**Gabri**	10 February 1979 (aged 20)		(Spain) Barcelona
8	MF	**Xavi**	25 January 1980 (aged 19)		(Spain) Barcelona
9	FW	Pablo Couñago	9 August 1979 (aged 19)		(Spain) Numancia
10	MF	Gonzalo Colsa	2 April 1979 (aged 20)		(Spain) Logroñés
11	MF	Francisco Yeste	6 December 1979 (aged 19)		(Spain) Athletic Bilbao
12	DF	Fernando Varela	1 September 1979 (aged 19)		(Spain) Real Betis
13	GK	**Iker Casillas**	20 May 1981 (aged 17)		(Spain) Real Madrid
14	FW	Álex Lombardero	1 March 1979 (aged 20)		(Spain) Lugo
15	FW	David Aganzo	10 January 1981 (aged 18)		(Spain) Real Madrid
16	MF	José Barkero	27 April 1979 (aged 19)		(Spain) Real Sociedad
17	FW	Rubén Suárez	19 February 1979 (aged 20)		(Spain) Sporting Gijón
18	MF	Álvaro Rubio	18 April 1979 (aged 19)		(Spain) Real Zaragoza

=== Zambia ===
Head coach: (Zambia) Patrick Phiri

No.	Pos.	Player	Date of birth (age)	Caps	Club
1	GK	Stanley Mumba	22 November 1979 (aged 19)		(Zambia) Power Dynamos
2	DF	**Misheck Lungu**	2 June 1980 (aged 18)		(Zambia) City of Lusaka
3	DF	Aaron Simutowe	2 February 1980 (aged 19)		(Zambia) Zamsure
4	DF	Kenny Zimba	27 September 1980 (aged 18)		(Zambia) Kalulushi Modern Stars
5	MF	**Ian Bakala**	1 November 1980 (aged 18)		(Belgium) Germinal Ekeren
6	MF	**Gift Kampamba**	1 January 1979 (aged 20)		(Zambia) Nkana Red Devils
7	FW	Japhet Makayi	15 November 1979 (aged 19)		(Zambia) Power Dynamos
8	MF	Ronald Mbambara	12 March 1979 (aged 20)		(Zambia) Nchanga Rangers
9	DF	**Francis Kasonde**	28 December 1979 (aged 19)		(Zambia) Konkola Blades FC
10	FW	**Chaswe Nsofwa**	22 October 1978 (aged 20)		(Zambia) Zanaco
11	DF	Evans Mwaba	10 October 1979 (aged 19)		(Zambia) Nchanga Rangers
12	DF	Kampamba Chiwtu	28 December 1980 (aged 18)		(Zambia) Kabwe Warriors
13	DF	Festus Mangamu	15 November 1981 (aged 17)		(Zambia) Railway Express FC
14	MF	**Perry Mutapa**	18 November 1979 (aged 19)		(Portugal) Farense
15	MF	**Emmanuel Zulu**	3 January 1981 (aged 18)		(Zambia) Zanaco FC
16	GK	Stephen Kabwe	22 February 1979 (aged 20)		(Zambia) Nchanga Rangers
17	MF	**Andrew Sinkala**	18 June 1979 (aged 19)		(Zambia) Nchanga Rangers
18	FW	Bernard Makufi	6 January 1979 (aged 20)		(Zambia) Nkana Red Devils
