= 1999 African Youth Championship =

Tournament details
- Host country: Ghana
- Dates: 21 February – 7 March
- Teams: 8

Final positions
- Champions: Ghana (2nd title)
- Runners-up: Nigeria
- Third place: Cameroon
- Fourth place: Zambia

The 1999 African Youth Championship was the tenth edition of the continental Under-20 football competition, held in Ghana. It also served as qualification for the 1999 FIFA World Youth Championship.

== Qualification ==
=== Preliminary round ===
Gambia and Namibia withdrew before playing. As a result, Burkina Faso and Malawi advanced to the next round. Mauritania withdrew after one match and Libya went through.

| Team 1 | Agg. | Team 2 | 1st leg | 2nd leg |
|---|---|---|---|---|
| Mozambique | 6–5 | Réunion | 4–4 | 2–1 |
| Sierra Leone | 6–5 | Liberia | 4–3 | 2–2 |
| Lesotho | 3–2 | Swaziland | 2–1 | 1–1 |
| Congo | 3–2 | Togo | 2–1 | 1–1 |
| Rwanda | 2–1 | Chad | 1–1 | 1–0 |
| Mauritania | w/o | Libya | 2–2 | w/o |

=== First round ===
Burkina Faso withdrew before playing. As a result, Nigeria advanced to the next round.

| Team 1 | Agg. | Team 2 | 1st leg | 2nd leg |
|---|---|---|---|---|
| Libya | 5–4 | Tunisia | 3–3 | 2–1 |
| Sierra Leone | 2–4 | Mali | 1–3 | 1–1 |
| Angola | 5–2 | Gabon | 3–2 | 2–0 |
| Congo | 1–4 | Ivory Coast | 1–1 | 0–3 |
| Uganda | 2–4 | Tanzania | 1–1 | 1–3 |
| Ethiopia | 1–2 | Egypt | 0–0 | 1–2 |
| Lesotho | 3–4 | Zambia | 2–2 | 1–2 |
| Rwanda | 2–3 | Cameroon | 2–0 | 0–3 |
| Burundi | 2–1 | Sudan | 1–1 | 1–0 |
| Algeria | 3–6 | Guinea | 3–2 | 0–4 |
| Senegal | 1–1 | Morocco | 1–1 | 0–0 |
| Malawi | (a)2–2 | Botswana | 1–0 | 1–2 |
| Mozambique | 2–2 (p: 3–4) | South Africa | 1–1 | 1–1 |

=== Second round ===
| Team 1 | Agg. | Team 2 | 1st leg | 2nd leg |
|---|---|---|---|---|
| Ivory Coast | 4–4 (p: 3–4) | Angola | 4–0 | 0–4 |
| Nigeria | 4–2 | Tanzania | 3–1 | 1–1 |
| Zambia | 3–3 (p: 6–5) | Egypt | 3–0 | 0–3 |
| Burundi | 1–2 | Cameroon | 1–2 | 0–0 |
| Morocco | 0–4 | Guinea | 0–4 | 0–0 |
| South Africa | 1–5 | Malawi | 0–1 | 1–4 |
| Mali | 5–4 | Libya | 3–0 | 2–4 |

== Teams ==
The following teams qualified for tournament:

- Angola
- Cameroon
- Ghana (host)
- Guinea
- Malawi
- Mali
- Nigeria
- Zambia

== Group stage ==
=== Group A ===
| Pos | Team | Pld | W | D | L | GF | GA | GD | Pts | Qualification |
|---|---|---|---|---|---|---|---|---|---|---|
| 1 | Ghana (H) | 3 | 2 | 1 | 0 | 7 | 1 | +6 | 7 | Advance to knockout stage |
| 2 | Cameroon | 3 | 1 | 2 | 0 | 3 | 2 | +1 | 5 | Advance to knockout stage |
| 3 | Mali | 3 | 1 | 1 | 1 | 4 | 3 | +1 | 4 | Advance to fifth place play-off |
| 4 | Angola | 3 | 0 | 0 | 3 | 1 | 9 | −8 | 0 | |

Rules for classification: Group tiebreakers
(H) Hosts
21 February

| Ghana | 1–0 | Mali |

21 February

| Angola | 0–1 | Cameroon |

24 February

| Mali | 1–1 | Cameroon |

24 February

| Angola | 0–5 | Ghana |

27 February

| Mali | 3–1 | Angola |

27 February

| Cameroon | 1–1 | Ghana |

=== Group B ===
| Pos | Team | Pld | W | D | L | GF | GA | GD | Pts | Qualification |
|---|---|---|---|---|---|---|---|---|---|---|
| 1 | Nigeria | 3 | 2 | 1 | 0 | 9 | 3 | +6 | 7 | Advance to knockout stage |
| 2 | Zambia | 3 | 2 | 1 | 0 | 7 | 2 | +5 | 7 | Advance to knockout stage |
| 3 | Guinea | 3 | 1 | 0 | 2 | 8 | 12 | −4 | 3 | Advance to fifth place play-off |
| 4 | Malawi | 3 | 0 | 0 | 3 | 2 | 9 | −7 | 0 | |

Rules for classification: Group tiebreakers
22 February

| Zambia | 1–0 | Malawi |

22 February

| Guinea | 3–4 | Nigeria |

25 February

| Malawi | 0–5 | Nigeria |

25 February

| Guinea | 2-6 | Zambia |

28 February

| Malawi | 2–3 | Guinea |

28 February

| Nigeria | 0–0 | Zambia |

== Knockout stage ==
=== Fifth place play-off ===
3 March

| Mali | 4–1 | Guinea |

=== Semi-finals ===
4 March

| Ghana | 3–1 | Zambia |

Accra
4 March

| Nigeria | 2–1 | Cameroon |

Accra

=== Third place play-off ===
7 March

| Cameroon | 2–1 | Zambia |

Accra

=== Final ===
7 March

| Ghana | 1–0 | Nigeria |
|---|---|---|
| Laryea Kingston 40' |

Accra
Referee: (Morocco) Mohamed Guezaz

Further information

Assistant Referees:

- (South Africa) Carlos Henriques
- (Uganda) Tomusange Ali
- (Cape Verde) Monteiro Duarte

Cautions:

- (Ghana) Kofi Amoako (yellow card) 43'
- (Nigeria) Aminu Sani (yellow card) 54'
- (Nigeria) Sunday Adu (yellow card) 59'
- (Nigeria) Sam Okoye (yellow card) 61'

Line-ups

| Nigeria | Ghana |
| Sam Okoye; Ikenna Eneh; Emmanuel Izuuagha; John Aranka; Haruna Babangida (Joseph Yobo 82’); Hashimu Garba; Aminu Sani (Julius Aghahowa 70’); Abubakar Musa; Pius Ikedia; Rabiu Afolabi; Sunday Adu | Sammy Adjei; Baffour Gyan; Abdul Rahman Issah (Theophilus Amuzu 38’); Abdul Razak; Hamza Mohammed; Kofi Amoako (Emmanuel Adjogu 68’); Aziz Ansah; Laryea Kingston; Johnson Eku (Awule Quayejme 76’); George Blay; Owusu Afriyie |

1999 African Youth Championship

Ghana
Second title

== Qualification to World Youth Championship ==
The five best performing teams qualified for the 1999 FIFA World Youth Championship.

- Cameroon
- Ghana
- Mali
- Nigeria (host)
- Zambia
