= 1999 FIFA World Youth Championship =

FIFA U-20 World Cup Nigeria 1999

Tournament details
- Host country: Nigeria
- Dates: 3–24 April
- Teams: 24 (from 6 confederations)
- Venues: 8 (in 8 host cities)

Final positions
- Champions: Spain (1st title)
- Runners-up: Japan
- Third place: Mali
- Fourth place: Uruguay

Tournament statistics
- Matches played: 52
- Goals scored: 158 (3.04 per match)
- Attendance: 624,400 (12,008 per match)
- Top scorer(s): (Spain) Pablo Couñago (Mali) Mahamadou Dissa (5 goals)
- Best player: (Mali) Seydou Keita
- Fair play award: Croatia

The 1999 FIFA World Youth Championship took place in Nigeria between 3 and 24 April 1999. This was the 12th edition of the tournament.

== Qualification ==
The following 24 teams qualified for the 1999 FIFA World Youth Championship.

Confederation	Qualifying Tournament	Qualifier(s)
AFC (Asia)	1998 AFC Youth Championship	Japan; Kazakhstan^{1} South Korea; Saudi Arabia
CAF (Africa)	Host nation	Nigeria
CAF (Africa)	1999 African Youth Championship	Cameroon; Ghana; Mali; Zambia^{1}
CONCACAF (North, Central America & Caribbean)	1998 CONCACAF U-20 Tournament	Costa Rica; Honduras; Mexico; United States
CONMEBOL (South America)	1999 South American Youth Championship	Argentina; Brazil; Paraguay; Uruguay
OFC (Oceania)	1998 OFC U-20 Championship	Australia
UEFA (Europe)	1998 UEFA European Under-18 Football Championship	Croatia^{1} England; Germany; Portugal; Republic of Ireland; Spain

1.Teams that made their debut.

== Match officials ==
Confederation	Referee
AFC	Simon Micallef (Australia)
AFC	Lu Jun (China)
AFC	Ahmad Nabil Ayad (Lebanon)
CAF	Mohamed Guezzaz (Morocco)
CAF	Olufunmi Olaniyan (Nigeria)
CAF	Mourad Daami (Tunisia)
CONCACAF
CONCACAF	William Mattus (Costa Rica)
CONCACAF	Felipe Ramos Rizo (Mexico)
CONMEBOL	Ángel Sánchez (Argentina)
CONMEBOL	Carlos Eugênio Simon (Brazil)
CONMEBOL	Gustavo Méndez (Uruguay)
UEFA	Sergei Shmolik (Belarus)
UEFA	Željko Širić (Croatia)
UEFA	Claus Bo Larsen (Denmark)

== Venues ==
Ibadan	Lagos	Enugu	Port Harcourt
Liberty Stadium	National Stadium	Nnamdi Azikiwe Stadium	Liberation Stadium
Capacity: 40,000	Capacity: 45,000	Capacity: 22,000	Capacity: 25,000
1999 FIFA World Youth Championship (Nigeria)
Kano	Calabar	Kaduna	Bauchi
Sani Abacha Stadium	U.J. Esuene Stadium	Ahmadu Bello Stadium	Abubarkar Tafawa Balewa Stadium
Capacity: 18,000	Capacity: 16,000	Capacity: 16,500	Capacity: 15,000

== Group stage ==
The 24 teams were split into six groups of four teams. Six group winners, six second-place finishers and the four best third-place finishers qualify for the knockout round.

=== Group A ===
Pos	Team	Pld	W	D	L	GF	GA	GD	Pts	Group stage result
1	Paraguay	3	2	0	1	5	6	−1	6	Advance to knockout stage
2	Nigeria (H)	3	1	1	1	4	3	+1	4	Advance to knockout stage
3	Costa Rica	3	1	1	1	4	5	−1	4	Advance to knockout stage
4	Germany	3	1	0	2	5	4	+1	3	

(H) Hosts
3 April 1999
16:00

Nigeria	1–1	Costa Rica
Aghahowa 20'	(Report)	Meléndez 83' (pen.)

National Stadium, Lagos
Attendance: 37,500
Referee: Siarhei Shmolik (Belarus)

4 April 1999
16:00

Germany	4–0	Paraguay
Kern 44', 60', 69'; Falk 90'	(Report)

National Stadium, Lagos
Attendance: 2,500
Referee: Mohamed Guezzaz (Morocco)

7 April 1999
16:00

Nigeria	2–0	Germany
Shittu 69'; Garba 81'	(Report)

National Stadium, Lagos
Attendance: 20,000
Referee: Ángel Sánchez (Argentina)

7 April 1999
19:00

Costa Rica	1–3	Paraguay
Garita 30'	(Report)	Santa Cruz 26'; Vera 50'; Cuevas 66'

National Stadium, Lagos
Attendance: 18,000
Referee: Jan Wegereef (Netherlands)

10 April 1999
16:00

Nigeria	1–2	Paraguay
Shittu 38'	(Report)	Fernandez 9'; Maldonado 22'

National Stadium, Lagos
Attendance: 25,000
Referee: Jan Wegereef (Netherlands)

10 April 1999
19:00

Costa Rica	2–1	Germany
Brenes 33'; Santana 69'	(Report)	Timm 38'

National Stadium, Lagos
Attendance: 22,000
Referee: Ángel Sánchez (Argentina)

=== Group B ===
Pos	Team	Pld	W	D	L	GF	GA	GD	Pts	Group stage result
1	Ghana	3	2	1	0	5	1	+4	7	Advance to knockout stage
2	Croatia	3	1	2	0	6	2	+4	5	Advance to knockout stage
3	Argentina	3	1	1	1	1	1	0	4	Advance to knockout stage
4	Kazakhstan	3	0	0	3	1	9	−8	0	

4 April 1999
16:00

Ghana	1–1	Croatia
Ofori-Quaye 68'	(Report)	Deranja 22'

Ahmadou Bello Stadium, Kaduna
Attendance: 16,000
Referee: Lu Jun (China)

4 April 1999
19:00

Argentina	1–0	Kazakhstan
Cambiasso 44'	(Report)

Ahmadou Bello Stadium, Kaduna
Attendance: 16,000
Referee: Claus Bo Larsen (Denmark)

7 April 1999
16:00

Ghana	1–0	Argentina
Ofori-Quaye 76'	(Report)

Ahmadou Bello Stadium, Kaduna
Attendance: 5,000
Referee: Claus Bo Larsen (Denmark)

7 April 1999
19:00

Croatia	5–1	Kazakhstan
Deranja 7'; Miladin 11'; Sabolčki 34'; Banović 79'; Bjelanović 88'	(Report)	Urazayev 67'

Ahmadou Bello Stadium, Kaduna
Attendance: 5,000
Referee: Lu Jun (China)

10 April 1999
16:00

Ghana	3–0	Kazakhstan
Gyan 51', 69'; Adu 53'	(Report)

Ahmadou Bello Stadium, Kaduna
Attendance: 2,000
Referee: Claus Bo Larsen (Denmark)

10 April 1999
19:00

Croatia	0–0	Argentina
	(Report)

Ahmadou Bello Stadium, Kaduna
Attendance: 4,000
Referee: Lu Jun (China)

=== Group C ===
Pos	Team	Pld	W	D	L	GF	GA	GD	Pts	Group stage result
1	Mexico	3	2	1	0	5	2	+3	7	Advance to knockout stage
2	Republic of Ireland	3	2	0	1	6	1	+5	6	Advance to knockout stage
3	Australia	3	1	0	2	4	8	−4	3	
4	Saudi Arabia	3	0	1	2	2	6	−4	1	

4 April 1999
16:00

Australia	3–1	Saudi Arabia
Culina 29'; Maisano 72'; Al-Garni 77' (o.g.)	(Report)	Dabo 90'

Liberty Stadium, Ibadan
Attendance: 2,000
Referee: Gustavo Méndez (Uruguay)

4 April 1999
19:00

Mexico	1–0	Republic of Ireland
Márquez 10'	(Report)

Liberty Stadium, Ibadan
Attendance: 3,000
Referee: Carlos Eugênio Simon (Brazil)

7 April 1999
16:00

Australia	1–3	Mexico
Sterjovski 45'	(Report)	Márquez 2'; J. Rodríguez 58'; Osorno 83'

Liberty Stadium, Ibadan
Attendance: 500
Referee: Carlos Eugênio Simon (Brazil)

7 April 1999
19:00

Saudi Arabia	0–2	Republic of Ireland
	(Report)	McPhail 42'; Duff 65'

Liberty Stadium, Ibadan
Attendance: 1,000
Referee: Gustavo Méndez (Uruguay)

10 April 1999
16:00

Australia	0–4	Republic of Ireland
	(Report)	Sadlier 20'; Duff 73'; Healy 74'; Crossley 90'

Liberty Stadium, Ibadan
Attendance: 800
Referee: Gustavo Méndez (Uruguay)

10 April 1999
19:00

Saudi Arabia	1–1	Mexico
Al-Saqri 37'	(Report)	L. González 30'

Liberty Stadium, Ibadan
Attendance: 2,000
Referee: Siarhei Shmolik (Belarus)

=== Group D ===
Pos	Team	Pld	W	D	L	GF	GA	GD	Pts	Group stage result
1	Mali	3	2	0	1	6	6	0	6	Advance to knockout stage
2	Portugal	3	1	1	1	4	3	+1	4	Advance to knockout stage
3	Uruguay	3	1	1	1	2	2	0	4	Advance to knockout stage
4	South Korea	3	1	0	2	5	6	−1	3	

5 April 1999
16:00

Uruguay	1–2	Mali
Chevantón 65'	(Report)	Camara 51'; Dissa 90'

Nnamdi Azikiwe Stadium, Enugu
Attendance: 16,000
Referee: Željko Širić (Croatia)

5 April 1999
19:00

South Korea	1–3	Portugal
Kim K.H. 37'	(Report)	R. Sousa 27'; Simão 85', 90' (pen.)

Nnamdi Azikiwe Stadium, Enugu
Attendance: 10,000
Referee: Ahmad Nabil Ayad (Lebanon)

8 April 1999
16:00

Uruguay	1–0	South Korea
Chevantón 3'	(Report)

Nnamdi Azikiwe Stadium, Enugu
Attendance: 6,000
Referee: Željko Širić (Croatia)

8 April 1999
19:00

Mali	2–1	Portugal
Am. Coulibaly 15' (pen.); Ndiaye 45'	(Report)	P. Costa 55'

Nnamdi Azikiwe Stadium, Enugu
Attendance: 6,000
Referee: Ahmad Nabil Ayad (Lebanon)

11 April 1999
16:00

Uruguay	0–0	Portugal
	(Report)

Nnamdi Azikiwe Stadium, Enugu
Attendance: 4,000
Referee: Olufunmi Olaniyan (Nigeria)

11 April 1999
19:00

Mali	2–4	South Korea
Dissa 57'; Bagayoko 60'	(Report)	Seol K.H. 3', 35'; Na H.K. 22' (pen.); Lee D.G. 69'

Nnamdi Azikiwe Stadium, Enugu
Attendance: 4,000
Referee: Željko Širić (Croatia)

=== Group E ===
Pos	Team	Pld	W	D	L	GF	GA	GD	Pts	Group stage result
1	Japan	3	2	0	1	6	3	+3	6	Advance to knockout stage
2	United States	3	2	0	1	5	4	+1	6	Advance to knockout stage
3	Cameroon	3	2	0	1	4	4	0	6	Advance to knockout stage
4	England	3	0	0	3	0	4	−4	0	

5 April 1999
16:00

Cameroon	2–1	Japan
Komol 72', 89'	(Report)	Takahara 51'

Sani Abacha Stadium, Kano
Attendance: 12,000
Referee: William Mattus (Costa Rica)

5 April 1999
19:00

England	0–1	United States
	(Report)	Califf 12'

Sani Abacha Stadium, Kano
Attendance: 19,000
Referee: Mourad Daami (Tunisia)

8 April 1999
16:00

Cameroon	1–0	England
Cooper 63' (o.g.)	(Report)

Sani Abacha Stadium, Kano
Attendance: 12,000
Referee: William Mattus (Costa Rica)

8 April 1999
19:00

Japan	3–1	United States
Downing 10' (o.g.); Takahara 51'; Ogasawara 85'	(Report)	Futagaki 74'

Abubarkar Tafawa Balewa Stadium, Bauchi
Attendance: 9,000
Referee: Arturo Dauden Ibáñez (Spain)

11 April 1999
16:00

Cameroon	1–3	United States
Kioyo 63'	(Report)	Twellman 38', 79'; Bocanegra 57'

Abubarkar Tafawa Balewa Stadium, Bauchi
Attendance: 9,000
Referee: Arturo Dauden Ibáñez (Spain)

11 April 1999
19:00

Japan	2–0	England
Ishikawa 39'; Ono 48'	(Report)

Abubarkar Tafawa Balewa Stadium, Bauchi
Attendance: 9,000
Referee: Mourad Daami (Tunisia)

=== Group F ===
Pos	Team	Pld	W	D	L	GF	GA	GD	Pts	Group stage result
1	Spain	3	2	1	0	5	1	+4	7	Advance to knockout stage
2	Brazil	3	2	0	1	8	3	+5	6	Advance to knockout stage
3	Zambia	3	1	1	1	5	8	−3	4	
4	Honduras	3	0	0	3	4	10	−6	0	

5 April 1999

Zambia	4–3	Honduras
Makayi 19'; Makufi 44', 55'; Mbambara 72'	(Report)	Suazo 9', 90'; De León 41'

U.J. Esuene Stadium, Calabar
Attendance: 12,000
Referee: Simon Micallef (Australia)

5 April 1999

Spain	2–0	Brazil
Gabri 15', 33'	(Report)

U.J. Esuene Stadium, Calabar
Attendance: 12,000
Referee: Felipe Ramos (Mexico)

8 April 1999

Zambia	0–0	Spain
	(Report)

U.J. Esuene Stadium, Calabar
Attendance: 8,000
Referee: Felipe Ramos (Mexico)

8 April 1999

Honduras	0–3	Brazil
	(Report)	Edu 36', 80'; Matuzalém 41'

Liberation Stadium, Port Harcourt
Attendance: 16,000
Referee: Olufunmi Olaniyan (Nigeria)

11 April 1999

Zambia	1–5	Brazil
Sinkala 9'	(Report)	Ronaldinho 27'; Aurélio 45'; Baiano 65'; Mancini 69'; Rodrigo Gral 80'

Liberation Stadium, Port Harcourt
Attendance: 16,000
Referee: Simon Micallef (Australia)

11 April 1999

Honduras	1–3	Spain
Oliva 76'	(Report)	Pablo 10'; Varela 26'; Rubén 31'

Liberation Stadium, Port Harcourt
Attendance: 16,000
Referee: Mohamed Guezzaz (Morocco)

=== Ranking of third-placed teams ===
Pos	Grp	Team	Pld	W	D	L	GF	GA	GD	Pts	Result
1	E	Cameroon	3	2	0	1	4	4	0	6	Advance to knockout stage
2	D	Uruguay	3	1	1	1	2	2	0	4	Advance to knockout stage
3	B	Argentina	3	1	1	1	1	1	0	4	Advance to knockout stage
4	A	Costa Rica	3	1	1	1	4	5	−1	4	Advance to knockout stage
5	F	Zambia	3	1	1	1	5	8	−3	4	
6	C	Australia	3	1	0	2	4	8	−4	3	

== Knockout stage ==
=== Bracket ===
Round of 16
April 15 - Enugu
Mali (a.e.t.)	5
Cameroon	4
April 14 - Kano
Republic of Ireland	1 (3)
Nigeria (p)	1 (5)
April 15 - Port Harcourt
Spain	3
United States	2
April 14 - Kaduna
Ghana	2
Costa Rica	0
April 14 - Lagos
Paraguay	2 (9)
Uruguay (p)	2 (10)
April 14 - Calabar
Brazil	4
Croatia	0
April 15 - Bauchi
Japan (p)	1 (5)
Portugal	1 (4)
April 15 - Ibadan
Mexico	4
Argentina	1

Quarter-finals
April 18 - Enugu
Mali	3
Nigeria	1
April 18 - Kaduna
Spain (p)	1 (8)
Ghana	1 (7)
April 18 - Lagos
Uruguay	2
Brazil	1
April 18 - Ibadan
Japan	2
Mexico	0

Semi-finals
April 21 - Kaduna
Mali	1
Spain	3
April 21 - Lagos
Uruguay	1
Japan	2

Final
April 24 - Lagos
Spain	4
Japan	0
Third place
April 24 - Lagos
Mali	1
Uruguay	0

=== Round of 16 ===
14 April 1999
16:00

Republic of Ireland	1–1 (a.e.t.)	Nigeria
Sadlier 35'	(Report)	Ikedia 70'
Penalties
Crossley (penalty scored); Donnelly (penalty scored); Heary (penalty missed); Quinn (penalty scored)	3–5	(penalty scored) Ikedia; (penalty scored) Okunowo; (penalty scored) Aranka; (penalty scored) Dombraye; (penalty scored) Shittu

Sani Abacha Stadium, Kano
Attendance: 20,000
Referee: Lu Jun (China)

14 April 1999
16:00

Ghana	2–0	Costa Rica
Afriyie 18'; Ofori-Quaye 82'	(Report)

Ahmadou Bello Stadium, Kaduna
Attendance: 1,000
Referee: Arturo Dauden Ibáñez (Spain)

14 April 1999
19:00

Paraguay	2–2 (a.e.t.)	Uruguay
Santa Cruz 62' (pen.), 86'	(Report)	Chevantón 32'; Forlán 49'
Penalties
Santa Cruz (penalty scored); Maldonado (penalty scored); Escobar (penalty missed); Blanco (penalty scored); Da Silva (penalty scored); Florentín (penalty scored); Domínguez (penalty scored); Vera (penalty scored); Cuevas (penalty scored); Giménez (penalty scored); Santa Cruz (penalty missed)	9–10	(penalty scored) Canobbio; (penalty missed) Cardozo; (penalty scored) Pellegrín; (penalty scored) Carini; (penalty scored) Anchén; (penalty scored) Sorondo; (penalty scored) Correa; (penalty scored) Machado; (penalty scored) Carreño; (penalty scored) Carini; (penalty scored) Canobbio

National Stadium, Lagos
Attendance: 1,500
Referee: Felipe Ramos (Mexico)

14 April 1999
19:00

Brazil	4–0	Croatia
Ronaldinho 21' (pen.), 45'; Fernando Baiano 48' (pen.); Edu 68'	(Report)

U.J. Esuene Stadium, Calabar
Attendance: 12,000
Referee: Ahmad Nabil Ayad (Lebanon)

15 April 1999
16:00

Japan	1–1 (a.e.t.)	Portugal
Endo 48'	(Report)	Marco Claúdio 80'
Penalties
Ono (penalty scored); Nakata (penalty scored); Motoyama (penalty scored); Takahara (penalty scored); Sakai (penalty scored)	5–4	(penalty scored) Simão; (penalty scored) Marco Cláudio; (penalty scored) Sousa; (penalty missed) Costa; (penalty scored) Leal

Abubarkar Tafawa Balewa Stadium, Bauchi
Attendance: 8,000
Referee: Mohamed Guezzaz (Morocco)

15 April 1999
16:00

Spain	3–2	United States
Pablo 15', 32'; Xavi 19'	(Report)	Twellman 49', 90'

Liberation Stadium, Port Harcourt
Attendance: 15,600
Referee: Carlos Eugênio Simon (Brazil)

15 April 1999
19:00

Mexico	4–1	Argentina
Osorno 52'; E. Rodríguez 55'; J. Rodríguez 67'; L. González 88'	(Report)	Galletti 41'

Liberty Stadium, Ibadan
Attendance: 16,000
Referee: Siarhei Shmolik (Belarus)

15 April 1999
19:00

Mali	5–4 (a.e.t.)	Cameroon
Ndiaye 9'; Bagayoko 67'; Camara 83'; Dissa 90', 104'	(Report)	Komol 10', 74'; Mbami 23'; Kioyo 26'

Nnamdi Azikiwe Stadium, Enugu
Attendance: 4,000
Referee: Ángel Sánchez (Argentina)

=== Quarter-finals ===
18 April 1999
16:00

Uruguay	2–1	Brazil
Anchen 44'; Canobbio 86' (pen.)	(Report)	Fernando Baiano 27'

National Stadium, Lagos
Attendance: 10,000
Referee: Mourad Daami (Tunisia)

18 April 1999
16:00

Mali	3–1	Nigeria
Bagayoko 1', 72'; Diarra 44'	(Report)	Garba 17'

Nnamdi Azikiwe Stadium, Enugu
Attendance: 22,000
Referee: Sergei Shmolik (Belarus)

18 April 1999
19:00

Japan	2–0	Mexico
Motoyama 4'; Ono 24'	(Report)

Liberty Stadium, Ibadan
Attendance: 17,000
Referee: Claus Bo Larsen (Denmark)

18 April 1999
19:00

Spain	1–1 (a.e.t.)	Ghana
Barkero 54' (pen.)	(Report)	Ofori-Quaye 90'
Penalties
Xavi (penalty scored); Lombardero (penalty scored); Yeste (penalty scored); García (penalty missed); Jusué (penalty scored); Bermudo (penalty scored); Marchena (penalty scored); Orbaiz (penalty scored); Varela (penalty scored)	8–7	(penalty scored) Ansah; (penalty scored) Razak; (penalty scored) Appiah; (penalty scored) Amuzu; (penalty missed) Mohammed; (penalty scored) Gyan; (penalty scored) Abdul; (penalty scored) Ofori-Quaye; (penalty missed) Blay

Ahmadou Bello Stadium, Kaduna
Attendance: 19,000
Referee: William Mattus (Costa Rica)

=== Semi-finals ===
21 April 1999
16:00

Mali	1–3	Spain
Dissa 52'	(Report)	Varela 2', 26'; Xavi 90'

Ahmadou Bello Stadium, Kaduna
Attendance: 6,000
Referee: Lu Jun (China)

21 April 1999
19:00

Uruguay	1–2	Japan
Chevantón 24'	(Report)	Takahara 23'; Nagai 35'

National Stadium, Lagos
Attendance: 8,000
Referee: Simon Micallef (Australia)

=== Third place play-off ===
24 April 1999
14:00

Mali	1–0	Uruguay
Keita 30'	(Report)

National Stadium, Lagos
Attendance: 35,000
Referee: Željko Širić (Croatia)

=== Final ===
24 April 1999
17:00

Spain	4–0	Japan
Barkero 5'; Pablo 14', 30'; Gabri 51'	(Report)

National Stadium, Lagos
Attendance: 38,000
Referee: Ángel Sánchez (Argentina)

Spain	Japan

== Result ==
1999 FIFA World Youth Championship winners

Spain
First title

== Goalscorers ==
5 goals

- (Mali) Mahamadou Dissa
- (Spain) Pablo Couñago

4 goals

- (Cameroon) Gaspard Komol
- (Ghana) Peter Ofori-Quaye
- (Mali) Mamadou Bagayoko
- (United States) Taylor Twellman
- (Uruguay) Javier Chevantón

3 goals

- (Brazil) Fernando Baiano
- (Brazil) Edu
- (Brazil) Ronaldinho
- (Germany) Enrico Kern
- (Japan) Naohiro Takahara
- (Paraguay) Roque Santa Cruz
- (Spain) Gabri
- (Spain) Fernando Varela

2 goals

- (Cameroon) Francis Kioyo
- (Croatia) Zvonimir Deranja
- (Ghana) Baffour Gyan
- (Republic of Ireland) Damien Duff
- (Republic of Ireland) Richard Sadlier
- (Japan) Shinji Ono
- (Mali) Abdoulaye Camara
- (Mali) Tenema Ndiaye
- (Mexico) Luis González
- (Mexico) Rafael Márquez
- (Mexico) Daniel Osorno
- (Mexico) Juan Pablo Rodríguez
- (Nigeria) Hashimu Garba
- (Nigeria) Ganiyu Shittu
- (Portugal) Simão
- (South Korea) Seol Ki-Hyeon
- (Spain) José Barkero
- (Spain) Xavi
- (Zambia) Bernard Makufi

1 goal

- (Argentina) Esteban Cambiasso
- (Argentina) Luciano Galletti
- (Australia) Jason Culina
- (Australia) John Maisano
- (Australia) Mile Sterjovski
- (Brazil) Fábio Aurélio
- (Brazil) Rodrigo Gral
- (Brazil) Mancini
- (Brazil) Matuzalém
- (Cameroon) Modeste M'bami
- (Costa Rica) Alberto Brenes
- (Costa Rica) Mauricio Garita
- (Costa Rica) Allan Meléndez
- (Costa Rica) Esteban Santana
- (Croatia) Ivica Banović
- (Croatia) Saša Bjelanović
- (Croatia) Darko Miladin
- (Croatia) Silvester Sabolčki
- (Germany) Patrick Falk
- (Germany) Christian Timm
- (Ghana) Tutu Adu
- (Ghana) Owusu Afriyie
- (Honduras) Julio César de León
- (Honduras) Carlos Oliva
- (Honduras) Maynor Suazo
- (Republic of Ireland) Garry Crossley
- (Republic of Ireland) Colin Healy
- (Republic of Ireland) Stephen McPhail
- (Japan) Yasuhito Endō
- (Japan) Tatsuya Ishikawa
- (Japan) Masashi Motoyama
- (Japan) Yuichiro Nagai
- (Japan) Mitsuo Ogasawara
- (Kazakhstan) Yerlan Urazayev
- (Mali) Amadou Coulibaly
- (Mali) Mahamadou Diarra
- (Mali) Seydou Keita
- (Mexico) Eduardo Rodríguez
- (Nigeria) Julius Aghahowa
- (Nigeria) Pius Ikedia
- (Paraguay) Nelson Cuevas
- (Paraguay) Sergio Fernández
- (Paraguay) Rubén Maldonado
- (Paraguay) Nelson Vera
- (Portugal) Marco Claúdio
- (Portugal) Paulo Costa
- (Portugal) Ricardo Sousa
- (Saudi Arabia) Saleh Al-Saqri
- (Saudi Arabia) Mohamad Dabo
- (South Korea) Kim Kun-Hyung
- (South Korea) Lee Dong-Gook
- (South Korea) Na Hee-Keun
- (Spain) Rubén Suárez
- (United States) Carlos Bocanegra
- (United States) Danny Califf
- (United States) Ryan Futagaki
- (Uruguay) Jorge Anchen
- (Uruguay) Fabián Canobbio
- (Uruguay) Diego Forlán
- (Zambia) Japhet Makayi
- (Zambia) Ronald Mbambara
- (Zambia) Andrew Sinkala

== Awards ==
Golden Shoe	Golden Ball	FIFA Fair Play Award
(Spain) Pablo Couñago	(Mali) Seydou Keita	Croatia

== Final ranking ==
Pos	Team	Pld	W	D	L	GF	GA	GD	Pts	Final result
1	Spain	7	5	2	0	16	5	+11	17	Champions
2	Japan	7	4	1	2	11	9	+2	13	Runners-up
3	Mali	7	5	0	2	16	14	+2	15	Third place
4	Uruguay	7	2	2	3	7	8	−1	8	Fourth place
5	Ghana	5	3	2	0	8	2	+6	11	Eliminated in Quarter-finals
6	Mexico	5	3	1	1	9	5	+4	10	Eliminated in Quarter-finals
7	Brazil	5	3	0	2	13	5	+8	9	Eliminated in Quarter-finals
8	Nigeria	5	1	2	2	6	7	−1	5	Eliminated in Quarter-finals
9	Republic of Ireland	4	2	1	1	7	2	+5	7	Eliminated in Round of 16
10	Paraguay	4	2	1	1	7	8	−1	7	Eliminated in Round of 16
11	United States	4	2	0	2	7	7	0	6	Eliminated in Round of 16
12	Cameroon	4	2	0	2	8	9	−1	6	Eliminated in Round of 16
13	Portugal	4	1	2	1	5	4	+1	5	Eliminated in Round of 16
14	Croatia	4	1	2	1	6	6	0	5	Eliminated in Round of 16
15	Costa Rica	4	1	1	2	4	7	−3	4	Eliminated in Round of 16
16	Argentina	4	1	1	2	2	5	−3	4	Eliminated in Round of 16
17	Zambia	3	1	1	1	5	8	−3	4	Eliminated in Group stage
18	Germany	3	1	0	2	5	4	+1	3	Eliminated in Group stage
19	South Korea	3	1	0	2	5	6	−1	3	Eliminated in Group stage
20	Australia	3	1	0	2	4	8	−4	3	Eliminated in Group stage
21	Saudi Arabia	3	0	1	2	2	6	−4	1	Eliminated in Group stage
22	England	3	0	0	3	0	4	−4	0	Eliminated in Group stage
23	Honduras	3	0	0	3	4	10	−6	0	Eliminated in Group stage
24	Kazakhstan	3	0	0	3	1	9	−8	0	Eliminated in Group stage

Source: rsssf.com
