= Maisano =

Maisano is a surname. Notable people with this surname include:

- Gianfranco Michele Maisano (born 1944), Italian singer and actor, known as Michele
- John Maisano (born 1979), Australian-born former professional footballer and current football coach in the National Premier Leagues (NPL)
