= Keith Doyle =

Keith Doyle may refer to:

- Keith Doyle (footballer) (born 1979), Irish former football player
- Keith Doyle (politician) (1924–2017), Australian politician
