= Chikelue Iloenyosi =

Nigerian footballer

Personal information
- Full name: Chikelue Iloenyosi
- Date of birth: 13 October 1980 (age 46)
- Place of birth: Enugu, Nigeria
- Height: 1.85 m (6 ft 1 in)
- Position: Defender

Senior career*
Years	Team	Apps	(Gls)
1999–2000	Fenerbahçe S.K. A2	35	(7)
2000–2001	Tennis Borussia Berlin	1	(1)
2001–2002	Çaykur Rizespor	7	(0)
2001–2003	Ittihad FC		
2003–2005	Asteras Tripoli		
2005	Sydney Olympic	0	(0)
2005–2006	Al-Ittihad Club		

International career
2000	Nigeria	4	(0)
- * Club domestic league appearances and goals

Chikelue Iloenyosi // popularly referred to as D'General(born 13 October 1980) is a Nigerian international footballer who played as a defender.

== Career ==
Iloenyosi has played professionally for Nipost Football Club Enugu, Calabar Rovers, Udoji United, Enugu Rangers, El-kanemi warriors of Maiduguri, Iwuanyanwu Nationel F.C Owerri, Fenerbahçe S.K., Tennis Borussia Berlin, Çaykur Rizespor, Ittihad FC, Asteras Tripolis and Al-Ittihad Club.

Iloenyosi featured in the Nigeria national under-20 football team at the 1999 FIFA World Youth Championship. He earned fifteen (15) senior caps for Nigeria in 2000 and he was part of the Olympic team 2000 in Sydney.

In May 2011, Iloenyosi was banned by the Nigeria Football Federation (NFF) for participating in the rival Nigeria Football Association (NFA), because of his commitment to improve football development in Nigeria. Both organizations later came to an agreement after FIFA sent a letter to clear him from the ban list.

He is one of the founders and president of 042 Football Legends Association in Nigeria, a charity organization that helps and supports ex-footballers, the families of late footballers and runs mentorship programs for young players. The association has paid the hospital bills of many footballers with health challenges and currently sponsors 45 children of ex-footballers in secondary schools within the country. Iloenyosi is the Senior Special Advisor to NNF President Amaju Melvin Pinnick and also Technical Advisor to NNL Chairman.

== Personal life ==
His marriage to actress Stephanie Okereke (2004–2007) was declared null and void by the high court in Lagos in 2012 because at the time they got married, Iloenyosi was already legally married to another woman in the United States.

Iloenyosi is currently married to Oluyemisi Ojo and has three children.
