= FC Ikva Mlyniv =

FC Ikva Mlyniv is an amateur Ukrainian football club from Mlyniv, Rivne Oblast. The club is named after the local river.

The club plays at the local "Kolos" stadium, which also is used seldomly by Veres Rivne.

== History ==
For the first time FC Ikva appeared in national competition in 1991 when Ukraine was still part of the Soviet Union. The club was playing in the republican level competitions among "collectives of physical culture", the Soviet form of amateur-type teams. Ikva placed 10th among 16 participants in its group.

The club reappeared again in 2002.

=== Professional period ===
In 2003 Ikva Mlyniv was admitted to the Ukrainian Second League and participated in the 2003–04 Ukrainian Second League season. Previously participated in the national amateur league competitions, they were admitted to professional league in place of another Volyn farm team Kovel-Volyn-2 that competed in the 2002-03 Ukrainian Second League. Many players, who played for Kovel that withdrew, signed up for the new team. Ikva Mlyniv played their first Round 1 match of the season on 26 July 2003 at home against Tekhno-Tsentr Rohatyn, but were defeated 0:1 with an early goal in first have. Their first win came about in Round 3 when Ikva were hosting the Obolon Kyiv second team (Obolon-2). At their home grounds "Kolos" Ikva was victorious 3:0 with a goal from Ohnyev and a brace from Voznyuk. The club finished the first half of the season at the 11 place among 16 participants with 4 wins after 15 games played and 6 losses. The last game of the first half they played on 8 November 2003 away in Lviv against the Karpaty reserve team (Halychyna-Karpaty) tying them at 1 at the SKA stadium. Leading for most of the match, they conceded in less than 10 minutes to spare and failing to secure the 3-points win.

Already in February 2004, a local media such as "Rivne Vechirnye" wrote that there is a concern about the future of the Mlyniv football team. It was acknowledging the Ikva is a farm team of Volyn Lutsk from neighboring oblast. During the winter break, all of the Rivne footballers who played for the team returned to Rivne and were preparing to the season either in Veres or in ODEK Orzhiv (another football club in Rivne Oblast).

Volyn Lutsk petitioned to the Professional Football League of Ukraine to rename the team into Volyn-2 and allow it to play at "Pidshypnyk" stadium in Lutsk. The honorary president of the club was Anatoliy Yukhymenko who served the deputy chairman of the Rivne Oblast State administration (ODA). By March 2004, the situation with the Mlyniv football team improved following the intervention of Volyn Lutsk and Ikva Mlyniv participated in the season's spring preparation during their trip to Zakarpattia Oblast.

Ikva resumed the 2003–04 season on 28 March 2004 with home game against the Karpaty reserve, Halychyna-Karpaty, and lost it 0:1, while playing a man up for over half an hour. The winning goal was scored by one of the Baranets brothers, Hryhoriy, on 21st minute. Ikva finished that season on the second from the bottom place, 15th, with 6 wins and 14 losses. Their last game took place in Rohatyn on 20 June 2004 against Tekhno-Tsentr. The first half of the match ended in 0:0. In the second half Ikva managed to score equalizer in less than 10 minutes after conceding a goal. With 10 minutes left in the game, one of the Mlyniv's players were ejected and the match ended in 1:1 draw. After the season FC Volyn gave up supporting the club and the professional team was dissolved.

After withdrawal of Ikva in 2004 and until 2020 there were no other club representing Volyn and Rivne regions in the Second League except for Veres Rivne.

=== Clubs situation after 2010 ===
As Viliya, the club played in the 2018–19 Rivne Oblast Championship.

== Players ==
The club became a "steppingstone" for such players like Volodymyr Homenyuk, Oleh Herasymyuk, Nigerian forward Eddy Lord Dombraye, Serbian midfielder Uroš Milosavljević, and Cameroonian forward Ernest Emako-Siankam. The Mlyniv team also featured such Ukrainian international players like Mykola Volosyanko.

Top 5 players with the most games at professional level
Name	Season	Came from	Games played	Left for
Andriy Yaremchuk	2003–04	Kovel-Volyn-2	26	Podillya Khemlnytskyi
Roman Ohnyev	2003–04	Kovel-Volyn-2	18	Volyn Lutsk
Oleh Kravchuk	2003–04	Kovel-Volyn-2	16	Volyn Lutsk
Serhiy Voznyuk	2002–03	Veres Rivne	15	Veres Rivne
Vitaliy Sydorov	2002–03	Kovel-Volyn-2	15	Veres Rivne
Yevhen Timush	2003–04	Kovel-Volyn-2	15	Volyn Lutsk

== Coaches ==
- 2003 Mykola Volkov
- 2004 Anatoliy Yots

== League and cup history ==
Season	Div.	Pos.	Pl.	W	D	L	GS	GA	P	Domestic Cup	Europe	Notes
