= Abdou Traoré (footballer, born 1981) =

Malian footballer (born 1981)

Personal information
- Date of birth: 5 August 1981 (age 45)
- Place of birth: Bamako, Mali
- Position: Defender

Senior career*
Years	Team	Apps	(Gls)
1993–1999	Centre Salif Keita		
1999–2005	Djoliba		(17)
2006–2007	Al Jazira Club		
2008–2009	Africa Sports d'Abidjan		
2010	AS Denguélé		

International career
1999	Mali U20	7	(0)
2001–2004	Mali	2	(0)
- * Club domestic league appearances and goals

Abdou Traoré (born 5 August 1981) is a Malian former footballer who played as a defender.

== International career ==
Traoré was part of the Mali U20 national team at the 1999 FIFA World Youth Championship, finishing top of group D, losing to champion Spain in the semi-final and winning against Uruguay in the match for third place.

He was part of the senior national team at the 2004 Summer Olympics, which exited in the quarter-finals, finishing top of group A, before losing to Italy in the next round.

== Honors and awards ==
- FIFA World Youth Championship third place: 1999
