= Emmanuel Zulu =

Zambian footballer (born 1981)

Personal information
- Full name: Emmanuel Zulu
- Date of birth: January 3, 1981 (age 45)
- Place of birth: Zambia
- Position: Midfielder

Senior career*
Years	Team	Apps	(Gls)
1999–2001	Zanaco		
2001–2003	Supersport United		
2004–2005	Nkwazi		
2005–2006	Polonia Warsaw		
2006–2007	Perak FA		

International career
2000–2002	Zambia	5	(0)
- * Club domestic league appearances and goals

Emmanuel Zulu (born 3 January 1981) is a Zambian footballer.

== International competition ==
Zulu represented Zambia at the 1999 FIFA World Youth Championship as well as at senior level in 2002 FIFA World Cup Qualifiers against Togo and Botswana.

== Professional competition ==
Zulu played from 2002 to 2003 with Perak FA of the Malaysian Super League but was released prior to the 2007 season. He has also played professionally with Supersport United FC in South Africa but had his contract terminated "mainly for excessive beer drinking and indiscipline".
