= Ernest Emako-Siankam =

Cameroonian footballer

Personal information
- Full name: Ernest Emako-Siankam
- Date of birth: 21 February 1981 (age 45)
- Place of birth: Bafoussam, Cameroon
- Height: 1.88 m (6 ft 2 in)
- Position: Striker

Senior career*
Years	Team	Apps	(Gls)
1998–2000	Racing Bafoussam		
2000–2001	Hajduk Split	0	(0)
2002–2005	Volyn Lutsk	40	(4)
2002–2003	→ Kovel-Volyn 2 (loan)	1	(0)
2003–2004	→ Ikva Mlyniv (loan)	2	(1)
2005	→ Gänclärbirliyi Sumqayit (loan)	6	(0)
2005–2006	Nîmes Olympique	2	(0)
2006	Chengdu Blades	11	(2)
2007	Persita Tangerang	23	(8)
2008	Chongqing Lifan	5	(0)
2010–2011	Churchill Brothers		
- * Club domestic league appearances and goals

Ernest Emako Siankam (born 21 February 1981) is a Cameroonian former footballer who plays as a forward.

Emako Siankam previously spent three seasons playing for FC Volyn Lutsk in the Ukrainian Premier League.
