= Marco Maisano =

Australian soccer player (born 1981)

Personal information
- Full name: Marco Miguel Maisano
- Date of birth: 15 February 1981 (age 45)
- Place of birth: Argentina
- Position: Midfielder

Senior career*
Years	Team	Apps	(Gls)
1998–2000	FC Eindhoven		
2001–2005	Greenock Morton	84	(5)
2005	Frankston Pines	9	(2)
2006	Melbourne Knights	14	(1)
- * Club domestic league appearances and goals

Marco Maisano (born 15 February 1981) is an Australian former soccer player who played as a midfielder.

== Early life ==
Maisano was born in Haedo, Argentina to Argentine parents.

He arrived in Europe at the age of seventeen.

== Career ==
In 1998, Maisano signed for Dutch side FC Eindhoven. In 2001, he signed for Scottish side Greenock Morton with his brother. They were described as "two of the more significant figures in the club... the star boys... its heart and soul". In 2005, he signed for Australian side Frankston Pines. In 2006, he signed for Australian side Melbourne Knights.

== Style of play ==
Maisano mainly operated as a midfielder. He has been described as "earned a reputation as something of a hard man... in his more defensive, ball-winning role in central midfield".

== Personal life ==
Maisano is the brother of Australian soccer player John Maisano. After retiring from professional football, he founded college sports recruitment company NSR Australia in 2006. He became a millionaire and has contributed over one million dollars to soccer sponsorship.
