= Perry Mutapa =

Zambian footballer (born 1979)

Perry Mutapa (born 18 November 1979 in Lusaka) is a Zambian football midfielder.

He was part of the Zambian 2000 African Nations Cup team, who finished third in group C in the first round of competition, thus failing to secure qualification for the quarter-finals. He also took part at the 1999 FIFA World Youth Championship.

== Clubs ==
- 1997-1999: (Zambia) Zanaco FC
- 1999-2000: (Portugal) SC Farense
- 2003-2004: (Zambia) Nkwazi FC
- 2004–2006: (South Africa) Orlando Pirates FC
- 2006–2008: (South Africa) FC AK
