= Fernando Albermager =

Uruguayan footballer (born 1979)

Personal information
- Full name: Fernando Adrian Albermager
- Date of birth: 19 January 1979 (age 47)
- Place of birth: Uruguay
- Position: Defender

Senior career*
Years	Team	Apps	(Gls)
-2000	Peñarol		
2001-2002	Club Plaza Colonia de Deportes		
2003	Sud América		
2004	Salto F.C.		
2005-2006	Basáñez		
- * Club domestic league appearances and goals

Fernando Albermager (born 19 January 1979 in Uruguay) is a Uruguayan retired footballer.
