= Abdoulaye Camara (footballer, born 1980) =

Malian international footballer

Personal information
- Full name: Abdoulaye Camara
- Date of birth: 2 January 1980 (age 46)
- Place of birth: Bamako, Mali
- Height: 1.83 m (6 ft 0 in)
- Position: Defender

Senior career*
Years	Team	Apps	(Gls)
1996–1997	Onze Créateurs		
1998–1999	Koper	5	(0)
1999–2000	Udinese	2	(0)
2000–2001	Cercle Brugge	26	(2)
2001–2002	Castel di Sangro	8	(0)
2002–2003	La Louvière	0	(0)
2003–2005	Grenoble	4	(0)
2007–2008	Thanda Royal Zulu	0	(0)
2008–2009	FC AK		
2009–2010	Butcherfille Rovers Durban		
2010–2013	Échirolles		

International career^{‡}
1995–1997	Mali U17		
1999	Mali U20		
2002–2008	Mali	9	(0)
- * Club domestic league appearances and goals as of 5 November 2009 ‡ National team caps and goals as of 19 April 2011

Abdoulaye Camara (born 2 January 1980) is a Malian former professional footballer who played as a defender. He made 9 appearances for the Mali national team from 2002 to 2008.

== Club career ==
After initially playing with Onze Créateurs de Niaréla in Mali, he joined Slovenian club FC Koper in 1997. After one season he moved to Italy to play with Udinese Calcio in the Serie A. After two seasons he moved to Belgium signing with Cercle Brugge, but after at the end of the season he returned to Italy to play with Castel di Sangro Calcio. In 2002, La Louvière brought him for one season, and in summer 2003 he signed with Ligue 2 club Grenoble. By 2007 he was in South Africa playing with top league Thanda Royal Zulu. In 2008, he moved to FC AK before joining Butcherfille Rovers Durban in 2009.

== International career ==
Since 1998 he has been called to represent the Mali national team having 9 caps since his debut in 2002. He had represented Mali at youth levels first at 1995 FIFA U-17 World Championship, and next in 1997 FIFA U-17 World Championship held in Egypt, where they reached the quarter-finals. He also participated in the FIFA Under-20 World Cup held in Nigeria, where they reach the third place.
