= Álex Lombardero =

Spanish footballer

Personal information
- Full name: Alejandro Lombardero Menéndez
- Date of birth: 1 March 1979 (age 47)
- Place of birth: Arteixo, Spain
- Height: 1.70 m (5 ft 7 in)
- Position: Midfielder

Youth career
- Sporting Gijón
- Lugo

Senior career*
Years	Team	Apps	(Gls)
1997–1999	Lugo	57	(7)
1999–2000	CP Mérida	26	(3)
2000–2001	Mérida UD	6	(0)
2001	Atlético Madrid B	11	(0)
2001–2002	Ceuta	22	(0)
2002–2003	Díter Zafra	31	(3)
2003–2004	Racing Santander B	34	(5)
2004–2005	Alavés B	13	(1)
2004	Alavés	2	(0)
2005–2008	Gramenet	41	(6)
Total		243	(25)

International career
1995–1998	Spain U18	10	(3)
1998–1999	Spain U20	8	(0)
1999	Spain U21	1	(0)
Medal record
Representing Spain
Men's football
FIFA World Youth Championship
Winner	1999 Nigeria
- * Club domestic league appearances and goals

Alejandro 'Álex' Lombardero Menéndez (born 1 March 1979 in Arteixo, Galicia) is a Spanish former professional footballer who played as a midfielder.

== Honours ==
Spain U20

- FIFA World Youth Championship: 1999
