= Silvestar Sabolčki =

Croatian footballer (1979–2003)

Personal information
- Date of birth: 12 November 1979
- Place of birth: Varaždin, SR Croatia, SFR Yugoslavia
- Date of death: 30 May 2003 (aged 23)
- Place of death: Varaždin, Croatia
- Height: 1.76 m (5 ft 9 1/2 in)
- Position: Winger

Youth career
- Varteks

Senior career*
Years	Team	Apps	(Gls)
1998–2003	Varteks	121	(11)
2003	Dinamo Zagreb	0	(0)

International career^{‡}
1999	Croatia U20	1	(0)
1998–2001	Croatia U21	17	(1)
2001–2003	Croatia	2	(0)
- * Club domestic league appearances and goals as of 21:28, 27 October 2009 (UTC) ‡ National team caps and goals as of 21:28, 27 October 2009 (UTC)

Silvestar Sabolčki (Croatian pronunciation: [sǐlʋestar sabǒltʃki]; 12 November 1979 – 30 May 2003) was a Croatian footballer who played as a winger.

Playing for NK Varteks, Sabolčki established himself as one of the most talented Croatian footballers of his generation and signed a contract with the country's top club Dinamo Zagreb less than a week prior to his death in a road accident in the early morning of 30 May 2003.

== Club career ==
Sabolčki rose through the youth ranks of Varteks before penning his first professional contract at the club in 1998, at the age of 18. He quickly established himself as a first-team regular at the club, appearing in a total of 121 matches and scoring 11 goals in the Prva HNL over the following five seasons. In the 1998–99 season, he helped the club reaching the quarter-finals of the UEFA Cup Winners' Cup, and was also an important member of the squad that reached the 2001–02 Croatian Cup final. He also made some UEFA Cup appearances with the club.

At the time of his death, he had already signed a contract with Croatian top club Dinamo Zagreb and was about to join the club at the beginning of the 2003–04 season.

== International career ==
Between 1998 and 2001, Sabolčki was a regular with the Croatian national under-21 football team, winning a total of 18 international caps with the team. He was also part of the Croatian squad at the 1999 FIFA World Youth Championship, where he scored his only international goal in a 5–1 victory over Kazakhstan in the group stage. The following year, he also played for Croatia at the 2000 UEFA European Under-21 Championship.

Sabolčki also won two full international caps for Croatia, making his debut on 25 April 2001 in a friendly match against Greece in Varaždin, coming on as a substitute for Robert Jarni in the second half. His second appearance came against Macedonia in another international friendly in February 2003.

== Death ==
At the age of 23, Sabolčki was killed in a road accident that occurred in a Varaždin suburb in the early morning of 30 May 2003, when he lost control over his Audi A3 at high speed. The vehicle hit a light pole and several traffic signs before being torn apart by the force of the impact upon hitting a second light pole.

Sabolčki and two other passengers, 20-year-old Kristijan Kitner and 24-year-old Krunoslav Sabolić, were ejected from the vehicle and pronounced dead at the scene. Kitner and Sabolić were also professional footballers, both goalkeepers. Kitner was in his first professional season with Varteks, while Sabolić had left Varteks for Slaven Belupo a few years earlier.
