= Sam Okoye =

Nigerian footballer

Personal information
- Full name: Samuel Okoye
- Date of birth: 1 May 1980
- Place of birth: Lagos, Nigeria
- Date of death: 31 August 2005 (aged 25)
- Place of death: Tehran, Iran
- Position: Goalkeeper

Senior career*
Years	Team	Apps	(Gls)
1998–2004	Enugu Rangers		
2004–2005	Enyimba		
2005	Sorkhpooshan		

International career
1999	Nigeria U19		
2003	Nigeria		
- * Club domestic league appearances and goals

Sam Okoye (1 May 1980 – 31 August 2005) was a Nigerian football goalkeeper who represented Nigeria during the 1999 FIFA World Youth Championship.

== Death ==
Four months after his 25th birthday, whilst living in Tehran, he reportedly died there after a few days illness. The cause and circumstances of his death have not been adequately elucidated and Iranian authorities did not release his remains for repatriation and burial in Nigeria until May 2006. The duo of Daniel Olerum and Sunny Okoye disclosed from the Iranian capital, Tehran that officials of Sorkh Poushan FC have agreed to foot the flight bills of the late footballer.
