= Aminu Sani =

Nigerian footballer

Personal information
- Date of birth: 14 May 1980 (age 46)
- Place of birth: Lagos, Nigeria
- Height: 1.71 m (5 ft 7 1/2 in)
- Positions: Central midfielder; left midfielder

Senior career*
Years	Team	Apps	(Gls)
- Katsina City Rolers
1996–1997	Katsina United		
1997–1998	Atalanta		
1999–2003	Club Brugge	8	(0)
2002–2003	FC Brussels	6	(1)
2003–2004	Hapoel Beer Sheva		
2004–2006	Giulianova Calcio		
2006–2008	Alghero Calcio		
2008–2009	Radnički Kragujevac		

International career
1999	Nigeria U-20		
- * Club domestic league appearances and goals

Aminu Sani (born 14 May 1980 in Lagos) is a Nigerian professional football player.

== Club career ==
Sani started playing professionally in Katsina United, but soon, at 17 years, he went to Italy and signed with Atalanta Bergamo. After one season, he signed with top Belgian club Club Brugge where he stayed until 2003. In the last season he was loaned, in the last half of the season, to FC Brussels, known in that period by the name of KFC Strombeek. In summer 2003, he moved to Israel to play in Hapoel Be'er Sheva. A series of injuries made him almost give up, but in December 2006, he signed with a lower Italian league side Alghero Calcio, where he expected to return to his maximum form. In 2008, he moved to Serbia to play in FK Radnički Kragujevac.

== International career ==
He was part of the Nigeria national under-20 football team in 1999.

== Honours ==
Club Brugge

- Belgian Cup: 2001–02
- Belgian Super Cup: 2002

== External sources ==
- Aminu Sani at Club Brugge official website
- Profile in As
- Player profile in official Club Brugge website
- Profile at Srbijafudbal
- Signing with italian side Alghero
