= Marco Claúdio =

Portuguese footballer

Personal information
- Full name: Marco Claúdio Cardoso Lourenço
- Date of birth: 5 May 1979 (age 47)
- Place of birth: Lisbon, Portugal
- Height: 1.76 m (5 ft 9 in)
- Position: Midfielder

Youth career
- 1989–1994: Sacavenense
- 1994–1995: Benfica
- 1995–1996: Alverca
- 1996–1997: Benfica

Senior career*
| Years | Team | Apps | (Gls) |
| 1997–1998 | SL Olivais | | |
| 1998–1999 | União Montemor | 28 | (8) |
| 1999–2002 | Salgueiros | 52 | (4) |
| 2002–2003 | Chaves | 15 | (0) |
| 2003–2005 | Espinho | 67 | (18) |
| 2005–2006 | Feirense | 21 | (1) |
| 2006–2009 | Varzim | 74 | (6) |
| 2009–2010 | Freamunde | 25 | (4) |
| 2010–2011 | Aves | 18 | (1) |
| 2011–2013 | Rio Tinto | 28 | (3) |
| Total | | 328 | (45) |

International career
| 1999 | Portugal U20 | 7 | (1) |
- * Club domestic league appearances and goals

Marco Claúdio Cardoso Lourenço (born 5 May 1979), known as Marco Cláudio, is a Portuguese former footballer who played as a central midfielder.

== Club career ==
Born in Lisbon, Marco Cláudio appeared in 52 Primeira Liga matches over three seasons, scoring four goals for S.C. Salgueiros. He spent most of his 16-year senior career in the Segunda Liga, netting 20 times from 185 appearances for a host of clubs.

Marco Cláudio retired in 2013 at the age of 36, after two years in amateur football with SC Rio Tinto.

== International career ==
Marco Cláudio was part of the Portugal squad at the 1999 FIFA World Youth Championship held in Nigeria. He scored in the 1–1 draw against Japan in the round of 16, in a penalty shootout loss where he converted his attempt.
