= Thierry Modo Abouna =

Cameroonian footballer (born 1981)

Personal information
- Full name: Thierry Bernardi Modo Abouna
- Date of birth: May 20, 1981 (age 45)
- Place of birth: Yaoundé, Cameroon
- Height: 1.70 m (5 ft 7 in)
- Position: Striker

Youth career
- 1996–1997: Olympique Mvolyé

Senior career*
Years	Team	Apps	(Gls)
1997–1999	Canon Yaoundé		
1999–2000	Tonnerre Yaoundé		
2001	Bahlinger SC		
2002	Tonnerre Yaoundé		
2002–2004	RCD Mallorca		
2004–2007	AEL		
2007–2010	Villemomble Sports		

International career
1999	Cameroon U-20	3	(0)
- * Club domestic league appearances and goals

Thierry Bernardi Modo Abouna (born May 20, 1981, in Yaoundé, Cameroon) is a retired Cameroonian soccer player.

He played in various countries throughout his career, including for RCD Mallorca of Spain, AEL of Greece, Bahlinger SC of Germany and Villemomble Sports of France.

He played for the Cameroon national football team U-20 appearing in the 1999 FIFA U-20 World Cup.
