= Eddy Lord Dombraye =

Nigerian professional football Manager and Player

Eddy Dombraye
Personal information
- Full name: Eddy Lord Dombraye
- Date of birth: 11 November 1979 (age 46)
- Place of birth: Port Harcourt, Nigeria
- Height: 1.84 m (6 ft 1/2 in)
- Position: Forward

Senior career*
Years	Team	Apps	(Gls)
1995	Premier Breweries		
1996	Iwuanyanwu Nationale		
1997	Bendel Insurance	12	(4)
1998	Iwuanyanwu Nationale	21	(11)
1998–2001	ŁKS Łódź	21	(2)
2000–2002	Stomil Olsztyn	7	(0)
2002–2003	OFK Beograd		
2003–2005	Volyn Lutsk	20	(0)
2004	→ Ikva Mlyniv (loan)	3	(1)
2005–2009	Zakarpattia Uzhhorod	54	(6)
2008	→ Fenix-Illichovets (loan)		

International career
1999	Nigeria U20	4	(0)
1998	Nigeria	1	(0)

Managerial career
- 2021–2022: Lobi Stars
- * Club domestic league appearances and goals

Eddy Lord Dombraye (born 11 November 1979) is a Nigerian professional football manager and former player.

== Career ==
After playing in Nigeria with Premier Breweries, Iwuanyanwu Nationale and Bendel Insurance, he moved to Poland in 1998 to play with Ekstraklasa club ŁKS Łódź. After playing with Stomil Olsztyn, he moved to FR Yugoslavia in 2002 to play with OFK Beograd. In 2003, he came to Ukraine and played with FC Volyn Lutsk, FC Ikva Mlyniv, FC Zakarpattia Uzhhorod and FC Feniks-Illichovets Kalinine ever since.

Dombraye played for Nigeria at the 1999 FIFA World Youth Championship finals in Nigeria. Before that he debuted for the Nigerian main national team entering as a substitute in a 1998 African Cup of Nations qualification game against Burkina Faso.

He was sacked by the management of Lobi Stars on 21 March 2022 following his poor performance since the start of the 2021–22 NPFL season.

== Honours ==
Nigeria U20

- FIFA World Youth Championship quarter-finalist: 1999

== External sources ==
- Eddy Lord Dombraye at 90minut.pl (in Polish)
- Eddy Lord Dombraye at WorldFootball.net
- Eddy Lord Dombraye at UAF (in Ukrainian)
