= Bernard Makufi =

Zambian footballer (born 1979)

Personal information
- Date of birth: 6 January 1979 (age 47)
- Position: Forward

Senior career*
Years	Team	Apps	(Gls)
1998–1999	Nkana F.C.		
1999–2000	IFK Hässleholm		

International career
1999–2000	Zambia	9	(1)
- * Club domestic league appearances and goals

Bernard Makufi (born 6 January 1979) is a Zambian retired football striker. He was a squad member at the 2000 African Cup of Nations.
