= Keith Doyle (footballer) =

Irish former footballer

Personal information
- Full name: Keith Doyle
- Date of birth: 20 July 1979 (age 47)
- Place of birth: Dublin, Ireland
- Position: Right back

Youth career
- Swords Celtic

Senior career*
Years	Team	Apps	(Gls)
1997–2001	St Patrick's Athletic	88	(0)
2001–2002	Athlone Town	22	(1)
2002	Bray Wanderers	5	(0)
2002–2005	Shamrock Rovers	73	(0)
2006	Dublin City	0	(0)
2006	UCD	10	(0)

International career
1997–1998	Republic of Ireland U18		
- * Club domestic league appearances and goals

Keith Doyle (born 20 July 1979) is an Irish former footballer.

A full back Keith joined Shamrock Rovers from Bray Wanderers in May 2002 where he stayed until the end of the 2005 season when Rovers got relegated. He made a total of 93 appearances scoring once . These included 3 appearances in European competition during his time with the Hoops.

He started his career at Swords Celtic before moving to St Patrick's Athletic and was one of the players to win the European Under-18 Championship in 1998 under Brian Kerr.

== Honours ==
Republic of Ireland

- UEFA European Under-18 Football Championship (1): 1998

St Patrick's Athletic

- League of Ireland (2): 1997-98, 1998-99
- Leinster Senior Cup (1): 1999-2000
