= Mahamadou Dissa =

Malian footballer

Personal information
- Date of birth: 18 May 1979 (age 47)
- Place of birth: Kayes, Mali
- Height: 1.73 m (5 ft 8 in)
- Position: Centre-forward

Senior career*
Years	Team	Apps	(Gls)
1997–2000	Centre Salif Keita		
2000–2002	Chamois Niortais	50	(17)
2002–2003	Grenoble	32	(2)
2004–2005	Brest	43	(7)
2005–2007	Beveren	63	(21)
2007–2011	Roeselare	120	(39)
2011–2013	K.V. Oostende	65	(16)
2013–2014	Geants Athois		
2014–2015	KFC Izegem		
2015–2016	Royale Entente Sportive Acrenoise		
Total		373	(92)

International career
1999–2008	Mali	22	(3)
- * Club domestic league appearances and goals

Mahamadou Dissa (born 18 May 1979) is a retired Malian footballer who played as a centre-forward. He played for the Mali national team.

Scores and results list Mali's goal tally first, score column indicates score after each Dissa goal.

List of international goals scored by Mahamadou Dissa
No.	Date	Venue	Opponent	Score	Result	Competition	Ref.
1	23 April 2000	Stade Modibo Kéïta, Bamako, Mali	Libya	3–1	3–1	2002 FIFA World Cup qualification	
2	12 June 2005	Stade Fernand-Fournier, Arles, France	Algeria	2–0	3–0	Friendly	
3	12 June 2005	Stade Fernand-Fournier, Arles, France	Algeria	3–0	3–0	Friendly	
