= Hashimu Garba =

Nigerian footballer (born 1980)

Personal information
- Full name: Mast Hashimu Garba
- Date of birth: 14 April 1980 (age 46)
- Place of birth: Bauchi, Nigeria
- Height: 1.78 m (5 ft 10 in)
- Position: Forward

Senior career*
Years	Team	Apps	(Gls)
	Padova	0	(0)
1998–2000	Chievo	3	(0)
2000–2001	Pistoiese	4	(1)
2001	→ FC Winterthur (loan)	14	(5)
2002	Martina	13	(1)
2002–2003	Imolese	19	(3)
2003–2005	Fano	53	(16)
2005	Latina	17	(4)
2006	SPAL	18	(3)
2007–2008	Sansovino	29	(8)
- Copparese
- Porto Viro

International career
- Nigeria U20
- * Club domestic league appearances and goals

Mast Hashimu Garba (born 14 April 1980) is a Nigerian former professional footballer who played as a forward. He spent most of his career in Italy

== Playing career ==
In 1997, Garba signed for Italian second division side Padova, but left after the president cast lots to decide who to release, between him and fellow Nigerian Mohammed Aliyu Datti, due to Padova having already filled their quota of non-EU players.

In 1998, Garba signed for A.C. ChievoVerona in the Italian second division, where he made three league appearances.

He competed for Nigeria at the 1999 FIFA World Youth Championship.

In 2000, Garba signed for Italian second division club Pistoiese, where he made four league appearances and scored one goal.

Before the second half of the 2000–01 season, Garba was sent on loan to Winterthur in Switzerland, where he made 14 league appearances and scored five goals.

Before the second half of the 2001–02 season, he signed for Italian third division team Martina.

In 2008, Garba signed for Copparese in the Italian lower leagues.

== Post-playing career ==
In 2019, Garba was appointed team manager of Nigerian outfit Wikki Tourists.
