= Rubén Maldonado =

Paraguayan footballer (born 1979)

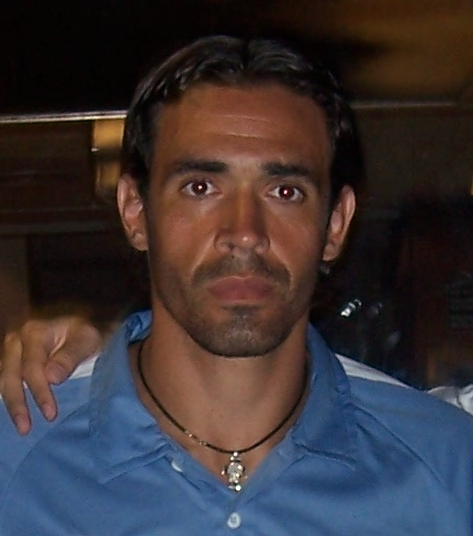

Personal information
- Full name: Rubén Dario Maldonado Brizuela
- Date of birth: 29 April 1979 (age 47)
- Place of birth: Asunción, Paraguay
- Height: 1.80 m (5 ft 11 in)
- Position: Central defender

Team information
- Current team: Nacional
- Number: 29

Senior career*
Years	Team	Apps	(Gls)
1997–1999	Olimpia	64	(10)
2000–2005	Venezia	94	(6)
2001–2002	→ Cosenza (loan)	12	(0)
2005–2008	Napoli	67	(2)
2008	→ Chievo (loan)	3	(0)
2008–2010	Gimnasia La Plata	67	(4)
2010–2011	Olimpia	39	(2)
2012–2013	Sportivo Carapeguá	44	(4)
2013–2014	Boca Unidos	54	(0)
2015	Guarani	34	(1)
2016–	Nacional	2	(0)

International career
1999	Paraguay U20	4	(1)
1999–	Paraguay	12	(0)
- * Club domestic league appearances and goals as of 15 February 2016 (UTC)

Rubén Dario Maldonado Brizuela (born 29 April 1979 in Asunción) is a former Paraguayan football defender who last played for Nacional in the Paraguayan Primera División.

He made his Italian Serie A debut on 11 March 2000, against Bologna F.C. 1909.

Maldonado was part of the Paraguay national under-20 football team that participated in the 1999 FIFA World Youth Championship he has since gone on to represent Paraguay at senior international level.

Maldonado signed for the team where he was "born in soccer", Club Olimpia. He took part of the squad in the second half of the 2010 season, the Clausura 2010 in Paraguay.
