= John Maisano =

Australian soccer player (born 1979)

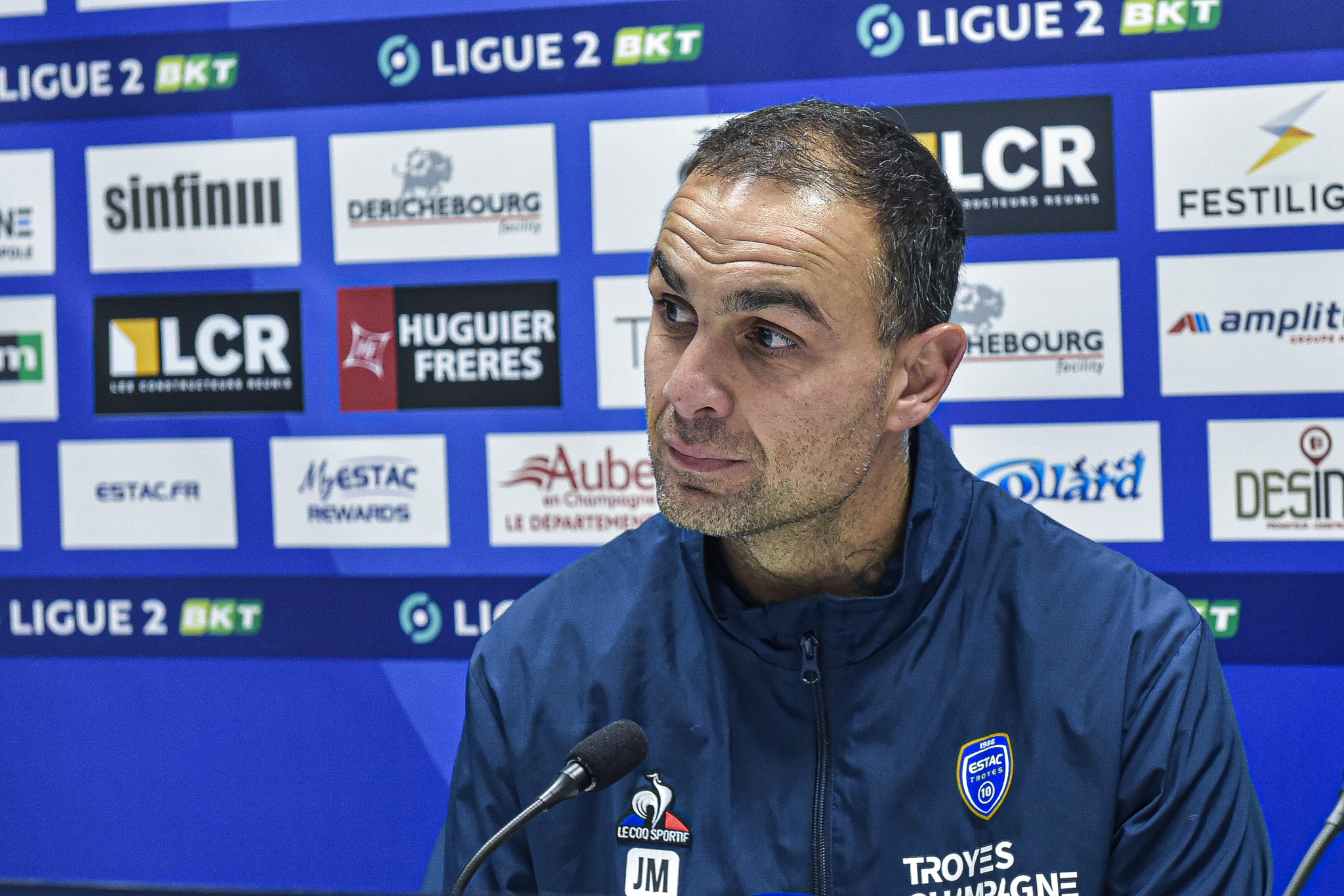
- Maisano post game with Troyes

Personal information
- Full name: John Marcel Maisano
- Date of birth: 6 January 1979 (age 47)
- Place of birth: Melbourne, Australia
- Height: 1.71 m (5 ft 7 in)
- Position: Midfielder

Team information
- Current team: Real Sociedad (assistant coach)

Youth career
- 1996–1997: Australian Institute of Sport

Senior career*
| Years | Team | Apps | (Gls) |
| 1997–1998 | Atalanta | 0 | (0) |
| 1998–1999 | Westerlo | 11 | (0) |
| 2000 | Helmond Sport | 3 | (1) |
| 2000–2002 | Marconi Stallions | 40 | (6) |
| 2002–2005 | Greenock Morton | 92 | (19) |
| 2005–2006 | Ayr United | 4 | (1) |
| 2006 | Stranraer | 3 | (0) |
| Total | | 153 | (27) |

International career
| 1994–1995 | Australia U17 | | |
| 1997–1999 | Australia U20 | | |

Managerial career
- 2018–2021: Bulleen Lions
- 2021–2022: Melbourne City NPL
- 2022–2023: Melbourne City (assistant)
- 2023–2024: Troyes (assistant)
- 2024–2025: Sydney FC (assistant)
- 2025–: Real Sociedad (assistant)
Medal record
Representing Australia
Men's Association football
OFC U-20 Championship
| Winner | 1998 Samoa |
- * Club domestic league appearances and goals

John Maisano (born 6 January 1979) is an Australian soccer manager and former player who is assistant coach of La Liga club Real Sociedad.

At club level, he played for Serie A side Atalanta, Westerlo in the Belgian Pro League, Helmond Sport in the Dutch Eerste Divisie, Marconi Stallions in the National Soccer League as well as Scottish clubs Greenock Morton, Ayr United and Stranraer.

Internationally, Maisano represented Australia at the 1995 FIFA U-17 World Championship and 1999 FIFA World Youth Championship.

== Club career ==
Maisano helped Greenock Morton win the 2002–03 Scottish Third Division title, after beating Peterhead on the final day of the season. After Morton he had brief spells at Ayr United and Stranraer.

Maisano retired from playing professionally in 2006, aged only 27. after suffering health issues.

== Managerial career ==
In 2016, Maisano became a coach for the Bulleen Lions under-20 side in the Victoria Premier League 1. He then took over as senior men's head coach in 2018 where he took the club to the Round of 16 and live stages of the Australia Cup and the semi finals of the Dockerty Cup for the first time in the clubs history. In the same year, he took the club to the Grand Final playoff at AAMI Park, missing out on promotion with a 1–0 loss.

In 2021 Maisano was employed by the City Football Group to be Melbourne City NPL head coach. He won automatic promotion to the NPL Victoria 2 in 2022, for the first time in the club's history. In 2022 Maisano was appointed Melbourne City assistant coach where he helped lead the club to become A-League Men champions. In 2023 he was appointed Troyes assistant coach in Ligue 2.

On 1 July 2024, Masiano was appointed as an assistant coach at Sydney FC. Masiano departed Sydney on 24 December 2025, after being offered a role with Spanish side Real Sociedad, becoming the first Australian to coach in La Liga.

== Personal life ==
Maisano was born in Melbourne to Argentine parents and has Italian citizenship.

In 2011, Maisano and his wife decided to return to Australia settling in Mornington Peninsula and launching their business venture Alien Fitness. He is the brother of Marco Maisano.

== Career statistics ==
=== Club ===
Appearances and goals by club, season and competition
| Club | Season | League | | | National cup | | League cup | | Other | | Total | |
| Club | Season | Division | Apps | Goals | Apps | Goals | Apps | Goals | Apps | Goals | Apps | Goals |
|---|---|---|---|---|---|---|---|---|---|---|---|---|
| Westerlo | 1998–99 | Belgian First Division | 11 | 0 | 0 | 0 | 0 | 0 | – | | 11 | 0 |
| Helmond Sport | 1999–2000 | Eerste Divisie | 3 | 1 | 0 | 0 | 0 | 0 | – | | 3 | 1 |
| Marconi Fairfield Stallions | 2000–01 | National Soccer League | 17 | 0 | | | – | | 2 (Note: Appearances in National Soccer League Finals) | 0 | 19 | 0 |
| Marconi Fairfield Stallions | 2001–02 | National Soccer League | 23 | 6 | | | – | | | | 23 | 6 |
| Marconi Fairfield Stallions | Total | | 40 | 6 | 0 | 0 | 0 | 0 | 2 | 0 | 42 | 6 |
| Greenock Morton | 2002–03 | Scottish Third Division | 33 | 6 | 3 | 0 | 1 | 0 | 1 (Note: Appearance(s) in Scottish Challenge Cup) | 0 | 38 | 6 |
| Greenock Morton | 2003–04 | Scottish Second Division | 29 | 7 | 2 | 0 | 2 | 0 | 2 | 1 | 35 | 8 |
| Greenock Morton | 2004–05 | Scottish Second Division | 30 | 6 | 0 | 0 | 2 | 0 | 1 | 0 | 33 | 6 |
| Greenock Morton | Total | | 92 | 19 | 5 | 0 | 5 | 0 | 4 | 1 | 106 | 20 |
| Ayr United | 2005–06 | Scottish Second Division | 3 | 1 | 0 | 0 | 0 | 0 | – | | 3 | 1 |
| Stranraer | 2005–06 | Scottish First Division | 4 | 0 | 0 | 0 | 0 | 0 | – | | 4 | 0 |
| Career total | | | 153 | 27 | 5 | 0 | 5 | 0 | 6 | 1 | 169 | 28 |

== Honours ==
Australia U-20

- OFC U-19 Men's Championship: 1998
