= Tenema N'Diaye =

Malian footballer

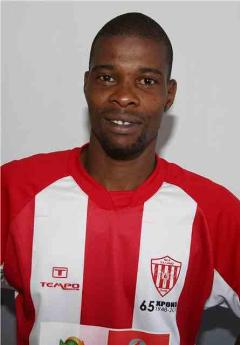
- N'Diaye in 2013

Personal information
- Date of birth: 13 February 1981 (age 45)
- Place of birth: Bamako, Mali
- Height: 1.81 m (5 ft 11 in)
- Position: Striker

Senior career*
Years	Team	Apps	(Gls)
1997–1999	Djoliba AC		
1999–2000	Stade Tunisien	20	(9)
2000–2003	CS Sfaxien	73	(42)
2003	Hong Kong Rangers		
2003–2004	Dubai Club		
2004–2005	Al-Wahda		(4)
2005–2007	Grenoble	28	(1)
2007–2009	Tours	57	(23)
2009–2010	Nantes	16	(6)
2010–2011	Metz	20	(4)
2012–2013	Kavala	12	(6)
2013–2014	Nea Salamina	15	(3)
Total		241	(98)

International career
1997–1999	Mali U-20	4	(2)
2003–2004	Mali U-23	4	(4)
2001–2011	Mali	21	(3)
- * Club domestic league appearances and goals

Tenema N'Diaye (born 13 February 1981) is a Malian former professional footballer who played as a striker.

== Club career ==
N'Diaye was born in Bamako. In August 2010, he joined FC Metz.
