= Francis Kioyo =

German footballer of Cameroonian descent (born 1979)

Personal information
- Full name: Francis Adissa Kioyo
- Date of birth: 18 September 1979 (age 47)
- Place of birth: Yaoundé, Cameroon
- Height: 1.93 m (6 ft 4 in)
- Position: Forward

Youth career
- 1997–1999: Union Douala
- 1999–2000: SG 01 Höchst

Senior career*
Years	Team	Apps	(Gls)
2000–2002	Greuther Fürth	55	(10)
2002–2003	1. FC Köln	28	(5)
2003–2004	1860 Munich	26	(2)
2004–2005	Rot-Weiss Essen	27	(6)
2005–2008	Energie Cottbus	66	(20)
2008	Maccabi Netanya	13	(4)
2008–2009	FC Augsburg	18	(0)
2009–2010	FC Aarau	7	(0)
2010–2011	Wehen Wiesbaden	11	(3)
2012–2013	SpVgg Bayreuth	22	(14)
2013–2014	FC Amberg	15	(6)

International career
2002–2004	Cameroon	3	(0)
- * Club domestic league appearances and goals

Francis Adissa Kioyo (born 18 September 1979) is a former professional footballer who played as a forward. Born in Yaoundé, Cameroon, he spent his professional career in Germany, playing in the Bundesliga and 2. Bundesliga, with later spells in Israel and Switzerland. He was capped by the Cameroon national team. In November 2007 he became a German citizen.

== Personal life ==
In November 2007, he became a German citizen and lost Cameroonian citizenship. He began his youth career with Union Douala in Cameroon before moving to Germany in 1999, joining SG 01 Höchst.

== Club Career ==
Kioyo began his senior career with SpVgg Greuther Fürth in the 2. Bundesliga, making 55 league appearances and scoring 10 goals between 2000 and 2002. He then joined 1. FC Köln for the 2002–03 season, scoring five goals in 28 appearances.

In 2003 he moved to 1860 Munich in the Bundesliga, making 26 appearances and scoring two goals, followed by a season at Rot-Weiss Essen in the 2. Bundesliga, where he made 27 appearances and scored six goals.

His most productive spell came at Energie Cottbus between 2005 and 2008, where he made 66 league appearances and scored 20 goals, helping the club to promotion to the Bundesliga in 2006.

He subsequently played for Maccabi Netanya in Israel in 2008 (13 appearances, four goals), returned to Germany with FC Augsburg (2008–09), and played for FC Aarau in Switzerland (2009–10) and Wehen Wiesbaden (2010–11). He later played in the German regional leagues for SpVgg Bayreuth (2012–13, 22 appearances, 14 goals) and FC Amberg (2013–14, 15 appearances, six goals).

== International Career ==
Kioyo earned three caps for the Cameroon national football team between 2002 and 2004, without scoring.

== Post-Playing Career ==
After retiring as a player, Kioyo moved into coaching and player development, based in Berlin. He holds a UEFA B+ coaching license and a DFB coaching certification, and holds a degree in sport science and fitness.

Since 2021, Kioyo has worked as a talent development coach for the German Football Association (DFB) at its Berlin-Charlottenburg center. He also founded BYSS, a Berlin-based youth football training company, and Kioyo Performance, a player-development company through which he coaches players from the United States and Europe.

Kioyo has also worked with International Soccer Academy, a Berlin-based residential football program, in a coaching and program-leadership role.
