= Baffour Gyan =

Ghanaian former professional footballer (born 1980)

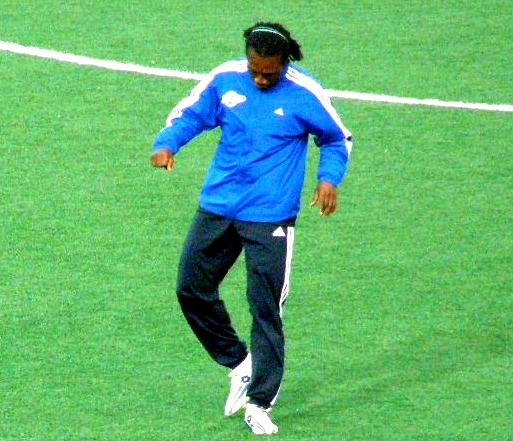
- Gyan in May 2008

Personal information
- Date of birth: 2 July 1980 (age 46)
- Place of birth: Accra, Ghana
- Height: 1.80 m (5 ft 11 in)
- Position: Striker

Youth career
- Liberty Professionals

Senior career*
Years	Team	Apps	(Gls)
1997	Liberty Professionals	0	(0)
1997–1998	AO Kalamata	16	(1)
1998–1999	Liberty Professionals		
1999–2000	Anagennisi Karditsas	8	(0)
2000	Liberty Professionals	22	(1)
2000–2004	Slovan Liberec	62	(11)
2004–2006	Dynamo Moscow	40	(3)
2006–2009	Saturn Moscow	37	(2)
2010–2011	Asante Kotoko	33	(15)
2011–2013	Al-Nasr Benghazi	56	(23)

International career
2001–2008	Ghana	25	(4)
- * Club domestic league appearances and goals

Baffour Gyan (born 2 July 1980) is a Ghanaian former professional footballer who played as a striker.

== Club career ==
Gyan was born in Accra. He played for Dynamo Moscow, FC Saturn and Czech side Slovan Liberec. After twelve years playing of playing football in Europe, he returned on 28 September 2009 back to his homeland Ghana and signed a three years contract with Asante Kotoko.

== International career ==
Gyan was a regular for Ghana and was part of the squad at the 2004 Summer Olympics. On 18 November 2007, he scored for Ghana in their 2–0 win against Togo in the Pre-2008 African Cup of Nations Tournament held in Accra, Ghana. He made 25 appearances for Ghana scoring 4 goals.

== Personal life ==
He is the brother of Asamoah Gyan and attended the Adisadel College in Cape Coast Ghana.

In September 2014, Baffour Gyan handed himself over to the police when the Ashanti Regional Editor of the Daily Graphic, Daniel Kenu, accused him of having led some people to assault him: during a pre-match press conference for the black stars 2015 African Cup qualifier against Uganda, Kenu had asked Asamoah Gyan to clarify a rumour that he had a hand in the disappearance of his friend, Theophilus Tagoe alias 'Castro', a musician. Kenu said much later on, Baffour Gyan who had not been at the press conference, met him and assaulted him. Baffour denied the accusation. Though the case went to court, Kenu withdrew the case citing health reasons.

== Career statistics ==
=== International ===
Appearances and goals by national team and year
National team	Year	Apps	Goals
Ghana	2001	6	2
Ghana	2002	3	0
Ghana	2003	2	1
Ghana	2004	7	0
Ghana	2007	2	1
Ghana	2008	5	0
Total		25	4

Scores and results list Ghana's goal tally first, score column indicates score after each Gyan goal.

List of international goals scored by Baffour Gyan
No.	Date	Venue	Opponent	Score	Result	Competition	Ref.
1	17 June 2001	Baba Yara Stadium, Kumasi, Ghana	Lesotho	2–0	3–1	2002 African Cup of Nations qualification	
2	25 December 2001	Stade Baréma Bocoum, Mopti, Mali	Mali	1–0	1–1	Friendly	
3	30 March 2003	7 November Stadium, Radès, Tunisia	Madagascar	3–1	3–3	Friendly	
4	18 November 2007	Accra Sports Stadium, Accra, Ghana	Togo	1–0	2–0	Friendly	
