= 1999 South American U-20 Championship squads =

The 1999 South American Youth Championship (Sudamericana sub-20) was a football competition contested by all ten national football teams of CONMEBOL. Each team was represented by the under-20 national football team. The tournament was held in Argentina between January 5 and January 25, 1999, the 23rd time the competition had been held.

== Group A ==
=== Argentina ===
D.T. (Argentina) Jose Nestor Pekerman

No.	Pos.	Player	Date of birth (age)	Caps	Club
1	GK	Franco Costanzo			(Argentina) River Plate
2	DF	Cristian Grabinski			(Argentina) Newells Old Boys
3	DF	Germán Rivarola			(Argentina) Rosario Central
4	DF	Juan Fernández			(Argentina) Estudiantes de la Plata
5	MF	Esteban Cambiasso			(Argentina) Independiente
6	DF	Gabriel Milito			(Argentina) Independiente
7	FW	Luciano Galletti			(Argentina) Estudiantes de la Plata
8	MF	Aldo Duscher			(Portugal) Sporting Lisboa
9	MF	Sixto Peralta			(Argentina) Huracan
10	MF	César La Paglia			(Argentina) Boca Juniors
11	MF	Pablo Aimar			(Argentina) River Plate
12	GK	Sebastián Saja			(Argentina) San Lorenzo de Almagro
13	DF	Carlos Roldán			(Argentina) Lanus
14	DF	Fernando Crosa			(Argentina) Newells Old Boys
15	MF	Javier Villarreal			(Argentina) Talleres de Cordoba
16	FW	Ernesto Farías			(Argentina) Estudiantes de la Plata
17	FW	Adrián Guillermo			(Argentina) Boca Juniors
18	MF	Lucas Castromán			(Argentina) Velez Sarsfield
19	MF	Daniel Montenegro			(Argentina) Huracan
20	DF	Ariel Franco			(Argentina) River Plate

  - (Nº1)Franco Costanzo GK 05/09/1980 River Plate (Argentina) **(Nº2)Cristian Emilio Grabinski (Poland) DF 01/12/1980 Newells Old Boys (Argentina) **(Nº3)German Ezequiel Rivarola DF/MF 18/04/1979 Rosario Central (Argentina) **(Nº4)Juan Ramon Fernandez DF 05/03/1980 Estudiantes La Plata (Argentina) **(Nº5)Esteban Matias Cambiasso MF 18/08/1980 Club Atletico Independiente (Argentina) **(Nº6)Gabriel Alejandro Milito DF 07/09/1980 Club Atletico Independiente (Argentina) **(Nº7)Luciano Martin Galletti FW 09/04/1980 Estudiantes La Plata (Argentina) **(Nº8)Aldo Pedro Duscher (Austria) MF 22/03/1979 Sporting Lisboa (Portugal) **(Nº9)Sixto Raimundo Peralta MF 16/04/1979 Huracan (Argentina) **(Nº10)Cesar Osvaldo La Paglia MF 25/02/1979 Boca Juniors (Argentina) **(Nº11)Pablo Cesar Aimar (Spain) MF 03/11/1979 River Plate (Argentina) **(Nº12)Diego Sebastian Saja GK 05/06/1979 San Lorenzo de Almagro (Argentina) **(Nº13)Carlos Sebastian Roldan DF 12/09/1979 Lanus (Argentina) **(Nº14)Fernando Javier Crosa DF 28/02/1979 Newells Old Boys (Argentina) **(Nº15)Javier Alejandro Villarreal MF 01/03/1979 Talleres de Cordoba (Argentina) **(Nº16)Ernesto Antonio Farias FW 29/05/1980 Estudiantes La Plata (Argentina) **(Nº17)Sergio Adrian Guillermo FW 15/03/1980 Boca Juniors (Argentina) **(Nº18)Lucas Martin Castroman MF 02/10/1980 Velez Sarsfield (Argentina) **(Nº19)Daniel Gaston Montenegro MF 28/03/1979 Huracan (Argentina) **(Nº20)Ariel Horacio Franco DF 02/06/1978 River Plate (Argentina)

=== Chile ===
D.T. (Chile) Vladimir Bigorra

No.	Pos.	Player	Date of birth (age)	Caps	Club
1	GK	Felipe Núñez	25 February 1979 (aged 19)		(Chile) Colo Colo
2	DF	Cristián Álvarez	20 January 1980 (aged 18)		(Chile) Universidad Católica
3	DF	Claudio Maldonado	3 January 1980 (aged 19)		(Chile) Colo-Colo
4	DF	Alejandro Escalona	14 August 1979 (aged 19)		(Chile) Colo-Colo
5	DF	César Santis	5 February 1979 (aged 19)		(Chile) Unión Española
6	MF	Nicolás Córdova	9 February 1979 (aged 19)		(Chile) Colo-Colo
7	FW	Rodolfo Moya	27 July 1979 (aged 19)		(Chile) Universidad Católica
8	MF	David Pizarro	11 September 1979 (aged 19)		(Chile) Santiago Wanderers
9	FW	Julio Gutiérrez	14 September 1979 (aged 19)		(Chile) Unión Española
10	MF	Milovan Mirosevic	20 June 1980 (aged 18)		(Chile) Universidad Católica
11	MF	Patricio Ormazábal	12 February 1979 (aged 19)		(Chile) Universidad Católica
12	GK	Johnny Herrera	9 May 1981 (aged 17)		Universidad de Chile
13	MF	Gamadiel García	20 July 1979 (aged 19)		Universidad de Chile
14	DF	Cristián Reynero	25 August 1979 (aged 19)		(Chile) Huachipato
15	MF	Germán Navea	10 February 1980 (aged 18)		(Chile) Deportes La Serena
16	MF	Mauricio Neveu	23 February 1979 (aged 19)		(Chile) Santiago Wanderers
17	MF	Alonso Zúñiga	23 March 1980 (aged 18)		(Chile) Colo-Colo
18	DF	Luis Mena	28 August 1979 (aged 19)		(Chile) Colo-Colo
19	DF	Denis Montecinos	23 January 1980 (aged 18)		(Chile) Huachipato
20	FW	Patricio Neira	18 April 1979 (aged 19)		(Chile) Palestino

  - (Nº1)Felipe Alejandro Nuñez (Venezuela) GK 25/02/1979 Colo Colo (Chile) **(Nº2)Cristian Andres Alvarez DF 20/01/1980 Club Deportivo Universidad Catolica (Chile) **(Nº3)Claudio Andres Maldonado DF/MF 03/01/1980 Colo Colo (Chile) **(Nº4)Alejandro Adrian Escalona DF 14/08/1979 Colo Colo (Chile) **(Nº5)Cesar Elias Santis MF 05/02/1979 Union Española (Chile) **(Nº6)Nicolas Andres Cordova MF 09/02/1979 Colo Colo (Chile) **(Nº7)Rodolfo Antonio Moya FW 27/07/1979 Club Deportivo Universidad Catolica (Chile) **(Nº8)David Marcelo Pizarro MF 11/09/1979 Santiago Wanderers (Chile) **(Nº9)Julio Brian Gutierrez FW 14/09/1979 Union Española (Chile) **(Nº10)Milovan Petar Mirosevic MF 20/06/1980 Club Deportivo Universidad Catolica (Chile) **(Nº11)Luis Patricio or Patricio Luis Ormazabal MF 12/02/1979 Club Universidad Catolica (Chile) **(Nº12)Johnny Cristian Herrera GK 09/05/1981 Universidad de Chile (Chile) **(Nº13)Gamadiel Adrian Garcia MF 20/07/1979 Universidad de Chile (Chile) **(Nº14)Cristian Eduardo Reynero DF/MF 25/08/1979 Club Huachipato (Chile) **(Nº15)German Antonio Navea MF 10/02/1980 Club de Deportes La Serena (Chile) **(Nº16)Mauricio Alberto Neveu MF 23/02/1979 Santiago Wanderers (Chile) **(Nº17)Patricio Alonso Zuñiga MF 23/03/1980 Colo Colo (Chile) **(Nº18)Luis Arturo Mena DF 28/08/1979 Colo Colo (Chile) **(Nº19)Denis Montecinos MF 23/01/1980 Club Huachipato (Chile) **(Nº20)Patricio Enrique Neira FW 18/04/1979 Club Deportivo Palestino (Chile)

=== Peru ===
D.T. (Peru) Mario Gonzalez Benitez

No.	Pos.	Player	Date of birth (age)	Caps	Club
1	GK	Carlos Benavídes Escardo			(Peru) Sporting Cristal
2	DF	Ismael Alvarado			(Peru) Sporting Cristal
3	DF	Jorge Araujo			(Peru) Universitario
4	DF	Ernesto Arakaki			(Peru) Deportivo Municipal
5	DF	Amilton Prado			(Peru) Sporting Cristal
6	DF	Ruben Almanza			(Peru) Sporting Cristal
7	FW	César Balbín			(Peru) Sporting Cristal
8	MF	Luis Cordero			(Peru) Universitario
9	FW	Piero Alva			(Peru) Universitario
10	MF	Mario Gómez			(Peru) Universitario
11	MF	Dennis Reátegui			(Peru) Sport Boys
12	GK	Francisco Bazán			(Peru) Juan Aurich
13	DF	Juan Carlos La Rosa			(Peru) Juan Aurich
14	MF	Oswaldo Carrión			(Peru) Juan Aurich
15	FW	Pedro Ascoy			(Peru) Alianza Lima
16	MF	Marco Casas			(Peru) Sporting Cristal
17	FW	Víctor Cotito			(Peru) Universitario
18	MF	Anthony Matellini			(Peru) Universitario
19	MF	Andy Salinas			(Peru) Sporting Cristal
20	GK	Alberto Cerro			(Peru) Atletico Grau

  - (Nº1)Carlos Benavides Escardo GK 14/01/1979 Sporting Cristal (Peru) **(Nº2)Ismael Enrique Alvarado DF 22/10/1980 Sporting Cristal (Peru) **(Nº3)Jorge Martin Araujo DF 30/11/1979 Universitario de Deportes Lima (Peru) **(Nº4)Ernesto Seiko Arakaki (Japan) DF 13/06/1979 Deportivo Municipal (Peru) **(Nº5)Amilton Fair Prado DF 06/05/1979 Sporting Cristal (Peru) **(Nº6)Ruben Marcelino Almanza DF 12/01/1980 Sporting Cristal (Peru) **(Nº7)Cesar Eduardo Balbin FW 18/05/1981 Sporting Cristal (Peru) **(Nº8)Luis Enrique Cordero MF 08/04/1981 Universitario de Deportes Lima (Peru) **(Nº9)Piero Fernando Alva FW 14/02/1979 Universitario de Deportes Lima (Peru) **(Nº10)Mario Augusto Gomez MF/DF 27/05/1981 Universitario de Deportes Lima (Peru) **(Nº11)Dennis Reategui MF 29/07/1979 Sport Boys Callao (Peru) **(Nº12)Francisco de Paula Bazan GK 10/10/1980 Juan Aurich (Peru) **(Nº13)Juan Carlos La Rosa DF/MF 03/03/1980 Juan Aurich (Peru) **(Nº14)Luis Oswaldo Carrion MF/FW 31/05/1980 Juan Aurich (Peru) **(Nº15)Pedro Luis Ascoy FW 10/08/1980 Alianza Lima (Peru) **(Nº16)Marco Antonio Casas MF 26/05/1979 Sporting Cristal (Peru) **(Nº17)Victor Cotito FW 28/04/1980 Universitario de Deportes (Peru) **(Nº18)Anthony Thomas Matellini MF 27/02/1980 Universitario de Deportes (Peru) **(Nº19)Andy Gabriel Salinas MF 11/03/1981 Sporting Cristal (Peru) **(Nº20)Alberto Carlos Cerro GK 03/05/1979 Atletico Grau (Peru)

=== Ecuador ===
D.T. (Ecuador) Carlos Torres Garces

No.	Pos.	Player	Date of birth (age)	Caps	Club
12	GK	Julio Guzmán			(Ecuador) Rocafuerte
1	GK	Edwin Villafuerte			(Ecuador) Barcelona SC
2	FW	Jorge Padilla			Universidad de Chile
3	MF	Carlos Hidalgo			(Ecuador) Emelec CS
4	DF	Lizandro Torres			(Ecuador) Barcelona SC
5	DF	Arlin Ayoví			(Ecuador) Barcelona SC
17	DF	Ivan Bebeto Quintero			(Ecuador) LDU Quito
19	DF	Geovanny Cortez			(Ecuador) El Nacional
14	MF	Jaime Caicedo			(Ecuador) Rocafuerte F.C.
16	MF	Leonardo Borja			(Ecuador) Audaz Octubrino
13	DF	Facundo Corozo			(Ecuador) Deportivo Santa Rita
11	FW	Marco Bonito			(Ecuador) El Nacional
8	MF	Leorvelis Mina			(Ecuador) LDU Quito
20	MF	José Tenorio			(Ecuador) LDU Quito
6	DF	Darwin Ordóñez			(Ecuador) Deportivo Quninde
10	MF	Edison Méndez			(Ecuador) Deportivo Quito
15	FW	Líder Mejía			(Ecuador) LDU Quito
9	FW	Otelino Tenorio			(Ecuador) Emelec CS
7	FW	Daniel Chedraui			(Ecuador) Barcelona
18	FW	Washington España			(Ecuador) Deportivo Cuenca

  - (Nº1)Edwin Alberto Villafuerte GK 12/03/1979 Barcelona Sporting Club (Ecuador) **(Nº2)Lizandro Bolivar Torres DF 30/03/1980 Barcelona Sporting Club (Ecuador) **(Nº3)Arlin Segundo Ayovi DF 06/05/1979 Barcelona Sporting Club (Ecuador) **(Nº4)Ivan Bebeto Quinteros DF 11/10/1979 Emelec Club Sportivo (Ecuador) **(Nº5)Jaime Ramiro Caicedo MF 12/11/1981 Rocafuerte Futbol Club (Ecuador) **(Nº6)Geovanny Cortes DF 11/03/1980 Espoli Club Deportivo (Ecuador) **(Nº7)Lider Mejia MF 26/01/1981 Liga Deportiva Universitaria Quito (Ecuador) **(Nº8)Leonardo Segundo Borja MF 06/09/1979 Barcelona Sporting Club (Ecuador) **(Nº9)Marco Bonito FW 16/02/1979 Deportivo Aucas or El Nacional (Ecuador) **(Nº10)Jorge Padilla FW 09/10/1980 Independiente del Valle (Ecuador) **(Nº11)Johnny Alejandro Baldeon FW 15/06/1981 Deportivo Quito (Ecuador) **(Nº12)Julio Guzman GK 23/02/1979 Escuela Ecuafutbol (Ecuador) **(Nº13)Daniel Adolfo Chedraui MF 07/12/1979 Audax Octubrino (Ecuador) **(Nº14)Facundo Jesus Corozo DF 25/12/1979 Municipal Cañar (Ecuador) **(Nº15)Carlos Ramon Hidalgo MF 09/02/1979 Emelec Club Sportivo (Ecuador) **(Nº16)Darwin Eliut Ordoñez DF 18/06/1980 Delfin Sporting Club (Ecuador) **(Nº17)Edison Vicente Mendez MF/FW 16/03/1979 Deportivo Quito (Ecuador) **(Nº18)Jose German Tenorio MF 20/05/1981 El Nacional (Ecuador) **(Nº19)Otelino George Tenorio FW 01/02/1980 Emelec Club Sportivo (Ecuador) **(Nº20)Leorvelis Salomon Mina MF 16/02/1980 Club 9 de Octubre (Ecuador) **(Nº21)Washington Stalin España FW 20/06/1979 Deportivo Cuenca (Ecuador)

=== Venezuela ===
D.T. (Venezuela) Richard Paez

No.	Pos.	Player	Date of birth (age)	Caps	Club
1	GK	Renny Vega			(Venezuela) Nacional Tachira
2	DF	Carlos Toscano			(Venezuela) Zamora F.C.
3	DF	Javier Villafraz			(Venezuela) Estudiantes de Merida
4	DF	William Pérez			(Venezuela) Carabobo F.C.
5	DF	Miguel Mea Vitali			(Venezuela) Caracas F.C.
6	MF	Gerzon Chacón			(Venezuela) Deportivo Tachira
7	MF	Laideker Navas			(Venezuela) Monagas S.C.
8	DF	Leandro Sequera			(Venezuela) Carabobo F.C.
9	MF	Francisco Martín			(Venezuela) Zulianos F.C.
10	MF	Ricardo Páez			(Argentina) CA Lanus
11	MF	Juan Arango			(Venezuela) Nueva Cadiz F.C.
12	GK	Willian Tortolero			(Venezuela) Caracas F.C.
13	FW	Jesús Marquez			(Venezuela) Trujillanos F.C.
14	FW	Jonhatan Rosas			(Venezuela) Trujillanos F.C.
15	MF	Gerardo Figueras			(Venezuela) Deportivo Anzoategui
16	MF	Johnny González			(Venezuela) Deportivo Tachira
17	DF	Gregory Lanken			(Venezuela) Mineros de Guayana
18	DF	Hasil Halley			(Venezuela) Monagas S.C.
19	DF	Luis Rodríguez			(Venezuela) Mineros de Guayana
20	FW	José Torrealba			(Venezuela) Universidad Los Andes F.C.

  - (Nº1)Renny Vicente Vega GK 04/07/1979 Club Nacional Tachira (Venezuela) **(Nº2)Carlos Toscano DF 10/01/1981 Zamora Futbol Club (Venezuela) **(Nº3)Jose Javier Villafraz DF/MF 01/01/1980 Estudiantes de Merida (Venezuela) **(Nº4)William Perez DF 11/10/1979 Carabobo Futbol Club (Venezuela) **(Nº5)Miguel Angel Mea Vitali MF 19/02/1981 Caracas Futbol Club (Venezuela) **(Nº6)Gerzon Armando Chacon MF 27/10/1980 Deportivo Tachira (Venezuela) **(Nº7)Laideker Navas MF 05/02/1980 Monagas Sporting Club (Venezuela) **(Nº8)Leandro Sequera DF 02/02/1979 Carabobo Futbol Club (Venezuela) **(Nº9)Francisco Jesus Martin MF 19/03/1979 Zulianos Futbol Club (Venezuela) **(Nº10)Ricardo David Paez MF 09/02/1979 Club Atletico Lanus (Argentina) or Estudiantes de Merida (Venezuela) **(Nº11)Juan Fernando Arango (Spain) MF 16/05/1980 Caracas Futbol Club (Venezuela) **(Nº12)William Tortolero GK 16/03/1980 Caracas Futbol Club (Venezuela) **(Nº13)Jesus Eugenio Marquez FW 09/03/1979 Trujillanos Futbol Club (Venezuela) **(Nº14)Jonhatan Rosas FW 02/11/1979 Trujillanos Futbol Club (Venezuela) **(Nº15)Gerardo Figueras FW 03/02/1980 Deportivo Anzoategui (Venezuela) **(Nº16)Johnny Gonzalez MF 09/12/1979 Deportivo Tachira (Venezuela) **(Nº17)Gregory Evans Lanken DF 07/05/1979 Mineros de Guayana (Venezuela) **(Nº18)Hasil Arsari Halley DF/MF 26/09/1979 Monagas Sporting Club (Venezuela) **(Nº19)Luis Junior Rodriguez DF/MF 04/11/1979 Mineros de Guayana (Venezuela) **(Nº20)Jose Antonio Torreablba FW 13/06/1980 Universidad Los Andes (Venezuela)

== Group B ==
D.T. (Brazil) Joao Carlos Da Silva Costa

=== Brazil ===
No.	Pos.	Player	Date of birth (age)	Caps	Club
1	GK	Júlio César	3 September 1979 (aged 19)		(Brazil) Flamengo
2	DF	Filipe Alvim	13 January 1979 (aged 19)		(Brazil) Santa Cruz
3	DF	Fernando	25 February 1980 (aged 18)		(Brazil) Flamengo
4	DF	Rafael	22 March 1979 (aged 19)		(Brazil) Botafogo
5	MF	Ferrugem	6 October 1980 (aged 18)		(Brazil) Palmeiras
6	DF	Fábio Aurélio	24 September 1979 (aged 19)		(Brazil) São Paulo
7	MF	Eriberto (Note: Luciano Siqueira de Oliveira (Eriberto) used false documentation to participate in the competition.)	3 December 1975 (aged 23)		(Italy) Bologna
8	MF	Matuzalém	10 June 1980 (aged 18)		(Brazil) Vitória
9	FW	Rodrigo Gral (Note: Rodrigo Gral used false documentation to participate in the competition.)	21 February 1977 (aged 21)		(Brazil) Grêmio
10	MF	Lincoln	22 January 1979 (aged 19)		(Brazil) Atletico Mineiro
11	FW	Ronaldinho	21 March 1980 (aged 18)		(Brazil) Grêmio
12	GK	Fábio	30 July 1980 (aged 18)		(Brazil) União Bandeirante
13	DF	Maricá	24 September 1979 (aged 19)		(Brazil) Vasco da Gama
14	DF	Gavião	2 February 1980 (aged 18)		(Brazil) Grêmio
15	MF	Rocha			(Brazil) Flamengo
16	MF	Marcinho	20 March 1981 (aged 17)		(Brazil) Etti Jundiaí
17	MF	Jocivalter	6 May 1979 (aged 19)		(Brazil) Guarani
18	FW	Edu	21 March 1980 (aged 18)		(Brazil) São Paulo
19	FW	Márcio Carioca (Note: Márcio Carioca used false documentation to participate in the competition.)	6 December 1978 (aged 20)		(Brazil) São Paulo
20	GK	Allan	30 January 1979 (aged 19)		(Brazil) São Paulo

Their possible replacements in said team could have been:***(Nº7)Fabio de Lima Pinto MF 08/09/1979 Club Atletico Paranense (Brazil). ***(Nº9)Thiago Gentil (Italy) FW 08/04/1980 Sociedade Esportiva Palmeiras (Brazil) ***(Nº19)Luis Fabiano Clemente (Spain) FW 08/11/1980 Associacao Atletica Ponte Preta (Brazil)

=== Uruguay ===
D.T. (Uruguay) Victor Haroldo Pua

No.	Pos.	Player	Date of birth (age)	Caps	Club
1	GK	Fabián Carini			(Uruguay) Danubio
2	DF	Fernando Carreño			(Uruguay) Peñarol
3	DF	Gonzalo Sorondo			(Uruguay) Defensor Sporting
4	DF	Carlos Richard Díaz			(Uruguay) Defensor Sporting
5	MF	Fernando Machado			(Mexico) UNAM
6	DF	César Pellegrín			(Italy) Ternana
7	MF	Alejandro Correa	26 October 1979 (aged 19)		(Uruguay) Nacional
8	MF	Diego Pérez			(Uruguay) Defensor Sporting
9	FW	Javier Chevantón			(Uruguay) Danubio
10	MF	Adrian Sarkissian	13 February 1979 (aged 19)		(Uruguay) River Plate
11	FW	Diego Forlán			(Argentina) Independiente
12	GK	Mauricio Nanni			(Uruguay) Montevideo Wanderers
13	DF	Damián Macaluso	9 March 1980 (aged 18)		(Uruguay) Central Español
14	DF	Pablo Pallante			(Uruguay) Montevideo Wanderers
15	MF	Fernando Albermager			(Uruguay) C.A. Peñarol
16	MF	Omar Pouso			(Uruguay) Danubio
17	MF	Fabián Canobbio			(Uruguay) Progreso
18	MF	Martín Liguera			(Uruguay) Nacional
19	FW	Fernando Cardozo	27 April 1979 (aged 19)		(Uruguay) Huracán Buceo
20	FW	Carlos Bueno			(Uruguay) Peñarol

  - (Nº1)Fabian Carini GK 26/12/1979 Danubio Futbol Club (Uruguay) **(Nº2)Fernando Carreño DF 15/01/1979 Club Atletico Peñarol (Uruguay) **(Nº3)Gonzalo Sorondo DF 09/10/1979 Defensor Sporting (Uruguay) **(Nº4)Carlos Richard Diaz DF 04/02/1979 Defensor Sporting (Uruguay) **(Nº5)Fernando Pacheco MF 22/02/1981 Universidad Nacional Autonoma de Mexico (Mexico) **(Nº6)Cesar Pellegrin MF 05/03/1979 Ternana Calcio S.p.A. 1929 (Italy) **(Nº8)Diego Perez MF 18/05/1980 Defensor Sporting (Uruguay) **(Nº9)Javier Chevanton FW 12/08/1980 Danubio Futbol Club (Uruguay) **(Nº11)Diego Forlan FW 19/05/1979 Club Atletico Independiente (Argentina) **(Nº12)Mauricio Nanni GK 12/07/1979 Montevideo Wanderers (Uruguay) **(Nº14)Pablo Pallante DF 14/02/1979 Montevideo Wanderers (Uruguay) **(Nº15)Fernando Albermager MF 19/01/1979 Club Atletico Peñarol (Uruguay) **(Nº16)Omar Pouso MF 28/02/1980 Danubio Futbol Club (Uruguay) **(Nº17)Fabian Canobbio MF 08/03/1980 Club Atletico Progreso (Uruguay) **(Nº18)Martin Liguera MF 09/11/1980 Club Nacional de Football (Uruguay) **(Nº20)Carlos Bueno FW 10/05/1980 Club Atletico Peñarol (Uruguay)

=== Paraguay ===
D.T. (Paraguay) Mario Cesar Jacquet

No.	Pos.	Player	Date of birth (age)	Caps	Club
1	GK	José Antonio Fernández			(Paraguay) San Lorenzo
2	DF	Héctor Benítez			(Paraguay) Cerro Porteño
3	DF	Roberto Carlos Blanco			(Paraguay) Sportivo Luqueño
4	DF	Paulo Cesar da Silva			(Paraguay) Cerro Porteño
5	DF	Rubén Dario Maldonado			(Paraguay) Olimpia
6	MF	Ever Giménez			(Paraguay) San Lorenzo
7	FW	Juan Angel Paredes			(Mexico) America
8	MF	Diego Gavilán			(Paraguay) Cerro Porteño
9	FW	Roque Abel Santa Cruz			(Paraguay) Olimpia
10	MF	Francisco Escobar			(Paraguay) Sportivo Luqueño
11	FW	Nelson Cuevas			(Paraguay) Atlético Tembetary
12	GK	Christian Daniel Florentín			(Paraguay) Cerro Cora
13	FW	Nelson Vera			(Paraguay) Nacional
14	DF	Elvis Israel Marecos			(Paraguay) Sportivo Iteño
15	FW	Salvador Cabañas			(Paraguay) 12 de Octubre
16	MF	Jorge Orlando Brítez			(Paraguay) Presidente Hayes
17	MF	Virgilio Rodolfo Ojeda			(Paraguay) Nacional
18	FW	Sergio Fernández			(Paraguay) Cerro Cora
19	MF	Mariano David Barrientos			(Paraguay) Sportivo Luqueño
20	MF	Miguel Ángel Domínguez			(Paraguay) Cerro Porteño

  - (Nº1)Jose Antonio Fernandez GK 23/01/1979 Club Sportivo San Lorenzo (Paraguay) **(Nº2)Hector Dario Benitez DF 05/01/1980 Cerro Porteño (Paraguay) **(Nº3)Roberto Carlos Blanco DF 17/04/1980 Sportivo Luqueño (Paraguay) **(Nº4)Paulo Cesar da Silva DF 01/02/1980 Cerro Porteño (Paraguay) **(Nº5)Ruben Dario Maldonado DF 29/04/1979 Club Olimpia (Paraguay) **(Nº6)Ever Gimenez MF 20/04/1979 Club Sportivo San Lorenzo (Paraguay) **(Nº7)Juan Angel Paredes FW 30/03/1979 America Club de Futbol (Mexico) **(Nº8)Diego Antonio Gavilan MF 01/03/1980 Cerro Porteño (Paraguay) **(Nº9)Roque Luis Santa Cruz FW 16/08/1981 Club Olimpia (Paraguay) **(Nº10)Francisco Javier Escobar MF 03/12/1979 Sportivo Luqueño (Paraguay) **(Nº11)Nelson Rafael Cuevas FW 10/01/1980 Atletico Tambetary (Paraguay) **(Nº12)Christian Daniel Florentin GK 02/05/1979 Club Cerro Cora (Paraguay) **(Nº13)Nelson Vera FW 07/10/1979 Club Nacional (Paraguay) **(Nº14)Elvis Israel Marecos DF 15/02/1980 Club Sportivo Iteño (Paraguay) **(Nº15)Salvador Cabañas Ortega FW 05/08/1980 12 de Octubre F.C. (Paraguay) **(Nº16)Jorge Orlando Britez MF 08/02/1981 Presidente Hayes (Paraguay) **(Nº17)Virgilio Rodolfo Ojeda MF 19/02/1982 Club Nacional (Paraguay) **(Nº18)Sergio Enrique Fernandez FW 31/07/1979 Club Cerro Cora (Paraguay) **(Nº19)Mariano David Barrientos DF 03/08/1979 Sportivo Luqueño (Paraguay) **(Nº20)Miguel Angel Dominguez MF 30/09/1979 Cerro Porteño (Paraguay)

=== Colombia ===
D.T. (Colombia) Fernando Castro Lozada

No.	Pos.	Player	Date of birth (age)	Caps	Club
12	GK	Jaime Barrientos			(Colombia) Independiente Medellin
1	GK	Diego León Hoyos			(Colombia) Atletico Nacional
2	DF	Andrés Orozco			(Colombia) Deportes Quindio
4	DF	José Mera			(Colombia) Deportes Quindio
3	DF	Jimmy Asprilla			(Colombia) Atletico Huila
19	DF	Jair Benítez			(Colombia) CD Envigado F.C.
6	DF	Ronald Alegrías			(Colombia) America de Cali
15	DF	Juan González			(Colombia) CD Envigado F.C.
13	DF	Hermes Martínez			(Colombia) CD Millonarios
11	MF	Andrés Pérez			(Colombia) Real Cartagena
14	MF	David Ferreira			(Colombia) Real Cartagena
20	MF	Néstor Vásquez			(Colombia) Deportivo Cali
5	MF	Fabián Vargas			(Colombia) America de Cali
18	MF	Mauricio Molina			(Colombia) CD Envigado F.C.
16	MF	Juan Leal			(Colombia) CD Envigado F.C.
10	MF	Deivi Palacio			(Colombia) La Equidad
8	DF	Gustavo Victoria			(Colombia) Deportes Quindio
17	FW	Cristian Gil			(Peru) Atletico Torino
7	FW	Jeffrey Díaz			(Colombia) Condor F.C.
9	FW	Emerson Acuña			(Colombia) Junior Barranquilla

  - (Nº1)Diego Leon Hoyos GK 08/09/1980 Atletico Nacional (Colombia) **(Nº2)Andres Felipe Orozco DF 18/03/1979 Deportes Quindio (Colombia) **(Nº3)Jimmy Adolfo Asprilla DF 01/06/1980 Atletico Huila (Colombia) **(Nº4)Jose Hermes Mera DF 11/03/1979 Deportes Quindio (Colombia) **(Nº5)Fabian Andres Vargas MF 17/04/1980 America de Cali (Colombia) **(Nº6)Roland Augusto Alegrias MF 31/05/1979 America de Cali (Colombia) **(Nº7)Jeffrey Jose Diaz FW 13/09/1979 Condor F.C. o Independiente Medellin Santa Fe (Colombia) **(Nº8)Gustavo Andres Victoria DF 14/05/1980 Deportes Quindio (Colombia) **(Nº9)Emerson de Jesus Acuña FW 16/06/1979 Junior Barranquilla (Colombia) **(Nº10)Deivi Palacio MF 15/04/1980 La Equidad (Colombia) **(Nº11)Andres Eduardo Perez MF 05/09/1980 Real Cartagena (Colombia) **(Nº12)Jaime Barrientos GK 07/02/1980 Independiente Medellin (Colombia) **(Nº13)Hermes Martinez Misal DF 23/10/1979 Club Deportivo Millonarios (Colombia) **(Nº14)David Arturo Ferreira MF 09/08/1979 Real Cartagena (Colombia) **(Nº15)Juan Diego Gonzalez DF 22/09/1980 Club Deportivo Envigado (Colombia) **(Nº16)Juan Fernando Leal MF 02/08/1980 Club Deportivo Envigado (Colombia) **(Nº17)Cristian Ali Gil MF 18/08/1979 Atletico Torino (Peru) **(Nº18)Mauricio Molina MF 30/04/1980 Club Deportivo Envigado (Colombia) **(Nº19)Jair Benitez Sinisterra DF 12/01/1979 Club Deportivo Envigado (Colombia) **(Nº20)Nestor Vazquez MF 28/06/1979 Deportivo Cali (Colombia)

=== Bolivia ===
D.T. (Bolivia) Eduardo Guliarte

No.	Pos.	Player	Date of birth (age)	Caps	Club
1	GK	Carlos Erwin Arias			(Bolivia) Blooming
12	GK	Nelson Mejía Aguilar			(Bolivia) La Paz FC
2	DF	Jesús Alejandro Gómez			(Bolivia) Blooming
6	DF	Luis Gatty Ribeiro			(Bolivia) Bolivar
4	DF	Luis Victor Ortiz			(Bolivia) Real Potosi
3	DF	Eibar Peña Arteaga			(Bolivia) Real Mamore
15	DF	Juan Doyle Vaca			(Bolivia) Independiente Petrolero
20	DF	Ronald Raldes Balcázar			(Bolivia) Destroyers
5	MF	Ronald García Justiniano			(Bolivia) Bolivar
8	MF	Daniel Callau Melgar			(Bolivia) The Strongest
10	MF	Diego Bengolea Vargas			(Bolivia) Jorge Wilsterman
13	DF	Wílder Arévalo Ramírez			(Bolivia) Jorge Wilsterman
16	MF	Ronald Gutiérrez Flores			(Bolivia) The Strongest
18	MF	Marco Melgar Vargas			(Bolivia) Real Potosi
17	DF	Daniel Jaramillo Rojas			(Bolivia) Union Central
14	MF	Raúl Becerra Vaca			(Bolivia) Real Mamore
19	FW	Augusto Andaveris Iriondo			(Bolivia) Bolivar
7	FW	Danilo Eterovic Zapata			(Bolivia) Jorge Wilsterman
9	FW	Juan Pablo Grass Galvez			(Bolivia) Independiente Petrolero
11	FW	Marcos Lenard Galvez			(Bolivia) Guabira

  - (Nº1)Carlos Erwin Arias GK 18/02/1980 Blooming (Bolivia) **(Nº2)Jesus Alejandro Gomez DF/MF 18/07/1979 Blooming (Bolivia) **(Nº3)Eibar Peña Arteaga DF //19 Real Mamore (Bolivia) **(Nº4)Luis Victor Ortiz 08/05/1980 DF Real Potosi (Bolivia) **(Nº5)Roland Lazaro Garcia Justiniano MF 17/12/1980 Club Bolivar (Bolivia) **(Nº6)Luis Gatty Ribeiro DF/MF 01/11/1979 Club Bolivar (Bolivia) **(Nº7)Danilo Eterovic Zapata FW 23/05/1980 Jorge Wilstermann (Bolivia) **(Nº8)Daniel Callau Melgar MF 21/02/1979 The Strongest (Bolivia) **(Nº9)Juan Pablo Grass FW 06/06/1980 Independiente Petrolero (Bolivia) **(Nº10)Diego Bengolea Vargas MF/DF 07/12/1979 Jorge Wilstermann (Bolivia) **(Nº11)Marcos Lenard Galvez Guabira 12/07/1981 Club Guabira (Bolivia) **(Nº12)Nelson Mejia Aguilar GK 15/11/1981 La Paz F.C. (Bolivia) **(Nº13)Wilder Arevalo Ramirez DF 30/04/1980 Jorge Wilstermann (Bolivia) **(Nº14)Raul Becerra Vaca MF 15/04/1980 Real Mamore (Bolivia) **(Nº15)Juan Doyle Vaca DF 08/10/1980 Independiente Petrolero (Bolivia) **(Nº16)Roland Gutierrez Flores MF 02/12/1979 The Strongest (Bolivia) **(Nº17)Daniel Jaramillo Rojas DF 19/05/1980 Club Union Central (Bolivia) **(Nº18)Marco Antonio Melgar Vargas MF 17/04/1980 Real Potosi (Bolivia) **(Nº19)Augusto Andaveris Iriondo FW 05/05/1979 Club Bolivar (Bolivia) **(Nº20)Roland Raldes Balcazar DF 20/04/1981 Club Destroyers (Bolivia)
