= 1999 South American U-20 Championship =

1999 Sudamericano Sub-20

Tournament details
- Host country: Argentina
- Dates: 5–25 January
- Teams: 10 (from 1 confederation)
- Venue: 2 (in 2 host cities)

Final positions
- Champions: Argentina (3rd title)
- Runners-up: Uruguay
- Third place: Brazil
- Fourth place: Paraguay

Tournament statistics
- Matches played: 35
- Goals scored: 115 (3.29 per match)
- Attendance: 228,113 (6,518 per match)
- Top scorer: (Argentina) Luciano Galletti (9 goals)

The 1999 South American Youth Championship (Sudamericana sub-20) is a football competition contested by all ten U-20 national football teams of CONMEBOL. The tournament was held in Argentina between 5 and 25 January 1999, the 23rd time the competition had been held and the 2nd to take place in the country. Argentina finished undefeated, winning their 3rd trophy.

== Format ==
The teams are separated in two groups of five, and each team plays four matches in a pure round-robin stage. The three top competitors advance to a single final group of six, wherein each team plays five matches. The top four teams in the final group qualify to the 1999 FIFA World Youth Championship.

== Squads ==
For a list of all the squads in the final tournament, see 1999 South American Youth Championship squads.

The following teams entered the tournament:

- Argentina (host)
- Bolivia
- Brazil
- Chile
- Colombia
- Ecuador
- Paraguay
- Peru
- Uruguay
- Venezuela

== First group stage ==
=== Group A ===
Team	Pts	Pld	W	D	L	GF	GA
Argentina	12	4	4	0	0	12	1
Chile	9	4	3	0	1	12	4
Peru	6	4	2	0	2	4	8
Venezuela	3	4	1	0	3	5	14
Ecuador	0	4	0	0	4	3	9

==== Results ====
5 January 1999

Chile	2–0	Ecuador
Neira 27'; Moya 30'

Estadio José María Minella, Mar del Plata
Attendance: 2.000
Referee: Carlos Amarilla (Paraguay)
5 January 1999

Venezuela	1-4	Argentina
Arango 39'		Duscher 64'; Farías 68'; Galletti 70'; Aimar 89'

Estadio José María Minella, Mar del Plata
Attendance: 11.656
Referee: Jorge Larrionda (Uruguay)

7 January 1999

Peru	2–1	Venezuela
Balbin 27', 90'		Sequera 17'

Estadio José María Minella, Mar del Plata
Attendance: 2.000
Referee: Felipe Russi (Colombia)
7 January 1999

Argentina	2–0	Ecuador
Galletti 27', 90'

Estadio José María Minella, Mar del Plata
Attendance: 7.422
Referee: Carlos Eugênio Simon (Brazil)

11 January 1999

Venezuela	0–6	Chile
		Córdova 18', 64'; Neira 43'; Pizarro 75'; García 83'; Gutiérrez 87'

Estadio José María Minella, Mar del Plata
Attendance: 2.000
Referee: Juan Luna (Bolivia)
11 January 1999

Peru	0-2	Argentina
		Aimar 32'; Montenegro 80'

Estadio José María Minella, Mar del Plata
Attendance: 10.600
Referee: Carlos Amarilla (Paraguay)

13 January 1999

Ecuador	1–2	Peru
Bonito 65'		Alamanza 80'; Cordero 88'

Estadio José María Minella, Mar del Plata
Attendance: 2.000
Referee: Jorge Larrionda (Uruguay)
13 January 1999

Argentina	4–0	Chile
Crosa 24'; Galletti 35', 57'; Duscher 85'

Estadio José María Minella, Mar del Plata
Attendance: 13.998
Referee: Felipe Russi (Colombia)

15 January 1999

Chile	4–0	Peru
García 19', 32'; Córdova 49', 78'

Estadio José María Minella, Mar del Plata
Attendance: 1.000
Referee: Carlos Eugênio Simon (Brazil)
15 January 1999

Ecuador	2–3	Venezuela
Mejía 52'; Bonito 63'		Sequera 36'; Chacón 76'; Juan Arango 90+1'

Estadio José María Minella, Mar del Plata
Attendance: 1.000
Referee: Juan Luna (Bolivia)

=== Group B ===
Team	Pts	Pld	W	D	L	GF	GA
Paraguay	10	4	3	1	0	7	3
Brazil	8	4	2	2	0	8	2
Uruguay	7	4	2	1	1	8	3
Colombia	1	4	0	1	3	4	8
Bolivia	1	4	0	1	3	4	15

==== Results ====
6 January 1999

Uruguay	1–0	Colombia
Chevantón 9'

Estadio General San Martín, Tandil
Attendance: 3.200
Referee: Ángel Sánchez (Argentina)
6 January 1999

Bolivia	0–4	Brazil
		Eriberto 4'; Cassio Lincoln 40'; Fábio Aurélio 76'; Edu 90'

Estadio General San Martín, Tandil
Attendance: 2.600
Referee: Jorge Torres (Peru)

8 January 1999

Paraguay	2–1	Bolivia
Santa Cruz 69'; Escobar 80'		García 53'

Estadio General San Martín, Tandil
Attendance: 3.000
Referee: José Carpio (Ecuador)
8 January 1999

Brazil	3–1	Colombia
Matuzalém 18'; Rodrigo Gral 43'; Ronaldinho 64'		Molina 88'

Estadio General San Martín, Tandil
Attendance: 3.000
Referee: Guido Aros (Chile)

10 January 1999

Bolivia	1–7	Uruguay
Aguilera 52'		Pellegrín 10'; Chevantón 21', 33'; Forlán 42'; Canobbio 78'; Carreño 79'; Bueno 88'

Estadio General San Martín, Tandil
Attendance: 2.000
Referee: Luis Solorzáno (Venezuela)
10 January 1999

Paraguay	1–1	Brazil
Santa Cruz 1'		Rodrigo Gral 69'

Estadio General San Martín, Tandil
Attendance: 4.000
Referee: Jorge Torres (Peru)

12 January 1999

Uruguay	0–2	Paraguay
		Cabañas 18'; Da Silva 51'

Estadio General San Martín, Tandil
Attendance: 3.000
Referee: Ángel Sánchez (Argentina)
12 January 1999

Colombia	2–2	Bolivia
Gil 18'; Victoria 31'		Gutiérrez 57'; Apuri 84'

Estadio General San Martín, Tandil
Attendance: 3.000
Referee: Jorge Torres (Peru)

14 January 1999

Colombia	1–2	Paraguay
Díaz 17'		Cabañas 11'; Gavilán 46'

Estadio General San Martín, Tandil
Attendance: 2.100
Referee: Luis Solorzáno (Venezuela)
14 January 1999

Brazil	0–0	Uruguay

Estadio General San Martín, Tandil
Attendance: 2.100
Referee: José Carpio (Ecuador)

== Final group ==
Team	Pts	Pld	W	D	L	GF	GA
Argentina	12	5	4	0	1	9	2
Uruguay	8	5	2	2	1	5	4
Brazil	7	5	2	1	2	14	8
Paraguay	6	5	2	0	3	6	8
Peru	5	5	1	2	2	4	14
Chile	4	5	1	1	3	8	10

17 January	Peru	2–1	Paraguay
	Brazil	2–3	Chile
	Argentina	0–1	Uruguay
19 January	Paraguay	1–3	Brazil
	Chile	1–2	Uruguay
	Peru	0–5	Argentina
21 January	Chile	2–3	Paraguay
	Uruguay	0–0	Peru
	Argentina	2–1	Brazil
23 January	Paraguay	1–0	Uruguay
	Brazil	6–0	Peru
	Chile	0–1	Argentina
25 January	Peru	2–2	Chile
	Uruguay	2–2	Brazil
	Argentina	1–0	Paraguay

1999 South American Youth Championship winners

Argentina
Third title

== Qualification to World Youth Championship ==
The four best performing teams qualified for the 1999 FIFA World Youth Championship.

- Argentina
- Brazil
- Paraguay
- Uruguay

== Goalscorers ==
9 goals

- (Argentina) Luciano Galletti

7 goals

- (Brazil) Rodrigo Gral

5 goals

- (Chile) Nicolás Córdova
- (Brazil) Edu

4 goals

- (Uruguay) Javier Chevantón
- (Chile) Patricio Neira

3 goals

- (Chile) Gamadiel García
- (Chile) David Pizarro
- (Brazil) Ronaldinho
- (Paraguay) Roque Santa Cruz

2 goals

- (Uruguay) Omar Pouso
- (Chile) Rodolfo Moya
- (Argentina) Aldo Duscher
- (Argentina) Pablo Aimar
- (Argentina) Daniel Montenegro
- (Argentina) Germán Rivarola
- (Argentina) Ernesto Farías
- (Venezuela) Juan Arango
- (Venezuela) Leandro Sequera
- (Ecuador) Marco Bonito
- (Peru) Luis Cordero
- (Uruguay) Fernando Carreño
- (Paraguay) Salvador Cabañas
- (Paraguay) Nelson Vera

1 goal

- (Peru) Rubén Alamanza
- (Argentina) Fernando Crosa
- (Ecuador) Líder Mejía
- (Venezuela) Gerzon Chacón
- (Brazil) Eriberto
- (Brazil) Cassio Lincoln
- (Brazil) Fábio Aurélio
- (Bolivia) Ronald García
- (Brazil) Matuzalém
- (Colombia) Mauricio Molina
- (Uruguay) César Pellegrín
- (Uruguay) Diego Forlán
- (Bolivia) Marcos Aguilera
- (Uruguay) Fabián Canobbio
- (Uruguay) Carlos Bueno
- (Paraguay) Paulo da Silva
- (Colombia) Cristian Gil

1 goal (cont.)

- (Peru) Oswaldo Carrión
- (Paraguay) Nelson Cuevas
- (Brazil) Marcio Carioca
- (Paraguay) Rubén Maldonado
- (Brazil) Marcinho
- (Brazil) Marcio Carioca
- (Argentina) Esteban Cambiasso
- (Chile) Milovan Mirosevic
- (Brazil) Marcio Carioca
- (Paraguay) Sergio Fernandez
- (Brazil) Maricá
- (Peru) Piero Alva
- (Peru) Pedro Ascoy
- (Uruguay) Gonzalo Sorondo
- (Colombia) Gustavo Victoria
- (Bolivia) Ronald Gutiérrez
- (Bolivia) Ferdy Apuri
- (Colombia) Jeffrey Díaz

== Notes ==
- Argentina and Uruguay were looking to finish in the top 4 in order to qualify for the World Youth Championship, a competition which the two sides have thoroughly dominated, having won 9 of the 16 World Youth titles between them.
