= Asprilla =

Asprilla is a surname of Spanish origin. Notable people with the surname include:

- Avelino Asprilla (born 1981), Panamanian baseball player
- Carlos Asprilla (born 1970), Colombian footballer
- Chamell Asprilla (born 1998), Panamanian footballer
- Dairon Asprilla (born 1992), Colombian footballer
- Danilo Asprilla (born 1989), Colombian footballer
- Faustino Asprilla (born 1969), Colombian footballer
- Jimmy Asprilla (born 1980), Colombian footballer
- Leidy Asprilla (1997–2019), Colombian footballer
- Leonidas Asprilla (born 1952), Colombian boxer
- Lewis Asprilla (born 1972), Colombian long-jumper
- Luis Asprilla (born 1977), Colombian footballer
- Luis Carlos Asprilla (born 1976), Colombian footballer
- Nestor Asprilla (born 1986), Colombian footballer
- Yáser Asprilla (born 2003), Colombian footballer
- Yuber Asprilla (born 1992), Colombian footballer

== See also ==
- Asprilla (footballer, born 1981) (born Cristiano Luís Rodrigues in 1981), Brazilian footballer
- Óscar Díaz (Colombian footballer), (born Óscar Díaz Asprilla in 1972), Colombian footballer
