= Luis Cordero =

Luis Cordero may refer to:

- Luis Cordero Crespo (1833–1912), Ecuadoran politician, president in 1892–1895
- Luis Cordero Vega (born 1972), Chilean politician
- Luis Cordero (Peruvian footballer) (born 1981)
