= Torneos de Verano (Argentina) =

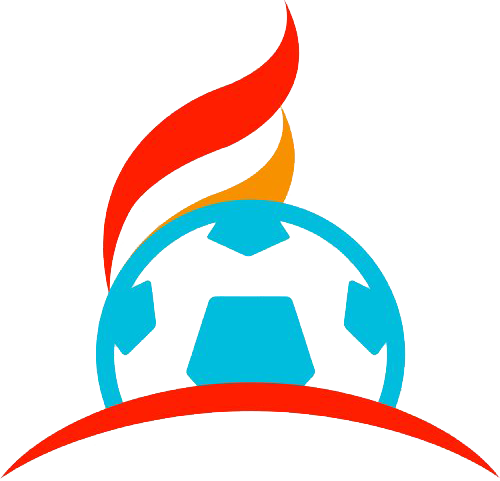
- Organiser(s): Liga Marplatense; Torneos y Competencias
- Founded: 1968
- Abolished: 2023; 3 years ago
- Region: Argentina
- Most championships: Boca Juniors (48)
- Broadcasters: ESPN Premium; TNT Sports; Star+

Torneos de Verano (Spanish for "Summer Tournaments") were a series of short friendly football pre-season tournaments held during the southern summer in Argentina every year, usually in January and February. They serve as preparation for the teams for the coming season; however, as the years have gone by, the competitiveness in the tournaments has increased, and they are now considered important competitions. This is clearly reflected in the high crowd attendance for the games.

Since the first edition in 1968, the Torneos de Verano have been played uninterrupted, then being expanded to other cities of Argentina such as Córdoba, Mendoza, Rosario, Salta and Tandil.

== History ==
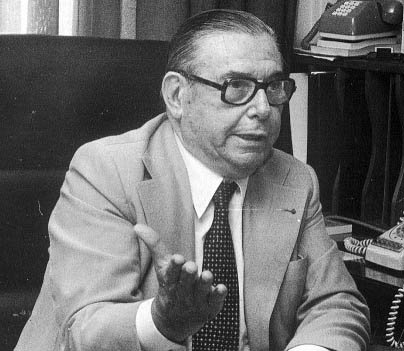
Alberto J. Armando, president of Boca Juniors, was the main promoter of the creation of a summer tournament in Mar del Plata

The first competition was established by then Boca Juniors president Alberto Armando, who had shown his interest in moving the main Primera División teams to the city of Mar del Plata, the biggest seaside beach resort in Argentina. As a result, two competitions were held in the city in 1968, with the games played at General San Martín Stadium, the main venue of the city by then. The first of them, "Copa Libertad" was held in January 1968, with San Lorenzo as winner of a tournament also contested by Boca Juniors, Rosario Central and Uruguayan side Peñarol.

Another competition, "Copa Ciudad de Mar del Plata", was held in February. The Hungarian team Vasas – which the de facto government led by Juan Carlos Onganía did not want to allow to enter the country due to Hungary being under communist rule – was the winner after beating favorites Racing Club de Avellaneda (current Intercontinental champion) and River Plate (3–0 in the final).

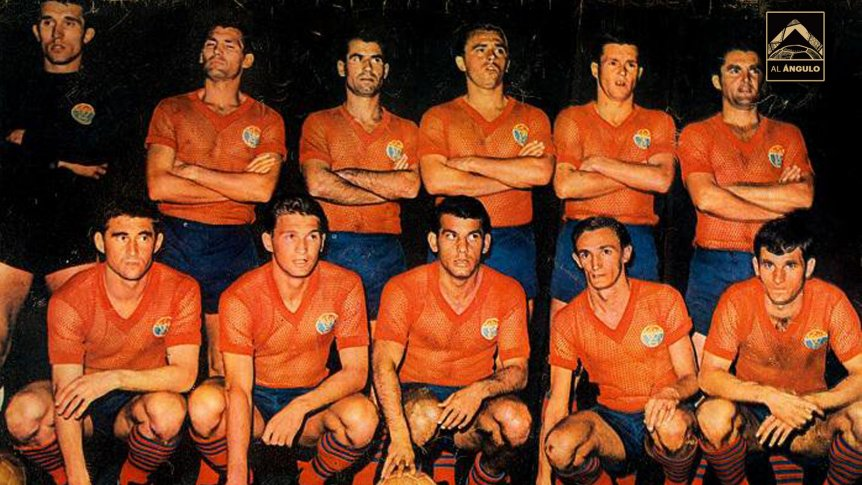
Hungarian team Vasas SC, the first non-Argentine team to win a summer competition in 1968

In 1969 the "Copa de Oro" had its inaugural season as a friendly tournament between Argentine and foreign clubs. In its first edition, Brazilian Palmeiras, Austrian SK Rapid Wien, Hungarian MTK Budapest and Czechoslovak Slovan Bratislava participated of the tournament, together with Boca Juniors, Estudiantes L.P., and the Mar del Plata XI team. Later editions only had Brazilian, Uruguayan or Paraguayan teams, with occasional European clubs or national teams, mainly Hungary and Czechoslovakia. Since the 1980s it has only 3 to 5 Argentine teams, which varied from year to year, but included the Big Five (Boca Juniors, Independiente, Racing, River Plate and San Lorenzo) and sometimes Estudiantes and Vélez Sársfield. Even though they coexisted for several years, the "Copa Ciudad de Mar del Plata" eventually replaced the Copa de Oro as the most important summer tournament. The "Torneo Pentagonal de Verano" (previously "Copa de Verano"), in which the Big Five participate, was the most important tournament and usually took place in Mar del Plata until 2009. Copa de Oro is the longest competition, with 40 editions held between 1969 and 2017.

When Estadio José María Minella was built for the 1978 FIFA World Cup, summer competitions moved to that venue since 1979, leaving General San Martín Stadium for regional competitions only, until it was demolished in 1996.

In January 1995, Maradona made his debut as manager of Racing in a Torneo de Verano match v arch-rival Independiente. Maradona was still banned by FIFA and he had arrived in Racing Club to coach the team until the term of the ban expired so he could resume his career as player in the club. Nevertheless, the tenure of Maradona on Racing did not last so long (only 11 matches) before leaving the club.

The "Copa Desafío" and Copa Revancha" are currently one-match cups disputed only between Boca Juniors and River Plate. Other cups are organized by cities or sponsors, but their continuity is more irregular. Some are organized without any of the Big Five. For instance, the "Ciudad de Córdoba" includes clubs from the Córdoba Province, and occasionally some from Santa Fe Province; and the "Copa Ciudad de Tandil" or "Copa del Sur" includes teams from the southern area of the Gran Buenos Aires: Arsenal, Quilmes, Lanús, Gimnasia y Esgrima (LP), and occasionally a guest like Rosario Central.

After several years of being hosted in San Juan, in 2022 the seat of summer tournaments moved to La Plata, with only one competition held, being named simply "Torneo de Verano". It was contested by six teams, four from Argentina and two from Chile.

== Famous matches ==
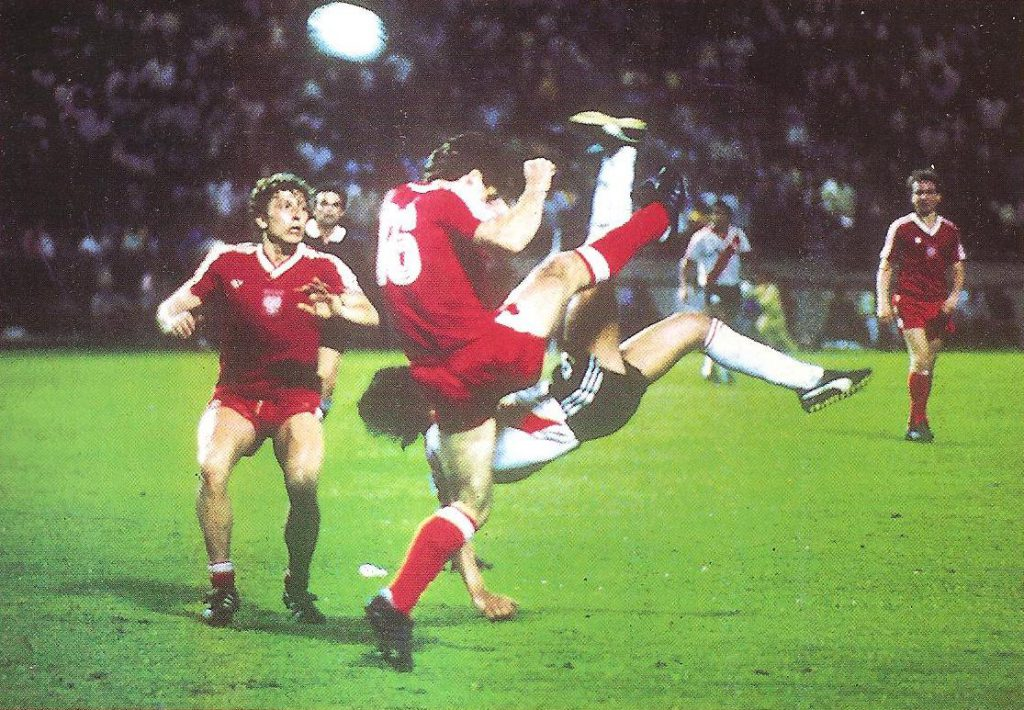
Enzo Francescoli goes for a bicycle kick to score the winning goal v Poland, February 1986

The summer tournaments in Argentina have had some memorable matches during their more than 50 years of existence. The Hungarian team Vasas – which the de facto government led by Juan Carlos Onganía did not want to allow to enter the country due to Hungary being under communist rule – was the winner after beating favorites Racing Club de Avellaneda (current Intercontinental champion) and River Plate (3–0 in the final).

In 1979, River Plate beat Czechoslovakia national team (then European champions and touring on Argentina) 4–1. Two years later, Talleres de Córdoba defeated Hungary national team 3–0 in Mar del Plata. In 1986, River Plate beat Poland national team 4–2, scoring two goals in the last three minutes of the match. Enzo Francescoli scored three goals, the last of them with a bicycle kick.

The summer of 1999 saw how Boca Juniors easily beat River Plate 3–0 in the Copa Revancha match at Estadio Malvinas Argentinas, Mendoza, with three goals scored by Martín Palermo. In 2000, Boca beat River 2–1, with a starting lineup that included ten players from the youth academy. That defeat caused manager Ramón Díaz resigned after that match.

In Copa Luis Nofal, held on January 31, 2015, in Estadio Malvinas Argentinas, Boca Juniors thrashed River Plate 5–0, achieving the largest win in a friendly Superclàsico.

== Non-Argentine teams ==
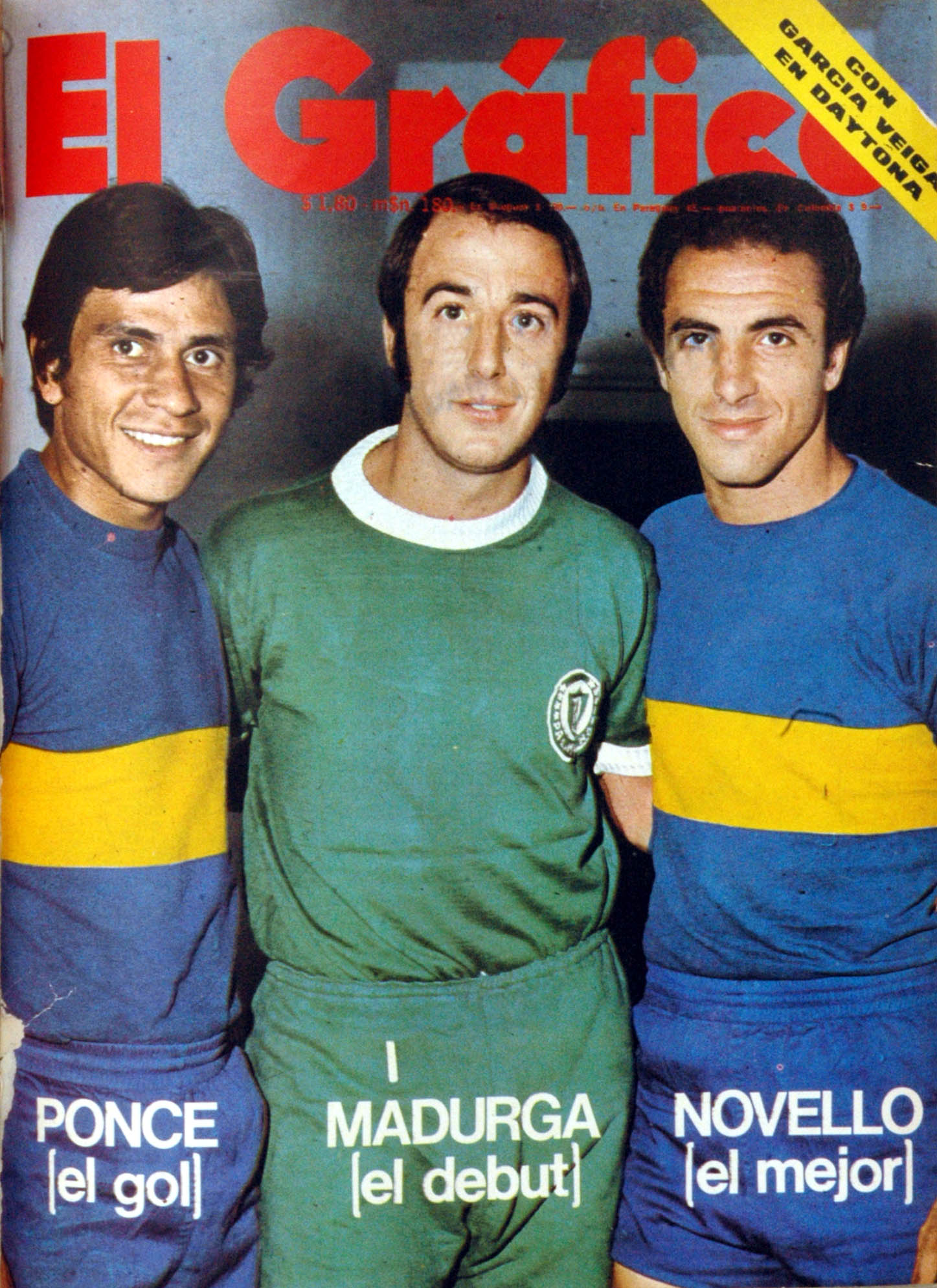
Fltr: Ramón Ponce, Norberto Madurga, and Nicolás Novello. Brazilian club Palmeiras visited Argentina in 1972 to play the "Copa del Atlántico" v Boca Juniors

Since the inception of Copa Libertad, the first summer tournament held in Mar del Plata, many South American and European (club and national teams) have participated in Torneos de Verano. 1968 Copa Libertad was contested by Uruguayan side Peñarol. For the 1969 Copa de Oro, Austrian Rapid Wien, Hungarians Slovan Bratislava and MTK Budapest and Brazilian Palmeiras arrived in Mar del Plata to compete.

European teams contesting the other tournament organised in 1968, "Copa Ciudad de Mar del Plata", were Hungarian club Vasas (which would be the winner) and the Czechoslovakia national team. A Mexican team, Necaxa, was invited for the 1970 "Copa de Oro", remaining as the only team from that country to have participated in Argentine summer competitions. The following editions would be contested only by Argentine clubs until 1975, when Paraguayan Olimpia took part.

Czechoslovakia returned to Argentina for the 1979 edition of Copa de Oro. The Czech combined, that had won the European Nations Cup in 1975, finished 2nd. to River Plate. Brazilian club Internacional was the other non-Argentine team that took part of the friendly competition. One year later, the Hungary B national team was invited to participate. The side finished 2nd. to Indpendiente.

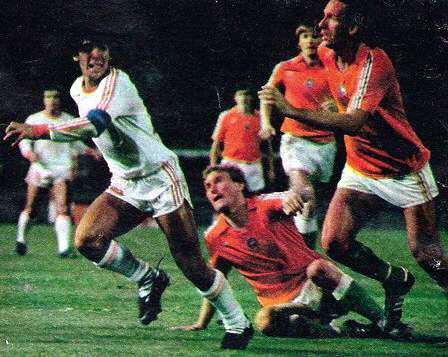
Diego Maradona of Argentinos Juniors (in white kit) in the match v Hungary national team, 1981

Hungary also took part of the 1981 edition, playing with its main team, but the squad made a poor performance, with three loses and a draw, finishing last. Following the practise initiated, another East Europe side invited to summer tournaments was Poland in 1986. German side Köln participated in 1988, being the last participation of a European team to date.

Since 2009, South American teams have been often guests to summer tournaments. In 2009, Club Libertad (Paraguay), San Martín de Porres (Peru) and Defensor Sporting (Uruguay) took part in Copa Santa Fe, a regional competition in Santa Fe Province. In the inaugural season of Copa Ciudad de Rosario in 2011, Alianza Lima (Peru) and Universidad Católica (Chile) were the guest teams. The next edition, FBC Melgar from Peru was the only guest team.

It was not until 2020 when a non-Argentine team took part of summer tournaments again. In that year, several South American sides contested several friendly matches or competitions. Uruguayan club Nacional made its debut in Torneos de Verano winning the Copa Desafío, while Peruvian club Universitario and Club Athletico Paranaense (Brazil) participated in Copa San Juan (in the homonymous city). On the other side, Liverpool (Uruguay) took part of "Copa Wanora Romero" (Note: Named in honor of Miguel Antonio Romero (nicknamed Wanora, 1934–2017), all-time topscorer for Talleres de Córdoba.) in Córdoba.

After a hiatus due to COVID-19 pandemic in Argentina in 2021, the summer tournaments came back in 2022 with a unique competition held in Estadio Jorge Luis Hirschi of Estudiantes de La Plata. Chilean sides Universidad de Chile and Colo-Colo took part of the tournament along with local clubs Boca Juniors, Independiente, and San Lorenzo.

== List of champions ==
As of January 2023

Year	Tournament	Champion	Cities
1968	Copa Libertad	(Argentina) San Lorenzo (1)	Mar del Plata
1968	Ciudad de Mar del Plata	(Hungary) Vasas SC (1)	Mar del Plata
1969	Copa de Oro	(Argentina) Boca Juniors (1)	Mar del Plata
1970	Copa de Oro	(Argentina) Racing (1)	Mar del Plata
1971	Copa de Oro	(Argentina) Boca Juniors (2)	Mar del Plata
1972	Copa del Atlántico	(Brazil) Palmeiras (1)	Mar del Plata
1973	Copa de Oro	(Argentina) San Lorenzo (2)	Mar del Plata
1974	Copa de Oro	(Abandoned)	Mar del Plata
1975	Copa de Oro	(Argentina) Boca Juniors (3)	Mar del Plata
1977	Copa de Oro	Argentina national team (1)	Mar del Plata
1978	Copa de Oro	(Argentina) Boca Juniors (4)	Mar del Plata
1979	Torneo Mar del Plata	(Argentina) River Plate (1)	Mar del Plata
1980	Copa de Oro	(Argentina) Independiente (1)	Mar del Plata
1981	Copa de Oro	(Argentina) Independiente (2)	Mar del Plata
1981	Copa de Oro	(Argentina) Talleres (C) (1)	Córdoba
1982	Copa de Oro	(Argentina) River Plate (2)	Mar del Plata
1983	Copa de Oro	(Argentina) Boca Juniors (5)	Mar del Plata
1984	Copa de Oro	(Argentina) Boca Juniors (6)	Mar del Plata
1985	Copa de Oro	(Argentina) Independiente (3)	Mar del Plata
1986	Copa de Oro	(Argentina) River Plate (3)	Mar del Plata
1986	Copa de Oro II	(Argentina) River Plate (4)	Mar del Plata
1987	Ciudad de Mar del Plata	(Argentina) Boca Juniors (7)	Mar del Plata
1987	Munic. Gral. Pueyrredón	(Argentina) River Plate (5)	Mar del Plata
1987	Copa de Oro	(Argentina) Boca Juniors (8)	Mar del Plata
1988	Ciudad Mar del Plata	(Argentina) River Plate (6)	Mar del Plata
1988	Copa de Oro	(Argentina) Boca Juniors (9)	Mar del Plata
1989	70º Aniv. El Gráfico	(Uruguay) Nacional (1)	Mar del Plata
1989	Copa de Oro	(Argentina) River Plate (7)	Mar del Plata
1990	Ciudad de Mar del Plata	(Argentina) River Plate (8)	Mar del Plata
1990	Copa de Oro	(Argentina) Boca Juniors (10)	Mar del Plata
1991	Copa de Oro	(Argentina) Boca Juniors (11)	Mar del Plata
1991	Ciudad de Mar del Plata	(Argentina) Boca Juniors (12)	Mar del Plata
1991	Racimo de Oro	(Argentina) Newell's Old Boys (1)	Mendoza
1991	Ciudad de Córdoba	(Argentina) Belgrano (1)	Córdoba
1991	Ciudad de Neuquén	(Argentina) Lanús (1)	Neuquén
1992	Copa de Oro	(Argentina) San Lorenzo (2)	Mar del Plata
1992	Ciudad de Mar del Plata	(Argentina) Boca Juniors (13)	Mar del Plata
1992	Copa Revancha	(Argentina) Boca Juniors (14)	Mar del Plata
1993	Copa de Oro	(Argentina) Boca Juniors (15)	Mar del Plata
1993	Copa Desafío	(Argentina) Boca Juniors (16)	Mar del Plata
1993	Ciudad de Mar del Plata	(Argentina) San Lorenzo (3)	Mar del Plata
1993	Copa Revancha	(Argentina) River Plate (9)	Mar del Plata
1993	Ciudad de Córdoba	(Argentina) Belgrano (2)	Córdoba
1993	Copa Desafío (Cba)	(Argentina) Belgrano (3)	Córdoba
1994	Copa de Oro	(Argentina) San Lorenzo (4)	Mendoza
1994	Copa Desafío	(Argentina) Boca Juniors (17)	Mendoza
1994	Copa Revancha	(Argentina) Boca Juniors (18)	Mendoza
1994	Copa 90o. Aniv. Diario La Voz	(Argentina) Belgrano (4)	Córdoba
1995	Copa de Oro	(Argentina) River Plate (10)	Mar del Plata
1995	Ciudad de Mar del Plata	(Argentina) San Lorenzo (5)	Mar del Plata
1995	Copa Revancha	(Argentina) River Plate (11)	Mar del Plata
1995	Copa de Oro	(Argentina) Boca Juniors (19)	Mendoza
1995	Copa Desafío	(Argentina) River Plate (12)	Mendoza
1995	Provincia de Mendoza	(Argentina) Independiente (4)	Mendoza
1996	Copa de Oro	(Argentina) Independiente (5)	Mar del Plata
1996	Ciudad de Mar del Plata	(Argentina) Vélez Sarsfield	Mar del Plata
1996	Copa Revancha	(Argentina) River Plate (13)	Mar del Plata
1996	Copa de Oro	(Argentina) San Lorenzo (6)	Mendoza
1996	Copa Desafío	(Argentina) River Plate (14)	Mendoza
1996	Provincia de Mendoza	(Argentina) Racing (3)	Mendoza
1997	Copa de Oro	(Argentina) Independiente (6)	Mar del Plata
1997	Ciudad de Mar del Plata	(Argentina) San Lorenzo (7)	Mar del Plata
1997	Copa Revancha	(Argentina) River Plate (15)	Mar del Plata
1997	Copa de Oro	(Argentina) River Plate (16)	Mendoza
1997	Copa Desafío	(Argentina) Boca Juniors (20)	Mendoza
1997	Provincia de Mendoza	(Argentina) Racing (4)	Mendoza
1998	Copa de Oro	(Argentina) Racing (5)	Mar del Plata
1998	Copa Cdad. Mar del Plata	(Argentina) San Lorenzo (8)	Mar del Plata
1998	Copa Desafio	(Argentina) Boca Juniors (21)	Mar del Plata
1998	Copa de Oro	(Argentina) Vélez Sarsfield	Mendoza
1998	Copa Pcia. Mendoza	(Argentina) Boca Juniors (22)	Mendoza
1998	Copa Revancha	(Argentina) Boca Juniors (23)	Mendoza
1999	Copa de Oro	(Argentina) San Lorenzo (9)	Mar del Plata
1999	Ciudad de Mar del Plata	(Argentina) Racing (6)	Mar del Plata
1999	Copa Desafío	(Argentina) Boca Juniors (24)	Mar del Plata
1999	Copa de Oro	(Argentina) Independiente (7)	Mendoza
1999	Provincia de Mendoza	(Argentina) San Lorenzo (10)	Mendoza
1999	Copa Revancha	(Argentina) Boca Juniors (25)	Mendoza
1999	Ciudad de Córdoba	(Argentina) Rosario Central (2)	Córdoba
1999	Prov. de Buenos Aires	(Argentina) Huracán (1)	La Plata
2000	Copa de Oro	(Argentina) Boca Juniors (26)	Mar del Plata
2000	Ciudad de Mar del Plata	(Argentina) Boca Juniors (27)	Mar del Plata
2000	Ciudad de Córdoba	(Argentina) River Plate (17)	Córdoba
2001	Copa Personal	(Argentina) Boca Juniors (28)	Mar del Plata
2001	Copa Personal	(Argentina) Boca Juniors (29)	Mendoza
2001	Ciudad de Córdoba	(Argentina) Talleres (C)	Córdoba
2002	Ciudad de Mar del Plata	(Argentina) Racing (7)	Mar del Plata
2002	Copa Desafío	(Argentina) River Plate (18)	Mendoza
2002	Copa Revancha	(Argentina) River Plate (19)	Mendoza
2002	Copa Revancha	(Argentina) Boca Juniors (30)	Mar del Plata
2002	Ciudad de Córdoba	(Argentina) Belgrano (5)	Córdoba
2002	Torneo Neuquén/Salta	(Argentina) Independiente (8)	Neuquén, Salta
2003	Copa Desafío	(Argentina) Boca Juniors (31)	Mar del Plata
2003	Copa de Verano	(Argentina) Boca Juniors (32)	Salta
2003	Copa Revancha	(Argentina) Boca Juniors (33)	Mendoza
2004	Pentagonal de Verano	(Argentina) San Lorenzo (11)	Mar del Plata, Salta, Mendoza
2004	Ciudad de Mar del Plata	(Argentina) Independiente (9)	Mar del Plata
2004	Copa Revancha	(Argentina) River Plate (20)	Mendoza
2005	Pentagonal de Verano	(Argentina) San Lorenzo (12)	Mar del Plata, Salta, Mendoza
2005	Copa Revancha	(Argentina) Boca Juniors (34)	Mendoza
2005	Ciudad de Salta	(Argentina) Independiente (10)	Salta
2005	Ciudad de Tandil	(Argentina) Arsenal	Tandil
2006	Pentagonal de Verano	(Argentina) Boca Juniors (35)	Mar del Plata, Salta
2006	Copa Desafío	(Argentina) River Plate (21)	Salta
2006	Ciudad de Mar del Plata	(Argentina) Estudiantes (LP) (1)	Mar del Plata
2006	Ciudad de Tandil	(Argentina) Arsenal	Tandil
2006	Copa Centenario	(Argentina) Estudiantes (LP) (2)	Mar del Plata
2007	Pentagonal de Verano	(Argentina) River Plate (22)	Mar del Plata, Salta
2007	Copa Desafío	(Argentina) River Plate (23)	Mar del Plata
2007	Copa Revancha	(Argentina) River Plate (24)	Mendoza
2007	Ciudad de Tandil	(Argentina) Banfield (2)	Tandil
2007	Ciudad de Córdoba	(Argentina) Vélez Sarsfield	Córdoba
2008	Pentagonal de Verano	(Argentina) River Plate (25)	Mar del Plata, Salta, Mendoza
2008	Copa Revancha	(Argentina) River Plate (26)	Mendoza
2008	Ciudad de Tandil	(Argentina) Olimpo	Tandil
2008	Provincia de Salta	(Argentina) Independiente (11)	Salta
2008	Ciudad de Buenos Aires	(Argentina) Lanús (2)	Buenos Aires
2009	Pentagonal de Verano	(Argentina) Boca Juniors (36)	Mar del Plata, Salta, Mendoza
2009	Ciudad de Tandil	(Argentina) Godoy Cruz (1)	Tandil
2009	Ciudad de Mar del Plata	(Argentina) Gimnasia y Esgrima (LP) (1)	Mar del Plata
2009	Ciudad de Córdoba	(Argentina) Lanús (3)	Córdoba
2009	Copa Revancha	(Argentina) Boca Juniors (37)	Mendoza
2010	Triangular de Mar del Plata	(Argentina) Estudiantes (LP) (3)	Mar del Plata
2010	Triangular de Salta	(Argentina) Independiente (12)	Salta
2010	Copa Desafío	(Argentina) River Plate (27)	Mar del Plata
2010	Ciudad de Mar del Plata	(Argentina) Racing (8)	Mar del Plata
2010	Copa Revancha	(Argentina) River Plate (28)	Mendoza
2010	Ciudad de Rosario	(Argentina) Newell's Old Boys (2)	Rosario
2011	Copa de Oro	(Argentina) Boca Juniors (38)	Mar del Plata
2011	Ciudad de Mar del Plata	(Argentina) Estudiantes (LP) (4)	Mar del Plata
2011	Ciudad de Mendoza	(Argentina) San Lorenzo (13)	Mendoza
2011	Ciudad de Rosario	(Peru) Alianza Lima	Rosario
2011	Copa Luis Nofal	(Argentina) Boca Juniors (39)	Mar del Plata, Mendoza
2011	Ciudad de Quilmes	(Argentina) Quilmes	Quilmes
2012	Copa de Oro	(Argentina) Independiente (13)	Mar del Plata
2012	Ciudad de Mar del Plata	(Argentina) River Plate (29)	Mar del Plata
2012	Ciudad de Mendoza	(Argentina) Godoy Cruz (2)	Mendoza
2012	100° Aniversario La Gazeta	(Argentina) Atlético Tucumán	Tucumán
2012	Ciudad de Rosario	(Argentina) Atlético de Rafaela	Rosario
2012	Provincia de Buenos Aires	(Argentina) Racing (9)	Buenos Aires
2012	Copa San Juan Fraterno	(Argentina) San Martín (SJ)	San Juan
2012	Copa Luis Nofal	(Argentina) Boca Juniors (40)	Mendoza
2012	Copa Banco Columbia	(Argentina) Newell's Old Boys (3)	Rosario
2013	Centenario de la Liga Marplatense	(Argentina) Racing (10)	Mar del Plata
2013	Provincia de Córdoba	(Argentina) Belgrano (6)	Córdoba
2013	Copa Nuevo Banco de Santa Fe	(Not held) (Note: A two-match series between Rosario Central and Newell's Old Boys was to be played, but the first game (at Estadio Marcelo Bielsa) was cancelled due to a riot outside the stadium, where Newell's fans fought Rosario policemen. Neither of the programmed games was played.)	Rosario
2013	Copa Luis Nofal	(Argentina) Boca Juniors (41)	Mendoza
2013	Copa BBVA	(Argentina) River Plate (30)	Córdoba
2014	Copa de Oro	(Argentina) Estudiantes (LP) (5)	Mar del Plata
2014	Cdad. Mar del Plata	(Argentina) Racing (11)	Mar del Plata
2014	Provincia de Córdoba	(Argentina) Belgrano (7)	Córdoba
2014	Copa BBVA	(Argentina) River Plate (31)	Mendoza
2014	Copa Luis Nofal	(Argentina) River Plate (32)	Mendoza
2014	Amistad Cdad. La Plata	(Argentina) Gimnasia y Esgrima (LP) (2)	La Plata
2015	Copa de Oro	(Argentina) River Plate (33)	Mar del Plata
2015	Cdad. Mar del Plata	(Argentina) Racing (12)	Mar del Plata
2015	Cdad. Avellaneda	(Argentina) Racing (13)	Mar del Plata
2015	Cdad. La Plata	(Argentina) Estudiantes (LP) (6)	Mar del Plata
2015	Julio H. Grondona	(Argentina) Boca Juniors (42)	Mar del Plata
2015	Copa Luis Nofal	(Argentina) Boca Juniors (43)	Mendoza
2016	Cdad. Buenos Aires	(Argentina) Huracán (2)	Mar del Plata
2016	Cdad. Mar del Plata	(Argentina) Independiente (14)	Mar del Plata
2016	Copa de Oro	(Argentina) Estudiantes (LP) (7)	Mar del Plata
2016	Cdad. Avellaneda	(Argentina) Racing (14)	Mar del Plata
2016	Copa Luis Nofal	(Argentina) River Plate (34)	Mar del Plata, Mendoza (Note: Two-matches series, won both by River Plate.)
2016	Cdad. La Plata	(Argentina) Estudiantes (LP) (8)	Mar del Plata
2016	Copa Amistad	(Argentina) Aldosivi (1)	Mar del Plata
2017	Copa Clásico del Sur	(Argentina) Banfield (1)	Mar del Plata
2017	Copa Desafío	(Argentina) Talleres (C)	Mar del Plata
2017	Cdad. de Mar del Plata	(Argentina) Aldosivi (2)	Mar del Plata
2017	Provincia de Salta	(Argentina) Racing (15)	Salta
2017	Copa de Oro	(Argentina) Boca Juniors (44)	Mar del Plata
2017	Copa Luis B. Nofal	(Argentina) River Plate (35)	Mar del Plata
2017	Copa Revancha	(Argentina) Racing (16)	Mar del Plata
2018	Copa de Verano I (Note: Named "Schneider" for sponsorship reasons.) (Note: Played as single matches, with each of them awarding a champion.)	(Argentina) San Lorenzo (14)	Mar del Plata
2018	Copa de Verano II	(Argentina) Huracán (3)	Mar del Plata
2018	Copa Ciudad de Salta	(Argentina) Atlético Tucumán	Rosario
2018	Copa Orbis	(Argentina) San Lorenzo (15)	Mar del Plata
2018	Copa de Verano III	(Argentina) Gimnasia y Esgrima (LP) (3)	Mar del Plata
2018	Copa Ciudad de Santa Fe	(Argentina) Rosario Central (1)	Rosario
2018	Copa Ciudad de Mendoza	(Argentina) Godoy Cruz (3)	Mendoza
2018	Copa de Verano IV	(Argentina) Aldosivi (3)	Mar del Plata
2018	Copa de Verano V	(Argentina) Temperley (1)	Mar del Plata
2018	Copa de Verano VI	(Argentina) Newell's Old Boys (4)	Mar del Plata
2018	Copa de Verano VII	(Argentina) Huracán (4)	Mar del Plata
2018	Copa de Verano VIII	(Argentina) Independiente (15)	Mar del Plata
2018	Copa de Verano IX	(Argentina) San Lorenzo (16)	Mar del Plata
2018	Copa de Verano X	(Argentina) River Plate (36)	Mar del Plata
2019	Copa de Verano I	(Argentina) Talleres (C)	Mar del Plata
2019	Copa de Verano II	(Argentina) Belgrano (8)	Mar del Plata
2019	Copa de Verano III	(Argentina) Gimnasia y Esgrima (LP) (4)	Mar del Plata
2019	Copa de Verano IV	(Argentina) River Plate (37)	Mar del Plata
2019	Copa de Verano V	(Argentina) Unión	Mar del Plata
2019	Copa de Verano VI	(Argentina) Independiente (16)	Mar del Plata
2019	Copa de Verano VII	(Argentina) Racing (17)	Mar del Plata
2019	Copa Jorge Mignini	(Argentina) Boca Juniors (45)	Mar del Plata
2019	Copa Ciudad de Cordoba	(Argentina) Talleres (C)	Córdoba
2020	Copa Desafío	(Uruguay) Nacional (2)	Maldonado
2020	Copa San Juan I (Note: Similar format to the tournament held in Mar del Plata in 2018, now held in San Juan.)	(Argentina) Talleres (C)	San Juan
2020	Copa San Juan II	(Peru) Universitario (1)	San Juan
2020	Copa San Juan III	(Argentina) Racing (18)	San Juan
2020	Copa San Juan IV	(Argentina) Boca Juniors (46)	San Juan
2020	Copa Wanora Romero	(Argentina) Talleres (C)	Córdoba
2020	Copa San Juan V	(Argentina) Boca Juniors (47)	San Juan
2021	(not held due to COVID-19 pandemic)		
2022	Torneo de Verano	(Argentina) Boca Juniors (48)	La Plata
2022	Cuadrangular de Salta	(Argentina) Central Norte	Salta
2022	Copa Córdoba	(Argentina) Talleres (C) (Argentina) Racing (C)	Córdoba
2023	Torneo de Verano	(Argentina) Independiente (17)	San Juan
2023	Cuadrangular de Salta	(Argentina) Central Norte	Salta
2023	Copa Clásicos de Córdoba I	(Argentina) Talleres (C)	Córdoba
2023	Copa Clásicos de Córdoba II	(Argentina) Racing (C)	Córdoba
2023	Copa Clásicos de Córdoba III	(Argentina) Sportivo Belgrano	Córdoba

== Titles by team ==
Club	Titles
(Argentina) Boca Juniors	48
(Argentina) River Plate	37
(Argentina) Racing	18
(Argentina) Independiente	17
(Argentina) San Lorenzo	16
(Argentina) Estudiantes (LP)	8
(Argentina) Talleres (C)	7
(Argentina) Vélez Sarsfield	7
(Argentina) Newell's Old Boys	4
(Argentina) Belgrano (C)	4
(Argentina) Gimnasia y Esgrima (LP)	4
(Argentina) Huracán	4
(Argentina) Aldosivi	3
(Argentina) Lanús	3
(Argentina) Godoy Cruz	3
(Uruguay) Nacional	2
(Argentina) Rosario Central	2
(Brazil) Palmeiras	1
(Peru) Alianza Lima	1
(Peru) Universitario	1
(Hungary) Vasas SC	1
