= Allan Cipriani =

Brazilian footballer

Personal information
- Full name: Allan Patrick Cabral Cipriani
- Date of birth: 30 January 1979 (age 47)
- Place of birth: Promissão, Brazil
- Position: Goalkeeper

Youth career
- 1995–2000: São Paulo

Senior career*
| Years | Team | Apps | (Gls) |
| 2000 | São Paulo | | |
| 2000 | → Náutico (loan) | | |
| 2001 | Juventus-AC | | |
| 2002 | Ceará | | |
| 2003–2004 | Mataró | | |
| 2006–2007 | CE Sant Celoni | | |
| 2007–2008 | Granollers | | |

International career
| 1999 | Brazil U20 | | |
- * Club domestic league appearances and goals

Allan Patrick Cabral Cipriani (born 30 January 1979), better known as Allan Cipriani or Allan, is a Brazilian former professional footballer who played as a goalkeeper.

== Career ==
Champion of the 2000 Copa SP and part of the 1999 South American U-20 Championship squad, Allan was seen with a lot of potential. However, he ended up not being used in the main team, and was negotiated with smaller clubs in Brazil. He was part of the state champion Ceará squad in 2002, and played for teams in Europe, especially in the Catalonia region. In February 2005 he had a failed trial with Norwegian club Fredrikstad at La Manga.

== Honours ==
São Paulo

- Copa São Paulo de Futebol Jr.: 2000

Ceará

- Campeonato Cearense: 2002
