= Héctor Benítez (footballer) =

Paraguayan footballer (born 1980)

Personal information
- Full name: Héctor Darío Benítez Hoppe
- Date of birth: 5 January 1980 (age 46)
- Place of birth: Asunción, Paraguay
- Height: 1.83 m (6 ft 0 in)
- Position: Defender

Senior career*
Years	Team	Apps	(Gls)
2004–2006	Libertad		
2006	Nacional		
2007	Concepción		
2008–2009	Olimpia		
2010	Nacional		
- * Club domestic league appearances and goals

Héctor Darío Benítez Hoppe (born 5 January 1980) is a Paraguayan former professional footballer who played as a defender..

He played for Nacional.
