= Márcio Carioca =

Brazilian footballer

Personal information
- Full name: Márcio Gesteira da Silva
- Date of birth: 2 May 1983 (age 43)
- Place of birth: Rio de Janeiro, Brazil
- Height: 1.79 m (5 ft 10 in)
- Position: Striker

Team information
- Current team: São Gonçalo-EC

Youth career
- 2003–2004: Flamengo

Senior career*
Years	Team	Apps	(Gls)
2004–2005	Boca Júnior	24	(20)
2005	→ Itabaiana (loan)	8	(3)
2006	Vitória-ES	12	(3)
2007	Ceará	12	(6)
2007–2008	Paços de Ferreira		
2010	Guarany de Sobral		
2011	Mesquita		
2011	CSA		
2011	Guarani de Juazeiro		
2011	Treze		
2012–2015	Al-Ittihad (Ibb)		
2015	Resende		
2016–	São Gonçalo-EC		
- * Club domestic league appearances and goals

Márcio Gesteira da Silva also known as Márcio Carioca (born May 2, 1983 in Rio de Janeiro, Brazil) is a Brazilian football player.

His strength on the ball, accurate finishing and pace made him a well known name in the northern states of Brazil. He enjoyed success at Brazilian side Ceara, before moving to Portuguese side Paços de Ferreira on a two-year deal. On February 1, 2008 he was released by the club.

In 2008, he trialled with Australian A-League club Queensland Roar but was rejected for failing to impress in trial matches and also due to his lack of fitness.

== Honours ==
With Boca Júnior:

- Campeonato Sergipano 2nd Division: 2004

Personal Honours:

- Campeonato Sergipano 2nd Division Top Scorer: 2004 with Boca Júnior - 5 goals
- Campeonato Sergipano Top Scorer: 2005 with Boca Júnior - 15 goals
