= Fernando Crosa =

Argentine football defender

Personal information
- Full name: Fernando Javier Crosa
- Date of birth: February 28, 1979 (age 47)
- Place of birth: Rosario, Argentina
- Height: 1.85 m (6 ft 1 in)
- Position: Defender

Youth career
- Newell's Old Boys

Senior career*
Years	Team	Apps	(Gls)
1997–2002	Newell's Old Boys	165	(12)
2003–2005	River Plate	19	(1)
2005–2006	Colón de Santa Fe	18	(1)
2006–2007	Quilmes	11	(1)
2007–2008	Gimnasia (LP)	0	(0)
2008	Talleres de Córdoba	0	(0)
2008– 2010	Chacarita Juniors	11	(1)

International career
1999	Argentina U-20		
2000	Argentina U-23		
- * Club domestic league appearances and goals as of 23:57, 23 May 2010

Fernando Javier Crosa (born 28 February 1979 in Rosario) is an Argentinian footballer who plays as a defender. He was part of the Argentina U-20 team that won the South American Youth Championship in 1999.

== Playing career ==
=== Club ===
Crosa began his playing career with Newell's Old Boys in 1997, he made his league debut on 23 November in a 0–4 defeat in the Rosario derby. He went on to make 165 league appearances for Newell's, scoring 12 goals.

In 2003 Crosa joined River Plate where he was part of the squad that won the Clausra 2004 championship.

In 2005, he joined Colón de Santa Fe, he then had stints with Quilmes, Gimnasia (LP) and Talleres de Córdoba before joining Chacarita Juniors in July 2008.

=== International ===
Crosa played for the Argentina U-20 team in 1999, when they won the South American Youth Championship and played in the 1999 FIFA World Youth Championship. He also played for Argentina U-23 in 2000.

== Titles ==
Argentina U-20

- 1999 South American Youth Championship:

River Plate

- Primera División Argentina: Clausra 2004
