= Patricio Neira =

Chilean footballer

Personal information
- Full name: Patricio Enrique Neira Muñoz
- Date of birth: 18 April 1979 (age 47)
- Place of birth: Santiago, Chile
- Height: 1.69 m (5 ft 7 in)
- Position: Forward

Youth career
- Palestino

Senior career*
Years	Team	Apps	(Gls)
1996–1998	Palestino	46	(14)
1999	Huachipato	25	(3)
1999–2000	Puebla		
2000	Palestino	16	(2)
2001–2002	Deportes Arica		(22)
2003	Deportes Concepción		(6)
2004	Universidad de Concepción	8	(1)
2004	Santiago Morning		
2005	Deportes Puerto Montt	27	(8)
2006	Rangers	29	(5)
2007	Deportivo Temuco	38	(9)
2008	Deportes Copiapó	19	(5)

International career
1998–1999	Chile U20	9	(4)
1999	Chile	2	(0)
- * Club domestic league appearances and goals

Patricio Enrique Neira Muñoz (born 18 April 1979) is a Chilean former footballer who played as a forward for clubs in Chile and Mexico.

== Club career ==
A product of the Palestino youth system, Neira played for them and Huachipato before joining Mexican side Puebla in 1999.

He returned to Palestino in Chile in the second half of 2000. He played for Universidad de Concepción, Deportes Puerto Montt and Rangers de Talca in the Chilean top division.

In the Chilean second level, he played for Deportes Arica, Deportes Concepción, Santiago Morning, Deportivo Temuco and Deportes Copiapó, his last club.

== International career ==
Neira represented Chile at the under-20 level in the 1999 South American Championship, becoming the team's top goalscorer with four goals. Previously, he had won the 1998 L'Alcúdia International Tournament.

In February of the same year, he made two appearances for the Chile senior team in friendlies against Guatemala and the United States.

== Personal life ==
Neira works as a football agent.

In December 2022, he suffered a CVA.

== Honours ==
Chile U20

- L'Alcúdia International Tournament: 1998
