= Emerson Acuña =

Colombian footballer (born 1979)

Emerson de Jesús Acuña Fluviano
Personal information
- Date of birth: June 16, 1979 (age 47)
- Place of birth: Barranquilla, Colombia
- Position: Striker

Senior career*
| Years | Team | Apps | (Gls) |
| 2000–2010 | Atlético Junior | 261 | (24) |
| 2010 | Once Caldas | 16 | (1) |
| 2011 | Uniautónoma | 29 | (1) |
| 2012 | Deportivo Anzoátegui | 11 | (1) |
| 2012 | José Gálvez | | |
- * Club domestic league appearances and goals

Emerson de Jesús Acuña Fluviano who usually is known as Emerson Acuña (born June 16, 1979) is a retired Colombian football striker.
