= Estadio General San Martín =

Defunct football stadium in Mar del Plata, Argentina

General San Martín Stadium
- Estadio General San Martín
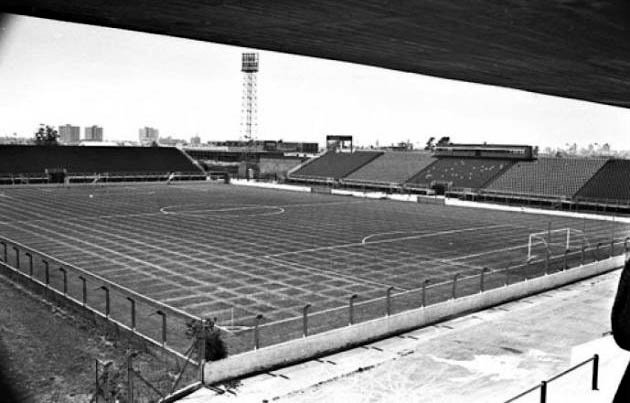
- View of the stadium in 1974
- Interactive map of General San Martín Stadium
- Address: Avenida Champagnat and Alvarado; Mar del Plata; Argentina
- Coordinates: 37.99094174°S 57.59254603°W
- Owner: Liga Marplatense de Fútbol
- Capacity: 22,000
- Surface: Grass
- Field size: 105 x 70 m

Construction
- Opened: 4 May 1952
- Renovated: 1969
- Closed: 1996; 30 years ago
- Demolished: 1996

Tenants
- Liga Marplatense de Fútbol (1952–); Torneos de Verano (1968–78); Argentina national football team (1968–77)

The Estadio General San Martín was a stadium located in the city of Mar del Plata, Argentina. Owned by Liga Marplatense de Fútbol (the local football league), it was inaugurated in 1952 being the main venue in the city. Most of the most important matches of Mar del Plata football league were hosted there, as well as some friendly matches of the Argentina national football team. Brazilian team Santos FC (with his superstar Pelé) played four matches at the stadium.

When Estadio José María Minella was inaugurated for the 1978 FIFA World Cup it consolidated as the main venue in Mar del Plata while General San Martín was losing importance. The stadium finally closed its doors and was demolished in 1996. A supermarket chain was built on the land previously occupied by Estadio San Martín.

== History ==
Inaugurated on May 4, 1952 with a tournament between local teams plus Independiente, the stadium was built with mostly wooden grandstands. Later, all the wood structures would be replaced by concrete stands.

During its existence, the stadium hosted the most important matches of the local League, the first editions of Torneos de Verano (summer tournaments organized in the city since 1968). The stadium was also host for the home matches by local clubs Aldosivi, Alvarado, San Lorenzo, Kimberley, and Círculo Deportivo de Otamendi in the old National Championships and their qualifying tournaments.

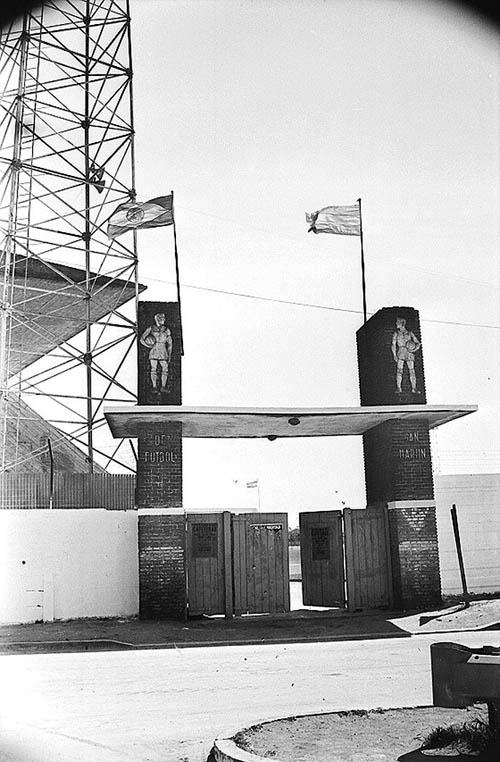
Main entrance to the stadium. The two columns with the statues engraved were preserved after the venue was demolished

In its four decades of life, General San Martín received the most important Argentine and foreign clubs and even the Argentina national team. The stadium hosted the first Italian team to visit Mar del Plata, Cagliari, which beat 3–1 a local combined in 1966. One year later, Brazilian team Santos with superstar Pelé played at General San Martín a friendly match vs a local combined, won by Santos 4–0. Four days later Santos beat River Plate by the same score. The match had a record attendance. The third match played by Pelé was the Intercontinental Champions' Supercup, a competition contested by the past winners of the Intercontinental Cup, vs Argentine side Racing, which won 2–1.

In 1970 Santos and Pelé returned to Mar del Plata to play a friendly vs Boca Juniors. The match, ended 2–2, set a new record with $14,143,000 in tickets sold. Former F1 world champion Juan Manuel Fangio awarded Pelé a plaque in recognition for his 1,000 goals scored. That same year, local club Kimberley thrashed Independiente 5–0 in the 1970 Campeonato Nacional.

A plaque located in the old entrance recalls that Diego Armando Maradona scored his first two official goals there, in a match between his team at the time, Argentinos Juniors, and San Lorenzo de Mar del Plata, on 14 November 1976. The Argentina national football team also played some friendly matches at General San Martín Stadium between 1968 and 1977.

After the inauguration of José María Minella Stadium, General San Martín was losing importance, until its owner decided to sell it, being finally demolished in June 1996. A hypermarket and a freight company are currently located on the stadium grounds. The old entrance remains standing, with the traditional statues of two players, and a commemorative plaque.

== Notable matches ==
Note: in the case of the Argentina national team, matches vs club teams are not included.

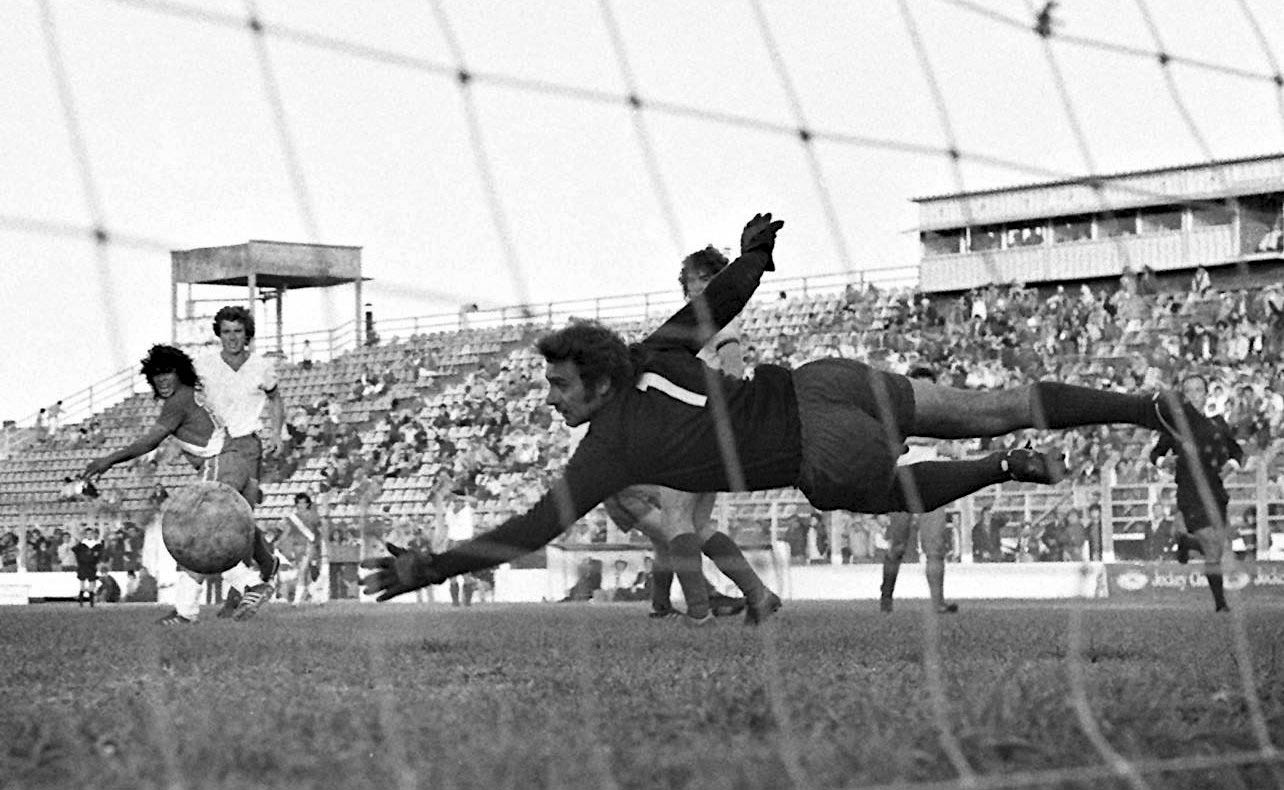
Maradona scoring his first official goal at General San Martín, November 1976

Date	Team 1	Score	Team 2	Competition
4 Jul 1966	(Argentina) Mar del Plata	1–3	(Italy) Cagliari	Friendly
15 Jan 1967	(Argentina) Mar del Plata	0–4	(Brazil) Santos	Friendly
19 Jan 1967	(Argentina) River Plate	0–4	(Brazil) Santos	Friendly
17 Dec 1968	Argentina	1–0	Poland	Friendly
22 Dec 1968	Argentina	1–1	Yugoslavia	Friendly
29 Nov 1969	(Argentina) Racing	2–1	(Brazil) Santos	Intercontinental Supercup
16 Jan 1970	(Argentina) Boca Juniors	2–2	(Brazil) Santos	Friendly
1 Nov 1970	(Argentina) Kimberley	5–0	(Argentina) Independiente	1970 Nacional
13 Jan 1971	Argentina	2–0	France	Friendly
14 Nov 1976	(Argentina) San Lorenzo (Mdp)	2–5	(Argentina) Argentinos Juniors	1976 Nacional (Note: In that match, Diego Maradona scored his two first official goals.)
