= Nicolás Córdova =

Chilean footballer and manager (born 1979)

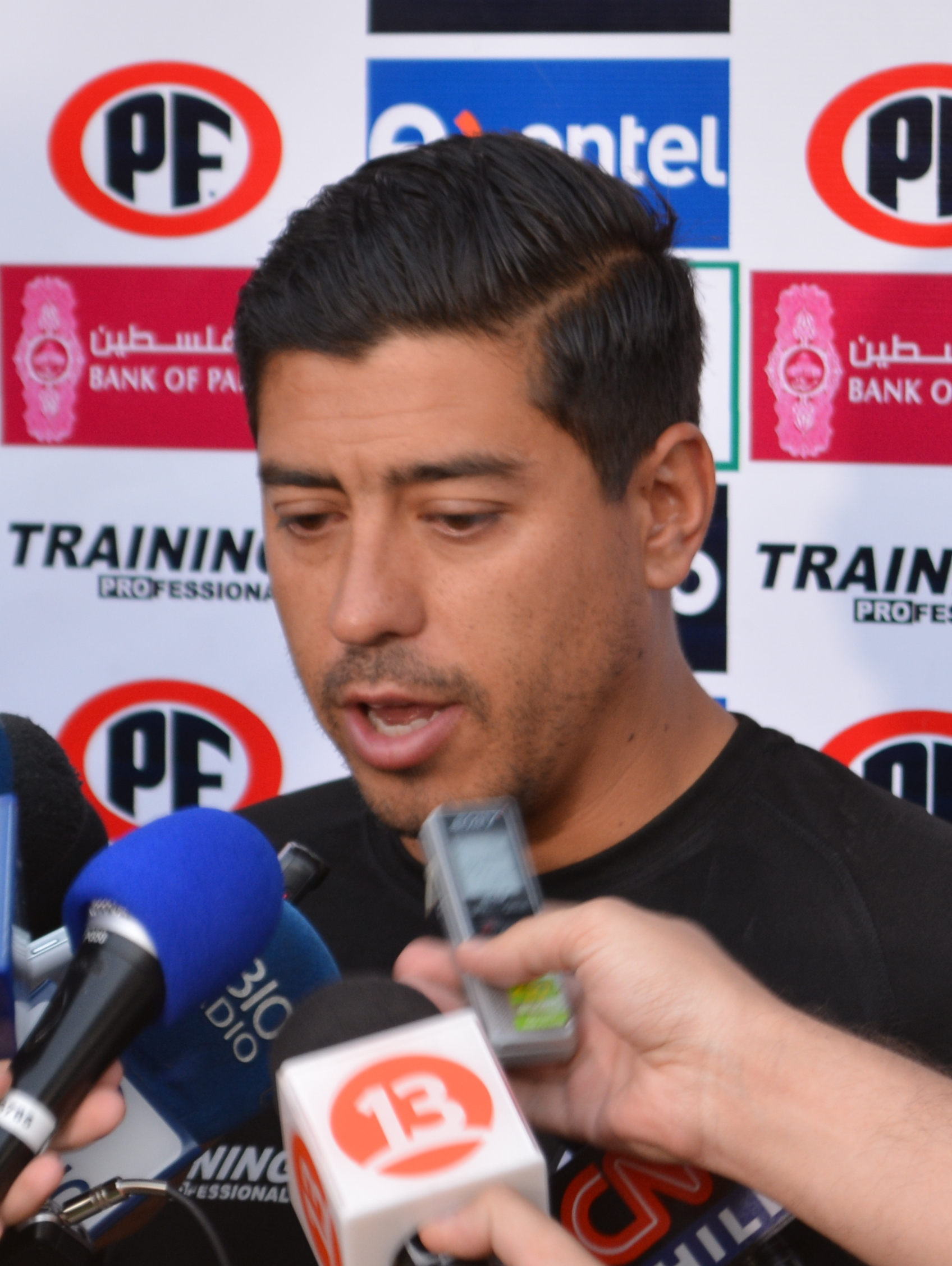
- Córdova as manager of Palestino in 2016

Personal information
- Full name: Nicolas Andrés Córdova San Cristóbal
- Date of birth: 9 February 1979 (age 47)
- Place of birth: Talca, Chile
- Height: 1.74 m (5 ft 9 in)
- Position: Midfielder

Team information
- Current team: Chile (interim head coach); Chile U20 (head coach)

Youth career
- Colo-Colo

Senior career*
Years	Team	Apps	(Gls)
1997–2000	Colo-Colo	54	(3)
2001	Unión Española	14	(1)
2001	Perugia	12	(1)
2002	Crotone	15	(1)
2002–2004	Bari	65	(17)
2004	Livorno	5	(0)
2005–2006	Ascoli	12	(0)
2006–2008	Messina	59	(12)
2008–2009	Grosseto	32	(7)
2009	Parma	0	(0)
2010–2012	Brescia	61	(6)

International career
1998–1999	Chile U20		
2003–2011	Chile	5	(1)

Managerial career
- 2014–2015: Chile U20 (assistant)
- 2015: Chile U15
- 2015: Chile U20
- 2016–2017: Palestino
- 2017–2018: Santiago Wanderers
- 2018–2019: Universitario
- 2020–2022: Qatar U23
- 2022: Al-Rayyan (interim)
- 2022–2023: Al-Rayyan
- 2023–: Chile U20
- 2023: Chile (caretaker)
- 2024: Chile U23 (interim)
- 2025–: Chile (interim)
- * Club domestic league appearances and goals

Nicolas Andrés Córdova San Cristóbal (Spanish pronunciation: [nikoˈlas ˈkoɾðoβa], born 9 February 1979) is a Chilean football manager and former footballer. He is the head coach of the Chile under-20 national team and currently acts as interim head coach of the Chile senior national team.

== Playing career ==
Córdova began his career in Colo-Colo of Chile in the top flight. He played from 1997 until 2001 playing 54 matches and scoring three goals.

In the 2004–05 season, he played Livorno. In September 2008, he was signed for Grosseto.

At international level, he represented Chile U20 in the 1999 South American Championship, and to the Chile senior team five times. He also won the L'Alcúdia Tournament in 1998, alongside players such as Claudio Maldonado and Luis Mena.

=== International goals ===
No.	Date	Venue	Opponent	Score	Result	Competition
1.	10 August 2011	Stade de la Mosson, Montpellier, France	France	1–1	1–1	International friendly

== Coaching career ==
Córdova began his professional managerial career with the Chile U20 in 2015, winning the L'Alcúdia Tournament.

On 13 February 2022, he was appointed interim coach of Al-Rayyan in Qatar. In June 2022, he was confirmed as the manager of Al-Rayyan.

=== Statistics ===
As of 17 November 2026

Managerial record by team and tenure
Team	Nat	From	To	Record				
Team	Nat	From	To	P	W	D	L	Win %
Palestino	(Chile)	1 January 2016	12 March 2017	49	19	13	17	38.78
Santiago Wanderers	(Chile)	1 July 2017	19 March 2018	36	9	15	12	25.00
Universitario	(Peru)	15 June 2018	27 May 2019	37	16	7	14	43.24
Al-Rayyan	(Qatar)	13 February 2022	22 May 2023	43	13	10	20	30.23
Chile (interim)	(Chile)	17 November 2023	22 November 2023	1	0	0	1	0.00
Chile Olympic (interim)	(Chile)	11 December 2023	4 February 2024	5	3	0	2	60.00
Chile U-20	(Chile)	21 August 2023	present	24	10	1	13	41.67
Chile (interim)	(Chile)	4 July 2025	present	14	5	2	7	35.71
Total				208	75	48	85	36.06

== Honours ==
=== Player ===
Colo-Colo

- Primera División de Chile (2): 1997 Clausura, 1998

Chile U20

- L'Alcúdia International Tournament (1): 1998

=== Manager ===
Chile U20

- L'Alcúdia International Tournament (1): 2015

Santiago Wanderers

- Copa Chile (1): 2017
