= Ernesto Arakaki =

Peruvian football defender (born 1979)

Personal information
- Full name: Ernesto Seiko Arakaki Arakaki
- Date of birth: June 13, 1979 (age 47)
- Place of birth: Lima, Peru
- Height: 1.81 m (5 ft 11 in)
- Position: Defender

Youth career
- 1991–1997: Deportivo AELU

Senior career*
Years	Team	Apps	(Gls)
1997	Deportivo AELU		
1998–1999	Deportivo Municipal	50	(0)
2000–2008	Alianza Lima	235	(21)
2009	Cienciano	36	(2)

International career^{‡}
1995	Peru U-17	3	(0)
1998–1999	Peru U-20	12	(0)
1999–2000	Peru U-23	0	(0)
2001–2007	Peru	3	(0)
- * Club domestic league appearances and goals as of 00:16, 2 October 2007 (UTC) ‡ National team caps and goals as of 18:52, 23 April 2008 (UTC)

Ernesto Seikō Arakaki Arakaki (born June 13, 1979, in Lima) is a Peruvian retired football defender.

== Club career ==
He had played for the Second Division team Deportivo AELU since he was twelve years old. In 1998, he was bought by the First Division team Municipal and played for them for two years. Alianza Lima bought him in 2000, where he scored his first goal. He has won four league-titles with Alianza and has been present in several international competitions. In 2008, he moved to Andean club Cienciano from the city of Cuzco.

He retired in 2010 due to a chronic knee injury that aggravated when he had a tried out in Asia. Now he is the coach of the divisiones inferiores of Alianza Lima.
