= Mario Gómez (footballer, born May 1981) =

Peruvian footballer

Personal information
- Full name: Mario Augusto Gómez Urbina
- Date of birth: 27 May 1981 (age 45)
- Place of birth: Callao, Peru
- Height: 1.76 m (5 ft 9 in)
- Position: Centre midfielder

Team information
- Current team: Los Caimanes
- Number: 15

Senior career*
Years	Team	Apps	(Gls)
1998–2005	Universitario	113	(3)
2005	→ Sport Áncash (loan)	15	(1)
2006	Universidad San Martín	3	(0)
2006–2007	Sport Boys	47	(0)
2008–2009	Juan Aurich	18	(4)
2008	→ Cienciano (loan)	24	(1)
2010–	Sport Boys	44	(0)
2013–	Los Caimanes		

International career^{‡}
1999–2007	Peru	3	(0)
- * Club domestic league appearances and goals ‡ National team caps and goals as of February 17, 2009

Mario Augusto Gomez Urbina (born 27 May 1981 in Callao) is a footballer from Peru who plays for Sport Boys.

In April 2010 he was arrested by police after being accused of shooting a 17-year-old man. After 73 days in prison he was released on July 7 of that same year returning to the Sport Boys.

== International career ==
He is also a former member of Peru national football team.
