= Jaime Barrientos =

Chilean footballer and manager (born 1980)

Personal information
- Full name: Jaime Andrés Barrientos Rivera
- Date of birth: 20 May 1980 (age 46)
- Place of birth: Santiago, Chile
- Height: 1.78 m (5 ft 10 in)
- Position: Midfielder

Senior career*
Years	Team	Apps	(Gls)
1999–2009	Provincial Osorno	189	(7)
2000–2001	→ Temuco (loan)	30	(0)
2006	→ S. Morning (loan)	21	(0)
2010	Concepción	29	(0)
2011–2014	Naval	107	(2)
2014–2015	Lota Schwager	34	(0)

Managerial career
- 2018–2019: Provincial Ranco
- * Club domestic league appearances and goals as of 29 March 2020

Jaime Andrés Barrientos Rivera (born 20 May 1980) is a Chilean former footballer and current manager.

== Honours ==
=== Player ===
Provincial Osorno

- Primera B (1): 2007
