= Eriberto =

Eriberto is a given name. Notable people with the name include:

- Eriberto Leão (born 1972), Brazilian actor
- Eriberto Loreto (1931–2005), Filipino lawyer and politician
- José Eriberto Medeiros (born 1965), Brazilian politician
- Eriberto Arroyo Mío (1943–1989), Peruvian politician
- Eriberto Conceicao da Silva (born 1975), Brazilian footballer known as Luciano
