= Gerzon Chacón =

Venezuelan footballer (born 1980)

Personal information
- Full name: Gerzon Armando Chacón Varela
- Date of birth: November 25, 1980 (age 45)
- Place of birth: San Cristóbal, Venezuela
- Height: 1.76 m (5 ft 9 in)
- Position: Defender

Team information
- Current team: Deportivo Tachira

Senior career*
Years	Team	Apps	(Gls)
1997–2000	Deportivo Táchira		
2000–2001	ItalChacao		
2001–2002	Nacional Táchira		
2002–2003	Deportivo Táchira		
2004	Mineros		
2004–2005	Deportivo Táchira		
2005	ItalChacao		
2006–2012	Deportivo Táchira		
2012	Sportivo Luqueño		
2012–2013	Aragua		
2014–	Deportivo Tachira		

International career
1999–2009	Venezuela	21	(0)
- * Club domestic league appearances and goals as of May 2009

Gerzon Armando Chacón (born 25 November 1980 in San Cristóbal) is a Venezuelan football defender who made a total number of 17 appearances (no goals) for the Venezuela national team since 1999. He started his professional career at Deportivo Táchira.
