= Jimmy Asprilla =

Colombian footballer (born 1980)

Personal information
- Full name: Jimmy Adolfo Asprilla Mosquera
- Date of birth: June 1, 1980 (age 46)
- Place of birth: Zarzal, Colombia
- Height: 1.83 m (6 ft 0 in)
- Position: Defender

Senior career*
Years	Team	Apps	(Gls)
1999	Atlético Huila		
1999	Once Caldas		
2000	Deportivo Cali		
2001	Sport Boys		
2001–2002	Estudiantes de Mérida		
2002–2005	Deportivo Cali		
2005–2007	Once Caldas		
2007	Atlético Bucaramanga		
2008	Once Caldas		
2008	Millonarios		
2009–2010	Deportivo Pasto	5	(0)
2011	América de Cali	12	(0)
2011–2012	Cúcuta Deportivo	16	(0)
- * Club domestic league appearances and goals as of April 21, 2013

Jimmy Adolfo Asprilla Mosquera (born June 1, 1980) is a Colombian footballer who plays as a defender. He was born in the city of Zarzal in the Valle Department of Colombia.
