= Luis Cordero (Peruvian footballer) =

Peruvian footballer and manager (born 1981)

Personal information
- Full name: Luis Enrique Cordero Cuéllar
- Date of birth: 8 April 1981 (age 45)
- Place of birth: Lima, Peru
- Height: 1.77 m (5 ft 10 in)
- Position: Midfielder

Youth career
- Universitario

Senior career*
Years	Team	Apps	(Gls)
1998–2001	Universitario		
2002	Alianza Atlético		
2002	FBC Melgar		
2003	Unión Huaral		
2004	Universitario		
2005–2006	Unión Huaral		
2007–2010	U. César Vallejo		
2011	José Gálvez FBC		
2012	UTC		
2013–2014	Carlos A. Mannucci		
2015	Alianza Universidad		
2016	Carlos A. Mannucci		

International career
1999	Peru U20	9	(2)
2000	Peru Olympic	3	(0)

Managerial career
- 2016: Unión Cruz Blanca (Otuzco)
- 2017: Alfonso Ugarte (Chiclín)
- 2018–2019: Deportivo El Inca
- 2019: Juventud Talentos (women)
- 2020–2021: Racing Club (Huamachuco)
- 2021–2025: Carlos A. Mannucci (women)
- 2025: Carlos A. Mannucci
- * Club domestic league appearances and goals

Luis Enrique Cordero Cuéllar (born 8 April 1981) is a Peruvian football manager and former player.

== Playing career ==
Nicknamed Pompo, Luis Cordero was developed at Universitario de Deportes. He began his career there in 1998, given his debut by coach Oswaldo Piazza at the age of 17. With Universitario, he won three consecutive Peruvian championships in 1998, 1999 and 2000 and participated in two Copa Libertadores tournaments in 2000 and 2001 (two matches in total, no goals).

After stints with Alianza Atlético, FBC Melgar and Unión Huaral between 2002 and 2003, he returned to Universitario in 2004.

In 2007, he signed with Universidad César Vallejo and won the second division championship that same year. In 2011, he won again the second division championship with José Gálvez FBC. In 2012, he won the Copa Perú with Universidad Técnica de Cajamarca. He ended his career in 2016 with Carlos A. Mannucci of Trujillo.

Although he never played for the senior national team, Luis Cordero played with the U20 team in the CONMEBOL U20 Championship in 1999. The following year, he played for the Peruvian Olympic team in the 2000 CONMEBOL Pre-Olympic Tournament.

== Managerial career ==
Luis Cordero has managed several Copa Perú (Peruvian fourth division) clubs since 2016, including Alfonso Ugarte de Chiclín in 2017.

However, it is as a women's football coach that he has achieved his best results, notably leading the Carlos A. Mannucci women's team to two consecutive Peruvian championship podium finishes in 2022 (runner-up) and 2023 (third place). He will also be in charge of the club's men's team in 2025.

== Honours ==
=== Player ===
Universitario de Deportes

- Torneo Descentralizado (3): 1998, 1999, 2000

Universidad César Vallejo

- Peruvian Segunda División: 2007

José Gálvez FBC

- Peruvian Segunda División: 2011
- Torneo del Inca: 2011

Universidad Técnica de Cajamarca

- Copa Perú: 2012
