= 2011 African U-23 Championship qualification =

2012 Summer Olympics – Men's Football African Qualifiers
- Dates: 8 October 2010 – 19 June 2011

Tournament statistics
- Top scorer(s): (Nigeria) Ekigho Ehiosun (5 goals)

This page provides the summaries of the matches of the first two qualifying rounds for the group stage of the 2012 CAF Men's Pre-Olympic Tournament. These matches also serve as part of the qualifiers for the Football at the 2012 Summer Olympics to be held in London.

== Seeding ==
In total, 39 teams opted to enter the qualifying tournament. The top 25 teams based on the qualifiers and final round of the previous Olympics were given byes to the first qualifying round.

Seeded	Unseeded
Algeria; Angola; Benin; Burkina Faso; Cameroon; Congo; Ivory Coast; Egypt; Gabon; Gambia; Ghana; Guinea; Libya; Mali; Morocco; Mozambique; Nigeria; Malawi; Rwanda; Senegal; South Africa; Tanzania; Tunisia; Uganda; Zambia	Botswana; Chad; DR Congo; Djibouti; Equatorial Guinea; Ethiopia; Liberia; Madagascar; Mauritius; Namibia; Sierra Leone; Somalia; Sudan; Swaziland

== Preliminary qualifying round ==
Team 1	Agg.	Team 2	1st leg	2nd leg
Sierra Leone	2–2 (1–3 p)	Liberia	1–1	1–1
Somalia	0–1	Sudan	0–0	0–1
Botswana	1–0	Namibia	1–0	0–0
DR Congo	w/o	Chad	—	—
Ethiopia	w/o	Equatorial Guinea	—	—
Swaziland	w/o	Mauritius	—	—
Djibouti	w/o	Madagascar	—	—

8 October 2010

Sierra Leone	1–1	Liberia
Kamara 35'		Johnson 56'

19 December 2010

Liberia	1–1	Sierra Leone
Oliseh 50'
Penalties
	3–1

Sierra Leone 2–2 Liberia on aggregate. Liberia won 3–1 on penalties

10 October 2010

Somalia	0–0	Sudan

18 December 2010

Sudan	1–0	Somalia
Nizar Hamid 20'

Sudan won 1–0 on aggregate

9 October 2010

Botswana	1–0	Namibia
Nato 20'

18 December 2010

Namibia	0–0	Botswana

Botswana won 1–0 on aggregate

== First qualifying round ==
The matches in the preliminary round were held on 25–27 March 2011 (first leg) and 8–10 April 2011 (second leg).

Team 1	Agg.	Team 2	1st leg	2nd leg
Zambia	3–0	Rwanda	2–0	1–0
Morocco	3–2	Mozambique	2–0	1–2
Cameroon	3–3 (3–4 p)	Tanzania	2–1	1–2
Senegal	1–1 (a)	Angola	0–0	1–1
South Africa	4–2	Libya	4–2	0–0
Algeria	4–0	Madagascar	3–0	1–0
Egypt	3–2	Botswana	2–0	1–2
Gabon	4–1	Swaziland	3–1	1–0
Burkina Faso	2–5	DR Congo	1–2	1–3
Ivory Coast	4–0	Liberia	4–0	0–0
Tunisia	3–0	Malawi	2–0	1–0
Benin	w/o	Gambia	—	—
Uganda	1–1 (2–4 p)	Congo	1–0	0–1
Mali	2–2 (a)	Guinea	0–0	2–2
Nigeria	9–1	Equatorial Guinea	5–0	4–1
Ghana	1–2	Sudan	0–1	1–1

26 March 2011
14:00 UTC+2

Zambia	2–0	Rwanda
Kabwe 24'; Kola 34'

3 April 2011
14:30 UTC+2

Rwanda	0–1	Zambia
		Nyainde 54'

Zambia won 3–0 on aggregate

26 March 2011
20:00 UTC±0

Morocco	2–0	Mozambique
Hamdallah 83'; Labyad 89'

Marrakesh Stadium, Marrakesh
10 April 2011
15:00 UTC+2

Mozambique	2–1	Morocco
Cumbe 25'; Uetimane 90+1'		Mokhtar 69'

Maputo

Morocco won 3–2 on aggregate

27 March 2011
14:30 UTC+2

Cameroon	2–1	Tanzania
Pangwoh 10', 47'		Ulimwengu 40'

9 April 2011

Tanzania	2–1	Cameroon
Makasi 11'; Ulimwengu 64'	Report	Etoundi 10'
Penalties
	4–3

Dar es Salaam

Tanzania 3–3 Cameroon. Tanzania won 4–3 on penalties

26 March 2011

Senegal	0–0	Angola

9 April 2011

Angola	1–1 (a.e.t.)	Senegal
Belchior 114'		A. Fall 110'

Estádio de Ombaka, Benguela

Angola 1–1 Senegal. Senegal won on away goals rule

27 March 2011
14:00 UTC+2

South Africa	4–2	Libya
Ndulula 22'; Zwane 43'; Bhengu 56'; Masango 68'	Report	Mphahlele 72' (o.g.); Al-Ghulla 90+4'

Sinaba Stadium, Johannesburg
9 April 2011
20:00 UTC±0

Libya	0–0	South Africa

Stade 26 mars, Bamako, (Mali)

South Africa won 4–2 on aggregate

26 March 2011
15:00 UTC+1

Algeria	3–0	Madagascar
Chalali 45+1', 78'; Mesfar 86'

Stade Dar El Beïda, Algiers
10 April 2011

Madagascar	0–1	Algeria
		Aouedj 1'

Mahamasina Municipal Stadium, Antananarivo

Algeria won 4–0 on aggregate

25 March 2011

Egypt	2–0	Botswana
Mohamed 31'; Mohsen 77'	Report

Petro Sport Stadium, Cairo
8 April 2011

Botswana	2–1	Egypt
Moeng 41', 61'	Report	Mohsen 80'

Gaborone

Egypt won 3–2 on aggregate

26 March 2011

Gabon	3–1	Swaziland
Madinda 15'; Bamba 52', 89'		Mdluli 46'

10 April 2011

Swaziland	0–1	Gabon
		Tandjigora 1'

Lobamba

Gabon won 4–1 on aggregate

27 March 2011

Burkina Faso	1–2	DR Congo
Plange 47'		Mutombo 66'; Botayi 86'

Stade du 4-Août, Ouagadougou
9 April 2011

DR Congo	3–1	Burkina Faso
Botayi 45', 75'; Diego Mutombo 78' (pen.)		Ouedraogo 62'

Kinshasa

Congo DR won 5–2 on aggregate

27 March 2011

Ivory Coast	4–0	Liberia
Déblé 13', 63'; Meïté 28'; Traoré 90'	Report

Accra
20 April 2011

Liberia	0–0	Ivory Coast

Monrovia

Côte d'Ivoire won 4–0 on aggregate

26 March 2011

Tunisia	2–0	Malawi
Msakni 4'; Maâloul 61'

9 April 2011

Malawi	0–1	Tunisia
	Report	Mhirsi 77'

Blantyre

Tunisia won 3–0 on aggregate

Benin	w/o	Gambia

Benin advance after The Gambia withdrew

26 March 2011

Uganda	1–0	Congo
Ndugwa 90'

10 April 2011

Congo	1–0	Uganda
Boukama-Kaya 53'
Penalties
	4–2

Brazzaville

Congo 1–1 Uganda. Congo won 4–2 on penalties

26 March 2011

Mali	0–0	Guinea

10 April 2011

Guinea	2–2	Mali
Soumah 7' (pen.); Barry 84'		Traore 3'; Kone 82'

Conakry

Guinea 2–2 Mali. Mali won on away goals rule

26 March 2011

Nigeria	5–0	Equatorial Guinea
Igiebor 44', 65'; Ighalo 18'; Lukman 26'; Ehiosun 90+1'	Report

Samuel Ogbemudia Stadium, Benin City
10 April 2011

Equatorial Guinea	1–4	Nigeria
Abaga 72'	Report	Ehiosun 13', 64', 78'; Uchechi 45'

Malabo

Nigeria won 9–1 on aggregate

26 March 2011

Ghana	0–1	Sudan
	Report	Martin 90'

Ohene Djan Stadium, Accra
9 April 2011

Sudan	1–1	Ghana
Alagab 9'	Report	Adams 75'

Khartoum Stadium, Khartoum

Sudan won 2–1 on aggregate

== Second qualifying round ==
The draw for the second qualifying round was held on April 13, 2011. CAF used FIFA rankings from March 2011 to seed the eight highest-ranked teams into Pot A.

Côte d'Ivoire's fixture against Liberia had been delayed until 20 April due to the civil unrest. As Ivory Coast are the 2nd highest-ranking team in Africa, the winner of their first qualifying round fixture was also placed in Pot A.

=== Seeding ===
The pots were confirmed as follows:

Pot A		Pot B	
Algeria; Ivory Coast; Egypt; Gabon	Morocco; Nigeria; South Africa; Tunisia	Benin; Congo; DR Congo; Mali	Senegal; Sudan; Tanzania; Zambia

=== Matches ===
The draw was conducted on April 13 in Cairo, Egypt.

Team 1	Agg.	Team 2	1st leg	2nd leg
Algeria	3–2	Zambia	3–0	0–2
Morocco	3–2	DR Congo	2–1	1–1
Congo	1–3	Ivory Coast	1–2	0–1
Gabon	1–0	Mali	0–0	1–0
Sudan	0–2	Egypt	0–0	0–2
Benin	4–6	South Africa	3–1	1–5
Tunisia	0–1	Senegal	0–0	0–1
Tanzania	1–3	Nigeria	1–0	0–3

3 June 2011
20:00

Algeria	3–0	Zambia
Aouedj 27', 66'; Benlamri 45'

20 August 1955 Stadium, Algiers
18 June 2011
15:00

Zambia	2–0	Algeria
Mapande 13'; Mwansa 75'	Report

Nchanga Stadium, Chingola

Algeria won 3–2 on aggregate

3 June 2011
21:00

Morocco	2–1	DR Congo
Qasmi 8'; Hamdallah 90+2'		Kanda 68'

Stade Mohamed V, Casablanca
18 June 2011
16:30

DR Congo	1–1	Morocco
Kanda 58'	Report	Hamdallah 87'

Morocco won 3–2 on aggregate

5 June 2011

Congo	1–2	Ivory Coast

18 June 2011
18:00

Ivory Coast	1–0	Congo
Gougouhi 10'	Report

Côte d'Ivoire won 3–1 on aggregate

4 June 2011

Gabon	0–0	Mali

19 June 2011
17:00

Mali	0–1 (a.e.t.)	Gabon
	Report	Ndong 112'

Stade Modibo Kéïta, Bamako

Gabon won 1–0 on aggregate

4 June 2011
18:30

Sudan	0–0	Egypt

Khartoum Stadium, Khartoum
18 June 2011
20:30

Egypt	2–0	Sudan
Shroyda 58'; Ahmed 68'	Report

Harras El-Hedoud Stadium, Alexandria

Egypt won 2–0 on aggregate

4 June 2011
14:00

Benin	3–1	South Africa
Suanon 40', 42'; Dassagaté 50'		Ndulula 31'

Stade René Pleven d'Akpakpa, Cotonou
19 June 2011
14:00

South Africa	5–1	Benin
Bhengu 16'; Sangweni 25'; Masango 38'; Ndulula 48', 87'		Suanon 79'

Rand Stadium, Johannesburg

South Africa 6–4 on aggregate

4 June 2011
16:00

Tunisia	0–0	Senegal

Stade El Menzah, Tunis
18 June 2011
20:00

Senegal	1–0	Tunisia
A. Sané 50'

Senegal won 1–0 on aggregate

5 June 2011
15:00

Tanzania	1–0	Nigeria
Ulimwengu 82'

Benjamin Mkapa National Stadium, Dar-es-Salaam
Referee: Sylvester Kirwa (Kenya)
19 June 2011
17:00

Nigeria	3–0	Tanzania
Ehiosun 3'; Oseni 56'; Musa 90'

Samuel Ogbemudia Stadium, Benin City
Referee: Ousmane Fall (Senegal)

Nigeria 3–1 on aggregate

== Goalscorers ==
There were 99 goals scored in 52 matches, for an average of 1.9 goals per match.

5 goals

- (Nigeria) Ekigho Ehiosun

4 goals

- (South Africa) Bongani Ndulula

3 goals

- (Algeria) Sid Ahmed Aouedj
- (Benin) Abdel Fadel Suanon
- (Democratic Republic of the Congo) Bamato Botayi
- (Morocco) Abderrazak Hamdallah
- (Tanzania) Thomas Ulimwengu

2 goals

- (Algeria) Mohamed Chalali
- (Botswana) Bakang Moeng
- (Cameroon) Mark Pangwoh
- (Democratic Republic of the Congo) Déo Kanda
- (Democratic Republic of the Congo) Diego Mutombo
- (Egypt) Marwan Mohsen
- (Gabon) Ralph Bamba
- (Ivory Coast) Serges Déblé
- (Nigeria) Nosa Igiebor
- (South Africa) Phumelele Bhengu
- (South Africa) Mandla Masango

1 goal

- (Algeria) Djamel Benlamri
- (Algeria) Oussama Mesfar
- (Angola) Belchior
- (Benin) William Dassagaté
- (Botswana) Ofentse Nato
- (Burkina Faso) Ismaël Ouedraogo
- (Burkina Faso) Nii Plange
- (Cameroon) Franck Etoundi
- (Republic of the Congo) Julsy Boukama-Kaya
- (Egypt) Shehab El-Din Ahmed
- (Egypt) Hesham Mohamed
- (Egypt) Ahmed Shroyda
- (Equatorial Guinea) Kelvin Abaga
- (Gabon) Lévy Madinda
- (Gabon) Henri Junior Ndong
- (Gabon) Merlin Tandjigora
- (Ghana) Sadick Adams
- (Guinea) Hady Barry
- (Guinea) Aly Badara Soumah
- (Ivory Coast) Jean-Jacques Gougouhi
- (Ivory Coast) Yacouba Meïté
- (Ivory Coast) Lacina Traoré
- (Liberia) Sam Johnson
- (Liberia) Sekou Oliseh
- (Libya) Sami Al-Ghulla
- (Mali) Oumar Koné
- (Mali) Cheïbane Traoré
- (Morocco) Zakaria Labyad
- (Morocco) Youness Mokhtar
- (Morocco) Yacine Qasmi
- (Mozambique) José Antonio Cumbe
- (Mozambique) Manuel Uetimane
- (Nigeria) Odion Ighalo
- (Nigeria) Haruna Lukman
- (Nigeria) Ahmed Musa
- (Nigeria) Ganiyu Oseni
- (Nigeria) Danny Uchechi
- (Senegal) Abdoulaye Fall
- (Senegal) Abdoulaye Sané
- (Sierra Leone) Hassan Bai Kamara
- (South Africa) Thamsanqa Sangweni
- (South Africa) Themba Zwane
- (Sudan) Ramadan Alagab
- (Sudan) Nizar Hamid
- (Sudan) Khamis Martin
- (Eswatini) Banele Mdluli
- (Tanzania) Kigi Makasi
- (Tunisia) Ali Maâloul
- (Tunisia) Idriss Mhirsi
- (Tunisia) Youssef Msakni
- (Uganda) Abraham Ndugwa
- (Zambia) Rodrick Kabwe
- (Zambia) Rodgers Kola
- (Zambia) Venicious Mapande
- (Zambia) Derrick Mwansa
- (Zambia) Felix Nyainde

1 own goal

- (South Africa) Ramahlwe Mphahlele (against Libya)
