= 2014 FIFA World Cup squads =

The 2014 FIFA World Cup was an international football tournament that was held in Brazil from 12 June to 13 July 2014. The 32 national teams involved in the tournament were required to register a squad of 23 players, including three goalkeepers. Only players in these squads were eligible to take part in the tournament.

A provisional list of 30 players per national team was submitted to FIFA by 13 May 2014. FIFA published the 30-player provisional lists on their website on 16 May 2014. The final lists of 23 players per national team were submitted to FIFA by 2 June 2014. FIFA published the 23-player final lists, with the squad numbers, on their website, on 5 June 2014. Teams were permitted to make late replacements in the event of serious injury, at any time up to 24 hours before their first game.

The age listed for each player is on 12 June 2014, the first day of the tournament. The number of caps listed for each player does not include any matches played after the start of the 2014 FIFA World Cup. The club listed is the club for which the player last played a competitive match prior to the tournament. The nationality for each club reflects the national association (not the league) to which the club is affiliated.

The Netherlands was the only team to use all of its 23 players during the tournament, making it the fourth team in World Cup history to ever use all of its players in the squad, after France in 1978, and both Greece and Russia in 1994 (although these squads had only 22 players).

== Group A ==
=== Brazil ===
Coach: Luiz Felipe Scolari

The final squad was announced on 7 May 2014. The squad numbers were revealed on 2 June.

No.	Pos.	Player	Date of birth (age)	Caps	Club
1	GK	Jefferson	2 January 1983 (aged 31)	9	(Brazil) Botafogo
2	DF	Dani Alves	6 May 1983 (aged 31)	75	(Spain) Barcelona
3	DF	Thiago Silva (c)	22 September 1984 (aged 29)	46	(France) Paris Saint-Germain
4	DF	David Luiz	22 April 1987 (aged 27)	36	(England) Chelsea
5	MF	Fernandinho	4 May 1985 (aged 29)	7	(England) Manchester City
6	DF	Marcelo	12 May 1988 (aged 26)	31	(Spain) Real Madrid
7	FW	Hulk	25 July 1986 (aged 27)	35	(Russia) Zenit Saint Petersburg
8	MF	Paulinho	25 July 1988 (aged 25)	26	(England) Tottenham Hotspur
9	FW	Fred	3 October 1983 (aged 30)	33	(Brazil) Fluminense
10	FW	Neymar	5 February 1992 (aged 22)	49	(Spain) Barcelona
11	MF	Oscar	9 September 1991 (aged 22)	31	(England) Chelsea
12	GK	Júlio César	3 September 1979 (aged 34)	80	(Canada) Toronto FC
13	DF	Dante	18 October 1983 (aged 30)	12	(Germany) Bayern Munich
14	DF	Maxwell	27 August 1981 (aged 32)	9	(France) Paris Saint-Germain
15	DF	Henrique	14 October 1986 (aged 27)	5	(Italy) Napoli
16	MF	Ramires	24 March 1987 (aged 27)	42	(England) Chelsea
17	MF	Luiz Gustavo	23 July 1987 (aged 26)	19	(Germany) VfL Wolfsburg
18	MF	Hernanes	29 May 1985 (aged 29)	24	(Italy) Inter Milan
19	MF	Willian	9 August 1988 (aged 25)	7	(England) Chelsea
20	FW	Bernard	8 September 1992 (aged 21)	11	(Ukraine) Shakhtar Donetsk
21	FW	Jô	20 March 1987 (aged 27)	17	(Brazil) Atlético Mineiro
22	GK	Victor	21 January 1983 (aged 31)	6	(Brazil) Atlético Mineiro
23	DF	Maicon	26 July 1981 (aged 32)	72	(Italy) Roma

=== Cameroon ===
Coach: (Germany) Volker Finke

The final squad was announced on 2 June 2014.

No.	Pos.	Player	Date of birth (age)	Caps	Club
1	GK	Loïc Feudjou	14 April 1992 (aged 22)	2	(Cameroon) Coton Sport
2	DF	Benoît Assou-Ekotto	24 March 1984 (aged 30)	22	(England) Queens Park Rangers
3	DF	Nicolas Nkoulou	27 March 1990 (aged 24)	48	(France) Marseille
4	DF	Cédric Djeugoué	28 August 1992 (aged 21)	3	(Cameroon) Coton Sport
5	DF	Dany Nounkeu	11 April 1986 (aged 28)	16	(Turkey) Beşiktaş
6	MF	Alex Song	9 September 1987 (aged 26)	47	(Spain) Barcelona
7	MF	Landry N'Guémo	28 November 1985 (aged 28)	40	(France) Bordeaux
8	FW	Benjamin Moukandjo	12 November 1988 (aged 25)	17	(France) Nancy
9	FW	Samuel Eto'o (c)	10 March 1981 (aged 33)	117	(England) Chelsea
10	FW	Vincent Aboubakar	22 January 1992 (aged 22)	24	(France) Lorient
11	MF	Jean Makoun	29 May 1983 (aged 31)	66	(France) Rennes
12	DF	Henri Bedimo	4 June 1984 (aged 30)	31	(France) Lyon
13	FW	Eric Maxim Choupo-Moting	23 March 1989 (aged 25)	26	(Germany) Mainz 05
14	DF	Aurélien Chedjou	20 June 1985 (aged 28)	31	(Turkey) Galatasaray
15	FW	Pierre Webó	20 January 1982 (aged 32)	56	(Turkey) Fenerbahçe
16	GK	Charles Itandje	2 November 1982 (aged 31)	9	(Turkey) Konyaspor
17	MF	Stéphane Mbia	20 May 1986 (aged 28)	49	(Spain) Sevilla
18	MF	Eyong Enoh	23 March 1986 (aged 28)	38	(Turkey) Antalyaspor
19	FW	Fabrice Olinga	12 May 1996 (aged 18)	8	(Belgium) Zulte Waregem
20	MF	Edgar Salli	17 August 1992 (aged 21)	9	(France) Lens
21	MF	Joël Matip	8 August 1991 (aged 22)	23	(Germany) Schalke 04
22	DF	Allan Nyom	10 May 1988 (aged 26)	10	(Spain) Granada
23	GK	Sammy Ndjock	25 February 1990 (aged 24)	3	(Turkey) Fethiyespor

=== Croatia ===
Coach: Niko Kovač

The final squad was announced on 31 May 2014. With less than 48 hours until the opening game against Brazil, Milan Badelj was called up to replace the injured Ivan Močinić, after having previously been excluded from the final squad.

No.	Pos.	Player	Date of birth (age)	Caps	Club
1	GK	Stipe Pletikosa	8 January 1979 (aged 35)	111	(Russia) Rostov
2	DF	Šime Vrsaljko	10 January 1992 (aged 22)	7	(Italy) Genoa
3	DF	Danijel Pranjić	2 December 1981 (aged 32)	50	(Greece) Panathinaikos
4	FW	Ivan Perišić	2 February 1989 (aged 25)	29	(Germany) VfL Wolfsburg
5	DF	Vedran Ćorluka	5 February 1986 (aged 28)	72	(Russia) Lokomotiv Moscow
6	DF	Dejan Lovren	5 July 1989 (aged 24)	25	(England) Southampton
7	MF	Ivan Rakitić	10 March 1988 (aged 26)	62	(Spain) Sevilla
8	DF	Ognjen Vukojević	20 December 1983 (aged 30)	55	(Ukraine) Dynamo Kyiv
9	FW	Nikica Jelavić	27 August 1985 (aged 28)	33	(England) Hull City
10	MF	Luka Modrić	9 September 1985 (aged 28)	75	(Spain) Real Madrid
11	DF	Darijo Srna (c)	1 May 1982 (aged 32)	112	(Ukraine) Shakhtar Donetsk
12	GK	Oliver Zelenika	14 May 1993 (aged 21)	0	(Croatia) Lokomotiva
13	DF	Gordon Schildenfeld	18 March 1985 (aged 29)	21	(Greece) Panathinaikos
14	MF	Marcelo Brozović	16 November 1992 (aged 21)	1	(Croatia) Dinamo Zagreb
15	MF	Milan Badelj	25 February 1989 (aged 25)	9	(Germany) Hamburger SV
16	FW	Ante Rebić	21 September 1993 (aged 20)	5	(Italy) Fiorentina
17	FW	Mario Mandžukić	21 May 1986 (aged 28)	50	(Germany) Bayern Munich
18	FW	Ivica Olić	14 September 1979 (aged 34)	92	(Germany) VfL Wolfsburg
19	MF	Sammir	23 April 1987 (aged 27)	6	(Spain) Getafe
20	MF	Mateo Kovačić	6 May 1994 (aged 20)	10	(Italy) Inter Milan
21	DF	Domagoj Vida	29 April 1989 (aged 25)	23	(Ukraine) Dynamo Kyiv
22	FW	Eduardo	25 February 1983 (aged 31)	63	(Ukraine) Shakhtar Donetsk
23	GK	Danijel Subašić	27 October 1984 (aged 29)	6	(France) Monaco

=== Mexico ===
Coach: Miguel Herrera

The final squad was announced on 9 May 2014. However, midfielders Luis Montes and Juan Carlos Medina sustained injuries afterwards and were replaced by Javier Aquino and Miguel Ángel Ponce.

No.	Pos.	Player	Date of birth (age)	Caps	Club
1	GK	Jesús Corona	26 January 1981 (aged 33)	34	(Mexico) Cruz Azul
2	DF	Francisco Javier Rodríguez	20 October 1981 (aged 32)	95	(Mexico) América
3	DF	Carlos Salcido	2 April 1980 (aged 34)	122	(Mexico) Tigres UANL
4	DF	Rafael Márquez (c)	13 February 1979 (aged 35)	120	(Mexico) León
5	DF	Diego Reyes	19 September 1992 (aged 21)	14	(Portugal) Porto
6	MF	Héctor Herrera	19 April 1990 (aged 24)	13	(Portugal) Porto
7	DF	Miguel Layún	25 June 1988 (aged 25)	15	(Mexico) América
8	MF	Marco Fabián	21 July 1989 (aged 24)	15	(Mexico) Cruz Azul
9	FW	Raúl Jiménez	5 May 1991 (aged 23)	25	(Mexico) América
10	MF	Giovani dos Santos	11 May 1989 (aged 25)	76	(Spain) Villarreal
11	FW	Alan Pulido	8 March 1991 (aged 23)	6	(Mexico) Tigres UANL
12	GK	Alfredo Talavera	18 September 1982 (aged 31)	14	(Mexico) Toluca
13	GK	Guillermo Ochoa	13 July 1985 (aged 28)	59	(France) Ajaccio
14	FW	Javier Hernández	1 June 1988 (aged 26)	62	(England) Manchester United
15	DF	Héctor Moreno	17 January 1988 (aged 26)	53	(Spain) Espanyol
16	DF	Miguel Ángel Ponce	12 April 1989 (aged 25)	8	(Mexico) Toluca
17	MF	Isaác Brizuela	28 August 1990 (aged 23)	7	(Mexico) Toluca
18	MF	Andrés Guardado	28 September 1986 (aged 27)	104	(Germany) Bayer Leverkusen
19	FW	Oribe Peralta	12 January 1984 (aged 30)	33	(Mexico) Santos Laguna
20	MF	Javier Aquino	11 February 1990 (aged 24)	22	(Spain) Villarreal
21	MF	Carlos Peña	29 March 1990 (aged 24)	16	(Mexico) León
22	DF	Paul Aguilar	6 March 1986 (aged 28)	30	(Mexico) América
23	MF	José Juan Vázquez	14 March 1988 (aged 26)	5	(Mexico) León

== Group B ==
=== Australia ===
Coach: Ange Postecoglou

The final squad was announced on 3 June 2014.

No.	Pos.	Player	Date of birth (age)	Caps	Club
1	GK	Mathew Ryan	8 April 1992 (aged 22)	7	(Belgium) Club Brugge
2	DF	Ivan Franjic	10 September 1987 (aged 26)	9	(Australia) Brisbane Roar
3	DF	Jason Davidson	29 June 1991 (aged 22)	7	(Netherlands) Heracles Almelo
4	FW	Tim Cahill	6 December 1979 (aged 34)	69	(United States) New York Red Bulls
5	MF	Mark Milligan	4 August 1985 (aged 28)	29	(Australia) Melbourne Victory
6	DF	Matthew Spiranovic	27 June 1988 (aged 25)	18	(Australia) Western Sydney Wanderers
7	FW	Mathew Leckie	4 February 1991 (aged 23)	8	(Germany) FSV Frankfurt
8	DF	Bailey Wright	28 July 1992 (aged 21)	0	(England) Preston North End
9	FW	Adam Taggart	2 June 1993 (aged 21)	5	(Australia) Newcastle Jets
10	MF	Ben Halloran	14 June 1992 (aged 21)	2	(Germany) Fortuna Düsseldorf
11	MF	Tommy Oar	10 December 1991 (aged 22)	15	(Netherlands) Utrecht
12	GK	Mitchell Langerak	22 August 1988 (aged 25)	3	(Germany) Borussia Dortmund
13	MF	Oliver Bozanic	8 January 1989 (aged 25)	3	(Switzerland) Luzern
14	MF	James Troisi	3 July 1988 (aged 25)	11	(Australia) Melbourne Victory
15	MF	Mile Jedinak (c)	3 August 1984 (aged 29)	44	(England) Crystal Palace
16	MF	James Holland	15 May 1989 (aged 25)	14	Austria Wien
17	MF	Matt McKay	11 January 1983 (aged 31)	47	(Australia) Brisbane Roar
18	GK	Eugene Galekovic	12 June 1981 (aged 33)	8	(Australia) Adelaide United
19	DF	Ryan McGowan	15 August 1989 (aged 24)	9	(China) Shandong Luneng Taishan
20	MF	Dario Vidošić	8 April 1987 (aged 27)	23	(Switzerland) Sion
21	MF	Massimo Luongo	25 September 1992 (aged 21)	1	(England) Swindon Town
22	DF	Alex Wilkinson	13 August 1984 (aged 29)	3	(South Korea) Jeonbuk Hyundai Motors
23	MF	Mark Bresciano	11 February 1980 (aged 34)	74	(Qatar) Al-Gharafa

=== Chile ===
Coach: (Argentina) Jorge Sampaoli

The final squad was announced on 1 June 2014.

No.	Pos.	Player	Date of birth (age)	Caps	Club
1	GK	Claudio Bravo (c)	13 April 1983 (aged 31)	79	(Spain) Real Sociedad
2	DF	Eugenio Mena	18 July 1988 (aged 25)	25	(Brazil) Santos
3	DF	Miiko Albornoz	30 November 1990 (aged 23)	2	(Sweden) Malmö FF
4	DF	Mauricio Isla	12 June 1988 (aged 26)	47	(Italy) Juventus
5	MF	Francisco Silva	11 February 1986 (aged 28)	12	(Spain) Osasuna
6	MF	Carlos Carmona	21 February 1987 (aged 27)	44	(Italy) Atalanta
7	FW	Alexis Sánchez	19 December 1988 (aged 25)	67	(Spain) Barcelona
8	DF	Arturo Vidal	22 May 1987 (aged 27)	54	(Italy) Juventus
9	FW	Mauricio Pinilla	4 February 1984 (aged 30)	27	(Italy) Cagliari
10	MF	Jorge Valdivia	19 October 1983 (aged 30)	57	(Brazil) Palmeiras
11	FW	Eduardo Vargas	20 November 1989 (aged 24)	30	(Spain) Valencia
12	GK	Cristopher Toselli	22 June 1988 (aged 25)	4	(Chile) Universidad Católica
13	DF	José Manuel Rojas	23 June 1983 (aged 30)	19	Universidad de Chile
14	MF	Fabián Orellana	27 January 1986 (aged 28)	26	(Spain) Celta Vigo
15	MF	Jean Beausejour	1 June 1984 (aged 30)	59	(England) Wigan Athletic
16	MF	Felipe Gutiérrez	8 October 1990 (aged 23)	18	(Netherlands) Twente
17	DF	Gary Medel	3 August 1987 (aged 26)	61	(Wales) Cardiff City
18	DF	Gonzalo Jara	29 August 1985 (aged 28)	65	(England) Nottingham Forest
19	MF	José Pedro Fuenzalida	22 February 1985 (aged 29)	23	(Chile) Colo-Colo
20	MF	Charles Aránguiz	17 April 1989 (aged 25)	21	(Brazil) Internacional
21	MF	Marcelo Díaz	30 December 1986 (aged 27)	21	(Switzerland) Basel
22	FW	Esteban Paredes	1 August 1980 (aged 33)	35	(Chile) Colo-Colo
23	GK	Johnny Herrera	9 May 1981 (aged 33)	8	Universidad de Chile

=== Netherlands ===
Coach: Louis van Gaal

The final squad was announced on 31 May 2014. The squad numbers were revealed on 2 June, during a press conference with Van Gaal.

No.	Pos.	Player	Date of birth (age)	Caps	Club
1	GK	Jasper Cillessen	22 April 1989 (aged 25)	8	(Netherlands) Ajax
2	DF	Ron Vlaar	16 February 1985 (aged 29)	24	(England) Aston Villa
3	DF	Stefan de Vrij	5 February 1992 (aged 22)	12	(Netherlands) Feyenoord
4	DF	Bruno Martins Indi	8 February 1992 (aged 22)	16	(Netherlands) Feyenoord
5	DF	Daley Blind	9 March 1990 (aged 24)	12	(Netherlands) Ajax
6	MF	Nigel de Jong	30 November 1984 (aged 29)	71	(Italy) Milan
7	DF	Daryl Janmaat	22 July 1989 (aged 24)	16	(Netherlands) Feyenoord
8	MF	Jonathan de Guzmán	13 September 1987 (aged 26)	10	(Wales) Swansea City
9	FW	Robin van Persie (c)	6 August 1983 (aged 30)	85	(England) Manchester United
10	MF	Wesley Sneijder	9 June 1984 (aged 30)	99	(Turkey) Galatasaray
11	FW	Arjen Robben	23 January 1984 (aged 30)	75	(Germany) Bayern Munich
12	DF	Paul Verhaegh	1 September 1983 (aged 30)	2	(Germany) FC Augsburg
13	DF	Joël Veltman	15 January 1992 (aged 22)	2	(Netherlands) Ajax
14	DF	Terence Kongolo	14 February 1994 (aged 20)	1	(Netherlands) Feyenoord
15	DF	Dirk Kuyt	22 July 1980 (aged 33)	98	(Turkey) Fenerbahçe
16	MF	Jordy Clasie	27 June 1991 (aged 22)	8	(Netherlands) Feyenoord
17	FW	Jeremain Lens	24 November 1987 (aged 26)	22	(Ukraine) Dynamo Kyiv
18	MF	Leroy Fer	5 January 1990 (aged 24)	6	(England) Norwich City
19	FW	Klaas-Jan Huntelaar	12 August 1983 (aged 30)	62	(Germany) Schalke 04
20	MF	Georginio Wijnaldum	11 November 1990 (aged 23)	5	(Netherlands) PSV Eindhoven
21	FW	Memphis Depay	13 February 1994 (aged 20)	6	(Netherlands) PSV Eindhoven
22	GK	Michel Vorm	20 October 1983 (aged 30)	14	(Wales) Swansea City
23	GK	Tim Krul	3 April 1988 (aged 26)	5	(England) Newcastle United

=== Spain ===
Coach: Vicente del Bosque

The final squad was announced on 31 May 2014. The squad numbers were revealed on 3 June.

No.	Pos.	Player	Date of birth (age)	Caps	Club
1	GK	Iker Casillas (c)	20 May 1981 (aged 33)	154	(Spain) Real Madrid
2	DF	Raúl Albiol	4 September 1985 (aged 28)	46	(Italy) Napoli
3	DF	Gerard Piqué	2 February 1987 (aged 27)	60	(Spain) Barcelona
4	MF	Javi Martínez	2 September 1988 (aged 25)	17	(Germany) Bayern Munich
5	DF	Juanfran	9 January 1985 (aged 29)	8	(Spain) Atlético Madrid
6	MF	Andrés Iniesta	11 May 1984 (aged 30)	97	(Spain) Barcelona
7	FW	David Villa	3 December 1981 (aged 32)	96	(Spain) Atlético Madrid
8	MF	Xavi	25 January 1980 (aged 34)	132	(Spain) Barcelona
9	FW	Fernando Torres	20 March 1984 (aged 30)	107	(England) Chelsea
10	MF	Cesc Fàbregas	4 May 1987 (aged 27)	89	(Spain) Barcelona
11	FW	Pedro	28 July 1987 (aged 26)	40	(Spain) Barcelona
12	GK	David de Gea	7 November 1990 (aged 23)	1	(England) Manchester United
13	MF	Juan Mata	28 April 1988 (aged 26)	33	(England) Manchester United
14	MF	Xabi Alonso	25 November 1981 (aged 32)	111	(Spain) Real Madrid
15	DF	Sergio Ramos	30 March 1986 (aged 28)	117	(Spain) Real Madrid
16	MF	Sergio Busquets	16 July 1988 (aged 25)	65	(Spain) Barcelona
17	MF	Koke	8 January 1992 (aged 22)	8	(Spain) Atlético Madrid
18	DF	Jordi Alba	21 March 1989 (aged 25)	26	(Spain) Barcelona
19	FW	Diego Costa	7 October 1988 (aged 25)	2	(Spain) Atlético Madrid
20	MF	Santi Cazorla	13 December 1984 (aged 29)	64	(England) Arsenal
21	MF	David Silva	8 January 1986 (aged 28)	80	(England) Manchester City
22	DF	César Azpilicueta	28 August 1989 (aged 24)	6	(England) Chelsea
23	GK	Pepe Reina	31 August 1982 (aged 31)	32	(Italy) Napoli

== Group C ==
=== Colombia ===
Coach: (Argentina) José Pékerman

The final squad was announced on 2 June 2014. However, midfielder Aldo Leão Ramírez sustained injury afterwards and was replaced by Carlos Carbonero.

No.	Pos.	Player	Date of birth (age)	Caps	Club
1	GK	David Ospina	31 August 1988 (aged 25)	44	(France) Nice
2	DF	Cristián Zapata	30 September 1986 (aged 27)	24	(Italy) Milan
3	DF	Mario Yepes (c)	13 January 1976 (aged 38)	98	(Italy) Atalanta
4	DF	Santiago Arias	13 January 1992 (aged 22)	6	(Netherlands) PSV Eindhoven
5	MF	Carlos Carbonero	25 July 1990 (aged 23)	1	(Argentina) River Plate
6	MF	Carlos Sánchez	6 February 1986 (aged 28)	44	(Spain) Elche
7	DF	Pablo Armero	2 November 1986 (aged 27)	53	(England) West Ham United
8	DF	Abel Aguilar	6 January 1985 (aged 29)	49	(France) Toulouse
9	FW	Teófilo Gutiérrez	17 May 1985 (aged 29)	30	(Argentina) River Plate
10	MF	James Rodríguez	12 July 1991 (aged 22)	22	(France) Monaco
11	MF	Juan Cuadrado	26 May 1988 (aged 26)	28	(Italy) Fiorentina
12	GK	Camilo Vargas	9 March 1989 (aged 25)	0	(Colombia) Santa Fe
13	MF	Fredy Guarín	30 June 1986 (aged 27)	49	(Italy) Inter Milan
14	FW	Víctor Ibarbo	19 May 1990 (aged 24)	9	(Italy) Cagliari
15	MF	Alexander Mejía	11 July 1988 (aged 25)	8	(Colombia) Atlético Nacional
16	DF	Éder Álvarez Balanta	28 February 1993 (aged 21)	3	(Argentina) River Plate
17	FW	Carlos Bacca	8 September 1986 (aged 27)	11	(Spain) Sevilla
18	DF	Juan Camilo Zúñiga	14 December 1985 (aged 28)	50	(Italy) Napoli
19	FW	Adrián Ramos	22 January 1986 (aged 28)	26	(Germany) Hertha BSC
20	MF	Juan Fernando Quintero	18 January 1993 (aged 21)	4	(Portugal) Porto
21	FW	Jackson Martínez	3 October 1986 (aged 27)	27	(Portugal) Porto
22	GK	Faryd Mondragón	21 June 1971 (aged 42)	50	(Colombia) Deportivo Cali
23	DF	Carlos Valdés	22 May 1985 (aged 29)	14	(Argentina) San Lorenzo

=== Greece ===
Coach: (Portugal) Fernando Santos

The final squad was announced on 19 May 2014.

No.	Pos.	Player	Date of birth (age)	Caps	Club
1	GK	Orestis Karnezis	11 July 1985 (aged 28)	19	(Spain) Granada
2	MF	Giannis Maniatis	12 October 1986 (aged 27)	30	(Greece) Olympiacos
3	DF	Giorgos Tzavellas	26 November 1987 (aged 26)	13	(Greece) PAOK
4	DF	Kostas Manolas	14 June 1991 (aged 22)	9	(Greece) Olympiacos
5	DF	Vangelis Moras	26 August 1981 (aged 32)	19	(Italy) Hellas Verona
6	MF	Alexandros Tziolis	13 February 1985 (aged 29)	49	(Turkey) Kayserispor
7	FW	Georgios Samaras	21 February 1985 (aged 29)	74	(Scotland) Celtic
8	MF	Panagiotis Kone	26 July 1987 (aged 26)	16	(Italy) Bologna
9	FW	Kostas Mitroglou	12 March 1988 (aged 26)	32	(England) Fulham
10	MF	Giorgos Karagounis (c)	6 March 1977 (aged 37)	135	(England) Fulham
11	DF	Loukas Vyntra	5 February 1981 (aged 33)	50	(Spain) Levante
12	GK	Panagiotis Glykos	3 June 1986 (aged 28)	2	(Greece) PAOK
13	GK	Stefanos Kapino	18 March 1994 (aged 20)	2	(Greece) Panathinaikos
14	FW	Dimitris Salpingidis	18 August 1981 (aged 32)	76	(Greece) PAOK
15	DF	Vasilis Torosidis	10 June 1985 (aged 29)	66	(Italy) Roma
16	MF	Lazaros Christodoulopoulos	19 December 1986 (aged 27)	19	(Italy) Bologna
17	FW	Theofanis Gekas	23 May 1980 (aged 34)	72	(Turkey) Konyaspor
18	MF	Giannis Fetfatzidis	21 December 1990 (aged 23)	19	(Italy) Genoa
19	DF	Sokratis Papastathopoulos	9 June 1988 (aged 26)	47	(Germany) Borussia Dortmund
20	DF	José Holebas	27 June 1984 (aged 29)	22	(Greece) Olympiacos
21	MF	Kostas Katsouranis	21 June 1979 (aged 34)	111	(Greece) PAOK
22	MF	Andreas Samaris	13 June 1989 (aged 24)	4	(Greece) Olympiacos
23	MF	Panagiotis Tachtsidis	15 February 1991 (aged 23)	6	(Italy) Torino

=== Ivory Coast ===
Coach: (France) Sabri Lamouchi

The final squad was announced on 1 June 2014.

No.	Pos.	Player	Date of birth (age)	Caps	Club
1	GK	Boubacar Barry	30 December 1979 (aged 34)	77	(Belgium) Lokeren
2	DF	Ousmane Viera	21 December 1986 (aged 27)	1	(Turkey) Çaykur Rizespor
3	DF	Arthur Boka	2 April 1983 (aged 31)	78	(Germany) VfB Stuttgart
4	DF	Kolo Touré	19 March 1981 (aged 33)	107	(England) Liverpool
5	DF	Didier Zokora	14 December 1980 (aged 33)	119	(Turkey) Trabzonspor
6	FW	Mathis Bolly	14 November 1990 (aged 23)	4	(Germany) Fortuna Düsseldorf
7	DF	Jean-Daniel Akpa Akpro	11 October 1992 (aged 21)	1	(France) Toulouse
8	FW	Salomon Kalou	5 August 1985 (aged 28)	67	(France) Lille
9	MF	Cheick Tioté	21 June 1986 (aged 27)	43	(England) Newcastle United
10	FW	Gervinho	27 May 1987 (aged 27)	53	(Italy) Roma
11	FW	Didier Drogba (c)	11 March 1978 (aged 36)	101	(Turkey) Galatasaray
12	FW	Wilfried Bony	10 December 1988 (aged 25)	24	(Wales) Swansea City
13	FW	Didier Ya Konan	22 May 1984 (aged 30)	25	(Germany) Hannover 96
14	MF	Ismaël Diomandé	28 August 1992 (aged 21)	2	(France) Saint-Étienne
15	FW	Max Gradel	30 November 1987 (aged 26)	26	(France) Saint-Étienne
16	GK	Sylvain Gbohouo	29 October 1988 (aged 25)	2	(Ivory Coast) Séwé Sport
17	DF	Serge Aurier	24 December 1992 (aged 21)	8	(France) Toulouse
18	DF	Constant Djakpa	17 October 1986 (aged 27)	5	(Germany) Eintracht Frankfurt
19	MF	Yaya Touré	13 May 1983 (aged 31)	82	(England) Manchester City
20	MF	Serey Dié	7 November 1984 (aged 29)	7	(Switzerland) Basel
21	FW	Giovanni Sio	31 March 1989 (aged 25)	7	(Switzerland) Basel
22	DF	Sol Bamba	13 January 1985 (aged 29)	43	(Turkey) Trabzonspor
23	GK	Sayouba Mandé	15 June 1993 (aged 20)	1	(Norway) Stabæk

=== Japan ===
Coach: (Italy) Alberto Zaccheroni

The final squad was announced on 12 May 2014. The squad numbers were revealed on 25 May.

No.	Pos.	Player	Date of birth (age)	Caps	Club
1	GK	Eiji Kawashima	20 March 1983 (aged 31)	56	(Belgium) Standard Liège
2	DF	Atsuto Uchida	27 March 1988 (aged 26)	68	(Germany) Schalke 04
3	DF	Gōtoku Sakai	14 March 1991 (aged 23)	12	(Germany) VfB Stuttgart
4	MF	Keisuke Honda	13 June 1986 (aged 27)	56	(Italy) Milan
5	DF	Yūto Nagatomo	12 September 1986 (aged 27)	70	(Italy) Inter Milan
6	DF	Masato Morishige	21 May 1987 (aged 27)	10	(Japan) FC Tokyo
7	MF	Yasuhito Endo	28 January 1980 (aged 34)	144	(Japan) Gamba Osaka
8	MF	Hiroshi Kiyotake	12 November 1989 (aged 24)	25	(Germany) 1. FC Nürnberg
9	FW	Shinji Okazaki	16 April 1986 (aged 28)	76	(Germany) Mainz 05
10	MF	Shinji Kagawa	17 March 1989 (aged 25)	57	(England) Manchester United
11	FW	Yoichiro Kakitani	3 January 1990 (aged 24)	12	(Japan) Cerezo Osaka
12	GK	Shusaku Nishikawa	18 June 1986 (aged 27)	13	(Japan) Urawa Red Diamonds
13	FW	Yoshito Ōkubo	9 June 1982 (aged 32)	57	(Japan) Kawasaki Frontale
14	MF	Toshihiro Aoyama	22 February 1986 (aged 28)	6	(Japan) Sanfrecce Hiroshima
15	DF	Yasuyuki Konno	25 January 1983 (aged 31)	81	(Japan) Gamba Osaka
16	MF	Hotaru Yamaguchi	6 October 1990 (aged 23)	12	(Japan) Cerezo Osaka
17	MF	Makoto Hasebe (c)	18 January 1984 (aged 30)	78	(Germany) 1. FC Nürnberg
18	FW	Yuya Osako	18 May 1990 (aged 24)	9	(Germany) 1860 Munich
19	DF	Masahiko Inoha	28 August 1983 (aged 30)	21	(Japan) Júbilo Iwata
20	FW	Manabu Saitō	4 April 1990 (aged 24)	5	(Japan) Yokohama F. Marinos
21	DF	Hiroki Sakai	12 April 1990 (aged 24)	18	(Germany) Hannover 96
22	DF	Maya Yoshida	24 August 1988 (aged 25)	41	(England) Southampton
23	GK	Shūichi Gonda	3 March 1989 (aged 25)	2	(Japan) FC Tokyo

== Group D ==
=== Costa Rica ===
Coach: (Colombia) Jorge Luis Pinto

The final squad was announced on 31 May 2014.

No.	Pos.	Player	Date of birth (age)	Caps	Club
1	GK	Keylor Navas	15 December 1986 (aged 27)	53	(Spain) Levante
2	DF	Jhonny Acosta	21 July 1983 (aged 30)	25	(Costa Rica) Alajuelense
3	DF	Giancarlo González	8 February 1988 (aged 26)	35	(United States) Columbus Crew
4	DF	Michael Umaña	16 July 1982 (aged 31)	83	(Costa Rica) Saprissa
5	MF	Celso Borges	27 May 1988 (aged 26)	63	(Sweden) AIK
6	DF	Óscar Duarte	3 June 1989 (aged 25)	11	(Belgium) Club Brugge
7	MF	Christian Bolaños	17 May 1984 (aged 30)	55	(Denmark) Copenhagen
8	DF	David Myrie	1 June 1988 (aged 26)	10	(Costa Rica) Herediano
9	FW	Joel Campbell	26 June 1992 (aged 21)	33	(Greece) Olympiacos
10	FW	Bryan Ruiz (c)	18 August 1985 (aged 28)	63	(Netherlands) PSV Eindhoven
11	MF	Michael Barrantes	4 October 1983 (aged 30)	50	(Norway) Aalesund
12	DF	Waylon Francis	20 September 1990 (aged 23)	1	(United States) Columbus Crew
13	MF	Óscar Granados	25 October 1985 (aged 28)	11	(Costa Rica) Herediano
14	FW	Randall Brenes	13 August 1983 (aged 30)	39	(Costa Rica) Cartaginés
15	DF	Júnior Díaz	12 September 1983 (aged 30)	62	(Germany) Mainz 05
16	DF	Cristian Gamboa	24 October 1989 (aged 24)	25	(Norway) Rosenborg
17	MF	Yeltsin Tejeda	17 March 1992 (aged 22)	22	(Costa Rica) Saprissa
18	GK	Patrick Pemberton	24 April 1982 (aged 32)	21	(Costa Rica) Alajuelense
19	DF	Roy Miller	24 November 1984 (aged 29)	48	(United States) New York Red Bulls
20	MF	Diego Calvo	25 March 1991 (aged 23)	10	(Norway) Vålerenga
21	FW	Marco Ureña	5 March 1990 (aged 24)	24	(Russia) Kuban Krasnodar
22	MF	José Miguel Cubero	14 February 1987 (aged 27)	35	(Costa Rica) Herediano
23	GK	Daniel Cambronero	8 January 1986 (aged 28)	4	(Costa Rica) Herediano

=== England ===
Coach: Roy Hodgson

England's final squad was announced on 12 May 2014, including seven standby squad members: John Ruddy, Jon Flanagan, John Stones, Michael Carrick, Tom Cleverley, Andy Carroll and Jermain Defoe. Of those seven, only Stones and Flanagan joined the rest of the squad at a training camp in Portugal, with Stones serving as a like-for-like replacement option for Phil Jones, who was still recovering from a shoulder injury. Both Stones and Flanagan travelled with the squad to their pre-tournament training base in Miami, and remained with the team in Brazil in the event of any injuries prior to the opening game. The squad numbers were revealed on 22 May.

No.	Pos.	Player	Date of birth (age)	Caps	Club
1	GK	Joe Hart	19 April 1987 (aged 27)	41	(England) Manchester City
2	DF	Glen Johnson	23 August 1984 (aged 29)	52	(England) Liverpool
3	DF	Leighton Baines	11 December 1984 (aged 29)	24	(England) Everton
4	MF	Steven Gerrard (c)	30 May 1980 (aged 34)	111	(England) Liverpool
5	DF	Gary Cahill	19 December 1985 (aged 28)	24	(England) Chelsea
6	DF	Phil Jagielka	17 August 1982 (aged 31)	26	(England) Everton
7	MF	Jack Wilshere	1 January 1992 (aged 22)	18	(England) Arsenal
8	MF	Frank Lampard	20 June 1978 (aged 35)	105	(England) Chelsea
9	FW	Daniel Sturridge	1 September 1989 (aged 24)	12	(England) Liverpool
10	FW	Wayne Rooney	24 October 1985 (aged 28)	92	(England) Manchester United
11	FW	Danny Welbeck	26 November 1990 (aged 23)	24	(England) Manchester United
12	DF	Chris Smalling	22 November 1989 (aged 24)	12	(England) Manchester United
13	GK	Ben Foster	3 April 1983 (aged 31)	7	(England) West Bromwich Albion
14	MF	Jordan Henderson	17 June 1990 (aged 23)	11	(England) Liverpool
15	MF	Alex Oxlade-Chamberlain	15 August 1993 (aged 20)	15	(England) Arsenal
16	DF	Phil Jones	21 February 1992 (aged 22)	10	(England) Manchester United
17	MF	James Milner	4 January 1986 (aged 28)	47	(England) Manchester City
18	FW	Rickie Lambert	16 February 1982 (aged 32)	6	(England) Southampton
19	MF	Raheem Sterling	8 December 1994 (aged 19)	4	(England) Liverpool
20	MF	Adam Lallana	10 May 1988 (aged 26)	6	(England) Southampton
21	MF	Ross Barkley	5 December 1993 (aged 20)	6	(England) Everton
22	GK	Fraser Forster	17 March 1988 (aged 26)	2	(Scotland) Celtic
23	DF	Luke Shaw	12 July 1995 (aged 18)	2	(England) Southampton

=== Italy ===
Coach: Cesare Prandelli

The final squad was announced on 1 June 2014. The squad numbers were revealed the next day.

No.	Pos.	Player	Date of birth (age)	Caps	Club
1	GK	Gianluigi Buffon (c)	28 January 1978 (aged 36)	140	(Italy) Juventus
2	DF	Mattia De Sciglio	20 October 1992 (aged 21)	11	(Italy) Milan
3	DF	Giorgio Chiellini	14 August 1984 (aged 29)	68	(Italy) Juventus
4	DF	Matteo Darmian	2 December 1989 (aged 24)	1	(Italy) Torino
5	MF	Thiago Motta	28 August 1982 (aged 31)	20	(France) Paris Saint-Germain
6	MF	Antonio Candreva	28 February 1987 (aged 27)	20	(Italy) Lazio
7	DF	Ignazio Abate	12 November 1986 (aged 27)	20	(Italy) Milan
8	MF	Claudio Marchisio	19 January 1986 (aged 28)	44	(Italy) Juventus
9	FW	Mario Balotelli	12 August 1990 (aged 23)	30	(Italy) Milan
10	FW	Antonio Cassano	12 July 1982 (aged 31)	37	(Italy) Parma
11	FW	Alessio Cerci	23 July 1987 (aged 26)	12	(Italy) Torino
12	GK	Salvatore Sirigu	12 January 1987 (aged 27)	8	(France) Paris Saint-Germain
13	GK	Mattia Perin	10 November 1992 (aged 21)	0	(Italy) Genoa
14	MF	Alberto Aquilani	7 July 1984 (aged 29)	35	(Italy) Fiorentina
15	DF	Andrea Barzagli	8 May 1981 (aged 33)	47	(Italy) Juventus
16	MF	Daniele De Rossi	24 July 1983 (aged 30)	95	(Italy) Roma
17	FW	Ciro Immobile	20 February 1990 (aged 24)	2	(Italy) Torino
18	MF	Marco Parolo	25 January 1985 (aged 29)	4	(Italy) Parma
19	DF	Leonardo Bonucci	1 May 1987 (aged 27)	37	(Italy) Juventus
20	DF	Gabriel Paletta	15 February 1986 (aged 28)	2	(Italy) Parma
21	MF	Andrea Pirlo	19 May 1979 (aged 35)	109	(Italy) Juventus
22	FW	Lorenzo Insigne	4 June 1991 (aged 23)	5	(Italy) Napoli
23	MF	Marco Verratti	5 November 1992 (aged 21)	6	(France) Paris Saint-Germain

=== Uruguay ===
Coach: Óscar Tabárez

The final squad was announced on 31 May 2014.

No.	Pos.	Player	Date of birth (age)	Caps	Club
1	GK	Fernando Muslera	16 June 1986 (aged 27)	58	(Turkey) Galatasaray
2	DF	Diego Lugano	2 November 1980 (aged 33)	94	(England) West Bromwich Albion
3	DF	Diego Godín (c)	16 February 1986 (aged 28)	77	(Spain) Atlético Madrid
4	DF	Jorge Fucile	19 November 1984 (aged 29)	42	(Portugal) Porto
5	MF	Walter Gargano	23 July 1984 (aged 29)	63	(Italy) Parma
6	DF	Álvaro Pereira	28 November 1985 (aged 28)	57	(Brazil) São Paulo
7	MF	Cristian Rodríguez	30 September 1985 (aged 28)	73	(Spain) Atlético Madrid
8	FW	Abel Hernández	8 August 1990 (aged 23)	12	(Italy) Palermo
9	FW	Luis Suárez	24 January 1987 (aged 27)	77	(England) Liverpool
10	FW	Diego Forlán	19 May 1979 (aged 35)	110	(Japan) Cerezo Osaka
11	FW	Cristhian Stuani	12 October 1986 (aged 27)	10	(Spain) Espanyol
12	GK	Rodrigo Muñoz	22 January 1982 (aged 32)	0	(Paraguay) Libertad
13	DF	José María Giménez	20 January 1995 (aged 19)	6	(Spain) Atlético Madrid
14	MF	Nicolás Lodeiro	21 March 1989 (aged 25)	26	(Brazil) Botafogo
15	MF	Diego Pérez	18 May 1980 (aged 34)	89	(Italy) Bologna
16	DF	Maxi Pereira	8 June 1984 (aged 30)	90	(Portugal) Benfica
17	MF	Egidio Arévalo Ríos	1 January 1982 (aged 32)	55	(Mexico) Morelia
18	MF	Gastón Ramírez	2 December 1990 (aged 23)	29	(England) Southampton
19	DF	Sebastián Coates	7 October 1990 (aged 23)	15	(Uruguay) Nacional
20	MF	Álvaro González	29 October 1984 (aged 29)	43	(Italy) Lazio
21	FW	Edinson Cavani	14 February 1987 (aged 27)	62	(France) Paris Saint-Germain
22	DF	Martín Cáceres	7 April 1987 (aged 27)	57	(Italy) Juventus
23	GK	Martín Silva	25 March 1983 (aged 31)	4	(Brazil) Vasco da Gama

== Group E ==
=== Ecuador ===
Coach: (Colombia) Reinaldo Rueda

The final squad was announced on 2 June 2014. The squad numbers were revealed the next day. However, midfielder Segundo Castillo was replaced by Oswaldo Minda after injuring ligaments in his right knee.

No.	Pos.	Player	Date of birth (age)	Caps	Club
1	GK	Máximo Banguera	16 December 1985 (aged 28)	25	(Ecuador) Barcelona SC
2	DF	Jorge Guagua	28 September 1981 (aged 32)	59	(Ecuador) Emelec
3	DF	Frickson Erazo	5 May 1988 (aged 26)	37	(Brazil) Flamengo
4	DF	Juan Carlos Paredes	8 July 1987 (aged 26)	38	(Ecuador) Barcelona SC
5	MF	Renato Ibarra	20 January 1991 (aged 23)	18	(Netherlands) Vitesse
6	MF	Christian Noboa	9 April 1985 (aged 29)	42	(Russia) Dynamo Moscow
7	MF	Jefferson Montero	1 September 1989 (aged 24)	40	(Mexico) Morelia
8	FW	Édison Méndez	16 March 1979 (aged 35)	110	(Colombia) Santa Fe
9	FW	Joao Rojas	14 June 1989 (aged 24)	30	(Mexico) Cruz Azul
10	DF	Walter Ayoví	11 August 1979 (aged 34)	90	(Mexico) Pachuca
11	FW	Felipe Caicedo	5 September 1988 (aged 25)	50	(United Arab Emirates) Al Jazira
12	GK	Adrián Bone	8 September 1988 (aged 25)	3	(Ecuador) El Nacional
13	FW	Enner Valencia	4 November 1989 (aged 24)	10	(Mexico) Pachuca
14	MF	Oswaldo Minda	26 July 1983 (aged 30)	18	(United States) Chivas USA
15	MF	Michael Arroyo	23 April 1987 (aged 27)	21	(Mexico) Atlante
16	MF	Antonio Valencia (c)	4 August 1985 (aged 28)	71	(England) Manchester United
17	FW	Jaime Ayoví	21 February 1988 (aged 26)	30	(Mexico) Tijuana
18	DF	Óscar Bagüí	10 December 1982 (aged 31)	21	(Ecuador) Emelec
19	MF	Luis Saritama	20 October 1983 (aged 30)	49	(Ecuador) Barcelona SC
20	MF	Fidel Martínez	15 February 1990 (aged 24)	8	(Mexico) Tijuana
21	DF	Gabriel Achilier	24 March 1985 (aged 29)	23	(Ecuador) Emelec
22	GK	Alexander Domínguez	5 June 1987 (aged 27)	18	(Ecuador) LDU Quito
23	DF	Carlos Gruezo	19 April 1995 (aged 19)	3	(Germany) VfB Stuttgart

=== France ===
Coach: Didier Deschamps

The final squad was announced on 13 May 2014. Though originally selected, Franck Ribéry was removed due to a back injury.

No.	Pos.	Player	Date of birth (age)	Caps	Club
1	GK	Hugo Lloris (c)	26 December 1986 (aged 27)	57	(England) Tottenham Hotspur
2	DF	Mathieu Debuchy	28 July 1985 (aged 28)	21	(England) Newcastle United
3	DF	Patrice Evra	15 May 1981 (aged 33)	58	(England) Manchester United
4	DF	Raphaël Varane	25 April 1993 (aged 21)	6	(Spain) Real Madrid
5	DF	Mamadou Sakho	13 February 1990 (aged 24)	19	(England) Liverpool
6	MF	Yohan Cabaye	14 January 1986 (aged 28)	30	(France) Paris Saint-Germain
7	MF	Rémy Cabella	8 March 1990 (aged 24)	1	(France) Montpellier
8	MF	Mathieu Valbuena	28 September 1984 (aged 29)	34	(France) Marseille
9	FW	Olivier Giroud	30 September 1986 (aged 27)	30	(England) Arsenal
10	FW	Karim Benzema	19 December 1987 (aged 26)	66	(Spain) Real Madrid
11	FW	Antoine Griezmann	21 March 1991 (aged 23)	4	(Spain) Real Sociedad
12	MF	Rio Mavuba	8 March 1984 (aged 30)	12	(France) Lille
13	DF	Eliaquim Mangala	13 February 1991 (aged 23)	3	(Portugal) Porto
14	MF	Blaise Matuidi	9 April 1987 (aged 27)	23	(France) Paris Saint-Germain
15	DF	Bacary Sagna	14 February 1983 (aged 31)	41	(England) Arsenal
16	GK	Stéphane Ruffier	27 September 1986 (aged 27)	2	(France) Saint-Étienne
17	DF	Lucas Digne	20 July 1993 (aged 20)	2	(France) Paris Saint-Germain
18	MF	Moussa Sissoko	16 August 1989 (aged 24)	17	(England) Newcastle United
19	MF	Paul Pogba	15 March 1993 (aged 21)	11	(Italy) Juventus
20	FW	Loïc Rémy	2 January 1987 (aged 27)	25	(England) Newcastle United
21	DF	Laurent Koscielny	10 September 1985 (aged 28)	17	(England) Arsenal
22	MF	Morgan Schneiderlin	8 November 1989 (aged 24)	1	(England) Southampton
23	GK	Mickaël Landreau	14 May 1979 (aged 35)	11	(France) Bastia

=== Honduras ===
Coach: (Colombia) Luis Fernando Suárez

The final squad was announced on 5 May 2014.

No.	Pos.	Player	Date of birth (age)	Caps	Club
1	GK	Luis López	13 September 1993 (aged 20)	0	(Honduras) Real España
2	DF	Osman Chávez	29 July 1984 (aged 29)	54	(China) Qingdao Jonoon
3	DF	Maynor Figueroa	2 May 1983 (aged 31)	105	(England) Hull City
4	DF	Juan Pablo Montes	26 October 1985 (aged 28)	11	(Honduras) Motagua
5	DF	Víctor Bernárdez	24 May 1982 (aged 32)	78	(United States) San Jose Earthquakes
6	DF	Juan Carlos García	8 March 1988 (aged 26)	34	(England) Wigan Athletic
7	DF	Emilio Izaguirre	10 May 1986 (aged 28)	68	(Scotland) Celtic
8	MF	Wilson Palacios	29 July 1984 (aged 29)	95	(England) Stoke City
9	FW	Jerry Palacios	1 November 1981 (aged 32)	24	(Costa Rica) Alajuelense
10	MF	Mario Martínez	30 July 1989 (aged 24)	37	(Honduras) Real España
11	FW	Jerry Bengtson	8 April 1987 (aged 27)	44	(United States) New England Revolution
12	MF	Edder Delgado	20 November 1986 (aged 27)	26	(Honduras) Real España
13	FW	Carlo Costly	18 July 1982 (aged 31)	70	(Honduras) Real España
14	MF	Boniek García	4 September 1984 (aged 29)	92	(United States) Houston Dynamo
15	MF	Roger Espinoza	25 October 1986 (aged 27)	42	(England) Wigan Athletic
16	FW	Rony Martínez	16 October 1987 (aged 26)	12	(Honduras) CD Real Sociedad
17	MF	Andy Najar	16 March 1993 (aged 21)	17	(Belgium) Anderlecht
18	GK	Noel Valladares (c)	3 May 1977 (aged 37)	122	(Honduras) Olimpia
19	MF	Luis Garrido	5 November 1990 (aged 23)	20	(Honduras) Olimpia
20	MF	Jorge Claros	8 January 1986 (aged 28)	49	(Honduras) Motagua
21	DF	Brayan Beckeles	28 November 1985 (aged 28)	23	(Honduras) Olimpia
22	GK	Donis Escober	3 February 1980 (aged 34)	26	(Honduras) Olimpia
23	MF	Marvin Chávez	3 November 1983 (aged 30)	42	(United States) Chivas USA

=== Switzerland ===
Coach: (Germany) Ottmar Hitzfeld

The final squad was announced on 13 May 2014.

No.	Pos.	Player	Date of birth (age)	Caps	Club
1	GK	Diego Benaglio	8 September 1983 (aged 30)	57	(Germany) VfL Wolfsburg
2	DF	Stephan Lichtsteiner	16 January 1984 (aged 30)	63	(Italy) Juventus
3	DF	Reto Ziegler	16 January 1986 (aged 28)	35	(Italy) Sassuolo
4	DF	Philippe Senderos	14 February 1985 (aged 29)	53	(Spain) Valencia
5	DF	Steve von Bergen	10 June 1983 (aged 31)	41	(Switzerland) Young Boys
6	DF	Michael Lang	8 February 1991 (aged 23)	6	(Switzerland) Grasshopper
7	MF	Tranquillo Barnetta	22 May 1985 (aged 29)	74	(Germany) Eintracht Frankfurt
8	MF	Gökhan Inler (c)	27 June 1984 (aged 29)	73	(Italy) Napoli
9	FW	Haris Seferovic	22 February 1992 (aged 22)	11	(Spain) Real Sociedad
10	MF	Granit Xhaka	27 September 1992 (aged 21)	26	(Germany) Borussia Mönchengladbach
11	MF	Valon Behrami	19 April 1985 (aged 29)	48	(Italy) Napoli
12	GK	Yann Sommer	17 December 1988 (aged 25)	6	(Switzerland) Basel
13	DF	Ricardo Rodriguez	25 August 1992 (aged 21)	21	(Germany) VfL Wolfsburg
14	MF	Valentin Stocker	12 April 1989 (aged 25)	24	(Switzerland) Basel
15	MF	Blerim Džemaili	12 April 1986 (aged 28)	34	(Italy) Napoli
16	MF	Gelson Fernandes	2 September 1986 (aged 27)	47	(Germany) SC Freiburg
17	FW	Mario Gavranović	24 November 1989 (aged 24)	11	(Switzerland) Zürich
18	FW	Admir Mehmedi	16 March 1991 (aged 23)	21	(Germany) SC Freiburg
19	FW	Josip Drmić	8 August 1992 (aged 21)	7	(Germany) 1. FC Nürnberg
20	DF	Johan Djourou	18 January 1987 (aged 27)	44	(Germany) Hamburger SV
21	GK	Roman Bürki	14 November 1990 (aged 23)	0	(Switzerland) Grasshopper
22	DF	Fabian Schär	20 December 1991 (aged 22)	6	(Switzerland) Basel
23	MF	Xherdan Shaqiri	10 October 1991 (aged 22)	33	(Germany) Bayern Munich

== Group F ==
=== Argentina ===
Coach: Alejandro Sabella

The final squad was announced on 2 June 2014.

No.	Pos.	Player	Date of birth (age)	Caps	Club
1	GK	Sergio Romero	22 February 1987 (aged 27)	47	(France) Monaco
2	DF	Ezequiel Garay	10 October 1986 (aged 27)	18	(Portugal) Benfica
3	DF	Hugo Campagnaro	27 June 1980 (aged 33)	15	(Italy) Inter Milan
4	DF	Pablo Zabaleta	16 January 1985 (aged 29)	36	(England) Manchester City
5	MF	Fernando Gago	10 April 1986 (aged 28)	49	(Argentina) Boca Juniors
6	MF	Lucas Biglia	30 January 1986 (aged 28)	18	(Italy) Lazio
7	MF	Ángel Di María	14 February 1988 (aged 26)	47	(Spain) Real Madrid
8	MF	Enzo Pérez	22 February 1986 (aged 28)	7	(Portugal) Benfica
9	FW	Gonzalo Higuaín	10 December 1987 (aged 26)	36	(Italy) Napoli
10	FW	Lionel Messi (c)	24 June 1987 (aged 26)	86	(Spain) Barcelona
11	MF	Maxi Rodríguez	2 January 1981 (aged 33)	55	(Argentina) Newell's Old Boys
12	GK	Agustín Orión	26 July 1981 (aged 32)	3	(Argentina) Boca Juniors
13	MF	Augusto Fernández	10 April 1986 (aged 28)	9	(Spain) Celta Vigo
14	MF	Javier Mascherano	8 June 1984 (aged 30)	98	(Spain) Barcelona
15	DF	Martín Demichelis	20 December 1980 (aged 33)	38	(England) Manchester City
16	DF	Marcos Rojo	20 March 1990 (aged 24)	22	(Portugal) Sporting CP
17	DF	Federico Fernández	21 February 1989 (aged 25)	26	(Italy) Napoli
18	FW	Rodrigo Palacio	5 February 1982 (aged 32)	22	(Italy) Inter Milan
19	MF	Ricky Álvarez	12 April 1988 (aged 26)	7	(Italy) Inter Milan
20	FW	Sergio Agüero	2 June 1988 (aged 26)	51	(England) Manchester City
21	GK	Mariano Andújar	30 July 1983 (aged 30)	10	(Italy) Catania
22	FW	Ezequiel Lavezzi	3 May 1985 (aged 29)	31	(France) Paris Saint-Germain
23	DF	José María Basanta	3 April 1984 (aged 30)	10	(Mexico) Monterrey

=== Bosnia and Herzegovina ===
Coach: Safet Sušić

The final squad was announced on 2 June 2014.

No.	Pos.	Player	Date of birth (age)	Caps	Club
1	GK	Asmir Begović	20 June 1987 (aged 26)	30	(England) Stoke City
2	DF	Avdija Vršajević	6 March 1986 (aged 28)	13	(Croatia) Hajduk Split
3	DF	Ermin Bičakčić	24 January 1990 (aged 24)	7	(Germany) Eintracht Braunschweig
4	DF	Emir Spahić (c)	18 August 1980 (aged 33)	74	(Germany) Bayer Leverkusen
5	DF	Sead Kolašinac	20 June 1993 (aged 20)	4	(Germany) Schalke 04
6	DF	Ognjen Vranješ	24 October 1989 (aged 24)	13	(Turkey) Elazığspor
7	DF	Muhamed Bešić	10 September 1992 (aged 21)	9	(Hungary) Ferencváros
8	MF	Miralem Pjanić	2 April 1990 (aged 24)	48	(Italy) Roma
9	FW	Vedad Ibišević	6 August 1984 (aged 29)	55	(Germany) VfB Stuttgart
10	MF	Zvjezdan Misimović	5 June 1982 (aged 32)	81	(China) Guizhou Renhe
11	FW	Edin Džeko	17 March 1986 (aged 28)	62	(England) Manchester City
12	GK	Jasmin Fejzić	15 May 1986 (aged 28)	0	(Germany) VfR Aalen
13	DF	Mensur Mujdža	28 March 1984 (aged 30)	24	(Germany) SC Freiburg
14	MF	Tino-Sven Sušić	13 February 1992 (aged 22)	2	(Croatia) Hajduk Split
15	DF	Toni Šunjić	15 December 1988 (aged 25)	8	(Ukraine) Zorya Luhansk
16	MF	Senad Lulić	18 January 1986 (aged 28)	33	(Italy) Lazio
17	MF	Senijad Ibričić	26 September 1985 (aged 28)	42	(Turkey) Kayseri Erciyesspor
18	MF	Haris Medunjanin	8 March 1985 (aged 29)	35	(Turkey) Gaziantepspor
19	FW	Edin Višća	17 February 1990 (aged 24)	10	(Turkey) İstanbul Başakşehir
20	MF	Izet Hajrović	4 August 1991 (aged 22)	7	(Turkey) Galatasaray
21	MF	Anel Hadžić	16 August 1989 (aged 24)	2	(Austria) Sturm Graz
22	GK	Asmir Avdukić	13 May 1981 (aged 33)	3	(Bosnia and Herzegovina) Borac Banja Luka
23	MF	Sejad Salihović	8 October 1984 (aged 29)	42	(Germany) 1899 Hoffenheim

=== Iran ===
Coach: (Portugal) Carlos Queiroz

The final squad was announced on 1 June 2014.

No.	Pos.	Player	Date of birth (age)	Caps	Club
1	GK	Rahman Ahmadi	30 July 1980 (aged 33)	10	(Iran) Sepahan
2	DF	Khosro Heydari	14 September 1983 (aged 30)	49	(Iran) Esteghlal
3	DF	Ehsan Hajsafi	25 February 1990 (aged 24)	62	(Iran) Sepahan
4	DF	Jalal Hosseini	3 February 1982 (aged 32)	85	(Iran) Persepolis
5	DF	Amir Hossein Sadeghi	6 September 1981 (aged 32)	17	(Iran) Esteghlal
6	MF	Javad Nekounam (c)	7 October 1980 (aged 33)	140	Al-Kuwait
7	FW	Masoud Shojaei	9 June 1984 (aged 30)	50	(Spain) Las Palmas
8	DF	Reza Haghighi	1 February 1989 (aged 25)	8	(Iran) Persepolis
9	FW	Alireza Jahanbakhsh	11 August 1993 (aged 20)	7	(Netherlands) NEC
10	FW	Karim Ansarifard	3 April 1990 (aged 24)	42	(Iran) Tractor Sazi
11	MF	Ghasem Haddadifar	12 July 1983 (aged 30)	17	(Iran) Zob Ahan
12	GK	Alireza Haghighi	2 May 1988 (aged 26)	6	(Portugal) Sporting Covilhã
13	DF	Hossein Mahini	16 September 1986 (aged 27)	22	(Iran) Persepolis
14	MF	Andranik Teymourian	6 March 1983 (aged 31)	79	(Iran) Esteghlal
15	DF	Pejman Montazeri	6 September 1983 (aged 30)	22	(Qatar) Umm Salal
16	FW	Reza Ghoochannejhad	20 September 1987 (aged 26)	14	(England) Charlton Athletic
17	DF	Ahmad Alenemeh	10 October 1982 (aged 31)	9	(Iran) Naft Tehran
18	MF	Bakhtiar Rahmani	23 September 1991 (aged 22)	4	(Iran) Foolad
19	DF	Hashem Beikzadeh	22 January 1984 (aged 30)	17	(Iran) Esteghlal
20	DF	Steven Beitashour	1 February 1987 (aged 27)	6	(Canada) Vancouver Whitecaps FC
21	MF	Ashkan Dejagah	5 July 1986 (aged 27)	14	(England) Fulham
22	GK	Daniel Davari	6 January 1988 (aged 26)	4	(Germany) Eintracht Braunschweig
23	DF	Mehrdad Pooladi	26 February 1987 (aged 27)	20	(Iran) Persepolis

=== Nigeria ===
Coach: Stephen Keshi

The final squad was announced on 2 June 2014. Ejike Uzoenyi replaced Elderson Echiéjilé due to injury on 7 June.

No.	Pos.	Player	Date of birth (age)	Caps	Club
1	GK	Vincent Enyeama	29 August 1982 (aged 31)	91	(France) Lille
2	DF	Joseph Yobo (c)	6 September 1980 (aged 33)	97	(England) Norwich City
3	MF	Ejike Uzoenyi	23 March 1992 (aged 22)	21	(Nigeria) Enugu Rangers
4	MF	Reuben Gabriel	25 September 1990 (aged 23)	11	(Belgium) Waasland-Beveren
5	DF	Efe Ambrose	18 October 1988 (aged 25)	37	(Scotland) Celtic
6	DF	Azubuike Egwuekwe	16 July 1989 (aged 24)	31	(Nigeria) Warri Wolves
7	FW	Ahmed Musa	14 October 1992 (aged 21)	35	(Russia) CSKA Moscow
8	FW	Peter Odemwingie	15 July 1981 (aged 32)	61	(England) Stoke City
9	FW	Emmanuel Emenike	10 May 1987 (aged 27)	23	(Turkey) Fenerbahçe
10	MF	John Obi Mikel	22 April 1987 (aged 27)	59	(England) Chelsea
11	MF	Victor Moses	12 December 1990 (aged 23)	22	(England) Liverpool
12	DF	Kunle Odunlami	30 April 1991 (aged 23)	11	(Nigeria) Sunshine Stars
13	DF	Juwon Oshaniwa	14 September 1990 (aged 23)	10	(Israel) Ashdod
14	DF	Godfrey Oboabona	16 August 1990 (aged 23)	35	(Turkey) Çaykur Rizespor
15	MF	Ramon Azeez	12 December 1992 (aged 21)	2	(Spain) Almería
16	GK	Austin Ejide	8 April 1984 (aged 30)	31	(Israel) Hapoel Be'er Sheva
17	MF	Ogenyi Onazi	25 December 1992 (aged 21)	21	(Italy) Lazio
18	MF	Michael Babatunde	24 December 1992 (aged 21)	5	(Ukraine) Volyn Lutsk
19	FW	Uche Nwofor	17 September 1991 (aged 22)	6	(Netherlands) Heerenveen
20	FW	Michael Uchebo	2 February 1990 (aged 24)	4	(Belgium) Cercle Brugge
21	GK	Chigozie Agbim	28 November 1984 (aged 29)	11	(Nigeria) Gombe United
22	DF	Kenneth Omeruo	17 October 1993 (aged 20)	17	(England) Middlesbrough
23	FW	Shola Ameobi	12 October 1981 (aged 32)	7	(England) Newcastle United

== Group G ==
=== Germany ===
Coach: Joachim Löw

The final squad was announced on 2 June 2014. On 7 June, Marco Reus was replaced by Shkodran Mustafi after Reus injured his ankle.

No.	Pos.	Player	Date of birth (age)	Caps	Club
1	GK	Manuel Neuer	27 March 1986 (aged 28)	52	(Germany) Bayern Munich
2	DF	Kevin Großkreutz	19 July 1988 (aged 25)	5	(Germany) Borussia Dortmund
3	DF	Matthias Ginter	19 January 1994 (aged 20)	2	(Germany) SC Freiburg
4	DF	Benedikt Höwedes	29 February 1988 (aged 26)	21	(Germany) Schalke 04
5	DF	Mats Hummels	16 December 1988 (aged 25)	30	(Germany) Borussia Dortmund
6	MF	Sami Khedira	4 April 1987 (aged 27)	46	(Spain) Real Madrid
7	MF	Bastian Schweinsteiger	1 August 1984 (aged 29)	102	(Germany) Bayern Munich
8	MF	Mesut Özil	15 October 1988 (aged 25)	55	(England) Arsenal
9	FW	André Schürrle	6 November 1990 (aged 23)	33	(England) Chelsea
10	FW	Lukas Podolski	4 June 1985 (aged 29)	114	(England) Arsenal
11	FW	Miroslav Klose	9 June 1978 (aged 36)	132	(Italy) Lazio
12	GK	Ron-Robert Zieler	12 February 1989 (aged 25)	3	(Germany) Hannover 96
13	FW	Thomas Müller	13 September 1989 (aged 24)	49	(Germany) Bayern Munich
14	MF	Julian Draxler	20 September 1993 (aged 20)	11	(Germany) Schalke 04
15	DF	Erik Durm	12 May 1992 (aged 22)	1	(Germany) Borussia Dortmund
16	DF	Philipp Lahm (c)	11 November 1983 (aged 30)	106	(Germany) Bayern Munich
17	DF	Per Mertesacker	29 September 1984 (aged 29)	98	(England) Arsenal
18	MF	Toni Kroos	4 January 1990 (aged 24)	44	(Germany) Bayern Munich
19	MF	Mario Götze	3 June 1992 (aged 22)	29	(Germany) Bayern Munich
20	DF	Jérôme Boateng	3 September 1988 (aged 25)	39	(Germany) Bayern Munich
21	DF	Shkodran Mustafi	17 April 1992 (aged 22)	4	(Italy) Sampdoria
22	GK	Roman Weidenfeller	6 August 1980 (aged 33)	3	(Germany) Borussia Dortmund
23	MF	Christoph Kramer	19 February 1991 (aged 23)	5	(Germany) Borussia Mönchengladbach

=== Ghana ===
Coach: James Kwesi Appiah

The final squad was announced on 1 June 2014. On 26 June 2014, midfielders Sulley Muntari and Kevin-Prince Boateng were sent home and indefinitely suspended from the national team for disciplinary reasons.

No.	Pos.	Player	Date of birth (age)	Caps	Club
1	GK	Stephen Adams	28 September 1989 (aged 24)	7	(Ghana) Aduana Stars
2	DF	Samuel Inkoom	1 June 1989 (aged 25)	46	(Greece) Platanias
3	FW	Asamoah Gyan (c)	22 November 1985 (aged 28)	79	(United Arab Emirates) Al Ain
4	DF	Daniel Opare	18 October 1990 (aged 23)	16	(Belgium) Standard Liège
5	MF	Michael Essien	3 December 1982 (aged 31)	57	(Italy) Milan
6	MF	Afriyie Acquah	5 January 1992 (aged 22)	5	(Italy) Parma
7	MF	Christian Atsu	10 January 1992 (aged 22)	23	(Netherlands) Vitesse
8	MF	Emmanuel Agyemang-Badu	2 December 1990 (aged 23)	49	(Italy) Udinese
9	FW	Kevin-Prince Boateng	6 March 1987 (aged 27)	13	(Germany) Schalke 04
10	MF	André Ayew	17 December 1989 (aged 24)	49	(France) Marseille
11	MF	Sulley Muntari	27 August 1984 (aged 29)	82	(Italy) Milan
12	GK	Adam Larsen Kwarasey	12 December 1987 (aged 26)	21	(Norway) Strømsgodset
13	FW	Jordan Ayew	11 September 1991 (aged 22)	13	(France) Sochaux
14	MF	Albert Adomah	13 December 1987 (aged 26)	15	(England) Middlesbrough
15	DF	Rashid Sumaila	18 December 1992 (aged 21)	6	(South Africa) Mamelodi Sundowns
16	GK	Fatau Dauda	6 April 1985 (aged 29)	18	(South Africa) Orlando Pirates
17	MF	Mohammed Rabiu	31 December 1989 (aged 24)	17	(Russia) Kuban Krasnodar
18	FW	Abdul Majeed Waris	19 September 1991 (aged 22)	13	(France) Valenciennes
19	DF	Jonathan Mensah	13 July 1990 (aged 23)	27	(France) Evian
20	MF	Kwadwo Asamoah	9 December 1988 (aged 25)	62	(Italy) Juventus
21	DF	John Boye	23 April 1987 (aged 27)	30	(France) Rennes
22	MF	Mubarak Wakaso	25 July 1990 (aged 23)	17	(Russia) Rubin Kazan
23	DF	Harrison Afful	24 June 1986 (aged 27)	41	(Tunisia) Espérance de Tunis

=== Portugal ===
Coach: Paulo Bento

The final squad was announced on 19 May 2014. The squad numbers were revealed on 24 May.

No.	Pos.	Player	Date of birth (age)	Caps	Club
1	GK	Eduardo	19 September 1982 (aged 31)	34	(Portugal) Braga
2	DF	Bruno Alves	27 November 1981 (aged 32)	72	(Turkey) Fenerbahçe
3	DF	Pepe	26 February 1983 (aged 31)	58	(Spain) Real Madrid
4	MF	Miguel Veloso	11 May 1986 (aged 28)	49	(Ukraine) Dynamo Kyiv
5	DF	Fábio Coentrão	11 March 1988 (aged 26)	45	(Spain) Real Madrid
6	MF	William Carvalho	7 April 1992 (aged 22)	4	(Portugal) Sporting CP
7	FW	Cristiano Ronaldo (c)	5 February 1985 (aged 29)	111	(Spain) Real Madrid
8	MF	João Moutinho	8 September 1986 (aged 27)	68	(France) Monaco
9	FW	Hugo Almeida	23 May 1984 (aged 30)	55	(Turkey) Beşiktaş
10	MF	Vieirinha	24 January 1986 (aged 28)	9	(Germany) VfL Wolfsburg
11	FW	Eder	22 December 1987 (aged 26)	8	(Portugal) Braga
12	GK	Rui Patrício	15 February 1988 (aged 26)	30	(Portugal) Sporting CP
13	DF	Ricardo Costa	16 May 1981 (aged 33)	19	(Spain) Valencia
14	DF	Luís Neto	26 May 1988 (aged 26)	9	(Russia) Zenit Saint Petersburg
15	MF	Rafa Silva	17 May 1993 (aged 21)	3	(Portugal) Braga
16	MF	Raul Meireles	17 March 1983 (aged 31)	74	(Turkey) Fenerbahçe
17	MF	Nani	17 November 1986 (aged 27)	75	(England) Manchester United
18	MF	Silvestre Varela	2 February 1985 (aged 29)	24	(Portugal) Porto
19	DF	André Almeida	10 September 1990 (aged 23)	5	(Portugal) Benfica
20	MF	Ruben Amorim	27 January 1985 (aged 29)	13	(Portugal) Benfica
21	DF	João Pereira	25 February 1984 (aged 30)	36	(Spain) Valencia
22	GK	Beto	1 May 1982 (aged 32)	7	(Spain) Sevilla
23	FW	Hélder Postiga	2 August 1982 (aged 31)	69	(Italy) Lazio

=== United States ===
Coach: (Germany) Jürgen Klinsmann

The final squad was announced on 22 May 2014.

No.	Pos.	Player	Date of birth (age)	Caps	Club
1	GK	Tim Howard	6 March 1979 (aged 35)	100	(England) Everton
2	DF	DeAndre Yedlin	9 July 1993 (aged 20)	4	(United States) Seattle Sounders FC
3	DF	Omar Gonzalez	11 October 1988 (aged 25)	20	(United States) LA Galaxy
4	MF	Michael Bradley	31 July 1987 (aged 26)	86	(Canada) Toronto FC
5	DF	Matt Besler	11 February 1987 (aged 27)	17	(United States) Sporting Kansas City
6	DF	John Brooks	28 January 1993 (aged 21)	4	(Germany) Hertha BSC
7	DF	DaMarcus Beasley	24 May 1982 (aged 32)	116	(Mexico) Puebla
8	FW	Clint Dempsey (c)	9 March 1983 (aged 31)	105	(United States) Seattle Sounders FC
9	FW	Aron Jóhannsson	10 November 1990 (aged 23)	8	(Netherlands) AZ
10	MF	Mix Diskerud	2 October 1990 (aged 23)	20	(Norway) Rosenborg
11	MF	Alejandro Bedoya	29 April 1987 (aged 27)	28	(France) Nantes
12	GK	Brad Guzan	9 September 1984 (aged 29)	25	(England) Aston Villa
13	MF	Jermaine Jones	3 November 1981 (aged 32)	42	(Turkey) Beşiktaş
14	MF	Brad Davis	8 November 1981 (aged 32)	16	(United States) Houston Dynamo
15	MF	Kyle Beckerman	23 April 1982 (aged 32)	37	(United States) Real Salt Lake
16	MF	Julian Green	6 June 1995 (aged 19)	2	(Germany) Bayern Munich
17	FW	Jozy Altidore	6 November 1989 (aged 24)	70	(England) Sunderland
18	FW	Chris Wondolowski	28 January 1983 (aged 31)	21	(United States) San Jose Earthquakes
19	MF	Graham Zusi	18 August 1986 (aged 27)	23	(United States) Sporting Kansas City
20	DF	Geoff Cameron	11 July 1985 (aged 28)	27	(England) Stoke City
21	DF	Timothy Chandler	29 March 1990 (aged 24)	13	(Germany) 1. FC Nürnberg
22	GK	Nick Rimando	17 June 1979 (aged 34)	14	(United States) Real Salt Lake
23	DF	Fabian Johnson	11 December 1987 (aged 26)	22	(Germany) 1899 Hoffenheim

== Group H ==
=== Algeria ===
Coach: (Bosnia and Herzegovina) Vahid Halilhodžić

The final squad was announced on 2 June 2014.

No.	Pos.	Player	Date of birth (age)	Caps	Club
1	GK	Cédric Si Mohamed	9 January 1985 (aged 29)	1	(Algeria) CS Constantine
2	DF	Madjid Bougherra (c)	7 October 1982 (aged 31)	62	(Qatar) Lekhwiya
3	DF	Faouzi Ghoulam	1 February 1991 (aged 23)	6	(Italy) Napoli
4	DF	Essaïd Belkalem	1 January 1989 (aged 25)	13	(England) Watford
5	DF	Rafik Halliche	2 September 1986 (aged 27)	29	(Portugal) Académica de Coimbra
6	DF	Djamel Mesbah	9 October 1984 (aged 29)	26	(Italy) Livorno
7	MF	Hassan Yebda	14 May 1984 (aged 30)	25	(Italy) Udinese
8	MF	Mehdi Lacen	15 May 1984 (aged 30)	30	(Spain) Getafe
9	FW	Nabil Ghilas	20 April 1990 (aged 24)	5	(Portugal) Porto
10	MF	Sofiane Feghouli	26 December 1989 (aged 24)	19	(Spain) Valencia
11	MF	Yacine Brahimi	8 February 1990 (aged 24)	6	(Spain) Granada
12	DF	Carl Medjani	15 May 1985 (aged 29)	26	(France) Valenciennes
13	FW	Islam Slimani	18 June 1988 (aged 25)	20	(Portugal) Sporting CP
14	MF	Nabil Bentaleb	24 November 1994 (aged 19)	3	(England) Tottenham Hotspur
15	FW	Hillal Soudani	25 November 1987 (aged 26)	22	(Croatia) Dinamo Zagreb
16	GK	Mohamed Lamine Zemmamouche	19 March 1985 (aged 29)	7	(Algeria) USM Alger
17	DF	Liassine Cadamuro-Bentaïba	5 March 1988 (aged 26)	7	(Spain) Mallorca
18	MF	Abdelmoumene Djabou	31 January 1987 (aged 27)	8	(Tunisia) Club Africain
19	MF	Saphir Taïder	29 February 1992 (aged 22)	11	(Italy) Inter Milan
20	DF	Aïssa Mandi	22 October 1991 (aged 22)	2	(France) Reims
21	MF	Riyad Mahrez	21 February 1991 (aged 23)	2	(England) Leicester City
22	MF	Mehdi Mostefa	30 August 1983 (aged 30)	23	(France) Ajaccio
23	GK	Raïs M'Bolhi	25 April 1986 (aged 28)	28	(Bulgaria) CSKA Sofia

=== Belgium ===
Coach: Marc Wilmots

The final squad was announced on 2 June 2014. However, a medical test on 3 June showed goalkeeper Koen Casteels had not completely recovered from his tibia injury and he was replaced by Sammy Bossut.

No.	Pos.	Player	Date of birth (age)	Caps	Club
1	GK	Thibaut Courtois	11 May 1992 (aged 22)	17	(Spain) Atlético Madrid
2	DF	Toby Alderweireld	2 March 1989 (aged 25)	34	(Spain) Atlético Madrid
3	DF	Thomas Vermaelen	14 November 1985 (aged 28)	47	(England) Arsenal
4	DF	Vincent Kompany (c)	10 April 1986 (aged 28)	59	(England) Manchester City
5	DF	Jan Vertonghen	24 April 1987 (aged 27)	56	(England) Tottenham Hotspur
6	MF	Axel Witsel	12 January 1989 (aged 25)	48	(Russia) Zenit Saint Petersburg
7	MF	Kevin De Bruyne	28 June 1991 (aged 22)	21	(Germany) VfL Wolfsburg
8	MF	Marouane Fellaini	22 November 1987 (aged 26)	50	(England) Manchester United
9	FW	Romelu Lukaku	13 May 1993 (aged 21)	29	(England) Everton
10	MF	Eden Hazard	7 January 1991 (aged 23)	45	(England) Chelsea
11	MF	Kevin Mirallas	5 October 1987 (aged 26)	44	(England) Everton
12	GK	Simon Mignolet	6 August 1988 (aged 25)	14	(England) Liverpool
13	GK	Sammy Bossut	11 August 1985 (aged 28)	0	(Belgium) Zulte Waregem
14	FW	Dries Mertens	6 May 1987 (aged 27)	25	(Italy) Napoli
15	DF	Daniel Van Buyten	7 February 1978 (aged 36)	79	(Germany) Bayern Munich
16	MF	Steven Defour	15 April 1988 (aged 26)	43	(Portugal) Porto
17	FW	Divock Origi	18 April 1995 (aged 19)	2	(France) Lille
18	DF	Nicolas Lombaerts	20 March 1985 (aged 29)	25	(Russia) Zenit Saint Petersburg
19	MF	Mousa Dembélé	16 July 1987 (aged 26)	57	(England) Tottenham Hotspur
20	MF	Adnan Januzaj	5 February 1995 (aged 19)	1	(England) Manchester United
21	DF	Anthony Vanden Borre	24 October 1987 (aged 26)	25	(Belgium) Anderlecht
22	MF	Nacer Chadli	2 October 1989 (aged 24)	20	(England) Tottenham Hotspur
23	DF	Laurent Ciman	5 August 1985 (aged 28)	8	(Belgium) Standard Liège

=== Russia ===
Coach: (Italy) Fabio Capello

The final squad was announced on 2 June 2014. However, midfielder Roman Shirokov was later removed from the squad due to a long-standing Achilles tendon injury and replaced by Pavel Mogilevets.

No.	Pos.	Player	Date of birth (age)	Caps	Club
1	GK	Igor Akinfeev	8 April 1986 (aged 28)	68	(Russia) CSKA Moscow
2	DF	Aleksei Kozlov	16 November 1986 (aged 27)	11	(Russia) Dynamo Moscow
3	DF	Georgi Shchennikov	27 April 1991 (aged 23)	4	(Russia) CSKA Moscow
4	DF	Sergei Ignashevich	14 July 1979 (aged 34)	96	(Russia) CSKA Moscow
5	DF	Andrei Semyonov	24 March 1989 (aged 25)	1	(Russia) Terek Grozny
6	FW	Maksim Kanunnikov	14 July 1991 (aged 22)	2	(Russia) Amkar Perm
7	MF	Igor Denisov	17 May 1984 (aged 30)	43	(Russia) Dynamo Moscow
8	MF	Denis Glushakov	27 January 1987 (aged 27)	26	(Russia) Spartak Moscow
9	FW	Aleksandr Kokorin	19 March 1991 (aged 23)	21	(Russia) Dynamo Moscow
10	MF	Alan Dzagoev	17 June 1990 (aged 23)	32	(Russia) CSKA Moscow
11	FW	Aleksandr Kerzhakov	27 November 1982 (aged 31)	80	(Russia) Zenit Saint Petersburg
12	GK	Yuri Lodygin	26 May 1990 (aged 24)	3	(Russia) Zenit Saint Petersburg
13	DF	Vladimir Granat	22 May 1987 (aged 27)	5	(Russia) Dynamo Moscow
14	DF	Vasili Berezutski (c)	20 June 1982 (aged 31)	78	(Russia) CSKA Moscow
15	MF	Pavel Mogilevets	25 January 1993 (aged 21)	1	(Russia) Rubin Kazan
16	GK	Sergey Ryzhikov	19 September 1980 (aged 33)	1	(Russia) Rubin Kazan
17	MF	Oleg Shatov	29 July 1990 (aged 23)	7	(Russia) Zenit Saint Petersburg
18	DF	Yuri Zhirkov	20 August 1983 (aged 30)	60	(Russia) Dynamo Moscow
19	FW	Aleksandr Samedov	19 July 1984 (aged 29)	17	(Russia) Lokomotiv Moscow
20	MF	Viktor Fayzulin	22 April 1986 (aged 28)	19	(Russia) Zenit Saint Petersburg
21	FW	Aleksei Ionov	18 February 1989 (aged 25)	5	(Russia) Dynamo Moscow
22	DF	Andrey Yeshchenko	9 February 1984 (aged 30)	12	(Russia) Anzhi Makhachkala
23	DF	Dmitri Kombarov	22 January 1987 (aged 27)	22	(Russia) Spartak Moscow

Note: a 2012 friendly match against Lithuania, recognized by the Russian Football Union but not by FIFA, is not counted.

=== South Korea ===
Coach: Hong Myung-bo

The final squad was announced on 8 May 2014.

No.	Pos.	Player	Date of birth (age)	Caps	Club
1	GK	Jung Sung-ryong	4 January 1985 (aged 29)	61	(South Korea) Suwon Samsung Bluewings
2	DF	Kim Chang-soo	12 September 1985 (aged 28)	9	(Japan) Kashiwa Reysol
3	DF	Yun Suk-young	13 February 1990 (aged 24)	4	(England) Queens Park Rangers
4	DF	Kwak Tae-hwi	8 July 1981 (aged 32)	35	(Saudi Arabia) Al Hilal
5	DF	Kim Young-gwon	27 February 1990 (aged 24)	21	(China) Guangzhou Evergrande
6	DF	Hwang Seok-ho	27 June 1989 (aged 24)	3	(Japan) Sanfrecce Hiroshima
7	MF	Kim Bo-kyung	6 October 1989 (aged 24)	28	(Wales) Cardiff City
8	MF	Ha Dae-sung	2 March 1985 (aged 29)	13	(China) Beijing Guoan
9	FW	Son Heung-min	8 July 1992 (aged 21)	25	(Germany) Bayer Leverkusen
10	FW	Park Chu-young	10 July 1985 (aged 28)	64	(England) Watford
11	FW	Lee Keun-ho	11 April 1985 (aged 29)	63	(South Korea) Sangju Sangmu
12	DF	Lee Yong	24 December 1986 (aged 27)	12	(South Korea) Ulsan Hyundai
13	MF	Koo Ja-cheol (c)	27 February 1989 (aged 25)	37	(Germany) Mainz 05
14	MF	Han Kook-young	19 April 1990 (aged 24)	10	(Japan) Kashiwa Reysol
15	MF	Park Jong-woo	10 March 1989 (aged 25)	10	(China) Guangzhou R&F
16	MF	Ki Sung-yueng	24 January 1989 (aged 25)	58	(England) Sunderland
17	MF	Lee Chung-yong	2 July 1988 (aged 25)	55	(England) Bolton Wanderers
18	FW	Kim Shin-wook	14 April 1988 (aged 26)	27	(South Korea) Ulsan Hyundai
19	FW	Ji Dong-won	28 May 1991 (aged 23)	28	(Germany) FC Augsburg
20	DF	Hong Jeong-ho	12 August 1989 (aged 24)	25	(Germany) FC Augsburg
21	GK	Kim Seung-gyu	30 September 1990 (aged 23)	5	(South Korea) Ulsan Hyundai
22	DF	Park Joo-ho	16 January 1987 (aged 27)	14	(Germany) Mainz 05
23	GK	Lee Bum-young	2 April 1989 (aged 25)	0	(South Korea) Busan IPark

== Statistics ==
=== Player representation by age ===
==== Players ====
- Oldest: (Colombia) Faryd Mondragón (43 years, 3 days)
- Youngest: (Cameroon) Fabrice Olinga (18 years, 31 days)

==== Goalkeepers ====
- Oldest: (Colombia) Faryd Mondragón (43 years, 3 days)
- Youngest: (Greece) Stefanos Kapino (20 years, 86 days)

==== Captains ====
- Oldest: (Colombia) Mario Yepes (38 years, 150 days)
- Youngest: (South Korea) Koo Ja-cheol (25 years, 105 days)

=== Player representation by league system ===
League systems with twenty or more players represented are listed. England included two Premier League clubs based in Wales, Swansea City and Cardiff City (five World Cup squad members played for these clubs); the United States included three MLS clubs based in Canada, Toronto FC, Vancouver Whitecaps FC and Montreal Impact (three World Cup squad members played for these clubs); and France included one Ligue 1 club based in Monaco, AS Monaco (four World Cup squad members played for this club). In all, World Cup squad members played for clubs in 54 countries, and played in 51 different national leagues.

Country	Players	Outside national squad
England	119	97
Italy	81	61
Germany	78	61
Spain	64	50
France	46	38
Russia	34	11
Turkey	26	26
Mexico	26	11
Portugal	23	15
United States	21	12
Netherlands	20	10

The Russian squad was made up entirely of players from the country's domestic league. England's squad had only one player employed by a non-domestic club: Fraser Forster was employed in Scotland; although it was also part of the United Kingdom, they had a separate national federation and league system from England. The Belgian squad had the most players from a single foreign federation, with twelve players employed in England, although one of these, Thibaut Courtois, was only on loan to English club Chelsea prior to the tournament. Of the countries not represented by a national team at the World Cup, Turkey's league provided the most squad members.

Only Uruguay's squad was made up entirely of players employed by overseas clubs, although one player on that squad, Sebastián Coates, played for a domestic club immediately before the World Cup, doing so while on loan from English club Liverpool. Three squads had only one domestic-based player (Ivory Coast, Bosnia and Herzegovina and Ghana).

=== Player representation by club ===
Clubs with ten or more players represented are listed.

Club	Players
(Germany) Bayern Munich	14
(England) Manchester United	14
(Spain) Barcelona	13
(England) Chelsea	12
(Italy) Juventus	12
(Italy) Napoli	12
(Spain) Real Madrid	12
(England) Arsenal	10
(England) Liverpool	10
(England) Manchester City	10
(France) Paris Saint-Germain	10

=== Coaches representation by country ===
Coaches in bold represented their own country.

Number	Country	Coaches
4	Germany	Volker Finke (Cameroon), Ottmar Hitzfeld (Switzerland), Jürgen Klinsmann (United States), **Joachim Löw**
3	Argentina	José Pékerman (Colombia), **Alejandro Sabella**, Jorge Sampaoli (Chile)
3	Colombia	Jorge Luis Pinto (Costa Rica), Reinaldo Rueda (Ecuador), Luis Fernando Suárez (Honduras)
3	Italy	Fabio Capello (Russia), **Cesare Prandelli**, Alberto Zaccheroni (Japan)
3	Portugal	**Paulo Bento**, Carlos Queiroz (Iran), Fernando Santos (Greece)
2	Bosnia and Herzegovina	Vahid Halilhodžić (Algeria), **Safet Sušić**
2	France	**Didier Deschamps**, Sabri Lamouchi (Ivory Coast)
1	Australia	**Ange Postecoglou**
1	Belgium	**Marc Wilmots**
1	Brazil	**Luiz Felipe Scolari**
1	Croatia	**Niko Kovač**
1	England	**Roy Hodgson**
1	Ghana	**James Kwesi Appiah**
1	Mexico	**Miguel Herrera**
1	Netherlands	**Louis van Gaal**
1	Nigeria	**Stephen Keshi**
1	South Korea	**Hong Myung-bo**
1	Spain	**Vicente del Bosque**
1	Uruguay	**Óscar Tabárez**

== See also ==
- 2010 FIFA World Cup squads
