= 2009 African Youth Championship =

CAF U20/Rwanda 2009 Coupe d'Afrique des nations junior 2009 Igikombe cya Afurika cy'abato bato 2009 Kombe la Mataifa ya Jumuiya ya Afrika 2009

Tournament details
- Host country: Rwanda
- City: Kigali City
- Dates: 18 January – 1 February
- Teams: 8 (from 1 confederation)
- Venue(s): Amahoro Stadium, Nyamirambo Stadium (in 1 host city)

Final positions
- Champions: Ghana (3rd title)
- Runners-up: Cameroon
- Third place: Nigeria
- Fourth place: South Africa

Tournament statistics
- Matches played: 16
- Goals scored: 43 (2.69 per match)
- Top scorer: (Ghana) Ransford Osei (7 goals)

The 2009 African Youth Championship is a football tournament for under 20 players. It was held in Rwanda from 18 January until 1 February 2009. It also served as qualification for the 2009 FIFA U-20 World Cup.

== Qualification ==
=== Preliminary round ===
The first leg was played on either the 18, 19 or 20 April 2008. The second leg was held on either the 2, 3 or 4 May 2008. The winners advanced to the First Round.

Congo, Nigeria, Zambia, Gambia, Côte d'Ivoire, Egypt, Cameroon, Benin, Morocco, Tunisia, Mali, Ghana, Angola, Gabon, South Africa and Burkina Faso all received byes to the First Round.

Team 1	Agg.	Team 2	1st leg	2nd leg
Mauritania	1–0	Algeria	1–0	0–0
Sierra Leone	1–3	Senegal	1–1	0–2
Somalia	3 – 3 (3–5 PSO)	Kenya	2–1	1–2
Tanzania	w/o	Sudan	w/o	w/o
Lesotho	1–2	Zimbabwe	1–0	0–2
Madagascar	w/o	Mauritius	w/o	w/o
Malawi	2 – 2 (3–4 AGR)	Burundi	1–2	1–0
DR Congo (Democratic Republic of the Congo)	1–0	Uganda	0–0	1–0
Namibia	1–2	Botswana	1–1	0–1
Réunion	4–3	Mozambique	2–2	2–1
Guinea	4–2	Liberia	3–2	1–0
Niger	2 – 2 (4–3 PSO)	Libya	2–0	0–2

=== First round ===
The First Round first leg matches were held on the 27, 28 and 29 June 2008. The second legs were held on the 11, 12 and 13 July 2008. The winners qualified for the Second Round.

Team 1	Agg.	Team 2	1st leg	2nd leg
Benin	6–3	Morocco	3–0	3–3
Tunisia	0–2	Mali	0–1	0–1
Ghana	5–2	Angola	5–1	0–1
Gambia (The Gambia)	4–1	Mauritania	1–0	3–1
Nigeria	3–0	Senegal	2–0	1–0
Kenya	1 – 1(2–4 PSO)	Sudan	1–0	0–1
Egypt	6–0	Zimbabwe	5–0	1–0
Zambia	3–0	Mauritius	1–0	2–0
Cameroon	2–0	Burundi	1–0	1–0
Republic of the Congo	3–1	(Democratic Republic of the Congo) DR Congo	1–1	2–0
Gabon	0–2	Botswana	0–2	0–0
South Africa	8–2	Réunion	1–1	7–1
Côte d'Ivoire (Ivory Coast)	3–2	Guinea	1–1	2–1
Burkina Faso	6–0	Niger	3–0	3–0

=== Second round ===
The first legs were played on the 26, 27 and 28 September. The second legs were played on the 11, 12 and 13 October. The winners qualified for the Finals.

Team 1	Agg.	Team 2	1st leg	2nd leg
Benin	0–2	Mali	0–2	0–0
Ghana	3–1	(The Gambia) Gambia	2–1	1–0
Nigeria	7–2	Sudan	5–0	2–2
Egypt	4–3	Zambia	3–3	1–0
Cameroon	2–0	Republic of the Congo	0–0	2–0
Botswana	0–3	South Africa	0–0	0–3
Côte d'Ivoire (Ivory Coast)	5–2	Burkina Faso	1–0	4–2

== Squads ==
The following teams entered the tournament:

- Cameroon
- Ivory Coast
- Egypt
- Ghana
- Mali
- Nigeria
- Rwanda (host)
- South Africa

== Group stage ==
=== Group A ===
Pos	Team	Pld	W	D	L	GF	GA	GD	Pts	Qualification
1	Ghana	3	2	1	0	5	1	+4	7	Advance to knockout stage
2	Cameroon	3	1	2	0	5	2	+3	5	Advance to knockout stage
3	Rwanda (H)	3	1	1	1	3	4	−1	4	
4	Mali	3	0	0	3	1	7	−6	0	

Rules for classification: Group tiebreakers
(H) Hosts
18 January 2009
15:00

Rwanda	2–1	Mali
Mugiraneza 6'; Uzamukunda 61'; Ngaboyisibo (yellow card) 34'; Kwizera (yellow card) 57'; Ngoma (yellow card) 90+4'	Report	Sow 29'

Stade Amahoro, Kigali
Referee: Bennett (South Africa)

18 January 2009
17:30

Ghana	1–1	Cameroon
Ayew 37'	Report	Zoua 1'

Stade Amahoro, Kigali
Referee: Kaoma (Zambia)

21 January 2009
14:00

Mali	0–2	Ghana
	Report	Awako 17'; Osei 78'

Stade Amahoro, Kigali
Referee: Ragab (Libya)

21 January 2009
16:45

Cameroon	1–1	Rwanda
Owana 35'	Report	Y. Ndayishimiye 44'

Stade Amahoro, Kigali
Referee: Yakhouba Keita (Guinea)

24 January 2009
15:30

Rwanda	0–2	Ghana
	Report	Osei 68', 80'

Stade Amahoro, Kigali
Referee: Fall (Senegal)

24 January 2009
15:30

Mali	0–3	Cameroon
	Report	Zoua 20'; Ekeng 25'; Owana 44'

Stade Régional Nyamirambo, Kigali
Referee: Abdel Gadir (Sudan)

=== Group B ===
Pos	Team	Pld	W	D	L	GF	GA	GD	Pts	Qualification
1	Nigeria	3	2	0	1	6	2	+4	6 (Note: Tied on head-to-head points. Overall goal difference: Nigeria +4, South Africa +1, Egypt 0.)	Advance to knockout stage
2	South Africa	3	2	0	1	4	3	+1	6	Advance to knockout stage
3	Egypt	3	2	0	1	4	4	0	6	
4	Ivory Coast	3	0	0	3	1	6	−5	0	

Rules for classification: Group tiebreakers
Notes:
19 January 2009
13:00

Nigeria	2–0	Egypt
Udoh 36'; Alfa 55'

Stade Régional Nyamirambo, Kigali
Referee: Gasingwa (Rwanda)

19 January 2009
15:30

Ivory Coast	0–1	South Africa
	Report	Nyanda 1H'

Stade Régional Nyamirambo, Kigali
Referee: Abdel Gadir (Sudan)

22 January 2009
13:00

Egypt	2–1	Ivory Coast
Bogy 62'; Hegazy 89'	Report	Koné 29'

Stade Régional Nyamirambo, Kigali
Referee: Kaoma (Zambia)

22 January 2009
15:30

South Africa	2–1	Nigeria
Bhengu 75' (pen.); Maluleka 82'	Report	Uchebo 72'

Stade Régional Nyamirambo, Kigali
Referee: Fall (Senegal)

25 January 2009
15:30

Nigeria	3–0	Ivory Coast
Chrisantus 27'; Lukman 80'; Ibrahim 82'	Report

Stade Amahoro, Kigali
Referee: Ragab (Libya)

25 January 2009
15:30

Egypt	2–1	South Africa
Talaat 27', 39'	Report	Ngcepe 71'

Stade Régional Nyamirambo, Kigali
Referee: Yakhouba Keita (Guinea)

== Knockout stage ==
Semi-finals
28 January – Kigali
Ghana	4
South Africa	3
28 January – Kigali
Nigeria	0
Cameroon	2

Final
1 February – Kigali
Ghana	2
Cameroon	0
Third place
31 January – Kigali
Nigeria	2
South Africa	1

=== Semi-finals ===
28 January 2009

Nigeria	0–2	Cameroon
Oseni (yellow card) 87'	Report	Zoua 31'; Tiko 66'

Stade Amahoro, Kigali
Referee: Kaoma (Zambia)

28 January 2009

South Africa	3–4	Ghana
Bhengu 63', 87' (pen.); Serero 72'	Report	Adiyiah 26'; Osei 45+2', 71'; Ayew 64'

Stade Amahoro, Kigali
Referee: Abdel Gadir (Sudan)

=== 3rd Place ===
31 January 2009

South Africa	1–2	Nigeria
Maluleka 8'	Report	Ibrahim 15'; Temile 45'

Stade Régional Nyamirambo, Kigali
Referee: Ragab (Libya)

=== Final ===
1 February 2009

Cameroon	0–2	Ghana
		Osei 22', 86'

Stade Amahoro, Kigali

== Winner ==
2009 African Youth Championship winner

Ghana
Third title

== Qualification to FIFA U-20 World Cup ==
The four best performing teams qualified for the 2009 FIFA U-20 World Cup.

- Cameroon
- Ghana
- Nigeria
- South Africa

== Goal scorers ==
7 goals

- (Ghana) Ransford Osei

3 goals

- (Cameroon) Jacques Zoua Daogari
- (South Africa) Phumelele Bhengu

2 goals

- (Cameroon) Brice Owana
- (Egypt) Talaat
- (Ghana) André Ayew
- (Nigeria) Rabiu Ibrahim

1 goal

- (Cameroon) Patrick Ekeng Ekeng
- (Cameroon) Germain Francelin Tiko Messina
- (Egypt) Ahmed Fathi Mohamed Mahmoud Mohamed
- (Egypt) Ahmed Hegazy
- (Ghana) Gladson Awako
- (Ghana) Dominic Adiyiah
- (Ivory Coast) Koro Issa Koné
- (Mali) Samba Sow

1 goal (cont)

- (Nigeria) Kingsley Udoh
- (Nigeria) Yakubu Alfa
- (Nigeria) Michael Okechukwu Uchebo
- (Nigeria) Macauley Chrisantus
- (Nigeria) Haruna Lukman
- (Nigeria) Frank Temile
- (Rwanda) Jean Mugiraneza
- (Rwanda) Elias Uzamukunda
- (Rwanda) Yussuf Ndayishimiye
- (South Africa) Mduduzi Nyanda
- (South Africa) Thulani Serero
- (South Africa) Thabang Matuka
- (South Africa) Thulane Ngcepe
- (South Africa) George Maluleka
