= Phumelele =

Phumelele is a masculine given name. Notable people with the name include:

- Phumelele Bhengu (born 1989), South African footballer
- Phumelele Stone Sizani (born 1954), South African politician

While "Phumelele" can be viewed as a masculine name on the basis that there are a few male public figures with that name, many women in South Africa share that name. In direct translation "Phumelele" simply means to "succeed".

== See also ==
- Phumelela Mbande (born 1993), South African field hockey player
