= Elias Uzamukunda =

Rwandan professional footballer (born 1991)

Personal information
- Date of birth: 15 May 1991 (age 35)
- Place of birth: Kigali, Rwanda
- Height: 1.80 m (5 ft 11 in)
- Position: Forward

Youth career
- 2006–2007: AS Kigali
- 2007–2010: A.P.R.

Senior career*
Years	Team	Apps	(Gls)
2010–2014	Cannes	81	(20)
2014–2015	Andrézieux-Bouthéon FC	14	(2)
2015–2016	Le Mans	23	(2)
2016–2017	Avoine OCC	12	(1)
Total		130	(25)

International career
2009–2010	Rwanda U20		
2006–2016	Rwanda	16	(4)
- * Club domestic league appearances and goals

Elias Uzamukunda (born 15 May 1991) is a Rwandan former professional footballer who played as a forward. In his home country of Rwanda, he is known as "Baby".

== Club career ==
=== Early career ===
Uzamukunda was born in Kigali, Rwanda. He became known for his performance at the 2009 African Youth Championship, which led to interest from French professional club Nantes. Uzamukunda joined the club on a trial basis and played on the club's reserve team, however, he was not signed. Prior to that, he played for AS Kigali and A.P.R. in his home country. In January 2010, he trialled with French third-tier club Cannes and was subsequently signed the same month.

=== Cannes ===
Uzamukunda made his debut for Cannes on 7 May 2010 in a league match against Troyes appearing as a substitute in a 0–0 defeat. The following season, he scored his first goal for the club on 9 November against Créteil after appearing as a substitute 15 minutes prior. As a result of his goal, Cannes won the match 1–0.

== International career ==
Uzamukunda previously played for Rwanda U20 national team, participating at the 2009 African Youth Championship. The competition was played on home soil as Rwanda failed to progress out of the group stage. Uzamukunda scored his only goal in the competition in the team's opening 2–1 win over Mali.

Uzamukunda made his full international in debut with the Rwanda senior national team in 2006 and scored his first senior goal in the 2–1 quarter-final win over Tanzania at the 2006 CECAFA Cup. In 2008, the young striker appeared on the bench in several qualification matches with the senior team for the 2010 FIFA World Cup under manager Branko Tucak, but failed to make any appearances. Uzamukunda failed to make any appearances with the team in 2010, despite being called up for several matches.

== Career statistics ==
Scores and results list Rwanda's goal tally first, score column indicates score after each Uzamukunda goal.

List of international goals scored by Elias Uzamukunda
No.	Date	Venue	Opponent	Score	Result	Competition
1	13 December 2007	National Stadium, Dar es Salaam, Tanzania	Djibouti	5–0	9–0	2007 CECAFA Cup
2	26 March 2011	Stade Régional Nyamirambo, Kigali, Rwanda	Burundi	2–1	3–1	2012 Africa Cup of Nations qualification
3	11 November 2011	Cicero Stadium, Asmara, Eritrea	Eritrea	1–1	1–1	2014 FIFA World Cup qualification
4	14 November 2012	Amahoro Stadium, Kigali, Rwanda	Namibia	2–0	2–2	Friendly
