= Ransford Osei =

Ghanaian footballer (born 1990)

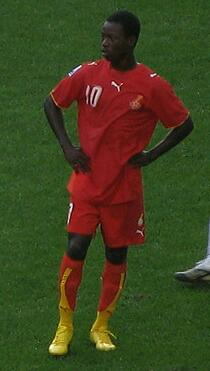
- Ransford Osei playing for the Ghana U-17

Personal information
- Date of birth: 5 December 1990 (age 35)
- Place of birth: Kumasi, Ashanti, Ghana
- Height: 1.81 m (5 ft 11 in)
- Position: Striker

Youth career
- Adelaide

Senior career*
Years	Team	Apps	(Gls)
2005–2008	Kessben	30	(3)
2008–2011	Maccabi Haifa	11	(2)
2008	→ Berekum Chelsea (loan)		
2009–2010	→ FC Twente (loan)	0	(0)
2010–2011	→ Granada B (loan)		
2012	Bloemfontein Celtic	4	(1)
2012–13	Asante Kotoko	19	(3)
2015	Polokwane City	3	(0)
2016	RoPS	16	(1)
2016	→ Santa Claus (loan)	2	(0)
2018–2019	Palanga	3	(0)

International career^{‡}
2007	Ghana U17	7	(6)
2009	Ghana U20	7	(4)
2010	Ghana	2	(0)
Medal record
Professionalism in association football
Maccabi Haifa
Winner	Israeli Premier League	2009
Runner-up	Israel State Cup	2009
Asante Kotoko
Winner	Ghana Premier League	2013
Runner-up	Ghanaian FA Cup	2013
Winner	Ghana Super Cup	2013
Ghana
3rd	African Under-17 Championship	2007
4th	FIFA under-17 world Cup	2007
Winner	African Youth Championship	2009
Winner	FIFA U-20 World Cup	2009
Runner-up	Africa Cup of Nations	2010
- * Club domestic league appearances and goals as of 21 March 2018 ‡ National team caps and goals as of 15 December 2013

Ransford Osei (born 5 December 1990) is a Ghanaian former professional footballer, who last played as a striker for Lithuanian club Palanga.

== Club career ==
=== Early career ===
Osei began his career at his homeland club Kessben FC now Medeama Sporting Club, On 28 February 2008, he was set to join Polish club Legia Warsaw on a six-month loan contract which gave the Polish club the option to buy the player during that time. Due to a work permit issue, the transfer was blocked by FIFA. Osei stayed in Kessben.

=== Maccabi Haifa ===
In 2008, he joined Israel-based side Maccabi Haifa on loan. He subsequently signed a three-year contract of employment.

=== Twente ===
In July 2009, Osei joined Dutch side FC Twente on a year-long loan deal.

=== Granada ===
In August 2010, Granada CF announced that they had signed Osei on loan, and that he would join up with their second team Granada B.

=== Bloemfontein Celtic ===
After a short trial period, South African club Bloemfontein Celtic gave Ransford Osei a six-month contract in January 2012.

=== Asante Kotoko ===
In July 2012, Osei signed for 22-time champions of Ghana, and two times champions of Africa, Asante Kotoko. In September 2013, he turned down a contract renewal by Asante Kotoko, before being left out of Asante Kotoko's 2014 CAF Champions League's squad in the December. He won the Ghana Premier League on two occasions whilst playing for the Kumasi-based club.

=== Polokwane City ===
In January 2015, Osei signed for South African Premier Soccer League side Polokwane City on a three-year contract. After managing just three substitute appearances due to injury, he was released by Polokwane City prior to the start of the 2015–16 season.

=== RoPS ===
After going on trial with Kazakhstan Premier League side FC Shakhter Karagandy at the beginning of February, Osei played for RoPS in their Finnish League Cup match against PS Kemi Kings on 16 February. Five days later, 21 February, Osei signed a two-year contract with RoPS. He was later loaned to Santa Claus.

== International career ==
=== 2007 African Under-17 Championship ===
He featured for Ghana at the U-17 level in 2007. He played a key role in the Black Starlets' journey to placing 3rd at the 2007 African U-17 Championship. At the end of the tournament he was award Silver Boot for scoring the 2nd highest number of goals.

=== 2007 FIFA U-17 World Cup ===
On 20 August, he found the net twice in the 12 and 44th minute against Trinidad and Tobago in Ghana's 4–1 win during their first group game. Osei went on to score two more goals against Germany and Colombia, to take Ghana into the last sixteen of the FIFA U-17 World Cup, where they met and defeated favorites Brazil despite playing the entire second half with only ten men

On 1 September, Osei set up the first goal and scored the second as the Ghanaians beat Peru 2–0 to take them into the U-17 semi-final match against Spain.

Osei finished the U-17 World Cup with the Adidas Silver Shoe as the competitions second highest goalscorer, coming second by one goal to Macauley Chrisantus of Nigeria. He scored his sixth and final goal of the Tournament came in the third place play-off in the tournament as Ghana lost 2–1 to Germany.

=== 2009 FIFA U-20 World Cup ===
Osei scored in his first game against Uzbekistan in the 2009 FIFA U-20 World Cup one goal and played 90 minutes. He scored also another goal in his second game against England national under-20 football team and played 85 minutes.

=== Senior internationals ===
On 13 November 2007, three weeks before his 17th birthday, he received his first senior International call-up from Ghana coach Claude Le Roy for a FIFA International friendly match against Togo at the Ohene Djan Stadium in Accra, Ghana, on 18 November 2007 after scoring a superb hat-trick against Togo's U17 team in a Junior International friendly at the same venue on Sunday 11 November 2007. He was selected among the nations 2010 Africa Cup of Nations squad even though he didn't appear in any of the matches. Ghana won silver in that tournament.

== Style of play ==
A Striker described by FIFA.com as "an opportunistic goal machine" with superb pace and movement, young free-scoring sensation Osei was recognized by World Soccer Magazine as one of the 50 Most Exciting Teenagers on the Planet in their November 2007 Issue.

When it comes to designing the perfect striker, he has one particular model in mind. " I'd love to have Patrick Kluivert's heading ability, the speed and ball control of Samuel Eto'o and the finishing skills of Thierry Henry. I've got a few videos of him that I watch very closely". "Whenever I miss chances I can't sleep at night," Osei, the adidas Silver Shoe winner at the 2007 U-17 World Cup, tells FIFA.com. " I go through them over and over again in my mind, replaying them until I find the exact movement I should have made out on the pitch. When I'm sure I've learned my lesson I relax a little bit, but even then I know I'm not going to sleep that well."

== Career statistics ==
=== Club ===
As of match played 9 May 2015

Appearances and goals by club, season and competition
Club	Season	League			National Cup		League Cup		Continental		Other		Total	
Club	Season	Division	Apps	Goals	Apps	Goals	Apps	Goals	Apps	Goals	Apps	Goals	Apps	Goals
Kessben	2006–07	Ghana Premier League	4	0			–				–		4	0
Kessben	2007–08	Ghana Premier League	11	0			–				–		11	0
Kessben	2008–09	Ghana Premier League	15	3			–				–		15	3
Kessben	Total		30	3			-	-			-	-	30	3
Maccabi Haifa	2008–09	Israeli Premier League	11	2					–		–		11	2
Twente (loan)	2009–10	Eredivisie	0	0	0	0	–		0	0	–		0	0
Granada B (loan)	2010–11	Primera División Andaluza					–		–		–			
Bloemfontein Celtic	2011–12	Premier Soccer League	4	1	0	0	–		–		–		4	1
Asante Kotoko	2012–13	Ghana Premier League	13	3			–				–		13	3
Asante Kotoko	2013–14	Ghana Premier League	6	0			–				–		6	0
Asante Kotoko	Total		19	3			-	-			-	-	19	3
Polokwane City	2014–15	Premier Soccer League	3	0	0	0	–		–		–		3	0
Career total			67	9	0	0	0	0	0	0	0	0	67	9

=== International ===
As of match played 11 August 2010

Ghana
Year	Apps	Goals
2010	2	0
Total	2	0

== Honours ==
Maccabi Haifa

- Israeli Premier League: 2008–09

Asante Kotoko

- Ghana Premier League: 2012–13, 2013–14
- Ghana Super Cup: 2012–13

Ghana U-20

- FIFA U-20 World Cup: 2009
- African Youth Championship: 2009

Individual

- 2009 African Youth Championship – (Golden Boot)
- 2007 African Under-17 Championship – (Golden Boot)
- 2007 FIFA U-17 World Cup – (Silver Boot)
