= Kingsley Udoh =

Nigerian footballer (born 1990)

Personal information
- Full name: Kingsley Udoh
- Date of birth: December 7, 1990 (age 35)
- Place of birth: Nigeria
- Height: 1.82 m (6 ft 0 in)
- Position: Defender

Team information
- Current team: Sunshine Stars
- Number: 35

Youth career
- –2006: Global Crystal Academy

Senior career*
Years	Team	Apps	(Gls)
2007–2009	Akwa United	34	(3)
2010–2013	Heartland	63	(8)
2013–2015	Kano Pillars	42	(4)
2015–	Sunshine Stars	2	(0)

International career^{‡}
2007	Nigeria U-17	7	(0)
2009	Nigeria U-20	5	(1)
2011	Nigeria U-23	1	(0)
2008	Nigeria	1	(0)
- * Club domestic league appearances and goals as of April 30, 2015 ‡ National team caps and goals as of April 30, 2015

Kingsley Udoh (born December 7, 1990) is a Nigerian footballer who plays as a central defender for Sunshine Stars.

== Club career ==
He began his career with the Global Crystal Academy before moving to Akwa United F.C. in the winter of 2007. In January 2009, Udoh would move to the Spanish team Atlético Madrid, but was not signed by the team. In February 2009 Udoh attracted interest from Olympiacos F.C. and Olympique Lyon. On 14 January 2010, he began a trial with FC Hansa Rostock. He returned to the Nigerian league in February 2010 and signed with Heartland of Owerri.

In 2012, he left Nigeria to train with Uruguayan team C.A. Peñarol but failed to sign a contract. After a reported move to Colombian club Llaneros F.C. fell through, he returned to Heartland in January 2013. In December 2013, he joined league rivals Kano Pillars.

== International career ==
He was a member of the team that won the U-17 African and World titles with where Nigeria defeated Spain on penalties.

Udoh was called into the Nigeria camp for the 2008 African Nations Cup but was cut from the final 23-man squad. He did however make his debut for the Super Eagles in the warm-up game with Sudan, which Nigeria won 2-0. Nigeria's manager Berti Vogts cited his inclusion as a way of gaining valuable experience. He has also played for the under-20 and the Olympic Eagles.

== Titles ==
Season	Club	Title
2007	Nigeria	African Under-17 Championship
2007	Nigeria	FIFA U-17 World Cup
