= Aly Badara Soumah =

Guinean footballer

Personal information
- Date of birth: 24 January 1990 (age 36)
- Place of birth: Conakry, Guinea
- Height: 1.80 m (5 ft 11 in)
- Position: Midfielder

Senior career*
Years	Team	Apps	(Gls)
2010–2012	Horoya AC		
2013	Satellite FC		
2013–2016	Horoya AC		
2016–	Hafia FC		

International career^{‡}
2011–2013	Guinea	3	(0)
- * Club domestic league appearances and goals as of 13 June 2021 ‡ National team caps and goals as of 13 June 2021

Aly Badara Soumah (born 24 January 1990) is a Guinean football midfielder.
