= Adrián Bone =

Ecuadorian footballer (born 1988)

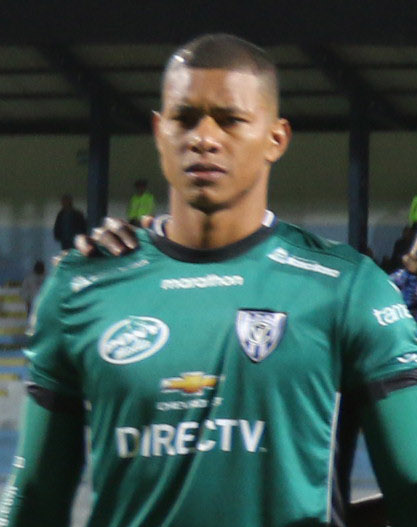
- Bone in 2017

Personal information
- Full name: Adrián Javier Bone Sánchez
- Date of birth: 8 September 1988 (age 38)
- Place of birth: Esmeraldas, Ecuador
- Height: 1.88 m (6 ft 2 in)
- Position: Goalkeeper

Team information
- Current team: CD Miguel Iturralde
- Number: 12

Senior career*
| Years | Team | Apps | (Gls) |
| 2006 | LDU de Cuenca | 6 | (0) |
| 2007 | Aucas | 0 | (0) |
| 2008–2010 | ESPOLI | 41 | (0) |
| 2011–2013 | Deportivo Quito | 47 | (0) |
| 2013–2017 | El Nacional | 160 | (0) |
| 2017 | Independiente del Valle | 36 | (0) |
| 2018–2022 | Emelec | 10 | (0) |
| 2023 | Técnico Universitario | 2 | (0) |
| 2024 | La Cantera FC | 0 | (0) |
| 2024 | Mushuc Runa | 0 | (0) |
| 2025- | CD Miguel Iturralde | 0 | (0) |

International career^{‡}
| 2011–2014 | Ecuador | 3 | (0) |
- * Club domestic league appearances and goals as of 16:34, 22 June 2024 (UTC) ‡ National team caps and goals as of 21:01, 26 June 2014 (UTC)

Adrián Javier Bone Sánchez (born 8 September 1988) is an Ecuadorian international footballer who plays as a goalkeeper for CD Miguel Iturralde.

== Club career ==
Bone has played for LDU de Cuenca, Aucas, ESPOLI, Deportivo Quito and El Nacional. While with Deportivo Quito, Bone won the 2011 Campeonato Ecuatoriano.

== International career ==
He made his senior international debut for Ecuador in 2011.

In June 2014, he was named in Ecuador's squad for the 2014 FIFA World Cup.
