= Bongani Ndulula =

South African footballer

Personal information
- Date of birth: 29 November 1989 (age 36)
- Place of birth: Aliwal North, South Africa
- Height: 1.90 m (6 ft 3 in)
- Position: Striker

Youth career
- Young Stars

Senior career*
Years	Team	Apps	(Gls)
–2009	Blackburn Rovers		
2009–2010	Bloemfontein Celtic	4	(1)
2010–2013	Orlando Pirates	20	(4)
2013–2015	AmaZulu	60	(13)
2015–2016	Kaizer Chiefs	4	(0)
2016–2017	Chippa United	0	(0)
2024-2026	Tshwane University of Technology	0	(0)

International career^{‡}
2014–2015	South Africa	10	(2)
- * Club domestic league appearances and goals as of 23 October 2022 ‡ National team caps and goals as of 23 October 2022

Bongani Ndulula (born 29 November 1989) is a South African former soccer player who last played as a striker for Tshwane University of Technology's football team in the ABC Motsepe League.

Ndulula scored his first international goal in his debut against Sudan in a 2015 Africa Cup Of Nations qualifier, and scored his second one month later against Congo. Chippa United F.C released Ndulula in 2017, he struggled to find a club until 2024 when ABC Motsepe League club Tshwane University of Technology signed him. In 2026 he announced his retirement from football.

== International goals ==
#	Date	Venue	Opponent	Score	Result	Competition
1.	5 September 2014	Al-Merrikh Stadium, Omdurman, Sudan	Sudan	3–0	3–0	2015 Africa Cup of Nations qualification
2.	11 October 2014	Stade Municipal, Pointe-Noire, Congo	Congo	1–0	2–0	2015 Africa Cup of Nations qualification
