= Michael Uchebo =

Nigerian footballer

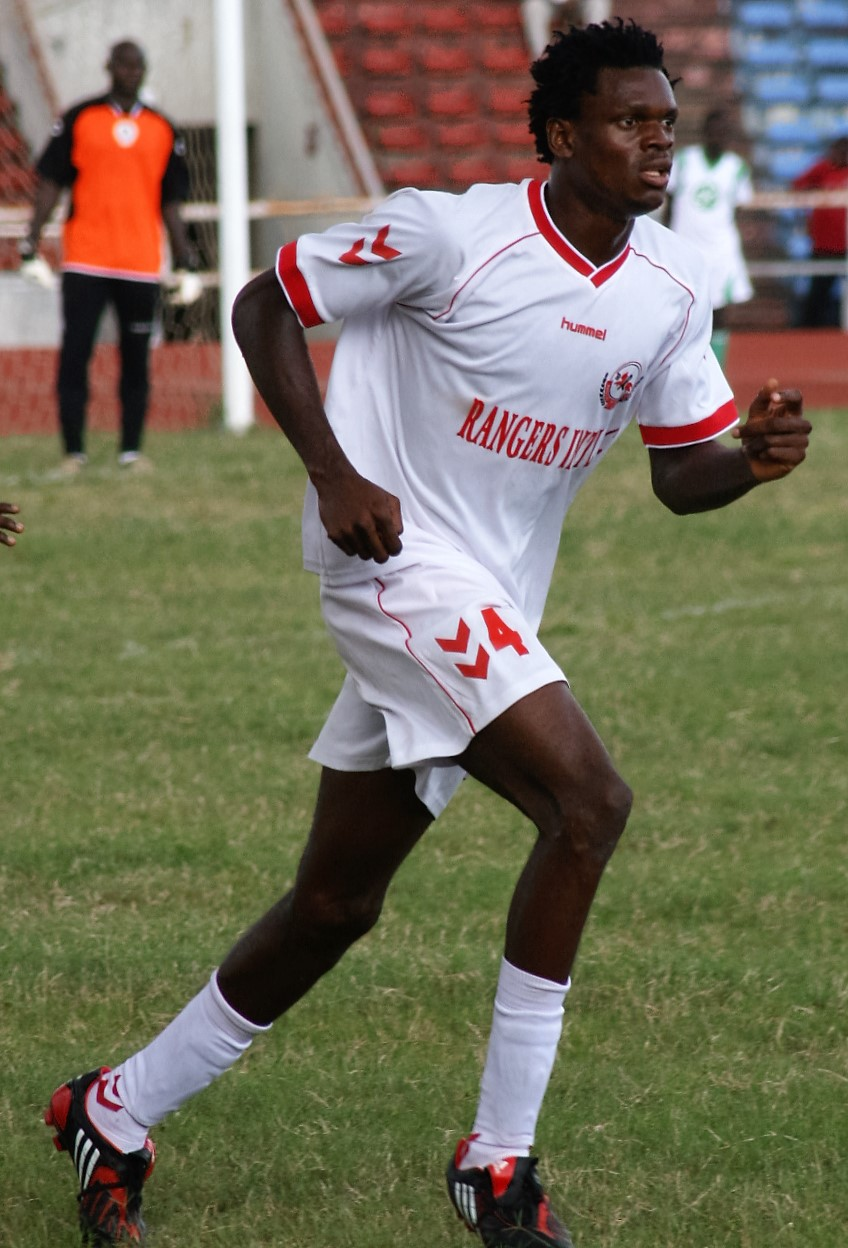

Personal information
- Full name: Michael Okechukwu Uchebo
- Date of birth: 3 February 1990 (age 36)
- Place of birth: Enugu, Nigeria
- Height: 1.94 m (6 ft 4 in)
- Position: Forward

Senior career*
Years	Team	Apps	(Gls)
2008–2009	Enugu Rangers	13	(2)
2010–2012	VVV-Venlo	58	(8)
2012–2014	Cercle Brugge	55	(7)
2014–2017	Boavista	41	(4)
2018–2019	Enugu Rangers	0	(0)

International career
2008–2009	Nigeria U-20	5	(3)
2014	Nigeria	5	(1)
- * Club domestic league appearances and goals

Michael Okechukwu Uchebo (born 2 February 1990) is a Nigerian former professional footballer who played as a forward. He made five appearances for the Nigeria national team, scoring once.

== Club career ==
Uchebo began his career in Enugu Rangers. He signed a three-year contract with VVV Venlo in October 2009. Venlo's football director Mario Captien described him as a physically very strong striker who is a target man at the front. Dutch Voetbal International referred to Uchebo as the new Nwankwo Kanu.

In November 2011, Venlo's chairman Hai Berden revealed that the club was in talks with English side Stoke City regarding the transfer of Uchebo. In January 2012 Uchebo joined Stoke City on trial. However, at the end of the trial, the club decided not to sign him. On 25 January, Uchebo joined Rangers on a trial. His trial at the club ended after just one day, with conflicting reports from the player and Rangers. The agent of Uchebo claimed that player cut short his trial due to a poor impression of Rangers after Ally McCoist did not attend the single training session in question, while McCoist said that it was a club decision.

After saving Venlo from relegation with a late goal in extra time of the Eredivisie relegation playoffs second round match against SC Cambuur, Uchebo revealed that he won't renew his expiring contract at VVV. On 29 May Venlo announced that they had reached an agreement with Cercle Brugge. Uchebo subsequently signed a two-year deal with Cercle Brugge.

On 11 October 2014, Uchebo signed for Boavista on a three-year contract. He scored his first goal on his first match, against Paços de Ferreira, in a 2–1 home loss.

== International career ==
Uchebo was a member of the Nigeria U-20 team and in August 2008 he scored his first goal for Nigeria in a match against Togo in the West African Football Union tournament. He also played at the U-20 2009 African Youth Championship tournament, scoring one goal in three matches. He was described in the media as the most sought-after player among the Nigeria squad in the tournament.

In June 2011 Uchebo was called up by current Olympic team and National U-23 coach Austin Eguavoen for the crucial return leg of the Olympic qualifiers against Tanzania.

In October 2011 U-23 coach Austin Eguavoen visited the Netherlands and met with officials of VVV Venlo to secure the release of Uchebo to participate in the inaugural edition of the CAF U-23 championship in Morocco.

He received his first call-up to the Nigeria national team in February 2014.

Uchebo earned his first senior cap on 6 March, in the 0–0 draw with Mexico in a friendly match, playing the first half before being replaced by Leon Balogun.

In the next of Nigeria's matches, a 2–2 draw with Scotland at Craven Cottage, Uchebo played 55 minutes of the match. After Scotland had taken the lead, Uchebo equalised before the break with a mid-range deflected effort. His replacement was Peter Odemwingie.
