= Abdel Fadel Suanon =

Beninese footballer

Personal information
- Date of birth: 24 June 1995 (age 31)
- Place of birth: Parakou, Dahomey (now Benin)
- Height: 1.82 m (6 ft 0 in)
- Position: Striker

Senior career*
Years	Team	Apps	(Gls)
2011–2013	Mogas 90	16	(13)
2013–2016	Étoile Sahel	7	(2)
2014–2015	→ Kairouan (loan)	10	(0)
2015–2016	→ Damac (loan)	28	(17)
2016–2019	Damac		
2020	Al-Washm		
2019–2021	Free State Stars	19	(2)
2021–2023	Al Kharaitiyat		

International career^{‡}
2015–	Benin	11	(1)
- * Club domestic league appearances and goals as of 18:04, 24 June 2017 (UTC) ‡ National team caps and goals as of 18:04, 24 June 2017 (UTC)

Abdel Fadel Suanon (born 24 June 1995) is a Beninese professional footballer who plays as a striker.

Suanon scored ten goals for Damac during the 2017–18 season.
