= Maxime Loïc Feudjou =

Cameroonian footballer

Personal information
- Full name: Maxime Loïc Feudjou Nguegang
- Date of birth: 14 April 1992 (age 34)
- Place of birth: Douala, Cameroon
- Height: 1.82 m (6 ft 0 in)
- Position: Goalkeeper

Senior career*
Years	Team	Apps	(Gls)
2010–2011	Botafogo Douala	13	(0)
2012–2014	Coton Sport	88	(0)
2015–2018	Al Hilal Club	14	(0)
2018–2019	Al-Orobah	14	(0)
2019–2022	Union Douala		
2022–2025	NAPSA Stars		

International career^{‡}
2011	Cameroon U23		
2012–2014	Cameroon	2	(0)
- * Club domestic league appearances and goals as of 14:15, 31 May 2014 (UTC) ‡ National team caps and goals as of 00:00, 8 June 2014 (UTC)

Maxime Loïc Feudjou Nguegang (born 14 April 1992) is a Cameroonian international footballer who plays as a goalkeeper.

== Club career ==
Feudjou was born in Douala. He made his senior debuts for third division Botafogo FC in 2010, joining local giants Coton Sport FC in December 2011. Feudjou was initially signed as a third-choice, behind Kassaly Daouda and Jean Efala; however, he was selected as a starter during the first matches of the season, and finished the season as first-choice. In September, he was linked to English Premier League side Reading, but nothing came of it.

In 2013, Feudjou played a key part for Coton Sport, helping the club to reach the semi-finals of CAF Champions League and also being a part of the squad which was crowned champions of the Elite One and the Cameroon Cup.

On 26 December 2019, Feudjou returned to Cameroon and joined Union Douala.

== Honours ==
- With Coton Sport
- Cameroon Premiere Division
- Champion (2) 2013,

2014

- Cameroon Cup
- Winner (1) 2014
- With Al-Hilal Club
- Sudan Premier League
- Champion (2) 2016, 2017
- Sudan Cup
- Winner (1) 2016

== International career ==
On 23 February 2012 Feudjou was called up to Cameroon's main squad for a 2013 Africa Cup of Nations qualification match against Guinea-Bissau. He made his debut on 29 May 2014, replacing Charles Itandje in a 1–2 loss against Paraguay.

On 7 June, Feudjou was handed his first start, playing the entire first half in a 1–0 success against Moldova.
