= Abdoulaye Fall =

Senegalese footballer (born 1989)

Personal information
- Date of birth: 18 May 1989 (age 37)
- Place of birth: Dakar, Senegal
- Height: 1.85 m (6 ft 1 in)
- Position: Central midfielder

Team information
- Current team: Fraga

Youth career
- 2007: Gorée
- 2007–2008: Benfica

Senior career*
Years	Team	Apps	(Gls)
2008–2011	La Vitréenne	40	(4)
2011–2012	Badajoz	23	(2)
2012–2014	Cádiz	51	(4)
2014	→ Sigma Olomouc (loan)	4	(0)
2014–2015	Linense	10	(3)
2015–2016	UCAM Murcia	13	(0)
2016	Alcoyano	7	(1)
2016–2017	Extremadura	30	(0)
2017–2020	Cornellà	74	(2)
2020	Peña Deportiva	6	(0)
2020–2022	Lleida Esportiu	40	(3)
2022–2023	Nejmeh	11	(0)
2023–2024	Binéfar	28	(0)
2024–	Fraga	7	(1)
- * Club domestic league appearances and goals as of 20 October 2024

Abdoulaye Fall (born 18 May 1989) is a Senegalese professional footballer who plays as a central midfielder for Spanish club Fraga.

== Club career ==
Born in Dakar, Fall joined S.L. Benfica's youth setup in October 2007, after a successful trial, from local US Gorée. On 9 March of the following year he was selected on the bench for the Primeira Liga match against União de Leiria, but remained unused in the 2–2 home draw.

In August 2008 Fall moved to La Vitréenne FC in France's CFA. After appearing regularly for the side he signed a two-year deal with Servette FC on 7 July 2011. After failing to gain a work permit, he moved to Spain and joined CD Badajoz in Segunda División B.

Fall appeared in 23 matches (21 starts, 1980 minutes of action) and scored two goals during the campaign, as his side were eventually relegated. On 27 July 2012 he signed for Cádiz CF, also in the third level, after a trial period.

Fall was an ever-present figure for the Yellow Submarine, and signed a new four-year deal on 21 February 2013. On 29 January of the following year he was loaned to SK Sigma Olomouc until June.

Fall played his first match as a professional on 22 February, starting in a 5–1 home routing over SK Slavia Prague for the Czech First League championship; he contributed with three further appearances (all starts) before returning to Cádiz in June. On 13 August he rescinded with the latter, and moved to fellow league team Real Balompédica Linense.

== Honours ==
Nejmeh

- Lebanese FA Cup: 2022–23
