= Phumelele Bhengu =

South African footballer (born 1989)

Personal information
- Full name: Phumelele Ace Bhengu
- Date of birth: 19 November 1989 (age 36)
- Place of birth: Natal, South Africa
- Positions: Winger; centre forward

Team information
- Current team: Tshakhuma Madzivhandila

Youth career
- 2003–2008: Moroka Swallows

Senior career*
Years	Team	Apps	(Gls)
2008–2011	Moroka Swallows	12	(2)
2011–2013	Mpumalanga Black Aces		
2011	→ Bay United (loan)		
2013	Chippa United	1	(0)
2013–2015	Thanda Royal Zulu	46	(26)
2015–2016	SuperSport United	4	(0)
2016–2017	Royal Eagles	15	(1)
2017–2018	Real Kings	20	(5)
2018–	Tshakhuma Madzivhandila	15	(11)

International career^{‡}
2009	South Africa U20	4	(0)
2015–	South Africa	3	(0)
- * Club domestic league appearances and goals as of 22:51, 6 October 2019 (UTC) ‡ National team caps and goals as of 3 January 2018

Phumelele Ace Bhengu (born 19 November 1989) is a South African footballer who plays as a winger or centre forward for Tshakhuma Madzivhandila.

== Club career ==
=== Moroka Swallows ===
Five years after joining Moroka Swallows' youth academy at the age of 14, in 2008 Bhengu started playing senior football in the Premier Soccer League. After scoring a brace against Kaizer Chiefs Bhengu was praised and compared to Benni McCarthy.

=== Bay United ===
In January 2011, Bhengu joined Bay United on a 6-month loan deal. At Bay United, Bhengu reverted to playing as a striker.

=== Chippa United ===
In January 2013, Bhengu joined Chippa United on a two-and-a-half-year deal, but was released two weeks later with Chippa United citing a lack of match fitness as the reason.

=== Thanda Royal Zulu ===
In the second half of 2013, Bhengu joined Thanda Royal Zulu and started reviving his career. Bhengu finished the 2014–15 season as the top-scorer, scoring 22 goals and setting a new National First Division record.

=== SuperSport United ===
After winning the National First Division's golden boot award, Bhengu turned down offers from Kaizer Chiefs and Mamelodi Sundowns to join SuperSport United. Bhengu's first season with SuperSport United was not successful, managing only four substitute appearances, prompting him to request a loan move to gain game-time.
