= 2009 FIFA U-20 World Cup squads =

FIFA championship roster

Players name marked in bold went on to earn full international caps. FIFA published the final lists with squad numbers on their website on 24 September.

== Eligibility of players ==
- Each Participating Member Association shall ensure the following when selecting its representative team for the World Cup:
  - all players shall be citizens of its country and subject to its jurisdiction;
  - all players shall be eligible for selection in accordance with the FIFA Statutes and relevant FIFA regulations.
- In addition to the above provision, each Participating Member Association shall ensure that all players of its representative team were born on or after 1 January 1989.
- In addition to the above provisions, players who have already taken part in a preliminary or final competition of the FIFA U-20 World Cup and/or have taken part in a preliminary or final competition of an Olympic Football Tournament may compete in this competition provided they still fulfill the above age requirement.
- Protests regarding the eligibility of players shall be decided by the FIFA Disciplinary Committee in accordance with the FIFA Disciplinary Code.
- The Participating Member Associations are responsible for fielding only eligible players. Failure to do so will lead to the consequences stipulated in the FIFA Disciplinary Code.

== Group A ==
=== Egypt ===
Head coach: (Czech Republic) Miroslav Soukup

No.	Pos.	Player	Date of birth (age)	Caps	Goals	Club
1	GK	Aly Lotfi	14 October 1989 (aged 19)			(Egyptian Football Association) ENPPI
2	DF	Salah Soliman	20 January 1990 (aged 19)			(Egyptian Football Association) Ghazl El-Mehalla
3	MF	Hesham Mohamed	3 January 1989 (aged 20)			(Egyptian Football Association) Al Ahly
4	MF	Mostafa Galal	22 July 1989 (aged 20)			(Egyptian Football Association) ENPPI
5	DF	**Moaz El Henawy** (c)	29 January 1990 (aged 19)			(Egyptian Football Association) Al Ahly (on loan to El-Masry)
6	DF	**Ahmed Hegazy**	25 January 1991 (aged 18)			(Egyptian Football Association) Ismaily
7	DF	Ahmed Reda	1 January 1989 (aged 20)			(Egyptian Football Association) El Shams
8	MF	Shehab El-Din Ahmed	22 August 1990 (aged 19)			(Egyptian Football Association) Al Ahly
9	FW	Mohamed Talaat	14 May 1989 (aged 20)			(Egyptian Football Association) Al Ahly
10	MF	Ahmed Shoukry	21 July 1989 (aged 20)			(Egyptian Football Association) Al Ahly
11	FW	Afroto	17 March 1989 (aged 20)			(Egyptian Football Association) Al Ahly
12	DF	Milo	1 November 1990 (aged 18)			(Egyptian Football Association) Haras El Hodood
13	DF	Ayman Ashraf	9 April 1991 (aged 18)			(Egyptian Football Association) Al Ahly
14	MF	**Hossam Hassan**	30 April 1989 (aged 20)			(Egyptian Football Association) ENPPI
15	DF	**Saad Samir**	1 April 1989 (aged 20)			(Egyptian Football Association) Al Ahly
16	GK	**Mohamed Bassam**	25 December 1990 (aged 18)			(Egyptian Football Association) El Geish
17	MF	Mahmoud Tobah	1 October 1989 (aged 19)			(Egyptian Football Association) Al Ahly
18	MF	Ahmed Magdy	9 December 1989 (aged 19)			(Egyptian Football Association) Ghazl El-Mehalla
19	FW	Bogy	28 January 1989 (aged 20)			(Egyptian Football Association) Zamalek
20	MF	Hossam Arafat	18 January 1990 (aged 19)			(Egyptian Football Association) Zamalek
21	GK	**Mohamed Abou Gabal**	29 January 1989 (aged 20)			(Egyptian Football Association) ENPPI

=== Italy ===
Head coach: Francesco Rocca

No.	Pos.	Player	Date of birth (age)	Caps	Goals	Club
1	GK	Vincenzo Fiorillo (c)	13 January 1990 (aged 19)			(Italian Football Federation) Sampdoria
2	DF	Alessandro Crescenzi	25 September 1991 (aged 17)			(Italian Football Federation) Roma (on loan to Grosseto)
3	DF	Antonio Mazzotta	2 August 1989 (aged 20)			(Italian Football Federation) Palermo (on loan to Lecce)
4	DF	Matteo Gentili	21 August 1989 (aged 20)			(Italian Football Federation) Atalanta (on loan to Varese)
5	DF	Michelangelo Albertazzi	7 January 1991 (aged 18)			(Italian Football Federation) Milan
6	DF	Marco Calderoni	18 February 1989 (aged 20)			(Italian Football Federation) Piacenza
7	MF	Claudio Della Penna	12 May 1989 (aged 20)			(Italian Football Federation) Roma
8	MF	Andrea Mazzarani	6 November 1989 (aged 19)			(Italian Football Federation) Udinese (on loan to Crotone)
9	FW	Umberto Eusepi	9 January 1989 (aged 20)			(Italian Football Federation) Genoa (on loan to Reggiana)
10	MF	Fabio Sciacca	16 May 1989 (aged 20)			(Italian Football Federation) Catania
11	FW	Gianvito Misuraca	2 April 1990 (aged 19)			(Italian Football Federation) Vicenza
12	GK	Andrea Gasparri	28 February 1989 (aged 20)			(Italian Football Federation) Parma (on loan to Giulianova)
13	DF	Francesco Bini	2 January 1989 (aged 20)			(Italian Football Federation) Piacenza
14	DF	Matteo Bruscagin	3 August 1989 (aged 20)			(Italian Football Federation) Milan (on loan to Gubbio)
15	DF	Vasco Regini	9 September 1990 (aged 19)			(Italian Football Federation) Sampdoria
16	MF	**Giacomo Bonaventura**	22 August 1989 (aged 20)			(Italian Football Federation) Atalanta
17	MF	Mattia Mustacchio	17 May 1989 (aged 20)			(Italian Football Federation) Sampdoria
18	MF	Silvano Raggio Garibaldi	27 March 1989 (aged 20)			(Italian Football Federation) Genoa
19	MF	Marco Romizi	13 February 1990 (aged 19)			(Italian Football Federation) Reggiana
20	FW	Piergiuseppe Maritato	19 March 1989 (aged 20)			(Italian Football Federation) Fiorentina (on loan to Gallipoli)
21	GK	Antonio Piccolo	18 July 1990 (aged 19)			(Italian Football Federation) Juventus

=== Paraguay ===
Head coach: (Argentina) Adrián Coria

No.	Pos.	Player	Date of birth (age)	Caps	Goals	Club
1	GK	**Joel Silva** (c)	13 January 1989 (aged 20)			(Paraguayan Football Association) Guaraní
2	DF	**Iván Piris**	3 October 1989 (aged 19)			(Paraguayan Football Association) Cerro Porteño
3	DF	**Ronald Huth**	30 August 1989 (aged 20)			(Italian Football Federation) Vicenza
4	DF	**César Benítez**	22 May 1990 (aged 19)			(Paraguayan Football Association) Cerro Porteño
5	DF	Francisco Silva	18 October 1990 (aged 18)			(Paraguayan Football Association) Libertad
6	MF	**Rodrigo Burgos**	21 June 1989 (aged 20)			(Paraguayan Football Association) Cerro Porteño
7	MF	**Celso Ortiz**	26 January 1989 (aged 20)			(Paraguayan Football Association) Cerro Porteño
8	MF	**Hernán Pérez**	25 February 1989 (aged 20)			(Royal Spanish Football Federation) Villarreal
9	FW	**Robin Ramírez**	11 November 1989 (aged 19)			(Paraguayan Football Association) Libertad
10	MF	**Gustavo Cristaldo**	3 May 1989 (aged 20)			(Paraguayan Football Association) Libertad
11	FW	**Federico Santander**	4 June 1991 (aged 18)			(Paraguayan Football Association) Guaraní
12	GK	Gerardo Ortiz	25 March 1989 (aged 20)			(Argentine Football Association) Quilmes
13	DF	Aldo Paniagua	12 July 1989 (aged 20)			(Paraguayan Football Association) 12 de Octubre
14	DF	Rolando García	10 February 1990 (aged 19)			(Argentine Football Association) Defensa y Justicia
15	MF	Derlis Orué	2 January 1989 (aged 20)			(Paraguayan Football Association) 12 de Octubre
16	MF	**Jorge Moreira**	1 February 1990 (aged 19)			(Paraguayan Football Association) 2 de Mayo
17	MF	Nicolás Martínez	15 February 1989 (aged 20)			(Mexican Football Federation) Puebla
18	MF	**Lorenzo Melgarejo**	10 August 1990 (aged 19)			(Paraguayan Football Association) 12 de Octubre
19	FW	Luis Páez	19 December 1989 (aged 19)			(Paraguayan Football Association) Tacuary
20	FW	**Luis Caballero**	22 April 1990 (aged 19)			(Paraguayan Football Association) Olimpia
21	GK	Rubén Escobar	6 February 1991 (aged 18)			(Paraguayan Football Association) Libertad

=== Trinidad and Tobago ===
Head coach: (Serbia) Zoran Vraneš

No.	Pos.	Player	Date of birth (age)	Caps	Goals	Club
1	GK	Samuel Glenroy	5 April 1990 (aged 19)			(Trinidad and Tobago Football Association) United Petrotrin
2	DF	**Aubrey David**	11 October 1990 (aged 18)			(Trinidad and Tobago Football Association) W Connection
3	DF	**Curtis Gonzales**	26 January 1989 (aged 20)			(Trinidad and Tobago Football Association) Joe Public
4	DF	**Sheldon Bateau**	29 January 1991 (aged 18)			(Trinidad and Tobago Football Association) San Juan Jabloteh
5	DF	**Akeem Adams**	13 April 1991 (aged 18)			(Trinidad and Tobago Football Association) United Petrotrin
6	MF	**Leston Paul** (c)	11 March 1990 (aged 19)			(United States Soccer Federation) University of South Florida
7	MF	**Kevin Molino**	17 June 1990 (aged 19)			(Trinidad and Tobago Football Association) Ma Pau
8	MF	**Sean de Silva**	17 January 1990 (aged 19)			(United States Soccer Federation) College of Charleston
9	FW	**Jamal Gay**	9 February 1989 (aged 20)			(German Football Association) Rot-Weiß Oberhausen
10	FW	Qian Grosvenor	28 April 1989 (aged 20)			(United States Soccer Federation) University of South Florida
11	MF	**Khaleem Hyland**	5 June 1989 (aged 20)			(Royal Belgian Football Association) Zulte Waregem
12	DF	**Robert Primus**	10 November 1990 (aged 18)			(Trinidad and Tobago Football Association) San Juan Jabloteh
13	FW	**Juma Clarence**	17 March 1989 (aged 20)			(Trinidad and Tobago Football Association) United Petrotrin
14	MF	Jean Luc Rochford	10 November 1990 (aged 18)			(Trinidad and Tobago Football Association) Joe Public
15	DF	Uriah Bentick	5 February 1989 (aged 20)			(United States Soccer Federation) Liberty University
16	MF	**Marcus Joseph**	29 April 1991 (aged 18)			(Trinidad and Tobago Football Association) Joe Public
17	DF	**Mekeil Williams**	24 July 1990 (aged 19)			(Trinidad and Tobago Football Association) Ma Pau
18	MF	**Jake Thomson**	12 May 1989 (aged 20)			(The Football Association) Southampton
19	DF	**Daneil Cyrus**	15 December 1990 (aged 18)			(Trinidad and Tobago Football Association) Joe Public
20	GK	Andre Marchan	11 August 1990 (aged 19)			(Trinidad and Tobago Football Association) Joe Public
21	GK	Jesse Fullerton	20 October 1990 (aged 18)			(United States Soccer Federation) Nova Southeastern University

== Group B ==
=== Nigeria ===
Head coach: Samson Siasia

No.	Pos.	Player	Date of birth (age)	Caps	Goals	Club
1	GK	Dele Ajiboye	7 August 1990 (aged 19)			(Royal Spanish Football Federation) Pontevedra
2	DF	Daniel Adejo	7 August 1989 (aged 20)			(Italian Football Federation) Reggina
3	DF	Nurudeen Orelesi	10 April 1989 (aged 20)			(Football Association of Slovenia) Bonifika
4	DF	**Nwankwo Obiora**	12 July 1991 (aged 18)			(Nigeria Football Federation) Wikki Tourists
5	DF	**Raheem Lawal**	4 May 1990 (aged 19)			(Royal Spanish Football Federation) Atlético Baleares
6	DF	Ibok Edet	22 August 1989 (aged 20)			(Royal Spanish Football Federation) Atlético Baleares
7	FW	King Osanga	6 October 1990 (aged 18)			(Nigeria Football Federation) Heartland
8	FW	**Odion Ighalo** (c)	16 June 1989 (aged 20)			(Italian Football Federation) Udinese
9	FW	Kehinde Fatai	19 February 1990 (aged 19)			(Romanian Football Federation) Farul Constanța
10	MF	**Rabiu Ibrahim**	15 March 1991 (aged 18)			(Portuguese Football Federation) Sporting CP
11	FW	Danny Uchechi	14 September 1989 (aged 20)			(The Football Association) West Ham United
12	GK	Uche Okafor	10 February 1991 (aged 18)			(Nigeria Football Federation) Kaduna Utd
13	MF	Yakubu Alfa	31 December 1990 (aged 18)			(Swedish Football Association) Helsingborg
14	FW	**Sone Aluko**	19 February 1989 (aged 20)			(Scottish Football Association) Aberdeen
15	MF	Oluwasina Abe	4 April 1991 (aged 18)			(Nigeria Football Federation) Sunshine Stars
16	FW	Stanley Ohawuchi	27 May 1990 (aged 19)			(Nigeria Football Federation) Bayelsa United
17	MF	**Gbolahan Salami**	15 April 1991 (aged 18)			(Nigeria Football Federation) Sunshine Stars
18	MF	Shagari Mohammed	29 November 1990 (aged 18)			(Nigeria Football Federation) Kano Pillars
19	DF	Harmony Ikande	17 September 1990 (aged 19)			(Italian Football Federation) Milan
20	MF	**Lukman Haruna**	4 December 1990 (aged 18)			(French Football Federation) Monaco
21	GK	Oladejo Olateru	28 May 1989 (aged 20)			(Nigeria Football Federation) Clique Sports Academy

=== Venezuela ===
Head coach: César Farías

No.	Pos.	Player	Date of birth (age)	Caps	Goals	Club
1	GK	**Rafael Romo**	25 February 1990 (aged 19)			(Italian Football Federation) Udinese
2	DF	**Ágnel Flores**	25 September 1989 (aged 19)			(Venezuelan Football Federation) Minervén
3	DF	**Carlos Salazar**	15 May 1989 (aged 20)			(Venezuelan Football Federation) Deportivo Anzoátegui
4	DF	**José Manuel Velázquez**	8 September 1990 (aged 19)			(Venezuelan Football Federation) Deportivo Anzoátegui
5	MF	**Francisco Flores** (c)	12 December 1990 (aged 18)			(Venezuelan Football Federation) ACD Lara
6	MF	Guillermo Ramírez	16 January 1990 (aged 19)			(Venezuelan Football Federation) Caracas
7	FW	**Yonathan Del Valle**	28 May 1990 (aged 19)			(Venezuelan Football Federation) Deportivo Táchira
8	MF	Mauricio Parra	6 February 1990 (aged 19)			(Venezuelan Football Federation) Deportivo Táchira
9	FW	**Salomón Rondón**	16 September 1989 (aged 20)			(Royal Spanish Football Federation) Las Palmas
10	MF	**Ángelo Peña**	25 December 1989 (aged 19)			(Portuguese Football Federation) Braga
11	FW	Carlos Fernández	9 November 1990 (aged 18)			(Venezuelan Football Federation) Deportivo Anzoátegui
12	GK	Virgilio Piñero	30 April 1989 (aged 20)			(Venezuelan Football Federation) ACD Lara
13	DF	**Pablo Camacho**	12 December 1990 (aged 18)			(Royal Spanish Football Federation) Espanyol
14	DF	Óscar Rojas	16 January 1990 (aged 19)			(Venezuelan Football Federation) Llaneros
15	DF	Henry Pernía	9 November 1990 (aged 18)			(Venezuelan Football Federation) Llaneros
16	MF	Juan Manuel Morales	29 May 1989 (aged 20)			(Royal Spanish Football Federation) Tenerife
17	FW	Adrián Lezama	22 July 1989 (aged 20)			(Venezuelan Football Federation) Deportivo Italia
18	MF	Víctor Pérez	4 March 1989 (aged 20)			(Venezuelan Football Federation) Carabobo
19	MF	**Yohandry Orozco**	19 March 1991 (aged 18)			(Venezuelan Football Federation) Maracaibo
20	MF	**Rafael Acosta**	13 February 1989 (aged 20)			(Italian Football Federation) Cagliari
21	GK	Ronald Garcés	17 May 1989 (aged 20)			(Venezuelan Football Federation) Carabobo

=== Spain ===
Head coach: Luis Milla

No.	Pos.	Player	Date of birth (age)	Caps	Goals	Club
1	GK	**Sergio Asenjo**	28 June 1989 (aged 20)			(Royal Spanish Football Federation) Atlético Madrid
2	DF	**César Azpilicueta** (c)	28 August 1989 (aged 20)			(Royal Spanish Football Federation) Osasuna
3	DF	José Ángel Valdés	5 September 1989 (aged 20)			(Royal Spanish Football Federation) Sporting Gijón
4	DF	**Álvaro Domínguez**	15 May 1989 (aged 20)			(Royal Spanish Football Federation) Atlético Madrid
5	DF	Alberto Botía	27 January 1989 (aged 20)			(Royal Spanish Football Federation) Barcelona
6	MF	Marcos Gullón	20 February 1989 (aged 20)			(Royal Spanish Football Federation) Villarreal
7	MF	Aarón Ñíguez	26 April 1989 (aged 20)			(Royal Spanish Football Federation) Valencia
8	MF	**Ander Herrera**	14 September 1989 (aged 20)			(Royal Spanish Football Federation) Zaragoza
9	FW	Kike	25 November 1989 (aged 19)			(Royal Spanish Football Federation) Murcia
10	MF	**Dani Parejo**	16 April 1989 (aged 20)			(Royal Spanish Football Federation) Getafe
11	MF	**Jordi Alba**	21 March 1989 (aged 20)			(Royal Spanish Football Federation) Valencia
12	DF	Andreu Fontàs	14 November 1989 (aged 19)			(Royal Spanish Football Federation) Barcelona
13	GK	Tomás Mejías	30 January 1989 (aged 20)			(Royal Spanish Football Federation) Real Madrid
14	DF	Víctor Laguardia	5 November 1989 (aged 19)			(Royal Spanish Football Federation) Zaragoza
15	MF	Dídac Vilà	9 June 1989 (aged 20)			(Royal Spanish Football Federation) Espanyol
16	MF	Oriol Romeu	24 September 1991 (aged 18)			(Royal Spanish Football Federation) Barcelona
17	MF	Fran Mérida	4 March 1990 (aged 19)			(The Football Association) Arsenal
18	FW	Óscar de Marcos	14 April 1989 (aged 20)			(Royal Spanish Football Federation) Athletic Bilbao
19	FW	Iago Falque	4 April 1990 (aged 19)			(Italian Football Federation) Juventus (on loan to Bari)
20	FW	**Emilio Nsue**	30 September 1989 (aged 19)			(Royal Spanish Football Federation) Mallorca
21	GK	Diego Mariño	9 May 1990 (aged 19)			(Royal Spanish Football Federation) Villarreal

=== Tahiti ===
Head coach: (France) Lionel Charbonnier

No.	Pos.	Player	Date of birth (age)	Caps	Goals	Club
1	GK	Teave Teamotuaitau	17 April 1992 (aged 17)			(Tahitian Football Federation) Tiare
2	DF	Taumihau Tiatia	25 July 1991 (aged 18)			(French Football Federation) Wasquehal
3	DF	**Stephane Faatiarau**	13 March 1990 (aged 19)			(Tahitian Football Federation) Tefana
4	DF	**Teheivarii Ludivion**	1 July 1989 (aged 20)			(Tahitian Football Federation) Vénus
5	DF	Ariihau Teriitau (c)	23 January 1989 (aged 20)			(Tahitian Football Federation) Vaiete
6	MF	**Heimano Bourebare**	15 May 1989 (aged 20)			(Tahitian Football Federation) Tefana
7	FW	Garry Rochette	6 January 1990 (aged 19)			(Tahitian Football Federation) Taravao AC
8	FW	Heiarii Tavanae	15 February 1992 (aged 17)			(Tahitian Football Federation) Central Sport
9	MF	Hiva Kamoise	17 January 1992 (aged 17)			(Tahitian Football Federation) Jeunes Tahitiens
10	FW	Jay Warren	4 May 1989 (aged 20)			(Tahitian Football Federation) Pirae
11	FW	**Stanley Atani**	27 January 1990 (aged 19)			(Tahitian Football Federation) Jeunes Tahitiens
12	GK	Ralph Heitaa	7 August 1991 (aged 18)			(Tahitian Football Federation) Vaiarii Nui
13	FW	**Teaonui Tehau**	1 September 1992 (aged 16)			(Tahitian Football Federation) Vénus
14	FW	**Steevy Chong Hue**	26 January 1990 (aged 19)			(Tahitian Football Federation) Samine
15	FW	Maheanuu Tua	8 March 1991 (aged 18)			(Tahitian Football Federation) Vaiete
16	GK	Teheipuarii Hauata	20 January 1991 (aged 18)			(Tahitian Football Federation) Tefana
17	FW	Benson Manarii	30 January 1991 (aged 18)			(Tahitian Football Federation) Vaiete
18	FW	Patrick Tepa	28 May 1989 (aged 20)			(Tahitian Football Federation) Vaiete
19	DF	Marama Amau	13 January 1991 (aged 18)			(Tahitian Football Federation) Vénus
20	MF	**Lorenzo Tehau**	10 April 1989 (aged 20)			(Tahitian Football Federation) Tefana
21	MF	**Alvin Tehau**	10 April 1989 (aged 20)			(Tahitian Football Federation) Tefana

== Group C ==
=== Cameroon ===
Head coach: Alain Wabo

No.	Pos.	Player	Date of birth (age)	Caps	Goals	Club
1	GK	François Beyokol (c)	12 March 1989 (aged 20)			(Cameroonian Football Federation) Canon Yaoundé
2	MF	Olivier Mvondo	21 November 1989 (aged 19)			(Swiss Football Association) Wil
3	DF	Sylvain Abad	4 May 1990 (aged 19)			(Cameroonian Football Federation) Elig Edzoa
4	DF	**Banana Yaya**	29 July 1991 (aged 18)			(Tunisian Football Federation) Espérance
5	MF	Enow Tabot	8 June 1989 (aged 20)			(Football Association of Slovenia) Interblock Ljubljana
6	DF	Charley Fomen	9 July 1989 (aged 20)			(French Football Federation) Marseille
7	MF	**Olivier Boumal**	17 September 1989 (aged 20)			(Royal Spanish Football Federation) Albacete
8	DF	Etienne Soppo	20 August 1990 (aged 19)			(Italian Football Federation) Casale
9	FW	Brice Owona	4 March 1989 (aged 20)			(Cameroonian Football Federation) Coton Sport
10	FW	**Jacques Zoua**	6 September 1991 (aged 18)			(Swiss Football Association) Basel
11	DF	**Adolphe Teikeu**	23 June 1990 (aged 19)			(Ukrainian Association of Football) Metalurh Zaporizhya
12	GK	Thierry Tangouantio	4 May 1992 (aged 17)			(Cameroonian Football Federation) Elig Edzoa
13	MF	Louisse Parfait	6 July 1990 (aged 19)			(Italian Football Federation) Genoa (on loan to Piacenza)
14	FW	**Patrick Ekeng**	26 March 1990 (aged 19)			(French Football Federation) Le Mans
15	FW	Etienne Eto'o	10 January 1990 (aged 19)			(Royal Spanish Football Federation) Mallorca
16	GK	Joseph Leke Asong	11 August 1989 (aged 20)			(Royal Spanish Football Federation) Espanyol
17	FW	Tiko Messina	29 April 1990 (aged 19)			(Royal Spanish Football Federation) Mallorca
18	MF	Jean-Jules Bapidi Fils	8 March 1989 (aged 20)			(Tunisian Football Federation) Espérance
19	FW	Donald Djoussé	18 March 1990 (aged 19)			(Georgian Football Federation) Dinamo Tbilisi
20	MF	Ghislain Mvom	23 October 1992 (aged 16)			(Cameroonian Football Federation) Fortuna Yaoundé
21	MF	Andre Akono Effa	15 May 1989 (aged 20)			(Cameroonian Football Federation) Canon Yaoundé

=== South Korea ===
Head coach: Hong Myung-bo

No.	Pos.	Player	Date of birth (age)	Caps	Goals	Club
1	GK	**Lee Bum-young**	2 April 1989 (aged 20)			(Korea Football Association) Busan I'Park
2	DF	**Oh Jae-suk**	4 January 1990 (aged 19)			(Korea Football Association) Kyung Hee University
3	DF	**Kim Min-woo**	25 February 1990 (aged 19)			(Korea Football Association) Yonsei University
4	DF	Lim Jong-eun	18 June 1990 (aged 19)			(Korea Football Association) Ulsan Hyundai
5	DF	**Kim Young-gwon**	27 February 1990 (aged 19)			(Korea Football Association) Jeonju University
6	DF	**Hong Jeong-ho**	12 August 1989 (aged 20)			(Korea Football Association) Chosun University
7	MF	**Koo Ja-cheol** (c)	27 February 1989 (aged 20)			(Korea Football Association) Jeju United
8	MF	Seo Yong-duk	10 September 1989 (aged 20)			(Japan Football Association) Omiya Ardija
9	FW	**Kim Dong-sub**	29 March 1989 (aged 20)			(Japan Football Association) Tokushima Vortis
10	FW	**Cho Young-cheol**	31 May 1989 (aged 20)			(Japan Football Association) Albirex Niigata
11	FW	**Seo Jung-jin**	6 September 1989 (aged 20)			(Korea Football Association) Jeonbuk Motors
12	GK	**Kim Seung-gyu**	30 September 1990 (aged 18)			(Korea Football Association) Ulsan Hyundai
13	DF	**Jeong Dong-ho**	7 March 1990 (aged 19)			(Japan Football Association) Yokohama F. Marinos
14	MF	Moon Ki-han	17 March 1989 (aged 20)			(Korea Football Association) FC Seoul
15	MF	Choi Sung-keun	28 July 1991 (aged 18)			(Korea Football Association) Eonnam High School
16	DF	Jang Suk-won	11 August 1989 (aged 20)			(Korea Football Association) Dankook University
17	DF	**Yun Suk-young**	13 February 1990 (aged 19)			(Korea Football Association) Chunnam Dragons
18	FW	**Lee Seung-yeoul**	6 March 1989 (aged 20)			(Korea Football Association) FC Seoul
19	FW	**Kim Bo-kyung**	6 October 1989 (aged 19)			(Korea Football Association) Hongik University
20	FW	Park Hee-seong	7 April 1990 (aged 19)			(Korea Football Association) Korea University
21	GK	Kim Da-sol	4 January 1989 (aged 20)			(Korea Football Association) Yonsei University

=== Germany ===
Head coach: Horst Hrubesch

No.	Pos.	Player	Date of birth (age)	Caps	Goals	Club
1	GK	**Ron-Robert Zieler**	12 February 1989 (aged 20)			(The Football Association) Manchester United
2	DF	**Sebastian Jung**	22 June 1990 (aged 19)			(German Football Association) Eintracht Frankfurt
3	DF	David Vržogić	10 August 1989 (aged 20)			(German Football Association) Borussia Dortmund
4	DF	Florian Jungwirth (c)	27 January 1989 (aged 20)			(German Football Association) 1860 Munich
5	MF	**Lars Bender**	27 April 1989 (aged 20)			(German Football Association) Bayer Leverkusen
6	MF	**Sven Bender**	27 April 1989 (aged 20)			(German Football Association) Borussia Dortmund
7	MF	Timo Perthel	11 February 1989 (aged 20)			(German Football Association) Werder Bremen
8	MF	**Mario Vrančić**	23 May 1989 (aged 20)			(German Football Association) Mainz 05
9	FW	Richard Sukuta-Pasu	24 June 1990 (aged 19)			(German Football Association) Bayer Leverkusen
10	MF	**Lewis Holtby**	18 September 1990 (aged 19)			(German Football Association) Schalke 04
11	FW	Manuel Schäffler	6 February 1989 (aged 20)			(German Football Association) 1860 Munich
12	GK	Tom Mickel	19 April 1989 (aged 20)			(German Football Association) Hamburger SV
13	DF	Björn Kopplin	7 January 1989 (aged 20)			(German Football Association) Bayern Munich
14	FW	Dani Schahin	9 July 1989 (aged 20)			(German Football Association) Greuther Fürth
15	MF	Semih Aydilek	16 January 1989 (aged 20)			(Turkish Football Federation) Kayserispor
16	DF	Cihan Kaptan	4 March 1989 (aged 20)			(Turkish Football Federation) Bursaspor
17	DF	Patrick Funk	11 February 1990 (aged 19)			(German Football Association) VfB Stuttgart
18	FW	Tobias Kempe	27 June 1989 (aged 20)			(German Football Association) Werder Bremen
19	DF	Kai-Fabian Schulz	12 March 1990 (aged 19)			(German Football Association) Hamburger SV
20	DF	Maik Rodenberg	29 January 1989 (aged 20)			(German Football Association) Arminia Bielefeld
21	GK	Sebastian Mielitz	17 August 1989 (aged 20)			(German Football Association) Werder Bremen

=== United States ===
Head coach: (Netherlands) Thomas Rongen

No.	Pos.	Player	Date of birth (age)	Caps	Goals	Club
1	GK	**Sean Johnson**	31 May 1989 (aged 20)			(United States Soccer Federation) University of Central Florida
2	DF	**Gale Agbossoumonde**	17 November 1991 (aged 17)			(United States Soccer Federation) Miami FC
3	DF	Dillon Powers	14 February 1991 (aged 18)			(United States Soccer Federation) University of Notre Dame
4	DF	Sheanon Williams	17 March 1990 (aged 19)			(United States Soccer Federation) Carolina Dynamo
5	MF	Danny Cruz	3 January 1990 (aged 19)			(United States Soccer Federation) Houston Dynamo
6	DF	Kyle Davies (c)	11 April 1989 (aged 20)			(United States Soccer Federation) FC Dallas
7	FW	**Tony Taylor**	13 July 1989 (aged 20)			(United States Soccer Federation) Jacksonville University
8	MF	Jared Jeffrey	14 June 1990 (aged 19)			(Royal Belgian Football Association) Club Brugge
9	FW	Peri Marošević	5 May 1989 (aged 20)			(United States Soccer Federation) FC Dallas
10	MF	Dilly Duka	15 September 1989 (aged 20)			(United States Soccer Federation) Rutgers University
11	MF	**Mix Diskerud**	2 October 1990 (aged 18)			(Norwegian Football Federation) Stabæk
12	DF	Aaron Maund	19 September 1990 (aged 19)			(United States Soccer Federation) University of Notre Dame
13	GK	Brian Perk	21 July 1989 (aged 20)			(United States Soccer Federation) UCLA
14	MF	**Gerson Mayen**	9 February 1989 (aged 20)			(United States Soccer Federation) Chivas USA
15	MF	Brian Ownby	16 July 1990 (aged 19)			(United States Soccer Federation) University of Virginia
16	DF	**Ike Opara**	21 February 1989 (aged 20)			(United States Soccer Federation) Wake Forest University
17	MF	Bryan Arguez	13 January 1989 (aged 20)			(German Football Association) Hertha BSC
18	GK	Josh Lambo	19 November 1990 (aged 18)			(United States Soccer Federation) FC Dallas
19	MF	**Jorge Villafaña**	16 September 1989 (aged 20)			(United States Soccer Federation) Chivas USA
20	FW	**Brek Shea**	28 February 1990 (aged 19)			(United States Soccer Federation) FC Dallas
21	MF	Michael Stephens	3 April 1989 (aged 20)			(United States Soccer Federation) UCLA

== Group D ==
=== England ===
Head coach: (England) Brian Eastick

No.	Pos.	Player	Date of birth (age)	Caps	Goals	Club
1	GK	Jason Steele	18 August 1990 (aged 19)			(The Football Association) Middlesbrough
2	DF	**Kieran Trippier**	19 September 1990 (aged 19)			(The Football Association) Manchester City
3	DF	Jordan Parkes	26 July 1989 (aged 20)			(The Football Association) Watford
4	MF	Adam Clayton	14 January 1989 (aged 20)			(The Football Association) Manchester City
5	DF	**Martin Kelly**	27 April 1990 (aged 19)			(The Football Association) Liverpool
6	DF	Ben Mee	3 November 1989 (aged 19)			(The Football Association) Manchester City
7	FW	**Febian Brandy**	4 February 1989 (aged 20)			(The Football Association) Manchester United
8	MF	Josh Walker (c)	21 February 1989 (aged 20)			(The Football Association) Middlesbrough
9	FW	Alex Nimely	5 November 1991 (aged 17)			(The Football Association) Manchester City
10	MF	Michael Woods	6 April 1990 (aged 19)			(The Football Association) Chelsea
11	MF	Paul Marshall	9 July 1989 (aged 20)			(The Football Association) Manchester City
12	MF	Matty James	22 July 1991 (aged 18)			(The Football Association) Manchester United
13	GK	Mark Oxley	2 June 1990 (aged 19)			(The Football Association) Hull City
14	DF	**Matthew Briggs**	9 March 1991 (aged 18)			(The Football Association) Fulham
15	DF	**Gavin Hoyte**	6 June 1990 (aged 19)			(The Football Association) Arsenal
16	DF	Seth Nana Twumasi	15 May 1990 (aged 19)			(The Football Association) Chelsea
17	FW	Jon Obika	12 September 1990 (aged 19)			(The Football Association) Tottenham Hotspur
18	FW	Sam Baldock	15 March 1989 (aged 20)			(The Football Association) Milton Keynes Dons
19	MF	Gary Gardner	29 June 1992 (aged 17)			(The Football Association) Aston Villa
20	MF	Andrew Tutte	21 September 1990 (aged 19)			(The Football Association) Manchester City
21	GK	Elliot Parish	20 May 1990 (aged 19)			(The Football Association) Aston Villa

=== Ghana ===
Head coach: (Ghana) Sellas Tetteh

No.	Pos.	Player	Date of birth (age)	Caps	Goals	Club
1	GK	**Daniel Agyei**	10 November 1989 (aged 19)			(Ghana Football Association) Liberty
2	DF	**Samuel Inkoom**	1 June 1989 (aged 20)			(Swiss Football Association) Basel
3	MF	**Gladson Awako**	31 December 1990 (aged 18)			(Ghana Football Association) Heart of Lions
4	DF	**Jonathan Mensah**	13 July 1990 (aged 19)			(South African Football Association) Free State Stars
5	DF	Daniel Addo	3 September 1989 (aged 20)			(Ghana Football Association) King Faisal
6	DF	**David Addy**	21 February 1990 (aged 19)			(Danish Football Association) Randers
7	FW	Abeiku Quansah	2 November 1990 (aged 18)			(French Football Federation) Nice
8	MF	**Emmanuel Agyemang-Badu**	2 December 1990 (aged 18)			(Italian Football Federation) Udinese
9	MF	**Agyemang Opoku**	7 June 1989 (aged 20)			(Qatar Football Association) Al-Sadd
10	FW	**André Ayew** (c)	17 December 1989 (aged 19)			(French Football Federation) Marseille
11	FW	Latif Salifu	1 August 1990 (aged 19)			(Ghana Football Association) Liberty
12	DF	Ghandi Kassenu	9 August 1989 (aged 20)			(Ghana Football Association) Liberty
13	MF	**Mohammed Rabiu**	31 December 1989 (aged 19)			(Ghana Football Association) Liberty
14	DF	**Daniel Opare**	18 October 1990 (aged 18)			(Royal Spanish Football Federation) Real Madrid
15	DF	Philip Boampong	1 January 1990 (aged 19)			(Ghana Football Association) Arsenal
16	GK	Robert Dabuo	10 November 1990 (aged 18)			(Ghana Football Association) Wa All Stars
17	DF	John Benson	27 August 1991 (aged 18)			(Qatar Football Association) ASPIRE
18	FW	**Ransford Osei**	5 December 1990 (aged 18)			(Israel Football Association) Maccabi Haifa
19	DF	**Bright Addae**	19 December 1992 (aged 16)			(Ghana Football Association) Wa All Stars
20	FW	**Dominic Adiyiah**	29 November 1989 (aged 19)			(Norwegian Football Federation) Fredrikstad
21	GK	Joseph Addo	2 November 1990 (aged 18)			(Ghana Football Association) Sekondi Hasaacas

=== Uruguay ===
Head coach: (Uruguay) Diego Aguirre

No.	Pos.	Player	Date of birth (age)	Caps	Goals	Club
1	GK	Nicola Pérez	5 February 1990 (aged 19)			(Uruguayan Football Association) Nacional
2	DF	Robert Herrera	1 March 1989 (aged 20)			(Uruguayan Football Association) Defensor Sporting
3	DF	Marcelo Silva	21 March 1989 (aged 20)			(Uruguayan Football Association) Danubio
4	DF	Adrián Gunino	3 February 1989 (aged 20)			(Argentine Football Association) Boca Juniors
5	DF	Diego Rodríguez	4 September 1989 (aged 20)			(Uruguayan Football Association) Defensor Sporting
6	DF	Leandro Cabrera	17 June 1991 (aged 18)			(Royal Spanish Football Federation) Atlético Madrid
7	MF	Tabaré Viudez	8 September 1989 (aged 20)			(Uruguayan Football Association) Defensor Sporting
8	MF	Maximiliano Calzada	21 April 1990 (aged 19)			(Uruguayan Football Association) Nacional
9	FW	Jonathan Charquero	21 February 1989 (aged 20)			(Uruguayan Football Association) Wanderers
10	MF	**Gastón Ramírez**	2 December 1990 (aged 18)			(Uruguayan Football Association) Peñarol
11	FW	**Abel Hernández**	8 August 1990 (aged 19)			(Italian Football Federation) Palermo
12	GK	Martín Rodríguez	20 September 1989 (aged 20)			(Uruguayan Football Association) Wanderers
13	DF	**Matías Aguirregaray**	1 April 1989 (aged 20)			(Uruguayan Football Association) Peñarol
14	MF	**Nicolás Lodeiro** (c)	21 March 1989 (aged 20)			(Uruguayan Football Association) Nacional
15	MF	Mauricio Pereyra	15 March 1990 (aged 19)			(Uruguayan Football Association) Nacional
16	DF	Rodrigo Mieres	19 April 1989 (aged 20)			(Uruguayan Football Association) Defensor Sporting
17	FW	**Jonathan Urretaviscaya**	19 March 1990 (aged 19)			(Portuguese Football Federation) Benfica
18	MF	Matías Mirabaje	6 March 1989 (aged 20)			(Uruguayan Football Association) Racing Club
19	DF	**Sebastián Coates**	7 October 1990 (aged 18)			(Uruguayan Football Association) Nacional
20	FW	Santiago García	14 September 1990 (aged 19)			(Uruguayan Football Association) Nacional
21	GK	**Martín Campaña**	29 May 1989 (aged 20)			(Uruguayan Football Association) Cerro Largo

=== Uzbekistan ===
Head coach: (Uzbekistan) Akhmadjon Ubaydullaev

No.	Pos.	Player	Date of birth (age)	Caps	Goals	Club
1	GK	Mukhiddin Khudoyorov	5 November 1990 (aged 18)			(Uzbekistan Football Association) Bunyodkor
2	DF	Sarvar Otabayev	12 August 1989 (aged 20)			(Uzbekistan Football Association) Qizilqum Zarafshon
3	DF	Kamoliddin Tadjibaev	19 January 1990 (aged 19)			(Uzbekistan Football Association) Bunyodkor
4	DF	**Sherzod Azamov**	14 January 1990 (aged 19)			(Uzbekistan Football Association) Nasaf Qarshi
5	DF	Dilyorbek Irmatov	30 April 1989 (aged 20)			(Uzbekistan Football Association) Neftchi Farg'ona
6	MF	Sunnatilla Mamadaliyev	28 August 1989 (aged 20)			(Uzbekistan Football Association) Qizilqum Zarafshon
7	DF	Gulom Urunov	7 June 1989 (aged 20)			(Uzbekistan Football Association) Pakhtakor Tashkent
8	MF	**Sherzod Karimov** (c)	26 January 1989 (aged 20)			(Uzbekistan Football Association) Pakhtakor Tashkent
9	FW	**Kenja Turaev**	1 March 1989 (aged 20)			(Uzbekistan Football Association) Nasaf Qarshi
10	FW	**Sanat Shikhov**	28 December 1989 (aged 19)			(Uzbekistan Football Association) Pakhtakor Tashkent
11	FW	Davron Mirzaev	8 February 1989 (aged 20)			(Russian Football Union) Rubin Kazan
12	GK	Sanjar Kuvvatov	8 January 1990 (aged 19)			(Uzbekistan Football Association) Mash'al Mubarek
13	MF	Doston Abdurahmonov	5 May 1990 (aged 19)			(Uzbekistan Football Association) Olmaliq
14	FW	**Ivan Nagaev**	3 July 1989 (aged 20)			(Uzbekistan Football Association) Metalourg Bekabad
15	MF	**Sardor Mirzaev**	21 March 1991 (aged 18)			(Uzbekistan Football Association) Neftchi Farg'ona
16	FW	**Oybek Kilichev**	17 January 1989 (aged 20)			(Uzbekistan Football Association) Pakhtakor Tashkent
17	DF	Murod Khalmuhamedov	23 December 1990 (aged 18)			(Uzbekistan Football Association) Pakhtakor Tashkent
18	MF	**Fozil Musaev**	2 January 1989 (aged 20)			(Uzbekistan Football Association) Mash'al Mubarek
19	MF	**Jasur Hasanov**	24 July 1989 (aged 20)			(Uzbekistan Football Association) Bukhara
20	DF	**Islom Tukhtakhujaev**	30 October 1989 (aged 19)			(Uzbekistan Football Association) Neftchi Farg'ona
21	GK	Doniyorjon Usmonov	23 June 1989 (aged 20)			(Uzbekistan Football Association) Neftchi Farg'ona

== Group E ==
=== Australia ===
Head coach: (Netherlands) Jan Versleijen

No.	Pos.	Player	Date of birth (age)	Caps	Goals	Club
1	GK	**Andrew Redmayne**	13 January 1989 (aged 20)			(Football Australia) Central Coast Mariners
2	DF	**Daniel Mullen**	26 October 1989 (aged 19)			(Football Australia) Adelaide United
3	DF	**Luke DeVere**	5 November 1989 (aged 19)			(Football Australia) Brisbane Roar
4	DF	**Ryan McGowan**	15 August 1989 (aged 20)			(Scottish Football Association) Heart of Midlothian
5	DF	**Matthew Jurman**	8 December 1989 (aged 19)			(Football Australia) Sydney FC
6	MF	**James Holland** (c)	15 May 1989 (aged 20)			(Royal Dutch Football Association) AZ
7	MF	Tahj Minniecon	13 February 1989 (aged 20)			(Football Australia) Gold Coast United
8	MF	**Aaron Mooy**	15 September 1990 (aged 19)			(The Football Association) Bolton Wanderers
9	FW	Jason Hoffman	28 January 1989 (aged 20)			(Football Australia) Newcastle United Jets
10	MF	**Mitch Nichols**	1 May 1989 (aged 20)			(Football Australia) Brisbane Roar
11	MF	**Tommy Oar**	10 December 1991 (aged 17)			(Football Australia) Brisbane Roar
12	FW	Nathan Elasi	18 November 1989 (aged 19)			(Football Australia) Melbourne Victory
13	MF	**Chris Herd**	4 April 1989 (aged 20)			(The Football Association) Aston Villa
14	FW	Kofi Danning	2 March 1991 (aged 18)			(Football Australia) Sydney FC
15	DF	Sam Munro	23 November 1990 (aged 18)			(Football Australia) Sydney FC
16	MF	Ben Kantarovski	20 January 1992 (aged 17)			(Football Australia) Newcastle United Jets
17	MF	**Rhyan Grant**	26 February 1991 (aged 18)			(Football Australia) Sydney FC
18	GK	Dean Bouzanis	2 October 1990 (aged 18)			(The Football Association) Liverpool
19	FW	Sean Rooney	1 March 1989 (aged 20)			(Football Australia) Newcastle United Jets
20	DF	Sam Gallagher	5 May 1991 (aged 18)			(Football Australia) Sydney FC
21	GK	Alex Cisak	19 May 1989 (aged 20)			(The Football Association) Leicester City

=== Brazil ===
Head coach: (Brazil) Rogério Lourenço

No.	Pos.	Player	Date of birth (age)	Caps	Goals	Club
1	GK	Rafael Pires	23 June 1989 (aged 20)			(Brazilian Football Confederation) Cruzeiro
2	DF	Douglas	6 August 1990 (aged 19)			(Brazilian Football Confederation) Goiás
3	DF	Dalton	5 February 1990 (aged 19)			(Brazilian Football Confederation) Fluminense
4	DF	**Rafael Tolói**	10 October 1990 (aged 18)			(Brazilian Football Confederation) Goiás
5	MF	Renan Foguinho	9 October 1989 (aged 19)			(Brazilian Football Confederation) Atlético Paranaense
6	DF	Diogo	30 December 1989 (aged 19)			(Brazilian Football Confederation) São Paulo
7	MF	Alex Teixeira	6 January 1990 (aged 19)			(Brazilian Football Confederation) Vasco da Gama
8	MF	Maylson	6 March 1989 (aged 20)			(Brazilian Football Confederation) Grêmio
9	FW	Alan Kardec	12 January 1989 (aged 20)			(Brazilian Football Confederation) Vasco da Gama
10	MF	**Giuliano** (c)	31 May 1990 (aged 19)			(Brazilian Football Confederation) Internacional
11	MF	**Ganso**	12 October 1989 (aged 19)			(Brazilian Football Confederation) Santos
12	GK	Renan Ribeiro	23 March 1990 (aged 19)			(Brazilian Football Confederation) Atlético Mineiro
13	MF	**Douglas Costa**	14 September 1990 (aged 19)			(Brazilian Football Confederation) Grêmio
14	DF	Fabrício	20 February 1990 (aged 19)			(Brazilian Football Confederation) Flamengo
15	DF	Wellington Júnior	26 June 1989 (aged 20)			(Brazilian Football Confederation) Botafogo
16	DF	Bruno Bertucci	27 April 1990 (aged 19)			(Brazilian Football Confederation) Corinthians
17	MF	**Souza**	11 February 1989 (aged 20)			(Brazilian Football Confederation) Vasco da Gama
18	MF	Boquita	7 April 1990 (aged 19)			(Brazilian Football Confederation) Corinthians
19	FW	Maicon	18 February 1990 (aged 19)			(Brazilian Football Confederation) Fluminense
20	FW	Ciro	18 April 1989 (aged 20)			(Brazilian Football Confederation) Sport
21	GK	Saulo	2 April 1989 (aged 20)			(Brazilian Football Confederation) Sport

=== Costa Rica ===
Head coach: (Costa Rica) Rónald González

No.	Pos.	Player	Date of birth (age)	Caps	Goals	Club
1	GK	**Esteban Alvarado**	28 April 1989 (aged 20)			(Costa Rican Football Federation) Saprissa
2	DF	**José Mena** (c)	2 February 1989 (aged 20)			(Costa Rican Football Federation) Saprissa
3	DF	**Roy Smith**	19 April 1990 (aged 19)			(Costa Rican Football Federation) Brujas
4	DF	Kenner Gutiérrez	9 June 1989 (aged 20)			(Costa Rican Football Federation) Alajuelense
5	DF	Derrick Johnson	28 July 1989 (aged 20)			(Costa Rican Football Federation) Brujas
6	DF	Ricardo Blanco	12 May 1989 (aged 20)			(Costa Rican Football Federation) Saprissa
7	FW	**Marco Ureña**	5 March 1990 (aged 19)			(Costa Rican Football Federation) Alajuelense
8	MF	**David Guzmán**	18 February 1990 (aged 19)			(Costa Rican Football Federation) Saprissa
9	FW	Jorge Alejandro Castro	11 September 1990 (aged 19)			(Costa Rican Football Federation) Saprissa
10	MF	**Diego Estrada**	25 May 1989 (aged 20)			(Costa Rican Football Federation) Alajuelense
11	FW	**Diego Madrigal**	19 March 1989 (aged 20)			(Costa Rican Football Federation) Universidad de Costa Rica
12	DF	**Cristian Gamboa**	24 October 1989 (aged 19)			(Costa Rican Football Federation) Liberia
13	MF	**Allen Guevara**	16 April 1989 (aged 20)			(Costa Rican Football Federation) Liberia
14	DF	**Bryan Oviedo**	18 February 1990 (aged 19)			(Costa Rican Football Federation) Saprissa
15	DF	**Pedro Leal**	31 January 1989 (aged 20)			(Costa Rican Football Federation) Puntarenas
16	MF	Carlos Hernández	29 August 1989 (aged 20)			(Costa Rican Football Federation) Herediano
17	FW	**Josué Martínez**	25 March 1990 (aged 19)			(Costa Rican Football Federation) Saprissa
18	GK	Minor Álvarez	14 November 1989 (aged 19)			(Costa Rican Football Federation) Saprissa
19	MF	José Daniel Varela	30 April 1990 (aged 19)			(Costa Rican Football Federation) Brujas
20	MF	Esteban Luna	5 January 1990 (aged 19)			(Costa Rican Football Federation) Saprissa
21	GK	Danny Carvajal	8 January 1989 (aged 20)			(Costa Rican Football Federation) Brujas

=== Czech Republic ===
Head coach: (Czech Republic) Jakub Dovalil

No.	Pos.	Player	Date of birth (age)	Caps	Goals	Club
1	GK	**Tomáš Vaclík**	29 March 1989 (aged 20)			(Football Association of the Czech Republic) Vítkovice
2	DF	Jan Lecjaks	9 August 1990 (aged 19)			(Football Association of the Czech Republic) Viktoria Plzeň
3	DF	Jan Hošek	1 April 1989 (aged 20)			(Football Association of the Czech Republic) Slavia Prague
4	DF	**Ondřej Mazuch** (c)	15 March 1989 (aged 20)			(Italian Football Federation) Fiorentina
5	DF	**Ondřej Čelůstka**	18 June 1989 (aged 20)			(Football Association of the Czech Republic) Slavia Prague
6	MF	**Lukáš Vácha**	13 May 1989 (aged 20)			(Football Association of the Czech Republic) Slavia Prague
7	FW	Jan Chramosta	12 October 1990 (aged 18)			(Football Association of the Czech Republic) Mladá Boleslav
8	MF	**Jan Morávek**	1 November 1989 (aged 19)			(German Football Association) Schalke 04
9	FW	**Michael Rabušic**	17 September 1989 (aged 20)			(Football Association of the Czech Republic) Brno
10	FW	**Tomáš Pekhart**	26 May 1989 (aged 20)			(The Football Association) Tottenham Hotspur
11	FW	Jan Vošahlík	8 March 1989 (aged 20)			(Football Association of the Czech Republic) Jablonec
12	MF	**Lukáš Mareček**	17 April 1990 (aged 19)			(Football Association of the Czech Republic) Brno
13	MF	Martin Zeman	28 March 1989 (aged 20)			(Football Association of the Czech Republic) Sparta Prague
14	DF	**Radim Řezník**	20 January 1989 (aged 20)			(Football Association of the Czech Republic) Baník Ostrava
15	DF	Jakub Heidenreich	27 April 1989 (aged 20)			(Football Association of the Czech Republic) Sigma Olomouc
16	GK	Jan Šebek	31 March 1991 (aged 18)			(The Football Association) Chelsea
17	MF	Petr Wojnar	12 January 1989 (aged 20)			(Football Association of the Czech Republic) Baník Ostrava
18	MF	Tomáš Fabián	10 September 1989 (aged 20)			(Football Association of the Czech Republic) Mladá Boleslav
19	DF	Pavel Dreksa	17 September 1989 (aged 20)			(Football Association of the Czech Republic) Sigma Olomouc
20	MF	Antonín Fantiš	15 April 1992 (aged 17)			(Football Association of the Czech Republic) Příbram
21	GK	Jakub Jakubov	1 February 1989 (aged 20)			(Football Association of the Czech Republic) Dukla Prague

== Group F ==
=== United Arab Emirates ===
Head coach: (United Arab Emirates) Mahdi Ali

No.	Pos.	Player	Date of birth (age)	Caps	Goals	Club
1	GK	**Yousif Abdelrahman**	4 March 1989 (aged 20)			(United Arab Emirates Football Association) Al Ain
2	DF	Saad Surour	19 July 1990 (aged 19)			(United Arab Emirates Football Association) Al-Ahli
3	MF	Saoud Saeed	28 June 1990 (aged 19)			(United Arab Emirates Football Association) Al Wasl
4	DF	Mohammed Marzooq	23 January 1989 (aged 20)			(United Arab Emirates Football Association) Al-Shabab
5	MF	**Amer Abdulrahman**	3 July 1989 (aged 20)			(United Arab Emirates Football Association) Bani Yas
6	DF	Mohammed Jamal	22 July 1989 (aged 20)			(United Arab Emirates Football Association) Al Wasl
7	FW	**Ali Mabkhout**	5 October 1990 (aged 18)			(United Arab Emirates Football Association) Al-Jazira
8	DF	**Hamdan Al-Kamali** (c)	2 May 1989 (aged 20)			(United Arab Emirates Football Association) Al-Wahda
9	FW	**Ahmed Ali**	28 January 1990 (aged 19)			(United Arab Emirates Football Association) Al-Wahda
10	MF	**Theyab Awana**	6 July 1990 (aged 19)			(United Arab Emirates Football Association) Bani Yas
11	FW	**Ahmed Khalil**	8 June 1991 (aged 18)			(United Arab Emirates Football Association) Al-Ahli
12	MF	**Habib Al Fardan**	11 November 1990 (aged 18)			(United Arab Emirates Football Association) Al-Nasr
13	GK	Ahmed Mahmoud	30 March 1989 (aged 20)			(United Arab Emirates Football Association) Al-Shabab
14	DF	**Abdelaziz Sanqour**	7 May 1989 (aged 20)			(United Arab Emirates Football Association) Al-Sharjah
15	FW	**Mahir Jasem**	22 January 1989 (aged 20)			(United Arab Emirates Football Association) Al Wasl
16	DF	Mohammed Fayez	6 October 1989 (aged 19)			(United Arab Emirates Football Association) Al Ain
17	GK	Saif Yousef	10 January 1989 (aged 20)			(United Arab Emirates Football Association) Al-Ahli
18	MF	**Mohamed Fawzi**	22 February 1990 (aged 19)			(United Arab Emirates Football Association) Al-Ahli
19	DF	**Mohamed Ahmed**	16 April 1989 (aged 20)			(United Arab Emirates Football Association) Al-Shabab
20	DF	**Abdulaziz Haikal**	10 September 1990 (aged 19)			(United Arab Emirates Football Association) Al-Shabab
21	MF	Sultan Bargash	18 January 1989 (aged 20)			(United Arab Emirates Football Association) Al-Jazira

=== Honduras ===
Head coach: (Honduras) Emilio Umanzor

No.	Pos.	Player	Date of birth (age)	Caps	Goals	Club
1	GK	Francisco Reyes	7 February 1990 (aged 19)			(National Autonomous Federation of Football of Honduras) Olimpia
2	DF	Nahún Solís	18 January 1989 (aged 20)			(National Autonomous Federation of Football of Honduras) Platense
3	DF	Ángel Castro	8 September 1990 (aged 19)			(National Autonomous Federation of Football of Honduras) Olimpia
4	DF	**Wilmer Crisanto**	19 September 1989 (aged 20)			(National Autonomous Federation of Football of Honduras) Victoria
5	DF	Israel Fonseca	27 May 1990 (aged 19)			(National Autonomous Federation of Football of Honduras) Olimpia
6	MF	Esdras Padilla	4 September 1989 (aged 20)			(National Autonomous Federation of Football of Honduras) Motagua
7	MF	**Mario Martínez** (c)	30 July 1989 (aged 20)			(Norwegian Football Federation) Vålerenga
8	MF	Reinieri Mayorquín	13 July 1989 (aged 20)			(Norwegian Football Federation) Aalesunds
9	FW	**Cristian Martínez**	8 September 1990 (aged 19)			(National Autonomous Federation of Football of Honduras) Real España
10	FW	**Erick Andino**	21 July 1989 (aged 20)			(National Autonomous Federation of Football of Honduras) Olimpia
11	FW	**Roger Rojas**	9 June 1990 (aged 19)			(The Football Association) Wigan Athletic
12	GK	Marlon Licona	9 February 1991 (aged 18)			(National Autonomous Federation of Football of Honduras) Motagua
13	MF	Ronald Martínez Ponce	26 July 1990 (aged 19)			(National Autonomous Federation of Football of Honduras) Motagua
14	DF	**Gerson Rodas**	6 July 1990 (aged 19)			(National Autonomous Federation of Football of Honduras) Real España
15	MF	**Arnold Peralta**	29 March 1989 (aged 20)			(National Autonomous Federation of Football of Honduras) Vida
16	DF	**Johnny Leverón**	7 February 1990 (aged 19)			(National Autonomous Federation of Football of Honduras) Motagua
17	MF	Bonel Avila	29 March 1989 (aged 20)			(National Autonomous Federation of Football of Honduras) Marathón
18	MF	Julio Ocampo	12 February 1990 (aged 19)			(National Autonomous Federation of Football of Honduras) Real Juventud
19	FW	Víctor Ortiz	21 May 1990 (aged 19)			(National Autonomous Federation of Football of Honduras) Victoria
20	MF	**Alfredo Mejía**	3 April 1990 (aged 19)			(National Autonomous Federation of Football of Honduras) Real España
21	GK	**José Mendoza**	21 July 1989 (aged 20)			(National Autonomous Federation of Football of Honduras) Platense

=== Hungary ===
Head coach: (Hungary) Sándor Egervári

No.	Pos.	Player	Date of birth (age)	Caps	Goals	Club
1	GK	**Péter Gulácsi**	6 May 1990 (aged 19)			(The Football Association) Liverpool
2	DF	**János Szabó**	11 July 1989 (aged 20)			(Hungarian Football Federation) Paks
3	MF	Péter Takács	25 January 1990 (aged 19)			(Hungarian Football Federation) Diósgyőr
4	MF	Máté Kiss	30 April 1991 (aged 18)			(Hungarian Football Federation) Győri ETO
5	DF	**András Debreceni**	21 April 1989 (aged 20)			(Hungarian Football Federation) Honvéd
6	DF	**Zsolt Korcsmár**	9 January 1989 (aged 20)			(Hungarian Football Federation) Újpest
7	MF	**Vladimir Koman** (c)	16 March 1989 (aged 20)			(Italian Football Federation) Sampdoria (on loan to Bari)
8	FW	András Simon	30 March 1990 (aged 19)			(The Football Association) Liverpool
9	FW	**Krisztián Németh**	5 January 1989 (aged 20)			(The Football Association) Liverpool
10	MF	Ádám Dudás	12 February 1989 (aged 20)			(Hungarian Football Federation) Győri ETO
11	MF	**Roland Varga**	23 January 1990 (aged 19)			(Italian Football Federation) Brescia
12	GK	**Balázs Megyeri**	31 March 1990 (aged 19)			(Hungarian Football Federation) Ferencváros
13	DF	Adrián Szekeres	21 April 1989 (aged 20)			(Hungarian Football Federation) MTK
14	DF	Ádám Présinger	26 January 1989 (aged 20)			(Hungarian Football Federation) Videoton
15	DF	Bence Zámbó	17 August 1989 (aged 20)			(Hungarian Football Federation) Győri ETO
16	MF	**Ádám Simon**	30 March 1990 (aged 19)			(Hungarian Football Federation) MTK (on loan to Haladás)
17	MF	András Gosztonyi	7 November 1990 (aged 18)			(Hungarian Football Federation) MTK
18	FW	Ádám Balajti	7 March 1991 (aged 18)			(Hungarian Football Federation) Diósgyőr
19	FW	**Márkó Futács**	22 February 1990 (aged 19)			(German Football Association) Werder Bremen
20	MF	Bence Tóth	27 July 1989 (aged 20)			(Hungarian Football Federation) Ferencváros
21	GK	**Ádám Kovácsik**	4 April 1991 (aged 18)			(Italian Football Federation) Reggina

=== South Africa ===
Head coach: (South Africa) Serame Letsoaka

No.	Pos.	Player	Date of birth (age)	Caps	Goals	Club
1	GK	**Darren Keet**	5 August 1989 (aged 20)			(South African Football Association) Bidvest Wits
2	DF	**Sibusiso Khumalo**	8 September 1989 (aged 20)			(South African Football Association) Moroka Swallows
3	DF	Sibusiso Mxoyana	14 April 1989 (aged 20)			(South African Football Association) Orlando Pirates
4	DF	**Thulani Hlatshwayo**	18 December 1989 (aged 19)			(South African Football Association) Ajax Cape Town
5	DF	Ramahlwe Mphahlele (c)	1 February 1990 (aged 19)			(South African Football Association) Moroka Swallows
6	MF	**Kamohelo Mokotjo**	11 March 1991 (aged 18)			(Royal Dutch Football Association) Feyenoord
7	MF	**Daylon Claasen**	28 January 1990 (aged 19)			(Royal Dutch Football Association) Ajax
8	MF	Sameehg Doutie	31 May 1989 (aged 20)			(South African Football Association) Ajax Cape Town
9	FW	Thulani Ngcepe	19 January 1990 (aged 19)			(South African Football Association) Supersport United
10	MF	**Thulani Serero**	11 April 1990 (aged 19)			(South African Football Association) Ajax Cape Town
11	MF	Philani Khwela	22 August 1991 (aged 18)			(Royal Dutch Football Association) Feyenoord
12	MF	**Mandla Masango**	18 July 1989 (aged 20)			(South African Football Association) Kaizer Chiefs
13	DF	**Gladwin Shitolo**	10 August 1989 (aged 20)			(South African Football Association) Jomo Cosmos
14	DF	Phumelele Bhengu	19 November 1989 (aged 19)			(South African Football Association) Moroka Swallows
15	DF	**Andile Jali**	10 April 1990 (aged 19)			(South African Football Association) Orlando Pirates
16	GK	Thela Ngobeni	4 February 1989 (aged 20)			(South African Football Association) Kaizer Chiefs
17	FW	**George Maluleka**	7 January 1989 (aged 20)			(South African Football Association) Ajax Cape Town
18	FW	**Kermit Erasmus**	8 July 1990 (aged 19)			(Royal Dutch Football Association) Feyenoord
19	DF	Collen Zulu	1 January 1991 (aged 18)			(South African Football Association) Supersport United
20	FW	**Dino Ndlovu**	15 February 1990 (aged 19)			(South African Football Association) Platinum Stars
21	GK	Tawfeeq Salie	21 July 1991 (aged 18)			(South African Football Association) Ajax Cape Town
