= 2009 African Youth Championship squads =

== Cameroon ==
1. Joseph Asong (Union Sportivo)
2. Haman Daouda (Coton Sport)
3. Sylvain Abad (Cercle Sportif Yaounde)
4. Banana Yaya (Achille Fc)
5. Enow Juvette Tabot (Tiko United)
6. Charley Fomen (Panthere Du Nde)
7. Cedric N'Koum (Paris St.)
8. Yannick Émile Kamto Kamgang (Union De Douala)
9. Brice Owona (Coton Sport)
10. Jacques Zoua (Coton Sport)
11. Tiko Messina (Duisburg-Germany)
12. Cédric N'Doumbé (Anderlecht-Belgium)
13. Louisse Parfait (Genoa-Italy)
14. Patrick Ekeng Ekeng (Canon Yaounde)
15. Francis Monono Evambe (Tiko United)
16. François Beyokol (Canon Yaounde)
17. Gaitan Seumou (Us Montalcin)
18. Jean-Jules Bapidi Fils (Panthere Du Nde)

== Ivory Coast ==
1. Adama Cisse (Asec Mimosas)
2. Xavier Kouassi (Sewe Sport)
3. N’Goran Katalin Comoe (Sewe Sport)
4. Troh César Hougnonhouon (Asec Mimosas)
5. Kevin Fallet (Asec Mimosas)
6. Mansou Kouakou (Stade D’Abidjan)
7. Antoine N'Gossan (Asec Mimosas)
8. Kouassi Koffi (Sewe Sport)
9. Koro Issa Kone (Herta)
10. Cyriac (Asec Mimosas)
11. Topio Coulibaly (Asec Mimosas)
12. Bakary Kone (Asec Mimosas)
13. Zie Diabaté (Dynamo Bucarest-Romania)
14. Jean Michaël Seri (Africa Sports)
15. Tiézan Ladji Koné (Asec Mimosas)
16. Yagnele Clovis Tahourou (Asec Mimosas)
17. Vamouti Diomande (Es Bingerville)
18. Hugues Zagbayou (Asec Mimosas)

== Egypt ==
1. Ahmed Adbelaty Mohamed Rashed ENPPI
2. Shehab El-Din Ahmed Al Ahly
3. Hossam Arafat Zamalek
4. Ayman Ashraf Al Ahly
5. Mohamed Bassam (El Gaish)
6. Ahmed Hegazy Ismaily
7. Bogy (Al Qanah)
8. Mohamed Abou Gabal ENPPI
9. Moaz El-Henawy Al Ahly
10. Ahmed Magdi Ghazl El-Mehalla
11. Hesham Mohamed Al Ahly
12. Islam Ramadan(Haras Hedoud)
13. Salah Soliman Ghazl El-Mehalla
14. Mohamed Mohsen (Ismaily)
15. Ahmed Shoukry Al Ahly
16. Mohamed Talaat (Ahly Dubai)
17. Mahmoud Tobah Al Ahly
18. Moustafa Youssef Abdelhamid Amin Hegab Zamalek

== Ghana ==
1. Daniel Adjei (Liberty Professionals)
2. Samuel Inkoom (Asante Kotoko)
3. Gladson Awako (Hearts Of Lions)
4. Jonathan Mensah (Free State Stars, S.A.)
5. Daniel Addo (King Faisal F.C.)
6. David Addy (Randers F.C.-Denmark)
7. Enoch Kofi Adu (Ogc Nice-France)
8. Emmanuel Agyemang-Badu (Asante Kotoko)
9. Latif Salifu (Liberty Professionals)
10. André Ayew (Lorient F.C.-France)
11. Dominic Adiyiah (Fredrikstad FC-Norway)
12. Ghandi Kassenu (Liberty Professionals)
13. Godfred Rockson Asiamah (Hearts Of Lions)
14. Isaac Donkor (Liberty Professionals)
15. Philip Boampong (Berekum Arsanals)
16. Joseph Addo (Hearts Of Lions)
17. Abeiku Quansah (Ogc Nice-France)
18. Ransford Osei (Maccabi Haifa Israel)

== Mali ==
1. Ibrahim Mounkoro (Asko)
2. Drissa Fane (Asko)
3. Cheick Oumar Ballo (Asko)
4. Samba Sow (R.C.Lens-France)
5. Boubacar Sylla (Stade Malien)
6. Souleymane Diabate (Jomo Cosmos)
7. Aboubacar Magassa (Csk)
8. Ousmane Diarra (Asko)
9. Morimakan Koita (Cob)
10. Malamine Mariko (Csd)
11. Yacouba Diarra (Ess)
12. Boubacar Bangoura (Est)
13. Adama Traoré (PSG-France)
14. Boubacar Sissoko (Asb)
15. Moussa Guindo (Asec)
16. Adama Keita (Asko)
17. Moctar Fall (11Createurs)
18. Seydou Simpara (Asko)

== Nigeria ==
1. Uche Okafor (Kaduna Utd)
2. Samuel Tswanya (Niger Tornadoes)
3. Okolie Chukwuka (First Bank FC)
4. Nwankwo Obiora (Wikki T.)
5. Kingsley Udoh (Akwa United FC)
6. Edet Ibok (Cd.Ath.Bal- Spain)
7. Lukman Haruna (AS Monaco-France)
8. Michael Uchebo (Enugu Rangers)
9. Macauley Chrisantus (Hamburger SV-Germany)
10. Rabiu Ibrahim (Sporting CP-Portugal)
11. Matthew Edile Origoya (Salamanca-Spain)
12. Dele Ajiboye (Wikki T.)
13. Yakubu Alfa (Helsingborg)
14. Lukman Abdulkarim (Hakoah Amidar Ramat Gan)
15. Oluwasina Abe (Sunshine)
16. Frank Temile (Dynamo Kiev-Ukraine)
17. Gbolahan Salami (Sunshine)
18. Ganiyu Oseni (CSKA Moscow-Russia)

== South Africa ==
1. Boalefa Pule (Nw Academy)
2. Sipho Nyafoza (Nw Academy)
3. Coldrin Coetzee (Platinum Stars)
4. Thulani Hlatshwayo (Ajax Cape Town)
5. Ramahlwe Mphahlele (Moroka Swallows)
6. Kamohelo Mokotjo (Supersport United)
7. Daylon Claasen (Ajax Amsterdam)
8. Michael Morton (Orlando Pirates)
9. Thulani Ngcepe (Moroka Swallows)
10. Thulani Serero (Ajax Cape Town)
11. Philani Khwela (Supersport United)
12. Mandla Masango (Kaizer Chiefs)
13. Thabang Matuka (Platinum Stars)
14. Phumelele Bhengu (Moroka Swallows)
15. Bongani Sondhlane (Kaizer Chiefs)
16. Thela Ngobeni (Kaizer Chiefs)
17. George Maluleka (Supersport United)
18. Mduduzi Nyanda (Orlando Pirates)

== Rwanda (host) ==
1. Jean-Luc Ndayishimiye (Atraco)
2. Aimable Rucogoza (Rayon Sports)
3. Annuar Kibaya (As Kigali)
4. Arafat Serugendo (Apr)
5. Michel Hitimana (Lajeunesse)
6. Jean-Claude Iranzi (Apr)
7. Jean Mugiraneza (Apr)
8. Haruna Niyonzima (Apr)
9. Elias Uzamukunda (Apr)
10. Heriman Ngoma (Apr)
11. Ernest Kwizera (Apr)
12. Yussuf Ndayishimiye (Rayon Sports)
13. Jean Bosco Ngaboyisibo (Rayon Sports)
14. Robert Muvunyi (La Jeunesse)
15. Aboubakar Nshimiyimana (Mukura)
16. Christian Twahirwa (As Kigali)
17. Eric Habimana (As Kigali)
18. Emery Mvuyekure (Electrogaz)
