= 2009 FIFA U-20 World Cup final =

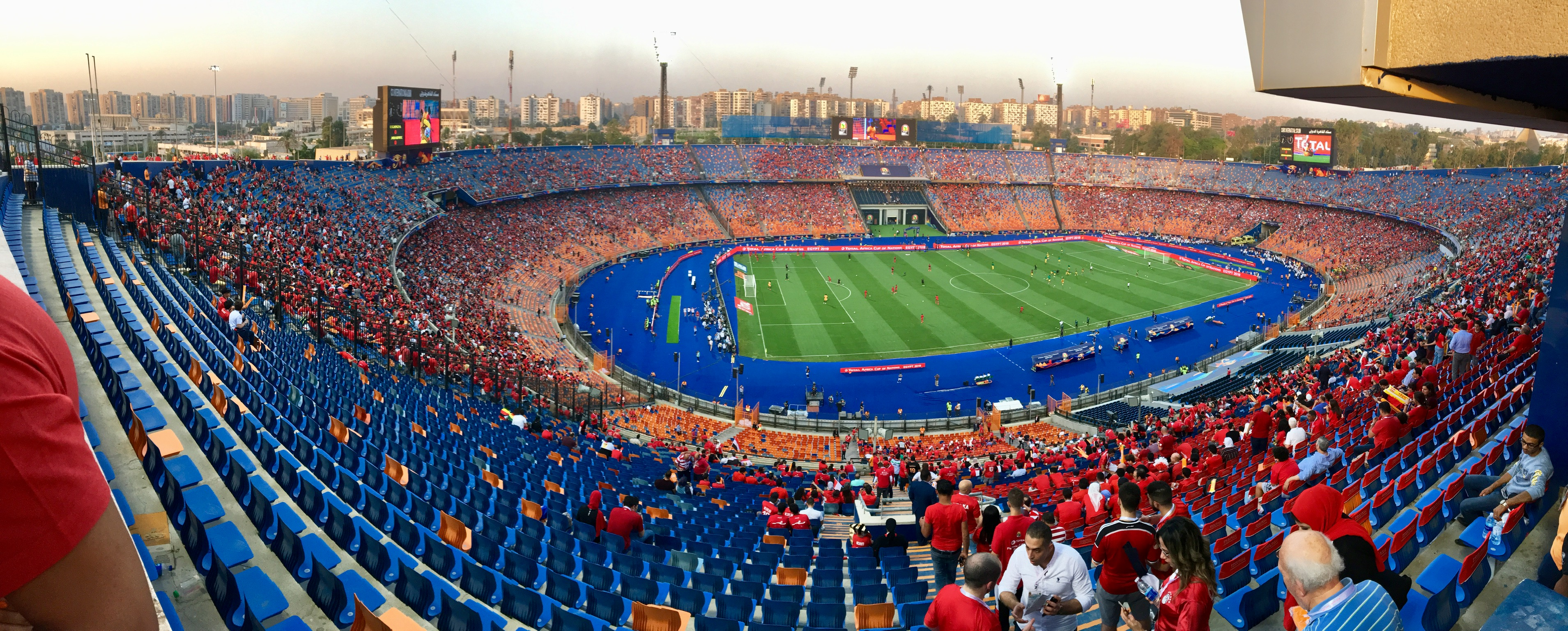
- Cairo International Stadium in 2019
- Event: 2009 FIFA U-20 World Cup
Ghana	Brazil
(Ghana)	(Brazil)
0	0
- After extra time Ghana won 4–3 on penalties
- Date: 16 October 2009
- Venue: Cairo International Stadium, Cairo
- Referee: Frank De Bleeckere (Belgium)
- Attendance: 67,000

The final match and culmination of the 2009 FIFA U-20 World Cup was played at the Cairo International Stadium in Cairo, Egypt, on 16 October 2009 and was contested between Ghana and Brazil. The match was won by Ghana 4–3 in the penalty shoot-out after the game ended in a goalless draw.

Ghana became the first African country to win a FIFA U-20 World Cup title.

== Background ==
Ghana results
Round	Opponent	Result
GS	Uzbekistan	2–1
GS	England	4–0
GS	Uruguay	2–2
R16	South Africa	2–1 (a.e.t.)
QF	South Korea	3–2
SF	Hungary	3–2

Brazil results
Round	Opponent	Result
GS	Costa Rica	5–0
GS	Czech Republic	0–0
GS	Australia	3–1
R16	Uruguay	3–1
QF	Germany	2–1 (a.e.t.)
SF	Costa Rica	1–0

Ghana had already played a final in the 2001 edition of the tournament, held in Argentina. In that final, Ghana lost 0–3 to local Argentina, which, despite being the title holders, had not qualified for the World Cup in Egypt. Brazil, on the other side, was seeking its fifth tournament in the category, having previously won the final of the 2003 FIFA World Youth Championship in the UAE.

In its group stage matches, Ghana had defeated Uzbekistan and England, drawing 2–2 in the final group game with Uruguay. In the round of 16, the Ghanaian team went to extra time to get past South Africa 2–1 in Ismailia, struggling in a hard-fought match against South Korea in the quarterfinals which ended 3–2 for the Africans. Ghana won the semi-final game with that same score, 3–2, against Hungary.

Brazil, in Group E, had crushed Costa Rica 5–0 and defeated Australia 3–1, getting a goalless draw in its match against Czechia. The knockout stage for Brazil was a 3–1 victory against Uruguay in the round of 16, a 2–1 victory over Germany after extra time in the quarter-final game, and defeating Costa Rica 1–0 in the semi-finals.

== Match and legacy ==
The final was played at Cairo International Stadium on 16 October 2009, with an attendance of over 67,000 spectators. The officials for the match consisted of a Belgian trio led by referee Frank De Bleeckere, assisted by compatriots Peter Hermans and Walter Vromans. Alberto Undiano Mallenco of Spain served as the fourth official, while Fermín Martínez, also of Spain, served as the fifth official.

De Bleeckere showed three yellow cards to the Brazilians and a red card to Ghanaian defender Daniel Addo in the 37th minute of the match. The game ended in a goalless draw after the full time of 90 minutes, ending in the same score after extra time. In the penalty shoot-out, Jonathan Mensah and Bright Addae failed the third and fourth penalty kicks for Ghana, while the Brazilians failed the third, fourth, and fifth kicks, with goalkeeper Daniel Adjei containing the penalty kick of Alex Teixeira. Midfielder Emmanuel Agyemang-Badu scored the winning penalty goal for Ghana.

The Ghanaian team of 2009 has been highly regarded by Ghanaian media. After winning the World Cup in Egypt, President John Atta Mills congratulated the players and welcomed them at Osu Castle along with Vice-President John Mahama. Mills additionally promised the team a cheque of GHS 10,000, which would be put in the form of investment for an unspecified time period. The cheques were released in January 2024, with the government writing to the Ghana Football Association to invite the players to cash them from 8 January 2025.

In September 2022, Agyemang-Badu told Adom Online that he was told not to take off his jersey when celebrating the winning penalty kick, which he nonetheless did, because his physique looked like someone older than 20 years old, adding that one of his teammates warned him that FIFA would refuse to hand over the trophy to them.

The World Cup title in 2009 propelled the Ghanaian team forward, qualifying for the 2010 FIFA World Cup in South Africa. However, after Ghana was eliminated by Uruguay in a heated quarter-final match, the national team as well as its youth squads began to plunge in their performances at CAF tournaments. In October 2019, ten years after the victory in Egypt, player André Ayew spoke with BBC Sport, saying that Ghana had "lost organisation" after 2014. He highlighted that the team had made progress until that year, subsequently failing to achieve great success. Ayew also pointed to the 2010 FIFA World Cup loss to Uruguay and that year's final against Egypt in the Africa Cup of Nations, which Ghana lost. Ayew's teammates Agyemang-Bady and David Addy concurred with his views, with Addy stating that when they won the 2009 U-20 World Cup, they did not understand how big of an achievement that was. Dominic Adiyiah won the tournament's Golden Boot and Golden Ball.

Ghana remained the only African country to win the youth title until Morocco won the final against Argentina in the 2025 FIFA U-20 World Cup edition.

== Summary ==
16 October 2009
20:00

Ghana	0–0 (a.e.t.)	Brazil
	Report
Penalties
Ayew (penalty scored); Inkoom (penalty scored); Mensah (penalty missed); Addae (penalty missed); Adiyiah (penalty scored); Badu (penalty scored)	4–3	(penalty scored) Alan Kardec; (penalty scored) Giuliano; (penalty scored) Douglas Costa; (penalty missed) Souza; (penalty missed) Maicon; (penalty missed) Teixeira

Cairo International Stadium, Cairo
Attendance: 67,814
Referee: Frank De Bleeckere (Belgium)

Ghana

Brazil

GHANA:
GK	1	Daniel Adjei
DF	2	Samuel Inkoom
DF	4	Jonathan Mensah
DF	5	Daniel Addo	(red card) 37'
DF	6	David Addy
MF	7	Abeiku Quansah		(substituted off) 107'
MF	8	Emmanuel Agyemang-Badu
MF	10	André Ayew (c)
MF	13	Mohammed Rabiu		(substituted off) 101'
FW	18	Ransford Osei		(substituted off) 65'
FW	20	Dominic Adiyiah
Substitutions:
DF	12	Ghandi Kassenu		(substituted on) 65'
DF	19	Bright Addae		(substituted on) 101'
MF	9	Agyemang Opoku		(substituted on) 107'
Manager:
Sellas Tetteh

BRAZIL:
GK	1	Rafael
DF	2	Douglas	(yellow card) 30'	(substituted off) 41'
DF	3	Dalton
DF	4	Rafael Tolói
DF	5	Renan		(substituted off) 75'
DF	6	Diogo
MF	7	Alex Teixeira	(yellow card) 27'
MF	10	Giuliano (c)
MF	11	Ganso		(substituted off) 64'
MF	17	Souza	(yellow card) 111'
FW	9	Alan Kardec
Substitutions:
DF	15	Wellington Júnior		(substituted on) 41'
MF	13	Douglas Costa		(substituted on) 64'
FW	19	Maicon		(substituted on) 75'
Manager:
Rogério Lourenço

Man of the Match:

Assistant referees:

Peter Hermans (Belgium)

Walter Vromans (Belgium)

Fourth official:

Alberto Undiano Mallenco (Spain)

Fifth official:

Fermín Martínez (Spain)
