= Mieres (disambiguation) =

Mieres is a city in Asturias, Spain.

Mieres may also refer to:

- Mieres, Girona, village and municipality in Catalonia
- Mieres del Camino, a parish in Mieres, Spain

== People with the surname ==
- Anthony Mieres, English Protestant leader and exile
- Brian Mieres (born 1995), Argentine professional footballer
- Gastón Mieres (born 1989), Uruguayan rugby union player
- Ignacio Mieres, Argentine rugby union player
- Jennifer Mieres, American cardiologist
- Malena Mieres (born 2000), Spanish footballer
- Pablo Mieres, Uruguayan politician
- Roberto Mieres, Argentine racing driver
- Rodrigo Mieres (born 1989), Uruguayan professional footballer

== See also ==
- Ramón Miérez
