= Ladan Bosso =

Nigerian football coach

Isah Ladan Bosso
Personal information
- Date of birth: 5 October 1967 (age 59)
- Place of birth: Niger State, Nigeria
- Height: 1.83 m (6 ft 0 in)

Managerial career
- Years: Team
- 2007–2009: Nigeria U-20
- 2011: Kano Pillars
- 2011–2012: Wikki Tourists F.C.
- 2012-2014: Bayelsa United
- 2014-2015: Abia Warriors
- 2015-2019: El-Kanemi Warriors
- 2020–2024: Nigeria U-20
- 2024-: Bayelsa United

Isah Ladan Bosso (born 5 October 1967) is the current head coach of Bayelsa United and a former coach of the Nigeria national under-20 football team, nicknamed the Flying Eagles. He was appointed in September 2020. He led the Nigerian team to the 2023 U-20 Africa Cup of Nations. He has often been described as Nigeria's own Sean Dyche because of his pragmatic managerial approach and emphasis on solid defensive shape. Bosso was made famous for his racism allegation against England referee Howard Webb after Nigeria's Under 20s lost to Chile at the quarter-final stage of the 2007 FIFA U-20 World Cup.

== Coaching career ==
In 2007, Ladan Bosso was appointed the head coach of Nigeria national under-20 football team. He led the team to the quarter-final stage of the 2007 FIFA U-20 World Cup. In 2009, the Bosso led under-20 team finished as runner-up in the WAFU U20 Nation Cup. He was dismissed in 2009 following a third-place finish by the Flying Eagles at the 2009 African Youth Championship and Samson Siasia was appointed as his replacement. After leaving the Flying Eagles, Bosso joined Kano Pillars as head coach in January 2011. He left the position in November 2011.

Bosso was appointed technical director by Nigerian football club Wikki Tourist in December 2011. A position he left in November 2012 to join the then-champion of Nigerian professional football league Bayelsa United. Bosso quit Bayelsa United and joined Nigeria Premier League side, Abia Warriors Football Club of Umuahia as the club's technical adviser in February 2014. In November 2015, the management of Abia Warriors decided not to renew Bosso's contract following the poor performance of the team in the 2014/2015 Nigeria Professional Football League (NPFL) season. Ladan Bosso was appointed coach of Nigeria Premier League side El Kanemi Warriors in December 2015. He took over from Kelechi Emeteole, who ensured the club were not relegated that season. In September 2020, the Nigeria Football Federation (NFF) appointed Bosso as head coach of Nigeria national under-20 football team. In 2024, he was appointed as the coach of Bayelsa United.

== Controversy ==
Bosso became famous following his racism allegation against England referee Howard Webb after Nigeria's Under-20s lost to Chile at the quarter-final stage of the 2007 FIFA U-20 World Cup. Speaking at a press conference after the game, Bosso accused Webb of racism. According to the FIFA disciplinary committee, Bosso was found guilty of "offensive behavior," resulting in a four-month ban and a fine of CHF 11,000.
