= Ghana men's national under-20 association football team =

National under-20 association football team representing Ghana

Ghana Under-20
- Nickname: The Black Satellites
- Association: Ghana Football Association
- Confederation: CAF (Africa)
- Sub-confederation: WAFU (West Africa)
- Head coach: Desmond Sakyi Ofei
- FIFA code: GHA
First colours	Second colours

First international
- Gambia 1 – 0 Ghana (Banjul, Gambia; 9 September 1984)

Biggest win
- Ghana 6 – 0 Mali (Accra, Ghana; 11 November 1990)

Biggest defeat
- Algeria 3 – 0 Ghana (Algiers, Algeria; 27 August 1988); Colombia 4 – 1 Ghana (Le Pontet, France; 29 May 2000); Argentina 3 – 0 Ghana (Buenos Aires, Argentina; 8 July 2001)

U-20 Africa Cup of Nations
- Appearances: 10 (first in 1991)
- Best result: Winners (1993, 1999, 2009, 2021)

FIFA U-20 World Cup
- Appearances: 7 (first in 1993)
- Best result: Champions (2009)

Ghana men's national under-20 association football team
Medal record

FIFA U-20 World Cup
Silver medal – second place	1993 Australia	Team
Silver medal – second place	2001 Argentina	Team
Gold medal – first place	2009 Egypt	Team
Bronze medal – third place	2013 Turkey	Team

Ghana men's national U-20 association football team known as the Black Satellites, is considered to be the feeder team for the Ghana men's national association football team. They are the former FIFA U-20 World Cup Champions and U-20 Africa Cup of Nations Champions. They have also been a four-time African Champion in 1995, 1999, 2009, 2021 and a two-time Runner-up at the FIFA World Youth Championship in 1993, 2001 and finished third in 2013. Ghana has participated in only six of the past 19 World Cup events starting with their first in Australia 1993 where they lost the World Cup final 1-2 to Brazil in Sydney and in Argentina 2001 where they lost the World Cup final 0-3 to Argentina in Buenos Aires. Incredibly, in 32 FIFA World Cup matches, Ghana has not lost a game in regulation below the Semi Final level of the FIFA U20 World Cup. They however failed to qualify for 3 consecutive events in UAE 2003, Netherlands 2005 and Canada 2007 until they made the Egypt 2009 Tournament.

They won the 2009 FIFA U-20 World Cup in the Cairo International Stadium, Cairo, Egypt after defeating Brazil 4-3 on penalties when the match ended (0-0) after extra time. This was the first time an African country won the FIFA U-20 World Cup Championship.

== Competitive Record ==
=== FIFA U-20 World Cup Record ===
Year	Round	GP	W	D*	L	GS	GA
(Tunisia) 1977	did not participate						
(Japan) 1979	did not participate						
(Australia) 1981	did not participate						
(Mexico) 1983	Withdrew						
(Soviet Union) 1985	did not qualify						
(Chile) 1987	Disqualified						
(Saudi Arabia) 1989	did not qualify						
(Portugal) 1991	did not qualify						
(Australia) 1993	Runners-up	6	3	2	1	11	6
(Qatar) 1995	did not qualify						
(Malaysia) 1997	Fourth place	7	4	1	2	12	8
(Nigeria) 1999	Quarter finals	5	3	2*	0	8	2
(Argentina) 2001	Runners-up	7	5	1	1	8	5
(United Arab Emirates) 2003	did not qualify						
(Netherlands) 2005	did not qualify						
(Canada) 2007	did not qualify						
(Egypt) 2009	Champions	7	5	2*	0	16	8
(Colombia) 2011	did not qualify						
(Turkey) 2013	Third Place	7	4	0	3	16	12
(New Zealand) 2015	Round of 16	4	2	1	1	5	6
(South Korea) 2017	did not qualify						
(Poland) 2019	did not qualify						
(Argentina) 2023	did not qualify						
(Chile) 2025	did not qualify						
(Azerbaijan) (Uzbekistan) 2027	to be determined						
(Armenia) (Georgia (country)) 2029	to be determined						
Total	7/26	43	26	9	8	76	47

=== U-20 Africa Cup of Nations record ===
U-20 Africa Cup of Nations
Year	Round	Position	GP	W	D*	L	GS	GA
1977	Did not enter							
1979	Did not enter							
1981	Did not enter							
1983	Withdrew before qualification							
1985	First round	13th	4	2	0	2	4	4
1987	Disqualified							
1989	Quarter-finals	8th	4	2	0	2	6	6
(Egypt) 1991	Third place	3rd	4	3	0	1	4	1
(Mauritius) 1993	Champions	1st	5	4	0	1	7	3
(Nigeria) 1995	Did not qualify							
(Morocco) 1997	Fourth place	4th	5	3	1	1	7	3
(Ghana) 1999	Champions	1st	5	4	1	0	10	3
(Ethiopia) 2001	Runners-up	2nd	5	2	2	1	7	5
(Burkina Faso) 2003	Group stage	4th	3	0	2	1	3	4
(Benin) 2005	Did not qualify							
(Republic of the Congo) 2007	Did not qualify							
(Rwanda) 2009	Champions	1st	5	4	1	0	11	4
(South Africa) 2011	Group stage	5th	3	0	2	1	3	4
(Algeria) 2013	Runners-up	2nd	5	2	2	1	5	2
(Senegal) 2015	Third place	3rd	5	3	0	2	7	1
(Zambia) 2017	Did not qualify							
(Niger) 2019	Group stage	7th	3	1	0	2	2	3
(Mauritania) 2021	Champions	1st	6	3	2	1	9	3
(Egypt) 2023	Did not qualify							
(Egypt) 2025	Quarter-finals	5th	4	2	2	0	5	3
(Ghana) 2027	TBD							
Total	16/26	4 titles	66	35	15	16	90	49

A gold background colour indicates that Ghana won the tournament.

*Draws include knockout matches decided on penalty kicks.

*There was no third place match from 1979-1989.

== Team honours and awards ==
- FIFA U-20 World Cup Champions: 1

2009 (final against Brazil)

- FIFA U-20 World Cup Runners-up: 2

1993, 2001

- FIFA U-20 World Cup Third-place: 1

2013

- U-20 Africa Cup of Nations Champions: 4

1993, 1999, 2009, 2021

- U-20 Africa Cup of Nations Runners-up: 2

2001, 2013

- U-20 Africa Cup of Nations Third-place: 2

1991, 2015

- WAFU U-20 Championship Champions: 1

2008

- WAFU Zone B U-20 Tournament Champions: 1

2020

- FIFA Golden Ball Winners: 2

Tournament	FIFA Golden Ball Award	Player
(Egypt) 2009	Gold Ball Award	(Ghana) Dominic Adiyiah
(Turkey) 2013	Bronze Ball Award	(Ghana) Clifford Aboagye

- FIFA Golden Shoe Winners: 2

Tournament	FIFA Golden Shoe Award
(Egypt) 2009	(Ghana) Dominic Adiyiah
(Turkey) 2013	(Ghana) Ebenezer Assifuah

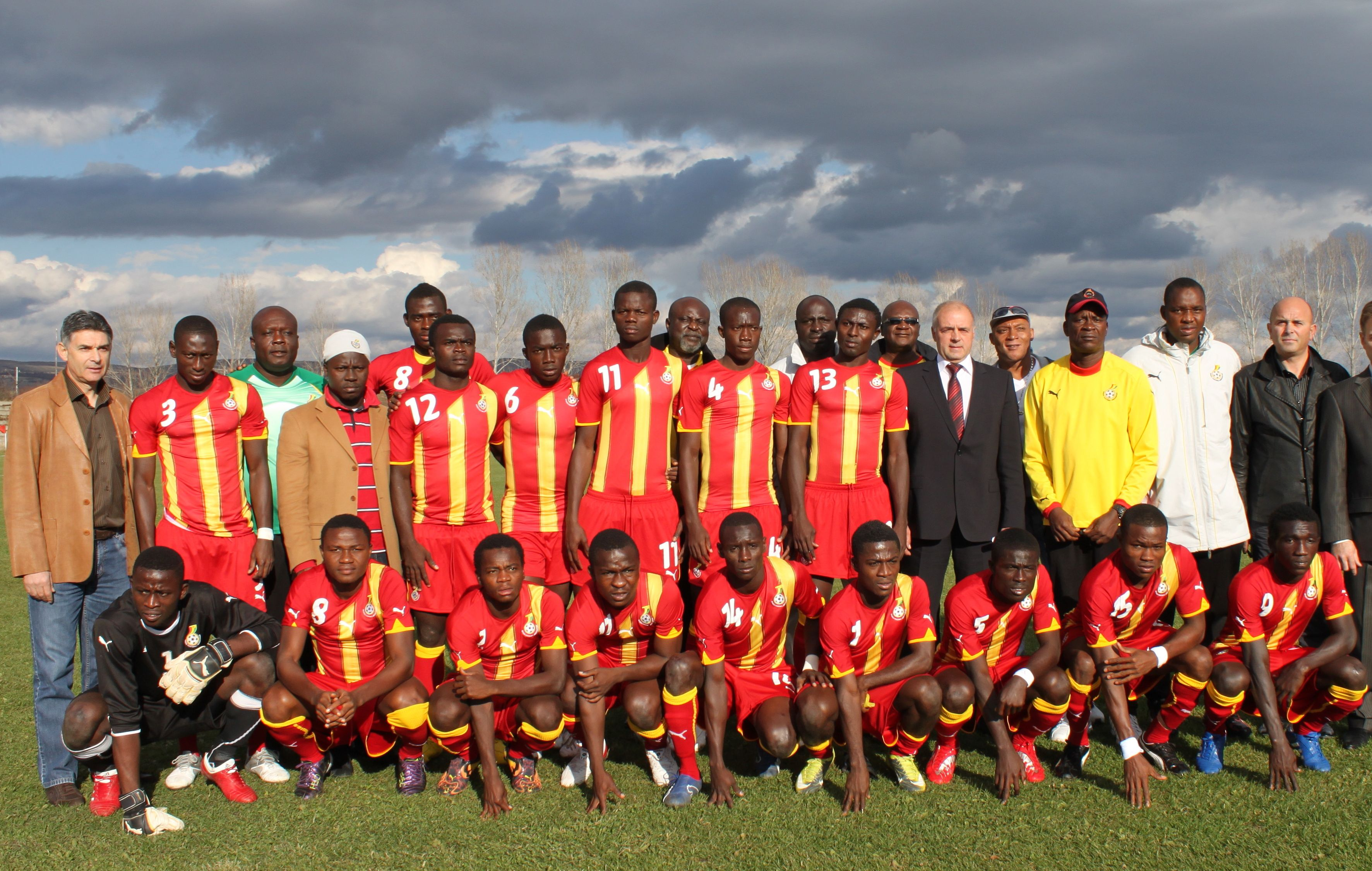
Ghana national u-21 team before the friendly match with Bulgarian V AFG side Slivnishki Geroi (1-1), 18-11-2010, Slivnitsa, Bulgaria.

== Current squad ==
The following players were selected for the 2025 U-20 Africa Cup of Nations between 27 April – 18 May 2025.

Caps and goals correct as of 5 May 2025, after the match against Senegal

No.	Pos.	Player	Date of birth (age)	Caps	Goals	Club
1	GK	Gidios Aseako	19 January 2005 (age 21)	2	0	(Ghana Football Association) Dreams
16	GK	Yakubu Saeed	31 December 2006 (age 19)	2	0	(Ghana Football Association) Medeama
21	GK	Patrick Arthur		0	0	(Ghana Football Association) Nsuopun Fidelity
4	DF	Dacosta Antwi	6 March 2007 (age 19)	4	0	(Ghana Football Association) Young Apostles
5	DF	Nana Kwame Boakye	5 December 2005 (age 20)	0	0	(Moldovan Football Federation) Sheriff Tiraspol
17	DF	Denis Marfo	28 January 2006 (age 20)	2	0	(Brazilian Football Confederation) Internacional
18	DF	Maxwell Azafokpe		5	0	(Ghana Football Association) Tudu Mighty Jets
3	MF	McCarthy Ofori	3 March 2005 (age 21)	3	0	(Albanian Football Federation) Bylis
6	MF	Kelvin Ahiable	24 June 2005 (age 21)	1	0	(Ghana Football Association) Dreams
8	MF	Ishmael Addo	23 December 2006 (age 19)	3	0	(Ghana Football Association) Heart of Lions
9	MF	Lord Afrifa	5 June 2006 (age 20)	2	0	(Austrian Football Association) Sturm Graz
14	MF	Aaron Essel	30 July 2005 (age 21)	8	0	(United States Soccer Federation) North Texas
23	MF	Hayford Boahen	14 December 2005 (age 20)	3	1	(Ghana Football Association) Cheetah
25	MF	Joseph Aidoo	19 February 2005 (age 21)	2	0	(Romanian Football Federation) Sănătatea Cluj
2	FW	Michael Amer		0	0	(Ghana Football Association) Nice Ibrahim
7	FW	Emmanuel Mensah	18 June 2005 (age 21)	2	1	(Norwegian Football Federation) Sogndal
10	FW	Aziz Issah	20 November 2005 (age 20)	2	0	(Royal Spanish Football Federation) Barcelona
11	FW	Jerry Afriyie	10 December 2006 (age 19)	4	0	(Royal Spanish Football Federation) Lugo
12	FW	Joseph Opoku	8 August 2005 (age 21)	2	0	(Royal Belgian Football Association) Zulte Waregem
13	FW	George Tei Nagadzi	14 October 2005 (age 20)	0	0	(Ghana Football Association) Vision
15	FW	Andrews Adjabeng	4 March 2006 (age 20)	5	0	(Royal Spanish Football Federation) Real Sociedad
19	FW	Musibau Aziz	30 December 2006 (age 19)	3	1	(Ghana Football Association) Dreams
20	FW	Hakim Sulemana	19 February 2005 (age 21)	3	0	(Danish Football Association) Randers
22	FW	Clinton Duodu	20 June 2005 (age 21)	0	0	(Cyprus Football Association) Apollon Limassol

== Previous squads ==
- 2015 FIFA under-20 World Cup (squads) – Ghana
- 2009 FIFA under-20 World Cup (squads) – Ghana
- 2001 FIFA under-20 World Cup (squads) – Ghana
- 1999 FIFA under-20 World Cup (squads) – Ghana
- 1997 FIFA under-20 World Cup (squads) – Ghana
- 1993 FIFA under-20 World Cup (squads) – Ghana

== Notable players ==
The following list consist of previous Ghana U-20 national team players who have won or were influential at the FIFA U-20 World Cup with the Ghana U-20 national team or the FIFA U-17 World Cup with the Ghana U-17 national team, and those who were part of the Ghana U-23 national team that won the bronze medal at the 1992 Summer Olympics. The list also includes the players who have graduated from the Ghana U-20 national team and gone on to represent the senior Ghana national team at the FIFA World Cup or African Cup of Nations:

- Clifford Aboagye (2013)
- Dominic Adiyiah (2009)
- Nii Lamptey (1993)
- André Ayew (2009)
- Daniel Addo (1993)
- Samuel Kuffour (1993)
- Augustine Ahinful (1993)
- Charles Akonnor (1993)
- Emmanuel Duah (1993)
- Isaac Asare (1993)
- Mohammed Gargo (1993)
- Christian Gyan (1997)
- Awudu Issaka (1997)
- Kofi Amponsah (1997)
- Stephen Appiah (1997, 1999)
- Peter Ofori Quaye (1997, 1999)
- Patrick Allotey (1997)
- Baffour Gyan (1999)
- Laryea Kingston (1999)
- George Blay (1999)
- Owusu Afriyie (1999)
- Michael Essien (2001)
- Sulley Muntari (2001)
- Anthony Obodai (2001)
- John Mensah (2001)
- John Paintsil (2001)
- Derek Boateng (2001)
- Emmanuel Pappoe (2001)
- Razak Pimpong (2001)
- George Owu (2001)

== Notable coaches ==
FIFA Tourney	Manager name
(Turkey) 2013	(Ghana) Sellas Tetteh
(Egypt) 2009	(Ghana) Sellas Tetteh
(Argentina) 2001	(Ghana) Emmanuel Akwasi Afranie
(Nigeria) 1999	(Italy) Giuseppe Dossena
(Malaysia) 1997	(Ghana) Francis Oti Akenteng
(Australia) 1993	(Ghana) Fred Osam-Duodu

== 2009 FIFA U-20 World Cup World Cup Winner Squad ==
Ghana

Head coach: (Ghana) Sellas Tetteh

No.	Pos.	Player	Date of birth (age)	Caps	Goals	Club
1	GK	Daniel Adjei	10 November 1989 (aged 19)			(Ghana Football Association) Liberty
2	DF	Samuel Inkoom	1 June 1989 (aged 20)			(Swiss Football Association) Basel
3	MF	Gladson Awako	31 December 1990 (aged 18)			(Ghana Football Association) Heart of Lions
4	DF	Jonathan Mensah	13 July 1990 (aged 19)			(South African Football Association) Free State Stars
5	DF	Daniel Addo	3 September 1989 (aged 20)			(Ghana Football Association) King Faisal
6	DF	David Addy	21 February 1990 (aged 19)			(Portuguese Football Federation) FC Porto
7	MF	Abeiku Quansah	2 November 1990 (aged 18)			(French Football Federation) Nice
8	MF	Emmanuel Agyemang-Badu	2 December 1990 (aged 18)			(Ghana Football Association) Asante Kotoko
9	MF	Opoku Agyemang	7 June 1989 (aged 20)			(Qatar Football Association) Al-Sadd
10	MF	André Ayew (c)	17 December 1989 (aged 19)			(French Football Federation) Marseille
11	FW	Latif Salifu	1 August 1990 (aged 19)			(Ghana Football Association) Liberty
12	DF	Ghandi Dassenu	9 August 1989 (aged 20)			(Ghana Football Association) Liberty
13	MF	Mohammed Rabiu	31 December 1989 (aged 19)			(Ghana Football Association) Liberty
14	DF	Daniel Opare	18 October 1990 (aged 18)			(Royal Spanish Football Federation) Real Madrid
15	DF	Philip Boampong	1 January 1990 (aged 19)			(Ghana Football Association) Arsenal
16	GK	Robert Dabuo	10 November 1990 (aged 18)			(Ghana Football Association) Wa All Stars
17	DF	John Benson	27 August 1991 (aged 18)			(Qatar Football Association) ASPIRE
18	FW	Ransford Osei	5 December 1990 (aged 18)			(Ghana Football Association) Medeama
19	DF	Bright Addae	19 December 1992 (aged 16)			(Ghana Football Association) Wa All Stars
20	FW	Dominic Adiyiah	29 November 1989 (aged 19)			(Norwegian Football Federation) Fredrikstad FK
21	GK	Joseph Addo	2 November 1990 (aged 18)			(Ghana Football Association) Sekondi Hasaacas

== Head-to-head record ==
The following table shows Ghana's head-to-head record in the FIFA U-20 World Cup.

Opponent	Pld	W	D	L	GF	GA	GD	Win %
Argentina	3	2	0	1	4	5	−1	66.67
Austria	1	0	1	0	1	1	+0	0.00
Brazil	3	1	1	1	3	3	+0	33.33
Chile	1	1	0	0	4	3	+1	100.00
China	1	0	1	0	1	1	+0	0.00
Costa Rica	1	1	0	0	2	0	+2	100.00
Croatia	1	0	1	0	1	1	+0	0.00
Ecuador	1	1	0	0	1	0	+1	100.00
England	2	2	0	0	6	1	+5	100.00
Egypt	1	1	0	0	2	0	+2	100.00
France	3	0	1	2	2	5	−3	0.00
Germany	1	0	1	0	2	2	+0	0.00
Hungary	1	1	0	0	3	2	+1	100.00
Iran	1	1	0	0	1	0	+1	100.00
Iraq	1	1	0	0	3	0	+3	100.00
Japan	1	1	0	0	2	1	+1	100.00
Kazakhstan	1	1	0	0	3	0	+3	100.00
Mali	1	0	0	1	0	3	−3	0.00
Panama	1	1	0	0	1	0	+1	100.00
Paraguay	1	1	0	0	2	1	+1	100.00
Portugal	2	2	0	0	5	2	+3	100.00
Republic of Ireland	2	1	0	1	3	3	+0	50.00
Russia	1	1	0	0	3	0	+3	100.00
South Africa	1	1	0	0	2	1	+1	100.00
South Korea	1	1	0	0	3	2	+1	100.00
Spain	2	0	1	1	1	2	−1	0.00
United Arab Emirates	1	1	0	0	3	0	+3	100.00
United States	2	2	0	0	5	1	+4	100.00
Uruguay	3	0	2	1	5	6	−1	0.00
Uzbekistan	1	1	0	0	2	1	+1	100.00
Total	43	26	9	8	76	47	+29	60.47

== See also ==
- Ghana national football team
- Ghana national under-23 football team
- Ghana national under-17 football team

== Footnotes ==
Preceded by 2007 Argentina	World Champions; 2009 (First title)	Succeeded by 2011 Brazil
Preceded by 1991 Egypt	African Champions; 1993 (First title)	Succeeded by 1995 Cameroon
Preceded by 1997 Morocco	African Champions; 1999 (Second title)	Succeeded by 2001 Angola
Preceded by 2007 Congo	African Champions; 2009 (Third title)	Succeeded by 2011 Nigeria
