= Daniel Agyei =

Daniel Agyei may refer to:

- Daniel Agyei (footballer, born 1989), Ghanaian football goalkeeper for Rood-Wit Zaanstad
- Daniel Kofi Agyei (born 1992), Ghanaian football midfielder for Casale
- Dan Agyei (born 1996), Ghanaian football forward for Kocaelispor
