= Samuel Inkoom =

Ghanaian footballer (born 1989)

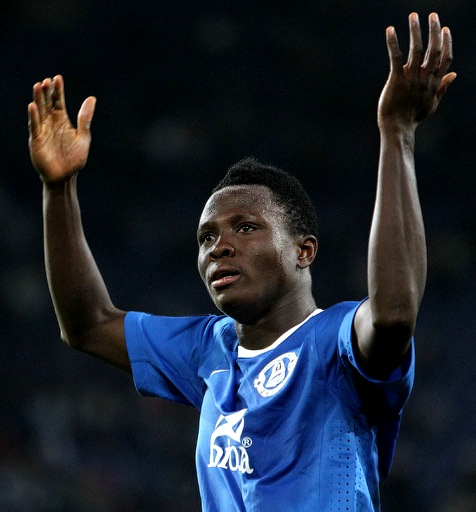
- Inkoom with Dnipro in 2011

Personal information
- Full name: Samuel Inkoom
- Date of birth: 1 June 1989 (age 37)
- Place of birth: Sekondi-Takoradi, Ghana
- Height: 1.79 m (5 ft 10 in)
- Position: Right back

Youth career
- 1999–2000: Junior Juventus Academy
- 2000–2007: Windy Academy

Senior career*
Years	Team	Apps	(Gls)
2007–2008	Sekondi Hasaacas		
2008–2009	Asante Kotoko	26	(7)
2009–2011	Basel	43	(1)
2011–2014	Dnipro	27	(0)
2013	→ Bastia (loan)	4	(0)
2014	→ Platanias (loan)	15	(0)
2014	D.C. United	2	(0)
2015–2016	Boavista	8	(0)
2016	Antalyaspor	15	(0)
2017	Vereya	12	(0)
2019	Dunav Ruse	18	(0)
2020	Samtredia	14	(1)
2021–2022	Torpedo Kutaisi	25	(1)
2022–2023	Accra Hearts of Oak	28	(2)
Total		237	(11)

International career^{‡}
2009	Ghana U20	6	(0)
2008–2015	Ghana	44	(1)
Medal record
Ghana
Africa Cup of Nations
Silver medal – second place	2010 Africa Cup of Nations	Team
FIFA U-20 World Cup
Gold medal – first place	2009 U–20 World Cup	Team
Africa U-20 Cup of Nations
Gold medal – first place	2009 CAF U20	Team
- * Club domestic league appearances and goals as of 1 March 2023 ‡ National team caps and goals as of 14 June 2015

Samuel Inkoom (born 1 June 1989) is a Ghanaian former professional footballer who plays as a defender. Between 2008 and 2014, he made 44 appearances scoring 1 goal for the Ghana national team. He has played in teams based in 9 countries, namely Switzerland, Ukraine, France, Greece, United States of America, Portugal, Turkey, Bulgaria and latest in Georgia.

== Club career ==
Inkoom began his career with Sekondi Hasaacas in his native Ghana. He later moved to Asante Kotoko SC in Ghana.

On 26 April 2009, it was announced that Inkoom moved for an undisclosed fee from Asante Kotoko to FC Basel in the Swiss Super League on a three-year contract. He joined Basel's first team during their 2009–10 season under head coach Thorsten Fink. After playing in three test games, Inkoom played his domestic league debut for the club in the away game in the Kybunpark on 12 July 2009 as Basel were defeated 0–2 by St. Gallen. At the end of the 2009–10 season he won the Double with his club. They won the League Championship title with 3 points advantage over second placed Young Boys. The team won the Swiss Cup, winning the final 6–0 against Lausanne-Sport.

Inkoom scored his first league goal for Basel on 25 September 2010 in the away game in the Letzigrund as his team won 4–1 against rivals Zürich. In the 2010–11 Champions League group stage away game on 19 October 2010 Inkoom scored a goal for his team as Basel won 3–1 against Roma. On 24 January 2011 left the club. During his 18 months with the club, Inkoom played a total of 74 games for Basel scoring just those two goals. 42 of these games were in the Swiss Super League, three in the Swiss Cup, 19 in the UEFA competitions (Champions League and Europa League) and nine were friendly games.

Inkoom moved to FC Dnipro Dnipropetrovsk of the Ukrainian Premier League. On 30 October 2011, in a league game against FC Karpaty Lviv, Inkoom received a yellow card for taking his shirt off while leaving the pitch to be substituted by Yevhen Shakhov. This was Inkoom's second yellow card of the game and he received a red card and Shakhov could not come on. His side were able to hold out for the 2–0 away win though.

In February 2013 Inkoom moved to Bastia of the French Ligue 1 for the rest of the 2013–14 season. The following season Inkoom again moved on six-month loan, this time to Greek side Platanias in January 2014.

In September 2014, Inkoom signed with D.C. United of Major League Soccer on a free transfer. Personal terms were not disclosed.

On 8 December 2014, Inkoom was traded to Houston Dynamo along with Joe Willis, in exchange for Andrew Driver and a fourth-round 2016 MLS SuperDraft pick. However, he did not sign with the club.

On 11 June 2015, Inkoom joined Boavista of the Portuguese Primeira Liga on a three-year deal.

On 6 January 2016, Inkoom signed a contract with Turkish-side Antalyaspor.

On 24 February 2017, Inkoom joined Bulgarian club FC Vereya. He made his debut for the team in match against Ludogorets Razgrad for the Bulgarian First League on 26 February 2017. He left the team in June when his contract expired. On 23 June 2017, the Bulgarian Football Union banned Inkoom for one year following a legal notice from FIFA that he had caused damages to a real estate worth 65 316 USD while he was playing for D.C. United.

== International career ==
Inkoom is a former member of the Ghana national under-20 football team, the Black Satellites. He played with the team at 2009 African Youth Championship in Rwanda. The team emerged the winner at that tournament, he was part of the satellite side that beat Brazil in a penalty shoot out to annex the cup for Africa and Ghana for the first time in the under 20 tournament in 2009. Inkoom played his first game for the senior side, the Black Stars, on 20 November 2008 against Tunisia.

He received his first start for Ghana in the World Cup qualifier against Benin on 28 March, which Ghana won 1–0. Inkoom used to be a member of the Ghana national under-17 football team, the Black Starlets. He was in the extended squad for the 2005 FIFA U-17 World Championship in Peru. He was part of Ghana's 2015 Africa Cup of Nations campaign, helping them reach the final, where they lost in a penalty shootout against the Ivory Coast.

== Personal life ==
In April 2015, it was revealed that Inkoom was sued by the landlord of the property he rented in the United States whilst playing with D.C. United for destroying the property and not paying rent.

== Honours ==
Asante Kotoko

- Ghana Premier League: 2007–08
- President's Cup: 2008
- SWAG Cup: 2008

Basel

- Swiss Super League: 2010
- Swiss Cup: 2010

Accra Hearts of Oak

- Ghanaian FA Cup: 2022

Ghana U-20

- African Youth Championship: 2009
- FIFA U-20 World Cup: 2009

Ghana

- Africa Cup of Nations Silver Medal: 2010, 2015
