= Anthony Mieres =

English religious leader

Anthony Mieres was a 16th-century influential English Protestant.

Anthony Mieres was one of the Marian exiles. Mary I of England arranged for eleven of the exiles to be arrested for sedition, including Mieres.
