= Francesco Bini =

Italian footballer (born 1989)

Personal information
- Full name: Francesco Bini
- Date of birth: 2 January 1989 (age 37)
- Place of birth: Empoli, Italy
- Height: 1.90 m (6 ft 3 in)
- Position: Centre back

Team information
- Current team: Pro Palazzolo
- Number: 4

Youth career
- Piacenza

Senior career*
Years	Team	Apps	(Gls)
2006–2010	Piacenza	39	(0)
2011	→ Cremonese (loan)	7	(0)
2011–2012	→ Reggina (loan)	0	(0)
2012–2013	Treviso	10	(0)
2013–2014	Mantova	36	(4)
2014–2017	Pro Piacenza	102	(6)
2017–2018	Piacenza	25	(2)
2018–2019	Gozzano	17	(0)
2019–2020	Vigor Carpaneto	18	(5)
2020–2021	Caratese	30	(0)
2021–2022	Legnano	31	(1)
2022–2023	Franciacorta	32	(5)
2023–	Pro Palazzolo	4	(0)

International career
2009	Italy U20	12	(0)
- * Club domestic league appearances and goals as of 30 September 2023

Francesco Bini (born 2 January 1989) is an Italian footballer who plays as a defender for Serie D club Pro Palazzolo.

== Club career ==
On 16 July 2019 he joined Serie D club Vigor Carpaneto.

== International ==
He was a member of the Italy under-20 sides that took part at the 2009 Mediterranean Games and the 2009 FIFA U-20 World Cup.
