= Boalefa Pule =

South African soccer player

Personal information
- Full name: Boalefa Marvin Pule
- Date of birth: 7 April 1990 (age 36)
- Place of birth: Zeerust, South Africa
- Height: 1.78 m (5 ft 10 in)
- Position: Goalkeeper

Team information
- Current team: Baroka

Senior career*
Years	Team	Apps	(Gls)
2011–2023	SuperSport United	9	(0)
2014–2015	→ Bidvest Wits (loan)	0	(0)
2017–2018	→ AmaZulu (loan)	11	(0)
2023–	Baroka	12	(0)

International career^{‡}
2017	South Africa	4	(0)
- * Club domestic league appearances and goals as of 16 November 2023 ‡ National team caps and goals as of 00:59, 21 March 2021 (UTC)

Boalefa Marvin Pule (born 7 April 1990) is a South African soccer player who plays as a goalkeeper for South African First Division side Baroka.
