= Robert Dabuo =

Ghanaian footballer

Personal information
- Full name: Robert Dabou
- Date of birth: November 10, 1990 (age 35)
- Place of birth: Ghana
- Height: 1.84 m (6 ft 0 in)
- Position: Goalkeeper

Team information
- Current team: Ashanti Gold
- Number: 1

Youth career
- –2006: All Stars F.C.

Senior career*
Years	Team	Apps	(Gls)
2007–2013	All Stars F.C.		
2013–	Ashanti Gold		

International career
2007	Ghana U-17		
2008–2009	Ghana U-20		
2016–	Ghana		
- * Club domestic league appearances and goals as of 24 April 2016

Robert Dabou (born 10 November 1990) is a Ghanaian footballer who plays for the Ghana Premier League side Ashanti Gold as a goalkeeper.

== Career ==
Dabou began his career at All Stars F.C. Before being promoted to the first team, he played his first game in 2007 for the squad.

== International ==
Dabuo was a member of the Ghana national under-17 football team in 2007 FIFA U-17 World Cup in Korea Republic. On 19 August 2008, Dabuo was called up to the Satellites, and was part of the Ghana national under-20 football team that won the 2009 FIFA U-20 World Cup in Egypt.

== Titles and Honours ==
=== International ===
Ghana U-20

- FIFA U-20 World Cup Champion: 2009

== Trivia ==
- Fifa Profile
