= Tomáš Fabián =

Czech footballer

Personal information
- Full name: Tomáš Fabián
- Date of birth: 10 September 1989 (age 37)
- Place of birth: Mladá Boleslav, Czechoslovakia
- Height: 1.83 m (6 ft 0 in)
- Position: Midfielder

Team information
- Current team: Mnichovohradistsky

Youth career
- 1995–2003: MSK Mnichovo Hradiště
- 2003–2009: Mladá Boleslav

Senior career*
Years	Team	Apps	(Gls)
2008–2019	Mladá Boleslav	64	(6)
2013	→ Varnsdorf (loan)	8	(1)
2019	Zápy	11	(0)
2019–2023	Kosmonosy	0	(0)
2023–2026	Benátky nad Jizerou	27	(11)
2026–	Mnichovohradistsky	0	(0)

International career
2009–2010	Czech Republic U-21	3	(0)
- * Club domestic league appearances and goals as of 20:13, 25 September 2019 (UTC)

Tomáš Fabián (born 10 September 1989) is a Czech football player who plays as a midfielder for Mnichovohradistsky.

Fabián played for Czech youth national teams and took part in the 2009 FIFA U-20 World Cup.

== Career ==
In February 2019, Fabián left Mladá Boleslav and later joined SK Zápy.
