= Saif Yousef =

Emirati footballer (born 1989)

Personal information
- Full name: Saif Yousef Mohammed Moosa Abdulla
- Date of birth: 10 January 1989 (age 37)
- Place of birth: United Arab Emirates
- Height: 1.79 m (5 ft 10 1/2 in)
- Position: Goalkeeper

Youth career
- Al Ahli

Senior career*
Years	Team	Apps	(Gls)
2010–2019	Shabab Al-Ahli	33	(0)
- * Club domestic league appearances and goals

Saif Yousef Mohamed Moosa Abdulla (Arabic:سيف يوسف محمد موسى عبدالله; born 10 January 1989) is an Emirati footballer. He currently plays as a goalkeeper.
