= Yacouba Diarra =

Malian footballer (born 1988)

Personal information
- Full name: Yacouba Diarra
- Date of birth: November 30, 1988 (age 37)
- Place of birth: Bamako, Mali
- Height: 1.90 m (6 ft 3 in)
- Position: Attacking midfielder

Team information
- Current team: Hammam-Lif
- Number: 21

Youth career
- AS Korofina

Senior career*
Years	Team	Apps	(Gls)
2007–2008	AS Korofina	26	(9)
2008–2010	ES Sahel	12	(2)
2010	→ ES Zarzis (loan)	12	(2)
2011	ES Sahel	12	(4)
2012–2013	ENPPI		
2012–2013	→ Muaither (loan)		
2013–	Hammam-Lif	17	(2)

International career
2009–	Mali	2	(0)
- * Club domestic league appearances and goals

Yacouba Diarra (born November 30, 1988, in Bamako) is a Malian football player who currently plays for Tunisian side CS Hammam-Lif.

== Career ==
Diarra began his career in his hometown Bamako with AS Korofina and signed in January 2008 for Tunisian top club ES Sahel, after that he moved in January 2012 to another popular Egyptian club Al-Masry.

== International career ==
Diarra is part of the Mali national football team and made his debut in early 2009.
