= Joel Silva (footballer, born 1989) =

Paraguayan footballer

Personal information
- Full name: Joel Alberto Silva Estigarribia
- Date of birth: 13 January 1989 (age 37)
- Place of birth: Carapeguá, Paraguay
- Height: 1.84 m (6 ft 1/2 in)
- Position: Goalkeeper

Team information
- Current team: Deportes Quindío
- Number: 30

Youth career
- Guaraní

Senior career*
Years	Team	Apps	(Gls)
2007–2012	Guaraní	112	(0)
2013	→ Luqueño (loan)	35	(0)
2015–2018	Deportes Tolima	135	(0)
2018–2019	Deportivo Capiatá	39	(0)
2019–2020	Olimpia	0	(0)
2022–2023	Fernando de la Mora		
2025	River Plate		
2026–	Deportes Quindío		

International career^{‡}
2011–	Paraguay	7	(0)
- * Club domestic league appearances and goals as of 03:53, 16 August 2026 (UTC) ‡ National team caps and goals as of 03:53, 16 August 2026 (UTC)

Joel Alberto Silva Estigarribia (born 13 January 1989) is a Paraguayan international footballer who plays as a goalkeeper for Colombian club Deportes Quindío.

== Career ==
Born in Carapeguá, Silva has played for Guaraní, Luqueño and Deportes Tolima. He made his international debut for Paraguay in 2011, and appeared at the 2009 FIFA U-20 World Cup where he was the team captain.

After leaving Deportivo Capiatá, Silva played for Olimpia (2019–2020) and Fernando de la Mora (2022–2023) in Paraguay, before a spell at River Plate of the Paraguayan División Intermedia.

On 29 January 2026, Silva returned to Colombian football, signing with Deportes Quindío of the Categoría Primera B on a contract until December 2026.
