= Shagari Mohammed =

Nigerian footballer (born 1990)

Shagari Shehu
Personal information
- Full name: Shehu Mohammed Shagari
- Date of birth: 29 November 1990 (age 35)
- Place of birth: Kano, Nigeria
- Height: 1.89 m (6 ft 2 in)
- Position: Left midfielder

Team information
- Current team: Kano Pillars F.C.
- Number: 7

Senior career*
Years	Team	Apps	(Gls)
2008–	Kano Pillars F.C.		

International career
2009	Nigeria U-20	2	(0)
- * Club domestic league appearances and goals

Shehu Mohammed Shagari (born 29 November 1990) is a Nigerian footballer who is currently playing in the Nigerian Premier League for Kano Pillars F.C.

== Career ==
Shehu began 2004 his career with the second team of Kano Pillars F.C. The left Midfielder was promoted to the first team in 2008.

== International career ==
Shagari is member of the 2009 FIFA U-20 World Cup squad. He was a reserve player in the first game on 25 September against Venezuela and was with the team in the August 2009 Training Camp in Spain.
