= John Benson (footballer, born 1991) =

Ghanaian footballer

Personal information
- Full name: John Benson
- Date of birth: 27 August 1991 (age 35)
- Place of birth: Obuasi, Ghana
- Height: 1.75 m (5 ft 9 in)
- Position: Defender

Youth career
- 2002–2005: Ajax Football Academy
- 2005–2006: Goldfields academy

Senior career*
Years	Team	Apps	(Gls)
2006	Ashanti Gold SC	6	(3)
2006–2009	Kofi ti bola	16	(4)
2009–2021	Al Ahli	144	(1)
2021–2022	Mesaimeer		
2022–2023	Al-Markhiya		
2023–2024	Al-Kharaitiyat		
2024–2025	Muaither		

International career
2009	Ghana U20	2	(0)
- * Club domestic league appearances and goals

John Benson (born 27 August 1991) is a Ghanaian footballer who plays as a defender.

== Career ==
Benson began his career with Shaggy FC. He also joined Ajax Football Academy in Obuasi before he transferred in 2006 to Goldfields academy. In February 2006 he signed with ASPIRE Academy for Sports Excellence and after the 2009 FIFA U-20 World Cup signed for the Qatar Stars League side Al Ahli.

== International career ==
He represented the Ghana U-20 team in Egypt at the 2009 FIFA U-20 World Cup.

== Recognition ==
=== Ghana U-20 ===
- FIFA U-20 World Cup Champion: 2009
