= Carlos Salazar (Venezuelan footballer) =

Venezuelan footballer (born 1989)

Personal information
- Full name: Carlos Alfredo Salazar Cumana
- Date of birth: 15 May 1989 (age 37)
- Place of birth: Barcelona, Venezuela
- Height: 1.88 m (6 ft 2 in)
- Position: Centre back

Senior career*
Years	Team	Apps	(Gls)
2007–2008	Carabobo	1	(0)
2008–2009	Aragua	13	(0)
2009–2012	Deportivo Anzoátegui	97	(3)
2012–2015	Deportivo Táchira	26	(0)
2016	Deportivo Anzoátegui	2	(0)
2016	Estudiantes de Caracas	16	(1)
2017–2018	Aragua FC	60	(2)
2019	Academia Puerto Cabello	23	(2)
2020–2021	Zulia	25	(2)

International career
2009–2012	Venezuela	11	(0)
- * Club domestic league appearances and goals as of 19:53, 5 October 2020 (UTC)

Carlos Alfredo Salazar Cumana (born 15 May 1989) is a Venezuelan international footballer as a central defender.

== Career ==
Salazar has played club football for Carabobo, Aragua and Deportivo Anzoátegui.

He made his international debut for Venezuela in 2009.
