= Adama Kéïta =

Malian footballer (born 1990)

Personal information
- Full name: Adama Kéïta
- Date of birth: 3 May 1990 (age 36)
- Place of birth: Bamako, Mali
- Height: 1.82 m (6 ft 0 in)
- Position: Goalkeeper

Senior career*
Years	Team	Apps	(Gls)
2007–2013	CO Bamako		
2013–2020	Djoliba AC		
2020–2021	CI Kamsar		
2021–2022	Gor Mahia		

International career
2017	Mali	1	(0)
- * Club domestic league appearances and goals

Adama Kéïta (born 3 May 1990) is a Malian professional footballer who plays as a goalkeeper.

== Club career ==
Kéïta signed for Kenyan club Gor Mahia in August 2021. In July 2022, he left Gor Mahia and reported the club to FIFA over an alleged contract breach. In November 2022, FIFA's Dispute Resolution Chamber ruled in his favor, awarding him KSh 4.4 million, including 5% interest. After Gor Mahia initially paid part of the award in March 2023, FIFA lifted a transfer ban, but the club later failed to meet the agreed payment deadlines. This led FIFA to reimpose a transfer ban on Gor Mahia in February 2024, with the outstanding amount now including penalties and interest.

== International career ==
Kéïta's only match for Mali came on 6 August 2017, when he played in a 1–1 friendly draw against Senegal.

== Career statistics ==
=== International ===
Appearances and goals by national team and year
National team	Year	Apps	Goals
Mali	2017	1	0
Total		1	0

== Honours ==
CO Bamako

- Malian Cup: 2011
- Super Coupe National du Mali: 2011 (Note: Stade Malien, CO Bamako's opponents in the 2011 Super Coupe National du Mali, withdrew from the game. CO Bamako were handed the victory.)
