= Wellington Júnior =

Brazilian footballer (born 1989)

Personal information
- Full name: Wellington Cândido da Silva Júnior
- Date of birth: 20 June 1989 (age 37)
- Place of birth: Rio de Janeiro, Brazil
- Height: 1.78 m (5 ft 10 in)
- Positions: Forward; winger

Youth career
- 2007–2010: Botafogo

Senior career*
Years	Team	Apps	(Gls)
2010–2014	Botafogo	0	(0)
2010	→ Duque de Caxias (loan)		
2010–2011	→ Spartak Trnava (loan)	20	(1)
2012	→ Madureira (loan)	0	(0)
2012–2013	→ Bangu (loan)	0	(0)
2013–2014	→ Wil (loan)	18	(2)
2014–2016	Biel-Bienne	3	(1)
2015–2016	→ Köniz (loan)	27	(4)
2016	Portuguesa-RJ	2	(0)
2016–2017	Köniz	0	(0)
2018	Cabofriense	0	(0)
2018	Sampaio Corrêa-RJ	0	(0)
2019	Olaria	0	(0)
2020	Macaé	0	(0)

International career
2009	Brazil U-20	7	(1)
- * Club domestic league appearances and goals

Wellington Cândido da Silva Júnior (born 20 June 1989), commonly known as Wellington Júnior or sometimes Wellington, is a Brazilian football forward.

He played at the 2009 FIFA U-20 World Cup. He played there in four matches, one in a group stage and then in the quarter-final, semi-final and final.
