= Rodrigo Mieres =

Uruguayan footballer (born 1989)

Personal information
- Full name: Rodrigo Gastón Mieres Pérez
- Date of birth: 19 April 1989 (age 37)
- Place of birth: Paysandú, Uruguay
- Height: 1.90 m (6 ft 3 in)
- Position: Centre back

Team information
- Current team: La Luz
- Number: 3

Senior career*
Years	Team	Apps	(Gls)
2010–2012	Defensor Sporting	1	(0)
2010–2011	→ Rentistas (loan)	12	(0)
2012–2013	Central Español	10	(0)
2013	→ Toledo (loan)	8	(1)
2013–2016	Sud América	16	(1)
2014	→ Deportivo Cuenca (loan)	34	(1)
2015	→ Atlético Tucumán (loan)	16	(1)
2016–2017	Central Córdoba	39	(2)
2017–2019	Quilmes	14	(0)
2019	Juventud	10	(0)
2020–2023	Progreso	45	(2)
2024–	La Luz	13	(1)

International career
2008–2009	Uruguay U20		
- * Club domestic league appearances and goals as of 14 September 2024

Rodrigo Gastón Mieres Pérez (born 19 April 1989) is a Uruguayan professional footballer who plays as a defender for La Luz.

== Club career ==
Mieres' career began in his homeland with Defensor Sporting of the Primera División. He made his bow on 25 April against Montevideo Wanderers, which turned out to be his sole match for the club. Mieres spend the 2010–11 season out on loan with Rentistas, featuring twelve times. Brazil's Toledo completed the loan signing of Mieres on 9 January 2013. He scored on his starting debut in the Campeonato Paranaense, netting the winner in a 2–1 victory over Arapongas in March. A total of eight appearances arrived with Toledo. He returned to Uruguay later that year, subsequently joining top-flight Sud América.

Having scored one goal in thirteen fixtures for Sud América in the 2013–14 season, Mieres was loaned to Ecuadorian Serie A team Deportivo Cuenca in January 2014. Twelve months later, Primera B Nacional's Atlético Tucumán of Argentina done likewise. He played full seasons for both sides, scoring against Liga de Loja and Sportivo Belgrano respectively, as he notably won the league title, and subsequent promotion, with Atlético Tucumán. Mieres went back to Uruguay in early 2016 with Sud América, but soon sealed a return to Argentina after agreeing a move to Central Córdoba in July.

Central Córdoba suffered relegation from the 2016–17 Primera B Nacional, though Mieres stayed in the second tier after being signed by Quilmes - a team just relegated from the Primera División. A sixty-two minute appearance against Juventud Unida was the defender's only feature in the 2017–18 campaign, after suffering a knee ligament injury in the match.

== International career ==
Mieres was selected by Uruguay for the 2009 FIFA U-20 World Cup in Egypt, though didn't make an appearance as they were eliminated in the round of sixteen by Brazil. A year previous, Mieres was selected for the L'Alcúdia International Tournament.

== Career statistics ==
As of 15 March 2019.

Appearances and goals by club, season and competition
Club	Season	League			Cup		Continental		Other		Total	
Club	Season	Division	Apps	Goals	Apps	Goals	Apps	Goals	Apps	Goals	Apps	Goals
Defensor Sporting	2009–10	Primera División	1	0	0	0	—		0	0	1	0
Defensor Sporting	2010–11	Primera División	0	0	0	0	0	0	0	0	0	0
Defensor Sporting	2011–12	Primera División	0	0	0	0	—		0	0	0	0
Defensor Sporting	Total		1	0	0	0	0	0	0	0	1	0
Rentistas (loan)	2010–11	Segunda División	12	0	0	0	—		0	0	12	0
Central Español	2012–13	Primera División	10	0	0	0	—		0	0	10	0
Toledo (loan)	2013	Campeonato Paranaense	—		0	0	—		8	1	8	1
Sud América	2013–14	Primera División	13	1	0	0	—		0	0	13	1
Sud América	2014–15	Primera División	0	0	0	0	—		0	0	0	0
Sud América	2015–16	Primera División	3	0	0	0	—		0	0	3	0
Sud América	Total		16	1	0	0	—		0	0	16	1
Deportivo Cuenca (loan)	2014	Serie A	34	1	0	0	—		0	0	34	1
Atlético Tucumán (loan)	2015	Primera B Nacional	16	1	1	0	—		0	0	17	1
Central Córdoba	2016–17	Primera B Nacional	39	2	1	0	—		0	0	40	2
Quilmes	2017–18	Primera B Nacional	1	0	0	0	—		0	0	1	0
Quilmes	2018–19	Primera B Nacional	7	0	0	0	—		0	0	7	0
Quilmes	Total		8	0	0	0	—		0	0	8	0
Career total			136	5	2	0	0	0	0	0	138	5

== Honours ==
Rentistas

- Segunda División: 2010–11

Atlético Tucumán

- Primera B Nacional: 2015
