= Latif Salifu =

Ghanaian footballer

Personal information
- Full name: Abdul-Latif Salifu
- Date of birth: 1 August 1990 (age 36)
- Place of birth: Kumasi, Ghana
- Height: 1.64 m (5 ft 4 1/2 in)
- Position: Striker

Team information
- Current team: King Faisal
- Number: 11

Youth career
- Liberty Professionals F.C.

Senior career*
| Years | Team | Apps | (Gls) |
| 2007– | Liberty Professionals F.C. | | |

International career
| 2009 | Ghana U-20 | 1 | (0) |
- * Club domestic league appearances and goals

Abdul-Latif Salifu (born 8 January 1990 in [Kumasi]) is a Ghanaian football player currently playing for Ghana Telecom Premier League side Liberty Professionals F.C.

== Career ==
Salifu is one of the biggest talents from Liberty Professionals F.C., he scored 12 goals in 16 games in his first season and was a nominee for Player of the Year 2008.

== International ==
Salifu presented the Ghana U-20 team in Egypt at the 2009 FIFA U-20 World Cup. He is also in the extended squad of the Ghana national football team and played in a local national game against Togo national football team.
