= Daniel Agyei (footballer, born 1989) =

Ghanaian footballer (born 1989)

Personal information
- Full name: Daniel Yaw Agyei
- Date of birth: 10 November 1989 (age 36)
- Place of birth: Dansoman, Greater Accra, Ghana
- Height: 1.86 m (6 ft 1 in)
- Position: Goalkeeper

Team information
- Current team: Rood-Wit Zaanstad

Senior career*
Years	Team	Apps	(Gls)
2008–2013	Liberty Professionals		
2013–2014	Free State Stars	15	(0)
2014–2016	Liberty Professionals		
2016	Medeama	8	(0)
2016–2017	Simba	0	(0)
2018	Jimma Aba Jifar		
2018–2019	Jimma Aba Buna		
2019–2020	Sebeta City		
2020–2021	Mekelle 70 Enderta		
2021	Wolaitta Dicha		
2022–2023	OFC	9	(1)
2023–	Rood-Wit Zaanstad	0	(0)

International career
2009	Ghana U-20	7	(0)
2009–2013	Ghana	5	(0)
- * Club domestic league appearances and goals as of 8 December 2016 (UTC)

Daniel Yaw Agyei (also spelled Adjei; born 10 November 1989) is a Ghanaian professional footballer who plays as a goalkeeper for Rood-Wit Zaanstad.

== Club career ==
Agyei was born in Dansoman, Ghana.

== International career ==
Agyei represented Ghana at under-20 level and won with the team both the 2009 African Youth Championship and the 2009 FIFA U-20 World Cup, where Ghana defeated Brazil on penalties. He earned his first senior call to the Black Stars for the World Cup qualification match against Mali. He made his Ghana national team debut on 18 November 2009 in a friendly match against Angola.

== Career statistics ==
As of match played on 13 January 2013.

Appearances and goals by national team and year
National team	Year	Apps	Goals
Ghana	2009	1	0
Ghana	2010	3	0
Ghana	2013	1	0
Total		5	0

== Honours ==
'Ghana

- Africa Cup of Nations runner-up: 2010

'Ghana U20

- FIFA U-20 World Cup: 2009
- African Youth Championship: 2009
