= Abeiku Quansah =

Ghanaian professional footballer (born 1990)

Personal information
- Full name: Abeiku Quansah
- Date of birth: 2 November 1990 (age 35)
- Place of birth: Kumasi, Ghana
- Height: 1.77 m (5 ft 10 in)
- Positions: Midfielder; winger

Team information
- Current team: Berekum Chelsea

Youth career
- –2005: Windy Professionals

Senior career*
Years	Team	Apps	(Gls)
2005–2008	Windy Professionals		
2008–2011	Nice	9	(0)
2011–2013	Arsenal Kyiv	13	(0)
2014	El Gouna	8	(0)
2018–2019	Motema Pembe		(0)
2019–	Berekum Chelsea		(0)

International career
2007	Ghana U17	6	(0)
2009	Ghana U20	6	(1)
- * Club domestic league appearances and goals

Abeiku Quansah (born 2 November 1990) is a Ghanaian professional footballer who plays as a midfielder or winger for Berekum Chelsea.

== Club career ==
Quansah was born in Kumasi.

On 4 November 2008, he moved from Windy Professionals F.C. to OGC Nice and signed a contract between 30 June 2011. He came along with national teammate Enoch Kofi Adu. Quansah played his debut match in the Coupe de la Ligue against US Creteil on 11 November 2008 and his second game in the Coupe de France on 3 January 2009 against Arras Football.

In 2011, he went on to Arsenal Kyiv. He stayed throughout 2013, then joined El Gouna in Egypt.

== International career ==
He was member of the Ghana national under-17 football team in the 2007 FIFA U-17 World Cup and played 6 games in the tournament in Korea Republic. On 1 January 2009, he was named for the Black Satellites for the 2009 African Youth Championship in Rwanda.

== Honours ==
=== International ===
Ghana U-20

- African Youth Championship: 2009
- FIFA U-20 World Cup: 2009
