= List of football clubs in Ghana =

== 2 ==
- 24/7 (24 Seven) United

== A ==
- Amanful Eleven
- A.A. DC United
- Abeasi F.C.
- Abor Wonderers FC (Abor)
- Abreshia Nsamka FC
- Abububu Labourers
- Abuakwa Susu Biribi
- Abura Dunkwa Galaxy FC
- Abura Abaka Vision Stars
- AC Milan Colts Club
- Accra Golden Bliss
- Accra Angels fc
- Accra Inter Allies
- Accra Celtic FC
- Accra Lions Football Club
- Accra New Town Youth
- Accra Rangers
- Action FC
- Adamsu Manchester
- Adansi United
- Adansiman (Obuasi)
- Adisadel Great Astronomers
- Adom Wonders
- Adom Football Club (Kumasi)
- Aduana F.C.
- Aduana Stars (Kumasi)
- Adenta United
- Adenta Youth FC
- Adwempa FC
- Advanced Stars
- AFA Club
- Afienya United
- African Stars (Accra)
- African United
- Ahantaman United
- Ahofra Royals
- Ahorsu United (Akim)
- Agbozume United FC (Agbozume)
- Agogo SEC School
- Agona Abrem Shalom FC
- Agona Mensakrom Alpha Stars
- Agona Fankobaa (Swedru)
- Agona Swedru Young Rangers
- Ahafo Great Farisco Stars
- Ajax Accra FC
- Ajumako Akyeramfo United
- Ajumako Ochiso Eleven Angels
- Akim Oda Sunderland Football Academy (Ghana) (England)
- Akim Swedru Super Stars
- Akim United
- Akrodie Mighty Powers
- Akrodie Nokia Boys
- Akosombo United
- Akotex Aksombo
- Akotex FC (Tema)
- Akuapim United
- Akwantufo Dokroyewa
- Akwatia Diamond Stars
- Ali Jaraa Academy
- All Blacks F.C. (Swedru)
- All for Christ Academy
- All Sparks FC
- All Stars (Wa)
- ALO F.C.
- Amali Stars
- Amanfro Young Hearts
- Amanese Super Stars
- Ambah FC
- Amidaus Professionals
- Ankara Babies
- Ankara FC
- Anloga Carpenters Union
- Anokye FC
- Anokye Stars
- Apam Liberty FC
- Apam Maxbees Babies
- Apenkwa Golden Boys FC
- Apex United
- Army F.C.
- Arnold Warriors (Apeguso)
- Asana S. Kings
- AsanSka FC
- Asanker
- Asante Kotoko
- Asante K.S. (Mampong)
- Ashanti Royals
- Asemerik F.C.
- AshantiGold (Obuasi)
- Ashanti Heroes
- Ashanti United
- Ashaalaja FC
- Assin Akrofuom Santos FC
- Assin North United
- Aston Villa (Brong-Ahafo)
- Asuokwaw Young Stars
- Attandanso Royals
- Attram De Visser Soccer Academy
- Atom F.C.
- Auroras FC
- Awutu Bastia FC
- Awutu DC JSS XI

== B ==
- B.R.M. Stars
- B.T. International
- Bafana (Sekondi)
- Banana CF
- Barimah FC
- Barly Wise
- Bayern Munich (Aflao)
- Bazooka F.C.
- Bechem Chelsea
- Bechem United
- Bepoaseman FC
- Berekum A.C. Milan
- Berekum Arsenal
- Berekum Berlin FC
- Berlin FC
- Biriwa Soccer Academy
- Bisa (Goma)
- Black Boys
- Black Kings F.C.
- Black Rangers
- Tano Bofoakwa
- Bogoso National
- Boison F.C
- Bolga F.C
- Bolga Juventus
- Bolgatanga Manchester City
- Bolgatanga Upper United
- Boye Sowahs Zebi (Accra)
- Bravo Bravo F.C.
- Bremen Asekuma United
- Bright Future FC
- Brong Ahafo F.C.
- Brong Ahafo Stars
- Brong-Ahafo United
- Bronkyempem (Techiman)
- Bubuashie Basement
- Bubiashie Surprising Stars
- Buduburam Children Better Ways
- Buduburam Enforcers FC
- Buduburam F.C. (Bendu)
- Buem United
- Busia Youth Academy

Biriwa Nkumisi FC}}

== C ==
- Cape Coast Ahly Rovers
- Cape Coast Bless F.C.
- Cape Coast Venomous Vipers
- Capital Sports
- Catholic Stars
- Ceoabs Babies
- Champions FC
- Charity Stars
- Cheetah FC
- Cheeter FC
- Chicago Babies
- Chippenham FC
- Christian Stars FC
- Cita FC
- Citadel FC
- Coaltar United
- Coastal Fauzan
- Comboni Stars F.C (Abor)
- Complex Stars of F.C.C. (Tema)
- Cornerstones (Kumasi)
- Corners Babies
- Cosmos FC
- Crystal Palace
- Comsports F.C (Maamobi-Accra)
- Cowlane Babies
- C.Y. FC

== D ==
- Dansoman Wise XI FC
- Datus Academy
- Dunamis FC
- Dawu Youngstars
- DC United (Agogo, Asante Akim)
- Debiso Royal Stars
- Deelorm Royals
- Dezac's Sporting Club (Kwashieman)
- Deelorm Stars
- Defence Stars
- Denkyira United (Dunkwa)
- Deportivo FC
- Dermaman
- Desailly Stars
- Desideries FC
- Desideros Babies
- Diamond Stars (Akwatia)
- Dixcove Sports Club (Dixcove)
- Dormaa Future Stars
- Dormaa Golden Academicals
- Dormaa Tottenham
- Drobo Barcelona
- Drobo Warriors
- Duesseldorf F.C.
- Dumas Boys of Ghana Textile Printing (Tema)
- Duwokpe F.C. Of Vakpo
- D'International FC
- Delali F.C (Battor)
- Dynamo FC (Ghana) Ho
- Dreams F.C. Greater Accra Region

== E ==
- Eagle Giants
- East Legon Academy
- Eastern Rovers F.C.(Koforidua, New Juaben)
- Ebony Academy
- Ebony International F.C.
- Ebusua Dwarfs
- Edumfa Galaxy F.C.
- Efutu Breku F.C.
- Efutu Citrus Professionals
- Efutu Super Stars
- Eguase Youngsters
- Ekuasi Proud United
- Ekumfi Ekotsi Great Wonders
- Ekumfi Proud United
- Ekumfi Otuamkese United F.C.
- El Ahly Adeiso
- Eleven Wise (Sekondi)
- Elmina Sharks F.C.
- Emmanuel City FC
- Envoys FC (Kumasi)
- Esbjerg Soccer Academy
- Etwe Awuruku FC
- Evaluwe Gwira F.C
- Evergreens F.C.
- Eyisam Lumumba Stars
- Ephesians F.C (Kumasi)
- Eleven Wonder (Tuobodom)
- Elite Skills soccer academy

== F ==
- F.C. Arsalah
- F.C. Barcelona (Kumasi)
- F.C. Berlin Brong Ahofu
- F.C. Dadekotopon
- F.C. Ever Green
- F.C. Medeamaa
- F.C. Midtjylland (Tema)
- F.C. Okyeman
- F.C. Supreme
- F.C. Tema
- F.C. Orca (Kwasheiman)
- F.C. Takoradi
- FC Tamale
- Fankobaa (Swedru)
- Famteakwa Colts
- Fanteakwa FC
- Farisco Stars
- Fauzan F.C.
- FCM Maamobi United
- Feed Us 123 F.C.
- Fenhack
- Fern Stars
- Feyenoord Academy (Gomoa Fetteh)
- Flamingos Mangoase
- Fransa FC
- Flying Jets FC
- Freedom Stars
- Friends Babies
- Frontiers

== G ==
- Galaxy United Football Club (Kwadaso - Kumasi)
- Gag Roos (Tarkwa)
- Gala Lords
- Gambia P.K.Boakye's Efritete Stars
- Gbawe Young Rangers
- Gbewaa F.C.
- Ghana Independence (Sekondi)
- Ghanacan (Nsawam)
- Ghana Armed Forces Youth Club
- Ghana Ports Authority (Tema)
- Ghapoha Readers (Tema)
- Genego FC
- Geowags FC
- Glantorian Academy
- Global FC
- GSP CLUB
- Global Soccer Academy
- Glory Stars FC
- GNA Sports
- Goaso Asunafo Missionaries
- Gold Bridge FC
- Golden Bus
- Golden Tulip FC
- Goldstar F.C.
- Gold Stars (Bibiani)
- Goldfields (Obuasi)
- Goaso Nananom FC
- Gomoa Adzintem Soccer Academy
- Gomoa Assin Hi-Kings FC
- Gomoa Akotsi Jaanak Professionals
- Gomoa Benso Gomoaman Dahlin
- Gomoa Fetteh Future Fighters FC
- Gomoa Fetteh Youngsters FC
- Gomoa Nyanyano Proud United
- Gomoa Nyanyano Super Sports
- Gomoa Obuasi Jonart F.C.
- Gomoaman Dortmund FC
- Gonden Boys
- Great Abaasa
- Great Afienya
- Great African United
- Great Afrikans FC
- Great Akans (Kadjebi)
- Great Ambassadors
- Great Ambition FC
- Great Arrow F.C.
- Great Asene United
- Great Ashanti (Kumasi)
- Great Ashantis
- Great Assin North United
- Great Breman Ochiso
- Great Breman United
- Great Buduburam F.C.
- Great Corinthians
- Great Eagles Colts F.C.
- Great Invincible football club
- Great Invincible professionals
- Great Odupong Hero
- Great Lions (Accra)
- Great Mariners
- Great Obiri Stars FC
- Great Olympics (Accra)
- Great Otuam United
- Great Otuamkese United
- Great Palmers
- Great Stars FC
- Great Uppers
- Great Warriors
- Goldfields Soccer Academy
- GS Obiri Stars
- Gyamfi Academy

== H ==
- Hamburg FC of Chiraa (Brong-Ahafo Region)
- Harbour Boys
- Hasaacas (Sekondi-Takoradi)
- Heart of Lions (Kpandu)
- Hearts Babies
- Hearts of Oak (Accra)
- Heroes F.C.
- Highlanders FC
- High-Kings FC (Agogo, Ashanti-Akim)
- Home Stars (Ho)
- Ho Mighty Eagles
- Ho Sunset
- Ho Area 51 F.C
- Ho Voradep
- Hot Steel FC
- Holy Stars (Techiman)
- Hwidiem Red Powers

== I ==
- Independence (Sekondi)
- Invincible Professionals FC (Accra)
- International Allies F.C.
- Inter Millas F.C.
- Iron Breakers F.C.
- Iron Fighters (Mpohor)

== J ==
- Jakpa Warriors
- Jancole Football Academy (Darkuman-Accra)
- Japekrom Auo Pru
- Jawara Babies
- Jen FC
- Jenaak Pro School
- Juantex F.C.
- Judy Bless
- Jukwa Surowi United
- Jinijini Jaffa United

== K ==
- K.F.C. Football Club
- K.W.A.M.A.X.
- K. Tumi Hirari
- Kade Hotspurs
- Kadjebi United (Kadjebi)
- Kaaseman F.C.
- Katara Football Club, Darkuman - Accra
- Kasoa 24/7 United FC
- Kasoa Amanfro God Is Great
- Kasoa Bago
- Kasoa Bagojet
- Kasoa (Fauzan)
- Kasoa Universal
- Ken Harrison Babies
- Kendis F.C.
- Kenstep
- Kenyasi Tano Ajax
- Kessben Academy
- Kessben (Prempeh)
- Keta Sandlanders Football Club
- Khalid FC
- Khalid Stars
- King Faisal Babes (Kumasi)
- King Harrison (Accra)
- King Solomon F.C. (Nkawkaw)
- Kingdoko
- Kings Step FC
- Kintampo United
- Kintampo Zamalek
- Koforidua (Greater Accra)
- Koftown F.C.
- Konsia Aston Villa
- Kotobabi Power Lines FC
- Kotoko Babies
- Kotoku Royals Academy (Akim Oda)
- Kpando F.C.
- Kramokrom Great Wonders
- Kratos F.C.
- Krofrom F.C.
- Kukuom Young Galazie
- Kumapim Stars
- Kumasi Barcelona Babies FC
- Kumasi Metro Stars
- Kumasi Real Madrid
- Kumasi Titanics
- Kumasi United
- Kutunse Great United
- Kwabayena Royals
- Kwabibirem FC
- Kwadjan Soccer Academy
- Kwaebibirem Fire Stars
- Kwamax FC

== L ==
- Lavanttal Academy
- Lepo Stars
- Liberty Babies Colts
- Liberty Babies FC
- Liberty Professional Academy
- Liberty Professionals (Accra)
- Liberty Rainbow
- Likpe F.C.
- Liverpool colts

== M ==
- Maabayer FC
- Maamobi Youth
- Madina United
- Madina Youth
- Magic Cannons FC
- Magic Stars Football Club (Dansoman)
- Manchester United (Accra)
- Mandela FC
- Mankessim Great Royalist
- Mankessim King Hussein
- Mankessim Striking Force
- Mankoadze Asaase FC
- Mariners FC
- Marlavans FC
- Maso FC
- Mau Mau FC
- Maxbees (Suhum)
- MBC Accra
- Medeama FC
- Mentwis Academy
- Metro SC
- Mexico Club
- MCFC Babies MCFC Babies] (Tamale)
- Michel Camp IX
- Microsoft FC
- Midtjylland Academy
- Mighty Eagles (Ho)
- Mighty Jets F.C.
- Mighty Krobo Youth
- Mighty Rocks
- Mighty Victory SC (Mamprobi-Accra)
- Mim Ayum FC
- Mim Freedom Fighters FC
- Miracle FC
- Mission Rangers
- Missionaries
- Mobile Phone People
- Moonlight
- Moree Great Astons
- Moree Nana Apreeku Rainbow
- Morin Stars (Navrongo)
- Motherland FC
- Mountaineers FC
- MŠK Žilina Africa FC
- Mystical Royals FC

== N ==
- Najman Club
- Nania F.C.
- NASCO International Sports Club Website
- Nanumba Nationals
- Neoplan F.C.
- Neoplan Stars (Bekwai)
- Network Football Academy
- New Edubiase United F.C.
- New Odona Schalke O4
- Nikwab Professionals
- Nimobi F.C (Maamobi-Accra)
- Nkaseim Young Africans
- Nkoranza Everton
- Nmai Djorn
- No Weapon F.C.
- Noble Harrics
- Norchip Sepe Timpom
- Northern United
- Nsoatreman FC
- Nsoatre stars FC(www.nsoatrestarsfc.com)
- Nungua FC
- Nungua United
- Nungua Wise
- Nyanyano Real Madrid
- Nyanyano Proud United
- Nyanyano Universal
- Nyenasin Real United
- Nsawam Soccer Legend FC
- Nsawam Young Liberty F/C
- Nzema Kotoko

== O ==
- Oblogo Nikwab Professionals
- Oblogo River Boyz
- Obooma F.C.
- Obuasi M.B.C. F.C.
- Obuotabiri (Koforidua)
- Odokor Kwashieman United
- Odomakoma MBA
- Odupong Stars
- Odupong Warriors
- Ofankor Great Odupon Heroes
- Ofaakor Shepherd Stars
- Ofie Youngsters
- Oguaa United
- Ogyinga Stars
- Ojobi Kaakyire Stars
- Oklibone Stars
- Okwaho Mountains
- Okwaho Youngsters
- Okwawu United
- Okyeman Youngsters
- Olympiakos A.C.
- One-World F.A.
- Opoku Ware SS School Team
- Oscar F.C. (Kpandu)
- Osika FC
- Osu Fortuna Düsseldorf
- Owareman
- Owerriman F.C.
- Owirenkyiman FC
- Oxy FC
* Okwawu City Soccer Academy

== P ==
- Paa Badu Babies
- Paa grant soccer academy (Takoradi)
- Palma F.C.
- Pan-African Soccer Academy (Cantonments))
- Panbros F.C.(Accra)
- Papao Sporting Club
- Partouche Casino FC
- Patience Stars
- Pauzan FC
- Peace Academy
- Perranks FC
- Perseverance Professionals FC (Accra)
- Perseverance Soccer Academy (Accra)
- Photizo Academy
- Photizo Afienya
- Planet F.C.
- Planners Athletic Club
- Pokuase United
- Police FC
- Power
- Prampram F.C.
- Prampram Mighty Royals
- Praso Akumpreko
- Prestea Mine Stars
- Premier Academy
- Previous ACA
- Prisco Minis
- Proline Soccer Academy
- Prostar Academy FC
- Pro Sports
- Proud United FC
- Pure Joy FC

== Q ==
- Queens Park Rangers (Tema)
- Quinta Trust Football Academy (Nungua)

== R ==
- Rainbow Football Academy (Kasoa)
- Rainbow Stars
- Rangers Nil FC Sport
- Real Essiam United
- Real Raskid United
- Real Republicans (Accra)
- Real Sportive (Tema)
- Real Tigers (Koforidua)
- Real Tamale United (Tamale)
- Red Bull Academy
- Right to Dream Academy
- Road Banks
- Road Masters
- Roadmasters (Tema)
- Rock Mountain F.C.
- Rospak S.C.
- Rot Weiss FC (Accra)
- Rot-Weiss S.C. (Awudome Estates)
- Rot-Weiss Soccer Academy
- Republicans F. C. (Galilea- Accra)
- Royal Knights F.C.

== S ==
- S.C. Adelaide
- S.S. 1974
- Sadisco Academy
- Sagomens FC
- Sagroos Accra
- Sahara Babies
- Salami F.C.
- Salgado F.C.
- Saltpond Brondby F.C.
- Saltpond Kampsite F.C.
- Saltpond Mighty Victory
- Saltpond N.I.C.P.S.D.
- Saltpond Redevelopment F.C.
- Samartex F.C. (Samreboi)
- Sampa Frontier Stars
- Samp Doria FC
- Samvito FC
- Sanahene Academy
- Sandlers F.C.
- Saint Stars FC
- Saraphina SA
- Sawla United
- Savannah Stars (Tamale)
- Schalke 04 (Nyankomase)
- Score FC (Abiriw-Akuapem)
- Sekondi Hasaacas
- Semereka FC
- Senior Fresh FC
- Senya Bereku URB
- Senya Soccer Professionals
- SG San Saints
- Shaggy FC
- Sharp Rangers
- Shelter Force FC
- Shooting Stars
- Space FC (Sunyani)
- Soccer Ambassador
- Soccer Attitude
- Soccer Intellectuals
- Soccer Learners
- Soccer Mercenaries
- Soccer Millionaires
- Soccer Miniare
- Soccer Missionaries (Fosu)
- Soccer Wise (Enchi)
- Soklin
- Somanya Rainbow Stars
- Spartans Football Club
- Sportnet F.C.
- Sporting Club Accra (Kwashieman)
- St. Mirren (Indadfa)
- St. Stars
- Stadium Youth
- Standfast Babies (Accra)
- Show Boys
- State Envoys
- State Traders (Tema)
- Stay Cool Dansoman Professionals
- Stay Cool Babes
- Subway FC
- Suhum FC
- Suhum United
- Suker FC
- Suncity FC
- Sunyani Bectero
- Sunyani Soccer Stars
- Super Dragons
- Super Stars F.C.
- Supreme FC
- Surgicals F.C.
- Surprising Stars
- Susu (Biribi)
- Susubiribi Academy
- Senior Boys F.C (Taifa)

== T ==
- T.I Amass
- Taifa Super Wonders
- Takyimang Gold Stars
- Talons FC (Odumasi-Krobo)
- Tamale All Stars
- Tamale Savana Stars
- Tarkwa Gold Stars
- Tarkwa Real United
- Tarkwa United (Tarkwa)
- Tarkwa Gold Stars
- Techiman Rovers (Techiman)
- Techiman Roving Rovers
- Techiman Universal Stars
- Tema FC
- Tema City FC
- Tema Ghapoha
- Tema Harbour City
- Tema Hurricanes
- Tema Young Hearts
- Tema Young Schweppes
- Tema Youth
- Tepa Evergreen
- Teran FC
- The Invincibles
- Thika United
- Todd Babies
- Tom Vernon Academy
- Tongu Fruits F.C.
- Topsymore (Sunyani)
- Top Ten Football Academy (Madina, Accra)
- Trinity Professionals F.C. (Mankessim)
- Trax Juniors F.C. (Darkuman)
- Trojans FC (Spintex Road Baatsonaa)
- Tuba Metro Stars
- Tudu Mighty Jets (Accra)
- Tumu Soccer Youth
- Tuobodom Red Lions
- Twifo Praso Noble
- Twimeso Celtic
- Tuobodom Sandy

== U ==
- Ultimate Choice
- Ultimate Stars Football Club
- Ultimate Soccer Academy
- Uniguard
- Union Sporting Academy
- United FC (Deduako)
- United Babies FC. (Walewale)
- Unity Sporting Club (Wenchi)
- Universal Soccer Academy
- Upper Stars
- Upper West Heroes
- Unistar Soccer Academy (Odupong Ofaakor)

== V ==
- V.O.A. FC
- V.R. Royals F.C. (Aflao)
- Vasajam
- Venomous Vipers (Cape Coast)
- Vibe Juapong
- Vision F.C. (Madina)
- Vision Soccer Academy
- Volta Great Barons F.C.
- Volta Heroes
- Volta Juantex
- Volta Rangers
- Volta United
- Volta Warriors
- Villas Athletics FC (Accra, Burma Camp)
- Voradep (Ho)

== W ==
- Wa FC (Wa)
- Wa Real United
- Wa United
- Wa Veterans
- Wamfie Great Mansen
- Wasaaman F.C.
- Weavers F.C. (Agbozume)
- Wegan F.C. (Hohoe)
- Wenchi Heroes FC
- West Ham United (Kumasi)
- West Prime Platinum FC (Accra Atomic/Dome)
- Westlands FC
- Westlandies FC
- Wetlands FC
- White Eagles (Ayigya)
- White Wolves F.C.
- Windy Professionals F.C.
- Winneba Cecil Hunters
- Winneba Soccer Intellectuals
- Winneba Sports College
- Wisdom Academy
- Wise Babies
- Walewale Catholic Stars FC
- Wamfie Great Mansen
- Wuogon FC

== Z ==
- Zamalek F.C. (Takoradi)
- Zaytuna (Accra)
- Zongo JS
- Zoom F.C.
- Zurak FC
- Zum FC
- Zein United FC
- Zinaps Fc

== Ghana (Women) Clubs ==
- Abrem Super Blessing Ladies
- Abura Dunkwa Real Maiden Ladies
- Ada Ladies
- Akyawkrom Washington View
- Ampem Darko Ladies
- Ash Town Ladies
- Ashaiman Ladies
- Assin Foso Betinsin Ladies
- Assin North Ladies
- Athleta Ladies
- Bafana Ladies
- Berry Ladies (formerly Halifax Ladies)
- Blessed Ladies (Kasoa)
- Bubiashie Starlets Ladies
- Cape Coast Ghatel Ladies
- Coegan Ladies
- Comsport Ladies FC
- Cosmos Ladies
- Dreamz Ladies FC
- Dynamo FC Ladies (Ho)
- Elmina Bafana Ladies
- Envoys Ladies
- Fabulous Ladies
- Dansoman Faith Ladies F.C. (Accra)
- Ghatel F.C. Tamale
- GHATEL Ladies
- Ghatel Ladies (Kumasi)
- Ghatel Ladies (Sunyani)
- Ghatel Ladies of Accra
- GHATEL Ladies of Takoradi
- God's Kingdom Ladies
- Goldfields Ladies
- Great Mawuena Ladies
- Hasaacas Ladies
- Ideal Ladies
- Immigration Accra
- Impregnable Tesano Ladies
- Konongo Missiles Ladies
- Kumasi Sports Academy Ladies
- La Ladies
- Lepo Stars Ladies FC
- Madonna Ladies
- Mawuena FC
- Meridia Ladies
- Northern Ladies
- Oforikrom Ladies
- Olympique Marseille Ladies
- Osei Tutu Ladies
- Peki Ladies
- Pearl Pia Ladies
- Police Accra
- Police Ladies (Kumasi)
- Police Ladies F.C. (Ghana)
- Port Ladies
- Post Ladies
- Real Meridian Ladies
- Reformers Sunyani
- Right to Dream SA
- Rock Ladies
- Sharp Arrows Ladies
- Simew New Castles
- Soccer Intellectuals Ladies
- Starlets Ladies
- Super Fire (Bekwai)
- Super Lions Ladies FC
- Supreme Ladies FC
- Takoradi Ghatel Ladies
- Tema Bluna Ladies
- Tema Zion Ladies
- Tesano Ladies
- Western Ladies
- Valued Girls FC
