= Yaw Amankwah Mireku =

Ghanaian footballer

Yaw Mireku
Personal information
- Full name: Yaw Amankwah Mireku
- Date of birth: 25 November 1979 (age 46)
- Place of birth: Accra, Ghana
- Position: Centre-back

Senior career*
Years	Team	Apps	(Gls)
1997–2007	Hearts of Oak		
2007	Viva Kerala		
2008	Pure Joy Stars		
2009	All Stars F.C.		

International career
2001–2005	Ghana	15	(0)
- * Club domestic league appearances and goals

Yaw Amankwah Mireku (born 25 November 1979) is a Ghanaian former professional footballer who played as a centre-back. He was part of the 64 battalion team of Hearts of Oak, they won the 2000 CAF Champions League and 2004 CAF Confederation Cup.

== Club career ==
Born in Accra, Amankwah began his career with Hearts of Oak and was the team captain. After ten years with Hearts of Oak he left to sign with I-League team Viva Kerala on 12 June 2007. In January 2008 he signed a contract with Poly Tank Division One League side Pure Joy Stars. Mireku left Pure Joy Stars after eleven months and signed with Ghana Premier League club All Stars F.C. in December 2008.

== International career ==
Mireku played for the Black Stars 16 games from 2001 to 2005. He played his first game for the Black Stars on 11 March 2001 against Nigeria national football team.

== Honours ==
Hearts of Oak

- Ghana Premier League: 1997–98, 1999, 2000, 2001, 2002, 2004, 2006–07
- Ghanaian FA Cup: 1999, 2000
- Ghana Super Cup: 1997, 1998
