= Frederick Acheampong =

Ghanaian football administrator

Ghana Football Association Executive Council member
- In office October 24, 2019 – October 23, 2023

Personal details
- Born: Frederick Owusu Amankwah Acheampong; 30 October 1978 (age 47) Cape Coast, Ghana

Frederick Owusu Amankwah Acheampong also known as Fred Achee is a Ghanaian football administrator and media personality who is currently a member of the Ghana Football Association's Executive Council. He is currently a General Coordinator for the Confederation of African Football.

From a media background Acheampong built his capacity in Ghanaian football administration as he served as a football journalist and pundit in Kumasi on Kessben FM. In 2014 he was appointed to serve on the management of Ghanaian club New Edubiase United and contested for a slot on the Ghana Football Association's Executive Committee a year later. He polled 6 votes out of the available 16 and failed to win one of the available six seats for the Premier League on the committee. Meanwhile in April 2018 he was named the chief executive officer for Ghanaian Premier League club Ashanti Gold SC. In March 2019, he was appointed Assistant General Coordinator for the CAF Champions League final first leg in Rabat as Wydad Casablanca hosted Esperance.

== Career ==
=== Club administration ===
Acheampong first ventured into club football administration in Ghana when he left mainstream media to become a management member of then Ghana Premier League side New Edubiase United in 2014. However after two seasons with the club he left and returned to mainstream media. In 2018 he was appointed as the CEO of Ashanti Gold SC following the takeover of the club by Ghanaian businessman Dr Kwaku Frimpong. However he resigned from the position in April 2020 after spending two years at the office.

=== GFA Council ===
In 2015, he contested for a Ghana Football Association executive committee position but lost out to George Afriyie, Albert Commey, Samuel Opoku Nti, Frank Nelson, Delali Eric Senaye and Benjamin Eyison, who won the six seats available for Premier League clubs on the executive committee. In September 2019 he announced his candidacy for the position again. On October 24, 2019 he was elected to represent Ghana Premier League clubs on the committee after securing the required number of votes. In September 2020 he insisted the Ghanaian football governing body was under pressure to ensure the resumption of football in the West African country after the ban on contact sports was lifted by the government of the Republic of Ghana. After resigning from his position as CEO of AshantiGold SC, some media reports claimed some clubs in the Ghana Premier League wanted him removed from the executive council since he no longer represents any Premier League club on the council. In January 2020, he was named the vice chairman of the Ghana Football Association's international relations committee, which is chaired by Ghana FA president Kurt Okraku. In August 2019 he was appointed to serve on a three-man ad hoc committee that was tasked by the Ghana FA to work with two consultants to put together a strategic business plan for the federation and also a document on the contribution of football to Ghana’s GDP. He is also currently the chairman for the Ghana FA's referees assessors and classification panel.

=== CAF ===
In June 2019 he was appointed as an Assistant General Coordinator for the 30 June Stadium in Cairo for the 2019 Africa Cup of Nations. In December of that same year he was appointed by the continent's football governing body to act as the General Match Coordinator for the CAF Champions League game between Egyptian club Zamalek SC and Angolan side Primeiro de Agosto which was staged in the Al Salam Stadium in Cairo. In June 2020, he was reportedly awarded by the United Nations for 'Gold Star Order of the Face of the Globe (2019-2021)' according to Ghanaian media giants Daily Graphic. But, the credibility of the award was called into question as many raised eyebrows over the authenticity of the award.
