= Dynamo FC =

Dynamo FC or Dinamo FC may refer to several association football clubs worldwide.

== Africa ==
- Benin:
  - Dynamo Abomey F.C.
- Ghana:
  - Ho Dynamo FC
- Seychelles:
  - Northern Dynamo FC
- South Africa:
  - Dynamos F.C. (South Africa)
- Zambia:
  - Power Dynamos F.C.
- Zimbabwe:
  - Dynamos F.C.

== Asia ==
- India:
  - Delhi Dynamos FC
- Kyrgyzstan:
  - Dordoi-Dynamo Naryn
- Tajikistan:
  - Dynamo Dushanbe
- Uzbekistan:
  - FK Samarqand-Dinamo

== Europe ==
- Albania:
  - FK Dinamo Tirana
- Belarus:
  - FC Dinamo Minsk
  - FC Dynamo Brest
- Croatia:
  - HNK Cibalia, formerly NK Dinamo Vinkovci
  - GNK Dinamo Zagreb
- Cyprus:
  - Dynamo Pervolion
- Czech Republic:
  - SK Dynamo České Budějovice
- England:
  - Shepshed Dynamo F.C.
  - Loughborough Dynamo F.C.
- Estonia:
  - Dünamo Tallinn
- Georgia:
  - FC Dinamo Tbilisi
  - FC Dinamo Batumi
- Germany:
  - Berliner FC Dynamo
  - SG Dynamo Dresden
  - SV Dynamo
  - SC Dynamo Berlin
  - SG Dynamo Hohenschönhausen
- Hungary
  - Újpesti Dózsa
- Ireland:
  - Tralee Dynamos A.F.C.
- Latvia:
  - FK Dinamo-Rīnuži/LASD
- Moldova:
  - FC Dinamo-Auto Tiraspol
  - FC Dinamo Bender
- Romania:
  - FC Dinamo București
  - FC Dinamo Bacău
  - FC Dinamo Pitești
- Russia:
  - FC Dynamo Barnaul
  - FC Dynamo Bryansk
  - FC Dynamo Kemerovo
  - FC Dynamo Kirov
  - FC Dynamo Kostroma
  - FC Dynamo Makhachkala
  - FC Dynamo Moscow
  - FC Dynamo Omsk
  - FC Dynamo Perm
  - FC Dynamo Saint Petersburg
  - FC Dynamo Stavropol
  - FC Dynamo Tula
  - FC Dynamo Vologda
  - FC Dynamo Voronezh
- Serbia:
  - FK Dinamo Pančevo
  - FK Dinamo Vranje
  - SU Dinamo Jug
- Ukraine:
  - FC Dynamo Bila Tserkva, now FC Ros' Bila Tserkva
  - FC Dynamo Chernihiv, now FC Desna Chernihiv
  - FC Dynamo Chortkiv, now FC Krystal Chortkiv
  - FC Dynamo Irpin, now FC Ros' Bila Tserkva
  - FC Dynamo Kharkiv
  - FC Dynamo Khmelnytskyi
  - FC Dynamo Kirovohrad, now FC Zirka Kirovohrad
  - FC Dynamo Kyiv
    - FC Dynamo-2 Kyiv
    - FC Dynamo-3 Kyiv
  - FC Dynamo Luhansk
  - FC Dynamo Odesa, now FC Chornomorets Odesa
  - FC Dynamo Saky
  - FC Dynamo Simferopol, now FC Ihroservice Simferopol
- Wales:
  - Pentwyn Dynamo F.C.

== North America ==
- United States:
  - Carolina Dynamo
  - Houston Dynamo
  - Denver Dynamos (defunct)

== Oceania ==
- Australia:
  - Saint Albans Dinamo
