= Paa Grant Soccer Academy =

Paa Grant SA
- Full name: Paa Grant Soccer Academy
- Nickname(s): PGSA
- Founded: January 2009
- Owner: (England) (Ghana) Kim Tyrone Grant
- Coach: (Ghana) William Yaw Quansah
- League: GAFCOA
Home colours	Away colours

Paa Grant Soccer Academy is a Ghanaian association football club and academy based in Sekondi-Takoradi, Ghana. They are a competing in the GAFCOA.

== History ==
The team was founded in 2009 in honour of George Alfred (Paa) Grant, by his grandson Kim Tyrone Grant, a former Black Stars member and England legionnaire. Paa Grant Soccer Academy is the reserve and youth team of F.C. Takoradi.

== Paa Grant Soccer Academy Management ==
Owner & President	(Ghana) Mr Kim Tyrone Grant
General Manager	(Ghana) Mr Ahmed Osei TUTU
Academy Manager	(Ghana) Mr William Y.QUANSAH
Communications	(Ghana) Mr Daniel B. ANSAH
Welfare Officer	(Ghana) Mr William Y.QUANSAH

== Paa Grant Soccer Academy Technical Staff ==
Academy Technical & Sporting Director	(Ghana) Mr Kim Tyrone Grant
Academy Team Coach	(Ghana) Mr William Y. QUANSAH
Assisting Academy Coach	(Ghana) Mr Daniel B. ANSAH
Academy Goalkeeping Coach	(Ghana) Vacant
Academy Physiotherapist	(Ghana) Vacant
Academy Team Doctor	(Ghana) Vacant
Academy Kit Manager	(Ghana) Vacant

== Paa Grant Soccer Academy U16 – 2011 ==
Note: Flags indicate national team as defined under FIFA eligibility rules; some limited exceptions apply. Players may hold more than one non-FIFA nationality.

No.	Pos.	Nation	Player
—	GK	(Ghana) GHA	Francis Mensah
—	GK	(Ghana) GHA	Mathew Aidoo
—	DF	(Ghana) GHA	Augustine Ampong
—	DF	(Ghana) GHA	Cosmos Awotwe
—	DF	(Ghana) GHA	—
—	DF	(Ghana) GHA	—
—	DF	(Ghana) GHA	—
—	DF	(Ghana) GHA	—
—	MF	(Ghana) GHA	Richard Senadjo
—	MF	(Ghana) GHA	Michael Ernest Brew
—	MF	(Ghana) GHA	Alexandre Ofori Mantey
—	MF	(Ghana) GHA	—
—	MF	(Ghana) GHA	—
—	MF	(Ghana) GHA	—
—	FW	(Ghana) GHA	Jonathane Abban
—	FW	(Ghana) GHA	Micheal Nartey
—	FW	(Ghana) GHA	—
—	FW	(Ghana) GHA	—

== Paa Grant Soccer Academy U14 – 2011 ==
Note: Flags indicate national team as defined under FIFA eligibility rules; some limited exceptions apply. Players may hold more than one non-FIFA nationality.

No.	Pos.	Nation	Player
—	GK	(Ghana) GHA	Francis Mensah
—	GK	(Ghana) GHA	—
—	DF	(Ghana) GHA	Anass Kasimu
—	DF	(Ghana) GHA	—
—	DF	(Ghana) GHA	—
—	DF	(Ghana) GHA	—
—	DF	(Ghana) GHA	—
—	DF	(Ghana) GHA	—
—	MF	(Ghana) GHA	Paul Arthur Jnr.
—	MF	(Ghana) GHA	—
—	MF	(Ghana) GHA	—
—	MF	(Ghana) GHA	—
—	MF	(Ghana) GHA	—
—	MF	(Ghana) GHA	—
—	FW	(Ghana) GHA	—
—	FW	(Ghana) GHA	Benjiman Quansah
—	FW	(Ghana) GHA	—
—	FW	(Ghana) GHA	—
