= Union Rovers =

- Full name: Union Rovers
- Ground: Ghana
- League: Division One League Zone 1B

Union Rovers is a Ghanaian professional football team that plays in the 1B Zone of the Ghana Division One League. Zone 1A has seven competing teams from the part of the Ashanti Region, Brong Ahafo Region and the three Northern Regions of Ghana.
