= Emmanuel Agyemang-Badu =

Ghanaian footballer (born 1990)

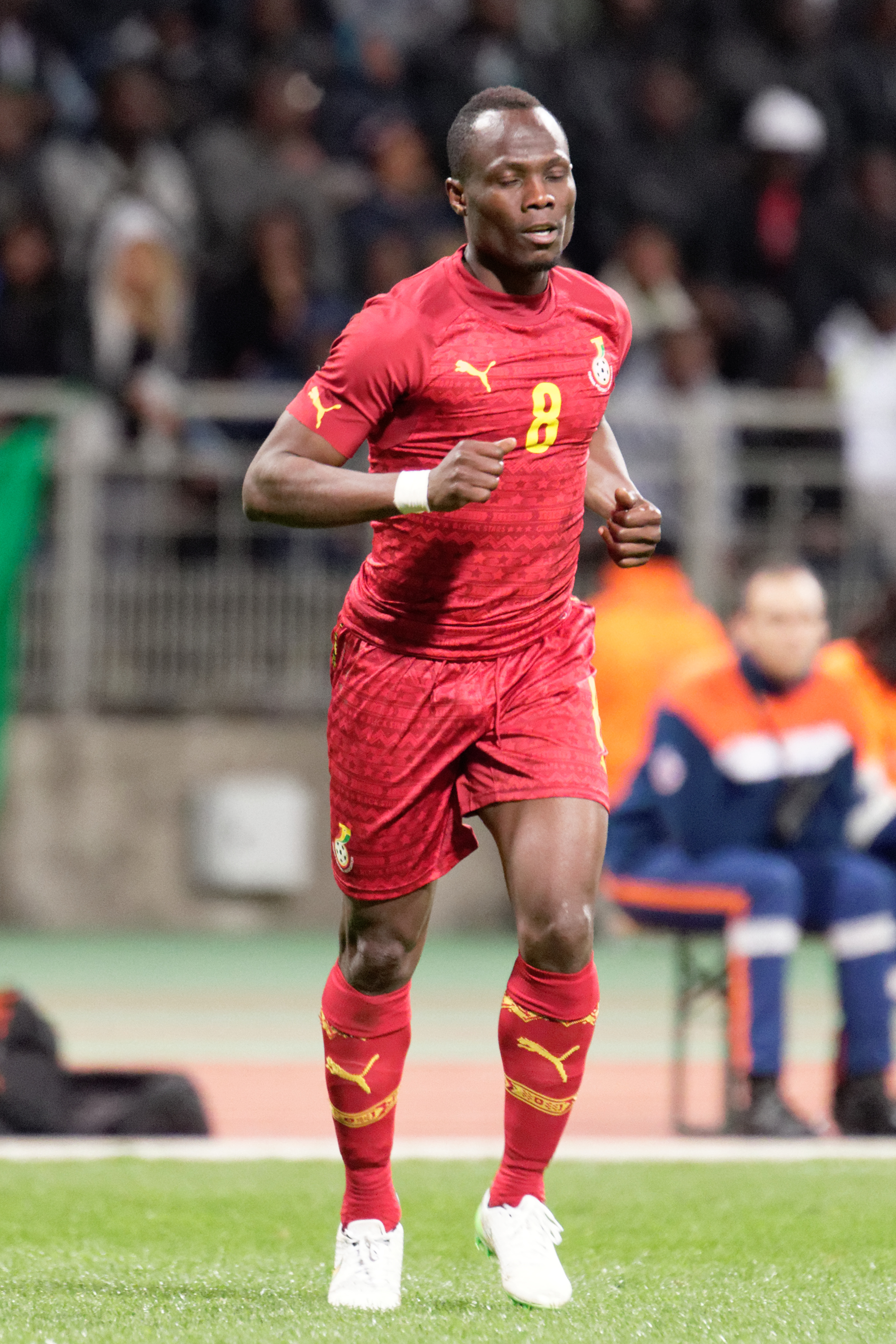
- Badu with Ghana in 2015

Personal information
- Full name: Emmanuel Agyemang-Badu
- Date of birth: 2 December 1990 (age 35)
- Place of birth: Berekum, Ghana
- Height: 1.72 m (5 ft 8 in)
- Position: Midfielder

Youth career
- 1997–2006: Berlin F.C.
- 2006–2007: Berekum Arsenal

Senior career*
Years	Team	Apps	(Gls)
2007–2009	Berekum Arsenal	19	(7)
2008–2009	→ Asante Kotoko (loan)	18	(2)
2009	→ Recreativo (loan)	22	(1)
2010–2020	Udinese	170	(10)
2017–2018	→ Bursaspor (loan)	18	(1)
2019–2020	→ Verona (loan)	10	(0)
2020–2021	Verona	0	(0)
2021–2022	Qingdao FC	4	(0)
2022–2023	Accra Great Olympics	11	(0)

International career^{‡}
2009	Ghana U20	7	(0)
2008–2017	Ghana	78	(11)
Medal record
Representing Ghana
Men's football
Africa Cup of Nations
Runner-up	2010 Angola
Runner-up	2015 Equatorial Guinea
FIFA U-20 World Cup
Winner	2009 Egypt
Africa U-20 Cup of Nations
Winner	2009 Rwanda
- * Club domestic league appearances and goals as of 9 December 2022 ‡ National team caps and goals as of 30 December 2017

Emmanuel Agyemang-Badu (born 2 December 1990), known mononymously as Badu (/bɑːˈduː/ bah-DOO), is a Ghanaian former professional footballer who played as a midfielder. He earned 78 caps for the Ghana national team.

== Club career ==
=== Early career ===
Born in Berekum, Bono Region, Badu began his career at a local club Berlin F.C. before later signing for Berekum Arsenal. Badu was announced in the Ghana Premier League All Star Team on 21 May 2007.

On 11 July 2008, Badu left Berekum Arsenal, signing a one-year loan contract with Asante Kotoko.

Badu had trials in England with Middlesbrough in August 2008 and at Wolverhampton Wanderers three months later.

Badu then signed on 16 April 2009, a six-month loan contract with Recreativo de Huelva, on loan from Berlin FC. Reuters quoted a source from a Berlin FC official, that the loan cost Recreativo about €30,000 (US$40,000), while Associated Press reported his new club holds an option for a contract between 30 June 2012 and the loan would be effective until the opening of 2009 summer transfer window. His contract with the Spanish club Recreativo de Huelva was dissolved in September 2009 and he moved back to Asante Kotoko.

=== Udinese ===
In November 2009, BBC and Sky Sports announced the Italian Serie A side Udinese Calcio would sign Badu in January 2010 and on 28 January 2010, the Udine club announced on its official site the permanent signing of the player from Berlin FC. Badu received his first team call-up against A.C. Milan on 12 February, but did not play. After a successive "appearances" as unused sub, he replaced Paolo Sammarco on 28 March 2010 against Fiorentina, which Udinese lost 1–4.

Badu became a regular in 2011–12 season, replacing departed Gökhan Inler in new 4–1–4–1 or 4–4–1–1 formation against Arsenal. Badu was one of the cover of attacking midfielder Giampiero Pinzi along with countryman, Kwadwo Asamoah.

In August 2017, he joined Turkish Süper Lig club Bursaspor on loan for the 2017–18 season. He was injured whilst on loan, and returned to first-team action with Udinese in March 2019, after 11 months out.

=== Verona ===
On 13 July 2019, Badu signed to Hellas Verona on loan with an obligation to buy. He was hospitalised in August with blood clots on his lungs, but was cleared to play in December 2019. He featured in 10 matches on loan at the club.

After the 2019–20 season Hellas Verona activated their obligation to sign him on a two-year deal from Udinese after playing for the Udine-based club for 10 years and playing in 193 matches in all competitions, scoring 10 times and making 11 assists. He was not included in Verona's 2020–21 Serie A squad. On 2 January 2021, he announced that he terminated his Verona contract and retired from playing.

=== Great Olympics ===
In July 2022, 13 years after playing in the Ghana Premier League, Badu made a return to the league and signed for Nungua-based club Accra Great Olympics as a free agent. He signed a one-year deal with the club ahead of the 2022–23 season. He made his debut on 17 August 2022 against Bechem United, in a 5–4 penalties loss after a goalless draw in regulation time in the 2022 GHALCA G6.

He played in all matches as Olympics went on to win the GHALCA G6 at the end of the tournament after defeating Bechem United by 2–0 in the final. On 9 September 2022, a day to the commencement of the league, he was officially unveiled by the club. After a remarkable five-month tenure, during which he participated in 11 league games and earned the prestigious Man of the Match award twice, he bid farewell to Olympics.

== International career ==
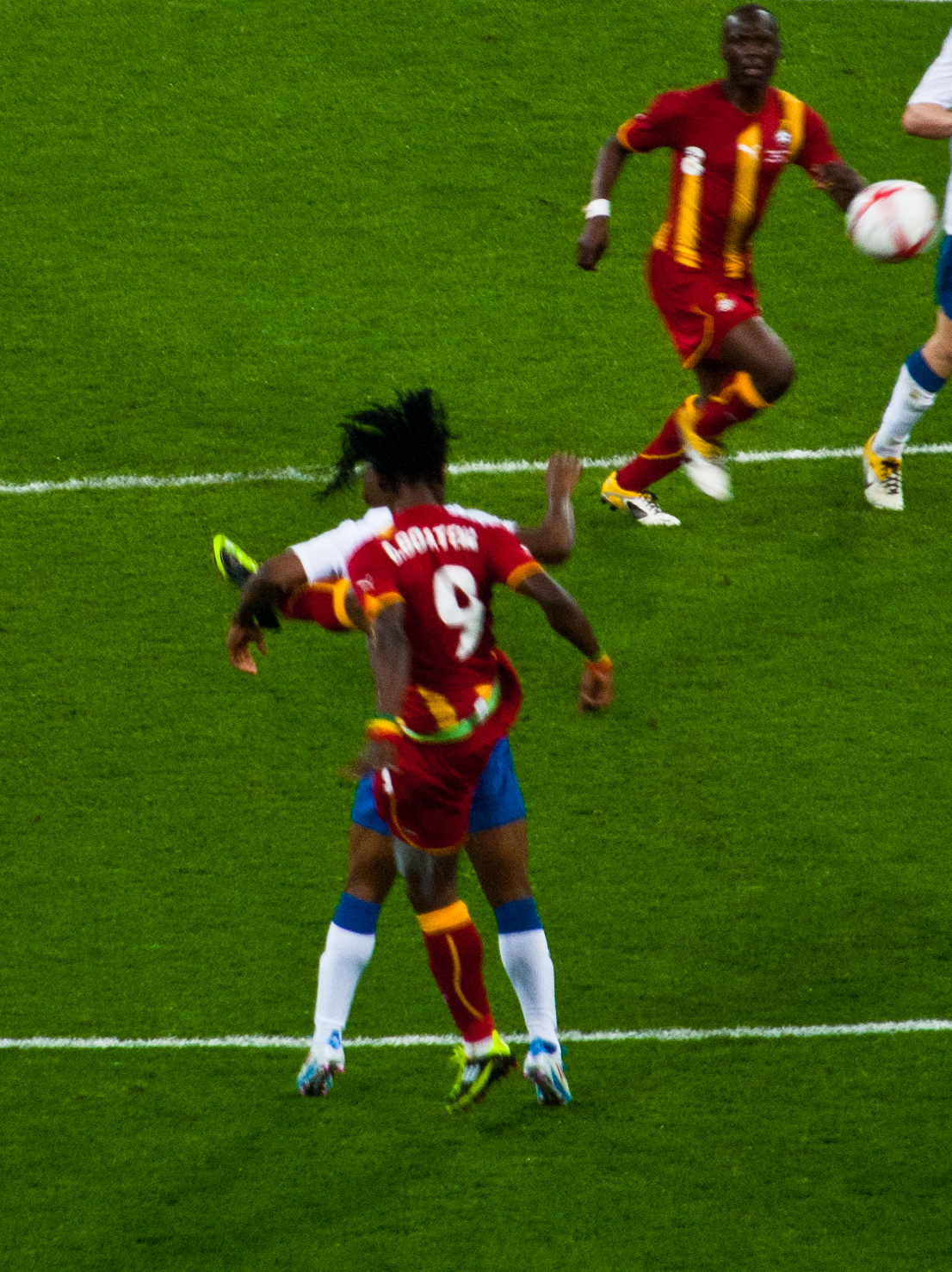
Badu (number 8, top right) in action for the Ghana national team against England in 2011

Badu has represented Ghana at under-20, under-23 and senior level. On 22 May 2008, he received his first call-up to the Black Stars. Badu's first senior international appearance came on 8 June 2008 against Lesotho and his first goal against Congo in June 2011.

=== Youth career ===
On 1 January 2009, he was named in the Black Satellites squad for the 2009 African Youth Championship in Rwanda. Badu played for the Black Stars' domestic based team at the 2009 African Championship of Nations in Côte d'Ivoire and represented his team at 2009 FIFA U-20 World Cup in Egypt.

Badu scored the winning sudden penalty kick on 16 October 2009 in the 2009 FIFA U-20 World Cup final against Brazil. The penalty made Ghana the first African nation to win the FIFA U-20 World Cup.

=== Senior career ===
In 2010, Badu was selected for his first Africa Cup of Nations as the Black Stars finished runners-up to Egypt, and went on to appear in the 2012 and 2013 editions of the tournament, with the team twice recording fourth-placed finishes.

During the 2012 Africa Cup of Nations, in a group match between Ghana and Guinea, Badu flipped up a teammate's pass from just outside the penalty area and launched a mid-air volley to score a goal that was later nominated for the 2012 FIFA Puskás Award (FIFA's global Goal of the Year award).

After missing the 2010 FIFA World Cup through injury, Badu was selected in Ghana's squad for the 2014 tournament.

== Personal life ==
Emmanuel Agyeman-Badu hails from Seikwa, Bono Region of the Republic of Ghana. He speaks his native language, Koulango, as well as Twi and English. He had his primary and junior high school education at the Seikwa Roman Catholic School and continued at the Nkoranman Senior High School, also at Seikwa. His brother Nana Agyemang-Badu plays for Asante Kotoko. Badu is the nephew of Asiedu Nketia. He is married to Regiatta Affua Arthur.

== Career statistics ==
As of matches played on 15 July 2019

Appearances and goals by national team and year
National team	Year	Apps	Goals
Ghana	2008	3	0
Ghana	2009	3	0
Ghana	2010	11	0
Ghana	2011	10	3
Ghana	2012	6	1
Ghana	2013	14	3
Ghana	2014	8	3
Ghana	2015	11	1
Ghana	2016	7	0
Ghana	2017	5	0
Total		78	11

Scores and results list Ghana's goal tally first, score column indicates score after each Agyemang-Badu goal.

List of international goals scored by Emmanuel Agyemang-Badu
No.	Date	Venue	Opponent	Score	Result	Competition	Ref.
1	3 June 2011	Baba Yara Stadium, Kumasi, Ghana	Congo	3–1	3–1	2012 Africa Cup of Nations qualification	
2	2 September 2011	Accra Sports Stadium, Accra, Ghana	Swaziland	2–0	2–0	2012 Africa Cup of Nations qualification	
3	15 November 2011	Stade Municipal, Saint-Leu-la-Forêt, France	Gabon	1–0	2–1	Friendly	
4	1 February 2012	Stade de Franceville, Franceville, Gabon	Guinea	1–0	1–1	2012 Africa Cup of Nations	
5	10 January 2013	Mohammed Bin Zayed Stadium, Abu Dhabi, United Arab Emirates	Egypt	1–0	3–0	Friendly	
6	20 January 2013	Nelson Mandela Bay Stadium, Port Elizabeth, South Africa	DR Congo	1–0	2–2	2013 Africa Cup of Nations	
7	24 March 2013	Baba Yara Stadium, Kumasi, Ghana	Sudan	4–0	4–0	2014 FIFA World Cup qualification	
8	10 September 2014	Stade de Kégué, Lomé, Togo	Togo	2–1	3–2	2015 Africa Cup of Nations qualification	
9	15 October 2014	Accra Sports Stadium, Accra, Ghana	Guinea	3–1	3–1	2015 Africa Cup of Nations qualification	
10	31 March 2015	Stade Sébastien Charléty, Paris, France	Mali	1–0	1–1	Friendly	

== Honours ==
Asante Kotoko

- Ghana Premier League: 2007–2008

Great Olympics

- GHALCA G6: 2022

Ghana U-20

- African Youth Championship: 2009
- FIFA U-20 World Cup: 2009

Ghana

- Africa Cup of Nations Silver Medal: 2010, 2015
