= David Addy =

Ghanaian international footballer

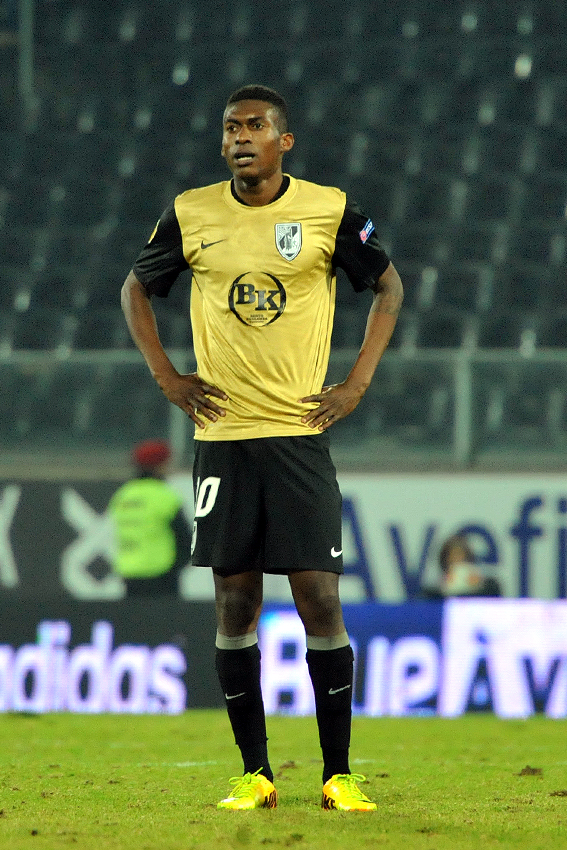
- Addy playing in the Europa League

Personal information
- Full name: David Nii Addy
- Date of birth: 21 February 1990 (age 36)
- Place of birth: Prampram, Greater Accra, Ghana
- Height: 1.83 m (6 ft 0 in)
- Position: Left back

Youth career
- Adelaide
- Inter Allies

Senior career*
Years	Team	Apps	(Gls)
2005–2008	Inter Allies		
2005–2007	→ All Stars (loan)		
2008–2010	Randers	20	(0)
2010–2012	Porto	1	(0)
2010–2011	→ Académica de Coimbra (loan)	14	(2)
2011–2012	→ Panetolikos (loan)	25	(1)
2012–2014	Vitória de Guimarães	50	(2)
2014–2015	Waasland-Beveren	27	(0)
2016–2017	Delhi Dynamos	6	(0)
2017	RoPS	15	(1)
2017	Riga	1	(0)
2019–2020	Ilves	19	(0)
2022	Tammeka Tartu	25	(1)

International career^{‡}
2009	Ghana U-20	14	(0)
2008–2014	Ghana	21	(0)
- * Club domestic league appearances and goals as of 20 October 2019 ‡ National team caps and goals as of 15 November 2012

David Nii Addy (born 21 February 1990) is a Ghanaian footballer.

== Club career ==
=== Randers ===
In Summer 2008, Addy made his first international move to Europe, from a Ghanaian Club – International Allies FC being signed by Danish SAS Ligaen club Randers FC. At Randers FC, Addy made his debut on 19 October against Vejle gaining 7 minutes.

In the following season, Addy was part of the Randers FC squad that went to compete in the UEFA Europa League. He also made his debut in the UEFA Europa League, in the first qualifying round against Linfield FC from Northern Ireland on 2 July 2009.

=== Porto ===
On 1 February 2010 the Ghanaian U-20 champion joined Portuguese top club FC Porto from SAS Ligaen side Randers FC for €800,000, signing a 3^{1}/_{2} year contract.

The young Ghanaian U-20 made his debut for FC Porto on 14 April 2010 in a 4–0 Victory against Rio Ave FC.

=== Académica de Coimbra ===
In July 2010, he joined Académica de Coimbra on a season-long loan from Portuguese club FC Porto.

=== Panetolikos ===
On 31 August 2011, he joined a newly promoted Super League Greece side Panetolikos F.C. on a season-long loan from Porto.

=== Vitória S.C. ===
On 30 September 2012, Addy signed a two-year deal for Vitória S.C. In May 2013 Addy helped Vitória S.C. win the 2012/13 Taca de Portugal and qualified for the 2013/14 UEFA Europa League. Addy had 4 successful UEFA Europa League appearances against Real Betis, Olympic Lyon and Rijeka. Vitoria S.C finished third in Group I and made an early exit from the competition.

=== Waasland-Beveren ===
In August 2014 Addy signed a 2-year deal with Belgian Pro League club Waasland-Beveren.

Addy has also had experience in the past few years playing in Asia and Scandinavia most recently helping Ilves to win the domestic cup in Finland and also securing a Europa league place.

=== Riga ===
He terminated his contract with Riga FC in November 2017.

== International career ==
=== Ghana U-20 ===
Addy earned his first Black Satellites call-up after an impressive performance with the Local Black Stars in 2008, making his debut in January 2008 in a match against Angola. In 2009 Addy was part of the squad that won the 2009 African Youth Championship. His success continued in October 2009 as he also took part in the 2009 FIFA U-20 World Cup held in Egypt which the team went on to win, making them the first African Nation to have ever won the 2009 FIFA U-20 World Cup.

=== Ghana ===
He was called up for the Black Stars for the game versus Lesotho on 8 June 2008. His second game was on 2 November 2008 against Niger. Addy has been called up to play for the Ghanaian Senior National Football team.

== Personal life ==
In summer 2010, Addy got engaged to German-Ghanaian Economics graduate Gabriel. The couple first met in 2008 through a mutual friend. In May 2014 Addy and his wife celebrated the birth of their first child. The couple welcomed a bouncing baby girl in their lives born in Reading, Berkshire.

== Career statistics ==
=== Club ===
As of match played on 22 April 2012.

Club	Season	Ghana Division 1		Ghanaian FA Cup		CAF Champions League		Ghana Super Cup		CAF Confederation Cup		Other^{1}		Total			
Club	Season	Apps	Goals	Apps	Goals	Apps	Goals	Apps	Goals	Apps	Goals	Apps	Goals	Apps	Goals	A yellow card	A red card
Inter Allies	2005–2006	0	0	0	0	0	0	0	0	0	0	0	0	0	0	0	0
Inter Allies	2007–2008	0	0	0	0	0	0	0	0	0	0	0	0	0	0	0	0
Total		0	0	0	0	0	0	0	0	0	0	0	0	0	0	0	0
Club	Season	Apps	Goals	Apps	Goals	Apps	Goals	Apps	Goals	Apps	Goals	Apps	Goals	Apps	Goals	A yellow card	A red card
All Stars FC	2005–2006	0	0	0	0	0	0	0	0	0	0	0	0	0	0	0	0
All Stars FC	2006–2007	0	0	0	0	0	0	0	0	0	0	0	0	0	0	0	0
Total		0	0	0	0	0	0	0	0	0	0	0	0	0	0	0	0
Club	Season	Danish Superliga		Danish Cup		UEFA Champions League		UEFA Europa League				Other^{1}		Total			
Club	Season	Apps	Goals	Apps	Goals	Apps	Goals	Apps		Goals		Apps	Goals	Apps	Goals	A yellow card	A red card
Randers FC	2008–2009	8	0	0	0	0	0	0		0		0	0	0	0	0	0
Randers FC	2009–2010	12	0	0	0	0	0	3		0		0	0	0	0	2	0
Total		20	0	0	0	0	0	3		0		0	0	23	0	2	0
Club	Season	Portuguesa Primeira Liga		Taça de Portugal		UEFA Champions League		Portuguese Super Cup		UEFA Europa League		Other^{1}		Total			
Club	Season	Apps	Goals	Apps	Goals	Apps	Goals	Apps	Goals	Apps	Goals	Apps	Goals	Apps	Goals	A yellow card	A red card
FC Porto	2009–2010	0	0	1	0	0	0	0	0	0	0	0	0	1	0	0	0
FC Porto	2010–2011	0	0	0	0	0	0	0	0	0	0	0	0	0	0	0	0
Total		0	0	1	0	0	0	0	0	0	0	0	0	1	0	0	0
Club	Season	Apps	Goals	Apps	Goals	Apps	Goals	Apps	Goals	Apps	Goals	Apps	Goals	Apps	Goals	A yellow card	A red card
Académica	2010–2011	13	2	1	0	0	0	0	0	0	0	2	0	16	2	3	3
Total		13	2	1	0	0	0	0	0	0	0	2	0	16	2	3	3
Club	Season	Greece Super League		Greek Cup		UEFA Champions League		Greek Super Cup		UEFA Europa League		Other^{1}		Total			
Club	Season	Apps	Goals	Apps	Goals	Apps	Goals	Apps	Goals	Apps	Goals	Apps	Goals	Apps	Goals	A yellow card	A red card
Panetolikos	2011–2012	25	1	2	0	0	0	0	0	0	0	0	0	27	1	8	1
Total		25	1	2	0	0	0	0	0	0	0	0	0	27	1	8	1

^{1}Includes other competitive competitions, including the Taça da Liga: 2010 and 2011.

=== International ===
As of 7 March 2013

Ghana national team
Year	Apps	Goals
2008	5	0
2009	1	0
2010	5	0
2011	4	0
2012	2	0
2013	3	0
2014	1	0
Total	21	0

== Honours ==
=== Individual ===
Ghana Premier League Young Defender of the year 2008

=== Club ===
FC Porto

Taca de Portugal Cup winners with FC Porto

Vitória Guimarães

- Portuguese Cup: 2012–13 Cup winners with Vitória S.C.

=== Country ===
- African Youth Championship Champion: 2009
- FIFA U-20 World Cup Champion: 2009
