= Universal Stars =

- Full name: Universal Stars
- Ground: Ghana
- League: Division One League Zone 1B

Universal Stars is a Ghanaian professional football team that plays in the 1B Zone of the Ghana Division One League.
