= Horribians =

- Full name: Horribians
- Ground: Ghana
- League: Division One League Zone 3A

Horribians is a Ghanaian professional football team that plays in the 3A Zone of the Ghana Division One League. Zone 3A has seven competing teams from the part of the Greater Accra Region and the Volta Region of Ghana.
