= Prosper Avor =

Ghanaian professional footballer

Personal information
- Date of birth: 12 December 1992 (age 33)
- Place of birth: Kpandu, Ghana
- Height: 1.78 m (5 ft 10 in)
- Positions: Centre-back; defensive midfielder

Team information
- Current team: Liberty Professionals
- Number: 24

Youth career
- 2008–2009: Super Rangers FC

Senior career*
Years	Team	Apps	(Gls)
2009–2014	Heart of Lions	150	(23)
2015–2016	Okyeman Planners F.C.	30	(2)
2016–	Liberty Professionals	30	(3)

International career
2012	Ghana U20	1	(0)
- * Club domestic league appearances and goals

Prosper Avor is a Ghanaian professional footballer. He plays for Liberty Professionals in the Ghana Premier League. He formerly played at Hearts of Lion. He plays as a centre back or defensive midfielder.

== Career ==
The centre-back started his career in 2006 with Ghanaian divisional side Super Rangers FC. He played one year for the team Super Rangers FC, before moved in the spring 2009 to Ghana Premier League club Heart of Lions. After 5 1/2 years at Lions, was on 30 January 2015 signed by Ghana Division One League club Okyeman Planners F.C.

At the end of the 2016 season, a host of clubs including Accra Hearts of Oak and Liberty Professionals had chased for his signature but it was Liberty Professionals that got him.

He went on trails at South African club Witbank Spurs F.C. in November 2017 but the deal fell out due financial agreement.

=== Heart of Lions ===
In the MTN FA Cup 2013, he scored the open goal in the 34th minutes, helping his side to a 2–0 win over Mighty Jets, on 6 April at Kpandu.

=== Liberty Professionals ===
He has already scored 3 goals for the Liberty Professionals in the Ghana Premier League 2016–17.

== Personal Achievement ==
- 2016-2017, Ghana Premier League, First Round winner of the Most Valuable Player Award.
