= Philip Awuku =

Ghanaian footballer

Personal information
- Full name: Philip Gameli Awuku
- Date of birth: 27 April 2000 (age 26)
- Place of birth: Accra, Ghana
- Height: 1.90 m (6 ft 3 in)
- Position: Centre-back

Senior career*
Years	Team	Apps	(Gls)
2020–2021	Planners Athletic Club		(0)
2021–2023	Yeni Malatyaspor	31	(0)
2023	→ Tuzlaspor (loan)	11	(1)
2023–2024	Tuzlaspor	24	(0)
2024	Manisa FK	11	(0)
2025	Şanlıurfaspor	11	(0)
2025–2026	Al-Ittihad Misurata	0	(0)
- * Club domestic league appearances and goals as of 19 March 2026

Philip Gameli Awuku (born 27 April 2000) is a professional footballer who plays as a centre-back. Born in Ghana, he represents Togo internationally.

== Club career ==
Awuku began his career with the Ghanaian club Planners Athletic Club, and transferred to the Turkish club Yeni Malatyaspor on 1 February 2021. He made his professional debut with Yeni Malatyaspor in a 5–1 Süper Lig loss to Trabzonspor on 16 August 2021.

== International career ==
Awuku was called up to the Togo national football team in September 2023.
