= Bazooka F.C. =

- Full name: Bazooka F.C.
- Ground: Ghana
- League: Division One League Zone 1A

Bazooka F.C. is a Ghanaian professional football team that plays in the 1A Zone of the Ghana Division One League. Zone 1A has seven competing teams from the part of the Ashanti Region, Brong Ahafo Region and the three Northern Regions of Ghana.
