= Adansi United FC =

Ghanaian football club

- Full name: Adansi United Football Club
- Short name: Adansi FC
- Founded: 1990
- Owner: Enoch Atakorah
- League: Division Two League
Home colours

Adansi United Football Club is also known Adansi Utd FC is a Ghanaian professional association football club based in Kumasi, Ashanti Region, Ghana. They are currently competing in Division Two League of the Ghanaian league system. As a Second Division club, they are also entitled to play in the Ghanaian FA Cup.

== History ==
The team was founded in 1990 by George Amoako a former Ghanaian professional player.

== Club badge and colours ==
Adansi United Football Club home colors are Yellow and Green. Traditional away kit for Adansi FC is Yellow and home Green.
