= Kim Grant (footballer) =

Ghanaian footballer

Personal information
- Full name: Kim Tyrone Grant
- Date of birth: 25 September 1972 (age 54)
- Place of birth: Sekondi-Takoradi, Ghana
- Height: 5 ft 10 in (1.78 m)
- Position: Striker

Team information
- Current team: Prague Raptors (director of football & Head Coach)

Youth career
- ?–1991: Charlton Athletic

Senior career*
Years	Team	Apps	(Gls)
1991–1996	Charlton Athletic	123	(18)
1996–1997	Luton Town	34	(5)
1997	→ Millwall (loan)	3	(3)
1997–1999	Millwall	52	(8)
1998–1999	→ Notts County (loan)	6	(1)
1999–2000	KFC Lommel	19	(3)
2000–2001	F.C. Marco	2	(0)
2001	Scunthorpe United	4	(1)
2001–2003	Yeovil Town	33	(6)
2003–2004	Imortal Albufeira	12	(6)
2004	Sarawak FA	7	(3)
2005	Shonan Bellmare	0	(0)
2005	Gravesend & Northfleet	7	(1)
2006	AFC Wimbledon	4	(0)
2006	Sengkang Punggol FC	19	(10)
2007	Geylang United FC	8	(3)
2008	Woking	0	(0)
Total		333	(68)

International career
1996–1997	Ghana	7	(1)

Managerial career
- 2008: Woking
- 2009: Takoradi Football Club
- 2014: KG-IFA
- 2016: Cape-Coast Ebusua Dwarfs FC
- 2017: Saif Sporting Club
- 2017–2018: Elmina Sharks Football Club
- 2018–2019: Accra Hearts of Oak S.C.
- 2019–: Prague Raptors
- * Club domestic league appearances and goals

Kim Tyrone Grant (born 25 September 1972) is a former professional footballer with a distinguished career spanning more than 24 years, during which he played in both European, Africa and Asian football leagues. Currently, Grant holds the dual roles of Director of Football and Head Coach for Prague Raptors Football Club. He is a former Ghana international football player who transitioned to professional coaching, where he has held significant positions as a Technical and Director of Football. Grant also possesses the English FA Level UEFA A coaching license, highlighting his expertise and qualifications in the field of football coaching.

== Club career ==
Born in Sekondi-Takoradi, Grant started his career at Charlton Athletic in their youth system and he signed his first professional contract in March 1991. He went on to make 155 appearances spanning over nine years and scoring 25 goals. He later made appearances for Charlton against Manchester United and Liverpool in the FA Cup and scored a 20-yard curler to beat David James in a 2–1 defeat to in 1996.

In March 1996, Luton Town paid £250,000 to bring him to Kenilworth Road. He spent one and a half years at Luton, making 43 appearances and scoring eight goals. Following a loan spell in which he scored four goals in five appearances, Grant moved to Millwall for £185,000 in September 1997 and went on to make 57 appearances, scoring nine goals. He was on loan at Notts County from December 1998 to February 1999, where he made six appearances and scored one goal.

Grant left Millwall in 1999 to play in the Belgium Premier League with KFC Lommel, commanding a transfer fee of £65,000. After one season with Lommel, during which he scored three goals in 19 league appearances, he left and played in the Portuguese second division for F.C. Marco in the 2000–01 season, making two league appearances.

Grant returned to England in August 2001 after signing for Scunthorpe United, making five appearances and scoring one goal, before signing with Yeovil Town in October. In his first year, Yeovil won the FA Trophy cup and finished second in the Football Conference. In his second year, Yeovil has crowned champions of the Football Conference, winning promotion to the Football League.

Having made 39 appearances and scored eight goals for Yeovil Grant returned to Portugal in 2003 to sign for Imortal Albufeira where he played for the 2003–04 season, making 12 league appearances and scoring six goals. Grant later played in the Malaysian Superleague for Sarawak FA, scoring three goals in eight league appearances in 2004. A spell with Japanese 2nd division side Shonan Bellmare followed, failing to make any appearances in 2005.

He returned to England with Gravesend & Northfleet in August 2005. After making seven appearances and scoring one goal for Gravesend Grant had a four-game spell with AFC Wimbledon after signing in February 2006. He signed for Sengkang Punggol FC of the S.League in 2006, where he scored 10 goals in 19 league appearances. He signed for Geylang United FC in 2007, making seven league appearances and scoring three goals. He was released for a serious disciplinary breach after swearing.

== International career ==
From 1996 to 1997, Grant was capped seven times and scored once for his country of birth Ghana.

== Coaching and managerial career ==
Grant was appointed as manager of Conference National side Woking in May 2008. However, after seven games, from which Woking picked up two points, he was sacked on 3 September. He returned to Ghana in the summer of 2009 to become the owner and head coach of the newly founded club F.C. Takoradi. In January 2014, Grant established and founded Kim Grant International Football Academy KG-IFA. In May 2014, Kim Grant was appointed the technical director of Cape-Coast Ebusua Dwarfs FC. Having arrived at the club languishing in the last position in the Ghana premier league, Grant was able to turn the fortunes of the club to finish 9th in the league saving them from relegation. In April 2017, he was appointed head coach of Saif Sporting Club Limited. The newly formed professional club based in Dhaka, Bangladesh, is looking to be a force in the Bangladesh football with hopes of winning the Bangladesh premier league title with a view to qualifying for the AFC Cup Saif Sporting Club.

In December 2017, Kim Grant was appointed the technical director of Elmina Sharks Football Club, Sea Lions F.C. (ladies), Elmina Football Academy (youth). After leaving his position as Head Coach of Saif Sporting Club at the end of the first round of the Bangladesh premier league, Grant was approached and appointed Technical Director by Ghana premier league side Elmina Sharks Football Club to help aid the club's development and with its ambitions of finishing in the top four for the upcoming 2018 Ghana Premier league season. After resigning from his position as Technical director of Elmina Sharks Football Club in October 2018, Kim Grant was appointed Director of Football and Head Coach of Ghana premier league giants Accra Hearts of Oak. Grant penned a three-year contract.

Kim Grant was appointed Director of Football and Head Coach of Ghana premier league giants Accra Hearts of Oak S.C. Hearts has penned Kim Grant on a three-year contract with hopes of winning the Ghana premier league title and to qualify for the CAF Champions League. Kim Grant was unveiled at the press conference on 8 November and will officially begin his contract on 1 December 2018. Accra Hearts of Oak S.C. Kim Grant's contract with Accra Hearts of Oak SC was terminated on 31 December 2019, reasons for which the Board of the team did not give details.

Kim Grant was appointed Director of Football and Head Coach of Ghana premier league giants Accra Hearts of Oak S.C. Hearts has penned Kim Grant on a three-year contract with hopes of winning the Ghana premier league title and to qualify for the CAF Champions League. Kim Grant was unveiled at the press conference on 8 November and will officially begin his contract on 1 December 2018. Accra Hearts of Oak S.C. Kim Grant's contract with Accra Hearts of Oak SC was terminated on 31 December 2019, reasons for which the Board of the team did not give details.

Kim Grant assumed the role of Director of Football at Prague Raptors Football Club in the Czech Republic, following his departure from Accra Hearts of Oak. Appointed by the club president, Mr. Daz Moss, Grant was entrusted with overseeing the club's football project, implementing both short and long-term strategies and philosophies. His appointment, officially announced in January 2020, marked a significant milestone for the club, and he quickly became an integral part of the Raptors FC Coaching Team, as reported by Prague Raptors Football Club's official website. During Grant's tenure, Prague Raptors Football Club experienced unprecedented success. Under his stewardship, the team gained promotion three times in just four years and reached the finals of the European Fenix Trophy for two consecutive years, in 2022 and 2023. Despite their previous losses in the finals against FC United of Manchester from England in 2022 and BK Skjold from Copenhagen, Denmark in 2023, the Raptors were gearing up for their third attempt in 2024, aiming to secure the coveted title. Grant's strategic vision and exceptional leadership played a pivotal role in the club's rapid success and its ambitions on the European stage. In addition to his achievements at the senior level, Grant took on diverse roles within the club. He currently serves as the Director of Football and Head Coach for both the A and B teams of men, showcasing his versatility and expertise in managing various aspects of the club's football operations. Grant's impact extended beyond the men's teams; he played a pivotal role in the women's team's historic promotion to the Czech 2nd division for the first time in their history. He supported his coaching staff as the director of football, aiding them in this significant achievement. Furthermore, Grant actively supported and aided the establishment of the Prague Raptors Youth Academy, which has now developed into a thriving institution boasting age-specific teams, including U7, U9, U11, U13, and U15 categories. Grant's dedication to developing football at both the senior and youth levels has solidified his reputation as a transformative figure within Prague Raptors Football Club and the broader Czech football community. Prague Raptors Expat Next Door: Kim From Ghana

== See also ==
- Paa Grant Soccer Academy
