= Paul Addo =

Ghanaian footballer (born 1990)

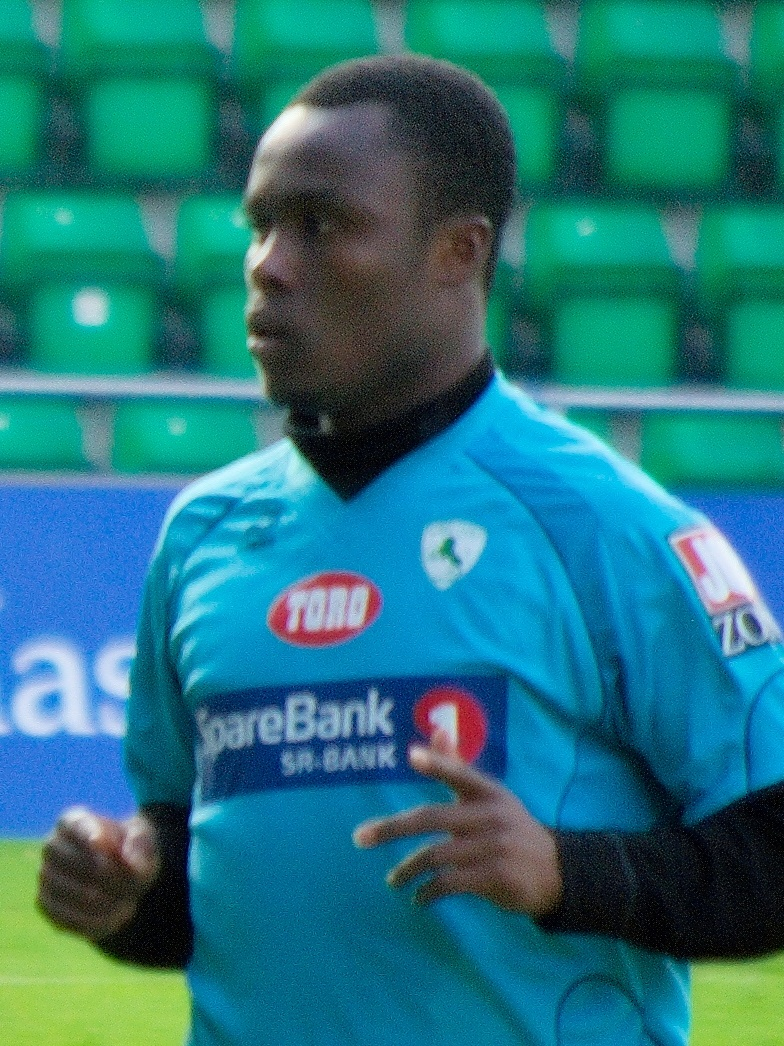
- Paul Addo in a match against Sogndal

Personal information
- Full name: Paul Yaw Addo
- Date of birth: 14 June 1990 (age 36)
- Place of birth: Accra, Ghana
- Height: 1.74 m (5 ft 9 in)
- Position: Left back

Youth career
- Adelaide Fair Point

Senior career*
Years	Team	Apps	(Gls)
2006–2007	Fair Point		
2008	Bechem Chelsea		
2009–2012	Løv-Ham	52	(0)
2011	→ Odd Grenland (loan)	21	(1)
2012–2013	Odd	11	(0)
2013	→ Strømmen (loan)	28	(0)
2014–2018	Bryne	63	(0)

International career
2007	Ghana U-17	5	(0)
- * Club domestic league appearances and goals as of 28 January 2019

Paul Yaw Addo (born 14 June 1990) is a Ghanaian footballer who most recently played as a defender for Norwegian side Bryne.

== Career ==
Addo was born in Accra and began his career with Fair Point and signed on 11 June 2008 for Bechem Chelsea. He joined in February 2009 for a trial to the Norwegian club Løv-Ham and signed a contract.

Addo played his debut for Løv-Ham on 5 April 2009 against Moss. He trained with Brann and played a testimonial match for the club on 21 November 2009.

Addo joined Odd Grenland on loan in 2011, before he joined the club on a permanent contract the next year. Addo was a regular in Odd's defence until Emil Jonassen became the preferred left back. In the 2013 season he joined Strømmen on loan. After the season, he transferred to Bryne. He left Bryne again at the end of the 2018 season.

== International career ==
He represented the Ghana U-17 in 2007 FIFA U-17 World Cup in Korea Republic as captain.

== Career statistics ==
Season	Club	Division	League		Cup		Total	
Season	Club	Division	Apps	Goals	Apps	Goals	Apps	Goals
2009	Løv-Ham	Adeccoligaen	27	0	2	0	29	0
2010	Løv-Ham	Adeccoligaen	25	0	4	0	29	0
2011	Odd	Tippeligaen	21	1	4	0	25	1
2012	Odd	Tippeligaen	11	0	1	0	12	0
2013	Odd	Tippeligaen	0	0	0	0	0	0
2013	Strømmen	Adeccoligaen	28	0	2	0	30	0
2014	Bryne	1. divisjon	17	0	2	0	19	0
2015	Bryne	OBOS-ligaen	27	0	2	0	29	0
2016	Bryne	OBOS-ligaen	5	0	1	0	6	0
Career Total			161	1	18	0	179	1
