= Deportivo F.C. =

Deportivo FC
- Full name: Deportivo FC
- Ground: Ghana
- League: Division One League Zone 2A

Deportivo FC is a Ghanaian professional football team that plays in the 2A Zone of the Ghana Division One League. Zone 2A has seven competing teams from the part of the Ashanti Region, Western Region and the Central Region of Ghana.
