= Bolgatanga Manchester City F.C. =

- Full name: Bolgatanga Manchester City F.C.
- Nickname: Bolga Man City
- Founded: 1993
- Chairman: Abdul Razak
- League: Division Two
- 2012–13: 2nd
Home colours	Away colours

Bolgatanga Manchester City F.C. (commonly known as Bolga Man City) is a Ghanaian football club based in Bolgatanga, currently competing in Division Two of the Ghanaian league system. As a Second Division club, they are also entitled to enter the Ghanaian FA Cup.

Named after English Premier League side Manchester City, they play in an all-blue home kit with white trim, though no official links exist between the two clubs.

== History ==
Bolga Man City were founded on 1 February 1993 by Abukari Fusein.
