= Keta Sandlanders F.C. =

Ghanaian football club

Keta Sandlanders Football Club
- Nickname: Sandlanders
- Founded: 2002
- Ground: Keta Park
- Capacity: 3,000
- Chairman: Frank Selasie Cole
- Manager: Desmond Apeku
- League: GAFCOA
| Home colours | Away colours |

The Keta Sandlanders are a Ghanaian association football club and co-operative founded in 2002 and based in Keta, Ghana. They are competing in the GAFCOA.
