= Accra Inter Allies =

- Full name: Accra Inter Allies
- Ground: Ghana
- League: Division One League Zone 3A
Home colours	Away colours

Accra Inter Allies is a Ghanaian professional football team that plays in the 3A Zone of the Ghana Division One League. Zone 3A has seven competing teams from the part of the Greater Accra Region and the Volta Region of Ghana.

== Management ==
Accra Inter Allies and its Soccer Academy is owned and managed by Directors namely Rabeh EL-Eter, and Delali Eric Senaye. These are some of the positions in the club:

=== Positions ===
- . Rabeh EL-Eter – President
- . Delali Eric Senaye – CEO/Vice President
- . William Klutse – Technical Director
