= Akim Oda Sunderland Football Academy =

Oda Sunderland
- Full name: Akim Oda Sunderland Football Academy
- Nickname(s): T
- Founded: July 2010
- Ground: Oda Sports Stadium (gh)
- Capacity: 5,000
- League: GAFCOA
Home colours	Away colours

Akim Oda Sunderland Football Academy is a Ghanaian association football club and academy based in Akim Oda, Ghana. They are competing in the GAFCOA.

== Satellite clubs ==
- Asante Kotoko
- Sunderland F.C.
