= Techiman North District =

- District
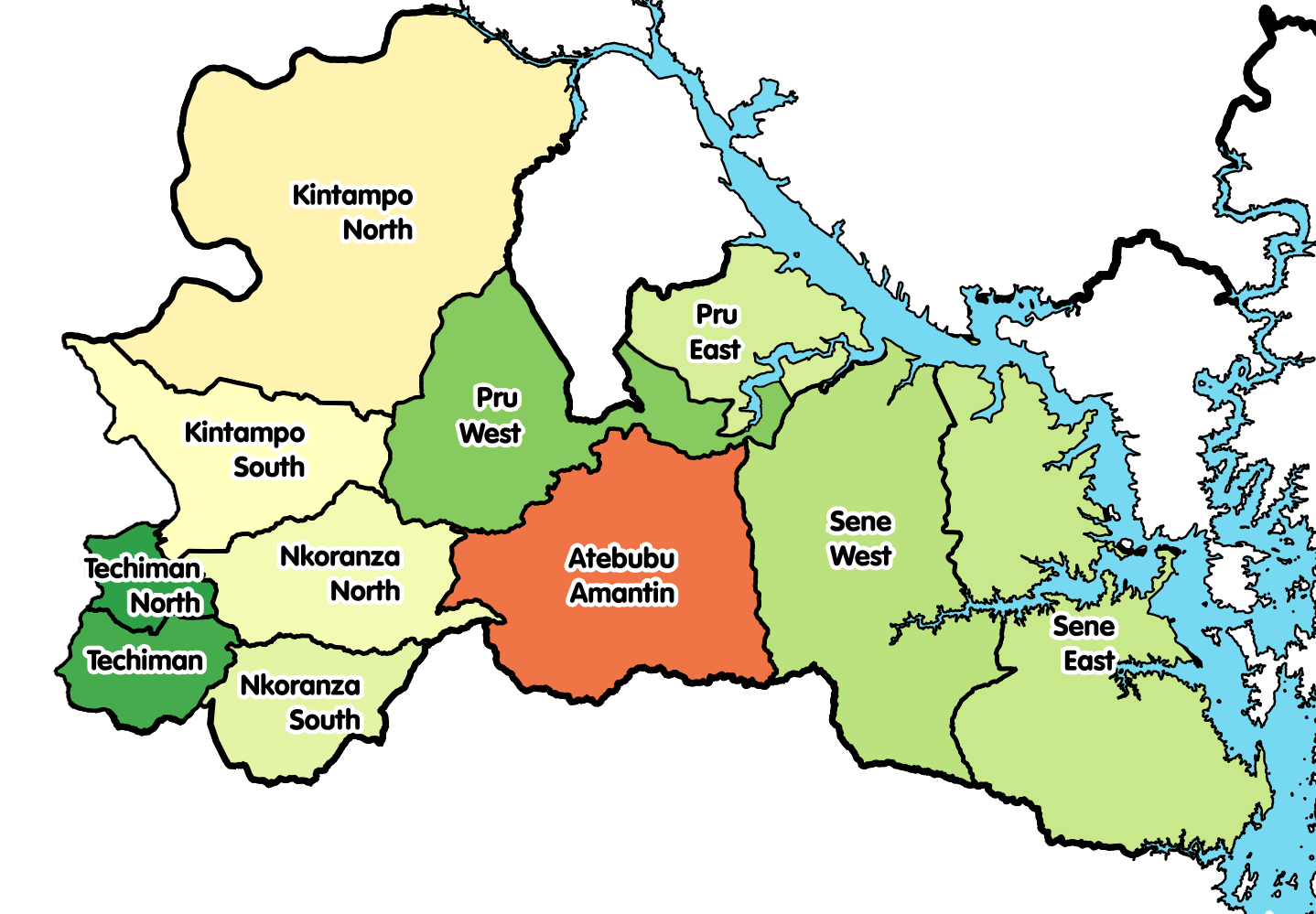
- Districts of Bono East Region

- Location of Techiman North District within Bono East Region
- Coordinates: 7°38′N 1°54′W
- Country: Ghana
- Region: Bono East
- Capital: Tuobodom

Population (2021)
  - Total: 102,529
- Time zone: UTC+0 (GMT)

Techiman North District is one of the eleven districts in Bono East Region, Ghana. Originally it was formerly part of the then-larger Techiman District on 10 March 1989; until the northern part of the district was split off to create Techiman North District on 28 June 2012; thus the remaining part has been retained as Techiman District (which it was later upgraded to municipal district assembly status and has been renamed as Techiman Municipal District on that same year). The district assembly is located in the western part of Bono East Region and Tuobodom as its capital town.
