= Tema City FC =

Football club in Ghana

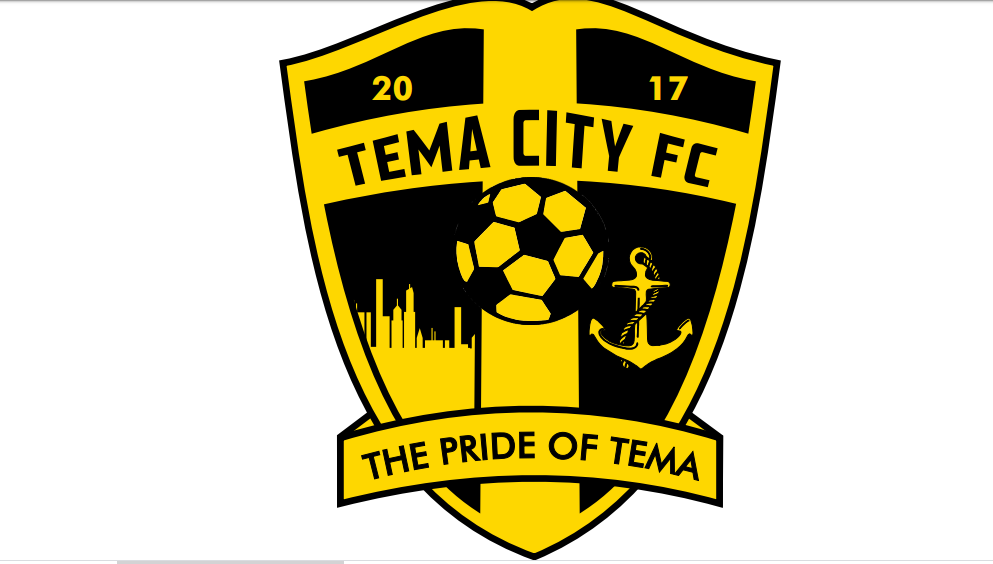
- Full name: Tema City FC
- Nickname(s): Temarians
- Founded: July 2017
- Ground: Tema Sports Stadium; Tema, Greater Accra region, Ghana
- Capacity: 5,000
- Owner: Eric Jerry Aidoo
- Manager: (Ghana) Kwame Obeng
- League: Division Two League
- Website: http://www.temacityfc.com/

Tema City FC, commonly referred to as Tema City, is a Ghanaian football club based in Tema, Greater Accra. They compete in the Division Two League in Ghana.

== History ==
The club was founded in July 2017 by businessman and politician Hon. Eric Jerry Aidoo who is the Greater Accra Regional Youth Organiser of the Convention People's Party. In April 2019 the club won its first trophy by lifting the 2019 Palace Trophy after beating Future Heroes FC 3 - 0 at the Complex Sports Arena in Tema on Saturday. The club has also won the Bobo Djaló Tournament Cup and the Next Africa Big Talent. Tema City play their home games at the Tema Park.

== Current squad ==
Note: Flags indicate national team as defined under FIFA eligibility rules; some limited exceptions apply. Players may hold more than one non-FIFA nationality.

No.	Pos.	Nation	Player
21	GK	(Ghana) GHA	Philip Folivi
2	DF	(Ghana) GHA	David Darko
3	DF	(Ghana) GHA	Kelvin Boateng Yeboah
4	MF	(Ghana) GHA	Benjamin Mireku
5	MF	(Ghana) GHA	Assogba Kofi Peter
6	MF	(Ghana) GHA	Faisal Saaka
7	MF	(Ghana) GHA	Salim Uzair Baafada
14	MF	(Ghana) GHA	Harrison Kwame Danso
10	FW	(Ghana) GHA	Richmond Nsoh Aduko
1	GK	(Ghana) GHA	Paul Tanity
13	FW	(Ghana) GHA	Bismarck Owusu
15	FW	(Ghana) GHA	Christopher Kabu
17	DF	(Ghana) GHA	Kwame Ansah Boafo

No.	Pos.	Nation	Player
11	FW	(Ghana) GHA	Joshua Kwabena Gameli
12	FW	(Ghana) GHA	Kwesi Ankomah
40	FW	(Mali) MLI	Mamadou M Diallo
35	DF	(Ghana) GHA	Emmanuel K Arthur
33	DF	(Ghana) GHA	Solomon Njabila
32	DF	(Ghana) GHA	Bright Mensah
30	FW	(Ghana) GHA	Emmanuel Nubour
16	FW	(Ghana) GHA	Sherif Darling

== Players and transfer ==
In May 2019 Tema City FC midfielder Benjamin Mireku was rated among the Top 10 Ghanaian U20 footballing prospects you must know. In August 2019 Ghanaian media reports linked defender Kelvin Boateng Yeboah to a move to Portuguese side Rio Ave. In February 2019 the club announced the signing of Malian player Mamadou Diallo. Trio Salim Uzair Baafada, Kwesi Ankomah, and goalkeeper Philip Folivi have been linked with moves to Ghana Premier League side AshantiGold S.C. in the past.

== Honours ==
- Palace Trophy - 2019
- Bobo Djaló Tournament Cup -2018
- Next Africa Big Talent - 2020
