= Magic Stars Football Club =

Nigerian professional football club

Magic Stars Football Club is a Nigerian professional football club based in Lagos. The club was founded in November 2021 and competes in the Nigeria Nationwide League One (NLO), the third tier of Nigerian football. Since its establishment, the club has participated in youth development initiatives, international competitions, and domestic league campaigns.

== History ==
Magic Stars FC was officially registered with the Nigeria Football Federation through the Lagos State Football Association in 2021. The club was founded by Kayode Akanji Agboola, who also serves as its chairman.

In October 2022, Agboola joined other Nigeria Nationwide League (NLO) club chairmen on an eight-day football business tour of the United Kingdom organized through the NVA Sports & Entertainment Group. The tour focused on football business development and potential partnerships with European clubs.

In March 2024, the club organized the Magic Scouting Tournament at Legacy Pitch, National Stadium Surulere, featuring eight teams. The tournament was coordinated by former Nigerian footballer and Italian-based manager Mathew Olorunleke.

Magic Stars secured promotion to the Nigeria Nationwide League One (NLO) in 2024 after defeating Ojodu City on penalties during the NLO playoffs in Ibadan. Between 2024 and 2025, the team recorded an unbeaten run of 18 Nigeria Nationwide League matches, achieving 15 wins and 3 draws.

== League Participation and Achievements ==
=== Nigeria Nationwide League One (NLO) ===
Magic Stars compete in the NLO. Notable achievements include:

- Nationwide League One Promotion (2024): Achieved after a playoff victory against Ojodu City in Ibadan.

=== Viareggio Cup (2025) ===
In March 2025, Magic Stars participated in the 75th Viareggio Cup in Italy. They were drawn in Group C:

- vs. Casarano U19 – 2–1 win
- vs. APIA Leichhardt U19 – 4–0 win
- vs. Sassuolo U19 – 3–0 win

They defeated Vis Pesaro 5–0 in the Round of 16 before losing to Genoa U19 in the quarter-finals.

== Management and Technical Staff ==
- Chairman / President: Kayode Akanji Agboola
- Director of Football: Isaac Iseoluwa Oluwatobi
- Technical Consultant: Mathew Olorunleke
- Head Coach: Bisoye Henshaw

== Community Engagement and Development ==
Magic Stars FC engages in youth development through scouting tournaments and collaborations with grassroots football programs in Lagos. The club plans to establish a residential academy to support player development and create pathways for Nigerian talents to join domestic and international clubs.
