= Kurt Okraku =

Ghanaian football journalist and administrator

Kurt E. S. Okraku
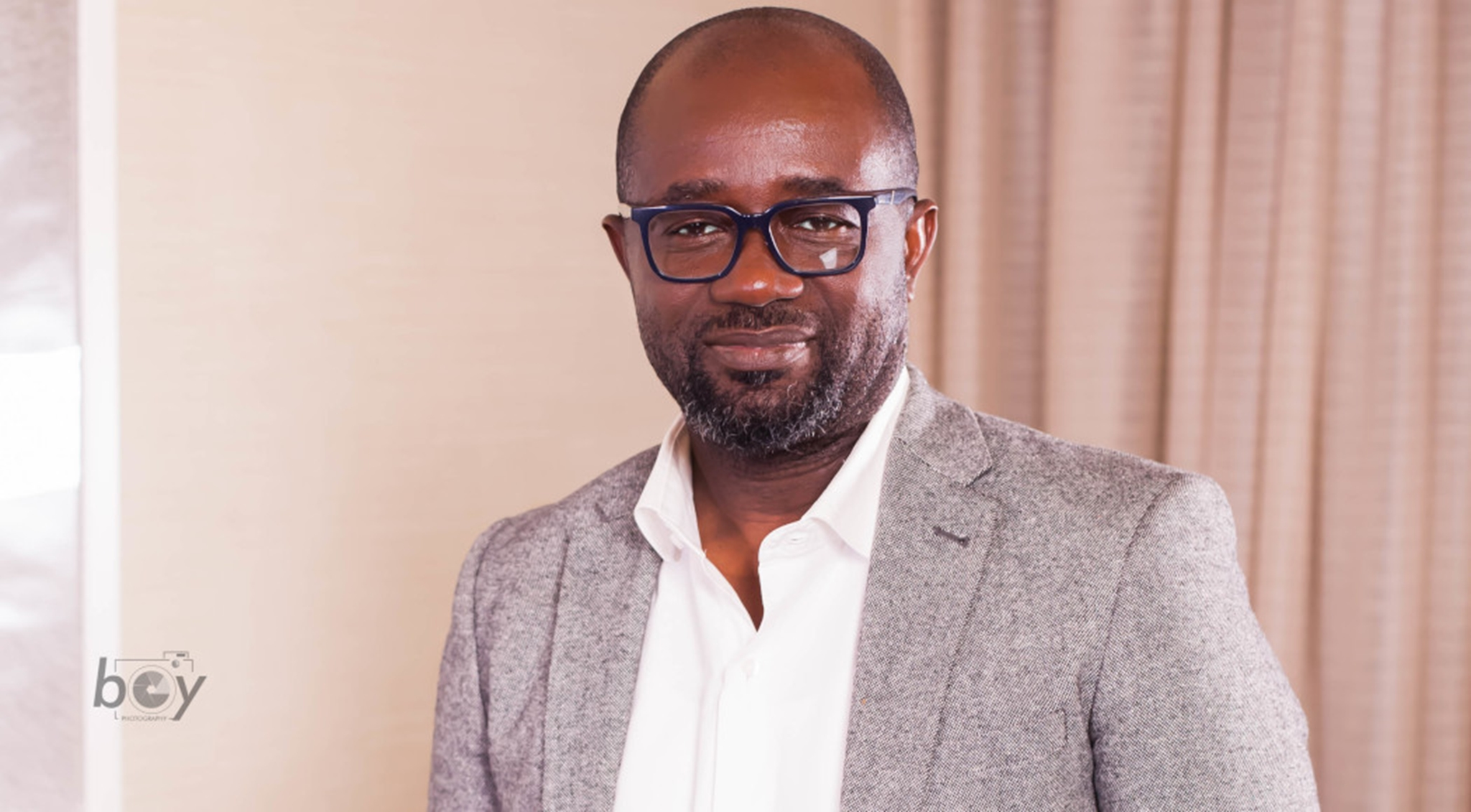

President of the Ghana Football Association
- Incumbent
- Assumed office 2019
- Preceded by: Kwesi Nyantakyi

Personal details
- Born: Kurt Edwin Simeon-Okraku; 1971 (age 54–55) Ghana
- Education: Ghana Senior High School, Koforidua; University of Ghana (BA); University of Liverpool (MBA)
- Occupation: Football administrator

Kurt Edwin Simon Okraku (born June 1, 1971) is a Ghanaian football administrator who has served as the President of the Ghana Football Association since October 2019. He is a former sports journalist and past Executive chairman of Dreams. He also served on various executive committees of the Ghana Football Association as well as the national team, the Ghana Black Stars.

== Early life and education ==
After completing his secondary education at Ghana Senior High School, Koforidua, Okraku began his official association with football in early 1996 when he formed the colts club. He received his bachelor's degree from the University of Ghana. He trained as a journalist at the Ghana Institute of Journalism. He received his MBA from the University of Liverpool. While in the UK, he also received instruction in marketing, hospitality, and tourism management.

== Career ==
He established a colt football club, Shooting Stars FC when he was 17 years old and was also the Director of the Jawara Babies Colt Club. From 1996 to 1999, he was a presenter and sports presenter for Radio Univers 105.7 FM, campus radio of the University of Ghana, Legon and concurrently served as the public relations officer for Afienya United FC, Tema and at the Public Relations Department, Ministry of Youth and Sports (1997–98) and the sports editor for Groove FM (1998–99). Between 1999 and 2000, he was the Deputy Sports Editor, Network Broadcasting Ltd, owners of Radio Gold. He was the Communications and Marketing Director of Accra Hearts of Oak S.C. between 2006 and 2007.

He worked for sports marketing companies in the UK and Israel. He was the Communications and marketing director of Accra Hearts of Oak between 2006 and 2007. He was the administrative manager of Ghana League Clubs Association (GHALCA) from 2008 to 2010. He became general manager of Wassaman in 2011. He is the chairman of the board of Dream FC.

=== Ghana Football Association ===
Okraku on 29 October 2019 became the president of the Ghana Football Association. He became the first president of the Ghana Football Association after the Anas ''exposay," which led the Federation of International Football Association (FIFA), with the president of the Republic of Ghana dissolving the Ghana FA in 2017. Upon his election as the new GFA president, the FIFA President, Gianni Infantino sent a congratulatory message to him and members of the new Executive Council of the GFA. Kurt E.S Okraku chaired the Ghana Football Association FA Cup committee. Speaking on the numbers of players who leave the Ghanaian Leagues to join foreign leagues, he mentioned that there will be a need for investment in local leagues to help curb the situation.

The GFA announced the exclusive list for its presidential election on Monday August 4, 2023, confirming that the incumbent, Kurt Okraku, and the former GFA vice president, George Afriyie, have successfully submitted their forms for the eminent role. On Thursday, October 5, 2023, Simon Okraku was re-elected as the president of the Ghana Football Association at the Global Dream Hotel, Tamale.

In October 2024, he delivered a speech to the players of Black Stars which was condemned on the internet after it was posted online.
