= Uncle 'T' FC =

- Ground: Prampram, Ghana
- Owner: Isaac Tetteh
- League: Division One League Zone 3B

Uncle 'T' FC, also known as Uncle 'T' United, formerly called Pure Joy Stars, is a Ghanaian professional football team based in Prampram, that plays in the 3B Zone of the Ghana Division One League. Zone 3B has seven competing teams from the part of the Greater Accra Region and the Volta Region of Ghana.

The name of the club was changed from Pure Joy Stars to Uncle 'T' FC in 2016, when it was bought by Isaac Tetteh. The club is listed as Uncle 'T' FC on the Ghana Football Association website, but the badge displays the name Uncle 'T' United.

Robert Addo Sowah played and served as Captain for Uncle T before moving to Accra Hearts of Oak in 2016.
