= S.C. Adelaide =

Ghanaian football club

- Full name: Sportiva Calcio Adelaide
- Nicknames: Azzurri; Bashers
- Founded: 1995; 31 years ago
- Ground: Christ Church Stadium; Ningo Pampram, Greater Accra, Ghana
- Capacity: 10,000
- Manager: Johannes Van der Heyden
- League: Division Three League
Home colours	Away colours	Third colours

Sportiva Calcio Adelaide commonly referred to as Adelaide or the abbreviation S.C. Adelaide, is a Ghanaian professional football club based in Tema, Greater Accra, who are competing in the Ghana Division Three League. The club has spent most of their history as a youth football team, but recently converted into a senior team in second tier of the Ghana Football Leagues. Adelaide was initially started as a football club, as a club oriented to multiple sports. Adelaide has departments for athletics, basketball, football, handball, swimming, volleyball, and others. Their motto is Deo Juvante (Latin) meaning with God's Help.

== History ==
The club was founded as a sporting club in 1995 as an organization to aid the youth in the community to get into sports. It was named after St Adelaide of Italy (thus the Italian connection Sportiva Calcio Adelaide). Adelaide means Noble kind; of the noble sort, and this was what the organization set out to do to the community. "The opening of the club is with an aim to developing talents and to raise up a generation who will be brave enough to face the world practically and make the nation and the continent as a whole proud." In honor of its origins, the club has retained the Italian name as Sportiva Calcio Adelaide, instead of changing it to the Adelaide Sporting Club, the S.C. is in front of the Adelaide and not after, which is sometimes confused since more sporting activities are being taken.

== Colours and Badge ==
Throughout the entire history of the club, they have been represented by the colour blue and white. The colours have two representations, firstly psychics who claim to be able to observe the aura with their third eye report that someone with a blue aura is a person who is oriented toward spirituality. People with blue auras are said to be interested in social service work and to be in occupations such as social worker, counsellor, teacher, writer, and psychologist. due to the aim of the organization. Secondly with its Italian connection, Azzurro (meaning sky), a light blue, is the national colour of Italy as such Adelaide's blue jersey, they have gained the nickname Azzurri. White was chosen because White was the symbol of Catholics, white means purity. Blue jerseys are used for home matches and white jerseys for away matches. The team also wears a third jersey aqua (cyan colour) for matches on neutral grounds, when the opposition wears white or on holiday games. The bashers (bashing is a term meaning thumping) another nickname came from the team's thumping of their opposition. The nickname also comes from the municipality Tema which used to be a land of calabashes (Tema originated from ' Tor-man ' in Ga meaning calabash-town).

== Stadium ==
The team's current home grounds is a 10,000 capacity park – Christ Church, in the district of Ningo Prampram where it's located. There is ambiguity with the origin of the name, it was named after the many catholic cathedrals, it is also believed the name was given as a place for rejoicing for the fans where they will go and enjoy themselves from the football.

== Approach and Philosophy ==
S.C. Adelaide has been described as a team which has a desire to entertain and attack, their style of play has been likened to Arsenal F.C. style of playing, quick one two passes, through passes and the odd one or two long passes. Others interpret their style as Total football due to their Dutch coach nicknamed the "Dutchmaster". "If you are looking to watch total football by the Netherlands national football team or looking to watch Arsenal F.C. live and not on TV look no further, just watch S.C. Adelaide, how do they do it" – Kalusha, sports presenter on Peace FM Ghana . The club focuses on and is dedicated to developing individual and collective technical ability, ball control, possession, passing and defending.

At the youth level, S.C. Adelaide's talent recruitment is aided by chief scout Seth Hoffmann, who also serves as the under–12 and under–17 southern sector scout for the Ghana Football Association. This positioning frequently allows the club to secure young prospects before they are scouted by other teams.

Several players from the academy have achieved notable recognition. Striker Ransford Osei was described by FIFA.com as an "opportunistic goal machine" with strong pace and movement, and was included in World Soccer Magazine’s November 2007 list of the "50 Most Exciting Teenagers on the Planet". Fullback Daniel Opare was also featured in the same World Soccer Magazine issue following his performances for Ghana's U-17 team, the Black Starlets, at the 2007 U-17 World Cup. Additionally, David Addy was named the 2008 Young Player of the Year in Ghana.

Following the 2006–07 youth season, the entire first-team squad was transferred to prominent Ghana Premier League clubs, including Hearts of Oak and Kotoko. To protect their players from unapproved scouting, the club installed boarded palisade fencing around their training grounds.

== Statistics and records ==
Adelaide is one of the most successful youth clubs in Ghana, having produced the most number of European-based players by any youth team in Ghana. A record of 6 players; highest ever representation of a single club for the Under-17 team played in 1999. A total of 17 players have been produced for the under-17 since the club's inception. Most of the players were recruited by premier league clubs into their youth teams and first teams. Eric Bekoe is the club's top goalscorer with 106 goals in all competitions between 2001 and 2004 for the under – 17's followed by Ransford Osei's total of 79 between 2000 and 2002 for the under – 12's. Jimmy Addo is the youngest player to ever play against a senior team at 14 years 2 months. Adelaide holds the record for the most goals in a single season, this includes youth league, national youth cup and colts cup competition, with a total of 124 goals in the 2001–02 season. In the 2001–02 season, Eric Bekoe scored 42 goals in 34 appearances, setting the Ghanaian record in a single season. The most goals scored by a player in a single match is 7 by Saddick Adams, which is also a Ghanaian record, the highest number of goals in a single match was 14 both records in a home match against Hamilton Youth F.C. in the 2003–04 season. They played a total of 32 passes and had possession for about 5 minutes. The Adelaide defense set a new record after going 22 consecutive games without conceding a goal and went unbeaten the whole of the 2007/08 season. A commentator said "they (Adelaide) are protecting their goal like they will all die if the ball hit the post let alone if they conceded a goal".

- Youth League: 5

1998–99, 2001–02, 2003–04, 2006–07, 2007–08

- Regional Youth Cup: 4

2001–02, 2003–04, 2006–07, 2007–08

- Colts Cup Competition: 4

1996-97, 2001–02, 2006–07, 2007–08

- Promotion to Second Division: 1

2007-08

S.C. Adelaide has qualified for the 2008/09 second division but is yet to register the club for the season. They qualified as a wild card for the Zone 1 playoffs after winning the youth (Colts Football) league, they were included in one of three playoffs groups which consisted of one of three relegated teams from the second division – Palma F.C. and two first and second placed teams from the third division – Great African United and Techiman Universal Stars respectively. The fielded the youngest team with an average age of a little over 16, including 14-year-old left midfield sensation Jimmy Addo touted the new Ryan Giggs, none of the players was over 17 years.

Team	Pld	W	D	L	GF	GA	GD	Pts
(Ghana) S.C. Adelaide	6	4	2	0	14	3	+11	14
(Ghana) Great African United	6	2	4	0	9	5	+4	10
(Ghana) Palma F.C.	6	1	1	4	6	10	−4	4
(Ghana) Techiman Universal Stars	6	1	1	4	2	13	−11	4

Matchday One
Great African United	1–1	S.C. Adelaide
Palma F.C.	0–1	Techiman Universal Stars
Matchday Two
Techiman Universal Stars	0–2	Great African United
S.C. Adelaide	2–1	Palma F.C.
Matchday Three
S.C. Adelaide	5–0	Techiman Universal Stars
Great African United	1–1	Palma F.C.
Matchday Four
Techiman Universal Stars	0–4	S.C. Adelaide
Great African United	4–2	Palma F.C.
Matchday Five
S.C. Adelaide	1–1	Great African United
Techiman Universal Stars	1–2	Palma F.C.
Matchday Six
Great African United	0–0	Techiman Universal Stars
Palma F.C.	0–1	S.C. Adelaide

== S.C. Adelaide All Time Best XI ==
At the close of the League 2007–08 the supporters voted for the all-time best Adelaide XI.

1	GK	GHA	Joseph Addo
4	DF	GHA	Samuel Inkoom
2	DF	GHA	Daniel Opare
5	DF	GHA	Jonathan Mensah
6	DF	GHA	David Addy
3	DF	GHA	Paul Addo
8	MF	GHA	Anthony Annan
11	MF	GHA	Mubarak Wakaso
7	FW	GHA	Ransford Osei
10	FW	GHA	Sadick Adams
9	FW	GHA	Eric Bekoe
