= Nmai Dzorn =

Nmai Djorn
- Town
- Country: Ghana
- Region: Greater Accra Region
- District: Accra Metropolitan
- Time zone: GMT
  - Summer (DST): GMT

Nmai Dzorn is a town in the Adentan Municipality, a municipality in the Greater Accra Region of Ghana It is mainly a residential settlement with a few commercial uses. Trasacco Estate, a high income gated community in Ghana is located at the periphery of the town. Ayensu River Estate also has a settlement within Nmai Dzorn. Zoomlion Ghana Limited, a giant in waste management and environmental sanitation in Ghana and across Africa is headquartered in Nmai Dzorn. The population of the area has increased over the past ten years mainly due to the expanding settlement outside Accra Metropolis. This settlement boast of educational facilities from the junior level up to the tertiary level starting with the Nii Sowah Din Primary and Junior Secondary School. Galaxy International School's secondary facility is located within five minutes from Nmai Dzorn. The Canadian International School is also located within the environs.
