= Deduako =

- Town
- Location of Deduako in Ashanti Region, South Ghana
- Coordinates: 6°38′20″N 1°28′21″W
- Country: Ghana
- Region: Ashanti Region
- District: Oforikrom Municipal District
- Elevation: 262 m (860 ft)

Population
  - Total: 140,161 in 2,015
- Time zone: GMT
  - Summer (DST): GMT

Deduako is a suburb of the Oforikrom Municipality, which is part of the Kumasi Metropolitan Assembly in Ghana. It is located within the Ashanti Region and serves as a residential and commercial area. Deduako is part of the Kumasi metropolis, known as one of the largest and most vibrant cities in Ghana. The town serves as a residential hub for local inhabitants as well as students from the nearby Kwame Nkrumah University of Science and Technology (KNUST). Its proximity to KNUST makes it a popular area for student housing and related commercial activities.
