= Berlin F.C. =

Berlin FC
- Full name: Berlin FC
- Ground: Nana Ameyaw Park, Techiman, Ghana
- League: Division One League Zone 1A

Berlin FC is a Ghanaian professional football team based in Techiman that plays in the 1B Zone of the Ghana Division One League. Zone 1A has seven competing teams from the part of the Ashanti Region, Brong Ahafo Region and the three Northern Regions of Ghana.
