= Tuobodom =

- Nickname: TBD
- Location in Ghana
- Coordinates: 7°38′N 1°54′W
- Country: Ghana
- Region: Bono East region

Tuobodom is a town in the Bono East region of Ghana. Tuobodom is the capital for the Techiman North District created by the then President of Ghana Professor John Evans Atta Mills. The inhabitants of the town are mainly farmers with some percentage being traders and other government workers. Tuobodom is the capital of Techiman North District of the Bono East region with some adjoining towns like Aworowa, Buoyem, Offuman, Tano Boase and their environs. The main crop that the farmers grow are Tomato and green pepper. Tomato and green pepper are grown on a large scale in the town which helps support the livelihood of the residents.
