= Voradep Ho F.C. =

Voradep
- Full name: Voradep Ho Football Club
- Ground: Ho Sports Stadium
- Capacity: 6000
- League: Ghana Football Leagues
Home colours	Away colours	Third colours

Voradep Ho FC (often called Voradep) is a Ghanaian professional football club based in Ho. They currently compete in the Volta Regional Division 2 league.

In 1992, the team won the Ghanaian FA Cup

== Honours ==
- Ghanaian FA Cup: 1992

== Performance in CAF competitions ==
- 1993 African Cup Winners' Cup: first round

== Current squad ==
As of 12 January 2017

For recent transfers, see List of transfers 2017

Note: Flags indicate national team as defined under FIFA eligibility rules; some limited exceptions apply. Players may hold more than one non-FIFA nationality.

No.	Pos.	Nation	Player
1	GK	GHA	ANDREWS QUAYE
2	DF	GHA	OKOE FRED
3	DF	GHA	FORSTER (captain)
4	MF	USA	SEBASTIAN ADDO
6	DF	GHA	KUMAKO GODWIN
7	MF	GHA	GBADEGBE FAFA
8	FW	GHA	GANAKU PATRICK
9	FW	GHA	Junior NANEVI
10	FW	GHA	ASASE FRANCIS
11	FW	GHA	KOASSI AGBESI
12	DF	GHA	GIDEON AGGOR
14	FW	GHA	TSALI JUSTICE
15	DF	GHA	AMADU MALLAM
11	FW	GHA	MAWULI TAMAKLOE
