= George Afriyie =

Ghanaian football administrator

George Kwasi Afriyie is a Ghanaian football administrator and businessman. He is currently the owner and President of Ghanaian club Planners Athletic Club which plays in the second-tier league. He previously served as the Vice President of the Ghana Football Association (GFA).

== Career ==
He was appointed Vice President of the Ghana Football Association (GFA) in November 2015. He served under Kwesi Nyantakyi who was the President of the Ghanaian football regulatory body from 30 December 2005 until 7 June 2018.

In 2017 he was appointed to serve on AFCON Organising Committee. In November 2014 he was appointed as the chairman of the Black Stars (Ghana national football team) management committee. Before his appointment to the Black Stars management committee he was the chairman of the Ghana national under-20 football team Management Committee.

In 2017 George Afriyie was named as the chairman of the Local Organising Committee for the 2017 WAFU Nations Cup which was hosted and won by Ghana. In August he reportedly resigned from the position of chairman of the LOC.

In September 2019 he picked forms to contest for the GFA Presidential Elections. On 25 October 2019 George Afriyie contested for the Ghana Football Association Presidential seat but he conceded defeat to Kurt Okraku in the third round.

In June 2020 he was linked to the vacant chief executive officer role at Asante Kotoko but he officially communicated that he has taken up a commitment which would not permit him to occupy the role. In June 2020 renowned Ghanaian businessman and politician Kennedy Agyapong stated during an interview that he will not invest in Ghana football because delegates failed to elect George Afriyie as GFA President.

== Clubs Managed ==
He was the chief executive officer of Swedru All Blacks F.C, a Ghanaian club based in Swedru. But, in October 2008 he quit his position as the CEO of the club. During his reign as the CEO of All Blacks F.C he secured a kit sponsorship deal with Japanese outfit Mizuno for the club. He led All Blacks to secure promotion back to the Ghana Premier League from Division in 2005.

In 2010 he acquired Division One League side Unity FC and qualified them to the Middle League from Zone in 2011. He is currently a director at Ghana Premier League side Liberty Professionals F.C, a position he had held for the past decade.

He is currently the owner and President of Division One League side Planners Athletic Club.

== National Team Positions ==
- Black Stars (Ghana national football team) Committee chairman
- Ghana national under-20 football team Management Committee chairman
