= F.C. Takoradi =

Takoradi Football Club
- Full name: Takoradi Football Club
- Nickname(s): Tadi Oilers,
- Short name: FC Takoradi, Takoradi FC
- Founded: 2009
- Ground: -
- Capacity: -
- Owner: T.B.A.
- Manager: T.B.A.
- Coach: T.B.A.
- League: Division 2 League
- Website: http://www.fctakoradi.com
Home colours	Away colours

Takoradi Football Club is also known F.C. Takoradi is a Ghanaian professional association football club based in Sekondi-Takoradi, Ghana. They are a currently playing in Division Two League.

== History ==
The team was founded in 2009 by Kim Grant a former Ghana Black stars member and professional player.

== Club badge and colours ==
Takoradi Football Club home colors are Red, White, and Green. Traditional away kit colors have been either White with red and black strips; however, in recent years several different colors have been used. The origins of the club's home colors are based on the countries flag.

Takoradi Football Club has only worn one badge on their shirts since being established in 2009, but the club has revamped its badge for 2017.

== Kit manufacturers and shirt sponsors ==
Takoradi Football Club does not currently have official shirts sponsors. Their kits have been supplied by Italian sports brand Legea since 2009 through technical sponsorship.
