= Planners Athletic Club =

- Full name: Planners Athletic Club
- Nickname: The Executioners
- Ground: CRIA Park, New Tafo
- President: George Afriyie
- Coach: Emmanuel Bulley
- League: Division one
- Website: www.plannersathleticclub.com

Planners Athletic Club, formerly Okyeman Planners Football Club, is a professional football club based in Tafo, Eastern Region, Ghana, that competes in division one (zone three), the second-tier of Ghanaian football. The club's maiden season in the first division saw them placed second to leaders Great Olympics of the 2015–16 league season. George Afriyie is the owner and President of Planners Athletic Club.

== History ==
The owner of Okyeman Planners F.C. in 2019 stated that he founded the club in 2000, but as at 2020 the club has the year 2015 on its badge.

The badge of Okyeman Planners F.C. included the motto Yen Nhwe Ma Ensei.

In February 2017, the club's match venue was decertified by the Club Licensing Board of the Ghana Football Association. The club needed to find another venue for upcoming home games, and are now based at the CRIA Park, New Tafo.

On changing the name of the club in February 2020 from Okyeman Planners F.C. to Planners Athletic Club, the nickname was changed from The Planners to The Executioners.

== Former players ==
William Opoku began his career with Okyeman Planners F.C., and Prosper Avor played for the club in 2015 and 2016.

== Head coach ==
Coach Emmanuel Bulley was appointed head coach of Planners Athletic Club in February 2020.

== Current squad ==
Note: Flags indicate national team as defined under FIFA eligibility rules; some limited exceptions apply. Players may hold more than one non-FIFA nationality.

No.	Pos.	Nation	Player
1	GK	GHA	Kwasi Nketiah
3	DF	GHA	Philip Awuku Gameli
6	MF	GHA	Joseph Ato Junior
7	MF	GHA	Nathaniel Yaw Korankye
8	DF	GHA	Nana Opare Agyeman
10	FW	GHA	Eric Abdul Razak Kipo
11	MF	GHA	Amon Kotey Richard
12	DF	GHA	Emmanuel McCarthy
13	MF	GHA	Johnson Ahorlu
14	DF	GHA	Samuel Spio Johnson
15	MF	GHA	Vincent Accam
9	FW	GHA	Seth Kumah

No.	Pos.	Nation	Player
16	GK	GHA	Rashid Musah
17	MF	GHA	Yussif Oduro
18	FW	GHA	Osman Haqi
19	FW	GHA	Samuel Dadebore
20	MF	GHA	Joshua Karbo
21	DF	GHA	Derek Etse Adusu
22	GK	GHA	Abdul Kadel
25	MF	GHA	Abdul Adams Junior
26	DF	GHA	Vitus Yamoah
29	MF	GHA	Bismark Dotse
32	MF	GHA	Wonder Gotah

== Management members ==
- Administrative Manager – Kwaku Boadu
- Communications Manager – Emmanuel Akyereko Frimpong
