= Ho Dynamo FC =

Ghanaian football club based in the Volta Region

- Full name: Dynamo Football Club
- Founded: 2006
- Ground: Ho Sports Stadium
- Capacity: 5,000
- Chairman: Daniel Agbogah
- Manager: James Bond Tumaku
- League: Ghana Division One League
Home colours

Dynamo FC is a Ghanaian football club, based in Ho in the Volta Region. The club is a Division One team currently competing in zone 3 of GN Bank Division One League. They play their home matches at the Ho Sports Stadium.

== History ==
The club was founded in the year 2006. Initially, the club took active part in juvenile league before graduating to take part in the Ho Municipal Division 3 League in 2008. After just one season, they earned promotion to play in the Volta Regional Division 2 League. They played in the Division 2 League for six seasons. After coming close on so many occasions to making it to the Division 1 League, they finally made it in 2016.

=== Qualification to Division One League. ===
In December 2016 after finishing top of their zone in the Volta Regional Division 2 League ahead of fierce rivals Home Stars FC, the club had to battle out with other zone winners in the region in the Volta Region Division 2 Middle League which consists of four teams. After a hard-fought 1–0 win over Nadm SC in their opening match, Dynamo lost their subsequent match against Juapong All Stars by the same scoreline. In their third and final match, Dynamo beat Narita F.C 4–1 with striker Johnson Nawanyo scoring a hat trick. Dynamo finished the league on six points, second behind Juapong All Stars only on head-to-head rule. However, the team launched series of protests against the Juapong based club. The Volta Regional Regional FA ruled in favour of Dynamo thus promoting them to the Ghana Division One league.

=== Division One ===
Dynamo made their Division One league debut on February 19, 2017, against Accra based side Vision FC which they lost 2–1. Their first win came at home on 1 March 2017, a 2–1 victory against Amidaus Professional.

== Sponsorship ==
The club has been supported by KickStart Ghana, an NGO which supports education and sports.
