= Ghana Football Leagues =

- Country: Ghana
- Confederation: CAF
- Level on pyramid: 2–4
- Domestic cup(s): Ghanaian FA Cup; Ghana Super Cup
- International cup: CAF Confederation Cup
- Broadcaster(s): GFA TV (Live Matches & Highlights)

List of Professional Leagues from Ghana under the Premier League.

== Division One League ==
The league is divided into three zones with a zone each in the southern, middle and northern sectors of the country.

=== 2020–21 ===
	Zone One	Zone Two	Zone Three
1	Berekum Arsenal	Achiken FC	Accra Lions FC
2	Bofoakwa Tano FC	Swedru All Blacks	Accra City Stars FC
3	Brong Ahafo United	Asokwa Deportivo FC	Agbozume Weavers FC
4	Paga Crocodiles Stars FC	BYF Academy	Akosombo Krystal Palace FC
5	Kintampo FC	FC Samartex	Amidaus Professionals FC
6	Nkoranza Warriors SC	Bibiani Gold stars FC	Danbort FC
7	Nsoatreman FC	Sekondi Hasaacas FC	Heart of Lions FC
8	Real Tamale United	New Edubiase United	Kotoku Royals FC
9	Steadfast FC	Nzema Kotoko F.C.	Nania FC
10	Tamale City FC	Pacific Heroes FC	Okyeman Planners FC
11	Techiman City FC	Proud United FC	Phar Rangers
12	Unity FC	Skyy FC	Tema Youth FC
13	Wa Suntaa Sporting Club	Star Madrid FC	Tudu Mights Jets FC
14	Wamanafo Mighty Royals	Unistar Academy FC	Uncle 'T' FC
15	Yendi Gbewaa FC	Venomous Vipers	Vision FC
16	Young Apostles FC	Wassaman United	Young Wise FC

== Division Two League ==
2011–12 teams

=== Middle League ===
Brong Ahafo Football Association

Zone A

- Berekum Berlin FC
- Mim Freedom Fighters
- Techiman Kenten AC Milan

Zone B

- Japeikrom Asuo PRU
- Nsoatreman FC (Nsoatre)
- Techiman GSP United

Central Regional Football Association

- Abreshia United
- Adansi Praso WAECO FC
- Agona Swedru Amanpong FC
- Cape Coast Nadel Ahli Rovers
- Ekotsi Hi-Kings FC (also listed as Gomoa Assin Hi-Kings)
- F.C. Takoradi

Eastern Regional Football Association

- Akosombo Sparks FC
- Amasaman Bright Future FC
- Dawu Sporting Club
- Kwahu Abetifi Odwen Anomah FC
- Real Sportive (Tema)

Greater Accra Regional Football Association

- Easy Classics
- Great Stars
- Power F.C. (Koforidua)
- Royal Knights (Nsawam)
- Shelter Force

== Division Three League ==
2011–12 teams

- Jancole Football Academy (Darkuman-Accra)
- Akotex FC (Tema)
- Cornerstones
- Dumas Boys of GTP (Tema)
- Dunkwa-On-Offin Starke FC
- Ghapoha FC
- Monsasonic FC
- Great Ashantis
- Mankessim Striking Force
- Neoplan Stars
- Palma F.C.
- S.C. Adelaide
- Techiman Universal Stars
- Thirds World
- Voradep
- Accra angels soccer academy
- Sharp Arrows ((Kanda 441))
- Great African United
- Royal Eagle Football club (Dansoman)

== GAFCOA ==
The Ghana Amateur Football Club Owners Association (GAFCOA) is an association of amateur (2nd, 3rd and juvenile) club owners who seek the development of the named category and quality players.
