= 2021 Ghana FA Cup =

41st season of Ghana's primary cup competition

2021 Ghanaian FA Cup
2021 MTN FA Cup

Tournament details
- Country: Ghana
- Teams: 110 (all)

Final positions
- Champions: Accra Hearts of Oak
- Runners-up: Ashanti Gold

Tournament statistics
- Top goal scorer(s): Daniel Afriyie Barnieh (5 goals)

The 2021 Ghana FA Cup was the 41st season of the Ghana FA Cup, the primary knockout competition in Ghanaian football. Sponsored by MTN Ghana for the 11th straight season, thus called the "MTN FA Cup" for sponsorship purposes,

== History ==
Due to the shortcomings within the Ghana Football Association due to the dissolution of the GFA in June 2018, as a result of the Anas Number 12 Expose and the COVID-19 pandemic, the FA Cup has not been fully organised until 2021. From 2019 to 2021, Wilson Arthur was the chairman of the FA Cup committee, tasked to ensure a successful organization of the Cup competition.

== Format ==
A total of 110 clubs consisting of 18 Premier League Clubs, 48 Division One League Clubs and 44 Division Two League Clubs from the Regional Football Associations will participate in this year's competition.

The preliminary round stage of the cup would be played between the 48 Division One Clubs and 44 Division Two clubs totalling 92 clubs across the country.

The Preliminary stage of the competition is scheduled for 14 May to 20 May 2021. The Winners of the preliminary round will progress to the round of 64 where they would be drawn against the 18 Premier League clubs.

The Winner of the MTN FA Cup shall represent Ghana in the 2021–22 CAF Confederation Cup.

== Preliminary round ==
The draw for the preliminary round was made on 4 May 2021.

14 May 2021	Attram De Visser Soccer Academy (3)	5–1	Star Makers FC (3)	Accra
15:00 GMT				Stadium: McDan La Town Park; Attendance: 0

14 May 2021	Steadfast FC (2)	10–0	Great Amphibians FC (3)	Tamale
GMT				Stadium: Aliu Mahama Stadium; Attendance: 0

14 May 2021	Sunyani Reformers FC (3)	0–0 (6–5 p)	Bibiani Gold Stars F.C. (2)	Sunyani
GMT				Stadium: Sunyani Coronation Park; Attendance: 0

14 May 2021	Windy Professionals FC (3)	4–1	Soccer Intellectual FC (3)	Winneba
GMT				Stadium: Swedru Stadium; Attendance: 0

14 May 2021	Adidome Unity Stars (3)	0–1	Akatsi All Stars (3)	Agbozume
GMT				Stadium: Somey SHS Park; Attendance: 0

15 May 2021	Sekondi Eleven Wise FC (3)	1–1 (4–2 p)	Proud United FC (2)	Sekondi
GMT				Stadium: Gyandu Park; Attendance: 0

15 May 2021	Suamponmang United FC (3)	1–2	Metro Stars FC (3)	Accra
GMT				Stadium: Assin Fosu Park; Attendance: 0

15 May 2021	Tamale Sky FC (3)	1–2	Tamale City FC (3)	Tamale
GMT				Stadium: Aliu Mahama Stadium; Attendance: 0

15 May 2021	Bofoakwa Tano F.C. (2)	2–1	Berekum Barcelona FC (3)	Sunyani
GMT				Stadium: Sunyani Coronation Park; Attendance: 0

15 May 2021	Techiman City FC (2)	w/o	Unity F.C. (2)
GMT				Attendance: 0

15 May 2021	Vision F.C. (2)	0–2	Third World FC (3)	Tema
GMT				Stadium: Tema Stadium; Attendance: 0

15 May 2021	Wa Yassin FC (3)	1–2	Real 24 Hours (3)	Wa
GMT				Stadium: Wa Stadium; Attendance: 0

15 May 2021	Winneba United (3)	0–1	Stars Madrid (2)	Agona Swedru
GMT				Stadium: Swedru Stadium; Attendance: 0

15 May 2021	Accra City Stars F.C. (2)	4–0	Emmanuel F.C. (3)	Accra
GMT				Stadium: MATS Park; Attendance: 0

15 May 2021	Asokwa Deportivo (2)	w/o	Afrigya Shooting Stars (3)	Obuasi
GMT				Stadium: Len Clay Stadium; Attendance: 0

15 May 2021	Blue Skies Pelican FC (3)	0–2	Okwawu United (3)	Doboro
GMT				Stadium: Blue Skies Park; Attendance: 0

15 May 2021	Kintampo Top Talents FC (3)	2–0	Nsotreman FC (2)	Kintampo
GMT				Stadium: Kintampo Rawlings Park; Attendance: 0

15 May 2021	New Edubiase United F.C. (2)	0–1	Unistar Academy FC (2)	Bekwai
GMT				Stadium: Nana Gyamfi Park; Attendance: 0

16 May 2021	Tudu Mighty Jets F.C. (2)	1–0	Accra Lions FC (2)	Accra
GMT				Stadium: MATS Park; Attendance: 0

16 May 2021	Nkwantaman United (3)	2–2 (1–4 p)	Aboi Young Stars (3)	Bibiani
GMT				Stadium: Bibiani Park; Attendance: 0

16 May 2021	Okyeman Planners F.C. (2)	1–0	Kotoku Royals F.C. (2)	Tafo
GMT				Stadium: Old Tafo Royals Park; Attendance: 0

16 May 2021	Phar Rangers (2)	1–0	Krystal Palace (2)	Mampong
GMT				Stadium: Mampong; Attendance: 0

16 May 2021	Real Tamale United (2)	8–0	Gbewaa FC (2)	Tamale
GMT				Stadium: Aliu Mahama Stadium; Attendance: 0

16 May 2021	Skyy FC (2)	1–0	Nzema Kotoko (2)	Daboase
GMT				Stadium: Saint Martins SHS Park; Attendance: 0

16 May 2021	Kintampo United (2)	4–0	Young Zobzia FC (3)	Kintampo
GMT				Stadium: Kintampo Rawlings Park; Attendance: 0

16 May 2021	Young Wise FC (2)	0–0 (6–5 p)	F.C. Nania (2)	Accra
GMT				Stadium: Dobro Park; Attendance: 0

16 May 2021	Achiken FC (2)	1–1 (4–5 p)	BYF Academy (2)	Assin Fosu
GMT				Stadium: Assin Foso Jomsco Park; Attendance: 0

16 May 2021	BA Stars F.C. (2)	0–1	Young Apostle (2)	Sunyani
GMT				Stadium: Sunyani Coronation Park; Attendance: 0

16 May 2021	Berekum Arsenal F.C. (2)	1–1 (3–4 p)	Kato Freedom Fighters (3)	Berekum
GMT				Stadium: Berekum Golden City Park; Attendance: 0

16 May 2021	All Blacks F.C. (2)	0–2	Venomous Vipers (2)	Swedru
GMT				Stadium: Swedru Stadium; Attendance: 0

16 May 2021	Tema Youth F.C. (2)	1–1 (4–3 p)	Danbort FC (2)	Tema
GMT				Stadium: Tema Stadium; Attendance: 0

16 May 2021	Uncle 'T' FC (2)	1–0	Teshie Unique FC (3)	Prampram
GMT				Stadium: GSCE; Attendance: 0

16 May 2021	Wa Suntaa Sporting Club (2)	0–1	Sombo Freedom Stars (3)	Wa
GMT				Stadium: Wa Stadium; Attendance: 0

16 May 2021	Zuarungu FC (3)	0–8	Paga Crocodiles Stars FC (2)	Paga
GMT				Stadium: Paga Stadium; Attendance: 0

16 May 2021	Pacific Heroes (2)	1–1 (3–4 p)	Riverplate Athletic Club (3)	Agogo
GMT				Stadium: Collins JHS Park; Attendance: 0

16 May 2021	Bolga Soccer Masters (3)	2–1	Garu United (3)	Bolgatanga
GMT				Stadium: Bolgatanga; Attendance: 0

16 May 2021	Dolphins Fc (3)	0–5	Sekondi Hasaacas F.C. (2)	Sekondi
GMT				Stadium: Gyandu Park; Attendance: 0

16 May 2021	Kade United (3)	2–0	Bazuka FC (3)	Kade
GMT				Stadium: Oda Stadium; Attendance: 0

16 May 2021	Kanyasi New Dreams FC (3)	2–1	Nkoraza FC (2)	Kenyasi
GMT				Stadium: Kanyasi Town Park; Attendance: 0

16 May 2021	Kumawuman United FC (3)	0–2	Wassaman United (2)	Ejisu
GMT				Stadium: Okese Park; Attendance: 0

16 May 2021	Likpe Heroes (3)	1–1 (4–5 p)	Heart of Lions F.C. (2)	Kpando
GMT				Stadium: Kpando Park; Attendance: 0

17 May 2021	DC United F.C. (3)	0–2	Wamanafo Mighty Royals (2)	Sunyani
GMT				Stadium: Sunyani Coronation Park; Attendance: 0

17 May 2021	TTU Stars (3)	0–4	Samartex (2)	Sekondi
GMT				Stadium: Gyandu Park; Attendance: 0

17 May 2021	Bebeto FC (3)	2–1	Abgozume Weavers FC (2)	Sogakope
GMT				Stadium: WAFA Park; Attendance: 0

17 May 2021	Thunderbolt FC (3)	3–1	Owerriman FC (3)	Ejisu
GMT				Stadium: Okese Park; Attendance: 0

17 May 2021	Amidaus Professionals F.C. (2)	w/o	Charity Stars FC (3)
GMT				Attendance: 0

== Round of 64 ==
The live draw for the 2020/21 MTN FA Cup Round of 64 was held live on Max TV on 20 May 2021.

30 May 2021	Venomous Vipers (2)	1–0	Star Madrid FC (3)	Tema
GMT				Stadium: Robert Mensah Park; Attendance: 0

30 May 2021	Unistar Academy FC (2)	0–1	Windy Professionals FC (3)	Swedru
GMT				Stadium: Swedru Park; Attendance: 0

30 May 2021	Aboi Young Stars FC (3)	1–1 (6–5 p)	Samartex (2)	Bibiani
GMT				Stadium: Bibiani Park; Attendance: 0

30 May 2021	Accra City Stars F.C. (2)	2–2 (3–4 p)	Third World FC (3)	Teshie
GMT				Stadium: MATS Park; Attendance: 0

30 May 2021	Okyeman Planners F.C. (2)	0–0 (4–5 p)	Young Wise FC (2)	Old Tafo
GMT				Stadium: Rovers Park; Attendance: 0

30 May 2021	Kenyasi New Dreams FC (3)	0–0 (4–5 p)	Sunyani Reformers FC (3)	Kenyasi
GMT				Stadium: Kenyasi Town Park; Attendance: 0

30 May 2021	Young Apostles FC (2)	1–1 (4–5 p)	Techiman City FC (2)	Sunyani
GMT				Stadium: Coronation Park; Attendance: 0

30 May 2021	River Plate Athletic Club (3)	0–2	Thunderbolt FC (3)	Kumasi
GMT				Stadium: Wesco Park; Attendance: 0

30 May 2021	Heart of Lions F.C. (2)	2–1	Bebeto FC (3)	Kpandu
GMT				Stadium: Kpandu Park; Attendance: 0

30 May 2021	Paga Crocodiles Stars FC (2)	0–0 (4–2 p)	Sombo Freedom Stars (3)	Paga
GMT				Stadium: Paga Park; Attendance: 0

30 May 2021	Real 24 Hours FC (3)	1–2	Steadfast FC (2)	Wa
GMT				Stadium: Wa Stadium; Attendance: 0

30 May 2021	Kintampo United (2)	1–0	Bolga Soccer Masters FC (3)	Kintampo
GMT				Stadium: Kintampo Park; Attendance: 0

30 May 2021	Real Tamale United (2)	1–1 (4–5 p)	Tamale City FC (3)	Tamale
GMT				Stadium: Tamale Stadium Park; Attendance: 0

30 May 2021	Attram De Visser Soccer Academy (3)	1–0	Tudu Mighty Jets F.C. (2)	Doboro
GMT				Stadium: Blue Skies Park; Attendance: 0

31 May 2021	Wassaman United (2)	0–0 (7–8 p)	Asokwa Deportivo FC (2)	Ejisu
GMT				Stadium: Okese Park; Attendance: 0

31 May 2021	Kintampo Top Talents FC (3)	1–1 (5–4 p)	Wamanafo Mighty Royals (2)	Kintampo
GMT				Stadium: Kintampo Park; Attendance: 0

31 May 2021	Kade United (3)	0–0 (0–3 p)	Okwawu United (3)	Akim Oda
GMT				Stadium: Oda Stadium; Attendance: 0

1 June 2021	Sekondi Hasaacas F.C. (2)	1–1 (2–4 p)	Karela United FC (1)	Sekondi
GMT				Stadium: Gyandu Park; Attendance: 0

1 June 2021	Accra Great Olympics F.C. (1)	2–0	Charity Stars FC (3)	Accra
GMT				Stadium: Accra Sports Stadium; Attendance: 0

2 June 2021	Elmina Sharks F.C. (1)	2–0	Metro Stars FC (3)	Elmina
GMT				Stadium: Nduom Sports Complex; Attendance: 0

2 June 2021	Sekondi Eleven Wise FC (3)	0–1	Medeama S.C. (1)	Sekondi
GMT				Stadium: Gyandu Park; Attendance: 0

2 June 2021	Tema Youth F.C. (2)	5–1	International Allies F.C. (1)	Tema
GMT				Stadium: Tema Stadium; Attendance: 0

2 June 2021	Hearts of Oak (1)	3–0	Liberty Professionals (1)	Accra
GMT		Report		Stadium: Accra sports stadium Attendance: 0

2 June 2021	Phar Rangers (2)	2–2 (4–2 p)	Dreams (1)	Mampong
GMT				Stadium: Mampong Park; Attendance: 0

2 June 2021	Aduana Stars (1)	1–0	Eleven Wonders (1)	Dormaa Ahenkro
GMT				Stadium: Agyeman Badu Stadium; Attendance: 0

2 June 2021	Berekum Chelsea F.C. (1)	3–1	Bofoakwa Tano F.C. (2)	Berekum
GMT				Stadium: Golden City Park; Attendance: 0

2 June 2021	BYF Academy (2)	0–2	Asante Kotoko S.C. (1)	Bekwai
GMT				Stadium: Bekwei; Attendance: 0

2 June 2021	King Faisal Babes F.C. (1)	0–1	Ashanti Gold S.C. (1)	Techiman
GMT				Stadium: Ohene Ameyaw Park; Attendance: 0

2 June 2021	WAFA (1)	4–0	Akatsi All Stars (3)	South Tongu District
GMT				Stadium: WAFA Park; Attendance: 0

2 June 2021	Skyy FC (2)	2–0	Ebusua Dwarfs (1)	Daboase
GMT				Stadium: Daboase; Attendance: 0

3 June 2021	Legon Cities (1)	2–1	Uncle 'T' FC (2)	Accra
GMT				Stadium: Accra Sports Stadium; Attendance: 0

3 June 2021	Kato Freedom Fighters (3)	1–0	Bechem United (1)	Bechem
GMT				Stadium: Bechem; Attendance: 0

== Round of 32 ==
The draw for the MTN FA Cup Round of 32 was held on Thursday at the MTN House in Accra.

The colourful event was attended by competition sponsors MTN, broadcast sponsors StarTimes and officials of the GFA.

The 32 teams comprised eleven (11) Premier League clubs, twelve (12) Division One clubs and nine (9) Division Two teams who progressed from the Round of 64 stage.

18 June 2021	Kintampo United (2)	2–0	Sunyani Reformers FC (3)	Kintampo
GMT				Stadium: Kintampo Park; Attendance: 0

19 June 2021	Steadfast FC (2)	1–4	Berekum Chelsea F.C. (1)	Tamale
GMT				Stadium: Aliu Mahama Stadium; Attendance: 0

19 June 2021	Legon Cities (1)	w/o	Phar Rangers (2)	Accra
GMT				Stadium: Accra Sports Stadium; Attendance: 0

19 June 2021	Paga Crocodiles Stars FC (2)	0–1	Aduana Stars (1)	Paga
GMT				Stadium: Paga Town Park; Attendance: 0

19 June 2021	Thunderbolt FC (3)	1–3	Asante Kotoko (1)	Ejisu
GMT				Stadium: Okese Park; Attendance: 0

20 June 2021	Okwawu United F.C. (3)	1–1 (0–3 p)	Attram De Visser Soccer Academy (3)	New Abirem
GMT				Stadium: Ofori Park; Attendance: 0

20 June 2021	Aboi Young Stars (3)	1–2	Ashanti Gold (1)	Bibiani
GMT				Stadium: Samraboi; Attendance: 0

20 June 2021	Techiman City FC (2)	1–0	Tamale City FC (3)	Tamale
GMT				Stadium: Aliu Mahama Stadium; Attendance: 0

20 June 2021	Asokwa Deportivo FC (2)	1–0	Skyy FC (2)	Ejisu
GMT				Stadium: Okese Park; Attendance: 0

20 June 2021	Karela United (1)	1–0	Medeama (1)	Anyinase
GMT				Stadium: CAM Park; Attendance: 0

20 June 2021	Elmina Sharks (1)	0–0 (4–2 p)	Venomous Vipers (2)	Elmina
GMT				Stadium: Nduom Sports Stadium; Attendance: 0

20 June 2021	Kintampo Top Talents FC (3)	2–1	Kato Freedom Fighters FC (3)	Kintampo
GMT				Stadium: Kintampo Park; Attendance: 0

20 June 2021	Young Wise FC (2)	1–1 (6–5 p)	WAFA (1)	Dobro
GMT				Stadium: Blue Skies Park; Attendance: 0

20 June 2021	Heart of Lions (2)	0–0 (3–4 p)	Great Olympics (1)	Kpando
GMT				Stadium: Kpando Stadium; Attendance: 0

21 June 2021	Third World FC (3)	0–1	Tema Youth (2)	Dobro
GMT				Stadium: Blue Skies Park; Attendance: 0

21 June 2021	Hearts of Oak (1)	4–1	Windy Professionals FC (3)	Accra
GMT				Stadium: Accra Sports Stadium; Attendance: 0

== Round of 16 ==
The draw for the MTN FA Cup Round of 16 stage was held on 29 June 2021.

This round involved nine teams from the Ghana Premier League (level 1), five teams from the Ghana Division One League (level 2) and two teams from Ghana Division Two League (level 3).

6 July 2021	Asante Kotoko (1)	2–1	Asokwa Deportivo (2)	Obuasi
15:00 GMT		Report		Stadium: Len Clay Stadium; Attendance: 0

7 July 2021	Aduana Stars (1)	2–4	Ashanti Gold (1)	Dormaa Ahenkro
GMT				Stadium: Agyeman Badu Stadium; Attendance: 0

7 July 2021	Kintampo Top Talents (3)	3–2	Tamale City (2)	Kintampo
GMT				Stadium: Kintampo Park; Attendance: 0

8 July 2021	Kintampo United (2)	1–1 (4–5 p)	Berekum Chelsea (1)	Kintampo
GMT				Stadium: Kintampo Park; Attendance: 0

8 July 2021	Accra Young Wise (2)	0–1	Hearts of Oak (1)	Dawu
15:00 GMT		Report		Stadium: Theatre of Dreams; Attendance: 0

8 July 2021	Attram De Visser Soccer Academy (3)	1–1 (5–4 p)	Legon Cities (1)	Accra
15:00 GMT				Stadium: Accra Sports Stadium; Attendance: 0

8 July 2021	Medeama (1)	0–0 (5–4 p)	Great Olympics (1)	Tarkwa
15:00 GMT				Stadium: Akoon Park; Attendance: 0

8 July 2021	Elmina Sharks (1)	1–1 (3–2 p)	Tema Youth (2)	Elmina
18:00 GMT				Stadium: Nduom Sports Stadium; Attendance: 0

== Quarter-finals ==
The draw for the MTN FA Cup Quarter finals stage was held on 15 July 2021 in the studio of StarTimes Adepa channel 247 and Max TV in Accra at 3pm and broadcast live on MAX TV.

The round featured six teams from the Ghana Premier League (level 1) and two teams from the Ghana Division Two League (level 3).

24 July 2021	Ashanti Gold (1)	4–2	Kintampo Top Talents (3)	Obuasi
15:00GMT	Akoto 16'; Agyemang 28' de Vries 48'; Addai 70'	Report	Amoako 35' (o.g.); Sarkodie 90'	Stadium: Len Clay Stadium; Attendance: 0

24 July 2021	Elmina Sharks (1)	0–1 (a.e.t.)	Hearts of Oak (1)	Elmina
18:00 GMT		Report	Amankwah 107'	Stadium: Nduom Sports Stadium; Attendance: 0

25 July 2021	Asante Kotoko (1)	0–0 (4–5 p)	Berekum Chelsea (1)	Obuasi
15:00 GMT		Report		Stadium: Len Clay Stadium; Attendance: 0
	Penalties
	Asmah (penalty scored); Adomako (penalty scored); Gama (penalty scored); Adams (penalty missed); Keyekeh (penalty scored)		(penalty scored) Badu; (penalty scored) Ameyaw; (penalty scored) Ainsu; (penalty scored) Sarfo; (penalty scored) Amankona

25 July 2021	Medeama (1)	3–2 (a.e.t.)	Attram De Visser Soccer Academy (3)	Tarkwa
18:00 GMT	Arthur 44'; Touré 56'; Agyemang 105' (pen.)	Report	Anim 64'; Sakyi 73'	Stadium: Akoon Park; Attendance: 0

== Semi-finals ==
The four winners from the quarter-finals played two ties played on 1 August 2021. Both games were played at the Cape Coast Sports Stadium

1 August 2021	Ashanti Gold (1)	4–1 (a.e.t.)	Berekum Chelsea (1)	Cape Coast
15:00 GMT	Esso 45'; Nkrumah 91'; Addai 105'; Osei 117'	Report	Sarfo 51'	Stadium: Cape Coast Sports Stadium; Attendance: 0

1 August 2021	Hearts of Oak (1)	3–0	Medeama (1)	Cape Coast
18:00 GMT	Afutu 12'; Mensah 58'; Afriyie 67' (pen.)	Report		Stadium: Cape Coast Sports Stadium; Attendance: 0

== Final ==
8 August 2021	Hearts of Oak (1)	0–0 (8–7 p)	Ashanti Gold (1)	Accra
18:00 GMT				Stadium: Accra Sports Stadium; Attendance: 0 Referee: Daniel Nii Laryea
	Penalties
	Mohammed (penalty scored); Nettey (penalty scored); Amankwah (penalty missed); Sowah (penalty scored); Afriyie (penalty missed); Alhassan (penalty scored); Aidoo (penalty scored); Ovouka (penalty scored); Ibrahim (penalty scored); Afutu (penalty missed); Attah (penalty scored)		(penalty missed) Addai; (penalty scored) Dacosta; (penalty missed) Abagna; (penalty scored) Banahene; (penalty scored) Akoto; (penalty scored) Annor; (penalty scored) Agyemang; (penalty scored) Nkrumah; (penalty scored) Agyemang; (penalty missed) Osei; (penalty missed) Mensah

== See also ==
- 2020–21 Ghana Premier League
- 2021 Ghana Women's FA Cup
