= Rural Training School, Kintampo =

Health institution in Ghana

The Rural Training School now College of Health and Well-Being is public tertiary health institution in Kintampo formerly in the Brong Ahafo Region and currently in the Bono East Region of Ghana. The school is in the Kintampo District. The activities of the institution is supervised by the Ministry of Health. The Nurses and Midwifery Council (NMC) is the regulates the activities, curriculum and examination of the student nurses and midwives. The council's mandate Is enshrined under section 4(1) of N.R.C.D 117.
