= Kintampo =

Kintampo refers to the following locations in Ghana:

- Kintampo District, a former district in the Brong Ahafo Region that was split into two parts in 2003
  - Kintampo South District
  - Kintampo North Municipal District
- Kintampo, Ghana, the capital town of Kintampo North District
- Kintampo Complex, a prehistoric archaeological complex that emerged in West Africa
- Kintampo waterfalls, a waterfall in Ghana
