= OWU (disambiguation) =

OWU may refer to:

== Educational Institutions ==
- Ohio Wesleyan University in Delaware, Ohio, United States
- Oklahoma Wesleyan University in Bartlesville, Oklahoma, United States

== Other uses ==
- George Owu (born 1982), Ghanaian football player
- Owu Kingdom, of the Egba people of Nigeria
