= Victoria Nyame =

Ghanaian politician (died 1980)

Victoria Nyame MP
- Nyame in 1979

Member of Parliament for Kintampo
- In office 1965–1966
- Preceded by: Constituency established
- Succeeded by: Parliament suspended

Personal details
- Died: 13 September 1980 Accra, Ghana
- Party: Convention People's Party

Victoria Nyame (died 13 September 1980) was a Ghanaian politician who served in the Parliament of Ghana from 1965 until 1966. A member of the Convention People's Party, Nyame represented the town of Kintampo.

== Biography ==
Victoria Nyame was elected to represent the Kintampo constituency in the Parliament of Ghana following the 1965 Ghanaian parliamentary election, one of 18 women elected that year. Nyame was elected unopposed, as the Convention People's Party was the sole legal party and candidates were selected by its central committee. In her first speech in parliament, Nyame spoke on education: praising President Kwame Nkrumah's plan to make all education in Ghana free, Nyame spoke of the importance for women to have access to higher education and proposed the establishment of educational institutions for women in the Brong-Ahafo region. Nyame also aligned closely with Nkrumah, and celebrated the establishment of the Organisation of African Unity. In another speech in 1965, Nyame criticized Ian Smith, the prime minister of Rhodesia, stating that he was representative of the "evils of colonialism".

Following her parliamentary career, Nyame remained politically active. She served on a commission investigating the State Housing Corporation in 1968, and was appointed an inspector within the Ministry of Education in 1980. Later in 1980, Nyame was appointed Ghana's envoy to India. During a celebratory luncheon on 11 September 1980, Nyame fell ill and was taken to the 37 Military Hospital in Accra, where she died two days later.
