= Kjetil Zachariassen =

Norwegian association football coach

Personal information
- Date of birth: 30 November 1968 (age 57)
- Place of birth: Norway

Managerial career
- Years: Team
- 2009: Stella Club d'Adjamé
- 2019: Ashanti Gold S.C.
- 2019: Asante Kotoko S.C.

Kjetil Zachariassen (born 30 November 1968 in Norway) is a Norwegian association football coach.

He was previously the coach of Asante Kotoko S.C. and Ashanti Gold S.C. where he replaced Svetislav Tanasijevic in the second round of the Normalisation Committee Special Competition.

== Career ==
Zachariassen started his professional coaching career in 2000. In November 2007 he moved to Ivory Coast where he with two others started a football academy. He initially traveled to Ivory Coast to find talent which at that time he was working for Portsmouth F.C. Under Harry Redknapp and Neil Masters. In 2009, he was appointed the head coach of Stella Club d'Adjamé which at that time played tier 1 in the country's league. On 25 April 2019, he was appointed the coach of Ashanti Gold S.C.

On 6 July 2019 he resigned from Ashanti Gold S.C. after he was offered a position as head coach of Asante Kotoko S.C., replacing C.K. Akonnor. He was removed from the position on 13 November 2019.
