= New Longoro =

Coordinates: 8°08′40″N 2°01′46″W

New Longoro is a town in the Kintampo Municipal Assembly in the Bono East Region of Ghana. It is the second largest town in the Municipality. The town serves as the traditional home of the Dega people.

The people in the community are predominantly farmers. The town has a community day senior high school called New Longoro Community Day Senior High School.
