= Amissah Anfoh Assan =

Ghanaian footballer (born 1995)

Personal information
- Full name: Amissah Anfoh Assan
- Date of birth: 3 June 1995 (age 31)
- Place of birth: Accra, Ghana
- Height: 1.78 m (5 ft 10 in)
- Position: Defensive midfielder

Team information
- Current team: Tadamon Sour

Senior career*
| Years | Team | Apps | (Gls) |
| 2006–2008 | Kickers FC | | |
| 2008–2011 | Windy Professionals | 8 | |
| 2011–2013 | Abu Qair Semad | 105 | (7) |
| 2013–2014 | Tala'ea El-Gaish SC | 23 | |
| 2014–2015 | Haras El-Hodood SC | 18 | |
| 2015–2017 | Baghdad FC | 19 | |
| 2017–2020 | Al-Kahrabaa | 27 | (4) |
| 2020–2021 | Elmina Sharks | | |
| 2024 | Chabab Ghazieh | 11 | (0) |
| 2024- | Tadamon Sour | | |
- * Club domestic league appearances and goals as of 13:38, 2 May 2024 (UTC)

Amissah Anfoh Assan (born 3 June 1995) is a Ghanaian footballer who plays as a midfielder for Lebanese Premier League club Tadamon Sour.

== Early life ==
Born in Accra to Mercy Dadzie and Anfoh Assan, Assan attended Kaneshie West 2 JSS. He began his football career after graduating from T.I Ahmadiyya Secondary School in Gomoa Postin, Assan play at a local club called Windy Professionals which is formally known as National Sports College.

== Career ==
On March 28, 2020, it was announced thatAssan joined Ghanaian Premier League club Elmina Sharks.

He joined Chabab Ghazieh in the Lebanese Premier League in 2024.
