= Fuller Waterfalls =

Waterfall in the Bono East Region of Ghana

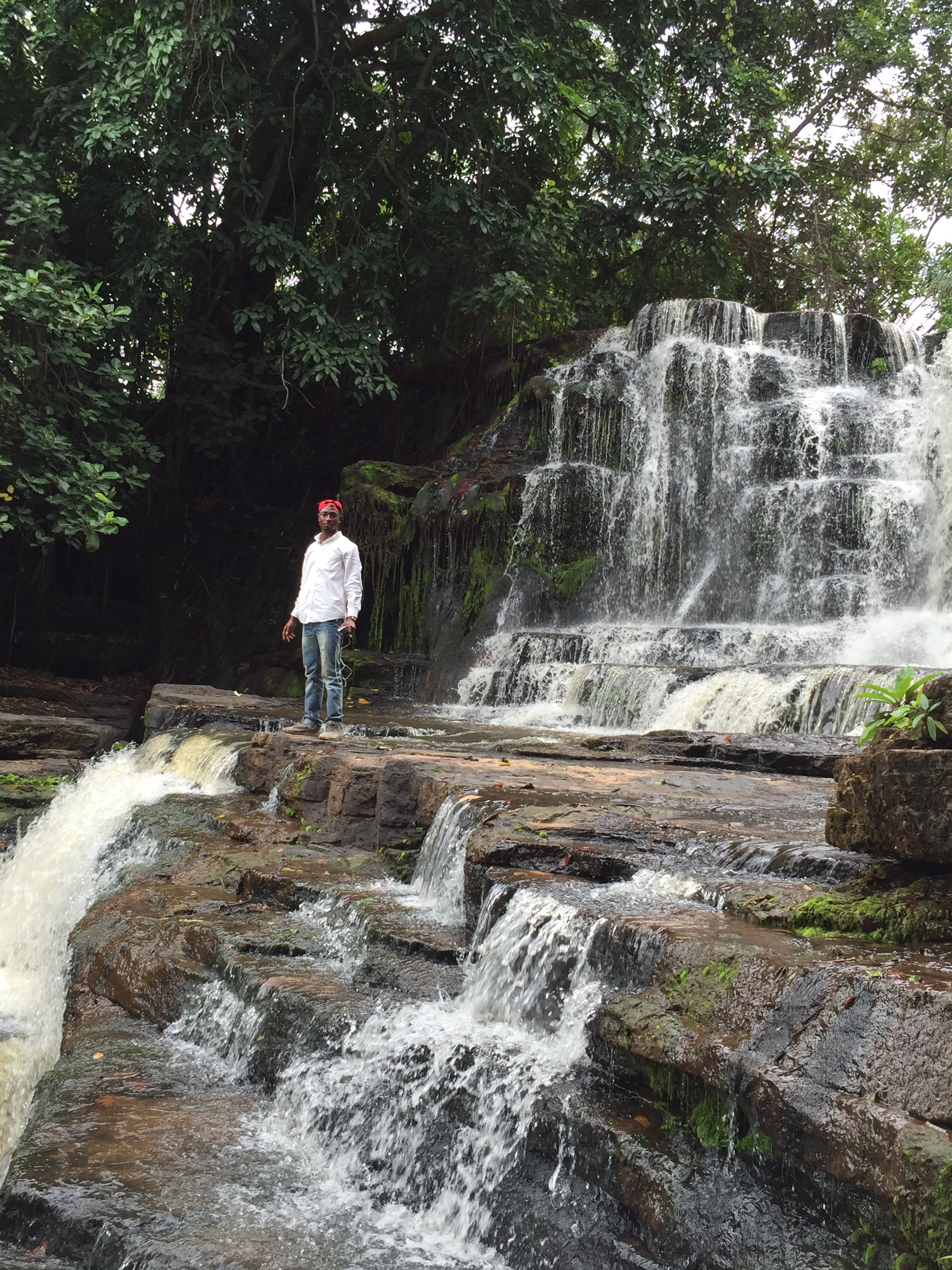
- Interactive map of Fuller Waterfalls
- Location: Kintampo, Ghana
- Coordinates: 8°04′58″N 1°47′48″W

Fuller Waterfalls are located in a town called Yabraso, 7 km West of Kintampo, Ghana. They are estimated to be 173 meters above sea level, falling gently over a series of cascades along river Oyoko at Yabraso (tributary of the Black Volta).

In 1988, Filipino missionary Rev. Fr. Joseph Panabang began using the site as a prayer ground with his congregation, naming it "Our Lady of Kintampo". In 1998 he departed from the town.

== See also ==
- Fuller Waterfalls, Ghana
