= McCarthy Appiah =

Ghanaian footballer

Personal information
- Date of birth: 4 August 1996 (age 30)
- Height: 1.79 m (5 ft 10 in)
- Position: Midfielder

Team information
- Current team: Ashanti Gold

Senior career*
Years	Team	Apps	(Gls)
2016	Asokwa Deportivo		
2017–	Ashanti Gold		

International career^{‡}
2019–	Ghana	1	(0)
- * Club domestic league appearances and goals as of 1 August 2020 ‡ National team caps and goals as of 1 August 2020

McCarthy Appiah (born 4 August 1996) is a Ghanaian football midfielder who plays for Ashanti Gold.
