= David Duncan (footballer) =

Ghanaian footballer & manager (born 1963)

Personal information
- Full name: David Duncan
- Date of birth: 25 October 1963 (age 63)
- Place of birth: Accra, Greater Accra, Ghana
- Height: 1.67 m (5 ft 6 in)
- Position: Defender

Youth career
- 1984–1986: Afienya United

Senior career*
Years	Team	Apps	(Gls)
1986–1991	Great Olympics		
1991–1992	Afienya United		
1992–1995	Great Olympics		

Managerial career
- 2000–2002: Great Olympics
- 2002–2004: Sekondi Hasaacas
- 2004–2005: Ghana U-17
- 2006–2008: Goldfields Obuasi
- 2008–2009: Free State Stars
- 2009–2011: Goldfields Obuasi
- 2011–2011: Ghana U-23
- 2012–2013: Hearts of Oak
- 2015–2016: Asante Kotoko
- * Club domestic league appearances and goals

David Duncan (born 25 October 1963) is the assistant coach of the Ghana national football team, the Black Stars.

== Club career ==
David Duncan began his club career at Afienya United in 1984 before moving to Premier Division side Great Olympics two years later. David Duncan mixed schooling with his football career but he had to take a number of years off to pursue his education. He was back with Afienya United for one season in the 1991/92 season when his team finished eighth in the league. He retired from playing in the 1994/95 season when his darling club Great Olympics finished sixth on the league log.

== Managerial career ==
=== Great Olympics ===
David Duncan started his coaching career as an assistant coach with Great Olympics in the early 2000s. In the 2002 season, he went for a short coaching course in Denmark but upon his return, J.E Sarpong who was head coach then had resigned for the second time in the season. when he was assistant to J.E Sarpong. On 17 May 2002, David Duncan was officially appointed as the head coach of Great Olympics. The young coach led Great Olympics to a respectable fourth position, and in effect bettering their previous season's finish by fourth places. David Duncan left Great Olympics at the end of the season having displayed superior style of football over the two giants of Ghana football, Accra Hearts of Oak and Asante Kotoko.

=== Sekondi Hasaacas ===
Duncan moved to giants of the West, Sekondi Hasaacas in 2003. He led the Sekondi side to an eighth place finish in his first season, one place behind his former team Great Olympics. Sekondi Hasaacas finished seventh the following season in the novelty league of the southern sector.

=== Black Starlets ===
Duncan was appointed the Coach of the Ghana U-17 in 2004. He won silver at the 2005 African Under-17 Championship in Gambia. The Black Starlets had a poor showing in the FIFA Under-17 World Cup in Peru where they were eliminated in the first round, in the midst of public disagreements with GFA administrators.

=== Ashantigold ===
Ashanti Gold S.C. came calling for Duncan in 2006. The three-time Glo Premier League champions had fallen off the radar since their consecutive title triumphs between 1993 and 1996. In two seasons, Duncan finished second back-to-back with the Obuasi team. He led Ashantigold to victory in the Macufe Cup in 2006. In the 2006–07 season, Ashantigold finished 5 points off Champions Hearts of Oak in the league with 53 points. They managed the same point total in the 2007–08 season but they lost out to Asante Kotoko.

=== Free State Stars ===
Duncan had won suitors in South Africa when he took Ashantigold to win the Macufe Cup in 2006. Free State Stars was his next destination but he was only there for three months. In that short period of time, he led Free State Stars to victory in the Phakisa Cup in 2009 beating Soweto giants Orlando Pirates and Chiefs. The Ghanaian coach left Free State Stars in August 2008 after they appointed Owen Da Gama as Technical Director of the club.

=== Ashantigold ===
He returned to Ashanti Gold in 2009. This time around, he finished second, again, with the Miners in a tight-race with Aduana Stars. The newly promoted side beat Ashanti Gold to the 2009–10 season Glo Premier League title on head-to-head rule after they both finished with 53 points on the final day of the season. Ashantigold needed a draw at Berekum Chelsea F.C. but they lost on the final 1–0 away from home. It was a case of deja vu for David Duncan's Ashgold the following season when they placed second with 53 points and lost the league title to Berekum Chelsea.

=== Black Meteors ===
Duncan took the Ghana U-23, The Black Meteors, coaching duties in 2011. He was tasked to qualify the team for the London Olympics but they were knocked out by Sudan 2–1 on aggregate in the qualifiers.

=== Accra Hearts of Oak ===
He was appointed the head coach of Hearts of Oak in the 2012–13 season. Hearts of Oak had lost three, drawn once, and won two of their opening 6 games in the league. Former Black Stars skipper C.K. Akunnor was relieved of his duties and in his place, David Duncan was appointed the new head coach.

On 18 November 2012 he led Accra Hearts of Oak to a goalless draw in Kumasi, against Asante Kotoko on his managerial debut for the Accra side. He won his first game the following week in 2–0 win over Liberty Professionals. Duncan's Hearts of Oak went seven games without a league victory – drew 4 and lost 3. The poor form pushed Hearts of Oak into the relegation mire in the latter stages of the first round of the 2012–13 Glo Premier League season.

However, results changed for the better in the second round for David Duncan's side. They amassed 35 points out of a possible 45 to finish the league season in fifth position, a point off third-placed Ebusua Dwarfs.

Duncan also got Hearts of Oak to a first semi-final appearance in the FA Cup in 13 years. They lost 2–1 to Medeama in the semi-finals of the 2012–13 MTN FA CUP.

The new Accra Hearts of Oak manager won his first trophy for the Continental Club Masters in the 2013 GHALCA President's Cup competition. He led his team, Hearts of Oak, to a 4–3 penalty win over Congolese giants TP Mazembe in the first day of the competition to progress to the finals of the President's Cup. In the finals, David Duncan's side broke the Medeama jinx by beating the fellow Premiership side 2–0 to lift the 2013 GHALCA President's Cup.

==== 2013–14 ====
Duncan started the new season with Accra Hearts of Oak on a very good note. He led his team to an away win over Edubiase United on the opening day of the season. However, he lost the second game of the season to bitter rivals Kumasi Asante Kotoko 0–1 at the Accra Sports Stadium after losing his key players, notably, Edubiase two-goal hero Emmanuel Hayford to injury, team captain Moro Abubakr to suspension, and a few others. His young side dominated the exchanges, missing countless glorious chances, but Kotoko snatched the points through a Seidu Bancey beauty in the 29th minute. Duncan's side put the disappointment of the derby defeat aside, and went on to win their next four games, beating new entrants Inter Allies 2–3, Sekondi Hasaacas 2–1, Bechem United 0–1, and Berekum Chelsea 1–0. They dropped points at the Kpando Park after taking a first half lead through Emmanuel Hayford, but Heart of Lions fought back to snatch a 1–1 draw. Hearts followed up with a 2–0 home win over Liberty Professionals. Duncan succumbed to his former side Ashgold again, losing 1–0 at the Len Clay Stadium, before his side fought back to claw a point against Kumasi King Faisal in a 1–1 drawn game at the Accra Sports Stadium. The King Faisal game was David Duncan's last game in charge of Accra Hearts of Oak. He was asked to step aside on 8 November 2013 by the club.

=== After Hearts of Oak ===
Although, Accra Hearts of Oak insisted David Duncan's departure was a mutual agreement between both parties, the fans did not believe the explanation given for his departure. They organised a peaceful demonstration, led by supporters' leaders, Barima Atuahene, Maxwell Asabere, and members of the radical Chapter O group, to reinstate David Duncan as the coach of the club. The new group, opposing the sacking of David Duncan, succeeded in moving the coach back to the residential camp of the club ahead of a big game against Amidaus Professionals. Unperturbed by the sack, David Duncan gave a rousing speech to his players, and encouraged them to fight for the supporters in the next game. Hearts went on to win the game by a solitary goal with David Duncan in attendance (to fulfill his promise to his players). David Duncan has the third best league record of any Hearts (indigen) coach in the 21st century. His record is only bettered by, the celebrated Cecil Jones Attuquayefio and Herbert Addo (2002–2003). Duncan managed 39 (league and FA Cup) competitive games for Hearts of Oak. He won 21 games, drew 11, and lost 7, with his side scoring and conceding 56 and 29 goals respectively.

Duncan petitioned the Ghana Football Association to adjudicate a case of wrongful termination of contract by Hearts of Oak. After successfully weighing both sides of the case, the Ghana Football Association authorized Hearts of Oak to pay a record $40,000 as compensation to David Duncan for wrongful dismissal. In January 2015, Duncan became head coach of Asante Kotoko on a two-year contract.

=== Kumasi Asante Kotoko ===
Duncan was appointed coach of Kumasi Asante Kotoko on a two-year deal on Wednesday 18 March 2015. Kotoko were struggling in the season having accumulated 10 points from 10 games and lying precariously on 14th position on the Ghana Premier League log. The Porcupine Warriors had underwhelmed in the opening part of the season and having lost 0–1 to rivals Accra Hearts of Oak in the fifth league game of the season, they needed a massive lift and Duncan's appointment did just that. In the next 20 games that followed, Kotoko won 11, drew 4 and lost five times. Before Duncan's appointment, the Porcupines trailed eventual league winners Ashanti Gold by 12 points. But he had bridged that gap to just two solitary points come the end of the season. Kotoko became the most improved side in the league, leaping from the 14th position to finish second on the league log. Duncan also led Kotoko to the finals of the 2015 Ghanaian FA Cup where they lost under controversial circumstances to Medeama Sporting Club. Despite the minor low, Duncan's Kotoko went on to beat league winners Ashgold in the finals of the SWAG CUP in 2015.

=== 2016 season ===
Duncan's Kotoko began the new season just like they had finished the previous by winning the GHALCA SIX - a preseason tournament for the teams that finished in the top 6 the previous season. Ashgold, Aduana Stars, Berekum Chelsea, Hearts, Kotoko and Medeama were the teams that contested for the G6 tournament. Kotoko went on to beat Aduana Stars on penalties in the finals. Duncan's players swept four out of the five categories for the G6 awards. However, his reign at Kotoko ended on 22 June 2016 following a mutual contract termination.

=== Black Stars ===
In January 2020, Duncan was appointed as the assistant coach of the Ghana national football team, the Black Stars, deputizing the previous assistant coach Charles K. Akonnor who had replaced James Kwesi Appiah. In 2020, in his capacity as the assistant coach, he attended the CAF workshop on monitoring physical fitness performance of players in Africa.

=== Coaching courses and qualifications ===
- Advanced National Diploma - USA, 2017 (equivalent to UEFA ‘A’)
- CAF License 'A' 2012
- CAF License 'B' 2011
- National Diploma - USA, 2009 (equivalent to UEFA ‘B’)
- UEFA Certificate, 2005 (As Trainer of Trainers for Youth Development - Cyprus
- Coaching Attachment: FC Copenhagen, Esberg FC - Denmark, 2002.

== Honours ==
Ghana U-17

- African U-17 Championship runner-up: 2005

Hearts of Oak

- GHALCA President's Cup: 2013

Asante Kotoko

- SWAG Cup: 2015
- GHALCA 6 Cup: 2016
- MTN FA Cup runner-up: 2015

=== Individual ===
- Ghana Coach of the Year Award: 2006
