= Charles Akonnor =

Ghanaian footballer (born 1974)

Personal information
- Full name: Charles Kwabla Akonnor
- Date of birth: 12 March 1974 (age 52)
- Place of birth: Nungua, Ghana
- Height: 1.82 m (6 ft 0 in)
- Position: Midfielder

Team information
- Current team: Gor Mahia (manager)

Youth career
- 1985–1987: Young Hearts Tema
- 1988–1990: Okwawu United

Senior career*
Years	Team	Apps	(Gls)
1990–1992	Obuasi Goldfields		
1992–1998	Fortuna Köln	153	(26)
1998–2003	VfL Wolfsburg	121	(13)
2004–2005	SpVgg Unterhaching	46	(4)
2005–2007	AC Horsens	54	(6)
2007–2008	Alki Larnaca		
2008–2009	SC Langenhagen	11	(3)
Total		384	(52)

International career
1991–1993	Ghana U20 (Note: Statistics are from FIFA World Youth Championship (remaining stats unknown))	4	(1)
1995–1996	Ghana U23 (Note: Statistics are from 1996 Olympics games (remaining stats unknown))	3	(1)
1991–2001	Ghana	51	(13)

Managerial career
- 2009–2010: Sekondi Wise Fighters
- 2010–2012: Sekondi Wise Fighters (director of sport)
- 2012: Hearts of Oak
- 2014–2017: Dreams
- 2017–2018: Ashanti Gold
- 2018–2019: Asante Kotoko
- 2019–2020: Ghana (assistant coach)
- 2020–2021: Ghana
- 2025–: Gor Mahia
- * Club domestic league appearances and goals

Charles Kwabla Akonnor (born 12 March 1974) is a Ghanaian football manager and former player who currently manages Kenyan Premier League club Gor Mahia. He previously managed the Ghana national team. A former midfielder, he spent most of his club career in Germany. He made 51 appearances for the Ghana national team scoring 13 goals.

He started his career in Ghana with a colts team Young Hearts, before joining Okwawu United and later Obuasi Goldfields. In 1992, Akonnor moved to Germany with Samuel Kuffour and joined then 2. Bundesliga side Fortuna Köln, where he would spend six seasons and appear in over 150 matches and score over 25 goals before securing a move to Bundesliga side VfL Wolfsburg where he made his name. At Wolfsburg, Akonnor played over 140 matches, scored over 20 goals and served as captain in the 2001–02 season before leaving the club in 2004 to join SpVgg Unterhaching.

At the international level, he was capped for Ghana at the U20, U23 and the senior team. At the youth level, he starred for Ghana and helped them to third place during the 1991 African Youth Championship and second place during the 1993 FIFA World Youth Championship. At the senior level he made 51 appearances and scored 13 goals for Ghana between 1991 and 2001 and captained the team from 1998 to 2001. Akonnor also represented Ghana at the 1996 Summer Olympics and in four Africa Cup of Nations in 1994, 1996, 1998 and 2000, serving as captain in 2000. In 1998, he was also named in the CAF XI of the year and AFCON Team of the Tournament.

== Early life ==
Akonnor was born and bred in Nungua, a suburb of Accra but hails from Ningo Prampram in the Greater Accra Region of Ghana making him a Ga-Adangbe. He had his basic and junior high school education at Nungua Primary School/JHS and later proceeded to the Nungua Presbyterian Secondary and Commercial School for his secondary school education. Whilst in school, he played football and was an integral member of the school's football team whilst representing the school in juvenile championships and other inter-school games.

== Club career ==
Akonnor started his career with colts club Young Hearts located in Tema in 1985. He was scouted by former Ghana Premier League side Okwawu United, signing for the team in 1988. He played there till 1990 when he secured a deal to join Obuasi Goldfields.

=== Fortuna Köln ===
Akonnor first came to Germany in 1992, along with friend and national teammate Samuel Kuffour. He joined Fortuna Köln in 1992 upon his arrival. He played for the side for six years, playing 159 matches in all competitions (153 league matches) and scoring 26 goals all in league matches, averaging a minimum of 26 matches per season.

=== VfL Wolfsburg ===
Having played for six years with Fortuna Köln (all in the second division), he switched in 1998 to Bundesliga side VfL Wolfsburg. He made his competitive debut for the club on 15 August 1998, playing the full 90 minutes in a 1–0 league loss to Bayern Munich. On 28 August 1998, Akonnor scored his competitive debut goal, by scoring the winning goal in the 88th minute of a 4–3 DFB-Pokal victory against Karlsruher SC. On 19 September 1998, he scored his debut league goal in a 4–2 loss to Werder Bremen.

At Wolfsburg, Akonnor quickly developed as a resourceful player and one of the team's most important elements and, in 2001–02, was given team captaincy. However, at the start of the following season he was injured (a knee problem which required an operation in 2003) causing him to miss a greater part of the season. He left the club in January 2004 after five seasons, playing 140 matches in all competitions (121 league matches) and scoring 23 goals (13 in league matches), averaging 28 league matches per season.

=== SpVgg Unterhaching ===
His initial injury whilst at Wolfsburg, prompted a January 2004 move to SpVgg Unterhaching, a return to the 2. Bundesliga. He made his debut for the club on 31 January in their 3–1 victory over Greuther Fürth. On 5 April 2004, he scored his debut goal, by scoring Unterhaching's only goal in a 3–1 loss to Rot-Weiß Oberhausen. Akonnor immediately became an important player in their team with his experience from playing in the Bundesliga, featuring in 15 of the 17 league matches in the second round of the 2003–04 season.

The following season, he played 31 matches, missing only 3 matches and scored three goals. One of his goals, came in the league match against Erzgebirge Aue, which he scored the second goal to help SpVgg Unterhaching to a comfortable 4–1 victory. At the end of his two-year spell, he had played in 48 matches in all competitions (46 league matches) and scored 4 goals.

=== Later years ===
In 2005, Akonnor moved to Denmark to play with AC Horsens, playing an important part in the team's consolidation in the Danish Superliga, where they had just arrived in the previous season. He played one final season in Cyprus' top flight, with Alki Larnaca.

In Summer 2008 left Cyprus and moved to Germany-based club SC Langenhagen in the Oberliga Niedersachenliga-West on a one-year contract. He played there until 18 February 2009 when he announced the end of his career.

== International career ==
At the international level, he capped for Ghana at the under-20 level, U23 and the senior team. At the youth level, he starred for Ghana, and helped them third place during the 1991 African Youth Championship but unfortunately losing out on qualifying for the World Youth Championship. Two years later the team returned and this time won 1993 African Youth Championship and qualified for the World Youth Championship. The team went on and placed second at the 1993 FIFA World Youth Championship, losing to Brazil by 2–1 in the final after Emmanuel Duah had put Ghana ahead in the first half. In the team's route to the final, he scored a goal in their final group stage match against Portugal to help them to a 2–0 victory and qualify for the quarter-finals. Akonnor along with players from that squad like Samuel Osei Kuffour, Mohamed Gargo, Augustine Arhinful, Emmanuel Duah and Stephen Baidoo would later graduate into the senior team to become the core members.

In July 1996, he was part and served as captain of the 1996 Ghana Olympic squad at the 1996 Summer Olympics. The team finished in second place in Group C, but later lost and exit the competition in the quarter-finals after losing Brazil, a match which Akonnor scored the initial equalizer to grant Ghana a 1–1 before half time but lost by 4–2 at the end through a brace from Ronaldo and a goal from Bebeto.

For the senior team Akonnor would go on and make 51 international caps and later was named captain of the Black Stars following Abedi Pele's retirement. However, he would never be recalled again after applying for (and receiving) German citizenship.

== Coaching career ==
=== Sekondi Wise Fighters ===
On 19 February 2009, Akunnor signed a contract as head coach for Sekondi Wise Fighters where he worked with his former national teammate Nii Lamptey as his assistant. On 22 January 2010, he was named as the director of sport of the Sekondi Wise Fighters. His successor as head coach was Hans-Dieter Schmidt.

=== Accra Hearts of Oak ===
On 19 March 2012, Akonnor was named as head coach of the Glo Premier League club Hearts of Oak succeeding Nebojša Vučićević. In November 2012, he was sacked after a poor start of the season with the club picking four points of a possible 15 with losses in their last three games to Ebusua Dwarfs, Wa All Stars and Berekum Chelsea.

=== Dreams ===
In 2014, Akonnor was appointed as the head coach of then Ghana Division One League side Dreams. The following year, he led the team to the Ghana Premier League for the time in the club's history after winning the 2015 Ghana Division One League Zone III getting promoted to compete in the 2016 Ghana Premier League season. In their debut GPL season, he led to ninth-place finish. The club was however demoted by the Ghana Football Association's Disciplinary Committee to the Ghana Division One League in December 2016 due to an anomaly with the registration of a player. He left the club permanently in November 2017 following his short-term contract with Ashanti Gold. He subsequently signed a permanent deal with Ashanti Gold.

=== Ashanti Gold ===
In April 2017, Akonnor returned to his boyhood club Ashanti Gold, to serve as head coach for the second round of the 2017 Ghana Premier League, after the club had been trailing at the bottom of the league table with eight points after eleven games out of which they had won two, drawn two and recorded seven losses. His contract with the club was on an interim basis as he was still under contract with Dreams. He led the team to escape relegation by winning ten matches, drawing three and losing six out of nineteen matches in process accumulating 33 points to finish the league season in 12th place with 41 points overall. He returned to the club in December 2017 on a permanent basis after departing Dreams on mutual terms.

During the 2018 Ghanaian Premier League, he led the team to 2nd place on the league table before the league was cancelled in June 2018 by the government of Ghana's directive following the Number 12 Expose corruption scandal within Ghana Football Association. Within the season, he was adjudged the GPL NASCO Coach of March after leading Ashanti Gold to three wins and one draw in four matches within the month. On 29 June 2018, he was sacked by the team, three days after he was suspended for failing to turn up for the club's training.

=== Asante Kotoko ===
On 1 October 2018, he was appointed as the head coach of Asante Kotoko replacing Paa Kwesi Fabin. He signed a two-year contract with the club running through until October 2020. He served for nine months, helping them to win the 2019 GFA Normalization Committee Special Competition and qualify for the 2019–20 CAF Champions League. In July 2019, he was sacked by Asante Kotoko and replaced by Kjetil Zachariassen.

=== Ghana National Team ===
In September 2019, he was shortlisted for the head coach of the Guinea national team role but French national Didier Six was given the position. On 30 October 2019, he was appointed as the assistant coach of the Ghana national team, serving as deputy to James Kwesi Appiah. In early January 2020, his appointment as assistant coach of the Ghana national team was terminated. This happened as a result of the Ghana Football Association's decision to dissolve the technical crews of the senior teams. However, he was appointed as the head coach of Ghana on 15 January 2020. David Duncan was appointed as his assistant.

Ahead of Africa Cup of Nations (AFCON) qualifiers against South Africa and São Tomé and Príncipe, he choose to summon 32 locally based players for an intensive training regimen. He revealed that the global COVID-19 pandemic necessitated his decision to name 32 home-based players for the AFCON qualifiers because some of the players invited for the previous matches had tested positive after returning to their clubs.

On 13 September 2021, the Ghana Football Association announced that Akonnor along with his two assistants, David Duncan and Patrick Greveraars had been sacked after their contracts had been terminated, following an unconvincing win against Ethiopia and defeat to South Africa in a World Cup qualifying match.

== Personal life ==
His son Charles Jesaja Herrmann is also a footballer who plays as a forward; he came through the youth system at VfL Wolfsburg.

== Managerial statistics ==
As of 13 September 2021

Team	From	To	Record				
Team	From	To	G	W	D	L	Win %
Accra Hearts of Oak	19 March 2012	1 November 2012	5	1	1	3	20%
Ashanti Gold	1 April 2017	29 June 2018	15	8	3	4	53.3%
Asante Kotoko	1 October 2018	6 July 2019	22	11	6	5	50%
Ghana	15 January 2020	13 September 2021	10	4	2	4	40%
Total			52	24	12	16	46.2%

== Honours ==
=== Player ===
Ghana

- African Youth Championship: 1993, third place: 1991
- FIFA U-20 World Cup runner up: 1993

=== Manager ===
Dreams

- Ghana Division One League Zone III: 2015

Asante Kotoko

- GFA Normalization Committee Special Competition: 2019

Gor Mahia

- Kenyan Premier League: 2025–26

Individual

- Ghana Premier League Coach of the Month: March 2018
- Ghana Football Awards Manager of the Year: 2019
- Kenyan Premier League Coach of the Month: October 2025, January 2026, October 2026
- Kenyan Premier League Coach of the Season: 2025–26
- AFCON Team of the Tournament & CAF African 11 Team of the Year: 1998
