= Amos Addai =

Ghanaian professional footballer

Amos Addai (born 10 November 1995) is a Ghanaian professional footballer who plays as a midfielder and captains Ghanaian Premier League side Ashanti Gold.

== Career ==
=== Ashanti Gold ===
Simpson started his career with the youth side of Ashanti Gold. He was named on the match day squad on the bench for the senior team during the 2013–14 Ghanaian Premier League season. He grew through the ranks and was promoted fully to the senior team by the then coach of the side Bashir Hayford in 2015. He was a member of the club's winning squad for the 2015 Ghanaian Premier League season. He became a key member of the club from 2016 Ghanaian Premier League season.

=== FK Nizhny Novgorod ===
In January 2019, he signed a short-term contract with Russian Second Division side FC Nizhny Novgorod. The terms of contract and duration were undisclosed, though he subsequently stayed with the club for 3 months and returned to his previous club in April 2019.

=== Return to Ashanti Gold ===
Addai returned to Ashanti Gold in April 2019 after a short stint with Russian club FC Nizhny Novgorod. He served as deputy captain to striker, Shafiu Mumuni. Following his departure he was promoted to captain of the side. He captained the side and was a key member of the squad during the 2020–21 CAF Confederation Cup.

== Honours ==
Ashanti Gold

- Ghana Premier League: 2014–15
