= Frank Akoto =

Ghanaian footballer (born 1997)

Personal information
- Full name: Frank Akoto
- Date of birth: 17 November 1997 (age 28)
- Place of birth: Ghana
- Height: 1.81 m (5 ft 11 in)
- Position: Centre-back

Team information
- Current team: One Taguig
- Number: 3

Youth career
- Fantomas FC

Senior career*
Years	Team	Apps	(Gls)
2012–2019	Heart of Lions		
2019–2022	Ashanti Gold	50	(3)
2023–2025	Legon Cities	55	(3)
2026–	One Taguig	7	(4)

International career
2019	Ghana U23		
- * Club domestic league appearances and goals as of 4:32, 4 March 2026 (UTC)

Frank Akoto (born 17 November 1997) is a Ghanaian professional footballer who plays as a centre-back for Philippines Football League club One Taguig.

== Career ==
=== Youth career ===
Akoto played youth football in Ghana for Fantomas FC, and also had a short spell playing in the United Arab Emirates. At just 15 years old, he signed with Heart of Lions, serving the club for seven seasons and becoming its captain.

=== Ashanti Gold ===
In 2019, Akoto moved from Hearts of Lions to Ashanti Gold in the Ghana Premier League. After a few seasons at the club, he was part of a controversy after he and several other players were accused of match fixing in a game against Inter Allies. In 2022, the Ghana Football Association hit the club with automatic relegation, suspending Akoto and several players for two years. A year later, however, the case was overturned and his suspension was lifted.

Looking to get back into football, Akoto signed with Legon Cities, becoming one of the club's most reliable defenders. However, Akoto departed the club in 2025 after the club were relegated at the end of the 2024–25 season.

=== One Taguig ===
Akoto signed for One Taguig of the Philippines Football League in 2025, playing alongside former Ashanti Gold teammate Isaac Opoku Agyemang. He made his debut in a win against Kaya–Iloilo, scoring a header to win the game. In the first seven games of the season, he scored four goals.

== International career ==
=== Ghana U23 ===
While serving as captain of Hearts of Lions, Akoto was called up to the Ghana under-23 national team as part of a local training camp before the 2019 Africa U23 Cup of Nations. He scored in a friendly, but narrowly missed out on the final squad.
