= Kofi Mensah (footballer, born 1996) =

Ghanaian professional footballer

Kofi Mensah (born 26 December 1996) is a Ghanaian professional footballer who plays as goalkeeper for Ashanti Gold on loan from Karela United. Mensah previously played for Ghanaian club Tema Youth, Cape Coast Ebusua Dwarfs and Karela United He also featured for Zambian club Power Dynamos.

== Career ==
Mensah played for Karela United, where he helped them to win the Ghana Division One League Zone III in 2017 and gain promotion to the Ghana Premier League for the first time in the club's history. He also played a major part in their 2019 GFA Normalization Special Competition campaign as they went to through to the final before losing to Asante Kotoko in the Championship playoff final.

Mensah played for Zambia Super League club Power Dynamos from January 2020 to February 2021. In February 2021, he signed a three-year deal with Obuasi-based club Ashanti Gold.

== Honours ==
Karela United

- Ghana Division One League Zone II: 2017
