= George Owu =

Ghanaian former professional footballer (born 1982)

Personal information
- Full name: George Owu
- Date of birth: 7 July 1982 (age 44)
- Place of birth: Accra, Ghana
- Height: 1.88 m (6 ft 2 in)
- Position: Goalkeeper

Senior career*
Years	Team	Apps	(Gls)
2000–2001	Sekondi Hasaacas		
2002–2004	Asante Kotoko		
2005–2007	Ashanti Gold		
2007–2010	Al-Masry		
2010–2013	Ebusua Dwarfs		
2013–2016	Sekondi Hasaacas		
2017–2018	Ashanti Gold	25	(0)

International career
2004	Ghana U-23	3	(0)
2003–2009	Ghana	10	(0)
- * Club domestic league appearances and goals

George Owu (born 7 July 1982) is a Ghanaian former professional footballer who played as a goalkeeper.

== Club career ==
Owu was born in Accra. He signed for Egyptian Premier League side Al-Masry. He moved from Ashanti Gold. His performances earned him a trial with Premier League side Tottenham Hotspur but was not offered a contract.

He returned to his homeland Ghana and signed for Cape Coast Ebusua Dwarfs in October 2010. In December 2012, it was confirmed that Owu rejoined his first professional club Sekondi Hasaacas on a one-year deal.

He helped Ashanti Gold avoid relegation in the 2017 season.

== International career ==
Owu was part of the Ghanaian 2004 Olympic football team, who exited in the first round, having finished in third place in group B. He played his first game for the Ghana national team on 19 November 2003 and was the second goalkeeper at the 2006 Africa Cup of Nations in Egypt 2006.

With both Sammy Adjei and Philemon McCarthy injured, Owu played in a qualification match for the 2006 FIFA World Cup against South Africa. He kept a clean sheet helping Ghana secure a 2–0 away win. He was also the second goalkeeper for the Germany. He was the goalkeeper for the 2008 Africa Cup of Nations hosted in Ghana.

== Honours ==
- FIFA World Youth Championship runner-up: 2001
