= Gyandu Park =

Sports venue in Sekondi-Takoradi, Ghana

Coordinates: 4.9166667°N 1.7666667°W

- Interactive map of Gyandu Park
- Location: Sekondi-Takoradi, Western Region, Ghana
- Capacity: 15,000

Tenants
- Sekondi Hasaacas FC; Medeama SC; Hasaacas Ladies F.C.

Gyandu Park is a multi-use stadium in Sekondi-Takoradi, Ghana. The stadium holds 15,000 spectators. It was renovated in 2008 and served as a training pitch for the African Cup teams in Group B.

== Stadium usage ==
The stadium is used mostly for football matches and many other sporting events.

== Residence ==
The stadium used to be the home grounds of Sekondi Hasaacas FC and Sekondi Eleven Wise, and was sometimes used by Medeama SC of the Ghana Premier League Mediama has moved to the Tarkwa TNA park whiles Hasaacas has also moved to the Essipon Stadium. Gyandu Park hosts most of the second division games involving Eleven Wise. Most of the inter school's soccer matches are also played there.
