= Kintampo United =

Ghanaian football club

- Full name: Kintampo United
- Ground: Bono East Region, Ghana
- League: Division One League Zone 1B

Kintampo United is a Ghanaian professional football team based in the Bono East Region that plays in the 1B Zone of the Ghana Division One League. Zone 1A has seven competing teams from the part of the Ashanti Region, Bono Region, Ahafo Region and the three Northern Regions of Ghana.
