= Isaac Opoku Agyemang =

Ghanaian professional footballer

Personal information
- Full name: Isaac Opoku Agyemang
- Date of birth: 19 July 1999 (age 27)
- Place of birth: Tamale, ghana
- Height: 1.90 m (6 ft 3 in)
- Position: Forward

Team information
- Current team: One Taguig
- Number: 71

Youth career
- –2019: Lizbeth FC
- 2017–2018: → Tema Youth (loan)
- 2018–2019: → Ashanti Gold (loan)

Senior career*
Years	Team	Apps	(Gls)
2019–2023	Ashanti Gold	39	(7)
2021	→ Partizan (loan)	0	(0)
2023–2024	Samartex	9	(1)
2024–2025	East End Lions		
2025	Vision	13	(1)
2025–	One Taguig	12	(5)
- * Club domestic league appearances and goals as of 11 March 2026

Isaac Opoku Agyemang (born 19 July 1999) is a Ghanaian professional footballer who plays as a forward for One Taguig of the Philippines Football League. He previously played for Ghanaian side Ashanti Gold where he scored a brace on his Ghana Premier League debut in 2020.

== Career ==
=== Early career ===
Agyemang started his career with lower-tier side Lizbeth FC. He joined in 2018 the youth team of Ashanti Gold on loan. He also had a short stint with Tema Youth in the process.

=== Ashanti Gold ===
On 16 July 2019, Ashanti Gold announced that they had signed him on a five-year deal, becoming the club's second signing of the season with right back Kwadwo Amoako being the first also joining the club from Techiman-based club Eleven Wonders and youngster Razak Simpson also joining. On 16 December 2020, Agyemang scored two goals and made an assist on his debut against King Faisal Babies. In the absence of Hans Kwofie and Dacosta Boadu he was handed his very first start in the Gold and Black shirt by Milovan Ćirković. The match ended in a 5–1, with a brace also from Yaw Annor and a goal from David Abagna. At the end of the match, he was awarded the man of the match.
