= Kintampo North Municipal District =

Municipal District in Bono East Region, Ghana

- Municipal District
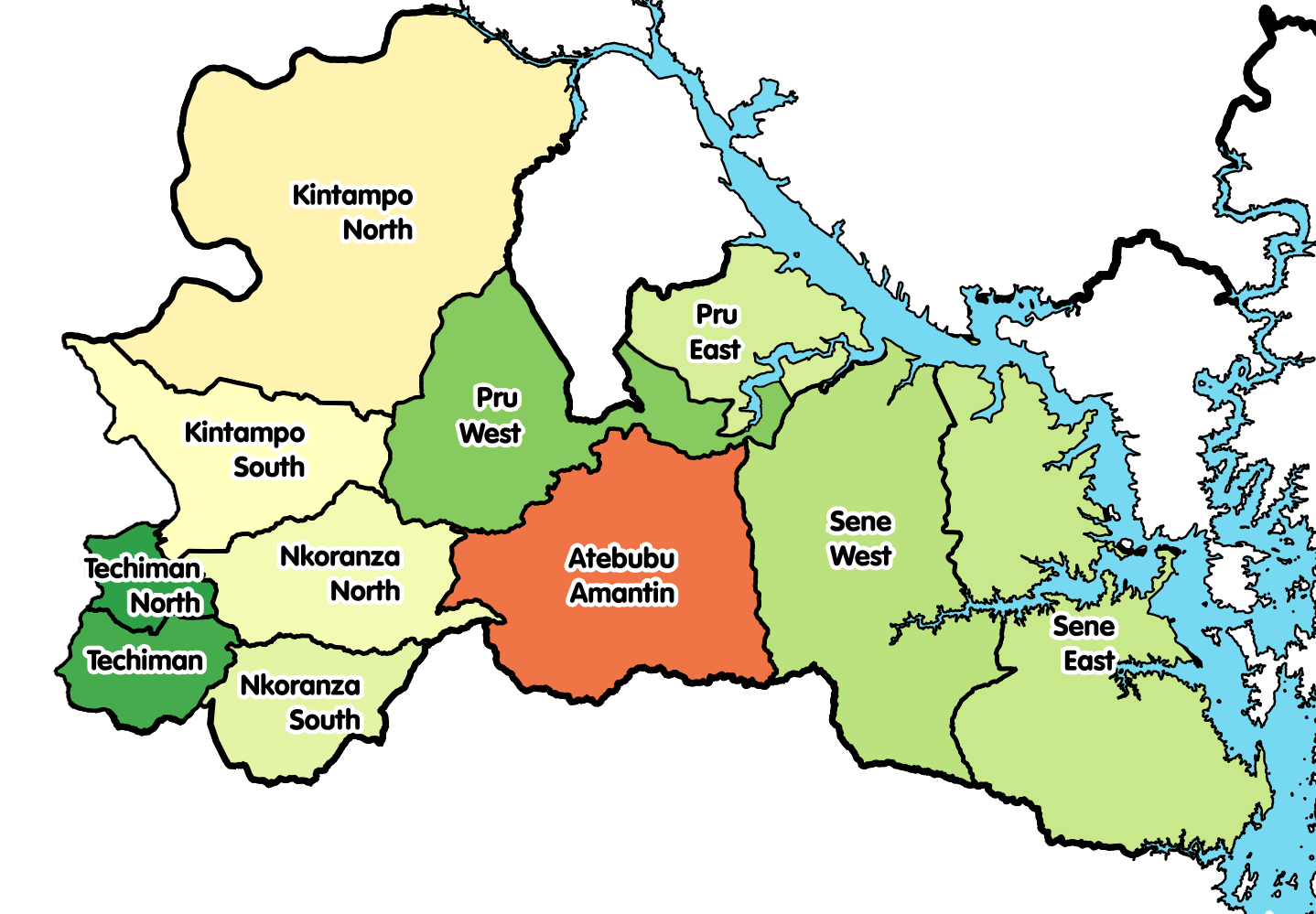
- Districts of Bono East Region

- Location of Kintampo North Municipal District within Bono East Region
- Coordinates: 8°03′12″N 01°43′37″W
- Country: Ghana
- Region: Bono East Region
- Capital: Kintampo

Government
  - Municipal Chief Executive: Isaac Baffoe Ameyaw

Area
  - Total: 5,108 km^{2} (1,972 sq mi)

Population (2021)
  - Total: 139,508
- Time zone: UTC+0 (GMT)

Kintampo North Municipal District is one of the eleven districts in Bono East Region, Ghana. Originally it was formerly part of the then-larger Kintampo District on 10 March 1989, until the southern part of the district was split off to create Kintampo South District on 12 November 2003 (effectively 17 February 2004); thus the remaining part has been renamed as Kintampo North District, which it was later elevated to municipal district assembly status on 1 November 2007 (effectively 29 February 2008) to become Kintampo North Municipal District. The municipality is located in the northern part of Bono East Region and has Kintampo as its capital town. As at 2021, Isaac Baffoe Ameyaw was the Municipal Chief Executive of the Assembly after he was nominated by Nana Akuffo-Addo.

== List of settlements ==
Settlements of Kintampo North Municipal District
| No. | Settlement | Population | Population year |
| 1 | Babatokuma | | |
| 2 | Busuama | | |
| 3 | Dawadawa No 1 & No 2 | | |
| 4 | Gulumpe | | |
| 5 | Kadelso | | |
| 6 | Kawampe | | |
| 7 | Kintampo | 47,185 | 2012 |
| 8 | Kunsu | | |
| 9 | New Longoro (Mentukwa) | | |
| 10 | Portor | | |
