= Windy Professionals FC =

Windy Professionals
- Full name: Windy Professionals
- Ground: Ghana
- League: Division One League Zone 2B

Windy Professionals is a Ghanaian football team that plays in the Ghana Division One League. The team is based in Winneba in the Central Region of Ghana.

Windy Professionals were previously known as C.K. Gyamfi Academy.
