= Kintampo District =

- Former District
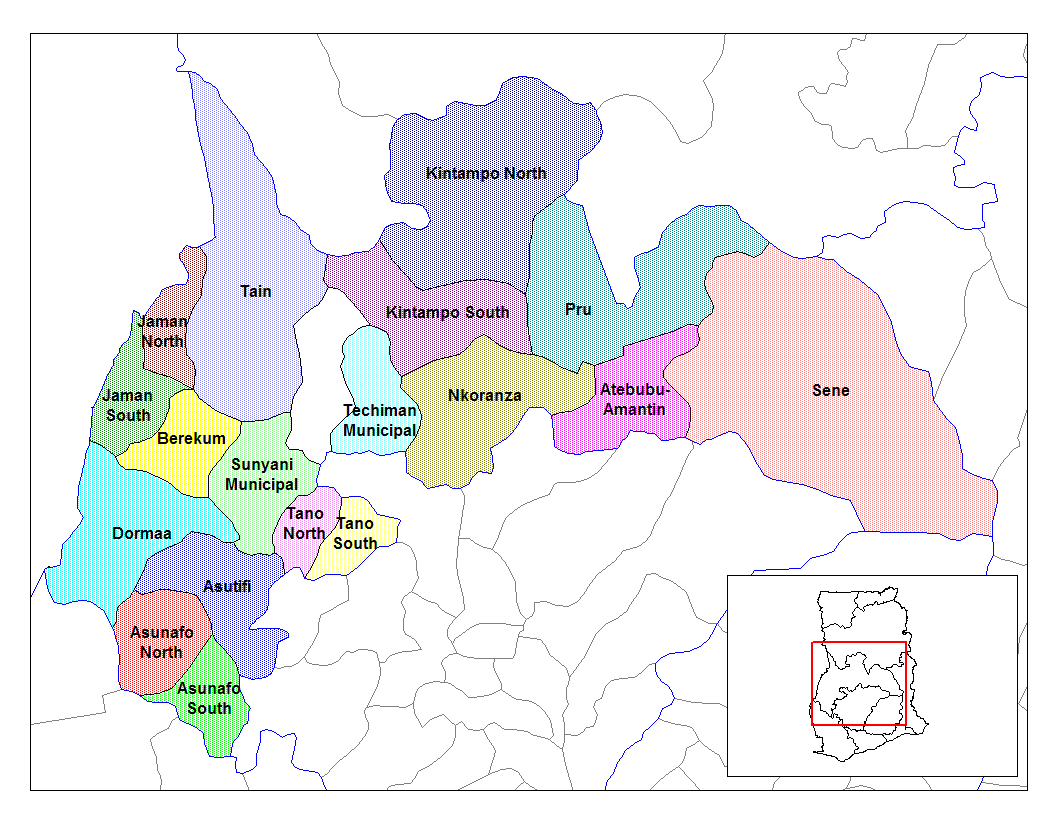
- Districts of Brong-Ahafo Region

- Location of Kintampo District within Brong-Ahafo
- Coordinates: 8°3′8″N 1°44′5″W
- Country: Ghana
- Region: Brong-Ahafo
- Capital: Kintampo

Area
  - Total: 6,566 km^{2} (2,535 sq mi)

Population (2012)
  - Total: —
- Time zone: UTC+0 (GMT)

Kintampo District is a former district that was located in Brong-Ahafo Region (now currently in Bono East Region), Ghana. Originally created as an ordinary district assembly on 10 March 1989. However on 12 November 2003 (effectively 17 February 2004), it was split off into two new districts: Kintampo North District (which it was elevated to municipal district assembly status on 1 November 2007 (effectively 29 February 2008); capital: Kintampo) and Kintampo South District (capital: Jema). The district assembly was located in the southern part of Brong-Ahafo Region (now western part of Bono East Region) and had Kintampo as its capital town.

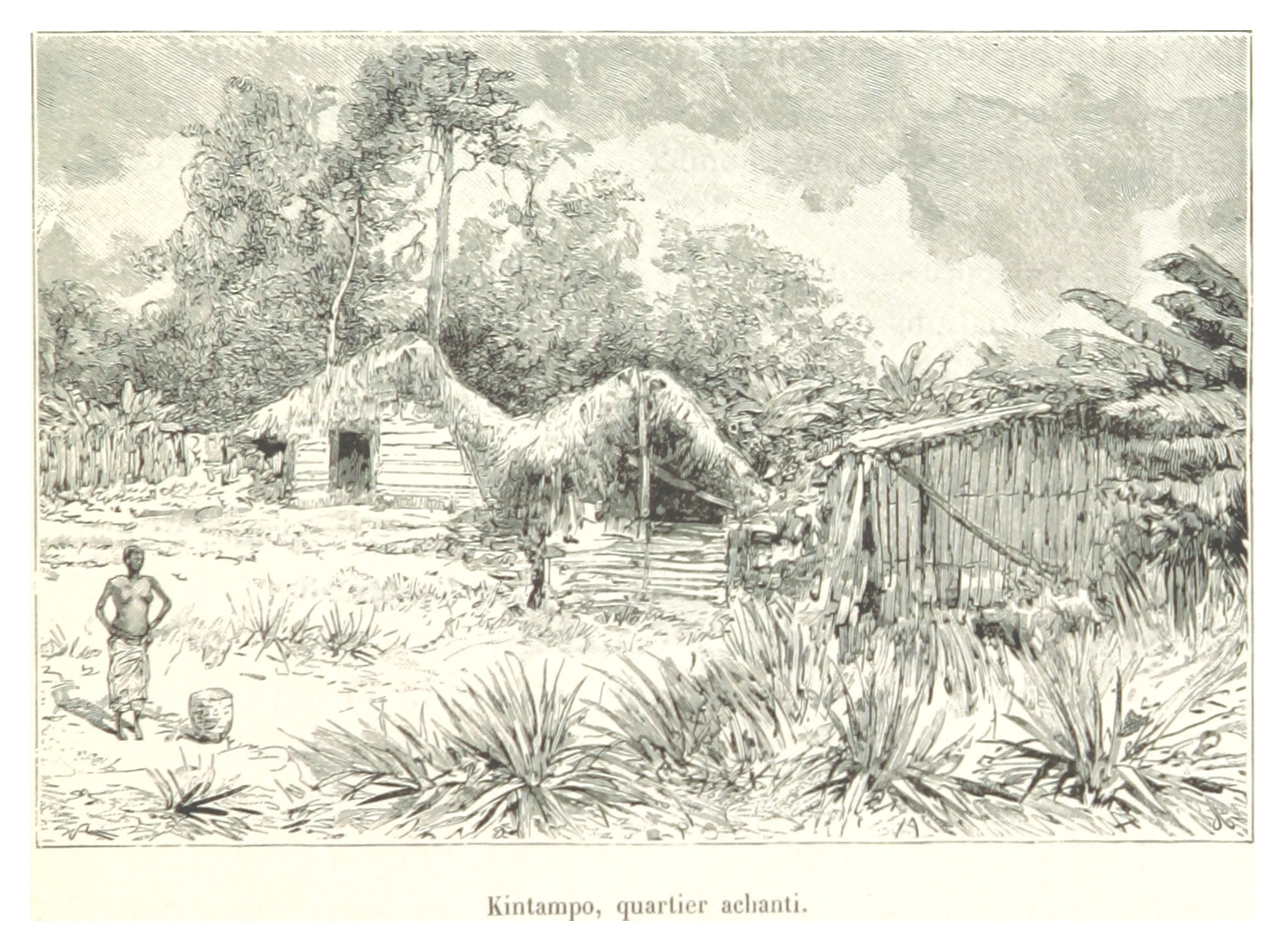
Bono quarter, Kintampo, in 1892

== Sources ==
- "Kintampo District". Statoids.
- District: Kintampo District
- 19 New Districts Created , November 20, 2003.
