= Kwadwo Amoako =

Ghanaian footballer

Kwadwo Amoako (born 12 December 1998) is a Ghanaian professional footballer who plays as defender for Ghanaian Premier League side Ashanti Gold S.C.

== Club career ==
Amoako started his career with Techiman Eleven Wonders FC, he played for the club in the 2019 GFA Normalization Committee Special Competition. He moved to Ashanti Gold in 2019, ahead of the 2019–20 Ghana Premier League season.

== International career ==
In November 2020, Amoako got his first call up to the Ghana national football team for the 2021 Africa Cup of Nations qualifications double header match against the Sudan national football team.
