= Ashanti Gold S.C. =

Association football club in Obuasi

AshantiGold
- Full name: Ashanti Gold Sporting Club
- Nicknames: AshGold, Miners
- Founded: 1978; 48 years ago
- Ground: Len Clay Stadium, Obuasi
- Capacity: 30,000
- Owner: Kwaku Frimpong
- Chairman: Champion Divine
- Manager: Milovan Cirkovic
- League: Ghana Premier League
Home colours	Away colours

Ashanti Gold Sporting Club popularly known as AshGold is a Ghanaian football team based in the gold mining town of Obuasi, south of Kumasi, the capital of Ashanti Region.

== History ==
Ashanti Gold SC was founded in 1978 by a group of employees of the Ashanti Goldfields Corporation under the name of Goldfields Sporting Club famously known as Obuasi Goldfields. The employees pleaded with management of AGC to sponsor the team, but they were always refused. The employees continued to pay the salaries and costs for the team and in the 1984 season the club finished as runner-up in the FA Cup. The management took notice and, through their leading shareholder Lonrho, arranged funding and sent an English manager to help the fledgling team. Still, no senior management was brought in to run the club. Because of their success in the FA cup, the team was promoted to Ghana Premier League the most elite football division. For almost a decade the team struggled due to disorganization, until 1993 when a company official at AGC revamped the club and brought in another English manager. 2004 Obuasi Goldfields Sporting Club Ltd. were renamed AshantiGold Sporting Club Ltd. on April 16 due to AshantiGold Sporting Club's former owners Ashanti Goldfields Corporation.

=== Years of success ===
That next season, AshGold finished third in the division after only Ashanti powerhouses Asante Kotoko. The next year a 13-man Board of Directors was established and AshGold won the league. Over the next two years, AshGold won the league again.

=== Pan-African Cups ===
The AshGold has competed in four competitions representing Ashanti. In 1995 they reached the quarter-finals in the African Champions League and in 1996 only into the final 16. In 1997 they were the runners up of the African Champions League.

=== Recent years ===
Ashanti Gold SC have remained a top team in the First Capital Plus Bank Premier League. They continue to produce footballers who have played throughout Europe. AshGold goalkeeper George Owu, joined the Black Stars in their quest for the FIFA 2006 World Cup, but did not appear in a game.

“Ashantigold SC will be demoted to Division Two League after being found guilty of match manipulation in their fixture against Inter Allies FC,” read part of the statement released by Ghana FA. “The decision takes effect from the 2022-23 league season. Officials of the club and players, who participated in the above-mentioned match have also been sanctioned by the disciplinary committee.” There were several reports within the local and international football space that the matchday 34 fixture at the Obuasi Len Clay Stadium on July 17, 2021, which Ashantigold won 7–0, had been fixed to fulfil a correct score of five goals to one in their favour. The committee further explained the sanctions meted on Ashantigold: “That at the end of the 2021-22 Ghana Premier League season, Ashantigold shall be demoted to the Division Two League in accordance with Article 6(3)(h) of the GFA Disciplinary Code 2019.

== Grounds ==
Ashanti Gold play their home matches at Len Clay Stadium.

== Honours ==
=== Official trophies (recognized by CAF and FIFA) ===
==== National ====
- Ghana Premier League: 4
  - 1993–94, 1994–95, 1995–96, 2015
- MTN FA Cup: 1
  - 1992–93
  - Runners-up: 1984, 2011–12

==== Continental ====
- CAF Champions League
  - Runners-up: 1997

==== Other trophies ====
- Ghana Telecom Gala: 1
  - 1995–96

== Performance in CAF competitions ==
- CAF Champions League: 4 appearances

1997 – Finalist
2007 – First Round
2008 – First Round
2016 Preliminary round

- African Cup of Champions Clubs: 2 appearance

1995 – Quarter-finals
1996 – Second Round

- CAF Confederation Cup: 2 appearances

2011 – First Round
2019 — First Round

- CAF Cup: 2 appearances

2001 – Quarter-finals
2002 – First Round

== Current squad ==
Note: Flags indicate national team as defined under FIFA eligibility rules; some limited exceptions apply. Players may hold more than one non-FIFA nationality.

No.	Pos.	Nation	Player
3	DF	GHA	Ibrahim Samed
4	MF	GHA	Stephen Owusu Banahene
6	DF	GHA	Dacosta Ampem
7	MF	GHA	John Josiah Andoh
9	FW	GHA	Abdul Salam
11	MF	GHA	Yaw Annor
12	MF	GHA	Elijah Addai
15	DF	GHA	Frank Akoto
16	GK	GHA	Dennis Votere
17	MF	GHA	McCarthy Appiah
18	MF	GHA	Joseph Amoah
19	FW	GHA	Isaac Opoku Agyemang
20	DF	GHA	Kwadwo Amoako
21	MF	GHA	Joseph Bempah

No.	Pos.	Nation	Player
23	MF	GHA	Eric Esso
24	MF	GHA	Amos Kofi Nkrumah
25	MF	GHA	Eric Esso
26	DF	GHA	Ali Mohammed
28	FW	GHA	Mark Agyekum
29	MF	GHA	Dauda Seidu
30	FW	GHA	Daniel Koomson
31	MF	GHA	Matthew Agama
33	FW	GHA	Seth Osei
36	MF	GHA	Emmanuel Bonsu
37	FW	GHA	Brokelyn Gordon
38	MF	GHA	Paul Asare
39	MF	GHA	Stephen Nyarko
40	GK	GHA	Kofi Mensah

As of December 2020

== Former notable players ==
- Abubakar Yakubu
- Jonathan Mensah
- Mubarak Wakaso

== Former coaches ==
- (Brazil) Paulistinha - Oswaldo Sampaio Júnior - former player of Botafogo FC in the 1960s.
- (Ghana) Mohammed Gargo
- (Serbia) Momčilo "Momo" Medić
- (Ghana) Cecil Jones Attuquayefio (1990–93)
- (England) Dave Booth (1991–94)
- (Ghana) Charles Gyamfi (1992–93)
- (Ghana) Cecil Jones Attuquayefio (1993–95)
- (Netherlands) Hans van der Pluijm (July 1, 2000 – June 30, 2002), (July 1, 2004 – Oct 5, 2005)
- (Ghana) Sam Arday (Oct 31, 2004 – May 31, 2005)
- (Ghana) David Duncan (July 1, 2005 – June 30, 2008)
- (Croatia) Zdravko Logarušić (July 1, 2010 – Dec 15, 2011)
- (Ghana) Joachim Yaw Acheampong (Dec 15, 2011 – Dec 18, 2012)
- (Iran) Mehdi Pashazadeh (Feb 13, 2012–2013)
- (Ghana) Bashir Hayford (Jan 1, 2013 – 2017)
- (Ghana) Charles Akonnor (Jan 2017 – July 2018)
- (Serbia) Milovan Cirkovic (November 2020– February 2021)

== Farm team ==
Royal Knight F.C. is a Division Two League football club based in Nsawam, Eastern region and is also operating as a reserve team for Ashanti Gold SC. The club is currently not in operation.
