= Kintampo, Ghana =

Town and District Capital in Bono East Region, Ghana

Kintampo
- Town and District Capital
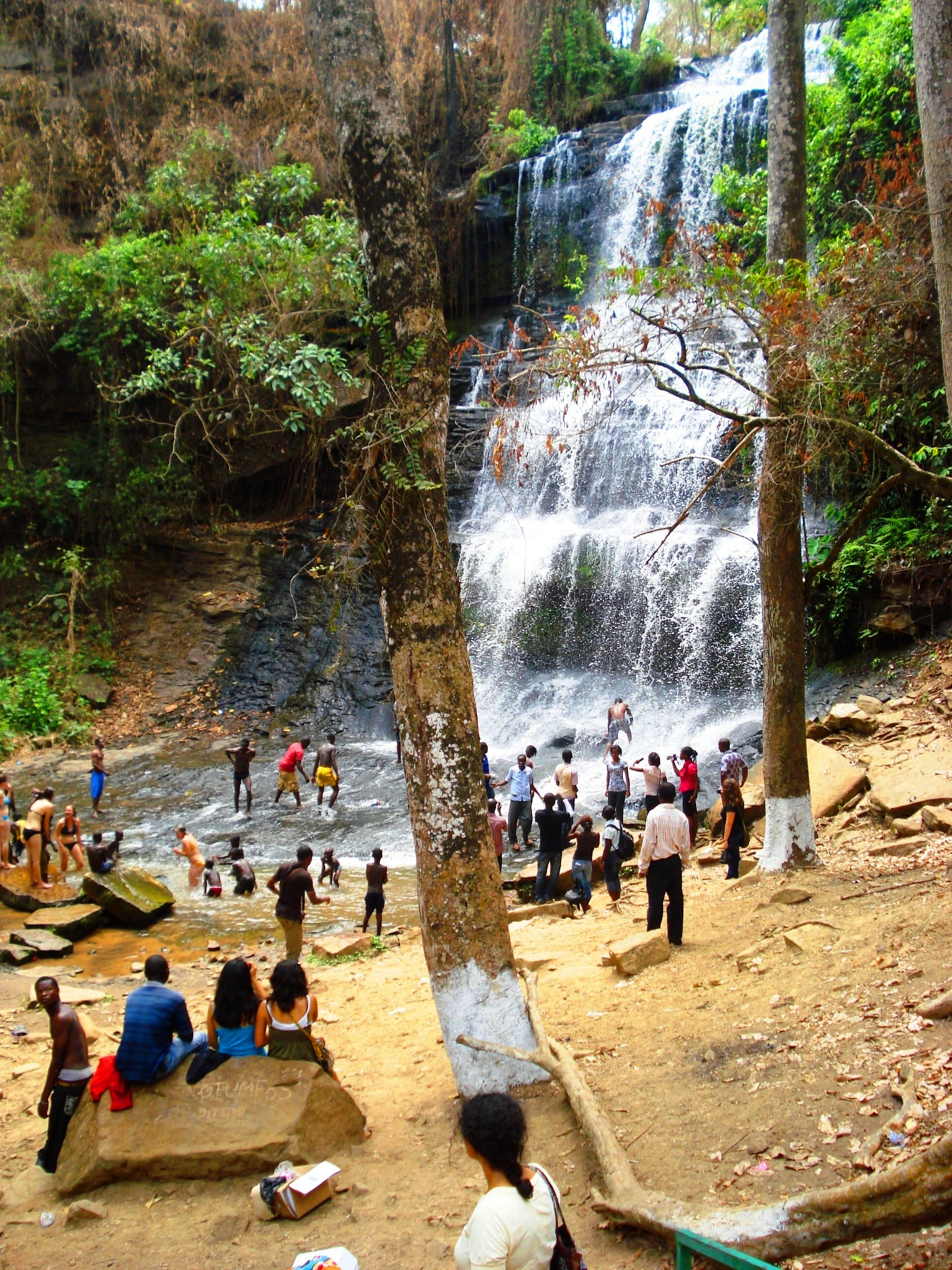
- Kintampo Waterfalls
- Nickname: Kings Town
- Location of Kintampo in Bono East
- Coordinates: 8°3′8″N 1°44′5″W
- Country: Ghana
- Region: Bono East
- District: Kintampo North Municipal

Population (2013)
  - Total: 111 000
  - Ethnicity: Bono people
- Time zone: GMT
  - Summer (DST): GMT

Kintampo is a town and tourist destination in the Bono East Region of Ghana. It became the capital of Kintampo North Municipal in 2004. Kintampo has a population of 111 000. It also served as the capital of the former Kintampo District. Kintampo also has Senior High Schools (KINSS) which is located at Kyeremankoma, has participated in the National Science Quiz on numerous occasions. Modern Senior High School (MODESS). Kintampo Technical Institute- KINTECH and Centre College Senior High School. There is a College of Health, The Kintampo College of Health and Well-being (CoHK) in the town, which is proposed to become a full fledge University. Most of the population in Kintampo are farmers, with production focused on yams, maize, cashew, mangoes, legumes, tubers and other vegetables. The main ethnicity of Kintampo are the Bono people. There are other settler tribes including the Wangara, Grushi, Grumah, Konkomba, Mo, Frafra and the others.

== Health ==
- Kintampo Government Hospital

== Economic activities ==
=== Tourism ===
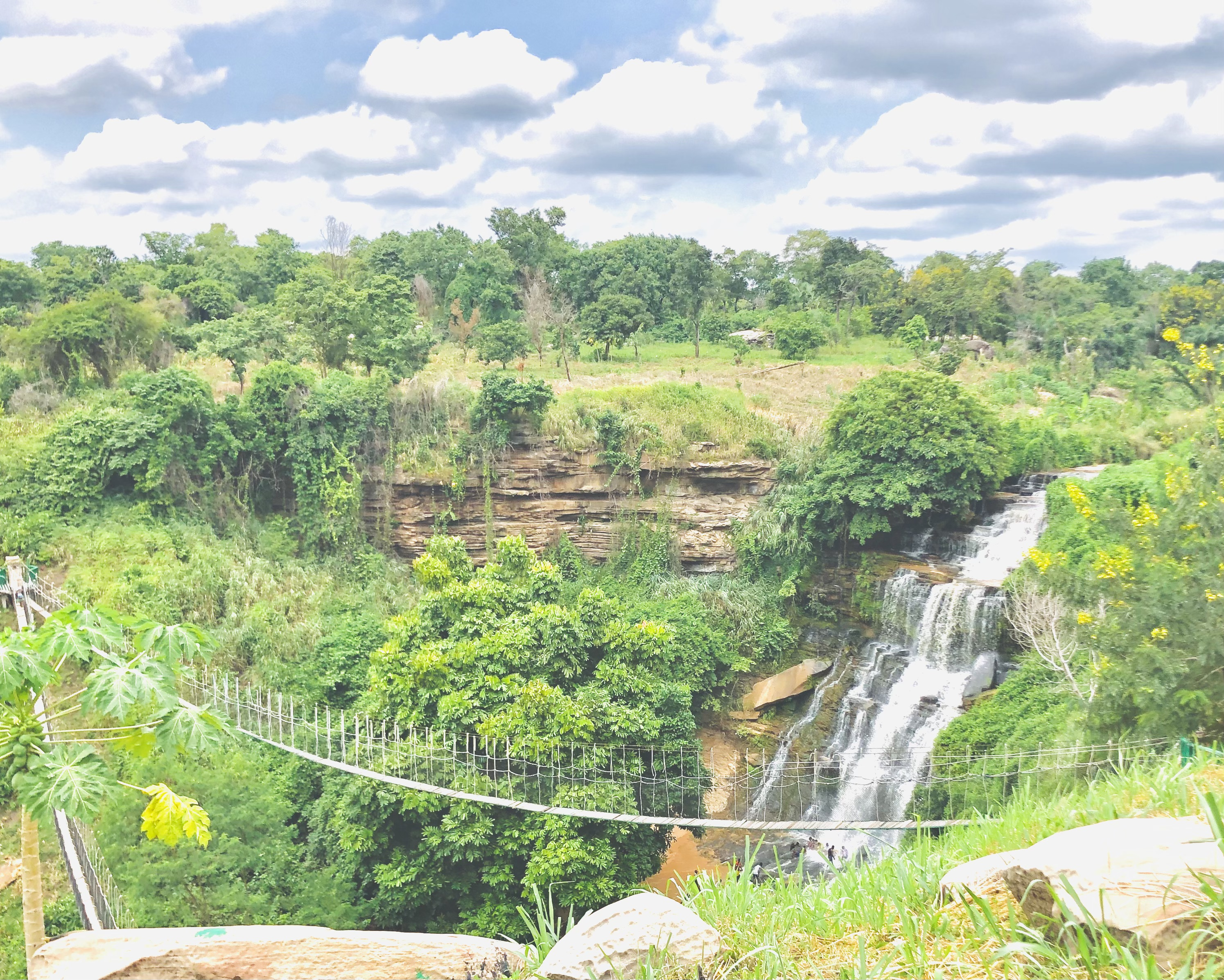
View of Kintampo waterfalls

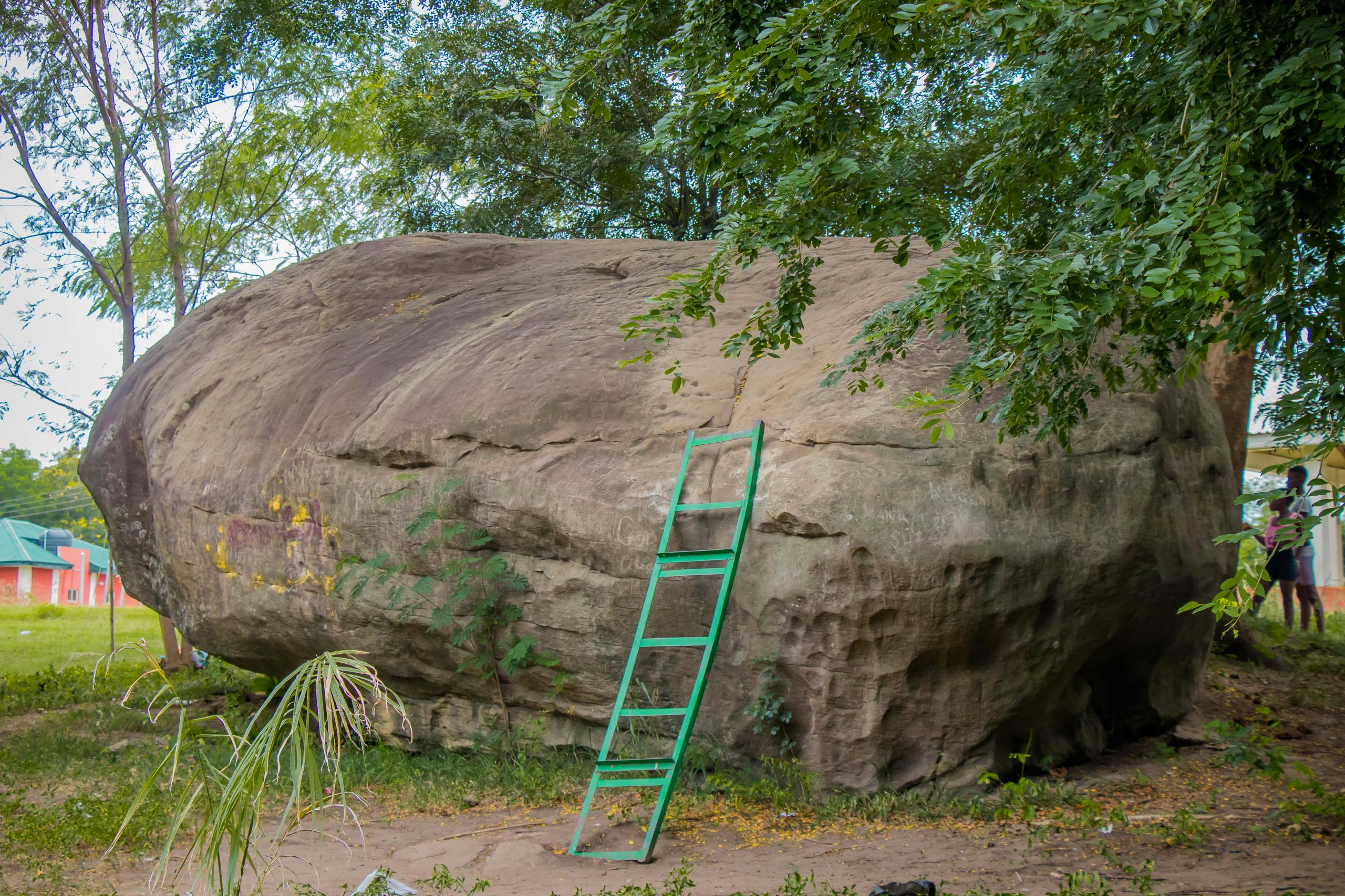
Big rock at the water falls

Kintampo is one of the tourist hubs of Ghana. There are several tourist attraction sites in the town notable among them are; Kintampo waterfalls, Kintampo Fuller Falls. However, another iconic monument that has put the town on the tourism map is the Centre of Ghana site.

=== Farming ===
Farming is the major occupation among the entire population of Kintampo. Most farmers here had turned the vast arable lands into cashew and mango plantations, making the town one of the leading cultivators of these crops. A lot more are also into food crops such as yam, cassava, maize, beans and vegetables.

Sifting cultivation or slash and burn, a farming system in which forests are burnt, releasing nutrients to support cultivation of annual and then perennial crops for a period of several years is the most used system in Kintampo. Kintampo has produced great and famous people. The renowned Baba Yara, former Ghanaian football great hails from Kintampo.

== Climate ==
Climate data for Kintampo (1981–2010)
Month	Jan	Feb	Mar	Apr	May	Jun	Jul	Aug	Sep	Oct	Nov	Dec	Year
Mean daily maximum °C (°F)	33.7 (92.7)	35.4 (95.7)	35.5 (95.9)	33.4 (92.1)	32.0 (89.6)	30.2 (86.4)	28.9 (84.0)	28.6 (83.5)	29.3 (84.7)	30.9 (87.6)	32.5 (90.5)	32.6 (90.7)	31.9 (89.5)
Mean daily minimum °C (°F)	20.4 (68.7)	22.2 (72.0)	23.6 (74.5)	23.3 (73.9)	22.9 (73.2)	22.0 (71.6)	21.6 (70.9)	21.3 (70.3)	21.5 (70.7)	21.7 (71.1)	21.9 (71.4)	20.9 (69.6)	21.9 (71.5)
Average rainfall mm (inches)	5.0 (0.20)	21.6 (0.85)	71.3 (2.81)	142.7 (5.62)	153.7 (6.05)	185.3 (7.30)	147.6 (5.81)	133.7 (5.26)	229.4 (9.03)	177.7 (7.00)	35.6 (1.40)	12.2 (0.48)	1,315.8 (51.81)
Average rainy days (≥ 0.1 mm)	1	2	5	8	10	11	10	9	15	13	3	1	88
Source: World Meteorological Organization

== Notable people ==
- Victoria Nyame, Member of Parliament
- Baba Yara, Ghanaian footballer
- [Lordina Mahama]
- [Alhaji Asoma Banda-Antrak]]
