= Banda =

Banda may refer to:

== People ==
- Banda (given name)
- Banda (surname)

== Places ==
=== Argentina ===
- Banda Department, a part of Santiago del Estero Province, Argentina

=== Canada ===
- Banda, Ontario, a settlement in Ontario

=== Ghana ===
- Banda Ahenkro, a town in Banda District
- Banda District, Ghana, a district in the Bono Region
  - Archaeology of Banda District (Ghana)
- Banda (Ghana parliament constituency), a constituency in the Bono Region

=== India ===
- Banda, East Godavari district, a village in Andhra Pradesh, India
- Banda, Maharashtra, a small town in Maharashtra
- Banda, Uttar Pradesh, a city and district headquarters of Banda District, Uttar Pradesh
- Banda District, India, a district in Uttar Pradesh
- Banda (Lok Sabha constituency), Uttar Pradesh
- Banda (Assembly constituency), a constituency of the Uttar Pradesh Legislative Assembly
- Banda (Vidhan Sabha constituency), Madhya Pradesh
- Banda, Madhya Pradesh, Town and Tehsil in Madhya Pradesh

=== Indonesia ===
- Banda Aceh, a capital and largest city of Aceh province
- Banda Islands, a group of ten small volcanic islands in the Banda Sea
- Banda Sea, the sea of the South Moluccas, a part of the Pacific Ocean

=== Uganda ===
- Banda, Uganda, a hill and the neighbourhood on that hill, located in Nakawa Division, within the city of Kampala

== Music ==
- "A Banda (Ah Bahn-da)", a composition by Chico Buarque
- Banda music, a form of Mexican music
- Banda (opera), a musical ensemble which is used in addition to the main opera orchestra and plays the music which is actually heard by the characters in the opera

== Other uses ==
- Banda people, an ethnic group of the Central African Republic, the Democratic Republic of Congo, Cameroon, and Sudan
- Banda languages, a family of Ubangian languages of Central Africa
- Banda language (Maluku), an Austronesian language of the Kei Islands, Indonesia
- Banda machine, a brand of spirit duplicator - a type of low-volume document copying machine
- Banda (state), a former princely state in India
- Banda, a large smoked fish in Chad
- Banda, a caste of adivasis in Odisha, Chhattisgarh, and Jharkhand
- Banda Deul, an 11th-century temple in Purulia district, West Bengal, India
- Banda, a clan of the Chewa people
- Banda TV, an Angolan television channel

== See also ==
- Bandar (disambiguation)
- Bande (disambiguation)
- Bandha (disambiguation)
- La Banda (disambiguation)
- Bandaa, a 2023 Indian film
