= Banda (surname) =

Banda is a surname. Notable people with the surname include:

== Arts and entertainment ==
- Banda Kanakalingeshwara Rao (1907–1968), Indian stage actor
- Lucius Banda (born 1970), Malawian musician and politician

== Military ==
- Abdallah Banda (born 1963), Sudanese military commander
- Banda Singh Bahadur (1670–1716), Sikh military leader

== Politicians ==
- Aleke Banda (1939–2010), Malawian politician
- Banda Karthika Reddy (born 1977), Indian politician
- Chimunthu Banda, Malawian politician
- Ester Banda, Zambian politician
- Etta Banda, Minister of Foreign Affairs of Malawi
- Hastings Banda (1898–1997), former President of Malawi
- Joyce Banda (born 1950), President of Malawi
- M. D. Banda (1914–1974), Sri Lankan politician
- Michael Banda (1930–2014), British-Sri Lankan Trotskyist
- Rupiah Banda (1937–2022), President of Zambia

== Sports ==
- Anthony Banda (born 1993), American baseball player
- Barbra Banda (born 2000), Zambian footballer
- Carlos Banda (born 1978), Chilean-Swedish football manager
- Chikondi Banda (1979–2013), Malawian footballer
- Christopher John Banda (1974–2009), Malawian footballer
- Danny Banda (born c. 1938), Canadian footballer
- Davi Banda (born 1983), Malawian footballer
- Dennis Banda (born 1988), Zambian football goalkeeper
- Elizet Banda (born 1988), Zambian runner
- Gift Banda (born 1969), Zimbabwean soccer administrator
- Gilbert Banda (born 1983), Zimbabwean football player
- Jacob Banda (born 1988), Zambian footballer
- Kumbulani Banda (born 1989), Zimbabwean footballer
- Lameck Banda (born 2001), Zambian footballer
- Lewis Banda (born 1982), Zimbabwean sprinter
- Patrick Banda (1974–1993), Zambian footballer
- Peter Banda (born 2000), Malawian footballer
- Richard Banda, Malawian jurist and athlete
- Sead Banda (born 1990), Montenegrin footballer

== Other people ==
- Asoma Banda (1933–2025), Ghanaian businessman and philanthropist
- Bobbie Banda (1947–2013), American Juaneño elder
- Gongalegoda Banda (1809–1849), Sri Lankan rebellion leader
- Siva Subrahmanyam Banda, Indian-American aerospace engineer
- Sylvia Banda, Zambian restaurateur

== See also ==
- Bandla
