= List of Djurgårdens IF Fotboll managers =

Djurgårdens Idrottsförening, also known simply as Djurgårdens IF, is a Swedish professional association football club based in Stockholm. The club is affiliated with Stockholms Fotbollförbund, and plays home games at 3Arena. The club's first team play in Allsvenskan as of 2015, the top league in Swedish football, which takes place from April to October every seasons. Djurgården won its first Swedish title 1912 Svenska Mästerskapet, and most recently repeated this in the 2019 Allsvenskan.

== Managers ==
Information correct as of matches played up until 19 December 2024. Matches include league, Allsvenskan play-offs, Svenska Cupen, European matches, and Royal League.

Name	Nationality	From	To	Pld	W	D	L	GF	GA	GD	Win%	Honours	Ref
John Maconnachie	Scotland	1922	1922										
Bertil Nordenskjöld	Sweden	1923	1929	110	53	20	37	276	177	+99	48.2		
Samuel Lindqvist	Sweden	1929	1932	64	44	10	10	194	78	+116	68.8		
Rudolf Kock; Samuel Lindqvist	Sweden; Sweden	1932	1934	48	22	13	13	0	0	+0	45.8		
Einar Svensson	Sweden	1935	1944	181	91	33	57	0	0	+0	50.3		
Per Kaufeldt	Sweden	1944	1950	133	63	16	54	280	240	+40	47.4	1944–45 Division 2 Norra; 1948–49 Division 2 Nordöstra	
David Astley	Wales	1950	1954	94	41	20	33	179	152	+27	43.6		
Frank Soo	England	1954	1955	22	14	5	3	53	27	+26	63.6	1954–55 Allsvenskan	
Kjell Cronqvist	Sweden	1955	1957	48	22	10	16	89	76	+13	45.8		
Lajos Szendrődi	Hungary	1957	1959	44	20	17	7	88	59	+29	45.5		
Birger Sandberg; Knut Hallberg	Sweden; Sweden	1959	1959	11	7	3	1	27	9	+18	63.6	1959 Allsvenskan	
George Raynor	England	1960	1960	3	0	1	2	2	8	−6	0.0		
Walter Probst	Austria	1960	1963	88	49	17	22	199	108	+91	55.7	1961 Division 2 Svealand	
Torsten Lindberg	Sweden	1964	1966	68	36	14	18	134	78	+56	52.9	1964 Allsvenskan; 1966 Allsvenskan	
Gösta Sandberg	Sweden	1967	1971	127	56	32	39	214	175	+39	44.1		
Antonio Durán	Spain	1972	1974	83	35	18	30	158	128	+30	42.2		
Bengt Persson	Sweden	1975	1978	116	43	36	37	174	155	+19	37.1		
Alan Ball, Sr.	England	1979	1979	0	0	0	0	0	0	+0	—		
Gösta Sandberg; Lars Arnesson	Sweden; Sweden	1979	1979	29	10	8	11	35	37	−2	34.5		
Arve Mokkelbost	Norway	1980	1981	60	18	11	31	68	91	−23	30.0		
Hans Backe	Sweden	1982	1984	83	45	21	17	151	82	+69	54.2	1982 Division 2 Norra	
Björn Westerberg	Sweden	1985	1986	54	25	12	17	82	60	+22	46.3	1985 Division 2 Norra	
Tommy Söderberg	Sweden	1987	1989	92	45	26	21	173	103	+70	48.9		
Lennart Wass	Sweden	1990	1991	61	23	20	18	105	77	+28	37.7	1989–90 Svenska Cupen	
Thomas Lundin	Sweden	1992	1992	35	12	13	10	60	62	−2	34.3		
Bo Petersson	Sweden	1993	1993	32	18	7	7	76	37	+39	56.3		
Anders Grönhagen	Sweden	January 1994	December 1996	95	48	16	31	193	123	+70	50.5	1994 Division 1 Norra	
Roger Lundin	Sweden	1997	1997	31	20	7	4	81	37	+44	64.5		
Michael Andersson	Sweden	1998	21 July 1999	45	23	6	16	81	63	+18	51.1	1998 Division 1 Norra	
Zoran Lukic; Sören Åkeby	Bosnia-Herzegovina; Sweden	21 July 1999	December 2003	148	90	25	33	315	158	+157	60.8	2002 Allsvenskan; 2003 Allsvenskan; 2000 Superettan; 2002 Svenska Cupen	
Zoran Lukic	Bosnia-Herzegovina	2004	22 July 2004	15	6	4	5	23	24	−1	40.0		
Kjell Jonevret	Sweden	22 July 2004	29 September 2006	98	51	21	26	168	103	+65	52.0	2005 Allsvenskan; 2004 Svenska Cupen; 2005 Svenska Cupen	
Anders Grönhagen	Sweden	29 September 2006	December 2006	6	3	1	2	9	7	+2	50.0		
Siggi Jónsson	Iceland	2007	2008	64	25	19	20	88	79	+9	39.1		
Andrée Jeglertz; Zoran Lukic	Sweden; Sweden	2009	3 June 2009	14	4	2	8	8	22	−14	28.6		
Andrée Jeglertz	Sweden	12 June 2009	November 2009	20	6	3	11	21	30	−9	30.0		
Carlos Banda; Lennart Wass	Sweden; Sweden	2010	3 May 2011	37	11	8	18	41	55	−14	29.7		
Magnus Pehrsson; Carlos Banda	Sweden; Sweden	4 May 2011	2011	26	11	5	10	32	31	+1	42.3		
Magnus Pehrsson	Sweden	2012	26 April 2013	40	11	16	13	50	56	−6	27.5		
Anders Johansson; Martin Sundgren	Sweden; Sweden	27 April 2013	15 May 2013	4	2	0	2	5	8	−3	50.0		
Per-Mathias Høgmo	Norway	15 May 2013	3 November 2013	24	12	8	4	36	24	+12	50.0		
Per Olsson	Sweden	1 January 2014	3 August 2016	87	36	20	31	143	109	+34	41.4		
Mark Dempsey	England	3 August 2016	30 October 2016	15	10	1	4	33	23	+10	66.7		
Özcan Melkemichel	Sweden	1 January 2017	31 December 2018	72	36	19	17	125	84	+41	50.0	2017–18 Svenska Cupen	
Kim Bergstrand; Thomas Lagerlöf	Sweden; Sweden	1 January 2019	21 October 2024	160	89	28	43	273	161	+112	55.6	2019 Allsvenskan	
Roberth Björknesjö	Sweden	22 October 2024	20 December 2024	8	6	0	2	14	8	+6	75.0		
Jani Honkavaara	Finland	20 December 2024	10 November 2026	73	36	15	22	144	78	+66	49.3		
