= Castilleja aquariensis =

Conservation status
- Imperiled (NatureServe)

Scientific classification
- Kingdom: Plantae
- Clade: Tracheophytes
- Clade: Angiosperms
- Clade: Eudicots
- Clade: Asterids
- Order: Lamiales
- Family: Orobanchaceae
- Genus: Castilleja
- Species: C. aquariensis

Binomial name
- Castilleja aquariensis N.H.Holmgren

Species of flowering plant

Castilleja aquariensis is a species of flowering plant in the family Orobanchaceae known by the common name Aquarius Plateau Indian paintbrush. It is endemic to Utah in the United States, where it occurs on the Aquarius Plateau, including Boulder Mountain. All occurrences are within the bounds of Dixie National Forest.

This perennial herb grows 15 to 30 centimeters tall and blooms in inflorescences with small flowers and large light yellow bracts. It is probably "somewhat parasitic."

This plant grows in sagebrush-grass meadows in subalpine climates and openings in stands of spruce. The soils are rocky.

There are approximately 75,000 individuals in a peak year. Its range is about 270 square miles. The species was once on the United States Fish and Wildlife Service's list of candidates for federal protection. It was removed in 2006. The main threat is grazing, as its habitat has been impacted by the presence of livestock, especially sheep. The Aquarius Plateau in general has been overgrazed. Gophers cause localized damage to populations by burying plants. Plants are also infested with grasshoppers and crickets; these insects cause greater impacts during drought years.
