= Potentilla angelliae =

Conservation status
- Critically Imperiled (NatureServe)

Scientific classification
- Kingdom: Plantae
- Clade: Tracheophytes
- Clade: Angiosperms
- Clade: Eudicots
- Clade: Rosids
- Order: Rosales
- Family: Rosaceae
- Genus: Potentilla
- Species: P. angelliae

Binomial name
- Potentilla angelliae N.H.Holmgren

Species of flowering plant

Potentilla angelliae is a rare species of flowering plant in the rose family known by the common names Angell cinquefoil and Boulder Mountain cinquefoil. It is endemic to Utah in the United States, where it is known only from Boulder Mountain on the Aquarius Plateau.

This plant was first described in 1987. It is a perennial herb with spreading or prostrate stems up to 11 centimeters long. Each leaf is divided into a few lobed or toothed leaflets. Yellow flowers bloom in July.

There are five known occurrences of this plant, with an estimated total of 19,000 individuals. The plants grow in a rocky subalpine meadow at an elevation of 11,000 feet. Other plants in the habitat include its close relative, Potentilla concinna.
