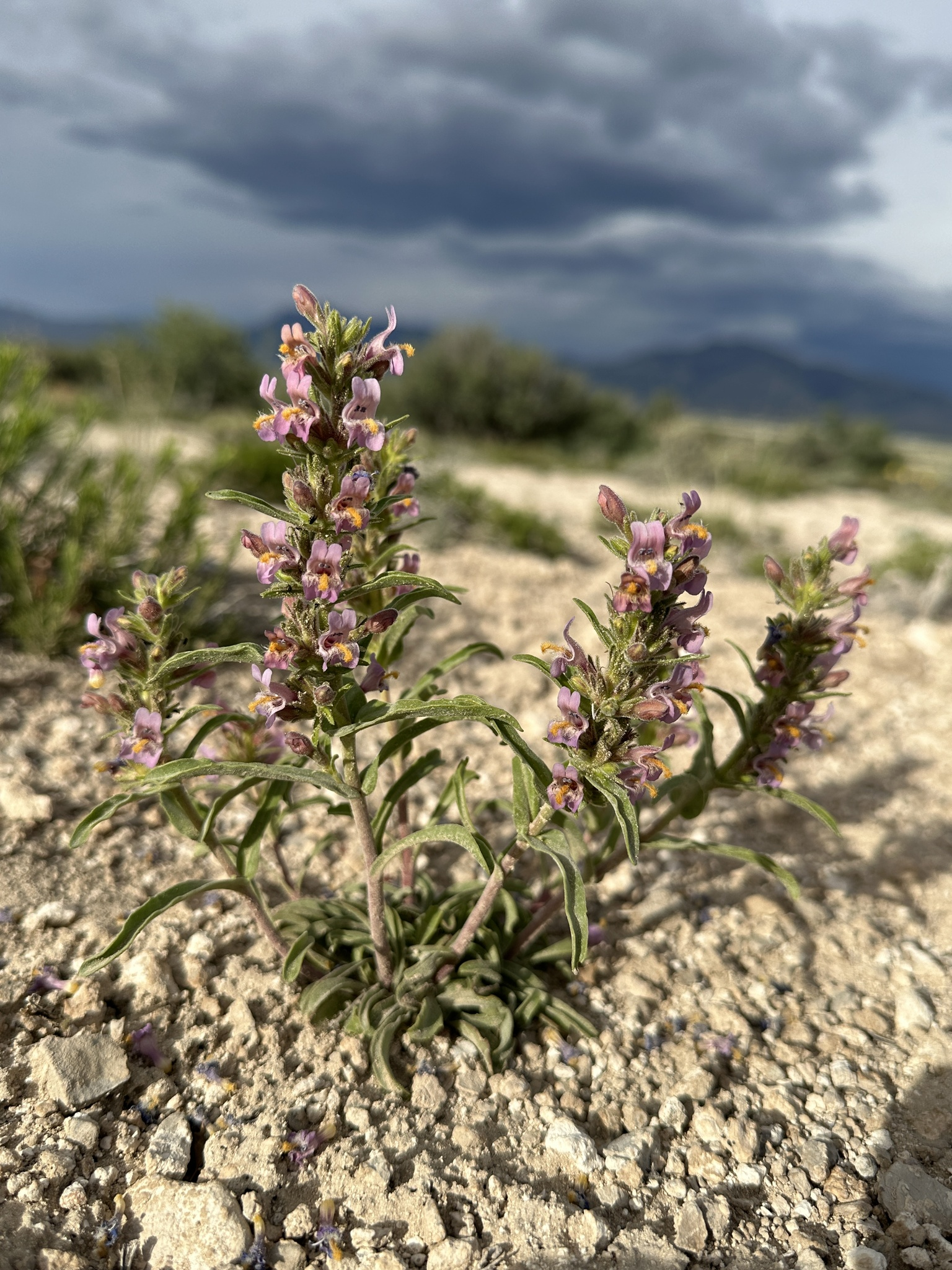
- Penstemon barnebyi Wayne E Kirch Wildlife Management Area, Nevada

Conservation status
- Vulnerable (NatureServe)

Scientific classification
- Kingdom: Plantae
- Clade: Tracheophytes
- Clade: Angiosperms
- Clade: Eudicots
- Clade: Asterids
- Order: Lamiales
- Family: Plantaginaceae
- Genus: Penstemon
- Species: P. barnebyi

Binomial name
- Penstemon barnebyi N.H.Holmgren

= Penstemon barnebyi =

Plant species in the plantain family

Penstemon barnebyi is a species of penstemon known by the common names White River Valley beardtongue and Barneby's beardtongue. It is native to the mountain and basin territory of central western Nevada, where it grows in sagebrush and woodland; there is also one occurrence just over the California border.

== Description ==
Penstemon barnebyi is a herbaceous plant that grows perennially and it relatively long lived, for a Penstemon. Its stems are retrorsely hairy, having backwards facing hairs, and either grow straight upwards or out a short distance before curving to grow upwards to a height of 5 to 30 centimeters (2 to 12 in). Though usually it is less than 20 cm (8 in) tall.

Plants have both basal leaves and cauline leaves, those that sprout directly from the base of the plant and attached to the stems. Like the stems they are retrorsely hairy and the basal leaves and ones lowest on the stems have petioles, leaf stems, attaching them to the plant. Lower leaves usually range in length from 12 to 55 millimeters (1/2 to 2 1/4 in), but may occasionally reach 75 mm (3 in), their width is 4 to 12 mm (1/4 to 1/2 in). Their shape is elliptic to spatulate.

Higher up on the stems the leaves are shorter and narrower, 19 to 65 millimeters (3/4 to 2 1/2 in) long and just 2 to 8 mm (1/8 to 3/8 in) wide. They are also lanceolate to oblanceolate, shaped like a spear head or a reversed one. The edges of all leaves may be smooth or somewhat toothed.

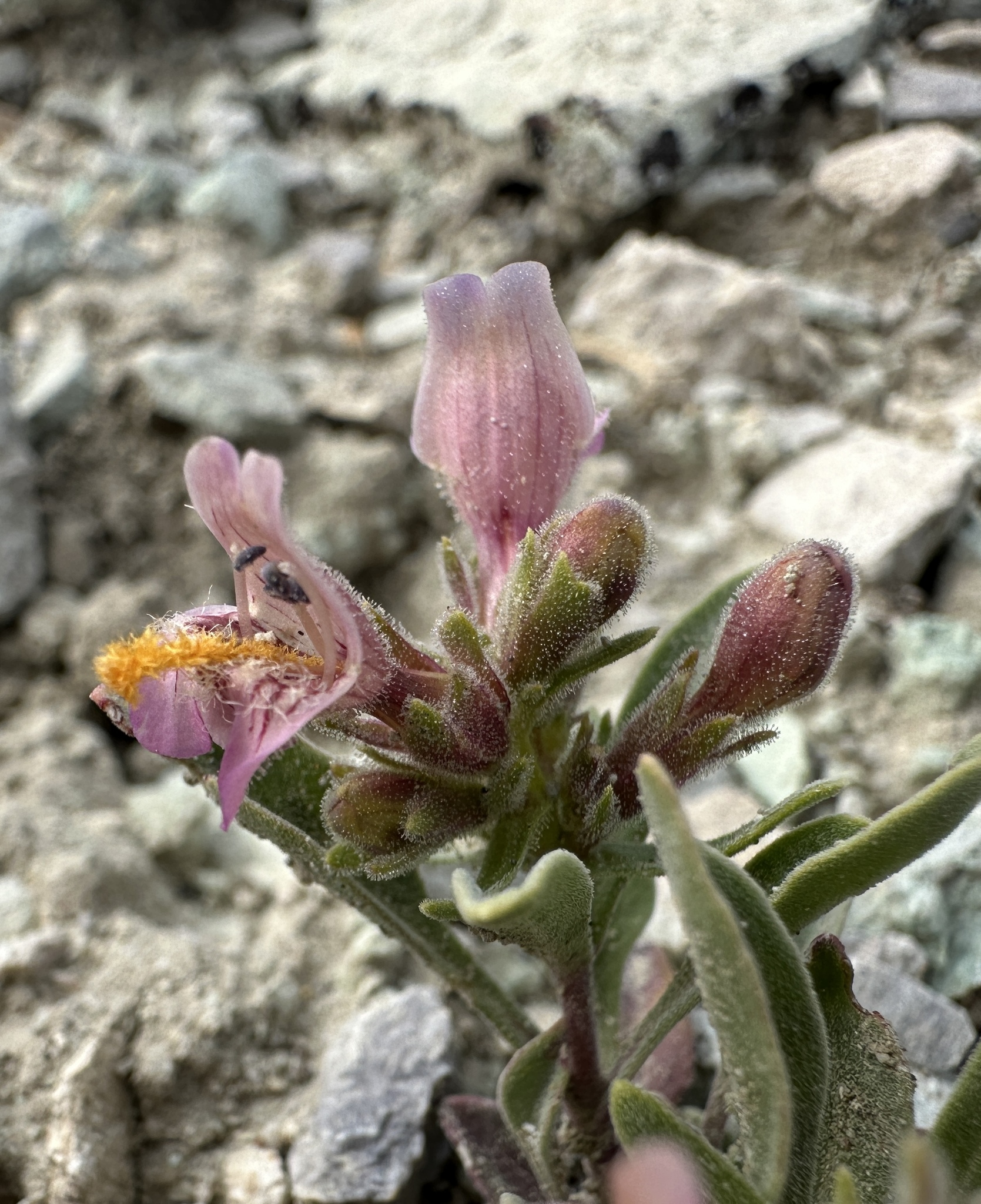
Inflorescence covered in glandular hairs and flower

The inflorescence portion of the stem is densely covered with glandular hairs as are the buds and flowers. Its length may be 2 to 10 centimeters (1 to 4 in) long and the flowers are densely packed on it. Each one will have three to eight groups of flowers with paired bracts 10 to 70 mm (1/2 to 2 3/4 in) long just under each group.

The tubular flowers are 10 to 14 millimeters (1/2 to 1/2 in) long and violet in color externally, but more blue towards their ends. The throat of the flower is white with purple stripes and yellowish hairs. The protruding staminode is covered in bright orange hairs and 9–10 mm long.

== Taxonomy ==
The species Penstemon barnebyi was scientifically described in 1979 by Noel Herman Holmgren. It has no varieties or synonyms.

=== Names ===
The species name, barnebyi, was picked by Holmgren to honor Rupert Barnebyi, a taxonomist who worked at the New York Botanical Garden. In English it is known both as the White River Valley beardtongue and White River Valley penstemon. In addition it is also known as Barneby's beardtongue.

== Range and habitat ==
Penstemon barnebyi is native to the US states of Nevada and California. In California it is only known from Mono County. Specifically it is known from collections made along Busher Creek in the White Mountains in the Inyo National Forest. In Nevada it grows in the southern half of White Pine County, the northern part of Lincoln County, and north central Nye County. It has also been located in Esmeralda County and Mineral County, Nevada which border Mono County, California. It grows in locations between 1,500–500 m (4,900–1,600 ft) in elevation.

It grows in gravelly dry washes or in calcareous silt soils in sagebrush steppes or between pinyon–juniper woodlands.

=== Conservation ===
In 2001 NatureServe evaluated Penstemon barnebyi and rated it as vulnerable at the global level (G3). They concluded it was also vulnerable (S3) in the state of Nevada and critically imperiled (S1) in California. Though it is common within its range this area was believed to be very restricted.

== See also ==
List of Penstemon species
