= Archaeology of Banda District (Ghana) =

Aspect of archaeology in Ghana

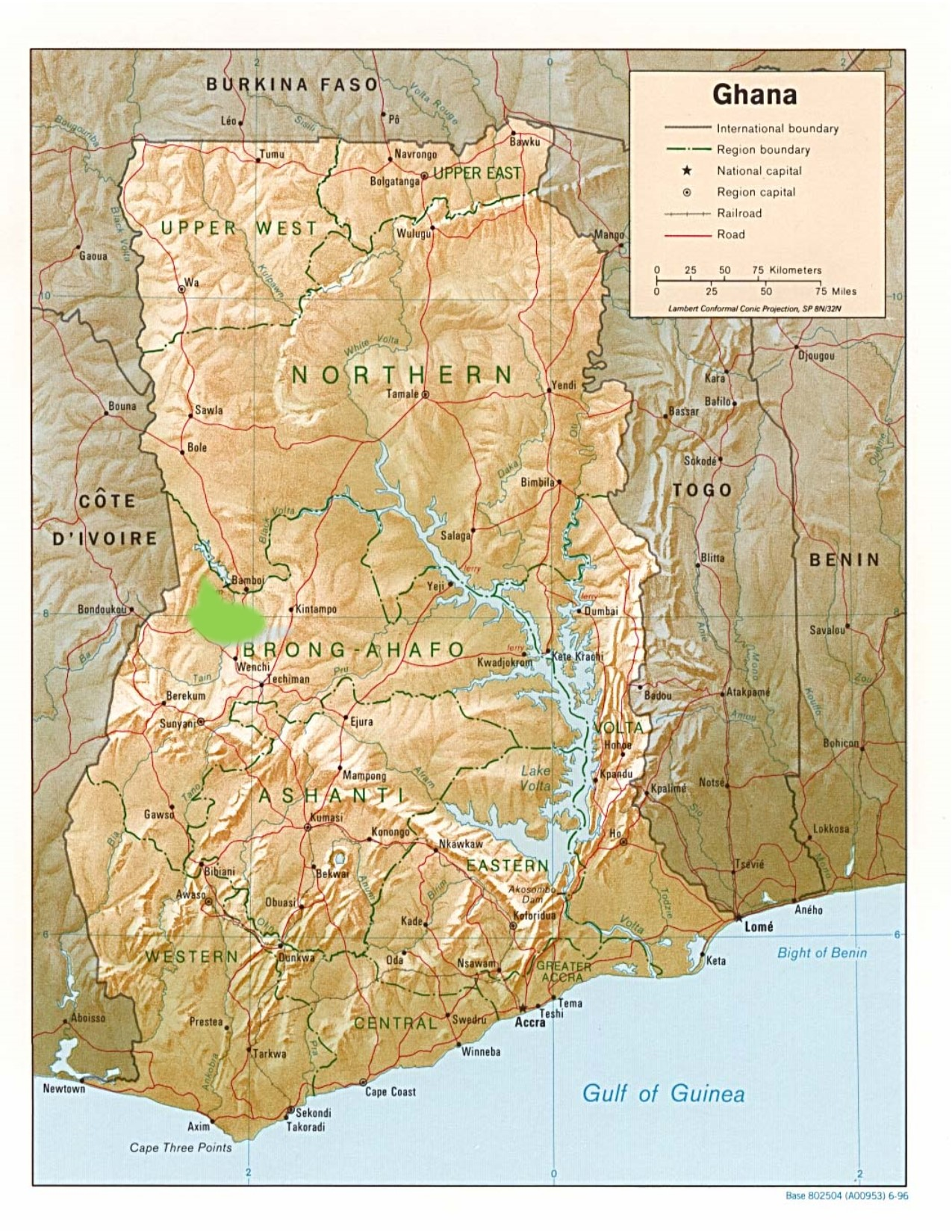
Map of the Banda District in Ghana

Banda District in Ghana plays an important role in the understanding of trade networks and the way they shaped the lives of people living in western Africa. Banda District is located in West Central Ghana, just south of the Black Volta River in a savanna woodland environment. This region has many connections to trans-Saharan trade, as well as Atlantic trade and British colonial and economic interests. The effects of these interactions can be seen archaeologically through the presence of exotic goods and export of local materials, production of pottery and metals, as well as changes in lifestyle and subsistence patterns. Pioneering archaeological research in this area was conducted by Ann Stahl.

== Trans-Saharan trade period ==
The period of trans-Saharan trade in what's now Banda District started around C.E. 1300 and lasted into the 17th century. Many of the early villages in this area were heavily influenced by the trade networks connecting the Sahara. The Banda in particular had a relationship with the Nigerian trade network, where wooded savanna resources such as gold, kola nut, and ivory were traded for northern goods like copper alloys, salt, and textiles. There is some question as to whether peoples in Banda District received these goods directly, or if they were obtained through larger settlements in the area.

=== European interest ===
European interest in Western African resources really took off during this period starting around C.E. 1400 through C.E. 1650. A major contributing factor to this sudden interest was due to the tales of Mansa Musa, the leader of Mali, and his travels to Mecca covered in gold. The Portuguese had a particularly large presence along the Gold Coast at this point, setting up a fort at Elmina and rapidly exploring the surrounding area.

=== Craft production ===
==== Pottery ====
The form and decoration of pottery in these sites is very similar to that of Begho, and its well made homogeneous nature implies that a good deal of specialization was occurring. Before the Ngre and Kuulo Phases of ceramics in Banda District, there was the Volta Phase, whose pottery was characterized by red painted geometric motifs, with no real evidence for northern relationships. Neutron activation analysis of shards excavated from the site Kuulo Kataa show that the different clay types being used were fairly homogeneous as well, which supports the idea of local production. Much of the clay used came from east of the Banda hills, and craftsmen were using the same clay regardless of the form or treatment of the vessels they were making.

Jars are broken down into two main categories, those whose rims flare out from the constriction point, and those that are more globular in shape. Much of the decoration is found on the rims of the vessels, and they are either surface treated with cord wrapped roulette or mat impressions which are then offset by grooved lines and motifs. Various tempering agents were used as well, with some vessels even having evidence of metal slag being used as a temper.

==== Metal working ====
This area of Africa is known for its large deposits of metal, particularly iron ore and gold. There is much evidence for metalworking activities on site in Banda through material goods such as vessels, tools, weapons, and ornaments, as well as the iron slag left behind as a result of the metalworking processes. There is also the presence of burned basin-shaped features and anvils at varying levels, indicating multiple episodes of likely seasonal use of metalworking sites. The high volume of slag found at sites such as Kuulo Kataa imply that much more was being produced than was necessary just for the people living there, and surpluses were being accumulated for trade and other activities. Among the metalworking artifacts recovered, there are several ornamental rings made of iron, tools such as tanged curved knives and blades, as well as a serpentine projectile.

==== Textiles ====
Although the production of textiles was common in sites near Banda District such as Begho, there is no real evidence yet recovered to suggest that textile production was being done in Banda itself. In one excavation, only a single fragmented spindle whorl was found, though the absence of something doesn't necessarily mean it wasn't happening.

=== Ritual activity ===
Some metalworking sites, such as the one at Ngre Kataa, have evidence of some ritual behavior. At excavations of these mounds, three distinct levels have been identified. Lower levels of metalworking mounds often contain evidence of foundational ritual practices and human interments over top of which metalworking would have taken place. These interments include a variety of age groups from infant through adulthood, as well as differences in how they were placed. On the middle levels of the mounds, there is evidence of shrine clusters that could have been used in divination activities. The shrines would have been visible within the work area, and may have been connected to efficiency, protection, and help in solving problems. One example of a shrine included an iron bangle, the earliest found in the Banda area, a quartz pebble, two iron blades, a bone fragment, and a cast brass twinned figurine. The figurine is interesting because it is a form that has been found to be connected to divination and have magical properties. In another area, an earthenware jar was discovered containing cowrie shells from the coast of the Seychelles. Not only does this discovery demonstrate the trade connections of the time, but it also supports the idea that divination was utilized due to the mystic association of the cowrie shells.

=== Subsistence and lifestyle ===
During the period of trans-Saharan trade, both evidence for wild and domestic subsistence are present. The presence of maize phytoliths imply experimentation with New World crops, as well as pearl millet and sorghum which were successful in that they are extremely drought resistant. Maize is believed to have been spread to the interior of West Africa by the Bono, who used it as a war staple food. So far, New World crops are the earliest known products of the Atlantic trade to reach Banda District. During this phase, greater importance was placed on crops that reduced risks of food shortage, and community support practices were used to ensure all had access to food even in times of drought. These practices resulted in high food security for Banda District people for many years. Large numbers of animal bones, particularly those of mammals, show a greater reliance still on hunting and trapping methods for getting food and skins. Many faunal remains come from difficult to hunt species, requiring a considerable degree of skill and knowledge of these animals and their environments. For example, the remains of large and dangerous animals such as lions, hippos, and warthogs have been found. Although people relied greatly on animal resources, there is little evidence for reliance on domesticated animals. Also at these sites, there is evidence of some fish and other water resources, most of which can be traced to the Volta River over 20 kilometers away. It is due to this distance that the Banda District is thought to have acquired their water resources through local and regional trade networks. Small amounts of marine shells indicate some small degree of trade with coastal areas as well. Some animal domesticates such as sheep/goat, cattle, horse, and donkey were present, with perhaps the most prevalent being domesticated dog. The butchering of dogs and spread of their remains often has had a ritual or spiritual connotation. Presence of animal domesticates also may be affected by fragmentation and preservation of faunal remains.

Villages were set up so that houses were arranged into large connected compounds, with areas of high density in pottery and metal slag. Rebuilding and fixing of structures, along with huge middens, imply a large degree of residential stability.

=== Sites ===
==== Ngre Kataa ====
At the site of Ngre Kataa, evidence for village occupation can be found from the 14th through the 17th centuries. At this time the village was about two to three hectares in size, and has evidence of various craft activities, iron production, and farming of foods such as pearl millet and sorghum. Although there is evidence of these crops, hunting and gathering as well as livestock still remained as important aspects of their diet.

==== Kuulo Kataa ====
This is a multi-component site located just north of Makala Kataa, another site in Banda. Kuulo Kataa is approximately 2.8 hectares in size with mounds of various ages and sizes. Here, excavations yielded quite high densities of animal bones, pottery and iron slag, with the average pottery density being 5,400 sherds per cubic meter. This implies greater intensity of occupation in comparison to later sites in this area.

At the site of Kuulo Kataa, there is evidence for both inter-regional and trans-Saharan trade of materials such as gold, marine shells, glass beads, and copper alloys. This area was important in linking trade between the forest areas to the south and the drier areas to the north. Here is also where the compound arrangement of houses is found, as well as high densities of pottery and iron slag related to craft production. In Kuulo Kataa, ceramic styling is very similar to that found at a site from the same time known as Begho, showing connections among local groups in the area.

==== Begho ====
Begho was another major stop in these trade routes connecting the Sahara and forest edges, and was located just north of Banda. It remained as a trade center until the Atlantic trade networks took over in West Africa. A team of archaeologists excavated over 1500 mounds at this site, and used radiocarbon dating to place its peak occupancy between the 15th and 18th centuries. Begho is home to various artifacts such as copper alloys, beads, glass and porcelain. It also has evidence of craft specialization as shown by the presence of a brass foundry and furnaces.

This site was once divided into quarters that corresponded to various ethnic groups at the time. Although Begho was divided physically, the stylistic aspects of craft such as pottery design remained consistent throughout the entire site.

== Atlantic trade period ==
Atlantic trade routes were more heavily used at the end of the 18th century, and led to a decline in the use of trans-Saharan routes. During this time, a stronger focus was placed on gold and minerals, and eventually slaves through the Atlantic slave trade. This time is also associated with periods of warfare and conflict with a group known as the Asante, who had a large influence on day to day stability and productiveness of those living in the Banda District.

=== Early Makala ===
The Early Makala Phase was characterized by much intermittent warfare, and the increase of slave trade activity in the area. The Asante, a forest state to the south, had a significant impact on the Banda District during this time. The Asante came together in the 17th century and slowly began to take control of areas to the north throughout the 18th century with goals to control the Niger River trade. This included the Banda District, where many sites such as Makala Kataa were abandoned during times of conflict with the Asante and then resettled once the trouble subsided. Their military campaigns resulted in the capture of the site Bono Maso as well as Begho. Often the Asante would require the Banda people of the areas they conquered to fight in wars they were fighting with other groups. By the early 19th century, the Asante took control of much of the northern trade in the Sahara. This resulted in a decreased amount of long distance trade goods found in Banda, but also a flourish in local and regional markets. Not only was there a stronger focus on regional trade, but also a greater narrowing of crafts which may indicate some loss of wealth in Banda to the Asante.

==== Craft production ====
Unlike in the previous period, on site metalworking was not prominent in the Early Makala. Very little slag has been recovered at the sites, meaning that either production was off site somewhere, or people relied more heavily on metal goods received via trade with other areas.

There also was a lack of evidence for on-site pottery production during this time. Much decoration seen during the Kuulo phase was lost, with people seeming to favor surface-treated pottery with maize cob roulette and shallow grooving for patterns. Typically, vessels had everted rims, and came in a variety of shapes and sizes. One difference in particular from the Kuulo phase was the clay sourcing. Not only was there a greater diversity of clay sources, but specific clay sources were being used for specific types of vessels. For example, clay used to make jars came from west of the hills, while clay used for bowls likely came from the east. This suggests a strong regional trade between Banda and groups to the east and west during the Early Makala. Pipes also become much more common, reflecting the increase in tobacco usage and smoking in the region.

During this time, an increase in the presence of spindle whorls can be seen in the archaeological record. This reflects a shift to household textile production rather than large-scale production and specialization.

==== Subsistence and lifestyle ====
Early Makala settlements typically featured rectangular structures made up of adjoining rooms. Walls were formed using coursed earth techniques, with some areas having up to three levels of floors in order to seal older floor layers and support collapsed walls. One excavation led to the discovery of a kitchen with two hearths, indicating an accommodation of the wet and dry seasons that characterized the area.

Subsistence at this time remained as a mixture of hunting, collecting, and domestication. There was a shift away from the hunting of dangerous species like hippos and lions, and a greater dependence on lizards, snakes and rodents instead. Animal domesticates include chicken, guinea fowl, dog, sheep/goat, and cattle. As for plants, sites show evidence of carbonized sorghum and maize phytoliths, that grew together in this area for quite some time. These crops are thought to have been ideal supplements to their diet during times when other crops like yams were in short supply.

=== Late Makala ===
The Late Makala Period is when British soldiers started to make a presence in the Banda District, specifically from 1890 to the 1920s. There is also evidence for a move from compound housing to free standing structures easy to disassemble and move, which is seen as a reflection of the British presence in the area. During this time, there was a shift to more local hunting and gathering as well as an increase in European goods and trade networks. Although people began to resettle villages left during conflicts with the Asante, the houses were much less sturdy, the pottery more simple and uniform in style, and the trade connections were contracted. Regional trade was being done on a smaller scale, and the local trade relationships that remained intact focused to the east of the Banda hills as opposed to the east and west like in the Early Makala period. This is thought to reflect the local warfare at the time. To the west of the Banda District is Bondoukou, the capital of Gyaman led by Samori who led his army to conquer much land across West Africa, so the people of Banda focused to the east in an attempt to lessen interactions. At this point, there is also evidence for increased tensions between European and African interests. For example, the British and Asante fought along the coast for control of land and other resources, eventually leading to the British capture of the Asante capital, Kumasi. In 1894, the Banda signed a treaty with a British traveler, marking the end of the control of the Asante over the Banda region.

==== Craft production ====
In the Late Makala, there was a shift from locally made goods towards more manufactured ones as a result of British presence in the area. This shift to manufactured goods was an attempt by the British in the area to expand trade into more European markets. One of the first crafts to go was pipe making, with metalworking and pottery following behind. Although production slowed down drastically for trade purposes, locally made ceramics were still used in the household. Neutron analysis of the clay put the clay source to the east of the hills for over half of the samples, and the same clay source was being used for both bowls and jars, which contrasts the earlier period. Stylistically, the decoration on the pottery is also much more closely related to that seen in this area today. During this time there is no evidence for extensive on site metalworking either. All samples found were likely acquired through trade and then modified for their own purposes. The only craft that remained from the early Makala was that of textile production. The system of household production of textiles remained intact despite increased demand for manufactured goods in trade networks.

==== Subsistence and lifestyle ====
The Banda during this time continued to rely on wild animals, particularly mammals, as evidenced by the faunal remains recovered from the site, and the diversity of faunal remains is more consistent with that of the Kuulo Phase. Crops such as yams, corn, groundnuts and cassava continue to show up with increasing intensity, as well as tobacco. There is even evidence that tobacco being grow in the Banda District was being sold in the nearby Kintampo Complex.

Residential units in the late Makala were very minimal, meaning they were quite simple and made out of two rooms. These were typically pole and daga structures that could be put up very quickly and efficiently. They also had only one floor level and lacked any kind of compound formation.

=== Slavery ===
During the height of the slave trade, the Banda District served as a source of slaves, as well as a place for the containment, holding and purchasing of war captives. The Bono were known to send Banda war captives from their military campaigns in the north into the Atlantic trade as slaves. During the 19th century, there was a considerable increase in slave demands to satisfy not only the Atlantic slave trade, but the internal slave trade as well. Much of the internal slave demand was generated by their use as payments and laborers in harvesting crops and other resources such as gold. With the influence of the British, changes in economic structure can also be seen. Groups here moved from practices that were community based and resistant to risk, to practices that were more focused on the individual and favored the production of specialized commodities.

=== Sites ===
==== Makala Kataa ====
This site shows evidence of two occupations, one larger one during the late 18th and early 19th centuries, and a much shorter one from the late 19th century until the 1920s. The early settlement had a site size of around 18 hectares, and remained as a fairly long-lived settlement until its abrupt abandonment. The later occupation has only yielded shallow cultural deposits of imported goods such as a coin, glass bottles, and pipes.

== British influence ==
British involvement in the Banda District began in the late 19th century. The British were enmeshed in many struggles for the land and other resources of the area, with both the Asante and other groups. One such group was led by a man named Imam Samori. Samori led his army on horses, and conquered land all the way from Guinea to Côte d'Ivoire. The British helped prevent Samori from taking Banda, due to fears that it would disrupt trade in the region.

Although they imposed a colonial administration in Banda, the British at first remained fairly separate from the peoples everyday life. Their interest in Banda revolved mostly around economic goods and materials, as opposed to having an active presence in ruling the area. Later, Banda production was shifted to suit the trends and desires of European markets, and resources such as cocoa and slaves quickly became major exports. The British also instituted a uniform currency, where taxes and other fees were all required to be paid using this system instead of the cowrie shell system previously utilized by the Banda people.

== Additional reading ==
- Logan, Amanda L. The Scarcity Slot: Excavating histories of food security in Ghana. University of California Press, 2020.
