= Blind Lake =

Blind Lake may refer to:

- Blind Lake Township, Cass County, Minnesota
- Blind Lake, Utah, high alpine lake located on Boulder Mountain, Utah
- Blind Lake, 65 acres in size at Pinckney State Recreation Area, Michigan
- Blind Lake (novel), of 2003 by American-Canadian science fiction author Robert Charles Wilson

== See also ==
- Sheosar Lake ('Blind Lake' in Shina language), an alpine lake in Deosai National Park, Gilgit-Baltistan, Pakistan
- Zharba Lake or Blind lake, a panoramic lake near Shigar, Gilgit-Baltistan, Pakistan
