= Ifisashi =

Zambian dish prepared with greens and peanuts

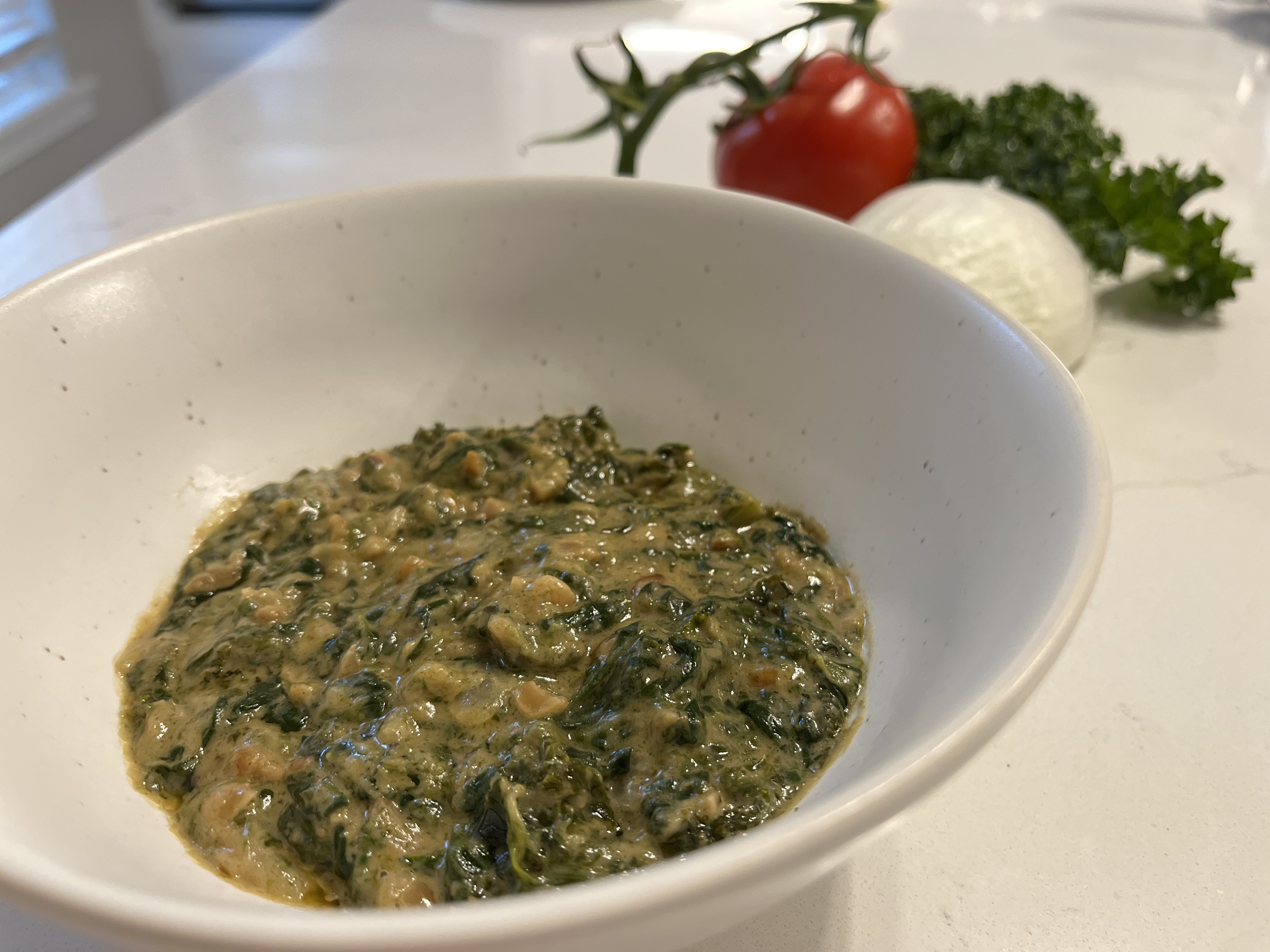
- Ifisashi
- Alternative names: Visashi (or V'sachy)
- Course: Main
- Place of origin: Zambia
- Serving temperature: Hot

Ifisashi (in Bemba) or visashi (in Chinyanja) is a traditional Zambian dish prepared with greens and peanuts. Ifisashi is most often eaten with nshima. It is considered a vegetarian dish, but meat can be added if desired. Ifisashi is a dish best enjoyed hot and is often served as a main course. In Zambia, ifisashi is accompanied by cereals such as millet, sorghum, rice, cassava, or yam when nshima is not available.

== Preparation ==
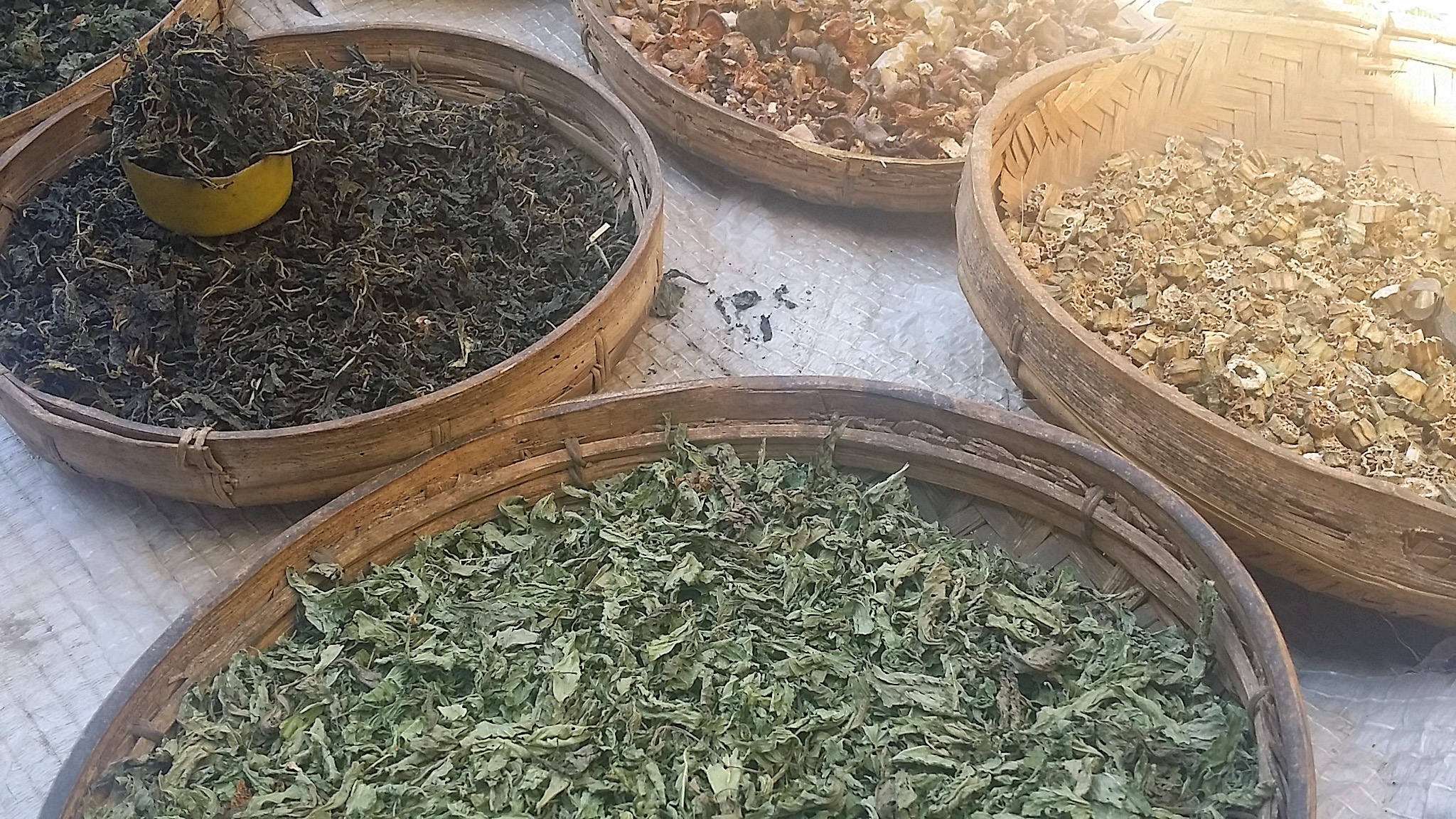
Dried vegetables used to make ifisashi

To cook ifisashi, ingredients such as roasted peanuts, chopped onion, tomatoes, greens, peanut oil, and water are used. The most common greens used are pumpkin leaves, sweet potato leaves, beet greens, mustard greens, spinach, collard greens, and kale. The peanuts are first ground. The ground peanuts, onion, and tomatoes are added to the boiling water. Then, the greens are added. The mixture is cooked until it reaches a thicker consistency.
