= Zambian cuisine =

Culinary traditions of Zambia

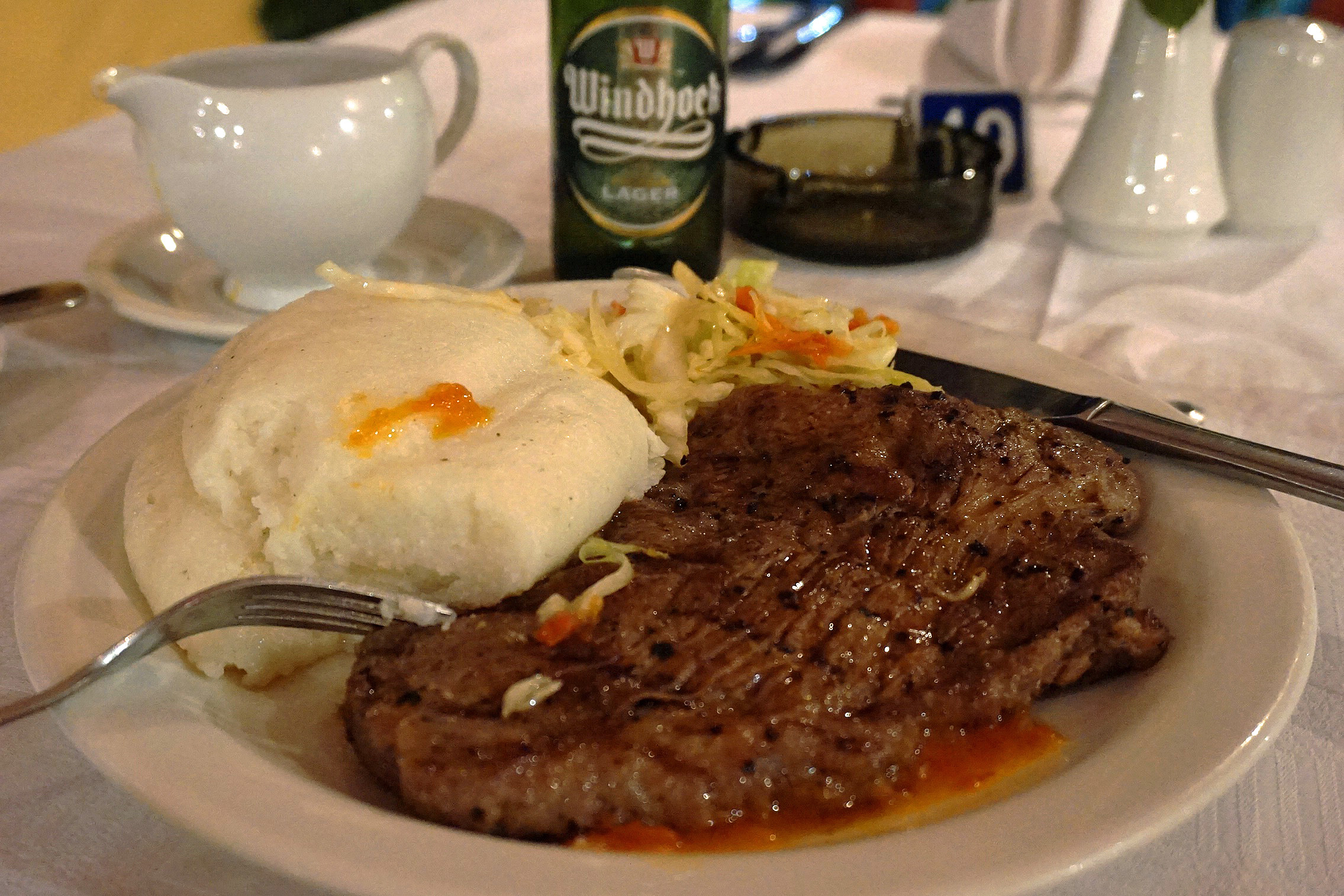
Nshima and beef relish from Proteas Hotel, Chingola, Zambia

Zambian cuisine offers a range of dishes, which primarily features nshima, a staple thick porridge crafted from maize flour, locally known as mealie meal. Nshima itself is quite plain, but it is typically accompanied by an array of traditional Zambian side dishes that introduce a spectrum of flavors to the meal.

== About ==
=== Food ===
Zambia's cultural diversity, comprising over 72 tribes across 10 provinces, has an array of culinary practices. The national cuisine is unified by staple foods, with variations manifesting chiefly in cooking techniques that vary by region. A notable example is the common snack tute ne mbalala, made from cassava and groundnuts, which is roasted in some locales while fried in others. Additionally, Zambia's tropical climate facilitates the cultivation of a vast range of crops that contribute to the local gastronomy. Markets and street vendors are abundant with fresh vegetables, and foraged wild greens are also a staple in the Zambian diet.

Zambia's staple food is maize. Nshima makes up the main component of Zambian meals and is made from pounded white maize. It is served with "relish", stew and vegetables and eaten by hand (preferably the right hand). Nshima is eaten during lunch and dinner. Nshima may be made at home, at food stalls and at restaurants. In traditional communities, the making of nshima is a long process, which includes drying the maize, sorting the kernels, pounding it and then finally cooking it.

The types of relish eaten with nshima can be very simple, such as chibwabwa, or pumpkin leaves. Other names for the relish are katapa, kalembula and tente. The relish made with green vegetables is generally known as delele or thelele. A unique way to create relish relies on cooking with chidulo and kutendela. Chidulo is used in dishes made with green, leafy vegetables and also for wild mushrooms. The chidulo is made of burnt, dry banana leaves, bean stalks or maize stalks and leaves. The ashes are then collected, added to water and strained. The resulting liquid tastes like vinegar. Kutendela is a prepared groundnut powder made of pounded raw peanuts and is added to the chidulo sauce.

Ifisashi is another common food in Zambia. It is a type of stew, made with greens and peanuts and served with nshima. Ifisashi can be vegetarian or cooked meat can be added to the stew. Samp is also eaten in Zambia.

Kapenta, a small sardine from Lake Tanganyika, has been introduced in lakes in Zambia. The fish is caught and dried to be cooked later, or it can be cooked fresh. Gizzards are also a popular delicacy in Zambia.

Various insects are also eaten. These include stink bugs and mopani worms.

=== Street foods ===
Tute Ne Mbalala (Cassava with Groundnuts) is a Zambian street food that has a smoky, nutty flavor, and draws texture from cassava and an intense flavor from groundnuts. The Indian fried turnover samosas are eaten as a snack food in Zambia, prepared in a triangular shape and filled with minced meat and spiced vegetables like carrots and potatoes. Vitumbuwa (Puff-Puff), fried balls of wheat dough, are common Zambia and across Africa broadly. They are sold by street vendors and in markets. Chikanda (African Polony) is made from the dried and ground tubers of orchids mixed with peanuts and chilli that originates with the Bemba tribe in northeastern Zambia. It has a meaty flavor, and is eaten as a snack, dessert, side, and main course.

=== Beverages ===
Thobwa is a drink known for its carbohydrate content. While it is popular across Africa and thought to have originated there, it is especially favored in Zambia's eastern regions. Made from ingredients like sugar, water, and millet or sorghum flour, Thobwa is eaten for warm or cold for breakfast, and is considered refreshing and a good source of energy. Munkoyo is another indigenous Zambian beverage that is made from the roots of the munkoyo plant and corn flour. The roots are used in a number of Zambia's nutritional drinks. Its preparation involves thickening corn flour with boiling water, adding munkoyo roots, and then allowing the mixture to ferment overnight. Further fermentation follows after removing the roots, and is served alone or with meat or fish. Maheu resembles Thobwa but is differentiated by its base of corn flour. This mixture of corn flour, water, and sugar ferments over several days to create a non-alcoholic, tangy beverage that is served chilled.

=== Alcohol ===
In Zambia, traditional beer is made from maize. Individual villages once brewed their own recipes and it was shared communally. Maize beer is also brewed commercially in Lusaka, with Chibuku and Shake-Shake being popular brands. Other types of beer that are popular include Mosi and Rhino. The first Zambian beer festival was held on September 25, 2009, at the Barclays Sports Complex in Lusaka.

== History ==
The use of maize in dishes such as nsima or nshima happened during the latter half of the 20th century.

The Bemba people, who live in what is now Zambia, traditionally ate what was available depending on weather patterns. Bemba meals included a type of thick porridge made of millet called ubwali which was eaten with "relish" called umunani. Ubwali was eaten with nearly every meal. Umunani was most often a type of stew made with meat, fish, insects or vegetables. The Bemba preferred to eat ubwali with only one type of relish at a time. The stews made with meat and vegetables were cooked with salt and sometimes groundnuts. Generally, the Bemba did not eat raw food. Overall, Bemba cooking was fairly plain in taste and only occasionally acidic or spicy. Beer was an important part of social events for the Bemba people and beer was brewed often during harvest months.

Like the Bemba, the Chewa people also eat a porridge, called nsima, which is eaten with vegetables and used as a scoop.

The Tonga people of the region have traditionally eaten insects which are cooked or dried.

== See also ==
- Sylvia Banda
