= La Banda (disambiguation) =

La Banda is a city in the province of Santiago del Estero, Argentina

La Banda may also refer to:

- La Banda de Shilcayo District, one of fourteen districts of the province San Martín in Peru
- La Banda (American TV series), a Spanish-language singing competition
- La Banda (Mexican TV series), a comedy series

== See also ==
- La Banda del Golden Rocket, a 1991 Argentine TV series
- NG La Banda, a Cuban musical group founded by flutist José Luis "El Tosco" Cortés
- Banda (disambiguation)
