= Banda Ahenkro =

Town and District Capital in Bono Region, Ghana

- Town and District Capital
- Location in Ghana
- Coordinates: 8°09′55″N 2°21′20″W
- Country: Ghana
- Region: Bono region
- District: Banda District (Ghana)
- Elevation: 361 m (1,184 ft)

Population (2010)
  - Total: 2,795
- Demonym: Nafaa
- Time zone: GMT
  - Summer (DST): GMT

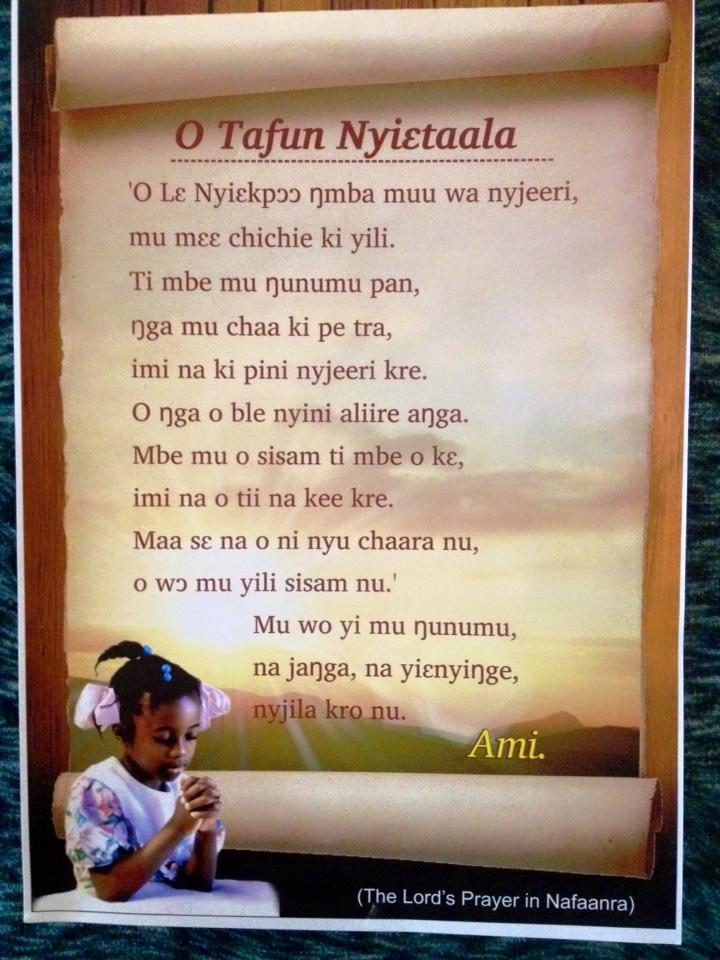
The Lord's Prayer in Nafaanra

Banda Ahenkro is a town located in the west-northern of Bono region, Ghana, near the border of Ivory Coast. Its geography provided a home for numerous groups seeking shelter from across West Africa during the slave trade era. The original name of the settlement was Serminakuu meaning groups of 'grasses'. This name was changed to Banda, which is a corruption of 'Woanda' meaning 'they did not sleep'. Ancestors of Banda Ahenkro were allies of the Asante kingdom during wars and they provided a military force that virtually refused to sleep during at-war times. This is because they were predominantly Muslims and were found praying throughout the night. Later, 'woanda' was also corrupted by the Bono neighbours to become Banda. The settlement evolved to become the chief town or 'Ahenkro' within a collection of Nafana communities.

Banda Ahenkro which is the district capital of Banda District was carved from Tain and forms part of the new districts and municipalities created in the year 2012 and were inaugurated at their various locations simultaneously on 28 June 2012.

The late president, H.E. J.E.A Mills, by an Executive Instrument (E.I) created 46 new districts. All the inaugurated and confirmed MMDAs established are operational with immediate effect in 2012hence bringing the total number of MMDAs to 216.

The district has a population of 45,000 with Banda Ahenkro having a population of 2,795 as at 2010 with males being 21,000 and females being 24,000. The population has been increasing over the years with a growth rate of 2.6%.

== Economy ==
Agriculture is the main occupation among the workforce of Banda Ahenkro.

== Transportation ==
Banda Ahenkro, the capital of Banda District is 126 kilometres away from Sunyani, the regional capital (approximately 1 hour 47 minutes’ drive by road). The town is connected by road to Wenchi and Bui and its hydro electric power, Bui Dam. Banda Ahenkro is not serviced by a railway station on the Ghana Railway Corporation.

== Communications ==
The town of Banda Ahenkro is outfitted with modern communication facilities which include, mobile phones, internet and e-mail services. These services are provided by telecommunication network providers MTN Ghana, Airtel Ghana, Vodafone Ghana and Tigo Ghana.

== Culture ==
The people of Banda Ahenkro celebrate 'Forjour' which is a popular festival that's being celebrated by the town. 'Forjour' is a yam festival celebrated in the month of October every year, the climax of the yam festival is the durbar of the king (Omanhene) through Banda traditional area. The festival is used as a means to remember their ancestors for protection and favour. It is also held to purify the area and allow its people to go into the traditional New Year with hope.

== Sports ==
Many residents of Banda traditional area follows the Banda Ahenkro-based sports team, Bandaman Football Club, which is currently playing in the second division league.

== Notable people ==
Banda Ahenkro is the home and birthplace of Ahmed Ibrahim, the current member of parliament for Banda District, Mr. Alexander Kofi Essien, lead counsel Greater Accra Regional House of Chiefs, and Asuma Banda and many others.

== Health ==
Banda Ahenkro (B/A), on 31 May 2005. GNA- The Ghana Health Service handed over a multi-million-cedi Health Centre to the people at Banda Ahenkro in Brong Ahafo.

Osabarima Okokyeredom Kwadwo Sito I, Omanhene of Banda Traditional Area, who received the keys to the facility from Mr Ebenezer Awuku, Estate Officer of the Ghana Health Service (GHS) in Sunyani in turn handed them over to the health personnel in-charge of the centre. The Omanhene commended the government and the GHS for the provision of the facility.

== Tourism ==
Tourists to Banda Ahenkro are attracted by the area's natural environment. Attractions include the Nyua Kpoo Mountain and the Sheli Kpoo cave which are potential tourist sites.
