= Ann B. Stahl =

Africanist archaeologist

Ann Brower Stahl is a U.S. Africanist archaeologist whose work focuses on the archaeology of the Banda area in Ghana, West Africa. She is Professor and Chair of the Department of Anthropology at the University of Victoria in British Columbia.

Stahl's textbook, African Archaeology: A Critical Introduction, won the inaugural Society for Africanist Archaeologists' Annual Book Prize in 2006, and she is the series editor for Springerbriefs in Archaeology: Contributions from Africa. In 2017 she gave the Patty Jo Watson Distinguished Lecture at the American Anthropological Association's annual meeting.

== Books ==
- Making History in Banda. Anthropological Visions of Africa's past. Cambridge: Cambridge University Press. 2001.
- (ed.) African Archaeology: A Critical Introduction. Oxford: Blackwell Press. 2005.
- (ed. with Andrew P. Roddick) Knowledge in Motion: Constellations of Learning across Time and Place. Amerind Seminar Series. Tucson: University of Arizona Press.

== See also ==
- Archaeology of Banda District (Ghana)
