= Banda (Ghana parliament constituency) =

Constituency in the Bono Region of Ghana

- constituency for the Parliament of Ghana
- District: Banda District
- Region: Bono Region of Ghana

Current constituency
- Created: 2012
- Party: National Democratic Congress (NDC)
- MP: Ahmed Ibrahim

Banda is a constituency of the parliament of Ghana, located in the Banda District in the Bono Region. Ahmed Ibrahim became first member of parliament for the constituency when he was elected on the ticket of the National Democratic Congress (NDC), winning 52.8% of the votes The constituency was among 45 constituencies created before the 2012 Ghanaian general election.

== Members of Parliament ==
First elected	Member	Party
Created 2012
2012	Ahmed Ibrahim	National Democratic Congress
2016	Ahmed Ibrahim	National Democratic Congress
2020	Ahmed Ibrahim	National Democratic Congress
2024	Ahmed Ibrahim	National Democratic Congress

== Elections ==
2020 Ghanaian general election: Banda:
Party	Candidate	Votes	%	±%
National Democratic Congress	Ahmed Ibrahim	8,277	50.3	−1.7
New Patriotic Party	Joe Danquah	8,195	49.8	+2.0
National Democratic Party	Yeboah Abbrey	0	0.0	−0.2
Great Consolidated Popular Party	Paul Nyankamago	0	0.0	–
Majority		82	0.5	
Turnout		16,472	86.0	
Registered electors		19,149		

2016 Ghanaian general election: Banda:
Party	Candidate	Votes	%	±%
National Democratic Congress	Ahmed Ibrahim	6,467	52.0	−0.8
New Patriotic Party	Joe Danquah	5,660	47.8	+1.5
National Democratic Party	Yeboah Abbrey	25	0.2	−0.7
Convention People's Party	Obimpeh Kwame	0	0.0	–
Majority		807	4.2	
Turnout				
Registered electors				

2012 Ghanaian general election: Banda:
Party	Candidate	Votes	%	±%
National Democratic Congress	Ahmed Ibrahim	5,645	52.8	
New Patriotic Party	Joe Danquah	4,950	46.3	
National Democratic Party	Frank Yeboah	104	0.9	
Majority		695	6.5	
Turnout				
Registered electors				

== See also ==
- List of Ghana Parliament constituencies
