= Cronquist =

Cronquist or Cronqvist are Swedish surnames. Notable people with these surnames include:

== People named Cronquist ==
- Anna Christina Cronquist (1807–1893), Swedish entrepreneur
- Arthur Cronquist (1919–1992), American botanist of Swedish descent
- Gustaf W. Cronquist (1878–1967), Swedish photographer
- Jo-Anne Cronquist (2004–), Swedish footballer

== People named Cronqvist ==
- Claes Cronqvist (born 1944), Swedish footballer
- Henrik Cronqvist, Swedish-American financial economist and corporate finance theorist
- Kjell Cronqvist (1920–2008), Swedish footballer, football manager and bandy player
- Lena Cronqvist (1938–2025), Swedish painter, graphic artist and sculptor

== See also ==
- Cronquist system, a taxonomic classification system of flowering plants, developed by Arthur Cronquist
- Mathias Cronqvist, a fictional character from Konami's Castlevania video game series, see Dracula (Castlevania)
