= Banda, Polavaram district =

Banda
- village
- Interactive map of Banda
- Location in Andhra Pradesh, India Banda (India)
- Coordinates: 17°47′24″N 81°49′05″E
- Country: India
- State: Andhra Pradesh
- District: Polavaram

Population (2011)
  - Total: 705

Languages
  - Official: Telugu
- Time zone: UTC+5:30 (IST)
- Postal code: 533 295

Banda is a village in Polavaram district in the state of Andhra Pradesh in India.

== Geography ==
Banda is located at 17.7540°N 81.8147°E.

== Demographics ==
As of Census 2011, Banda has population of 705 of which 322 were males while 383 were females. The population of children (aged 0–6) was 113 which makes up 16.03% of total population of village. Literacy rate of the village was 62.84%.

== Education ==
- Ascend International School
