= Bande =

Bande may refer to:

== People ==
- Bande Ali Mia (1906–1979), Bangladeshi poet
- Bande Nawaz, Indian centenarian
- Hassane Bandé (born 1998), Burkina Faso football player

== Places ==
- Bande, Belgium
- Bande, Niger
- Bande, Ourense, Galicia, Spain

== Other ==
- Bande dessinée, Franco-Belgian comics

== See also ==
- Banda (disambiguation)
