= Bandla =

Bandla (Telugu: బండ్ల) is a Telugu surname. Notable people with the surname include:

- Bandla Ganesh, Indian actor and director
- Bandla Krishna Mohan Reddy (born 1967), Indian politician
- Sirisha Bandla (born 1988), Indian-American astronaut

== See also ==
- Banda (surname)
