= Ministry of Local Government and Rural Development (Ghana) =

Government ministry of Ghana

Coordinates: 5.551931°N 0.197447°W

The Ministry of Local Government, Chieftaincy and Religious Affairs is the Government of Ghana Ministry responsible for the promotion of government policies and projects in Ghana. The ministry also promotes governance and balanced rural based development.

The Ministry is headed by the Minister of state appointed by the President of Ghana. The current Head of the ministry is Ahmed Ibrahim who assumed the position in January 2025.

== History ==
The Ministry of Local Government and Rural Development (MLGRD) has its administrative origins in the colonial period, starting with the introduction of Indirect Rule in 1878. At the time, British colonial officials relied on existing traditional systems by designating local chiefs as National Authorities to manage basic judicial duties and collect local revenue. The shift toward elected local governance began with the Local Government Ordinance of 1951, which established the first legal framework for autonomous, community based local administrative structures in Ghana.

The passage of PNDC LAW 207 in 1988 by the PNDC was a critical shift. The law decentralized Ghana's governance by moving political, administrative, and development powers from the central government to local levels. It established MMDAs and mandated that resource allocation and regional planning be managed by local representatives with direct knowledge of community needs

With the start of the Fourth Republic in 1993, the ministry was formally established under the Civil Service Ministries Instrument. Kwamena Ahowi was appointed as the first sector minister in this new constitutional era and served from 1993 to 2001. Ahowi is largely credited with developing and strengthening the structural framework for modern local governance in Ghana. He ensured that the decentralization provisions outlined in chapter 20 of the 1992 Constitution were effectively put into practice across all districts in the country.

Over the years, the ministry's scope of responsibilities has gradually broadened to align with evolving national priorities, including the integration of the country's primary environmental health functions. Under the Ministry of Local Government, Chieftaincy and Religious Affairs (MLGCRA), the current minister, Ahmed Ibrahim, manages a portfolio that combines local infrastructure development with traditional chieftaincy and religious matters. This institutional realignment seeks to link community level public projects directly with traditional and cultural leaders in order to enhance citizen participation

== Functions of the Ministry ==
- Planning, monitoring and assessing policies, programs, and projects aimed at reforming local government systems.
- Developing policies to establish an effective decentralized public administration structure at the regional, district, and sub-district levels.
- Enhancing efficiency in local government operations.
- Encouraging civil society involvement in governance and development through community-driven initiatives.
- Supporting faster development in rural areas.
- Assisting in the distribution of resources for development at the local level.
- Promoting well- planned growth of human settlements in both urban and rural development areas.
- Overseeing the registration of births and deaths to create reliable data for development planning.
- Provide advice to government on issues related to local governance.

== Agencies of the Ministry ==
- Office of the Head of Local Government Service (OHLGS)
- Metropolitan, Municipal and District Assemblies (MMDAs)
- Regional Co-ordinating Councils (RCCs)
- Department of Community Development
- Department of Social Welfare
- Births and Deaths Registry
- Town and Country Planning Department
- Environmental Health and Sanitation Directorate
- Works Department

== Laws passed ==
- Local Governance Act, 2016(Act 936) an act to guide local governance in line with the constitution. It provides for the creation of a Local Government Service and the management of the District Assemblies Common Fund. The Act also establishes a National Development Planning System, outlines and regulates planning processes for District Assemblies, ensures the coordination, facilitation, monitoring and oversight of internal audit functions within District Assemblies, including other related matters.
- Local Governance (Amendment) Act, 2017(Act 940) a key amendment passed to refine administrative powers and make minor structural updates to the principal 2016 law
- Registration of Births and Deaths Act, 2020(Act 1027) this law, administered by the Ministry through the Births and Deaths Registry, modernized and decentralized civil registration systems within local authorities.
- Local Government Act, 1993 (Act 462) the foundational law that established the assembly system, later consolidated into Act 936
- Local Government Service Act, 2003 (Act 656) created a distinct, professional bureaucratic body known as the local Government Service to manage local administration personal separate from the Civil Service.
- District Assembly Elections (Amendment) Acts legislative amendments introduced periodically, including those in 2010, to regulate the non-partisan electoral processes at the local and unit committee levels.
- Local Governance (Consultations) Regulations, 2020(L.I. 2406) Governs public sanitation standards, municipal waste facility control, and community engagement protocols across assemblies.
- Local Government (Departments of District Assemblies) (Commencement) Instrument, 2009 (L.I. 1961) Formally transferred personnel from central government ministries down to decentralized departments under the MMDAs
- MMDA Establishment Instruments legal instruments issued continuously by successive ministers to officially declare, split, or upgrade districts into Municipalities or Metropolises. An example is the Guan District Assembly Instrument of 2020

== Heads of the Ministry (Fourth republic) ==
| NAMES | DURATION | PROFESSION | POLITICAL PARTY | DEPUTY |
|---|---|---|---|---|
| Kwamena Ahwoi | 1993- -2001 | Politician | NDC | Cecilia Johnson |
| Cecilia Johnson | 2001 | Politician | NDC | |
| Kwadwo Baah-Wiredu | 2001-2003 | Charted Accountant, Politician, Public Servant | NPP | Hajia Alima Mahama |
| Kwadwo Agyei Darko | 2003-2005 | Entreprenuer | NPP | Issah Ketewu Capt. Effah Dartey |
| Charles Binipom Bintim | 2005 | Educationist | NPP | Abraham Dwuma Odoom |
| Stephen Asamoah Boateng | 2006-2007 | Politician | NPP | Kofi Poku-Adusei |
| Kwadwo Adjei-Darko | 2007-2009 | Educationist | NPP | Abraham Dwuma Odoom |
| Joseph Yieleh Chireh | 2009-2011 | Pharmacist, Barrister, Diplomat, Politician | NDC | Elvis Afriyie Ankrah |
| Samuel Ofosu- Ampofo | 2012-2013 | Educationist, Mechanical Technician Engineer, Public Administrator | NDC | Elvis Afriyie Ankrah Aquinas Tawiah Quansah Stephen Ackah |
| Akwasi Oppong Fosu | 2013-2014 | Public Policy Analyst | NDC | Emmanuel Kwadwo Agyekum Edwin Nii Lante Vanderpuye |
| Julius Debrah | 2014-2015 | Politician | NDC | Emmanuel Kwadwo Agyekum Edwin Nii Lante Vanderpuye |
| Collins Dauda | 2015-2017 | Consultant | NDC | Emmanuel Kwaswo Agyekum Edwin Nii Lante Vanderpuye |
| Alima Mahama | 2017-2021 | Lawyer | NPP | Osei Bonsu Amoah Augustine Collins Ntim Kwasi Boateng Adjei |
| Daniel Botwe | 2021-2024 | ICT specialist | NPP | Osei Bonsu Amoah Agustine Collins Ntim Martin Adjei-Mensah Korsah |
| Martin Adjei Korsah | 2024-2025 | Manager, Administrator, HR Practitioner | NPP | Vincent Ekow Assafuah Abdulai Abanga |
| Ahmed Ibrahim | 2025-Present | Politician | NDC | Rita Naa Odoley Sowah |
