= Blind Lake, Utah =

Lake in the state of Utah, United States

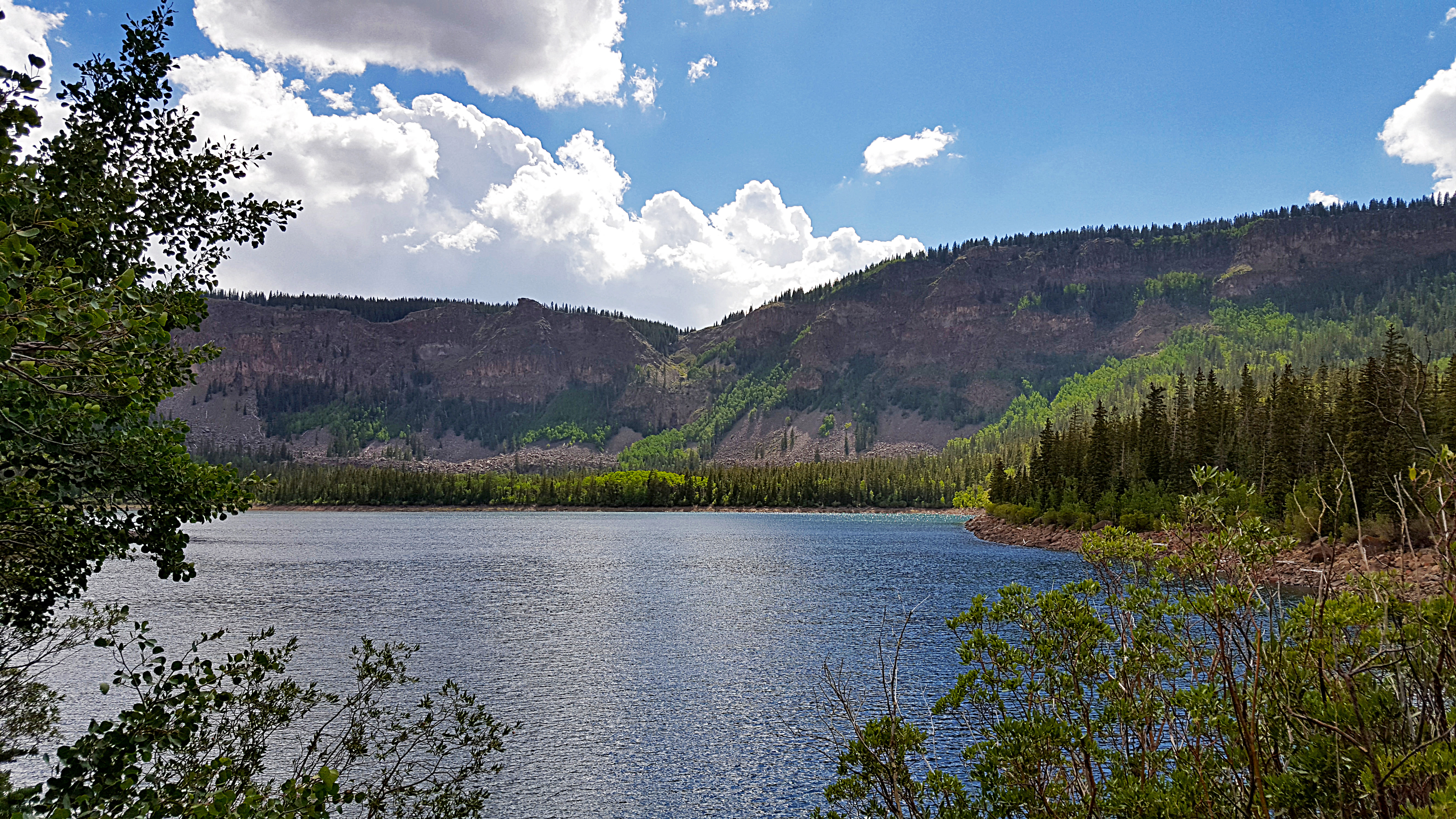
- Blind Lake

- Location within Utah Location within the United States
- Location: Wayne County, Utah, United States
- Coordinates: 38°10′38″N 111°26′33″W
- Basin countries: United States
- Max. length: 0.5 mi (0.80 km)
- Max. width: 0.3 mi (0.48 km)
- Surface area: 52 acres (21 ha)
- Max. depth: 52 ft (16 m)
- Surface elevation: 10,250 ft (3,120 m)

Blind Lake is a high alpine lake (elevation approximately 10,250 ft or 3,120 m) located on Boulder Mountain within Dixie National Forest. It is the largest and deepest lake on Boulder Mountain and was created as a reservoir in the early 1900s.

Blind Lake holds rainbow trout, brook trout, arctic grayling, splake and cutthroat trout.

The nearest town is Torrey, 10 miles to the north (16 km). A larger community, Richfield, is 75 miles to the west.
