= Kumbulani Banda =

Zimbabwean footballer (born 1989)

Kumbulani Banda (born 21 February 1989) is a footballer, who plays for Bantu Tshintsha Guluva Rovers F.C.

== Career ==
Banda began playing football with Bantu Tshintsha Guluva Rovers F.C., and went on six-month loan to Dynamos in early 2010. The left back left in summer 2010 Dynamos F.C. and returned to Zimbabwe Premier Soccer League rival Bantu Tshintsha Guluva Rovers F.C.
