= Sead Banda =

Montenegrin footballer

Personal information
- Full name: Sead Banda
- Date of birth: 16 June 1990 (age 36)
- Place of birth: Nikšić, SFR Yugoslavia
- Height: 1.82 m (5 ft 11 1/2 in)
- Position: Forward

Youth career
- Sutjeska Nikšić
- Lecce
- Red Star Belgrade

Senior career*
Years	Team	Apps	(Gls)
2008–2009	OFK Beograd	1	(0)
2009–2011	Sutjeska	24	(1)
2010	→ Čelik Nikšić (loan)	7	(0)
2011	Bokelj	27	(1)
2012	Dečić Tuzi	11	(0)
2012	Bokelj	11	(1)
2013	Bosna Visoko	3	(0)
2013–2014	Rudar Kakanj	1	(0)

International career^{‡}
2007–2008	Montenegro U-19	8	(0)
2008	Montenegro U-21	1	(0)
- * Club domestic league appearances and goals as of 14 August 2013 ‡ National team caps and goals as of 14 August 2013

Sead Banda (Serbian Cyrillic: Сеад Банда; born 16 June 1990) is a Montenegrin professional football striker playing with FK Rudar Kakanj in the First League of the Federation of Bosnia and Herzegovina.

== Club career ==
Born in Nikšić, he started playing in the youth squad of FK Sutjeska Nikšić, but soon he will move abroad, first to Italian where he joined US Lecce and then Serbian side, and 1991 European and World Champions, Red Star Belgrade.

In 2008, he signed a 4-year contract with OFK Belgrade. Despite making his senior debut with OFK in the Serbian SuperLiga, at the end of the season he returned to Montenegro to play with his home town club FK Sutjeska Nikšić in the Montenegrin First League.

He stayed with Sutjeska for the following couple of seasons, before moving to another Montenegrin top flight club, FK Bokelj during summer 2011. After only six months, during the winter break, he moved to FK Dečić.

In summer 2012, after the relegation of Dečić, he returned to FK Bokelj. During the winter break of the 2012–13 season, he moved to Bosnia and joined second-level club NK Bosna Visoko. In summer 2013 he moved to FK Rudar Kakanj.

== International career ==
Sead has made part of Montenegrin under-19 and under-21 teams.
