= Ascend International School =

School in Mumbai

Coordinates: 19°4′11.37″N 72°51′3.96″E

- Mumbai; India

Information
- School type: International coeducational Private non-profit day school
- Founded: 2011
- Founder: Neil Nitin Mukesh
- School board: IB, IGCSE, NIOS
- Age: 3 years to 19 years
- Education system: International Baccalaureate
- Affiliation: University Child Development School (Seattle)

Ascend International School in Bandra East, Mumbai, India, is a coeducational international Pre K to 12th grade day school established in 2011 and managed by the non-profit Kasegaon Education Society. The International Baccalaureate program and problem-based learning, as well as the educational philosophy of the University Child Development School define the school's curriculum.

== Description ==
Designed by architect Don Carlson, Ascend International School is located on 2.5-acre campus accommodating 350 students. The academic building has primary and secondary sections with 35 classrooms, mobile smart boards, and a 5,000 sq. ft. library with 9,000 print volumes, journals and electronic resources. There are also art studios, music rooms, science laboratories and a yoga/dance studio, in addition to a multipurpose auditorium. Sports facilities include, "a football field, a basketball court and a field for track & field sports along with a 25-metre rooftop swimming pool".

Education World India said, "Ascend’s distinguishing features are its highly qualified faculty, well-designed curriculum tailor made for all learning styles, and contemporary academic and co-curricular facilities." According to its November 2019 analytics, "...Ascend is ranked among the country’s Top 10 (#7) international day schools... #3 in Mumbai West. The school is also ranked #1 in Mumbai West for individual attention to students and infrastructure provision, #2 for teacher welfare & development and #3 in competence of faculty and co-curricular education."

The founding CEO is Aditya Patil. The school is affiliated with the Central Board of Secondary Education of India.

== History ==
Ascend International School was founded as a non-profit English-medium school in 2011 by the Kasegaon Education Society (KES) in cooperation with the University Child Development School in Seattle, Washington. It is located in the Bandra-Kurla Complex on the western coast of India, close to the Arabian Sea.

The school has been built on a 10,000 square meter area allotted to Kasegaon Education Society in May 2008. According to The Indian Express, the society "has now set up the Ascend International School on a portion and has also got permission for commercial exploitation of 30 per cent built-up area". The Indian Express had investigated "concessional" prices for land allotments given to former government officials to build schools. In 2008 the price to KES, for example, was Rs 22.5 lakh, for land worth Rs 52 crore at that time. The newspaper found, "KES did not comply with the two-year deadline for completing construction work."

The first primary grade students were admitted in August 2012. Each successive year, one more grade has been introduced, implementing a plan to allow teachers time to focus on one new level of instruction annually. In its first year of operation, students were between the ages of 3 and 8, and the school's new librarian said she kept "focus on gathering books that will support the school’s international population", with plans "to build a strong foundational collection".

In August 2015, middle school students were admitted and grades eleven and twelve were scheduled to begin in 2020.

The cost of annual tuition and fees at Ascend can be "up to two million rupees ($30,000)", according to Nikhil Hemrajani of BBC News Tiếng Việt. Under the 2009 Right of Children to Free and Compulsory Education Act (RTE), "All unaided non-minority schools in the city are expected to reserve 25% of their seats at the entry level for students from economically weaker sections." One 8-year-old child had been assigned to Ascend International School in 2020 by the official lottery process, but the school denied his admission. The school also did not respond to a notice to admit the child from the ward-level education officer, who threatened to cancel its recognition under Section 18 (3) of the Act in case of non-compliance. As of June 22, 2021, the case had not been resolved.

According to the Mumbai Mirror, admission to schools with the IB curriculum does not depend on "...fixed criteria to get in (unlike a percentage requirement that’s required for admission to local colleges), and so much is based on how you perform in the interview and the admission test, parents can’t be sure where their children will find admission". Schools with strong reputations schedule interviews in January, but "...schools that can’t afford to be cocksure – Ascend International School in Bandra, for instance, a relatively new IBDP player that’s quickly gaining popularity" have to screen applicants as early as August. They "don’t want to be left with empty seats that they may then be compelled to offer to weaker students."

== Curriculum ==
Ascend International School offers the International Baccalaureate curriculum, and is also aligned with the educational philosophy of the University Child Development School.

The International Baccalaureate program "offers 4 educational courses (for different grades/classes):

- The IB Primary Years Programme (PYP) for children aged between 3 to 12.
- The IB Middle Years Programme (MYP) for students aged between 11 to 16.
- The IB Diploma Programme for students aged between 15 to 19.
- The IB Career-related-programme for students aged between 15 to 19."
