= Björn Westerberg =

Swedish football manager

Managerial career
- Years: Team
- 1979–1980: Åtvidabergs FF
- 1983–1984: IFK Göteborg
- 1985–1986: Djurgårdens IF

Björn Westerberg (10 February 1945 – 15 April 2014) was a Swedish football manager. He was Djurgårdens IF manager in 1985–86.
