= Sylvia Banda =

Zambian restaurateur

- Born: 1962 (age 63–64); Zambia
- Education: Fairview College
- Occupations: Restaurateur, social entrepreneur, business executive
- Organization: Sylva Group of Companies
- Known for: Promoting Zambian indigenous food; training over 60,000 smallholder farmers
- Title: Managing Director, Sylva Group; Chairperson, Africa Harvest (Zambia)
- Spouse: Hector Banda
- Awards: Ashoka Fellow (2012)

Sylvia Banda (born 1962) is a Zambian business woman, restaurateur and social entrepreneur. She is an Ashoka fellow. Banda promotes local food use, choosing ingredients for her restaurant from local and small-scale farms. She started her own business, Sylva Professional Catering in 1986. By 2009, she had 16 restaurants in Lusaka. In 2014, she invested $105,000 in US dollars to open a food processing plant in Zambia.

== Career ==
Banda has also served as the chair of the Zambia Chapter of the African Women Entrepreneurship Programme (AWEP). Lusaka Voice calls Banda "one of Zambia's most recognisable entrepreneurs." Banda and her husband, Hector, publish Zambian cuisine recipes in a weekly Times of Zambia column called "Zambian Dishes with Sylvia Catering." Banda also trains women on how to preserve local foods. She has a nonprofit organization, Sylva Food Solutions (SFS) to help local farmers increase business.

Banda works with the University of Zambia to offer an agriculture-based training programme that promotes innovative thinking as well as traditional foods and recipes.
