= Aquarius Plateau =

Coordinates: 38°05′N 111°30′W

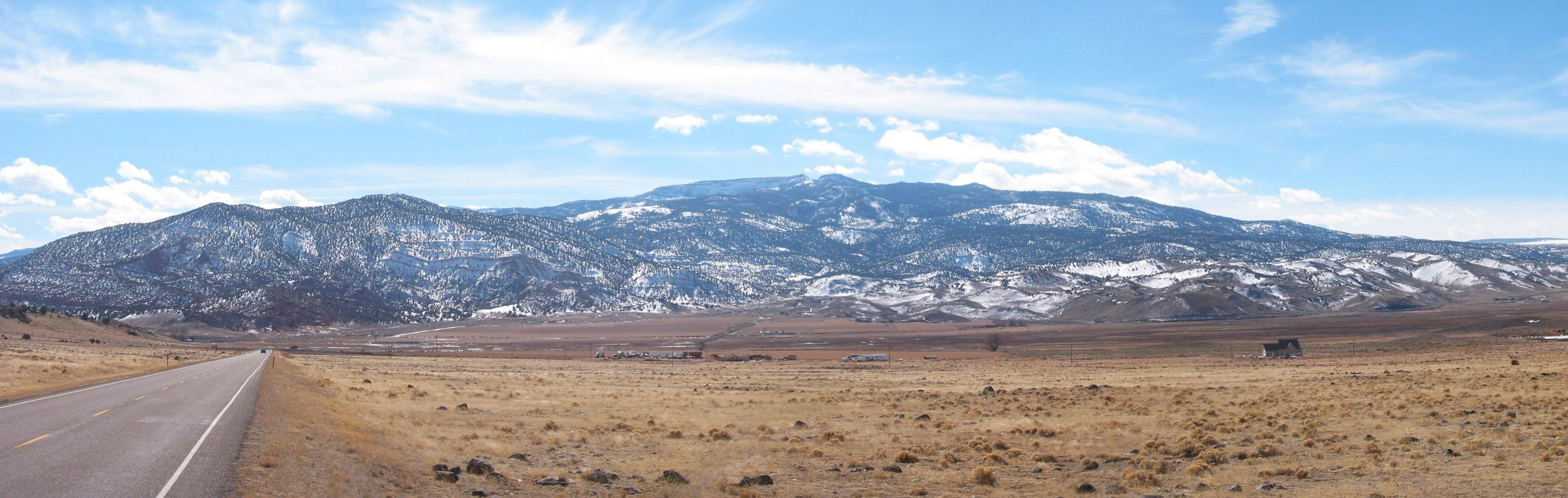
Boulder Mountain (11,328 feet (3,452.8 m)) on the Aquarius Plateau.

The Aquarius Plateau is a physiographic region in the High Plateaus Section of the Colorado Plateau Province. It is located within Garfield and Wayne counties in south-central Utah.

== Geography ==
The plateau, a tectonic uplift on the much larger Colorado Plateau landform, is the highest in Utah. It is over 900 square miles (2330 km^{2}) of mostly forested highland, much of which is part of Dixie National Forest.

It has over 50,000 acres (200 km^{2}) of rolling hilly terrain above 11,000 feet (3350 m). The plateau includes Boulder Mountain which peaks at 11,328 feet (3,452.8 m) at Bluebell Knoll.

=== Parks ===
Parks and protected areas on the Aquarius Plateau or its perimeter include Bryce Canyon National Park, Grand Staircase–Escalante National Monument, Capitol Reef National Park, and Dixie National Forest.

== Flora ==
The region is home to rare and endemic plants, including the Aquarius Penstemon and the Aquarius Plateau Paintbrush (Castilleja aquariensis).

== Section diagram ==
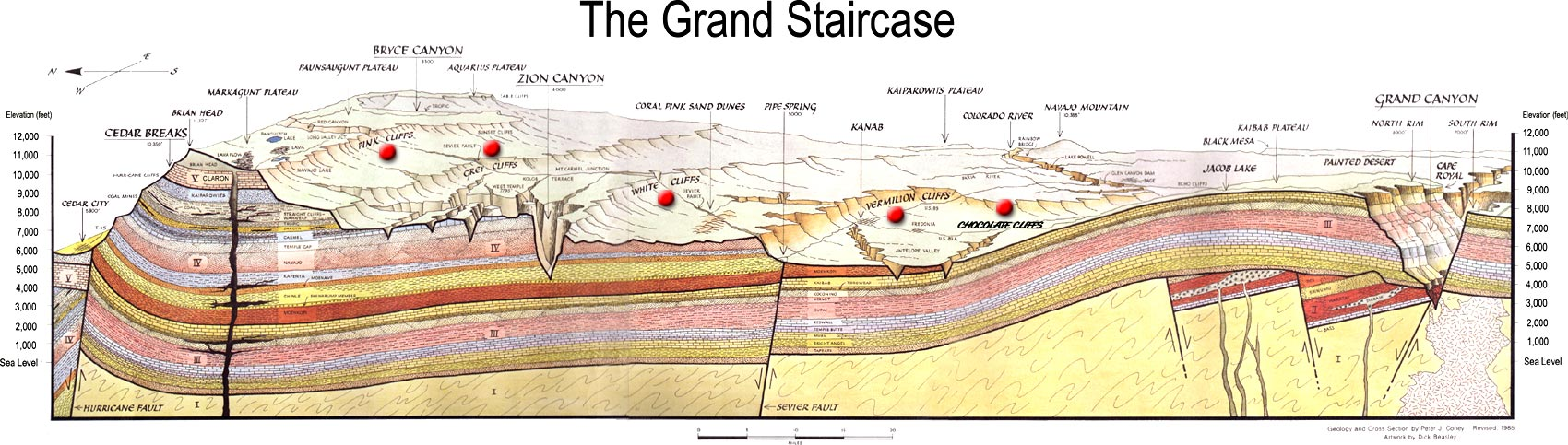
The Grand Staircase, with Aquarius Plateau on its northern edge

== See also ==
- Markagunt Plateau
- Cedar Breaks National Monument
- United States physiographic region
