= Lennart Wass =

Swedish football manager

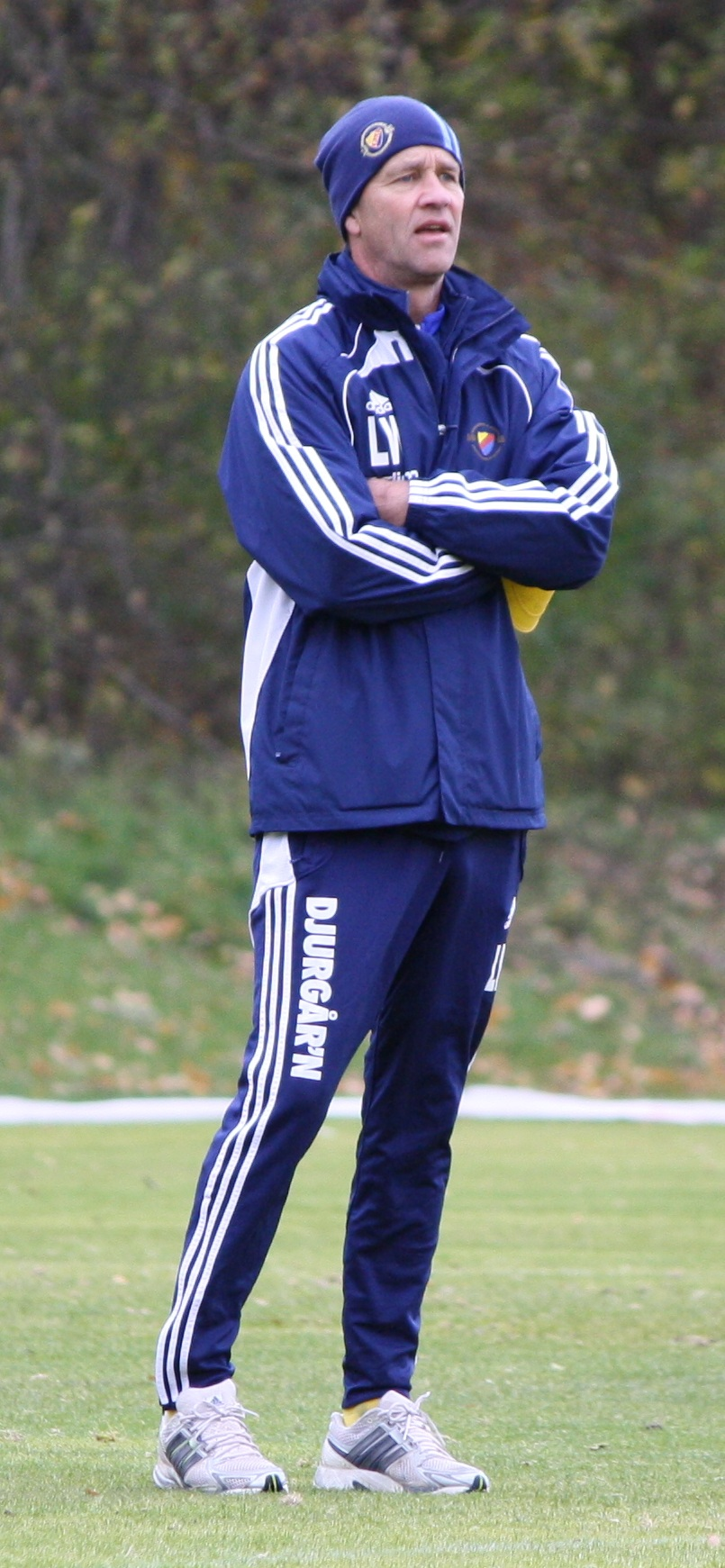

Personal information
- Date of birth: 1953 (age 72–73)
- Place of birth: Stockholm, Sweden

Managerial career
- Years: Team
- 1990–1991: Djurgårdens IF
- 2009–2011: Djurgårdens IF

Lennart Wass (born 4 January 1953) is a Swedish football manager and former player. He co-managed Swedish side Djurgårdens IF along with Carlos Banda during the 2010 Allsvenskan and the beginning of the 2011 Allsvenskan.
