= Danny Banda =

Canadian football player

Profile
- Positions: Halfback, Linebacker

Personal information
- Born: c. 1938 (age 87–88)
- Listed height: 5 ft 9 in (1.75 m)
- Listed weight: 160 lb (73 kg)

Career history
- 1958–1962: Saskatchewan Roughriders

Donald "Danny" Banda (born c. 1938) is a retired Canadian football player who played for the Saskatchewan Roughriders.
