= Banda TV =

- Broadcast area: Angola; Mozambique

Programming
- Language: Portuguese

Ownership
- Owner: MAD
- Key people: Manuel Domingos

History
- Launched: 28 November 2013

Banda TV, also known as Banda TV Internacional, is an Angolan private satellite television channel available over the DStv platform in both Angola and Mozambique. Founded in 2013, it is an entertainment channel.

== History ==
Banda TV started broadcasting on DStv on 28 November 2013 and was publicly presented a few days later on 3 December. Its founder was Manuel Domingos, also owner of Afro Music Channel and its sister channel Afro Music Concerts. At launch, it had three local programs: Bola ao Centro, Resenha Informativa and Você na Banda. Three launch programs were being planned: Querida Ary with singer Ary, Makongo with William King of Love and Mwangolé with singer C4 Pedro.

On 12 September 2017, the channel converted to high definition and opened its studios that day for members of the press.

In July 2023, it unveiled new programs: Kamundongo (private lives of Angolan celebrities), Ponto de Encontro (interviews with life stories), PodCast na Tela (face-to-face interview with two personalities on controversial topics), Swag (dancing program for the youth), Hora VIP (news on national and international celebrities) and new seasons of international programs, Faustão na Band and America's Got Talent.

In 2026, the channel faced a labor crisis and suspended most of its programs, with Show da Banda being among the few programs still on air. As of August, it had been facing four months of unpaid wages. It was also suggested that the acquisition of Multichoice, DStv's parent company, by the French Canal+ Group, led to "profound alterations", as decision-making for the company was now being done in France instead of South Africa. Moreover, the contract with DStv expired in February but was only renewed in June.
