= Ahmed Ibrahim (Ghanaian politician) =

Ghanaian politician

The Honourable Ahmed Ibrahim
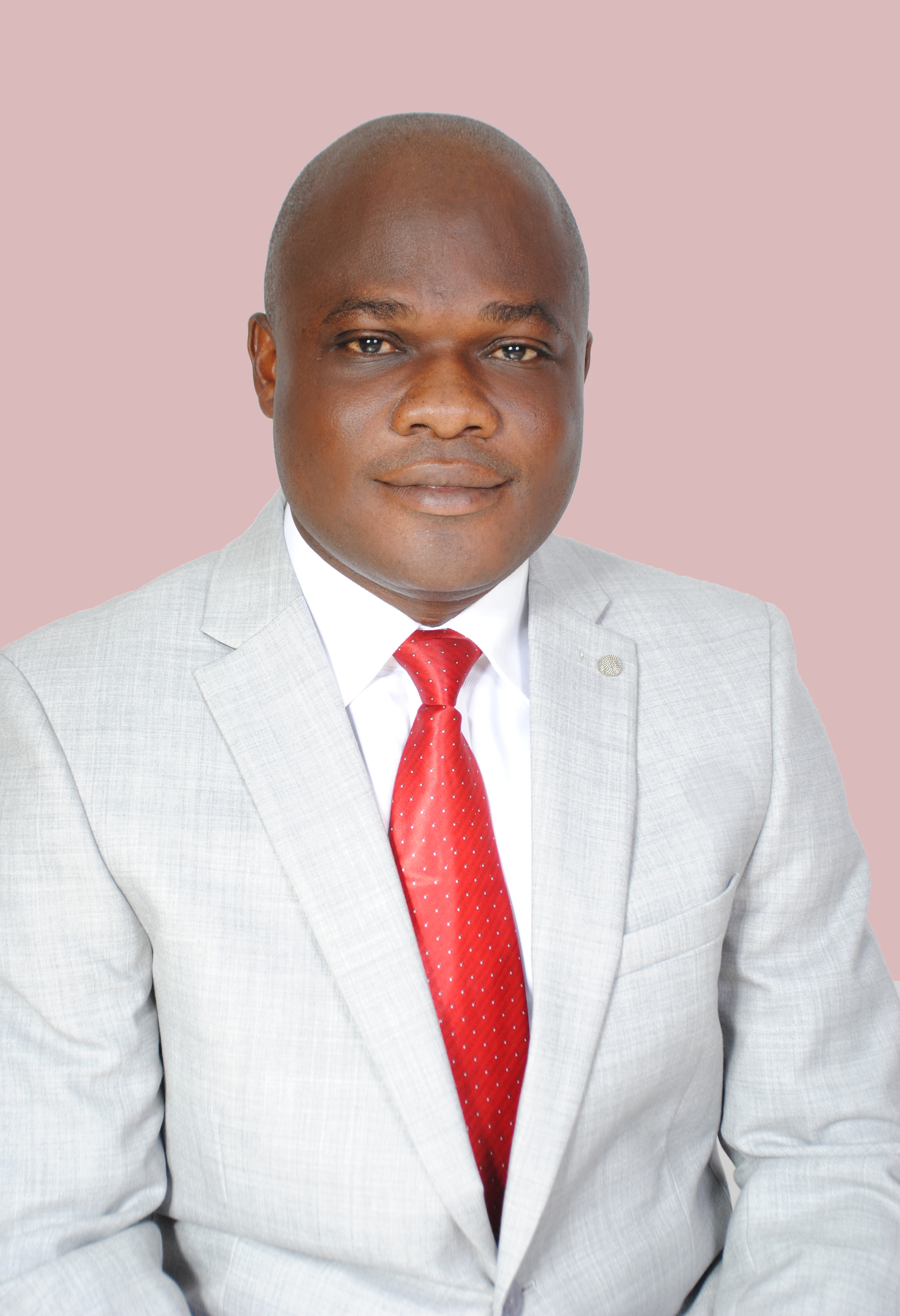

MP for Banda Constituency
- Incumbent
- Assumed office 7 January 2009
- President: Nana Akufo-Addo

Minister for Ministry of Local Government and Rural Development (Ghana)
- Incumbent
- Assumed office February 2025
- President: John Mahama
- Preceded by: Dan Botwe

Personal details
- Born: 6 May 1974 (age 52) Banda Ahenkro
- Party: National Democratic Congress
- Children: One
- Education: University of Ghana, Ghana Institute of Management and Public Administration
- Profession: Chief Executive Officer
- Committees: Special Budget Committee; Communications Committee; Local Government and Rural Development Committee; Business Committee

Ahmed Ibrahim is a Ghanaian politician and member of the Seventh Parliament of the Fourth Republic of Ghana representing the Banda Constituency in the Bono Region on the ticket of the National Democratic Congress. He was the Deputy Minority Chief Whip in the Parliament of Ghana until his nomination as Minister of Local Government, Chieftaincy and Religious Affairs.

== Early life and education ==
Ibrahim was born on 6 May 1974, in Banda Ahenkro in the Bono Region of Ghana. Ibrahim studied at the University of Ghana where he received a bachelor's degree in Political Science and Philosophy in 2001.He also earned a Master of Business Administration degree, with specialization in Finance from the Ghana Institute of Management and Public Administration in 2019

== Career ==
He was the chief executive officer of Flamingo Publications (Ghana) Limited.

== Politics ==
Ibrahim began his political career in 2009 after being declared the winner of the 2008 Ghanaian General Elections for his constituency. He was then elected into the 5th Parliament of the 4th Republic of Ghana on 7 January 2009. After the completion of his first term in office, Ibrahim decided to run for another term in 2013 and defeated Joe Danquah to retain his seat. In 2015 he contested and won the NDC parliamentary primaries for Banda constituency in the Bono Region of Ghana. He won this parliamentary seat during the 2016 Ghanaian general elections by getting 6,167 votes representing 52.03% against his opponent 5,660 votes representing 47.76%.

He was re-elected member of parliament for the 9th parliament on the ticket of the National Democratic Congress. He was appointed the minister in charge of Ministry of Local Government and Rural Development (Ghana) by John Mahama.

=== Committees ===
Ibrahim is a member of the Special Budget Committee; a member of the Communications Committee; a member of the Local Government and Rural Development Committee; and a member of the Business Committee.

== Personal life ==
Ibrahim is a Christian. He is married with one child.
