= Boulder Mountain (Utah) =

Mountain in the American state of Utah

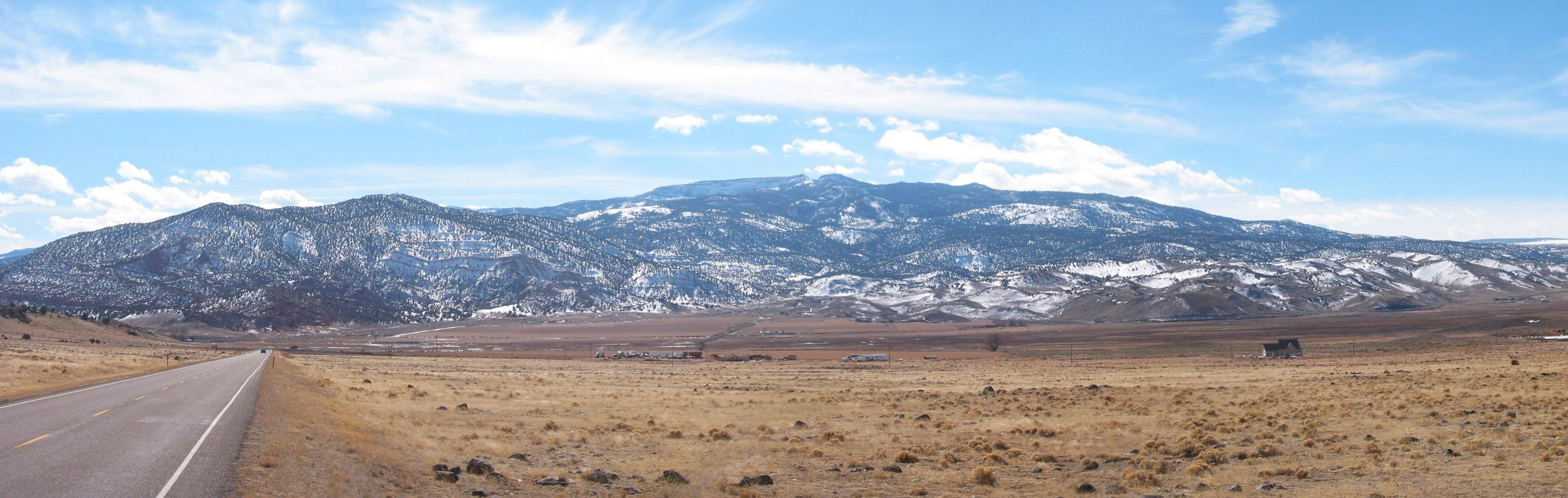
- Boulder Mountain from the west alongside Route 24

Highest point
- Peak: Bluebell Knoll
- Elevation: 11,317 ft (3,449 m)
- Prominence: 2,930 ft (890 m)
- Listing: Utah county high points (1st)
- Coordinates: 38°07′30″N 111°30′03″W

Geography
- Location within Utah
- Country: United States
- State: Utah
- Counties: Wayne; Garfield
- Parent range: Aquarius Plateau
- Topo map: USGS Blind Lake

Climbing
- Easiest route: Highway 12

Boulder Mountain (also known as Bluebell Knoll and Boulder Top) in Utah, United States makes up half of the Aquarius Plateau of South Central Utah in Wayne and Garfield counties. The mountain rises to the west of Capitol Reef National Park and consists of steep slopes and cliffs with over 50,000 acres (200 km^{2}) of rolling forest and meadowlands on the top. The mountain has a nearly flat summit of roughly 70 square miles. The mountain is the highest timbered plateau in North America and is part of the Dixie National Forest.

== Highway 12 ==
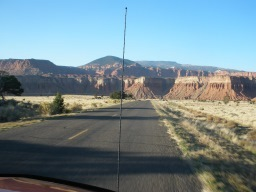
Boulder Mountain Drive

Utah Scenic Byway 12 traverses the eastern side of the mountain from Torrey through Boulder and on to Escalante. A series of unpaved backcountry roads and jeep trails provide access to the top during the brief snow-free time, usually only a few months from July to September. These jeep trails were originally created as the main route for wagons traveling between Escalante and Boulder. The trail was upgraded to a road in 1920 when the Ohio Drilling Company created a route to Wagon Box Mesa. A famous road on the mountain, Hell's Backbone Road, forks from Scenic Byway 12. Hell's Backbone then runs west toward Posey Lake/Pine Creek Road. The road eventually winds back to the town of Escalante, which allows travelers to complete a 38-mile loop.

== Climate ==
Boulder Mountain has a subalpine climate (Köppen Dfc), bordering on an Alpine climate (Köppen ET) at the highest elevations around Bluebell Knoll.

Climate data for Bluebell Knoll (Boulder Mountain) 38.1566 N, 111.5096 W, Elevation: 11,289 ft (3,441 m) (1991–2020 normals)
Month	Jan	Feb	Mar	Apr	May	Jun	Jul	Aug	Sep	Oct	Nov	Dec	Year
Mean daily maximum °F (°C)	29.7 (−1.3)	30.3 (−0.9)	35.8 (2.1)	40.9 (4.9)	49.6 (9.8)	61.9 (16.6)	67.2 (19.6)	64.9 (18.3)	58.0 (14.4)	47.3 (8.5)	36.3 (2.4)	29.3 (−1.5)	45.9 (7.7)
Daily mean °F (°C)	18.9 (−7.3)	18.7 (−7.4)	23.8 (−4.6)	28.7 (−1.8)	37.2 (2.9)	48.1 (8.9)	53.9 (12.2)	52.3 (11.3)	45.5 (7.5)	35.4 (1.9)	25.7 (−3.5)	18.8 (−7.3)	33.9 (1.1)
Mean daily minimum °F (°C)	8.1 (−13.3)	7.1 (−13.8)	11.9 (−11.2)	16.6 (−8.6)	24.9 (−3.9)	34.4 (1.3)	40.7 (4.8)	39.7 (4.3)	33.0 (0.6)	23.5 (−4.7)	15.1 (−9.4)	8.2 (−13.2)	21.9 (−5.6)
Average precipitation inches (mm)	2.12 (54)	2.31 (59)	2.46 (62)	2.47 (63)	2.21 (56)	0.99 (25)	2.79 (71)	2.60 (66)	2.22 (56)	2.51 (64)	2.05 (52)	1.72 (44)	26.45 (672)
Source: PRISM Climate Group

Donkey Reservoir is high up on the northeastern slope of Boulder Mountain. Donkey Reservoir also has a subalpine climate (Köppen Dfc) but with higher average temperatures, due to its lower elevation.

Climate data for Donkey Reservoir, Utah, 2004–2020 normals: 9800ft (2987m)
Month	Jan	Feb	Mar	Apr	May	Jun	Jul	Aug	Sep	Oct	Nov	Dec	Year
Record high °F (°C)	55 (13)	55 (13)	62 (17)	68 (20)	74 (23)	83 (28)	83 (28)	82 (28)	81 (27)	68 (20)	61 (16)	53 (12)	83 (28)
Mean maximum °F (°C)	47.4 (8.6)	47.8 (8.8)	54.9 (12.7)	60.8 (16.0)	68.5 (20.3)	78.8 (26.0)	80.6 (27.0)	76.8 (24.9)	72.3 (22.4)	63.0 (17.2)	55.3 (12.9)	48.4 (9.1)	81.2 (27.3)
Mean daily maximum °F (°C)	33.7 (0.9)	34.0 (1.1)	41.2 (5.1)	46.6 (8.1)	55.2 (12.9)	68.6 (20.3)	72.7 (22.6)	69.5 (20.8)	61.9 (16.6)	49.6 (9.8)	40.9 (4.9)	32.5 (0.3)	50.5 (10.3)
Daily mean °F (°C)	19.9 (−6.7)	20.7 (−6.3)	27.7 (−2.4)	33.4 (0.8)	41.7 (5.4)	53.5 (11.9)	58.1 (14.5)	55.6 (13.1)	48.1 (8.9)	36.9 (2.7)	28.1 (−2.2)	19.6 (−6.9)	36.9 (2.7)
Mean daily minimum °F (°C)	6.1 (−14.4)	7.4 (−13.7)	14.2 (−9.9)	20.2 (−6.6)	28.1 (−2.2)	38.3 (3.5)	43.5 (6.4)	41.8 (5.4)	34.2 (1.2)	24.3 (−4.3)	15.2 (−9.3)	6.7 (−14.1)	23.3 (−4.8)
Mean minimum °F (°C)	−16.1 (−26.7)	−13.7 (−25.4)	−7.6 (−22.0)	2.5 (−16.4)	14.2 (−9.9)	24.8 (−4.0)	34.8 (1.6)	31.9 (−0.1)	20.6 (−6.3)	6.3 (−14.3)	−6.9 (−21.6)	−15.7 (−26.5)	−19.1 (−28.4)
Record low °F (°C)	−29 (−34)	−21 (−29)	−15 (−26)	−3 (−19)	5 (−15)	21 (−6)	29 (−2)	26 (−3)	13 (−11)	−11 (−24)	−19 (−28)	−26 (−32)	−29 (−34)
Average precipitation inches (mm)	1.47 (37)	1.55 (39)	1.80 (46)	1.87 (47)	1.59 (40)	0.74 (19)	2.26 (57)	2.25 (57)	1.90 (48)	1.94 (49)	1.51 (38)	1.32 (34)	20.2 (511)
Source 1: XMACIS2
Source 2: NOAA (Precipitation)

== Fishing ==
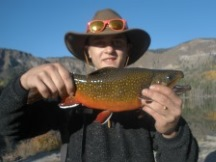
Fish from the area

Boulder Mountain is routinely held in high regard by Utahns as a fisherman's paradise. Fishing opportunities began on the mountain in the 1950s when juvenile fish(fry) were carried via horseback and planted in the area's high alpine lakes and streams. While the state often will now use aircraft to stock some of these high alpine lakes, the practice of stocking fish carried in by horseback continues for more delicate fingerling fish, like kokanee salmon. In 1971, the state record brook trout (7 pounds, 8 ounces) was caught in Boulder Mountain's waters. Brook trout are the prominent species stocked on Boulder Mountain. Colorado River Cutthroat are the fish species native to the area.

In 2014, a committee consisting of anglers and residents convened to determine the future management of the fisheries on Boulder Mountain. This committee assisted the Utah Division of Wildlife Resources in resolving the issue of overpopulating brook trout in the alpine lakes of Boulder Mountain. Based on the discussion, 35 percent of the lakes would be managed for trophy brook trout. The management plan categorized each lake into ten different sections: North Creek, North Slope, South Slope, East Slope, West Slope, Boulder Top, Griffin Top, and Escalante Mountain. The management plan introduces splake, tiger, and cutthroat trout to the waters that the committee deemed appropriate. Colorado cutthroat populations have steadily decreased since the introduction of brook trout to the area. Emphasizing the importance of re-establishing a healthy population of native trout in the area, sterile brook trout (triploid) and other sterile trout species, such as tiger and splake trout, were introduced to increase fishing opportunities.

In 2022, state biologists first stocked kokanee salmon in Boulder Mountain, in Blind Lake. Biologists hope that the kokanee population there will give anglers the opportunity to target these fish from shore, which is generally difficult to do for kokanee salmon. The other goal of the kokanee is to provide an additional food source for the splake, brook, and cutthroat trout populations.

== Flora ==
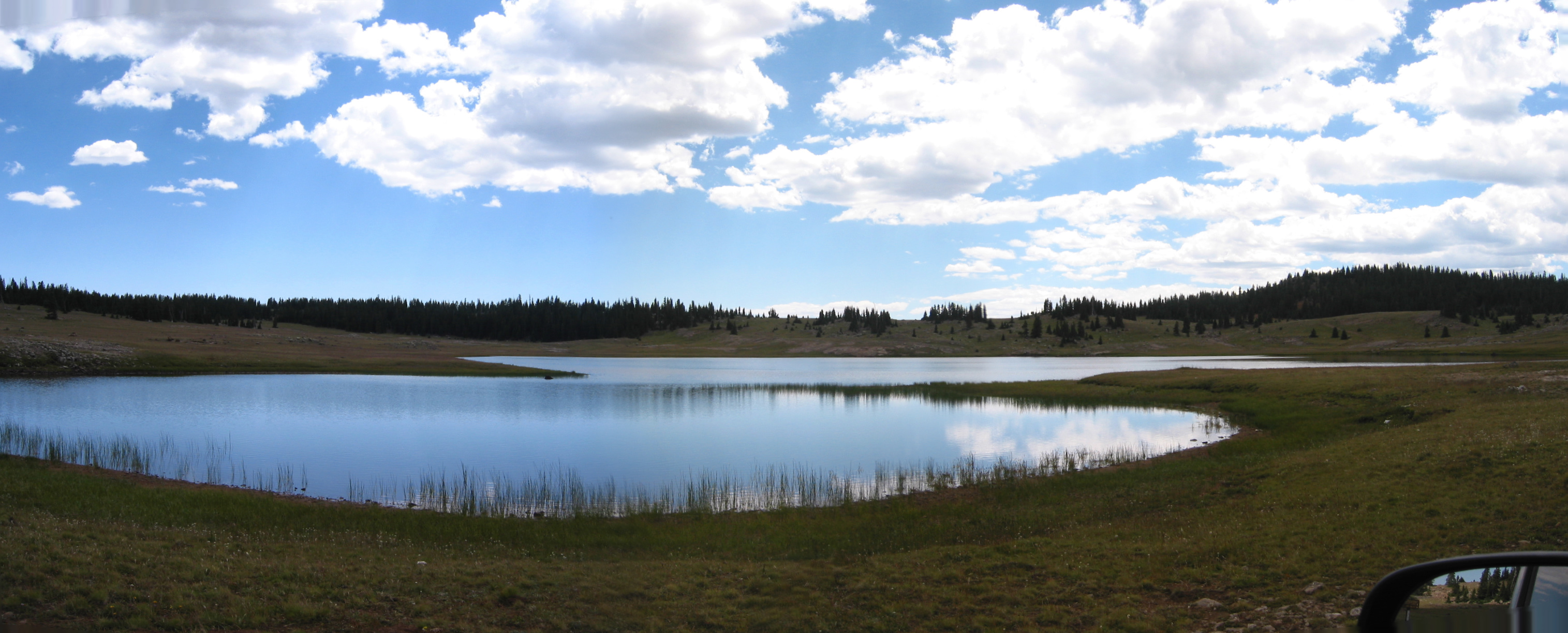
Boulder Top has many small lakes

The Boulder Mountain cinquefoil (Potentilla angelliae) is a rare species of plant that is endemic to Boulder Mountain. Acharophyte assemblage located at the Griffin Top section (Aquarius Plateau, Utah, USA) provides, for the first time, the relative age of the base of the Claron Formation.

== Fauna ==
The mountain is home to some of the biggest elk in the state of Utah, consistently producing some of the largest bull elk during the hunt each fall. The mountain is also known for mule deer. Predators are also prevalent; mountain lions and black bears are commonly seen throughout the area.

== In popular culture ==
The Scottish dream pop band Cocteau Twins named their fifth album Blue Bell Knoll after the mountain.

== See also ==
- Thousand Lake Mountain
