= Banda (given name) =

Banda is an Indian masculine given name that may refer to the following notable people:

- Banda Prakash (born 1954), Indian politician
- Banda Kanakalingeshwara Rao (1907–1968), Indian actor
- Banda Karthika Reddy (born 1977), Indian politician
- Banda Singh Bahadur (1670–1716), Sikh warrior
