= Christopher John Banda =

Malawian footballer

John Banda
Personal information
- Full name: Christopher-John Banda
- Date of birth: 10 July 1974
- Place of birth: Blantyre, Malawi
- Date of death: 6 September 2009 (aged 35)
- Place of death: Lilongwe, Malawi
- Position: Midfielder

Senior career*
Years	Team	Apps	(Gls)
1996–2001	MTL Wanderers	74	(20)
2001–2003	Big Bullets	41	(8)
2003–2009	Kuchekuche Stars	88	(25)

International career
1996–2009	Malawi	70	(23)
- * Club domestic league appearances and goals

Christopher-John Banda (10 July 1974 in Blantyre, Malawi – 6 September 2009) was a Malawian footballer.

== Club career ==
- 1996-01: MTL Wanderers
- 2001-03: Big Bullets
- 2003-09: Kuchekuche Stars

== International career ==
A longtime member of the Malawi national football team, Banda has competed for his national team from 1996 and played his last three games in 2009. His last international game, two days before his death, was against Guinea national football team.

== Death ==
He collapsed in the game from his club Kuchekuche Stars against Man Tour in a qualifying game for Standard Bank Fam Cup and died later at Kamuzu Central Hospital in Lilongwe.
