= Kjell Cronqvist =

Swedish footballer, football manager, and bandy player

Personal information
- Full name: Kjell Oscar Cronqvist
- Date of birth: 20 December 1920
- Place of birth: Malmö, Sweden
- Date of death: 9 February 2008 (aged 87)
- Place of death: Skarpnäck, Sweden
- Position: Goalkeeper

Senior career*
Years	Team	Apps	(Gls)
- Brage
1944–1952	Djurgården		

Managerial career
- 1956–1957: Djurgårdens IF
- * Club domestic league appearances and goals

Kjell Cronqvist (20 December 1920 – 9 February 2008) was a Swedish footballer, football manager and bandy player. He was Djurgårdens IF manager in 1956–57.
