= Carlos Banda (footballer, born 1978) =

Chilean-Swedish football manager

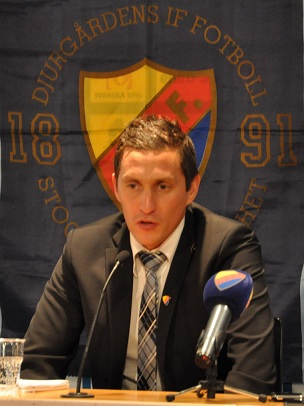
- Banda at a press conference on 4 April 2011

Personal information
- Date of birth: 28 March 1978 (age 48)
- Place of birth: Chile
- Height: 1.68 m (5 ft 6 in)
- Position: Defender

Team information
- Current team: Assyriska FF (manager)

Senior career*
Years	Team	Apps	(Gls)
–1999	FC Café Opera		

Managerial career
- –2003: IF Brommapojkarna (youth coach)
- 2003–2010: Hammarby IF (youth coach)
- 2010: Djurgården IF
- 2011–2012: Djurgården IF (assistant coach)
- 2012–2016: Hammarby IF (assistant coach)
- 2017: Vasalunds IF
- 2018: Assyriska FF
- * Club domestic league appearances and goals

Carlos Banda (born 28 March 1978) is a Chilean-Swedish football manager. He is the manager of Assyriska FF.

Banda played his highest level of football in then fourth tier team FC Café Opera, before he retired from football as a player due to a groin injury he had in 1999. He began coaching youth teams of IF Brommapojkarna and moved on to Stockholm rival Hammarby IF in 2003, to coach in Hammarby's youth organization.

Banda signed on for his first senior team Djurgården on 3 December 2009. Along with co-manager Lennart Wass, Banda led his team to a tenth position in the 2010 Allsvenskan. He stayed with Djurgården as an assistant coach to new manager Magnus Pehrsson until July 2012.

He then returned to Hammarby where he again was assigned the role of assistant manager. A position Banda held during the reigns of three managers: Gregg Berhalter, Thomas Dennerby and Nanne Bergstrand. Ultimately he left Hammarby by mutual consent in June 2016 after four years at the club.

== Personal life ==
Born in Chile, Banda emigrated to Sweden when he was a child and returned to his country of birth in 1994, having a trial with Universidad Católica thanks to the coach Gino Valentini, who is a friend of his uncle. Then, he returned to Sweden.

He has gone to Chile to give some football talks.
