= Noel Herman Holmgren =

American plant taxonomist

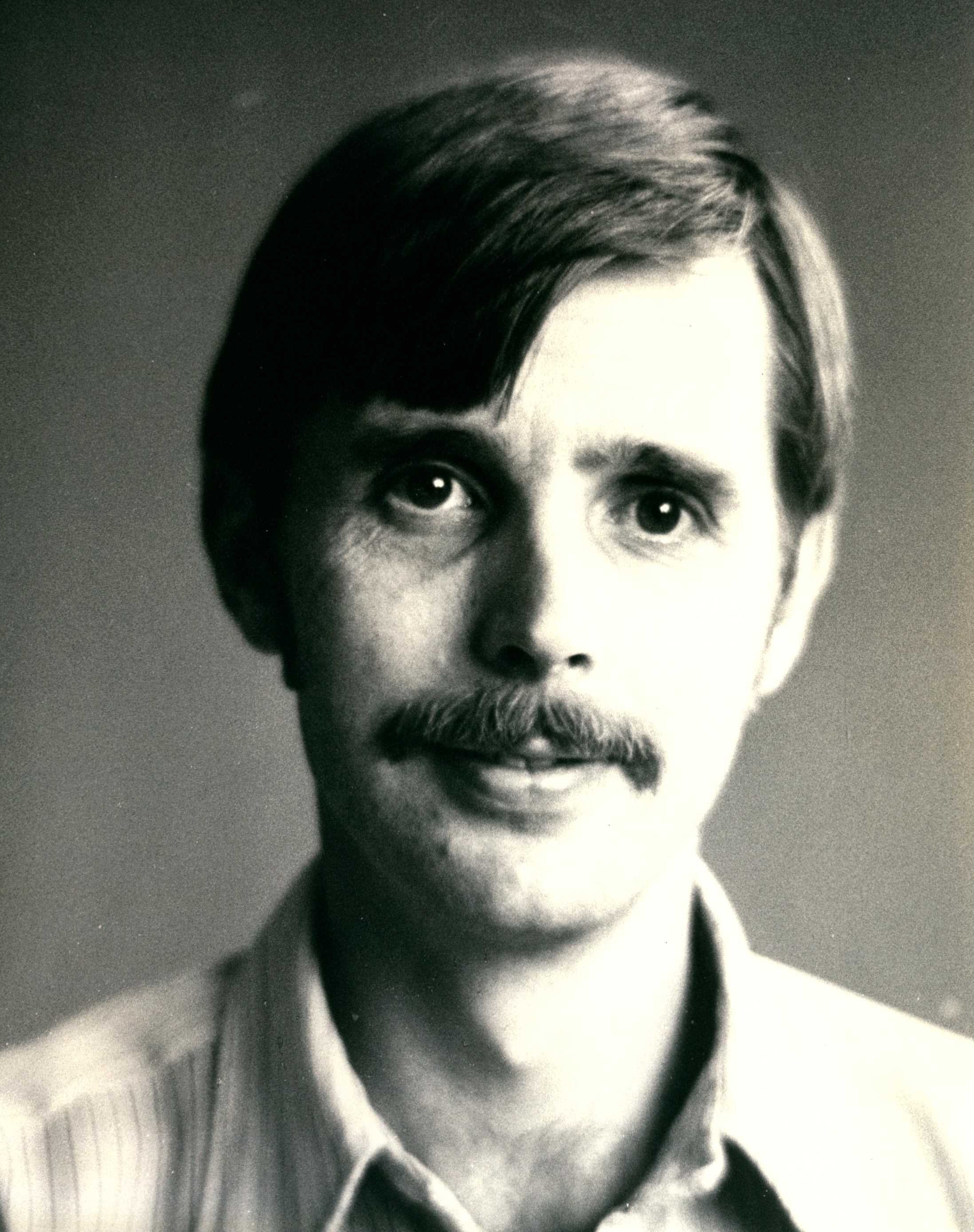
- In 1971
- Born: 1937 (age 88–89)
- Education: Columbia University
- Scientific career
- Fields: Botany
- Institutions: New York Botanical Garden
- Author abbrev. (botany): N.H.Holmgren

Noel Herman Holmgren (Salt Lake City, 1937) is a botanist and explorer from the United States, and a professor of botany at Utah State Agricultural College. He has conducted extensive botanical expeditions to Mexico, Ecuador, Suriname, Venezuela, and Argentina (Tierra del Fuego Province, Antarctica and South Atlantic Islands).

He was a senior curator at the New York Botanical Garden.

== Biography ==
Born in Salt Lake City, Utah in 1937. His father, Arthur Herman Holmgren (1912–1992), was also a botanist. Noel Holmgren received his doctorate from Columbia University in 1968, and joined the New York Botanical Garden as a research associate. He was appointed associate curator in 1969, curator in 1974, and senior curator in 1984. He also taught at Lehman College, City University of New York, and was the regular editor of the journal Brittonia for 14 years (1977–1990). He specialised in the taxonomy of the family Scrophulariaceae and the floristics of western North America. Since 1969, he has directed his research toward the Intermountain Flora project, to which he has made significant contributions. He was the lead editor of the major illustrated work, Manual of the Vascular Plants of Northeastern United States and Adjacent Canada, published in 1997. Member of numerous scientific, biological, and botanical societies and clubs.

== Selected publications ==
- arthur hermann Holmgren, noel h. Holmgren. 1988. Euphorbia aaron-rossii (Euphorbiaceae), a new species from Marble and Grand Canyons of the Colorado River, Arizona. Ed. New York Botanical Garden. 6 pp.

=== Books ===
- 2005. Intermountain flora: Subclass Dilliniidae. Volumen 2. Ed. New York Botanical Garden. 488 pp. ISBN 978-0-89327-469-6
- patricia kern Holmgren, N.H.Holmgren, Lisa C. Barnett. 1990. Index Herbariorum: The herbaria of the world. Volumen 120 de Regnum vegetabile. Ed. International Association for Plant Taxonomy by New York Botanical Gardens. 693 pp. ISBN 978-0-89327-358-3
- noel hermann Holmgren, ulf Molau. 1984. Flora of Ecuador: 177. Scrophulariaceae. Opera Botanica Series B.Ed. House of the Swedish Research Councils. 189 pp. ISBN 978-91-86344-21-4
- arthur Cronquist, arthur h. Holmgren, noel h. Holmgren, james l. Reveal. 1972. Intermountain flora: vascular plants of the Intermountain West, U.S.A.: Geological and botanical history of the region, its plant geography and a glossary. The vascular cryptograms and the gymnosperms. Ed. Hafner Pub. Co. 270 pp.

== Eponymy ==
Species

- Astragalus holmgreniorum Barneby—named in honor of Patricia Holmgren and Noel Holmgren
- Carex holmgreniorum Reznicek & D.F. Murray — named in honor of Arthur H. Holmgren, Noel Holmgren, and Patricia Holmgren
- Hiraea holmgreniorum C.E. Anderson—named in honor of Patricia Holmgren and Noel Holmgren
- Mentzelia holmgreniorum J.J. Schenk & L. Hufford—named in honor of Patricia Holmgren and Noel Holmgren
- Orthocarpus tolmiei subsp. holmgreniorum T.I. Chuang & Heckard—named in honor of Arthur H. Holmgren, Noel Holmgren, and Patricia Holmgren
- Scutellaria holmgreniorum Cronquist—named in honor of Patricia Holmgren and Noel Holmgren
- (Zamiaceae) Dioon holmgrenii De Luca, Sabato & Vázq.Torres

== Awards ==
- 2012 N.H. Holmgren, together with his wife Patricia Kern Holmgren was awarded the Asa Gray Award for his lifelong accomplishments in the field of Plant Taxonomy.
- 2007 Myrtle Hebert Award from the American Penstemon Society.
- 1998 Professional and Scholarly Publishing Division, Association of American Publishers, Inc., for 1998’s best book in the biological sciences, Illustrated Companion to Gleason & Cronquist’s Manual: Illustrations of the Vascular Plants of Northeastern United States and Adjacent Canada
- 1994 Edgar T. Wherry Award by the North American Rock Garden Society, for outstanding contributions to the dissemination of knowledge about native American plants
- 1988 The New York Botanical Garden's Distinguished Service Award
