= Asoma Banda =

Ghanaian businessman (1933–2025)

- Born: Asoma Abu Banda; 21 June 1933; Kintampo, Ghana
- Died: 1 March 2025 (aged 91); Accra, Ghana
- Occupation: Businessman
- Known for: CEO of the Antrak Group of Companies
- Title: Alhaji Dr.
- Spouse: Cassandra Aisha Banda
- Children: 12

Alhaji Asoma Abu Banda (also spelt Asumah Banda) was a Ghanaian businessman and philanthropist who was chairman and Chief Executive Officer of the Antrak Group of Companies. He was the first Chancellor of the University of Education, Winneba, serving from 2010 to 2023

== Early life and education ==
Banda was born in June 1933 and hailed from Kintampo in the former Brong Ahafo Region, currently in the Bono East Region. He attended the Government Boys in Kumasi. He further had his Ordinary and Advanced Level certificate and also diploma in Marketing/ Sales Management in London.

== Career ==
In 2010, Banda was the Chancellor of the University of Education, Winneba.

He was the Executive Chairman of Antrak Air; Executive Chairman of Antrak Express Limited; President of Ship Owners and Agents Association of Ghana; board chairman of Meridian Port Services Limited. Banda was also a board member of Ghana Ports and Harbours Authority, Ghana Maritime Authority and The Ghana Shippers’ Council.

=== Political career ===
Banda was a member of the Convention People's Party. He was also a former chairman of the People's Convention Party. He was also a former member of the Council of State.

== Personal life and death ==
In 2013, his wife Cassandra Aisha Banda filed for a divorce. He had a second wife by the name Edwina Baaba Coussey Banda. He also had two sons called Fadel Asuma Banda, and Jamel Banda. He had two sisters called Hajia Shatta Abu Banda and Hajia Meeli Banda. He had 12 children.

Banda was a Muslim. He died in Accra on 1 March 2025, at the age of 92.

== Legacy ==
A mosque was built in his name called the Alhaji Banda's Mosque.
