= Banda District, Ghana =

District of Ghana

Banda District District de Banda
- District
- Districts of Bono Region

- Location of Banda District within Bono Region
- Coordinates: 8°10′N 2°22′W
- Country: Ghana
- Region: Bono Region
- Capital: Banda Ahenkro

Area
  - Total: 2,133 km^{2} (824 sq mi)

Population (2021 Census)
  - Total: 28,179
  - Density: 13.21/km^{2} (34.22/sq mi)
- Time zone: UTC+0 (GMT)

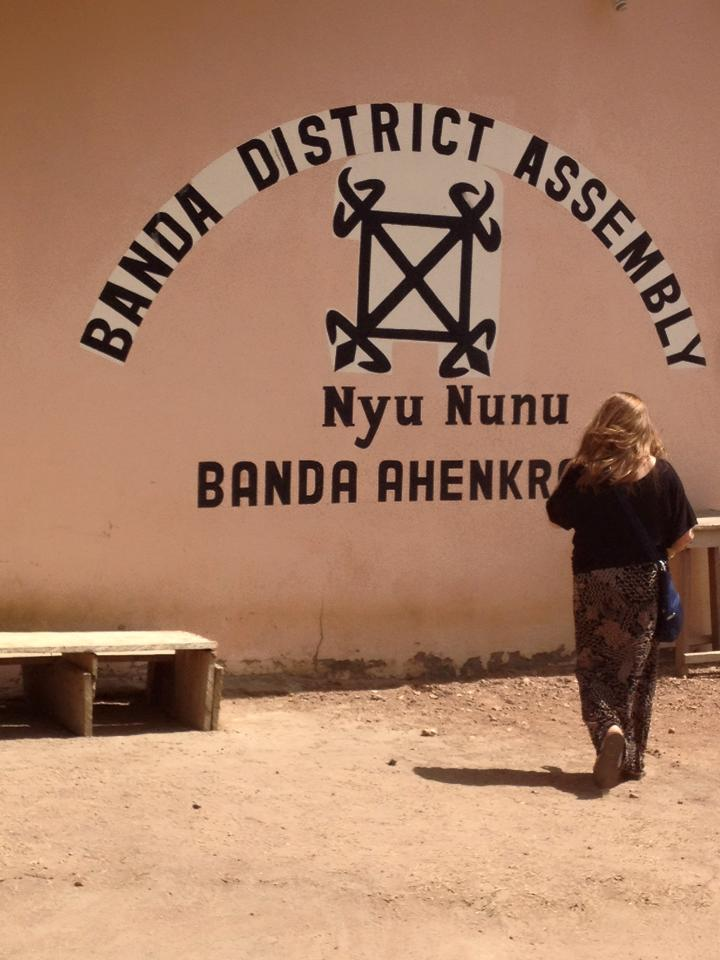
Banda District Assembly

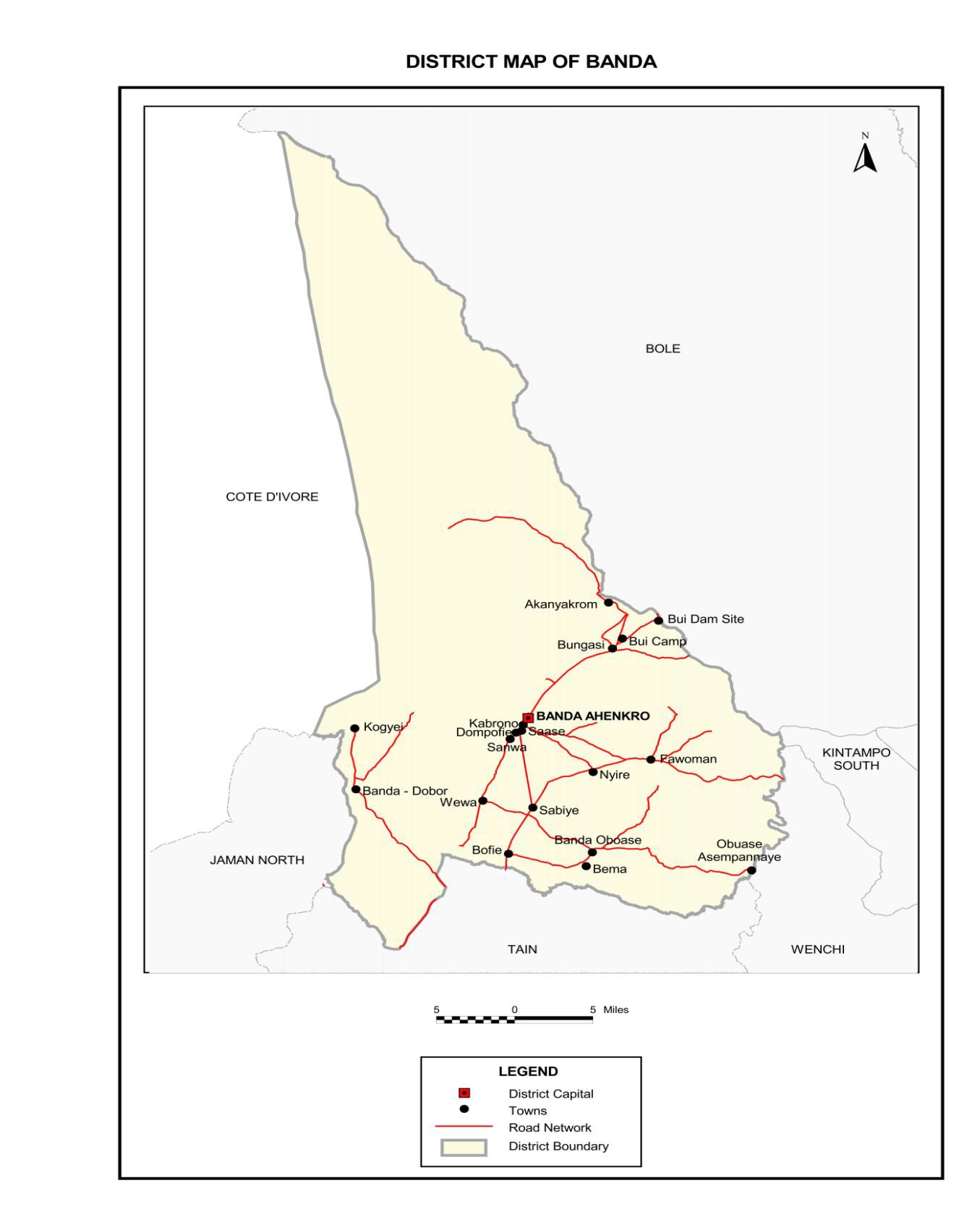
Map of Banda District

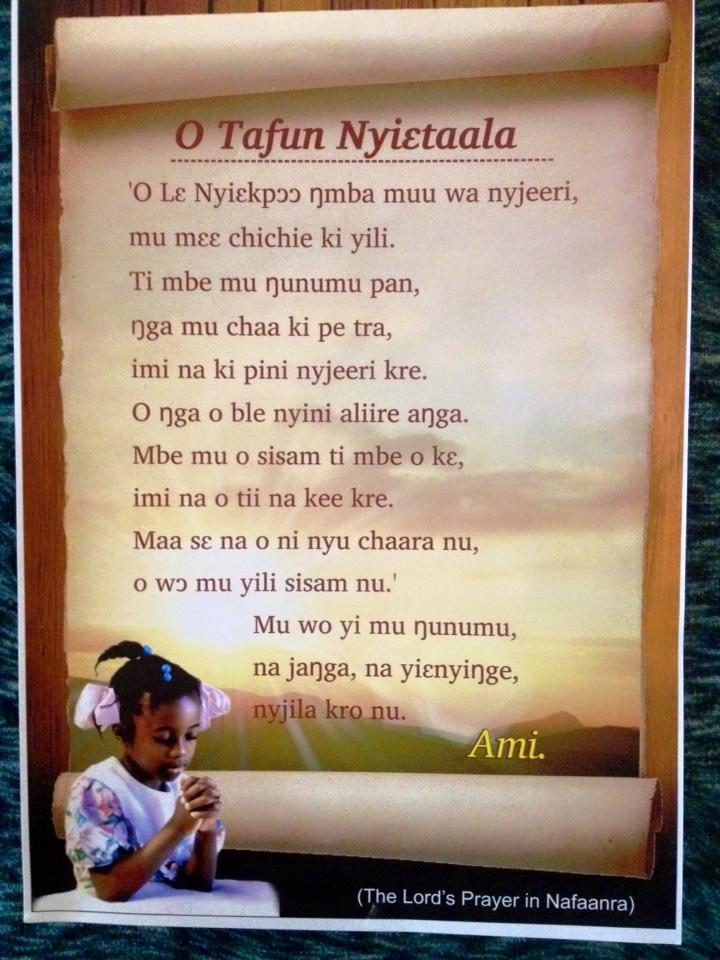
The Lord's Prayer in Nafaanra

Banda District is one of the twelve districts in Bono Region, Ghana. Originally it was formerly part of the then-larger Tain District on 17 February 2004; until the northern part of the district was split off to create Banda District on 28 June 2012; thus the remaining part has been retained as Tain District. The district assembly is located in the northeast part of Bono Region and has Banda Ahenkro as its capital town.

== History ==
The Late President, H.E. J.E.A Mills, by an Executive Instrument (E.I) created 46 new Districts. All the inaugurated and confirmed MMDAs established are operational with immediate effect hence bringing the total number of MMDAs to 216.

The district has a population size of 45,000 as at 2010 with males being 21,000 and females being 24,000 (Source: Ghana Statistical Service –Population Estimates for Brong Ahafo Region-2010). The current population based on the Ghana Statistical Service record is 25,123. The population has been increasing over the years with a growth rate of 2.6%.

== List of settlements ==
Settlements of Banda District
No.	Settlements	Population	Population year
1	Banda Ahenkro		
2	Banda Boase		
3	Bongasi		
4	Bofie		
5	Bandawan		
6	Akanyakrom		
7	Dorbor		
8	Sabiye		
9	Wewa		
10	Nyire		
11	Kanka		
12	Saase		
13	Dompofie		
14	Kabrono		
15	Fawoman		
16	Makala		
17	Tainano		
18	Samba		
19	Samba Wala Akura		
20	Bui Village		
21	Boase		
22	Akanyakrom		
23	Kogyei (Kojee)		
24	Bima (Berma)		
25	Dumbole (Dumoli)		
26	Samba (Sanwa)		
27	Sogukrom		
28	Boforakurase		
29	Brosan Camp		
30	Kamankyeli		
31	Tabon Akura		
32	Tabon Tibiri		
33	Ohia Mpenika		
34	Gbao		
35	Bui Camp		
