= Jaman (disambiguation) =

Jaman may refer to:

== Business ==
- Jaman, company that offers users a movie discovery site

== Places ==
- Dent de Jaman, a mountain near Montreux, Switzerland
- Jaman, Iran, a village in Naghan Rural District, Naghan District, Kiar County, Chaharmahal and Bakhtiari Province, Iran
- Jaman District, former district that was located in the Brong Ahafo Region of Ghana
- Jaman North District, district of the Brong Ahafo Region of Ghana
  - Jaman North (Ghana parliament constituency)
- Jaman South District, district of the Brong Ahafo Region of Ghana
  - Jaman South (Ghana parliament constituency)

== Persons ==
- Jaman, Dutch singer
- Jaman Lal Sharma (1936–2007), Indian field hockey player

== See also ==
- Gyaaman, or Jaman Kingdom, medieval African state of the Akan people, located in what is now Ghana and Côte d'Ivoire
