= Victor Ferkah =

Ghanaian broadcast journalist

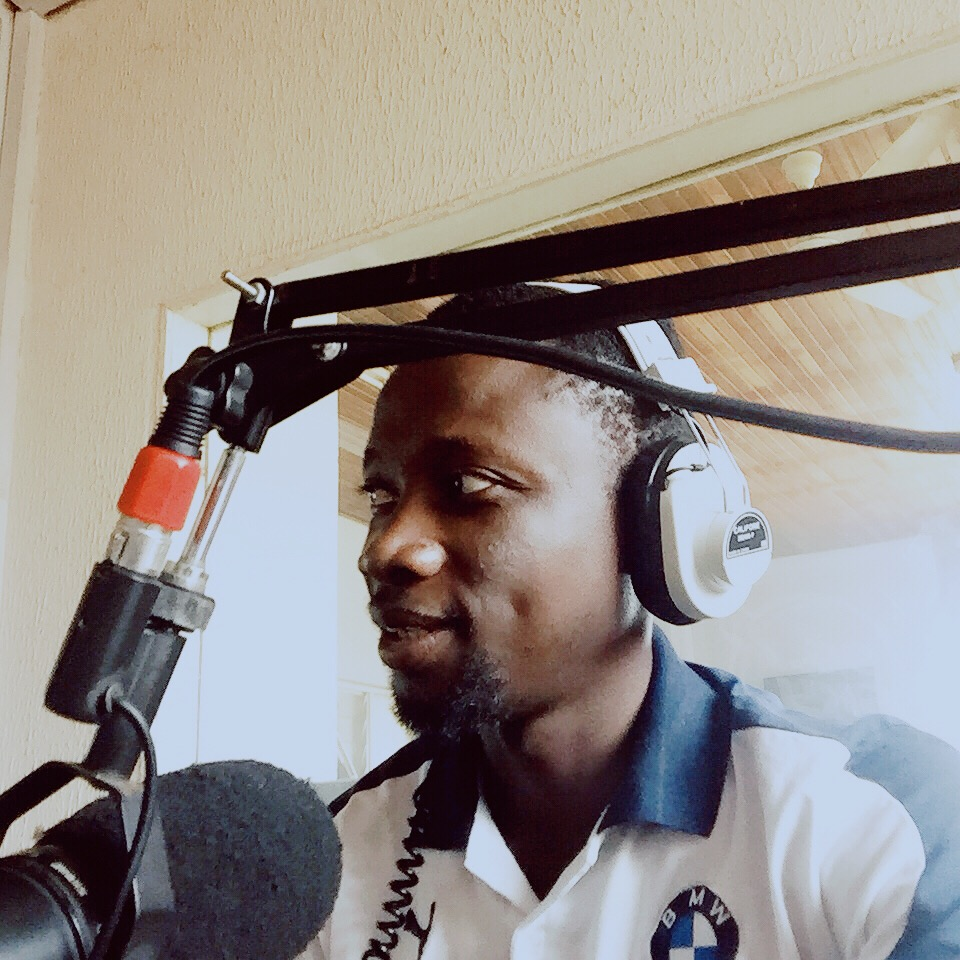
- Born: 9 October 1986; Sampa, Ghana
- Education: Kumasi High School; Catholic University College of Ghana
- Occupations: Broadcast journalist, radio personality
- Years active: 2012–present
- Known for: Sky FM (96.7) (Radio) Ghana
- Notable work: Ferk Relief Foundation

Victor Ferkah (born 9 October 1986) is a Ghanaian broadcast journalist and radio personality who currently works for Sky FM (96.7) Ghana as part of his community service. Aside from radio, he works full-time as a senior administrative assistant at the University of Energy and Natural Resources in Sunyani. Ferkah is also the Founder and CEO of the Ferk Relief Foundation, a non-governmental organization based in Sunyani, Ghana. He is a graduate of the Catholic University College of Ghana (Fiapre) and a student of law.

== Early life ==
Ferkah began his early education at Light International School at Wamfie, completed his Junior High School education at Voice of Deliverance Junior High School, Berekum in 2004 and went on to attend the Kumasi High School in 2004. After his high school education, he attended the Catholic University College of Ghana, Fiapre, where he offered a Program in Public Health and Allied Sciences (Health Management option).

== Personal ==
Ferkah is the eldest child of David Okrah and Comfort Sekyeraa. His father is from Nsonsonmea, a suburb of Sampa in the Jaman North District of Ghana who served as a Purchasing Clerk for the Produce Buying Company at Sefwi, Bonsu-Nkwanta in the Western North Region. Aside from this, he is also a cocoa farmer. His mother, Comfort Sekyeraa, is a farmer from the village of Gonasua in the Jaman South District of Ghana.

== Journalism career ==
Ferkah was among few persons selected by University of Energy and Natural Resources in Sunyani, to start a campus-based radio station, Greena FM in Sunyani, Ghana. In 2019, he joined Sky FM (96.7) where he currently serves as a broadcast journalist.
