= Nelson Kyeremeh =

Ghanaian politician

Hon. Nelson Kyeremeh
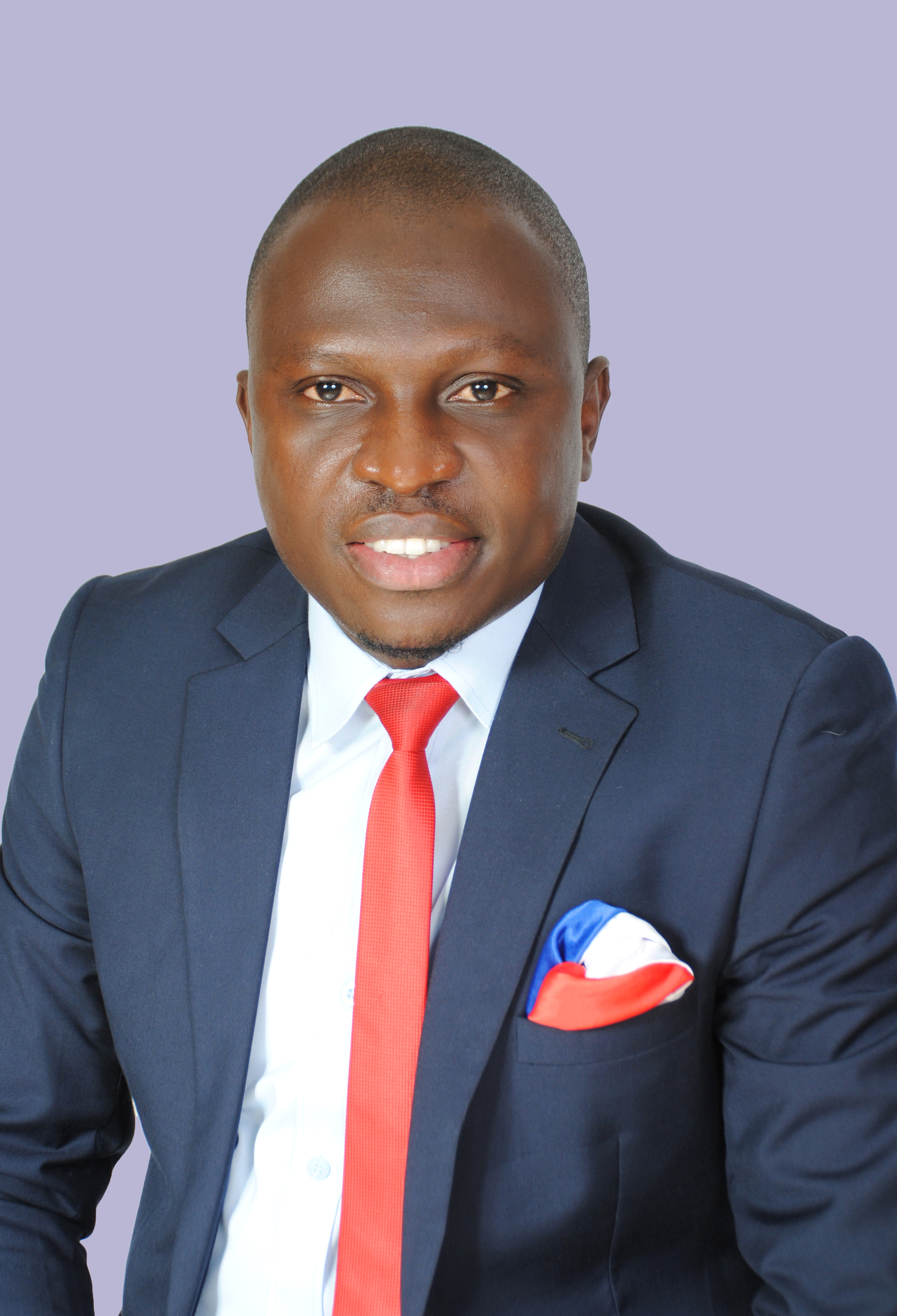

Member of Parliament for Berekum East
- Incumbent
- Assumed office 7 January 2021

Personal details
- Born: Nelson Kyeremeh; 27 March 1985 (age 41) Berekum, Ghana
- Party: New Patriotic Party
- Occupation: Politician
- Profession: Administrator
- Committees: Members Holding Offices of Profit Committee; Works and Housing Committee Health Committee

Nelson Kyeremeh is a Ghanaian politician and an administrator. He has been the member of parliament for the Berekum East Constituency in the Bono Region since 7 January 2021.

== Early life and education ==
Kyeremeh was born on 27 March 1985 and hails from Berekum in the Bono Region of Ghana. He obtained his basic education certificate in 2000 and his secondary school certificate in 2003. He was awarded his Bachelor of Science degree in Management Studies (Administration/Management) in 2012 succeeding a Diploma in Basic Education in 2009.

== Career ==
Kyeremeh was an Assistant Headteacher with the Ghana Education Service and subsequently an Administrator at Agyengoplus Transport and Logistical Service Limited.

== Politics ==
Kyeremeh won to contest as the NPP Parliamentary candidate for the Berekum East Constituency against the incumbent MP Kwabena Twum-Nuamah. He further won the 2020 general elections by 27,731 votes making 61.3% of total votes cast whilst the NDC parliamentary candidate Simon Ampaabeng Kyeremeh had 17,305 votes making 38.2% of the total votes cast and an Independent candidate Francis Manu-Gyan had 217 votes making 0.5% of the total votes cast.

=== Committees ===
Kyeremeh is a member of Members Holding Offices of Profit Committee and a member of Works and Housing Committee.

== Personal life ==
Kyeremeh is a Christian.

== Philanthropy ==
In November 2021, he presented some educational materials to about 41 public schools.
