= Jaman District =

- Former District
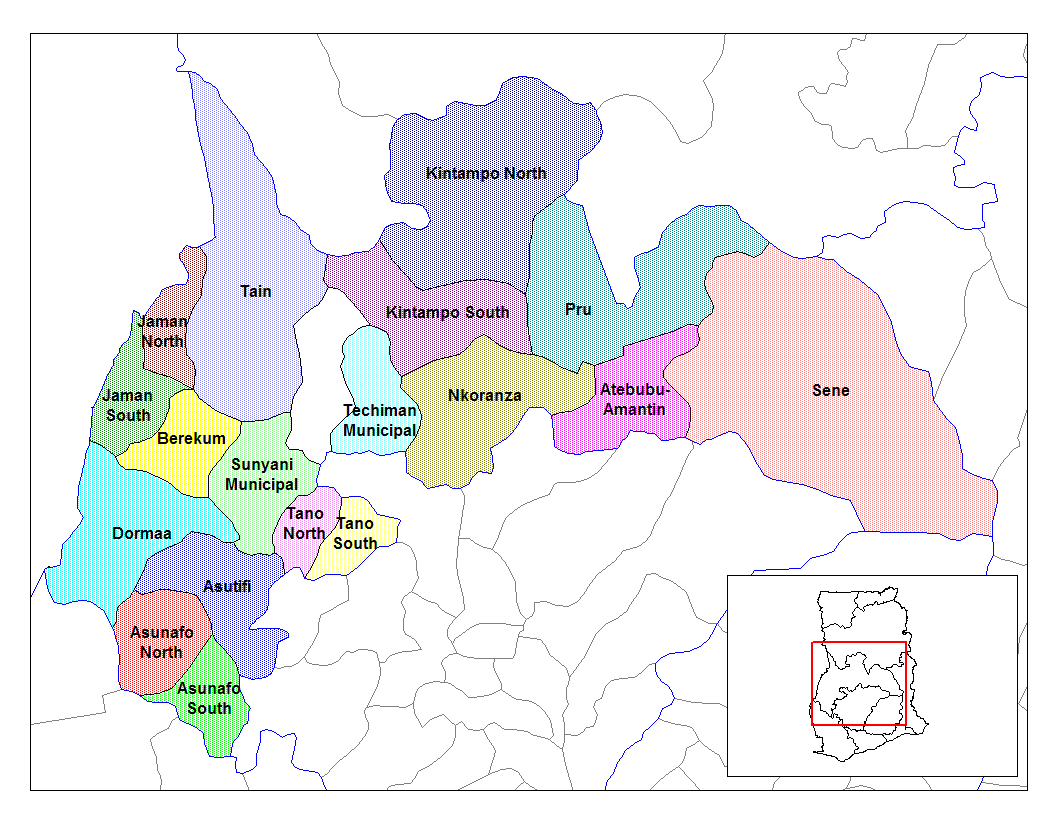
- Districts of Brong-Ahafo Region

- Location of Jaman District within Brong-Ahafo
- Coordinates: 7°35′0.89″N 2°47′7.62″W
- Country: Ghana
- Region: Brong-Ahafo
- Capital: Drobo

Area
  - Total: 1,376 km^{2} (531 sq mi)

Population (2012)
  - Total: —
- Time zone: UTC+0 (GMT)

Jaman District is a former district that was located in Brong-Ahafo Region (now currently in Bono Region), Ghana. Originally created as an ordinary district assembly on 10 March 1989 when it was known as Jaman District, which was created from the former Berekum-Jaman District Council. However on 12 November 2003 (effectively 17 February 2004), it was split off into two new districts: Jaman South District (which it was elevated to municipal district assembly status on 1 November 2017 (effectively 15 March 2018); capital: Drobo) and Jaman North District (capital: Sampa). The district assembly was located in the western part of Brong-Ahafo Region (now western part of Bono Region) and had Berekum as its capital town.

== See also ==
- Gyaaman

== Sources ==
- "Jaman District". Statoids.
- District: Jaman District
- 19 New Districts Created , November 20, 2003.
