= Munufie Festival =

Festival in Ghana by the people of Mpuasu-Japekrom

Munufie Festival is an annual festival celebrated by the chiefs and people of Gyaman (Drobo, Japekrom, Suma among others) in the Jaman North and Jaman South District of the Bono region, formerly Brong Ahafo Region of Ghana. It is usually celebrated in the month of October. The people of Mpuasu-Japekrom Traditional Area also celebrate theirs in September. The people and chiefs of Abi Traditional Area also celebrate theirs in September.

== Celebrations ==
During the festival, visitors are welcomed to share food and drinks. The people put on traditional clothes and there is a durbar of chiefs. There is also dancing and drumming.

== Significance ==
This festival is celebrated to mark an event that took place in the past.
