= Notre Dame High School (Ghana) =

Location
- P. O. Box 670; Fiapre, Sunyani-Ghana. Bono Region; Fiapre; Ghana; 7°21′38″N 2°21′31″W

Information
- School type: Public School, All Girls School
- Motto: In God We Are One
- Denomination: Catholic
- Established: 28 September 1987
- Founder: Bishop James Kwadwo Owusu
- School district: Sunyani
- Oversight: Ministry of Education
- Headmistress: Sister Irene Brookman-Arthur
- Gender: Girls
- Enrollment: Computerised School Selection and Placement System (CSSPS)
- Education system: Boarding and Day
- Classes offered: Home Economics, Science, General Arts, Visual Arts, Business
- Language: English, Elective Twi, Basic French
- Hours in school day: 8
- Houses: 4
- Colours: White and Navy Blue
- Nickname: Nketesia(Noble Ladies)
- Communities served: All communities in Ghana

Notre Dame High School (French: Lycée Notre Dame) is an all-female second cycle institution in Fiapre in the Bono Region of Ghana.

== History ==
Notre Dame High School was established on 28 September 1987 by the cooperative efforts of the then Catholic Bishop of Sunyani, Reverend James Kwadwo Owusu and the School Sisters of Notre Dame, Reverend Sister Dorez Mehrtens and Chiefs and people of Fiapre with an initial number of 37 females.

The first cramped temporary premises of the school were in a renovated technical school near St. Patrick's Primary and Junior Secondary School behind the Christ the King Cathedral in Sunyani.

The school has passed under the leadership of four substantive Headmistresses, the first three of whom were School Sisters of Notre Dame. The pioneer Headmistress was Rev. Sr. Joan Schaeffer, SSND with Rev. Sr. Mary Busson SSND as the Assistant Headmistress. The two were joined by two Rev. Sisters namely Sr. Therese Nowakoski SSND and Sr. Dorothy Ann SSND and three lay personnel as the teaching staff.

The first students enrolled generally were those who would have been rejected by the well endowed schools in Ghana. The plan was to locate the school in Fiapre where the Chief and the Fiapre Community had donated the land. Progress on the Fiapre site developed very slowly due to limited funds. Construction commenced in 1992 and only in 1996 did the new Notre Dame Girls Senior High School open for classes at the present site.

The foundation stone laying ceremony was performed by the Rev. James Kwadwo Owusu, the then Bishop of the Roman Catholic Diocese of Sunyani in September 1996.

Rev. Sr. Joan Bellew SSND was the Headmistress assisted by Rev. Sr. Mary Leonora Tucker, SSND. The student enrollment stood at 197.

The Headmistress who followed Rev. Sr. Joan Schaefer, SSND and pursued the traditions of the founding members were: Rev. Sr. Joan Beltew, SSND, Rev. Sr. Vivian Zolleer, SSND, Miss Margaret Lucy Donkor who handed over to Rev. Sr. Carolyn Boisabi Anyega, SSND. The student population as of the end of 2014/15 academic year was 850 students.
