= Kwafie Festival =

Festival in Ghana by the Dormaa people

- Location: Dormaa Ahenkro
- Country: Ghana
- Years active: every year in November / December

Kwafie Festival is an annual festival celebrated by the chiefs and people of Dormaa, Berekum and Nsoatre, in the Bono Region. This event is celebrated in remembrance of the ancestors and it is also meant as purification. Among the many activities, the most interesting is the burning of a large bonfire in the courtyard. The people of Dormaa, Berekum and Nsoatre also celebrate it in November/ December.

== Celebrations ==
During the festival, visitors are welcomed to share food and drinks. The people put on traditional clothes and there is durbar of chiefs. There is also dancing and drumming. The Kwafie Festival is celebrated in Dormaa Ahenkro, Berekum, and Nsuatre in the Brong Ahafo Region of Ghana to commemorate the bringing of fire to the area, said to have been accomplished by ancestors who emigrated to this region long ago. The celebration lasts about three days and can occur in either November, December, or January. In Dormaa Ahenkro the festival begins with an evening torchlight procession from the palace to the house where the sacred stools are kept. The ancestors are worshipped with libations, then the procession returns to the palace. The next morning everyone gathers at the palace where the chief presides over the "laying of logs," or Nkukuato, in which lower-level officials bring in logs on their shoulders to give the chief. The highest ranking official chooses three logs to begin the fire, which is then used for cooking a ritual meal. Later in the day an even grander procession carries the ancestral stools to a nearby body of water for ritual purification. Other sacred ceremonies are also performed. Then the final day of the festival is marked by joyous dancing, music, and feasts on the palace grounds.

== Significance ==
This festival is celebrated to mark an event that took place in the past. The Dormaas are burn a large bonfire during the festival by claiming they brought fire to Ghana.
