= Sampa, Ghana =

Town in Bono East Region, Ghana

Sampa Samgba Sikasoko
- Urban
- Nickname: Border City
- Motto: Yeyiri Nafana
- Location in Ghana
- Coordinates: 7°57′N 2°42′W
- Country: Ghana
- Region: Bono Region
- District: Jaman North District
- Website: https://www.101lasttribes.com/tribes/senufo.html

Sampa is a town in the Bono Region of Ghana, on the border with Côte d'Ivoire. It is the capital of Jaman North District and was formerly the site of a slave market. It was also the capital of the Akan State of Gyaaman in the late 15th century. It is the largest border town in Ghana with a population of over 36,000. It is the principal town of the Nafana ethnic group. It is the leading producer of cashews in Ghana.

== Name ==
The name Sampa is believed to have originated from three words in the Nafaara language, also recognized as a branch of the Senufo languages spoken in northern Côte d'Ivoire, southeastern Mali, western Burkina Faso, and northwestern Ghana. The Nafaara/Senufo people are thought to trace their origins to the ancient Songhai Empire region and along the civilization of ancient Kush.

The word Sampa, as commonly recounted, is derived from a combination of three words: Seh (Go), Mm (and), and Pah (Come). When these are combined, they form the sound Sempa, which eventually evolved into the town's name, Sampa, meaning "go and come."

Another oral tradition attributes the name to a warrior named Sah. According to Nafaara customs, second-born males are often given the name Sah. This warrior, Sah, left for war and was absent for many years. One day, he finally returned, and upon seeing him, the townspeople exclaimed to one another, Sah Pah, meaning "Sah is back." Over time, this phrase became associated with the town, ultimately giving it its present sound name, Sampa.

Sampa was previously known as Sikasoko in the Abono (Akan original language), meaning "gold powder", referring to the abundant gold in the area in the past. In the 1890s, when the British and French colonialists established a boundary between their territories, Sikasoko was then the headquarters of the Northwestern Ashanti. Before Sunyani became the capital of the Northwestern Ashanti in 1906, Sampa had served as capital of the district, which comprised Jaman, Wenchi, Techiman, Berekum, Wam (Dormaa), Ahafo, Odumasi and Sunyani.

== History ==
The most recent account of the Nafaara people of Sampa suggests that they initially settled in Kakala before eventually establishing their final settlement in Sampa leaving behind a group of their kin in Kakala, a village in the northern part of Côte d'Ivoire.

Their migration was necessitated by the disruptions caused by the trans-Saharan trade, which brought brutal invasions and widespread destruction to communities in the south. This turmoil forced the people to split and migrate northward in safety. Two notable leaders led their journey, Tolee Sie Nyonogboo and Tolee Kra Longo. When they arrived at the Tambi area, the chief of Jamera invited them to help fight the Klolosa tribe in the neighborhood. Sie Nyonogboo asked Kra Longo and his team to pass through the Banda hills while he and his team took the west direction. It took Sie Nyonogboo and his men a relatively short time to conquer the Klolosa army around the present-day Debibi and Namasa area. After the war, a parcel of land being occupied by the chiefs and people of Sampa today was offered as a reward for their role in the war and to further prevent the Klolosa people from attacking Jamera.

The elders of Sampa explain that during the Trans-Saharan trade period, merchants from the south used to ply the main route that passed through Sampa to northern Africa. When they arrived at Sampa, they met the indigenes who wore cloth, a practice which was not common at the time. The merchants preferred to say they were traveling to the land of the cloth-wearing people (Firantoma foɔ), instead of the specific name of their destination. The word 'Firantoma foɔ' has been corrupted to 'Fantra foɔ' by their Bono neighbours, though the people of Sampa find the name 'Fantra foɔ' as pejorative.

Sampa served also as an important centre during the slave trade era. Bones of the countless slaves that were dumped in a mass grave are still visible at a spot in the nearby town of Jenini. Other items of historical interest in Sampa include the bungalows of the expatriate administrators, a ruined chapel of the Presbyterian Church and a cemetery of the colonial administrators with tombs dating back to the 19th century.

== Festivals ==
Sumgbɛɛ and Dwobofie are the two largest annual festivals of the royal stool of Sampa. The former is commemorated in late June or early July to honour the lives and works of the forefathers and mothers. In September, Dwobofie is held to celebrate the beginning of the new yam season. Eating yam before the celebration is forbidden for the paramount chief.

The name "Sumgbεε" is derived from the Nafaanra language. It is a corrupted word originating from "sro mgbεε." In Nafaanra, "sro" means food, and "mgbεε" means bad. The festival revolves around the concept of presenting the gods with "bad yams," "spoiled yams," or "old yams," symbolising the previous harvest, and seeking their blessings for an abundant harvest of new yams.

The Sumgbεε Festival holds great cultural and agricultural significance for the Nafana people of Sampa. It serves as a way for the community to express gratitude for past harvests and seek divine blessings for the upcoming agricultural season.

Highlights of the festival include collecting foodstuffs from traders at the Sampa market, capturing stray domestic fowls in the township, a youth wrestling competition, and delivering fire logs to the chief's palace. The youth wrestling event celebrates the warrior spirit of the Nafana people, as a reminder of how their ancestors prepared for the challenges of war.

The logs hold a special purpose—they are burned overnight under the guidance of the Gyasehene. The Gyasehene, whose title derives from "Gyase," meaning "kitchen," is entrusted with the responsibility of igniting the fire. The flames will continue to burn for an entire week until the following week, symbolising the essence of the festival. The Nafana people believe that the direction of the smoke when the fire is extinguished reveals what the upcoming year holds for farmers and their harvest.

== Education ==
There are a number of senior high and technical schools within Sampa and its environs. These include Nafana Presby Senior High, which is considered one of Ghana's best second cycle institutions. St. Ann's Senior High School, Our Lady of Fatima Technical Institute, Maranatha Business Senior High School, Diamono Senior High, and Duadaso No. 1 Senior High/Technical School are among the others. Sampa Nurses' Training College is the only tertiary institution located in Sampa.

== Health ==
Sampa is served by the Sampa Government Hospital, Fountain Care Hospital, and the Pieta Catholic Hospital, all of which contribute to nursing education at the Sampa Nurses' Training College. The town is also served by a number of health clinics.

== Economy ==
Agriculture, commerce, industrialisation, and service are Sampa's main economic activities. Sampa was a slave market place in Africa during the Atlantic slave trade, and it is now a cashew market center in Ghana. In Sampa, cashew buyers and purchasers from India and Vietnam have warehouses. Cashew nuts are transported to Sampa before being shipped to Tema for export by these enterprises' merchants in Bole, Wenchi, Dormaa, Techiman, Banda, and neighboring Côte d'Ivoire. Mondays are considered market days in Sampa. The Sampa Market is one of the largest in the Bono Region, with foreigners from Côte d'Ivoire and other parts of the country buying and selling goods.

== Notable people ==
- Siaka Stevens
- Frederick Yaw Ahenkwah
- Prince Kwabena Adu
