= Simon Ampaabeng Kyeremeh =

Ghanaian politician

Hon. Simon Ampaabeng Kyeremeh MP

Member of the Ghana Parliament for Berekum East
- Incumbent
- Assumed office 7 January 2025
- Preceded by: Nelson Kyeremeh
- President: John Dramani Mahama
- Vice President: Jane Naana Opoku-Agyemang

Personal details
- Born: 13 July 1985 (age 41) Berekum Senase, Bono Region, Ghana
- Party: National Democratic Congress
- Education: University for Development Studies; Ghana Statistical Service; University of Business and Integrated Development Studies
- Occupation: Politician
- Profession: Community development advocate
- Committees: Gender, Children and Social Welfare Committee; Assurance Committee

Simon Ampaabeng Kyeremeh (born July 13, 1977) is a Ghanaian politician and development planner who serves as the Member of Parliament for the Berekum East Constituency in the Bono Region. He was elected on the ticket of the National Democratic Congress (NDC) and currently serves in the Ninth Parliament of the Fourth Republic of Ghana.

== Early life and education ==
Kyeremeh was born in Berekum Senase, a town in the Bono Region of Ghana. He holds a Bachelor of Science degree in Planning from the Kwame Nkrumah University of Science and Technology (KNUST). He further obtained a Master of Public Administration (MPA) from the University of Ghana from the University of Ghana.

== Career ==
=== Politics ===
Kyeremeh was elected as the Member of Parliament for the Berekum East Constituency in the 2024 general elections on the ticket of the National Democratic Congress (NDC)

== Committees ==
He serves on the Local Government and Rural Development Committee and the Government Assurance Committee in Parliament.
