= Kwabena Twum-Nuamah =

Ghanaian politician

Hon. Kwabena Twum-Nuamah

Member of the Ghana Parliament for Berekum East
- Incumbent
- Assumed office Jan 2013
- Preceded by: First

Personal details
- Born: 17 January 1978 (age 48) Berekum, Brong-Ahafo Region, Ghana
- Party: New Patriotic Party
- Education: Kwame Nkrumah University of Science and Technology
- Occupation: Politician
- Profession: Medical doctor
- Committees: Health, finance

Kwabena Twum-Nuamah (born 17 January 1978) is a Ghanaian politician and medical doctor. He is a member of the New Patriotic Party and the incumbent Member of Parliament for Berekum East. He is also the chairperson for the Parliamentary Select Committee on Health and a member of the Finance Committee.

== Early life and education ==
Twum-Nuamah was born in 1978 at Berekum, Ghana. He studied at the Kwame Nkrumah University of Science and Technology where he obtained a Bachelor of Science in Human Biology (2000–2003), a Commonwealth Executive Masters in Business Administration (CEMBA) General Management (2009–2012) and an MSc Public Health (2011–2012).

== Politics ==
Twum-Nuamah is the Chairman of the Parliamentary Select Committee of the 7th Parliament of the 4th Republic in Ghana. He has been a member of the New Patriotic Party since 2013. He stood for parliament in the 2013 parliamentary election in the newly formed Berekum West constituency. He retained his seat in the Ghanaian parliamentary election of 2016. He is also a member of the Parliamentary Select Committee on Finance.

== Personal life ==
Twum-Nuamah is married (with three children). He is a Christian (Methodist).

== See also ==
- Berekum West constituency

== External links and sources ==
- Profile on Parliament of Ghana website
