= Sumaman Senior High School =

High school in Suma-Ahenkro, Ghana

Coordinates: 7.921°N 2.718°W

- Suma-Ahenkro, Bono Region; Ghana

Information
- Type: secondary/high school,
- Established: 1981 (45 years ago)
- Grades: Forms [1-3]

Sumaman Senior High School is a public senior high school located in Suma-Ahenkro in the Jaman North District in the Bono Region of Ghana.

== History ==
The Omanhene and elders of the Suma Traditional Area established the school in September 1981 as a community day secondary school. In September 1989, it was fully absorbed after it was initially partially absorbed into the public stream. In 2022, the school won the Bono Regional Renewable Energy Challenge.

== Notable past students ==
- Kwadwo Adinkrah-Appiah, Vice-Chancellor of Sunyani Technical University
- Samuel Obour, Registrar of Sunyani Technical University
- Alex Kwasi Awuah, managing director of ARB Apex Bank
