= Sacred Heart Senior High School (Nsoatre) =

Mixed second cycle school in Nsoatre, Ghana

Coordinates: 7.413°N 2.476°W

- Nsoatre, Bono Region; Ghana

Information
- Type: secondary/high school
- Established: 1977 (49 years ago)
- Grades: Forms [1-3]
- Nickname: SAHESS

Sacred Heart Senior High School (SAHESS) is a second cycle institution located in Nsoatre in the Sunyani West Municipal District in the Bono Region of Ghana. In 2022, the school emerged winners of the maiden insurance quiz competition hosted by the National Insurance Commission in the Bono Region.

== History ==
The school was established in 1977. It was later absorbed in 1984 into the public system.
