= Berekum West District =

District in Bono Region, Ghana

Berekum West District District de Berekum-Ouest
- District
- Districts of Bono Region

- Location of Berekum West District within Bono Region
- Coordinates: 7°26′N 2°39′W
- Country: Ghana
- Region: Bono Region
- Capital: Jinijini

Population (2021 Census)
  - Total: 49,464
- Time zone: UTC+0 (GMT)

Berekum West District is one of the twelve districts in Bono Region, Ghana. Originally it was formerly part of the then-larger Berekum District on 10 March 1989, which was created from the former Berekum-Jaman District Council (which it was later upgraded to municipal district assembly status and has been renamed as Berekum Municipal District on 29 February 2008); until the western part of the district was split off to create Berekum West District on 15 March 2018; thus the remaining part has been renamed as Berekum East Municipal District. The district assembly is located in the western part of Bono Region and has Jinijini as its capital town.
