= Osram ne nsoromma =

Adinkra symbol in Ghana

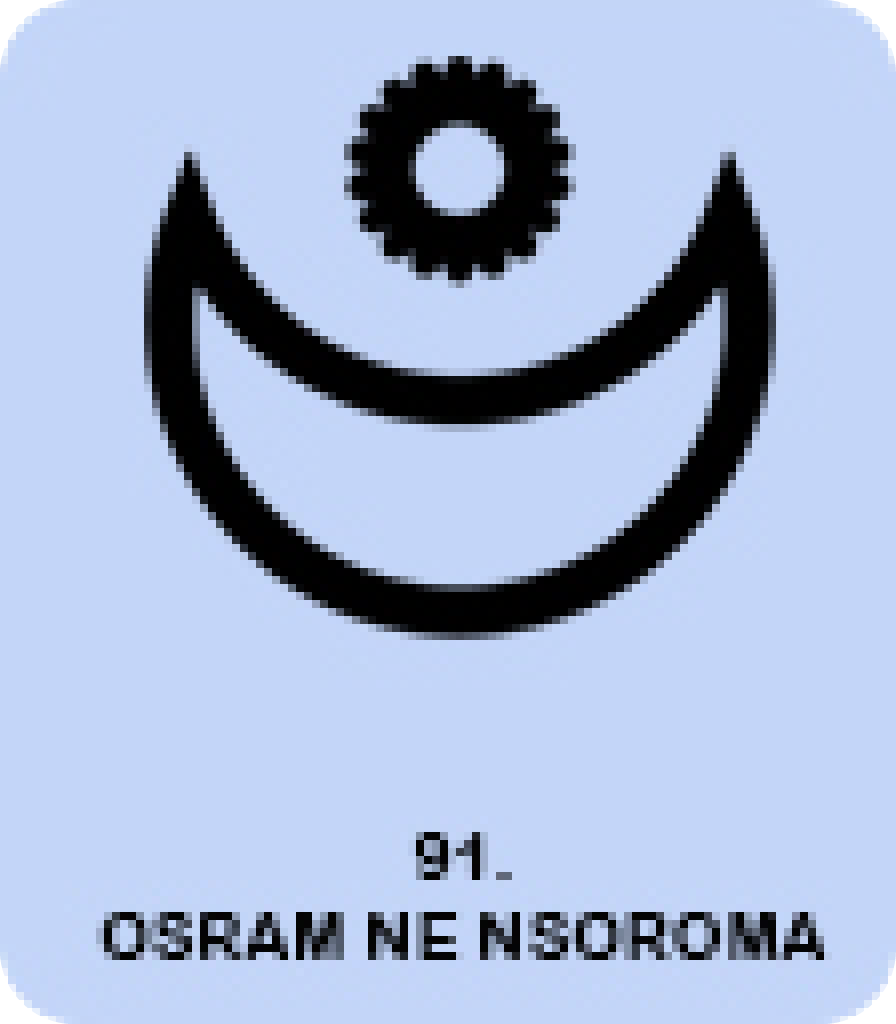
Osram ne nsoroma Logo

Osram ne nsoromma is one of the Bono Adinkra symbols, which is interpreted to mean "Osram" Moon "Ne" and "Nsoromma" Star. This symbol signifies love, bonding and faithfulness in marriage. The symbol is represented by a half moon with a star slightly hanging within the circumference of the moon. Adinkra are symbols that carry a message or a concept. They are very much used by the Bono people of the Bonoman and the Gyaman, an Akan people of Ghana and Côte d'Ivoire. Osram ne nsoromma symbols are incorporated into walls and other architectural features and quite recently has become common with tattoo designers. The most common ways through which the Adinkra messages are carried out or conveyed is having them printed extensively in fabrics and used in pottery.

Adinkra is an Akan name which means farewell or goodbye. Osram ne nsoromma are two different powerful objects of creation put together (Moon and Star). Both co exist in the sky to produce magnificent light or brightness at night. There are some wise sayings closely related to the Osram ne nsoromma symbol, often linked with proverbs

== Related proverbs ==
The Akans of Ghana use an Adinkra symbol to express proverbs and other philosophical ideas or traditional wisdom, aspects of life or the environment.

Some of the familiar proverbs are:

Awaree nye nsafufuo na waka ahwe, which means marriage is not palm-wine that you can decide to have a taste before you get served. It can also be interpreted to mean marriage is not a venture, committee or an organization that you can be a member today and withdraw your membership tomorrow. This proverb frowns upon break ups or separations in marriages or relationships.

Woreko awaree a bisa, This proverb talks about due diligence before marriage. it is wise to do a background check on your partner before marriage or the worse will happen. Making the wrong choice is sometimes costly. Similarly, most of the proverbs seem to put value on the object being addressed. This symbol signifies Love, bonding and faithfulness but one must carefully choose the right partner.

Ahwenepa nkasa, can be interpreted to mean "Ahwenepa"( Good waist beads) "nkasa" (makes no noise). This can be related to mean a good man or a good woman needs no introduction to be known. You can notice them when you find them. This proverb talks about the character of the would be partner. Good man or woman is hard to find but when you meet that special person, you will notice.
