= Japekrom =

- Town and district Capital
- Location of Japekrom in Bono Region
- Coordinates: 7°35′N 2°47′W
- Country: Ghana
- Region: Bono region
- District: Jaman South Municipal
- Elevation: 266 m (873 ft)

Population (2013)
  - Total: 34,107
- Demonym: Japekrom
- Time zone: GMT
  - Summer (DST): GMT

Japekrom is the Municipal Capital of Jaman South Municipality of the Bono Region of Ghana. It has been an important town since the colonial Gold Coast days in Ghana's History, then referred to as Pruano (on the riverbank of Pru-river) but spelled as Pulliano in colonial Gold Coast maps. The Japekromhene is part of Asanteman council. The township was built on a foundation of solid stone and as a result of resistance to any form of suppression or oppression. Traditional leaders of the Japekrom strongly uphold the principles of truth, fairness, hard work, a welcoming heart, inclusion and preservation of culture. The people of Japekrom are very welcoming of people from other tribes and cultures.

The original settlers on the riverbank of Pru (Pruano) prospected for gold and other minerals along the banks of river Pru. Two major rivers in the Japekrom city are Pru and Papasu.

The chiefs and people of Mpuasu-Japekrom Traditional Area are known for the celebration of the annual Munufie Festival (annual yam harvest festival). This is usually celebrated at Japekrom in the last quarter of every year and brings together chiefs, queen mothers, dignitaries and several people (both in Ghana and abroad) to participate and witness the events. It is celebrated to mark the close of the farming season and to set the tone for the commencement of the yet another farming season. It is the major festival of the Mpuasu-Japekrom Traditional Area.

The central point of Japekrom and its environs (including villages within 10 kilometers) has a total population of about 34,107. This implies that a greater portion of the population of the municipality lives around Japekrom. Japekrom has a settlement population of about 34,107.

== Economy ==
Agriculture is the main occupation among the workforce of Japekrom and environs. Aside from peasant farming activities which involve the growing of cassava, maize, yam, and tomatoes, the farmlands of Japekrom are predominantly used in the plantation of cashew which is mainly cultivated as a cash crop.

== Health ==
Japekrom is a host to one of the best Health Centre in Bono region. The Japekrom Health centre has an excellent staff and serves not only Ghanaians but patients from other neighbouring countries like Côte d'Ivoire. It is rated among the top health Centre in Ghana.

== Education ==
In the case of education, Japekrom cannot be left out, with Our Lady of Providence Girls Senior High School located in a suburb of Japekrom (Kwasibuokrom) and Drobo Senior High School also found and located at New Drobo and finally Hidaayah Islamic Senior High School in Japekrom who produces WASSCE Results every year
