= Sungweh Festival =

Festival in Ghana by the people of Sampa

Songhei Festival (Sungweh) is an annual festival celebrated by the chiefs and peoples of Sampa-Jaman in the Bono region, formerly Brong Ahafo Region of Ghana. It is usually celebrated in the months of June or July.

== Celebrations ==
During the festival, visitors are welcomed to share food and drinks. The people put on traditional clothes and there is a durbar of chiefs. There is also dancing and drumming.

== Significance ==
This festival is celebrated to mark an event that took place in the past.
