= Berekum West (Ghana parliament constituency) =

Constituency in the Bono Region of Ghana

- constituency for the Parliament of Ghana
- District: Berekum Municipal District
- Region: Bono Region of Ghana

Current constituency
- Party: National Democratic Congress
- MP: Dickson Kyere Dua

Berekum West (//) is one of the constituencies represented in the Parliament of Ghana. It elects one Member of Parliament (MP) by the first past the post system of election. Dickson Kyere-Duah is the member of parliament for the constituency. Berekum West is located in the Berekum Municipal District of the Bono Region.

== Boundaries ==
The seat is located within the Berekum Municipal District of the Bono Region of Ghana.

== Members of Parliament ==
Election	Member	Party
2016 2012	Kwaku Agyenim Boateng	NPP

== Elections ==
Ghanaian parliamentary election, 2016:Berekum West Source : Peacefmonline
Party	Candidate	Votes	%
NPP	Kwaku Agyenim Boateng	10,289	56.33
NDC	DICKSON KYERE-DUAH	7,860	43.03
PPP	SOLOMON KWADWO AMPONSAH	117	0.64

Ghanaian parliamentary election, 2012:Berekum West Source : Peacefmonline
Party	Candidate	Votes	%
NPP	KWAKU AGYENIM-BOATENG	10,406	57.19
NDC	LORD STEPHEN OPPONG	7,280	40.01
PPP	JUSTICE AMANKONA DIAWUO	220	1.21
URP	HINNE OWUSU FRANK	140	0.77
NDP	KWASI BOAFO	106	0.58
CPP	ATABOADEY CYRIL	45	0.25

== See also ==
- List of Ghana Parliament constituencies
- List of political parties in Ghana
