= New Drobo =

Coordinates: 7°35′N 2°47′W

New Drobo is a populated place in the Jaman South Municipal of the Bono Region of Ghana.
