= Anna Nyamekye =

Ghanaian politician

Hon. Anna Nyamekye

Member of parliament for Jaman South Constituency
- In office 7 January 2005 – 6 January 2009
- President: John Kufuor
- Preceded by: Constituency split
- Succeeded by: Yaw Afful

Member of parliament for Jaman Constituency
- In office 7 January 2001 – 6 January 2005
- President: John Kufuor
- Preceded by: Nicholas Appiah-Kubi
- Succeeded by: Constituency split

Personal details
- Born: 25 November 1954 (age 71)
- Party: New Patriotic Party
- Education: University of Cape Coast
- Profession: Educationist

Anna Nyamekye is a Ghanaian politician and was a member of parliament for the Jaman South constituency of the Brong Ahafo Region of Ghana.

== Early life and education ==
Nyamekye was born on 25 November 1954. She obtained a Bachelor of Arts degree in education at the University of Cape Coast.

== Career ==
Nyamekye is an educationist by profession.

== Political career ==
Nyamekye was a member of parliament representing the Jaman South constituency in the 3rd and 4th parliaments of the 4th republic of Ghana. She was also a deputy minister of food and agriculture. She was the deputy minister in charge of livestock.

=== 2000 elections ===
Nyamekye was first elected as the member of parliament for the Jaman South (formerly Jaman) constituency in the 2000 Ghanaian general elections. She therefore represented the constituency in the 3rd parliament of the 4th republic of Ghana. She was elected with 19,720 votes out of 40,869 total valid votes cast, equivalent to 48.3%. She was elected over Nicholas Appiah-Kubi of the National Democratic Congress, Clement Anane of the National Reform Party, Stephen Kwabena Nkyibena of the Convention People's Party and Fadel Musah Gyasi of the People's National Convention. These obtained 18,807 votes (46%), 1,591 votes (3.9%), 403 votes (1%) and 348 votes (0.9%) respectively. These were equivalent to 46%, 3.9%, 1% and 0.9% of the total valid votes cast. Nyamekye was elected on the ticket of the New Patriotic Party. Her constituency was a part of 14 parliamentary seats out of a total of 21 seats won by the New Patriotic Party in that election in the Brong Ahafo Region of Ghana. The electorate in that constituency voted in "skirt and blouse" manner as the presidential candidate that won was from the major opposition party National Democratic Congress. In all, the New Patriotic Party, though, won 100 parliamentary seats out of 200 .

=== 2004 elections ===
Nyamekye was re-elected as the member of parliament for the Jaman South constituency in the 2004 Ghanaian general election. She thus represented the constituency in the 4th parliament of the 4th republic. She was elected with 17,842votes out of 31,219 total valid votes cast, equivalent to 57.2%. She was elected over Osei Koranteng of People's National Convention, Ahmed Shams Dinu of the National Democratic Congress, Oteng Agyeman Jacob of the Convention People's Party and Oppong Kwabena Martin of the Democratic People's Party, who obtained, respectively, 782 votes (2.5%), 12,085 votes (38.7%), 337 votes (1.1%) and 173 votes (0.6%). Nyamekye was elected again on the ticket of the New Patriotic Party. Her constituency was a part of 14 parliamentary seats out of a total of 24 won by the New Patriotic Party in the Brong Ahafo region of Ghana in that elections. In all, the New Patriotic Party won a majority of 114 out of a total 230 seats.

== Personal life ==
Nyamekye is a Christian.
