= Sky FM (Ghana) =

Radio station in Sunyani, Ghana

- Sunyani; Ghana
- Broadcast area: Bono Region
- Frequency: 96.7 MHz

Programming
- Language: English
- Format: Local and International news, talk, sports, politics, culture and music

Ownership
- Owner: Sky Broadcasting Limited

History
- First air date: 1997

Links
- Website: www.skyfmonline.com

Programs

Sky FM is a privately owned urban radio station in Sunyani, the capital of Bono Region in Ghana. Sky Broadcasting Limited owns and runs the station. The station was adjudged the Best Morning Show (English) category in the maiden edition of the B/A GJA Awards ceremony in Ghana. The station broadcasts in traditional FM stereo.

== Present and past workers ==
- Jeffery Boakye Amankwaah (DJ Floopy)
- Osei Kojo Nathaniel (Emcee Nice)
- Joshua Kwadwo Kyere
- Lawrence Yeboah (DJ Prym)
- Christopher Tetteh
- Priscilla Oppong Fosu
- Victor Ferkah
