= Kwaku Boateng =

Kwaku Boateng may refer to:

- Kwaku Boateng (high jumper) (born 1974), Canadian high jumper
- Kwaku Boateng (politician) (c.1926–2006), cabinet minister in Ghana in the early 1960s
- Kwaku Boateng (Canadian football) (born 1995), Canadian football player
- Kwaku Agyenim Boateng (born 1972), Ghanaian politician
