= Rissiana =

Village in Faisalabad, Pakistan

Rissiana is a village situated near Samundri, in Faisalabad District, of Punjab, Pakistan. There are actually two villages named Rissiana in this area; Rissiana Kalan (Bara Rissiana) and Rissiana Khurd (Chota Rissiana). Both have the same village number (138 GB) and are located two kilometers apart. Rissiana used to be called Kesgarh, and this name is still used in many official documents. The following details represent the demographics of Rissiana Khurd. Before the partition of the subcontinent in 1947, The village of Rissiana existed with Sikh majority.

== Demographics ==
The population of the village, according to 2017 census was 6,134.

== Literacy ==
The literacy rate is about 75% and the younger generation is much committed for higher education for which they have to travel to big cities.

== Economy ==
The economy of Rissiana is mainly based upon agriculture. The land of Rissiana is very fertile, but the subsoil water is brackish, forcing farmers to rely upon a meager canal supply which is meager. For this reason, Rissiana has seen a major decline in agriculture. However, sufficient wheat, maize, sugarcane, guavas, Kinnow, jaman, and fodder are produced here. These crops both satisfy the local needs and are sold in the grain market of nearby Samundri. The younger generations of Rissiana increasingly leave the area and move to cities to find employment and higher education opportunities. The area around Rissiana is irrigated by a distributary of British-built Canal 'Gogera Branch' that is also abbreviated as GB. Hence, the official number of village is 138 GB.

== Ethnic makeup ==
Nearly all the inhabitants of Rissiana Khurd migrated to Punjab, India. Majority, people belonging to major castes are living in this village. These three castes include Rajput, Jutt, and Gujjar. Besides the majority of Muslims inhabitants, there are also living a few Christians in the village.

== Infrastructure ==
Rissiana has one primary school for boys and one middle school for girls, paved roads, telephone and power lines, four mosques and a filtration plant for the supply of clean drinking water. The towers of various mobile operators are located in Rissiana which help the local people to remain in touch with their beloved ones.
