= Jacob Larweh =

Ghanaian footballer (born 1996)

Personal information
- Full name: Jacob Larweh
- Date of birth: 7 September 1996 (age 30)
- Place of birth: Odumase, Ghana
- Height: 1.72 m (5 ft 7 1/2 in)
- Position: Left-back

Team information
- Current team: Tema Youth SC
- Number: 33

Youth career
- 2004–2009: Revelation FC

Senior career*
Years	Team	Apps	(Gls)
2004–2009	Revelation FC	67	(11)
2010–	Tema Youth SC	105	(30)

International career
2012/2013	Black Starlets	3	(0)
2016/2017	Black Stars B	3	(0)
- * Club domestic league appearances and goals as of 25 June 2017

Jacob Larweh (born 7 September 1996) is a Ghanaian footballer who plays as a left-back for Tema Youth SC.

== Club career ==
Larweh started playing for local youth side Revelation Fc, and made his debuts for the club in 2004. He left Revelations Fc in 2009 to sign for Tema Youth SC. Larweh became the captain of Tema Youth SC during the 2014/2015 season. Larweh also got a call up to the Black Stars B squad

In January 2018, Jacob Larweh was linked to local giants Accra Hearts of Oak but a deal could not be struck so he stayed at Tema Youth
