= Berekum Municipal District =

- Former Municipal District
- Districts of Brong-Ahafo Region

- Location of Berekum Municipal District within Brong-Ahafo
- Coordinates: 7°27′N 2°35′W
- Country: Ghana
- Region: Brong-Ahafo
- Capital: Berekum

Population (2012)
  - Total: —
- Time zone: UTC+0 (GMT)

Berekum Municipal District is a former district located in Brong-Ahafo Region (now currently in Bono Region), Ghana. It was originally created as an ordinary district assembly on 10 March 1989, when it was known as Berekum District, which was created from the former Berekum-Jaman District Council. Later it was elevated to municipal district assembly status on 29 February 2008 to become Berekum Municipal District. However, on 15 March 2018, it was split off into two new districts: Berekum East Municipal District (capital: Berekum) and Berekum West District (capital: Jinijini). The municipality was located in the western part of Brong-Ahafo Region (now western part of Bono Region) and had Berekum as its capital town.
