= Williams Okofo-Dateh =

Ghanaian politician

Hon. Williams Okofo-Dateh
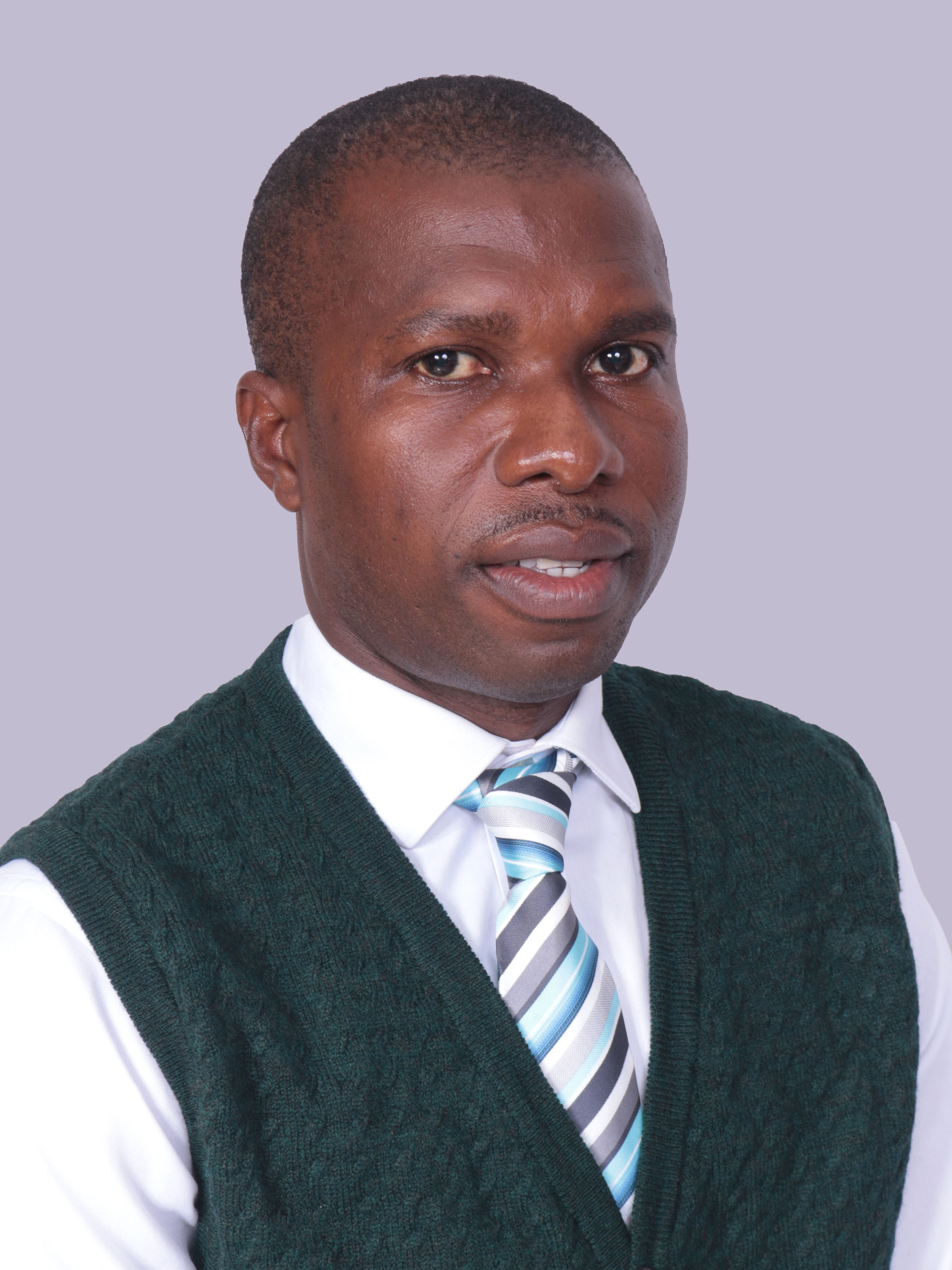

Member of Parliament for Jaman South Constituency
- Incumbent
- Assumed office 7 January 2021
- Preceded by: Yaw Afful

Personal details
- Born: Williams Okofo-Dateh; 15 October 1981 (age 44) Drobo Faaman, Ghana
- Party: National Democratic Congress
- Occupation: Politician
- Committees: Judiciary Committee, Foreign Affairs Committee

Williams Okofo-Dateh is a Ghanaian politician and member of parliament for the Jaman South constituency in the Bono region of Ghana.

== Early life and education ==
Williams was born on 15 October 1981 and hails from Drobo Faaman in the Bono region of Ghana. He had his basic education in 1993 and had his SSSCE in General Arts in 1996. He also had his certificate in Education in 2001 and his Degree in Education in Population and Family Life in 2007 and further had his master's degree in International Relations and Aid in 2010.

== Career ==
Williams is a farmer.

=== Political career ===
He is a member of NDC and currently the MP for Jaman South Constituency. He won the parliamentary seat with 24,422 votes whilst the incumbent Yaw Afful had 22,519 votes and the CPP parliamentary aspirant Samuel Boadu had 165 votes.

=== Committees ===
He is a member of the Judiciary Committee and also a member of the Foreign Affairs Committee.

== Personal life ==
Williams is a Christian.

== Philanthropy ==
In June 2021, Williams started a rice production project in the Jaman South constituency to engage youth in the cultivation of rice using modern farming technologies, marketing and packaging innovations. He presented 33 bags of 45 kilograms of rice seeds, a box of Wellington boots and three boxes of weedicide to the Aboukrom Rice Farmers Association.
