= Suma-Ahenkro =

- Country: Ghana
- Region: Bono Region

Suma-Ahenkro is a town in the Bono Region of Ghana. It is the capital town of Suma Traditional area. The town is known for the Sumaman Senior High School. The Suma Traditional Area is one of the notable traditional areas in the Bono Region of Ghana. It is one of the core states of the traditional Gyaaman Kingdom that exist in parts of the Republics of Ghana and La Côte d'Ivoire. Administratively the traditional area is located in the Jaman (Gyaaman) North District of the Bono Region. There are many tourist attractions in the Suma area. These include festivals and other traditional ceremonies, music and dance, ancient relics, artifacts and historical sites.

School. The school is a second cycle institution.

== Festival ==
The people of Suma Ahenkro celebrate the Munufie Festival, also known as the Yam Festival, to showcase their rich culture, unity, and ancestral heritage. The festival marks the end of the harvest season and the beginning of a new one, with gratitude to the gods and ancestors for a bountiful yield.

During the celebration, traditional drumming, dancing, and colourful durbars of chiefs take centre stage, with people dressed in regal kente and smocks. The event also serves as a homecoming for citizens living elsewhere and a platform to discuss the development of the Suma Traditional Area.
