= Kwaku Agyenim Boateng =

Ghanaian politician

Hon. Kwaku Agyenim-Boateng
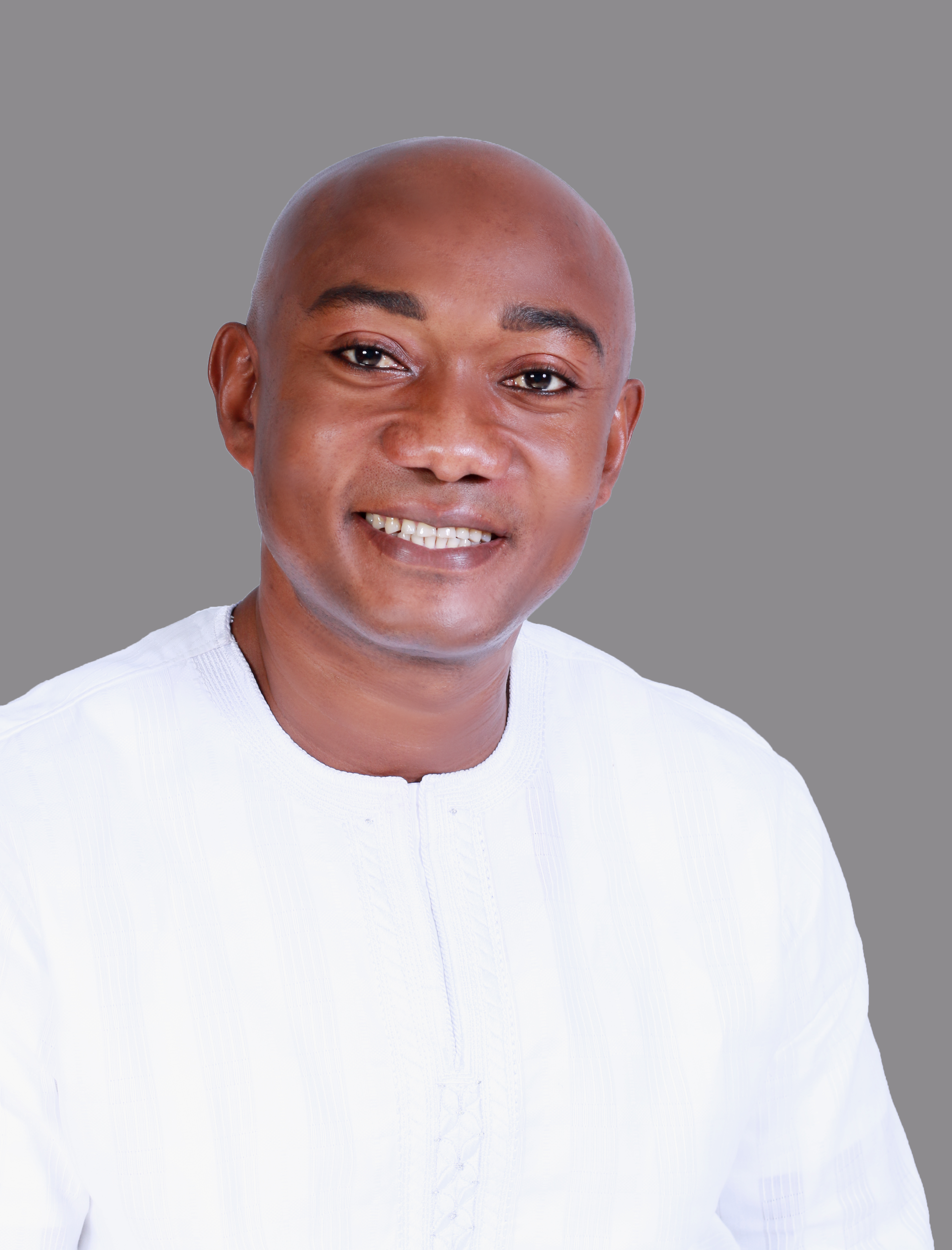

Member of Parliament for Berekum West constituency
- Incumbent
- Assumed office 7 January 2021

Personal details
- Born: Kwaku Agyenim-Boateng; 1 November 1972 (age 53) Jinijini, Ghana
- Party: New Patriotic Party
- Occupation: Politician
- Profession: Legal Service Consultant
- Committees: Employment, Social Welfare and State Enterprises Committee; Poverty Reduction Strategy Committee

Kwaku Agyenim-Boateng (born 1 November 1972) is a Ghanaian politician and served as a member of the Eighth Parliament of the Fourth Republic of Ghana representing the Berekum West constituency in the Bono Region on the ticket of the New Patriotic Party.

== Education ==
He obtained his Bachelor of Science degree in Planning from Kwame Nkrumah University of Science and Technology in 1997. He pursued his Masters of Science in Public Policy and Management at the University of London in 2008. He also holds a Post Graduate Certificate in Law from the Anglia Ruskin University, in UK 2004 and L.L.B. (GIMPA) in 2014.

== Early life ==
Boateng was born on 1 November 1972, in the town of Jinijini in the Bono Region, then Brong Ahafo Region.

== Political career ==
Boateng is a member of the New Patriotic Party (NPP). He was first elected into Parliament in January 2009 after he emerged winner in the 2008 Ghanaian General Election. He was then re-elected into the 6th and 7th Parliament. He defeated his opposition with 56.33% of the total valid votes after the 2016 Ghanaian general election. He again won the 2020 Ghanaian general elections with 11,245 votes making 47% of the total votes cast whilst the NDC parliamentary candidate Dickson Kyere-Duah had 10,296 votes making 43% of the total votes cast and an Independent candidate Derrick Obeng Mensah had 2,395 votes making 10% of the total votes cast. He was the former Deputy Minister for Railways Development.

=== Committees ===
He is a member of the Employment, Social Welfare and State Enterprises Committee and also a member of the Poverty Reduction Strategy Committee.

== Employment ==
Boateng worked as a development planner and a Legal Service Consultant from1998 to 2008.

== Personal life ==
Boateng is a Christian.

== Philanthropy ==
In January 2020, he commissioned a maternity ward and donated medical items for the Nkyekyemamu Health Center in the Berekum West District. He also presented hospital beds, weighing machine, office chairs, television etc to Amankwokwa Community-based Health Planning and Services.
