= Jaman South (Ghana parliament constituency) =

Constituency in the Bono Region of Ghana

- constituency for the Parliament of Ghana
- Region: Bono Region of Ghana

Current constituency
- Party: New Patriotic Party
- MP: Kwadwo Damoah

Jaman South is a municipal area with 130 settlements, and a total population of 114,257. However, the voting population is a fraction of this. The current MP for this constituency is Kwadwo Damoah of the New Patriotic Party. He succeeded Yaw Afful.

== History ==
Afful Yaw Maama was the member of parliament for the constituency in 2008. He was elected on the ticket of the New Patriotic Party (NPP) won a majority of 6,506 votes to become the MP. He succeeded Anna Nyamekye who had represented the constituency in the 4th Republic parliament also on the ticket of the New Patriotic Party (NPP).

== Members of Parliament ==
First elected	Member	Party	Term
2004	Anna Nyamekye	New Patriotic Party	2004 – 2008
2008	Yaw Afful	New Patriotic Party	2008 – 2012
2012	Anna Nyamekye	New Patriotic Party	
2020	Williams Okofo-Dateh	National Democratic Congress	2021 - date

== See also ==
- List of Ghana Parliament constituencies
