= Berekum East Municipal District =

Municipal District in Bono Region, Ghana

Berekum East Municipal District District Municipal de Berekum-Est
- Municipal District
- Nickname: Golden City (French: Ville d'Or)
- Districts of Bono Region

- Location of Berekum East Municipal District within Bono Region
- Coordinates: 7°27′N 2°35′W
- Country: Ghana
- Region: Bono Region
- Capital: Berekum

Government
  - Municipal Chief Executive: Mr. Kofi Agyei

Area
  - Total: 955 km^{2} (369 sq mi)

Population (2021)
  - Total: 106,252
- Time zone: UTC+0 (GMT)
- Website: Berekum East Municipal District Official Website

Berekum East Municipal District is one of the twelve districts in Bono Region, Ghana. Originally it was formerly part of the then-larger Berekum District on 10 March 1989, which was created from the former Berekum-Jaman District Council. It was later upgraded to municipal district assembly status and has been renamed as Berekum Municipal District on 29 February 2008; until the western part of the district was split off to create Berekum West District on 15 March 2018; thus the remaining part has been renamed as Berekum East Municipal District. The municipality is located in the western part of Bono Region and has Berekum as its capital town.

== List of settlements ==
Settlements of Berekum East Municipal District
No.	Settlement	Population	Population year
1	Abisaase		
2	Adom		
3	Akroforo		
4	Amomaso		
5	Anyimon		
6	Benkasa		
7	Benkasem		
8	Berekum	60,473	2012
9	Biadan		
10	Botokrom		
11	Domfete		
12	Fetentaa		
13	Jamdede		
14	Jinijini		
15	Kato		
16	Koraso		
17	Kutre No. 1 & 2		
18	Mpatapo		
19	Mpatasie		
20	Namasua		
21	Nansuano		
22	Nsapor		
23	Oforikrom		
24	Senase		

== Sources ==
- "Berekum Municipal District". Statoids.
- District: Berekum Municipal District
