= Berekum East =

Constituency in the Bono Region of Ghana

- constituency for the Parliament of Ghana
- District: Berekum Municipal District
- Region: Bono Region of Ghana

Current constituency
- Party: National Democratic Congress
- MP: Simon Ampaabeng Kyeremeh

Berekum East (//) is one of the constituencies represented in the Parliament of Ghana. It elects one Member of Parliament (MP) by the first past the post system of election. Berekum East is found in the Bono Region of Ghana.

The member of parliament for this constituency is Simon Ampaabeng Kyeremeh.
