= Berekum-Jaman District =

- Former District Council
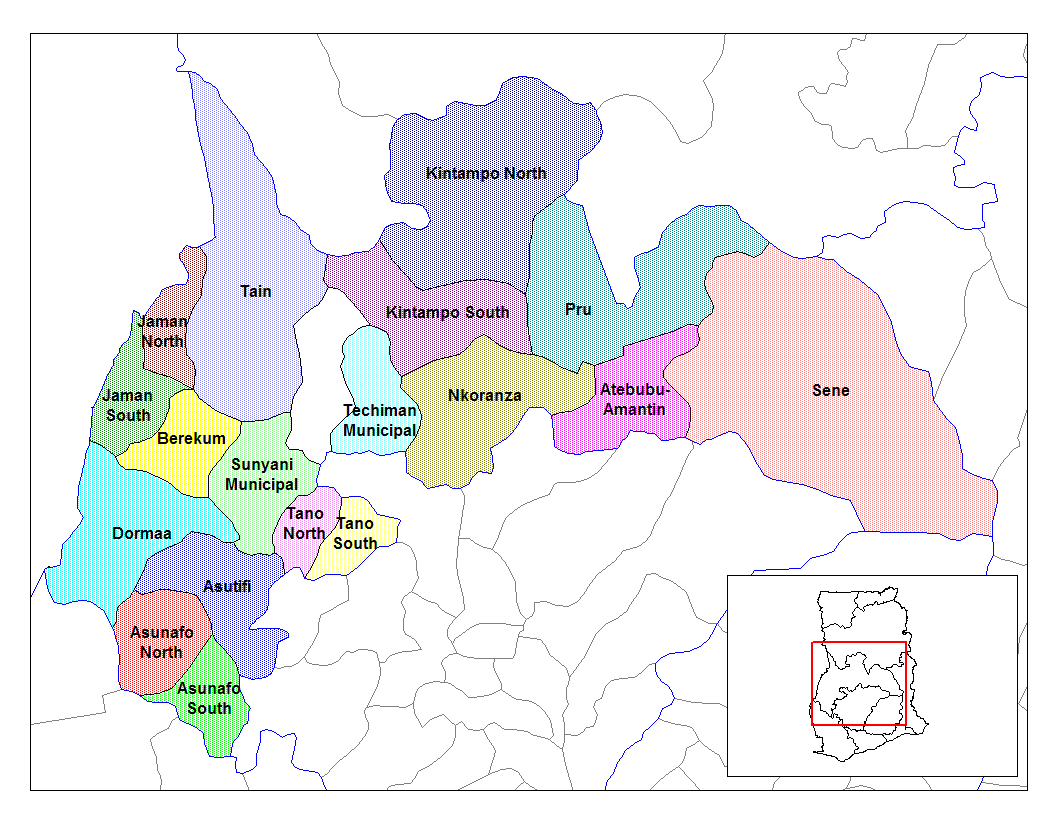
- Districts of Brong-Ahafo Region

- Location of Berekum-Jaman within Brong-Ahafo
- Coordinates: 7°27′N 2°35′W
- Country: Ghana
- Region: Brong-Ahafo
- Capital: Berekum

Area
  - Total: 2,331 km^{2} (900 sq mi)

Population (2012)
  - Total: —
- Time zone: UTC+0 (GMT)

Berekum-Jaman District is a former district council that was located in Brong-Ahafo Region (now currently in Bono Region), Ghana. Originally created as an ordinary district assembly in 1975. However in 10 March 1989, it was split off into two new district assemblies: Berekum District (capital: Berekum) and Jaman District (capital: Drobo). The district assembly was located in the western part of Brong-Ahafo Region (now western part of Bono Region) and had Berekum as its capital town.

== Sources ==
- "Berekum-Jaman District". Statoids.
- District: Berekum-Jaman District
