= Nsoatre =

Town in Bono Region, Ghana

- Sunyani West Municipal Assembly
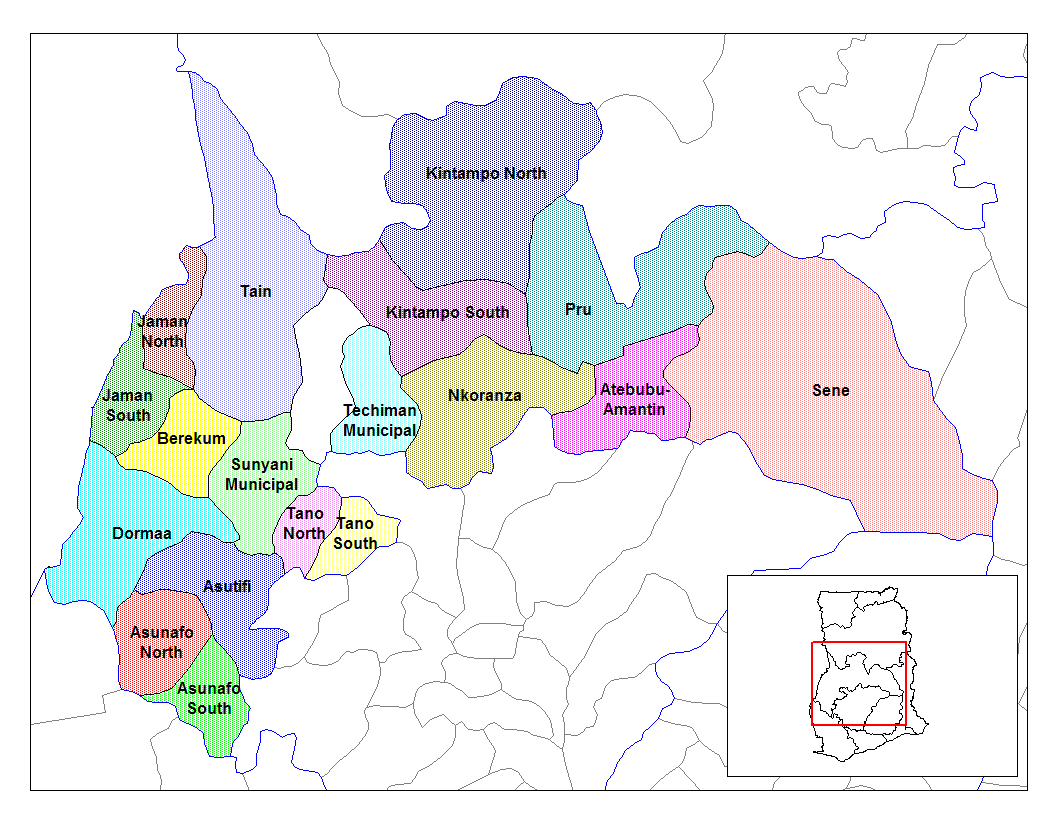
- Location of Nsoatre in Bono region

- Location within Ghana
- Coordinates: 7.402°N 2.464°W
- Country: Ghana
- Region: Bono region
- Capital: Odomase

Government
  - Type: Municipal Assembly
  - Municipal Chief Executive: Hon. Martin Obeng
  - Municipal Coordinating Director: Mr. Philip D. Baazeng
- Time zone: UTC+0 (Greenwich Mean Time)
  - Summer (DST): GMT

Nsoatre is a town in the Bono region of Ghana. The town is known for the Sacred Heart Secondary School. The school is a second cycle institution.
