= Jaman, Iran =

Jaman جعمان
- Village
- Location within Iran
- Coordinates: 31°54′53″N 50°43′23″E
- Country: Iran
- Province: Chaharmahal and Bakhtiari
- County: Kiar
- Bakhsh: Naghan
- Rural District: Naghan

Population (2006)
  - Total: 239
- Time zone: UTC+3:30 (IRST)
  - Summer (DST): UTC+4:30 (IRDT)

Jaman (Persian: جعمان, also Romanized as Jaʿmān; also known as Jahmān) is a village in Naghan Rural District, Naghan District, Kiar County, Chaharmahal and Bakhtiari Province, Iran. At the 2006 census, its population was 239, in 62 families. The village is populated by Lurs.
