= Akwantukese Festival =

Festival in Ghana by the people of New Juaben

Akwantukese Festival is a festival celebrated by the people of New Juaben traditional area in the Eastern Region of Ghana. It is celebrated to mark the epic journey of the people from Juaben in the Ashanti Region of Ghana.

They settled not only with their history but the earnest desire to replicate or emulate some communities from their former home in Juaben. Just as there is Oyoko, Asokore, Effiduase and Koforidua in the currently known Ashanti Region, some towns in Koforidua are known to have such names.

== History ==
The Akwantukese Festival commemorates the great migration of the Juabens and their allies from their ancestral homes in Asante to establish the New Juaben settlement in the Eastern Region specifically in Koforidua some 135 years ago. They were led by one Asafo Adjei. This festival signifies hope and unity for the people of New Juaben.
