= Jenini =

Jenini Slave Camp
- Jenini Slave Camp
- 7°40′N 2°40′W
- Location: Jaman North District, Ghana

Jenini was a slave camp in Ghana during Samory Toure’s reign c. 1870 - 1895. Archaeological excavations at Jenini began in July 2004, with a goal to better understand the lives of its enslaved occupants. Jenini remains a salient reminder of Africa's involvement in the trans-Atlantic slave trade.

== The occupants of Jenini ==
Enslaved peoples were brought to Jenini from different areas. People entered slavery by being captured, purchased, or born into slavery. Enslaved people would live in their master’s compound (in a special section), while some may have lived in a separate village/hamlet. In some cases, enslaved people could receive religious education (a few prayers if they were Muslim) and enough education to participate in the community’s religious life. Enslaved people could purchase their own freedom; they could also farm their own land if permitted. Enslaved peoples found roles in militaries, agriculture, craft production, smith, trade, and leather work. Samory Toure, a Mandinka warrior, established slave camps, like Jenini, in Ghana between 1870 and 1895. He is known for resisting French colonization during the nineteenth century. He built an empire covering parts of Bamako, Mali, Burkina Faso, La Coté d’Ivoire, and Ghana, and Sudan. His military operations affected large areas that encompassed different ecological, ethnic and linguistic zones. Toure’s activities took place alongside during the Trans-Atlantic slave trade. ( Samory Touré’s activities couldn’t have taken place alongside the transatlantic slave trade. Samory was born around 1830 in what is now Guinea and founded his kingdom around 1870 in Guinea. Jenini is about 800 km from Guinea and Samory only was in the area around Jenini in the 1890’s. By that time, even the clandestine transatlantic slave trade, after the official ending, was over. The last official slave ship left the coasts of Africa in 1860)

== Archaeology ==
Sourcing of ceramics found during archaeological investigations at Jenini was done using instrumental neutron activation analysis and Compton suppression spectrometry. The team, B.J.B Nyarko et al., used 26 pottery sherds for samples from tombs, excavated in July 2004. The pottery sherds, that were used to analyze, were taken from three spots from the site, Trench 1, Trench 2, and Pit 1. Their geochemical signatures are similar, demonstrating they are made of the same raw material or of raw material with similar geochemical compositions. Evidence suggests that the enslaved people, held at the camp, used clay from the same source for their pottery.

The neutron activation analysis supports though the enslaved people came from many different regions, they made pottery from a similar geographical source. This study is important to understand the lives of the occupiers at Jenini. It is one of the first steps to understand the ceramic production of the occupants. Also, this study helped inspire other archaeological research, for example looking at ancient pottery from the Accra region of Ghana. The researcher used 40 pottery sherds to identify pottery types or groups that can be differentiated from other groups to reveal meaningful archaeological interpretation. Because of this method, the researchers were able to deduce that their designated sites, Ayawaso and Shai, produced their own pots while Wullf, another site, purchased their pots from the two sites.

Though there has been little other research at Jenini thus far, archaeological research on the history of slavery in western Africa has expanded greatly in recent years. Jenini's preservation and excavation can thus be compared to that at Elmina, a port on the Ghanaian coast central to the West African slave trade. Fifteen years of archaeological research have been conducted at Elmina. Goals have been to understand everyday life in the African settlement, as well as to contextualize Elmina in broader terms of European expansion and social change. Much of the excavation was focused on the peninsula, and though the site has been impacted by recent development many areas are well preserved. Unlike at Jenini, over 6,000 sherds of imported ceramics were recovered at the site, along with a large number of locally produced ceramics. There are documentary records that made references to cloth, showing trade in this region, though cloth does not survive well archaeologically in humid climates. Though the Portuguese were the first European colonizers in the area, the settlement expanded under Dutch rule. Though documentary sources help mark the boundaries of the settlement, it is difficult to determine the social, economic, and cultural variables that influenced the organization of the settlement.

== Preservation and issues surrounding the camps ==
Slave camps and markets in the Bolgatanga region of the western African interior serve as a reminder of the slave trade. In the Ghanaian news media, historian Akosua Perbi has said there are mass graves at Jenini that still need to be excavated. Perbi stated that people have found human bones lying outside houses that had been built on the site: "As people sweep their compounds, they could see frames of skulls on the ground, and whenever it rains, a lot of bones are washed away." Perbi and archaeologist Yaw Bredwan-Mensah are seeing through the preservation of the burial mounds.

The topic of domestic slavery in Africa is not often talked about among local populations but is well known in academic work. There is a controversial silence about some Africans’ involvement in the Atlantic slave trade. Descendants of individuals involved are often stigmatized and many have changed their names to bury the past. The colonial period in Africa is still recent, and the effects and memories are still fresh. There were, however, African societies that resisted internal and external forces and protected their communities from the trade.

== Another place named Jenini ==
Sir Philip Brocklehurst mentioned a town named Jenini (today Geneina) in Darfur, Sudan.
