= Yaw Afful =

Ghanaian politician (born 1959)

Hon. Yaw Afful
- Constituency: Jaman South

Member of Parliament
- In office 7 January 2009 – 6 January 2012
- President: John Atta Mills
- Preceded by: Anna Nyamekye

Personal details
- Born: 3 June 1959 (age 67)
- Party: New Patriotic Party
- Children: 3
- Education: Kennesaw State University, Atlanta, USA
- Occupation: Businessman

Yaw Maama Afful (born 10 June 1959) is a Ghanaian politician and member of the Fifth and Seventh Parliament of the Fourth Republic of Ghana representing the Jaman South Constituency in the Brong-Ahafo Region on the ticket of the New Patriotic Party.

== Early life and education ==
Afful was born on 10 June 1959. He hails from Mpuasu, a town in the Brong Ahafo Region of Ghana. He entered Kennesaw State University, Atlanta, USA, and obtained his Bachelor of Arts degree in International Affairs and Political Science in 1997.

== Career ==
Afful was the CEO of EO, Kids Heaven Learning Centre in Aworth, Atlanta, in the US. He is a businessman.

== Politics ==
Afful is a member of the New Patriotic Party (NPP). In 2008, he was elected on the ticket of the New Patriotic Party as the Member of Parliament for the Jaman South Constituency. He thus represented the constituency in the 5th, 6th, and 7th parliament of the 4th republic of Ghana.

=== 2008 election ===
Afful contested the Jaman South constituency parliamentary seat on the ticket of New Patriotic Party during the 2008 Ghanaian general election and won with 16,878 votes out of the 30,266 valid votes cast equivalent to 55.77% of total valid votes cast. He won against Ofori Aikins of the People's National Convention, Peter Kwabena Ankomah of the National Democratic Congress, Jacob Oteng-Ahyemang of the Convention People's Party and Kwadwo Boakye Djan an independent candidate. These obtained 0.75%, 34.27%, 0.44% and 8.77% respectively of total valid votes cast. He contested again for the Jaman South North seat on the ticket of the NPP for the Member of Parliament seat in the sixth parliament of the fourth republic and won.

==== 2012 election ====
Afful was re-elected as a member of parliament for Jaman South constituency on the ticket of New Patriotic Party during the 2012 Ghanaian general election with 22, 835 votes representing 57.81% of the total votes. He was elected over Kojo Boakye Djan of National Democratic Congress who polled 16, 123 votes which is equivalent to 40.82%, parliamentary candidate for PPP Kyere Diabour Amankona had 403 votes representing 1.02%, parliamentary candidate for PNC Ofori Emmanuel Aikins had 82 votes representing 0.21% and Agyenim Boateng John of NDP had 57 votes representing 0.14% of the total votes.

=== 2016 election ===
Afful was again elected as a member of parliament for Jaman South (Ghana parliament constituency) during the 2016 Ghanaian general election with 24,616 votes representing 64.86% of the total votes. He won the election over Kojo Boakye Djan of National Democratic Congress, Joyce Asare Bediako of NDP, David Awupori Vugushe of PPP, Osei Kyereme Emmanuel of Convention People's Party and Addai Daniel of PNC. They obtained 12, 777 votes, 197 votes, 189 votes, 95 votes and 72 votes respectively. These is equivalent to 33.67%, 0.52%, 0.50%, 0.25% and 0.19% of the total votes respectively.

==== 2020 election ====
Afful lost the Jaman South constituency parliamentary seat to Williams Okofo- Dateh of National Democratic Congress during the 2020 Ghanaian general election.

== Personal life ==
Afful is a Christian (Presbyterian). He is married (with three children).
