= Kingdom of Gyaman =

Former Akan polity in Ghana and Cote d'Ivoire

Kingdom of Gyaman Gyaman (Gyaaman) Jamang (Jaman)
- 17th century
- Status: Former kingdom
- Capital: Amanvi (Ceremonial); Sampa; Bonduku(Administrative/commercial center)
- Common languages: Twi; Ligbi; Kulango; Dyula
- Religion: Akan religion Islam (minority)
- Government: Monarchy
- Gyamanhene
  - c. 1800–1818: Kwadwo Adinkra
- History
  - Establishment of Gyaman Kingdom: 17th century
  - Subjugation by the Asante Empire: 1740
  - End of Asante control and brief independence: 1875
  - Dissolution into British Gold Coast (eastern territories): 1895
  - Dissolution into French West Africa (western territories): 1897
  - Renamed Jaman North and Jaman South of Brong-Ahafo: 1957
- Currency: Gold dust cowrie shells Salt; Copper
Preceded by
Akwamu Empire
Begho
Bonoman
Succeeded by
Brong-Ahafo Region
Zanzan District
- Today part of: Ghana; Ivory Coast

Gyaman (also spelled Gyaaman or Jamang, and later known as Jaman) was a precolonial Akan kingdom that was located in parts of present-day Ghana and Ivory Coast. It was established by the Aduana clan from Dormaa. Gyaman evolved by extending its authority across the Banda, Jaman North, Jaman South, and Bonduku regions. It is closely associated in oral tradition with the origin of Adinkra symbols, which are now central to Akan philosophy and visual culture. The kingdom was a cultural and political crossroads between the Akan, Gur, and Mande-speaking regions, facilitating trade, diplomacy, and cultural exchange across the forest–savannah frontier. Its history was shaped by conflict with the Asante Empire and the eventual partition of its territory between the British Gold Coast and French West Africa in the late 19th century.

== History ==
=== Origins ===
In the 17th century, migrants from the Aduana clan moved northwest following succession disputes within the Akwamu state. The migrants became known as the Dormaa, initially settled around Suntreso and Asantemanso before expanding into the Black Volta basin. From there, they began incorporating surrounding populations like the Kulango, Nafana, Ligbi, and Hwela, into a centralized Akan polity. The process marked the formation of the Gyaman kingdom, with royal authority centered at Amanvi and political control extending across regions such as Banda, Jaman, and Bonduku. The decline of Begho and the destruction of Bono-Manso in the early 18th century catalyzed major political realignments in the region.

=== The First Gyaman–Asante War ===
In the 18th century, Gyaman became a recurring center of resistance to the expanding authority of the Asante Empire. The Asante launched multiple campaigns against Gyaman, which strategically lay along the gold-bearing Black Volta corridor and the northwestern trade frontier. After intermittent conflicts beginning in the reign of Opoku Ware, Asante forces decisively defeated Gyaman and destroyed its capital in 1740–1741, reducing the kingdom to a tributary status.

=== The Second Gyaman–Asante War and the Legacy of Kwadwo Adinkra ===
Kwadwo Adinkra came to power around 1800. While early accounts portrayed him as a client of the Asante court or even an Asante prince imposed on Gyaman, later investigations confirm that he belonged to the indigenous Yakaase ruling line, one of two royal dynasties that alternated succession in Gyaman. His early reign was marked by close cooperation with the Asantehene, to whom he paid tribute and military support.

Adinkra actively supported Asante military campaigns in the northwest, including the wars against Gonja and Bouna. His loyalty was such that while he was away assisting Asante, some Gyaman factions attempted to replace him with a rival from the Zanzan dynasty. Adinkra responded by crushing the internal revolt with a large contingent of troops from Kumasi. However, relations with Asante began to deteriorate by 1817. Citing grievances over Asante interference and tribute demands, Adinkra ceased tribute payments and declared independence.

In 1818, the Asantehene Osei Tutu Kwamina Asibey Bonsu responded with a full-scale military invasion. Adinkra was killed, though oral traditions differ on whether he was executed, killed in battle, or committed suicide. In one account, he hid his regalia and took his own life to avoid capture; in another, his son Apau revealed his grave under torture. Asante forces recovered what they believed to be Adinkra's remains and brought them to Kumasi. An effigy of his head became part of the Asantehene's stool regalia. The war did not end with his death. Loyalists regrouped with support from Kong and resumed fighting, forcing the Asantehene to remain in Gyaman for over a year. In 1819, Asante declared Gyaman a province rather than a tributary state, imposed a military occupation, and barred direct trade between Gyaman and the coast.

Adinkra's rebellion, though militarily unsuccessful, left an enduring cultural legacy. The symbolic cloths he commissioned were appropriated by the Asante and integrated into royal and funerary traditions. Over time, these symbols, originally signifiers of resistance, became standardized as Adinkra symbols.

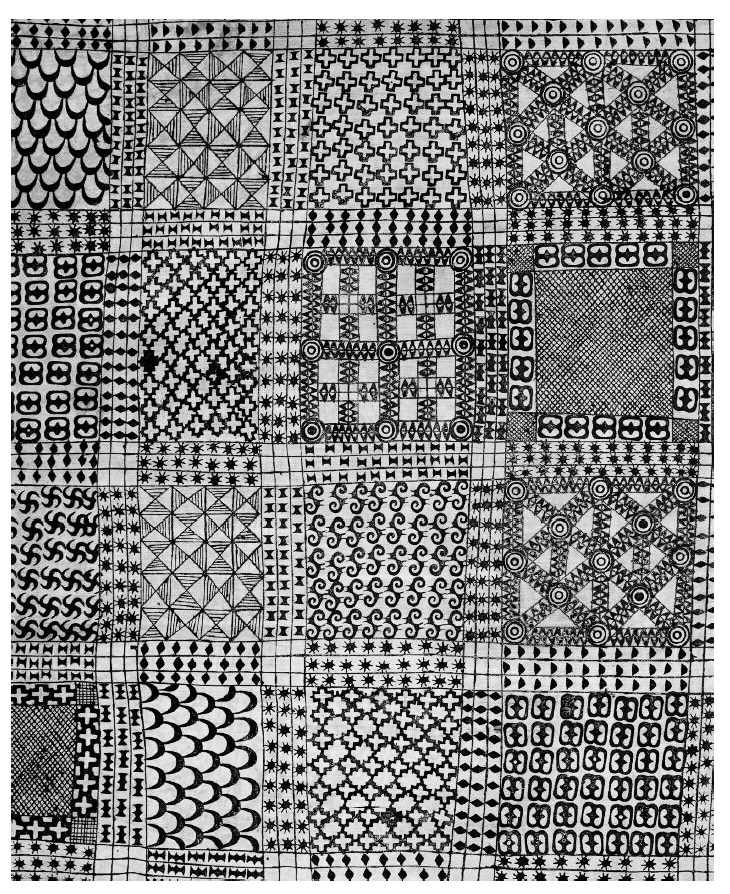
1817 Adinkra mourning cloth

=== Renewed Resistance and external Encroachment ===
After decades under Asante dominance, Gyaman experienced a revival of political autonomy in the wake of Asante's internal decline following the British invasion of Kumasi in 1874. The weakening of Asante authority created opportunities for Bono states including Gyaman, Techiman, and Dormaa to reassert independence. Gyaman reemerged as a regional power, forming loose alliances with neighboring polities and engaging in anti-Asante resistance, particularly in coordination with the state of Kong.

During this period, Gyaman's leadership also engaged with growing French colonial interests in the western Sudan. In 1888, the Gyamanhene signed a treaty of protection with France, hoping to secure military backing against both Asante and British interference. However, the French failed to establish an administrative presence in the region. This diplomatic vacuum left Gyaman vulnerable to new threats, most notably from the expanding Mandé empire of Samori Touré. In 1895, Samori launched a devastating campaign against Gyaman, attacking and burning towns, capturing chiefs, and disrupting the kingdom's political structure. His occupation was short-lived; the French expelled Samori's forces in 1897 and incorporated the western territories of Gyaman into the colony of French West Africa. Meanwhile, the eastern portions of Gyaman, including Sampa, were drawn into the British administrative system, eventually becoming part of the Gold Coast Protectorate.

=== Colonial Partition and Reorganization ===
After the French expelled Samori Touré in 1897, Gyaman was divided between French and British colonial rule. The western territories, including Bondoukou, were incorporated into French West Africa as part of Côte d’Ivoire. The eastern section, centered on Sampa, was absorbed into the British Gold Coast Protectorate and administered under the Ashanti Resident. Colonial rule weakened Gyaman’s political system. After the British exiled the Asantehene in 1896, the Brong territories, including Gyaman, remained outside the restored Asante Confederacy. In the 1930s, British policy shifted toward administrative centralization, and Gyaman was reincorporated into the Asante Confederacy Council in 1935. Local chiefs from Techiman, Dormaa, and Sampa opposed renewed subordination to Kumasi. Despite this resistance, Gyaman formally joined the Confederacy in May 1935 under colonial supervision. These disputes later contributed to the Brong separatist movement after the Second World War. French rule brought major political and economic changes. Warfare ended, and the acquisition of captives stopped. The slave trade was gradually suppressed. Although some captives remained with their former masters, chiefs could no longer replace their labor force, which weakened their economic position.

In 1898, the French administration limited fines and judicial payments, and by 1901 these practices were abolished. This removed an important source of income for the king and chiefs. French officials noted that chiefs could no longer maintain their courts or dependants and were forced to abandon many of their former functions. New colonial taxes were introduced, including a head tax in 1901 and licensing fees on internal trade. Forced labor began in 1898 for public works and expanded after 1904 with the construction of the Abidjan–Niger railway. These measures replaced earlier systems of taxation and labor. Some chiefs resisted these policies and were punished. Others adapted by using their remaining authority to organize labor for activities such as rubber collection and plantation farming. Through this, some chiefs regained part of their influence under colonial rule.

=== Partition and the End of the Kingdom in Ghana and Côte d’Ivoire ===
In the wake of Ghana's independence in 1957, longstanding tensions between the Bono states and Kumasi resurfaced. Citing historical grievances and demanding administrative autonomy. These efforts culminated in the passage of the Brong-Ahafo Region Act (1959), which officially separated Brong territories from Ashanti and established them as a distinct region under Ghanaian law. As part of this restructuring, the Jaman District was created, centered on Sampa, reaffirming Gyaman's territorial identity within the new Brong-Ahafo Region. This move formalized the political aspirations of Brong chiefs and solidified a modern “Jaman” identity rooted in Gyaman's historical legacy. On the Ivorian side, Bonduku evolved into a regional center within Côte d'Ivoire's Zanzan District, but without the restoration of Gyaman's centralized authority. The ruling Bono line was retained symbolically in chieftaincy structures, but real power shifted to colonial and later republican institutions.

== Divisions ==
Gyaman was divided into five provinces. The most important of these was the royal domain called Ahen fie (the "house" of the king), which was ruled directly by the king and contained about 40–50 percent of the population.

== Government ==
The Kingdom of Gyaman was organized as a confederation of provinces under the authority of the Gyamanhene. The king held sacred and political authority within the royal domain, but power across the kingdom was decentralized. Each province was governed by a hereditary chief who exercised authority over political, judicial, religious, and economic matters within his territory, including the right to convene courts and settle disputes. Decisions made by provincial courts could be appealed to the king but were rarely overturned. Matters of foreign relations, including war and alliances, were decided collectively by a council composed of the king and the chiefs, which limited royal authority and gave Gyaman a confederal political structure.

=== Political roles ===
In the royal capital, daily administration was carried out by lesser dignitaries under the authority of the king and the chiefs. A distinction was made between officeholders and the safohene (captains). Among the officeholders were three adontenhene, who commanded the advance guard of the army in wartime, the okyeame (spokesman), the gyasehene, who supervised the king’s household servants, and the brafohene, who was responsible for the executioners. Other officials were in charge of drummers, tambourine players, and stool carriers. These offices belonged to particular lineages, often patrilineal, and were normally passed down within them. In principle, the king did not intervene in the selection of officeholders. The safohene were appointed by the king and placed under his authority. They supervised groups of villages as a reward for military service or other duties, presided over lower courts, and mobilized men from the villages under their control. This position was hereditary and usually passed down through the male line. In the provinces, political organization was simpler and centered on the kyeame, a small number of court officials, and the safohene.

At the lowest level of the political hierarchy were village and neighborhood chiefs. This was the only level at which groups such as the Kulango, Nafana, and Anyi exercised direct political authority. During the first decade of its existence, Gyaman extended control over several neighboring areas, but supervision of these territories was delegated to provincial chiefs. Three Anyi chiefdoms, Bona, Nsiah, and Bini, were placed under the sienghene, while Barabo fell under the penangohene. Only Asikasso remained directly under the authority of the ruler, although these subordinate territories retained a high degree of internal autonomy. The Dyula were treated as outsiders and were excluded from political office because they could not perform the ritual duties required of officeholders. While they could influence decisions, their status as privileged guests allowed the Abron ruling class to benefit from trade without allowing the emergence of an independent merchant group that could challenge political authority.

== Society ==
=== Demographics ===
By the late nineteenth century, Gyaman was described by European observers as a densely populated and ethnically diverse polity. Estimates from the 1880s placed its population at about 80,000 inhabitants, while colonial censuses carried out between 1901 and 1904 in the French-administered areas recorded 11,500 people. The population of Gyaman brought together groups of different linguistic and cultural backgrounds. Gur-speaking communities included the Nafana, Lobi, Deg, and the Kulango, who were widely spread and formed a large part of the rural population. Mandé-speaking groups consisted of the Goro and Gbin, the Ligbi, and the Numu blacksmiths, as well as Dyula traders and Muslim scholars, who were concentrated in towns such as Bondoukou. Akan-speaking populations were mainly the Abron ruling group and the Anyi in the south, many tracing their origins to early migrations from Akwamu. Traditional Akan religious institutions remained important in royal rites, festivals, and control over land, while Islamic learning and Dyula influence were more prominent in western Gyaman. The coexistence of sacred kingship and Islamic scholarship reflected Gyaman’s position as both a political center and a commercial crossroads along the forest–savannah frontier.

=== Religion ===
Religion played an important role in Gyaman. Some rites were performed every year, while others took place only in times of war, famine, or epidemic. At the Yam Festival, cattle and sheep were sacrificed to the spirit Tano. The spirit Tano and his priests were also consulted before major decisions or enterprises. When these undertakings were successful, the priests received gifts. Muslim religious specialists were also present in Gyaman. Dyula marabouts from Bondoukou, Barabo, and Kong provided prayers, divination, and protective amulets. Soldiers wore these amulets and believed they offered protection against bullets and wounds. In return, marabouts received gifts, including gold dust and captives. On the eve of Samori’s invasion, the Gyamanhene Kwaku Agyeman sent gun barrels filled with gold dust to Watara of Yerobodi to prepare for war, although the gold was reportedly taken by the messengers. Religious gifts were not fixed, the king decided their value based on the service provided or the danger involved. The obligations could be heavy and led to the transfer of large amounts of wealth from the Abron population to religious specialists.

== Economy ==
Like other Akan polities, Gyaman depended on the economic activities of its population to support the state. Long-distance trade was largely controlled by the Dyula, who occupied a separate position within Gyaman society. According to Terray, their wealth made them comparable to wealthy traders elsewhere on the coast but the comparison was limited. The king’s revenue was used to maintain the court, including food, salt, alcohol, cloth, and supplies for dependents and servants. Other resources were used for redistribution, especially during festivals such as the Yam Festival, when goods were consumed or distributed in public settings.

After the defeat of Gyaman in 1818, the state relied on several means to meet the demands imposed by Asante. Hostages were provided by Kulango communities, and the Asantehene Osei Bonsu appointed the Tuahene Kwasi Srewi to oversee part of the settlement. Even these measures proved insufficient. The Gyamanhene Kofi Fofie was forced to seek a loan from the ruler of Mango Dan Watara, and heavy ransoms were added to the indemnity. Queen Ama Tamin was taken captive to Kumasi and was released only after the payment of four hundred ounces of gold. In addition to the payments, Gyaman was subject to regular tribute to Asante from about 1740 until 1875. Sources give different figures for the amount demanded. Early in the nineteenth century, Gyaman paid an annual tribute that included gold dust and other valuables. By the late nineteenth century, the tribute had increased. During the reign of the Gyamanhene Kofi Sono, the annual payment was about one hundred kponta of gold dust. Under Kwaku Agyeman, the amount was raised to six hundred pefla, equivalent to six kponta, or about 52.8 grams each. The sums demanded were not fixed and changed with Asante financial needs. Tribute levels rose in the early nineteenth century and reached their highest point during the reign of the Asantehene Kwaku Dua I.

=== Gold production ===
Gyaman became widely known in the early nineteenth century for the importance of its gold mines. By about 1817–1820, information about its gold production had reached European observers such as Bowdich and Dupuis through Kumasi, and reports circulated as far as Fezzan. Gold was obtained in two main ways. Gold dust was collected from river sediments through washing, while shaft mining was used to extract gold from veins reached by deep pits. Ore was hauled to the surface in calabashes and then washed or crushed. Gold production was seasonal. Pits were flooded during the rains, while washing required abundant water, making the period immediately after the rains the most favorable. Dupuis reported that during a two-month period, between eight and ten thousand loads of gold were washed along the banks of the Ba River, which flows through southern Abron country before joining the Comoé. Captives carried out most of the gold-related labor. Underground mining was reserved for captives because of its physical difficulty and danger. They also performed much of the work involved in washing gold and transporting ore under the supervision of the king, chiefs, and notable households.

=== Financial administration ===
Gyaman did not develop a specialized financial administration. The population was relatively sparse, and direct taxes and dues formed only a limited part of state income. The kingdom levied no customs duties or tolls. Under these conditions, there was no separate branch of government devoted to the collection and management of public funds. Financial matters were handled within the existing political and administrative hierarchy rather than through a distinct treasury system. Two offices were closely connected to financial matters. The Gyasehene acted as steward of the royal household, while the Sampahene served as treasurer. The office of Sampahene was established in the second half of the eighteenth century and was passed down through the male line. The Sampahene controlled the gold that entered and left the royal treasury, using the official weighing box that belonged to the ruler. In his absence, no one, including the king, could access the treasury. The Sampahene also played a role in major ceremonies, including those associated with the Yam Festival. Apart from these offices, routine financial tasks such as the collection of fines, the pursuit of debtors, and oversight of court servants were carried out by the Safohene and the king’s attendants. Embezzlement was treated as a serious crime and was punishable by death. The king and provincial chiefs held separate treasuries, which sometimes caused disputes when common resources were involved.

=== Craft production ===
Alongside mining, Gyaman supported a wide range of craft activities. Woodworking, basket-making, and spinning were practiced in most rural communities. More specialized crafts included ironworking in Numu villages, pottery made by Deg women in the Motiamo area, and dyeing carried out by Hausa settlers in Bondoukou from the early nineteenth century. Weaving was practiced by the Abron and especially by Dyula specialists. Abron weavers usually worked in their home villages, while Dyula weavers often moved with their looms or settled in Bondoukou. Gold supplied by the king was used to produce regalia and ceremonial objects such as parasol ornaments, canes with gold heads, sandals, jewelry, and other insignia, which were displayed during festivals and diplomatic occasions. A large share of royal income was devoted to the enrichment of the stool. Objects acquired during a ruler’s reign were added to the royal treasury and passed on to successors. Kings invested in luxury goods obtained through trade and in the work of skilled local artisans, including weavers, goldsmiths, and sculptors. Some of these objects later entered European collections.

=== Agricultural production ===
Agriculture formed the main basis of the economy. Yam was the principal crop, with maize cultivated in the north and plantain in the south. The region also produced tobacco, palm oil, and crops such as cotton and indigo, though these were not major export commodities. In the savannah zones, the rearing of sheep, goats, and cattle expanded until losses caused by the epidemic of 1892 and the invasion of Samori in 1895 disrupted production, from which the area did not fully recover. Much of the agricultural labor that sustained the Abron aristocracy before the colonial period was carried out by captives. Chiefs and their relatives did not normally engage in manual work and relied on the cultivation of fields by captives for their subsistence. Captives attached to agricultural hamlets also supplied food for the inhabitants of Bondoukou and for passing caravans.

=== State revenue and exchange ===
The Abron state drew revenue from tribute, judicial authority, warfare, and long-distance exchange. The king and provincial chiefs had the right to demand labor and dues in kind from the populations they governed. Tribute included agricultural labor, animal products, ivory, skins, and festival offerings. All gold nuggets found within a ruler’s domain were surrendered to the king or the relevant provincial chief, who also controlled access to prospecting. These obligations were limited in scale, reflecting the dependence of the state on the military support of Abron and Kulango peasants. Judicial authority also generated income. Serious cases were judged by the king or provincial chiefs, and penalties were paid in gold. Executions were followed by confiscation of goods, and fines were added to compensation owed to injured parties. Court fees, customs, and obligatory gifts to judges formed part of this system. Judicial power also allowed the king and chiefs to acquire captives through debt, fines, or repeated offenses.

Revenue from warfare and foreign relations followed separate rules. Captives taken in war were divided between the king, chiefs, and warriors according to status. Ransoms and indemnities were sometimes accepted at the conclusion of conflicts, and foreign rulers offered gold to secure alliance or military support. These gains were added to the patrimony of the stool rather than treated as private profit. Long-distance trade was not taxed. Dyula caravans paid no tolls, and their commercial profits were exempt from duties. Attempts by the Abron to control trade routes failed, as caravans could bypass Abron towns. The Abron relied on Dyula traders to move surplus goods, including gold, livestock, cloth, salt, and captives. In return, Dyula communities enjoyed extensive privileges, including freedom from taxation and judicial immunity.

During the eighteenth and early nineteenth centuries, tribute paid by Gyaman to Asante varied in frequency and weight. In earlier periods, Asante collectors visited Gyaman only once every four or five years. Over the course of the nineteenth century, tribute became more regular and was usually collected every year after the Yam Festival. This shift was most pronounced during the reign of the Asantehene Kwaku Dua I. Between about 1750 and 1850, tribute changed from a relatively light obligation that mainly signified Gyaman’s subordination to Asante into a much heavier burden with clear economic importance. The method of collection remained unchanged. Envoys of the Asantehene, known as nhenkwa, presented the tribute demand to the Gyamanhene. The king assembled the provincial chiefs, and together they paid the required amount from their treasuries. The cost was later distributed among Abron and Kulango villages. The gold collected was sent to Kumasi through the Bantamahene, who oversaw Gyaman affairs within the Asante government. Informants reported that Asante collectors sometimes demanded extra payments for themselves in addition to the official tribute, including children. The abuses led to the issue of a mandate in Kumasi in 1817 to control the conduct of collectors, which Bowdich witnessed.

=== Judicial revenue ===
Judicial authority provided an important source of income for the king and chiefs. Fines, confiscations, and court payments were collected in gold. Village chiefs judged minor disputes, but serious cases, including homicide and adultery involving the wife of an important official, were judged directly by the king or provincial chiefs. Criminal cases involving witchcraft, treason, or offenses against royal authority were punished by death, and executions were followed by confiscation of property. If the condemned person had children, at least one child could be taken by the king or chief who delivered the verdict. Other offenses were punished by fines, which were added to compensation owed to injured parties and paid into the royal treasury. When litigants invoked the royal oath, cases were transferred to the king’s court, and fines increased. The payment of court fees, customs, and gifts to judges was obligatory and made in gold. Winning parties were also required to present gifts to judicial authorities, with amounts varying according to the importance of the case and the rank of those involved. Judicial power also enabled the accumulation of captives. Individuals who repeatedly disturbed public order or accumulated debt could be handed over to the king or a chief by their relatives, who sought relief from continued financial responsibility. These captives could be sold or retained in service. The exercise of judicial authority shaped the distribution of wealth within Abron society and limited the rise of independent wealthy individuals. Accumulation of wealth outside the aristocracy occurred only through incorporation into the political hierarchy, often through financial or military service to the king and chiefs.

== Legacy ==
In Ghana, the legacy of Gyaman is preserved among the Jaman people, particularly in Sampa, where chieftaincy institutions retain continuity with the former kingdom. The modern Jaman North and Jaman South Districts take their name from Gyaman and reflect the survival of its lineage structures within Ghana’s administrative system. In Côte d’Ivoire, Bondoukou remains the main center associated with the former Gyaman state. The town continues to serve as a cultural center for the Abron ruling group, descendants of Gyaman’s political elite. Although political authority was reduced under French rule, traditional leadership in Bondoukou has continued in a ceremonial form and remains important to regional identity in northeastern Côte d’Ivoire. Another one of Gyaman’s lasting cultural contributions is the association with Adinkra symbols, which are linked in oral tradition to the reign of Kwadwo Adinkra. The symbols were later adopted and expanded by Asante and spread widely across Akan-speaking regions. Today, Adinkra symbols remain in use in Ghana, Côte d’Ivoire, and beyond as visual expressions of ideas and values that developed in the context of the Gyaman court.

== See also ==
- Akwamu Empire
- Bonoman
- Bono people
- Adinkra symbols
- Asante Empire
- Bondoukou
- Brong-Ahafo Region
- Bono people
- Akan people
- Akan chieftaincy
- Gold Coast (British colony)
- French West Africa
- List of rulers of the Akan state of Gyaaman

== Sources ==
- Agyemang, Joseph Kwadwo; Ofosu-Mensah, Ababio Emmanuel; Gyamerah, Ebenezer Yaw (June 2013). "The Impact of Colonial Rule on the Gyaman State". History Research. 3 (6): 389–405.
- Anquandah, James (2013). "The People of Ghana: Their Origins and Cultures". Transactions of the Historical Society of Ghana (15): 1–25. ISSN 0855-3246. JSTOR 43855009.
- Arhin, Kwame (1979). A Profile of Brong Kyempim: Essays on the Archaeology, History, Language and Politics of the Brong Peoples of Ghana. Legon: Institute of African Studies, University of Ghana.
  - Posnansky, Merrick. "Archaeological Aspects of the Brong-Ahafo Region". In Arhin (1979).
- Arhin, Kwame (1980). "The Economic and Social Significance of Rubber Production and Exchange on the Gold and Ivory Coasts, 1880–1900". Cahiers d'Études Africaines. 20 (77/78): 49–62. doi:10.3406/cea.1980.2350. JSTOR 4391679.
- Britwum, K. A. (1974). "Kwadwo Adinkra of Gyaaman: A Study of the Relations Between the Brong Kingdom of Gyaaman and Asante from c.1800–1818". Transactions of the Historical Society of Ghana. 15 (2): 229–239. JSTOR 41406571.
- Diamond, Stanley (2011). Toward a Marxist Anthropology: Problems and Perspectives. De Gruyter. ISBN 9783110807714.
- Konadu, Kwasi; Campbell, Clifford C. (2016). The Ghana Reader: History, Culture, Politics. Duke University Press. doi:10.2307/j.ctv125jqp2. ISBN 9780822359845.
- Konadu, Kwasi (2010). The Akan Diaspora in the Americas. Oxford: Oxford University Press. doi:10.1093/acprof:oso/9780195390643.001.0001. ISBN 9780195390643.
- Kouame, René Allou (1992). "L'hégémonie Asante sur l'Abron Gyaman. 1740–1875. Plus d'un siècle de domination et de résistance". Africa: Rivista trimestrale di studi e documentazione dell'Istituto italiano per l'Africa e l'Oriente. 47 (2): 173–183. JSTOR 40760678.
- Muhammad, Akbar (1977). "The Samorian Occupation of Bondoukou: An Indigenous View". The International Journal of African Historical Studies. 10 (2): 242–258. doi:10.2307/217348. JSTOR 217348.
- Saffu, E. O. (1970). "The Ghana–Ivory Coast Boundary". Journal of the Historical Society of Nigeria. 5 (2): 291–301. JSTOR 41856847.
- Stahl, Ann Brower (2001). Making History in Banda: Anthropological Visions of Africa's Past. New Studies in Archaeology. Cambridge: Cambridge University Press. ISBN 9781139428866.
- Terray, Emmanuel (1980). "The Political Economy of the Abron Kingdom of Gyaman". Research Review. 12 (1). Institute of African Studies, University of Ghana: 1–36. ISSN 0855-4412.
- Terray, Emmanuel (1982). "L'économie politique du royaume abron du Gyaman" [Political Economy of the Brong Kingdom of Gyaman]. Cahiers d'Études Africaines. 22 (87/88): 251–275. doi:10.3406/cea.1982.3378. JSTOR 4391810.
