= Sunyani West District =

Sunyani West District District Ouest de Sunyani
- District
- Districts of Bono Region

- Location of Sunyani West District within Bono Region
- Coordinates: 7°22′N 2°19′W
- Country: Ghana
- Region: Bono Region
- Capital: Odumase

Government
  - District Executive: Hon. Martin Obeng
  - Member of Parliament: Hon. Ignatius Baffour Awuah
  - District Coordinating Director: Mr. Philip D. Baazeng

Population (2021)
  - Total: 136,022
- Time zone: UTC+0 (GMT)

Sunyani West District is one of the twelve districts in Bono Region, Ghana. Originally it was formerly part of the then-larger Sunyani District on 10 March 1989; until the northwest part of the district was split off to create Sunyani West District on 1 November 2007 (effectively 29 February 2008); thus the remaining part has been retained as Sunyani District (which it was later upgraded to municipal district assembly status and has been renamed as Sunyani Municipal District on that same year). The district assembly is located in the western part of Bono Region and has Odumase as its capital town.

== Tertiary institution ==
Sunyani West is notable in Bono Region for hosting the first University of the region. The Catholic University of Ghana, Fiapre attracts students from all the country which transforms Fiapre in the past ten years. Fiapre is now mainly occupied by the elite group because of the students in both Catholic University College and University of Energy and Natural Resources. Even though the University of Energy and Natural Resources is not officially declared to be in Sunyani West, by the geographic location it is part of the district with the main campus planned to be situated at Nsoatre also in the Sunyani West.

== Senior High Schools ==
Sunyani West has four public Senior High Schools which serves students within the Bono Region and beyond. The renowned Notre Dame Girls is one of the preferred choice for girls in Ghana.

- Odomaseman Senior High School
- SDA Senior High School
- Notre Dame Girls Senior High School
- Sacred Heart Senior High School

== List of settlements ==
Settlements of Sunyani West District
| No. | Settlement | Population | Population year |
| 1 | Abesu | | |
| 2 | Abronye | | |
| 3 | Adantia | | |
| 4 | Adei Boreso | | |
| 5 | Ahyiam | | |
| 6 | Ayakomaso | | |
| 7 | Chiraa | | |
| 8 | Chiraa-Asuakwa | | |
| 9 | Dumasua | | |
| 10 | Fiapre | | |
| 11 | Kantro | | |
| 12 | Kobedi | | |
| 13 | Kwabenakuma krom | | |
| 14 | Kwatire | | |
| 15 | Mantukwa | | |
| 16 | Nsesereso | | |
| 17 | Nsoatre | | |
| 18 | Odumase | | |
| 19 | Twumasi krom | | |

== Sources ==
- "Sunyani West District". Statoids.
- District: Sunyani West District
