= Fiapre =

- town
- Location within Ghana
- Coordinates: 7°22′00″N 2°21′00″W
- Country: Ghana
- Region: Bono Region
- District: Sunyani West Municipal
- Elevation: 932 ft (284 m)
- Time zone: GMT
  - Summer (DST): GMT

Fiapre is a town in Sunyani West Municipality in the Bono Region of Ghana. Fiapre is very close to the regional capital town of the Bono Region, Sunyani and shares borders with Sunyani, Odomase, Dumasua, Mantukwa and Nsuatre, all within the Sunyani West Municipality in the Bono Region of Ghana.

== Early history to current status of Fiapre ==
History has it that the people of Fiapre migrated first from Jukwaa in Denkyira land after the famous Feyiase war during which the Ashantis led by Nana Osei Tutu defeated the Denkyira army led by Nana Ntim Gyakari. In fact, they sought refuge at Bantama in Kumasi.

During the period, many people took refuge at Bantama, which became a safe haven during Ashanti's war of expansion. Bantama became over-populated, and the people of Fiapre, led by their leader Nana Kyem Amponsah and Obaa Panin Yaa Pomaah, sought permission from their host to move further north. They were granted permission and went to stay temporarily at Techiman Baamire. They took along their black stool. The chief and elders of Techiman Baamire did not want to share their land with Nana Kyem Amponsah and Obaa Panin Yaa Pomaah, so they sacked them virtually. fiapre has a population of 136,022 people.

From Techiman Baamire, the people moved to Chiraa near Sunyani, where they were received well by the people. Close by, Nana Antepim had established a village called Odomase. He was both a farmer and a hunter. Nana Antepim visited Chiraa one day and saw the beautiful Obaa Panin Yaa Pomaah and fell in love with her. He was able to convince the people to move to Odomase.

At Odomase, the new immigrants and their hosts co-existed peacefully because it was established that most of the people of Odomase also migrated from Denkyira.

However, Nana Antepim wanted Nana Kyem Amponsah to have his freedom to reign over his people, taking into account the black stool, so he showed him a piece of land that was a virgin forest on the west for them to settle and develop their own settlement. Nana Kyem Amponsah thanked the Chief of Odomase, Nana Antepim, and moved to their new home with his entourage to settle there. This is the area on and around the hill facing the current Bono Regional Minister's Residence on the right-hand of the Berekum-Sunyani main road beyond the SDA Hospital in Fiapre.

When they settled over there, they found the land, especially on the hill, as being rocky and could not support the erection of huts for accommodation. So they called the place "Asi-apiri" literally meaning that whenever one dug, the tool "hit a rock". The place is still called Asi-apiri.

They, therefore, decided to move a little way to the north and settled at a place called Tweneboase, named after a type of tree called Tweneboa. They felt better at the place but had a problem with access to potable water.

Meanwhile, there was still a very cordial relationship between the people of the new settlement and the people of Odomase. When they moved from Asi-apiri, they reported to their counterparts at Odomase, "We have moved from Apiri", which in Twi was stated as "Y'afiri apiri". With repetition, the new settlement became known as Firi-apiri, which has now been corrupted to Fiapre.

However, one Attah found a stream towards the east and a little closer to Odomase, which was very accessible. The people called the stream Atta-dea, meaning "It belongs to Attah". The stream is still very active, but the name has been corrupted to Atta-der.

The stream attracted the people to move towards it. They built their huts close by and found the land very fertile. The royal family of Fiapre is known as "Brofrease" because tradition has it that when they reported on the state of their newly found land, they said it was as soft "as under a pawpaw tree". Paw-paw is the English word for brofre in the Twi Language.

The town is referred to as Fiapre Republic as it is an independent town that is not under any Paramount Chief. On 9th October 2017, a new Chief of Fiapre (Fiaprehene) was enstooled under the stool name Obrempong Professor Kyem-Amponsah II, known in private life as Professor Emmanuel Ohene Afoakwa (formerly Head of the Department of Nutrition and Food Science of the University of Ghana, Legon, and formerly, the President of the erstwhile Ghana Technology University College (GTUC), and then in March 1, 2021, became the First Vice-Chancellor of the Ghana Communication Technology University (GCTU) in Tesano, Accra).

With 20 sub-chiefs and 16 queen mothers under the new Fiaprehene, his kingdom operates under the name Fiapre Traditional Authority. He has also enstooled his sub-chiefs and queenmothers at various communities under Fiapre, including Kantro (Kantro No. 1, 2 & 3) and Asiapreso (Berlin Top). Under his leadership, Fiapre has become the hub of education in the Bono region, and his reign has led to the continuous expansion of the Fiapre community into a small cosmopolitan community.

== Education and Health Care ==
The Fiapre township has several private and public schools, including primary, junior, and senior high schools. It hosts the Holy Spirit School, a Catholic School aimed at holistic education. The school has been one of the few to receive the prestigious presidential award more than twice, which shows its prestige in dominating education all over Ghana.

Further to these, Fiapre has one of the best female senior high schools in Ghana, known as Notre Dame Senior High School.

In the year 2022, under the initiative of the Chief of Fiapre, Obrempong Professor Kyem Amponsah II, a new Senior High School known as Kyem Amponsah Senior High School, named after the Chief of Fiapre was constructed in Fiapre with the support of Hon. Ignatius Baffour-Awuah (Former Member of Parliament for Sunyani West Constituency). Through the benevolence and support from the Chief of Fiapre, the first batch of students was admitted into the school in January 2024 for the people of Fiapre.

In addition to the high number of primary, junior and senior high schools in the town, Fiapre has two prominent tertiary institutions - namely the Catholic University of Ghana (privately owned by the Catholic Church of Ghana) and the State-owned University of Energy and Natural Resources (UENR), both situated at Fiapre.

Health Care Centres: The Fiapre community has three main healthcare centres that provide healthcare for the inhabitants within the Fiapre township and its nearby communities. These include the SDA Hospital, Fiapre that is situated on entrance of the Fiapre township and directly opposite the Bono Regional Ministers Residency and the University of Energy and Natural Resources (UENR); the Fiapre Health Centre situated with the Fiapre West Community and the Fiapre CHPS Compound, situated within the Oyoko and Zongo areas of the town. These healthcare centres provide immense support towards healthcare delivery and medical services to the people of Fiapre and its nearby communities.

== Economy ==
Agriculture is the main occupation for the people in the town, while teaching, civil service and private businesses also play a very big role. Three financial institutions namely; GN Bank, Calvary Methodist Savings and Loans, Capital Rural Bank and Drobo Community Bank Limited have their branches at Fiapre.
