= Drobo =

Company and brand of external storage devices

Drobo, Inc.
- Type: Private
- Industry: Computer hardware Computer data storage
- Founded: San Jose, California, US (May 2005)
- Founder: Geoff Barrall; Julian Terry; Ken Rosen
- Defunct: April 28, 2023
- Headquarters: San Jose, California, US
- Area served: Worldwide
- Key people: Mihir H. Shah, CEO; Mike Edwards, CFO; Rod Harrison, CTO
- Products: Drobo

Drobo was a manufacturer of a series of external storage devices for computers, including DAS, SAN, and NAS appliances. Their main product was also known as Drobo. Between 2005 and 2011, the company was known as Data Robotics.

== History ==
Data Robotics was founded in San Jose, California, in 2005. The company changed its name to Drobo in 2011 since the familiarity with the Drobo name (which had only been the name of their product line until then) far exceeded the Data Robotics name. Drobo, Inc. merged with Connected Data, Inc. in June 2013, with the new company taking the Connected Data name. In May 2015, the storage appliance business was spun-off as Drobo, Inc. and acquired by an investment group composed of seasoned tech executives. Drobo was later acquired by StorCentric in August, 2018.

All Drobo products had been out of stock or severely inventory constrained in both the Drobo Store and retail channels since the beginning of 2020. Drobo initially blamed this on supply chain issues caused by the COVID-19 pandemic. In November, 2021, Drobo stated that more devices would be available in "the next few months". In June 2022, StorCentric filed for Chapter 11 bankruptcy. After failing to find a buyer or reorganize the company, it shifted to Chapter 7 bankruptcy in April 2023.

From the Drobo website: As of January 27th, 2023, Drobo support and products are no longer available. Drobo support has transitioned to a self-service model. The knowledge base, documentation repository, and legacy documentation library are still accessible for your support needs. We thank you for being a Drobo customer and entrusting us with your data.

As of February 8, 2024, the Drobo website at www.drobo.com is no longer accessible.

== Products ==
=== Overview ===
Drobo devices can house up to four, five, eight, or twelve 3.5" or 2.5" Serial ATA or Serial Attached SCSI hard disk drives and connect with a computer or network via USB 2.0, USB 3.0, FireWire 800, eSATA, Gigabit Ethernet or Thunderbolt. Drobo devices are primarily designed to allow installation and removal of hard disk drives without requiring manual data migration, for increasing storage capacity of the unit without downtime, and for data protection against drive failure.

==== Consumer models ====
	Drobo (1st)	Drobo (2nd)	Drobo (3rd)	Drobo 5C	Drobo S	Drobo S (2nd)	Drobo 5D	Drobo 5Dt	Drobo 5D3	Drobo 8D	Drobo FS	Drobo 5N	Drobo 5N2	Drobo Mini
Model Number	DR04DD10	DR04DD14	DDR3A21	DDR4A21	DRDR3A21	DRDR4A21	DRDR5A21	DRDR5A21-T	DRDR6A21	DRDR7A21	DRDS2A21	DRDS4A21	DRDS5A21	DR-Mini-1P11
Release date	5 June 2007	8 July 2008	28 May 2014	4 October 2016	23 November 2009	16 November 2010	2 November 2012	21 June 2016	27 June 2017	13 November 2018	6 April 2010	13 December 2012	21 March 2017	26 October 2012
Type	DAS	DAS	DAS	DAS	DAS	DAS	DAS	DAS	DAS	DAS	NAS	NAS	NAS	DAS
Drive Bays	4	4	4	5	5	5	5+1*	5+1**	5+1*	8+1***	5	5+1*	5+1*	4+1*
Redundancy	Single drive	Single drive	Single or dual drive	Single or dual drive	Single or dual drive	Single or dual drive	Single or dual drive	Single or dual drive	Single or dual drive	Single or dual drive	Single or dual drive	Single or dual drive	Single or dual drive	Single or dual drive
Hosts	Single	Single	Single	Single	Single	Single	Single	Single	Single	Single	Up to 10 users			Single
Data-Aware Tiering	No	No	No	No	No	No	Yes	Yes	Yes	Yes	No	Yes	Yes	Yes
USB	2.0	2.0	3.0	3.0 (Type C)	2.0	3.0	3.0	3.0	3.0 (Type C)	No	No	No	No	3.0
FireWire 800	No	Yes	No	No	Yes	Yes	No	No	No	No	No	No	No	No
Gigabit Ethernet	No	No	No	No	No	No	No	No	No	No	1x (AFP and CIFS/SMB)	1x (AFP and CIFS/SMB)	2x (independent, bonded, or failover links)	No
eSATA	No	No	No	No	Yes	Yes	No	No	No	No	No	No	No	No
Thunderbolt	No	No	No	No	No	No	1.0	2.0	3.0	3.0	No	No	No	1.0
Max Storage	4TB	16TB	64TB	64TB	16TB		64TB	64TB	64TB	128TB	16TB	64TB	64TB	64TB
Max Volume Size	2TB	16TB	64TB	64TB	16TB		64TB	64TB	64TB	256TB	16TB	64TB	64TB	64TB
Largest size drive		4TB	12TB	14TB	4TB		14TB	14TB	14TB	14TB	4TB	14TB	18TB	12TB

* Plus one mSATA SSD slot for Data-Aware Tiering
**Plus one 128 GB mSATA SSD card for Data-Aware Tiering
***Plus one 2.5" SATA SSD bay for Data-Aware Tiering

==== Business models ====
	DroboPro	DroboPro FS	B800fs	B810n	DroboElite	B800i	B810i	B1200i
Model Number	DRPR1A21	DRDS3A21	DR-B800FS-4A21	DR-B810N-5A21	DREL1A21	DR-B800I-2A21	DR-B810I-3A21	DRB1200I1A21
Release date	7 April 2009	5 October 2010	8 February 2011	25 October 2015	23 November 2009	8 February 2011	23 February 2016	8 February 2011
End of Support	14 December 2014	30 May 2012	19 September 2016	N/A	30 May 2012	19 September 2016	N/A	7 August 2019
Type	DAS	NAS	NAS	NAS	SAN	SAN	SAN	SAN
Drive Bays	8	8	8	8	8	8	8	12
Redundancy	Single or dual drive	Single or dual drive	Single or dual drive	Single or dual drive	Single or dual drive	Single or dual drive	Single or dual drive	Single or dual drive
Hosts	Single	Up to 25 users	Up to 100 users	Up to 100 users	Up to 16	Up to 8		Up to 24
Data-Aware Tiering	No	No	No	Yes	No	No	Yes	Yes
USB	2.0	No	No	No	2.0, Admin only	2.0, Admin only	No	No
FireWire 800	Yes	No	No	No	No	No	No	No
Gigabit Ethernet	1x (iSCSI)	2x (AFP and CIFS/SMB)	2x (AFP and CIFS/SMB)	2x (AFP and CIFS/SMB)	2x (iSCSI)	2x (iSCSI)	2x (iSCSI) and 1x (Management)	3x (iSCSI) and 1x (Management)
Max Storage	32TB	32TB	32TB	64TB	32TB	32TB	64TB	128TB
Max Volume Size	16TB	16TB	16TB	64TB	16TB	16TB	64TB	64TB
Largest Size Drive	4TB	4TB	4TB	14TB	4TB	4TB	14TB	8TB (SATA) 6TB (SAS)
