= Odumase, Ghana =

Odumase Odumase Sunyani West
- Town and District Capital
- Location of Odumase in Bono Region
- Coordinates: 7°22′N 2°19′W
- Country: Ghana
- Region: Bono Region
- District: Sunyani West District
- Elevation: 981 ft (299 m)

Population
  - Total: 16,542
  - Ethnicity: Akan people
- Demonym: Odumaser
- Time zone: GMT
  - Summer (DST): GMT

Odumase (or Odumase Sunyani West) is a small town and is the capital of Sunyani West district of the Bono Region of Ghana. The number of inhabitants is 16,542.

Odumase is known for the Odomaseman Day Secondary School. The school is a second cycle institution.
