= Jinijini =

Town in Bono Region, Ghana

Coordinates: 7°26′N 2°39′W

- Interactive map of Jinijini
- Country: Ghana
- Region: Bono Region

Jinijini is a town in the Bono Region of Ghana. 'Gyenegyene' is the Akan (Ghanaian language) word for Jinijini which means pure, clear, still (of water). It is the capital town for Berekum West district which was inaugurated on 15 March 2018. It is about 7 km, 39 km and 412 km away from Berekum, Sunyani and Accra respectively. Jinijini is also known for the Jinijini Senior High School (Jinss); a second cycle institution which started around mid 1990. The school celebrated its 20th anniversary in 2011. Jinijini has two FM radio stations namely First 94.7 FM and Adikanfo 99.1 FM serving the people with music, sports, politics, social and religious talks.
