= Jaman =

Jaman, LLC
- Website type: video on demand
- Available in: English
- Headquarters: San Francisco, California, U.S.
- Key people: Gaurav Dhillon, CEO
- Website: www.jaman.com
- Registration: Optional
- Current status: active

Jaman was a company that offered users a movie discovery site, allowing them to browse viewing options offered across the internet.

In its previous iteration, Jaman was one of the first sites to offer views on demand of media on the internet. It allowed viewing on a variety of platforms via a downloadable P2P client, specializing in foreign and independent films.

The company was founded by Gaurav Dhillon, who was the Chief Executive Officer of Informatica (NASDAQ: INFA), a Silicon Valley company that he co-founded in 1992.

== History ==
In its first iteration, Jaman offered movies in both download rental and free ad-supported streaming formats. Jaman's library included independent, international and studio films through deals with major film distributors including:

- Lionsgate Films (Dogville, Girl With A Pearl Earring)
- Paramount Digital Entertainment (Into the Wild, The Kite Runner)
- Arts Alliance America (Super Size Me)
- BBC Worldwide America (documentaries including Dowry Law)
- Eros International (Bollywood films such as Sholay, Chalte Chalte, Devdas and Eklavya)
- Atopia (A Silent Love)
- First Look Studios (Mayor of Sunset Strip)
- Magnolia Pictures (ENRON: Smartest Guys in the Room)
- Independent productions (Inside Iraq, Amu)

Currently, Jaman has expanded its mood finder technology to allow users to explore and browse movies offered across the internet on a variety of platforms, such as Netflix, Hulu, and Amazon Prime Video.

== Sources ==
- Wall Street Journal: “Indie Films Hit the Web”
- Falcone, John P. (October 22, 2008). "TiVo adds content from Disney/CinemaNow and Jaman". CNET. Archived from the original on August 5, 2009.
- New York Times: “The Shape of Cinema, Transformed at the Click of a Mouse”
- Variety: “Jaman firms up indie pacts”
- The Economist: “Hollywood and the internet: Coming soon”
