= Jaman North District =

District in Bono Region, Ghana

- District
- Districts of Bono Region

- Location of Jaman District within Bono Region
- Coordinates: 7°57′N 2°42′W
- Country: Ghana
- Region: Bono Region
- Capital: Sampa

Government
  - District Executive: Adane Ankomah

Population (2021)
  - Total: 117,909
- Time zone: UTC+0 (GMT)

Jaman North District is one of the twelve districts in Bono Region, Ghana. Originally it was formerly part of the then-larger Jaman District on 10 March 1989, which was created from the former Berekum-Jaman District Council, until part of the district was split off to create Jaman North District on 12 November 2003 (effectively 17 February 2004); thus the remaining part has been renamed as Jaman South District; which it was elevated to municipal district assembly status on 1 November 2017 (effectively 15 March 2018) to become Jaman South Municipal District. The district assembly is located in the western part of Bono Region and has Sampa as its capital town.

== Geography ==
It is located between latitude 7O 40’ N and 8O 27’N, and longitude 2O 30’W and 2O 60’W. The district is located in the western part of the Bono Region and to the north western fringes of the neighboring Ivory Coast country. It borders Tain District to the north through to the eastern part of the district, Jaman South Municipal District to the southwest and Berekum Municipal District to the southeast. The location of the district along the Ghana and Ivory Coast border presents economic potential and opportunities that can be maximized to improve the lives of the citizenry.

== Population ==
According to the 2010 population and housing census, the total population of the district is 83,059 with a population growth rate of 2.25% as that of the region and is composed of 48.1% males and 51.9% females with about 52.5% of the population living in urban areas and 47.5% living in the rural areas.

== Economy ==
The employment rate in the district is about 78% of the active labour force. The above figure puts the unemployment rate in the district at 22%. However, the unemployment rate in the region is about 34% which is higher than the district's rate of 22%. The major economic activities of the district fall under agriculture, forestry and commerce which employ about 72% of the active labour force in the district. Service and industrial sectors employ about 8.1% and 19.9% of the labour force, respectively.

== Agriculture ==
Agriculture is the dominant economic activity in the municipality. It employs more than 70% of the total population within the labour force. Thus it is the major source of livelihood for majority of people in the district. The major sectors of agriculture in the district are crop farming and livestock rearing.

== Education ==
The district has seventy-five schools: fifty-six public and nineteen private, with 99 classrooms. Total KG enrolment is 5,917 with 4,695 enrolled in the public schools. The male and female figures are; 2,244 and 2,451 respectively. Total enrolment at the primary level is 14,006 comprising 7,159 males and 6,901 females. At the Senior High level, there are eight Senior High and Technical Schools.

== Health ==
Both orthodox and traditional health services are provided in the municipality which focuses on curative and preventive care delivery. The health needs of the population are catered for by the Sampa Government Hospital, Fountain Care Hospital, the six sub-districts health centres and over thirty-three chemical shops.

== List of major settlements ==
Settlements of Jaman North District
Settlement	Population	Population year
Duadaso		
Goka		
Kokoa		
Sampa		
Suma-Ahenkro		
Bonakire		
Kabile		
Old Drobo		
Seketia		
Nsonsonmea		

== Sources ==
- "Jaman North District". Statoids.
- District: Jaman North District
- 19 New Districts Created , November 20, 2003.
