= Jaman South Municipal District =

Municipal assembly in Bono Region, Ghana

- District
- Districts of Bono Region

- Location of Jaman South Municipal District within Bono Region
- Coordinates: 7°35′13″N 2°47′17″W
- Country: Ghana
- Capital: Drobo

Population (2021)
  - Total: 108,388
- Time zone: UTC+0 (GMT)

Jaman South Municipal is one of the 12 municipal assemblies and districts in Bono Region, Ghana. Originally known as Jaman District on March 10, 1989, after being created from the former Berekum-Jaman District within the then-larger Brong-Ahafo Region. Later on, part of the district was split off to create Jaman North District on November 12, 2003; thus the remaining original part became Jaman South District. It was later upgraded to municipal status in November 2017, and renamed as Jaman South Municipal. The municipality is located in the western part of Bono Region and has Drobo as its capital town.

It shares common borders with Berekum West District to the south-east, Jaman North District to the North, Dormaa Municipal to the south and La Côte d'Ivoire in the west. The Municipal has a total land area of about 700 km^{2} (270 sq mi) and about 130 settlements most of which are rural communities and have a population less than 400. It has a total land area of 1,500 km^{2} (580 sq mi).

== List of settlements ==
Settlements of Jaman South District
| Settlement | Population | Population year |
| Adadiem | | |
| Adamasu-Adams | | |
| Adinkrakrom | | |
| Amanfoso | | |
| Asantekrom | | |
| Asuokor | | |
| Asiri | | |
| Atuna | | |
| Babianihaa | | |
| Basakrom | | |
| Bonakire | | |
| Buni | | |
| Mayera | | |
| Faago | | |
| Dodosuo | | |
| Dwenem | | |
| Faaman | | |
| Febi | | |
| Goka | | |
| Grobete | | |
| Gyinanko | | |
| Jamera | | |
| Jankufa | | |
| Japekrom | | |
| Jinini Kokoa | | |
| Kaabre | | |
| Kabile | | |
| Kokosua | | |
| Korase | | |
| Kwasibourkrom | | |
| Morle | | |
| Mpuasu | | |
| Gonasua | | |
| Nsonsomea | | |
| Nwamsua | | |
| Ponko | | |
| Sambusi | | |
| Seketia | | |
| Suma Ahenkro | | |
| Yawtwenekrom | | |
| Zobo | | |
