= Berekum =

City in Bono Region, Ghana

- City
- Nickname: The Golden City
- Location of Berekum in Bono
- Coordinates: 7°27′N 2°35′W
- Country: Ghana
- Region: Bono
- District: Berekum East Municipal

Government
  - Omanhene: Daasebre Dr. Amankona Diawuo II, Unfortunately died in 2023
- Elevation: 327 m (1,073 ft)

Population (2013)
  - Total: 62,364
- Time zone: GMT
  - Summer (DST): GMT
- postal code: BB
- Area code: 035 22
- Climate: Aw
- Website: bema.gov.gh

Berekum, nicknamed "The Golden City", is a city and the capital of Berekum East Municipal in the Bono Region of Ghana. The city has a population of 62,364 as of 2012. The native language of the Berekum people is the Bono Twi. As of 2020, the Omanhene of the city is Daasebre Dr. Amankona Diawuo II.

== History ==
Based on oral tradition, there were three Akan people groups who originally migrated and settled in the area (now known as Berekum). The first branch to arrive, known as the Awasu people, are said to be migrants from Denkyira (now residing in Biadan). The second branch also originated from Denkyira, now residing in Abi (4 km (2.5 mi) from Berekum).

The last branch were Gyaman soldiers from Asokore. After the Gyamans were defeated by the Asante army, some of the soldiers escaped west to Côte d'Ivoire. This resulted in a post being set up in Berekum by the Asantes to be ensure that no resurgence will occur. It is believed that these migrations were led by the leaders of Bɔfoakwa, Bɔfoɔbɛm, and Sefa Antwireboa.

== Demographics ==
About 34% of the population is rural while 66% is urban. Nearly 90% of the population is Christian of which 38.8% is Pentecostal, 23.5% is Protestant, 17% is Catholic, and 8.8% practices other kinds of the religion. This is following by Islam (6.5%), traditional religions (0.4%), and those who are not affiliated with any religion (4.1%).

== Economy ==
Over 70% of the population, mostly rural, is engaged in agriculture. Plantains, maize, cassavas, yams, and cocoyams have been cultivated in the area since the 18th century. Other sectors in the economy include commerce, services and industry.

== Culture ==
The town is located in the Berekum Traditional Area (Note: In Ghana, the term 'traditional area' is used to describe an area in which all of its community members shared the same culture, and are under the same Omanhene (Paramount Chief)) in which the paramount chief or the Omanhene is Daasebre Dr. Amankona Diawuo II.

== Geography ==
Berekum is located in the Berekum East Municipal district which borders to the north-east Tain District, Dormaa East District to the south and to the south-east is the Sunyani West District. The town is situated about 32 km (20 mi) from Sunyani and 437 km (272 mi) from Accra.

=== Climate ===
Berekum has a tropical savanna climate (Köppen climate classification Aw), with a wet season and a dry season and the temperature being hot year-round. The mean annual rainfall ranges from 1,275 to 1,544 mm (50.2 to 60.8 in).

Climate data for Berekum
Month	Jan	Feb	Mar	Apr	May	Jun	Jul	Aug	Sep	Oct	Nov	Dec	Year
Mean daily maximum °C (°F)	35.0 (95.0)	41.0 (105.8)	38.0 (100.4)	39.0 (102.2)	32.5 (90.5)	31.5 (88.7)	40.0 (104.0)	31.9 (89.4)	29.9 (85.8)	46.0 (114.8)	34.4 (93.9)	34.0 (93.2)	46.0 (114.8)
Mean daily minimum °C (°F)	17.8 (64.0)	18.1 (64.6)	16.8 (62.2)	16.8 (62.2)	14.5 (58.1)	13.8 (56.8)	15.9 (60.6)	15.3 (59.5)	14.8 (58.6)	16.3 (61.3)	16.3 (61.3)	15.6 (60.1)	14.5 (58.1)
Average precipitation mm (inches)	7.6 (0.3)	10 (0.4)	13 (0.5)	48 (1.9)	89 (3.5)	76 (3.0)	30 (1.2)	33 (1.3)	61 (2.4)	79 (3.1)	30 (1.2)	7.6 (0.3)	490 (19.1)
Source: Meoweather.com

== Human resources ==
=== Education ===
The biggest educational institution in the town is the Berekum College of Education. Established in 1953 by then chief Nana Yiadom Owusu II, the college was officially accredited to offer diplomas in 2007.

=== Health ===
The town's major hospital is the Berekum Holy Family hospital (HOFAHO), which is a catholic diocesan hospital that serves as the municipal hospital. It was established in 1948 by the Medical Mission Sisters and became a Diocesan hospital in 1978.

=== Sports ===
The town is home to two stadiums: the Berekum Sports Stadium and the Golden City Park. Professional sports teams based in Berekum are Berekum Chelsea and Berekum Arsenal.

== Notable people ==
- Kwadwo Afari-Gyan (born 1945), former chairman of the Electoral Commission of Ghana
- Emmanuel Agyemang-Badu (born 1990), professional footballer
- Samuel Amofa (born 1999), professional footballer
- Kwesi Appiah (born 1990), professional footballer
- George Benneh (1934-2021), geographer, academic and university administrator
- Kofi Adoma Nwanwani (born n/a), journalist
- John Paintsil (born 1981), professional footballer
- Isaac Sackey (born 1994), professional footballer

== See also ==
- paramount chief
