= Bono Region =

Region of Ghana

- Region
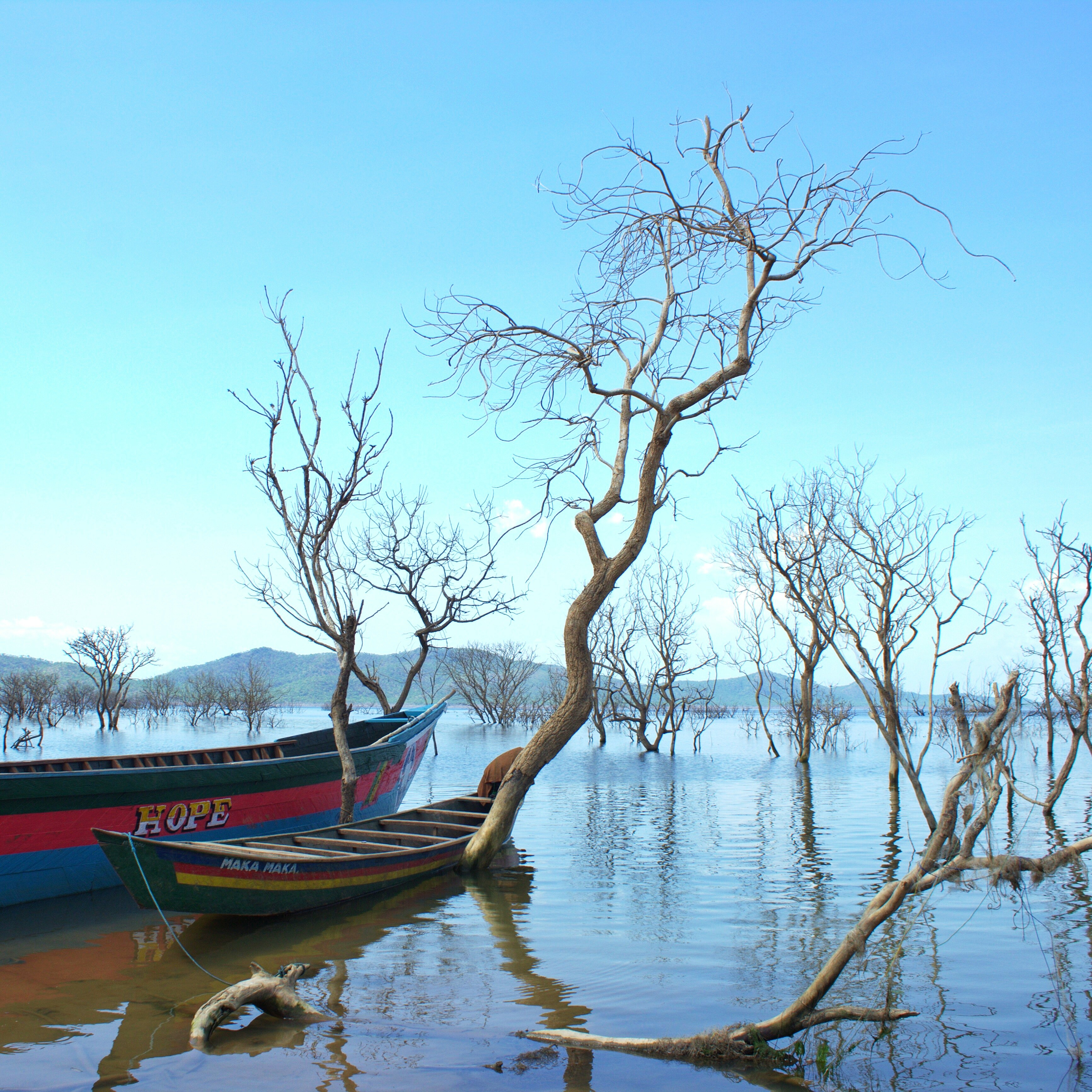
- Bui Bayou near the border with Savannah Region

- Location of Bono in Ghana
- Country: Ghana
- Established: 27 December 2018
- Capital: Sunyani
- Districts: 12

Government
  - Regional Minister: Joseph Addae Akwaboah

Area
  - Total: 11,113 km^{2} (4,291 sq mi)

Population (2021)Census
  - Total: 1,208,649
  - Density: 108.76/km^{2} (281.69/sq mi)

GDP (PPP)

GDP (Nominal)
- Time zone: GMT

The Bono region is one of the 16 administrative regions of Ghana. It is as a result of the remainder of Brong-Ahafo region when Bono East region and Ahafo region were created. Sunyani, also known as the green city of Ghana, is the regional capital. Sunyani can pride itself as the cleanest capital city and a major conference destination.

== Creation of the region ==
The region was created after the Ahafo region and Bono East region respectively have been carved out of the then Brong-Ahafo region. This was in fulfillment of a promise made by candidate Nana Akuffo Addo in his 2016 campaign activities. The implementation of plans for the creation of this region is seeded to the newly created Ministry of Regional Reorganization and Development under the leadership of Hon. Dan Botwe. Brong Ahafo Region in effect ceased to exist and so does the Brong Ahafo Region Co-ordinating Council (BARCC).

Consequently, in the spirit of Article 255 of the 1992 constitution and Article 186 of the Local Governance Act, 2016 (Act 936 as Amended), the Bono Regional Co-ordinating Council (BRCC) is a new entity and thus replaces the BARCC. Because of this, it became necessary to inaugurate the BRCC to enable it to perform its functions accordingly.

== Administrative divisions ==
The political administration of the region is through the local government system. Under this administration system, the region is divided into 12 MMDA's (made up of 0 Metropolitan, 5 Municipal and 7 Ordinary Assemblies). Each District, Municipal or Metropolitan Assembly, is administered by a Chief Executive, representing the central government but deriving authority from an Assembly headed by a presiding member elected from among the members themselves. The current list is as follows:

Map of Bono Region Districts

Districts of the Bono Region
#	MMDA Name	Capital	MMDA Type	Member of Parliament	Party
1	Banda	Banda Ahenkro	Ordinary	Ahmed Ibrahim	NDC
2	Berekum East	Berekum	Municipal	Nelson Kyeremeh	NPP
3	Berekum West	Jinijini	Ordinary	Kwaku Agyenim-Boateng	NPP
4	Dormaa Central	Dormaa-Ahenkro	Municipal	Kwaku Agyeman-Manu	NPP
5	Dormaa East	Wamfie	Ordinary	Paul Apreku Twum Barimah	NPP
6	Dormaa West	Nkrankwanta	Ordinary	Vincent Oppong Asamoah	NDC
7	Jaman North	Sampa	Ordinary	Frederick Yaw Ahenkwah	NDC
8	Jaman South	New Drobo	Municipal	Williams Okofo-Dateh	NDC
9	Sunyani	Sunyani	Municipal	Kwasi Ameyaw Cheremeh	NPP
10	Sunyani West	Odumase	Ordinary	Ignatius Baffour Awuah	NPP
11	Tain	Nsawkaw	Ordinary	Adama Sulemana	NDC
12	Wenchi	Wenchi	Municipal	Haruna Seidu	NDC

== Vegetation and climate ==
This area's topography is mainly characterized by a low elevation not exceeding 152 metres above sea level. It has moist semi-deciduous forest and the soil is very fertile. The region produces Cash crops like cashew, timber, etc., and food crops such as maize, cassava, plantain, cocoyam, tomatoes, and many others.

== Location and size ==
Bono Region shares a border at the north with the Savannah Region, is bordered on the west by Ghana-Côte d'Ivoire international border, on the east by Bono East, and on the south by Ahafo Region.

It has a population of about 1,208,649 according to Ghana statistical service in 2021 census.

== Tourism and parks ==
- Bui National Park, which is 1,821-kilometer square and covers part of the Black Volta River, is endowed with several species of antelopes and a variety of birds. It is also known for its hippopotamus population. The tourist can take a cruise on the Black Volta River through the National Park.
- Bui Dam, located at the base of the Banda Mountains, was built to improve Ghana's energy requirements.
- Duasidan Monkey Sanctuary, located 10 km southwest of Dormaa Ahenkro, hosts a rare breed of Mona Monkeys. The tourist is welcomed by the presence of these monkeys as you enter their forest-like abode. Bamboo trees form a canopy in the middle of the forest, which serves as a resting ground for visitors. Monkeys can be seen swinging up and down tree branches and peeling bananas left out for them. The visitor gets a chance to see how monkeys carry their babies on the move.

== Education ==
The region prides itself on having public institutions such as:

- University of Energy and Natural Resources,
- Sunyani Technical University,
- Dormaa Senior High School,
- Sunyani Senior High school,
- St. Vitus,
- Notre Dame Girls Senior High School,
- Sacred Heart Senior High School,
- Twene Amanfo Senior High Technical School,
- Odumanseman Senior High School,
- Bonoman Senior High School,
- Abesim Senior High School
- Catholic University in Fiapre,
- Ideal College,
- Saint James Senior High Seminary in Abesim,
- Miracle Preparatory Junior & High School,
- Sunyani Business High School etc.

== Religions ==
- Bono Ancestral Worship and spirituality and Christianity is the dominant religion within this domain.

== Cultural and social life ==
There are several cultural practices and festivals within this region. Some are:

- Kwafie is celebrated by the Dormaa, Berekum and Nsoatre people in November, December or January.
- Munufie by Drobo. They are celebrated to cleanse and feed the stools and gods respectively. It is climaxed with a large bonfire in the palace courtyard. It is believed that the people of Dormaa Ahenkro (Aduana) brought fire to Ghana, hence this legend is symbolically re-enacted.
- Akwantukese is celebrated by the people of Suma in March.
- Akyiriwia Festival is celebrated by the people of Atomfourso near Seikwa in the Tain District.
