= 2020–2021 Aduana Stars F.C season =

Aduana Stars F.C
- Chairman: Albert Commey
- Manager: Paa Kwesi Fabin
- Stadium: Agyeman Badu Stadium; Dormaa Ahenkro, Bono Region
- Premier League: 4th
- FA Cup: Knockout round 16
- All statistics correct as of 11 August 2021.

The 2021–21 season of Ghanaian club Aduana Stars F.C. The season covered the period from 20 November 2020 to 8 August 2021.

== Season overview ==
Aduana Stars ended the 2020-21 season without a trophy after placing fourth in the domestic the league and was knocked out by Ashanti Gold S.C. in the FA Cup

== Technical team ==
The technical team

Position	Name
Head coach	(Ghana) Paa Kwesi Fabian

== Squad ==
As of 1 January 2021

Note: Flags indicate national team as defined under FIFA eligibility rules; some limited exceptions apply. Players may hold more than one non-FIFA nationality.

No.	Pos.	Nation	Player
1	GK	(Ghana) GHA	Massawudu Inusah
2	FW	(Ghana) GHA	Fatawu Abdulrahman
3	FW	(Ghana) GHA	Isaac Kwain
4	DF	(Ghana) GHA	Hafiz Adams
6	DF	(Ghana) GHA	Paul Aidoo
7	MF	(Ghana) GHA	Sam Adams
8	MF	(Ghana) GHA	Prince Acquah
9	FW	(Ghana) GHA	Adam Musah
10	FW	(Ghana) GHA	Bright Adjei
11	FW	(Ghana) GHA	Yahaya Mohammed
12	GK	(Ghana) GHA	Flavien Kouassi Kongoza Jean
13	DF	(Ghana) GHA	Caleb Amankwah
14	FW	(Ghana) GHA	Richard Kwesi Nathan
15	MF	(Republic of the Congo) CGO	Oba Ikama Ulitch
16	GK	(Ghana) GHA	Joseph Addo
17	FW	(Ghana) GHA	Pius Asante Yeboah

No.	Pos.	Nation	Player
18	DF	(Ghana) GHA	Norbert Supe
19	DF	(Ghana) GHA	Musah Amevor
20	DF	(Ghana) GHA	Emmanuel Akuoko
21	MF	(Ghana) GHA	Brabby Kofigo
22	GK	(Ghana) GHA	Richard Mantey
23	MF	(Ghana) GHA	Samuel Bioh
24	DF	(Ghana) GHA	Adams Farouk
25	DF	(Ghana) GHA	Justice Anane
26	MF	(Ghana) GHA	Emmanuel Osei Baffour
27	MF	(Ghana) GHA	Charles Kamara Gyamfi
28	MF	(Ghana) GHA	John Nyamekye
29	DF	(Ghana) GHA	Joshua Tijani
30	MF	(Ghana) GHA	Noah Martey
33	MF	(Ghana) GHA	Ebenezer Aboagye

== Competitions ==
=== Premier League ===
==== League table ====
Pos	Team	Pld	W	D	L	GF	GA	GD	Pts
2	Asante Kotoko	34	15	12	7	37	22	+15	57
3	WAFA	34	16	8	10	46	38	+8	56
4	Aduana Stars	34	16	7	11	44	42	+2	55
5	Medeama	34	15	9	10	38	34	+4	54
6	Great Olympics	34	15	7	12	37	33	+4	52

Updated to match(es) played on 18 July 2021. Source: type=Goal.com
