= Dormaa West (Ghana parliament constituency) =

Constituency in the Bono Region of Ghana

- constituency for the Parliament of Ghana
- Region: Bono Region of Ghana

Current constituency
- Party: National Democratic Congress (Ghana)
- MP: Vincent Oppong Asamoah

Dormaa West is a constituency for the Parliament of Ghana in the Bono Region of Ghana. During the Second and Third Republics, there was a single Dormaa constituency.

During the Fourth Republic, there was a Dorma East and Dorma West constituency set up before the 1992 Ghanaian parliamentary election. Before the 2012 Ghanaian general election, there was a reconfiguration so that there was now a Dormaa East, Central and West constituency. The Dorma West MP at the time, Kwaku Agyemang-Manu who was elected after the 2008 Ghanaian general election went on to stand and win the seat for Dorma Central.

Vincent Oppong Asamoah is the current member of parliament for the constituency. He is the longest serving MP for Dormaa West. He won the seat in 2012. He lost the seat in 2016 but won the seat back in 2020 and retained it in 2024.

== Members of Parliament ==
First elected	Member	Party	Term
Second Republic Dormaa
1969	Solomon Anso Manson	Progress Party	1969-1972
Third Republic
1979	Solomon Anso Manson	Popular Front Party	1979-1981
Fourth Republic Dorma West created
1992	Thomas Kwame Yeboah	National Democratic Congress	1993-2001
2000	Yaw Asiedu-Mensah	New Patriotic Party	2001-2009
2008	Kwaku Agyemang-Manu	New Patriotic Party	2009-2013
2012	Vincent Oppong Asamoah	National Democratic Congress	2013-2017
2016	Ali Maiga Halidu	National Democratic Congress	2017-2021
2020	Vincent Oppong Asamoah	National Democratic Congress	2021 to date

== Election results ==
2024 Ghanaian general election: Dormaa West
Party	Candidate	Votes	%	±%
NDC	Vincent Oppong Asamoah	11,299	55.04	+1.28
NPP	Ali Maiga Halidu	9,101	44.33	−1.91
Independent	Umar Yusif	130	0.63	—
Majority		2,198	10.71	+3.19
Turnout		20,792	69.71	—
Registered electors		29,827		—

2020 Ghanaian general election: Dormaa West
Party	Candidate	Votes	%	±%
NDC	Vincent Oppong Asamoah	11,480	53.76	+4.64
NPP	Ali Maiga Halidu	9,874	46.24	−4.64
Majority		1,606	7.52	+5.76
Turnout		—	—	—
Registered electors		—		—

2016 Ghanaian general election: Dormaa West
Party	Candidate	Votes	%	±%
NPP	Ali Maiga Halidu	8,422	50.88	+7.36
NDC	Vincent Oppong Asamoah	8,131	49.12	−6.52
Majority		291	1.76	−10.36
Turnout		16,725	71.30	−12.28
Registered electors		23,456		—

2012 Ghanaian general election: Dormaa West
Party	Candidate	Votes	%	±%
NDC	Vincent Oppong Asamoah	8,683	55.64	+7.32
NPP	Ali Maiga Halidu	6,792	43.52	−6.8
NDP	Anthony Gyabaah	81	5.38	—
CPP	Isaac Sarpong	51	0.33	+0.02
Majority		1,891	12.12	+10.12
Turnout		16,228	83.58	+13.84
Registered electors		19,417		—

2008 Ghanaian general election: Dormaa West
Party	Candidate	Votes	%	±%
NPP	Kwaku Agyemang-Manu	23,991	50.32	+0.2
NDC	Vincent Oppong Asamoah	23,038	48.32	+0.65
People's National Convention	Christiopher A. A. Bangme	238	0.50	—
DFP	Yeboah Kyeremeh Lawrence	203	0.43	—
CPP	Isaac Anabah	149	0.31	—
DPP	Kwae Solomon	60	0.13	−2.08
Majority		953	2.00	−0.45
Turnout		48,408	69.74	−12.76
Registered electors		69,416		—

2004 Ghanaian general election: Dormaa West
Party	Candidate	Votes	%	±%
NPP	Yaw Asiedu-Mensah	23,764	50.12	+0.12
NDC	Vincent Oppong Asamoah	22,601	47.67	+4.35
DPP	Kwadwo Agyei-Dwomor	1,047	2.21	—
Majority		1,163	2.45	−4.23
Turnout		47,537	82.5	+19.34
Registered electors		56,289		—

2000 Ghanaian general election: Dormaa West
Party	Candidate	Votes	%	±%
NPP	Yaw Asiedu-Mensah	20,331	50.00	+11.03
NDC	Thomas Kwame Yeboah	17,618	43.32	−12.87
NDP	Solomon Anso Manson	1,088	2.68	—
National Reform Party	Chou-En-Lai Paul Ankomah	588	1.45	—
CPP	Kofi Adu-Gyamfi	460	1.13	—
People's National Convention	Christopher Bagme	369	0.91	−0.31
United Ghana Movement	Arhin Seth Asante	211	0.52	—
Majority		2,713	6.68	−10.54
Turnout		40,730	63.16	−13.07
Registered electors		64,483		—

1996 Ghanaian general election: Dormaa West
Party	Candidate	Votes	%	±%
NDC	Thomas Kwame Yeboah	24,019	56.19	—
NPP	Agnes Afriyie Amankwaa	16,656	38.97	—
Independent	Kwaku Appiah Menkah	1,544	3.61	—
People's National Convention	Worry Wulley Williams	522	1.22	—
Majority		7,363	17.22	—
Turnout		43,366	77.07	—
Registered electors		56,268		—

== See also ==
- List of Ghana Parliament constituencies
