= Emmanuel Akuoko =

Ghanaian footballer (born 1983)

Emmanuel Akuoko (born 10 January 1983) is a Ghanaian former professional footballer who played as a defender. He played for Ghanaian Premier League side Aduana Stars for majority of his career. He previously played for Kuwaiti side Burgan.

== Club career ==
=== Aduana Stars ===
Akuoko started his career with Dormaa-based club Aduana Stars in September 2007. He was part of the squad that won the Ghana Division One League and got promoted to the Ghana Premier League in August 2009, the first time in the club's history. He helped the club win their first Premier League title in their inaugural season during the 2009–10 season with Herbert Addo as head coach, setting numerous records in the process including setting a world record for least productive champions with 19 goals in 30 matches equalling it with an average of 0.6333 goals per match.

As at 2015, he had been serving as club captain of the club. He served as the captain and played a key role in helping them lift their second league title during the 2017 Ghana Premier League. From 2018, he has been serving as the general captain of the side, with Yahaya Mohammed, Joseph Addo and Paul Aidoo all serving as team captains at one point in time.

=== Burgan SC ===
On 5 August 2019, Akuoko joined Kuwaiti team Burgan. He joined defender former Aduana Stars teammate Bright Adjei who also signed for the club days ago.

=== Return to Aduana Stars ===
Akuoko's move to Burgas SC took a snag and he returned to his former club Aduana Stars in December 2019. In May 2020, at the age of 37 years, he mentioned in an interview that he was not ready to hang his boots rather he had 5–6 years more on his playing career and ruled out retirement from football after 2025.

== International career ==
Akuoko received call-ups to the Ghana A' national football team, the Local Black Stars team in 2011 and 2015.

== Style of play ==
Akuoko mainly plays as a central defender but has the ability to play across the back four and as a defensive midfielder.

== Personal life ==
In 2020, Akuoko revealed his dream of becoming a professional football agent after retiring from playing football. He put up a five a five bedroom house in Kumasi, the capital town of the Ashanti Region through the help of the club's bank roller Omanhene of Dormaa Osaagyefo Oseadeeyo Nana Agyeman Badu II.

== Honours ==
Aduana Stars

- Ghana Premier League: 2009–10, 2017
- Ghana Super Cup: 2018
