= Aduana (disambiguation) =

Aduana may refer to:

- Aduana, an Akan clan
- Aduana Building, a Spanish colonial structure in Manila, Philippines
- Aduana Stars, a professional football club, based in Dormaa Ahenkro, Brong-Ahafo, Ghana
