= Ibrahim Osman (footballer, born 1999) =

Ghanaian professional footballer

Ibrahim Osman (born 19 July 1999) is a Ghanaian professional footballer who plays as forward for Ghana Premier League side Asante Kotoko S.C. He previously played for Liberty Professionals and King Faisal Babes.

== Club career ==
=== Asokwa Deportivo ===
Osman played for Ghana Division One League club Asokwa Deportivo before moving to Asante Kotoko In February 2018, whilst still playing for Deportivo he featured in a friendly match against his future club Kotoko, in the process scoring a goal in a 2–1 loss to Deportivo. Two months after the friendly match he was signed by Asante Kotoko.

=== Asante Kotoko ===
In May 2018, Osman was signed by coach Paa Kwesi Fabin, in a bid to bring in young talented players into the Kotoko squad. He was later on sent on a 1-year loan deal to Dansoman-based side Liberty Professionals along with Michael Yeboah ahead of the 2019 Ghana Football Association Normalization Committee Special Competition.

=== King Faisal (loan) ===
In December 2019, Osman was sent on a season long loan deal to King Faisal Babes. He scored 8 goals and made 3 assists in 14 matches before the league was cancelled due to the COVID-19 pandemic.

=== Return to Asante Kotoko ===
In July 2020, after his season long loan deal ended with King Faisal, he returned to his parent club Asante Kotoko, even though King Faisal made attempts to secure him on a permanent basis. With no striker from Asante Kotoko scoring more than 3 goals the season before that he was in line of being one of their main strikers. There were reports that Aduana Stars wanted to sign him as a replacement for Yahaya Mohammed who was on the verge of leaving the club. In November 2020, he was named in the club's squad for the 2020–21 Ghana Premier League. On 11 December 2020, he scored his first league goal for Asante Kotoko by scoring the only goal in a 1–0 win Legon Cities Stars, to help to win their first match of the season, he scored the goal in the 10th minute from an assist by Patrick Kojo Asmah but later received an injury in the 40th minute of the same match and had to be stretchered off and replaced by Evans Adomako. He was ruled out for their next match against Accra Great Olympics. In March 2021, he returned to training after 4 months on the sidelines with the thigh injury.
