= Hafiz Adams =

Ghanaian footballer (born 1992)

Personal information
- Date of birth: 12 July 1992 (age 34)
- Place of birth: Ghana
- Position: Defender

Team information
- Current team: Real Tamale United
- Number: 31

Senior career*
Years	Team	Apps	(Gls)
2012–2017	Wa All Stars	71+	(1)
2018–2022	Aduana Stars	88	(2)
2022–	Real Tamale United	23	(0)
- * Club domestic league appearances and goals as of 20 August 2023

Hafiz Adams (born 12 July 1992) is a Ghanaian professional footballer who plays as a defender for Ghanaian Premier League side Real Tamale United. He previously played for and captained Wa All Stars to their first league title in 2016.

== Career ==
=== Wa All Stars ===
Adams started his career in his home town club Wa All Stars, now Legon Cities FC, graduating from the youth side to captain the club. He spent eight seasons with the club, from 2009 to 2017. During the 2016 season, he played 28 out of 30 league matches helping them to secure their first ever league title, making it the first time a team from Northern Ghana won a league title. He served as club captain during that season till he left in 2017. He went on and played 16 league matches in the 2017 season. In November 2017, after an impressive season, Adams was linked with a move to then League Champions Aduana Stars.

=== Aduana Stars ===
On 6 December 2017, Adams joined Dormaa-based side Aduana Stars ahead of the GHALCA Top 8 competition as the club also sort to bolster their squad before the start of the 2018 CAF Champions league. He signed a three-year deal with the club after successful negotiations and passing his mandatory medicals. He was expected to serve as the replacement for Aduana's long serving right-back Godfred Saka, who had moved to Nigerian club Enyimba FC. During 2018 Ghanaian Premier League season, he played 11 matches and scored a goal. In the 2019 GFA Normalization Committee Special Competition, he played 11 matches.

During the 2019–20 Ghana Premier League season, he played 5 matches before the league was brought to a halt as a result of the COVID-19 pandemic. With the league set to restart he made the squad list for the 2020–21 Ghana Premier League season. In December 2020, Adams signed a short-term one-year extension contract with the club, which was to keep him at the club till the end of the 2020–21 season. On 18 January 2021, he was adjudged the man of the match after an impressive display in helping his team to a 2–1 victory after goals from Yahaya Mohammed and Fatawu Abdulrahaman over his former club Legon Cities.

Real Tamale United FC

Hafiz joined Real Tamale United FC after his contract with Aduana Stars expired in July 2022 on a 2-year contract. The experienced defender signed contract extension in July 2024 which will see him play the 2024/2025 season with the "Pride of North" in the Access Bank Division One League for Zone 1A.

On August 22, 2025, Hafiz again signed a one-year contract extension with Real Tamale United FC.

== Personal life ==
Adams is a native of Wa. He is devout Muslim.

== Honours ==
Wa All Stars

- Ghana Premier League: 2016
- Ghana Super Cup: 2017

Aduana Stars

- Ghana Super Cup: 2018
