= List of Liga Primera seasons =

Seasons of top division of Nicaraguan football

The Primera División de Nicaragua is the top division of football in Nicaragua. This list shows the champions and movements in and out of the Primera División for each season since its foundation in 1933. Liga Primera livescore, results, standings and match details are available at Flashscore website.

== Seasons ==
Season	Champions	Relegated from the Primera División de Nicaragua	Promoted to the Primera División de Nicaragua
1933	Alas Managua	TBD	TBD
1934	Club Atletico Managua	TBD	TBD
1935-1938 (Not Played)	No Champion	None	None
1939	Lido	TBD	TBD
1940	Diriangén FC	TBD	TBD
1941	Diriangén FC	TBD	TBD
1942	Diriangén FC	TBD	TBD
1943	Diriangén FC	TBD	TBD
1944	Diriangén FC	TBD	TBD
1945	Diriangén FC	TBD	TBD
1946	Ferrocarril	TBD	TBD
1947	Colegio C-A	TBD	TBD
1948	Ferrocarril	TBD	TBD
1949	Diriangén FC	TBD	TBD
1950	Aduana	TBD	TBD
1951	Aduana	TBD	TBD
1952(Not Played)	No Champion	None	None
1953	Diriangén FC	TBD	TBD
1954	La Salle	TBD	TBD
1955	Aduana	TBD	TBD
1956	Diriangén FC	TBD	TBD
1957(Not Played)	No Champion	None	None
1958	Club Atletico Managua	TBD	TBD
1959	Diriangén FC	TBD	TBD
1960	La Nica	TBD	TBD
1961	Deportivo Santa Cecilia	TBD	TBD
1962-1964 (Not Played)	No Champion	None	None
1965	Deportivo Santa Cecilia	TBD	TBD
1966	Flor de Caña FC	TBD	TBD
1967	Flor de Caña FC	TBD	TBD
1968	Universidad Centroamericana (UCA)	TBD	TBD
1969	Diriangén FC	TBD	TBD
1970	Diriangén FC	TBD	TBD
1971	Deportivo Santa Cecilia	TBD	TBD
1972	Deportivo Santa Cecilia	TBD	TBD
1973	Deportivo Santa Cecilia	TBD	TBD
1974	Diriangén FC	TBD	TBD
1975	Universidad Centroamericana (UCA)	TBD	TBD
1976	Universidad Centroamericana (UCA)	TBD	TBD
1977	Universidad Centroamericana (UCA)	TBD	TBD
1978-1979 (Not Played)	No Champion	None	None
1980	Bufalos	TBD	TBD
1981	Diriangén FC	TBD	TBD
1982	Diriangén FC	TBD	TBD
1983	Diriangén FC	TBD	TBD
1984	Deportivo Masaya	TBD	TBD
1985	America Managua	TBD	TBD
1986	Deportivo Masaya	TBD	TBD
1987	Diriangén FC	TBD	TBD
1988	America Managua	Xilotepelt	TBD
1989	Diriangén FC	TBD	Xilotepelt
1990	America Managua	Xilotepelt	TBD
1991	Real Estelí F.C.	TBD	TBD
1992	Diriangén FC	TBD	TBD
1993	Juventus Managua	TBD	TBD
1994	Juventus Managua	TBD	TBD
1994-95	Diriangén FC	TBD	TBD
1995-96	Diriangén FC	TBD	TBD
1996-97	Diriangén FC	TBD	TBD
1997-98	Deportivo Walter Ferretti	Deportivo González (San Marcos)	TBD
1998–1999	Real Estelí F.C.	TBD	TBD
1999–2000	Diriangén FC	TBD	TBD
2000–2001	Deportivo Walter Ferretti	TBD	Real Madriz
2001–2002	Deportivo Jalapa	TBD	TBD
2002–2003	Real Estelí F.C.	TBD	TBD
2003 Apertura	Real Estelí F.C.	TBD	TBD
2004 Clausura	Real Estelí F.C.	TBD	TBD
2004 Apertura	Diriangén FC	TBD	TBD
2005 Clausura	Diriangén FC	TBD	TBD
2005–2006	Diriangén FC	TBD	TBD
2006–2007	Real Estelí F.C.	TBD	TBD
2007–2008	Real Estelí F.C.	TBD	TBD
2008–2009	Real Estelí F.C.	TBD	TBD
2009 Apertura	Deportivo Walter Ferretti	TBD	TBD
2010 Clausura	Real Estelí F.C.	Chinandega FC, VCP Chinandega	None
2010 Apertura	Deportivo Walter Ferretti	None	Managua F.C., América Managua
2011 Clausura	Real Estelí F.C.	Xilotepelt, America Managua	None
2011 Apertura	Real Estelí F.C.	None	Juventus Managua, Chinandega FC
2012 Clausura	Real Estelí F.C.	Real Madriz	None
