= Aristică Cioabă =

Romanian footballer and manager

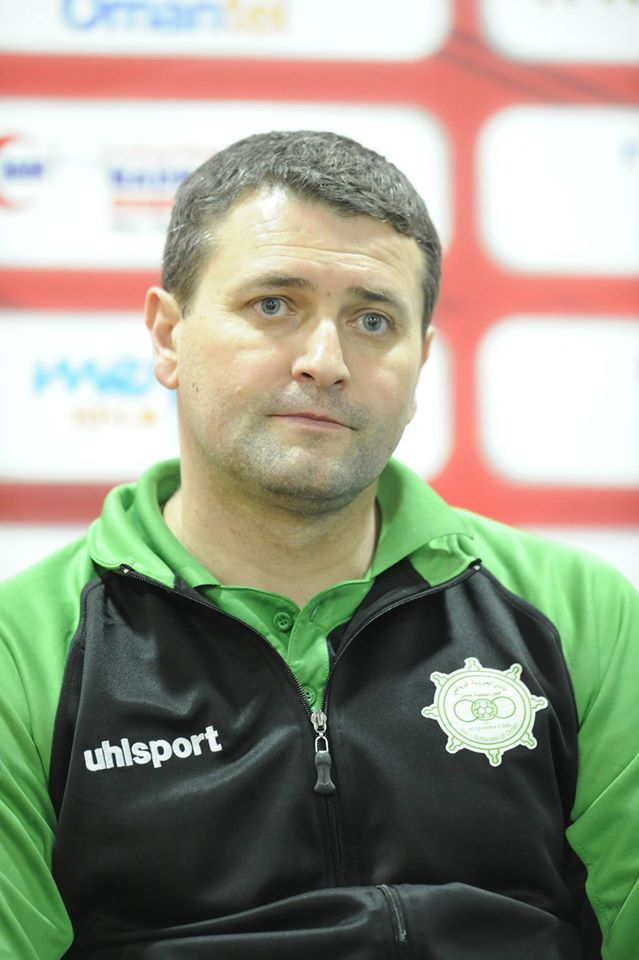
- Aristică Cioabă in a press conference in Oman

Personal information
- Full name: Aristică Cioabă
- Date of birth: 4 August 1971 (age 55)
- Place of birth: Petroșani, Romania
- Height: 1.88 m (6 ft 2 in)
- Position: Defensive midfielder

Team information
- Current team: Aduana FC

Senior career*
| Years | Team | Apps | (Gls) |
| 1989–1995 | Jiul Petroșani | | |
| 1995–1996 | Farul Constanța | | |
| 1996–1997 | Jiul Petroșani | | |
| 1997–1998 | Rocar București | | |
| 1997–1998 | → Universitatea Cluj (loan) | | |
| 1998–1999 | Foresta Fălticeni | | |
| 1999–2000 | Onești | | |
| 2000 | Yunnan Hongta | | |
| 2001 | Wuhan Hongjinlong | | |
| 2002–2003 | Bihor Oradea | | |
| 2003–2004 | Al-Shoalah | | |
| 2004–2005 | Esporles | | |

Managerial career
- 2005: Raja Casablanca (assistant)
- 2006: Al-Masry (assistant)
- 2007–2009: FC Balş
- 2009–2010: Al-Tadamun (assistant)
- 2010: Shabab Al-Ordon
- 2011–2012: Aduana Stars
- 2012–2013: Saham
- 2013–2014: Al-Oruba
- 2014–2015: Al-Shabab
- 2015–2016: Saham
- 2016: Aduana Stars
- 2017–2018: Azam
- 2018–2021: Sohar
- 2021–2024: Bangladesh Police
- 2024-: Aduana FC
- * Club domestic league appearances and goals

Aristică Cioabă (born 4 August 1971) is a Romanian football manager and a former footballer who is the current head coach of Ghanaian Premier League club Aduana Football Club.

== Playing career ==
Cioabă began his footballing career in with Petroșani-based CS Jiul Petroșani and played for seven consecutive seasons with them in both Romania's Divizia A and the second tier Divizia B. He made his debut for the Jiul side in the 1989–90 Divizia A season under head coach, Gogu Tonca.

In the 1995–96 Divizia A season, he moved to the oldest Romanian city, Constanța where he signed a one-year contract with FC Farul Constanta and made a few appearances in the 1995 UEFA Intertoto Cup though his side were eliminated by SC Heerenveen in the Round of 16.

The following season, he returned to CS Jiul Petroșani, where he helped his side to get promoted to the 1996–97 Divizia A. In Romania, he also played for lower league sides like AFC Rocar București, FC Universitatea Cluj, Foresta Fălticeni and FC Onesti before moving abroad to China where he played for two years with Yunnan Hongta F.C. and Wuhan Hongjinlong. He also had spells in Saudi Arabia with Al-Shoalah before finishing his career in Spain with CE Esporles.

== Managerial career ==
Cioabă holds the UEFA Pro License, the highest football coaching qualification since 2018 from the Romanian Football Federation. He also holds the UEFA A License since 2005.

=== Raja Casablanca ===
Cioabă began his managerial career in Morocco with Raja Casablanca where he worked as an assistant for Alexandru Moldovan in the first few rounds of the 2005–06 Botola. In his one-year stay as the assistant coach of the Casablanca-based club, he helped his side win the 2005 Coupe du Trône. He also helped them reach the Semi-finals stage of the 2005 CAF Champions League.

=== Al-Masry ===
He then moved to Egypt in 2006 and again worked as an assistant to Alexandru Moldovan for Egyptian Premier League side, Al-Masry SC.

=== FC Balş ===
In 2007, he returned to Romania where he was appointed as the manager of the Romanian Liga III side FC Balş where he worked till 2009.

=== Al-Tadamun ===
His next move out of Romania was to Kuwait in 2009 where he again worked as an assistant to Costică Ștefănescu and Alexandru Moldovan for Al-Farwaniya-based, Al-Tadamun SC of Kuwaiti Premier League.

=== Shabab Al-Ordon ===
After spending a season in Kuwait, he moved to another West Asian country, Jordan in 2010 where he was appointed as the manager of top Jordanian club, Shabab Al-Ordon Club. In his very short stint with the Amman-based club, he led his side to the Semi-finals stage of the 2011–12 Jordan FA Cup where his side lost 4–2 on aggregate to Al-Faisaly SC.

=== Aduana Stars ===
After spending more than a year in Asia, he moved to the African continent and more accurately to Ghana where he was appointed as the head coach of Ghana Premier League club, Aduana Stars in August 2011 replacing Herbert Addo. He made appearances as the head coach of the Dormaa Ahenkro-based club in the 2011 CAF Champions League where his side lost 3–1 on aggregate to Morocco's Wydad Casablanca.

=== Saham ===
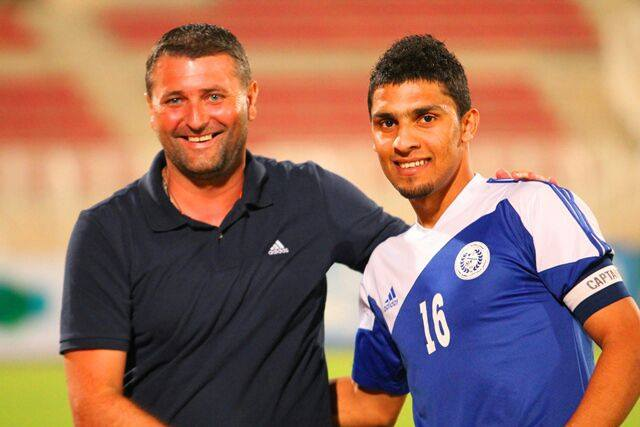
Aristică Cioabă and Yaqoob Al-Qasmi – 2012–13 Oman Elite League

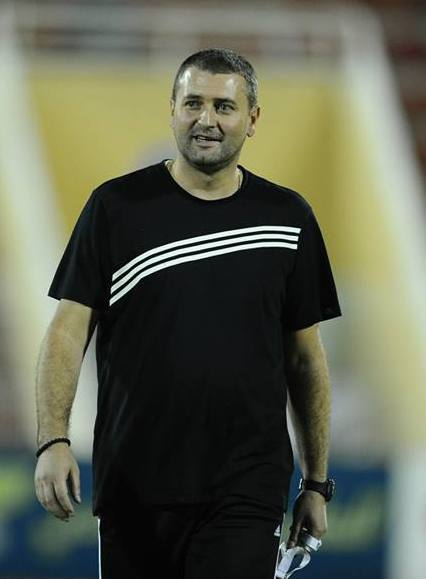
Aristică Cioabă – 2012–13 Oman Elite League

In 2012, he again made a move out to the Middle East and more accurately to Oman where he was appointed as the manager of Saham SC. He helped the Saham-based club to win the 2011–12 Oman First Division League and thus helping in promotion to the 2012–13 Oman Elite League. He also helped them achieve the runners-up position in the 2012–13 Oman Federation Cup. Soon after the Second Round of the 2013–14 Oman Professional League, Saham SC's management decided to part company with the Petroșani-born coach.

=== Al-Orouba ===
While he was at the Saham-based club, news speculated that he would take charge of Ghana's Medeama SC. Soon after he signed a two-and-a-half-year contract with the Ghanaian side worth $110 000. However, this agreement failed to materialize and as a result he signed for another Omani club Al-Orouba SC.

=== Al-Shabab ===
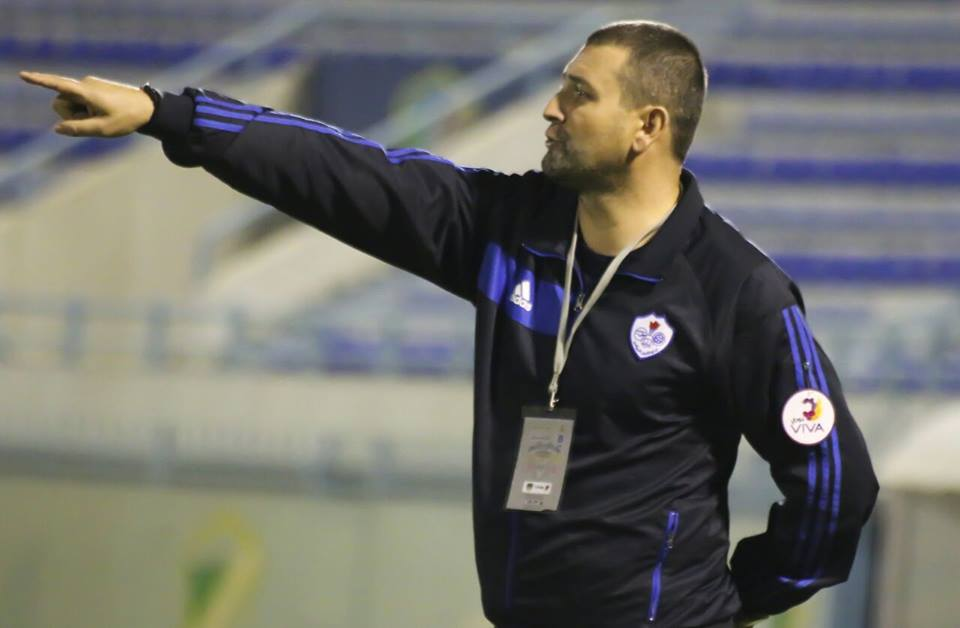
2014–15 Kuwaiti Premier League

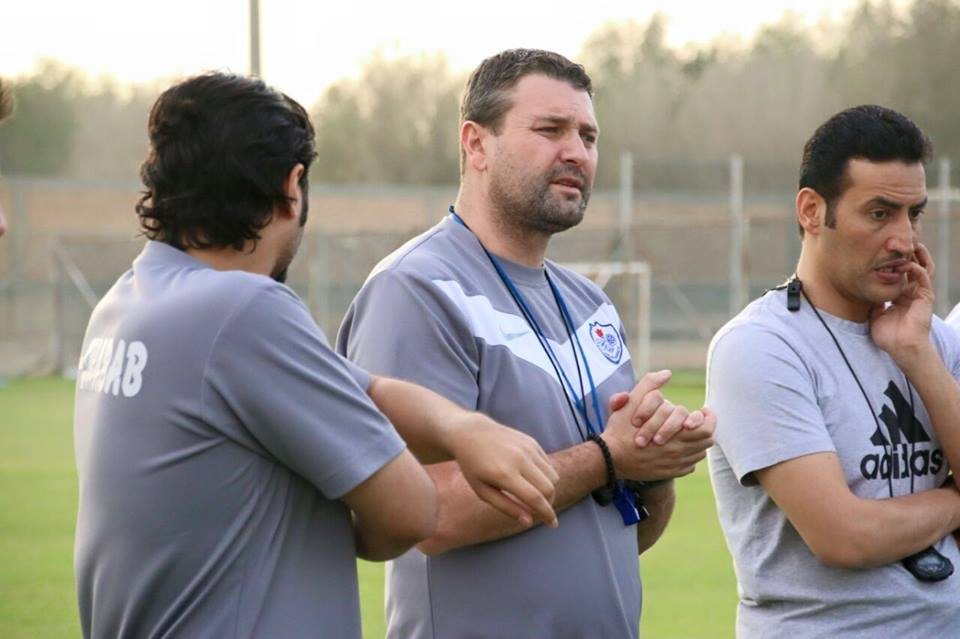
With Al-Shabab's Technical Staff

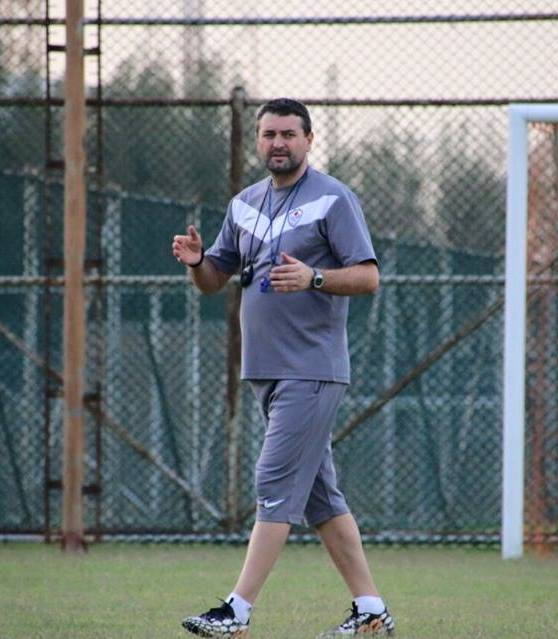
2014–15 Kuwaiti Premier League

On 23 July 2014, he again moved to Kuwait where he was appointed as the manager of Al-Shabab SC. His side finished 11th in the 2014–15 Kuwaiti Premier League with 18 points from 4 wins and 6 draws which included a 0–0 away draw against eventual winners of 2014–15 Kuwaiti Premier League, Al-Kuwait. In the 2014–15 Kuwait Emir Cup, his side first won 2–1 against Al-Fahaheel FC in the First Round but later exited from the tournament after they lost 4-0 Khaitan SC in the Second Round. In the 2014–15 Kuwait Crown Prince Cup, his side first won 12–11 on penalties against Al-Fahaheel FC after the match had ended 2–2 after full-time in the 1st Round but later exited from the tournament after a facing a 4–1 penalties defeat against Al-Yarmouk SC after the match had ended 2–2 after full-time in the Second Round. In the 2014–15 Kuwaiti Federation Cup, his side failed to progress from the Group Stage and finished at the 5th in the Group A above 6th placed Kuwaiti giants, Al-Qadsia SC.

=== Back to Saham ===
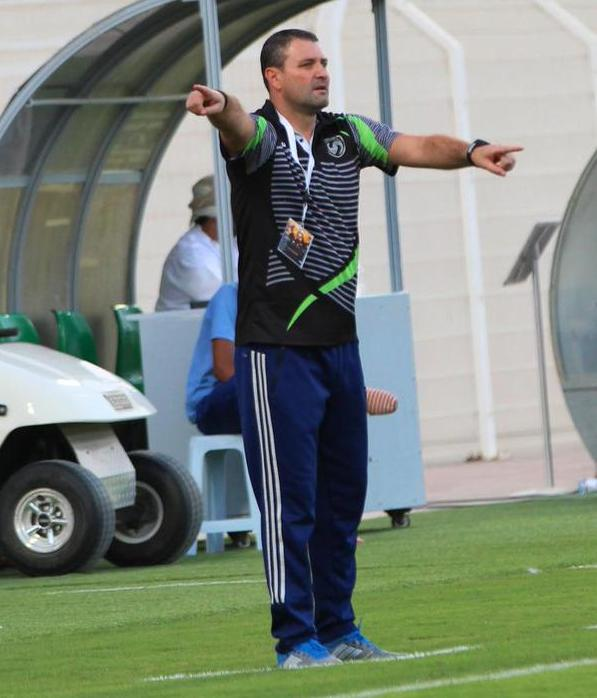
Aristică Cioabă – 2015–16 Oman Professional League

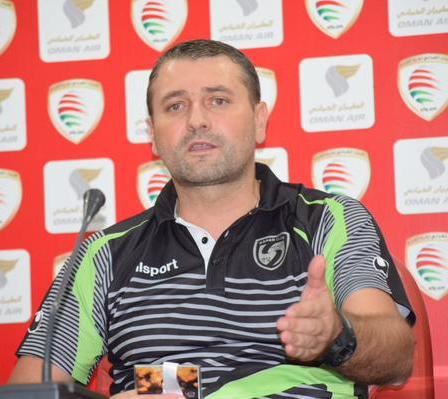
Press Conference

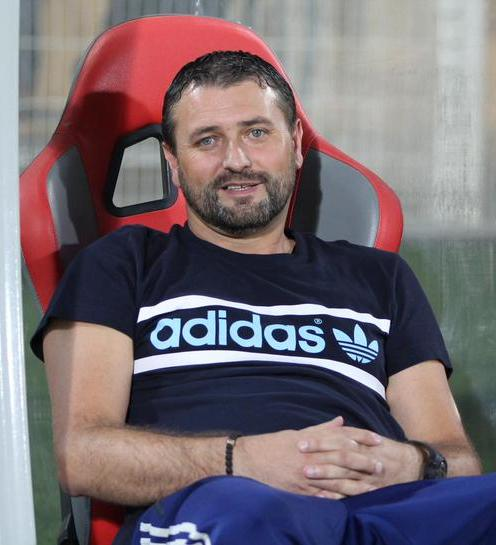
2015–16 Oman Professional League Cup

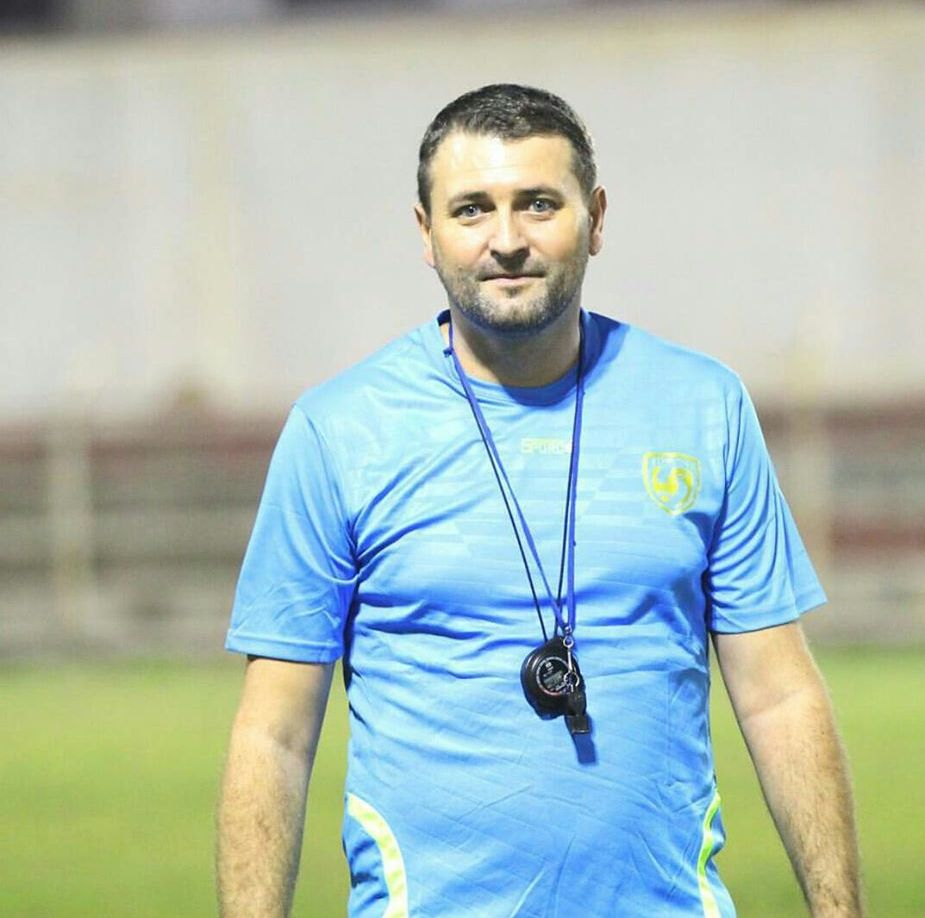
Training

On 24 June 2015, he once again returned to Oman and on 28 June 2015 he signed a one-year contract to be appointed as the manager of his former club, Saham of Oman Professional League. His club began the 2015–16 Oman Professional League campaign on 14 September 2015 in a 2–1 hard fought victory over Al-Khaboura SC. He helped his side qualify for the Quarter-finals of the 2015–16 Sultan Qaboos Cup after an emphatic 9–0 win over Oman Second Division League's, Bidia SC in the Round of 32 and a hard-fought 5–3 penalty shootout win after playing a 2–2 draw against Al-Shabab Club in the Round of 16.

On 24 January 2016, Saham Club's management decided to part ways with the Romanian manager.

=== Back to Aduana Stars ===
In March 2016, he moved back to Ghana and more accurately to Dormaa Ahenkro where on 7 March, he was appointed as the head coach of his former club Aduana Stars for the remaining of the 2016 Ghanaian Premier League.

=== Azam ===
On 5 January 2017, he signed a one-year contract to be appointed as the head coach of Tanzanian giants, Azam F.C.

== Honours ==
=== Player ===
Universitatea Cluj

- Cupa Ligii: 1998

Bihor Oradea

- Divizia B runner-up: 2002–03

=== Manager ===
Raja Casablanca

- Coupe du Trône: 2005

Saham

- Oman First Division League: 2011–12
- Oman Federation Cup runner-up: 2012–13
