= Charles Kamara Gyamfi =

Ghanaian professional footballer

Charles Kamara Gyamfi (born 7 September 1999) is a Ghanaian professional footballer who plays as a forward for Ghanaian Premier League side Aduana Stars.

== Career ==
=== Bibiani GoldStars ===
Gyamfi started his career with Bibiani GoldStars playing for them in the Zone 2 of the Ghana Division One League, before joining Aduana Stars in 2019. He was one of the top performers in the League for GoldStars during the 2017–18 season.

=== Aduana Stars ===
Gyamfi was linked to Aduana Stars in early part of 2019. He joined the Dormaa-based side February 2019. towards the start of the 2019–20 Ghana Premier League season. He made his debut on 5 February 2020, after coming on at half time for Noah Martey in a 3–1 loss to Cape Coast Ebusua Dwarfs. He went on a made 6 league appearances before it was cancelled as a result of the COVID-19 pandemic in June 2020. In November 2020, he made the cut for the 2020–21 season squad list as the league was set to restart in November 2020.
