= Marfo =

Marfo is a Ghanaian surname. Notable people with this surname include:

- Clement Marfo & The Frontline
- Darryl Marfo (born 1990), Scottish rugby player
- Edward Oppong Marfo, Ghanaian journalist
- Emmanuel Marfo, Ghanaian politician
- Kevin Marfo (born 1997), American basketball player
- Nana Amaniampong Marfo (born 1957), Ghanaian politician
- Rex Owusu Marfo, also known as Rex Omar, Ghanaian artist
