= Ibrahim Osman =

Ibrahim Osman may refer to:

- Ibrahim Osman (fencer) (born 1927), Lebanese fencer
- Ibrahim Osman (footballer, born 1999), Ghanaian footballer for Asante Kotoko
- Ibrahim Osman (footballer, born 2004), Ghanaian footballer for Brighton & Hove Albion
