= Kyeremasu =

Coordinates: 7°15′45″N 2°45′30″W

- Interactive map of Kyeremasu
- Country: Ghana
- Region: Bono Region

Population
  - Total: 9 thousand

Kyeremasu or Cheremasu is a town in the Bono region of Ghana. Kyeremasu is situated northeast of Subinkrom and 8 km southwest of Wamfie. It is located at an elevation of 296 meters above sea level and its population amounts to 29,748. Kyeremasu currently has a King and queen mother. Kyeremasu is between Dormaa Ahenkro and Wamfie. The town can boost of Modern Police Station at Kyeremasu which serves the area and its neighboring communities to deal with security issues.

== Geography ==
Kyeremasu is the third largest Town in Dormaa East District. Kyeremasu has two electoral Polling station. The current District Chief Executive is Hon. Emmanuel Kofi Agyeman as of 2021.

=== Location ===
The municipality is situated at the western part of the Bono Region.

== Education ==
The closest tertiary institution is the University of Energy and Natural Resources (Dormaa campus) . Wamanafo Commercial Day Secondary Technical School is situated 4½ km east of Kyeremasu.
