= Dormaa Central Municipal District =

Municipal District in Bono Region, Ghana

Dormaa Central Municipal District District Municipal de Dormaa-Centre
- Municipal District
- Seal

- Districts of Bono Region

- Location of Dormaa Central Municipal District within Bono Region
- Coordinates: 7°16′39″N 2°52′42″W
- Country: Ghana
- Region: Bono Region
- Capital: Dormaa Ahenkro

Government
  - Municipal Chief Executive: Asubonteng Gordon

Area
  - Total: 2,208 km^{2} (853 sq mi)

Population (2021)
  - Total: 112,702
- Time zone: UTC+0 (GMT)

Dormaa Central Municipal District is one of the twelve districts in Bono Region, Ghana. Originally it was formerly part of the then-larger Dormaa District on 10 March 1989; until the eastern part of the district was split off to create Dormaa East District on 1 November 2007 (effectively 29 February 2008); thus the remaining part has been retained as Dormaa District. However, on 28 June 2012, the southwest part of the district was split off to create Dormaa West District; while the remaining part was elevated to municipal district assembly status on that same year to become Dormaa Central Municipal District. The municipality is located in the southwest part of Bono Region and has Dormaa Ahenkro as its capital town.

== List of settlements ==
Settlements of Dormaa Central Municipal District
No.	Settlement	Population	Population year
1	Aboabo No. 1-4		
2	Masu		
3	Kuren		
4	Manteware		
5	Kokorasua		
6	Benekrom/Badukrom		
7	Antwirifo/Suromani		
8	Asikasu		
9	Asunsu No.1		
10	Kyekyewere		
11	Babianeha		
12	Danyame		
13	Yawkrom		
14	Dormaa-Ahenkro		
15	Dormaa-Agyemankrom		
16	Kofiasua		
17	KofiBaduKrom		
18	Kofikumikrom		
19	Kyeremasu		
20	Duasidan		
21	Nsesereso		
22	Nsuhia		
23	Gonokrom		
24	Yawbofokrom		
25	Kwakubedikrom		

== Sources ==
- "Dormaa Central Municipal District". Statoids.
- District: Dormaa Central Municipal District
