= Fataho Nerie =

Ghanaian footballer (born 2008)

Personal information
- Date of birth: 12 December 2008 (age 17)
- Position: Midfielder

Team information
- Current team: Aduana Stars
- Number: 32

Youth career
- Atesikrom

Senior career*
Years	Team	Apps	(Gls)
2022–	Aduana Stars	4	(0)
- * Club domestic league appearances and goals as of 23 December 2022

Fataho Nerie (born 12 December 2008) is a Ghanaian footballer who currently plays as a midfielder for Ghana Premier League side Aduana Stars.

== Club career ==
Nerie became the youngest player to ever feature in the Ghana Premier League when he made his debut on 11 September 2022 against Hearts of Oak, aged 13 years, 8 months and 30 days.

== Career statistics ==
=== Club ===
As of 23 December 2022.

Club	Season	League			Cup		Continental		Other		Total	
Club	Season	Division	Apps	Goals	Apps	Goals	Apps	Goals	Apps	Goals	Apps	Goals
Aduana Stars	2022–23	Ghana Premier League	4	0	0	0	–		0	0	4	0
Career total			4	0	0	0	0	0	0	0	4	0
