= Fabin =

Fabin may refer to:

- Li Fabin (born 1993), Chinese weightlifter and Olympic medalist
- Paa Kwesi Fabin (born 1959), Ghanaian football manager and coach
