= Akuoko =

Akuoko is a Ghanaian surname. Notable people with the surname include:

- AJ Akuoko-Sarpong (born 1991), Ghanaian media personality
- Ebenezer Augustus Kwasi Akuoko (1928–2021), Ghanaian lawyer and politician
- Emmanuel Akuoko (born 1983), Ghanaian footballer
- Nana Akuoko Sarpong (born 1938), Ghanaian traditional ruler and politician
- Richard Akuoko Adiyiah (1955–2022), Ghanaian politician
