= Joseph Addo =

Joseph Addo may refer to:

- Joe Addo (born 1971), Ghanaian footballer
- Joseph Addo (footballer, born 1990), Ghanaian footballer
