= Milisav Bogdanović =

Montenegrin football manager

Personal information
- Date of birth: 19 September 1955 (age 71)
- Place of birth: PR Montenegro, FPR Yugoslavia

Managerial career
- Years: Team
- 1981–1983: Libya
- 1986–1990: Olympic Azzaweya
- 1990–1995: Al-Ittihad Tripoli
- 1995–1996: Al Akhdar
- 1998: Ħamrun Spartans
- 2001–2003: CO Transports
- 2003–2004: US Tébessa
- 2004: CR Belouizdad
- 2004–2006: CRB Aïn Fakroun
- 2009: MSP Batna
- 2010–2011: Séwé
- 2011: Bechem United
- 2012: Africa Sports
- 2013: Bechem United
- 2013–2014: Aduana Stars
- 2014–2017: Bechem United

Milisav Bogdanović (born 19 September 1955) is a Montenegrin former football manager.

== Early life ==
He has been nicknamed "Mamba".

== Career ==
In 1981, he was appointed manager of the Libya national football team. In 1986, he was appointed manager of Libyan side Olympic Azzaweya SC. In 1990, he was appointed manager of Libyan side Al-Ittihad Club. In 1995, he was appointed manager of Libyan side Al Akhdar SC. In 1996, he was appointed manager of Maltese side Ħamrun Spartans FC. In 2001, he was appointed manager of Tunisian side Club Olympique des Transports. In 2003, he was appointed manager of Algerian side US Tébessa. In 2004, he was appointed manager of Algerian side CR Belouizdad. After that, he was appointed manager of Algerian side CRB Aïn Fakroun. In 2009, he was appointed manager of Algerian side MSP Batna. In 2010, he was appointed manager of Ivorian side Séwé FC. He managed the club at the CAF Confederations Cup. In 2011, he was appointed manager of Ghanaian side Bechem United FC. In 2012, he was appointed manager of Ivorian side Africa Sports d'Abidjan. In 2013, he returned to Ghanaian side Bechem United FC. After that, he was appointed manager of Ghanaian side Aduana Stars FC. He helped the club escape relegation. In 2014, he returned to Ghanaian side Bechem United FC. He was described as "credited for shaping the play of Bechem United and Aduana Stars during his stay with both clubs".

== Personal life ==
He has children who live in Malta. He obtained Ghanaian citizenship. He is a native of Piva, Montenegro.
