= Edward Oppong Marfo =

Ghanaian journalist

- Born: Bomaa, Ahafo Region, Ghana
- Education: Ebenezer Preparatory School, Bomaa; Tepa Senior High School; Kwame Nkrumah University of Science and Technology (BA, MPhil)
- Occupation: Broadcast journalist
- Years active: 2010–present
- Employer: Citi FM and Citi TV
- Organization: Omni Media
- Known for: Bureau Chief for Middle Belt (Ashanti, Bono, Bono East, Ahafo Regions)
- Awards: Best Radio Show Host – NUGS KNUST (2017); Most Promising Alumni – NUGS KNUST (2018); Most Hardworking Executive – GRASAG KNUST (2018)

Edward Oppong Marfo is a Ghanaian journalist with Citi FM and Citi TV. He is the bureau chief for the Middle belt- Ashanti, Bono, Bono East and Ahafo Region at Citi FM and Citi TV.

== Education ==
Edward Oppong Marfo attended Ebenezer Preparatory School at Bomaa in the Ahafo Region. He proceeded to Tepa Senior High School in the Ashanti Region. He obtained his first degree in Bachelor of Arts in Akan (Major) and Political Studies (Minor) at the Kwame Nkrumah University of Science and Technology. He later had a Master of Philosophy in political science at the Kwame Nkrumah University of Science and Technology from 2016 to 2018.

== Life and career ==
Edward Oppong Marfo was born in Bomaa in the Ahafo region of Ghana to Mr. David Oppong Marfo and Mrs. Martha Oppong. He began his media career in 2010 when he joined a campus based radio station, Focus FM while at the Kwame Nkrumah University of Science and Technology in Kumasi. Edward rose through the ranks from a reporter, News anchor, Morning show host and eventually became the News editor of the station. He worked at Focus FM for 8 years until he left for, Citi FM and Citi TV in November 2018.

== Major reports ==
- Ejura committee hearing, July 2021: Edward Oppong Marfo, on Wednesday, July 7, 2021, testified before the ministerial committee probing the disturbances that occurred at Ejura in the Ashanti Region.

== Awards ==
Year	Nominee / work	Award	Result
2017	Edward Oppong Marfo	National Union of Ghana Students (NUGS KNUST), Best Radio Show Host of the year	Won
2018	Edward Oppong Marfo	National Union of Ghana Students (NUGS KNUST), Most Promising Alumni,	Won
2018	Edward Oppong Marfo	Graduate Student Association of Ghana (GRASAG KNUST), Most Hard working Executive,	Won
