= Samuel Bioh =

Ghanaian professional footballer (born 1995)

Samuel Bioh (born 20 February 1995) is a Ghanaian professional footballer who plays as a forward for Ghanaian Premier League side Aduana Stars. He previously played for Tema Youth, Medeama SC and Sudanese side Al Khartoum.

== Club career ==
=== Tema Youth ===
Bioh started his career with Tema Youth before securing a move to Medeama SC in 2013.

=== Medeama SC ===
Bioh joined Medeama in August 2013. He featured for the club until 2016, in the process winning the Ghanaian FA Cup and the Ghanaian Super Cup in 2015 and 2016 respectively.

=== Al Khartoum ===
In December 2016, Bioh joined Sudanese-side Khartoum NC on after being recommended by then Ghanaian compatriot coach Kwesi Appiah who happen to be the head coach of the club and former Black Stars coach. He signed a three-year deal with the club. He terminated his contract in February 2018, with one year more left on his contract.

=== Aduana Stars ===
After being unattached for months, Bioh was linked with a move to several clubs including his former club Medeama and two newly promoted sides Karela FC and Techiman Eleven Wonders. However, in March 2018, he signed for then league defending champions Aduana Stars. He signed a three-year with the Dormaa-based side during the 2018 Ghana Premier League season.

On 25 February 2021, he scored in the 74th minute of a match against Asante Kotoko to secure a 1–0 victory over the Kumasi-based team and grant them their first away win of the 2020–21 Ghana Premier League season.

== Style of play ==
Bioh plays as a midfielder who usually operates as a left winger or a left midfielder. Due to his position, he is very quick player who plays with speed and a good dribbler. In April 2020, During the 2019–20 season, Asante Kotoko's left back Christopher Nettey named him as the toughest opponent he had faced within the season.

== Honours ==
=== Club ===
Medeama

- Ghanaian FA Cup: 2015
- Ghana Super Cup: 2016
