= Yusif Abubakar =

Ghanaian football manager (died 2018)

Personal information
- Date of death: 20 November 2018 (aged 60)

Managerial career
- Years: Team
- Medeama
- Berekum Chelsea
- Aduana Stars
- Hearts of Oak
- 2016: Techiman City
- 2018: Ghana U23

Yusif Abubakar (died 20 November 2018) was a Ghanaian football coach who managed Medeama, Berekum Chelsea, Aduana Stars, Hearts of Oak and Ghana under-23s. He also managed Techiman City, leaving in June 2016 after five months in the role.
