= Bright Adjei =

Ghanaian footballer (born 1994)

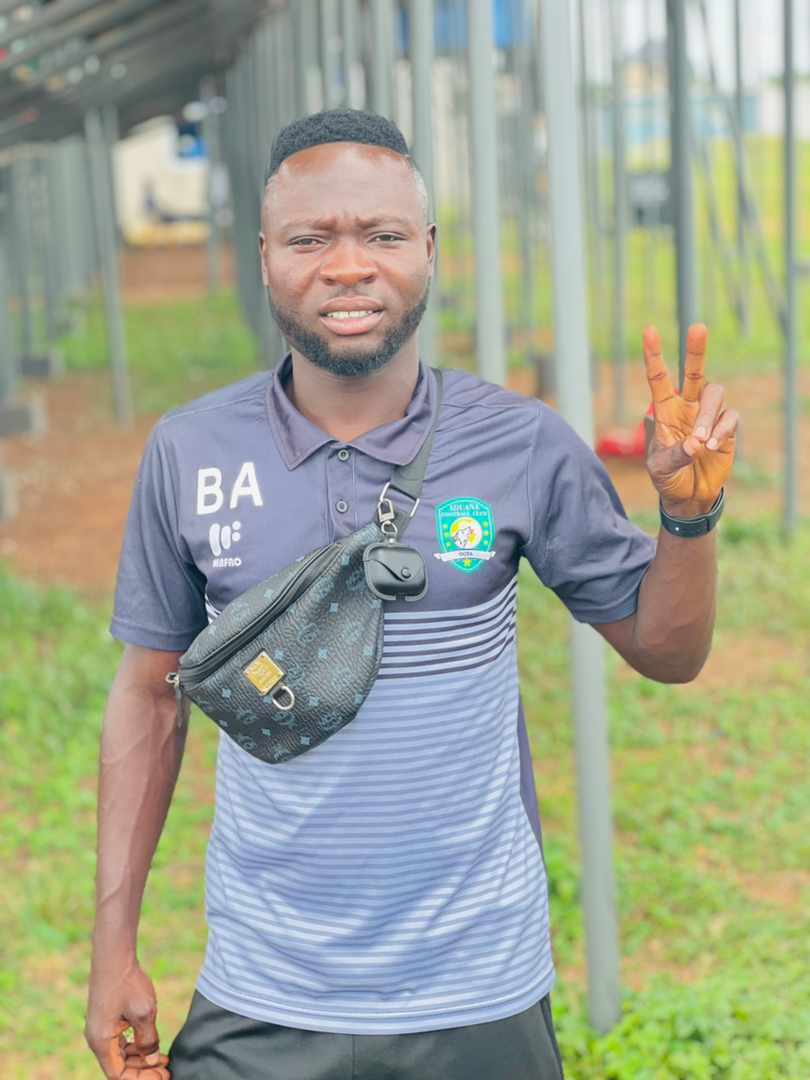

Personal information
- Full name: Bright Adjei
- Date of birth: 27 April 1994 (age 32)
- Place of birth: Ghana
- Position: Forward

Team information
- Current team: Aduana F.C.
- Number: 10

Youth career
- 2010–2012: Elmina Sharks

Senior career*
Years	Team	Apps	(Gls)
2012–2015	Tema Youth		
2015 — 2018	Aduana F.C.	37	(23)
2018 – 2019	Burgan SC	40	(10)
2019 – 2022/23	Aduana F.C.	64	(26)
2022/23	Singida Big Stars	12	(05)
2023/24	Aduana F.C. (Loan)	17	(7)
2025/26	Aduana F.C.	14	(0)
- * Club domestic league appearances and goals as of 29 December 2025

Bright Adjei (born 27 April 1994) is a Ghanaian professional footballer who plays as a forward for Ghana Premier League side Aduana Football Club.

In his career, Adjei won the Ghana Premier League in his second season with Aduana Stars. He also previously played for Tema Youth and Kuwaiti side Burgan.

== Club career ==
=== Elmina Sharks ===
Adjei started his career with Elmina Sharks in 2010. He played for the club in the lower-tiers until 2012 when he secured a move to Tema Youth.

=== Tema Youth ===
In 2012, Adjei secured a move to Tema Youth. He made his debut and featured for the club in the 2012–13 Ghanaian Premier League. Adjei scored his debut topflight goal in a 1–1 draw against Real Tamale United. That season, he scored several goals with notable ones against top sides, Medeama, Ashanti Gold and Real Tamale United. Adjei also scored a hat-trick in a 3–2 win against New Edubiase. However, his goals could not secure their safety in the Ghana Premier League. He played an instrumental role in Tema Youth's second-place finish in the second-tier league, Ghana Division One League in 2015, finishing as the club's top scorer. In October 2015, he was linked with a move to Ghana Premier League side Aduana Stars.

=== Aduana Stars ===
In December 2015, Aduana Stars announced that they had secured the services of Adjei and Zakaria Mumuni on a 3-year contract ahead of the 2016 Ghana Premier League campaign. In his debut season, he immediately established himself as a key player for the club playing 15 out of 30 matches and scoring a whopping 12 goals to help Aduana Stars to a second position with 49 points only missing out on the ultimate by 2 points to eventual winners Wa All Stars. In March 2016, his 85th minute acrobatic goal against Ashanti Gold in game week 4 of the league at Len Clay Stadium in Obuasi, was nominated for the CNN Goal of the Week award. He beat off competition from Barcelona's Luis Suarez, Celtic's Tom Rogic, and Pumas' Javier Cortés to poll 81 per cent of the total votes cast to win the award.

In August 2016, Adjei scored another overhead kick goal in Aduana's 1–1 draw at WAFA in Sogakope during the match day 27 Ghana Premier League match, which earned him another nomination for the CNN Goal of the Week award. He won for the second time beating the likes of Bayern Munich's Xabi Alonso, Anderlecht's Łukasz Teodorczyk and Elliot Durrell of Chester. He became the first ever two-time winner of the award.

The following season, 2017 season, he continued his impressive form by playing 17 league matches and scoring 7 goals to help Aduana secure the club's second league title in their history. During that period he formed a good attacking partnership with Yahaya Mohammed. In April 2017, it was reported that he had flown in to Sudan to sign a two-year contract with Sudanese giants, Al Hilal, the deal however fell through and he returned to Aduana Stars.

=== Burgan ===
In August 2019, Adjei joined Kuwaiti side Burgan SC on a free transfer after his contract with Aduana Stars ended. He signed a one-year deal with an option to extend the contract at the end.

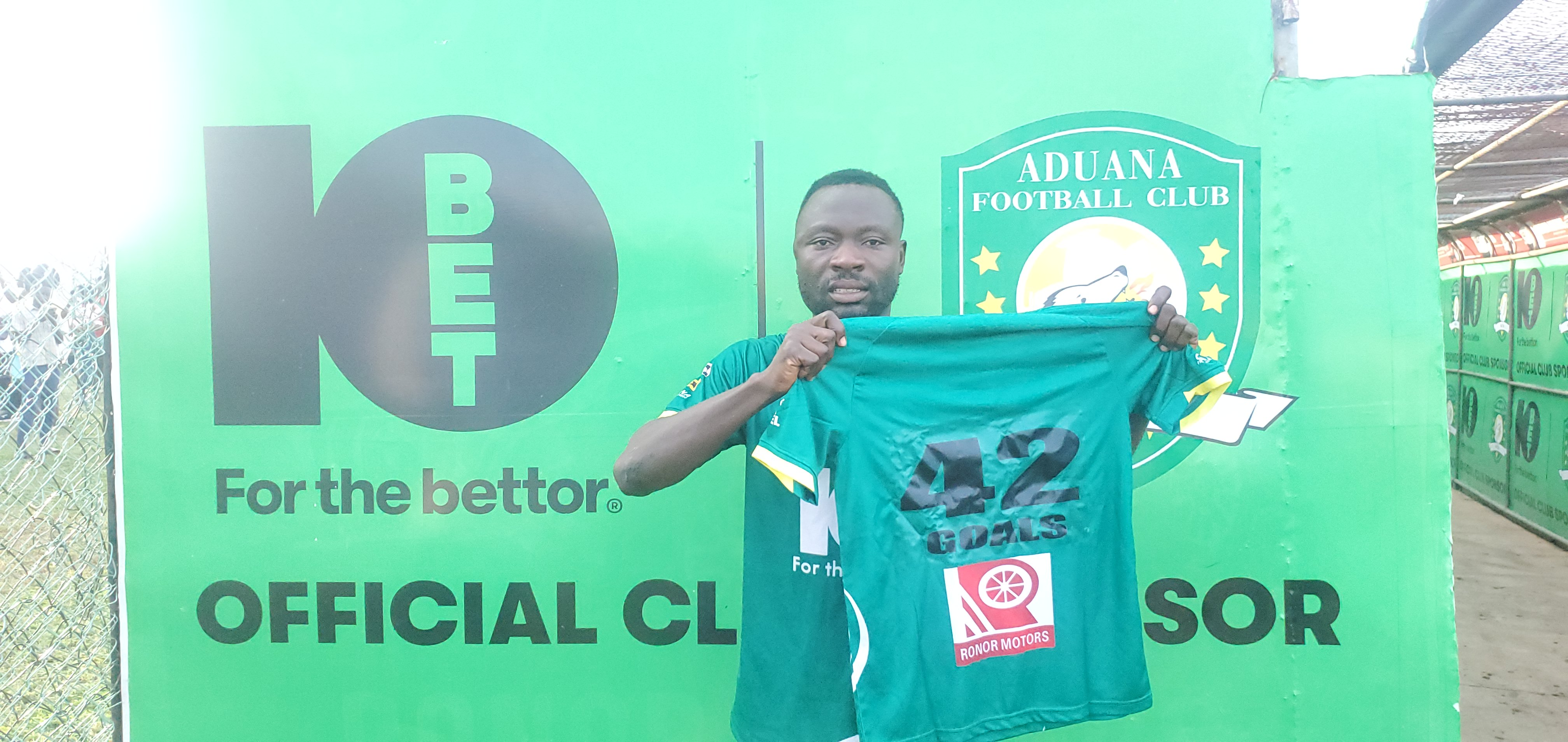
Aduana FC supporters honouring Adjei after his record 42 goals.

=== Return to Aduana Stars ===
After 6 months into his contract with Kuwaiti side, Adjei returned to Ghana and joined his previous club Aduana Stars. There were rumours that he was in advantaged stage of signing for Accra Hearts of Oak. On 22 December 2020, he scored the equalizer to help Aduana salvage a draw in a 1–1 Bono derby match against rivals Berekum Chelsea. Since his return to Aduana Football Club, Bright went on to play 58 Matches scoring 24 goals making him the all-time top scorer of Aduana FC with 42 goals, surpassing Yahaya Mohammed, who had 41.

== International career ==
Adjei was a member of the Ghana national under-23 football team, the Black Meteors in 2015. He was a member of the squad that featured during the 2015 All-African Games in Brazzaville, Republic of the Congo. He also earned call-ups to the local Black Stars in the past.

== Honours ==
Aduana Stars

- Ghana Premier League: 2017
- Ghana Super Cup: 2018

Individual

- CNN Goal of the Week Award (2): (March 2016, August 2016)
- Ghana Premier League Player of the month: February 2022
