= Zakaria Mumuni =

Ghanaian footballer

Personal information
- Date of birth: 11 December 1996 (age 29)
- Position: Forward

Team information
- Current team: Aduana Stars F.C.

Senior career*
Years	Team	Apps	(Gls)
2012–2015	West African Football Academy		
2016–	Aduana Stars F.C.		

International career^{‡}
2015–	Ghana	2	(0)
- * Club domestic league appearances and goals ‡ National team caps and goals as of 5 November 2019

Zakaria Mumuni (born 11 December 1996) is a Ghanaian football striker for Aduana Stars.
