= Oba Ikama Ulitch =

Congolese footballer (born 2000)

Personal information
- Date of birth: 2 February 2000 (age 26)
- Place of birth: Brazzaville, Congo
- Height: 1.74 m (5 ft 9 in)
- Position: Midfielder

Team information
- Current team: US Ben Guerdane
- Number: 32

Senior career*
Years	Team	Apps	(Gls)
2017-2018	AS Ponténégrine		
2018–2020	Aduana Stars	13	(1)
2021–2023	US Ben Guerdane	24	(0)

International career
2016	Congo U17	4	
2017	Congo U20	5	
2017	Congo U23	2	
2017–	Congo	3	
- * Club domestic league appearances and goals

Oba Ikama Ulitch (born 2 February 2000) is a Congolese professional footballer who plays as a forward for Tunisian Premier League side US Ben Guerdane.

== Club career ==
=== AS Ponténégrine ===
Ulitch played for Congolese team AS Ponténégrine before joining Aduana Stars in 2017.

=== Aduana Stars ===
Ulitch joined Ghanaian club Aduana Stars on 16 December 2017 ahead of the 2018 Ghana Premier League and the 2018 CAF Champions League campaign. He signed a three-year deal with the Dormaa-based club. He made his debut on 10 May 2018, full 90 minutes and in the process scoring his debut goal as well in the 12th minute to help secure a 3–2 win over Liberty Professionals. He was adjudged the man of the match at the end of the match. Due to the abandonment of the league due to the dissolution of the GFA in June 2018, which came about as a result of the Anas Number 12 Expose, he ranked five league appearances and scored a goal. He went on to play 5 matches during the 2019 GFA Normalization Committee Special Competition.

== International career ==
Ulitch is a former member of the Congo national under-20 football team.
