= Dormaa West (district) =

District in Bono Region, Ghana

Dormaa West District
- District
- Districts of Bono Region

- Location of Domraa West District within Bono Region
- Coordinates: 7°01′N 3°03′W
- Country: Ghana
- Region: Bono Region
- Capital: Nkrankwanta

Area
  - Total: 379.6 km^{2} (146.6 sq mi)

Population (2021 Census)
  - Total: 47,913
  - Density: 126.2/km^{2} (326.9/sq mi)
- Time zone: UTC+0 (GMT)

Dormaa West District is one of the twelve districts in Bono Region, Ghana. Originally it was formerly part of the then-larger Dormaa District on 10 March 1989; until the southwest part of the district was split off to create Dormaa West District on 28 June 2012; thus the remaining part was later elevated to municipal district assembly status and has been renamed as Dormaa Central Municipal District. The district assembly is located in the western part of Bono Region and has Nkrankwanta as its capital town.

== Sources ==
- "Dormaa West District". Statoids.
