= Noah Martey =

Ghanaian professional footballer

Noah Martey (born 24 July 1995) is a Ghanaian professional footballer who lasted played as a midfielder for Ghanaian Premier League side Aduana Stars. He previously playing for Bechem United.

== Club career ==
=== Bechem United ===
Martey started his career with Bechem United in 2014. After scoring a total of six goals and setting the record as the only player to score in five consecutive matches, he was adjudged as GPL Player of the Month for February. He managed to score three away goals and scored in each of the three home games in February. At the end of the 2015 Ghanaian Premier League season, he scored 10 goals to end the season as the club's top goalscorer. His performance at the end of the season attracted clubs from Ghana and other clubs overseas. He reportedly turned down a trial session with Portuguese side Vitória S.C. and joined Aduana Stars.

=== Aduana Stars ===
Martey joined Aduana Stars in January 2016 ahead of the start of the 2016 Ghana Premier League season. He signed a two-year contract with the Dormaa-based club. On 21 February 2016, he made his debut coming on in the 50th minute for Seth Opare in a 2–0 loss to International Allies. He made 15 league appearances and scored a goal to help Aduana place 2nd trailing by just two points to league winners Wa All Stars. The following season, 2017 season, he played a more influential role by playing 27 league matches out of 30 and scored 2 goals to help Aduana win the league title. He sustained an injury the following season, limiting his league appearances in the truncated 2018 Ghana Premier League.

He made his return from injury during the 2019–20 season of which he played 9 league matches and scored a goal before the league was cancelled as a result of the COVID-19 pandemic in June 2020.

Martey was named on the squad list for the upcoming 2020–21 season as the league was set to restart in November 2020, he however did not make any league appearance before leaving the club in 2021. On 3 May 2021, after a four-year stint with Aduana Stars, he ended his stay with the club by mutual consent and penned down an appreciation letter to the club and its fans. Part of his statement read;

“I appreciate every time l spent in the club as part of the team. I thank the entire leadership of the team from the staff to the players” Not forgetting the wonderful fan base of the club for their love and support for me when I was with the club”.

He won the Ghana Premier League in 2017 and the Ghana Super Cup in 2018 during his 4-year period with them.

== International career ==
=== Ghana U-20 ===
Martey received call-ups and was part of the Ghana national under-20 football team in 2015 during the 2015 Africa Youth Championship qualifiers, he however didn't make the final squad for the tournament.

=== Ghana U-23 ===
From October 2014 to December 2014, he was given call-ups to the Ghana national under-23 football team ahead of qualifiers of the All Africa Games and Olympic Games. On 8 November 2014, he come on as a substitute during the International friendly match 1–0 loss against the Super Eagles, Nigeria on the occasion of the opening of the Akwa Ibom International Stadium, located in Uyo, a city in south-eastern Nigeria.

=== Local Black Stars ===
He received his first call up to the Ghana A' national football team, the Local Black Stars in March 2015 ahead of the 2016 CHAN qualifiers. In May 2015, he was named on the initial 26 man squad list for the 2015 COSAFA Cup, but he was dropped and did not make the final 20 squad list for the tournament.

== Honours ==
Aduana Stars

- Ghana Premier League: 2017
- Ghana Super Cup: 2018

Individual

- GPL Player of the month: February 2015
