= Adams Farouk =

Ghanaian professional footballer

Adams Farouk (born 3 April 1989) is a Ghanaian professional footballer who plays as a defender for Ghanaian Premier League side Aduana Stars. He was previously playing for Bibiani Gold Stars and Elmina Sharks.

== Career ==
=== Bibiani Gold Stars ===
Farouk started his career playing in the Zone 2 of the Ghana Division One League with Bibiani Gold Stars F.C.

=== Elmina Sharks ===
Farouk joined Elmina Sharks in January 2017 ahead of their maiden Ghana Premier League season. He played 17 league matches during the 2017 Ghanaian Premier League, helping them to a 7th-place finish in his only season with the club.

=== Aduana Stars ===
On 6 January 2018, Farouk joined Aduana Stars. He signed a three-year contract with the club ahead of the 2018 Ghana Premier League season. During the 2019–20 season, he made 13 league appearances before the league was cancelled as a result of the COVID-19 pandemic in June 2020. With the league set to restart in November 2020 for the 2020–21 season, he made the squad list for the season even though his contract with club was set to expire in January 2021. On 26 January 2021, he extended his contract with the club by an extra year after missing 4 league matches.
