= Ali Maiga Halidu =

Ghanaian politician

Member of the Ghana Parliament for Dormaa West Constituency

Personal details
- Born: March 11, 1980 (age 46)
- Party: New Patriotic Party

Ali Maiga Halidu is a Ghanaian politician and member of the Seventh Parliament of the Fourth Republic of Ghana representing the Dormaa West Constituency in the Brong-Ahafo Region on the ticket of the New Patriotic Party.

== Early life ==
Ali Maiga Halidu was born on March 11, 1980. He is from the Nkrankwanta, in the Brong Ahafo Region.

== Education ==
Halidu acquired his bachelor's degree at the University of Cape Coast; he then furthered his education with a Master of Philosophy at the Cambridge in the United Kingdom.

== Career ==
Halidu worked as a teaching assistant at the University of Cape Coast for a year and then he worked as a professional teacher with the Ghana Education Service for a year from 2006 to 2007. He became a regulatory officer for the foods and agriculture authority for 3 years . He is currently a development consultant and a full-time politician.

== Politics ==
In the 2016 general elections Halidu contested and won the parliamentary seat for the Dormaa West Constituency in the Brong-Ahafo Region, on the ticket of the New Patriotic Party. He obtained 8,422 votes out of the 16,725 valid votes cast representing 50.88% of the votes.

== Personal life ==
Ali Maiga Halidu is married with six children. He is a Muslim.
