= 2011 WAFU Club Championship =

The 2011 Wafu Club Championship (sometimes referred to as the Eyadema Unity Cup) is an association football competition that will be contested between club sides in the WAFU/UFOA region.

== Teams ==
- (The Gambia) GAMTEL FC
- (Ghana) Aduana Stars
- (Guinea) Athlético de Coléah
- (Guinea) Horoya AC
- (Liberia) Mighty Barrolle
- (Liberia) Watanga FC
- (Niger) Akokana FC
- (Niger) Dan Kassawa FC
- (Nigeria) Kwara United
- (Nigeria) Enugu Rangers
- (Senegal) ASC Niarry-Tally
- (Senegal) ASC HLM

== First round ==
First leg games played June 19–21 (Kwara vs Aduana postponed to July 8)

Team 1	Agg.	Team 2	1st leg	2nd leg
Horoya AC (Guinea)	w/o	(Senegal) ASC HLM	--	--
ASC Niarry-Tally (Senegal)	4-5(pen.)	(The Gambia) GAMTEL	0-0	0-0
Athlético de Coléah (Guinea)	-	Bye	-	-
Enugu Rangers (Nigeria)	5-0	(Liberia) Mighty Barrolle	5-0	w/o
Aduana Stars (Ghana)	w/o	(Nigeria) Kwara United	-	-
Akokana FC (Niger)	-	Bye	-	-
	-		-	-

== Second round ==
Team 1	Agg.	Team 2	1st leg	2nd leg
Horoya AC (Guinea)	3-2	(Guinea) Athlético de Coléah	3-1	0-1
GAMTEL (The Gambia)	-	Bye	-	-
Kwara United (Nigeria)	0-3	(Nigeria) Enugu Rangers	0-1	0-2
Akokana FC (Niger)	-	Bye	-	-

== Third round ==
First Leg played on August 20–21. Second Leg played September 10–11

Team 1	Agg.	Team 2	1st leg	2nd leg
GAMTEL (The Gambia)	4-1	(Guinea) Horoya AC	3-0	1-1
Akokana FC (Niger)	0-4	(Nigeria) Enugu Rangers	0-1	0-3

== Repechage ==
Horoya AC advances over Akokana FC by walkover.

== Semifinals ==
9 December 2011

GAMTEL	2 - 2 (4-2 pen)	Horoya AC

Lomé
9 December 2011

Dynamic Togolais	1 - 1 (3-1 pen)	Enugu Rangers
	Report

Lomé

=== Third Place ===
11 December 2011

Horoya AC	1 - 1 12-13 (pen)	Enugu Rangers
	Report

Lomé

=== Final ===
11 December 2011
5:00pm

Dynamic Togolais	2 - 1 (A.E.D.)	GAMTEL FC
Ibrahim Abdoulaye 40'; Salami Wassiou 99'	Report	Assan Cesay

Lomé

WAFU Club Championship 2011 Winners
(Togo)
Dynamic Togolais
First title
