= Dormaa District =

Dormaa District District de Dormaa
- Former District
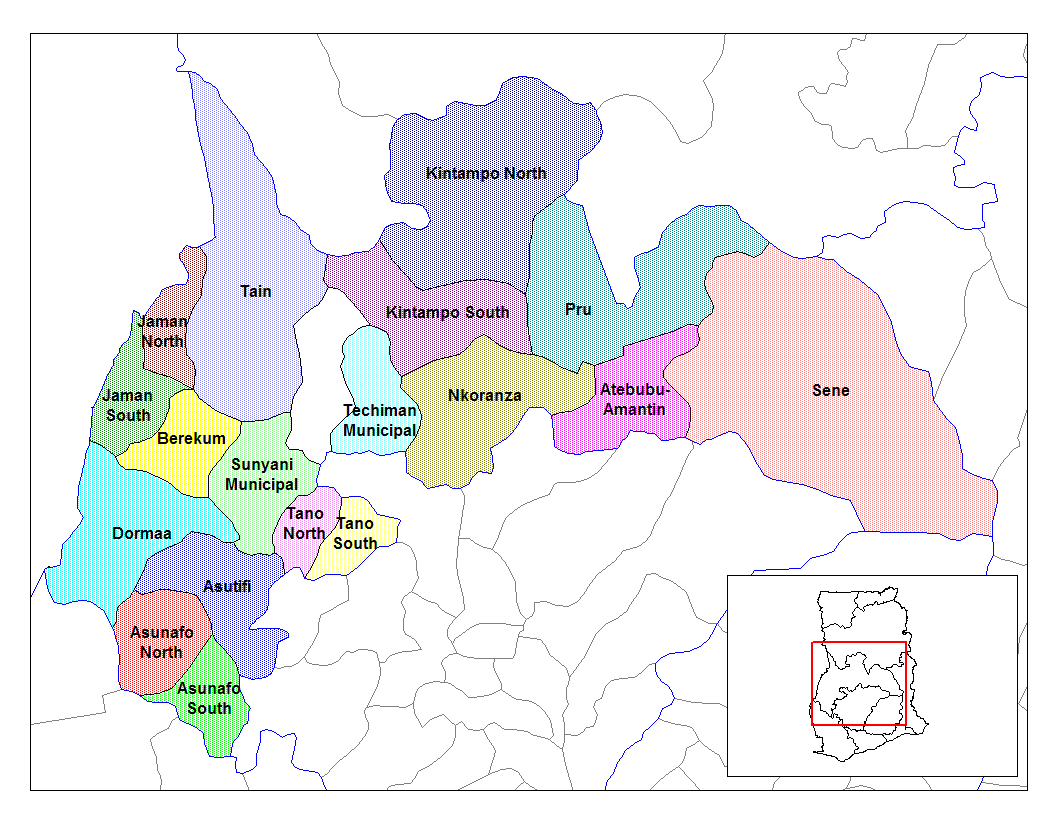
- Districts of Brong-Ahafo Region

- Location of Dormaa District within Brong-Ahafo
- Coordinates: 7°16′39″N 2°52′42″W
- Country: Ghana
- Region: Brong-Ahafo
- Capital: Dormaa Ahenkro

Government
  - Municipal Chief Executive: Asubonteng Gordon
- Time zone: UTC+0 (GMT)

Dormaa District is a former district that was located in Brong-Ahafo Region (now currently in Bono Region), Ghana. Originally created as an ordinary district assembly on 10 March 1989. However, on 1 November 2007 (effective 29 February 2008), it was split off into two new districts by a decree of president John Agyekum Kufuor: Dormaa Central District (which it was elevated to municipal district assembly status on 28 June 2012; capital: Dormaa Ahenkro) and Dormaa East District (capital: Wamfie). The district assembly was located in the western part of Brong-Ahafo Region (now southwest part of Bono Region) and had Dormaa Ahenkro as its capital town.
