= Thomas Kwame Yeboah =

Ghanaian politician

Member of parliament for Dormaa West Constituency
- In office 7 January 1993 – 6 January 2001
- President: John Jerry Rawlings

Personal details
- Born: 5 July 1959 Dormaa West, Brong Ahafo Region, Ghana
- Party: National Democratic Congress
- Education: University of Ghana
- Occupation: Politician

Thomas Kwame Yeboah (born 5 July 1959) is a Ghanaian politician and a member of the Second Parliament of the Fourth Republic representing the Dormaa West Constituency in the Brong Ahafo Region of Ghana.

== Early life and education ==
Yeboah was born on 5 July 1959, in Dormaa West in the Brong Ahafo Region of Ghana. He attended the university University of Ghana and obtained his Bachelor of Arts after Studying Political Science with Sociology.

== Politics ==
Yeaboah was elected into the first parliament of the fourth republic of Ghana on 7 January 1993, after he was pronounced winner at the 1992 Ghanaian parliamentary election held on 29 December 1992. He was therefore re-elected into the second parliament of the fourth republic of Ghana on 7 January after he emerged winner at the 1996 Ghanaian general elections on the ticket of the National Democratic Congress for the Dormaa West Constituency in the Brong Ahafo Region of Ghana. He lost in the 2000 Ghanaian Elections to Yaw Asiedu-Mensah of the New Patriotic Party who polled 20,331 out of the 40,666 valid votes cast representing 49.92%.
