= Nkrankwanta =

Coordinates: 7°01′N 3°03′W

- Interactive map of Nkrankwanta
- Country: Ghana
- Region: Bono region

Nkrankwanta is a town located in the Bono Region of Ghana, near the border of Ivory Coast. This town is the capital of Dormaa West (district). Notable educational institution located in this town is the Nkrankwanta Commercial Secondary School. The school is a second cycle institution.
