= Yaw Asiedu-Mensah =

Ghanaian politician

Hon. Yaw Asiedu-Mensah

Member of Parliament for Dormaa West Constituency
- In office 7 January 2005 – 6 January 2009
- President: John Kufuor

Member of Parliament for Dormaa West Constituency
- In office 7 January 2001 – 6 January 2005
- President: John Kufuor

Personal details
- Born: 26 January 1939 (age 87)
- Party: New Patriotic Party
- Profession: Educationist

Yaw Asiedu-Mensah was a Ghanaian politician and Member of Parliament for the Dormaa West constituency of the Brong Ahafo region of Ghana.

== Early life and education ==
Asiedu-Mensah was born on 26 January 1939. He has a GCE A Level Certificate in Education.

== Career ==
Asiedu-Mensah is a Teacher by profession.

== Political career ==
=== 2000 Elections ===
Asiedu-Mensah first entered parliament as the member of parliament for the Dormaa West constituency after he won the constituency election in the 2000 Ghanaian general elections. He thus represented the constituency in the 3rd parliament of the 4th republic of Ghana. Asiedu-Mensah was elected with 20,331votes out of 40,665 total valid votes cast. This was equivalent to 50.0% of total valid votes cast. He was elected over Thomas Kwame Yeboah of the National Democratic Congress, Dr. Solomon Anso Manson an independent candidate, Chou-En-Lai Paul Ankomah of the National Reform Party, Kofi Adu-Gyamfi of the Convention People's Party, Christopher AA-Bagme of the People's National Convention and Arhin Seth Asante of the United Ghana Movement. These obtained 17,618 votes, 1,088votes, 588votes, 460votes, 369votes and 211 votes respectively of the total valid votes cast. These were equivalent to 43.3%, 2.7%, 1.4%, 1.1%, 0.9% and 0.5% respectively of the total valid votes cast.1 Asiedu-Mensah was elected on the ticket of the New Patriotic Party. His constituency was a part of 14 parliamentary seats out of a total 21 seats won by the New Patriotic Party in that elections in the Brong Ahafo Region of Ghana. In all, the New Patriotic Party won a majority total of 100 parliamentary representation out of 200 parliamentary seats in the 3rd parliament of the 4th republic of Ghana.

=== 2004 Elections ===
Asiedu-Mensah was re-elected as the member of parliament for the Dormaa West constituency for the 2004 Ghanaian general elections. He thus represented the constituency in the 4th parliament of the 4th republic of Ghana. Asiedu-Mensah was elected with 23,764 votes out of 47,412 total valid votes cast. This was equivalent to 50.1% of total valid votes cast. He was elected over Oppong Asamoah Vincent of the National Democratic Congress and Kwadwo Agyei-Dwomor of the Democratic People's Party. These obtained 22,601 votes and 1,047 votes respectively of the total valid votes cast. 4.5 This were equivalent to 47.7% and 2.2% of the total valid votes cast. Asiedu-Mensah was elected on the ticket of the New Patriotic Party. His constituency was a part of 14 parliamentary seats out of a total 24 seats won by the New Patriotic Party in the Brong Ahafo region of Ghana in that elections. In all, the New Patriotic Party won a majority total of 114 parliamentary representation out of a total 230 seats in the 4th parliament of the 4th republic of Ghana.

== Personal life ==
Asiedu-Mensah is a Christian.
