= Vincent Oppong Asamoah =

Ghanaian politician

Hon. Vincent Oppong Asamoah MP
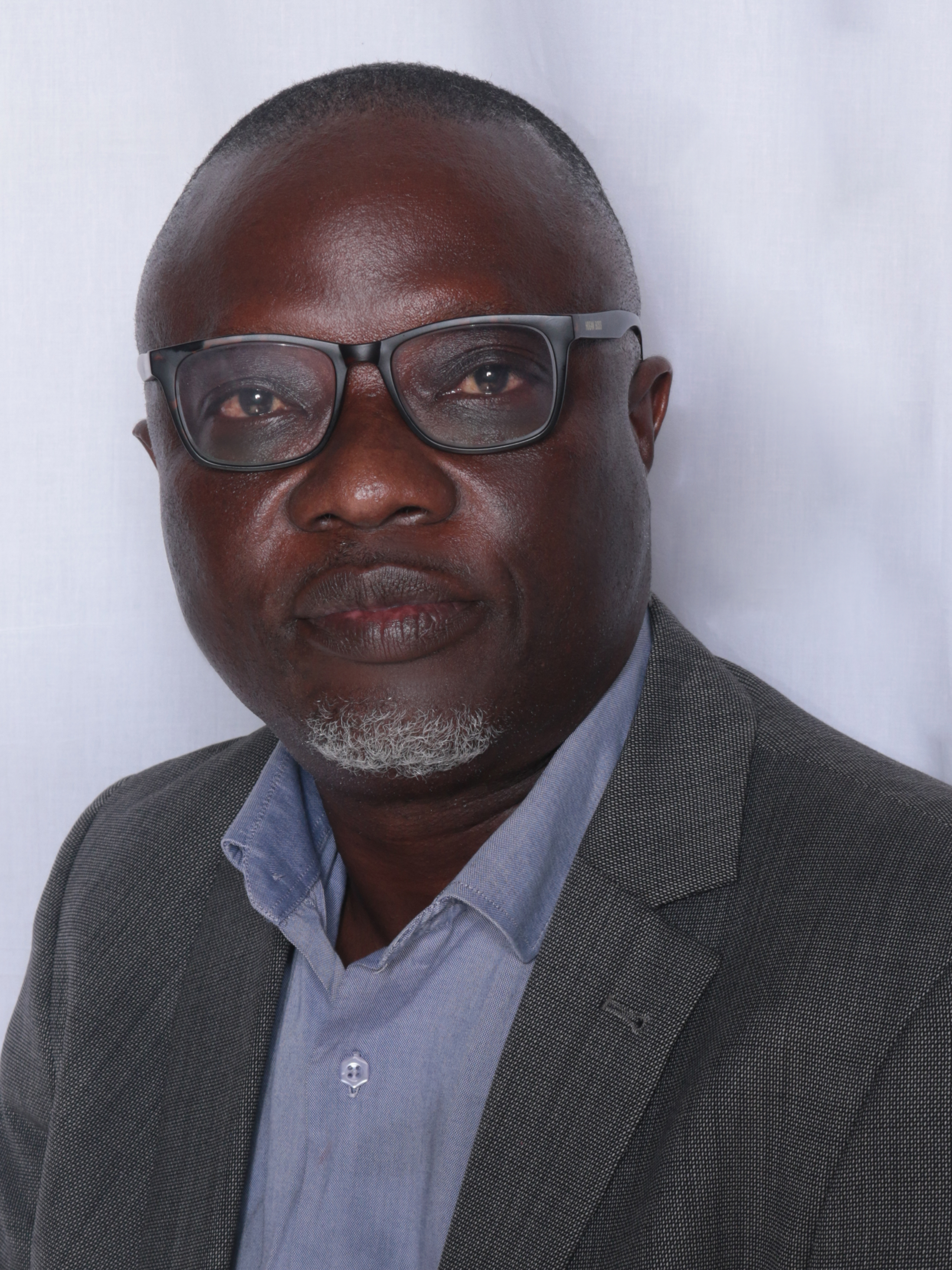

Member of Parliament for Dormaa West Constituency
- Incumbent
- Assumed office 7 January 2021

Personal details
- Born: Vincent Oppong Asamoah; 13 January 1966 (age 60) Nsoatre, Ghana
- Party: National Democratic Congress
- Occupation: Politician
- Profession: Municipal Chief Executive
- Committees: Works and Housing Committee (Ranking Member); Poverty Reduction Strategy Committee

Vincent Oppong Asamoah (born January 13, 1966) is a Ghanaian politician and member of the Eight Parliament of the Fourth Republic of Ghana. He represented the Dormaa West Constituency in the Brong-Ahafo Region on the ticket of the National Democratic Congress. He is the Former Deputy Minister for Youth and Sports of Ghana.

== Personal life ==
Asamoah is a Christian (Catholic). He is married with three children.

== Politics ==
Asamoah is a member of the National Democratic Congress (NDC). In 2012, he contested for the Dormaa West seat on the ticket of the NDC sixth parliament of the fourth republic and won.

=== Committees ===
Asamoah is the Ranking Member of the Works and Housing Committee and also a member of the Poverty Reduction Strategy Committee.

== Early life and education ==
Asamoah was born on January 13, 1966. He hails from Nsoatre in the Bono Region in Ghana. He also holds an MBA in Public Administration from Kwame Nkrumah University of Science and Technology, and a BA from the University of Cape Coast.

== Career ==
Asamoah was a social worker before running for political office in 2012. He worked at OLAM Ghana limited in the Asawinso in the Western Region. He was appointed the Municipal Chief Executive for the Dormaa Municipality from 29 April 2009, until he was sworn in as an MP in the Sixth Parliament of the Fourth Republic of Ghana on 7 January 2013.
