= Ferrocarril =

Ferrocarril is Spanish for "railway". It may refer to:

== Sports clubs ==
Clubs often founded by railway workers:

- Deportivo Ferrocarril, Zarumilla, Tumbes, Peru
- Club Ferrocarril Mitre, in Miguelete, San Martín Partido, Greater Buenos Aires, Argentina
- Club Ferrocarril Midland, in Merlo Partido, Greater Buenos Aires, Argentina
- Club Ferrocarril Urquiza, former name of UAI Urquiza, in Villa Lynch, General San Martín Partido, Greater Buenos Aires, Argentina
- Ferrocarril, Nicaraguan football champions of 1946 and 1948
- Ferrocarril, 1940s ancestor of Sonsonate FC in Sonsonate, El Salvador

== Other ==
- El Ferrocarril, liberal Chilean newspaper published 1855–1911
- Ferrocarril metro station, on the Santiago Metro, in Santiago, Chile

== See also ==
- Rail transport by country, a list which includes Spanish-speaking countries
- [plural "railways"]
