= Solomon Anso Manson =

Ghanaian politician and researcher

Hon. Samuel Anso Manson

Member of the Ghana Parliament for Dormaa
- In office 1969–1972
- President: Edward Akufo-Addo
- Prime Minister: Kofi Abrefa Busia

Personal details
- Born: 26 December 1936.
- Education: University of Heidelberg
- Occupation: Politician
- Profession: Research Fellow

Samuel Anso Manson is a Ghanaian politician and was a member of the first parliament of the second Republic of Ghana. He represented the Dormaa constituency under the membership of the Progress Party (PP)

== Early life and education ==
Manson was born on 26 December 1936. He attended the University of Heidelberg where he obtained a Doctor of Philosophy in Research Fellow. He later worked as a Research Fellow before going to serve at the Parliament of Ghana.

== Politics ==
Manson began his political career in 1969 when he became the parliamentary candidate for the Progress Party (PP) to represent his constituency in the Parliament of Ghana prior to the commencement of the 1969 Ghanaian parliamentary election.

He was sworn into the First Parliament of the Second Republic of Ghana on 1 October 1969 after being pronounced winner at the 1969 Ghanaian election held on 26 August 1969 and his tenure of office ended on 13 January 1972.

== Personal life ==
He is not committed to any religion or faith.
