= Emmanuel Osei Baffour =

Ghanaian footballer

Emmanuel Osei
Personal information
- Full name: Emmanuel Osei Baffour
- Date of birth: 4 June 1994 (age 32)
- Place of birth: Obuasi, Ghana
- Height: 1.65 m (5 ft 5 in)
- Position: Midfielder

Team information
- Current team: Ashanti Gold
- Number: 24

Senior career*
Years	Team	Apps	(Gls)
2012–2013	Asokwa Deportivo		
2013–2017	Ashanti Gold		
2017–2019	Karela United		
2019–	Ashanti Gold		

International career^{‡}
2015	Ghana	1	(0)
- * Club domestic league appearances and goals as of 1 August 2020 ‡ National team caps and goals as of 1 August 2020

Emmanuel Osei Baffour (born 4 June 1994) is a Ghanaian football midfielder who plays for Ashanti Gold.
