= Bomaa =

- Location of Bomaa in Ghana
- Coordinates: 7°04′N 2°10′W
- Country: Ghana
- Region: Ahafo Region

Area
  - Total: 2.81 km^{2} (1.08 sq mi)

Population
  - Estimate (2020): 7,000
- Time zone: GMT
  - Summer (DST): GMT

Bomaa is a town in the Ahafo Region of Ghana. The town is known for the Bomaa Senior High School. The school is a second cycle institution.
