= Paa Kwesi Fabin =

Ghanaian football manager (born 1959)

Personal information
- Full name: Samuel Paa Kwesi Fabin
- Date of birth: 25 March 1959 (age 67)
- Place of birth: Tarkwa, Ghana

Team information
- Current team: Aduana Stars (manager)

Managerial career
- Years: Team
- 2002–2005: Asante Kotoko (assistant)
- 2005–2007: Berekum Arsenal
- 2007–2009: Heart of Lions
- 2009–2010: Asante Kotoko
- 2010–2011: Hearts of Oak
- 2011: Wassaman United
- 2011–2012: Heart of Lions
- 2011–2017: Ghana U17
- 2014–2015: Inter Allies
- 2018: Asante Kotoko
- 2019: Uganda U17 and U20
- 2019: Inter Allies
- 2019–2020: Ghana U23
- 2020–2021: Aduana Stars
- 2021–2022: Ghana U17
- 2022–2024: Aduana Stars

Samuel Paa Kwesi Fabin (born 25 March 1959) is a Ghanaian professional football manager who currently manages the Ghana national U-23 team. He previously managed Ghana Premier League teams like Asante Kotoko, Accra Hearts of Oak and Aduana Stars. He previously coached the Ghana national U-17 team leading them to 2nd place in the 2017 Africa U-17 Cup of Nations.

== Early life and education ==
Fabin is a native of Elmina in the Central Region but was born in Tarkwa in the Western region and grew up in Kumasi, Ashanti Region. He attended Winneba Specialist Training College where he completed as a trained teacher with a diploma in physical education and sports in 1987. Prior to that he had his secondary school education from Ebenezer Secondary School in Accra. He developed the love for coaching after his encounter with veteran Ghanaian coaches coach Sam Arday, Cecil Jones Attuquayefio, Jim Amoah and Oko Aryee whilst studying in Winneba. After completing his teacher training education he went to teach at the Obuasi Secondary Technical School whilst serving also as the head coach for the school's sports and football teams. He led the school to win the Ashanti School football Competition, making them the first school outside Kumasi to have clinched the title. He later went to the University of Cape Coast to further his education and knowledge in sports. He completed the university with a degree in health physical education recreation, management and psychology in 1997.

== Coaching career ==
=== Early career ===
After completing the university Fabin was posted to Osei Kyeretwie Secondary School (OKESS) where he served also as a physical education teacher and the head coach for the school's sports and football teams. Whilst at the school he nurtured future Ghanaian international footballer like Sulley Muntari, John Mensah, Kwadwo Poku, Stephen Oduro, Lawrence Kianya and William Thompson. He led the team to a successive 6 times Inter-Schools Milo Competition titles from 1998 to 2004. His success at OKESS attracted Asante Kotoko to appoint him as coach of their youth team in 1999. He served in that capacity till 2002 nurturing footballers like Francis Akwafo, Alex Asamoah, Osei Kwadwo and Eric Nii Baah.

==== Assistant coach (Asante Kotoko) ====
Fabin was promoted to the role of assistant coach to Ernst Middendorp in 2002. Under Middendorp, Fabin won the Ghanaian Premier League in 2003. Middendorp was replaced by Hans Dieter-Schmidt but Fabin was maintained in the assistant coach role. Under Hans Dieter-Schmidt, he also won the Ghanaian Premier League in 2005, and helped Kotoko to place 2nd in the 2004 CAF Confederation Cup after losing to their arch rivals Accra Hearts of Oak. He left Asante Kotoko in 2005.

=== Berekum Arsenal ===
Fabin was signed his first professional coaching deal in 2005 and was appointed as head coach of Berekum Arsenal. He is credited by Ghanaian international footballer Emmanuel Agyeman-Badu as the coach who engineered his move to the Berekum-based club and nurtured him during his youthful days as a footballer. He qualified the team to the 2006 CAF Confederation Cup but were eliminated in the second round by Petro de Luanda of Angola. He coached the club until 2007.

=== Kpando Heart of Lions ===
Fabin moved from Berekum Arsenal to Kpando Heart of Lions in 2007, He led the team to win the MTN Top 4 championship and the SWAG Cup both in 2009. He was later voted Ghana Premier League 2009 coach of the year. Within the two years he coached them, the team finished in the Top 4 of the Ghana premier league. They finished in 2nd place in the 2007–2008 season and 3rd in the 2008–2009 season with Hearts of Oak winning the league in both seasons. He helped the team to qualify to the 2009-2010 CAF Confederation Cup but were eliminated.

=== Asante Kotoko ===
After his exploits at Kpando Hearts of Lions, Fabin was signed by his old club Asante Kotoko as head coach in September 2009. After a bad run of performances, Fabin was sacked in April 2010 with six matches to the end of the 2009–2010 season leaving at the point when the team was 10th on the league table.

=== Accra Hearts of Oak ===
After losing his job at arch rivals Asante Kotoko, Fabin signed for Accra Hearts of Oak in June 2010 and led the club to win the MTN GHALCA Top 4 championship in 2010. Fabin left the club by mutual agreement in January 2011 after a run of poor performances, making it worse when they lost to Real Tamale United in the opening day of the second round of fixtures in a home match at Ohene Djan Sports Stadium, making it the first time in 33 years Real Tamale United had won a match against Hearts at that stadium. There were calls by supporters that he should sacked even before he left the club.

=== Wassaman United ===
Fabin signed for Ghana Division One side Wassaman United in March 2011 after unsuccessful seasons with both Asante Kotoko and Accra Hearts of Oak. Fabin guided the team to qualify into the Ghana Premier League for the first time in their history. After helping Wassaman into the Premier League, Fabin made statements on radio that both Kotoko and Hearts do not give their coaches enough time to help them build a title winning side. He was however relieved of his duty before the new season started and replaced with Herbert Addo.

=== Return to Kpando Heart of Lions ===
In September 2011, Kpando Heart of Lions announced that Fabin has assumed the role of head coach on a temporary basis with the hope of securing the Ghana national under-17 football team, the Black starlets head coach role which he had applied for. He replaced Dutch coach Hans van der Pluijm who had been coaching the team but quit his job just a few days into the league. He subsequently was appointed head coach of the Ghana U-17 team and was replaced by Ken August before the start of the second round of the season in January 2012.

=== Ghana U-17 (Black Starlets) ===
Fabin served as the Ghana national U-17 team head coach from 2011 to 2017, within that 6-year tenure he led the Black starlets to two Africa U-17 Cup of Nations in 2013 and 2017 out of three Cup of Nations played, whilst in the 2015 Championship, Ghana was disqualified for fielding ineligible over age players. Under his tenure Ghana qualified for one FIFA U-17 World Cup in 2017 out of the three FIFA U-17 World Cup played. In the two Africa U-17 Cup of Nations that Ghana took part in, he led the team to the competition but were eliminated in group stage in 2013 and placed 2nd in 2017.

==== 2017 Africa U-17 Cup of Nations ====
Fabin led the Ghana U-17 team in the 2017 Africa U-17 Cup of Nations after being disqualified in the 2015 qualifying round. The Black Starlets topped their group with 7 points after 2 wins and one draw to make it to the semi-finals where they beat Niger U-17 team in a penalty shootout to push them into the final for the time in 12 years. The team lost 1–0 in the final and placed 2nd to the Mali U-17 team. Placing amongst the top 4 teams meant that Ghana had qualified for the U-17 World Cup, first time in 10 years, after not qualifying for 4 successive World Cups.

==== 2017 FIFA U-17 World Cup ====
The Black Starlets qualified to the 2017 U-17 World Cup hosted by India. The team made an immediate impact by beating Columbia 1–0 in their opening match. They subsequently lost 1–0 to United States and won emphatically 4–0 against the host nation India to qualify to the Round of 16 where they beat their African counterparts Niger by 2–0 to move to the Quarter final stage, which his side lost 2-0 and were eliminated from the competition by their other African counterparts Mali who had also beaten them in the 2017 African U-17 finals. Within Fabin's squad were players like current Ajax midfielder Mohammed Kudus, Emmanuel Toku and Asante Kotoko goalkeeper Ibrahim Danlad. After the World Cup his contract ended and he was replaced with Abdul-Karim Zito in 2018.

=== Inter Allies ===
Whilst serving as Ghana U-17 head coach, Fabin was appointed by International Allies F.C. as Head Coach and Director of Education for their Football School in 2014. He coached the team for the 2014–2015 season leading the team to the 6th position in the League but was relieved of his duties by mutual consent in 2015.

=== Return to Asante Kotoko ===
On 25 February 2018, Asante Kotoko in a statement announced that they had signed a one-year contract with Fabin and appointed him as the new head coach of the club replacing English coach Steven Polack who had been sacked by the club following the club's elimination from the 2018 CAF Confederation Cup at the first preliminary round stage by CARA Brazzaville. Fabin led the club to 4th position in the first round of matches in the 2018 Ghana Premier League but resigned from his role as head coach on 13 September 2018, stating personal reasons and deemed it the right time to exit the club since the league had been suspended following the Number 12 Anas video scandal.

=== Uganda U-17 and U-20 ===
In March 2019, the Federation of Uganda Football Associations (FUFA) confirmed on their official website that they had appointed Fabin as the head coach for their national U-17 and U-20 teams for a period of one year. He coached their U-17 team to the 2019 Africa U-17 Cup of Nations but were eliminated in the group stage. After 2 months, FUFA confirmed on their official website that they had mutually ended their contract with Fabin in May 2019.

=== Return to Inter Allies ===
After leaving his head coach role with the Uganda youth teams, Fabin signed for his former club, International Allies F.C. ahead of the 2019–2020 season in August 2019. Fabin ended his second spell with the club after just two months even before the 2019–2020 season started in November 2019.

=== Ghana U-23 (Black Meteors) ===
In January 2020, in the Ghana Football Association's rebuilding agenda, Fabin was appointed as the coach of the Ghana U-23 national team after previously serving as coach of the U-17 from 2011 to 2017. He replaced Ibrahim Tanko whose team narrowly missed out on qualifying for the 2020 Tokyo Olympic Games after finishing fourth in the Africa U-23 Cup of Nations held in Egypt in November 2019.

=== Aduana Stars ===
On 28 February 2020, Fabin was appointed by Dormaa-based club Aduana Stars as their new head coach, in the middle of the 2019–2020 season. At the time he took charge, the team was in second place. He helped move the team to first place before the league was put on hold abruptly due to the COVID-19 pandemic. The league was later suspended and subsequently cancelled with no team winning the title. Fabin remained in his role as head coach ahead of the 2020–2021 season, however in February 2021, he left the club after his contract expired and was replaced by Asare Bediako.

== Honours ==
=== Manager ===
Kpando Heart of Lions

- GHALCA Top 4 Championship: 2009
- SWAG Cup: 2009

Accra Hearts of Oak

- GHALCA Top 4 Championship: 2010

Ghana U-17

- Africa U-17 Cup of Nations runner-up: 2017
- WAFU U-17 Cup of Nations third place: 2022

Individual

- Ghana Premier League Coach of The Year: 2009
- Ghana Premier League Coach of the Month: June 2015, February 2023, April 2023

== See also ==
- Ghana national U-17 team
- Kpando Hearts of Lions
- Ghana Premier League
