= Dormaa East District =

District in Bono Region, Ghana

- District
- Districts of Bono Region

- Location of Dormaa East District within Bono Region
- Coordinates: 7°18′N 2°42′W
- Country: Ghana
- Region: Bono Region
- Capital: Wamfie

Government
  - District Executive: Hon. I.K. Kyeremeh

Population (2021)
  - Total: 67,899
- Time zone: UTC+0 (GMT)

Dormaa East District is one of the twelve districts in Bono Region, Ghana. Originally it was formerly part of the then-larger Dormaa District on 10 March 1989; until the eastern part of the district was split off to create Dormaa East District on 29 February 2008; thus the remaining part has been retained as Dormaa District (which it was later elevated to municipal district assembly status and has been renamed as Dormaa Central Municipal District on 28 June 2012). The district assembly is located in the western part of Bono Region and has Wamfie as its capital town.

== List of settlements ==
Settlements of Dormaa East District
No.	Settlement	Population	Population year
1	Akontanim		
2	Akotanimfou		
3	Akotokrom		
4	Akuraa		
5	Amanfe		
6	Aponponoso		
7	Asunsu No. 1 and 2		
8	Asuotiano		
9	Attakrom		
10	Bofetire		
11	Danyame		
12	Dormaa Akwamu		
13	Fosukrom		
14	Hiamadwene		
15	Kwabena Twumkron		
16	Kwasi Addaikrom		
17	Kyeremasu		
18	Mmomesomuo		
19	Nseseresu		
20	Praprababida		
21	Subinkron		
22	Tumtumkrom		
23	Twepeasea		
24	Wamanafo		
25	Wamfie		

== Sources ==
- "Dormaa East District". Statoids.
- District: Dormaa East District
