= Dormaa Ahenkro =

Town & District Capital in Bono Region, Ghana

Dormaa Ahenkro Dormaa
- Town & District Capital
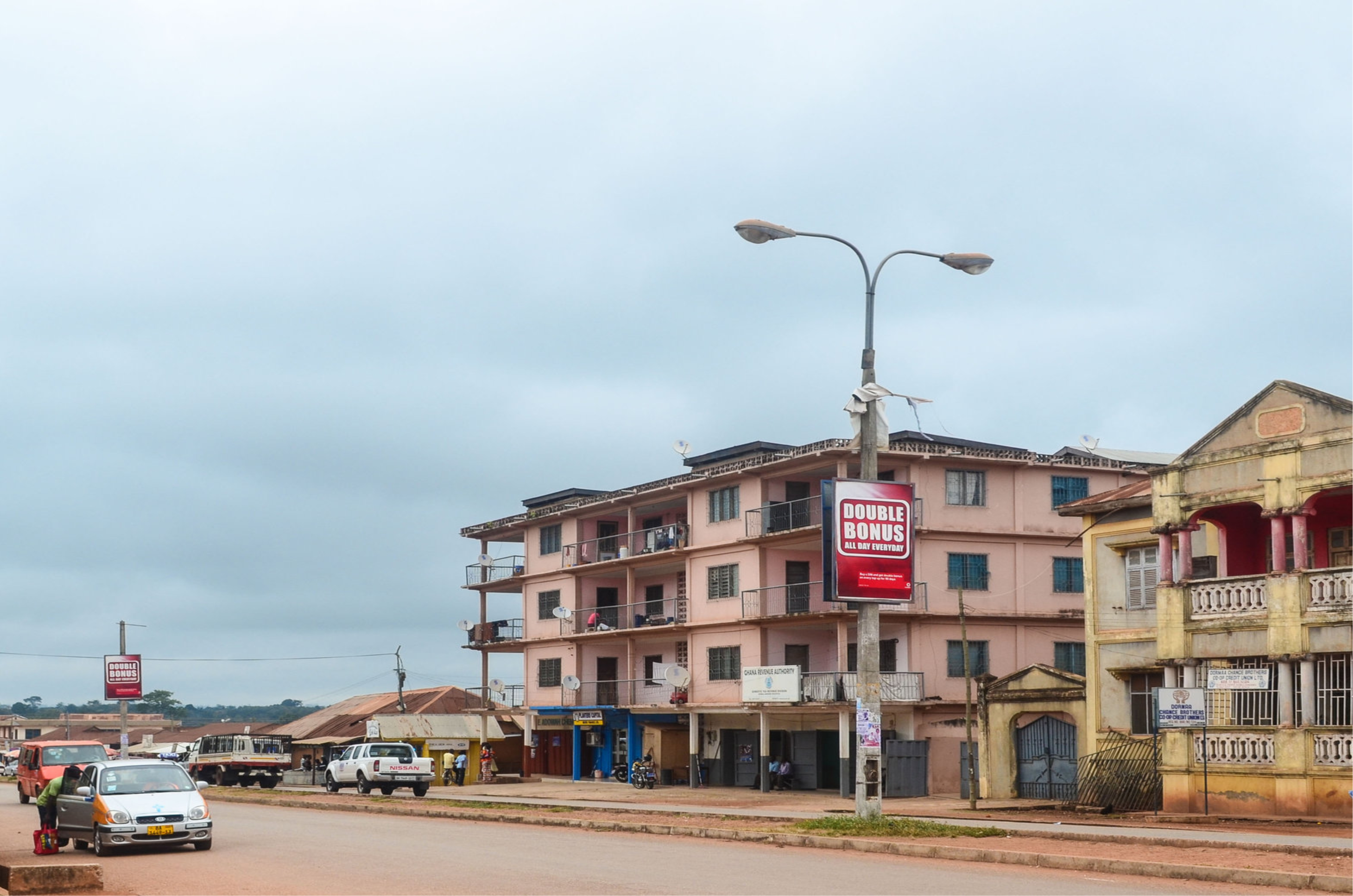
- View of a high street in Dormaa Ahenkro

- Dormaa Municipal logo

- Location of Dormaa Ahenkro in Bono
- Coordinates: 7°17′N 2°53′W
- Country: Ghana
- Region: Bono
- District: Dormaa Municipal
- Elevation: 258 m (846 ft)

Population (2020)
  - Total: 112,111
- Time zone: GMT
  - Summer (DST): GMT

Dormaa Ahenkro is a town and also the capital of Dormaa Traditional Area Dormaa Municipal of the Bono Region, in Ghana. Dormaa Ahenkro has a historical reference for their brave warlords. Dormaa Ahenkro is the capital for the Dormaa traditional area and serves as the seat of the King Oseadeeyo Nana Agyeman Badu II.

Dorma currently is divided into three Districts; Dormaa Municipal Dormaa Ahenkro as its capital, Dormaa West District Nkrankwanta as its capital and Dormaa East District Wamfie as its capital.

== Geography ==
=== Location ===
The municipality is situated at the western part of the Bono Region. It is bound in the North by the Jaman South district and in the east by the Dormaa East district, in the south and south-east by Asunafo and Asutifi districts respectively, in the west and south-west by Dormaa West and in the west and north-west by Ivory Coast. It is the municipal capital and is located about 80 kilometers west of the regional capital, Sunyani and also about 46.3 kilometers from Berekum.

== Healthcare ==
A district Hospital "Dormaa Presbyterian Hospital" founded in 1955 is located in Dormaa Ahenkro.

== Education ==
The main senior high school in the area is Dormaa Senior High School. There is a technical training center known as Dormaa Vocational Training Institute. The University of Energy and Natural Resources (Dormaa campus) and Presbyterian Midwifery and Nursing Center are also located within Dormaa Ahenkro.

== Stadiums and sports ==
=== Sports ===
Professional sports teams based in Dormaa Ahenkro include:

- Aduana Football Club
