= Joseph Addo (footballer, born 1990) =

Ghanaian footballer

Personal information
- Full name: Joseph Addo
- Date of birth: November 2, 1990 (age 35)
- Place of birth: Buduburam, Ghana
- Height: 1.81 m (5 ft 11 in)
- Position: Goalkeeper

Team information
- Current team: Aduana Stars
- Number: 16

Youth career
- –2005: Sekondi Hasaacas

Senior career*
Years	Team	Apps	(Gls)
2006–2011	Sekondi Hasaacas		
2011–	Heart of Lions		

International career
2007	Ghana U-17		
2008–2009	Ghana U-20		
- * Club domestic league appearances and goals as of 23 August 2008

Joseph Addo (born November 2, 1990, in Ghana) is a Ghanaian footballer currently playing for Ghanaian club Aduana Stars in the Ghana Premier League, as a goalkeeper.

== Career ==
Addo began his career on youth team of Sekondi Hasaacas F.C. and was promoted to the club's senior Glo Premier League team in January 2006. After his return from the 2009 FIFA U-20 World Cup he became the starting goalie for his club Sekondi Hasaacas. Addo left the club following its relegation to the Poly Tank Division One League and from the 2010–11 Glo Premier League season and joined Glo Premier League club and joined Heart of Lions in start for the 2011–12 Glo Premier League season.

== International career ==
Addo was member for Ghana national under-17 football team in 2007 FIFA U-17 World Cup in South Korea and played 7 games. He was the first choice goalkeeper for the under 17 tournament in Korea 2007 where Ghana placed third in the championship. On 19 August 2008 was called for the Satellites and with the team won the 2009 FIFA U-20 World Cup in Egypt where he was taken the second choice goalkeeper.

He was called up to the senior Ghana squad for a World Cup qualifier against Egypt in October 2017.

== Titles and honours ==
=== International ===
Ghana U-20

- FIFA U-20 World Cup Champion: 2009
