= Herbert Addo =

Ghanaian football manager

Herbert Addo (24 June 1951 – 24 March 2017) was a Ghanaian Premier League football coach. He was born in Accra. He coached Hasaacas, Asante Kotoko, Ashanti Gold, Hearts of Oak, Aduana Stars and Inter Allies. He also coached Gabonese club Shellsport now Mbilinga.

== Honours ==
Hasaacas

- WAFU Cup: 1981–82, runners-up: 1982–83
- SWAG Cup: 1982–83, 1983–84

Kumasi Cornerstone

- WAFU Club Championship: 1987

Shellsport

- Coupe du Gabon Interclubs: 1989–90

Ashanti Gold

- Ghana Premier League: 1994–95, 1995–96
- SWAG Cup: 1994, 1995
- CAF Champions League runners-up: 1997

Aduana Stars

- Ghana Premier League: 2010

Accra Hearts of Oak

- Ghana Premier League: 2002
- President's Cup: 2003, 2015

Inter Allies

- Ghanaian FA Cup runners-up: 2014

Ghana

- West African Nations Cup [SCSA Zone III]: 1983, 1986, 1987

Ghana A'

- WAFU Nations Cup third place: 2010
