= Wamfie =

Place in Bono Region, Ghana

Coordinates: 7°18′N 2°42′W

- Town
- Location of Wamfie in Bono
- Country: Ghana
- Region: Bono
- Time zone: GMT
  - Summer (DST): GMT

Wamfie is a town located in the Bono Region of Ghana. It is the capital of Dormaa East District. The town is known for the Mansen Commercial Day Senior High School. The school is a second cycle institution. It is located at an elevation of 289 meters above sea level and its population amounts to 41,345. Its coordinates are 7°18'0" N and 2°42'0" W.

Nana Kwasi Ansu is the former chief of Wamfie.
