= Aduana =

One of the seven major Akan clans

Aduana is one of the Eight major Akan clans of Ghana. It is also the second largest clan in terms of population.

The totem of the Aduana clan is a dog, sometimes a Frog and Snake. According to legend, a dog led the clan during their migration process to their first settlement Kumkumso forest in Hemang, lighting the path with fire in its mouth. It is also believed that this fire is still at the palace of the clan's major town.
