= Yahaya Mohammed =

Ghanaian footballer

Yahaya Mohamed
Personal information
- Full name: Mohammed Yahaya Sabato
- Date of birth: 17 February 1988 (age 38)
- Place of birth: Accra, Greater Accra, Ghana
- Height: 1.89 m (6 ft 2 in)
- Positions: Center forward; striker

Team information
- Current team: Aduana Stars
- Number: 11

Youth career
- Tema Youth

Senior career*
Years	Team	Apps	(Gls)
2006–2008	Tema Youth	7	(11)
2007–2008	→ OGC Nice (loan)	0	(0)
2008–2011	Real Tamale United	0	(0)
2009–2010	→ Wa All Stars (loan)	0	(0)
2011–2015	Asante Kotoko	4	(0)
2012–2013	→ Amidaus (loan)	15	(8)
2015–2016	Aduana Stars	16	(11)
2016-2017	Murciélagos	0	(0)
2017-2018	Azam FC	14	(7)
2018-2019	Aduana Stars	11	(8)
2019-2020	Aduana Stars	15	(11)

International career^{‡}
2007	Ghana U-20	3	(0)
2014–	Ghana	5	(1)
Medal record
Professionalism in association football
Aduana Stars
Winner	Ghana Premier League	2012
Winner	Ghana Super Cup	2012
Winner	Ghana Premier League	2013
Runner-up	Ghanaian FA Cup	2013
Winner	Ghana Super Cup	2013
Winner	Ghana Super Cup	2018/2019 season
- * Club domestic league appearances and goals as of 19 July 2018 ‡ National team caps and goals as of 29 March 2021

Mohammed Yahaya Sabato (born 17 February 1988) is a professional footballer who currently plays for Aduana Stars.

== Career ==
The 2007 Toulon Tournament had an international audience. Yahaya was noted for his play during the tournament. Shortly after the tournament, he was enrolled and had a successful trial period, with OGC Nice in Ligue 1 and was offered a three-year contract to June 2010 by the Stade Municipal du Ray outfit. On 1 July 2011, Mohammed Yahaya returned to Asante Kotoko to coach young and promising players and well as foster goodwill in young and coming players in the Ghana Premier League. Up until now, his countenance in football serves as an inspiration to many in the league. On 3 April 2019, Yahaya along with Fatawu Abdulrahman scored a goal each to help Aduana to a 2–1 victory over Eleven Wonders.

== International career ==
A resourceful striker, Yahaya was a crucial player in Ghana's U20 team that participated in the 2007 Toulon Tournament in France. After playing well in his short stint with the Black Satellites, on 7 August 2007, Yahaya was called up by Claude Le Roy for a FIFA International friendly match against Senegal in the New Den Stadium in London, England on 21 August 2007. His work and perseverance awarded him an opportunity yet again in Ghana's national squad that competed at the 2011 African Nations Championship.

== Career statistics ==
As of matches played on 15 December 2019.

Club	Season	Division	League		Cup^{1}		Continental^{2}		Other^{3}		Total		
Club	Season	Division	Apps	Goals	Apps	Goals	Apps	Goals	Apps	Goals	Apps	Goals	Assists
Azam FC	2017–18	Ghana Premier League	14	7	0	0	0	0	0	0	0	14	13
Aduana Stars	2018–19	Ghana Premier League	11	8	0	0	0	0	0	0		11	9
Aduana Stars	2019–20	Ghana Premier League	15	11	0	0	0	0	0	0		15	10
Career Total			40	26	0	0	0	0	0	0	19	26	32

^{1}Includes the Ghanaian FA Cup and the Ghana Super Cup.
^{2}African competitions include the CAF Champions League, CAF Confederations Cup and the CAF Super Cup.
^{3}Other tournaments include the FIFA Club World Cup.

== Honours ==
=== Club ===
Asante Kotoko

- Ghana Premier League: 2011–12, 2012–13
- Ghanaian FA Cup runner-up: 2012–13
- Ghana Super Cup: 2011–12, 2012–13
