= Aduana Football Club =

Association football club in Ghana

- Full name: Aduana Football Club
- Nicknames: Aduana Ogya; Ogya
- Founded: 3 March 1985; 41 years ago, as Aduana Stars
- Ground: Nana Agyemang Badu I Park; Dormaa Ahenkro, Bono Region
- Capacity: 10,000
- Coordinates: 7.26522222°N 2.86536111°W
- Chairman: Mr. Collins Atta Poku
- Manager: Aristică Cioabă
- League: Ghana Premier League
- 2025–26: Ghana Premier League, 5th of 18
Home colours	Away colours

Aduana Football Club (formerly Aduana ~~Stars~~ F.C) is a professional football club, based in Dormaa Ahenkro, Bono Region, Ghana. The club is competing in the Ghanaian Premier League. It made history by winning the Ghana Premier League at their first attempt with 53 points. It became the ninth club to win the Ghana Premier League in its 54-year-old history.

== History ==
=== Early years ===
In 1984, four natives of Dormaa Ahenkro, Bono Region led by Agya Donkor, a goldsmith and supported by Kofi Boahen, Iddrisa Issaka and one other unnamed person registered to play in the regional division 4 league of Ghana, bringing Aduana Football Club to birth in 1985. Due to the decision to adopt the official emblem of the Aduana clan, the group had to seek for the permission from the Aduanahene (who was a paramount chief of Aboabo no 3), which he accepted.

Aduana Football Club went on to play in the division 4 of the Ghana League for two years before gaining promotion to the Division 3 League in 1986. After that promotion, the club declined and didn't see much progress afterward.

=== Take over by Paramount chief or Omanhene of Dormaa Ahenkro ===
Due to financial issues and the retrogressing of the club, led to the decision of the Omanhene of Dormaa Osagyefo Oseadeeyo Dr. Nana Agyeman Badu II who was also a High Court Judge in Tema and became an Appeal Court judge as of August 2025, to take over the management of the club. Subsequent to his take over, the club played in the lower divisions for some years moving up the ladder and finally getting promoted to the Ghana Premier League on 19 August 2009 for the first time in their history, after Richard Addai scored the winning goal in their last fixture against Universal Stars to help them to a 2–1 victory at the Baba Yara Sports Stadium.

=== 2009–2019 ===
Within this period Aduana Football Club won the Ghana Premier League title two times, once in 2010 and once in 2017. They also won the Ghana Super Cup in 2018 and competed in the CAF Champions League as champions of Ghana on two occasions, in 2011 and 2018.

==== 2010 (League triumph) ====
Aduana's first Ghana Premier League goal was scored by Richard Addai. On 17 October 2009, Aduana Football Club won their first top flight in a match against Heart of Lions at the Agyeman Badu I Park in Dormaa through Richard Addae's 73rd-minute strike.

They first won the title in 2009–10 when the team ended the season as the fewest-scoring side in the League, setting a world record for least productive champions with 19 goals in 30 matches. With an average of 0.6333 goals per match, they broke the record set by Trabzonspor. The Turkish Süper Lig side became champions in 1979–80 with 25 goals in 30 matches (average of 0.8333).

In a league of 16 clubs that generated 30 matches, Aduana Football Club won 15 matches, drew 8, and lost 7 beating Obuase Ashanti Gold S.C to the title by the head-to-head margin which had been adopted by the Ghana premier league board (PLB) in case of a tie, after both clubs garnered 53 points from all the 30 matches played at the end of the season.

They were led by Ghanaian coach Herbert Addo, who helped them set the record of being the first newly promoted team to win the league. They also became the first team either than Kumasi-based Asante Kotoko S.C. or Accra based team Accra Hearts of Oak S.C. to win the league within the 21st Century and the 9th team to win the Ghana Premier League since its inception 54 years ago in 1956.

==== 2017–2018 (League triumph & FA Super Cup) ====
The second triumph was 2017 after the team had finished as runners-up to Wa All stars in the previous year. They won the 2017/2018 Ghana Premier League after going undefeated in 15 home matches within the season with one game to spare after a 2–1 victory over Elmina Sharks at Nana Agyeman Badu Park at Dormaa-Ahenkro. The team was led by the late Ghanaian coach Yussif Abubakar who described their triumph at that time as a well hard fought league title victory. They completed the season with a 6-point gap between them and the second place team West African Football Academy (WAFA), with 16 wins, 9 draws and 6 loses. They were awarded $30,000 equivalent to Ghs 180,000 as prize money for winning the league The team later parted ways with Herbert Addo in August 2011

=== 2020–present ===
After several distractions to the Ghana Premier League from 2017 due to the dissolution of the GFA in June 2018, the 2018 league season was abandoned and the uprising of the deadly COVID-19 pandemic which also caused the 2019–20 league to be canceled abruptly. Aduana was leading the league before the cancellation with more than half of league matches played. The 2020–21 season started in November 2020. In February 2020, Ghanaian coach Paa Kwesi Fabin was signed as head coach who resigned midway through the season. In March 2021, the club appointed Joseph Asare Bediako a former coach of Berekum Chelsea to finish the season. The club finished the 2020–21 season 4th out of 18 clubs and amassed 54 points.

== Ownership of Aduana Football Club ==
Aduana Football Club is a traditional club led by the head of the Aduana clan and has a board that comprises chiefs from towns in the Bono region and other regions like Kumawu, Agogo, Tepa, Bomaa, Abesim, Chiraa, Akwamu etc. The lifetime board chairman of the club is the Dormaa hene who doubles as the Aduana Piesie "Head of the Aduana Akan Clan". The title "Aduana Piesie" has been under copious amount of debates, but several pages including Me Y3 Asante in their 2017 facebook post, acknowledged that Dormaa Hene or Dormaahene is the true Aduana Pieise aka. Aduana Clan's first born in Akan Tradition.

== Crest ==
Current Logo (Current)

Previous Logo (2014–2020)

Former logo

== Grounds ==
The club plays their home games at the Nana Agyeman Badu I Stadium in Dormaa Ahenkro in the Bono Region

== 2025–26 Season ==
The 2025–26 season is the club’s current campaign in the Ghana Premier League (GPL).

=== League table (snapshot) ===
Pos	Team	Pld	W	D	L	GF	GA	GD	Pts
1	Aduana	15	8	4	3	14	7	+7	28
2	Medeama	14	7	6	1	19	9	+10	27
3	Asante Kotoko	15	8	3	4	17	9	+8	27
4	Hearts of Oak	15	6	7	2	10	6	+4	25
5	Bibiani Gold Stars	14	7	4	3	14	16	−2	25
6	Samartex	15	7	3	5	14	12	+2	24
7	Heart of Lions	15	6	5	4	17	11	+6	23
8	Karela United	15	6	5	4	15	14	+1	23
9	Young Apostles	15	6	2	7	11	12	−1	20
10	Nations	15	5	4	6	11	12	−1	19
11	Swedru All Blacks	15	5	3	7	13	12	+1	18
12	Dreams	15	4	5	6	15	16	−1	17
13	Hohoe United	15	5	2	8	12	14	−2	17
14	Basake Holy Stars	15	4	5	6	11	16	−5	17
15	Bechem United	15	4	4	7	14	15	−1	16
16	Berekum Chelsea	15	4	3	8	7	15	−8	15
17	Vision F.C.	15	4	3	8	10	15	−5	15
18	Eleven Wonders	14	1	3	10	3	16	−13	6

Updated to match(es) played on 22 December 2025. Source: [www.ghanafa.org Premier League Standings – Ghana Football Association]

Note: Full league standings are available on the season article.

=== Fixtures & results ===
Date	Opponent	Home/Away	Venue	Competition	Result	Source
14 September 2025	Karela United	Away	Aliu Mahama Stadium	GPL	1–0 L	
21 September 2025	Nations FC	Home	Nana Agyemang Badu I Park	GPL	1–0 W	
27 September 2025	Swedru All Blacks	Home	Nana Agyemang Badu I Park	GPL	2–1 W	
6 October 2025	FC Samartex	Away	Samreboi	GPL	1–0 L	
8 October 2025	Dreams F.C.	Home	Nana Agyemang Badu I Park	GPL	1-0 W	
19 October 2025	Hohoe United	Away	Hohoe Sports Stadium	GPL	0–2 W	https://www.besoccer.com/match/hohoe-united-fc/aduana-stars/2026110052
25 October 2025	Medeama	Home	Nana Agyemang Badu I Park	GPL	0–0 D	
03 November 2025	Eleven Wonders	Away	University of Ghana Sports Stadium	GPL	0–1 W	https://www.besoccer.com/match/techiman-city/aduana-stars/2026110072
08 November 2025	Bechem United	Home	Nana Agyemang Badu I Park	GPL	2–1 W	
16 November 2025	Asante Kotoko	Away	Baba Yara Sports Stadium	GPL	1–1 D	https://www.sofascore.com/football/match/aduana-stars-fc-asante-kotoko-sc/fKqskcr#id:14489838
23 November 2025	Berekum Chelsea	Home	Nana Agyemang Badu I Park	GPL	3–1 W	https://www.sofascore.com/football/match/berekum-chelsea-aduana-stars-fc/kcrslcr
26 November 2025	Bechem United	Home	Nana Agyemang Badu I Park	FAC	2–1 W	
30 November 2025	Bibiani Gold Stars	Away	Dun's Park	GPL	1–0 L	https://www.sofascore.com/football/match/bibiani-gold-stars-fc-aduana-stars-fc/kcrsRyid
7 December 2025	Basake Holy Stars	Home	Nana Agyemang Badu I Park	GPL	0—0 D	
12 December 2025	Heart of Lions	Away	Kpando Sports Stadium	GPL	0—1 W	
21 December 2025	Hearts of Oak	Home	Nana Agyemang Badu I Park	GPL	0–0 D	
28 December 2025	Young Apostles	Away	TBD	GPL	–	
4 January 2026	Vision FC	Home	Nana Agyemang Badu I Park	GPL	–	
TBD	Karela United	Home	Nana Agyemang Badu I Park	GPL	–	
TBD	Nations FC	Away	Dr Kwame Kyei Sports Complex	GPL	–	
TBD	Swedru All Blacks	Away	Swedru Stadium	GPL	–	
TBD	FC Samartex	Home	Nana Agyemang Badu I Park	GPL	–	
TBD	Medeama S.C.	Away	TBD	GPL	–	
TBD	Hohoe United	Home	Nana Agyemang Badu I Park	GPL	–	
TBD	Dreams FC	Away	Dawu Sports Stadium	GPL	–	
TBD	Eleven Wonders	Home	Nana Agyemang Badu I Park	GPL	–	
TBD	Bechem United	Away	Nana Fosu Gyeabour Park	GPL	–	
TBD	Asante Kotoko	Home	Nana Agyemang Badu I Park	GPL	–	
TBD	Berekum Chelsea	Away	Golden City Park	GPL	–	
TBD	Bibiani Gold Stars	Home	Nana Agyemang Badu I Park	GPL	–	
TBD	Basake Holy Stars	Away	Sekondi-Takoradi Stadium	GPL	–	
TBD	Heart of Lions	Home	Nana Agyemang Badu I Park	GPL	–	
TBD	Hearts of Oak	Away	Accra Sports Stadium	GPL	–	
TBD	Young Apostles	Home	Nana Agyemang Badu I Park	GPL	–	
TBD	Vision FC	Away	TBD	GPL	–	

== Current squad ==
As of 10 September 2025

Note: Flags indicate national team as defined under FIFA eligibility rules; some limited exceptions apply. Players may hold more than one non-FIFA nationality.

No.	Pos.	Nation	Player
1	GK	GHA	Massawudu Inusah
21	DF	GHA	Remember Adomako
15	DF	GHA	Stephen Anokye Badu
17	DF	GHA	Adams Abubakar
6	MF	GHA	Silas Kyeremeh
7	MF	GHA	Sam Adams (Captain)
10	FW	GHA	Bright Adjei
9	FW	GHA	Emmanuel Marfo
19	FW	GHA	Mizack Afriyie
8	MF	GHA	Sana Seidu
13	FW	GHA	Elvis Addo
12	DF	GHA	Williams Denkyi
14	MF	GHA	Charles Gyamfi Kamara
16	GK	GHA	Gregory Obeng Sekyere
28	FW	GHA	Dominic Frimpong
30	DF	GHA	Desmond Obeng

No.	Pos.	Nation	Player
27	FW	BFA	Ben Daouda Sidibe
20	DF	GHA	Alex Boakye (Vice Captain)
29	MF	GHA	Samuel Owusu Ansah
22	GK	GHA	Mohammed Abass
32	FW	GHA	Kofi Asante
25	MF	GHA	Godfred Boakye
35	MF	GHA	Gideon Yeboah
11	FW	GHA	Henson Anponsa
18	DF	GHA	Patrick Mensah
41	GK	GHA	Prince Osei
23	DF	GHA	Stephen Kwakye
5	MF	GHA	Maxwell Arthur
31	FW	GHA	Henry Yeboah
34	MF	GHA	Obeng K. Adonteng
37	FW	GHA	Richard Afriyie
2	MF	GHA	Bismark Gyan
3	FW	GHA	Mohammed Bamba

== Kits ==
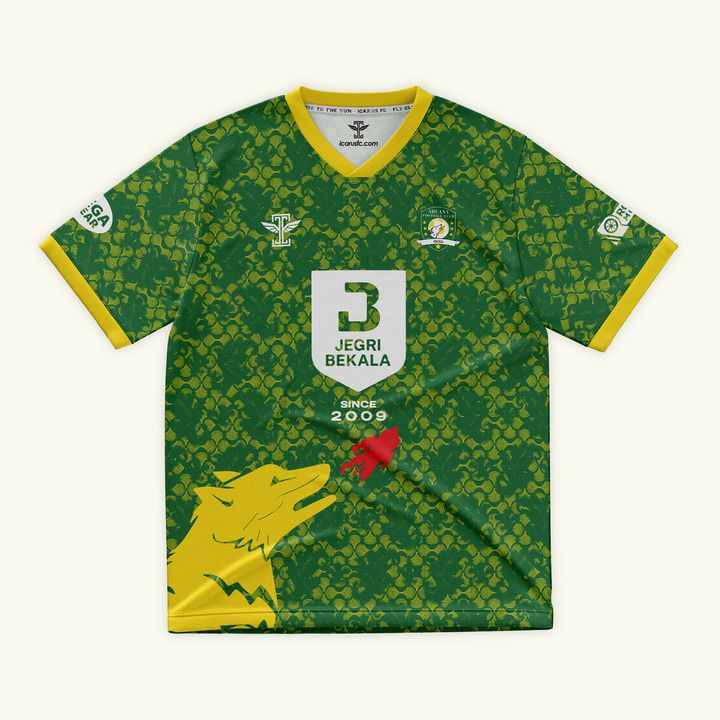
Aduana FC 2025-26 Home Shirt

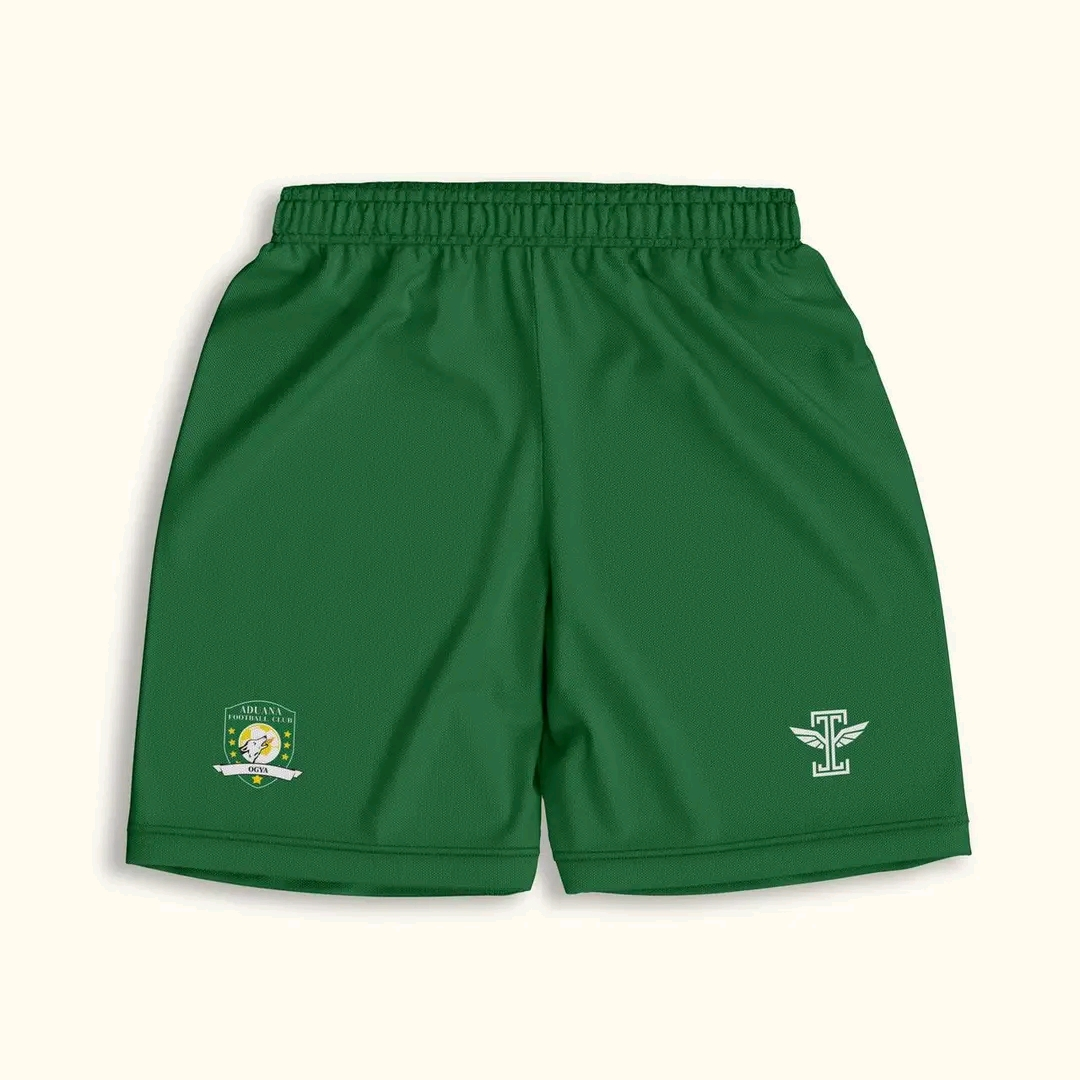
Aduana FC 2025-26 Home Shorts

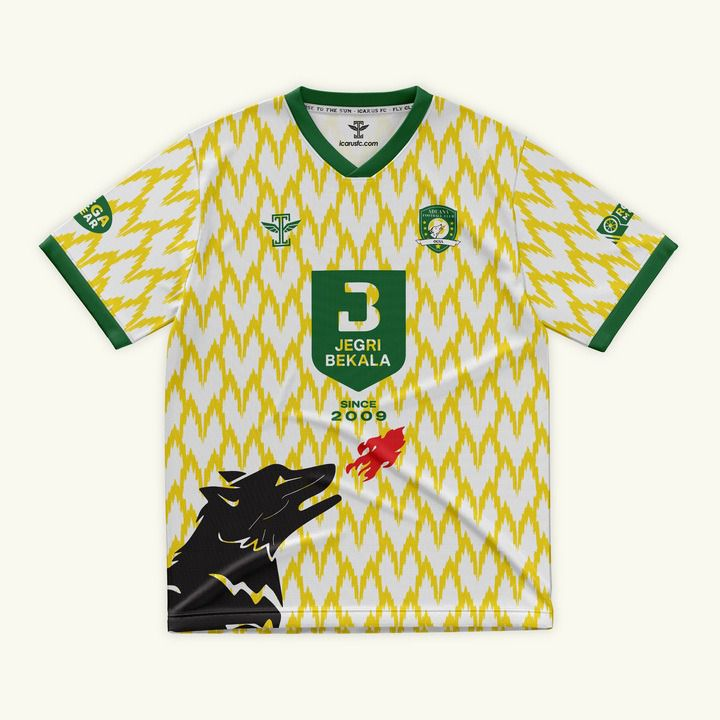
Aduana FC 2025-26 Away Shirt

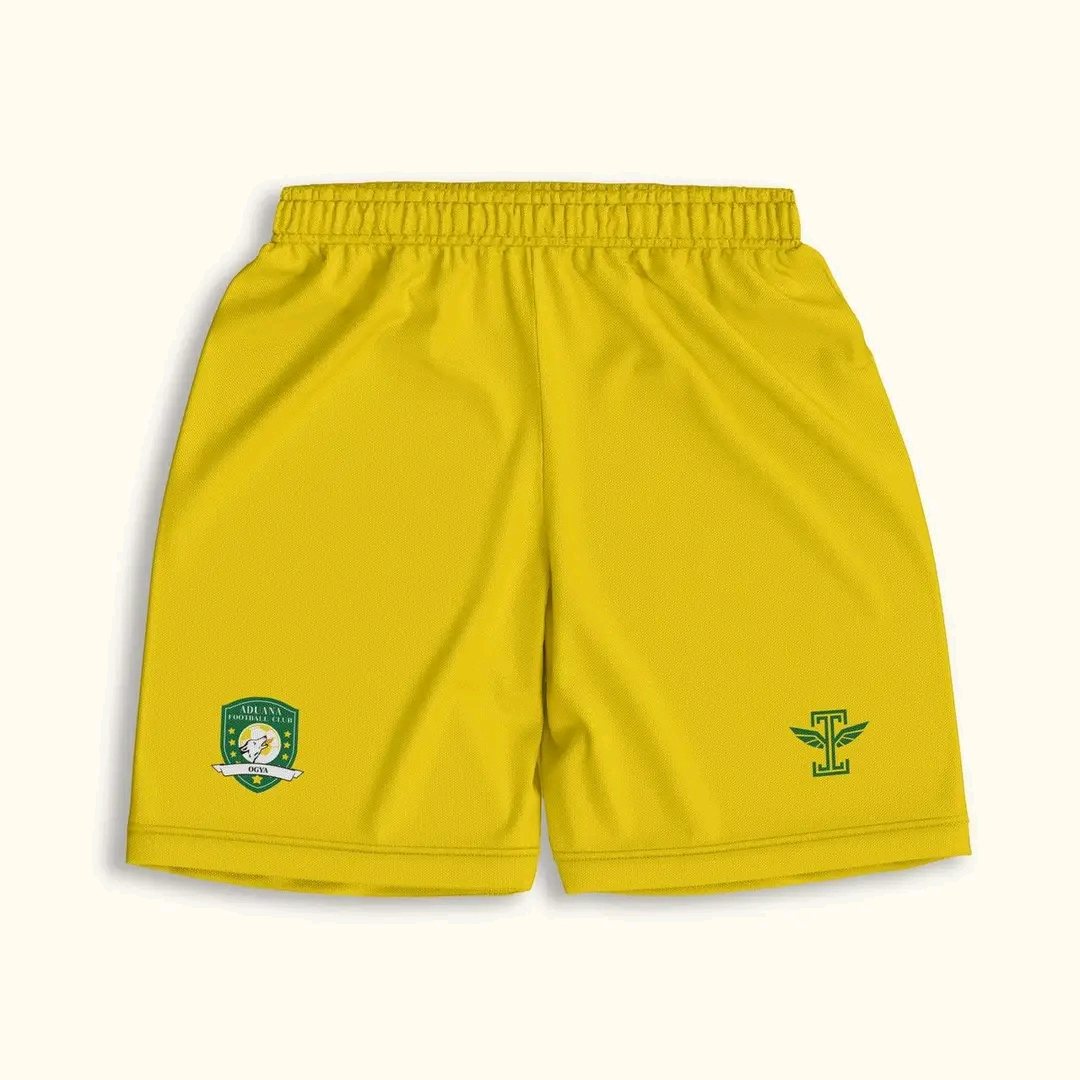
Aduana FC 2025-26 Away Shorts

== Honours ==
- Premier League
  - Champions: 2010, 2017
- Super Cup
  - Winners: 2018
- Ghalca G6
  - Winners: 2018

== Performance in CAF competitions ==
- CAF Champions League: 2 appearances

2011 – preliminary round
2018 – first round

- CAF Confederation Cup: 1 appearance

2018 – group stage

- WAFU Club Championship: 1 appearance

2011 – first round

== Club league record ==
- Club ranking record since entering Ghana Premier League(GPL)

Season	Tier	Place	Notes
2008–09	2	1st	Promotion into GPL
2009–10	1	1st	Champions
2010–11	1	5th	
2011–12	1	6th	
2012–13	1	7th	
2013–14	1	11th	
2014–15	1	3rd	
2015–16	1	2nd	Runners up
2016–17	1	1st	Champions
2017–18^{a}	1	n.a	
2018–19^{ab}	1	n.a	
2019–20^{a}	1	n.a	
2020–21	1	4	
2021–22	1	11	
2022–23	1	2nd	Runners up
2023–24	1	5th	
2024–25	1	8th	

^{a-Seasons were cancelled.}

^{ab-Season was not played, A GFA Normalization Committee Special Competition was played}

== Club captains ==
- Emmanuel Akuoko (2015–) General captain
- Godfred Saka (2016–2017)
- Joseph Addo (2017–2018)
- Yahaya Mohammed (2018)
- Elvis Opoku (2019–20)
- Joseph Addo (2020)
- Bright Adjei (2022)
- Sam Adams (2023—Present)

== Managers ==
As of March 2025, List of Aduana Managers since promotion into the Ghana Premier League in 2009.

Name	Period	Honours	Notes	Ref
(Ghana) Herbert Addo	(September 2009 – August 2011)	1 Ghana Premier League		
(Romania) Aristică Cioabă	(August 2011 – June 2012)			
(Ghana) Joseph Emmanuel Sarpong	(August 2013 – October 2013)			
(Montenegro) Milisav Bogdanović	(November 2013 – June 2014 )			
(Ghana) Abdul Rahman Kwabena Ameyaw	(January 2015 – January, 2016)			
(Ghana) Nurudeen Ahmed	(February 2016 – February 2016)			
(Romania) Aristică Cioabă	(March 2016 – October 2016)			
(Ghana) Yussif Abubakar	(November 2016 – July 2018)	1 Ghana Premier League 1 Ghana Super Cup	Sacked	
(Japan) Kenichi Yatsuhashi	(July 2018 – September 2018)		Sacked	
(Ghana) Paul Wilson Tandoh	(September 2018 – February 2020)		Interim Coach	
(Ghana) Paa Kwesi Fabian	(February 2020)		Sacked	
(Ghana) Asare Bediako	(2020–2022)		Mutual Termination	
(Ghana) Ben Bessa Zola	(2022)		Interim	
(Ghana) Felix Aboagye	(2022)		Sacked	
(Ghana) Paa Kwesi Fabin	(2022-2023)		Resigned	
(Ghana) Yaw Acheampong	(2023-2024)		Mutual Termination	
(Romania) Aristică Cioabă	(2024)		Present	

== Seasons ==
2020-2021 Aduana Football Club F.C season
