= Tempane (Ghana parliament constituency) =

Ghana parliament constituency

- constituency for the Parliament of Ghana
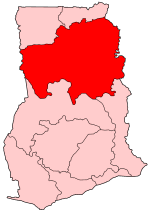
- District: Garu-Tempane District
- Region: Upper East Region of Ghana

Current constituency
- Created: 2012
- Party: National Democratic Congress
- MP: Akanvariva Lydia Lamisi

Tempane is one of the constituencies represented in the Parliament of Ghana. It elects one Member of Parliament (MP) by the first past the post system of election. Akanvariva Lydia Lamisi is the member of parliament for the constituency. The Tempane constituency is located in the Garu-Tempane District of the Upper East Region of Ghana. It was created in 2012 by dividing the Garu-Tempane constituency into two.

== Boundaries ==
The seat is located entirely within the Garu-Tempane District of the Upper East Region of Ghana.

== Members of Parliament ==
Kusasi Central
First elected	Member	Party
1954 (Gold Coast)	Jambaidu Awuni	Northern People's Party
1956 (1st Ghana parliament)	Jambaidu Awuni	Northern People's Party
Tempane
1965	Bukari Yakubu	Convention People's Party
Garu-Tempane
1969	Idana Asigri	Progress Party
1979	Dominic A. Akudago	People's National Party
1992	Dominic Azimbe Azumah	National Democratic Congress
2000	Joseph Akudibilla	Independent
2004	Dominic Azimbe Azumah	National Democratic Congress
Tempane
2012	David Adakudugu	National Democratic Congress
2016	Joseph Dindiok Kpemka	New Patriotic Party

== Elections ==
Ghanaian parliamentary election, 2016 : Tempane Source:Peacefmonline
Party	Candidates	Votes	%
NPP	Joseph Dindiok Kpemka	13,363	45.42
NDC	David Adakudugu	10,697	36.36
IND	Francis Adam Asaanah	2,925	9.94
PPP	Laar Samson Kangben	2,306	7.84
CPP	Ayaaba Samson Asaman	132	0.45

== See also ==
- List of Ghana Parliament constituencies
- List of political parties in Ghana
