= Kolmasug =

Town in Upper East region of Ghana

- Country: Ghana
- Region: Upper East region

Kolmasug is a rural community located in the Worikambo electoral area in the Garu district in the Upper East region of Ghana.

== Facilities ==
- Kolmasug Community Health and Planning Services (CHPS)
