= Yamoah =

Surname list

Yamoah is a surname. Notable people with the surname include:

- Adwoa Yamoah (born 1988), Canadian beauty pageant contestant
- Alex Yamoah (born 1995), Ghanaian footballer
- Samuel Kwadwo Yamoah (born 1956), Ghanaian politician

== See also ==
- Yamo (disambiguation)
