= St. James Seminary Senior High School =

St. James Seminary
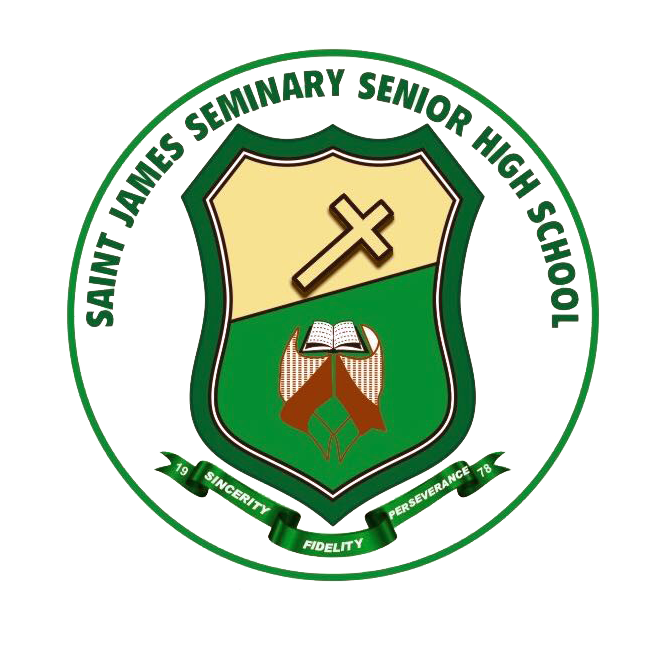
- School crest

Location
- P.O. Box 954; Bono Region; Sunyani, Bono Region; Ghana; 7.293092°N 2.291580°W

Information
- Type: Seminary, Public Secondary/High school
- Motto: Sincerity, Fidelity, Perseverance
- Religious affiliation: Christianity
- Denomination: Catholic
- Patron saint: St. James
- Founded: 1978; 48 years ago
- School district: Sunyani-East
- GES Category: A
- Rector: Rev. Father Hubert Asante-Kumi
- Rector: Rev. Fr. Hubert Asante-Kumi
- Chaplain: Rev. Fr. Augustine K. Obeng
- Grades: 10-12
- Gender: Boys
- Classes offered: General Arts, Business Studies, General Science
- Campus: Abesim
- Houses: 4
- Colours: Cream and Brown
- Nickname: Ahotefoɔ
- National ranking: 1
- Affiliation: Roman Catholic Church, Ghana
- Alumni: St. James Old Boys Association (Ahotefoɔ)
- Alumni President: Dr. Adu Appiah-Kubi
- School Anthem: Arise St. James and Shine
- School Website: stjamesseminary.edu.gh
- Alumni Website: ahotefo.com

St. James Seminary is a senior high school in Sunyani, the capital of the Bono region of Ghana, founded in 1978 by Most Rev. James Kwadwo Owusu, the late bishop of the Roman Catholic Diocese of Sunyani. It is not just a Senior High School, but also a Catholic Minor Seminary which offers a wide range of opportunities for both seminarians and non-Seminarians to make them not only aware of their potentials, but to fulfill them. The school emphasizes moral, spiritual and positive character formation in addition to striving to achieve academic excellence. St. James has been adjudged the best senior high school in Ghana over the past decade having featured consecutively in the list of top ten performing schools in the West African Examinations Council’s Senior School Certificate Exams (WASSCE) over the period. It topped the WASSCE in 2006, 2009 and 2011 and produced the overall best and third best candidates in West Africa in the 2016 exam.

Students of St. James are nicknamed ‘The Saints’ to tout their high moral uprightness and spirituality akin to the characteristics of saints. An alumnus of St. James Seminary Senior High School is openly called “Ɔhotenii” (pl. Ahotefoɔ), the Twi word for a saint.

== History ==
St. James Seminary Senior High School was established in 1978 by the late Bishop of Roman Catholic Diocese of Sunyani Most Rev. James Owusu. In spite of the initial resistance and discouragement from many quarters, St. James Seminary opened as a private school with the admission of 14 students in the first year under the supervision of Monsignor Robert Mensah Abrampah as its first rector. The subsequent rectors would encounter humongous academic and infrastructural challenges in its running to the extent of relying on a few teachers to handle multiple subjects. A story is told of the current Vicar-General of Roman Catholic Diocese of Sunyani; Monsignor Dr. George Kwame Kumi who alone taught physics, chemistry and biology for a number of years. The school also relied on part-time teachers from its current rivals Sunyani Secondary School to provide tuition to students of St. James in the early years.

Help would later come when a former headmaster of St. Peter's Boys Senior High School at Nkwatia-Kwahu, Rev. Fr. Joseph Glatzel (SVD) was transferred to Yamfo to work in the Roman Catholic Diocese of Sunyani. Rev. Fr. Glatzel single-handedly funded and supervised the construction of the school's major classroom blocks and its first ever staff bungalow. Some notable teachers who were of great help to the school in its teething years include; Charles Oko Agyeman, Reverend Father John McVoy (became 2nd rector), Rev. Sr. Gerald (Missionary Sisters Servants of the Holy Spirit), the first female teacher, Monsignor John Oppong Baah, Reverend Brother Joe Tsiquaye (Congregation of Holy Cross), among others.

The school trained seminarians through Ghana's old educational system and participated in the West African Examinations Council's General Certificate of Education (GCE) Ordinary Level Exams. Students of St. James continuously produced impeccable results year-in-year-out. However, in 1994, mainly due to the call on the Bishop by the Catholic faithful in the Sunyani Diocese for the establishment of a boys’ school to cater for their sons’ secondary education, the Bishop agreed to open up the seminary to non-seminarians to study alongside seminarians to ensure they all benefit from the high academic and moral discipline in St. James Seminary. The objective was that the future priests, and future laity, Catholics and non-Catholics, would know each other and establish cordial working relationships within and outside the church in the future.

St. James Seminary Secondary School became a government assisted school in 1994. The administration of the school has since been reserved for the church. The co-operation between seminarians and non-seminarians has been remarkably positive.

St. James offers high school-level subjects in General Arts, Business Studies and General Science programmes

== Houses ==
St. Kizito is named after the patron saint of children and the youngest of the Martyrs of Uganda who was burned alive at the age of 13–14. They wear RED jerseys.

St. Charles Lwanga is also named after another one of the Martyrs of Uganda who is now adopted as the patron saint of converts, torture victims and the African Catholic Youth Action. Students of this house wear BLUE jerseys

St. Thomas Aquinas is named after the influential Italian philosopher, theologian, and jurist regarded as the model teacher for would-be priests, foremost proponent natural theology. Aquinas boys wear the GREEN jerseys.

St. Augustine's house is named after the early Christian theologian, philosopher and bishop of Hippo Regius in North Africa whose writings and proclamations influenced the development of Western Christianity. Students of this house wear the YELLOW jerseys.

== Spirituality and guidance ==
The school regards spiritual development as central in human resource development. In pursuance of this, religious associations such as the Legion of Mary, Young Christian Students Church and the Catholic Students Union exist to develop students spiritually. Their activities include Bible studies, Bible quizzes and spiritual retreats. These groups undertake social and benevolent activities and frequently engage in clean-up exercises in and outside the school.

Recollection sessions are organized for students to help them live exemplary Christian lives.

The Guidance and Counselling Unit of the school does career, academic, personal and social counselling. Through counselling, students are able to cope with difficult school situations, as well as overcome emotional difficulties. Academic and career counselling not only help students to overcome problems in their studies, but also to identify their strengths and weaknesses.

== Bilateral cooperation and exchanges ==
St. James has a well-established bilateral relationship with St Mary's College, Dublin. Reciprocal visits to strengthen this tie and co-operation between St. James and their Irish counterpart began in 2004.

Scores of Irish High School students, teachers and medical teams have visited St. James since 2004 to have first-hand information about Ghana's educational system, as well as acquaint themselves with our cultural values, and build new relationships with their Ghanaian counterparts.

A delegation of 14, comprising students and teachers of St. James were in Ireland in 2015 for the same purpose. In 2016, St. James hosted two separate Irish delegations comprising 86 students, teachers and a medical team.

The Irish delegation attends classes, have cultural shows and play games with students of St. James Seminary whenever they visit. Another batch of St. James students also paid a reciprocal familiarization tour of Ireland in 2017.

St. James also has a young relationship with the Holy Spirit Catholic School in Tuscaloosa, Alabama, United States. In 2017, students of the Holy Spirit school made a cash donation to St. James through the Brong-Ahafo Regional Minister when he and the Chief Executives of Sunyani and Techiman visited Tuscaloosa to strengthen sister-city relations that exist between these cities.

== Rectors ==
Rev. Fr. Hubert Asante-Kumi heads the school as the current rector having taken over from Rev. Fr. Alex Ansu Ebow who retired at the end of 2021, after 18 years of dedicated service which began in 2003 when his predecessor Most Rev. Matthew Kwasi Gyamfi was appointed Bishop of the Sunyani Catholic Diocese. Most Rev. Gyamfi served between 1999 and 2003 following the retirement of Rev. Fr. Joseph Asuah in 1999.

Name	Tenure of office
Rev. Fr. Hubert Asante-Kumi	2022 – present
Rev. Fr. Alex Ansu Ebow	2003 – 2021
Most Rev. Matthew Kwasi Gyamfi	1999 - 2003
Rev. Fr. Joseph Asuah	1990 - 1999
Rev. Fr. Paul Agyei	1987 - 1990
Rev. Fr. Thomas Potts	1983 - 1987
Rev. Fr. John Mac Voy	1980 - 1983
Msgr. Mensah Abrampah	1978 - 1980

== Achievements ==
• WAEC's Distinction Award for Producing The Second Overall Best Candidate in the 2021 Ghana WASSCE, Master Ofori Gilbert Amanfo.

• WAEC's Distinction Award for Producing The Third Overall Best Candidate in the 2021 Ghana WASSCE, Master Korang Nana adjei Ransford.

• WAEC's Distinction Award for Producing The Best Candidate in The Business Programme in the 2021 Ghana WASSCE, Master Onyashiembor Sito.

• WAEC's Distinction Award for Producing The Best Candidate in The General Programme (Arts Option) in the 2021 Ghana WASSCE, Master Francis Abokua.

• Bono-Ahafo Zonal Champions, 2022 Ghana National Science and Maths Quiz (NSMQ).

• Best Performing SHS at WASSCE Science. Received from Ghana Education Service in 2017.

• WAEC's Distinction Award for Producing The Overall Best Candidate, WASSCE, West Africa and The Third Best Candidate, Ghana in the 2016 WASSCE.

• Runners-up of the 2013 National Debate Competition.

• Winners of the 2013 Queen mother's 40th Anniversary Debate Competition.

• Best academic performing school in WASSCE since 2011.

• Topped the 2009 WASSCE ranking table.

• Winners of the 2007 National Jubilee Debate organized by the Ghana Education Service.

• Topped the 2006 WASSCE ranking table.

• Winners of the 2005 National Quiz Competition on Human Rights organized by Commission on Human Rights and Administrative Justice (CHRAJ).

• Winners of the 2004 regional quiz on Horticulture organized by Parks and Gardens.

• Winners of the 2004 Quiz on HIV/AIDS organized by ActionAid Ghana.

• WAEC's Distinction Award for Producing The Second Best Candidate in the July/August 2004 WASSCE.

• Overall best student in the 2003 Northern Sector Debate on the Vice President's Campaign against Indiscipline, Master Augustine Abugri.

• Winner of the 2000 Millennium Essay on conditions for sustainable national development, Master Osei Anim Leonard.

== Notable Alumni ==
- George Atta-Boateng
