= Kusasi =

Kusasi may refer to:

- Kusasi people
- Kusaal language
