= Garu – Tempane (Ghana parliament constituency) =

Ghana parliament constituency

Garu - Tempane
- constituency for the Parliament of Ghana
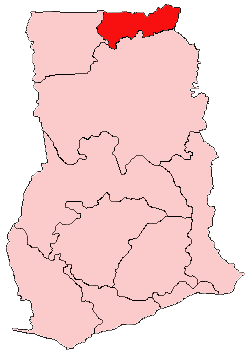
- District: Garu-Tempane District
- Region: Upper East Region of Ghana

Current constituency
- Created: 1969
- Party: National Democratic Congress
- MP: Anabah Thomas Winsum

Garu - Tempane is one of the constituencies represented in the Parliament of Ghana. It elects one Member of Parliament (MP) by the first past the post system of election. Anabah Thomas Winsum is the member of parliament for the constituency. Garu - Tempane is located in the Garu-Tempane district of the Upper East Region of Ghana.

== Boundaries ==
The seat is located within the Garu-Tempane District in the Upper East Region of Ghana. The constituency was divided to form the Garu and Tempane constituencies respectively in 2012.

== Members of Parliament ==
Kusasi Central
First elected	Member	Party
1954 (Gold Coast)	Jambaidu Awuni	Northern People's Party
1956 (1st Ghana parliament)	Jambaidu Awuni	Northern People's Party
Tempane
1965	Bukari Yakubu	Convention People's Party
Garu-Tempane
1969	Idana Asigri	Progress Party
1979	Dominic A. Akudago	People's National Party
1992	Dominic Azimbe Azumah	National Democratic Congress
2000	Joseph Akudibilla	Independent
2004	Dominic Azimbe Azumah	National Democratic Congress

== Elections ==
2008 Ghanaian parliamentary election: Garu - Tempane Source:Ghana Home Page
Party	Candidate	Votes	%	±%
National Democratic Congress	Dominic Azimbe Azumah	16,318	47.8	
New Patriotic Party	Samari Alhassan	15,560	45.9	
Convention People's Party	Chris Anaba Allem	471	1.4	
People's National Convention	Tuyaab Haruna Mintar	445	1.3	
Democratic Freedom Party	Dahamani Edward	1,241	3.6	
Majority		1,271	6.6	
Turnout				—

== See also ==
- List of Ghana Parliament constituencies
