= Seid Mubarak =

Ghanaian politician (born 1983)

Hon. Seid Mubarak
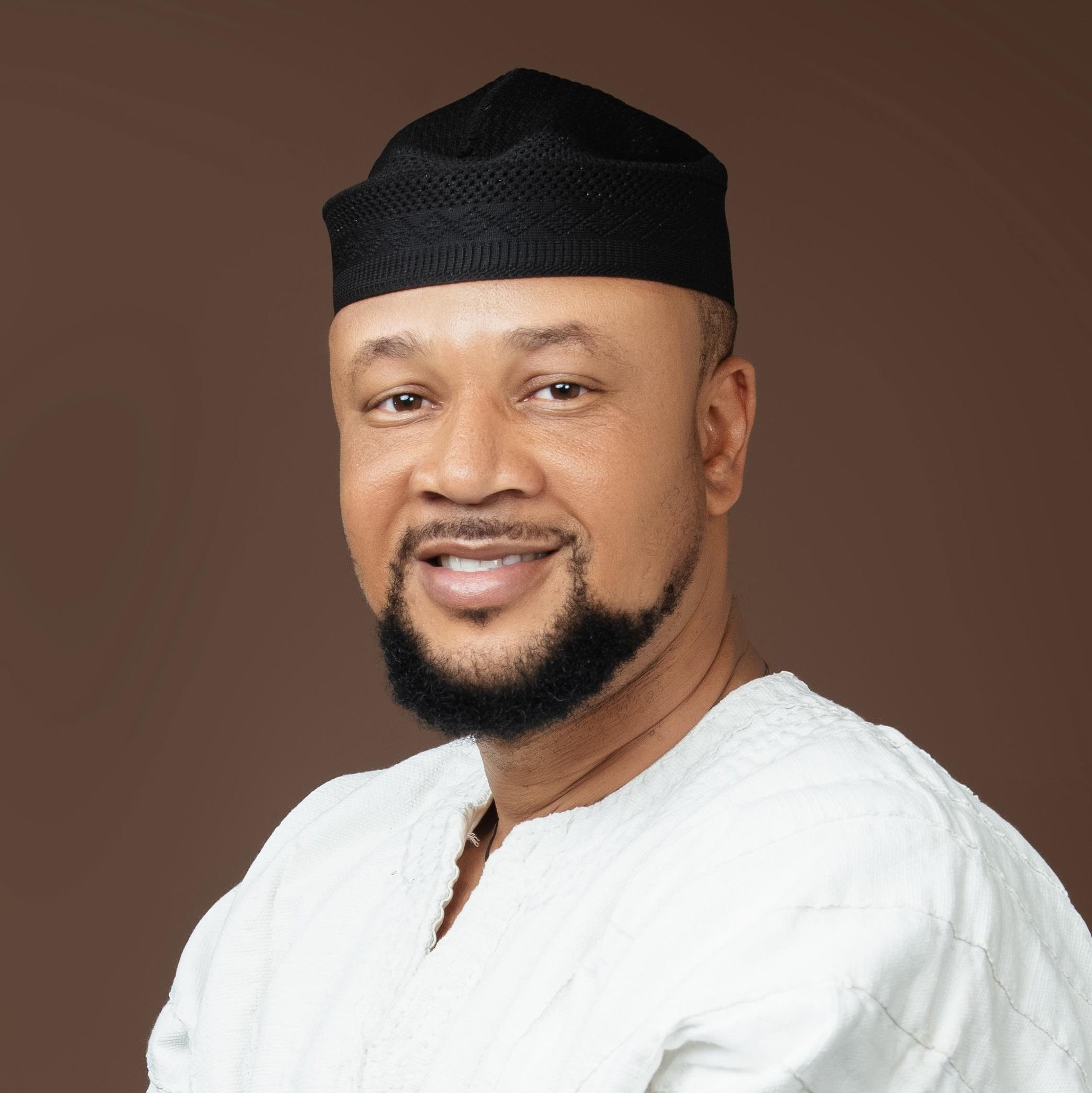

Member of Parliament for Sunyani East
- Incumbent
- Assumed office 7 January 2024
- Preceded by: Kwasi Ameyaw-Cheremeh

Personal details
- Born: Seid Mubarak; 6 March 1983 (age 43) Abesim, Ghana
- Party: National Democratic Congress
- Occupation: Politician

Seid Mubarak (born March 6, 1983) is a Ghanaian politician and the member of parliament for the Sunyani East constituency in the 9th parliament of the 4th republic of Ghana.

== Early life and education ==
Seid Mubarak was born on March 6, 1983. He hails from Abesim, a town located near Sunyani in the Bono region of Ghana. He pursued Bachelor of Science in Resources Enterprise and Entrepreneurship at the University of Energy and Natural Resources (UENR) in Sunyani.

== Career ==
Seid Mubarak served as the Director of Operations at the Youth Employment Agency (YEA) before being elected as the Member of Parliament for Sunyani East in 2024. His role at the YEA focused on youth empowerment and job creation, laying the foundation for his transition into politics.

== Politics ==
Seid Mubarak is a member of the National Democratic Congress (NDC). He began his political career in 2019 when he contested and lost in the NDC parliamentary primaries. He again contested in the 2024 parliamentary primaries, where this time he won an represented the NDC in the 2024 Ghana general elections and won

== 2024 elections ==
The 2024 parliamentary election in the Sunyani East Constituency saw a major political change as Seid Mubarak of the National Democratic Congress (NDC) defeated the incumbent New Patriotic Party (NPP) Member of Parliament, Kwasi Ameyaw-Cheremeh. Mubarak secured 34,453 votes, while Ameyaw-Cheremeh received 22,306 votes. Other candidates included Independent aspirant Ransford Antwi, who polled 8,294 votes, and Sampson Alannyina Sampana of the People's National Convention (PNC), who garnered 222 votes.
