= Sunyani East (Ghana parliament constituency) =

Constituency in the Bono Region of Ghana

- constituency for the Parliament of Ghana
- District: Sunyani District
- Region: Bono Region of Ghana

Current constituency
- Party: National Democratic Congress
- MP: Seid Mubarak

Sunyani East is a parliamentary constituency in the Bono Region of Ghana. The current member of parliament (MP) for this constituency is Seid Mubarak.

== Current MP ==
Seid Mubarak is the current MP for the Sunyani East constituency. He was elected on the ticket of the National Democratic Congress(NDC) and won a with a simple majority of 34,453 votes representing 52.7% to become the MP. He succeeded Kwasi Ameyaw-Cheremeh, who had also represented the constituency in the 4th Republic parliament on the ticket of the NPP.

== See also ==
- List of Ghana Parliament constituencies
