= Belingogo =

Belingogo is a small community in the Garu-Tempane District of the Upper East Region of Ghana which forms one of the nine districts in the region.The District is located in the South Eastern corner of the Upper East Region of the Republic of Ghana and shares boundaries with, Bawku Municipal to the North, Binduri to the North West, Pusiga District to North East, East Mamprusi District to the South West, Bunkpurugu-Yunyoo District to South East, Bawku West District to the West and the Republic of Togo to the East. It covers an area of 1,230 km^{2}. It lies on approximately latitude 10^{o}38'N and 11^{o}N and longitude 0^{o} 06' E and 0^{o} 23l E. The administrative capital is Garu.

== Location ==
On the main highway at the southern part of Garu township that leads to Nakpanduri, you would get to a small town called Dabillah which covers a distance of about six (6) kilometers. Belingogo Junction which is boldly written on a signboard can now be located at the left hand side of about quarter a kilometer on the Dabillah to Worikambo road.

== History ==
The Kusasi people were the indigenous inhabitant in the community in the early centuries before other trip like Bimoba also joined them later. According to the first man to settle in the community, on his arrival he saw that the whole land was as silent as that of a cemetery, very dark and tall trees with no human voice heard anywhere around and then, he felt scared in him that some spirits might be dominating in the area. Prompting fear and panic, he shouted at the top of his voice,"Agoo, Belingooo ye", 'meaning excuse me please', I beg is anybody here? Please allow me to dwell here". Hence the name Belingogo was given.

== Community people ==
Belingogo has a total estimated number of about one thousand (1000) people. The commonest language spoken by the people in this community is Kusaal and their main occupation is farming. They cultivates all sort of crops like groundnuts, millet, maize, sweet potato and many more. The people in this community used to cultivate cash crop like cotton which has over the past few years been one of the main source of income generation in the community till of late when the rainfall pattern and climate changes does no longer support the crop forcing the farmers to thwart its cultivation.

== Education and Developmental projects ==
Belingogo is best known to many other people as educational zone due to the increasing number of high educationalists in the community. They are proud to have owned to themselves graduates from most of the top tertiary institutions in Ghana who also occupy meaningful jobs and positions in Ghana and Africa at large. If it were left unto every constituency and their respective communities to manage his own affairs, Belingogo would have had nothing to worry about since they have all the necessary human sector needed for any development. They have professional managers who have all the required skills in managing any available human resource, always ready to exercise self supervision, self monitoring and evaluations, self-discipline, honesty, dedication and hard work.

They got also, reliable accountants who are well equip with banking skills with four to five years working experience who also apply to its fullest, modern system of banking securities as well as safety from internet fraudsters. Engineering is not left out in Belingogo as it is the backbone for the development of any nation, there are engineers in the community who underwent several years of intensive studies in the engineering field who apply safety techniques in their work, are able to apply what they have learned in their daily activities. For the seek of safety and reliability in electrical wiring, people travel all the way from Garu and many other places to fetch electricians from Belingogo to do their wiring for them simply because of the exceptional experience those electrical engineers in the community got.

Overwhelming messages of recommendations always become a companion in the lives of the Agricultural engineers in terms of ranking. In fact, as the whole world solely depends on Agriculture for its food stuff, some of the youth were advised to study much into agriculture to boost food productivity to help reduce poverty and hunger and they paid heed to exactly that. The people in this community scarcely ran into a lost during any farming season because of the reports and advice on climate changes, weather forecast and rainfall pattern that they receives from their own produced agricultural engineers. Belingogo has a meaningful record to write home about when to talk of health sector workers.

There are public Nurses in the community who give assistance to all and sundry by teaching them how to prevent some silent killer diseases like cholera, malaria, yellow fever and many more. They teaches how to keep the environment clean and free from disease causing organisms like housefly and mosquitoes. The mentally challenged are not left behind as they have psychiatric nurses who are specialized in that field to take care of them without any calamities. In the recent calls of the youth in the community on the District assembly to provide extra sources of water, as well as the government's fulfillment on his earlier promise and commitment to providing good drinking water for all, two additional boreholes were provided to the people in the community in June, 2013 and January 2016 respectively. This move for development has in diverse ways helped improve the health of the people as well as the reduction of long hours that women, boys and girls used to spend on long queues at the expense of doing other assignments just to wait for their turn to access drinking water.

== Rural Electrification ==
Though the community for over some years ago has not considered any pressing problem which might need immediate attention, however unavailability of electricity is now emerging as one. In fact, although countless, unprecedented and gargantuan promises has ever been made by the member of parliament (MP) for the area, honorable Dominic Azimbe Azumah, none proved futile. On the just ended parliamentary primaries election held late in November 2015, some agitated youth of the community triggered to question the MP when he visited the community as part of his campaign tour, why after the countless promises made to them, failed to materialize but they were not allowed by the organizers claiming they were not there on that day for questions adding there was no enough time. The zonal chairman of the ruling National Democratic Congress (NDC), together with other members of the organizing team of the party, spoke on behalf of the MP assuring the youth to exercise patience and give the MP the mandate into power once again and they shall lobby together for the electricity and many other developmental projects. They seems to have gotten another assurance this time but their thoughts all went in a wayward direction as the incumbent MP, honourable Azimbe Azumah lost his bid to the District Chief Executive (DCE), Albert Alazuga by a great margin of votes. The youth of the community are therefore pleading unto the District Assembly and all the associated channels to come to their aid to electrify their community.

== Sports ==
When it comes to the field of sports, the name Belingogo is always placed on the top list and underline boldly. They got a very strong football team which always comes first among all the neighboring communities. Due to everybody's dedication and commitment to football including the elderly, the chief of the community has allocated a large portion of land for sporting activities. The youth goes there all the time including sacrificing some time out of their busy schedules to rehearse on their dribbling, midfield, defense and all the other positions of play just to be kept fit and ready all the time to face any community who dare to stand a challenge on them in terms of football. To mention a few of some of the outstanding and unique players, they have people like, Ayamba Fusheini, George Ndago aka Andrés Iniesta, Abugri Awini, Aginanchen Maxwell, George Issaku aka Stephen Appiah, Abugbillah Jacob and many more. They have played and won several times against some of the neighboring communities like, Dabillah, Kugpiela, Kpatia, Zaari, Niisbuliga and zaarizua.

== Funeral and Marriage supports ==
When someone passes away in the community it becomes the concern of everybody irrespective of the deceased coming from your family or clan, they all gather together to the family of the bereaved to show their heartfelt condolences to the departed one. Because of this they all come to terms with one another that if this irreversible natural routine is left unto individual accord, it does not really portray any real love for one another as brothers and sisters of the same community. Due to this, a short meeting was held and it was discussed and accepted by everyone that if a member is in grief over the loss of a loved one, they should all come together to console by contributing some money to help carry out the funeral activities. They always use part of these contributions to hire either drummers or public address system where all the youth are expected to come out in their numbers and dance together to wish the deceased a farewell to the ancestral world. If it is the drummers too the youth have got their dress code called smock that everyone will put on in a uniform way dancing energetically in a queue around the funeral house whiles exhibiting their culture in a unique way. This they perform, is not only done when a person dies but is also applied during final funeral rites depending on the age of the deceased. The people in this community don't only offer support and care when someone dies but rather does the same when a member happen to get married or when a new baby is born. They present gifts to the bride and the groom in a form of either money, soap or cooking utensils wishing them a happy and blessed marriage.
