= Dominic Azimbe Azumah =

Ghanaian politician

Hon. Dominic Azumah

Member of the Ghana Parliament for Garu-Tempane
- In office 7 January 1993 – 6 January 2001
- Preceded by: New
- Succeeded by: Joseph Kojo Akudibilah
- In office 7 January 2005 – 6 January 2017
- Preceded by: Joseph Kojo Akudibilah
- Succeeded by: Akuka Albert Alalzuuga

Personal details
- Born: 10 January 1950 (age 76) Garu
- Party: National Democratic Congress
- Education: Institute of Local Government Studies
- Occupation: Accountant

Dominic Azimbe Azumah (born 1 January 1950) is a Ghanaian politician who was a member of the first, second, fourth, fifth and sixth Parliaments of the Fourth Republic of Ghana. He represented the Garu-Tempane Constituency in the Upper East Region on the ticket of the National Democratic Congress.

== Early life and education ==
Azumah was born on 1 January 1950. He hails from Garu, a town in the Upper East Region of Ghana. He entered the Institute of Local Government Studies, Ghana and obtained his certificate in Local Government Administration.

== Career ==
Azumah is an Accountant by profession.

== Politics ==
EAzumah is a member of the National Democratic Congress (NDC). He first became a member of the parliament in January 1993 following the 1992 Ghanaian parliamentary election. He retained the seat until December 2000 when he lost the seat to Akuka Albert Alalzuuga, who then contested as an independent candidate. He contested for the parliamentary seat of his constituency in the 2004 general election and subsequently regained the seat, becoming a member of the 4th parliament of the 4th Republic of Ghana in January 2005. He served in this capacity after winning subsequent elections until 6 January 2017. He was succeeded by Akuka Albert Alalzuuga, also of the NDC.

In 2012, Azumah doubled as a Minister of State in the Atta Mills government.

== Elections ==
He was elected into the first parliament of the fourth republic of Ghana on 7 January 1993, after he was pronounced winner at the 1992 Ghanaian parliamentary election held on 29 December 1992.

Following his loss in the 2000 general election, Azumah later reclaimed the seat as the member of parliament for the Garu-Tempane constituency of the Upper East Region of Ghana in the 2004 Ghanaian general elections. He won on the ticket of the National Democratic Congress. His constituency was a part of the 9 parliamentary seats out of 13 seats won by the National Democratic Congress in that election in the Upper East Region.

The National Democratic Congress won a minority total of 94 parliamentary seats out of 230 seats. He was elected with 18,705 votes out of 34,020 total valid votes cast. This was equivalent to 55% of total valid votes cast. He was elected over Pullam William of the Peoples’ National Convention, Joseph Akudbillahh of the New Patriotic Party and Anabah Joseph Benibah of the Convention People's Party. These obtained 1,878, 13,067 and 370 votes respectively of total votes cast. These were equivalent to 5.5%, 38.4% and 1.1% respectively of total valid votes cast.

== Personal life ==
Azumah is a Christian (Catholic). He is married with four children.
