= John Bosco Nabarese =

Ghanaian judge

John Bosco Nabarese is a Ghanaian judge. In 2013, he was sworn in as a Justice of the High Court along with 13 others. In 2025, he was sworn in as a Justice of the Court of Appeal by John Mahama along with 20 others.

== Biography ==
In 2012, he was the First Deputy Secretary of the Judicial Service of Ghana.

In 2024, he presided in the final stage of the 2024 Moot Court Competition along with Her Ladyship Justice Mrs. Mavis Akua Andoh, and Her Ladyship Ellen Lordina Serwaa Mireku.

In 2025, he was criticized by Deborah Seyram Adablah, a former NSS personnel in social media videos after he presided over her case.
