= George Kumi =

Ghanaian diplomat and politician

Ghana's Ambassador to Libya

High Commissioner to Nigeria

Personal details
- Born: 7 September 1956 (age 70) Sunyani, Bono Region
- Children: 3
- Education: KNUST; University of Lagos
- Profession: Chief Executive Officer

George Kumi is a Ghanaian former diplomat and a politician.

== Early life and education ==
Kumi was born on 7 September 1956 and hails from Sunyani in the then Brong Ahafo Region (currently Bono Region) of Ghana. He had his bachelor's degree in Land Economy at the KNUST in 1982. He further had his MBA in 1996 from the University of Lagos in Nigeria.

== Career ==
Kumi is a former High Commissioner to Nigeria and former Ambassador to Libya during Kufour's administration. He replaced Alhaji Basit Abdulai Fuseini Danso as the Ambassador of Ghana to Libya. In 2021, he was the Chairman of the Sunyani Stakeholders for Development Association. He was the District Chief Executive for the Sunyani District in the then Brong Ahafo Region of Ghana. He was also the chief executive officer of Georgio-Investment Limited. He was also in partnership with Mark Odu and Company.

== Politics ==
In 2015, Kumi is a member of the New Patriotic Party (NPP). He contested in the NPPs primaries where he lost to Kwesi Ameyaw-Kyeremeh with 387 votes whiles Ameyaw-Kyeremeh had 388 votes in the Sunyani East Constituency.

In the 2016 Ghanaian general election, Kumi contested as an independent parliamentary candidate for the Sunyani East Constituency and lost. Kumi had 15, 911 votes which represented 22.79% of the total votes whiles the Incumbent Ameyaw-Cheremeh had 38,009 votes which represented 54.45% of the total votes.

In 2020, he decided not to contest in New Patriotic Party primaries in Sunyani East Constituency.

== Personal life ==
Kumi is married with three children. He enjoys travelling and reading.

== Philanthropy ==
In 2020, Kumi presented a sum of ¢10,000, paraphernalia, about 400 T-shirts and five motorcycles to the Bono Regional branch of the NPP.
