= Suleman Adamu Sanid =

Ghanaian politician (born 1970)

Hon. Suleman Adamu Sanid
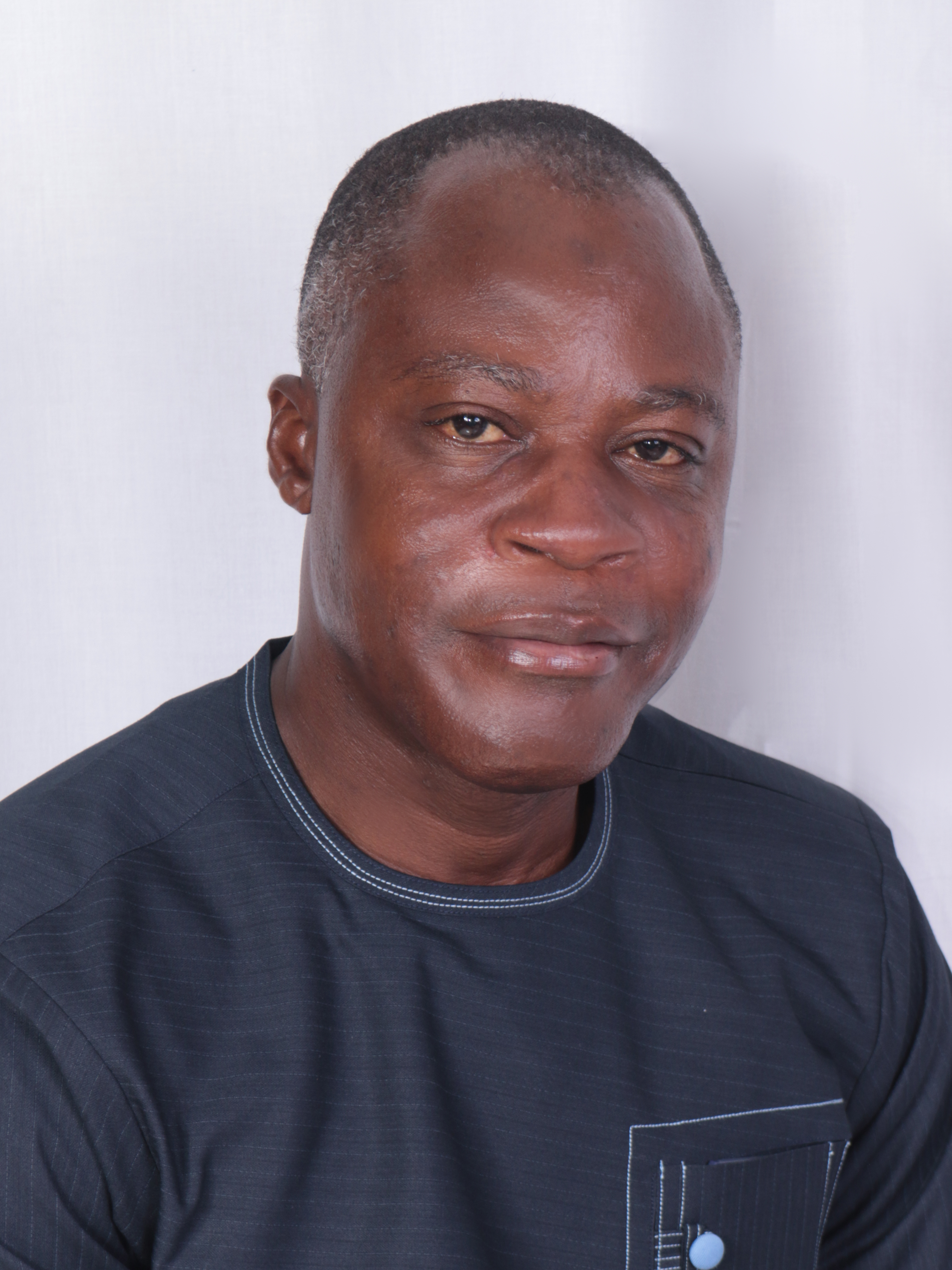

Member of Parliament for Ahafo Ano North Constituency
- In office 7 January 2021 – 6 January 2025
- Succeeded by: Eric Nana Agyemang-Prempeh

Personal details
- Born: Suleman Adamu Sanid; 13 November 1970 (age 55) Worikambo, Ghana
- Party: New Patriotic Party
- Occupation: Politician
- Committees: Local Government and Rural Development Committee; Poverty Reduction Strategy Committee and Privileges Committee

Suleman Adamu Sanid (born 13 November 1970) is a Ghanaian politician and member of the Seventh Parliament of the Fourth Republic of Ghana and the 8th Parliament of the Fourth Republic of Ghana, representing the Ahafo Ano North Constituency in the Ashanti Region on the ticket of the New Patriotic Party.

== Early life and education ==
Suleman hails from Worikambo in the Garu-Tempane District in the Upper East region of Ghana. He had his WAEC Ordinary-Level in 1988. He also holds MBA (Marketing) from the Central University in Accra; BA (History), University of Ghana - Legon in 1997.

== Career ==
Suleman was the acting Manager of Organizational Development and Management System at Volta River Authority.

== Political career ==
Sulemana is a member of the New Patriotic Party and represented the Ahafo Ano North constituency in the Seventh and Eighth Parliament of the Fourth Republic of Ghana.

=== 2016 election ===
Suleman is a member of the NPP. Until his election into the Seventh Parliament of the Fourth Republic of Ghana, Suleman polled 18,895 votes out of 37,478 representing 51.11%, to beat his main contender of the National Democratic Congress, Kwasi Adusei who polled 14,479 representing 9.16% in the 2016 Ghanaian general election.

==== 2020 election ====
He was re-elected in the 2020 Ghanaian general election to represent in the 8th Parliament of the Fourth Republic of Ghana. He had 21,581 votes making 50.67% of the total votes, while the NDC parliamentary candidate Kwasi Adusei had 19,013 votes making 44.64% of the total votes.

=== Committees ===
Suleman is the vice-chairperson of the Local Government and Rural Development Committee, a member of the Poverty Reduction Strategy Committee and also a member of the Privileges Committee.

== Personal life ==
Suleman is married with three children He is a Christian. His children are named Wintima, Yelsom and Seli. His wife is named Yorm Abra Sanid.
