= Idana Asigri =

Ghanaian politician

Member of the Ghana Parliament for Tempane-Garu
- In office 1969–1972
- Preceded by: Military government
- Succeeded by: Parliament dissolved

Personal details
- Citizenship: Ghana
- Occupation: Traditional Ruler

Idana Asigri is a Ghanaian politician and member of the first parliament of the second republic of Ghana representing Tempane-Garu Constituency under the membership of the Progress Party (PP).

== Politics ==
He is a Member of the First Parliament of the Second Republic of Ghana representing the Tempane-Garu Constituency in the Western region of Ghana on the ticket of the Progress Party (PP). He was elected in 1969 Ghanaian parliamentary election of the parliamentary term of the 1st Parliament of the 2nd Republic of Ghana. The Parliament started on 1 October 1969 and was suspended following the overthrow of the Busia government on 13 January 1972.

== Personal life ==
He is a Christian. He is a Traditional Ruler. His father Mahamadu Asigri Duut was the chief of Worikambo a town in Tempane - Garu in the Upper East region of Ghana.
