= Adiyiah =

Adiyiah is a Ghanaian surname. Notable people with the surname include:

- Dominic Adiyiah (born 1989), Ghanaian footballer
- Richard Akuoko Adiyiah (1955–2022), Ghanaian politician
