= Theresa Adjei-Mensah =

Theresa Adjei-Mensah is a Ghanaian diplomat who serves as Ghana's Ambassador to the Czech Republic. She is a member of the Ghana Ministry of Foreign Affairs.

== Career ==
=== Appointment and nomination ===
In June 2025, Theresa Adjei-Mensah was nominated as Ambassador-designate to the Czech Republic as part of a list of diplomatic appointments announced by the Government of Ghana.

=== Commissioning ===
She was officially commissioned as Ambassador by John Dramani Mahama on 19 November 2025 at a ceremony held at the Presidency in Accra. During the ceremony, she took the Oaths of Allegiance, Office, and Secrecy alongside other envoys appointed to represent Ghana in various countries.

=== Ambassador to the Czech Republic ===
Following her commissioning, Adjei-Mensah assumed her role as Ghana's Ambassador to the Czech Republic. She formally presented her letters of credence to Petr Pavel, President of the Czech Republic, on 14 January 2026, marking the official start of her diplomatic mission.

As ambassador, she serves as Ghana's chief diplomatic representative in the Czech Republic, with responsibilities including strengthening bilateral relations, promoting trade and investment, facilitating cultural and educational cooperation and providing consular services to Ghanaian nationals.

== Other engagements ==
Prior to her departure for post, Adjei-Mensah engaged with traditional leadership in Ghana, including a farewell visit to the Sunyani Traditional Council, where her contributions to the community were acknowledged.
