= Akanvariva Lydia Lamisi =

Ghanaian politician

Hon. Akanvariva Lydia Lamisi
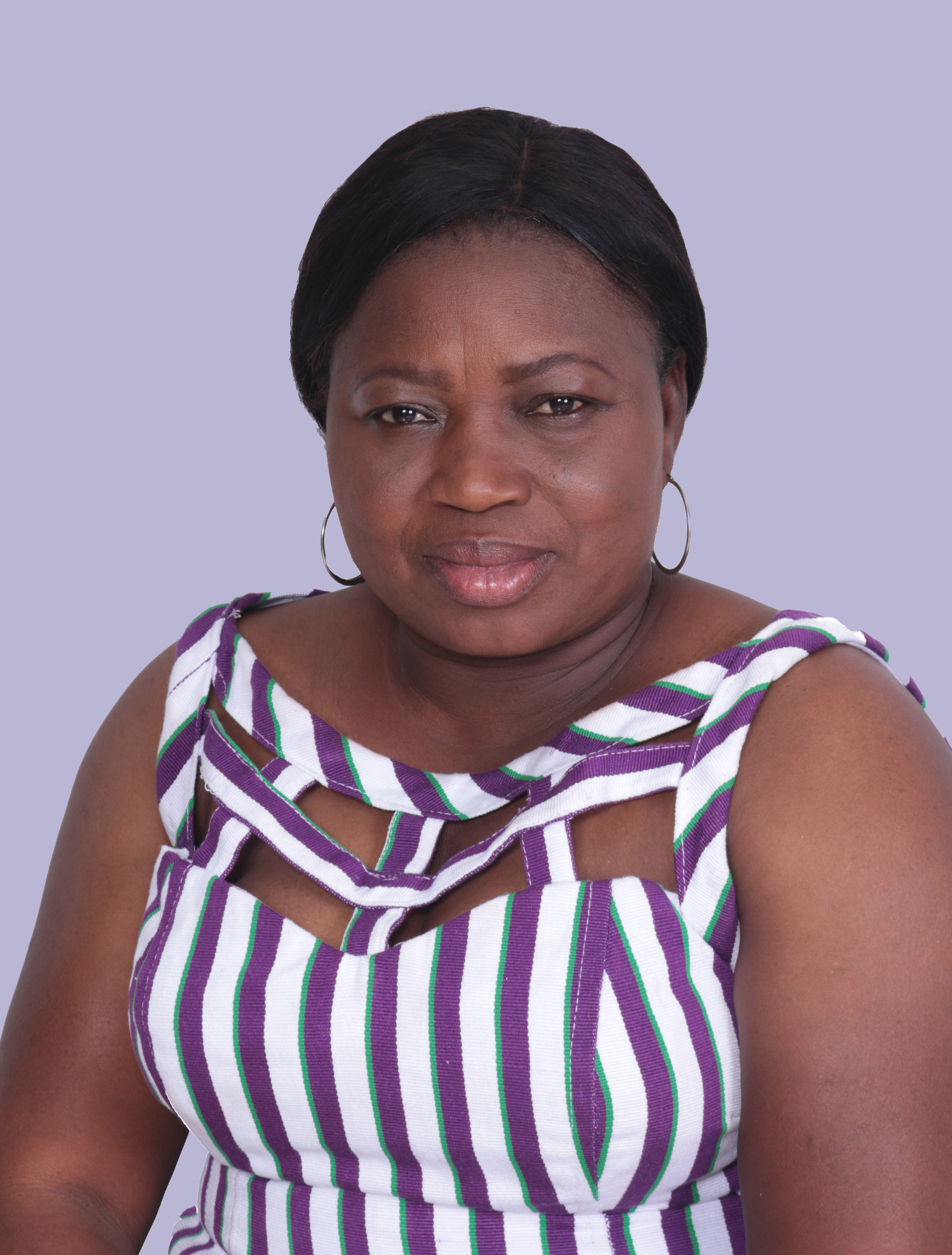

Member of Parliament for Tempane (Ghana parliament constituency)
- Incumbent
- Assumed office 7 January 2021

Personal details
- Party: National Democratic Congress (Ghana)
- Spouse: David Adakudugu (deceased)
- Profession: Nurse

Akanvariva Lydia Lamisi (also known as Lydia Akanvariba Lamisi and Lydia Lamisi Akanvariva) is a Ghanaian nurse, a politician and a member of parliament for the Tempane Constituency of the Kusaug traditional area in the upper east region. She contested in the 2020 Ghanaian General Election at her constituency and won the parliamentary seat. She was appointed by President John Dramani Mahama as the Minister of State for Public Sector Reforms.

== Early life and education ==
She was born on 7 October, 1973.She was born at Tempane and she is a Christian. She studied Nursing and has LLB (Law).

== Politics ==
Lamisi is a member of the National Democratic Congress ( NDC). Her late husband, David Adakudugu was the Member of parliament for Tempane Constituency. After the death of her husband while serving in office, she decided to replace him as the Member of parliament for the same constituency.

In December 2020, she was elected member of Parliament for the Tempane Constituency after she competed in the 2020 Ghanaian General Election under the ticket of the National Democratic Congress. She polled 20,939 votes which represents 56.0% of the total votes cast. She was elected over Joseph Dindiok Kpemka of the New Patriotic Party who also polled 16,462 votes which translates to 44.0% of total valid votes cast.

== Personal life ==
She is the widow of the late David Adakudugu.
