= Dabila, Ghana =

Town in Upper East region of Ghana

Dabila
- Interactive map of Dabila
- Coordinates: 10°45′25″N 0°10′48″W
- Country: Ghana
- Region: Upper East region

Dabila is a town in the Garu district in the Upper East region of Ghana.

== Facilities ==
- Dabila Community Health and Planning Services (CHPS)
