= Samuel Kwadwo Yamoah =

Ghanaian politician and businessman

MP for Ahafo Ano North
- In office 7 January 1993 – 6 January 1997
- President: Jerry John Rawlings
- Preceded by: Constituency merged
- Succeeded by: Baffour Annor

Personal details
- Born: 16 May 1956 (age 70) Tepa, Ashanti Region, Gold Coast (now Ghana)
- Party: National Democratic Congress
- Education: Osei Kyeretwie Secondary School
- Occupation: Politician
- Profession: Businessman

Samuel Kwadwo Yamoah (born 16 May 1956) is a Ghanaian politician and was a member of the first parliament of the fourth Republic representing the Ahafo Ano North constituency in the Ashanti Region. He represented the National Democratic Congress.

== Early life and education ==
Yamoah was born on 16 May 1956 at Tepa in the Ashanti Region of Ghana by the late Mad Adwoa Benewaa (Beautiful) and Late Papa Kojo Yamoah . He attended the Osei Kyeretwie Secondary School where he obtained his GCE Ordinary Level.He served as a banker at Tepa SSB bank before becoming the member of parliament for the ahafo ano north district constituency

== Politics ==
Yamoah was elected into parliament on the ticket of the National Democratic Congress for the Ahafo Ano North Constituency in the Ashanti Region of Ghana during the December 1992 Ghanaian parliamentary election. He was succeeded by Baffour Annor after serving for one term. During the 1996 Ghanaian general election, Baffour Annor polled 12,536 votes out of the total valid votes cast representing 45.70% over James Brownford Donkor of the New Patriotic Party who polled 9,628 votes representing 35.10% and Kwabena Nketia of the People's National Congress who polled 355 votes representing 1.30% of the total valid votes cast.

== Career ==
Aside politics, Yamoah is a businessman. He has had working experiences in banking, and building construction. He has also worked in the transportation industry, and served as a football coach.

== Personal life ==
Yamoah is a Christian and married.
