= Northerner (Ghana) =

Ghanaian demographic

A Northerner is an unestablished informal term used by the public, especially people of southern Ghana, to refer to Ghanaians who hail from the three northernmost Regions of Ghana namely; the Northern, Upper East and Upper West regions. Examples are Dagombas, Kusasis, Gurunsi and Wala people. Its opposite, Southerner - is largely used by people of Northern Ghana to describe Ghanaians who hail from southern Ghana. Zongo people though significantly represented across the country are excluded from such categorizations because they do not come from any of Ghana's ethnic tribes.

However, official cardinal classifications of Ghana consist of the Savanna, middle and Coastal belts. This type of categorization is relevant in meteorology and agriculture. Often times, the terms Southern and Northern zones are used to divide the country into two halves - Ashanti, Brong-Ahafo, Northern, Upper West and Upper East regions on one end, and Greater Accra, Central, Western, Eastern, and volta on the other, respectively.
