= Samanpiid Festival =

Festival in Ghana by the Kusasis

The Samanpiid Festival is an annual festival celebrated by the Kusasis in the Kusaug Traditional Area in the Upper East Region of Ghana. The festival is one that is used to thank God for a bumper harvest during the farming season. The festival was first celebrated in 1987. The 26th Anniversary had former president Jerry John Rawlings as a guest speaker.
