= Mavis Akua Andoh =

Ghanaian female Judge

Her Ladyship Mavis Akua Andoh

Justice of the High Court of Ghana
- Incumbent
- Assumed office 17 December 2019
- Appointed by: Nana Addo Dankwa Akufo-Addo

Personal details
- Citizenship: Ghanaian
- Education: University of Ghana School of Law (LLB); Ghana School of Law (BL)
- Occupation: Judge, Lawyer
- Profession: Jurist

Her Ladyship Justice Mavis Akua Andoh is a Ghanaian judge serving on the High Court of Ghana. She was appointed to the bench in December 2019 and currently presides over the Commercial Division of the High Court in Accra. She is known for handling high-value commercial disputes as well as high-profile criminal cases, including the Abesim murder case.

== Education ==
Justice Mavis Andoh obtained her Bachelor of Laws (LLB) degree from the University of Ghana School of Law, Legon. She subsequently proceeded to the Ghana School of Law in Accra, where she completed the Professional Law Course and was awarded the Barrister-at-Law (BL) certificate. Upon successful completion, she was called to the Bar as a Barrister and Solicitor of the Supreme Court of Ghana, becoming entitled to practice law in all courts in the country.

== Career ==
Justice Andoh was among the 33 High Court Judges who were sworn into office by the former President Nana Addo Dankwa Akufo-Addo on December 17, 2019, in a ceremony at the Banquet Hall of Jubilee House in Accra.

Justice Andoh currently presides over the Commercial Division of the High Court in Accra. In this capacity, she handles complex commercial disputes involving significant claims.
