= Garu District =

District in Upper East Region, Ghana

- District
- Nickname: G-town
- Districts of Upper East Region

- Location of Garu District within Upper East
- Coordinates: 10°51′12.96″N 0°10′47.64″W
- Country: Ghana
- Region: Upper East
- Capital: Garu

Government
  - District Executive: Emmanuel Sin-Nyet Asigri

Area
  - Total: 1,230 km^{2} (470 sq mi)

Population (2021)
  - Total: 71,774
- Time zone: UTC+0 (GMT)
- ISO 3166 code: GH-UE-GR

Garu District is one of the 15 districts in Upper East Region, Ghana. Originally it was formerly part of the then-larger Garu-Tempane District in 2004. The southeast part of the district was split off to create Tempane District on 15 February 2018 and the remaining part has been renamed as Garu District. The district assembly is located in the eastern part of Upper East Region. Its administrative capital is Garu.

Like many districts in the Upper East Region, agriculture likely plays a significant role in the local economy. Many residents are engaged in subsistence farming and petty trading.

Garu Community Senior High is a senior high school located in the district

The predominant local language spoken in Garu is Kusaal, which is common in that part of Ghana.

The district experiences a tropical savanna climate, typical of northern Ghana, with a single rainy season followed by a long dry season.

Their member of parliament is Hon. Albert Akuka Alalzuuga.

== See also ==
- Belingogo, a small community within Garu District

== Sources ==
- "Districts of Ghana". Statoids.
