= Tempane District =

- District
- Districts of Upper East Region

- Location of Tempane District within Upper East
- Coordinates: 10°45′17.28″N 0°11′13.2″W
- Country: Ghana
- Region: Upper East
- Capital: Tempane

Population (2021)
  - Total: 86,993
- Time zone: UTC+0 (GMT)
- ISO 3166 code: GH-UE-TP

Tempane District is one of the fifteen districts in Upper East Region, Ghana. Originally it was formerly part of the then-larger Garu-Tempane District in 2004, until the southeast part of the district was split off to create Tempane District on 15 February 2018; thus the remaining part has been renamed as Garu District. The district assembly is located in the eastern part of Upper East Region and has Tempane as its capital town.

Like many districts in the Upper East Region, agriculture likely plays a significant role in the local economy. Many residents are engaged in subsistence farming and petty trading.

Tempane Senior High School and Sanity Senior High school are located in the district

The predominant local language spoken in Garu is Kusaal, which is common in that part of Ghana.

The district experiences a tropical savanna climate, typical of northern Ghana, with a single rainy season followed by a long dry season.

Their member of parliament is Hon. Lydia Lamisi Akanvariba.

== Sources ==
- "Districts of Ghana". Statoids.
