= Akuka Albert Alalzuuga =

Ghanaian politician

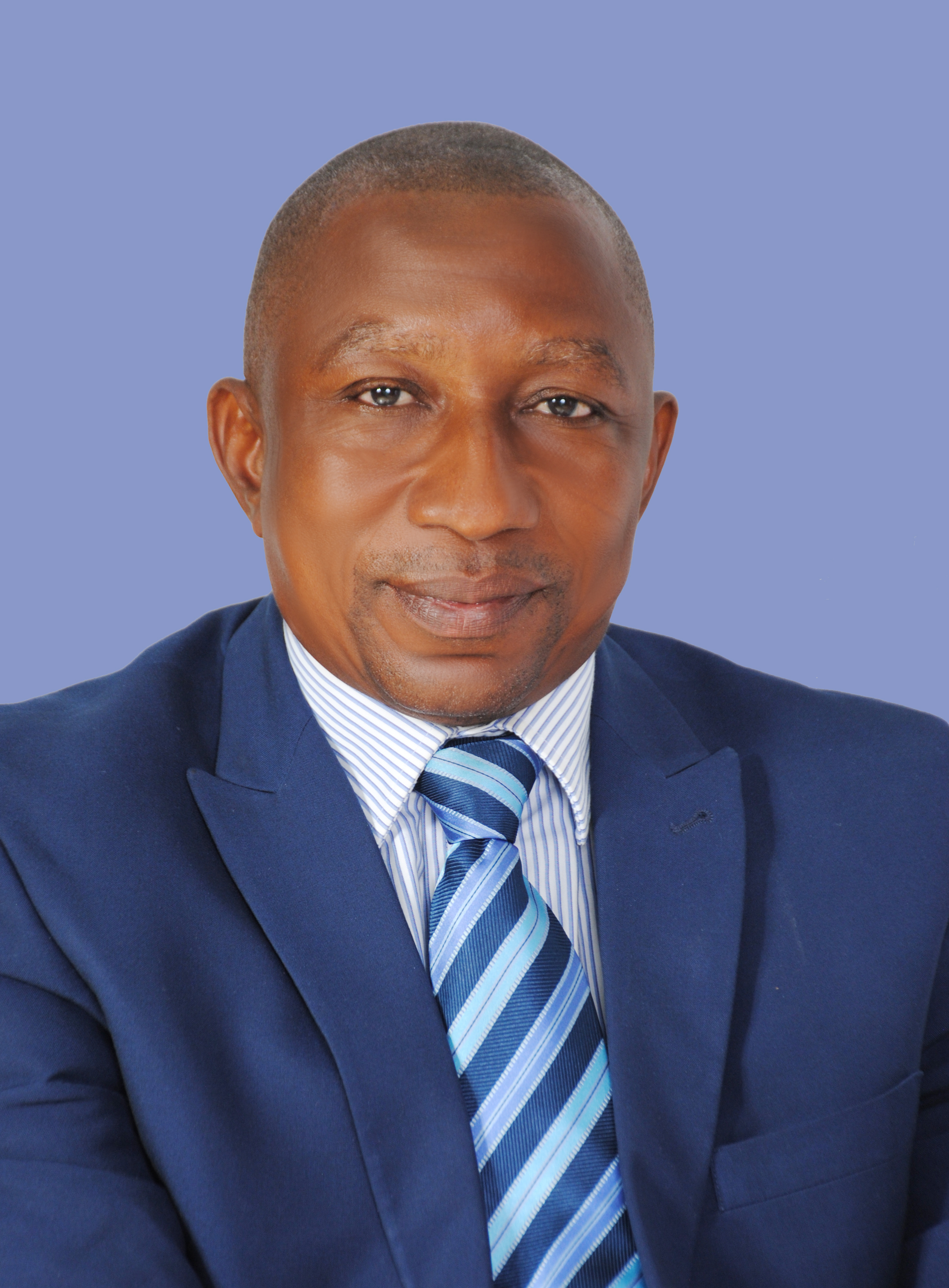

Member of the Ghana Parliament for Garu constituency

Personal details
- Born: 28 February 1968 (age 58)
- Party: National Democratic Congress

Akuka Albert Alalzuuga is a Ghanaian politician and member of the Seventh Parliament of the Fourth Republic of Ghana representing the Garu Constituency in the Upper East Region on the ticket of the National Democratic Congress (NDC).

== Early life and education ==
Akuka Albert Alalzuuga was born on 28 February 1968. He hold a BSC in Commerce from the University of Cape Coast and an HND in Accounting from the Tamale Polytechnic.

== Religion ==
Akuka is a Christian.
