= Sunyani Senior High School =

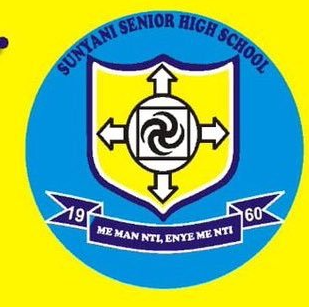

Location
- P. O. Box 156; Sunyani; Bono Region; Sunyani, Ghana; Ghana

Information
- School type: Public High School Coeducational
- Motto: Me Man Nti Enye Me Nti (We live not for ourselves only, but for our country also.)
- Established: 30 January 1958
- Status: Active
- Oversight: Ministry of Education
- Principal: Michael Nsiah-Agyapong
- Grades: 10-12
- Gender: Mixed school (Boys & Girls)
- Age: 14 to 18
- Classes offered: Home Economics, General Science, General Arts, Business, Visual Arts, Agric Science
- Houses: 8(four each for girls and boys)
- Colour: Blue
- Song: We Sing Rejoice, Proclaim
- Athletics: Track and Field
- Sports: Soccer, Volleyball, Netball, Basketball
- Nickname: Asonomma
- Rival: St. James Seminary Senior High School and Twene Amanfo Senior and Technical High
- Website: www.susec.edu.gh

Sunyani Senior High School (SUSEC) is a coeducational second cycle institution in Sunyani in the Bono Region of Ghana.

== History ==
Sunyani Secondary School popularly known as SUSEC is one of the products of Ghana Education Trust. It was established in 1960 by Prime Minister Kwame Nkrumah, later Ghana's first President.

The first batch of 36 students, 31 boys and 5 girls, was admitted on 30 October 1960.

On 13 December 1960, Osagyefo Kwame Nkrumah inaugurated the school, which started with only three(3) teachers and nine non-teaching staff.

Sunyani Secondary School started as a co-educational Institution but after a short time, it was decided to make it a boys' school, and the few girls in the school were sent to Yaa Asantewaa Girls' School, but this was reversed the following year and girls were again admitted.

The first Headmaster of the school was P.D. Quartey from 1960 to 1967 for a period of Seven (7) years.

Currently, Mr. Gordon Osei Marfo is the headmaster of the school.

== School symbol ==
The school's emblem, an elephant, was selected because the name Sunyani is a distorted variant of the name "Ason Dwaee", signifying the location where the legendary hunter and warrior Nana Boahen Korkor, the creator of the Sunyani traditional territory, killed and skinned elephants.

Nkrumah said in Latin that "A man was born not for himself alone but for his country," which inspired the motto "Me man nti enye me nti", which was originally used by the first Headmaster.

The school grew over the years. The number of non-teaching employees increased from nine (9) to one hundred and five (105), while the number of teaching employees has increased from four (4) to one hundred and ninety-eight (198). Four thousand four hundred and thirty-seven (4437) students now make up the student body.

The following figures show the number of students who have passed out of Sunyani Secondary School. Among these are doctors, nurses, lawyers, parliamentarians, heads of institutions and departments, teachers, pastors, and businesspeople.

Ordinary Level – G.C.E. (‘O’ Level) Students - 4,213

Advanced Level – G.C.E (“A” Level) Students - 2,020

Senior High School Students - 11400

== Programs Offered ==
- General Science
- Agricultural Science
- General Arts
- Visual Arts
- Home Economics
- Business

== Notable alumni ==
- Ignatius Baffour-Awuah — Member of Parliament for Sunyani West Constituency and Minister for Employment
- Ernest Akobuor Debrah — Former Member of Parliament for Tano North Constituency

== Former headteachers ==
Headteachers	Tenure in office
Peter David Quartey	1960 — 1967
E. Obeng - Mensah	1967 — 1972
M. K. Atiemo	1972 — 1977
Thomas Akwasi Adae Owusu	1977 — 1980
M. K. Atigbor	1979 — 1986
Peter Owusu-Donkor	1987 — 1990
Berlinda S. Addo	1990 — 1996
David Osei –Wusu	1996 — 1997
Joseph Awuah	1997 — 2010
Georgina Boakye	2011 — 2017
Michael Nsiah-Agyapong	2017 — 2021
Gordon Osei Marfo	2022 — Date
