= Kwame Owusu Frimpong =

Ghanaian politician (born 1960)

Hon Kwame Owusu Frimpong

Member of the Ghana Parliament for Ahafo Ano North

Member of Parliament for Ahafo Ano North Constituency
- In office 7 January 2005 – 6 January 2009
- President: John Agyekum Kufour

Member of Parliament for Ahafo Ano North Constituency
- In office 7 January 2001 – 6 January 2005
- President: John Agyekum Kufour

Minister for Local Government and Rural Development
- President: John Agyekum Kufour

Personal details
- Born: 10 October 1960 (age 65)
- Party: New Patriotic Party
- Education: University of Ghana
- Profession: Revenue Officer

Kwame Owusu Frimpong is a Ghanaian politician. He was a member of parliament for the Ahafo Ano North constituency in the 4th parliament of the 4th republic.

== Early life and education ==
Frimpong was born on 10 October 1960. He had his tertiary education at the University of Ghana where he obtained a diploma in Statistics.

== Career ==
Prior to entering politics, Frimpong was a Revenue Officer.

== Politics ==
Frimpong is a member of the New Patriotic Party. He was a member of parliament for the Ahafo Ano North constituency for two parliamentary terms: the 3rd parliament of the 4th republic of Ghana, and the 4th parliament of the 4th republic of Ghana. In his first term, he represented the constituency from 7 January 2001 to 6 January 2005 and for his second term in office, he represented the constituency from 7 January 2005 to 6 January 2009. During his tenure as a member of parliament, he was the chairperson of Ghana-China Parliamentary Friendship Association (GCPFA).

== Elections ==
In the year 2000, Frimpong won the general elections as the member of parliament for the Ahafo-Ano North constituency of the Ashanti Region of Ghana. He won on the ticket of the New Patriotic Party. His constituency was a part of the 31 parliamentary seats out of 33 seats won by the New Patriotic Party in that election for the Ashanti Region. The New Patriotic Party won a majority total of 99 parliamentary seats out of 200 seats. He was elected with 12,432 votes out of 24,420 total valid votes cast. This was equivalent to 52% of the total valid votes cast. He was elected over Annor Baffour of the National Democratic Congress, Johnson O. Antoh of the People's National Convention and Paul K. A. Mono of the Convention People's Party. These won 10,784, 515 and 174 votes out of the total valid votes cast respectively. These were equivalent to 45.1%, 2.2% and 0.7% respectively of total valid votes cast.

Frimpong was elected as the member of parliament for the Ahafo Ano North constituency of the Ashanti Region of Ghana one more time in the 2004 Ghanaian general elections. He won on the ticket of the New Patriotic Party. His constituency was a part of the 36 parliamentary seats out of 39 seats won by the New Patriotic Party in that election for the Ashanti Region. The New Patriotic Party won a majority total of 128 parliamentary seats out of 230 seats. He was elected with 15,045 votes out of 28,469 total valid votes cast. This was equivalent to 52.8% of total valid votes cast. He was elected over Atta Sampson of the Peoples’ National Convention, Addai-Amankwah David K. of the National Democratic Congress, Tabi John of the Convention People's Party and Adu Gyamfi Emmanuel of the Democratic People's Party. These obtained 220, 12,789, 222 and 193 votes respectively of total votes cast. These were equivalent to 0.8%, 44.9%, 0.8% and 0.7% respectively of total valid votes cast.

== Personal life ==
Frimpong is a Christian.
