= Joseph Dindiok Kpemka =

Ghanaian politician (born 1973)

Member of the Ghana Parliament for Tempane Constituency

Personal details
- Born: 13 August 1973 (age 53) kpikpira-Tempane, Ghana
- Party: New Patriotic Party
- Education: University of Ghana; Ghana School of Law

Joseph Dindiok Kpemka (born 13 August 1973) is a Ghanaian politician and was a member of the Seventh Parliament of the Fourth Republic of Ghana, representing the Tempane constituency in the Upper East Region, on the ticket of the New Patriotic Party.

== Education ==
Born on 13 August 1973, Kpemka holds a Bachelor of Arts degree in English and Bacher of law from the University of Ghana and Barrister at law from the Ghana School of Law.

== Career ==
He taught English at the Ghana Education Service from 2002 to 2005. From 2008 to 2009, he served as a District Chief Executive for Garu Tempane District. He became a lawyer and lectured at the Bolgatanga Technical University from 2009 to 2016. He was Ghana's Deputy Attorney General and Minister of Justice from 2017 to 2021. In May 2024, Kpemka was appointed by Nana Akufo-Addo to serve as Deputy Managing Director for Bulk Oil Storage and Transportation Company Limited(BOST).

== Politics ==
Kpemka is a member of the New Patriotic Party and was the member of parliament for Tempane( Ghana parliament constituency) in the Upper Region.

=== 2016 election ===
He contested for Member of Parliament in the 2016 Ghanaian general election and won with 13,363 votes representing 45.42%. He won the election over David Adakudugu of the National Democratic Congress, Francis Adam Asaanah (IND), Laar Samson Kangben of the PPP and Ayaaba Samson Asaman of the Convention People's Party. They obtained 10,697 votes, 2,925 votes, 2,306 votes and 132 votes respectively, equivalent to 36.36%, 9.94%, 7.84%, and 0.45% of the total votes respectively. By his victory, he became the first person on the ticket of the NPP to win the Tempane Parliamentary seat.

==== 2020 election ====
During the 2020 Ghanaian general election, he failed to retain his seat against the opposition party parliamentary candidate Miss Lydia Akanvariba Lamisi of the National Democratic Congress (NDC). He polled 16,462 votes against 20,939 votes for the NDC candidate.

== Personal life ==
He is a Christian.
