= Worikambo =

Town in Upper East region of Ghana

- Country: Ghana
- Region: Upper East region

Worikambo is a town in the Garu-Tempane district in the Upper East region of Ghana.

== Facilities ==
- Worikambo Health Center
- Worikambo Catholic Junior High School
- Worikambo Primary School

== Notable natives ==
- Suleman Adamu Sanid
- Idana Asigri
