= Eric Nana Agyemang-Prempeh =

Ghanaian politician

Hon. Eric Nana Agyemang-Prempeh MP

Member of Parliament for Ahafo Ano North
- Incumbent
- Assumed office 7 January 2025
- Preceded by: Suleman Adamu Sanid
- President: John Mahama
- Vice President: Jane Naana Opoku-Agyemang

Personal details
- Born: 5 March 1974 (age 52) Tepa
- Party: New Patriotic Party
- Education: University of Wrexham
- Occupation: Politician
- Committees: Defence & Interior Committee; House

Eric Nana Agyemang‑Prempeh (born, March 5, 1974) is a Ghanaian politician and Member of Parliament for the Ahafo Ano North constituency in the Ashanti Region. He represents the New Patriotic Party (NPP) in the Ninth Parliament of the Fourth Republic of Ghana.

== Early life and education ==
Agyemang‑Prempeh was born in Tepa, Ashanti Region. He earned a Master of Business Administration (MBA) from the University of Wrexham.

== Career ==
Before entering parliament, he served as the District Chief Executive for the Ahafo Ano North District and subsequently became the Director‑General of NADMO

=== Politics ===
Agyemang‑Prempeh contested and won the Ahafo Ano North seat in the December 7, 2024 general election. Following a High Court‑ordered re-collation on December 21, 2024, he was declared winner with 20,353 votes, defeating NDC’s Kwasi Adusei, who had 20,232 votes, out of 40,585 valid votes. He was sworn in as MP in January 2025 and currently serves on the Defence & Interior Committee and the House Committee in Parliament
