= Kwasi Ameyaw-Cheremeh =

Ghanaian politician

Hon. Kwasi Ameyaw-Cheremeh
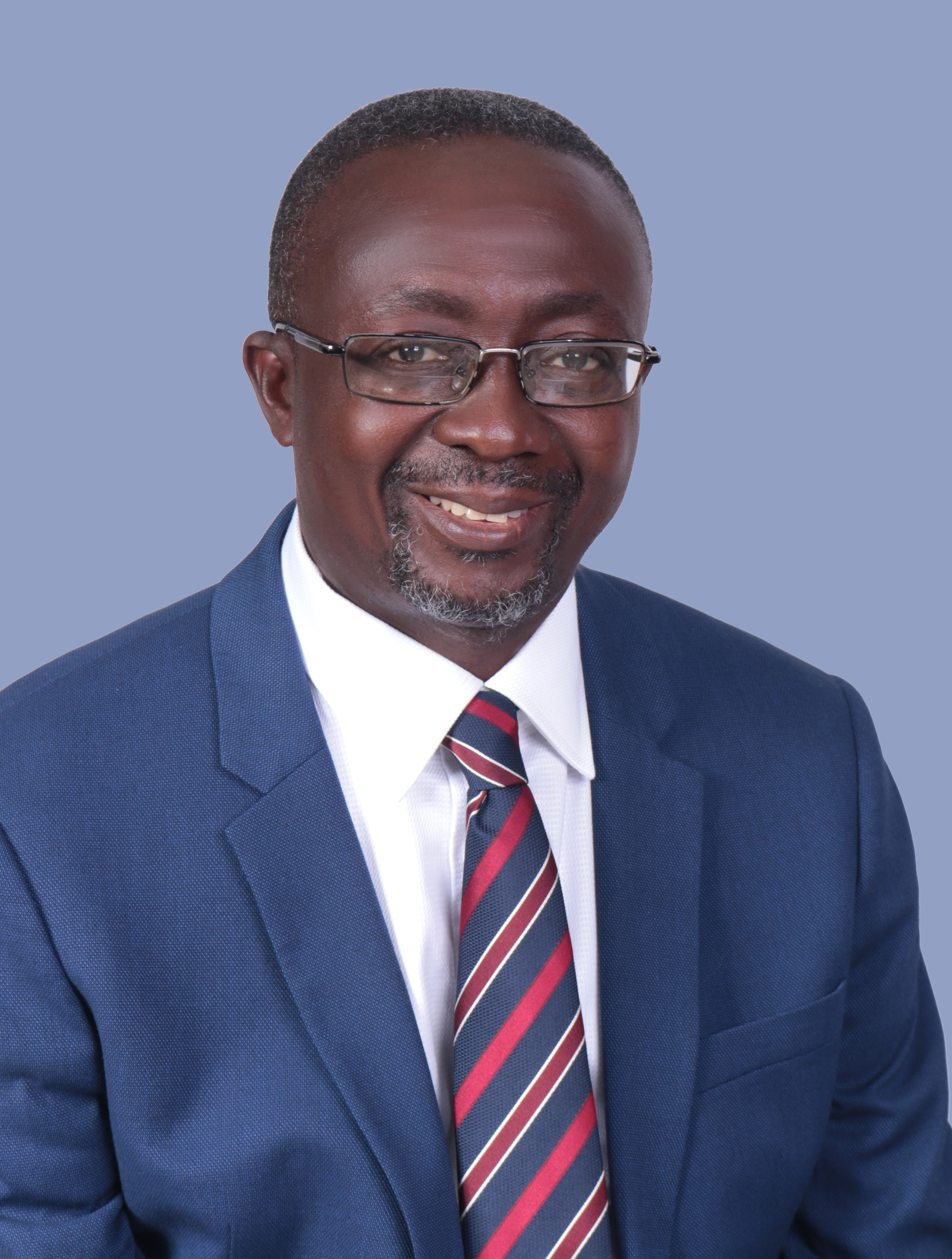

Member of Parliament for Sunyani East
- Incumbent
- Assumed office 7 January 2009
- Preceded by: Joseph Henry Mensah

Personal details
- Born: Kwasi Ameyaw-Cheremeh; 6 November 1966 (age 59) Jinijini, Ghana
- Party: New Patriotic Party
- Occupation: Politician
- Profession: Lawyer/Lecturer
- Committees: Judiciary Committee (Chairperson); Standing Orders Committee; Constitutional, Legal and Parliamentary Affairs Committee; Education Committee

Kwasi Ameyaw-Cheremeh (born November 6, 1966) is a Ghanaian politician and was the member of parliament for the Sunyani East constituency in the 5th, 6th, 7th and 8th parliament of the 4th republic. In February 2024, he was nominated as the presiding speaker of the Parliament of Ghana.

== Early life and education ==
Ameyaw-Cheremeh was born on November 6, 1966. He hails from Jinijini, a town in the Brong Ahafo Region of Ghana. He entered the University of Ghana and obtained his Master of Philosophy degree in public administration in 2008. He also attended Ghana School of Law and obtained his Bachelor of Laws in 1995. He has also attended the Galilee College in Israel and graduated with the 2008 class.

== Career ==
Ameyaw-Cheremeh is currently serving as the board chairman of Bui Power Authority. He served as the general secretary at the National Association of Local Authorities of Ghana (NALAG). He is a lawyer by profession.

== Politics ==
Ameyaw-Cheremeh is a member of the New Patriotic Party (NPP). He was elected in the 2008 Ghanaian general elections as the member of parliament for the Sunyani East constituency for the 5th parliament of the 4th republic of Ghana. He obtained 33,765 votes of 53,844 total valid votes cast, equivalent to 62.71% of total valid votes cast. He was elected over Alanyina Sampana Sampson of the People's National Convention, Justice Samuel Adjei of the National Democratic Congress, Peter Kwaw Alibah of the Democratic Freedom Party and Kwakye Kofi of the Convention People's Party. These obtained 1.25%, 34.97%, 0.29% and 0.78% respectively of all total valid votes cast. In 2012, he contested again for the Sunyani East constituency seat on the ticket of the NPP for the sixth parliament of the fourth republic and won. He served in the Parliament of Ghana for Sunyani East constituency and as the house majority chief whip. As a New Patriotic Party (NPP) member, he obtained 42,478 votes out of the 71,918 valid votes cast representing 59.06% of the total votes cast in the 2012 Ghanaian general elections.

== 2024 elections ==
The 2024 parliamentary election in the Sunyani East Constituency marked a significant political shift as the incumbent New Patriotic Party (NPP) Member of Parliament (MP), Kwasi Ameyaw-Cheremeh, lost his seat to Seid Mubarak of the National Democratic Congress (NDC). Mubarak secured 34,453 votes, defeating Ameyaw-Cheremeh, who garnered 22,306 votes. Other candidates in the race included Independent aspirant Ransford Antwi, who polled 8,294 votes, and Sampson Alannyina Sampana of the People's National Convention (PNC), who obtained 222 votes.

=== Committees ===
Ameyaw-Cheremeh was the chairperson for the Judiciary Committee; a member of the Standing Orders Committee; a member of the Constitutional, Legal and Parliamentary Affairs Committee; and a member of the Education Committee.

== Personal life ==
Ameyaw-Cheremeh is a Christian. He is married, and has four children.
