= Richard Akuoko Adiyiah =

Ghanaian politician (1955–2022)

Richard Akuoko Adiyiah (20 February 1955 – 30 September 2022) was a Ghanaian politician. He was a member of parliament of the 5th parliament of the 4th republic.

== Early life and education ==
Adiyiah was born on 20 February 1955. He hailed from Dwaaho in the Ashanti Region, Ghana. He had his secondary education at Opoku Ware School and also held a master's degree in Public Administration from Kennedy School of Government of Harvard University. He also attended Yale School of Management in New Haven.

== Career ==
Adiyiah was a Finance Officer. He was the Chief Finance Officer of the United Nations Observer Mission in Georgia (UNOMIG). He later served as Financial Controller of GIHOC Distilleries Company Limited. He was appointed chief executive officer of Produce Buying Company.

== Politics ==
Adiyiah was a member of the New Patriotic Party. In December 2008, he contested the 2008 Ghanaian general election and won. He won the Ahafo Ano North seat by polling 16,080 votes out of a total of 31,196 votes. He was a member of parliament for the Ahafo Ano North seat from 2008 to 2012.

== Personal life and death ==
Adiyiah was married with four children. He was a Christian and a member of Light House Church International.

Adiyiah died at his residence on 30 September 2022, at the age of 67.
