= Abesim =

Place in Bono Region, Ghana

- Village
- Location within Ghana
- Coordinates: 7°22′00″N 2°22′00″W
- Country: Ghana
- Region: Bono Region
- District: Sunyani Municipal District
- Elevation: 932 ft (284 m)
- Time zone: GMT
  - Summer (DST): GMT

Abesim is a town in Sunyani Municipal District in the Bono Region of Ghana. Abesim is very close to the regional capital town of the Bono Region, Sunyani. Abesim is known for the St. James Seminary and Secondary School. It is also known for the Olistar Senior High School and Abesim Senior High School. The school is a second cycle institution. Abesim has clinics like St. James Clinic, Lars Medical center, Hope for children and aged rehab.center.
