= University of Energy and Natural Resources =

Public university in Ghana

- Motto: Knowledge, Integrity, Impact
- Type: Public
- Established: December 31, 2011; 14 years ago
- Chairman: George Kankam
- Vice-Chancellor: Elvis Asare-Bediako hisco
- Location: Sunyani, Bono Region, Ghana; 7.34949°N 2.343501°W
- Campus: Suburban area
- Colours: Blue, white, burgundy, green and yellow
- Website: www.uenr.edu.gh

The University of Energy and Natural Resources (UENR; French: Université de l'énergie et des ressources naturelles) is a public-funded university in Ghana, that was established by an Act of the Parliament of Ghana, Act 830, 2011 on December 31, 2011. The university is a public funded national institution which seeks to provide leadership and management of energy and natural resources and be a centre of excellence in these critical areas. The university approaches its programmes and research emphasizing interdisciplinary collaboration and taking into account, areas such as economics, law and policy, management, science, technology and engineering as well as social and political issues affecting energy and natural resources.

Prior to the passing of the bill establishing the university into law, the then President, J. E. A Mills set up a National Task Force Planning Committee on January 8, 2010, with the mandate to develop, organize and supervise the implementation of the programme for the establishment of the two new Universities at Volta and Brong Ahafo (Now Bono) Regions. The 24-member Task Force was chaired by Samuel Kofi Sefah-Dedeh, a former Dean of the Faculty of Engineering Services, University of Ghana with Christine Amoako-Nuamah of the Office of the President, Osu Castle as the convener. Following the recommendations of the committee, the former president, J.E.A Mills cut the sod for the commencement of the University at Sunyani on February 8, 2011. The Kwame Nkrumah University of Science and Technology also handed over its campus of Faculty of Forest Resources Technology to the UENR at a colorful ceremony at Sunyani on June 7, 2012. When fully operational, the university would have seven schools. These are:

- School of Engineering;
- School of Energy;
- School of Sciences;
- School of Geosciences;
- School of Agriculture and Technology;
- School of Natural Resources;
- School of Graduate Studies;
- School of Management Sciences and Law; and
- School of Mines and Built Environment

The university is a multi campus set-up and currently has three campuses located in Sunyani, Nsoatre and Dormaa Ahenkro. The Sunyani campus which is approximately 85 acres (34 ha) is home to the School of Sciences; School of Natural Resources; School of Engineering; School of Energy; School of Graduate Studies and the Main Administration of the university as well as the University Library.

The School of Engineering could also be located at the Nsoatre campus which is approximately 2,000 acres. The School of Agriculture and Technology and Geosciences is also situated on approximately 2000 acres of land at the Dormaa campus. The university would also have four field training stations in Mim, Bronsankoro and Kyeraa for the Agriculture and Forest Resources Management students and one at Bui for Engineering students. The university hopes to become a centre of excellence for the training of scientists and technologists for Ghana and beyond.

== See also ==
- List of universities in Ghana
