= Garu (Ghana parliament constituency) =

Ghana parliament constituency

- constituency for the Parliament of Ghana
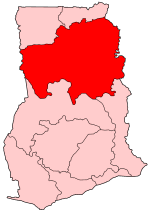
- District: Garu-Tempane District
- Region: Upper East Region of Ghana

Current constituency
- Party: National Democratic Congress
- MP: ALBERT AKUKA ALALZUUGA

Garu is one of the constituencies represented in the Parliament of Ghana. It elects one Member of Parliament (MP) by the first past the post system of election. The Garu constituency is located in the Garu-Tempane District of the Upper East Region of Ghana.

== Boundaries ==
The seat is located entirely within the Garu-Tempane District of the Upper East Region of Ghana.

== Members of Parliament ==
Election	Member	Party
2016	ALBERT AKUKA ALALZUUGA	NDC

Ghanaian parliamentary election, 2016 : Garu Source:Peacefmonline
Party	Candidates	Votes	%
NDC	ALBERT AKUKA ALALZUUGA	12,809	53.59
NPP	SMARI ALHASSAN	10,856	45.42
NDP	ALHASSAN A. RAHMAN	92	0.38
IND	YAKUBU PANDAM PETER	53	0.22
CPP	USSIF SHAKA NAMBE	48	0.20
APC	SAMARI SAEED BABA	42	0.18

== See also ==
- List of Ghana Parliament constituencies
- List of political parties in Ghana
