= Yamo =

Yamo has multiple meanings.

- Yamo, a musical project by Wolfgang Flür and Mouse on Mars
- The Green Yamo, an enemy character in the computer game Bruce Lee
