= Garu, Ghana =

Garu
- District Capital
- Location of Garu in Upper East region
- Coordinates: 10°51′N 0°10′W
- Country: Ghana
- Region: Upper East Region
- District: Garu-Tempane District

Population (2013)
  - Total: —
- Time zone: GMT
  - Summer (DST): GMT

Garu is a town and is the administrative capital of Garu District, a district in the Upper East Region of northern Ghana.

Garu is the only town in Ghana which is bordered by two countries: Republic of Togo to the east and Burkina Faso to the north. To the south by East Mamprusi District and to the west by Bawku Municipal.

Hon. Albert Akuka Alalzuuga is the current member of Parliament in the Garu constituency under the ticket of the NDC.

Garu Presbyterian Agricultural Station was established in 1967 by the Presbyterian Church of Ghana (PCG) and is working to improve the living standards of the people in the area.
