= Ahafo Ano North (Ghana parliament constituency) =

Constituency in the Ashanti Region of Ghana

- constituency for the Parliament of Ghana
- District: Ahafo Ano North District
- Region: Ashanti Region of Ghana

Current constituency
- Party: New Patriotic Party
- MP: Eric Nana Agyemang-Prempeh

Ahafo Ano North is one of the constituencies represented in the Parliament of Ghana. It elects one Member of Parliament (MP) by the first past the post system of election. Eric Nana Agyemang-Prempeh is the member of parliament for the constituency. Ahafo Ano North is located in the Ahafo Ano North district of the Ashanti Region of Ghana.

== Boundaries ==
The seat is located within the Ahafo Ano North District of the Ashanti Region of Ghana.

== Members of Parliament ==
Election	Member	Party	Ref
1992	George Kwasi Adjei Annim	EGLE	
1996	Baffour Annor	National Democratic Congress	
2000	Kwame Owusu Frimpong	New Patriotic Party	
2008	Richard Akuoko Adiyiah	New Patriotic Party	
2012	Akwasi Adusei	National Democratic Congress	
2016	Suleman Adamu Sanid	New Patriotic Party	

== Elections ==
2008 Ghanaian parliamentary election: Ahafo Ano North Source: Ghana Home Page
Party	Candidate	Votes	%	±%
New Patriotic Party	Richard Akuoko Adiyiah	16,029	51.5	
National Democratic Congress	D.K. Addai-Amankwah	14,641	47.0	
People's National Convention	Attah Sampson	335	1.1	
Convention People's Party	Joseph Akpabli	116	0.4	
Majority		1,388	4.5	

== See also ==
- List of Ghana Parliament constituencies
