= Tempane =

- Interactive map of Tempane
- Country: Ghana
- Region: Upper East Region
- District: Tempane District

Tempane is a town and capital of Tempane District in the Upper East Region of Ghana. The town is known for the Garu Tempane Secondary School. The school is a second cycle institution.

Tempane District is one of the fifteen districts in the Upper East Region. It was previously part of the then-larger Garu-Tempane District until the southeast part of the district was separated to form the Tempane District on 15 February 2018; the district assembly is located in the eastern part of the Upper East Region, with Tempane as its capital town. The majority of people in Tempane are farmers and peasant traders, with only a few government employees. To the east, the community is bordered by the Republic of Togo
