= Baffour Annor =

Ghanaian politician

Hon Baffour Annor

Member of parliament for Ahofo Ano North Constituency
- In office 7 January 1997 – 6 January 2001
- President: John Jerry Rawlings

Personal details
- Born: Ahofo Ano North, Ashanti Region, Ghana
- Party: National Democratic Congress
- Occupation: Politician

Baffour Annor is a Ghanaian politician and a member of the Second Parliament of the Fourth Republic representing the Ahafo Ano North Constituency in the Ashanti Region of Ghana.

== Early life ==
Annor was born in Ahafo Ano in the Ashanti Region of Ghana.

== Politics ==
Annor was first elected into parliament on the ticket of the National Democratic Congress during the 1996 Ghanaian General Elections for the Ahafo Ano North Constituency in the Ashanti Region of Ghana. He polled 12,536 votes out of the 22,519 valid votes cast representing 45.70% over his opponents James Brown Ford Donkor of the New Patriotic Party who polled 9,628 votes representing 35.10% and Kwabena Nketia of the People's National Congress who polled 355 votes representing 1.30%. During the 2000 Ghanaian general election, he was defeated by Kwame Owusu Frimpong of the New Patriotic Party who polled 12,432 votes out of the 23,905 valid votes cast representing 52.00% over Baffour Annor of the National Democratic Congress who polled 10,784 votes representing 45.10%, Johnson O.Antoh of the People's National Congress who polled 515 votes representing 2.20% and Paul K. A. Mono of the Convention People's Party who polled 174 votes representing 0.70 votes.
