= George Atta-Boateng =

Ghanaian ICT specialist and public administrator

Dr. George Atta-Boateng

Acting Director-General of the National Signals Bureau
- Incumbent
- Assumed office 17 February 2025
- President: John Dramani Mahama
- Preceded by: Kwabena Adu-Boahene

Director-General of the National Information Technology Agency
- In office 2015–2017
- Preceded by: William Tevie
- Succeeded by: Richard Okyere-Fosu

Personal details
- Citizenship: Ghanaian
- Education: Kwame Nkrumah University of Science and Technology; Fordham University
- Occupation: ICT specialist; public administrator

George Atta-Boateng is a Ghanaian information and communication technology (ICT) specialist and public administrator. He has held senior leadership positions in Ghana's digital governance institutions, including as Director-General of the National Information Technology Agency (NITA) from 2015 to 2017 and as Acting Director-General of the National Signals Bureau (NSB) since February 2025.

== Early life and education ==
Atta-Boateng attended St. James Seminary and Senior High School in Sunyani, in Ghana's Bono Region.

He studied at Fordham University in New York, earning a Bachelor of Science in computer science, a Master of Science in computer science, and an Advanced Certificate in Financial Economics & Data Analysis. He later completed a Doctor of Philosophy (PhD) in Computer Engineering at the Kwame Nkrumah University of Science and Technology (KNUST).

== Career ==
=== National Information Technology Agency ===
Atta-Boateng was appointed Director-General of the National Information Technology Agency (NITA) in 2015, succeeding William Tevie. NITA is the government agency responsible for implementing national IT policy and coordinating Ghana's digital infrastructure development.

During his tenure, Atta-Boateng managed high-profile national ICT programs, including the Schools Computerization Project and the extension of the National Eastern Corridor Fibre Network, and led NITA in its policy and strategy implementation. His work covered areas such as cybersecurity, telecommunications infrastructure, and the use of ICT in health, business, government, and education. Atta-Boateng had more than 18 years of experience in ICT by the time of his NSB appointment.

He served in the role until 2017, when he was succeeded by Richard Okyere-Fosu.

=== National Signals Bureau ===
On 17 February 2025, President John Dramani Mahama appointed Atta-Boateng as Acting Director-General of the National Signals Bureau, an agency under Ghana's National Security Council responsible for secure communications and signals intelligence. He succeeded Kwabena Adu-Boahene in the role.

Under his leadership at NSB, the bureau expanded its monitoring and response capacity against misinformation and disinformation, publicly warning social media users against spreading harmful content that could threaten public order.

=== National Communications Authority ===
In October 2025, Atta-Boateng was inaugurated as a member of the governing board of the National Communications Authority, the statutory regulator for Ghana's telecommunications and broadcasting sectors.

Government offices
Preceded by William Tevie	Director-General of the National Information Technology Agency; 2015–2017	Succeeded by Richard Okyere-Fosu
Preceded by Kwabena Adu-Boahene	Acting Director-General of the National Signals Bureau; 2025–present	Incumbent
