= David Adakudugu =

Ghanaian politician (1968–2019)

Hon. David Adakudugu

Personal details
- Born: October 23, 1968
- Died: September 19, 2019 (aged 50) Tamale Teaching Hospital
- Party: National Democratic Congress
- Spouse: Akanvariva Lydia Lamisi

David Adakudugu (October 23, 1968 – September 19, 2019) was a Ghanaian politician and member of the Sixth Parliament of the Fourth Republic of Ghana representing the Tempane (New) Constituency in the Upper East Region on the ticket of the National Democratic Congress.

== Personal life ==
Adakudugu was a Christian (Assemblies of God Church). He was married to Akanvariva Lydia Lamisi with five children.

== Early life and education ==
Adakudugu was born on October 23, 1968. He hails from Basyonde, a town in the Upper East Region of Ghana. He entered Methodist University, Accra and obtained his bachelor's degree in marketing.

== Politics ==
Adakudugu was a member of the National Democratic Congress (NDC). In 2012, he contested for the Tempane (New) seat on the ticket of the NDC sixth parliament of the fourth republic and won.

== Employment ==
- Managing Director, Noryini Commercial Limited, Kasoa (2005–2009)
- District Chief Executive, Garu-Tempane Director (April, 2009–January, 2013)

== Death ==
Adakudugu died on the 19th of September, 2019 at the Tamale Teaching Hospital after a short illness, he was laid to rest at Basyonde at his native village in the Kusaug traditional area.
