= Sunyani Municipal District =

Sunyani Municipal District District Municipal de Sunyani
- Municipal District
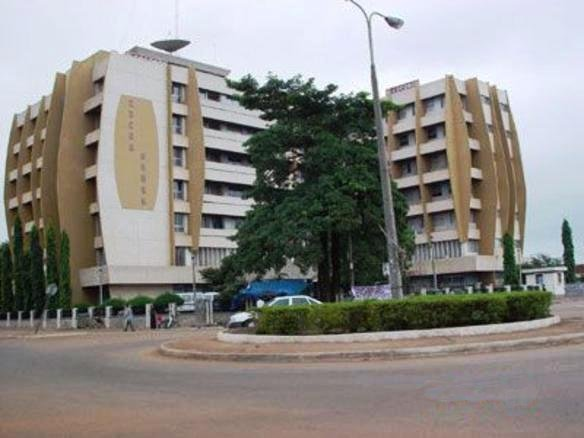
- The Sunyani Cocoa House

- Seal

- Districts of Bono Region

- Location of Sunyani Municipal District within Bono Region
- Coordinates: 07°19′58″N 02°19′41″W
- Country: Ghana
- Region: Bono Region
- Capital: Sunyani

Government
  - Municipal Chief Executive: Kwasi Oppong Ababio

Area
  - Total: 1,289 km^{2} (498 sq mi)

Population (2021)
  - Total: 193,595
- Time zone: UTC+0 (GMT)

Sunyani Municipal District is one of the twelve districts in Bono Region, Ghana. Originally created as an ordinary district assembly on 10 March 1989 when it was known as Sunyani District, until the northwest part of the district was split off to create Sunyani West District on 1 November 2007 (effectively 29 February 2008); thus the remaining part has been retained as Sunyani District, which it was later elevated to municipal district assembly status and has been renamed as Sunyani Municipal District on that same year. The municipality is located in the western part of Bono Region and has Sunyani as its capital town.

== List of settlements ==
Settlements of Sunyani Municipal District
No.	Settlement	Population	Population year
1	Abesim		
2	Adantia		
3	Ahyiayem		
4	Asuakwaa Kotokrom		
5	Atronie		
6	Chiraa		
7	Dumasua		
8	Fiapre		
9	Kobedi		
10	Kwatire		
11	New Dormaa		
12	Nsuatre		
13	Nwawansua		
14	Odomase		
15	S. Liberation Barracks		
16	Sunyani	87,642	2012
17	Tanom		
18	Yawhimakrom		

== Sources ==
- "Sunyani Municipal District". Statoids.
- District: Sunyani Municipal District
