= Sunyani =

City in Bono Region, Ghana

- City
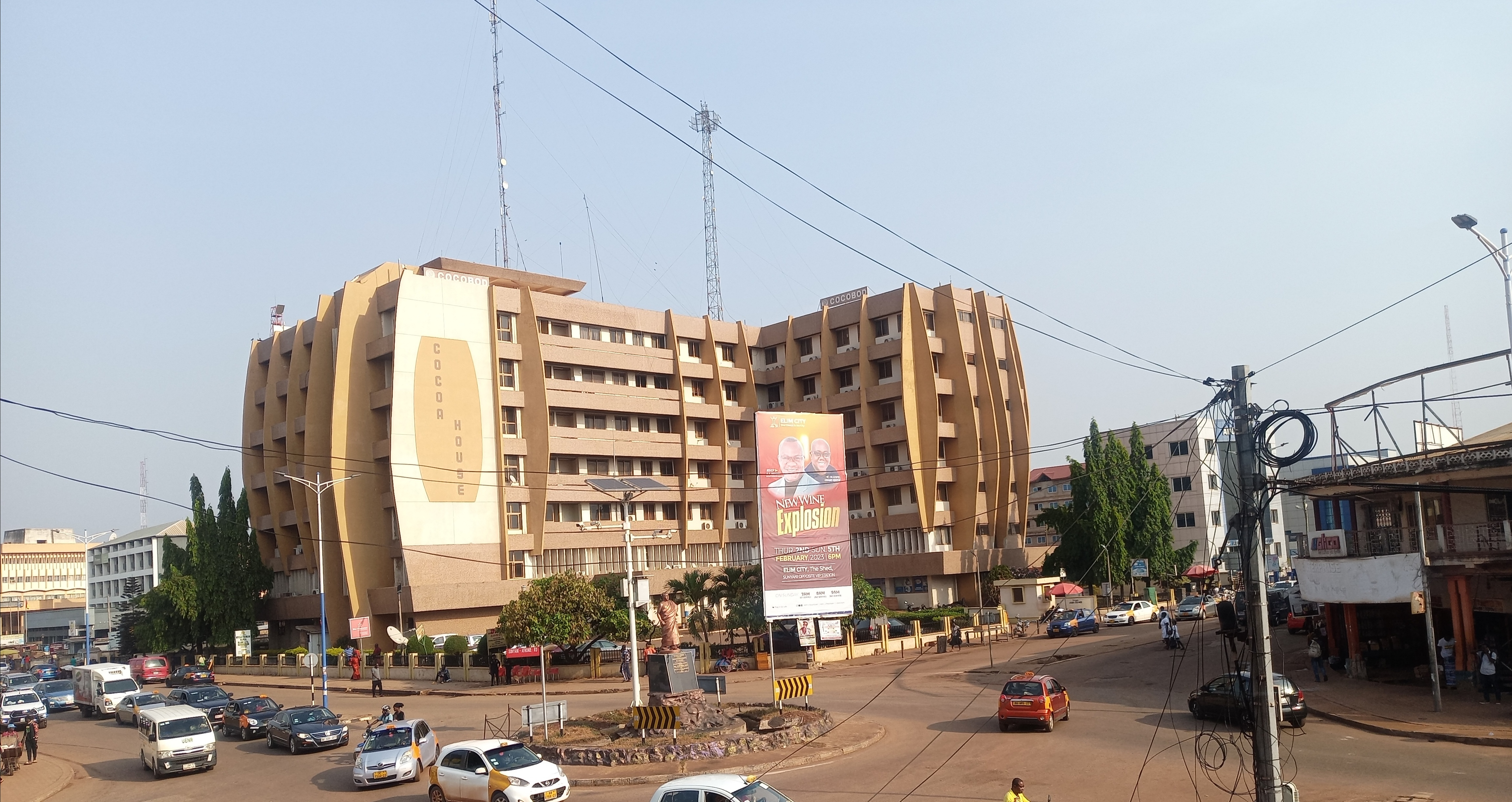
- The Cocoa House in the centre of Sunyani
- Etymology: Akan: Osono ("elephant")
- Nickname: Sun city
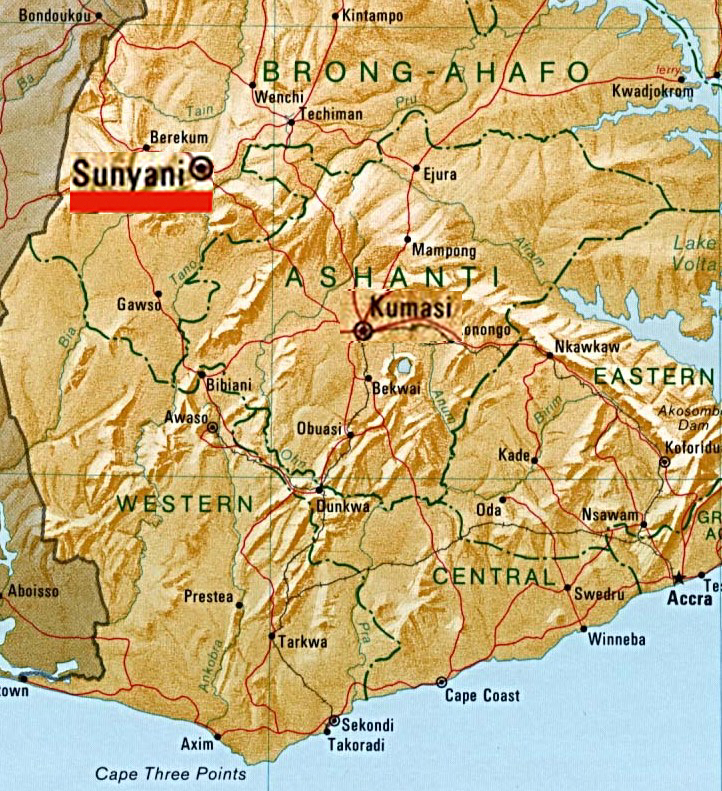
- Detailed map showcasing the location of Sunyani in Bono, Ghana (1995)

- Location in Sunyani in Bono, Ghana Sunyani (Africa)
- Coordinates: 7°20′N 2°20′W
- Country: Ghana
- Region: Bono
- District: Sunyani Municipal District

Government
  - Type: Mayor–council
  - Municipal mayor: Hon. Ansu Kumi
- Elevation: 308 m (1,010 ft)

Population (2010)
  - Total: 75,366
  - Ethnicities: Akan; Northerner; Ewe; Ga-Adangbe
  - Religion: Christianity; Islam; traditional African religions
- Time zone: GMT
  - Summer (DST): GMT
- Postal codes: BS0000 – BS2103
- Area code: 035
- Climate: Aw
- Website: sma.gov.gh

Sunyani (/sʌˈŋjəˈeɪ/) is a city and the capital of the Sunyani Municipal District and the Bono Region of Ghana. The city is located about 105 miles (169 km) northwest of Kumasi and 300 miles (480 km) from Accra. It is the sixth-largest city in the country as of the 2010 census, with a population of 75,366 people. Ethnic groups such as the Akan, Northerner, Ewe, and Ga-Adangbe resided in the city along with others. As of 2024, the mayor of the municipality was Ansu Kumi.

Sunyani's economy is largely agrarian, with the city known for its growing cocoa bean production. The city is home to the Roman Catholic Diocese of Sunyani which is under Bishop Matthew Kwasi Gyamfi. Sunyani is also home to many educational institutions, such as the Sunyani Technical University and the University of Energy and Natural Resources.

== Etymology ==
Sunyani is a corrupted form of the Akan word Sonnwae. Sunyani comes from the Akan word Osono, which means "elephant".

== History ==
Historically, Sunyani was a popular camping ground for elephant hunters during the late 19th century. In 1924, the British set up a district headquarters in the city and with the construction of a road between it and Kumasi, Sunyani became an economic hub.

== Geography ==
Sunyani is located at 07°20′N 02°20′W (7.333333, -2.333333), approximately 105 miles (169 km) southwest of Kumasi and 300 miles (480 km) away from Accra. The city have an average elevation of 308 metres (1,010 ft).

=== Municipality area ===
The city is located in the Sunyani Municipal District which covered a land area of 506.7 km^{2} (195.6 sq mi). The municipality bordered the Sunyani West District from the north, the Dormaa East District towards the west, the Asutifi North District from the south and the Tano North District towards the southeast.

=== Environmental Issues ===
Flood-prone areas in Sunyani

highly flood-prone areas - 21.32 %
flood-prone areas - 39.65 %
slightly flood-prone areas - 28.06 %
non flood-prone areas - 10.97 %

In cities all across Ghana, including Sunyani, increases in the risks of flooding hazards have placed a strain on existing drainage systems present in the settlements. According to findings from a 2024 study, it suggest that increased precipitation is the main culprit because urban areas situated on flat plains, such as Sunyani, with poor drainage systems are more prone to flooding. They also found that the rapid urbanization as a result of the increase in population is another cause in increase flood risks. Data on flood-prone areas in Sunyani are lackluster at best.

=== Climate ===
The city has a tropical savanna climate (Köppen climate classification Aw), experiencing both rainy and dry seasons retrospectively. Precipitation, on a monthly basis, is about 97.53 mm (0.3200 ft). The average monthly mean temperatures ranges around 31.24 °C (88.23 °F) while the average monthly minimum temperatures is around 21.46 °C (70.63 °F). The average monthly relative humidity is about 58.10%. Water bodies that flow through Sunyani are the Tano, Amoma, Kankam, Benu, Yaya and Bisi rivers. Sunyani is located within a moist forested zone, home to many different kinds of tree species. The city is also home to two major forest reserves: the Yaya forest reserve and the Amoma forest reserve.

Climate data for Sunyani (1991–2020)
Month	Jan	Feb	Mar	Apr	May	Jun	Jul	Aug	Sep	Oct	Nov	Dec	Year
Record high °C (°F)	38.3 (100.9)	38.8 (101.8)	39.3 (102.7)	37.0 (98.6)	36.4 (97.5)	34.7 (94.5)	32.2 (90.0)	34.8 (94.6)	33.5 (92.3)	33.1 (91.6)	35.0 (95.0)	35.5 (95.9)	39.3 (102.7)
Mean daily maximum °C (°F)	33.4 (92.1)	35.0 (95.0)	34.4 (93.9)	32.8 (91.0)	31.8 (89.2)	30.1 (86.2)	28.6 (83.5)	28.2 (82.8)	29.2 (84.6)	30.3 (86.5)	31.5 (88.7)	31.8 (89.2)	31.4 (88.5)
Daily mean °C (°F)	26.5 (79.7)	28.5 (83.3)	28.5 (83.3)	27.7 (81.9)	27.1 (80.8)	26.0 (78.8)	25.1 (77.2)	24.8 (76.6)	25.4 (77.7)	26.0 (78.8)	26.6 (79.9)	26.1 (79.0)	26.5 (79.7)
Mean daily minimum °C (°F)	19.7 (67.5)	21.9 (71.4)	22.7 (72.9)	22.6 (72.7)	22.4 (72.3)	21.9 (71.4)	21.6 (70.9)	21.3 (70.3)	21.6 (70.9)	21.6 (70.9)	21.8 (71.2)	20.5 (68.9)	21.6 (70.9)
Record low °C (°F)	11.1 (52.0)	15.4 (59.7)	16.1 (61.0)	19.1 (66.4)	18.9 (66.0)	18.5 (65.3)	18.0 (64.4)	17.3 (63.1)	18.5 (65.3)	17.3 (63.1)	16.5 (61.7)	13.0 (55.4)	11.1 (52.0)
Average precipitation mm (inches)	9.0 (0.35)	45.9 (1.81)	92.4 (3.64)	157.0 (6.18)	154.4 (6.08)	181.2 (7.13)	88.5 (3.48)	57.5 (2.26)	162.7 (6.41)	163.1 (6.42)	52.7 (2.07)	10.2 (0.40)	1,174.6 (46.24)
Average precipitation days (≥ 1.0 mm)	0.6	3.0	6.5	9.3	9.9	11.6	7.1	6.2	11.6	13.4	5.4	1.1	85.7
Source: NOAA

== Government ==
The municipality has a mayor–council form of government, the city of Sunyani itself doesn't have one on its own. The mayor (executive chief) is appointed president of Ghana and approved by the city council, the Sunyani Municipal Assembly. As of 2024, the current mayor of the municipality is Hon. Ansu Kumi.

== Cityscape ==
Sunyani is a popular resettlement location for people all across the country due to its strategic central location, approximately to services such as educational institutions and health facilities, and being near the Ahafo mine. More than half of the housing stock in the city is made up of compound houses.

== Demographics ==
Historical population
Year	Pop.	±%
1970	23,780	—
1984	38,834	+63.3%
2000	61,992	+59.6%
2010	75,366	+21.6%
Source: Ghana Statistical Service. (Note: Sources: 2000 census, 2010 census.)

As of the 2010 census, Sunyani has a population of 75,366 people, making it the sixth largest city in Ghana. The majority of the city's residents is religious, accounted for about 96% of the population. Christianity is the most practiced religion followed by Islam and traditional African religions. Numerous ethnic groups resided in Sunyani, including the Akan, Northerner, Ewe, and Ga-Adangbe. According to a 2018 report, drug use in the city increased by 12%. A recent report from 2021 found that most residents who suffer from substance abuse were in search of healthcare.

== Culture ==
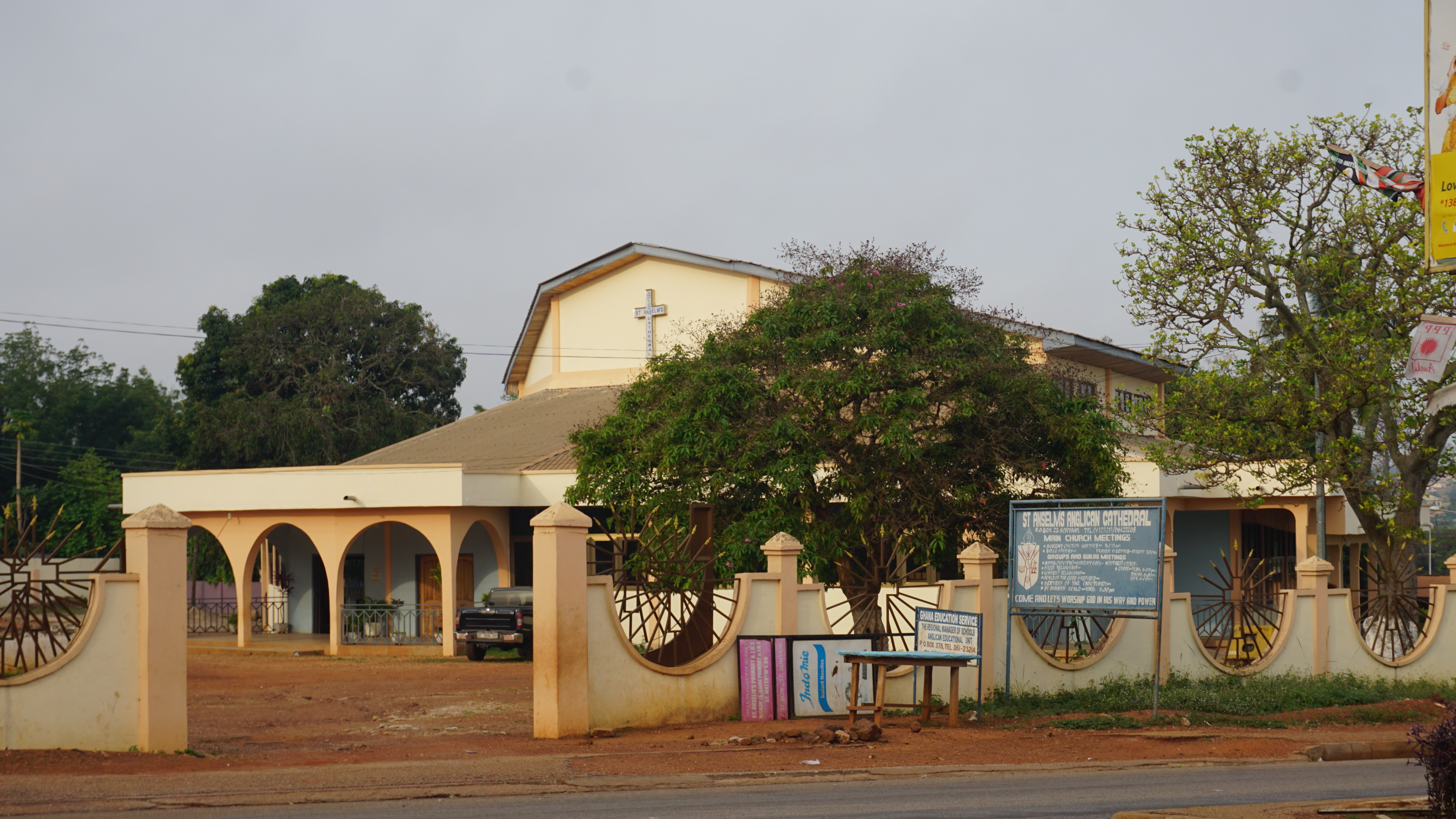
St Anselms Anglican Cathedral Church

The city is home to an art centre, the Bono Regional Centre for National Culture, managed by the National Commission on Culture. The museum helps with organizing culture-related programs for schools within the municipality. Although, many have argued that these programs encouraged "retrogression" and for people to retain onto their own ways, even if there are better options available. As of 2022, the museum is close and is currently undergoing renovations. The city is also home to the Roman Catholic Diocese of Sunyani, established on 30 March 1973.

== Economy ==
The city's economy is mostly agrarian with about 48% of the population engaged in activities relating to agriculture. About 24% of the population is working in the service sector, followed by commerce and industry.

=== Street hawking ===
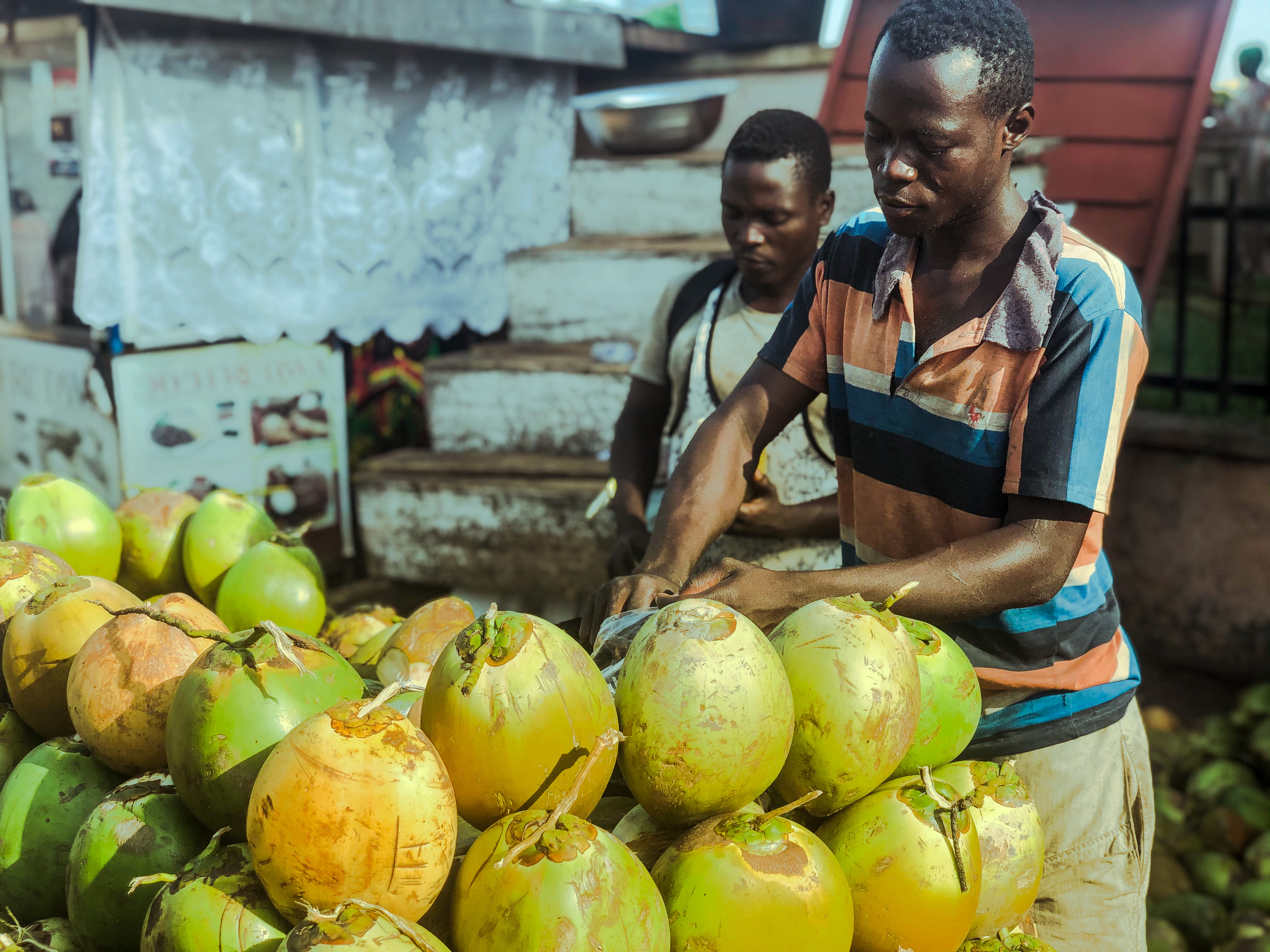
A man selling coconuts in Sunyani

Street hawking in Sunyani, according to findings from a 2024 report, is most commonly done by women who lacks education and knowledge in some kind of trade. They are usually found in unauthorized public areas for reasons such as being closer to potential consumers and availability of space.

=== Agriculture ===
Agriculture in Sunyani is concentrated in one-thirds of the city's total land area. Farmers usually rely on rainwater without or barely any kind of irrigation practice. Although, farms along the banks of the Tano River does intergrade irrigation practices into their cultivation. Crops cultivated include cabbage, garden eggs, carrots, pepper, tomatoes, and cocoa. According to findings from a 2023 study, cocoa bean production in city is relatively low due to poor land management as a result of sharp increases in the city's population and forest degradation. The Cocoa House, located in Sunyani and built by the Ghana Cocoa Board, pays respect to the cocoa industry of the country as a whole.

=== Industry ===
Sunyani is home to African Global Pharma Limited (AGP), the only pharmaceutical manufacturing company in the city. The company is an affiliated company of AGP Canada Inc. with corporate office in Toronto, Canada and produces generic drugs.

== Infrastructure ==
=== Sanitation ===
According to a 2015 report using a small sample size, the people of Sunyani used a mix of public and private toilets, some of which are located relatively far from the city centre. There is one disposal site in the city consisting of 6 treatment ponds, all of which are no longer sufficient. In reality, data on how sludge is managed in the city is minimal.

=== Healthcare ===
Healthcare in Sunyani is regulated by the Sunyani Municipal Health Directorate of the Ghana Health Service. As of 2010, the city have a total of 6 hospitals, 12 clinics, 7 CHPS compounds (Note: CHPS hospitals are a national technique to help provide essential health services to communities who lack access to proper health care.), and 3 maternity homes. The city is home to the Sunyani Municipal Hospital, opened in 1927 and served as the regional hospital until the opening of the Bono Regional Hospital in 2003, now known as the Sunyani Teaching Hospital. Vaccine coverage in the city is considered one of the best in the country. These vaccines, specifically childhood ones, are delivered at health facilities and outreach points. The outreach points are key to deliver vaccines directly to beneficiaries. A 2021 study, prioritizing in the uptake of the administration of malaria vaccines in the municipality, found that there is around a 90% uptake in the administrating doses RTS,S 1 and 2, meeting WHO's target of 90% while the uptake of RTS,S 3 was about 80%.

=== Education ===
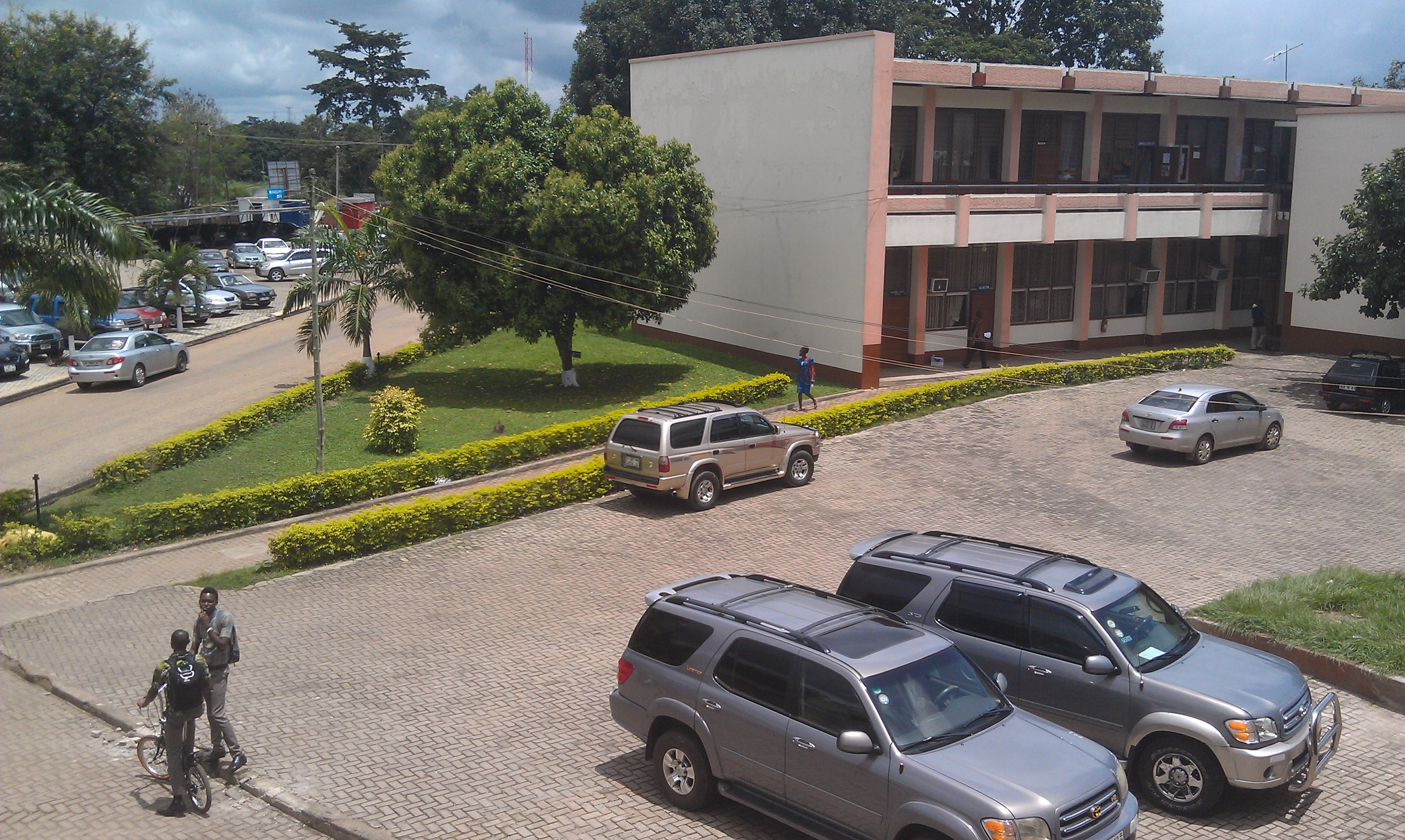
Sunyani Technical University

Education in the city is managed by the education department of the Sunyani municipal assembly, directed by Mr Mark Godfred Domah. The city, along with the municipality is home to 111 basic schools, 50 junior high schools, five senior high/vocational schools and two tertiary institutions.

Sunyani is home to numerous high schools, some of which are listed below:

- St. James Seminary Senior High School
- Sunyani Senior High School
- S.D.A Senior High School
- Sunyani Methodist Technical Institute
- Notre Dame Girls Senior High School
- Chiraa Senior High School
- Odomaseman Senior High School

The city's higher educational institutions include the Sunyani Technical University, a tertiary institution offering degrees in engineering, science, and technology. It was established in 1967 as a technical institute, upgraded to a polytechnic in 1997 and was converted to the Sunyani Technical University in 2016. Another institution of higher education is the University of Energy and Natural Resources, a publicly-funded university established in 2011 prioritizing careers in management of energy and natural resources in the country.

=== Sports ===
Sunyani is home to one major football venue, Coronation Park, which have a maximum capacity of 5,000 people. During preparations of the 2008 Africa Cup of Nations, the stadium was renovated although was not used in the competition. The venue is home to a couple of football clubs, such as BA Stars F.C., Young Apostles F.C., and Prisons Ladies F.C. along with others.

== Transport ==
The city is served by the Sunyani Airport, a domestic airport opened on 13 July 1974 and operated by Ghana Airports Company Limited. The airport was built in 1942 and was used by the Allies during World War II. After the airstrip was abandoned, in 1969, the Government upgraded it into an airport and was eventually opened.

In late September 2022, Uber opened up operations in Sunyani along with Tamale. This makes it one out of six cities in Ghana and 18 cities across West Africa where Uber is available. Local vehicles used for transportation are usually old and insufficient according to findings found by a 2017 study. Walking is the main mode of transportation for getting around the city. Transport is, on average, in the private sector, dominated by taxicabs or tro tros. Road infrastructure, managed by the municipal assembly, is considered to be deficient.

== Major monuments ==
=== Rex ===
In the 1990s, the area was home to the popular Rex Cinema House, a lively spot where people, especially the youth, gathered in the evenings to watch movies and enjoy live music performances. The venue also hosted concerts and song premieres. It was later demolished by a private developer, who replaced it with a three-unit shop for rent but the name continue to know serve as a major trading point in the city.

== International Relations ==
=== Awards ===
Sunyani was voted the cleanest city in Ghana of 2007 by the Ghana Tourism Authority. As part of this award, Digital Production Partnership (DPP), an advertising agency, offered a billboard worth about US$62 to help with advertisements of the municipality.

=== Sister cities – twin towns ===
Sunyani, in partnership with nearby Techiman, currently has a sister city relationship with:

- Tuscaloosa, Alabama (2011)

== Notable people ==
- Geoffrey Acheampong, professional footballer
- Felix Afena-Gyan, professional footballer
- Prince Kwabena Adu, professional footballer
- Lisa-Marie Kwayie, sprinter
- George Kumi, politician and former diplomat
- Edward Kpodo, professional footballer
- Shaka Mawuli, professional footballer
- Raphael Botsyo Nkegbe, athlete
- Alexander Opoku, former professional footballer
- Stephen Opuni, chief executive officer of the Ghana Cocoa Board
- Kwasi Owusu, professional footballer

== See also ==
- Techiman
- List of cities in Ghana
