= Kusaal language =

Gur language spoken in Ghana

Kusaal
- Kusaasi
- Kʋsaal
- Region: Ghana, Burkina Faso, Togo
- Ethnicity: Kusaasi
- Native speakers: 121,000 (2021 census)
- Language family: Niger–Congo?: Atlantic–Congo; Gur; Northern; Oti–Volta; Kusaal
- Writing system: Latin

Language codes
- ISO 639-3: kus
- Glottolog: kusa1250

The Distribution of Kusaal Speakers.

Kusaal, or Kusaasi, is a Gur language spoken primarily in northern eastern Ghana, and Burkina Faso. It is spoken by about 121,000 people and takes its name from the Kusaal people, or Kusasi. There is a distinctive dialect division between Agole, to the East of the Volta River, and Toende, to the West. Agole has more speakers. The 6-district capital; Bawku West with Zebilla as capital (mainly inhabited by the speakers of Atoende Kusaal) and the rest; Binduri, Bawku, Tempane, Garu and Pusiga districts mostly Agole dialect speakers. The complete Bible translation is in the Agole dialect.

== Names ==
The general and accepted name for the language is Kusaal. The name Kusasi refers to the people who speak the language, and it is not accepted by native speakers to refer to the language.

== Grammar ==
The language is a fairly typical representative of the Western Oti–Volta low-level grouping within Gur, which includes several of the more widely spoken languages of Northern Ghana, and also Moore, the largest African language of Burkina Faso (and the largest of all Gur languages, with millions of speakers).

=== Winigku ===
Like most other Western Oti–Volta languages, it has lost the complicated noun class agreement system still found in e.g. the more distantly related Gurmanche, and has only a natural gender system, human/non-human. The noun classes are still distinguishable in the way nouns distinguish singular from plural by paired suffixes:

nid(a) "person" plural nidib(a)

bʋʋg(a) "goat" plural bʋʋs(e)

nɔbir(e) "leg, foot" plural nɔba(a)

fuug(o) "item of clothing" plural fuud(e)

molif(o) "gazelle" plural moli(i)

A unpaired suffix -m(m) is found with many uncountable and abstract nouns, e.g., kuꞌom(m) "water"

The bracketed final vowels in the examples occur because of the feature which most strikingly separates Kusaal from its close relatives: the underlying forms of words, such as buuga "goat" are found only when the word in question is the last word in a question or a negated statement. In all other contexts an underlying final short vowel is dropped and a final long vowel is shortened:

Fu daa nye buug la. "Did You see the goat?"

Fu daa nye buug. "You saw a goat."

Fu daa pu nye buuga. "You didn't see a goat."

Anoꞌone daa nye buuga? "Who saw a goat?"

=== Adjectives ===
Kusaal shows the typical Gur feature whereby the noun and adjective stems are compounded in that order, followed by the singular/plural endings:

bupielig(a) "white goat" [ bu-(g(a)) + piel- + -g(a) ]

bupielis(e) "white goats"

There are a few traces of the old system (as in Gurmanche) whereby the adjective took the singular/plural endings appropriate to the class of the preceding noun, but the system is completely unproductive in Kusaal now.

=== Verbs ===
Verbal flexion is agreeably simple, as in other Western Oti–Volta languages and unlike less closely related Gur languages. Most verbs have five flexional forms.

(a) no ending, used for perfective aspect: M gos buug la. "I've looked at the goat."

(b) -d(a) ending, for imperfective: M gosid buug la. "I look at the goat."

(c) -m(a) for positive imperative: Gosim buug la! "Look at the goat!"

(d) -in subjunctive for irrealis : Fu yaꞌa gosin ... "If you were to look (but you won't) ..."

(e) -b(o), -g(o), -r(e) gerund, verbal noun: o gosig la mor dabiem "his (the angel's) appearance was scary" [Judges 13:6 draft] - literally 'his seeing they had fear'

Some 10% of verbs, with stative meanings, have only a single form.

The verb is preceded by a chain of invariable particles expressing tense, polarity and mood. Serial verb constructions are common and important, as in many West African languages.

=== Pronouns ===
Object pronouns can be severely reduced in form by the Kusaal final-vowel-loss rules, surfacing as single consonants, or even zero; they are preceded by a reduced vowel ending the previous word, which is a reduced form of that word's own underlying final vowel, preserved before the enclitic pronoun:

M boodi f. "I love you." traditionally written M bood if.

M boodu. "I love him/her." traditionally written M bood o.

=== Syntax ===
Word order is strictly SVO, but clefting is common.

Within the noun phrase, except for the typical noun-adjective Gur compounding, the rule is that associative modifier (possessive, genitive) precedes the head:

m buug "my goat"

la nobir "the goat's foot" (la "the", follows its noun)

Numeral and deictics (demonstrative, article) follow, with the quantitative in final place:

m buus atanꞌ la wusa "all my three goats"

== Phonology ==
The sound system of Kusaal is similar to that of its relatives; consonant clusters (except between adjacent words) occur only word-internally at morpheme-junctures and are determined by the limited range of consonants which can appear in syllable-final position. Clusters arising from the addition of suffixes in derivation and flexion are either simplified or broken up by inserted ("svarabhakti") vowels.

The roster of consonants includes the widespread West African labiovelar double-closure stops kp, gb, but the palatal series of the related languages (written ch/j in Dagbani and Hanga and ky/gy in Mampruli) fall in with the simple velars, as in neighbouring Farefare (Frafra, Gurene) and Moore. The reflexes of the palatal and labiovelar double-closure nasals of the related languages, [n] written ny and [ŋm] ŋm - are probably best analysed as a nasalised y and w respectively, but the scope of the nasalisation and the order of its onset with respect to the semivowel is variable.

The vowel system is not yet fully understood, complicated by differences between the Agole and Toende dialects and the system of diphthongs in Agole, which according to the most-favoured analysis, enables Agole with seven contrastive vowel qualities to cover the contrasts represented in Toende with nine qualities. There are short, long, short nasal and long nasal vowels; nasalization collapses the contrast between i~ɩ, e~ɛ, u~ʋ and o~ɔ. All may be glottalised (or 'broken' with a glottal stop) [V₁ʔV₁], as in buꞌud "beating", for 56 monophthongs in some dialects. Glottalized vowels may be distinct from the glottal stop as a consonant, usually in the form [V₁ʔV₂] as in kuꞌom "water". Glottal also marks some monosyllabic verbs buꞌ "beat". In addition, some vowels are contrastively nasalised and others nasalised through the influence of nasal consonants. In the orthography a letter n followed by a vowel or glottal indicates that the preceding vowel is contrastively nasalised, unless in word-final position when nasalisation is indicated by a double nn and a single n is a final consonant.

The language is tonal, with tonal differences distinguishing lexical items (with few minimal pairs) and syntactic constructions. The intrinsic tones of individual words are often overridden with a different pattern in particular syntactic constructions, e.g., main verbs in positive main clauses become all-low-tone. Many words also cause tone changes in closely connected following or preceding words by "tone spreading". The tonal system is a terracing system with two tones and emic downsteps, but with the H! sequence being realized as extra-high in some contexts. The domain of tone is the vowel mora, but there are many constraints on the possible tone patterns with a word; uncompounded nouns show only 4 different overall possibilities at most for any given segmental shape, and inflecting verbs have only two possible intrinsic tone patterns.

== Orthography ==
The orthography used above is basically that of the New Testament translation, which remained the only substantial written work available in Kusaal for a long time. The New Testament orthography, however, spells "goat" boog, and the vowel is intermediate between u and o, phonetic [ʊ]. It is adequate for mother-tongue speakers but does not suffice to distinguish the seven distinct vowel qualities of Agole Kusaal, does not mark tone, and has partly inconsistent word-division conventions due to the complications produced by the Kusaal final vowel loss/reduction phenomena. Since 2013, however, a unified orthography of the language has been in use and is used across various sectors including education at the University of Education, Winneba (Ajumako campus) and by translators who recently (2015) succeeded in revising the New Testament as well as translating the complete Old Testament into the language using the set of guidelines provided in the current orthography.

== Study ==
Materials on Kusaal have gradually increased over the last few years. Some aids for learners were produced by the husband-and-wife Spratt team who pioneered the linguistic study of the language and may be obtainable from GILLBT (Ghana Institute of Linguistics, Literacy and Bible Translation) in Tamale, Ghana. Literacy materials, collections of folk stories and so forth have also been produced by GILLBT. There is also a simple dictionary compiled by David and Nancy Spratt from the same source. Also available are two master theses from native speaker linguists on the phonology (Musah 2010) and the syntax (Abubakar 2011). Much grammatical information on the Burkina Faso dialect (Toende) is to be found in Niggli's primarily phonological work cited below. Several other documents including the Orthography of the language are also available from GILLBT. Another fairly extensive grammar of Agolle Kusaal is available online.
