= Kusasi people =

Ethnic group in Ghana

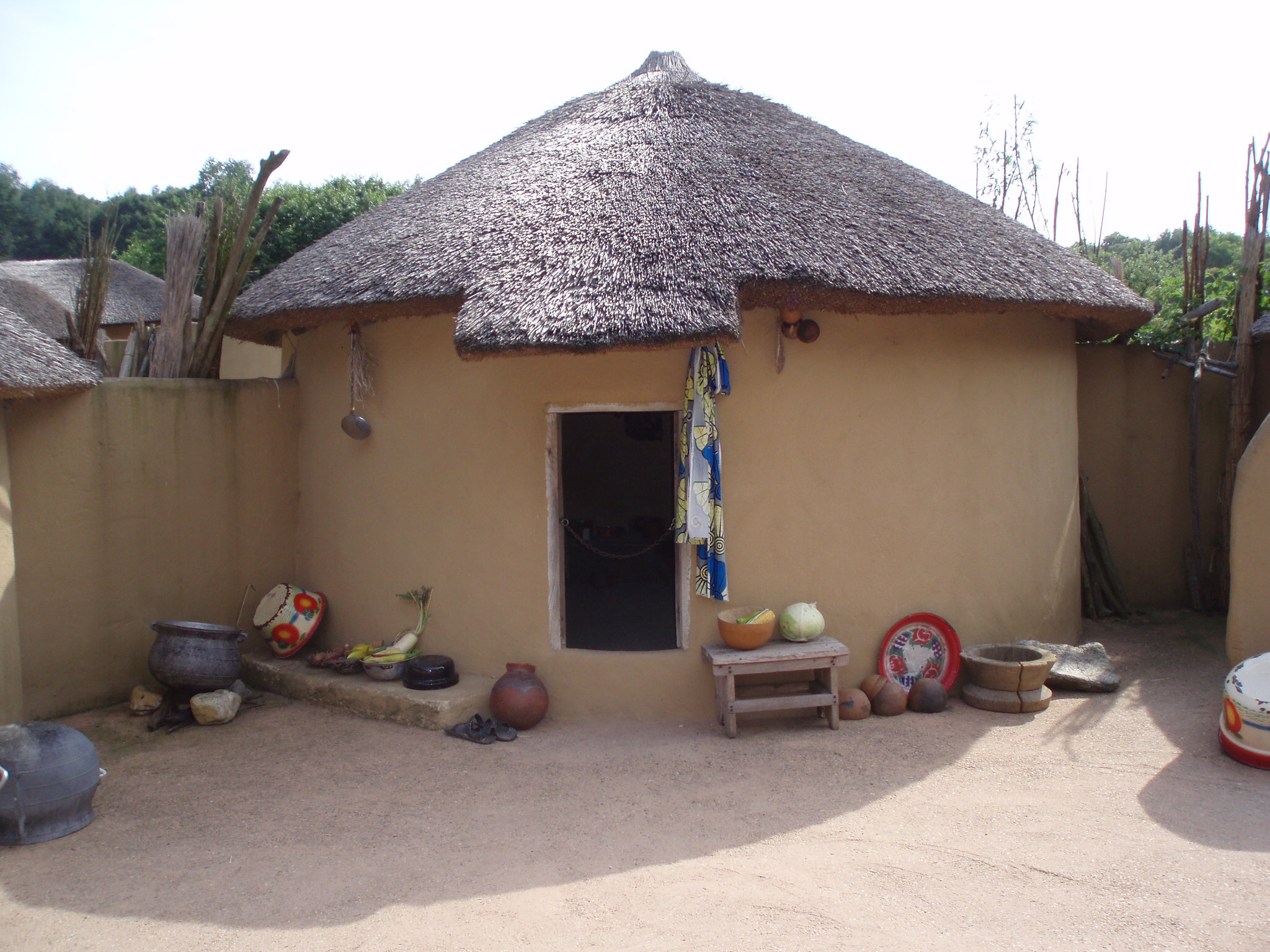
A Kusasi home

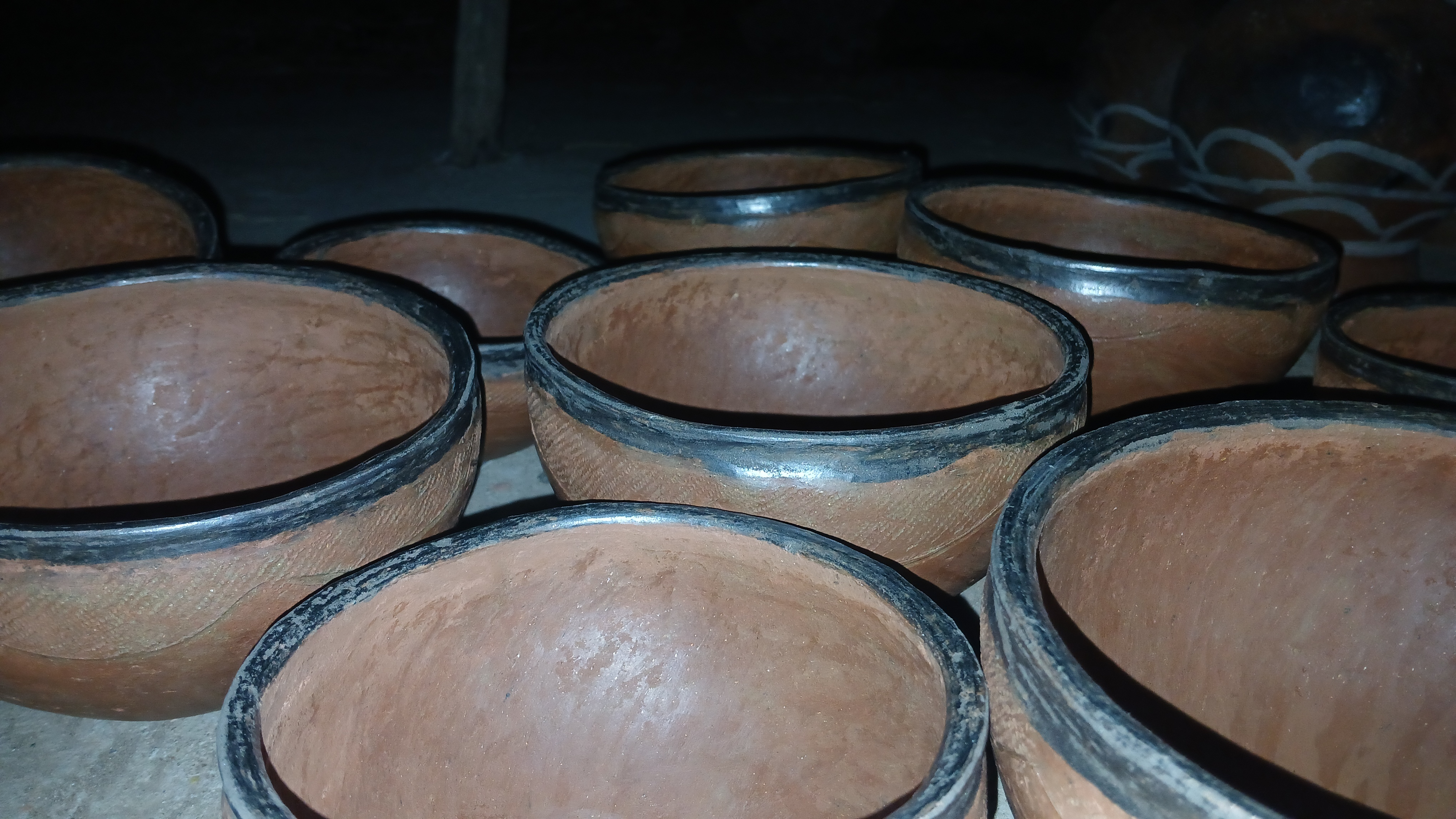
Clay bowls made by Kusasi women

The Kusasi, Kusaasi, or the Kusaal people, are an ethnic group primarily located in the Bawku Traditional Area (Kusaug) of Ghana's Upper East Region, with an estimated population of around 723,000. They are the second-largest ethnic group in Ghana's Northern sector and have a significant presence in southern Burkina Faso.The Kusasi speak the Kusaal language, a Gur language, and are considered indigenous to the eastern part of the Upper East Region. They occupy six administrative districts namely; Bawku Central, Bawku West, Pusiga, Garu, Binduri, and Tempane, with Bawku being the capital. The overlord of the kusaug traditional area is Zugraan Naba Asigri Abugrago Azoka II, Paramount Chief of Bawku and President of the kusaug traditional council.He ascended the throne in 1984 after the death of his father Naba Zunzong Ba'ad Wabub Asigri Abugrago Azoka I. Religiously, the Kusasis are predominantly Christians, followed by Islam, and African traditional religion

== Festival ==
The Kusaasi celebrate the Samanpiid Festival, which serves as a time to give thanks to God for a bountiful harvest during the farming season. This festival was first celebrated in 1987.
