= Garu-Tempane District =

- District
- Districts of Upper East Region

- Location of Garu-Tempane District within Upper East
- Coordinates: 10°51′12.96″N 0°10′47.64″W
- Country: Ghana
- Region: Upper East
- Capital: Garu

Government
  - District Executive: Emmanuel Sin-Nyet Asigri
- Time zone: UTC+0 (GMT)
- ISO 3166 code: GH-UE-GT

Garu-Tempane District is a former district that was located in Upper East Region, Ghana. Originally it was formerly part of the then-larger Bawku East District in August 2004. However, on 15 March 2018, it was split out into two new districts: Garu District (capital: Garu) and Tempane District (capital: Tempane). The district assembly was located in the eastern part of Upper East Region and had Garu as its capital town. It borders Burkina Faso to the north.

Most residents are engaged in peasant farming and trading. Major crops include millet, sorghum, maize, rice, and groundnuts.

Like many rural areas in Ghana, the district faces challenges in healthcare access and infrastructure. The road network in the community is bad.

The area is home to various ethnic groups, including the Bissa, Mossi, Kusasi, Yaana, Mamprusi and the Bimoba people.

== Sources ==
- "Districts of Ghana". Statoids.
