= 2020–21 Accra Hearts of Oak S.C. season =

Accra Hearts of Oak S.C.
- Chairman: Togbe Afede XIV
- Manager: Samuel Boadu
- Stadium: Accra Sports Stadium; Accra, Greater Accra, Ghana
- Premier League: 1st
- FA Cup: 1st
- Top goalscorer: League: Kwadwo Obeng Junior (10); All: Kwadwo Obeng Junior (11)
Home colours	Away colours
- All statistics correct as of 11 August 2021.

The 2021–21 season of Ghanaian club Accra Hearts of Oak S.C. The season covered the period from 20 November 2020 to 8 August 2021.

== Season overview ==
The Hearts of Oak won the domestic double, the league and the FA Cup. They won the league after 12 years wait and a 21 years wait of winning an FA Cup. This title was Hearts’ 21st league title in their history putting them only two behind rivals Asante Kotoko's tally of 23. It was their first league triumph for over a decade, with their last success coming in 2009.

== Technical team ==
Position	Name
Head coach	(Ghana) Samuel Boadu
Assistant head coach 1	(Ghana) Hamza Obeng
Assistant head coach 2	(Ghana) Samuel Nii Noi
Goalkeeper coach	(Ghana) Eric Amponsah
Physical Instructor	(Ghana) Paul Wilson O. Tandoh
Equipment officer	(Ghana) Alhassan Abdulrahman
Youth coach (Auroras)	(Ghana) Edward Nii Odoom

== Squad ==
=== Roaster beginning of season ===
As of 12 March 2021

Note: Flags indicate national team as defined under FIFA eligibility rules; some limited exceptions apply. Players may hold more than one non-FIFA nationality.

No.	Pos.	Nation	Player
1	GK	GHA	Benjamin Nana Yeboah
2	DF	GHA	Fatawu Mohammed (captain)
3	FW	GHA	Victor Aidoo
4	DF	GHA	Franklin Owusu
5	MF	GHA	Frederick Ansah Botchway
6	DF	GHA	William Dankyi
7	MF	NIG	Abdourahmane Mamane
8	MF	GHA	Benjamin Afutu
9	FW	GHA	Abednego Tetteh
10	MF	GHA	Emmanuel Nettey
11	MF	GHA	Michelle Sarpong
12	MF	GHA	Dominic Eshun
13	MF	GHA	Kwadwo Obeng Junior
14	DF	GHA	Robert Addo Sowah
15	DF	GHA	Mohammed Alhassan
16	GK	GHA	Ben Mensah

No.	Pos.	Nation	Player
17	MF	GHA	Patrick Razak
18	MF	GHA	Daniel Barnie Afriyie
19	FW	GHA	Salifu Ibrahim
20	FW	CIV	Eric Dizan
21	FW	GHA	Isaac Mensah
22	GK	GHA	Richmond Ayi
23	DF	GHA	Nuru Sulley
24	MF	GHA	Nurudeen Abdul-Aziz
25	DF	GHA	Larry Sumaila
26	DF	CGO	Raddy Ovouka Machel
27	MF	GHA	Abdul Manaf Umar
28	MF	GHA	Enoch Addo
29	DF	GHA	James Sewornu
30	GK	GHA	Richard Attah
31	DF	GHA	Caleb Amankwah
—	MF	GHA	Aminu Alhassan

== Pre-season and friendlies ==
Win Draw Loss Fixtures

The season was delayed as a result of COVID-19 pandemic in Ghana, causing the team to start preparations in September 2021. Hearts however pitched camp at the Glow-Lamp Soccer Academy owned by Nii Odartey Lamptey in Elmina for two weeks between 29 October 2020 to 12 November 2020. They played 5 pre-season friendlies, winning three and drawing two. They scored 14 goals and conceded 4 goals in the process. They were set to play Medeama SC, however the fixture was replaced with one against Proud United.

31 October 2020 Friendly	Hearts of Oak (Ghana)	4–0	(Ghana) Scientific Soccer Academy	Elmina
		Report		Stadium: Glow Lamp Soccer Academy park

1 November 2020 Friendly	Hearts of Oak (Ghana)	6–1	(Ghana) Lagos Town United	Elmina
		Report		Stadium: Glow Lamp Soccer Academy park

2 November 2020 Friendly	Ebusua Dwarfs (Ghana)	1–1	(Ghana) Hearts of Oak	Elmina
		Report		Stadium: Glow Lamp Soccer Academy park

4 November 2020 Friendly	Proud United (Ghana)	2–2	(Ghana) Hearts of Oak	Elmina
		Report		Stadium: Glow Lamp Soccer Academy park

5 November 2020 Friendly	Elmina Sharks (Ghana)	0–1	(Ghana) Hearts of Oak	Elmina
		Report		Stadium: Glow Lamp Soccer Academy park

== Competitions ==
=== Premier League ===
==== League table ====
Pos	Team	Pld	W	D	L	GF	GA	GD	Pts	Promotion or relegation
1	Hearts of Oak (C, Q)	34	17	10	7	45	23	+22	61	2021–22 CAF Champions League
2	Asante Kotoko	34	15	12	7	37	22	+15	57	
3	WAFA	34	16	8	10	46	38	+8	56	
4	Aduana Stars	34	16	7	11	44	42	+2	55	
5	Medeama	34	15	9	10	38	34	+4	54	

Updated to match(es) played on 18 July 2021. Source: type=Goal.com
(C) Champions; (Q) Qualified for the phase indicated

==== Matches ====
24 November 2020 1	Ashanti Gold	2–2	Hearts of Oak	Accra
20:00 BST				Stadium: Accra Sports Stadium; Attendance: 0

29 November 2020 2	International Allies	1–0	Hearts of Oak	Accra
20:00 BST				Stadium: Accra Sports Stadium; Attendance: 0

4 December 2020 3	Hearts of Oak	0–0	Karela United	Accra
20:00 BST				Stadium: Accra Sports Stadium; Attendance: 0

13 December 2020 4	Hearts of Oak	3–0	Dreams	Accra
20:00 BST				Stadium: Accra Sports Stadium; Attendance: 0

16 December 2020 5	Aduana Stars	2–0	Hearts of Oak	Dormaa Ahenkro
20:00 BST				Stadium: Agyeman Badu Stadium; Attendance: 0

19 December 2020 6	King Faisal Babes	1–2	Hearts of Oak	Techiman
20:00 BST				Stadium: Ohene Ameyaw Park; Attendance: 0

2 January 2021 7	Hearts of Oak	6–1	Bechem United	Accra
20:00 BST				Stadium: Accra Sports Stadium; Attendance: 0

10 January 2021 8	Elimina Sharks	1–1	Hearts of Oak	Elmina
20:00 BST				Stadium: Nduom Sports Stadium; Attendance: 0

17 January 2021 9	Hearts of Oak	2–0	Eleven Wonders	Accra
20:00 BST				Stadium: Accra Sports Stadium; Attendance: 0

23 January 2021 10	Berekum Chelsea	0–0	Hearts of Oak	Berekum
20:00 BST				Stadium: Golden City Sports Stadium; Attendance: 0

30 January 2021 11	Hearts of Oak	0–2	Accra Great Olympics	Accra
20:00 BST				Stadium: Accra Sports Stadium; Attendance: 0

4 February 2021 12	Medeama SC	1–0	Hearts of Oak	Tarkwa
20:00 BST				Stadium: TNA Park; Attendance: 0

7 February 2021 13	Hearts of Oak	1–1	Legon Cities	Accra
20:00 BST				Stadium: Accra Sports Stadium; Attendance: 0

21 February 2021 14	Hearts of Oak	3–2	Ebusua Dwarfs	Accra
20:00 BST				Stadium: Accra Sports Stadium; Attendance: 0

24 February 2021 15	Liberty Professionals	0–1	Hearts of Oak	Dansoman
20:00 BST				Stadium: Carl Reindorf Park; Attendance: 0

28 February 2021 16	Hearts of Oak	0–0	Asante Kotoko	Accra
20:00 BST				Stadium: Accra Sports Stadium; Attendance: 0

7 March 2021 17	Hearts of Oak	4–0	West African Football Academy	Accra
20:00 BST				Stadium: Accra Sports Stadium; Attendance: 0

4 April 2021 18	Hearts of Oak	2–0	Aduana Stars	Accra
20:00 BST				Stadium: Accra Sports Stadium; Attendance: 0

10 April 2021 19	Ashanti Gold	1–0	Hearts of Oak	Obuasi
20:00 BST				Stadium: Len Clay Stadium; Attendance: 0

18 April 2021 20	Hearts of Oak	1–0	International Allies	Accra
20:00 BST				Stadium: Accra Sports Stadium; Attendance: 0

25 April 2021 21	Karela United	1–1	Hearts of Oak	Aiyinase
20:00 BST				Stadium: CAM Stadium; Attendance: 0

2 May 2021 22	Dreams	2–0	Hearts of Oak	Dawu
20:00 BST				Stadium: Theatre of Dreams Sports Stadium; Attendance: 0

9 May 2021 23	Hearts of Oak	2–0	King Faisal Babes	Accra
20:00 BST				Stadium: Accra Sports Stadium; Attendance: 0

12 May 2021 24	Bechem United	0–1	Hearts of Oak	Bechem
20:00 BST				Stadium: Nana Gyeabour's Park; Attendance: 0

16 May 2021 25	Hearts of Oak	2–0	Elimina Sharks	Accra
20:00 BST				Stadium: Accra Sports Stadium; Attendance: 0

21 May 2021 26	Eleven Wonders	2–0	Hearts of Oak	Techiman
20:00 BST				Stadium: Ohene Ameyaw Stadium; Attendance: 0

30 May 2021 27	Hearts of Oak	2–0	Berekum Chelsea	Accra
20:00 BST				Stadium: Accra Sports Stadium; Attendance: 0

6 June 2021 28	Accra Great Olympics	1–1	Hearts of Oak	Accra
20:00 BST				Stadium: Accra Sports Stadium; Attendance: 0

13 June 2021 29	Hearts of Oak	2–0	Medeama SC	Accra
20:00 BST				Stadium: Accra Sports Stadium; Attendance: 0

24 June 2021 30	Legon Cities	2–1	Hearts of Oak	Accra
20:00 BST				Stadium: Accra Sports Stadium; Attendance: 0

27 June 2021 31	Hearts of Oak	1–0	Asante Kotoko	Accra
20:00 BST				Stadium: Accra Sports Stadium; Attendance: 0

4 July 2021 32	Ebusua Dwarfs	1–1	Hearts of Oak	Cape Coast
20:00 BST				Stadium: Cape Coast Sports Stadium; Attendance: 0

11 July 2021 33	Hearts of Oak	1–1	Liberty Professionals	Accra
20:00 BST				Stadium: Accra Sports Stadium; Attendance: 0

17 July 2021 34	WAFA	1–0	Hearts of Oak	Accra
20:00 BST				Stadium: Accra Sports Stadium; Attendance: 0

=== Ghana FA Cup ===
Sponsored by MTN, (MTN FA Cup 2021)

==== Matches ====
2 June 2021 Round of 64	Hearts of Oak (1)	3–0	Liberty Professionals (1)	Accra
GMT		Report		Stadium: Accra Sports Stadium; Attendance: 0

21 June 2021 Round of 32	Hearts of Oak (1)	4–1	Windy Professionals FC (3)	Accra
GMT		Report		Stadium: Accra Sports Stadium; Attendance: 0

8 July 2021 Round of 16	Accra Young Wise (2)	0–1	Hearts of Oak (1)	Dawu
15:00 GMT		Report		Stadium: Theatre of Dreams; Attendance: 0

24 July 2021 Quarter-finals	Elmina Sharks (1)	0–1 (a.e.t.)	Hearts of Oak (1)	Elmina
18:00 GMT		Report	Amankwah 107'	Stadium: Nduom Sports Stadium; Attendance: 0

1 August 2021 Semi-finals	Hearts of Oak (1)	3–0	Medeama (1)	Cape Coast
18:00 GMT	Afutu 12'; Mensah 58'; Afriyie 67' (pen.)	Report		Stadium: Cape Coast Sports Stadium; Attendance: 0

8 August 2021 Final	Hearts of Oak (1)	0–0 (8–7 p)	Ashanti Gold (1)	Accra
18:00 GMT				Stadium: Accra Sports Stadium; Attendance: 0 Referee: Daniel Laryeah
	Penalties
	Mohammed (penalty scored); Nettey (penalty scored); Amankwah (penalty missed); Sowah (penalty scored); Afriyie (penalty missed); Alhassan (penalty scored); Aidoo (penalty scored); Ovouka (penalty scored); Ibrahim (penalty scored); Afutu (penalty missed); Attah (penalty scored)		(penalty missed) Addai; (penalty scored) Dacosta; (penalty missed) Abagna; (penalty scored) Banahene; (penalty scored) Akoto; (penalty scored) Annor; (penalty scored) Agyemang; (penalty scored) Nkrumah; (penalty scored) Agyemang; (penalty missed) Osei; (penalty missed) Mensah

== Squad statistics ==
=== Goalscorers ===
Includes all competitive matches. The list is sorted alphabetically by surname when total goals are equal.

Rank	No.	Pos.	Player	Premier League	FA Cup	Total
1	13	FW	(Ghana) Kwadwo Obeng Junior	10	1	11
2	18	FW	(Ghana) Daniel Afriyie Barnieh	3	5	8
3	3	FW	(Ghana) Victor Aidoo	7	0	7
3	8	MF	(Ghana) Benjamin Afutu	5	2	7
4	21	FW	(Ghana) Isaac Mensah	4	1	5
5	27	MF	(Ghana) Abdul Manaf Umar	3	1	4
6	11	MF	(Ghana) Michelle Sarpong	3	0	3
7	19	MF	(Ghana) Salifu Ibrahim	2	0	2
7	5	MF	(Ghana) Frederick Ansah Botchway	2	0	2
7	10	MF	(Ghana) Emmanuel Nettey	1	1	2
8	7	MF	(Niger) Abdourahmane Mamane	1	0	1
8	17	MF	(Ghana) Patrick Razak	1	0	1
8	26	DF	(Republic of the Congo) Raddy Ovouka Machel	1	0	1
8	31	DF	(Ghana) Caleb Amankwaah	0	1	1
Own goals				2	0	2
Totals				45	12	57

=== Clean sheets ===
The list is sorted by shirt number when total clean sheets are equal. Numbers in parentheses represent games where both goalkeepers participated and both kept a clean sheet; the number in parentheses is awarded to the goalkeeper who was substituted on, whilst a full clean sheet is awarded to the goalkeeper who was on the field at the start of play.

			Clean sheets		
No.	Player	Games Played	Premier League	FA Cup	Total
1	(Ghana) Richard Attah	22	12	0	12
16	(Ghana) Richmond Ayi	6	3	0	3
22	(Ghana) Ben Mensah	6	2	0	2
Totals			15	0	15

== Managers ==
- (Ghana) Edward Nii Odoom (2020)
- (Serbia) Kosta Papić (2020–2021)
- (Ghana) Samuel Boadu (2021–present)
