= Robert Addo Sowah =

Ghanaian professional footballer (born 1993)

Personal information
- Full name: Robert Addo Sowah
- Date of birth: 5 December 1993 (age 32)
- Place of birth: Ghana
- Position: Defender

Senior career*
| Years | Team | Apps | (Gls) |
| 2013–2016 | Uncle 'T' United | | |
| 2017–2023 | Hearts of Oak | 96 | (2) |
- * Club domestic league appearances and goals as of 18 July 2023

Robert Addo Sowah (born 5 December 1993) is a Ghanaian professional footballer who last played as a defender for Ghanaian Premier league side Accra Hearts of Oak.

Sowah came through the Uncle 'T' United youth academy. He began playing senior football with Uncle 'T' United until 2016. In 2017, Addo joined Accra Hearts of Oak. At Hearts of Oak, he played over 100 matches in all competitions and won five trophies. In his six-year stint with the club, he won one Ghana Premier League title, two Ghana FA Cups and one President's Cup. In 2020–21, he played a crucial role as Hearts secured a domestic double.

== Career ==
=== Uncle T ===
Born in Dodowa, a suburb of Accra, Sowah played for Ghana Division One League side Uncle 'T' United, a club based in Prampram for three seasons. His potential and leadership qualities led to him being appointed and serving as the captain for the side before he secured a move to Hearts of Oak. Whilst at Uncle T, he was scouted and approached by four Premier League clubs Kumasi Asante Kotoko, Accra Hearts of Oak, Great Olympics and Elmina Sharks who revealed their intentions of signing him. However his childhood dream of featuring for Accra-based side Hearts of Oak drove him to sign for team.

=== Hearts of Oak ===
Sowah started his Ghana Premier League career when he moved to Accra Hearts of Oak in 2016. He made his debut in 2017 Ghanaian Premier League season. On 9 June 2017, he made his competitive debut in a 4–0 victory over Bolga All Stars FC, coming on in the 74th minute for Vincent Atinga. He went on to feature in 3 league matches that season. During the 2018 Ghanaian Premier League season, he established himself as a starter within the club and played 12 league matches out of 14 before the league was cancelled due to the dissolution of the GFA in June 2018, as a result of the Anas Number 12 Expose. He played 12 league matches out of 14 and scored one goal in the 2019 GFA Normalization Committee Special Competition, helping Hearts to first place in group B. His goal, which happened to be his debut goal was scored on 28 April, in a 2–0 victory over International Allies. Before the 2019–20 Ghana Premier League season was cancelled due to the COVID-19 pandemic in Ghana, he featured in 11 matches. In November 2020, He was named on the club's squad list for the 2020–21 Ghana Premier League season, later in December 2020 he signed a new contract with Hearts of Oak that would keep him at the Accra-based club until 2023.

At the start of the season, Addo was one of the central defenders who were present on the starting line up, in the process playing seven out of the eight first matches of the season. Over the next 14 matches, he did not feature due injuries and loss of form. He was later brought back into the starting eleven by new Coach Samuel Boadu, forming a formidable defensive partnership with Mohammed Alhassan. With the duo playing together, the team went on an eleven match unbeaten streak which finally resulted in them winning the league, after a 12-year trophy drought.

On 8 August, Addo won the domestic double, winning the Ghana FA Cup after their league trophy win a month earlier. Hearts won the 2021 Ghanaian FA Cup following a 8–7 penalty shoot-out victory over Ashanti Gold at Accra Sports Stadium in the final, after a goalless draw in extra-time of which Addo started the match, played the full 120 minutes and also converted his attempt in the penalty shootout.

On 26 June 2022, Addo came on as a 60th-minute substitute for Caleb Amankwah during their 2–1 victory over Bechem United in the 2022 Ghana FA Cup final.

In July 2023, was released by Hearts of Oak after the expiration of his contract. Over his six-year stint, he made over 100 appearances and won five trophies, including one Ghana Premier League title and two FA Cups.

== Honours ==
Hearts of Oak

- Ghana Premier League: 2020–21
- Ghana FA Cup: 2021 2021–22
- President's Cup: 2022
