= William Dankyi =

Ghanaian footballer (born 1999)

Personal information
- Full name: William Ntori Dankyi
- Date of birth: 4 September 1999 (age 27)
- Place of birth: Ghana
- Position: Defender

Team information
- Current team: King Faisal Babes
- Number: 6

Youth career
- Charity Stars

Senior career*
Years	Team	Apps	(Gls)
2017–2018	Liberty Professionals	38	(0)
2018–2022	Hearts of Oak	52	(0)
2023–	King Faisal Babes	16	(0)

International career
2012–2014	Ghana U17		
2016–2018	Ghana U20		
2019	Ghana U23		
- * Club domestic league appearances and goals as of 17 August 2023

William Ntori Dankyi (born 4 September 1999) is a Ghanaian professional footballer who plays as a defender for Ghanaian Premier league side King Faisal Babes.

A youth product of Charity Stars and Liberty Professionals, Dankyi spent three seasons playing for Liberty Professionals before joining Hearts of Oak in May 2018. With Hearts, he won five trophies, one Ghana Premier League title, two Ghana FA Cups, the Ghana President's Cup and the Ghana Super Cup. Departing Hearts in 2022, he joined King Faisal Babes on a short-term contract helping them to reach the 2023 Ghana FA Cup.

Dankyi has capped for Ghana at youth level in all age group covering the Ghana U-17, U-20 and the U-23 national team levels. He was selected for the 2013 African U-17 Championship and 2019 U-23 Africa Cup of Nations.

== Club career ==
=== Early career ===
Dankyi started his career with lower-tier side Charity Stars before moving to Liberty Professionals. His performance in the Ghana U-17 attracted top-tier teams in Ghana.

=== Liberty Professionals ===
In 2015, Dankyi moved to Dansoman-based side Liberty Professionals, who are known for producing young talented footballers. He became a key member of the senior side in 2017. He made his Ghana Premier League debut during the 2017 Ghanaian Premier League season. He featured in 26 league matches. He played 12 league matches during the first round of the 2018 Ghana Premier League season for Liberty Professionals before being poached by Accra Hearts of Oak during the transfer period.

=== Hearts of Oak ===
In May 2018, Dankyi was signed by Accra Hearts of Oak during the second transfer period of the 2018 Ghana Premier League season. He signed a 3-year contract and was expected to serve as the direct replacement for Joshua Otoo whose contract was mutually terminated few weeks before his signing. He made his debut on 24 May 2018 in a 0–0 against West African Football Academy. He played the full 90 minutes of the match and helped them keep a clean sheet. He played in 3 league matches before the league was abandoned due to the dissolution of the GFA in June 2018, as a result of the Anas Number 12 Expose. During the 2019 GFA Normalization Committee Special Competition, he became a key member of the club under Kim Grant and played an integral role in the club as he featured in all 14 group matches helping Hearts to 1st place in group B.

In the 2019–20 Ghana Premier League, due to the arrival of Raddy Ovouka, his league appearances were limited. He only featured in 3 league matches before the league was abandoned and later cancelled due to the COVID-19 pandemic. There were reports at the end of the season that he wanted to leave the team due to a lack of playing time and a limited number of appearances.

Dankyi, on the other hand, remained at the club and was named on the club's squad list for the 2020–21 Ghana Premier League season. He continued to face competition in the left-back role due to Ovouka and only made his first appearance for the club on match-day 7 in a 6–1 victory over Bechem United. At the end of the season, Hearts won the domestic double by winning the league and the 2021 Ghanaian FA Cup after scoring Ashanti Gold in the final via penalty shootout.

Dankyi became a regular starter in the 2021–22 season, following the departure of Ovouka, and played 20 league matches, the most in a season since joining Hearts of Oak. On 27 June, he played the entire 90-minute final match of the 2021–22 Ghanaian FA Cup against Bechem United as a defensive midfielder to win his second FA Cup trophy with goals from Daniel Afriyie and Caleb Amankwah in a 2–1 victory. At the end of the season, he announced his departure from the club after the expiration of his contract. He spent four years, played over 55 matches and won five trophies including the Ghana Premier League.

=== King Faisal ===
In February 2023, Dankyi joined King Faisal signing a short-term contract for 6 months. He made his debut for the club in a 23 April, in a 1–0 loss to Nsoatreman. He played 16 league matches, however despite his performances King Faisal were relegated to the Ghana Division One League. He was instrumental in the Kumasi-based club reaching the FA Cup final with a 3–2 win over Nsoatreman in the semi-final. This was his third consecutive appearance in the cup competition final.

== International career ==
Dankyi has represented Ghana at the U-17, U-20, and U-23 levels, but he has yet to be called up to the senior national team. Dankyi played for the Ghana national under-17 football team from 2012 to 2014. In 2013, he was a member of the squad that played in the 2013 African U-17 Championship. In 2018, Isaac Kwadwo Boateng, popularly known as Coach Opeele a former assistant coach of the U-17 revealed that Dankyi had to miss one of his Senior High School education examination papers due to national team commitment. He was personally scouted by him whilst playing for a colts team at Mamprobi Indafa Park.

He was later promoted to the Ghana national under-20 football team featuring for 2016 to 2018. He was given his first call up in 2016, ahead of the 2017 Africa U-20 Cup of Nations qualifiers. In 2018, he was a member of the squad that played in the 2019 Africa U-23 Cup of Nations qualifiers, Ghana subsequently qualified for the main competition after scoring Algeria. In November 2019, he was selected to be part of the Ghana national under-23 football team ahead of the 2019 Africa U-23 Cup of Nations in Egypt.

== Honours ==
Hearts of Oak

- Ghana Premier League: 2020–21
- Ghana FA Cup: 2021 2021–22
- Ghana Super Cup: 2021
- President's Cup: 2022
