= Salifu Ibrahim =

Ghanaian footballer (born 2000)

Personal information
- Date of birth: 6 June 2000 (age 26)
- Place of birth: Abofour, Ghana
- Height: 1.71 m (5 ft 7 in)
- Position: Attacking midfielder

Team information
- Current team: Wolaitta Dicha

Youth career
- UniStar Academy

Senior career*
Years	Team	Apps	(Gls)
2018–2021	Eleven Wonders	31	(3)
2021–2024	Hearts of Oak	90	(8)
2024–2026	Drita	28	(2)
2026–	Wolaitta Dicha	2	(0)
- * Club domestic league appearances and goals as of 13 March 2026

Salifu Ibrahim (born 6 June 2000) is a professional footballer who plays as an attacking midfielder for Ethiopian Premier League club Wolaitta Dicha. Born in Ghana, he represented his country at youth and senior international levels before switching to the Benin national team in 2025.

Ibrahim began his career with Techiman Eleven Wonders and later played for Hearts of Oak, before moving abroad to Kosovo.

He represented Ghana at youth and senior international levels, and after becoming eligible, he was selected for the Benin senior national team in 2025.

== Club career ==
=== Eleven Wonders ===
Ibrahim is a graduate of UniStar Academy, a Ghana Division One League team. He started his senior career with Techiman Eleven Wonders in August 2018. On 29 December 2019, he made his official debut, coming on in the 69th minute in Wonders' 1–0 loss to Asante Kotoko. He scored his debut goal in the Ghana Premier League on 9 February 2020 by scoring the winning goal via an assist from Abdul Mugees Zakaria to grant Wonders a 2–1 victory. The 2020–21 league season was later cancelled due to the COVID-19 pandemic in Ghana. At the time of its cancellation, he had played in all 15 league matches, starting in 13 of them, and scored 2 goals. Ibrahim's prominence in the Ghana Premier League rose during the first round of the 2020–21 season to the extent that he was referred to as the poster boy and fan's favourite of the club. During the first round, he played 16 matches, scored one goal, provided 4 assists, and won five man of the match awards. Prior to the end of the first round and opening of the transfer window, Ibrahim was linked with several clubs. Despite being a reported target of Medeama, Asante Kotoko, Ashanti Gold and Karela United, Eleven Wonders confirmed the transfer of Ibrahim to Accra-based club Hearts of Oak on 27 February 2021 for an undisclosed fee, signing a three-year deal.

=== Hearts of Oak ===
On 27 February 2021, Accra Hearts of Oak announced that they had signed Ibrahim on a three-year deal. On 7 March 2021, he was handed his debut by Samuel Boadu during his first match in charge, coming on as a substitute in the 61st minute for Frederick Ansah Botchway in their 4–0 victory over West Africa Football Academy. On 13 May, Ibrahim scored his first competitive goal for Hearts of Oak in a 1–0 win over Bechem United at the Nana Fosu Gyeabour Park in Bechem. His second goal for the club came on 13 June 2021, in the Phobia's 2–0 victory over Medeama, Samuel Boadu's former club. He was adjudged the man of the match at the end of the match. At the end of May 2021, he was adjudged the GPL NASCO Player of the Month for May, beating competition from Sam Adams and Ismail Abdul-Ganiyu. His season with Hearts of Oak ended successfully, as he played 16 league matches, scored two goals, provided 4 assists, helping Hearts of Oak to clinch the 2020–21 Ghana Premier League title, their 21st league title after a 12-year trophy drought.

Ibrahim contributed with six appearances in the season's Ghanaian FA Cup, as the tournament ended in a win; in the final against Ashanti Gold, he came on for Isaac Mensah late into the second half of a goalless draw, and converted his attempt in the 8–7 penalty shootout triumph.

At the end of the season, he was awarded the Ghana Premier League Player of the Season, after scoring 3 goals, providing 8 assists, and winning the NASCO man of the match award a record eight times, the highest within the season, beating competition from West African Football Academy's Augustine Boakye, Karela United's Diawisie Taylor, Great Olympics' captain Gladson Awako, and his teammate Benjamin Afutu Kotey. He was also adjudged the Ghana Football Awards Home-based Player of Year.

== International career ==
=== Ghana ===
On 12 February 2021, Ibrahim was among the 32 home-based players called up to the Ghana national team by Black Stars head coach C. K. Akonnor for the African Cup of Nations qualifiers against South Africa and São Tomé and Príncipe.

=== Benin ===
On 6 November 2025, Ibrahim became eligible and switched to the Benin national team, and he was named in the 30-player provisional squad for a friendly match against Burkina Faso.

== Honours ==
Hearts of Oak

- Ghana Premier League: 2020–21
- Ghanaian FA Cup: 2021

Drita

- Football Superleague of Kosovo: 2024–25

Individual

- Ghana Premier League Player of the Season: 2020–21
- Ghana Football Awards Home-based Player of Year: 2020–21
- Ghana Premier League Player of the Month: May 2021
