= Ben Mensah =

Ghanaian professional footballer (born 1983)

Personal information
- Full name: Benjamin Mensah
- Date of birth: 7 August 1983 (age 43)
- Place of birth: Ghana
- Position: Goalkeeper

Senior career*
Years	Team	Apps	(Gls)
- Accra Great Olympics
2012–2013	King Faisal Babes	7	(0)
2015–2016	New Edubiase United	20	(0)
2017–2022	Hearts of Oak	39	(0)
- * Club domestic league appearances and goals as of 3 March 2021

Benjamin Mensah (born 7 August 1983) is a Ghanaian former professional footballer who plays as a goalkeeper for Ghanaian Premier League side Accra Hearts of Oak. He is considered one of the experienced goalkeepers in the Ghana Premier League after previously having stints with Accra Great Olympics, King Faisal Babes and New Edubiase United.

== Career ==
=== Early career ===
Mensah previously played for Accra Great Olympics, King Faisal Babes before moving to New Edubiase United.

=== New Edubiase ===
Mensah played for New Edubiase United during the 2016 Ghanaian Premier League. He played in 20 league matches and was one of the standout performers for the club but couldn't help them from being relegated into the Ghana Division One League.

=== Hearts of Oak ===
In November 2016, Mensah signed a two-year contract with Ghana Premier League giants Accra Hearts of Oak. The contract was set to expire in 2018. He debut on 13 February 2017, playing the full 90 minutes in a 0–0 draw against International Allies. He cemented his place as the main goalkeeper for the club in the 2017 Ghanaian Premier League and made 19 league matches within the season, helping Hearts to a 3rd place league finish. In the 2018 Ghanaian Premier League season, he made 10 league matches before the league was cancelled due to the dissolution of the GFA in June 2018, as a result of the Anas Number 12 Expose. With the arrival of Richmond Ayi from West African Football Academy (WAFA), he became the second goalkeeper for the club and later with Richard Attah coming in from Elimina Sharks, he became the third goalkeeper, because of that he was limited to a few league appearances. In 2019, there were reports that he was leaving the club due to his limited playing time but he later signed a one-year contract extension in December 2019. In June 2020, he revealed that he was glad to serve as senior figure and an inspiration in the Hearts team and get the chance to mentor the younger goalkeepers including Ayi, Attah and Richard Baidoo. He was named on the club's squad list for the 2020–21 Ghana Premier League season.

That season, he continued his role as the back-up goalkeeper, after the appointment of Samuel Boadu as head coach by playing six league to help Hearts win the league after a 12-year trophy drought and win his first trophy of his long lasting career. He also played one FA Cup match, which contributed to Hearts journey to the final of the FA Cup.

On 8 August, he won the domestic double by winning the Ghanaian FA Cup in addition to their league trophy win a month earlier. Hearts won the 2021 Ghanaian FA Cup following a 8–7 penalty shoot-out victory over Ashanti Gold at Accra Sports Stadium in the final, after a goalless draw in extra-time, he was named on the bench and did not feature.

== Honours ==
Hearts of Oak

- Ghana Premier League: 2020–21
- Ghanaian FA Cup: 2021
