= Michelle Sarpong =

Ghanaian professional footballer (born 1998)

Personal information
- Full name: Michelle Sarpong
- Date of birth: 2 December 1998 (age 27)
- Place of birth: Ghana
- Position: Midfielder

Team information
- Current team: Hearts of Oak
- Number: 11

Youth career
- Auroras FC

Senior career*
Years	Team	Apps	(Gls)
–2019	Auroras FC		
2019–	Hearts of Oak	32	(4)
2021–2022	→ Elmina Sharks (loan)	24	(2)
2021–2022	→ Dreams (loan)	11	(0)
- * Club domestic league appearances and goals as of 8 October 2023

Michelle Sarpong (born 2 December 1998) is a Ghanaian professional footballer who plays as a midfielder for Ghanaian Premier League side Accra Hearts of Oak.

Sarpong is a graduate of the Hearts of Oak youth academy and made his first-team debut in March 2019. He won the Ghana Premier League title before securing a domestic double with Hearts in the 2020–21 season after winning the 2021 Ghana FA Cup. He had spells with Elmina Sharks and Dreams. At Dreams, he won the Ghana FA Cup for the second time in his career.

== Career ==
Sarpong started his career with Accra Hearts of Oak's junior side Auroras FC who play in the Ghana Division Two League. He served as captain of the side until January 2019, when he was promoted by coach Kim Grant as he signed his first professional contract for Hearts of Oak ahead of the 2019 GFA Normalization Committee Special Competition. On 31 March 2019, under the management of Kim Grant, Sarpong made his competitive debut as an 82nd-minute substitute for Kwadwo Obeng Junior in a 1–0 win against Dreams in the Ghana Premier League. He scored his debut goal, by scoring the first goal in a 4–0 victory over West African Football Academy. In his debut season, Sarpong made an instant impact, playing 13 of the 14 matches played in the competition, helping Hearts to finish first in Group A and qualify for the semi-finals. In his first season, he was a standout player for Hearts of Oak. In the 2019–20 season, he suffered a leg sprain injury and played only 4 matches whilst the league was cancelled due to the COVID-19 pandemic in Ghana.

Sarpong got off to a good start in the 2020–21 season, playing the first six matches and starting in four of them. Most notable amongst those matches was his brace against Dreams on 13 December 2020, which helped Hearts to a 3–0 win and gave them their first victory of the season. On 19 December 2020, he picked up an injury in their 2–1 victory over King Faisal Babes and had to stay on the touchline for the next 8 matches. He made a return on 24 February 2021 coming on as a late substitute for Patrick Razak in a 1–0 victory over Liberty Professionals. On 7 March 2021, he came off the bench to score his third goal of the season scoring the final goal from an assist by Randy Ovouka in a 4–0 victory over West African Football Academy. He subsequently went on to play in a number of matches mostly coming on from the bench as Hearts won the league after a 12-year trophy drought. At the end of the season, Sarpong was part of the Hearts' team that won the domestic double by winning the 2021 Ghanaian FA Cup, after beating Ashanti Gold in the final via an 8–7 penalty shootout after the match remained goalless after extra time.

On 6 October 2021, Sarpong joined Ghana Premier League team Elmina Sharks on a season-long loan. He made his debut in the first week of the season, scoring the opening goal of the season in a 1–1 draw against newly promoted Accra Lions on 29 October 2021. At the end of the season, he played 24 matches, scored two goals and provided one assist. He also won two man of the match awards against Accra Lions and Dreams. Despite his impressive performances the team was relegated from the Ghanaian top flight league. At the end of his loan deal he returned to Hearts of Oak.

In January 2023, after not featuring for Hearts during the first half of the season, Sarpong joined Dreams on a 6-month loan deal till the end of the season. On 29 January, he made his debut for the club, coming on in the 62nd minute for Dede Ishmael in a 1–0 loss to Berekum Chelsea. He played 11 league matches at the end of his loan spell. On 18 June, he won the Ghana FA Cup for the second time in his career, despite being an unused substitute in Dreams' 2–0 victory over King Faisal.

== Honours ==
Hearts of Oak

- Ghana Premier League: 2020–21
- Ghana FA Cup: 2021

Dreams

- Ghana FA Cup: 2022–23
