= Kwadwo Obeng Junior =

Ghanaian footballer (born 1999)

Personal information
- Full name: Kwadwo Obeng Junior
- Date of birth: 1 June 1999 (age 27)
- Place of birth: Tamale, Ghana
- Position: Forward

Team information
- Current team: Hearts of Oak
- Number: 13

Youth career
- Aduana Stars

Senior career*
Years	Team	Apps	(Gls)
–2017	Nea Salamina Ghana		(13)
2018–	Hearts of Oak	94	(17)
- * Club domestic league appearances and goals as of 17 August 2021

Kwadwo Obeng Junior (born 1 June 1999) is a Ghanaian professional footballer who plays as a forward for Ghanaian Premier league side Accra Hearts of Oak.

Obeng began his career at Aduana Stars before joining Nea Salamina Ghana in 2016. He signed for Hearts of Oak in 2018, where he has made over 100 appearances and scored over 20 goals over four seasons and won one Ghana Premier League title, two Ghana FA Cup and two President's Cup.

== Career ==
=== Nea Salamina ===
Obeng started his career with Dormaa-based team Aduana Stars. He subsequently played for Ghana Division One League side Nea Salamina Ghana (now Wamanfo Mighty Royals FC) in 2016–2017. He scored thirteen league goals and three goals in the Ghana FA Cup in 2017 including goals against Steadfast FC in the round of 16 and Asante Kotoko in the quarter-finals. He led the club to their highest finish in the FA Cup before losing to Asante Kotoko in the quarter-final. His performance against Kotoko attracted interest from the club and made him a subject of discussion in the media space.

=== Hearts of Oak ===
Obeng moved to Hearts of Oak in April 2018 ahead of the 2018 Ghana Premier League season. On 29 April 2018, Obeng made his competitive debut for Hearts starting in a 1–0 match against fierce rivals Kumasi Asante Kotoko. He played 63 minutes of the match before being taken off for Aboubacar Traoré. He got the chance to only play three matches as the league was cancelled due to the Anas Number 12 expose which caused the dissolution of the Ghana Football Association. The following season, during the 2019 GFA Committee Special Competition, Obeng became a constant member of the starting line up under the management of Kim Grant. On 31 March 2019, during the first match of the competition, Obeng scored his first competitive goal for the club helping them to secure a slim 1–0 victory over Dreams FC. On 14 April 2019, he scored another goal to help Hearts secure a win over Liberty Professionals and keep them on track of qualifying for the CAF Champions League. At the end of the competition, he played thirteen matches and scored two goals as Hearts placed first in group B and qualified for the semi-finals. They were however eliminated by Asante Kotoko in the championship play-off semi-finals. Obeng missed out in 2019–20 Ghana Premier League season and only played three matches due to injuries. The league was later cancelled halfway to the end due to the COVID-19 pandemic in Ghana. On 20 October 2020, he signed a 3-year contract extension to keep him at the club till 2023 ahead of the 2020–21 season. He was expected to play a more important role after the departure of Joseph Esso and Kofi Kordzi.

On 24 November 2020, Obeng started the season on a good note by scoring a brace in a 2–2 draw against Ashanti Gold. He scored another goal in Hearts first win of the season, to help them to a 3–0 victory over Dreams FC after going three matches without a win. On 7 February 2021, Obeng scored an equalizer in the 87th minute to salvage a point for Hearts in a home match against Legon Cities. Subsequently, Obeng went on a five match goal drought and missed two extra matches due to injuries before scoring an late equalizer on 25 April in the 86th minute to earn Hearts a crucial point against Karela United. After that he went on to score five goals in ten matches to help Hearts win the league and end their 12-year trophy drought.

Obeng won the Ghanaian FA Cup on 8 August, after Hearts scored Ashanti Gold in the final via a penalty shootout due to goalless draw in extra time. Obeng missed the final match due to an injury even though he played a crucial part in their journey to the final by playing in three matches and scored a goal against Liberty Professionals in the round of 64.

He ended the season with eleven goals in twenty five matches to end as the club's top scorer in all competitions with ten of those goals coming in the league.

Obeng made his return from injury in the 2021–22 season, making 24 league appearances and scored 3 goals. He scored his first goal of the season on 31 January 2022 in a 1–0 victory over King Faisal. He was an unused substitute as Hearts of Oak won the 2022 Ghanaian FA Cup on 24 June.

On 5 March 2023, Obeng played the entire 90 minutes of the 2023 President's Cup, which Hearts won by 1–0, thanks to a header by Konadu Yiadom.

== Honours ==
Hearts of Oak

- Ghana Premier League: 2020–21
- Ghana FA Cup: 2021, 2022
- Ghana Super Cup: 2021
- President's Cup: 2022, 2023
