= Mohammed Alhassan (footballer, born 1992) =

Ghanaian footballer

Personal information
- Date of birth: 5 June 1992 (age 34)
- Place of birth: Kumasi, Ghana
- Height: 1.84 m (6 ft 0 in)
- Position: Defender

Team information
- Current team: Hearts of Oak

Youth career
- West African Football Academy

Senior career*
Years	Team	Apps	(Gls)
2015–2018	West African Football Academy	51	(1)
2018–	Hearts of Oak	60	(1)

International career^{‡}
2019–	Ghana	7	(1)
- * Club domestic league appearances and goals as of 18:00, 15 July 2020 (UTC) ‡ National team caps and goals as of 18:00, 15 July 2023 (UTC)

Mohammed Alhassan (born 5 June 1992) is a Ghanaian footballer who plays as a defender for Hearts of Oak and Ghana.

== Club career ==
Alhassan began his career at West African Football Academy. In 2015, he was promoted to the senior side, where he immediately became one of the reliable centre-backs. He made his senior debut on 20 February 2016, starting a league match against Kumasi Asante Kotoko. He played the full match as WAFA won by 2–0. He went on to play 26 league matches that season, with WAFA placing ending the season in second place, their highest ever rank. The following season, 2017 season, he played 10 league matches. After the departure of Gideon Waja, he was appointed as the club's captain for the 2018 season. Before the league was truncated, due to the Anas Number 12 expose, he played 15 league matches and scored a goal, his debut goal in 2–1 loss to Eleven Wonders on 15 April. His contract with club ended at the end of season.

Alhassan signed for Hearts of Oak as a free agent in December 2018 on a four-year contract. On 31 March 2019, he made his debut as a starter in a 1–0 victory over Dreams FC. He played 14 out of 15 league matches during the 2019 GFA Normalization Committee Special Competition to help Hearts place first in group B and qualify for the championship play-off semi-finals.

The following season, he was ever present by playing all 14 league matches, the season was however cancelled due to the COVID-19 pandemic in Ghana. He continued his good form during double winning season, the 2020–21 season. During the league season, he played all but 4 matches, completing the season with 32 league appearances the most by any Hearts player within the season. During the second half of the season, after the appointment of Samuel Boadu he formed a defensive partnership with Robert Addo Sowah. With the duo playing together, the team went on an eleven match unbeaten streak which finally resulted in them winning the league, after a 12-year trophy drought.

On 8 August, Alhassan helped Hearts to win the domestic double by winning the Ghanaian FA Cup in addition to their league trophy win a month earlier. Hearts won the 2021 Ghanaian FA Cup following a 8–7 penalty shoot-out victory over Ashanti Gold at Accra Sports Stadium in the final, after a goalless draw in extra-time of which Alhassan started the match, played the full 120 minutes and also converted his attempt in the penalty shootout.

== International career ==
On 9 June 2019, Alhassan made his debut for Ghana in a 1–0 friendly defeat against Namibia.

=== International goals ===
Scores and results list Ghana's goal tally first.

No.	Date	Venue	Opponent	Score	Result	Competition
1.	24 July 2022	Cape Coast Sports Stadium, Cape Coast, Ghana	Benin	2–0	3–0	2022 African Nations Championship qualification

== Honours ==
Hearts of Oak

- Ghana Premier League: 2020–21
- Ghanaian FA Cup: 2021
