= Abednego Tetteh =

Ghanaian footballer (born 1990)

Personal information
- Full name: Abednego Kofi Tetteh
- Date of birth: 9 October 1990 (age 36)
- Height: 1.83 m (6 ft 0 in)
- Position: Forward

Senior career*
Years	Team	Apps	(Gls)
2016	Bechem United	24	(13)
2016–2017	Al-Hilal (Omdurman)		
2017	Jimma Aba Buna		
2017–2018	Al-Hilal El-Obeid		
2018–2019	Real Kashmir	11	(4)
2019–2020	TRAU	5	(0)
2020–2021	Hearts of Oak	5	(0)
- * Club domestic league appearances and goals as of 14:44,18 August 2021 (UTC)

Abednego Kofi Tetteh (born 9 October 1990) is a Ghanaian footballer who last played as a forward for Accra Hearts of Oak.

== Career ==
Tetteh had his breakout season with Bechem United in 2016, during the 2016 Ghana Premier League season, which he played 24 league matches, scored 13 goals and made 5 assists. He also won the Ghanaian FA Cup in 2016 after the team scored his former club Okwawu United in the final by 3–1 through a brace from Yaw Annor. He secured a move to Sudanese club Al-Hilal Club in late 2016. He won the Sudan Premier League during the 2017 season whilst playing with them. He subsequently had spells in Ethiopia with Jimma Aba Buna and back again in Sudan with Al-Hilal El-Obeid. After his spells in Sudan and Ethiopia, he moved to India and joined Real Kashmir and later TRAU.

In May 2020, Tetteh joined Ghana Premier League side Accra Hearts of Oak on a free transfer, signing a three-year deal with the club. He made his debut 29 November 2020, in a 1–0 loss to International Allies. He started the match played 45 minutes before being substituted at halt time for Eric Dizan. Tetteh won the double with Hearts in his debut season with the club, however he played a role as back up forward to Kwadwo Obeng Junior, Victor Aidoo and Isaac Mensah as he was limited to 5 league matches and 2 appearances in the Ghanaian FA Cup as Hearts beat Ashanti Gold in the final via a penalty shootout. The win made it his second time of winning the competition after winning with Bechem in 2016.

On 18 August 2021, his contract with the club was mutually terminated after a 15 months stay with the club.

== Career statistics ==
=== Club ===
As of 19 August 2021.

Club	Season	League			Cup		Continental		Other		Total	
Club	Season	Division	Apps	Goals	Apps	Goals	Apps	Goals	Apps	Goals	Apps	Goals
Bechem United	2016	Ghana Premier League	24	13	0	0	0	0	0	0	24	13
Al-Hilal (Omdurman)	2017	Sudan Premier League	?	?	0	0	7 (Note: Appearances in the CAF Champions League)	2	0	0	7	2
Real Kashmir	2018–19	I-League	11	4	0	0	–		0	0	11	4
Career total			35	17	0	0	7	2	0	0	42	19

== Honours ==
Bechem United

- Ghanaian FA Cup: 2016

Al-Hilal Club

- Sudan Premier League: 2017

Hearts of Oak

- Ghana Premier League: 2020–21
- Ghanaian FA Cup: 2021
