= Benjamin Afutu =

Ghanaian professional footballer (born 1996)

Personal information
- Full name: Benjamin Afutu Kotey
- Date of birth: 2 May 1996 (age 30)
- Place of birth: Ghana
- Position: Midfielder

Team information
- Current team: Mekelle 70 Enderta

Senior career*
| Years | Team | Apps | (Gls) |
| 2017 | Karela United | 25 | (5) |
| 2018–2021 | Hearts of Oak | 57 | (7) |
| 2021–2022 | Eastern Company | 8 | (0) |
| 2022–2024 | Al-Taqadom | | |
| 2024– | Mekelle 70 Enderta | | |
- * Club domestic league appearances and goals as of 17 August 2022

Benjamin Afutu Kotey (born 2 May 1996) is a Ghanaian professional footballer who plays as a midfielder for Mekelle 70 Enderta.

Afutu began his professional career with Karela United in 2017. He helped the club gain promotion to the Ghana Premier League after winning the Division One League Zone II. In 2018, he signed Accra Hearts of Oak. At Hearts, he won the Ghana Premier League and Ghana FA Cup in 2021. During his stint with Hearts of Oak, he established himself as the best defensive midfielder in the league. He joined Eastern Company in October 2021 before moving to Saudi Arabian side Al-Taqadom in 2022.

== Career ==
=== Karela United ===
Afutu played for Karela United when they played in the Ghana Division One League. During the 2017 season, he played 25 league matches, made 7 assists and scored 5 goals to help them win the Division One League Zone II and secure promotion into the Ghana Premier League, for the first time in the club's history.

=== Hearts of Oak ===
Afutu joined Ghana Premier League side Accra Hearts of Oak in December 2017, after impressing the technical team during pre-season trials. He signed a three-year deal ahead of the 2018 season. On 29 April 2018, he made his debut as an 80th-minute substitute for Joseph Esso in a 1–0 league match against rivals Asante Kotoko. He only featured in 4 league matches in that season before the league was cancelled due to the Number 12 expose.

During the 2019 GFA Normalization Special Competition, he played 11 of the 14 league matches to help Hearts win their Group and progress to the semi-finals. However they lost to Asante Kotoko via a penalty shootout. He continued to play a key role in the team by playing 13 of the 15 league matches and scored 2 goals in the 2019–20 season as the league was again cancelled, this time due to the COVID-19 pandemic in Ghana.

There were reports in 2020 that he was refusing to extend his contract with the club in the hopes of obtaining a better contract renewal or signing with a new club. After negotiations with the club, he later signed a one-year contract extension until June 2021. Afutu was ever present in the club's historic domestic double triumph in 2020–21 season.

On 19 December 2020, he scored the first goal in a 2–1 victory over King Faisal. The following week, he scored another goal in a 6–1 rout over Bechem United. He played 29 league matches, scored 5 goals from a defensive midfield position whilst winning man of the match awards against Elmina Sharks and Berekum Chelsea, also scoring in both matches, to help Hearts win their 21st league title after a 12-year trophy drought. He scored two goals on Heart's road to the 2021 Ghanaian FA Cup final. On 8 August, Afutu won the Ghana FA Cup following an 8–7 penalty shoot-out victory over Ashanti Gold at Accra Sports Stadium in the final, after a goalless draw in extra-time; Afutu played the full 90 minutes and in the shoot-out, he took Hearts' tenth penalty, which was saved by Kofi Mensah.

=== Eastern Company ===
In October 2021, Afutu joined newly promoted Egyptian club Eastern Company on a three-year contract. On 5 November, he made his debut in a 3–0 loss to Smouha, playing the full 90 minutes of the match. He went on to play in the next six matches before being shown a red card in a league match against Al Ittihad Alexandria on 14 February 2022. He returned and only played one match against Zamalek in May 2022. The following month, his contract was terminated and was released by the Eastern Company Club board.

In August 2022, Afutu joined Saudi Arabian club Al-Taqadom. He signed a one-year contract with the club.

== Honours ==
Karela United

- Ghana Division One League Zone II: 2017

Hearts of Oak

- Ghana Premier League: 2020–21
- Ghana FA Cup: 2021
