= Raddy Ovouka =

Congolese footballer (born 1999)

Personal information
- Full name: Raddy Machel Hokemba Ovouka
- Date of birth: 7 December 1999 (age 26)
- Place of birth: Congo
- Position: Left-back

Team information
- Current team: Drita
- Number: 26

Senior career*
Years	Team	Apps	(Gls)
2018–2023	Accra Hearts of Oak	46	(1)
2022	→ New Mexico United (loan)	9	(0)
2023	→ Drita (loan)	26	(1)
2024–	Drita	83	(4)

International career
2020–	Congo	9	(0)
- * Club domestic league appearances and goals as of 31 May 2026

Raddy Machel Hokemba Ovouka (born 7 December 1999) is a Congolese professional footballer who plays as left-back for Drita in the Kosovo Superleague and the Congo national team.

Ovouka joined Accra Hearts of Oak in 2018, he quickly rose through the ranks and helped the club to win the Ghana Premier League and Ghana FA Cup in 2021. His performances also led him to be considered as the best left-back in the Ghana Premier League. In 2022, he spent time on loan at USL Championship side New Mexico United before embarking on another loan deal to Kosovo-based club Drita Gjilan.

Ovouka has represented the Congo national team and made his senior international debut in March 2021.

== Club career ==
=== Hearts of Oak ===
In January 2018, Ovouka joined Accra Hearts of Oak. He was a member of their squad during their GHALCA Top 8 competition, but he did not any appearance. He made his official debut on 24 March 2018, starting in their 3–1 loss to Ashanti Gold during the 2018 Ghana Premier League season. He played 43 minutes before being substituted for Isaac Mensah. That was his only appearance that season as the league was abandoned due to the dissolution of the GFA in June 2018, as a result of the Anas Number 12 Expose. During the 2019 GFA Normalisation Competition, he played two matches as Hearts made it to the championship semi-final playoff. Ovouka had his breakthrough season during the 2019–20 season displacing William Dankyi from the left-back position. He started and played the whole 90 minutes in 12 matches, missing only two matches within that period before the league was cancelled due to the COVID-19 pandemic in Ghana. His performances earned him a nomination for the Congolese footballer of the year in 2020.

In January 2021, Ovouka extended his contract by two years. In the 2020–21 season, Ovouka was Hearts of Oak's first choice left-back in their double winning season. He played 29 league matches, scored one goal and made three assists to help Hearts in winning the 2020–21 Ghana Premier League after a 12-year trophy drought. His only goal of the season was his debut goal, which was scored on 7 March 2021 during Samuel Boadu's first game in charge, helping Hearts to a 4–0 victory over West African Football Academy. Ovouka played the full 90 minutes plus extra time in the 2021 Ghana FA Cup final, scoring Hearts' eighth penalty in the penalty shootout to help them complete their domestic double. At the end of the season, he was regarded as the best left-back in the league and was reportedly a target for a Ligue 1 club as well as other African clubs.

=== New Mexico United ===
On 5 January 2022, it was announced that, as a result of a contract dispute, Ovouka would be loaned to USL Championship club New Mexico United. On 8 January, New Mexico announced the signing of Ovouka on a one-year loan deal with option for a permanent transfer at the end of the loan spell. He made his debut on 31 March 2022, coming on in the 90th minute for Sergio Rivas in a 2–2 draw against Oakland Roots. On 6 April, he made his first start for the club in the second round of U.S. Open Cup, scoring the 3rd goal in their 5–0 victory over Las Vegas Legends.

=== FC Drita ===
On 26 January 2023, Ovouka joined Kosovo Superleague club Drita Gjilan on a season-long loan from Ghanaian club Hearts of Oak. He quickly established himself as a regular in the first team and helped the club compete in domestic and European competitions.

Following a successful loan spell, Drita exercised the option to retain the Congolese defender on a permanent basis. On 6 February 2024, the club announced that Ovouka had signed a new contract keeping him at the club until June 2027. During the 2023–24 season, Ovouka became one of Drita's most influential players, contributing both defensively and offensively from the left-back position. In February 2024, he was rewarded with a contract extension after recording one goal and five assists in 22 appearances across all competitions. He was later voted FC Drita Player of the Month for March 2024.

Ovouka was part of the Drita squad that won the 2024–25 Kosovo Superleague title, with four matches remaining, clinching the club's fourth league championship. On the final day of the season, he scored in Drita's 4–1 victory over Feronikeli 74 as the club celebrated its championship triumph in front of its home supporters in Gjilan. The title qualified Drita for the 2025–26 UEFA Champions League qualifying rounds.

The following season, Ovouka also featured prominently in the club's UEFA Champions League, UEFA Europa League and UEFA Conference League qualifying campaigns, helping Drita achieve some of the most successful European results in the club's history, qualifying for the group stage of the 2025–26 UEFA Conference League and subsequently the knockout phase. At the end of the 2025–26 Kosovo Superleague, Drita was again crowned champions while also securing the 2025 Kosovar Supercup in January 2026.

== International career ==
On the back of his performance in the Ghana Premier League, Ovouka received his first call-up to the Congo national team in March 2020 ahead of the team's 2021 Africa Cup of Nations qualifiers against Eswatini. He made his debut on 26 March 2021 playing the full 90 minutes in their goalless draw against Senegal in their 2021 Africa Cup of Nations qualifiers Group I.

== Career statistics ==
=== International ===
As of match played 18 June 2023

Congo
Year	Apps	Goals
2021	5	0
2022	3	0
2023	1	0
Total	9	0

== Honours ==
Hearts of Oak

- Ghana Premier League: 2020–21
- Ghanaian FA Cup: 2021

Drita

- Kosovo Superleague: 2024–25, 2025–26
- Kosovar Supercup: 2025
