= Frederick Ansah Botchway =

Ghanaian footballer (born 1996)

Personal information
- Full name: Frederick Ansah Botchway
- Date of birth: 31 October 1996 (age 30)
- Place of birth: Accra, Ghana
- Position: Midfielder

Team information
- Current team: Kannur Warriors FC
- Number: 8

Youth career
- –2015: Charity Stars

Senior career*
Years	Team	Apps	(Gls)
2015–2019	Liberty Professionals	43	(2)
2020–2022	Hearts of Oak	55	(2)
2022	Samartex	0	(0)
2022–2023	Adama City	10	(0)
2024	Dynamos	17	
2024–2026	Scottland	33	(0)
- * Club domestic league appearances and goals as of September 2026

Frederick Ansah Botchway (born 31 October 1996) is a Ghanaian professional footballer who plays as a midfielder.

Botchway began his senior career playing for Liberty Professionals aged 19. In 2020, Botchway signed for Accra Hearts of Oak on a free transfer, where he won five trophies, including a Ghana Premier League title, two Ghana FA Cup, and a President's Cup. In 2022, he moved to Samartex, but a month later joined Ethiopian club Adama City. Frederick Ansah Botchway join Dynamos FC in 2024 but months later joined Zimbabwean club Scottland

== Club career ==
=== Liberty Professionals ===
Botchway started his senior career with Dansoman side Liberty Professionals. Ahead of the 2015–16 season, he was promoted to the senior team. He made his professional debut on 1 June 2016 when he was brought on in the 80th minute during a 1–0 loss to Medeama. On 18 September 2016, he made his first start for the club and played the full 90 minutes in a 3–1 win over Bechem United.

The following season, in 2017, he became an important member of the team, playing in 21 league matches and scoring one goal. The goal was his first league goal, which he scored after coming on as a substitute in a 4–2 victory over Berekum Chelsea on 8 October 2017. In the 2018 season, Botchway played 7 of the 15 league matches as the league was cancelled due to corruption scandal documentary Anas Number 12 exposé in relation to the Ghana Football Association.

He played a major role in Liberty's 2019 GFA Special Competition campaign of which he played 13 of 14 matches played and scored a goal to help Liberty finish third, two points shy of a semi-finals. His performance during that campaign made him a transfer target for top teams such as Asante Kotoko, Hearts of Oak and Legon Cities after his contract with Liberty expired. At the end of his 4–year stay with the club he played 43 league matches and scored 2 goals.

=== Hearts of Oak ===
Botchway moved to Hearts of Oak on a free transfer in January 2020, two games after the start of the 2019–20 Ghana Premier League season. On 12 January 2020, he started his first match in a 2–1 victory over Cape Coast Ebusua Dwarfs. He played 70 minutes of the match before being substituted for Dominic Eshun. He played 10 matches before the league was cancelled due to the COVID-19 pandemic in Ghana.

In his second season with Hearts, Botchway played a major role in Hearts winning the domestic double. On 2 January 2021, he scored his debut goal for Hearts of Oak, scoring the fourth goal, a spot kick in their 6–1 rout of Bechem United. In early April, he sustained an injury in a match against Aduana Stars keeping him out until June 2021, when he made a substitute appearance in the 3–0 victory in Ghana FA Cup match against his former club Liberty Professionals. In the following match, he was named on the bench in their 1–1 draw against fierce rivals Accra Great Olympics. On his full return from injury, he started and scored a goal in their 2–1 victory over Legon Cities on June 24. At the end of the season, he played 22 league matches and scored 2 goals as Hearts won the 2020–21 Ghana Premier League after a 12-year trophy drought. During the 2021 Ghanaian FA Cup final, he played 111 minutes of full time plus extra time before he was substituted for Emmanuel Nettey as Hearts won the match via a penalty shootout.

In the 2021–22 season, Botchway maintained his role as a key member of the team, playing 23 league matches. He also played the entire 90-minute game as Hearts defeated Bechem United 2–1 in the 2021–22 Ghanaian FA Cup final.

At the end of his two-year stint, he played over 60 matches in all competitions, scored two goals and won five trophies.

=== Adama City ===
Botchway was released by Hearts in August 2022 after being deemed surplus to requirements, but he was eventually called back. He trained with the club until he was sold to newly promoted side Samartex. He signed a two-year contract with the Samreboi-based club. A month after, Botchway was transferred to Ethiopian club Adama City, signing a one-year contract after passing his medical examination.

=== Dynamos F.C ===
Botchway moved to Dynamos FC in 2024, anchoring the midfield and playing 17 games

=== Scottland F.C ===
His exploits earned him a move to Zimbabwe, where he signed for Zimbabwean giants Scottland F.C in summer 2024

== International career ==
Botchway was called up to the Ghana A' national football team, the Local Black Stars ahead of their 2020 CHAN qualifiers and 2019 WAFU Cup of Nations, however he did not make the final squad.

== Personal life ==
Botchway considers former Ghanaian international captain Stephen Appiah who also featured for Accra Hearts of Oak as his idol and inspiration. He grew up in a poor family and due to struggles at the early stages of his football career including have to walk long distances for training and matches he considered quitting football.

== Honours ==
Hearts of Oak

- Ghana Premier League: 2020–21
- Ghana FA Cup: 2021, 2021–22
- Ghana Super Cup: 2021
- President's Cup: 2022

Dynamos F.C

- Chibuku Cup: 2023–24
