= Dominic Eshun =

Ghanaian footballer (born 2000)

Dominic Eshun (born 1 January 2000) is a Ghanaian professional footballer who plays as a midfielder for Ghanaian Premier League side Accra Hearts of Oak. He previously played for Medeama SC and Karela United.

== Club career ==
=== Medeama SC ===
Eshun previously played for Medeama SC. He featured in 2 matches during the 2016 CAF Confederation Cup. He played for the club in the 2016 and 2017 Ghana Premier League seasons. He won the Ghana Super Cup whilst playing for Medeama in 2016.

=== Karela United ===
In 2018, Eshun moved to Western Region-based club Karela United. He played in 8 league matches during the 2018 Ghanaian Premier League season before the league was abandoned due to the dissolution of the GFA in June 2018, as a result of the Anas Number 12 Expose.

=== Hearts of Oak ===
In November 2018, he signed for Accra Hearts of Oak, whilst he was still under contract with Karela United. The In July 2018, he signed a Karela United later reported the case to the Player Status Committee of the GFA. On 2 May 2019, The Player Status Committee ruled in favour of Karela United indicating that the player was still under contract and ordered him to re-join the team. The two clubs later reached an agreement to settle the impasses that surrounded his transfer and he was unveiled on 22 July 2019. He made his debut during the first match of the season on 29 December 2019 which he played the full 90 minutes in an eventual 1–0 loss to Berekum Chelsea. He only featured in 4 league matches in 2019–20 Ghana Premier League season before the league was cancelled as a result of the COVID-19 pandemic. He was named on the club's squad list for the 2020–21 Ghana Premier League season.

== International career ==
Eshun played for the Ghana national under-17 team in 2018.

== Personal life ==
On 19 September 2019, Eshun tied the knot with his girlfriend during the off-season period.

== Honours ==
=== Club ===
Medeama SC

- Ghana Super Cup: 2016

Hearts of Oak

- Ghana Premier League: 2020–21
