= Emmanuel Nettey =

Ghanaian footballer (born 1991)

Personal information
- Date of birth: 28 September 1991 (age 35)
- Place of birth: Nungua, Accra, Ghana
- Height: 1.78 m (5 ft 10 in)
- Position: Midfielder

Youth career
- 2010–2011: Sharks FC
- 2012–2014: Pure Joy Stars

Senior career*
Years	Team	Apps	(Gls)
2015–2017	International Allies	41	(9)
2017–2019	Unistar Soccer Academy	24	(5)
2020–2022	Hearts of Oak	27	(1)
2022	Duhok		
2022–2023	Shabab Sahel	20	(0)
- * Club domestic league appearances and goals as of 22:45, 7 January 2024 (UTC)

Emmanuel Nettey (born 28 September 1991) is a Ghanaian professional footballer who plays as a midfielder.

== Career ==
=== Early career ===
Nettey was born in Nungua, Accra. He started his career at Ghanaian side Sharks F.C. He then moved to Pure Joy Stars, where he was scouted by International Allies after winning the top-scorer award in his second and last season with the club.

=== Inter Allies ===
Nettey joined International Allies on a two-year deal in winter of 2015, he won several accolades including player of the month of Aug/Sept 2015. Nettey later terminated his contract with the Accra-based club after two seasons and joined Unistar Soccer Academy of Kasoa in January 2017.

=== Hearts of Oak ===
He was then bought by Ghana Premier League giants Hearts of Oak in the 2020 transfer window of the Ghana Premier League on a two-year contract. He made his debut on 15 January 2020, starting in a goalless away draw against West African Football Academy. The following match against Liberty Professionals, Nettey played the full 90 minutes and helped Hearts to comeback from a goal down to win the match by 2–1. He was adjudged the man of the match at end. His performance from that match immediately made him a fan's favourite and at the end of the match Hearts fans threw in money from the stands to appreciate him for putting up a good performance. He played 10 league matches as the league was cancelled due to the COVID-19 pandemic in Ghana. Ahead of the 2020–21 season, Nettey was given the number 10 jersey along with a more influential role to play on the pitch. His season however took a bad turn as hearts did not start the season on a good note after going winless in three matches whilst Nettey also got injured ahead of the match day 4. He returned from injury to start a match during the match day 11 game against Great Olympics. He was however replaced with Benjamin Afutu in the 50th minute. Nettey regained his form after the appointment of Samuel Boadu as the head coach in the middle of the season. He went on to play 13 out of 16 league matches in the second round as Hearts made a comeback to win the league after a 12-year drought.

On 8 August, Nettey won the Ghanaian FA Cup following a 8–7 penalty shoot-out victory over Ashanti Gold at Accra Sports Stadium in the final, after a goalless draw in extra-time; Nettey came on in the 111th minute of extra time for Ansah Botchway and converted his attempt in the penalty shootout.

=== Shabab Sahel ===
On 9 July 2022, Nettey joined Shabab Sahel in the Lebanese Premier League.

== Honours ==
Hearts of Oak

- Ghana Premier League: 2020–21
- Ghanaian FA Cup: 2021
