= Tetteh Nortey =

Ghanaian footballer

Mohammed Tetteh
Personal information
- Full name: Mohamed Tetteh Nortey
- Date of birth: 7 July 1990 (age 36)
- Place of birth: Accra, Ghana
- Height: 1.70 m (5 ft 7 in)
- Position: Defensive midfielder

Team information
- Current team: Techiman Eleven Wonders FC
- Number: 4

Youth career
- 2006: Düsseldorf F. C.
- 2007: African United

Senior career*
Years	Team	Apps	(Gls)
2008–2012	Accra Hearts of Oak SC		
2012–2017	King Faisal Babes		
2017-	Elmina Sharks		

International career
2007	Ghana U-17	7	(0)
- * Club domestic league appearances and goals

Mohamed Tetteh Nortey (born 20 November 1990 in Accra) is a Ghanaian football (soccer) player currently playing at the position of defender for Techiman Eleven Wonders FC.

== Career ==
Nortey began his career with Düsseldorf FC Accra, before joined in 2007 to African United and signed than on 11 April 2008 for Accra Hearts of Oak SC.

== International career ==
The left back played for the Black Starlets in 2007 FIFA U-17 World Cup in Korea Republic.
