= Patrick Razak =

Ghanaian footballer

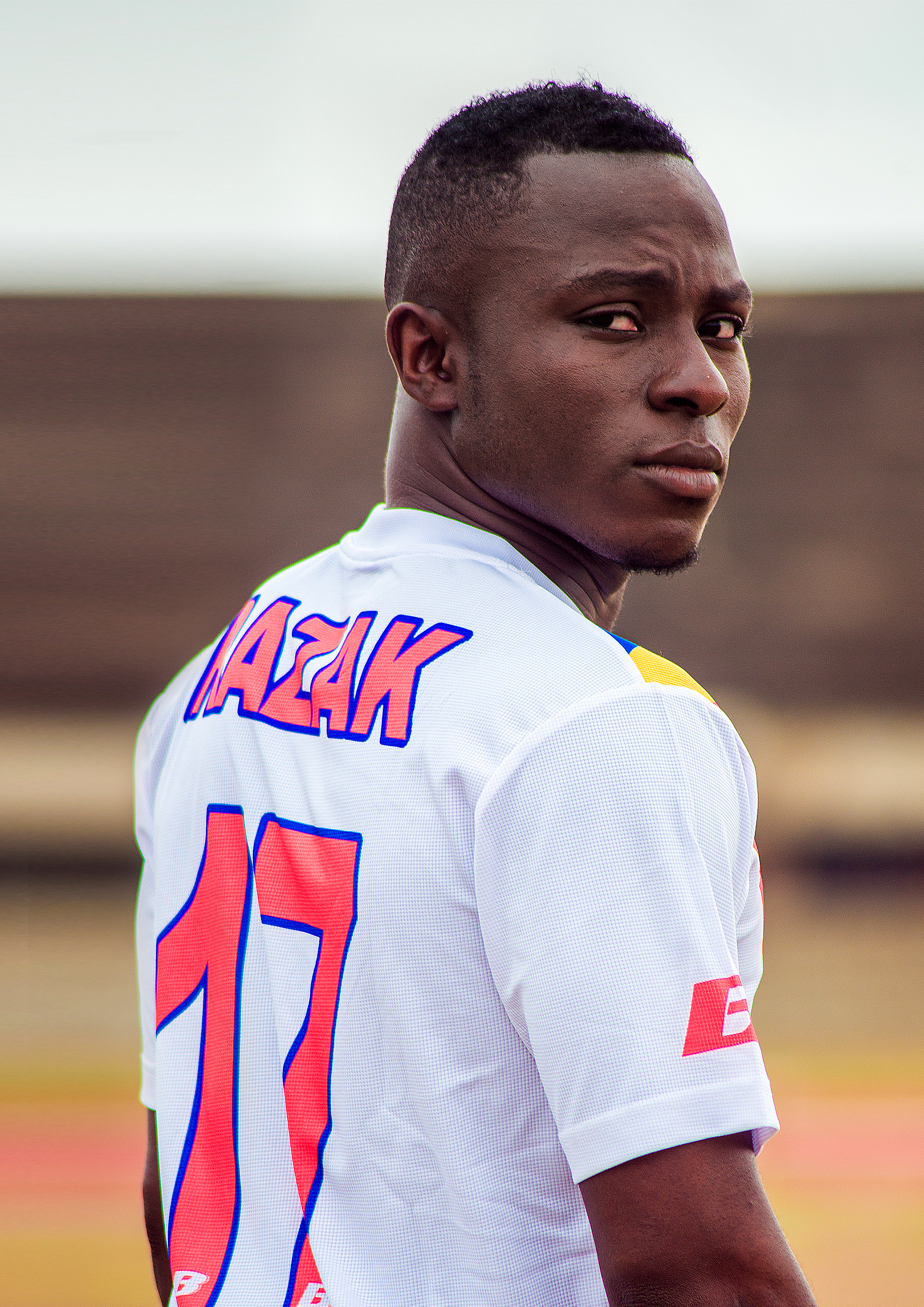
- Patrick Razak of Accra Hearts of Oak.

Personal information
- Full name: Patrick Razak
- Date of birth: 17 June 1995 (age 31)
- Place of birth: Ghana
- Position: Midfielder

Team information
- Current team: Hearts of Oak
- Number: 17

Youth career
- Tamale Utrecht academy

Senior career*
Years	Team	Apps	(Gls)
–2016	Tamale Utrecht academy		
2016–2018	Hearts of Oak	49	(4)
2018–2019	Horoya AC		
2019–	Hearts of Oak	31	(1)
- * Club domestic league appearances and goals as of 17 August 2021

Patrick Razak (born 17 June 1995, Somanya, Ghana) is a Ghanaian professional footballer who plays as a right winger for Ghanaian Premier League side Accra Hearts of Oak. He won the WAFU tournament in November 2017 for Ghana.

== Career ==
=== Early career ===
He started his career with Young Rootz FC, a colt side, and then moved to Garviyietes FC in the Ghana Division Two League before leaving for Wa Bazooka in the a Ghana Division One League side, currently Somanya Bazuka FC in Ghana Division Two League. Razak won the Goal King award at the juvenile inter-regional competition for the Eastern Region in 2008–09, with nine goals.

Razak later played for the Ghanaian Premier League side Wa All Stars before joining the Tamale Utrecht Academy, which he left for Tura Magic, a Namibian top flight side.

=== Hearts of Oak ===
He came back to the Tamale Utrecht academy before leaving for Accra Hearts of Oak ahead of the 2015–16 season. Razak won the Ghana@60 cup with Accra Hearts in 2017 by scoring in the first leg at Accra Sports Stadium. His first stint with Hearts was for two seasons, from 2016 to 2018. In 2018, Hearts agreed on a transfer fee for him to move to Guinean club Horoya.

=== Horoya A.C ===
On 10 October 2018, Razak was signed by Horoya, a top-flight team in Guinea, for a reported fee of $150,000. He signed a two-year contract with club on the CAF transfer deadline day to continue his career. He won the Guinean league in his first season with club. His contract was terminated in November 2019, which due to the fact that over his short stint with club, he struggled to establish himself in the team due to recurring injuries and an overload of players who played in the same role as him including Ghanaian born Burkinabe international Mandela Ocansey.

=== Return to Hearts ===
In August 2020, after staying without a club for nine months, there were reports that he was set to rejoin his former club Hearts of Oak. He finally signed a three-year deal with club in October 2020 ahead of their 2020–21 season after training with them for weeks. Upon his return, he featured in 31 league matches to help Hearts win the coveted league trophy for the first time since 2009 ending a 12-year trophy drought. He also won the Ghanaian FA Cup at the end of the season, after starting in the final and playing 80 minutes before being substituted for Victor Aidoo. The match went into a penalty shootout with Hearts winning by 8–7 after the match ended in a goalless draw at the end of extra time.

== Honours ==
Horoya AC

- Guinée Championnat National: 2018–19

Hearts of Oak

- Ghana Premier League: 2020–21
- Ghanaian FA Cup: 2021

Ghana A'

- WAFU Cup of Nations: 2017
