= Victor Aidoo =

Ghanaian footballer (born 1999)

Personal information
- Full name: Victor Kweku Aidoo
- Date of birth: 1999 (age 26–27)
- Place of birth: Ghana
- Position: Forward

Team information
- Current team: Hearts of Oak
- Number: 3

Senior career*
Years	Team	Apps	(Gls)
–2020	Samartex		(6)
2020–	Hearts of Oak	29	(7)
- * Club domestic league appearances and goals as of 17 August 2021

Victor Kweku Aidoo (born 1999) is a Ghanaian professional footballer who plays as a forward for Ghanaian Premier league side Accra Hearts of Oak.

== Career ==
=== Samartex ===
Aidoo started his career with Ghana Division One League side Samartex. During the 2019–20 Division One League season, he scored 6 goals before the league was truncated due to the COVID-19 pandemic in Ghana. His impressive performance in the lower league caught the attention of several clubs in the Premier League including Hearts of Oak.

=== Hearts of Oak ===
Aidoo joined Hearts of Oak in October 2020 on a three-year contract ahead of the 2020–21 Ghana Premier League season. He made his debut during the first game of the season on 24 November 2020, coming on in the 80th minute to replace Kwadwo Obeng Jnr in the 2–2 draw against Ashanti Gold. He scored his debut goal after scoring a brace in the 6–1 victory over Bechem United on 2 January 2021. He went on to score goals in three consecutive matches, against Elmina Sharks and Eleven Wonders.

On 21 February 2021, he scored a brace of penalties in a 3–2 victory over Cape Coast Ebusua Dwarfs. At the end of the match, he was adjudged as the man of the match. In the first round of the season, he scored 6 goals in 12 league matches and was the leading top scorer for Hearts. At the end his debut season, he scored 7 goals and made 1 assist in 29 league appearances to help Hearts win the Ghana Premier League after 12 years of trophy drought. At the end of the season, the club won the double after beating Ashanti Gold in the final of 2021 Ghanaian FA Cup via a penalty shootout. He converted his penalty, the 7th penalty against Kofi Mensah who he had missed one during the league season to help Hearts stay on track and eventually win the trophy. He described that penalty miss as his worst moment of the season.

== Personal life ==
Aidoo comes from a poor background and had to help out a labourer in a rice farm whilst working as bus conductor popularly known in the twi dialect as ''mate'' just to earn money to take care of himself. He has vowed to one day help young people in the deprived communities in Ghana achieve their goals and aspirations especially young footballers.

== Honours ==
Hearts of Oak

- Ghana Premier League: 2020–21
- Ghanaian FA Cup: 2021
