= James Sewornu =

Ghanaian professional footballer

James Sewornu (born 25 July 1999) is a Ghanaian professional footballer who plays as a defender for Ghanaian Premier League side Accra Hearts of Oak.

== Career ==
=== Auroras FC ===
Sewornu started his career with Accra Hearts of Oak junior side Auroras FC who play in the Ghana Division Two League. He played for the side until December 2017, when he was promoted. In the 2017 season he played 20 league matches and picked up only one booking.

=== Hearts of Oak ===
In May 2018, Sewornu was promoted fully into the senior team as signed his first professional contract for Hearts of Oak. In April 2020, during the second transfer period, he signed a 6-months loan deal with King Faisal Babes as the clubs waited for the resumption of the 2019–20 Ghana Premier League season after it was put on hold as a result of the COVID-19 pandemic, but the league was later cancelled in July 2020. Ahead of the 2020–21 Ghana Premier League season, he was named on the club's squad list for the season. He made his debut that season on 24 February 2021, playing the full 90 minutes in a 1–0 win against Liberty Professionals. He had been named several times on the bench before making his debut.

== Honours ==
Hearts of Oak

- Ghana Premier League: 2020–21
- Ghanaian FA Cup: 2021
