= Abdul Manaf Umar =

Ghanaian professional footballer

Abdul Manaf Umar Gumah is a Ghanaian professional footballer who plays as a midfielder for Ghanaian Premier league side Nsoatreman.

== Career ==
Manaf started his career with Accra Hearts of Oak junior side Auroras FC who play in the Ghana Division Two League. In January 2019, he was promoted by coach Kim Grant as he signed his first professional contract for Hearts of Oak ahead of the 2019 GFA Normalization Committee Special Competition. In July 2019, he extended contract with the club.

In 2023, he joined Nsoatreman.

== Honours ==
Hearts of Oak

- Ghana Premier League: 2020–21
- Ghanaian FA Cup: 2021
