= Abdourahmane Mamane =

Nigerien footballer

Abdourahamane Mamane
Personal information
- Full name: Abdourahamane Mamane Lawali
- Date of birth: 8 March 1997 (age 29)
- Place of birth: Niamey, Niger
- Height: 1.89 m (6 ft 2 in)
- Position: Defensive midfielder

Team information
- Current team: Accra Hearts of Oak
- Number: 15

Senior career*
Years	Team	Apps	(Gls)
2015–2018	Douanes	15	(4)
2018–2019	JS Tahoua		
2019–2020	Al-Merrikh	22	(2)
2020–2021	Accra Hearts of Oak	6	(1)

International career
2019–	Niger	2	(0)
- * Club domestic league appearances and goals

Abdourahamane Mamane Lawali (born 8 March 1997) is a Nigerien footballer who plays as a defensive midfielder for Accra Hearts of Oak of Ghana Premier League.

== Club career ==
In March 2020, Mamane joined Ghanaian club Accra Hearts of Oak on a two-year contract. He scored his debut goal for Hearts after scoring the 5th goal from an assist from Frederick Ansah Botchway to push Hearts to a massive 6–1 victory over Bechem United.

== International career ==
Mamane made his debut for Niger on 10 September 2019 against Morocco.

== Honours ==
=== Club ===
AS Douanes

- Niger Premier League: 2016, 2017
- Niger Cup: 2015

Al-Merrikh

- Sudan Premier League: 2019–20

Hearts of Oak

- Ghana Premier League: 2020–21
