= Richard Attah =

Ghanaian professional footballer

Personal information
- Date of birth: 9 April 1995 (age 31)
- Place of birth: Ghana
- Position: Goalkeeper

Team information
- Current team: Hearts of Oak
- Number: 31

Senior career*
Years	Team	Apps	(Gls)
2017–2019	Elmina Sharks	30	(0)
2020–	Hearts of Oak	22	(0)
- * Club domestic league appearances and goals as of 3 March 2021

Richard Attah (born 9 April 1995) is a Ghanaian professional footballer who plays as a goalkeeper for Ghanaian Premier league side Accra Hearts of Oak.

== Career ==
Richard Attah started his football career with Eastern Region-based division one club Okyeman Planners F.C. He later moved to Central Region base Elmina Sharks in 2017 and after spending 2 seasons with Elmina Sharks he then moved to Accra Hearts of Oak in 2019.

== International career ==
Attah was part of the Ghana National team in the 2021 Africa Cup of Nations that was eliminated at the group stage of the competition.

== Honours ==
Hearts of Oak

- Ghana Premier League: 2020–21
- Ghanaian FA Cup: 2021
