= Isaac Mensah (footballer, born 2002) =

Ghanaian professional footballer

Isaac Mensah (born 7 February 2002) is a Ghanaian professional footballer who plays as a forward for Ghanaian Premier league side Accra Hearts of Oak.

== Career ==
Mensah started his career with youth side Royals SC at Konongo in the Ashanti region. He later moved to Ghana Division One League side Nkoranza Warriors. Before the leagues in Ghana were truncated due to the COVID-19 pandemic, he had scored 8 goals including scoring 4 goals in match against Yendi Gbewaa FC. He moved to Hearts of Oak in July 2020 ahead of the 2020–21 Ghana Premier League season. As at 7 March 2021, he had scored 3 goals in the league.

== Honours ==
Hearts of Oak

- Ghana Premier League: 2020–21
- Ghanaian FA Cup: 2021
