= Richmond Ayi =

Ghanaian professional footballer (born 1997)

Richmond Ayi (born 4 June 1997) is a Ghanaian professional footballer who plays as a goalkeeper for Ghanaian Premier League side Accra Hearts of Oak.

== Career ==
Ayi started his football career with Bono Region-based division one club Techiman City FC. He featured for the club in the 2016 Ghanaian Premier League. He later moved to Volta Region-based West African Football Academy (WAFA) in 2017 and after spending 2 seasons with WAFA he then moved to Accra Hearts of Oak in 2019.

== International career ==
Ayi played for the Ghana national under-23 football team from 2018 to 2019. He was a member of the squad that featured for Ghana at the 2019 Africa U-23 Cup of Nations.

== Honours ==
Hearts of Oak

- Ghana Premier League: 2020–21
- Ghanaian FA Cup: 2021
