= Nii Lamptey =

Ghanaian footballer and manager

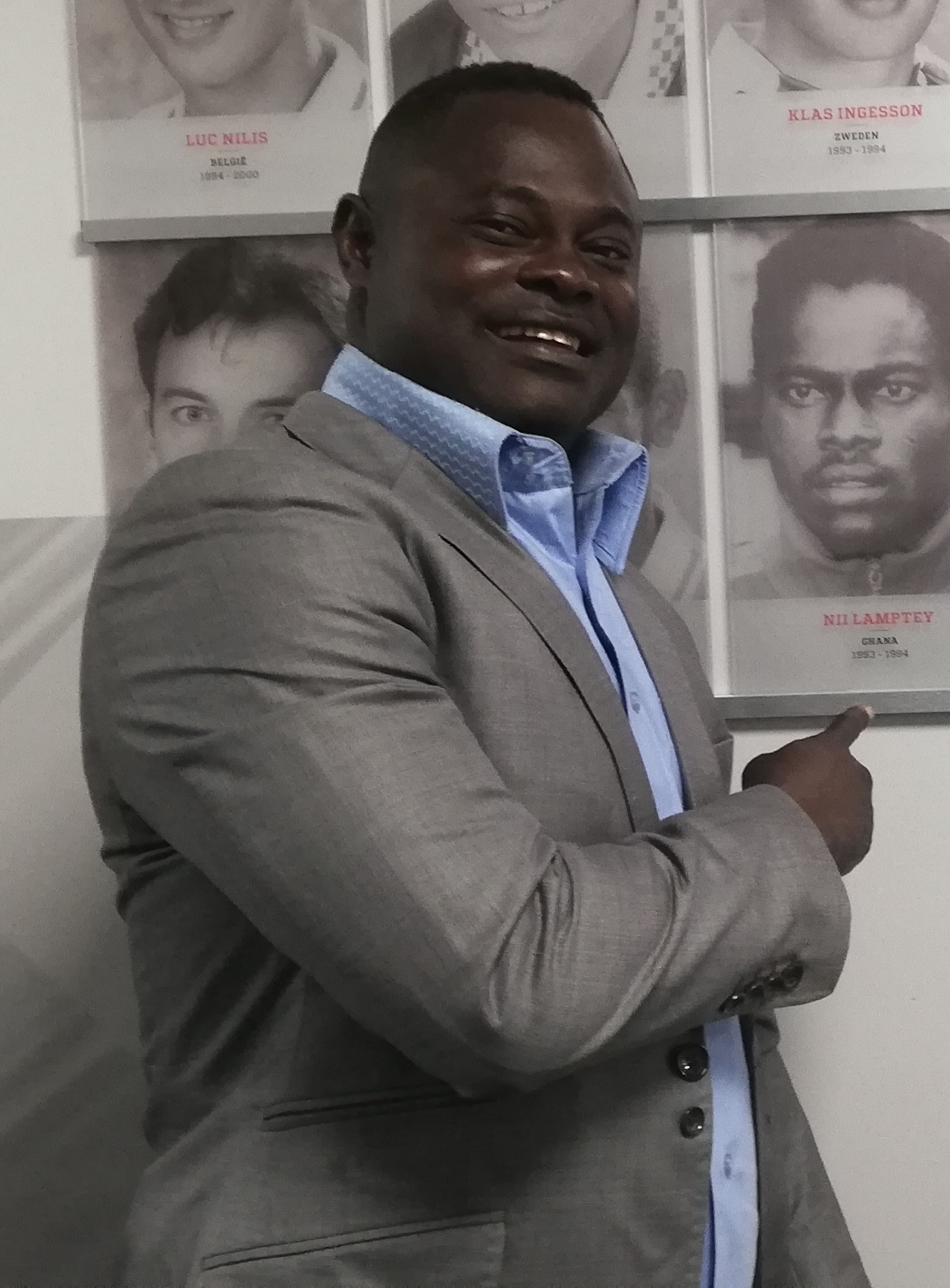
- Lamptey in 2019

Personal information
- Full name: Nii Odartey Lamptey
- Date of birth: 10 December 1974 (age 51)
- Place of birth: Tema, Ghana
- Height: 1.70 m (5 ft 7 in)
- Position: Midfielder

Team information
- Current team: Elmina Sharks (head coach)

Youth career
- Young Corners

Senior career*
Years	Team	Apps	(Gls)
1990–1995	Anderlecht	30	(9)
1993–1994	→ PSV (loan)	22	(10)
1994–1995	Aston Villa	10	(0)
1995–1996	Coventry City	6	(0)
1996–1997	Venezia	5	(0)
1997	Boca Juniors	0	(0)
1997	→ Unión Santa Fe (loan)	6	(0)
1997–1998	Ankaragücü	10	(1)
1998–1999	União Leiria	7	(0)
1999–2001	Greuther Fürth	36	(5)
2001–2002	Shandong Luneng	37	(7)
2003–2004	Al-Nasr Dubai	?	(?)
2005–2006	Asante Kotoko	?	(?)
2006–2008	Jomo Cosmos	?	(?)
Total		169	(32)

International career
1991–1996	Ghana	38	(8)

Managerial career
- 2009: Sekondi Wise Fighters (assistant coach)
- 2021: Elmina Sharks (head coach)
- * Club domestic league appearances and goals

Medal record

Men's association football

Representing Ghana

Olympic Games
Bronze medal – third place	1992 Barcelona	Team competition

Nii Odartey Lamptey (born 10 December 1974) is a Ghanaian former professional footballer and current manager of Elmina Sharks as well as the proprietor of a school in Accra called Glow-Lamp International School. During his career he played as a striker from 1990 until 2008 notably for Aston Villa, PSV Eindhoven, Coventry City and the Ghana national football team.

He is known foremost for his erratic career, in which he became a superstar as a teenager and then suffered a long string of failures which burnt him out well before his time. Lamptey has been used as a byword for a cautionary tale of putting too much pressure on young players to be successful.

He also played for Anderlecht, Venezia, Boca Juniors, Unión Santa Fe, Ankaragücü, União Leiria, Greuther Fürth, Shandong Luneng, Al-Nassr, Asante Kotoko and Jomo Cosmos.

== Early years ==
Nii Lamptey was born in Tema, but grew up in the two biggest Ghanaian cities, Accra and Kumasi. He had a miserable childhood, as his parents abused and neglected him. His father was an alcoholic who often beat and lashed him and sometimes burnt his body with cigarettes. Lamptey often refused to spend the nights home and frequently skipped school, only finding refuge in football. Soon, he began to excel in this sport, despite his father heckling him and hurling verbal abuse from the sidelines whenever he watched his son play football.

When Lamptey was eight, his parents divorced, and his stepfather threw him out of the household. Lamptey found refuge in a Muslim football camp and converted from Christianity to Islam to qualify for entry. When his stepfather found this out, he accused his stepson of sacrilege and often quarreled in front of the football camp.

== Club career ==
=== Anderlecht ===
Lamptey played for the youth team Young Corners in Accra, but wanted to move abroad to play. However, the Ghanaian FA refused and confiscated his passport, wishing to build a team around him in Ghana. He therefore was smuggled into Nigeria by a taxi driver, where he met Nigerian captain Stephen Keshi, who had heard of his skills. Keshi persuaded Lamptey to play in Belgium with him, and took Lamptey with him, giving him a fake Nigerian passport that stated Lamptey was his son.

He was hailed as the new Pelé and age limit rules in Belgium were changed to allow him to debut at the age of 16 for Anderlecht.

His first season was a success, scoring 7 goals in 14 games. His goal for Anderlecht against Roma in March 1991 in the UEFA Cup still holds the record of the youngest goalscorer in European club tournament history.

=== PSV Eindhoven ===
He was loaned to Eindhoven, and quickly established himself as a prolific scorer, and continued to impress, scoring 10 times in 22 games.

=== Aston Villa ===
Ron Atkinson brought Lamptey to Aston Villa in the summer of 1994. This move came as a surprise, as PSV was a more successful club than Aston Villa at the time and Lamptey was one of the star players at PSV. However, Lamptey had signed an exclusive marketing contract with an Italian player agent. The player's agent, Antonio Caliendo, would get 25% of whatever Lamptey's transfer fee was, and accordingly sold him to Villa as that would mean the largest commission for himself. Lamptey's illiteracy allowed Caliendo to take advantage of him, even pocketing a signing on bonus intended for Lamptey. He failed to impress at Villa Park, scoring just three times, all of which came in the League Cup against Wigan Athletic (once in the home leg and twice in the away leg).

=== Coventry City ===
Following Atkinson's dismissal as Villa boss, he re-signed Lamptey for his new club Coventry City. Again Lamptey would score his only goals in the League Cup, netting twice against Hull City (once in the home leg and once in the away leg). However, despite his failure at Coventry, his name was not forgotten. From the start of the 2012–13 season, a group of Coventry City fans launched a podcast entitled The Nii Lamptey Show in honour of their former player.

=== Later career ===
Lamptey joined Venezia in Italy. Later, he was signed by Boca Juniors and went on loan at that same year at Unión de Santa Fe in Argentina. There, he and his wife had their third child, Diego. But soon, Diego died of a rare disease. A major emotional blow was also the fact that Lamptey wanted to bury his son in Ghana, but the authorities declined. Heartbroken, Lamptey temporarily gave up football. After unsuccessful stints at Ankaragücü and União Leiria, Lamptey got himself a new German player agent who transferred him to SpVgg Greuther Fürth. However, Lamptey and his wife were unhappy there, unable to live through the culture shock in Germany. Lamptey was not entirely unsuccessful, being a reliable backup, but was found too fragile for the rough 2. Bundesliga. He was also reportedly ignored by his German colleagues, and once, a colleague flat-out refused to sleep in the same hotel room as him. This blatant racism shocked Lamptey, but even worse was the fact that his child Lisa also died soon after birth. Also Lamptey's second dead child was buried abroad, in Germany. The Lampteys soon left for Asia.

Lamptey then joined Shandong Luneng Tai Shan in China.

On 5 March 2007, Lamptey signed for South African side Jomo Cosmos.

== International career ==
=== Youth ===
==== 1991 U-17 World Cup ====
Lamptey first began to attract global attention in 1991. He led Ghana to win the 1991 FIFA U-17 World Championship with the team known as the Black Starlets after playing in the 1989 version as a 15-year-old. He won the FIFA Best Player of the tournament – the Golden Ball award in a competition that also included Argentina's Juan Sebastian Verón and Marcelo Gallardo and Italy's Alessandro del Piero, Lamptey's star shone more brilliantly than them all, as he dominated everyone in the competition. He was subsequently touted as the next Pelé; by Pelé himself. He scored four goals in that tournament. Lamptey later stated that although appreciated, Pelé's praise made life far harder for him, since everyone therefore had extremely high expectations of him that he was not always able to fulfill.

The Adidas Golden Ball could only go to one of the members of the victorious Ghanaian side with Lamptey taking home the award from his Italian sojourn. According to a FIFA.com article, "Lamptey was the beating heart of a very good side. His fast feet, speed of thought, and clever interplay with captain Alex Opoku and fellow midfielders Mohammed Gargo and Emmanuel Duah were on display for all to see. His willingness to get into the box was critical too, and his four goals made him joint top-goalscorer."

In recognition of his exquisite football he displayed at the FIFA U-17 Tournament, he was named the 1991 fifth best African Footballer of the Year.

==== 1993 U-20 World Cup ====
Lamptey's led Ghana's U-20 team, known as the "Black Satellites," to win the 1993 African U-20 Cup of Nations and then lost the final of the 1993 FIFA World Youth Championship held in Australia to Brazil, who came from a goal down to win the trophy at the death, 2–1. He also scored in the match.

==== Summer Olympics ====
In the Summer of 1992, young superstar Nii Lamptey led Ghana to win a Bronze medal at the Barcelona 1992 Summer Olympics football tournament. Ghana, who had the youngest team by far in the competition (the average age of the squad was 18.8 years), were surprise bronze medallists, becoming the first African nation to earn a medal. They did so in a 1–0 victory over yet another surprise, Australia.

=== Senior ===
His international career with Ghana dried up after he was sent off in the 1996 African Cup of Nations semi-final game.

== Retirement ==
Lamptey retired from football in 2008. He now breeds cattle and sheep on a farm on the outskirts of Accra. He served as a pundit on Ghanaian television during the 2014 World Cup.

He also founded Glow-lamp International School, so as to give back to society and ensure than children have the chance to learn to read and write: something he was never able to do. As of 2017, his school has almost 400 pupils. He also has a football academy called Glow Lamp Soccer Academy specifically located at Abreshia (on the Atabaadze-Agona road) near Elmina.

Lamptey has said that despite everything, he does not feel like a loser, but rather as a hardened survivor who refuses to be destroyed, and whom God will not punish.

== Personal life ==
Lamptey married Gloria Appiah in 1993. The marriage was a controversial one, angering his brothers, as Appiah is Fante, while Lamptey is Gã-Dangme. He had five children, of whom two died to lung diseases. However, a DNA test revealed he was not the biological father of the remaining three children and he divorced Appiah. She filed for an appeal in court, requesting 50% of his assets in the divorce including occupancy at the couple's East Legon apartment, but was refused by the judge.

As of 2016, Lamptey is engaged to actress and model Ruweida Yakuba with whom he has two children.

He has had a feud with Ghanaian star Abedi Pele, but refuses to disclose the reason.

== Coaching career ==
On 19 February 2009 signed a contract as Assistant at Sekondi Wise Fighters; here he assisted the new Head Coach Charles Akonnor. He also owns a football academy at Abreshia near Elmina that he coaches at.

== Career statistics ==
=== International ===
Scores and results list Ghana's goal tally first, score column indicates score after each Lamptey goal.

List of international goals scored by Nii Lamptey
No.	Date	Venue	Opponent	Score	Result	Competition
1	29 April 1991	Accra Sports Stadium, Accra, Ghana	Togo	1–0	2–0	1992 Africa Cup of Nations qualification
2	14 July 1994	Kobe Universiade Memorial Stadium, Kobe, Japan	Japan	1–2	1–2	Friendly
3	30 November 1994	Boet Erasmus Stadium, Port Elizabeth, South Africa	Cameroon	1–0	1–0	Friendly

== Honours ==
Anderlecht

- Belgian First Division: 1990–91, 1992–93

Asante Kotoko

- Ghana Premier League: 2005

Ghana U-17

- FIFA U-17 World Championship: 1991

Ghana U-20

- African U-20 Cup of Nations: 1993
- FIFA World Youth Championship runner-up: 1993

Ghana U-23

- Football at the Summer Olympics bronze medal: 1992
