= Caleb Amankwah =

Ghanaian professional footballer

Caleb Amankwah (born 15 October 1997) is a Ghanaian professional footballer who plays as a defender for Ethiopian Premier league side CBE SA.

== Career ==
Amankwah moved to Accra Hearts of Oak on 12 March 2021 on a free transfer. Amankwah previously played for Aduana Stars and WAFA.

In August 2023, Caleb secured a move to Ethiopian Premier league side CBE SA (a.k.a. Ethiopia Nigd Bank) from Accra Hearts of Oak. Caleb Amankwah moving to Commercial Bank FC of Ethiopia

== Honours ==
Hearts of Oak

- Ghana Premier League: 2020–21
- Ghanaian FA Cup: 2021
