= 2021–22 Ghana FA Cup =

42nd season of Ghana's primary cup competition

2022 Ghanaian FA Cup
Tournament details
- Country: Ghana
- Teams: 110 (all)

Final positions
- Champions: Accra Hearts of Oak
- Runners-up: Bechem United

The 2022–23 Ghana FA Cup was the 42nd season of the Ghana FA Cup, the primary knockout competition in Ghanaian football. Sponsored by MTN Ghana for the 12th straight season, thus called the "MTN FA Cup" for sponsorship purposes, Accra Hearts of Oak were the defending Champions.

== Format ==
A total of 110 clubs consisting of 18 Premier League Clubs, 48 Division One League Clubs and 44 Division Two League Clubs from the Regional Football Associations would participate the competition.

The preliminary round stage of the cup would be played between the 48 Division One Clubs and 44 Division Two clubs totalling 92 clubs across the country. The Winners of the preliminary round will progress to the round of 64 where they would be drawn against the 18 Premier League clubs.

The Winner of the MTN FA Cup shall represent Ghana in the 2022–23 CAF Confederation Cup.

== Sponsorship ==
In June 2021, MTN renewed their sponsorship for the competition for three extra years with GHS4 million. StarImes also is set to contribute $200,000 as part of their full $1,000,000.00 for the entire 2021–22 football season for the second year of the sponsorship deal with the Ghana Football Association.

== Preliminary round ==
The draw for the preliminary round was made on 25 November 2021. Only second tier and third tier teams joined the round, as the Premier League teams received a bye from the round.

Tie	Home team (tier)	Score	Away team (tier)	Att.
1	Bolga FC (3)	1–0	Bolga Soccer Stars (3)	
2	Sombo Freedom Stars (3)	4–2	Ziko babies (3)	
3	Pro Players Academy (3)	2–1	New Edubiase United (2)	
4	Sekondi Eleven Wise FC (3)	3–1	Nkwantaman FC (3)	
5	Koforidua Suhyen (3)	2–1	Okwawu United (3)	
6	Jinijini Eagle Soccer Academy (3)	2–1	Dumasua Delsanco FC (3)	
7	Heart of Lions FC (2)	1–0	Home Stars FC (3)	
8	Bis Paradise (3)	1–5	Nzema Kotoko FC (2)	
9	Aboi Young Stars FC (3)	2–0	Akropongman United (3)	
10	Sene Horspurs FC (3)	3–2	Nkoranza Warriors (2)	
11	Brong Ahafo United (2)	0–1	Bofoakwa Tano FC (2)	
12	Allakoso FC (3)	0–1	Nsoatreman FC (2)	
13	Wamanafo Mighty Royals (2)	1–2	Unity FC (2)	
14	Berekum Arsenal (2)	1–0	Baffour Soccer Academy (2)	
15	Steadfast FC (2)	3–0	Tamale Soccer Angels (3)	
16	STK Stars (3)	0–2	Tamale City FC (2)	
17	Wa Yaasin Juniors (2)	3–2	Adansi United (3)	
18	Wassaman United (2)	1–1 (4–5 p)	Asokwa Deportivo FC (2)	
19	Kumawuman United (3)	1–0	Pacific Heroes FC (2)	
20	Police Nationals (3)	2–1	Soccer Intellectuals FC (2)	
21	Ebusua Dwarfs FC (2)	2–0	Cheetah FC (3)	
22	Kingdom FC (3)	0–3	Swedru All Blacks (2)	
23	Susubiribi SC (2)	0–1	Port City (3)	

Tie	Home team (tier)	Score	Away team (tier)	Att.
24	Kwaebibirem United (2)	0–1	Krystal Palace FC (2)	
25	Mobile Phone People (3)	0–0(?–? p)	Nania FC (2)	
26	Ghana Army FC (3)	0–0(?–? p)	Accra City Stars (2)	
27	New Life FC (3)	1–3	Golden Kicks (2)	
28	Vision FC (2)	2–0	Na God FC (3)	
29	Liberty Professionals (2)	1–0	Uncle 'T' FC (2)	
30	Bolga Allstars (2)	2–0	Bawku AC Milan (3)	
31	Tema Youth (2)	5–0	New Town Youth (3)	
32	Tudu Mighty Jets (2)	1–1(?–? p)	Real Athletico (3)	
33	Berekum Freedom Fighters (3)	3–1	Kintampo FC (2)	
34	Dreams Tamale (2)	2–0	Sankara Nationals (3)	
35	Sasaamo Panin FC (3)	3–3(?–? p)	BYF Academy (2)	
36	First Klass FC (3)	1–0	Future Stars (2)	
37	UCC Young Stars (3)	0–1	Achiken FC (2)	
38	Young Apostles (2)	1–0	Bectero Sasana FC (3)	
39	Sekondi Hasaacas FC (2)	2–1	FC Samartex (2)	
40	Skyy FC (2)	5–0	Basake Holy Stars FC (2)	
41	Apam Ahenfo Cosfi (3)	1–3	Unistar Academy (2)	
42	Young Wise (2)	0–2	Inter Allies FC (2)	
43	Kotoku Royals FC (2)	1–0	Great Warriors (3)	
44	Wa United FC (3)	0–0 (?–?) p)	Wa Suntaa SC (2)	
45	Volta Rangers (3)	(?–? p)	Akatsi All Stars(2)	
46	Roberto FC (3)	1–3	Sons of Thunder FC (3)	
