= Nsoatreman F.C. =

Ghanaian football club

- Full name: Nsoatreman Football Club
- Founded: 2021
- Ground: Nana Konamansah Park
- Capacity: 2,000
- Manager: Yaw Preko
- Website: www.nsoatremanfc.com

Nsoatreman Football Club is a Ghanaian professional football club based at Nsoatre, Bono Region that competes in the Ghana Premier League, the top-flight of Ghanaian football. It plays its home matches at the Nana Konamansah Park astroturf.

== History ==
Founded in 2021, they won the Ghana Division One league title in their maiden season and got promoted to the Ghana Premier League for the 2021–22 season.

In 2024, Nsoatreman won their first ever trophy as winners of the Ghana FA Cup, defeating Bofoakwa Tano 5–4 on penalties.

== Founding and board members ==
On 9 September 2022 Nsoatreman F.C. unveiled their board members and technical staff to see the smooth running of the team and achieve success as a debutant in the Ghana Premier League. Their board members comprise legislators, traditional leaders and business executives.

Founding and board members
| Name | Position |
|---|---|
| Hon. Ignatius Baffuor Awuah | Executive board chair |
| Hon. Edwin Nii Lamptey | Board member |
| Hon. Joseph Kudjoe | Board member |
| Hon. Osei Kyei Mensah | Board member |
| Mr. Agnes Oforiwaa | Board member |
| Mr. Aziz Abubakar | Board member |
| Mr George Ampaabeng | Board member |
| Nana Kwaku Bosompim II | Board member |
| Dr Mustapha Abdul-Hamid | Board member |
| Mr Kingsley Antwi | Board member |
| Dr Thomas Kyeremeh | Board member |
| Mr Yaw Owusu Brempong | Board member |

== Players ==
Note: Flags indicate national team as defined under FIFA eligibility rules; some limited exceptions apply. Players may hold more than one non-FIFA nationality.

| No. | Pos. | Nation | Player |
|---|---|---|---|
| 16 | GK | GHA | Daniel Afadzwu |
| 25 | GK | GHA | Votere Denis |
| 15 | DF | GHA | Anokye Morrison |
| 27 | DF | GHA | Mohammed Issaka |
| 33 | DF | GHA | Eric Osei Bonsu |
| 40 | DF | GHA | Asokwah Ransford |
| 2 | MF | GHA | Walid Fuseini |
| 5 | MF | GHA | Mohammed Sadat |
| 7 | MF | GHA | Kwabena Meider |
| 14 | MF | GHA | Abdul Manaf Umar |
| 19 | MF | GHA | Caleb Asamoah |
| 10 | FW | GHA | Stephen Diyou |
| 21 | FW | GHA | Osafo Antwi |
| 23 | FW | GHA | Mohammed Abdul Rahman |

| No. | Pos. | Nation | Player |
|---|---|---|---|
| 50 | GK | GHA | Farouk Umar |
| 6 | DF | GHA | Obed Duah Anford |
| 26 | DF | GHA | Abbey Nathaniel |
| 30 | DF | GHA | Sule Muntalla |
| 55 | DF | GHA | Acquaye Bortey |
| 4 | MF | GHA | Samuel Kwabena |
| 8 | MF | GHA | Fidaus Mohammed |
| 20 | MF | GHA | Ushau Abu |
| 23 | MF | GHA | Philip Ofori |
| 28 | MF | GHA | Mark Agyekum |
| 36 | MF | GHA | Emmanuel Amoah |
| 3 | FW | GHA | Gyan Prince Adu |
| 9 | FW | GHA | Bismark Kyeremeh |
| 12 | FW | GHA | Ebenezer Nyan |
| 35 | FW | GHA | Collins Kudjoe |

== Honours ==
- Ghana Division One
  - Champions (1): 2021
- Ghana FA Cup
  - Winners (1): 2024
