= Ghana Football Awards =

Annual association football awards

Ghana Football Awards is an annual award scheme organized to recognize the best Ghanaian players playing in and outside of the country and key stakeholders who contribute significantly to the game. Several category of awards are given to the most outstanding performers of the season under review. The awards are presented in July each year at a special gala in Accra, Ghana.

== History ==
In 2018 the AE Mediacom together with a group of creative content producers together with a sports journalist birthed the first-ever Ghana Football Awards, which was officially launched in May 2018 and had its first edition in July 2018 to birth the first-ever Ghana Football Awards. The award scheme was officially launched in May 2018 and had its first edition in July 2018. The scheme held in the July to take advantage of the pre-season period which would see most of Ghanaian footballers playing outside the country back home for the holidays.

== Leadership ==
The award scheme is led by governing board made up of (Ghanaian players) Augustine Ahinful, Abukari Damba, John Paintsil, Alex Kotey (referee) and Karl Tufuoh (sports journalist). The board was chaired by Karl Tufuoh.

== Award Structure and Categories ==
The Awards feature nine major competitive categories and three special awards solely determined by the board. Selection for these awards are made by a board, an electoral college and the public. The shortlisted nominations for each category is determined by the board, with the winners determined by an electoral college (consisting of journalists, coaches and captains of national teams and top-flight Ghanaian clubs) and the general public. The winners are determined in a votes ratio of 80% to 20% for the electoral college and the public respectively.

The voting process is audited by PricewaterhouseCoopers (PwC).

=== Awards ===
- Team of the year
- Goal of the year
- Goalkeeper of the year
- Coach of the year
- Future Star of the year
- Women’s footballer of the year
- Home-Based player of the year
- Foreign-Based player of the year
- Ghana Footballer of the Year

=== Special awards ===
- The Living Legend Award
- The Thumbs Up Award
- The Ghana Dream Team

== See also ==
- Ghana Player of the Year
- CAF Awards
- Globe Soccer Awards
- List of sport awards
