= Okwawu United S.C. =

Okwawu United F.C.
- Nickname: Asaase Aban
- Founded: 1975
- Ground: Nkawkaw Sports Stadium
- Owner: Daasebre Akuamoah Agyapong II
- Manager: Prince Yaw Owusu
- League: Division One League
- Website: https://okwawuunitedfc.com

Okwawu United is a Ghanaian professional football club based in Nkawkaw, Eastern Region. They are competing in the Division One League. Their home stadium is Nkawkaw Stadium.
