= Samuel Boadu =

Ghanaian association football manager (born 1986)

Personal information
- Full name: Samuel Boadu
- Date of birth: 24 February 1986 (age 40)
- Place of birth: Kumasi, Ghana
- Positions: Centre-back; midfielder

Senior career*
Years	Team	Apps	(Gls)
2000–2001	GHAPOHA		
2001–2003	Berekum Arsenal		
2003–2007	Prestea Mine Stars		
2007–2008	ASFA Yennenga		

Managerial career
- 2008: Fantomas FC
- 2008–2009: FC Porto (Ghana)
- 2015: Honeymoon FC
- 2015: Latex Foam FC
- 2017: Shooting Stars FC
- 2013–2018: Asokwa Deportivo
- 2018–2021: Medeama S.C.
- 2018–2021: Ghana U-15
- 2021–2022: Accra Hearts of Oak
- 2021–2022: Ghana U-20 (assistant coach)
- * Club domestic league appearances and goals

Samuel Boadu (born 24 February 1986) is a Ghanaian professional football manager and former player who last served as the head coach of Accra Hearts of Oak S.C. in the Ghana Premier League and serves as the assistant coach of the Ghana national U-20 team. He previously coached Tarkwa-based club Medeama S.C. and the Ghana national U-15 team.

== Early life and education ==
Born on 24 February 1986 in Kumasi, Samuel Boadu hails from Tepa in the Ashanti Region of Ghana. He was educated at the Adum Presbyterian Basic School and Kumasi High School. He played on his high school's football team. He attended Kumasi Polytechnic (now Kumasi Technical University) where he obtained an HND in Purchase and Supply. He attended coaching courses held by the Confederation of African Football and the Ghana Football Association, from where he obtained his certification.

== Playing career ==
Boadu played for Real Ambassadors, a Colts club at Tema, RTU Colts Club, Kumasi, Division Two club, Ahmadiyya Stars, Ashanti Heroes and Division One club, Bibiani Gold Stars. He played in the Ghana Premier League with GHAPOHA (2000–2001), Berekum Arsenal (2001–2003) and Prestea Mines Stars (2003–2007). He played for the Burkinabé football club, ASFA Yennenga. An injury in 2008 ended his playing career. In his playing days, he was a utility player, playing in both central defender and midfielder positions.

== Coaching career ==
In his early career, Boadu coached Kumasi-based Colts club, Fantomas FC in 2008. He guided Shooting Stars FC to the Ashanti Regional Second Division Middle League Final in 2017. He also coached Honeymoon FC and Latex Foam FC to the 2015 Middle League Final as well as FC Porto, a Division Two club that made it to the finals in the 2008/09 Middle League. For five seasons, he was the coach of Division One League side, Asokwa Deportivo.

== Managerial career ==
=== Accra Hearts of Oak ===
Prior to signing for Accra Heart of Oak, Boadu coached Ghana Premier League side, Medeama S.C. for 3 years. On 1 March 2021, the board of Hearts of Oak announced that he had signed a 3.5-year contract with the club, with the task of winning the Ghana Premier League in his first full season, and guiding the club into the CAF Champions League in the future.

=== Ghana U-20 ===
Boadu previously served as head coach of the Ghana national U-15 team, before being promoted to assistant coach of the Ghana national U-20 team in April 2021.

== Personal life ==
Samuel Boadu has a son. He married Felicia Apimpanta in August 2021.

== Honours ==
Accra Hearts of Oak

- Ghana Premier League: 2020–21
- Ghanaian FA Cup: 2021 2022
- Ghana Super Cup: 2021
- President's Cup: 2022

Individual

- Ghana Premier League Coach of the Month: May 2021, June 2021
- Ghana Football Awards Men's Coach of the Year: 2021
- GPL NASCO Coach of the Season: 2020–21
