= Ghana Super Cup =

Ghanaian football super cup game

- Founded: 1996; 30 years ago
- Region: Ghana
- Teams: 2
- Current champions: Krobea Asante Kotoko
- Most championships: Krobea Asante Kotoko (4 times)
- 2022 Ghana Super Cup

The Ghana Super Cup is a football competition involving a match played between the champion of the Ghana Premier League and the winner of the Ghanaian FA Cup in Ghana. The first Ghana Super Cup competition took place in the 1996–1997 season, after which there was a thirteen-year hiatus between the 1998 and 2010 seasons. Kumasi Asante Kotoko is the most successful club in the competition's history.

The current cup holders are Kumasi Asante Kotoko , champions of the 2024-25 Ghanaian FA Cup

== Winners ==
Year	Winner	Score	Finalist	Ref.
1997	Hearts of Oak	1–0	Ghapoha	
1998	Hearts of Oak	2–1	Asante Kotoko	
2011	FC Nania	1–1 (4–3 pen.)	Berekum Chelsea	
2012	Asante Kotoko	2–0	New Edubiase United	
2013	Asante Kotoko	3–0	Medeama	
2014	Asante Kotoko	–	-	
2016	Medeama	1–0	Ashanti Gold	
2017	Wa All Stars	1–0	Bechem United	
2018	Aduana Stars	1–0	Asante Kotoko	
2021	Accra Hearts of Oak	–	-	
2022	Cancelled	-	-	
2023	Medeama	2–1	Dreams FC	
2024	Samartex	1–0	Nsoatreman	
2025	Asante Kotoko S.C.	1-0	Bibiani Gold Stars	
2026	Medeama	2-0	Nations FC	

=== Top performing clubs ===
Club	City / Region	Titles	Runners-up	Last title
Asante Kotoko SC	Kumasi, Ashanti	4	2	2025
Hearts of Oak SC	Accra, Greater Accra	3	0	2021
Medeama SC	Tarkwa, Western	3	1	2026
FC Nania	Legon, Greater Accra	1	0	2011
Wa All Stars	Wa, Upper West	1	0	2017
Aduana Stars	Dormaa Ahenkro, Brong-Ahafo	1	0	2018
Ghapoha	Tema, Greater Accra	0	1
Berekum Chelsea FC	Berekum, Brong-Ahafo	0	1
New Edubiase United FC	New Edubiase, Ashanti	0	1
Ashanti Gold SC	Obuasi, Ashanti	0	1
Bechem United	Bechem, Brong-Ahafo	0	1
Dreams FC	, Greater Accra	0	1
Nsoatreman	Nsoatre, Bono Region	0	1
Bibiani Gold Stars	Bibiani, Western North	0	1
Nations FC	Kumasi, Ashanti Region	0	1
