= Techiman Eleven Wonders FC =

Association football club in Techiman

- Nickname: Sure Wonders
- Ground: Ohene Ameyaw Park, Techiman; Obuasi Len Clay Sports Stadium, Obuasi, Ghana
- Owner: James Sarpong
- Chairman: Edward Sarpong
- Manager: Leslie Agyeman
- Coach: Thomas Agyekum
- League: Ghana Division One
- 2025–26: 18th, Ghana Premier League (relegated)
Home colors colours	Away colours colours

Techiman Eleven Wonders FC are a Ghanaian football club from Techiman currently playing in the Ghana Premier League. They play televised home games in the Obuasi Len Clay Sports Stadium in Obuasi.

== History ==
They were promoted to the top flight of Ghanaian soccer for the first time in 2017 after finishing in first place in Zone 1 of the Division One League. They immediately set about fundraising in an attempt to avoid relegation.

Their first official Premier League signing was veteran defender Idrissu Yahaya. In their first top-flight match, they held 20-time champion Hearts of Oak to a surprising 1–1 draw, with Alex Asamoah scoring their maiden goal. During the 2020–21 Ghana Premier League season, one of their stand out performers Salifu Ibrahim was signed by Accra Hearts of Oak.

== Grounds ==
The club plays their home matches at Ohene Ameyaw Park in Techiman in the Bono East Region, but they relocated to the Obuasi Len Clay Sports Stadium for the 2020–21 Ghana Premier League season.

== Current squad ==
Note: Flags indicate national team as defined under FIFA eligibility rules; some limited exceptions apply. Players may hold more than one non-FIFA nationality.

No.	Pos.	Nation	Player
2	DF	GHA	Joseph Adu Dwomoh
3	DF	GHA	Mohammed Rashid
4	DF	GHA	Kwayie Simms
5	MF	GHA	Ollenu Ashitey
6	MF	GHA	Tetteh Nortey
8	DF	GHA	Prince Baffoe
10	MF	GHA	Andrews Kuma
11	DF	GHA	Emmanuel kofi Owusu
13	MF	GHA	George Osei Amponsah
14	FW	GHA	Perry Addison Rockson
15	MF	GHA	Michael Osei
16	MF	GHA	Adu Boahen
17	MF	GHA	Felix Akorlor
18	DF	GHA	McCarthy Ofori
19	MF	GHA	Abu Musa Sule

No.	Pos.	Nation	Player
20	FW	GHA	Prince Okraku
21	MF	GHA	Salifu Ibrahim
23	FW	GHA	Clement Boahen
24	MF	GHA	Saddat Abass Mornah
25	MF	GHA	Jafar Abdul Razaq
26	MF	GHA	Isaac Fynn
27	FW	GHA	Samuel Boakye
28	MF	GHA	Frank Amankwaah
29	DF	GHA	Jonah Aryeetey
30	MF	GHA	Andivi Edmund
33	GK	GHA	George Ameyaw
44	GK	GHA	John Moosie
77	FW	GHA	Nana Kobina Osoh
99	GK	GHA	Abdulai Ibrahim

As of December 2020

== Coaches ==
Ignatius Osei-Fosu ( 2019–2021)
