= Karela United FC =

Ghanaian association football club

- Full name: Karela United FC
- Founded: 2013; 13 years ago
- Ground: Crosby Awuah Memorial Park; Aiyinase, Western Region, Ghana
- Capacity: 4,000
- Manager: Evans Adotey
- League: Ghana Premier League
- 2025–26: Ghana Premier League, 9th

Karela United FC is a Ghanaian professional football club based in Aiyinase, Ellembele District, Western Region. The club competed in the 2019 Ghanaian Normalisation Cup Competition.

Karela United FC's current owner is Ghanaian politician and businessman Haruna Iddrisu, who confirmed taking over the Ghana Premier League club in late 2022, investing significantly in facilities and player development, aiming to elevate the team's profile.

== History ==
The club was founded on Tuesday October 1, 2013, when the former Metropolitan Sporting Club changed its name to Karela United Football Club. Karela initially competed in the Ghana Division One league, off which they emerged as champions and were subsequently promoted into the Ghana Premier League in the year 2017. The first official match was played on Saturday November 23, 2013 against Proud United in a goalless draw at Kasoa.

=== 2018 – present ===
After the Ghana Premier League was hit by the Anas Number 12 scandal and the 2018 league season was cancelled along with the dissolution of the Ghana Football Association in June 2018, a Normalisation Competition was organised by the GFA normalisation committee to be played in place of the main league as the restructuring of the GFA was being put in place. Karela placed 2nd in group B to qualify for the next stage, beating Ashanti Gold SC at that stage to qualify to the finals to play against Asante Kotoko. Karela lost the finals in a penalty shootout round after the match ended in a 1–1 draw. They lost the bid to represent Ghana at the 2019–20 CAF Champions League and were declared runner-up in the Tier 1 of the competition.

After several distractions to the Ghana premier league from 2017 due to the dissolution of the GFA in June 2018, the 2018 league season was abandoned and the uprising of the deadly COVID-19 pandemic which also caused the 2019–20 league to be cancelled abruptly, the 2020–2021 season started in November 2020.

== Rivalry ==
Karela being a club based in the Nzema enclave of the Ellembele District located in Western Region of Ghana, they developed a fierce rivalry between them and their fellow Nzema enclave team Medeama SC. The rivalry has developed over the years into the Nzema Derby. They are also rivals with Nzema Kotoko.

== Grounds ==
The team's home games are played at Crosby Awuah Memorial Park.

=== Basake Holy Stars ===
The Basake Holy Stars also use the Crosby Awuah Memorial Park for home games. In September and October 2024, the Basake Holy Stars drew these Ghana Premier League attendances at the 4,000-capacity Crosby Awuah Memorial Park:

No.	Match	Attendance
1	Basake Holy Stars vs Asante Kotoko	3,720
2	Basake Holy Stars vs Medeama SC	2,840
3	Basake Holy Stars vs Karela United	2,760
4	Basake Holy Stars vs Dreams	2,560

== Current squad ==
As of 26 April 2023

Note: Flags indicate national team as defined under FIFA eligibility rules; some limited exceptions apply. Players may hold more than one non-FIFA nationality.

No.	Pos.	Nation	Player
2	DF	GHA	Augustine Randolph
3	DF	GHA	Emmanuel Anaful
4	DF	GHA	Ebenezer Ocran
5	MF	GHA	Daniel Paha Kwofie
7	FW	GHA	George Amonoo
8	DF	GHA	Fatawu Mohammed
9	FW	GHA	Richard Berko
10	MF	GHA	Brite Andoh
11	FW	GHA	Kelvin Andoh
14	MF	GHA	Kingsford Frimpong
15	MF	GHA	Dafie Humin Mohammed
16	FW	GHA	Patrick Mensah
17	FW	GHA	Philip Flamini

No.	Pos.	Nation	Player
18	DF	GHA	Kwodwo Addae (captain)
19	FW	GHA	Evans Adomako
20	MF	GHA	Joseph Dinku
21	DF	GHA	Abdul-Raman Yaya
27	MF	GHA	Isaac Donkor
29	FW	GHA	Stephen Akane
30	FW	GHA	Samuel Attah Kumi
31	MF	GHA	Emmanuel Boakye Owusu
33	FW	GHA	Franklin Osei
35	DF	GHA	Kweku Osei
36	DF	GHA	Mohammed Rashid
42	DF	GHA	Solomon Twene
88	GK	GHA	Emmanuel Essandoh

== Honours ==
=== Domestic ===
- Ghana Division One League Zone II
  - Champions (1): 2016–17

== Club captains ==
Philip Quarshie (2016–2018)

Godfred Saka (2018)

Empem Dacosta (2019)

Godfred Agyemang Yeboah (2019 – present)

== Managers ==
(Ghana) Johnson Smith, 2017 – October 2019

(Ghana) Evans Adotey, April 2020 – present
