= 2019 Ghana Football Association Normalization Committee Special Competition =

Normalization in Ghana Football Association

Ghana Football Association Normalization Committee Special Competition
- Season: 2019
- Champions League: Asante Kotoko
- Confederation Cup: Ashanti Gold
- Top goalscorer: Diawisie Taylor; Abdul Fatawu (10 goals each)
- Highest attendance: 39,000 (Accra Hearts of Oak vs. Asante Kotoko)

The 2019 Ghana Football Association Normalization Committee Special Competition was a special competition organized by the Ghana Football Association (GFA) Normalization Committee in 2019 in place of the Ghana Premier League, the top association football league in Ghana.

Due to the dissolution of the GFA in June 2018, the 2018 league season was abandoned, and a special competition was organized by the GFA Normalization Committee in 2019 to revive domestic football until the re-organization of the GFA. The competition started on 30 March 2019.

== Tier 1 ==
=== Group stage ===
The teams are divided into two groups: Group A for teams in the North and Group B for teams in the South.

==== Group A ====
Pos	Team	Pld	W	D	L	GF	GA	GD	Pts	Qualification or relegation
1	Ashanti Gold (Q)	12	7	2	3	17	6	+11	23	Qualification for Championship playoff
2	Asante Kotoko (Q)	12	6	4	2	14	5	+9	22	Qualification for Championship playoff
3	Medeama	12	7	1	4	13	10	+3	22	
4	Aduana Stars	12	4	5	3	10	10	0	17	
5	Bechem United	12	3	5	4	10	16	−6	14	
6	Techiman Eleven Wonders	12	3	3	6	9	14	−5	12	
7	Berekum Chelsea	12	1	2	9	5	17	−12	5	
8	Wa All Stars	0	0	0	0	0	0	0	0	Withdrew

Source: Ghana FA
(Q) Qualified for the phase indicated

==== Group B ====
Pos	Team	Pld	W	D	L	GF	GA	GD	Pts	Qualification or relegation
1	Hearts of Oak (Q)	14	9	1	4	20	9	+11	28	Qualification for Championship playoff
2	Karela United (Q)	14	8	3	3	20	13	+7	27	Qualification for Championship playoff
3	Liberty Professionals	14	7	4	3	20	11	+9	25	
4	Elmina Sharks	14	5	6	3	12	8	+4	21	
5	West African Football Academy	14	5	3	6	17	21	−4	18	
6	Dreams	14	4	4	6	10	17	−7	16	
7	Ebusua Dwarfs	14	3	2	9	9	19	−10	11	
8	International Allies	14	2	3	9	12	22	−10	9	

Source: Ghana FA
(Q) Qualified for the phase indicated

=== Championship playoff ===
==== Semifinals ====
16 June 2019

Hearts of Oak	1–1	Asante Kotoko
Penalties
	4–5

16 June 2019

Ashanti Gold	0–1	Karela United

==== Final ====
23 June 2019

Asante Kotoko	1–1	Karela United
Penalties
	4–1

Baba Yara Stadium

Asante Kotoko qualified for 2019–20 CAF Champions League.

== Tier 2 ==
=== Final ===
30 June 2019

Ashanti Gold	1–0	Nzema Kotoko

Cape Coast Sports Stadium

Ashanti Gold qualified for 2019–20 CAF Confederation Cup.

== Top scorers ==
Rank	Player	Club	Goals
1	(Ghana) Diawisie Taylor	Karela United	10
1	(Ghana) Abdul Fatawu	Asante Kotoko	10
3	(Ghana) Mumuni Shafiu	Ashanti Gold	5
3	(Ghana) Simon Zibo	Liberty Professionals	5
3	(Ghana) Christopher	Heart of Oak	5
3	(Ghana) Solomon Sarfo	Karela United	5
7	(Ghana) Fatawu	Aduana Stars	4
7	(Ghana) Elvis Kyei Baffour	Liberty Professionals	4
7	(Ghana) Emmanuel Osei	Karela United	4
7	(Ghana) Benjamin Eshun	Liberty Professionals	4
