= President's Cup (Ghana) =

Ghana football cup game

GHALCA President's Cup
- Organiser(s): Ghana League Clubs Association (GHALCA)
- Founded: 1969; 57 years ago
- Region: Ghana
- Teams: 2
- Current champions: Asante Kotoko SC
- Most championships: Asante Kotoko (9 titles)
- Broadcaster: GTV

The President's Cup is an annual one-off game, featuring two selected clubs at the end of the season. The cup is called the GHALCA President's Cup because it is organized by Ghana League Clubs Association (GHALCA) and played in honour of the sitting President of Ghana. The game was also known as the Republic Day Celebrations Cup and is usually played in July of each year to mark Ghana's Republic Day celebrations which falls on the 1 July.

The current holders are Asante Kotoko S.C., who defeated rivals Accra Hearts of Oak S.C. 1–2 in the 2025 match. Asante Kotoko holds the record for most wins with nine titles.

== History ==
Between 1969 and 1984, the cup was being played to honour the sitting president but was branded based on the sitting president at the time. The 1969 edition was known as the Busia Cup in honour of the then Prime Minister Abrefa Busia whilst the 1973 edition was known as the Acheampong Cup in honour of then head of state Ignatius Kutu Acheampong.

In 2003, after long layoff to the competition from 1985 to 2002, the competition was rebranded as the President's Cup and was instituted through the Ghana League Clubs Association and the National Sports Authority to serve a competition to honour the sitting president on every Republic Day Celebration. The first edition was played between Hearts of Oak and rivals Great Olympics, which Hearts won by 2–0.

In the 2024 edition, the organizers of the cup invited ASEC Mimosas to play against Asante Kotoko S.C.. The Ghanaian giants Asante Kotoko S.C. lost by 2—1 to the Cote D'Ivoire giant ASEC Mimosas.

The 2025 edition saw the giants in Ghana Football Accra Hearts of Oak S.C. and Asante Kotoko S.C. played against each other and victory went to the Kumasi based club, Asante Kotoko S.C.. They defeated their rivals by 2:1 to lift their ninth title.

== List of finals ==
Year	Winners	Score	Runners up
1969	Ebusua Dwarfs	1–0	Asante Kotoko
1973	Asante Kotoko	1–0	Hearts of Oak
1984	Asante Kotoko	1–1 (agg.) (a)	Hearts of Oak
2003	Hearts of Oak	2–0	Great Olympics
2004	Asante Kotoko	1–0	Liberty Professionals
2005	Asante Kotoko	1–0	Hearts of Oak
2008	Asante Kotoko	2–2 (4–3 p)	Heart of Lions
2009	Hearts of Oak	1–1 (5–4 p)	Eleven Wise
2011	Berekum Chelsea	2–2 (8–7 p)	Asante Kotoko
2012	Berekum Chelsea	2–1	Asante Kotoko
2013	Hearts of Oak	2–0	Medeama
2015	Hearts of Oak	0–0 (5–4 p)	Asante Kotoko
2016	Asante Kotoko	0–0 (3–2 p)	Hearts of Oak
2017	Asante Kotoko	0–0 (4–1p)	Hearts of Oak
2019	Asante Kotoko	2–1	Hearts of Oak
2020–2021	Not held due to COVID-19 pandemic		
2022	Hearts of Oak	2–1	Asante Kotoko
2023	Hearts of Oak	1–0	Asante Kotoko
2024	Asante Kotoko S.C.	1— 2	ASEC Mimosas
2025	Asante Kotoko S.C.	2—1	Accra Hearts of Oak S.C.
2026	Accra Hearts of Oak S.C.	TBP	Asante Kotoko S.C.

=== Performance by club ===
Club	Winners	Winning years
Asante Kotoko	9	1973, 1984, 2004, 2005, 2008, 2016, 2017, 2019,2025
Hearts of Oak	6	2003, 2009, 2013, 2015, 2022, 2023
Berekum Chelsea	2	2011, 2012

== See also ==
- Football in Ghana
- Ghana Premier League
- Ghana FA Cup
