= 2018 Ghana Premier League =

First Capital Plus Premier League
- Season: 2018
- Dates: 17 March 2018 – 7 June 2018
- Champions: League was cancelled
- Matches played: 116
- Top goalscorer: Hafiz Konkoni (8 goals)
- All statistics correct as of 30 December 2018. The League was cancelled in June 2018 due to GFA scandal

The 2018 Ghanaian Premier League was the 62nd season of top professional association football in Ghana. The season was initially scheduled to begin on 11 February 2018, but was postponed to 4 March 2018, and later postponed indefinitely. It was then scheduled to begin on 17 March 2018. The league kicked off on 17 March with a match between Inter-Allies vs Bechem United in Tema.

The Premier League was later cancelled in June 2018 by government directive following the Number 12 Expose corruption scandal within Ghana Football Association.

== Teams ==
Team	Location	Venue	Capacity
Ebusua Dwarfs	Cape Coast	Cape Coast Sports Stadium	15,000
Eleven Wonders	Techiman	Ohene Ameyaw Stadium	5,000
Karela United	Tarkwa	TNA Park	12,000
Asante Kotoko	Kumasi	Baba Yara Stadium	40,528
Liberty Professionals	Dansoman	Carl Reindorf Park	2,000
Bechem United	Bechem	Nana Gyeabour's Park	5,000
Hearts of Oak	Accra	Accra Sports Stadium	40,000
Aduana Stars	Dormaa Ahenkro	Agyeman Badu Stadium	7,000
Dreams	Accra	Dawu Sports Stadium	5,000
Inter Allies	Accra	Accra Sports Stadium	7,000
Ashanti Gold	Obuasi	Len Clay Stadium	30,000
Berekum Chelsea	Berekum	Golden City Sports Stadium	10,000
WAFA	Sogakope	Sogakope Red Bull Arena	1,000
Elmina Sharks	Elmina	Nduom Sports Stadium	15,000
Legon Cities	Accra	Accra Sports Stadium	40,000
Medeama	Tarkwa	TNA Park	5,000

== Standings ==
Last updated 6 June 2018 (championship suspended following government directive).

Pos	Team	Pld	W	D	L	GF	GA	GD	Pts
1	Medeama SC	14	8	3	3	19	12	+7	27
2	Ashanti Gold S.C.	15	8	3	4	15	9	+6	27
3	Karela United FC	15	7	4	4	17	10	+7	25
4	Asante Kotoko FC	15	7	3	5	15	13	+2	24
5	International Allies F.C.	15	8	0	7	15	15	0	24
6	Dreams FC	15	7	3	5	13	15	−2	24
7	West African Football Academy	15	5	5	5	22	17	+5	20
8	Elmina Sharks F.C.	14	4	8	2	14	12	+2	20
9	Berekum Chelsea FC	15	5	4	6	14	14	0	19
10	Bechem United FC	15	5	4	6	17	20	−3	19
11	Liberty Professionals FC	15	4	5	6	15	18	−3	17
12	Accra Hearts of Oak SC	14	4	5	5	13	16	−3	17
13	Techiman Eleven Wonders FC	15	5	2	8	13	16	−3	17
14	Aduana Stars	12	4	2	6	18	16	+2	14
15	Ebusua Dwarfs	14	3	5	6	13	20	−7	14
16	Wa All Stars FC	14	2	4	8	8	18	−10	10

== Season statistics ==
=== Scoring ===
==== Top scorers ====
Rank	Player	Club	Goals
1	(Ghana) Hafiz Konkoni	Bechem United	8
2	(Niger) Victorien Adebayor	Inter Allies	7
2	(Ghana) Kwasi Donsu	Medeama	7
4	Charles Boateng	WAFA	6
4	William Opoku Mensah	Karela United	6
4	Kwame Boateng	Medeama	6
7	Mohammed Yahaya	Aduana Stars	5
7	Stephen Amankona	Berekum Chelsea	5
7	Mumuni Shafiu	Dreams	5
10	Patrick Razak	Hearts of Oak	4

== See also ==
- 2018 Ghanaian FA Cup
