= Division Two League, Ghana =

The Division Two League is the second tier football league in Ghana. It is two tiers below the Ghana Premier League. The top teams after series of games are promoted to the upper tier and lower teams are relegated

== League structure ==
The league is divided into regional zones with a zone in each of the ten regions of the country. Each zone is further divided into two groups to further reduce the distance between the participating teams in a zone. Winners from each zone within the regions play a middle league. Some play sub-middle league in order to qualify for the National Division One League.

=== 2011–12 teams ===
Brong Ahafo Football Association.

Zone A

- Berekum Berlin FC
- Mim Freedom Fighters
- Techiman Kenten AC Milan

Zone B

- Japeikrom Asuo PRU
- Nsoatreman FC (Nsoatre)
- Techiman GSP United

Central Regional Football Association.

- Abreshia United
- Adansi Praso WAECO FC
- Agona Swedru Amanpong FC
- Cape Coast Nadel Ahli Rovers
- Ekotsi Hi-Kings FC (also listed as Gomoa Assin Hi-Kings)
- F.C. Takoradi

Eastern Regional Football Association.

- Akosombo Sparks FC
- Amasaman Bright Future FC
- Dawu Sporting Club
- Kwahu Abetifi Odwen Anomah FC
- Real Sportive (Tema)

Greater Accra Regional Football Association.

- Easy Classics
- Great Stars
- Power F.C. (Koforidua)
- Royal Knights (Nsawam)
- Shelter Force
