= Elmina Sharks F.C. =

Association football club in Elmina

Elmina Sharks
- Full name: Elmina Sharks F.C.
- Ground: Nduom Sports Stadium; Elmina, Central Region, Ghana
- League: Ghana Premier League
- Website: http://elminasharksfc.com/

Elmina Sharks F.C. is a football club from Ghana based in Elmina, Central Region. The club is competing in the 2018 Ghanaian Premier League. Home games are played at Nduom Sports Stadium.

== History ==
Elmina Sharks F.C. was born out of Coconut Grove Beach Resort in 1999. Elmina Sharks was formerly known as Coconut Grove Sharks FC and the team started as division one league team. The team was in the division two league for seven years and later on moved to division one in 2011. In the 2016 season, the team won promotion to the Ghana Premier League.

Elmina Sharks played two and a half seasons in the Ghana Premier League, finishing mid-table in 2017 and failing to make the playoff stage in 2019, with the 2018 season suspended due to corruption. In both the 2019–20 season and 2020–21 season, Benjamin Bernard Boateng finished as the club's top goal scorer.

== 2025 Sanctions and Fines ==
In March 2025, 5 of the club's officials were fined GHS 10,000 each and banned for the rest of the season. They had been found guilty of misconduct during a league match with Swedru All Blacks United FC in February 2025.

== Managerial history ==
- Kobina Amissah (2016–2017)
- Joachim Yaw Acheampong (2017–2021)
- Nii Lamptey (2021)
- Mallam Yahaya (2021–present)
