= Division One League =

Ghanaian football league

Division One
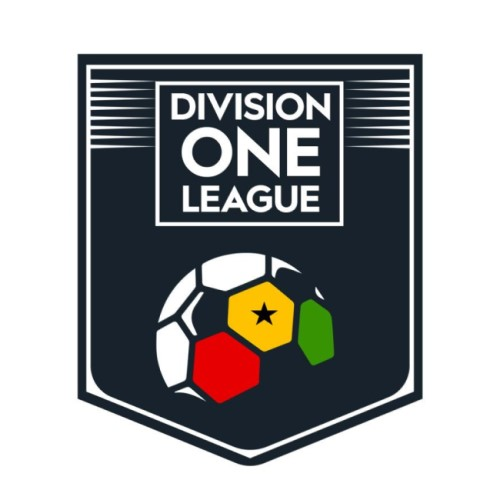
- Country: Ghana
- Confederation: CAF
- Number of clubs: 48 in 3 zones
- Level on pyramid: 2
- Promotion to: Ghana Premier League
- Relegation to: Ghana Division Two League
- Website: https://www.ghanafa.org/category/division-one

The Division One League is the second tier football league in Ghana, organized by the Ghana Football Association. The winner of each of the three zones will be promoted to the Ghana Premier League.

== League structure ==
The league is divided into three zones with a zone in the southern, middle and northern sectors of the country.

Regions Zone One: Brong-Ahafo, Northern, Upper West & Upper East Region

Regions Zone Two: Central, Western & Ashanti Region

Regions Zone Three: Eastern, Volta & Greater Accra Region

== 2026-27 season teams ==
Zone One	Zone Two	Zone Three
Steadfast	Nsuopon Fidelity	7th Wave FC
Wa Power	Future Stars	Accra Lions
Sankara Nationals	Ebiemo Nzema	Golden Warriors
Real Tamale United	Nations FC	True Democracy
Tamale City	Ebony FC	FC Nania
Northern City FC	New Edubiase United	Nukunu FC
Kalibi	Pro-Sports Academy	Golden Kick
Berekum City	PAC Academy	WAFA
Victory Club Warriors	Fettehman United	Home Stars FC
Bectero Sasana FC	Elmina Sharks	Okwawu United
Yapei United	King Faisal	Hakla SC
KAC Soccer Academy	Sekondi Rospak SC	Semper Fi
Techiman Eleven Wonders	Soccer Intellectuals	Inter Allies
Wamanafo Mighty Royals	Sefwi All Stars	Kotoku Royals
Dormaa Unity	Skyy FC	Great Olympics
Techiman Liberty Youth	Mysterious Dwarfs	Attram de Vissier

== List of champions ==
Season	Zone One	Zone Two	Zone Three
2021–22	Nsoatreman	Samartex	Oda Kotoku Royals
2022–23	Bofoakwa Tano	Nations FC	Heart of Lions
2023–24	Wenchi Young Apostles	Basake Holy Stars	Vision FC
2024–25	Techiman Eleven Wonders	Swedru All Blacks United	Hohoe United
2025–26	Debibi United	Ashanti Gold	Port City

== Sponsorship ==
Period	Title sponsor	Name	Ref.
2020–2022	None	Division One League	
2022–2026	Access Bank Ghana Plc	Access Bank Division One League	
2026-2029	Universal Merchant Bank	UMB Division One League	

== See also ==
- Ghana Premier League
- Ghana Football Leagues
- List of football clubs in Ghana
