= Accra Hearts of Oak S.C. =

Association football club in Accra

Hearts of Oak
- Full name: Accra Hearts of Oak Sporting Club
- Nickname: Phobia "Arose"
- Founded: 11 November 1911; 115 years ago
- Ground: Accra Sports Stadium
- Capacity: 40,000
- Chairman: Togbe Afede XIV
- Manager: Didi Dramani
- League: Ghana Premier League
- 2025–26: 3rd
- Website: https://www.heartsofoaksc.com/
Home colours	Away colours

Accra Hearts of Oak Sporting Club, commonly referred to as Hearts of Oak or just Hearts, is a professional sports club based in Accra (Greater Accra), Ghana. Founded in 1911, the club is the oldest surviving football club in Ghana, and its traditional colours are red, yellow and blue. Hearts of Oak competes in the Ghana Premier League; the premier division on the Ghanaian football pyramid. The Accra Sports Stadium is the club's home grounds.

Hearts has won the Premier League twenty-one times, Ghanaian FA Cup a record twelve times, Ghana Super Cup a joint record of three times, the President's Cup six times, the CAF Champions League and the CAF Confederation Cup.

Accra Hearts of Oak was also ranked the 8th football club in the world in 2000, a year in which the club won a treble, including the CAF Champions League.Accra Hearts of Oak remains the only football club in West Africa to have won a Continental Treble; one of 6 Africa-based clubs, and one of 21 football clubs worldwide to have achieved this feat.

During the colonial period, Hearts of Oak won a combined total of eight football league trophies in the Accra Football League and the Gold Coast Club Competition, both precursors to the Ghana Premier League. In the Accra Football League, Hearts of Oak won the Guggisberg Shield donated by Sir Gordon Guggisberg, then Governor of the Gold Coast in 1922; the competition for Accra-based clubs was played on 12 occasions between 1922 and 1954; Hearts of Oak won the Shield six times, including the final tournament played in 1954.

As of 2020, Accra Hearts of Oak SC is one of the most valuable football clubs from Ghana, valued at $5.3 million.

== History ==
The club was founded on 11 November 1911, in Accra. Hearts of Oak won their first major match in 1922 when Sir Gordon Guggisberg, then Governor of the Gold Coast, founded the Accra Football League. Hearts won 6 out of 12 seasons in this league. The club also won the 1953/54 edition of the Gold Coast Club Competition – the colonial precursor to the Ghana Premier League. In 1956, Hearts joined the Ghanaian Football League and have flourished ever since.

In the year 2000, the Hearts of Oak won the Ghanaian FA cup, the Ghana Premier League and for the first time in their history the CAF Champions League. This was the most successful year in the club's history. The team was led by club captain, Joseph Ansah.

On 9 May 2001, 127 people died in Africa's worst footballing disaster. During a match between rivals, Hearts of Oak and Asante Kotoko. Trouble started when supporters of Asante Kotoko began ripping out seats in protest at a goal allowed by the referee. The match was officiated by referee J. Wilson Sey, from Cape Coast. Police reacted by firing tear gas into the crowd, it has been suggested that this was an over-reaction. Reports suggest that the gates to the ground were locked and the stadium was not up to FIFA standards. The rush to escape the tear gas was a contributory factor to the death toll. A commission of inquiry, indicted six police officers in its initial report, but they were not convicted as it was deemed that the deaths could have been caused by the stampede instead of the tear gas.

As of 2020, the transfer value of the Accra Hearts of Oak was £2.03 million, the highest of all sports clubs in Ghana.

== Grounds ==
Accra Hearts of Oak play home matches at the Accra Sports Stadium. The Accra Sports Stadium holds an estimated 40,000 seats. Although purchased in the 1980s, the Pobiman Training Ground was only put to use in the summer of 2018. Construction for an expansion of the 19-acre site in the Pobiman neighborhood, is currently in the planning stages. The club plans to build a state-of-the-art facility.

== Rivalries ==
Accra Hearts of Oak's longest established rivalry is with Asante Kotoko S.C. and their city rivals Accra Great Olympics FC.

== Current squad ==
=== First team squad ===
As of 28 March, 2026

Note: Flags indicate national team as defined under FIFA eligibility rules; some limited exceptions apply. Players may hold more than one non-FIFA nationality.

No.	Pos.	Nation	Player
1	GK	GHA	Solomon Agbasi (captain)
4	DF	GHA	Ali Mohammed
5	DF	GHA	Kelvin Osei Asibey
6	MF	GHA	Raphael Amponsah
7	FW	GHA	Mawuli Wayo
8	MF	GHA	Theophilus Collison
9	FW	GHA	Frank Abora Duku
10	FW	GHA	Prince Kwabena Owusu
11	MF	GHA	Martin Karikari
12	DF	GHA	Emmanuel Amankwah
13	DF	GHA	Ransford Mensah
14	MF	GHA	Mohammed Hussein
15	DF	GHA	David Oppong Afrane
16	GK	GHA	Benjamin Asare
17	FW	GHA	Hamza Issah

No.	Pos.	Nation	Player
18	MF	GHA	Abdul Karim
20	MF	GHA	Stephen Asare
23	MF	GHA	George Paaku
24	DF	GHA	Yahaya Adraman
25	MF	GHA	Kwesi Asmah
26	DF	GHA	Baba Adamu
29	FW	GHA	Abdul-Aziz Adam
32	MF	GHA	Enock Asubonteng
33	GK	GHA	Sharif Shuaib
34	DF	GHA	Albert Kwasi
36	MF	GHA	Rocky Dwamena
37	MF	GHA	Gordon Cudjoe
41	MF	GHA	Ramzy Yussif
50	DF	GHA	Isaac Frimpong

Reference as of 12 March 2021

=== Out on loan ===
Note: Flags indicate national team as defined under FIFA eligibility rules; some limited exceptions apply. Players may hold more than one non-FIFA nationality.

No.	Pos.	Nation	Player
—	DF	GHA	Konadu Yiadom (Kryvbas Kryvyi Rih)

== Honours ==
=== Official trophies (recognised by CAF and FIFA) ===
==== Domestic ====
- Ghana Premier League
  - Champions (21): 1956, 1958, 1961–62, 1971, 1973, 1976, 1978, 1979, 1984, 1985, 1989–90, 1996–97, 1997–98, 1999, 2000, 2001, 2002, 2004–05, 2006–07, 2008–09, 2020–21
- Ghanaian FA Cup
  - Winners (12): 1973, 1974, 1979, 1981, 1989, 1990 (After winning a protest that declared them winners), 1993–94, 1995–96, 1999, 2000, 2021, 2022 (record)
- Ghana Super Cup
  - Winners (7): 1978, 1979, 1994, 1996, 1997, 1999, 2021 (record holder)

==== International ====
- CAF Champions League
  - Winners (1): 2000
  - Runners-up (2): 1977, 1979
- CAF Confederation Cup
  - Winners (1): 2004
- CAF Super Cup:
  - Winners (1): 2001
  - Runners-up (1): 2005

=== Other GFA National Titles ===
- Ghana SWAG Cup: 7

1973, 1974 (shared), 1977 (shared), 1978, 1979, 1984, 1985

- Ghana Telecom Gala: 4
- GHALCA Special Cup: 3
- Ghana Top Four Cup: 3
- Ghana Top Eight Cup: 2
- President's Cup: 6

2003, 2009, 2013, 2015, 2022, 2023

- Independence Cup: 4
- PLB Special Knockout: 1
- June 4 Cup: 3
- 31 December Revolution Cup: 1

=== Gold Coast ===
- Inclusive of trophies won in the Accra Football League (Guggisberg Shield) and the Gold Coast Club Competition, both played during the colonial period
  - Champions (8): 1920, 1922, 1925, 1927, 1929, 1933, 1935, 1953–54
  - Contributor - Bright Yeboah Taylor (Ghanaian Sports Journalist)

== Notable players ==
For all former players with a Wikipedia article see Category:Accra Hearts of Oak S.C. players

== Club captains ==
- Mahatma Ottoo (2011–2013)
- Thomas Abbey (−2017)
- Inusah Musah (2018)
- Fatawu Mohammed (2018–present)

== Managers ==
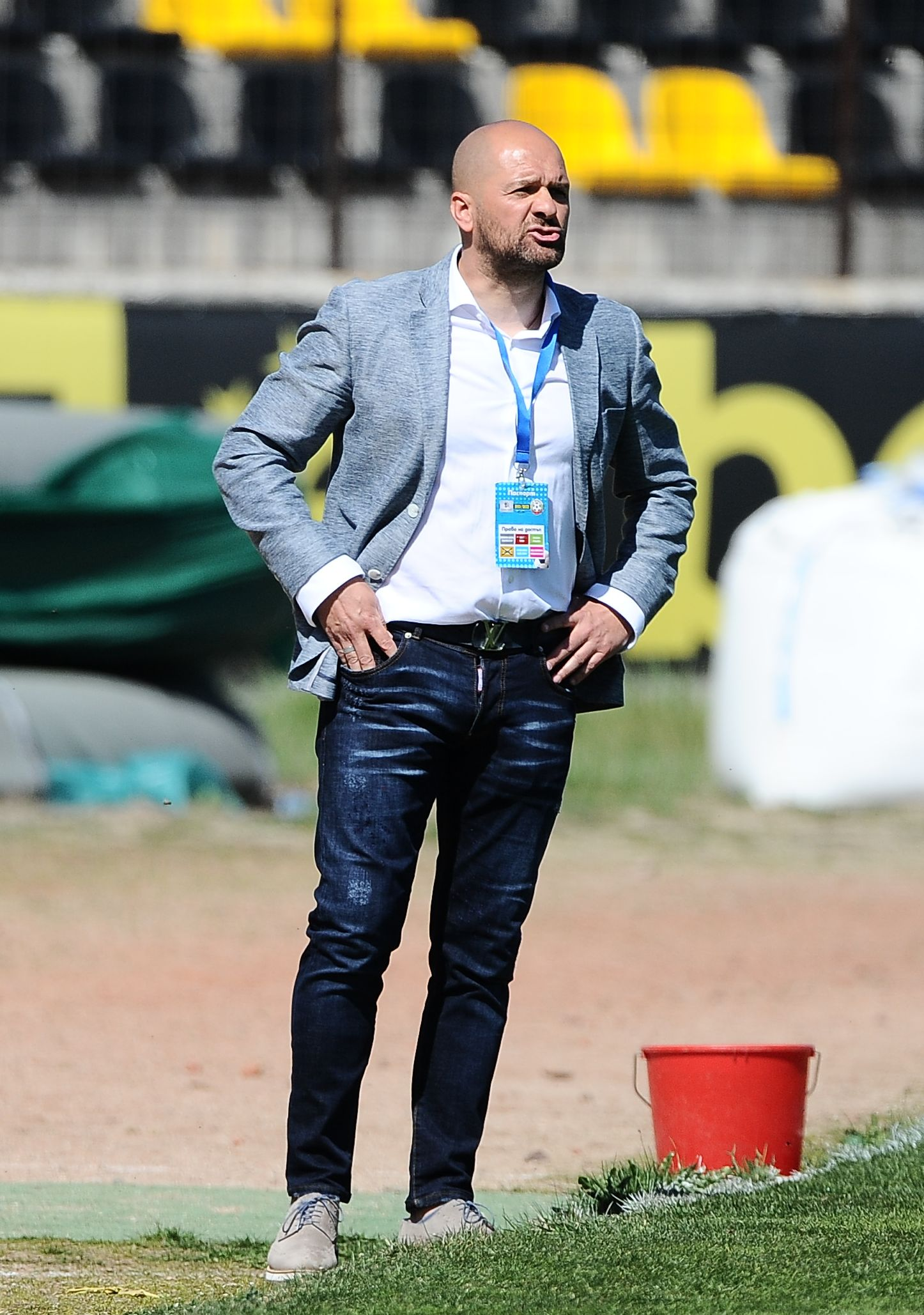
Slavko Matić became the manager of the Accra Hearts of Oak

List of managers since 1991

- (Romania) Petre Gavrilă (1991–95)
- (Ghana) Cecil Jones Attuquayefio (1998–01)
- (Ghana) Herbert Addo (2002–03)
- (Germany) Ernst Middendorp (2004)
- (Ghana) Cecil Jones Attuquayefio (2004)
- (Ghana) Archibald Lamptey (2004–05)
- (Ghana) Emmanuel Ofei Ansah (2005)
- (Israel) Eyal Lahman (2008)
- (Serbia) Kosta Papić (2008–09)
- (Serbia) Nebojša Vučićević (2011–12)
- (Ghana) Charles Akonnor (2012)
- (Ghana) David Duncan (2012–13)
- (Ghana) Mohammed Ahmed (Polo) (Interim) (2014)
- (Ghana) Herbert Addo (2014–2015)
- (Japan) Kenichi Yatsuhashi (2015–2016)
- (Portugal) Sérgio Traguil (2016 –2016)
- (Scotland) Frank Nuttall (2017–18)
- (Ghana) Henry Wellington Lamptey (2018)
- (Ghana) Seth Hoffmann (2018)
- (England) (Ghana) Kim Grant (2018–2019)
- (Ghana) Edward Nii Odoom (2020)
- (Serbia) Kosta Papić (2020–2021)
- (Ghana) Samuel Nii Noi (Interim) (2021)
- (Ghana) Samuel Boadu (2021–2022)
- (Serbia) Slavko Matic (2022–2023)
- (Netherlands) Martin Koopman (2023)
- (Ivory Coast) Aboubakar Ouattara (2023-2025)
- (Ghana) Mas-Ud Didi Dramani (2025-2026)
- (Bosnia and Herzegovina) Nebojsa Kapor

== Seasons ==
- 2020–21 Accra Hearts of Oak S.C. season
