= 2020–21 Asante Kotoko S.C. season =

Asante Kotoko S.C.
- Chairman: Dr. Kwame kyei
- Manager: Maxwell Konadu
- Stadium: Baba Yara Sports Stadium; Kumasi, Ashanti, Ghana
- Premier League: 2nd
- FA Cup: Semi-finals
- All statistics correct as of 11 August 2021.

The 2021–21 season of Ghanaian club Asante Kotoko S.C. The season covered the period from 20 November 2020 to 8 August 2021.

== Season overview ==
Asante Kotoko ended the 2020-21 season without a trophy after placing second in the domestic the league and was knock out by Berekum Chelsea F.C. in the FA Cup

== Technical team ==
The technical team

Position	Name
Head coach	(Ghana) Maxwell Konadu
Assistant head coach 1	(Ghana) Abdulai Gazzale
Goalkeeper coach	(Ghana) Najeeb Issah
Masseur	(Ghana) SK Ankomah
Team manager	(Ghana) Ohene Brenya

== Squad ==
=== Roaster beginning of season ===
As of 12 March 2021

Note: Flags indicate national team as defined under FIFA eligibility rules; some limited exceptions apply. Players may hold more than one non-FIFA nationality.

No.	Pos.	Nation	Player
1	GK	(Ghana) GHA	Razak Abalora
2	DF	(Ghana) GHA	Samuel Frimpong
3	DF	(Ghana) GHA	Salifu Mudasiru
4	DF	(Ghana) GHA	Yussif Mubarik
5	DF	(Ghana) GHA	Ibrahim Imoro
6	MF	(Ghana) GHA	Emmanuel Keyekeh
7	FW	(Ghana) GHA	Evans Adomako
8	MF	(Ghana) GHA	Muniru Sulley
9	FW	(Ghana) GHA	Kwame Opoku
10	MF	(Brazil) BRA	Fábio Gama
12	GK	(Ghana) GHA	Felix Annan
13	MF	(Ghana) GHA	Emmanuel Sarkodie
14	DF	(Ghana) GHA	Kwame Adom Frimpong
15	DF	(Ghana) GHA	Andrew Kwadwo Apau
16	GK	(Ghana) GHA	Ibrahim Danlad

No.	Pos.	Nation	Player
17	MF	(Ghana) GHA	Habib Mohammed
18	MF	(Ghana) GHA	Godfred Asiamah
19	FW	(Ghana) GHA	William Opoku Mensah
20	MF	(Ghana) GHA	Abdul Latif Anabila
21	DF	(Ghana) GHA	Patrick Kpojo Asmah
22	GK	(Ghana) GHA	Kwame Baah
23	DF	(Ghana) GHA	Christopher Nettey
24	DF	(Ghana) GHA	Wahab Adams
25	FW	(Ghana) GHA	Ibrahim Osman
26	FW	(Ghana) GHA	Augustine Okrah
27	FW	(Guinea) GUI	Naby Laye Keïta
28	MF	(Ghana) GHA	Emmanuel Gyamfi
—			
30	DF	(Ghana) GHA	Ismail Abdul-Ganiyu
—	MF		

== Pre-season and friendlies ==
Win Draw Loss Fixtures

The season was delayed as a result of COVID-19 pandemic in Ghana, causing the team to start preparations in September 2020. Kotoko however pitched camp in Koforidua.

Friendly	Asante Kotoko (Ghana)	3–0	(Ghana) Odweanoma FC	Elmina

Friendly	Asante Kotoko (Ghana)	3-0	(Ghana) Mighty Jets
		Report

Asante Kotoko (Ghana)	2-2	(Ghana) Krystal Palace

== Competitions ==
=== Premier League ===
==== League table ====
Pos	Team	Pld	W	D	L	GF	GA	GD	Pts	Promotion or relegation
1	Hearts of Oak (C, Q)	34	17	10	7	45	23	+22	61	2021–22 CAF Champions League
2	Asante Kotoko	34	15	12	7	37	22	+15	57	
3	WAFA	34	16	8	10	46	38	+8	56	
4	Aduana Stars	34	16	7	11	44	42	+2	55	
5	Medeama	34	15	9	10	38	34	+4	54	

Updated to match(es) played on 18 July 2021. Source: type=Goal.com
(C) Champions; (Q) Qualified for the phase indicated
