= 2021–22 Ghana Premier League =

66th season of the Ghana Premier League

Ghana Premier League
- Season: 2021–22
- Dates: 29 October 2021 – 19 June 2022
- Country: (Ghana) (18 teams)
- Champions: Asante Kotoko
- Relegated: Eleven Wonders; WAFA; Elmina Sharks
- Champions League: Asante Kotoko
- Matches: 306
- Goals: 624 (2.04 per match)
- Top goalscorer: Yaw Annor (22 goals)
- Biggest home win: Ashanti Gold 6–0 WAFA (9 April 2022)
- Biggest away win: Ashanti Gold 1–4 Eleven Wonders (27 February 2022)
- Highest scoring: Dreams 5–2 Great Olympics (20 March 2022)
- Longest winning run: 6 matches Aduana Stars
- Longest unbeaten run: 10 matches Bechem United
- Longest winless run: 10 matches Elmina Sharks, King Faisal
- Longest losing run: 7 matches Elmina Sharks, King Faisal
- Live Matches on StarTimes Ghana.

The 2021–22 Ghana Premier League was the 66th season of the top professional association football league in Ghana which began on 29 October 2021 and concluded on 19 June 2022. Hearts of Oak were the defending champions.

Asante Kotoko won the league for a record-extending 25th time and the first since 2014 after a 1–1 draw against Ashanti Gold and were handed the trophy on the season's final day after a 3-0 triumph over relegated Elmina Sharks. As champions, Kotoko will participate in the qualification procedures for the following season's CAF Champions League.

== Teams ==
Eighteen teams competed in the league; the 15 from the previous season and the 3 winners of the Division One League zones. The promoted teams were Bibiani Gold Stars and Accra Lions, who both achieved promotion for the first time. RTU returned to the league for the first time since their relegation in 2013. They replaced Ebusua Dwarfs, Liberty Professionals and Inter Allies.

=== Stadiums and locations ===
Team	Location	Venue	Capacity
Accra Lions	Accra	Accra Sports Stadium	40,000
Aduana Stars	Dormaa Ahenkro	Agyeman Badu Stadium	7,000
Asante Kotoko	Kumasi	Baba Yara Stadium	40,000
Ashanti Gold	Obuasi	Len Clay Stadium	20,000
Bechem United	Bechem	Nana Gyeabour's Park	5,000
Berekum Chelsea	Berekum	Golden City Sports Stadium	5,000
Bibiani Gold Stars	Bibiani	Dun's Park	7,000
Dreams	Dawu	Dawu Sports Stadium	5,000
Eleven Wonders	Techiman	Ohene Ameyaw Stadium	2,000
Elmina Sharks	Elmina	Nduom Sports Stadium	5,000
Great Olympics	Accra	Accra Sports Stadium	40,000
Hearts of Oak	Accra	Accra Sports Stadium	40,000
Karela United	Aiyinase	CAM Stadium	5,000
King Faisal	Kumasi	Baba Yara Stadium	40,000
Legon Cities	Accra	El Wak Stadium	7,000
Medeama	Tarkwa	TNA Park	15,000
RTU	Tamale	Tamale Stadium	21,017
WAFA	Sogakope	WAFA Park	1,000

Location of the 2021–22 Ghana Premier League teams

=== Club managers and captains ===
The table lists club managers.

Team	Manager	Captain
Accra Lions	(England) James Francis	(Ghana) Richmond Tetteh Ankrah
Aduana Stars	(Ghana) Ben Zola	(Ghana) Joseph Addo
Asante Kotoko	(Ghana) Prosper Narteh Ogum	(Ghana) Ismail Abdul-Ganiyu
Ashanti Gold	(Ghana) Thomas Duah	(Ghana) Richard Osei Agyemang
Bechem United	(Ghana) Mingle Ocansey Kasim	(Ghana) Kofi Agbesimah
Berekum Chelsea	(Ghana) Solomon Odwo	(Ghana) Jackson Owusu
Bibiani Gold Stars	(Ghana) Micheal Osei	(Ghana) Yakubu Haqq
Dreams	(Ghana) Ignatius Osei-Fosu	(Ghana) Abdul Jalilu
Eleven Wonders	(Ghana) Prince George Koffie	(Ghana) Simms Kwayie
Elmina Sharks	(Ghana) Kobina Amissah	(Ghana) Ishmael Hammond
Great Olympics	(Ghana) Annor Walker	(Ghana) Jamal Deen Haruna
Hearts of Oak	(Ghana) Samuel Boadu	(Ghana) Abdul Fatawu Mohammed
Karela United	(Ghana) Bismark Kobby Mensah	(Ghana) Kwadwo Addae
King Faisal	(Serbia) Branko Božović	(Ghana) Richard Atrofi
Legon Cities	(Ghana) Maxwell Konadu	(Ghana) Francis Addo Nuer
Medeama	(Ghana) Ben Owu	(Ghana) Joseph Tetteh Zutah
RTU	(Ghana) Shaibu Ibrahim Tanko	(Ghana) Mohammed Hardi Abdulai
WAFA	(Spain) Guillermo Zaragoza	(Ghana) Konadu Yiadom

=== Managerial changes ===
Team	Outgoing manager	Manner of departure	Date of vacancy	Position in the table	Incoming manager	Date of appointment	References
Bibiani Gold Stars	Kobina Amissah	Resigned	10 August 2021	Pre-Season	Micheal Osei	27 August 2021	
Medeama SC	Yaw Preko	Sacked	20 August 2021	Pre-Season	Ignatius Osei-Fosu	20 August 2021	
Eleven Wonders	Ignatius Osei-Fosu	Signed by Medeama SC	20 August 2021	Pre-Season	Evans Adotey	13 September 2021	
Ashanti Gold	Ernest Thompson-Quartey	Sacked	15 November 2021	10th	Thomas Duah	15 November 2021	
Medeama SC	Ignatius Osei-Fosu	Sacked	17 November 2021	14th	Ben Owu	13 September 2021	
Elmina Sharks	Nii Lamptey	Resigned	30 November 2021	11th	Kobina Amissah	30 November 2021	
Accra Lions	Rainer Kraft	Resigned	7 December 2021	11th	James Francis	7 December 2021	
Berekum Chelsea	Moses Cofie	Sacked	31 December 2021	7th	Rui Gregório	1 February 2022	
Elmina Sharks	Mallam Yahaya	Sacked	13 January 2022	18th	Kobina Amissah	18 January 2022	
Ashanti Gold	Thomas Duah	End of interim spell	31 January 2022	9th	Henry Häusler	1 February 2022	
Aduana	Asare Bediako	Sacked	1 February 2022	5th	Ben Zola	4 February 2022	
Dreams FC	Vladislav Virić	Resigned	8 February 2022	11th	Abdul-Karim Zito	10 February 2022	
Eleven Wonders	Joachim Yaw	Resigned	8 February 2022	17th	Prince George Koffie	6 March 2022	
Ashanti Gold	Henry Häusler	Sacked	2 March 2022	12th	Thomas Duah	3 March 2022	
Aduana	Ben Zola	End of interim spell	16 March 2022	2nd	Felix Aboagye	17 March 2022	
Berekum Chelsea	Rui Gregório	Sacked	31 March 2022	7th	Solomon Odwo	1 April 2022	

== League table ==
Pos	Team	Pld	W	D	L	GF	GA	GD	Pts	Promotion or relegation
1	Asante Kotoko	34	19	10	5	48	20	+28	67	Qualification for the CAF Champions League first round
2	Medeama	34	16	8	10	28	25	+3	56	
3	Bechem United	34	13	15	6	37	24	+13	54	
4	Karela United	34	13	13	8	43	33	+10	52	
5	Great Olympics	34	12	12	10	36	31	+5	48	
6	Hearts of Oak	34	12	12	10	33	29	+4	48	Qualification for the CAF Confederation Cup first round (Note: Hearts Of Oak qualified for the CAF Confederation Cup as the 2021–22 Ghanaian FA Cup winners)
7	Ashanti Gold	34	13	8	13	46	37	+9	47	Caught match-fixing and admitted to the Division Two League (Note: Ashanti Gold were caught match-fixing and were relegated.)
8	Berekum Chelsea	34	12	11	11	29	30	−1	47	
9	Bibiani Gold Stars	34	14	4	16	34	40	−6	46	
10	Legon Cities	34	11	13	10	34	26	+8	46	
11	Aduana Stars	34	11	12	11	33	28	+5	45	
12	Accra Lions	34	12	9	13	26	38	−12	45	
13	Dreams	34	11	11	12	47	44	+3	44	
14	King Faisal	34	12	6	16	30	34	−4	42	
15	RTU	34	10	11	13	40	48	−8	41	
16	Eleven Wonders	34	10	10	14	29	38	−9	40	Relegation to Division One League
17	WAFA	34	8	11	15	27	42	−15	35	Relegation to Division One League
18	Elmina Sharks	34	5	8	21	24	57	−33	23	Relegation to Division One League

Source: Ghana Premier League and

== Results ==
Home \ Away	ACC	ADU	ASA	ASH	BEC	BER	BIB	DRE	ELE	ELM	GRE	HEA	KAR	KIN	LEG	MED	RTU	WAF
Accra Lions		0–0	1–1	0–1	2–1	2–0	1–0	1–0	1–0	1–1	0–0	0–3	1–0	0–0	1–0	1–0	2–1	0–0
Aduana Stars	1–1		0–2	0–0	0–1	3–2	0–1	0–0	3–0	0–0	1–0	1–0	2–0	1–3	1–1	1–1	5–1	3–0
Asante Kotoko	3–1	1–1		3–1	2–0	0–1	5–0	2–0	2–0	3–0	2–0	1–0	1–1	2–3	1–3	1–0	1–1	1–0
Ashanti Gold	2–2	0–1	1–1		2–1	5–1	2–2	2–1	1–4	4–0	0–0	2–0	1–1	2–0	0–0	0–1	4–0	6–0
Bechem United	1–0	1–0	0–0	2–0		1–1	1–0	3–1	1–0	2–0	1–0	1–1	1–1	1–0	0–0	4–0	2–0	0–0
Berekum Chelsea	3–1	1–0	0–0	1–0	1–1		1–0	0–1	0–0	3–0	0–0	0–0	1–0	1–0	1–0	0–0	0–1	2–0
Bibiani Gold Stars	2–0	1–0	0–1	2–2	1–0	1–0		1–0	1–0	1–0	2–1	0–1	2–1	2–1	2–1	1–0	2–0	3–4
Dreams	3–1	3–1	1–3	1–0	0–0	0–1	2–1		1–1	2–0	5–2	2–2	3–1	1–1	0–1	2–0	2–2	1–1
Eleven Wonders	2–0	2–1	0–0	0–1	3–2	1–1	2–1	1–1		3–1	0–0	2–1	2–1	2–0	0–0	0–0	1–0	0–0
Elmina Sharks	1–1	0–1	2–1	1–3	2–3	0–0	2–1	1–3	2–0		2–2	0–1	2–1	1–0	0–2	1–3	1–1	2–2
Great Olympics	3–1	2–1	0–1	0–1	0–0	2–0	2–0	3–3	2–0	1–0		3–0	1–1	2–1	1–0	1–2	2–1	2–2
Hearts of Oak	2–0	1–1	0–0	2–1	0–0	2–0	1–0	3–1	4–1	1–1	0–1		1–1	1–0	0–0	1–0	1–4	2–1
Karela United	3–0	1–1	0–0	2–1	1–1	2–1	2–0	1–0	4–2	3–1	1–0	1–0		1–1	1–1	1–1	5–1	1–0
King Faisal	0–1	0–1	0–1	2–0	2–2	0–1	2–1	3–2	1–0	1–0	1–1	1–0	0–2		2–1	0–0	2–0	1–0
Legon Cities	0–1	0–1	1–2	2–0	0–0	0–0	1–1	2–1	3–0	2–0	0–1	1–1	0–0	1–0		3–1	3–2	2–1
Medeama	2–1	1–0	0–2	2–0	1–0	1–1	1–1	0–1	1–0	1–0	0–0	1–0	2–0	1–0	1–0		2–1	1–0
RTU	2–0	1–1	2–1	2–0	2–2	3–2	2–0	2–2	0–0	2–0	1–1	0–0	1–1	1–0	1–1	0–1		2–0
WAFA	0–1	0–0	0–1	0–1	1–1	3–2	1–0	1–1	1–0	2–0	1–0	1–1	0–1	1–2	2–2	1–0	1–0	

Updated to match(es) played on unknown. Source: Fixtures & Results
Legend: Blue = home team win; Yellow = draw; Red = away team win.

== Promotion play-offs ==
On July 17 the GFA annound that there will be a play-off between the three second-placed clubs in the Division One Leagues.

The three 2nd placed clubs, Tamale City FC, Mysterious Ebusua Dwarfs FC and Liberty Professionals will play in a three-way League to determine the replacement for AshantiGold SC.

4 August 2022	Ebusua Dwarfs	1–3	Liberty Professionals	Accra
15:00	Addai 6'		MacAdjei 10'; Oduro 38', 60' (pen.)	Stadium: Accra Sports Stadium; Referee: Frederick Samena

6 August 2022	Liberty Professionals	0–1	Tamale City	Accra
15:00				Stadium: Accra Sports Stadium

8 August 2022	Tamale City	1–1	Ebusua Dwarfs	Accra
15:00				Stadium: Accra Sports Stadium

== Season statistics ==
=== Top scorers ===
Rank	Player	Club	Goals
1	(Ghana) Yaw Annor	Ashanti Gold	22
2	(Cameroon) Franck Mbella Etouga	Asante Kotoko	21
3	(Ghana) Bright Adjei	Aduana Stars	14
3	(Ghana) Augustine Okrah	Bechem United	14
5	(Ghana) Umar Bashiru	Karela United	14
6	(Ghana) Agyenim Boateng Mensah	Dreams F.C.	10
6	(Ghana) Laar Ibrahim	Eleven Wonders	10
6	Maxwell Nii Abbey Quaye	Great Olympics	10

==== Hat-tricks ====
Player	For	Against	Result	Date
(Ghana) Maxwell Abbey Quaye	Great Olympics	Accra Lions	3–1 (H)	7 November 2021
(Ghana) Zubairu Ibrahim	King Faisal	Asante Kotoko	3–2 (H)	5 December 2021
(Ghana) Franck Mbella Etouga	Asante Kotoko	Ashanti Gold	3–1 (H)	9 January 2022
(Ghana) Franck Mbella Etouga	Asante Kotoko	Accra Lions	3–1 (H)	12 February 2022
(Ghana) Bright Adjei	Aduana Stars	Eleven Wonders	3–0 (H)	13 February 2022
(Ghana) Yaw Annor	Ashanti Gold	WAFA	6–0 (H)	9 April 2022
(Ghana) Yaw Annor^{4}	Ashanti Gold	Berekum Chelsea	5–1 (H)	1 May 2022

Notes

(H) – Home team
(A) – Away team

=== Assists ===
Rank	Player	Club	Assists
1	(Ghana) Ibrahim Imoro	Asante Kotoko	9
2	(Ghana) Ronald Frimpong	RTU	7
3	(Ghana) Mawuli Wayo	King Faisal	6
3	(Ghana) Justice Anane	Berekum Chelsea	6
5	(Ghana) Salifu Ibrahim	Hearts of Oak	5
5	(Ghana) Victor Oduro	Dreams	5
5	(Cameroon) Georges Mfegue	Asante Kotoko	5

=== Clean sheets ===
Rank	Player	Club	Clean sheets
1	(Ghana) Abdulai Iddrisu	Bechem United	18
2	(Ghana) Gregory Sekyere	Berekum Chelsea	15
3	(Ghana) Fredrick Asare	Accra Lions	14
4	(Ghana) Ibrahim Danlad	Asante Kotoko	12
5	(Ghana) Stephen Kwaku	Great Olympics	11
6	(Ivory Coast) Boris Mandjui	Medeama	10
7	(Ghana) Joseph Addo	Aduana Stars	9
7	(Ghana) Dennis Votere	Ashanti Gold	9

== Awards ==
=== Monthly awards ===
As of 4 May 2022

Month	Player of the Month		Manager of the Month		References
Month	Player	Club	Manager	Club	References
November	(Ghana) Abdul Fatawu Issahaku	Dreams	(Ghana) Prosper Narteh Ogum	Asante Kotoko	
December	(Ghana) Emmanuel Gyamfi	Aduana Stars	(Ghana) Asare Bediako	Aduana Stars	
January	(Cameroon) Franck Mbella Etouga	Asante Kotoko	(Ghana) Prosper Narteh Ogum	Asante Kotoko	
February	(Ghana) Bright Adjei	Aduana Stars	(Ghana) Annor Walker	Great Olympics	
March	(Ghana) Kelvin Andoh	Karela United	(Ghana) Kassim Mingle	Bechem United	
April	(Ghana) Yaw Annor	Ashanti Gold	(Ghana) Maxwell Konadu	Legon Cities	

== Attendances ==
Even though COVID-19 limitations were in place, Asante Kotoko drew an average home attendance of 4,585 during the 2021–22 Ghana Premier League season. One of the games with a high attendance was the game between the Accra Hearts of Oak and Asante Kotoko, which took place in Accra in front of a crowd of 20,000.

== See also ==
- 2021–22 Ghana Women's Premier League
- 2021–22 Ghanaian FA Cup
