= Ignatius Osei-Fosu =

Ghanaian association football manager

Ignatius Kwame Osei-Fosu (born 18 April 1986) is a Ghanaian football manager who is currently the assistant coach of the Sudan national team. He previously coached Ghanaian team Liberty Professionals and Techiman Eleven Wonders.

== Early life ==
Osei-Fosu is a trained teacher. He serves as a Principal teacher at the Kwame Nkrumah University of Science and Technology basic school, specifically Junior High School (JHS) section.

== Coaching career ==
=== Early career ===
Osei-Fosu holds a CAF License A badge. He worked a scout for Dramani Mas-Ud Didi during his stint as coach of Asante Kotoko.

=== Liberty Professionals ===
He served as assistant coach Liberty Professionals in 2016 to 2017. He was later promoted to interim-coach in 2017. With the appointed of Michael Osei as new coach, he was moved back to his role as assistant coach of the side. He parted ways with the club in September 2017.

=== Eleven Wonders ===
In December 2019, following the departure of Frimpong Manso as coach, he was appointed as head coach of Techiman Eleven Wonders ahead of the 2019–20 Ghana Premier League season. In his first season, he guided Eleven Wonders to the 12th position on the league standings before the season was truncated as a result of the COVID-19 pandemic. In November 2020, he was linked with moves to Legon Cities after the departure of Goran Barjaktarevic, the reports however did not come through as he continued in his role as head coach of Eleven Wonders. In November 2020, Osei-Fosu expressed his ambition of coaching the Ghana national football team, the Black Stars in the near future.

In the 2020–21 season, his second season in charge, Techiman Wonders climbed from relegation zone in late June to a secure 12th-place finish at the end of the season. His contract expired at the end of the season.

=== Medeama ===
On 20 August 2021, Osei-Fosu signed a three-year deal with Tarkwa based club Medeama, replacing Yaw Preko who joined the club on short term contract after Samuel Boadu joined Hearts of Oak.
