= Fábio Gama =

Brazilian footballer (born 1992)

Personal information
- Full name: Fábio Gama dos Santos
- Date of birth: 2 October 1992 (age 34)
- Place of birth: Ribeira do Pombal, Brazil
- Height: 1.69 m (5 ft 7 in)
- Positions: Attacking midfielder; winger

Team information
- Current team: Dourados AC
- Number: 23

Youth career
- –2012: Bahia

Senior career*
Years	Team	Apps	(Gls)
2012–2013	Bahia	0	(0)
2013	→ Botafogo-SP (loan)	14	(1)
2014	Serrano	0	(0)
2015	Botafogo da Paraíba	3	(0)
2016	Gama	27	(3)
2016–2017	ABC	14	(2)
2017	Campinense	7	(1)
2017	Itabaiana	5	(0)
2018	Gama	10	(0)
2018	URT	5	(0)
2018	IFK Värnamo	14	(2)
2019	Jönköpings Södra	19	(1)
2020–2022	Asante Kotoko	48	(5)
2022–2023	Al-Muharraq	27	(7)
2023	Busaiteen	18	(8)
2024	Jequié	10	(0)
2024–2025	PSMS Medan	21	(0)
2026–	Dourados AC	2	(0)
- * Club domestic league appearances and goals as of 15 February 2026

Fábio Gama dos Santos (born 2 October 1992) is a Brazilian professional footballer who plays as a midfielder for Campeonato Sul-Mato-Grossense club Dourados Atlético Clube.

Gama has featured for several clubs in Brazil including Bahia where he started his career, Gama, Itabaiana, Botafogo-SP, Botafago-PB, ABC, Campinense and URT. In 2018, he moved to Sweden where he joined IFK Värnamo and later Jönköpings Södra in 2019. In 2020, he joined Ghanaian club Asante Kotoko giving way for a resurgence of his career and was regarded as one of the exciting footballers and play makers in the league during his two year stay.

== Club career ==
Gama began his career at Bahia, before later signing for Botafogo SP. He made his competitive senior debut playing for Botafogo SP on 16 February 2013 coming on in the 57th minute for Gilmak in a 4–3 loss to Mirassol in the Campeonato Paulista. He played 14 matches and scored a goal before at the end of the season, before joining Serrano on a permanent deal in 2014. In 2015, he joined Botafogo da Paraíba before joining Gama in January 2016. At Gama, he played 27 league matches and scored three goals. By the start of June 2016, he had left Gama and signed for ABC. He played two seasons at Gama, after which he joined Campinense in March 2017. He spent two months with the Paraíba-based club before joining Itabaiana in May 2017.

In January 2018, Gama rejoined his former club Gama. His second spell at the club was less eventful as he played 10 league matches before he joined URT.

=== IFK Värnamo ===
In July 2018, he signed for Swedish club IFK Värnamo on a free transfer. He made his debut on 6 August 2018 in their 1–1 league draw against Landskrona. In his second start, he scored his first goal for IFK Värnamo in a 3–1 victory over his future club Jönköping.

He scored his second goal for the club on 12 September 2019 in a 2–1 victory over GAIS. In the next game week, he scored another goal against Degerfors, however this time the match ended in a 2–1 loss to IFK Värnamo. At the end of the season, he had played in 14 out of 15 possible league matches. He also played in both legs of their relegation play-offs with the club dropping from the Superettan to the Division 1 after losing to Varbergs BoIS. In January 2019, Gama joined Swedish club Jönköpings Södra.

=== Asante Kotoko ===
After playing for several clubs in Brazil, in November 2020, Gama was signed by Ghanaian club Asante Kotoko as they looked to bolster their club ahead of the 2020–2021 season and raise their chances in the continental cup. He made his debut after coming on in the 83rd minute for Godfred Asiamah in a 1–1 draw against Medeama on 27 December 2021. His debut was delayed for over a month due to delayed acquisition and processing of his work permit.

On 11 January 2021, he made his full debut for the club after playing the full 90 minutes and providing the assist to Kwame Opoku's second goal to give Kotoko a 2–0 victory over Liberty Professionals. 3 April 2021, Gama scored his first goal for Asante Kotoko, scoring a volley in the 7th minute in their Ghana Premier League 1–1 draw against Techiman Eleven Wonders. The following week, he was awarded the man of the match after he provided the assist to Ismail Abdul-Ganiyu for the first goal and scored the second goal via an assist from Augustine Okrah to help Kotoko win by 4–0 against Bechem United. On 6 June 2021, he scored his third goal of the season and was adjudged the man of the match in Kotoko's 1–0 victory over regional rivals Ashanti Gold. After scoring twice in June and winning two man of the match awards, he was nominated for the GPL NASCO player of the month for June. The award was however won by West African Football Academy player Augustine Boakye.

At the end of the season, he played 28 league matches, scored 4 goals, provided 6 assists and won 4 man of the match awards. He was also nominated for the Ghana Football Awards Home-based player of the year. He was regarded publicly that season as being the best player in the Ghana Premier League including by former Ghanaian international Charles Taylor. In October 2021, Gama emerged as the most attractive player in the Ghana Premier League based on the African Sports Centre for Data, Research and Technology's 2021 Ghana Premier League Report, taking over from former Black Stars striker Asamoah Gyan who joined Legon Cities the season before.

=== Bahrain ===
In July 2022, after the expiration of his contract with Asante Kotoko, Gama signed for Bahrain Al Muharraq SC as a free agent on a one-year deal. He played the first part of the season for Al Muharraq in the Bahraini Premier League and subsequently moved to Busaiteen Club in the Second Bahraini League. He put up impressive performances, played 18 matches, scoring 8 goals and assisted 10 to help Busaiteen to a second-place finish to gain promotion to the Bahraini Premier League.

== International career ==
Gama has featured for the Brazil U-17 and U-20 team. After playing for Asante Kotoko in Ghana, mentioned in an interview at radio station Pure FM, that he will consider nationality switch if Ghana shows interest in him but he can't say 'no' and nor say 'yes' at the time of the interview in April 2021.

== Honours ==
Asante Kotoko

- Ghana Premier League: 2021–22

Individual

- Ghana Premier League Most Attractive player: 2021
