= Yussif Mubarik =

Ghanaian footballer (born 1995)

Personal information
- Date of birth: 29 December 1995 (age 30)
- Place of birth: Kumasi, Ghana
- Height: 1.84 m (6 ft 0 in)
- Position: Defender

Team information
- Current team: Medeama
- Number: 4

Senior career*
Years	Team	Apps	(Gls)
2016–2017	Liberty Professionals	50	(1)
2017–2020	Ashanti Gold	25	(2)
2019–2023	Asante Kotoko	57	(1)
2023	Chitwan	8	(0)
2024	Manila Digger	0	(0)
2024–	Medeama	47	(5)
- * Club domestic league appearances and goals as of 31 August 2026

Mubarak Yussif (born 29 December 1995) is a Ghanaian professional footballer who plays as a centre-back for Ghana Premier League club Medeama, where he serves as captain.

Mubarik began his senior career with Liberty Professionals before joining Ashanti Gold in 2018. He subsequently spent three seasons with Asante Kotoko, winning the 2021–22 Ghana Premier League. After spells with FC Chitwan in Nepal and Manila Digger in the Philippines, he returned to Ghana to join Medeama in 2024. As captain, he helped the club win the 2025–26 Ghana Premier League and the 2026 Ghana Super Cup.

== Club career ==
=== Liberty Professionals ===
Mubarik began his senior career with Liberty Professionals and was registered in the club's squad for the 2016 Ghana Premier League season. He made his league debut on 6 March 2016, playing the full 90 minutes in a goalless draw against Wa All Stars. He made 20 league appearances during his debut season as Liberty avoided relegation.

Mubarik established himself as a regular starter during the 2017 season, forming a defensive partnership with Samuel Sarfo. On 28 June 2017, he scored his first league goal, opening the scoring in a 3–0 victory over Bolga All Stars. He appeared in all 30 league matches during the season as Liberty Professionals finished 11th and avoided relegation.

His performances attracted interest from Ashanti Gold, and he left Liberty Professionals ahead of the 2018 season after two seasons with the club.

=== Ashanti Gold ===
In March 2018, Mubarik joined Ashanti Gold on a two-year contract ahead of the 2018 Ghana Premier League season. He was brought in following the departures of defenders Abeiku Ainooson and Richard Ocran. Mubarik made his competitive debut on 28 March 2018, coming on as a late substitute in a 1–0 league victory over Karela United. He subsequently suffered an injury in June that kept him out for about five months, although the league season was later abandoned following the dissolution of the Ghana Football Association.

Mubarik returned to become a regular member of the Ashanti Gold defence and featured during the club's 2019–20 CAF Confederation Cup campaign. He also made 12 appearances during the 2019 GFA Normalization Committee Special Competition, helping Ashanti Gold top their group and subsequently win the Tier 2 competition, to qualify for the 2020–21 CAF Confederation Cup.

On 29 December 2019, Mubarik scored his first goal of the 2019–20 Ghana Premier League season, opening the scoring in a 3–0 victory over Great Olympics. A week later, he scored the only goal in a 1–0 victory over King Faisal, giving Ashanti Gold their second consecutive league victory.

Mubarik made 14 league appearances and scored twice during the 2019–20 season before the competition was cancelled due to the COVID-19 pandemic. He left Ashanti Gold following the expiration of his contract in August 2020.

=== Asante Kotoko ===
Following the expiration of his contract with Ashanti Gold, Mubarik joined Asante Kotoko in September 2020, signing a three-year contract with the club ahead of the 2020–21 Ghana Premier League season and Kotoko's campaign in the 2020–21 CAF Champions League.

Mubarik established himself as a member of Kotoko's defence during his first season, making 19 league appearances as the club finished second in the 2020–21 Ghana Premier League. During the 2021–22 season, Mubarik made 21 league appearances as Kotoko won the Ghana Premier League title. The title was Kotoko's first league championship since the 2013–14 season.

Mubarik remained with Kotoko for the 2022–23 season and also featured for the club in the 2022–23 CAF Champions League. He made 16 league appearances and scored once during the season.

He left Asante Kotoko on 1 August 2023 following the expiration of his contract, ending a three-year spell with the club. Mubarik made more than 50 league appearances during his time with the Porcupine Warriors and was part of the squad that won the 2021–22 Ghana Premier League title.

=== FC Chitwan and Manila Digger ===
In November 2023, Mubarik moved abroad for the first time in his senior career, joining Nepalese club FC Chitwan ahead of the 2023–24 Nepal Super League. He spent the season with the club before departing at the end of the campaign.

Following his spell in Nepal, Mubarik joined Philippine club Manila Digger in 2024 and was registered for the club for the 2024 Philippines Football League season. He left the club at the end of the season and returned to Ghana to join Medeama.

=== Medeama ===
On 25 August 2024, Mubarik returned to Ghana and joined Medeama following his spell with Manila Digger in the Philippines. He became a regular member of the side during the 2024–25 Ghana Premier League season, making 18 league appearances.

Mubarik was subsequently appointed captain of Medeama and led the club during the 2025–26 Ghana Premier League season. On 21 December 2025, he scored from the penalty spot against his former club Asante Kotoko as Medeama took a two-goal lead before eventually drawing 2–2.

Mubarik captained Medeama to the 2025–26 Ghana Premier League title, the second league championship in the club's history. The title was secured following a 5–2 victory over Heart of Lions.

== International career ==
In February 2021, Mubarik was called up to the Ghana national football team ahead of the 2021 Africa Cup of Nations qualifiers against South Africa and São Tomé and Príncipe. He was subsequently recalled to the squad in March alongside Justice Blay, but did not make his senior international debut.

== Personal life ==
Mubarik is Muslim.

== Honours ==
Ashanti Gold

- GFA Normalization Committee Special Competition Tier 2: 2019

Asante Kotoko

- Ghana Premier League: 2021–22

Medeama

- Ghana Premier League: 2025–26
- Ghana Super Cup: 2026
