= Frank Adjei =

Ghanaian footballer (born 2004)

Personal information
- Full name: Frank Junior Adjei
- Date of birth: 20 March 2004 (age 22)
- Height: 1.77 m (5 ft 10 in)
- Position: Midfielder

Team information
- Current team: Hammarby IF
- Number: 28

Youth career
- Vision
- Golden Boys Academy

Senior career*
Years	Team	Apps	(Gls)
2021–2022	Bibiani Gold Stars	14	(1)
2022–2025	IFK Värnamo	51	(2)
2025–	Hammarby IF	36	(4)
- * Club domestic league appearances and goals as of 7 November 2026

Frank Junior Adjei (born 20 March 2004) is a Ghanaian footballer who plays as a midfielder for Hammarby IF.

After spending time in the Golden Boys Academy, Adjei played in the Ghana Premier League for Bibiani Gold Stars, scoring one goal during the 2021–22 season. He was signed by Swedish team IFK Värnamo in the summer of 2022.

He went through "acclimatization" in 2022, and also played seldomly throughout 2023. In the 2024 Allsvenskan, Adjei started more than 2/3 of the games and appearing in all but three league games. According to Expressen, Adjei was now monitored by a number of Belgian clubs, namely Sporting Charleroi, Kortrijk, Beerschot and OH Leuven. He remained in Värnamo as of January 2025. He established himself as a "number 8" or "number 10", though IFK Värnamo trailed in last place on the league table. Transfer rumours arose again in the summer of 2025, with Swedish top clubs being mentioned.

In the summer of 2025, Adjei signed for Hammarby IF.
