= Wahab Adams =

Ghanaian professional footballer

Personal information
- Date of birth: 25 November 1993 (age 32)
- Place of birth: Kumasi, Ghana
- Position: Defender

Senior career*
| Years | Team | Apps | (Gls) |
| 2009–2017 | Aduana Stars | 52+ | (0) |
| 2018–2021 | Asante Kotoko | 29 | (0) |
| 2021–2024 | Wolkite Ketema | 54 | (2) |
- * Club domestic league appearances and goals

Wahab Adams (born 25 November 1993) is a Ghanaian professional footballer who last played as defender for Ethiopian Premier League side Wolkite Ketema. He previously played for Ghanaian clubs Aduana Stars and Asante Kotoko.

== Club career ==
=== Aduana Stars ===
Adams featured for Sekondi Hasaacas before securing a move to play for Aduana Stars. Adams played for Aduana Stars from 2009 to 2017. He was part of the team that won the club's first Ghana Premier League title in the 2009–10 season. In the 2016 season, he made 29 league appearances as Aduana finished second.

During the 2017 season, Adams remained a regular member of the team, making 23 league appearances as Aduana won their second Ghana Premier League title.

=== Asante Kotoko ===
After eight years with Aduana Stars, Adams joined Asante Kotoko in December 2017 on a two-year deal. He made his league debut for the club on 17 March 2018, in a 1–1 draw against WAFA. He made 13 league appearances during the 2018 season before the competition was abandoned following the dissolution of the Ghana Football Association in June 2018.

Adams subsequently featured for Kotoko in continental competition and was part of the team that reached the group stage of the 2018–19 CAF Confederation Cup. He helped Kotoko reach the group stage of the competition and was also part of the team that won the 2019 GFA Normalization Committee Special Competition. In December 2019, he signed a new two-year contract with Kotoko.

During the 2020–21 season, Adams struggled for regular playing time, with Ismail Abdul Ganiyu and Yusif Mubarik preferred in central defence. In March 2021, reports emerged that he had requested to leave Kotoko because of his limited playing time, although his agent subsequently denied that he had submitted a transfer request. Adams was eventually released by Kotoko on 17 September 2021, three months before the expiration of his contract.

=== Wolkite Ketema ===
In August 2021, Adams was linked with a move to Ethiopian club Wolkite Ketema while still under contract with Asante Kotoko. Kotoko subsequently opened an investigation into the reported move and requested that Adams respond to allegations concerning his conduct. Adams denied any wrongdoing.

In September 2021, Kotoko released Adams from his contract, allowing him to join a club of his choice. He subsequently joined Wolkite Ketema. After joining Wolkite Ketema, Adams stated that his salary in Ethiopia was about seven times what he had earned at Asante Kotoko, and called for improved remuneration for players in the Ghana Premier League. In March 2022, Adams claimed that officials of the Ethiopian Football Federation (EFF) had approached him about the possibility of becoming naturalised and representing the Ethiopia national football team. The EFF's General Secretary, Bahiru Tilahun, publicly denied the claim, describing it as untrue and calling on Adams to stop misleading Ghanaians.

== Personal life ==
In May 2020, Adams mentioned in an interview with Light FM that, in 3 years of joining Asante Kotoko, he used his salaries to build a house and set up businesses which was bringing him relevant income.

== Honours ==
Aduana Stars

- Ghana Premier League: 2009–10, 2017
- Ghana Super Cup: 2018

Asante Kotoko

- GFA Normalization Committee Special Competition: 2019

Wolkite Ketema

- Tana Cup: 2022
