= Prince Asempa =

Ghanaian professional footballer

Personal information
- Date of birth: 24 March 2000 (age 26)
- Place of birth: Ghana
- Position: Goalkeeper

Team information
- Current team: Karela United
- Number: 44

Youth career
- 2014–2016: Bechem United

Senior career*
Years	Team	Apps	(Gls)
2016–2022	Bechem United	50	(0)
2022–	Karela United	17	(0)

International career
2016	Ghana U17	2	(0)
- * Club domestic league appearances and goals as of 2 January 2022

Prince Asempa (born 26 March 2000) is a Ghanaian professional footballer who plays as goalkeeper for Ghanaian Premier League side Karela United. He previously played for Bechem United F.C.

Making his debut at the age 16, he won the Ghanaian FA Cup in 2016 during his debut season, making him the youngest player to play in the final and the youngest player to win the cup.

== Early life ==
Asempa was born on 26 March 2000, in Bechem in the Ahafo Region of Ghana. He had his secondary school education at Presbyterian Senior High School Bechem (PRESEC) where he played in the school's football team before being scouted by Eddy Ansah and joining Bechem United academy as a teenager.

== Club career ==
After being scouted by Bechem United's goalkeeper's coach Eddy Ansah, Asempa joined the Bechem United academy in 2015–2016. He was promoted to the senior team in 2016 as the club's second goalkeeper and he made his debut during the 2016 Ghana Premier League season. He was named on the team's squad bench for the first time on 10 April 2016 in a match against International Allies. Following an injury to Ernest Adu, the main goalkeeper, he was given his debut on 26 June 2016 at the age of 16, helping them to secure a 2–1 victory over rivals Aduana Stars. In July 2016, he kept three clean sheets in five matches, with the clean sheets coming in matches against Asante Kotoko, Techiman City and Berekum Chelsea. His clean sheet against Berekum Chelsea contributed to them winning by 2–0 over their other fierce rivals. He ended the league season with 4 clean sheets out of 10 matches.

During the 2016 Ghana FA Cup, Asempa became the main goalkeeper, just as he became the main goalkeeper for the league season. Due to his exploits in both the league and FA Cup, Asempa made Manuel Zachariah's 21 man squad for the final amidst being the least experienced within the squad. He went on and played the full 90 minutes in final as Bechem United won by 2–1 against Okwawu United through a brace from Yaw Annor to clinch the trophy for the first time in the club's history. During the match, he made some impressive saves to prevent Danso Akoto from scoring. At 16 years, starting the match made him the youngest player to start an FA Cup final and the victory made him the youngest player to win the FA Cup. In October 2016, at the end of the season, he was nominated for the goalkeeper of the season and most promising player of the season awards. He however did not win any of the awards, even though he expressed his interest in wanting to win both to serve as a boost to his career.

During the 2019–20 season, he served as the club captain of the club replacing Daniel Egyin who had joined Medeama SC. He continued to serve as club captain along with Moro Salifu during the 2020–21 Ghana Premier League.

In February 2022, Asempa joined fellow Ghana Premier League side Karela United after only playing once for Bechem in the first round of the season.

== International career ==
In 2016, Asempa was the first choice goalkeeper of the Ghana national under-17 football team. He made his debut in March 2016 during the 4-nations tournament in Namibia which featured Germany. He helped Ghana to first-place finish after scoring 8–0 against Namibia and scoring their German counterparts 2–1. At the end of the tournament, he was adjudged the best goalkeeper. He however suffered an injury which resulted in him being left out of the squad for both the 2017 Africa U-17 Cup of Nations and 2017 FIFA U-17 World Cup tournaments.

In 2018, he was also called up to the Ghana national under-20 football team ahead of the 2019 Africa U-20 Cup of Nations qualifiers.

== Honours ==
Bechem United

- Ghana FA Cup: 2016

Ghana U17

- Four Nations Tournament: 2016
- Four Nations Tournament Best Goalkeeper: 2016
