= Ocran =

Ocran may refer to:

- Ocran (biblical figure)
- Ocran, Virginia
- Ocran (surname)
