= Ocran (surname) =

Ocran is a surname. Notable people with the surname include:

- A. K. Ocran, Ghanaian military personnel
- Albert Kwesi Ocran (1929–2019), Ghanaian soldier and politician
- Comfort Ocran, Ghanaian motivational speaker and author
- Emmanuel Ocran (born 1996), Ghanaian footballer
- Lee Ocran (died 2019), Ghanaian politician
- Richard Ocran (born 1993), Ghanaian footballer
- Samuel Ocran (born 1986), Ghanaian footballer
- Tawia Modibo Ocran (1942–2008), Ghanaian academic and judge
- Wilberforce Ocran (born 1999), British footballer
