= Boadu =

Boadu is a surname meaning Helper hunter the one who is strong. Notable people with the surname include:

- James Boadu (born 1985), Ghanaian footballer
- Mavis Nkansah Boadu (born 1989), Ghanaian politician
- Myron Boadu (born 2001), Dutch footballer
- Richard Boadu (born 1998), Ghanaian footballer
