= Daniel Egyin =

Ghanaian footballer (born 1990)

Personal information
- Date of birth: 5 November 1990 (age 35)
- Place of birth: Ghana
- Position: Defender

Team information
- Current team: Medeama

Youth career
- Sekondi Hasaacas

Senior career*
Years	Team	Apps	(Gls)
2011–2016 (Note: Statistics are from 2016 Ghana Premier League (remaining stats unknown))	Sekondi Hasaacas	26	(0)
2017–2018	Bechem United	39	(2)
2018–	Medeama	40	(0)
- * Club domestic league appearances and goals as of 20:58, 23 November 2021 (UTC)

Daniel Egyin (born 5 November 1990) is a Ghanaian professional footballer who plays as defender for Ghana Premier League side Medeama S.C. He previously played for and captained both Sekondi Hasaacas and Bechem United.

== Club career ==
=== Sekondi Hasaacas ===
Egyin played for Sekondi Hasaacas and served as captain of the side in 2016. During the 2016 Ghana Premier League, he served as captain and played in 26 league matches but could not prevent Sekondi Hasaacas from being relegated to the Ghana Division One League. As a standout performer within the season, he was linked with transfers to Medeama SC and Bechem United after his contract with Sekondi expired.

=== Bechem United ===
In October 2016, Egyin signed for Ahafo-based club Bechem United F.C. for a free transfer. He signed a two-year contract as the club sort to boost their squad ahead of their debut CAF Confederation Cup campaign and the 2017 Ghanaian Premier League. He made his league debut on 22 February 2017, playing the full 90 minutes in a 1–0 loss Kumasi Asante Kotoko. In his debut season, he played 23 out of 30 league matches, helping the club to place 10th and prevent relegation on the final day of the season after a 1–0 victory over Accra Great Olympics.

In 2018, in his second season, after the departure of Asante Agyemang, he was appointed as the new club captain of the side. In April 2018, after a poor start to the season, Egyin admitted that the departure of several first team players like striker Ahmed Toure and captain Asante Agyemang had affected their outfit but the club remained optimistic of surviving. In the 2018 Ghana Premier League season, he played in 14 league matches and scored 2 goals out of 15 matches before the league was abandoned due to the dissolution of the Ghana Football Association (GFA) in June 2018, as a result of the Anas Number 12 Expose.

=== Medeama SC ===
In February 2019, Egyin was signed by Tarkwa-based side Medeama SC who missed out on securing him in 2016. He signed a 2-year contract with the club as his contract with Bechem United had expired. He played in all matches during the 2019 GFA Normalization Committee Special Competition, to help Medeama to a 3rd-place finish in group A. During the 2019–20 Ghana Premier League season, he played in all 15 league matches before the league was cancelled as a result of the COVID-19 pandemic.
