= Michael Osei (footballer, born 1971) =

Ghanaian footballer (1971–2024)

Personal information
- Date of birth: 15 September 1971
- Place of birth: Kumasi, Ghana
- Date of death: 15 November 2024 (aged 53)
- Place of death: London
- Height: 1.78 m (5 ft 10 in)
- Position: Midfielder

Senior career*
Years	Team	Apps	(Gls)
1980s–1989	Okwawu United		
1989–1992	Asante Kotoko		
1992–1993	Vorwärts Steyr	13	(0)
1993–1995	Eintracht Frankfurt	0	(0)
1996	Caracas		
1996–1997	Mainz 05	5	(1)
1997–1998	Vanspor	2	(0)
1998–1999	Weismain	7	(1)
1999	Viktoria Aschaffenburg		
2000–2003	KV Mühlheim		
2003–2005	SV Erlenbach		
2005–2006	Alemannia Haibach		

International career
1990	Ghana	3	(0)

Managerial career
- 2016–2017: Asante Kotoko
- 2017–2018: Liberty Professionals
- 2018–2021: Star Madrid
- 2021–2023: Bibiani Gold Stars
- * Club domestic league appearances and goals

Michael Osei (15 September 1971 – 15 November 2024) was a Ghanaian football coach and player who was most recently the head coach of Bibiani Gold Stars. A midfielder, was well known for playing for Asante Kotoko, Vorwärts Steyr in Austria and Mainz 05 in Germany. He also had spells with other clubs in Venezuela, Turkey and lower tier sides in Germany.

Osei was a head coach of Asante Kotoko and Liberty Professionals. He was a frequent commentator on issues relating to sports in Ghana.

== Club career ==
=== Early years and Asante Kotoko ===
Born and bred in Asawase a suburb of Kumasi, Osei started his career with Suame-based Anokye Stars a colts football team, before joining Neoplan Stars, both in Kumasi. He moved to Nkawkaw-based club Okwawu United F.C. in the 1980s and played alongside his cousin Tony Yeboah, he later moved to Kumasi Asante Kotoko in 1989. He won the Ghana Premier League twice during his stay with the club, in 1991 and 1992.

=== Vorwärts Steyr ===
In the later part of 1992, Osei moved outside Ghana and signed for Austrian team Vorwärts Steyr. He played for the club for one season. He made his league debut on 15 March 1992 coming on as a substitute in the late minutes of a 1–0 win against FC Blau-Weiß Linz. He continued to play for club in the Austrian Bundesliga making five appearances in his debut season in the 1992–93 season and went on further to make eight appearances in the 1993–94 season, bringing his total number of league appearances to 13 before leaving the club.

=== Eintracht Frankfurt ===
Osei moved to Germany and transferred to Eintracht Frankfurt in 1993, in the process joining his Ghanaian colleague, former teammate at Okwawu United and cousin Tony Yeboah.

=== Caracas ===
In 1996, Osei joined, Venezuelan Primera División giants Caracas F.C. playing in 1995–96 season and featuring in the Copa Libertadores for a season. He made four appearances in 1996 Copa Libertadores.

=== Mainz 05 ===
After leaving Caracas FC, Osei joined Mainz 05 in 1996 and in the process being in the same squad and playing alongside people like German coach Jürgen Klopp, Torsten Lieberknecht, Bruno Akrapović, and Dimo Wache. He played for the club for one season making five appearances scoring one goal in the 2. Bundesliga. He scored his only goal with the club in a match against 1. FC Lokomotive Leipzig on 6 August 1996, the match ended in a 2–1 home win. He left the club in 1997.

=== Later career ===
Osei joined now defunct Turkish club Vanspor in 1997. After leaving Vanspor in 1998, Osei went on to play for German lower tier sides SC Weismain-Obermain for a season, Viktoria Aschaffenburg for a season, KV Mühlheim for three seasons, SV Erlenbach for two seasons and finally retiring after playing one season with Alemannia Haibach in 2006.

== International career ==
Osei was a member of the Ghana national team in the early 1990s whilst playing for Asante Kotoko, he received call ups into the team through the then coach Burkhard Ziese. His most notable performance for the team was playing in the 1992 African Cup of Nations qualifiers ahead of the 1992 African Cup of Nations. He played alongside players like Emmanuel Armah, Frimpong Manso, Abedi Pele and James Kwesi Appiah within that period.

== Managerial career ==
=== Asante Kotoko ===
Osei started his coaching career in 2012 as the assistant coach for New Edubiase United. He later joined his former club Asante Kotoko as an assistant coach to Dramani Mas-Ud Didi ahead of 2013–14 Ghanaian Premier League. That season as assistant coach, Asante Kotoko won a treble the MTN FA Cup, First Capital Plus Premier League and Super Cup. The following season David Duncan took over as coach but Osei was maintained. After a poor start to the season, Duncan was sacked in May 2016 and he was appointed as interim coach. He served in that capacity until the following season when Zdravko Logarušić was appointed as head coach and he moved back into his initial role as the assistant of the club. Two weeks after Logarušić's appointment, he parted ways with the club in January 2017. During his tenure as the head coach, he won the Ghana Presidential Cup in 2016, helped them to a fifth-place finish and the semi-finals of the FA Cup.

=== Liberty Professionals ===
Osei joined Dansoman-based side Liberty Professionals in May 2017 on a two-year contract as head coach mid-way of the 2017 Ghana Premier league season after the club was experiencing a bad run of matches. After his appointment, the club's Director George Afriyie expressed confidence in him changing the fortunes of the club. In his first two matches Liberty picked up one point each as they were held by draws against Hearts of Oak and Tema Youth and he expressed his satisfaction with his team's performance even though they were yet to pick a win. The club subsequently placed 11th and escaped relegation by four points after winning their final match against his former club Kumasi Asante Kotoko by 2–1 with goals from club captain Samuel Sarfo and Samuel Adjei Annan. He left the club in February 2018 before the start of the 2018 Ghanaian Premier League even though he showed his excitement of coaching the club ahead of the season.

=== Bibiani Gold Stars ===
In August 2021, after Bibiani Gold Stars gained promotion into Ghana Premier League from the Division One League for the first time in the club's history, Osei was appointed the head coach of the club after Kobina Amissah resigned.

== Personal life and death ==
Osei was cousins with former Ghanaian international footballer Tony Yeboah, who he played with at Okwawu United and Eintracht Frankfurt.

Osei died on 15 November 2024, aged 53, after cardiac issues over previous months.

== Honours ==
=== Player ===
Asante Kotoko

- Ghana Premier League: 1990–91, 1991–92
- Ghana SWAG Cup: 1990, 1991, 1992
- Ghana President's Cup: 1990

=== Manager ===
Asante Kotoko

- Ghanaian Premier League: 2013–14 (Note: He won the league as assistant coach)
- Ghanaian FA Cup: 2014 (Note: Michael Osei was in charge of the final in the absence Dramani Mas-Ud Didi.)
- Ghana President's Cup: 2016
- GHALCA Top 6: 2016

Individual

- Ghana Premier League Manager of the Month: November 2022
