= Franck Etouga =

Cameroonian footballer (born 2001)

Personal information
- Full name: Franck Mbella Thierry Etouga
- Date of birth: 18 September 2001 (age 25)
- Place of birth: Cameroon
- Position: Forward

Team information
- Current team: CR Belouizdad
- Number: 7

Youth career
- Nkufo Academy

Senior career*
Years	Team	Apps	(Gls)
–2020	Nkufo Academy	30	(61)
2020–2021	AS Fortuna de Mfou	21	(8)
2021–2022	Asante Kotoko	30	(21)
2022–2025	Al Masry	12	(2)
2024	→ El Gouna (loan)	14	(1)
2024–2025	→ Spartanii Sportul (loan)	5	(0)
2025	Haras El Hodoud	0	(0)
2025–2026	USM Khenchela	29	(9)
2026–	CR Belouizdad	0	(0)

International career^{‡}
2020–	Cameroon		
- * Club domestic league appearances and goals as of 10 July 2026 ‡ National team caps and goals as of 14 November 2021

Franck Mbella Thierry Etouga (born 18 September 2001) is a Cameroonian footballer who plays as a forward for Algerian Ligue Professionnelle 1 club CR Belouizdad. Etouga previously played for Nkufo Academy before joining Fortuna de Mfou and Ghanaian club Kumasi Asante Kotoko.

Within a season of joining Asante Kotoko he is regarded as one of the most prolific attackers in the Ghana Premier League.

== Club career ==
Etouga started his career with Nkufo Academy, an academy owned by Swiss international of African descent Blaise Nkufo. At the academy Etouga scored 61 goals and provided 13 assists in 30 games. He went on to join Fortuna de Mfou in 2020. At Fortuna, he scored eight goals and assisted nine in 21 matches as the club placed third in the Cameroon Elite One League helping the club to a third-place finish. In the third place playoff match, Etouga inspired Fortuna to a 5–0 victory over Fovu Club de Baham by scoring two goals and providing an assist.

On 12 October 2021, Etouga signed for Asante Kotoko on a three-year deal and was to join the club in Dubai who were in a pre-season tour in UAE. Prior to his signing Kotoko had signed his compatriot Georges Mfegue making him the second Cameroonian to join the club in two days. He made his debut for the Porcupine warriors on 28 November 2021 coming on the 90th minute to make a cameo debut in a goalless draw against Karela United. On 15 December 2021, on his full debut for the club and scored his debut goal in the 49th minute of an eventual 1–1 draw against Real Tamale United. In the next match against Legon Cities, he scored a brace including scoring the winning goal to grant Kotoko a 2–1 victory. On 9 January 2022, Etouga scored a second half hat-trick in the Ashanti derby against Obuasi-based club Ashanti Gold.

Etouga scored his second hat-trick of the season on 12 February 2022 scoring all three goals in a 3–1 victory over Accra Lions. As of February 2022, he was leading the top goal scorer's chart and had reportedly become a transfer target for several clubs in France and Turkey.

On 21 July 2025, he joined Algerian club USM Khenchela.

On 10 July 2026, he joined Algerian club CR Belouizdad.

== Management ==
He is managed by Royal Soccer Scout Management by popular Cameroonian football agent Amadou Fontem Tigana dubbed the "Jorge Mendes of Africa"

== International career ==
Etouga was a member of the Cameroon U-20 national team in 2020. He was named in the team's squad list for the UNIFFAC U-20 Nations Cup which also serves as qualifiers for the 2021 Africa U-20 Cup of Nations. He scored one goal in their 3–1 victory over Congo. Cameroon won the competition and qualified for the Africa U-20 Cup of Nations. He however missed out on the squad for the 2021 Africa U-20 Cup of Nations.

== Honours ==
Asante Kotoko

- Ghana Premier League: 2021–22

Cameroon U-20

- UNIFFAC U-20 Nations Cup: 2020

Individual

- VAR Player of the Month: March 2021
- Ghana Premier League Player of the month: January 2022
- Ghana Premier League Most Outstanding Player of the season: 2021–22
