= Üzüm =

Üzüm is a surname. Notable people with the surname include:

- Fıratcan Üzüm (born 1999), Turkish footballer
- Telat Üzüm (born 1963), Turkish footballer
