= USS Joseph F. Bellows =

Minesweeper of the United States Navy

History

United States
- Name: USS Joseph F. Bellows
- Namesake: A former name retained
- Owner: Bellows and Squires, Inc., Ocran, Virginia
- Builder: E. James Tull, Pocomoke City, Maryland
- Laid down: date unknown
- Completed: 1912
- Acquired: by the Navy in May 1917
- Commissioned: 18 May 1917
- Decommissioned: unknown date
- Stricken: unknown date
- Homeport: Norfolk, Virginia
- Fate: Sold 2 July 1919; fate unknown

General characteristics
- Type: fishing steamer
- Displacement: 315 tons
- Length: 162 ft (49 m)
- Beam: 24 ft (7.3 m)
- Draft: 14 ft (4.3 m)
- Propulsion: steam engine
- Speed: 13 knots
- Complement: not known
- Armament: One 6-pounder gun

USS Joseph F. Bellows (SP-323) was a fishing boat purchased by the U.S. Navy during World War I. She was outfitted as an armed minesweeper and was assigned to the Virginia coast. Post-war she served as a tender and supply ship until sold in 1919.

== Built in Maryland ==
Joseph F. Bellows (SP-323), a fishing steamer built in 1912 by E. J. Tull, Pocomoke City, Maryland, was acquired by the Navy from Bellows and Squires, Inc., Ocran, Virginia, in May 1917. She commissioned 18 May 1917.

== World War I service ==
Assigned to the 5th Naval District at Norfolk, Virginia, Joseph F. Bellows operated as a minesweeper off Cape Henry and in the convoy channel to Hampton Roads, Virginia.

== Post-war service ==
After the armistice ending World War I was signed, she acted as a lightship tender and a supply ship until July 1919.

== Decommissioning and sale ==
Joseph F. Bellows was sold 2 July 1919 to NcNeal Dodson Co., Inc., Reedville, Virginia.

== See also ==
- USS Peter C. Struven (SP-332)
