= Abdulai Iddrisu =

Ghanaian professional footballer

Personal information
- Full name: Abdulai Iddrisu
- Date of birth: 14 May 1997 (age 29)
- Place of birth: Ghana
- Position: Goalkeeper

Team information
- Current team: Ethio Electric SC
- Number: 1

Senior career*
Years	Team	Apps	(Gls)
2020–2023	Bechem United	46	(0)
2023 – 2024	Azam FC		
2024 —	Ethio Electric SC	25	
- * Club domestic league appearances and goals as of 25 April 2021

Abdulai Iddrisu (born 14 May 1997) is a Ghanaian professional footballer who plays as goalkeeper for Ethiopian Premier League side Ethio Electric S.C.

== Early life ==
Iddrisu was born on 14 May 1997 in Sawla in the Sawla-Tuna-Kalba District of the Savannah Region. He started playing football as a goalkeeper at the age 13 in primary school after his sports master discovered his talent and football skills. Throughout his basic school level, he manned the post for every school he attended, participating in Inter-School and District Sports Competitions.

== Career ==
BECHEM UNITED FC

Iddrisu joined Bechem United in October 2020, ahead of the 2020–21 season. He made his debut on 7 February 2020, in their 3–1 home victory over Accra Great Olympics. He was given his first start of the season after playing second fiddle for majority of the season to either Prince Asempah or Daniel Afadzwu.He later became the first choice goalkeeper in that season. In the 2021/2022 season, Abdulai Iddrisu kept 18 clean sheets in 31 games, he also became the first goalkeeper to keep 7 consecutive clean sheets in a season. He was awarded the best goalkeeper award in Ghana ahead of Ibrahim Danlad of kotoko and Jojo Walcott of chalton athletics.

AZAM FOOTBALL CLUB

Abdulai Iddrisu joined Azam F.C. in the Tanzanian Premier League in 2023 after leaving Ghana Premier League side, Bechem United F.C. after putting out a splendid performance in the 2022/2023 Ghana Premier League.

ETHIO ELECTRIC SC

The Ghanaian shot stopper, Abdulai Iddrisu joined the Ethiopian Premier League side, Ethio Electric S.C. at the beginning of the 2024/2025 football season in Ethiopia. He made an credible mark in his first season in the Ethiopian soil. He made 25 appearance adding to his name 13 clean sheets.
