= Moro Salifu =

Ghanaian footballer (born 1998)

Personal information
- Date of birth: 15 December 1998 (age 27)
- Place of birth: Tamale, Ghana
- Position: Midfielder

Team information
- Current team: Nejmeh

Senior career*
Years	Team	Apps	(Gls)
2016	Medeama	9	(0)
2017–2019	Bechem United	14	(1)
2019	AFAD Djékanou	–	(–)
2019–2021	Bechem United	34	(9)
2021–2025	Al-Ittihad	99	(1)
2026–	Nejmeh	0	(0)
- * Club domestic league appearances and goals as of 3 August 2023

Moro Salifu (born 15 December 1998) is a Ghanaian professional footballer who plays as a midfielder. He previously played for Ghana Premier League sides Bechem United and Medeama SC, whilst having a short stint at Ivorian team Academie de Foot Amadou Diallo.

== Club career ==
=== Medeama SC ===
Salifu started his career with Tarkwa-based club Medeama SC. He made his debut during the 2016 Ghana Premier League season. He played his first match on 6 March 2016 in a 2–2 draw against Kumasi Asante Kotoko, coming on at half time for Paul Aidoo. He ended his first season with 9 league matches and 1 CAF Confederation Cup.

=== Bechem United ===
After a full season with Medeama, Salifu joined Bechem United in 2017. He made his debut on 22 February 2017 in a 1–0, coming on in the 40th minute for Joseph Amoah. His first professional goal came on 27 August 2018 in a 1–0 league win over Ashanti Gold. He made 14 league appearances and scored 1 goal in the 2017 Ghana Premier League.

=== AFAD Djékanou ===
In March 2019, Salifu moved to Ivory Coast and joined Ivory Coast Ligue 1 side Academie de Foot Amadou Diallo, after being linked with a move to ASEC Mimosas and Algerian top side ES Sétif. He signed a two-year contract with the club, however played there for a season.

=== Return to Bechem United ===
Salifu returned to Ghana and joined his former club Bechem United ahead of the 2019–20 season. In his return, he played 10 league matches and scored 2 goals, before the league was cancelled due to the outbreak of the COVID-19 in Ghana. After that impressive short season, he was linked with a move to Kumasi giants Asante Kotoko as a backup and future midfield partner for Justice Blay. He however did not join Asante Kotoko and was appointed as the club captain ahead of the 2020–21 Ghana Premier League season. He ended the season as one of the highly rated midfielders, with 7 goals (6 penalty kicks) in 24 matches and won five man of the match awards.

=== Al Ittihad Alexandria Club ===
On 29 August 2021, Egyptian club Al Ittihad Alexandria Club announced that they had signed Salifu on a three-year contract until 2024. This was after he had been on the radar of several clubs including fellow Egyptian club Al Masry and Ghanaian clubs Asante Kotoko and Hearts of Oak.

== International career ==
Salifu has previously played for the Ghana national under-17 team. In 2018–2019, he was an integral member of the Ghana national under-23 team during their 2019 Africa U-23 Cup of Nations qualifiers for the 2020 Tokyo Summer Olympics.

Salifu was handed a late call-up into the Ghana national football team in June 2021, ahead of friendly matches against Morocco and Ivory Coast.

== Personal life ==
Salifu is Muslim.

== Honours ==
Medeama SC

- Ghana Super Cup: 2016
