= Roland Amouzou =

Ghanaian professional footballer

Roland Hermann Kossivi Amouzou (born 18 December 1994) is a Togolese professional footballer who plays as a defender for Ghanaian Premier League side Ashanti Gold.

== Career ==
Before moving to Ashanti Gold in 2017, Amouzou played for Sekondi Hasaacas. Since 2017 he has plied his trade with Obuasi-based club Ashanti Gold. He was a member of the squad that played in the 2020–21 CAF Confederation Cup.
