= Kofi Agbesimah =

Ghanaian professional footballer

Kofi Agbesimah (born 18 February 1997) is a Ghanaian professional footballer who plays as defender for Ghanaian Premier League side Bechem United F.C.

== Career ==
Agbesimah started his career with Bechem United F.C in 2018 and made his debut for the club in the 2018 Ghana Premier League. He made his debut on 16 March 2018, in a 3–0 loss to International Allies. He made 12 league matches and scored a goal before the league was cancelled due to the dissolution of the Ghana Football Association in June 2018, as a result of the Anas Number 12 Expose. On 23 May 2018, he scored his debut goal against Liberty Professionals even though they lost the match by 2–1. He made 2019 GFA Normalization Competition, he made 12 appearances and scored a goal.

In 2019, Agbesimah continued to enjoy game time as he began to play a more prominent role in the team. Before the league was truncated due to the COVID-19 pandemic, he played all 15 league matches. His role as the key central defender for the club became more obvious during the 2020–21 season of which he threw a challenge to Asante Kotoko and stated that the Brazilian playmaker Fabio Gama had no chance against their defence. On 9 May 2021, he scored his first goal of the season against Karela United in a match that saw the club lose through to goals from Diawisie Taylor and Reginald Thompson.
