= Romain Folz =

French football manager

Personal information
- Date of birth: 28 June 1990 (age 36)
- Place of birth: Bordeaux, France

Managerial career
- Years: Team
- 2018: West Virginia United
- 2019: Uganda (assistant)
- 2019–2020: Pyramids (assistant)
- 2020: Bechem United
- 2020–2021: Niort (assistant)
- 2021: Ashanti Gold
- 2021–2022: Township Rollers
- 2022: Marumo Gallants
- 2022–2023: AmaZulu
- 2023–2024: Horoya
- 2024-2025: Mamelodi Sundowns (assistant)
- 2025-2025: Young Africans

Romain Folz (born 28 June 1990) is a French football manager.

== Career ==
In 2018, Folz was appointed manager of American side West Virginia United. In 2019, he was appointed assistant manager of Uganda. After that, he was appointed assistant manager of Pyramids in Egypt. In 2020, Folz was appointed manager of Ghanaian club Bechem United. After that, he was appointed assistant manager of Niort in France.

In 2021, he was appointed manager of Ghanaian team Ashanti Gold. After that, Folz was appointed manager of Township Rollers in Botswana.

In 2022, he moved to South Africa for the first time as he was appointed manager of South African side Marumo Gallants. He was the youngest manager in the Premier Division. He managed AmaZulu from 2022 until 2023. In April 2023 Romain Folz was redeployed as technical director.

He moved on to Guinea's Horoya AC in August 2023. In July 2024, he joined Mamelodi Sundowns F.C. as an assistant coach until 10 December 2024 when he was relieved of his duties.

On July 23 2025 at 9:15Pm He was announced new Head coach of The East Africa's Giants Africans Africans and served the club for 3 months and the contract was terminated on 18 October 2025.

=== Managerial record ===
As of match played 18 October 2025

Managerial record by team and tenure
Team	Nat	From	To	Record					Ref.
Team	Nat	From	To	G	W	D	L	Win %	Ref.
Young Africans	(Tanzania)	2025	2025	6	4	1	1	66.67	
Career Total				6	4	1	1	66.67	—
