= Sampson Eduku =

Ghanaian footballer

Personal information
- Full name: Sampson Eduku
- Date of birth: 25 December 1995 (age 30)
- Place of birth: Sekondi-Takoradi, Ghana
- Height: 1.79 m (5 ft 10 in)
- Position: Forward

Senior career*
Years	Team	Apps	(Gls)
2013-2014	Eleven Wise	15	(9)
2014-2017	Karela United FC	71	(31)
2018-2019	Elmina Sharks	7	(2)
2019-2020	Sekondi Hasaacas FC	10	(6)
- * Club domestic league appearances and goals

Sampson Eduku is a Ghanaian professional footballer who recently played for Sekondi Hasaacas as a forward.

== Club career ==
=== Early career ===
Eduku began his playing career in the Ghana with Eleven Wise.

=== Karela United FC ===
He joined Premier League club Karela United FC before the start of the 2014-2015 Premier League season.

=== Elmina Sharks ===
He joined Elmina Sharks on 8 February 2018, signing a two-year deal with an option of an additional year.

=== Sekondi Hasaacas FC ===
On 27 December 2019, Sampson joined Sekondi Hasaacas FC. The forward signed a two-year contract.
