= Ismail Abdul-Ganiyu =

Ghanaian footballer (born 1996)

Personal information
- Date of birth: 12 June 1996 (age 30)
- Place of birth: Wa, Ghana
- Height: 1.84 m (6 ft 0 in)
- Position: Defender

Team information
- Current team: Ethiopian Insurance
- Number: 23

Senior career*
Years	Team	Apps	(Gls)
2013–2016	Wa All Stars	33+	(4+)
2017–2018	Karela United	15	(2)
2018–2022	Asante Kotoko	69	(6)
2022–2023	Al-Talaba		
2023	TP Mazembe		
2023–2025	Dire Dawa City	57	(2)
2025–	Ethiopian Insurance	31	(1)

International career
2021	Ghana	3	(0)
- * Club domestic league appearances and goals

Ismail Abdul-Ganiyu (born 12 June 1996) is a Ghanaian professional footballer who plays as a centre-back for Ethiopian club Ethiopian Insurance. He has also represented the Ghana national football team.

Abdul-Ganiyu began his senior career with Wa All Stars, where he was part of the team that won the 2016 Ghana Premier League. After spells with Olimpik Donetsk in Ukraine and Karela United, he joined Asante Kotoko in 2018. He later became club captain and helped Kotoko win the 2021–22 Ghana Premier League. He subsequently played abroad for Al-Talaba in Iraq, TP Mazembe in the Democratic Republic of the Congo and Dire Dawa City in Ethiopia before joining Ethiopian Insurance.

At international level, Abdul-Ganiyu represented Ghana at under-23 and home-based level before making his senior debut in March 2021. He made three appearances for the senior national team that year.

== Club career ==
=== Wa All Stars ===
Abdul-Ganiyu began his senior career with hometown club Wa All Stars in 2013. In February 2014, he scored from a free kick in a 3–0 league victory over Hearts of Oak. The following season, on 18 June 2015, he scored from the penalty spot as Wa All Stars again defeated Hearts of Oak, this time 2–0.

Abdul-Ganiyu became a key member of the Wa All Stars defence during the 2016 season, forming a defensive partnership with Ishaku Konda and Hafiz Adams. The club conceded 22 goals in 30 league matches as they won the Ghana Premier League title for the first time in their history. Abdul-Ganiyu made 26 league appearances and scored once during the title-winning campaign.

On 22 January 2017, he added the Ghana Super Cup to his honours as Wa All Stars defeated Bechem United 1–0, with Emmanuel Ocran scoring the only goal of the match.

=== Karela United ===
Following his departure from Wa All Stars, Abdul-Ganiyu moved to Ukraine and joined Olimpik Donetsk in 2017 on a two-year deal. In March 2017, he began training with the Ukrainian Premier League side. His stay in Ukraine was brief, and he subsequently parted ways with the club before returning to Ghana to join newly promoted Ghana Premier League side Karela United ahead of the 2017–18 season.

He made his Ghana Premier League debut for Karela on 17 March 2018, playing the full match in a 1–0 defeat to regional rivals Medeama. Abdul-Ganiyu established himself as a regular in the side and scored against Asante Kotoko in a 3–1 victory on 2 May 2018.

He played the full 90 minutes in all 15 of Karela's league matches during the truncated 2018 season, scoring two goals and winning three man-of-the-match awards before the competition was abandoned following the dissolution of the Ghana Football Association.

=== Asante Kotoko ===
In October 2018, Abdul-Ganiyu joined Asante Kotoko from Karela United, signing a three-year contract with the club ahead of their African campaign.

He made his competitive debut for Kotoko on 31 March 2019, starting alongside Wahab Adams in a 1–0 victory over Aduana Stars in the GFA Normalization Committee Special Competition. Abdul-Ganiyu established himself in the side during the competition and scored his first goal for the club from the penalty spot in a 1–0 victory over Eleven Wonders. He played the full 90 minutes in all 14 matches as Kotoko reached the championship play-off final. In the final against his former club Karela United, he converted his penalty in the shoot-out as Kotoko won 4–1 on penalties following a 1–1 draw to win the competition.

On 22 December 2019, Abdul-Ganiyu won the Ghana President's Cup with Kotoko after a 2–1 victory over rivals Hearts of Oak. He subsequently became an established member of Kotoko's defence and also represented the club in continental competition, featuring in both the CAF Champions League and CAF Confederation Cup.

During the 2020–21 Ghana Premier League season, Abdul-Ganiyu made 33 league appearances and scored four goals as Kotoko finished second in the league. His performances during the season earned him a call-up to the Ghana national team and a nomination for Home-based Footballer of the Year at the 2021 Ghana Football Awards.

On 7 October 2021, Abdul-Ganiyu was appointed captain of Asante Kotoko following the departures of Felix Annan and Emmanuel Gyamfi. He served as captain during the 2021–22 season, making 21 league appearances and scoring once as Kotoko won the Ghana Premier League title, their first league championship in eight years.

Abdul-Ganiyu left Kotoko in August 2022 after the two parties mutually agreed to terminate his contract for personal reasons.

=== Al-Talaba ===
On 20 September 2022, Abdul-Ganiyu moved abroad and joined Iraqi Premier League club Al-Talaba on a free transfer. He signed a one-year contract with an option for renewal following his departure from Asante Kotoko.

His stay with Al-Talaba was brief, and he left the club during the 2022–23 season before subsequently joining Congolese club TP Mazembe in February 2023.

=== TP Mazembe ===
On 2 February 2023, Abdul-Ganiyu joined Congolese club TP Mazembe as a free agent following his departure from Al-Talaba. He signed a two-and-a-half-year contract with an option for a further year and was assigned the number 28 shirt.

During his spell with Mazembe, Abdul-Ganiyu featured for the club in the 2022–23 CAF Confederation Cup. He made an appearance in the group stage of the competition.

On 5 September 2023, TP Mazembe announced that the club and Abdul-Ganiyu had reached an agreement to part ways, bringing his spell in Lubumbashi to an end.

=== Dire Dawa ===
Following his departure from TP Mazembe, Abdul-Ganiyu moved to Ethiopia and joined Dire Dawa City in September 2023. He established himself in the club's defence during the 2023–24 Ethiopian Premier League season. On 5 April 2024, Abdul-Ganiyu scored the winning goal in a 2–1 league victory over Fasil City, scoring three minutes after Dire Dawa had equalised.

Abdul-Ganiyu remained with Dire Dawa for the 2024–25 season, completing two seasons with the club before leaving in 2025.

=== Ethiopian Insurance ===
After two seasons with Dire Dawa City, Abdul-Ganiyu joined Ethiopian Insurance ahead of the 2025–26 season. He continued his career in the Ethiopian Premier League, becoming part of the club's defensive unit.

During the 2025–26 season, Abdul-Ganiyu featured regularly for Ethiopian Insurance and scored in a 1–1 league draw against Welwalo Adigrat on 30 May 2026.

In August 2026, Ethiopian Insurance announced that Abdul-Ganiyu would remain with the club for a further season after agreeing a one-year contract extension.

== International career ==
In 2014, Abdul-Ganiyu was a member of the Ghana under-23 team. He was part of the Black Meteors squad that faced Nigeria during the official opening of the newly built Godswill Akpabio International Stadium in Uyo on 7 November 2014, with Ghana losing the match 1–0.

In May 2016, Abdul-Ganiyu was called up to the Ghana A' national team for the MS&AD Cup against the Japan under-23 team. The match formed part of preparations for Japan ahead of the 2016 Summer Olympics and was also used to raise funds for victims of the 2016 Kumamoto earthquakes. Abdul-Ganiyu started the match as Ghana lost 3–0 to Japan.

In March 2021, Abdul-Ganiyu received a call-up to the senior Ghana national football team by head coach C. K. Akonnor, for the 2021 Africa Cup of Nations qualifiers against South Africa and São Tomé and Príncipe. He made his senior international debut on 25 March 2021, starting in central defence alongside Nicholas Opoku in a 1–1 draw with South Africa at the FNB Stadium in Johannesburg. The result secured Ghana's qualification for the 2021 Africa Cup of Nations.

Abdul-Ganiyu retained his place in the starting line-up for Ghana's final qualifier against São Tomé and Príncipe on 28 March, helping Ghana to a 3–1 victory in Accra as the Black Stars finished top of their qualifying group. On 12 June 2021, he made his third senior international appearance in a friendly against Ivory Coast at the Cape Coast Sports Stadium. He came on as a second-half substitute for Alexander Djiku as Ghana played out a goalless draw.

== Honours ==
Wa All Stars

- Ghana Premier League: 2016
- Ghana Super Cup: 2017

Asante Kotoko

- Ghana Premier League: 2021–22
- GFA Normalization Committee Special Competition: 2019
- President's Cup: 2019
