= Daniel Afadzwu =

Ghanaian professional footballer

Personal information
- Date of birth: 16 December 1995 (age 30)
- Place of birth: Ghana
- Position: Goalkeeper

Team information
- Current team: Nsoatreman
- Number: 1

Youth career
- –2016: Mpuasuman United

Senior career*
Years	Team	Apps	(Gls)
2018–2021	Bechem United	12	
2022–	Nsoatreman	52	(0)
- * Club domestic league appearances and goals as of 25 June 2023

Daniel Afadzwu (born 16 December 1995) is a Ghanaian professional footballer who plays as goalkeeper for Ghanaian Premier League side Nsoatreman F.C.

== Career ==
=== Mpuasuman United ===
Afadwzu started his career with lower-tier side Mpuasuman United, until he secured a move to Ghana Premier League side Bechem United in 2018.

=== Bechem United ===
Afadzwu joined Bechem United in June 2018, during the second round transfer period of the 2018 Ghana Premier League. He however did not make any appearances in 2018 since the league abandoned due to the dissolution of the GFA in June 2018, as a result of the Anas Number 12 Expose.

On 3 April 2019, during 2019 GFA Normalization Special Competition he made his debut and kept a clean sheet in a goalless draw against Ashanti Gold. He ended the competition with 11 league appearances during the, which he played 11 out of 12 league matches. The following season, the 2019–20 season, he played in 6 league matches before the league was cancelled due to restrictions from COVID-19 pandemic in Ghana.
