= Justice Blay =

Ghanaian footballer (born 1992)

Personal information
- Full name: Justice Blay
- Date of birth: 5 March 1992 (age 34)
- Place of birth: Sekondi, Ghana
- Height: 1.75 m (5 ft 9 in)
- Position: Defensive midfielder

Team information
- Current team: Asante Kotoko
- Number: 5

Senior career*
Years	Team	Apps	(Gls)
2015–2017	Sekondi Hasaacas	15	(1)
2017–2019	Medeama	44	(6)
2019–2020	→ Asante Kotoko (loan)	23	(2)
2020–	Medeama	0	(0)

International career
2017	Black Stars B	8	(0)
2019–	Ghana	3	(0)
- * Club domestic league appearances and goals

Justice Blay (born 5 May 1992) is a Ghanaian professional footballer who plays as a midfielder for Ghana Premier League club Asante Kotoko and the Ghana national team.

== Club career ==
Justice started his professional career at Sekondi Hasaacas F.C. and made his debut in the Ghana Premier League in 2016 when he made a total of 14 appearances for the 1977 Ghana Premier League title winners and scored 1 goal. Following a successful campaign at Hasaacas, Justice who is a defensive midfielder, caught the attention of Medeama who signed him in the following season into their squad. On his debut season for Medeama SC he made a total of 15 league appearances and scored once. In 2019 summer Asante Kotoko S.C. completed the signing of the midfielder on a season-long loan deal. While at Kotoko featured in the CAF Champions League and the CAF Confederation Cup. He scored a 2 goals in 12 appearances for Kotoko in the cancelled 2019/20 Ghana Premier League season. In 2020 summer he reverted from Kotoko to Medeama after the expiration of his loan contract.

== Transfer speculations ==
Following his return to Medeama several media reports claim Asante Kotoko have harboured plans to Justice permanently from Medeama. Meanwhile, some media reports claim Medeama SC have set a price tag of US$200,000 for interested clubs who want to sign the midfielder. Kotoko's bitterest rivals Accra Hearts of Oak S.C. reportedly entered into the race to sign the midfielder but both Hearts of Oak and Medeama denied the story.

== International career ==
In September 2017 Ghana Black Stars B coach James Kwesi Appiah handed him a late call up ahead of a 2018 African Nations Championship qualifier. In August 2019 Maxwell Konadu invited him to join the Ghana squad ahead of their preparation to face Burkina Faso in an African Nations Championship qualifier. Justice featured prominently for Ghana during the 2019 WAFU Cup of Nations tournament in Senegal.

== Personal life ==
In 2018 the midfielder reportedly converted to Islam after studying the religion for a while. He was previously a Christian.

== Honours ==
Asante Kotoko

- Ghana Premier League – 2019
- Play of the Month Award – January 2020

Ghana

- 2019 WAFU Cup of Nations – 2019, runners up medal.
