= Ibrahim Imoro =

Ghanaian footballer (born 1999)

Personal information
- Full name: Ibrahim Imoro
- Date of birth: 2 October 1999 (age 27)
- Position: Left-back

Senior career*
Years	Team	Apps	(Gls)
2016	Windy Professionals		
2016–2019	Bolga All Stars	23	(1)
2018–2019	→Karela United (loan)	13	(2)
2019	Thunder FC	0	(0)
2019–2022	Asante Kotoko	70	(5)
2022–2023	Al-Hilal Club	0	(0)
2024–	Singida Black Stars	24	(0)
2025–2026	→ Mtibwa Sugar (loan)	7	(0)

International career^{‡}
2021–	Ghana	5	(0)
- * Club domestic league appearances and goals ‡ National team caps and goals as of 20:54, 29 March 2021 (UTC)

Ibrahim Imoro (born 2 October 1999) is a Ghanaian professional footballer who plays as a left-back for Tanzanian Premier League club Singida Black Stars. He has also represented Ghana at senior international level.

Imoro began his career with Windy Professionals and later played for Bolga All Stars and Karela United before joining Asante Kotoko in December 2019. He became a regular for Kotoko and was part of the team that won the 2021–22 Ghana Premier League, making 28 league appearances during the title-winning season. After three seasons with Kotoko, he joined Sudanese club Al-Hilal Omdurman in August 2022, where he won the Sudan Cup. Following his departure from Al-Hilal, he moved to Tanzania to join Singida Black Stars in 2024 and later spent part of the 2025–26 season on loan at Mtibwa Sugar.

At international level, Imoro has represented Ghana's home-based national team, including at the 2019 WAFU Cup of Nations, where Ghana finished as runners-up. He made his senior international debut for Ghana in March 2021 in a 2021 Africa Cup of Nations qualifier against São Tomé and Príncipe. He later returned to the home-based national team, the Black Galaxies, and was appointed second vice-captain during Ghana's qualification campaign for the 2022 African Nations Championship.

== Career ==
=== Early career ===
Imoro began his career with Windy Professionals before joining Bolga All Stars ahead of the 2017 Ghana Premier League season. He made 23 league appearances and scored once during the campaign as Bolga All Stars were relegated from the Ghana Premier League. Despite the club's relegation, Imoro attracted attention for his performances during the season and was linked with a move to Asante Kotoko.

In 2018, Imoro joined newly promoted Ghana Premier League side Karela United on loan from Bolga All Stars. He made 13 league appearances and scored two goals during the season before the competition was suspended and subsequently abandoned. On 15 April 2018, he scored the winning goal as Karela recorded a 1–0 away victory over Wa All Stars, earning the man-of-the-match award.

After leaving Karela United, Imoro joined lower-division side Thunder FC. He subsequently travelled to Israel for a trial with Hapoel Tel Aviv, but did not sign for the club. He returned to Ghana and remained without a top-flight club until joining Asante Kotoko in December 2019.

=== Asante Kotoko ===
In December 2019, Imoro joined Asante Kotoko on a three-year contract ahead of the 2019–20 Ghana Premier League season. On 22 December 2019, he won his first trophy with the club, after Asante Kotoko defeated rivals Hearts of Oak 2–1 in the President's Cup. He made 11 league appearances and scored once during his first season with the club before the campaign was cancelled due to the COVID-19 pandemic.

During the 2020–21 season, Imoro established himself as a regular member of Kotoko's defence. He made 31 league appearances and scored two goals as Kotoko finished second in the Ghana Premier League. He also featured for the club in continental competition during the season, making appearances in both the CAF Champions League and CAF Confederation Cup.

Imoro played an important role in Kotoko's title-winning 2021–22 season. He made 28 league appearances, scored two goals and provided eight assists as Kotoko won the Ghana Premier League title. His performances during the campaign established him as one of the league's leading assist providers.

Following the conclusion of the season, Imoro left Kotoko after three seasons with the club. He finished his spell with 70 Ghana Premier League appearances and five goals. In August 2022, he completed a transfer to Sudanese club Al-Hilal Omdurman.

=== Al-Hilal Omdurman ===
In August 2022, Imoro joined Sudanese club Al-Hilal Omdurman from Asante Kotoko. The transfer reportedly involved an initial fee of US$150,000, with performance-related add-ons that could increase the total value of the deal. He completed his medical and joined the Sudanese champions ahead of the 2022–23 season.

On 24 October 2022, Imoro scored his first league goal for Al-Hilal, converting a free kick to equalise in a 2–1 victory over Al-Falah Atbara.

In November 2022, Imoro won his first trophy with Al-Hilal when the club defeated Al-Ahli Khartoum in the Sudan Cup final. He started the match and played the full game, which ended goalless before Al-Hilal won 4–2 on penalties.

Imoro also featured for Al-Hilal in the 2022–23 CAF Champions League. He played during the group stage as the club competed against Mamelodi Sundowns, Al Ahly and Coton Sport. Al-Hilal narrowly missed qualification for the quarter-finals, finishing third in their group.

His time in Sudan was subsequently disrupted by the outbreak of the war in Sudan in April 2023, which led to the suspension of domestic football. Imoro later ended his association with Al-Hilal and returned to Ghana.

=== Singida Black Stars ===
On 1 July 2024, Imoro joined Tanzanian Premier League club Singida Black Stars following his departure from Al-Hilal Omdurman. He featured for the club during the 2024–25 season.

In September 2025, Imoro joined Mtibwa Sugar on loan from Singida Black Stars for the 2025–26 season. He made seven league appearances during his time with Mtibwa Sugar and registered two assists.

Imoro returned to Singida Black Stars during the January 2026 transfer window. His performances during his loan spell were cited as a factor in the club's decision to recall him. On 11 February, he provided the assist for Linda Mtange's winning goal in a 1–0 league victory over Fountain Gate.

He subsequently established himself in the Singida side during the second half of the season, contributing both goals and assists in the Tanzanian Premier League.

== International career ==
Imoro has represented Ghana at both full international and home-based national-team level. He was involved with the Ghana home-based national team during the African Nations Championship qualifying campaigns, including the qualifiers for the 2018 and 2020 editions.

In February 2021, Imoro was among 32 home-based players invited by Charles Akonnor to train with the Ghana senior national team ahead of the final 2021 Africa Cup of Nations qualification matches. He made his senior international debut on 28 March 2021, coming on as a substitute for Baba Rahman in the 70th minute of Ghana's 3–1 victory over São Tomé and Príncipe at the Accra Sports Stadium.

In 2022, Imoro returned to the home-based national team, known as the Black Galaxies, ahead of qualification for the 2022 African Nations Championship. He was appointed second vice-captain of the team, behind captain Gladson Awako and first vice-captain Vincent Atingah.

Imoro started in Ghana's 3–0 victory over Benin in the first leg of their CHAN qualifying tie in July 2022. He also featured in the return leg as Ghana completed a 4–0 aggregate victory to advance to the final round of qualification.

Ghana subsequently defeated Nigeria over two legs to qualify for the African Nations Championship for the first time since 2014. Imoro, however, had moved from Asante Kotoko to Sudanese club Al-Hilal by the time of the tournament and was therefore no longer eligible to represent the home-based national team.

== Honours ==
Asante Kotoko

- Ghana Premier League: 2021–22
- President's Cup: 2019

Al-Hilal

- Sudan Cup: 2021–22

Ghana

- WAFU Cup of Nations runner-up: 2019

Individual

- Ghana Premier League Top Assist Provider: 2021–22
