= Richard Boadu =

Ghanaian professional footballer (born 1998)

Personal information
- Full name: Richard Boadu
- Date of birth: 4 April 1998 (age 28)
- Position: Midfielder

Team information
- Current team: Al-Ahly Benghazi

Senior career*
Years	Team	Apps	(Gls)
2018–2021	Medeama	43	(1)
2021–2023	Asante Kotoko	60	(2)
2023–	Al-Ahly Benghazi	0	(0)
- * Club domestic league appearances and goals

Richard Boadu (born 4 April 1998) is a Ghanaian professional footballer who plays as midfielder for Libyan club Al-Ahly Benghazi.

== Career ==
=== Early career ===
Boadu was born and bred in Kumasi. He started his career with Cornerstones a lower-tier side based in Kumasi. He played for lower-tier side Phar Rangers before securing a deal to Medeama in 2018. Prior to that move, he was linked with a move to then Wa All Stars in 2016.

=== Medeama ===
In February 2018, Boadu signed for Tarkwa-based side Medeama on a long-term deal. On 28 February 2018, he was unveiled along with ten other players including Ebenezer Ackahbi, Bright Enchil and Ali Ouattara as the new signings for the club ahead of the 2018 Ghana Premier League. He made his debut on 17 March 2018, playing 90 minute in a 1–0 victory over Karela United. He made 5 league appearances that season, before the league was suspended due to the dissolution of the Ghana Football Association (GFA) in June 2018, as a result of the Anas Number 12 Expose.

During the 2019–20 Ghana Premier League season, Boadu played in 14 league matches before the league was cancelled as a result of the COVID-19 pandemic. In March 2020, he signed a new 4-year contract with the club with the contract set to expire in 2024, with an option to extend for a further year. In July 2020, he revealed his interest in wanting to play for Ghanaian giants Kumasi Asante Kotoko. Asante Kotoko later wrote to Medeama in September 2020, to enquire about his availability and started negotiations in trying to sign him. The deal however did not take place and he was named on the Medeama squad list for the 2020–21 Ghana Premier League season.

=== Al-Ahly Benghazi ===
On 28 July 2023, Asante Kotoko announced the transfer of Boadu to Libyan club Al-Ahly Benghazi on a permanent deal subject to medicals. A week later, Al-Ahly officially announced the signing of Boadu on ahead of the 2023–24 season. He joined his teammates immediately for pre-season.
