= Asante Agyemang =

Ghanaian association football player

Personal information
- Full name: Asante Agyemang
- Date of birth: 1 June 1993 (age 33)
- Place of birth: Accra, Ghana
- Height: 1.79 m (5 ft 10 in)
- Position: Defender

Team information
- Current team: Għajnsielem
- Number: 5

Youth career
- 2010-2015: Young Goldfields

Senior career*
Years	Team	Apps	(Gls)
2016–2018	Bechem United	51	(1)
2019	Mufulira Wanderers	10	(1)
2019–present	Għajnsielem	28	(5)
- * Club domestic league appearances and goals as of 21:41, 1 December 2020 (UTC)

Asante Agyemang (born June 1, 1993) is a Ghanaian professional footballer who plays as defender for Maltese football club Għajnsielem.

== Club career ==
=== Early career ===
Born in Accra, Asante Agyemang began his youth career with Young Goldfields FC in Sunyani, Ghana.

=== Bechem United ===
On 1 January 2016, Agyemang left Young Goldfields FC to sign for Ghana Premier League club Bechem United. He served as the captain of the Ghanaian football club.

=== Mufulira Wanderers F.C. ===
On 18 May 2019, it was announced Agyemang had signed for Zambian Premier League club Mufulira Wanderers after a successful over five-year stint with Bechem United.

=== Ghajnsielem ===
In October 2019, Agyemang signed a two-year contract with Maltese club Għajnsielem as a free agent.

== Honour ==
=== Club ===
Bechem United

- 2016- Ghanaian FA Cup
