= Comfort Ocran =

Ghanaian motivational speaker and author

- Born: Comfort Ocran
- Education: University of Ghana (MA)
- Occupation: Motivational speaker

Comfort Ocran is a Ghanaian motivational speaker and author. She is the CEO of Legacy & Legacy (a management consultancy company) and executive director of Springboard Roadshow Foundation (a youth development and mentoring platform). She is also the co-founder of Combert Impressions.

== Education ==
Comfort holds a master's degree in Linguistics from the University of Ghana.

== Career ==
Comfort and her husband have authored 20 books including The Lord, Madiba and the Eagle and Speak Like a Pro. She runs an annual motivational and career guidance tour around Ghana called SpringBoard Road Show. It serves as a platform for the nation's leading public and private sector leaders to interact and inspire the up and coming youth. She is also the executive producer of Springboard, Your Virtual University which runs weekly on Joy 99.7 FM.

== Awards and recognition ==
Comfort is a fellow of the Aspen Institute and the Africa Leadership Initiative. She is also a fellow of International Visitor's Leadership Program. She, in conjunction with her husband, Albert, were given the Excellence Leadership Award for youth development. She was voted one of Ghana's most influential personalities for 2014.

== Personal life ==
She is married to Albert Ocran, an international motivational speaker. She has three children, Joojo, Naana and Nhyira.
