= A. K. Ocran =

Ghanaian military personnel

- Military career
- Allegiance: Ghana
- Branch: Army
- Rank: Chief of Army Staff of the Ghana Army

Brigadier A. K. Ocran was a Ghanaian military personnel and a former Chief of Army Staff of the Ghana Army. He served as Chief of Army Staff from February 1966 – August 1966.
