= Frimpong Manso =

Ghanaian football coach

Personal information
- Full name: Stephen Frimpong Manso
- Date of birth: 15 May 1959 (age 67)
- Place of birth: Ghana
- Position: Defender

Team information
- Current team: Bibiani Gold Stars (manager)

Senior career*
Years	Team	Apps	(Gls)
1983–1986	Cornerstones		
1991–1995	Asante Kotoko		

International career
1987–1994	Ghana	31	(2)

Managerial career
- 2008–2019: Ghana U17
- 2019: Nkoranza Warriors
- 2019–2020: Eleven Wonders
- 2020–2021: Nkoranza Warriors
- 2023: Bofoakwa Tano
- 2023–: Bibiani Gold Stars
- 2025–: Ghana U17
- * Club domestic league appearances and goals

Stephen Frimpong Manso (born 15 May 1959) is a Ghanaian football coach and former player who manages Bibiani Gold Stars and the Ghana U17 squad.

== Playing career ==
Manso played as a defender for Cornerstones and Asante Kotoko, as well as earning 14 caps for the Ghana national team.

== Coaching career ==
In 2017, he assisted the interim coach Godwin Ablordey in the management of Asante Kotoko. Later in March 2019 he became the manager of Nkoranza Warriors.

By December 2019, he moved to Techiman Eleven Wonders, but later returned in February 2020 to Nkoranza Warriors.

In July 2023, he was appointed as the head coach of newly promoted club Bofoakwa Tano. In November 2023, Manso mutually parted ways with |Bofoakwa Tano. In December 2024, he became head coach of Bibiani Gold Stars.

In January 2025, Manso was once again appointed manager of the Ghana U17 squad.
