= Telat Üzüm =

Turkish footballer and manager

Personal information
- Date of birth: 12 February 1963 (age 63)
- Place of birth: Istanbul, Turkey
- Height: 1.80 m (5 ft 11 in)
- Position: Midfielder

Team information
- Current team: Real Tamale United

Senior career*
Years	Team	Apps	(Gls)
1981–1983	1. FC Köln		
1983–1984	Karlsruher SC	8	(0)
- Fenerbahçe SK
- Karşıyaka SK

Managerial career
- 1994–1996: Beşiktaş JK (Assistant manager)
- 1997–1998: TSF Ditzingen (Assistant manager)
- 2005–2006: Bani Yas Club
- 2006–2007: Asante Kotoko
- 2009–2010: Sivasspor (Assistant manager)
- 2010–2011: Real Tamale United
- * Club domestic league appearances and goals

Telat Üzüm (born 12 February 1963) is a Turkish football manager and former player.

As a player, he played for clubs like 1. FC Köln, Karlsruher SC and Fenerbahçe SK.

As a coach, he was an assistant coach at Beşiktaş J.K. and Bayer Leverkusen. He also coached youth clubs in Germany, later on he worked as a head coach for Bani Yas Club in the United Arab Emirates. In 2007, Üzüm was fired from his position as Asante Kotoko manager.
