= Felix Annan =

Ghanaian footballer

Personal information
- Date of birth: 22 November 1994 (age 31)
- Place of birth: Ghana
- Height: 1.76 m (5 ft 9 in)
- Position: Goalkeeper

Youth career
- Gomoa Fetteh Feyenoord Academy

Senior career*
Years	Team	Apps	(Gls)
2011–2021	Asante Kotoko	70	(0)
2014	→ Real Tamale United (loan)		
2015	→ WAFA (loan)		
2022	Maryland Bobcats	20	(0)
2023	Carlton Town	33	(0)

International career^{‡}
2019–	Ghana	3	(0)
- * Club domestic league appearances and goals as of 1 July 2024 ‡ National team caps and goals as of 18:00, 15 July 2020 (UTC)

Felix Annan (born 22 November 1994) is a Ghanaian professional footballer who last played as a goalkeeper for Carlton Town and Ghana.

== Club career ==
Annan began his career at Gomoa Fetteh Feyenoord Academy, before signing for Asante Kotoko. In 2014, Annan was loaned to Real Tamale United, going out on loan again to the West African Football Academy in 2015.

He joined English lower-league side Carlton Town before the 2023–24 season.

== International career ==
On 9 June 2019, Annan made his debut for Ghana in a 1–0 friendly defeat against Namibia.
