= Richard Ocran =

Ghanaian footballer

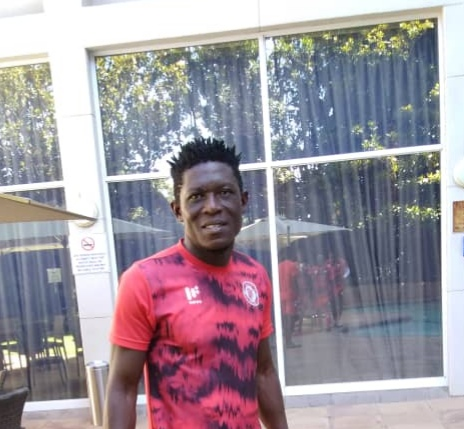

Personal information
- Full name: Richard Ocran
- Date of birth: 26 October 1993 (age 33)
- Place of birth: Accra, Ghana
- Height: 1.80 m (5 ft 11 in)
- Position: Defender

Team information
- Current team: Nkana
- Number: 13

Senior career*
Years	Team	Apps	(Gls)
=2012-2013	Real Tamale United	12	(4)
2013–2015	Amidaus Professionals F.C.	9	(0)
2015–2017	Dreams F.C.	19	(0)
2017	Ashanti Gold S.C.	8	(3)
2018-	Nkana	14	(2)
- * Club domestic league appearances and goals as of 23 June 2019

Richard Ocran (born 26 October 1993) is a Ghanaian defender who plays for Zambian Premier League club Nkana.

== Career ==
Ocran started his soccer career at Real Tamale United before moving to Amidaus Professionals F.C. After featuring for Amidaus, Ocran moved on to play for Dreams F.C. In January 2017, Ocran joined Ghana Premier Division club Ashanti Gold S.C.

== Nkana ==
In January 2018, Ocran signed with Zambian Premier League club Nkana following the termination of his contract at AsantiGold SC.
