= Mas-Ud Didi Dramani =

Ghanaian footballer & manager (born 1966)

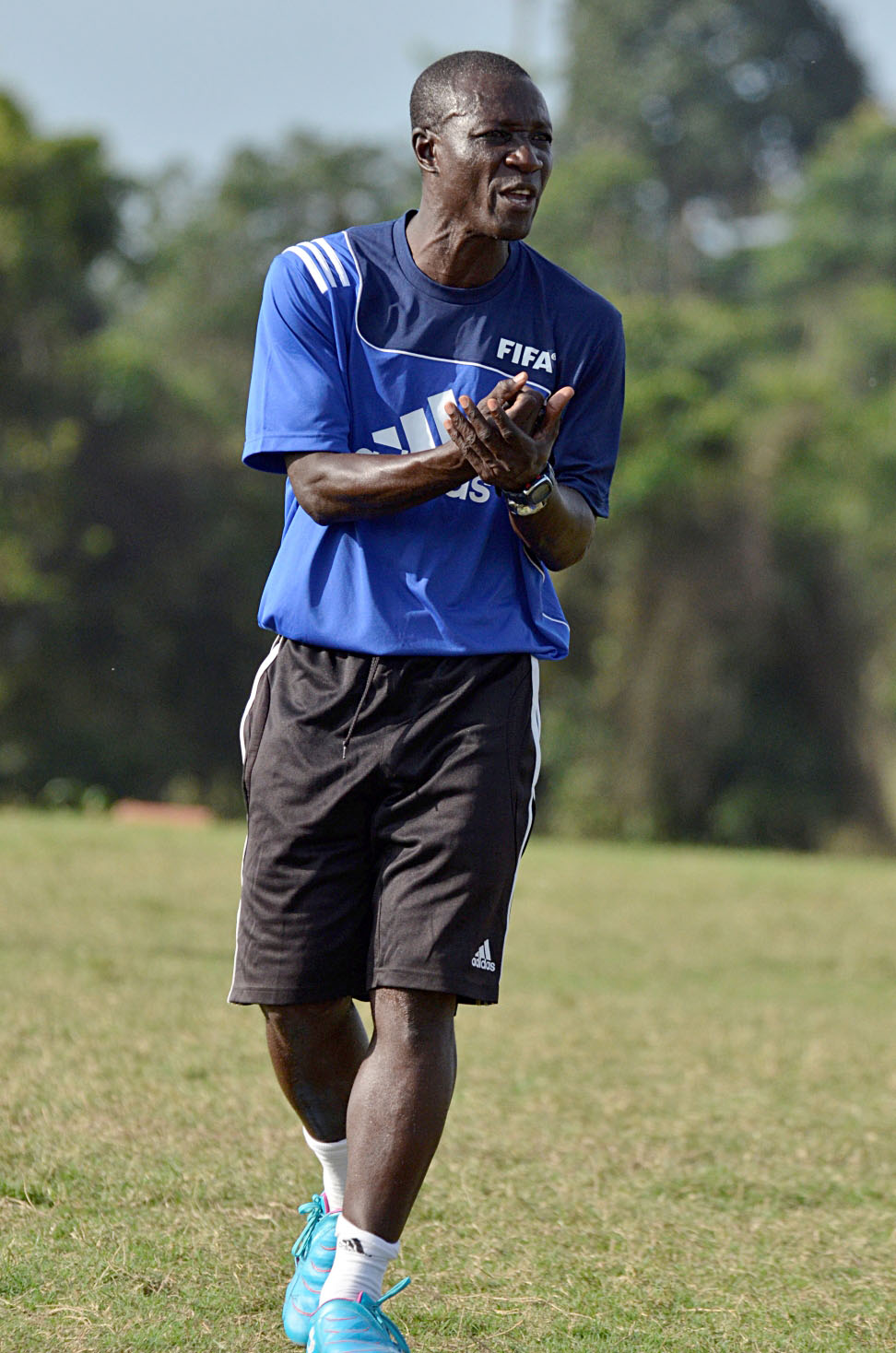
- Didi at training

Personal information
- Full name: Mas-Ud Didi Dramani
- Date of birth: 3 March 1966 (age 60)
- Place of birth: Tamale, Northern, Ghana
- Height: 1.68 m (5 ft 6 in)
- Position: Defender

Team information
- Current team: Ghana (Assistant coach)

Youth career
- Bolga Soccer Masters
- Hearts Babies

Senior career*
Years	Team	Apps	(Gls)
1985–1993	Real Tamale United		
1993–1998	Cape Coast Ebusua Dwarfs		
1998–2000	Real Tamale United		

Managerial career
- 2004–2009: Guan
- 2010–2012: Right To Dream Academy
- 2009–2011: Ghana Women (Assistant coach)
- 2011–2012: Ghana Women U17
- 2012–2015: Asante Kotoko
- 2017–2018: Ghana Women (Assistant coach)
- 2018–2019: FC Nordsjælland
- 2022: Ghana (interim Assistant coach)
- 2022–: Ghana (Assistant coach)
- * Club domestic league appearances and goals

Mas-Ud Didi Dramani (born 3 March 1966) is a football coach and a retired Ghana international football player. He is the Head coach of the Asante Kotoko. Didi is also a senior Confederation of African Football (CAF) instructor and assessor of coaches. He is also the formal Head coach of the Ghana National under 17 team where he qualify for the FIFA U-17 Women's World Cup in Azerbaijan and won a bronze medal.

== Playing career ==
Didi began his youth career with Bolga Soccer Masters at Bolgatanga in the Upper East region of Ghana. He then continued at Tamale Hearts Babies in the Northern region of Ghana. Didi began his professional career with the Real Tamale United (RTU), and later became the captain of the club. He then proceeded to Cape Coast Abusua Dwarf for a short while and returned to his beloved club RTU in 1998 and retired from active football in 2000.

== Coaching career ==
After his playing career, Didi left for the University of Education in Winneba in Ghana to study Physical Education (PE) with Football Coaching as his major. He returned to Kumbugun Senior High School in Tamale to become a PE teacher.

=== Early career ===
Whilst teaching he Founded Guan United and became the Head coach for a Division 2 side. Under him the club qualified for the National Division 1 league and qualified 3 times for the Division 1 league play-off (Middle league) three times. Didi was appointed as the assistant coach of Ghana's Women Nation team, the Black Queen in 2009 to 2011. whilst with the queens he worked also for Right to Dream Academy Akosombo in the Eastern Region of Ghana 2010-2012 as a Coach Educator.

=== Ghana Women's U17 ===
Dramani left the academy when he was appointed as the Head coach of the Ghana's Women U-17 Nation team, the Black maiden in 2012. He led them to qualify for the FIFA U-17 Women's World Cup in Azerbaijan for the 2012 FIFA U-17 Women's World Cup where the team become the first African team to win a medal. The Black Maidens defeated Germany in the third place match to win the bronze medal. He won the SWAG coach of the year in 2012 following his exploits.

=== Asante Kotoko ===
In August 2012 Didi signed for Asante Kotoko. Didi is a 2013-2014 first Capital Plus Premier League coach of the year after aiding Asante Kotoko win the League title for the Second consecutive season. This was his first League trophy with Asante Kotoko. Didi again is the winner of the 2014 MTN FA cup coach of the year award.

On 10 March 2015, Asante Kotoko announced that they had parted ways with Dramani reaching an agreement over his severance package. This happened after supervising seven matches in the 2015 season, losing three of those whilst accumulating 8 points from a possible 21 points leaving the club in the 10th position of the league table. In his three year tenure he won the two Ghana Premier League titles, one FA Cup and two Ghana Super Cup titles, with his most memorable season being the 2013–14 season, where he led the club to a domestic double, whilst also being declared as the Super Cup champions.

=== Nordsjælland ===
In 2017, Dramani was appointed as the assistant coach for the Ghana Women's National Team. Dramani later on left in 2019 to join Danish club FC Nordsjælland.

== Certification ==
Didi Started his coaching Certification in 2002 with the Ghana Football Association (GFA) Basic coaching certificate and followed it with the Confederation of African Football (CAF) Intermediate Coaching Certificate and the CAF High Level Coaching Certificate in 2003 and 2005 respectively. He continued to do his CAF License 'C' in 2007. Didi then participated in the 31st and 32nd International DFB (German Football Association) coaching courses in Hennef, Germany, and received the International DFB Coaching Certificates "B" and "A" in 2008 and 2009 respectively. He continued to do his CAF License 'B' and 'A' Certifications in 2009 and 2012 respectively in Ghana. Whilst Didi was pursuing his certification as a coach he was also striving to become a coaches instructor. He attained his CAF Regional Coaches Instructor's Certificate in 2011, Full Instructor's certificate in 2012 and he has become a CAF Senior Coaches Instructor and Assessor, a certificate he attained in 2013.

== Honours ==
Ghana Women U17

- FIFA U-17 Women's World Cup third place: 2012

Asante Kotoko

- Ghana Premier League: 2012–13 2013–14
- Ghanaian FA Cup: 2013–14
- Ghana Super Cup: 2013, 2014

Individual

- Ghana Premier League Coach of the Year: 2013–14
- Ghanaian FA Cup Coach of the Year: 2014
- SWAG Coach of the Year: 2012
