= Bibiani Gold Stars F.C. =

Bibiani GoldStars SC
- Full name: Bibiani GoldStars SC
- Nicknames: The Golden Boys; Gye Nyame (Except the Lord)
- Founded: 1998
- Ground: Dun's Park
- Capacity: 7,000
- Owner: Mensin Gold Mines Bibiani
- Chairman: Kwasi Adu
- Manager: Frimpong Manso
- League: Ghana Premier League
- 2025–2026: 2nd
Home colours	Away colours	Third colours

Bibiani GoldStars SC, formerly the Complex Stars and often shortened to and more commonly known as the Gold Stars, is a Ghanaian professional football team based in the Western North Region. It was founded in 1998 and later given to the Bibiani Gold Mines. They played in the 2A Zone of the Division One League. Zone 2A has seven competing teams from the part of the Ashanti Region, Western Region and the Central Region of Ghana.

They achieved promotion to the Ghana Premier League in 2021.

Bibiani GoldStars won their maiden Ghana Premier League title in June 2025 in dramatic style.

== Managerial history ==
- Agyemang Duah (2013)
- Kobina Amissah (2020–21)
- Michael Osei (2021–2023)
- Frimpong Manso (2023–)

== Honours ==
Ghana Premier League:

- Winners: 2024–25
