= Ocran, Virginia =

Unincorporated community in Virginia, United States

- Unincorporated community
- Location in Virginia Location in the United States
- Coordinates: 37°39′37″N 76°20′57″W
- Country: United States
- State: Virginia
- County: Lancaster
- Time zone: UTC−5 (Eastern (EST))
  - Summer (DST): UTC−4 (EDT)

Ocran is an unincorporated community in Lancaster County in the U. S. state of Virginia.
