= Kobina Amissah =

Ghanaian football manager

Kobina Amissah (born 21 July 1973) is a Ghanaian football manager who currently coaches Bibiani Gold Stars. He previously coached Elmina Sharks, Sekondi Hasaacas and Berekum Chelsea.

== Career ==
He served as head coach for Elimina Sharks in their inaugural Ghana Premier League season, the 2017 Ghanaian Premier League.

In July 2021, Amissah led Bibiani Gold Stars to the Ghana Premier League after winning the Ghana Division One League Zone Two with 62 points and two games to spare.
