= Sekondi Hasaacas F.C. =

Sekondi Hasaacas FC
- Full name: Sekondi Hasaacas Football Club
- Nicknames: Hasmal; Do The Do; Giant of the west
- Founded: 1931; 95 years ago
- Ground: Sekondi-Takoradi Stadium; Sekondi-Takoradi
- Capacity: 20,000
- Chairman: Samuel Arbuah
- Manager: Benjamin Hayford
- League: Division One League
Home colours	Away colours

Sekondi Hasaacas FC is a Ghanaian professional association football club based in Sekondi-Takoradi. The club won the Ghana Premier League in 1977 and is currently participating in the Division One League following relegation from the 2015-16 Ghana Premier League.

The side is the most followed football club in the Western Region, a region with a population of almost four million, and is nicknamed Hasmal, which comes with the response 'We Go Doo'. The support base of the club is referred to as Council and is the only club that has found its own way of celebrating when a goal is scored by replacing the popular shout of gooal with Dooo.

== History ==
The club was formed in 1931 and was previously a member of the Ghana Telecom Premier League. After twenty years in the Globacom Premier League, the club was relegated to the Poly Tank Division One League in 2010.

Affectionately referred to as the 'Giants of the West', an accolade it acquired after being the only Ghanaian team to hold Fortuna Düsseldorf to a 3–3 draw during a tour of West Africa by the German side in August 1959. The team had been the Oil City's only participant in the top flight Ghanaian Premiership for over a decade from the mid 1996–97 football season until its relegation to Division One in the 2009–2010 league season.

The club, Sekondi Hasaacas, has a rich history, producing four captains for the senior national team (the Black Stars) and contributing as many as five players to the squad that won the 1982 African Cup of Nations in Tripoli, Libya.

Sekondi Hasaacas FC is supported by a fan group known as the Councils, which has a significant presence across the region and follows the club at all levels of competition. The club is considered a mid-profile team but has a reputation for defeating higher-profile opponents. As a result, it has attracted supporters and sympathizers throughout the country, with some fans adopting it as their second club.

=== Early years ===
The foundation of Sekondi Hasaacas Football was due to six railway workers. The name Hasaacas came from the railway workers in Sekondi-Takoradi who decided to use the first letters of their names to form the name of the club in 1931, thus H.A.S.A.A.C.A.S.—namely Hammond, Amua Sakyi, Adotei, Allotey, Cann, Adotey and Sackey.

Most of them were supporters of Accra Hearts of Oak but migrated to Sekondi-Takoradi mainly because of their railway work. Amoah Sakyi was a High Court judge and was named as the club board secretary. Cann was also a lawyer by profession.

The name later became Sekondi Hasaacas because the team was based in Sekondi; they decided to use rainbow colors as their original colors because most of the founding members were supporters of Accra Hearts of Oak. After some years, they decided to change the colors because they clashed with the jerseys of Accra Hearts of Oak, who first started using rainbow colors. Hasaacas then decided to use white, green and red as its new colors.

=== Sekondi Hasaacas brand ===
Sekondi Hasaacas Football Club in June 2003 added to its file an academy and, for the first time in history, a ladies' team, the Hasaacas Ladies Football Club.

The academy was divided by age into division for under-12, -14 and -17 years, to help nurture young talents.

Later in 2009, the talented group of under-17 players was promoted to the Malavands Football Club, the reserve side of the mainstream Hasaacas Football Club to participate in the Division Three League.

The Malavands team qualified that same year to play in the Division Two league for the 2010 season, and have proved to be formidable in the 2nd division.

Thus, HASMAL represents the total Secondi Hasaacas family, the mainstream team, the ladies' team, Malavands and the Hasaacas Academy.

Daniel Egyin served as club captain in the 2016 Ghanaian Premier League season.

== Emblem ==
The bright green, white and red flag of the club and the ball-headed giant logo appeal to the bands of fans and supporters of the club.

== Honours ==
=== National titles ===
- Ghana Premier League: 1
  - 1977
- FA Cup: 1
  - 1985
- Ghana Super Cup: 1
  - 1985

=== Other GFA titles ===
- SWAG Cup: 2
  - 1982–83, 1983–84
- Ghana Telecom Gala: 1
  - 1988

=== Continental titles ===
- WAFU Cup 1
  - Champion – 1981–82
  - Runners-up – 1982–83
- African Cup Winners Cup: 0
  - Runners-up – 1980–81

== Head coaches ==
- (Ghana) Herbert Addo (1982–1985)
- (Ghana) P.S.K. Paha (1985–1986)
- (Ghana) Emmanuel Quarshie (2001–2002)
- (Ghana) Kobina Amissah (2013 –2014)
- (Ghana) Benjamin Hayford (28 February 2020 – )
- (Ghana) Joseph Agyemang (23 August 2017 – )
- (Ghana) Yusif Basigi (1 November 2014 – 4 August 2016)

== Players ==
=== Current squad ===
As of 27 April 2018 Note: Flags indicate national team as defined under FIFA eligibility rules. Players may hold more than one non-FIFA nationality. Note: Flags indicate national team as defined under FIFA eligibility rules; some limited exceptions apply. Players may hold more than one non-FIFA nationality.

No.	Pos.	Nation	Player
1	GK	GHA	Ebenezer Jarkwei
25	DF	GHA	Nathaniel Eshun
3	DF	GHA	Sampson Eduku
4	DF	GHA	Theophilus Awortwe
5	DF	GHA	Abeiku Ainooson
6	DF	GHA	Thomas Aboagye
7	FW	GHA	Ackah Obed Asamoah
8	MF	GHA	Aggrey Edward Nana
9	FW	GHA	Samuel Afful
10	MF	GHA	Isaac Mensah
11	DF	GHA	Isaac Asare
12	MF	GHA	Ekow Eshun
13	FW	GHA	David Nyankum
14	DF	GHA	Patrick Eshun
15	MF	GHA	John Koomson

No.	Pos.	Nation	Player
16	GK	GHA	Brebo Anthony
17	FW	GHA	Ekow Annan George
18	MF	GHA	Sanah Ibrahim Mohammed
19	DF	GHA	William Enchil
39	DF	GHA	Justuce Torsutsey
21	MF	GHA	Edmund Ampofo
22	GK	GHA	Michael Kwofie
23	MF	GHA	Philip Flamini
24	MF	GHA	Albert Adjei
40	MF	GHA	Obed Kofi Sam
26	MF	GHA	Ishack Zakaria
27	DF	GHA	Ebenezer Boadi
28	FW	GHA	Emmanuel Ebahoah
29	MF	GHA	Seidu Kumordzie Gideon
33	DF	GHA	Daniel Egyin

== Notable players ==
- Daniel Egyin – served as club captain in 2016 Ghanaian Premier League season.
