= Bechem United F.C. =

Ghanaian association football club

Bechem United FC
- Full name: Bechem United Football Club
- Nickname: The Hunters
- Founded: 1966; 60 years ago
- Ground: Nana Gyeabour's Park; Bechem Park; Bechem, Ahafo Region
- Capacity: 5,000
- Manager: Kwaku Danso
- League: Premier League
- 2025–2026: 11th
- Website: bechemunitedfc.com
Home colours	Away colours

Bechem United Football Club (officially: Bechem United Football Club or the "Hunters") is a Ghanaian professional football club, based in Bechem in the Ahafo Region. They are competing in the Ghanaian Premier League.

== Club history ==
Bechem United has a long history of rivalry with Brong Ahafo (BA) Stars and Berekum Chelsea. In 2007, the youth team of Bechem United took part in the Trofeo Karol Wojtyla, a youth tournament in the Italian Commune of Fiumicino, Province of Rome, Lazio region.

In September 2011, Bechem United were crowned champions of the Poly Tank Division One League Zone 1 and promoted to the 2011–12 season of the Glo Premier League. On 10 October 2011, Eric Fordjour scored the club's first top flight goal after scoring penalty in their league opener against Aduana Stars, the match however ended in 3–2 loss.

On 5 November 2011, the club earned their first league point after 1–1 draw against Aduana Stars, Bechem's goal was scored by Richard Addae in the 18th minute of the match. Richard Addae ended their debut season as the club's top goal scorer and the league's third top goal scorer with 11 goals.

=== FA Cup Champions ===
Bechem United won the Ghanaian FA Cup 2015–2016 for the first time in the club History after they claimed a 2–1 win over Okwawu United at the Cape Coast Stadium in September 2016. Yaw Annor scored the brace in the final.

Daniel Egyin served as club captain from 2018 to 2019 after the departure of Asante Agyemang.

== Grounds ==
The club plays its home games in the BetPawa Ghana Premier League from the Nana Gyeabour's Park, located in their original home Bechem.

== Current squad ==
As of 14 October 2022

Note: Flags indicate national team as defined under FIFA eligibility rules; some limited exceptions apply. Players may hold more than one non-FIFA nationality.

No.	Pos.	Nation	Player
2	DF	GHA	Foster Appiah
3	DF	GHA	Francis Acquah
5	DF	GHA	Kofi Agbesimah
6	MF	GHA	Paul Kwei Jr
8	MF	GHA	Francis Twene
10	FW	GHA	Clinton Duodu
12	GK	GHA	Iddrisu Abdulai
14	DF	GHA	Aaron Essel
16	GK	GHA	Haruna Aziz Dari
18	MF	GHA	Abdul Karim
20	FW	GHA	Yaw Dasi Obuoba
22	MF	CMR	Gabriel Yapy Tenlep

No.	Pos.	Nation	Player
24	DF	GHA	Desmond Tawiah
26	MF	GHA	Caleb Asamoah
28	DF	GHA	Joseph Kinful
29	MF	GHA	Seth Kwadwo
30	MF	GHA	Abdul Latif Anabila
32	FW	GHA	Dennis Modzaka
40	FW	GHA	Peter Opoku
41	FW	GHA	Emmanuel Annor
45	MF	GHA	Isaac Afoakwa
48	FW	GHA	Samuel Amoto
50	FW	CMR	Junior Atemengue
88	FW	GHA	Hafiz Konkoni

== Management ==
Roles	Personnel
President	Kingsley Owusu-Achau
Chairman	Kingsley Osei Bonsu
Chief Executive Officer	Nana Akwesi Darlyn
Administrative Manager	Francis German Hackman
Director of Operations	Francis Addai
Team Manager	Emmanuel Amoako Gyampah
Public Relations Officer	Emmanuel Gyasi Atuahene

== Club captains ==
- Asante Agyemang (2017–2018)
- Daniel Egyin (2018–2019)
- Prince Asempa (2019–2020)
- Moro Salifu (2020–2021)

== Notable coaches ==
- Mohammed Adil Erradi (2015–2016)
- Romain Folz (2020)

== Honours ==
- FA Cup
  - Winners (1): 2016
- Ghana Super Cup:
  - Runners-up (1): 2017
- Poly Tank Division One League Zone 1
  - Champions (1): 2010–11
