= Asante Kotoko S.C. =

Association football club based in Kumasi

Asante Kotoko
- Full name: Asante Kotoko Sporting Club
- Nickname: Porcupine Warriors
- Founded: 31 August 1935; 91 years ago
- Ground: Baba Yara Sports Stadium; Kumasi, Ashanti, Ghana
- Capacity: 40,528
- Owner: Otumfuo Nana Osei Tutu II
- Chairman: James Osei Brown
- Manager: Eric Tinkler
- League: Ghana Premier League
- 2025–26: 8th of 18
- Website: scasantekotoko.com
Home colours	Away colours	Third colours

Asante Kotoko Sporting Club, simply known as Asante Kotoko, is a professional football club founded on 31 August 1935 and based in Kumasi in the Ashanti Region of Ghana. Nicknamed the Porcupine Warriors, they compete in the Ghana Premier League and play their home matches at the Baba Yara Stadium in Amakom, Kumasi.

They have won the league a record 24 times, the CAF Champions League twice, and were adjudged the African club of the century by the International Federation of Football History and Statistics (IFFHS).

== History ==
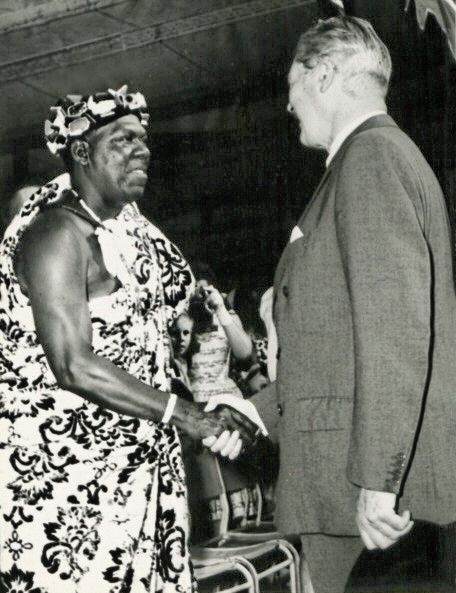
Asantehene King Prempeh II, is the first life patron of Asante Kotoko greeting Prime Minister of the United Kingdom Harold Macmillan, January 1960

=== Early years ===
The foundation of Kumasi Asante Kotoko Sporting Club was laid by 13 young Ashanti men led by a young driver, Mr. Kwasi Kumah, ably supported by L.Y. Asamoah, an electrician. Mr. Kwasi Kumah, a native of Nyankyerenease near Kumasi in the Ashanti Region, was a chauffeur to an English man and military officer, Colonel Ross. Kwasi Kumah nurtured the idea of forming a football team when he watched an exciting football match. When Colonel Ross returned home for good, Kumah bought a set of jerseys to start his football team. With cooperation from his good friend, L.Y. Asamoah, he formed the Ashanti United Football Club in 1926. Five years later, the team was renamed Kumasi Titanics. The team was really handicapped because most of the players worked in government organizations like the Prisons and Railways, and had been transferred from Kumasi. "Kumasi Titanics" did not find enough luck in their new name, and in 1934, they adopted a more powerful name, Mighty Atoms. Still, the club did not see much progress, and in 1935, Mr. J.S.K. Frimpong, popularly called Teacher Frimpong, then a teacher at the Kumasi Government School who had all the time shown interest in the club, organized some men from his school and proposed a change of name from "Kumasi Titanics" to Kumasi Asante Kotoko Football Club. Permission had to be obtained from the Asantehene (King of the Kingdom of Ashanti) because the name "Kotoko", meaning "Porcupine" is the official symbol of the Ashanti nation. The Asantehene, Nana Sir Osei Agyeman Prempeh II, became the first life patron of the club. Kumasi Asante Kotoko Football Club was subsequently formally founded in 1935.

Asante Kotoko's emblem features the "Porcupine," displaying an inbuilt arsenal of sharp spikes for use when attacked by an enemy.

=== Tragedy ===
The Accra Sport Stadium disaster occurred at the Ohene Djan Stadium, Accra, Ghana on 9 May 2001. Ghana's most successful football teams played that day: the Accra Hearts of Oak Sporting Club and the Asante Kotoko. Accra had two late goals, and a referee would call 2–1 Accra, resulting in Kotoko fans throwing plastic seats and bottles onto the pitch. The police responded by firing tear gas into the trapped crowd. Panic and a stampede ensued as fans tried to escape. After the hour-long ordeal, it was found that 117 deaths resulted from compressive asphyxia and 10 fans died from trauma.

In January 2020, the team was banned from the Baba Yara stadium temporarily after violent reactions by supporters led to a fan being hit by a rubber bullet fired by the police. The fans were seen in various videos throwing projectiles onto the pitch because they were dissatisfied with a refereeing decision. The incident happened in a match that they played against Berekum Chelsea. A GFA ruling fined the club 20,000 Ghana cedis, and the next three home games were played behind closed doors.

=== 2000s ===
In July 2011, Asante Kotoko and English Premier League club Sunderland signed a partnership agreement, which will see Sunderland offering practical support and advice in youth coaching, player development, fitness, and medical matters, as well as football business strategy, to Asante Kotoko. In January 2002, P V Obeng was appointed as the board chairman of the Board of Directors of the club.

== Colours ==
The colours of Asante Kotoko depict the colours on both the national flag (ethnic flag) and national emblem of Ashanti with the colours of red, yellow, and green used on the Asante Kotoko first (home) kit shirts and shorts while the colours white and red are used on the Asante Kotoko second alternative kit shirts and shorts; and in 2011, Asante Kotoko reintroduced the third alternative kit of black, yellow, and green colours worn in the late 1980s.

=== Kits evolution ===
1st Colours	2nd Colours	2nd Alt.	3rd Colours

== Emblem ==
The porcupine on the National Emblem of the Kingdom of Ashanti; The "Porcupine Warriors" is the Asante Kotoko nickname.

Asante Kotoko's emblem symbolizes the national emblem of the Kingdom of Ashanti (Kingdom of Asante) with the colours black, green and yellow enclosing the colours on the national flag and ethnic flag of the Kingdom of Asante and Asante Kotoko's emblem; the Asante Kotoko emblem features a remarkably threatening looking porcupine and the motto "Ashanti Twi: Kum apem a, apem beba", which means "If you kill a thousand, a thousand more will come".

== Ground ==
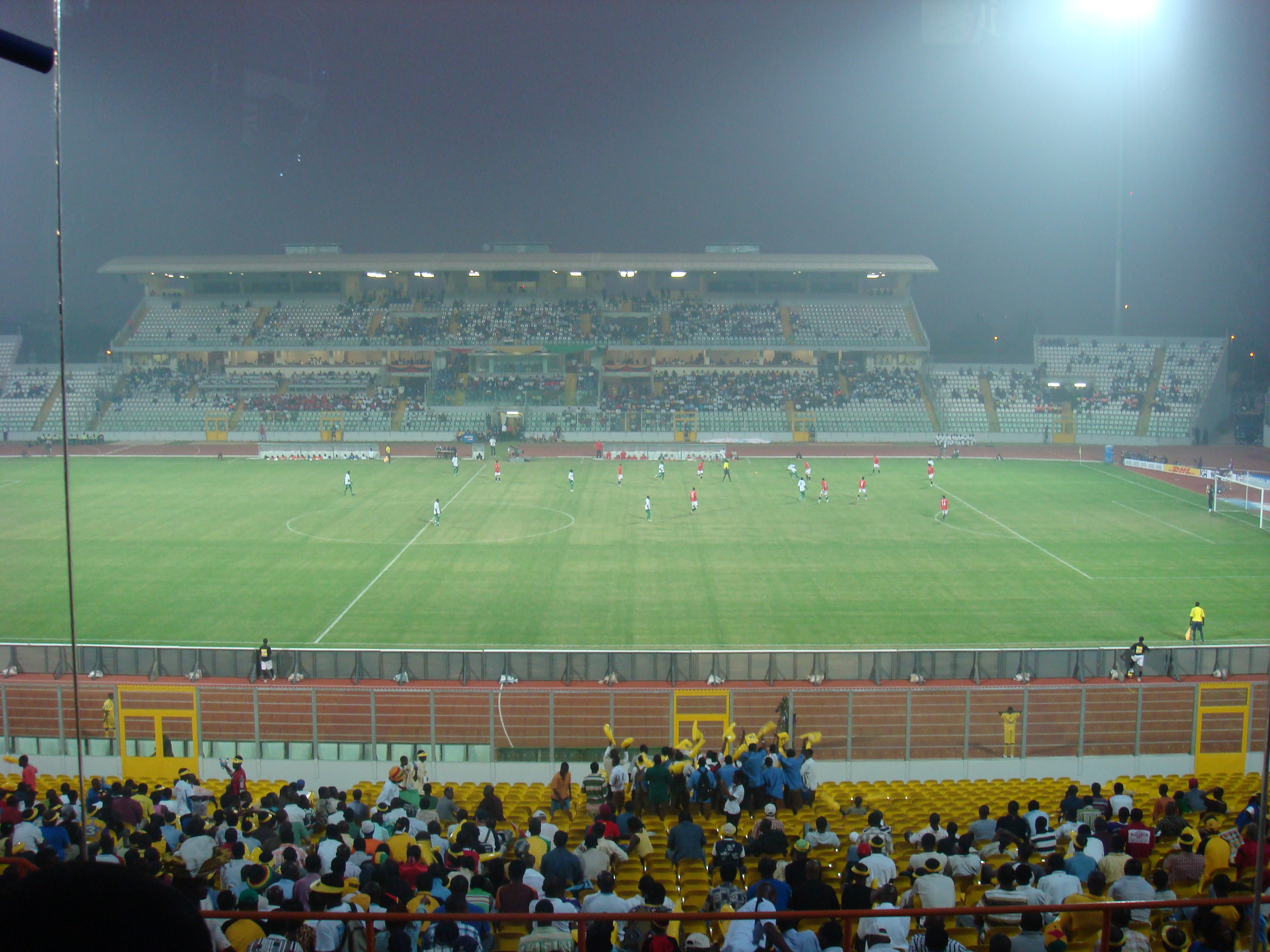
Kumasi Asante Kotoko SC home ground is the Baba Yara Stadium

Asante Kotoko's home stadium is the Baba Yara Stadium located in the capital city of Ashanti, Kumasi. With a 40,528 capacity, Baba Yara Stadium, which was built in 1957, is the largest stadium in Ghana. The stadium is named after a former Ghanaian footballer who played for Kotoko between 1955 and 1961. In 2010, it was reported that as part of an endorsement by Rlg Communications, Asante Kotoko will get a multi-purpose stadium called the Rlg Fabulous Arena.

== Support ==
Asante Kotoko is the 6th biggest football team and professional club in Continental Africa and arguably the biggest club in Ghana; Asante Kotoko has a speculated 10 million followers and in the year 2011, Asante Kotoko and Sunderland AFC respective club executive Chairmen's engaged in strategic and positive discussions on both clubs collaborating. The Asante Kotoko strategical partnership sees Sunderland of the Premier League sharing its coaching and business expertise with Asante Kotoko, offering practical support and advice in youth coaching, player development, fitness and medical matters and football business strategy. Kotoko in turn works closely with Sunderland AFC to help the Premier League club build and grow its brand in the emerging African territory and geographic Africa. In the 2021–22 season of the top-flight football league of Ghana, Asante Kotoko drew an average home attendance of 4,585. This average was limited because of measures.

== Ownership ==
=== Club financing and club endorsements ===
The owner and life patron of Asante Kotoko sports club is the Asantehene, King of the Asantes of Ghana, Osei Tutu II. The GH150 million per annum (per season) Asante Kotoko squad players salary wage bill for 2015 and further additional GH105 million per annum (per season) squad players transfer wage bill for 2015 is financed from the large and industrial mineral rich economy of Ashanti.

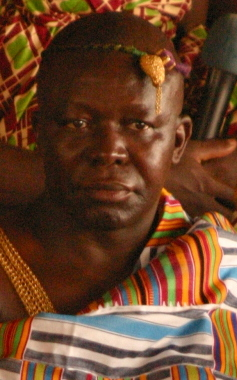
Asante Kotoko president and owner; King Asantehene of Ashanti, Osei Tutu II.

Ashanti is a top-10 producer of gold bars and gold bullions in the world as Ashanti is also a major site of the world's gold-mining industry with Ashanti being home to the world's 10th largest producing gold mine on Earth, the Obuasi Gold Mine.

Asante Kotoko's diverse endorsements portfolio includes technology corporations Interplast, Smart TV, Iei and giant Rlg Communications; financial institution Fidelity Bank; water company Everpure limited, Peppis Pizza limited, and Vit's Noodles limited; telecommunication companies Millicom and MTN Group; mass media company SportsPro Media limited; worldwide major electricity generation and electricity construction incorporation Symbion Power; and Singaporean kit manufacturer Kubba.

=== Partnerships ===
In November 2020 a partnership agreement was signed between the club and Hisense Ghana. This made Hisense, an electronics manufacturer, the club's official electronics partner from 2020 until 2023.

=== Sponsorship ===
Asante Kotoko Kit Manufacturers
Start	End	Name
2008	2011	Lotto
2011	2012	Erreà
2012	2014	Puma SE
2014	2018	(Singapore) Kubba
2019	2020	Strike
2020		Erreà

== Training facility ==
=== Asante Kotoko Adako-Jachie Training Complex ===
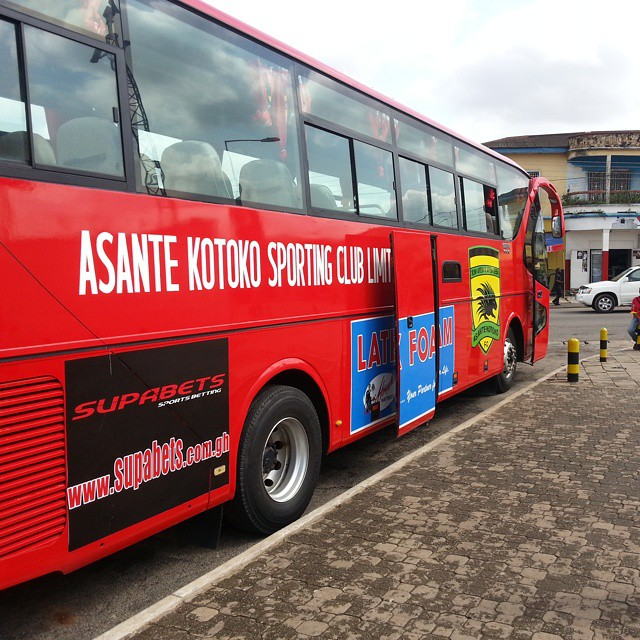
Ashanti's Kumasi Asante Kotoko Squad Coach (Bus).

Asante Kotoko training ground and training facilities headquarters, are located in the capital city of the Ashanti nation, Kumasi. There is ongoing construction of the "Asante Kotoko Adako-Jachie Training Complex" which when completed in 2015 will consist of three training pitches, one artificial grass pitch, multi-functional sports hall, Olympic-size swimming pool and a 20-bedroom camping facility for Asante Kotoko at Adako Jachie suburb situated on the outskirts of Kumasi. The "Asante Kotoko Adako-Jachie Training Complex"; three training pitches and the 20 bedroom facility will come with a large multi-operational health club and gym, weights for strength training and physical fitness area, a massage unit, dressing rooms, the technical staff's and coaches' office, as well as a conference room with screening facilities and offices for the Asante Kotoko Chief operating officers (Operations Director) and the technical bench.

Whereas one of the training pitches will go to the Asante Kotoko reserve and youth squad; the remaining two other training pitches will be used by the Asante Kotoko professional senior squad. The Asante Kotoko executive board committee revealed that 10 percent of contributions to the Asante Kotoko development project fund would be used to fund the "Asante Kotoko Adako-Jachie Training Complex" and mega training facility. The Asante Kotoko executive board intimated that the Asante Kotoko Owner and Life Patron of Asante Kotoko, Asantehene King Otumfuo Osei Tutu II of the Ashanti nation is to provide both financial and moral support to the "Asante Kotoko Adako-Jachie Training Complex" and mega training facility construction project. The Asante Kotoko squad players are driven from the Asante Kotoko stadium on the Asante Kotoko squad coach (bus) manufactured by Tata Motors of conglomerate Tata Group to the training headquarters of Asante Kotoko.

Situated at the headquarters of Asante Kotoko is also the Youth academy of Asante Kotoko, in which system and program focuses on the Asante Kotoko youth squad players development as footballers. Former products of the Asante Kotoko Youth academy development program and system include Karim Abdul Razak, Tony Yeboah, Isaac Vorsah, Samuel Inkoom, Godwin Antwi.

== Current squad ==
As of 2 October 2026

Note: Flags indicate national team as defined under FIFA eligibility rules; some limited exceptions apply. Players may hold more than one non-FIFA nationality.

No.	Pos.	Nation	Player
1	GK	GHA	Dari Aziz Haruna
2	DF	GHA	Shayibu Abubakari
4	DF	CIV	Koffi Bini
5	DF	GHA	Musa Hamzata
6	MF	GHA	Richard Boadu
7	MF	GHA	Philip Amoh
8	MF	GHA	Lord Hilary Adabo
9	FW	GUI	Morifing Donzo
10	MF	GHA	Hubert Gyau
11	FW	CIV	Eric Gbetta
12	DF	GHA	Emmanuel Sanja
13	MF	GHA	Walid Fuseini
14	FW	GHA	Isaac Opoku Agyemang
15	DF	COD	Aristote Tamuzi
16	DF	GHA	Yakubu Dogo

No.	Pos.	Nation	Player
17	DF	GHA	Patrick Asiedu
18	FW	GHA	Emmanuel Mamah
19	FW	GHA	Inusah Adam
20	MF	GHA	Seth Kwadwo
22	GK	MAR	Mourad Abdelwadie
24	DF	BFA	Tarnagda Abdoul Kader
25	MF	GHA	Andrews Ntim
26	DF	GHA	Joseph Amoah
27	DF	GHA	Lord Amoah
29	FW	GHA	Jordan Amissah
31	GK	GHA	Ibrahim Danlad
40	MF	GHA	Emmanuel Antwi
43	DF	GHA	Emmanuel Kotei
44	MF	GHA	Prince Badu

== Management ==
=== Technical Director ===
The Dutchman, Stanley Menzo is the technical director of the Asnate Kotoko S.C. He has been appointed to lead the technical director role for the club on a long term deal on 8th June, 2026. He has been without a job after leaving his coaching role in November 2025 at Suriname.

"I didn't see it coming myself," said Menzo. "Sometimes things come your way. You then get to work on that. This has happened. A new step. I have indicated that I am looking forward to an adventure again. Then you get some offers. This did not immediately come as an offer, but as a request. These clubs were looking for a coach. I wanted to talk about that. One thing led to another. It was not a coach, but a technical director. Director of football, as they call it here."

== Honours ==
=== Domestic ===
- Ghana Premier League: 24
  - 1959, 1963–64, 1964–65, 1967-68, 1969, 1972, 1975, 1980, 1981, 1982, 1983, 1986, 1987, 1988–89, 1990–91, 1991–92, 1992–93, 2003, 2005, 2007–08, 2011–12, 2012–13, 2013–14, 2021–22 (record)
- GFA Normalization Committee Special Competition: 1
  - 2019
- FA Cup: 10
  - 1958, 1960, 1976,1978, 1984, 1997–98, 2001, 2014, 2017, 2024-25
- Ghana Super Cup (Champion of Champions) : 5
  - 1977, 2012, 2013, 2014, 2025 (record)

=== Other GFA National Titles ===
- SWAG Cup: 15
  - 1981, 1986, 1988, 1989, 1990, 1991, 1992, 1993, 1998 (shared), 2000, 2001, 2003, 2005, 2008, 2015 (record)
- Ghana Telecom Gala: 3
  - 1999–2000, 2001, 2005 (record)
- Ghana Top Four Cup: 3
  - 2003, 2007 (record)
- President's Cup: 9
  - 1973, 1984, 2004, 2005, 2008, 2016, 2017, 2019, 2025 (record)
- GHALCA Special Cup: 3
- Ghana Top Eight Cup: 3
- Ghana Top Six Cup: 2
- Independence Cup: 3
- June 4 Cup: 1
- 31 December Revolution Cup: 2
- Democracy Cup: 2
  - 2024, 2026

=== Continental ===
- African Cup of Champions Clubs/CAF Champions League: 2
  - Champions: 1970, 1983

Contributor: Bright Yeboah Taylor (Ghanaian Sports Historian)(KUMASI)

Toyota Cup

• 2025 Winners

== Performance in CAF competitions ==
- CAF Champions League: 10 appearances

2004 – Third Round
2005 – First Round
2006 – Group Stage
2007 – Preliminary Round

2009 – First Round
2010 – Preliminary Round
2013 – First Round

2014 – Preliminary Round
2015 – First Round
2019–20 – First Round

- African Cup of Champions Clubs: 16 appearances

1966: Quarter-finals
1967: Finalist
1969: Semi-finals
1970: Champion
1971: Finalist
1973: Finalist

1976: Quarter-finals
1981: Second Round
1982: Finalist
1983: Champion
1984: First Round
1987: Semi-finals

1988: First Round
1990: Semi-final
1992: Quarter-finals
1993: Finalist

- CAF Confederation Cup: 6 appearances

1995 – Quarter-finals
1997 – Second Round
2004 – Finalist
2008 – Group Stage
2019 – Group Stage
2020 – Playoffs round

- 2CAF Cup Winners' Cup: 7 appearances

1979 – First Round
1985 – Quarter-Finals
1991 – First Round

1999 – Second Round
2002 – Finalist

2003 – Quarter-Finals
2005 – First Round

CAF Clubs Rankings: Current 21st Century Top 6 – CAF overall ranking of African Clubs
CAF	Football Team	Points
1	(Egypt) Al-Ahly	91
2	(Tunisia) Espérance	58
3	(Tunisia) Étoile du Sahel	54
4	(Egypt) Zamalek	50
5	(Democratic Republic of the Congo) TP Mazembe	49
6	(Ghana) Asante Kotoko	44

== Former footballers ==
For details on former Asante Kotoko SC footballers see Category:Asante Kotoko S.C. players.

== Club captains ==
- Ibrahim Sunday
- Malik Jabir
- James Kwesi Appiah
- Abdoulaye Soulama (2008–10)
- Jordan Opoku (2010–11)
- Amos Frimpong (2015–2019)
- Felix Annan (2019–2021)
- Ismail Abdul-Ganiyu (2021–2022)
- Richard Boadu (2022–2023)
- Ibrahim Danlad (2023 - 2024)
- Frederick Asare (2025 - 2025)

== Head coaches ==
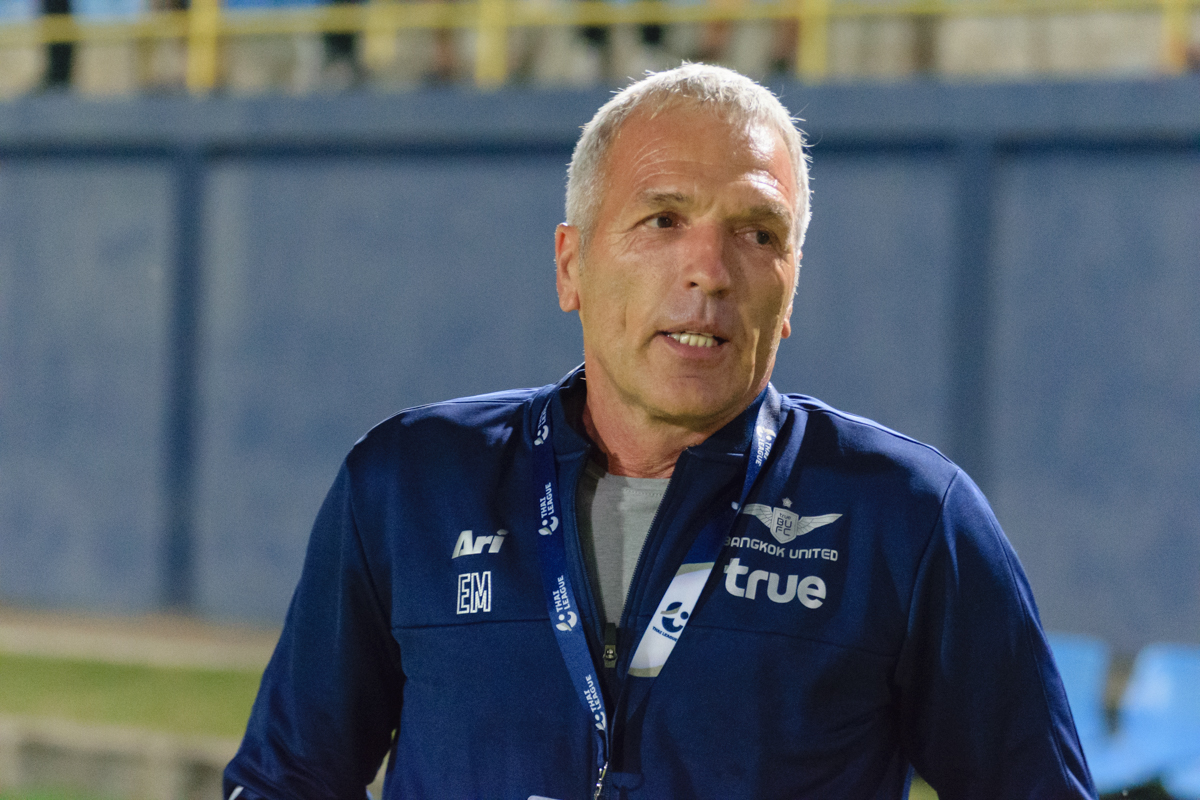
Ernst Middendorp became the manager of Asante Kotoko

- (Ghana) George Commey Mills-Odoi (1951–1952)
- (Hungary) Tamás Kertész (1971–1973)
- (Ghana) Ibrahim Sunday (1982)
- (Ghana) Malik Jabir (1993–1994)
- (Ghana) James Kwesi Appiah (1995–1996)
- (Germany) Ernst Middendorp (30 December 1999 – 30 June 2002)
- (Ghana) Karim Abdul Razak (2003–2004)
- (Ghana) Malik Jabir (2005–2006)
- (Turkey) Telat Üzüm (1 October 2006 – 31 March 2007)
- (Belgium) Maurice Cooreman (1 November 2008 – 10 February 2009)
- (Ghana) Herbert Addo (25 June 2009 – 1 April 2010)
- (Serbia) Bogdan Korak (5 November 2010 – 26 August 2011)
- (Ghana) Maxwell Konadu (2011–12)
- (Ghana) Mas-Ud Didi Dramani (2012–14)
- (Ghana) David Duncan (2014–16)
- (Ghana) Michael Osei (2016)
- (Croatia) Zdravko Logarušić(2017)
- (United Kingdom) Steven Polack (May, 2017)
- (Ghana) Paa Kwesi Fabin (2018)
- (Ghana) Charles Akonnor(1 Oct 2018 – July 2019)
- (Norway) Kjetil Zachariassen (July 2019 – December 2019)
- (Ghana) Maxwell Konadu ( December 2019 – December 2020)
- (Ghana) Abdul Gazale (February 2021 – March 2021) (Interim)
- (Portugal) Mariano Barreto(March 2021 – September 2021)
- (Ghana) Prosper Narteh Ogum(September 2021 – August 2022)
- (Burkina Faso) Seydou Zerbo (2022 - 2023)
- (Ghana) Prosper Narteh Ogum (2023 - 2025)
- 🇬🇭 Abdul-Karim Zito (2025–2026)
- (South Africa) Eric Tinkler (2026–present)

== Seasons ==
- 2020–21 Asante Kotoko S.C. season
- 2022–23 Asante Kotoko S.C. season

Achievements
Preceded by Ismaily SC (Egypt)	Champions of Africa; 1970–71	Succeeded by Canon Yaoundé (Cameroon)
Preceded by Al Ahly SC (Egypt)	Champions of Africa; 1983–84	Succeeded by Zamalek SC (Egypt)
Preceded by Kaizer Chiefs (South Africa)	African Cup Winners' Cup; Runner up: Asante Kotoko (Ghana); Winner: Wydad Casablanca (Morocco); 2002–03	Succeeded by Étoile Sportive du Sahel (Tunisia)
Preceded by	CAF Confederation Cup; Runner up: Asante Kotoko (Ghana); Winner: Hearts of Oak (Ghana); 2004–05	Succeeded by FAR Rabat (Morocco)
