= 2020–21 Dreams F.C. season =

Ghanaian football club season

Dreams F.C
- Chairman: Mohammed Jiji Alifoe
- Manager: Vladislav Virić
- Stadium: Theatre of Dreams, Dawu
- Premier League: 7th
- FA Cup: Knockout
- All statistics correct as of 11 August 2021.

The 2021–21 season of Ghanaian club Dreams F.C covered the period from 20 November 2020 to 8 August 2021.

== Season overview ==
Dreams F.C ended the 2020–21 season without a trophy after placing seventh in the domestic league and was knock out by Asante Kotoko in the FA Cup.

== Technical team ==
The technical team for the 2020–21 season was as follows:

Position	Name
Technical Director	(Ghana) Abdul-Karim Zito
Head coach	(Serbia) Vladislav Virić
Assistant Coach	(Ghana) Winfred Dormon
Team Manager	(Ghana) Gen. Kofi Akosa Agyei-Aygeman
Goal Keeper Coach	(Ghana) Raymond Faney
Physiotherapy	(Ghana) Jibril Uthman
Masseur	Haruna Seidu

== Squad ==
As of 18 February 2020

Note: Flags indicate national team as defined under FIFA eligibility rules; some limited exceptions apply. Players may hold more than one non-FIFA nationality.

No.	Pos.	Nation	Player
1	GK	GHA	Godfred Amoah
2	DF	GHA	Philomon Baffour
3	DF	GHA	Kingsley Owusu
4	DF	GHA	Yaw Dankwah
5	DF	GHA	Abdulai Massaudu
6	FW	GHA	Victor Oduro
7	FW	GHA	Emmanuel Ocran
8	MF	GHA	Farhadu Suleiman
9	FW	GHA	Abel Manomey
10	FW	GHA	Joseph Esso
11	FW	GHA	Agyenim Boateng Mensah
12	FW	GHA	Ibrahim Issah
13	MF	GHA	Dantani Amadu
14	DF	GHA	Abdulai Ibrahim
15	MF	GHA	Michael Agbekpornu (captain)
16	GK	GHA	Solomon Agbesi

No.	Pos.	Nation	Player
17	FW	GHA	Ali Huzaif
18	GK	GHA	Peter Sarkodie
19	MF	GHA	Clement Abdul Latif
20	MF	GHA	Abdul Nasir Saeed
21	DF	GHA	Abdul Jalilu (vice-captain)
22	MF	GHA	Mohammed Sulemana
23	DF	GHA	Maxwell Arthur
24	DF	GHA	Robert Bivalin Ntsango
25	FW	GHA	Percious Boah
26	FW	GHA	Solomon Twene
28	DF	GHA	Issah Yakubu
28	MF	GHA	Charles Lucio Osei (vice-captain)
29	FW	GHA	Kwame Otu
30	MF	GHA	Mohammed Baki
—	GK	GHA	Philemon McCarthy

== Competitions ==
=== Premier League ===
==== League table ====
Pos	Team	Pld	W	D	L	GF	GA	GD	Pts
5	Medeama	34	15	9	10	38	34	+4	54
6	Great Olympics	34	15	7	12	37	33	+4	52
7	Dreams	34	13	10	11	45	35	+10	49
8	Karela United	34	12	10	12	42	41	+1	46
9	Ashanti Gold	34	11	12	11	50	36	+14	45

Updated to match(es) played on 18 July 2021. Source: type=Goal.com
