= 2022–23 Ghana Premier League =

Association football league in Ghana

Ghana Premier League
- Season: 2022–23
- Dates: 9 September 2022 – 11 June 2023
- Champions: Medeama
- Relegated: King Faisal; Tamale City; Kotoku Royals
- Champions League: Medeama
- Confederation Cup: Dreams
- Matches: 306
- Goals: 608 (1.99 per match)
- Top goalscorer: Abednego Tetteh (18 goals)
- Highest scoring: Bechem United 6–2; Real Tamale United (1 February 2023)
- Longest winning run: 5 matches Accra Lions
- Longest unbeaten run: 6 matches Aduana Stars, Dreams, Asante Kotoko, Medeama
- Longest winless run: 9 matches Kotoku Royals
- Longest losing run: 7 matches Kotoku Royals
- Live Matches on StarTimes Ghana.

The 2022–23 Ghana Premier League, known as the betPawa Premier League for sponsorship reasons, was the 67th season of the top professional association football league in Ghana. The season started in September 2022 and is scheduled to end in June 2023.

Asante Kotoko are the defending champions.

== Teams ==
Eighteen teams will compete in the league; the 15 from the previous season and the 3 winners of the Division One zones. The promoted teams are Samartex and Kotoku Royals who both achieved promotion for the first time. They replaced WAFA, Techiman Eleven Wonders and Elmina Sharks.

Location of the 2022–23 Ghana Premier League teams

=== Stadiums and locations ===
Team	Location	Venue	Capacity
Accra Lions FC	Accra	Accra Sports Stadium	40,000
Aduana Stars	Dormaa Ahenkro	Agyeman Badu Stadium	7,000
Asante Kotoko	Kumasi	Baba Yara Stadium	40,000
Bechem United	Bechem	Nana Gyeabour's Park	5,000
Berekum Chelsea	Berekum	Sports Stadium	5,000
Bibiani Gold Stars	Bibiani	Dun's Park	7,000
Dreams FC	Dawu	Dawu Sports Stadium	5,000
Great Olympics	Accra	Accra Sports Stadium	40,000
Hearts of Oak	Accra	Accra Sports Stadium	40,000
Karela United	Aiyinase	CAM Stadium	5,000
King Faisal	Kumasi	Baba Yara Stadium	40,000
Kotoku Royals	Akim Oda	Akim Oda Stadium	3,000
Legon Cities	Accra	El Wak Stadium	7,000
Medeama	Tarkwa	TNA Park	15,000
Nsoatreman	Nsuatre	Nana Kronmansah Park	2,000
Real Tamale United	Tamale	Tamale Stadium	21,017
Samartex	Samreboi	Samartex Park	7,000
Tamale City FC	Tamale	Tamale Stadium	21,017

=== Club managers and captains ===
The table lists club managers.

Team	Manager	Captain
Accra Lions FC	(England) James Francis	(Ghana) Dominic Nsobila
Aduana Stars	(Ghana) Paa Kwesi Fabin	(Ghana) Bright Adjei
Asante Kotoko	(Burkina Faso) Seydou Zerbo	(Ghana) Richard Boadu
Bechem United	(Ghana) Mingle Ocansey Kasim	(Ghana) Kofi Agbesimah
Berekum Chelsea	(Ghana) Christopher Ennin	(Ghana) Fuseini Zackaria
Bibiani Gold Stars	(Ghana) Micheal Osei	(Ghana) Yakubu Haqq
Dreams FC	(Ghana) Ignatius Osei-Fosu	(Ghana) Abdul Jalilu
Great Olympics	(Ghana) Yaw Preko	(Ghana) Razak Kasim
Hearts of Oak	(Serbia) Slavko Matić	(Ghana) Mohammed Alhassan
Karela United	(Ghana) Bismark Kobby Mensah	(Ghana) Kwadwo Addai
King Faisal	(Ghana) Jimmy Cobblah	(Ghana) Samuel Kusi
Kotoku Royals	(Ghana) Seth Ablade	(Ghana) Kingsley Afriyie
Legon Cities	(Ghana) Maxwell Konadu	(Ghana) Jonah Attuquaye
Medeama	(Ghana) David Duncan	(Ghana) Kwasi Donsu
Nsoatreman FC	(Ghana) Mohammed Gargo	(Ghana) Obed Duah Anford
Real Tamale United	(Ghana) Baba Nuhu	(Ghana) David Abagna
Samartex	(Ghana) Annor Walker	(Ghana) Emmanuel Adu Siaw
Tamale City FC	(Ghana) Mohammed Wahid	(Ghana) Collins Amoah Boateng

=== Managerial changes ===
Team	Outgoing manager	Manner of departure	Date of vacancy	Position in the table	Incoming manager	Date of appointment	References
Real Tamale United	Ibrahim Tanko Shaibu	Resigned	26 July	Pre-season	Baba Nuhu	12 August 2022	
Samartex	Henry Wellington	End of Interim Charge	31 July	Pre-season	Annor Walker	5 August 2022	
Great Olympics	Annor Walker	Signed by Samartex	5 August 2022	Pre-season	Yaw Preko	6 August 2022	
Hearts of Oak	Samuel Boadu	Sacked	28 September 2022	14th	Slavko Matić	19 October 2022	
King Faisal	Branko Božović	Sacked	4 October 2022	18th	Jimmy Cobblah	7 October 2022	
Kotoku Royals	Seth Ablade	Sacked	12 December 2022	18th	John Eduafo	4 February 2023	
Dreams FC	Ignatius Osei-Fosu	Sacked	20 December 2022	16th	Abdul-Karim Zito	5 February 2023	

== League table ==
Pos	Team	Pld	W	D	L	GF	GA	GD	Pts	Promotion or relegation
1	Medeama (C)	34	18	6	10	44	29	+15	60	CAF Champions League
2	Aduana Stars	34	15	10	9	32	25	+7	55	
3	Bechem United	34	16	6	12	42	26	+16	54	
4	Asante Kotoko	34	13	13	8	42	31	+11	52	
5	Bibiani Gold Stars	34	13	10	11	39	36	+3	49	
6	Dreams	34	13	9	12	38	30	+8	48	CAF Confederation Cup (Note: As 2022–23 Ghanaian FA Cup winners)
7	Karela United	34	13	8	13	32	32	0	47	
8	Berekum Chelsea	34	13	8	13	36	35	+1	47	
9	Legon Cities	34	12	10	12	39	38	+1	46	
10	Samartex	34	12	10	12	28	29	−1	46	
11	RTU	34	12	10	12	39	42	−3	46	
12	Hearts of Oak	34	12	10	12	32	37	−5	46	
13	Nsoatreman	34	14	4	16	31	38	−7	46	
14	Accra Lions	34	13	6	15	37	44	−7	45	
15	Great Olympics	34	12	9	13	29	35	−6	45	
16	Tamale City (R)	34	10	12	12	38	37	+1	42	Relegation to Division One League
17	King Faisal (R)	34	12	6	16	31	43	−12	42	Relegation to Division One League
18	Kotoku Royals (R)	34	7	5	22	35	57	−22	26	Relegation to Division One League

Source: Ghana Premier League and Flashscore
(C) Champions; (R) Relegated

== Results ==
Home \ Away	ACC	ADU	ASA	BEC	BER	BIB	DRE	GRE	HEA	KAR	KIN	KOT	LEG	MED	NSO	RTU	SAM	TAM
Accra Lions		3–0	0–1	0–0	2–1	2–2	3–2	3–0	1–3	2–1	0–1	1–1	3–1	4–2	2–0	1–2	1–1	1–0
Aduana Stars	1–1		0–0	1–0	2–1	2–0	0–1	1–0	1–0	0–0	0–0	2–0	1–0	1–0	2–0	2–2	2–2	1–0
Asante Kotoko	4–0	2–1		1–0	2–1	1–1	0–0	1–1	1–1	1–1	0–0	5–1	1–1	0–2	2–1	4–0	2–1	1–1
Bechem United	0–1	0–0	2–0		2–0	2–0	1–0	3–0	1–0	3–1	1–1	1–0	1–0	1–0	3–0	6–2	2–0	0–0
Berekum Chelsea	4–0	1–1	3–0	1–0		0–0	1–0	1–0	0–0	1–0	2–0	2–1	1–0	1–0	1–2	1–2	1–0	1–1
Bibiani Gold Stars	0–0	0–0	1–1	1–0	0–1		0–1	1–0	1–1	2–0	2–1	3–1	3–2	1–1	2–0	1–0	1–0	2–0
Dreams	0–1	0–1	2–0	1–2	2–0	1–0		2–1	0–0	0–0	2–0	1–0	5–1	4–0	1–0	3–1	2–0	0–0
Great Olympics	1–0	0–1	2–0	1–0	2–1	2–2	1–1		1–0	1–0	1–0	2–0	1–1	1–0	2–1	2–1	0–0	1–1
Hearts of Oak	1–0	0–2	1–0	1–2	3–1	2–1	2–2	1–1		0–0	2–0	1–0	0–0	1–5	2–1	1–2	0–0	3–2
Karela United	1–2	1–0	1–0	1–0	4–1	3–2	2–0	0–0	3–0		0–1	2–1	0–2	1–1	1–0	0–0	1–0	1–0
King Faisal	2–1	2–3	0–3	0–0	0–1	0–0	2–1	2–0	0–0	3–2		2–1	3–1	2–3	2–0	1–0	0–2	1–0
Kotoku Royals	1–0	1–1	1–3	3–1	2–1	3–2	3–0	0–2	0–1	2–3	4–2		0–3	1–1	0–0	0–0	0–1	4–1
Legon Cities	2–0	2–0	1–1	1–3	1–1	0–1	0–0	2–0	1–0	1–1	3–1	2–0		0–1	3–2	1–1	3–2	1–1
Medeama	2–0	0–1	0–1	2–1	1–0	1–0	3–2	2–0	0–1	1–0	2–1	1–0	2–0		2–0	3–2	2–0	3–0
Nsoatreman	3–0	2–1	0–0	1–1	2–1	1–0	2–1	2–1	0–1	3–0	1–0	2–1	0–0	1–0		1–0	1–0	1–0
RTU	3–1	1–0	2–1	2–1	0–0	5–1	0–0	3–1	1–0	0–1	0–1	3–2	0–1	1–1	2–0		0–0	0–0
Samartex	1–0	1–0	1–2	1–0	1–1	0–3	0–0	0–0	3–2	1–0	1–0	2–1	2–1	0–0	2–0	3–0		0–0
Tamale City	0–1	2–1	1–1	3–2	2–2	2–3	3–1	2–1	4–1	1–0	4–0	3–0	0–1	0–0	2–1	1–1	1–0	

Legend: Blue = home team win; Yellow = draw; Red = away team win.

== Season statistics ==
=== Top scorers ===
Rank	Player	Club	Goals
1	(Ghana) Abednego Tetteh	Bibiani Gold Stars	18
2	(Ghana) Hafiz Konkoni	Bechem United	15
3	(Ghana) Sampson Eduku	Tamale City	14
4	(Ghana) Francis Andy Kumi	Kotoku Royals	12
4	(Ghana) Jonathan Sowah	Medeama	12
4	(Ghana) Afriye Mezack	Berekum Chelsea	12
4	(Ghana) Vincent Atinga	Medeama	11
4	(Ghana) Issah Kuka	Real Tamale	11
4	(Uganda) Steven Mukwala	Asante Kotoko	11
9	(Ghana) Samuel Ofori	Nsoatreman	10

==== Hat-tricks ====
Player	For	Against	Result	Date
(Ghana) Cephas Kofi Mantey	Bechem United	Nsoatreman	3–0 (H)	20 November 2023
(Ghana) Hafiz Konkoni	Bechem United	Real Tamale United	6–2 (H)	1 February 2023
(Ghana) Issah Kuka	Real Tamale United	Gold Stars	5–1 (H)	16 April 2023
(Ghana) Seidu Basit^{4}	Accra Lions	Medeama	4–2 (H)	23 April 2023

Notes

(H) – Home team

(A) – Away team

=== Assists ===
Rank	Player	Club	Assists
1	(Ghana) Stephen Badu Dankwa	Real Tamale	7
2	(Uganda) Steven Mukwala	Asante Kotoko	5
2	(Ghana) Samuel Adams	Aduana Stars	5
2	(Ghana) Clinton Duodo	Bechem United	5

=== Clean sheets ===
Rank	Player	Club	Clean sheets
1	(Ghana) Felix Kyei	Bechem United	15
1	(Ghana) Joseph Addo	Aduana Stars	15
3	(Ghana) Lawrence Ansah	Berekum Chelsea	12
5	(Ghana) Gregory Obeng	Accra Lions	11
5	(Ghana) Joseph Baah	Asante Kotoko	11

== Awards ==
=== Monthly awards ===
Month	Player of the Month		Manager of the Month		Goalkeeper of the Month		References
Month	Player	Club	Manager	Club	Player	Club	References
September	(Ghana) Kwame Adom Frimpong	Aduana Stars	(Ghana) Christopher Ennin	Berekum Chelsea	(Ghana) Lord Bawa Martey	Dreams	
November	(Ghana) Ibrahim Laar	Bibiani Gold Stars	(Ghana) Michael Osei	Bibiani Gold Stars	(Ghana) Lawrence Ansah	Samartex	
January	(Ghana) Agyenim Boateng Mensah	Dreams	(Ghana) Kassim Mingle Ocansey	Bechem United	(Ghana) Lawrence Ansah	Samartex	
February	(Ghana) Abass Samari	Accra Lions	(Ghana) Paa Kwesi Fabin	Aduana Stars	(Ghana) Cisse Tijani	Tamale City	
March	(Ghana) Dominic Amponsah	Accra Lions	(Ghana) Evans Adotey	Medeama	(Ghana) Felix Kyei	Medeama	
April	(Ghana) Hafiz Konkoni	Bechem United	(Ghana) Paa Kwesi Fabin	Aduana Stars	(Ghana) William Essu	Legon Cities	
May/June	(Ghana) Abednego Tetteh	Bibiani Gold Stars	(Ghana) Evans Adotey	Medeama	(Ghana) Solomon Agbesi	Dreams	
