= 2023–24 Dreams F.C. season =

Ghanaian football club season

The 2023–24 season was the 16th season of Dreams Football Club since their formation in 2009 and their 5th consecutive season in the top-flight of Ghanaian football. In addition to the domestic league, they competed in this season's FA Cup and CAF Confederation Cup, ending both runs at the semi-finals. They ended their league campaign by finishing 9th on the table with the same number of points as the previous season.

== Matches ==
=== Ghana Premier League ===
==== League table ====
Pos	Team	Pld	W	D	L	GF	GA	GD	Pts
7	Nations FC	34	14	7	13	32	28	+4	49
8	Medeama	34	14	7	13	27	26	+1	49
9	Dreams	34	13	9	12	44	35	+9	48
10	Bechem United	34	12	12	10	41	34	+7	48
11	Bibiani Gold Stars	34	12	11	11	41	40	+1	47

Source: Ghana Premier League
Rules for classification: 1) Points; 2) Goal difference; 3) Goals scored; 4) Head-to-head points; 5) Head-to-head goal difference; 6) Head-to-head goals scored; 7) Play-off

==== Results summary ====
Overall								Home						Away					
Pld	W	D	L	GF	GA	GD	Pts	W	D	L	GF	GA	GD	W	D	L	GF	GA	GD
38	18	9	11	77	63	+14	63	11	4	4	44	26	+18	7	5	7	33	37	−4

Source: Soccerway

==== Results by round ====
Round	1	2	3	4	5	6	7	8	9	10	11	12	13	14	15	16	17	18	19	20	21	22	23	24	25	27	28	30	31	32	33	29	35	26	36	36	37	38
Ground	H	A	H	H	A	H	A	A	H	H	A	H	A	H	A	A	H	A	H	A	H	A	H	A	A	A	H	H	H	A	H	A	A	H	H	A	A	H
Result	D	L	W	L	D	L	W	W	D	L	W	D	L	W	L	L	W	L	W	W	W	L	L	W	D	D	W	D	W	D	W	L	D	W	W	W	W	W
Position	11	15	10	12	14	14	11	11	10	11	10	10	10	10	10	12	10	10	10	10	9	10	11	10	10	11	11	11	10	9	9	9	9	8	7	7	6	6
Points	1	1	4	4	5	5	8	11	12	12	15	16	16	19	19	19	22	22	25	28	31	31	31	34	35	36	39	40	43	44	47	47	48	51	54	57	60	63

Source: Soccerway
A = Away; H = Home; W = Win; D = Draw; L = Loss; P = Postponed

=== FA Cup ===
27 December 2023 Round of 64	Dreams FC	1–0	Akim Tafo Susubiribi	Dawu
15:00 UTC	John Antwi 4'	Report		Stadium: Dawu Sports Stadium; Referee: John Owusu

7 January 2024 Round of 32	Heart of Lions	0–2	Dreams FC	Kpando
15:00 UTC		Report	G. Atuahene 4'; Issah 86'	Stadium: Kpando Stadium; Referee: Maxwell Owusu

18 February 2024 Round of 16	Dreams FC	4–1	Koforidua Semper Fi	Dawu
15:00 UTC	D. Adabla (o.g.); Issah 35'; A.B. Meansah 64'; S. Sylvester 86'	Report	Ebenezer Kobia 90+5'	Stadium: Dawu Sports Stadium; Attendance: 8,057; Referee: Mawuli Klu

8 August 2023 Quarter finals	Dreams FC	1–0	Soccer Intellectuals	Dawu
19:00 BST	Issah 31'	Report		Stadium: Dawu Sports Stadium; Referee: Eric Antwi Sefa

12 May 2024 Semi-finals	Bofoakwa Tano	2–1	Dreams FC	Sogakope
15:00 UTC	D. Aboagye 45+3'; E. Addai 90+3'	Report	E. Agyei 61'	Stadium: WAFA Parak; Attendance: 8,057; Referee: Alfaa Ba-Adey Fusseini

=== CAF Confederation Cup ===
19 August 2023 First preliminary round first leg	Milo FC	1–1	Dreams FC	Conakry
15:00 UTC				Stadium: General Lansana Conté Stadium; Attendance: 557

27 August 2023 First preliminary round second leg	Dreams FC	2–1	Milo FC	Accra
15:00 UTC	John Antwi 4'			Stadium: Accra Sports Stadium; Attendance: 8,057; Referee: John Owusu

15 September 2023 Second preliminary round first leg	Dreams FC	2–1	Kallon FC	Accra
15:00 UTC	John Antwi 4'			Stadium: Accra Sports Stadium; Attendance: 8,057; Referee: John Owusu

30 September 2023 Second preliminary round second leg	Kallon FC	1–1	Dreams FC	Paynesville, Liberia
15:00 UTC				Stadium: Samuel Kanyon Doe Sports Complex stadium Attendance: 8,057; Referee: John Owusu

==== Group stage ====
Pos	Team	Pld	W	D	L	GF	GA	GD	Pts	Qualification
1	(Ghana) Dreams FC	6	4	0	2	11	7	+4	12 (Note: Ranked on goal difference: Dreams FC +4, Rivers United +2.)	Advance to knockout stage
2	(Nigeria) Rivers United	6	4	0	2	10	8	+2	12	Advance to knockout stage
3	(Tunisia) Club Africain	6	3	1	2	9	4	+5	10	
4	(Angola) Académica do Lobito	6	0	1	5	6	17	−11	1	

Source: Flashscore
Rules for classification: Group stage tiebreakers
Notes:

26 November 2023 Matchday 1	Club Africain	1–0	Dreams FC	Tunis
15:00 UTC		Report		Stadium: Hammadi Agrebi Stadium; Attendance: 8,057; Referee: Andofetra Rakotojaona (Madagascar)

3 December 2023 Matchday 2	Dreams FC	1–0	Rivers United	Kumasi
15:00 UTC	John Antwi 4'	Report		Stadium: Baba Yara Stadium; Attendance: 8,057; Referee: Messie Nkounkou (Congo)

10 December 2023 Matchday 3	Académica do Lobito	2–3	Dreams FC	Luanda
15:00 UTC	John Antwi 4'	Report		Stadium: Estádio 11 de Novembro; Attendance: 8,057; Referee: Mahmoud El Banna (Egypt)

20 December 2023 Matchday 4	Dreams FC	4–0	Académica do Lobito	Kumasi
15:00 UTC	Agyenim Boateng 35'; Adi Bojó (o.g.) 49'; Issah 4'; Nuhu Tanko 90+2'	Report		Stadium: Baba Yara Sports Stadium; Attendance: 8,057; Referee: Samir Guezzaz (Morocco)

25 February 2024 Matchday 5	Dreams FC	1–0	Club Africain	Kumasi
15:00 UTC	John Antwi 4'	Report		Stadium: Baba Yara Sports Stadium; Attendance: 8,057; Referee: Ahmad Heeralall

3 March 2024 Matchday 6	Rivers United	2–1	Dreams FC	Uyo, Nigeria
15:00 UTC	Deputy Echeta; Godswill Kazie 90+9'	Youcef Gamouh	Abdul Aziz Issah 40'	Stadium: Godswill Akpabio International Stadium; Attendance: 8,057; Referee: Youcef Gamouh (Algeria)

==== Knockout phase ====
27 December 2023 Quarter-finals first leg	Stade Malien	1–2	Dreams FC	Bamako
15:00 UTC		Report		Stadium: Stade du 26 Mars

27 December 2023 Quarter-finals second leg	Dreams F.C.	1–1	Stade Malien	Kumasi
15:00 UTC	John Antwi 4'	Report		Stadium: Baba Yara Stadium

21 April 2024 Semi-finals first leg	Zamalek	0–0	Dreams FC	Cairo
15:00 UTC		Report		Stadium: Cairo International Stadium

28 April 2024 Semi-finals second leg	Dreams FC	0–3	Zamalek	Kumasi
15:00 UTC		Report	Mathlouthi 12'; Akinyoola 27'; Shalaby 59'	Stadium: Baba Yara Stadium; Referee: Alhadi Allaou Mahamat

== Season review ==
Having gained entry to the CAF Confederation Cup with their FA Cup win, executives within the club expressed worries and personal frustrations about financial constraints heading into and throughout their inaugural African campaign which have been publicized. Nevertheless, Dreams F.C. were drawn to play Guinean club Milo FC in the first preliminary round and the winners of AS Douanes of Niger and Kallon FC of Sierra Leone in the second preliminary round for a place in the group stages on 25 July 2023. Dreams beat Milo FC 3–2 on aggregate (1–1 draw at the General Lansana Conté Stadium in Conakry and 2–1 at the Baba Yara Stadium in Kumasi, where their CAF campaign would be based). They secured a 3–2 win on aggregate against Kallon, whose first qualifying round opponents AS Douanes withdrew due to the Niger conflict, 2–1 at home and a 1–1 draw away at the Samuel Kanyon Doe Sports Complex stadium in Paynesville, Liberia to confirm their place in the group stages.

In the knockout stages, Dreams FC were drawn with Malian side Stade Malien and the winner of Egyptian teams Zamalek SC and Modern Future FC for a place in the final. The defeated Stade Malien 3–2 on aggregate (2–1 away at the Stade du 26 Mars and 1–1 at home) to secure their semi-final spot and receive $750,000. Their journey would however come to an end with Zamalek eliminating them and Modern Future on aggregate; in the case of Dreams a 3–0 away win in Kumasi despite Dreams holding them to a goalless first-leg draw in the first-leg. Overall, their cash flow from their participation amounted to $1.2 million (GHS21 million) and their participant points accumulation coupled with Medeama SC's qualification for the group stage of the CAF Champions League raised Ghana's CAF club ranking from 27th to 14th, just 2 places shy of 12th, where the country could have entered two teams in those CAF club competitions. Their run as defending champions in the FA Cup was brought to an end by Bofoakwa Tano as they defeated them 2–1 at the semi-finals. Their 2024–25 league season ended with a 9th-place finish.
