= Daniel Awuni =

Ghanaian footballer (born 2006)

Personal information
- Full name: Daniel Kwame Awuni
- Date of birth: 13 February 2006 (age 20)
- Place of birth: Accra, Ghana
- Height: 1.71 m (5 ft 7 in)
- Position: Right winger

Team information
- Current team: Čukarički

Youth career
- Topscout Football Academy

Senior career*
Years	Team	Apps	(Gls)
2021–2025	Accra Lions	86	(8)
2024	→ Sarpsborg 08 II (loan)	2	(2)
2025–	Čukarički	0	(0)

International career
2022	Ghana U17	3	(1)
2024	Ghana U20	4	(1)
- * Club domestic league appearances and goals as of 17:04, 16 December 2022 (UTC)

Daniel Kwame Awuni (born 13 February 2006) is a Ghanaian footballer who plays as a right winger for Serbian club Čukarički.

== Club career ==
Awuni signed for Ghana Premier League side Accra Lions from Topscout Football Academy in September 2021. His career in Accra got off to a good start, with Awuni finding the net multiple times for his new club.

On 24 January 2025, Awuni signed a four-year contract with Čukarički in Serbia.

== Career statistics ==
=== Club ===
As of 16 December 2022

Appearances and goals by club, season and competition
Club	Season	League			Cup		Other		Total	
Club	Season	Division	Apps	Goals	Apps	Goals	Apps	Goals	Apps	Goals
Accra Lions	2021–22	Ghana Premier League	27	2	0	0	0	0	27	2
Accra Lions	2022–23	Ghana Premier League	8	2	0	0	0	0	8	2
Career total			35	4	0	0	0	0	35	4
