= Aziz Issah =

Ghanaian professional footballer

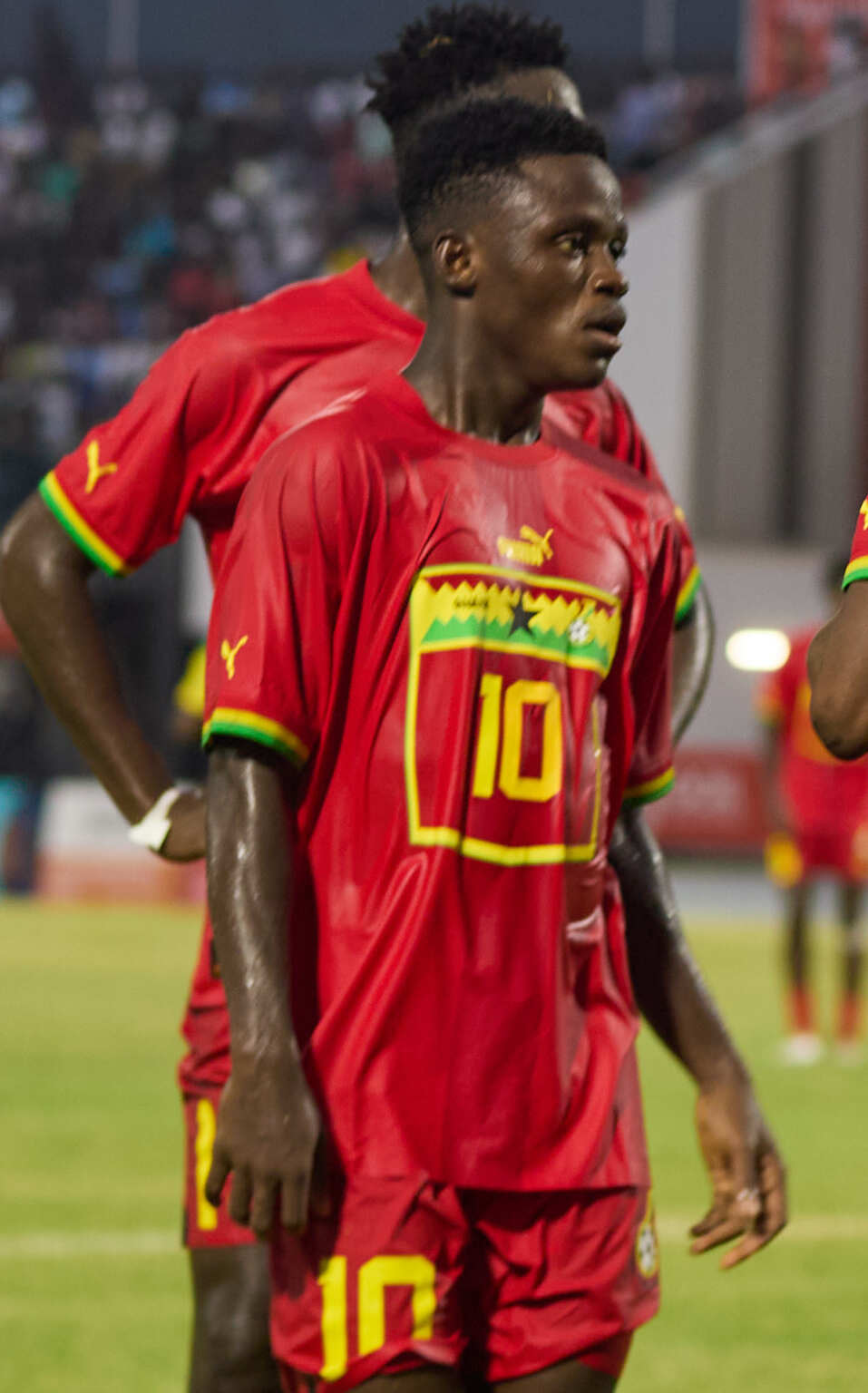
- Issah playing for Ghana U-20 in 2024

Personal information
- Full name: Abdul Aziz Issah
- Date of birth: 20 November 2005 (age 20)
- Place of birth: Accra, Ghana
- Height: 1.63 m (5 ft 4 in)
- Position: Winger

Team information
- Current team: Barcelona B
- Number: 7

Senior career*
Years	Team	Apps	(Gls)
2022–2026	Dreams	49	(8)
2024–2026	→ Barcelona B (loan)	22	(4)
2026–	Barcelona B	0	(0)

International career^{‡}
2023–	Ghana U20	5	(1)
2025–	Ghana	1	(0)
- * Club domestic league appearances and goals as of 28 July 2026 ‡ National team caps and goals as of 22:53, 6 June 2024 (UTC)

Abdul Aziz Issah (born 20 November 2005) is a Ghanaian professional footballer who plays as a right winger for Segunda Federación club Barcelona Atlètic and the Ghana national team.

Issah began his senior career with Dreams FC, helping the club win its first Ghana FA Cup in 2023. He subsequently played a prominent role in Dreams' run to the semi-finals of the 2023–24 CAF Confederation Cup, finishing as the competition's joint-top scorer with four goals. After spending two seasons on loan with Barcelona Atlètic, he joined the club permanently in July 2026, signing a contract until June 2028 with an option for a further season.

At international level, Issah represented Ghana at under-20 level and was part of the team that won the men's football tournament at the 2023 African Games. He made his senior international debut for Ghana in May 2025.

== Club career ==
=== Dreams FC ===
Issah developed through the youth system of Dreams FC before being promoted to the senior team in 2022. He made his Ghana Premier League debut on 17 September 2022, replacing Ishmael Dede in the closing stages of a 1–0 victory over Kotoku Royals.

During his first senior season, Issah became a regular member of the team and played an important role in Dreams' run to the 2022–23 Ghana FA Cup final. In the final on 18 June 2023, he scored the opening goal with a solo effort as Dreams defeated King Faisal 2–0 to win the competition for the first time. The victory also secured the club's qualification for the CAF Confederation Cup.

Following the season, Issah was nominated for the Ghana FA Cup Player of the Season and Discovery of the Season awards. He was subsequently named the competition's Discovery of the Season at the 2023 Ghana Football Association Awards, while Samuel Adom Antwi received the Player of the Season award.

During the 2023–24 season, Issah established himself as one of Dreams FC's most influential players as the club made a historic run in the 2023–24 CAF Confederation Cup. On 3 December 2023, he scored his first continental goal, netting the second in a 2–1 victory over Rivers United in the group stage of the competition. In their third group match, he scored again to help Dreams to a 3–2 victory over Angolan side Académica do Lobito sending the team to the top of Group C. In their maiden appearance in a CAF inter-club competition, Dreams reached the semi-finals after defeating Stade Malien 3–2 on aggregate in the quarter-finals, becoming the first Ghanaian club in two decades to reach the knockout stages of a CAF club competition.

Issah played a pivotal role throughout the campaign, finishing as the competition's joint-leading scorer with four goals while also providing two assists. Ahead of the semi-final second leg against Zamalek SC, CAF statistics showed that he had been directly involved in 52 shots—more than any other player in the competition and had created or finished 46% of Dreams FC's total attempts on goal. Dreams' campaign ended in the semi-finals following a 3–0 aggregate defeat to eventual champions Zamalek.

In addition to his contributions in the CAF competition, Issah played a crucial role in Dreams FC's 2023–24 Ghana Premier League campaign, scoring 7 goals in 24 matches. He also maintained his strong form in the FA Cup, netting 4 goals in 5 games.

=== Barcelona Atlètic ===
On 3 September 2024, Issah joined Spanish club Barcelona Atlètic on a season-long loan from Dreams FC, with the agreement including an option to make the transfer permanent. Having already established himself in Ghanaian football and impressed during Dreams FC's CAF Confederation Cup campaign, he arrived at the club as one of Africa's most highly rated young wingers.

Issah's integration into the squad was initially delayed by administrative and registration procedures, limiting his opportunities during the opening months of the season. On 6 November 2024, Issah made his official debut for Barcelona Atlètic, coming on as a 74th-minute substitute for Noah Darvich in a 1–1 Primera Federación draw against Real Sociedad B. He went on to make two league appearances during the 2024–25 season before returning to Ghana to represent the national under-20 team at the 2025 U-20 Africa Cup of Nations.

On 22 July 2025, Barcelona and Dreams FC agreed a second season-long loan, allowing Issah to continue his development with the reserve side under Juliano Belletti. During the 2025–26 season, he established himself as a regular member of the squad, making 20 appearances, scoring four goals and providing one assist in all competitions.

Following two loan spells, Barcelona completed Issah's permanent transfer from Dreams FC on 27 July 2026. He signed a two-year contract until 30 June 2028, with the club holding an option to extend the agreement by a further season.

== International career ==
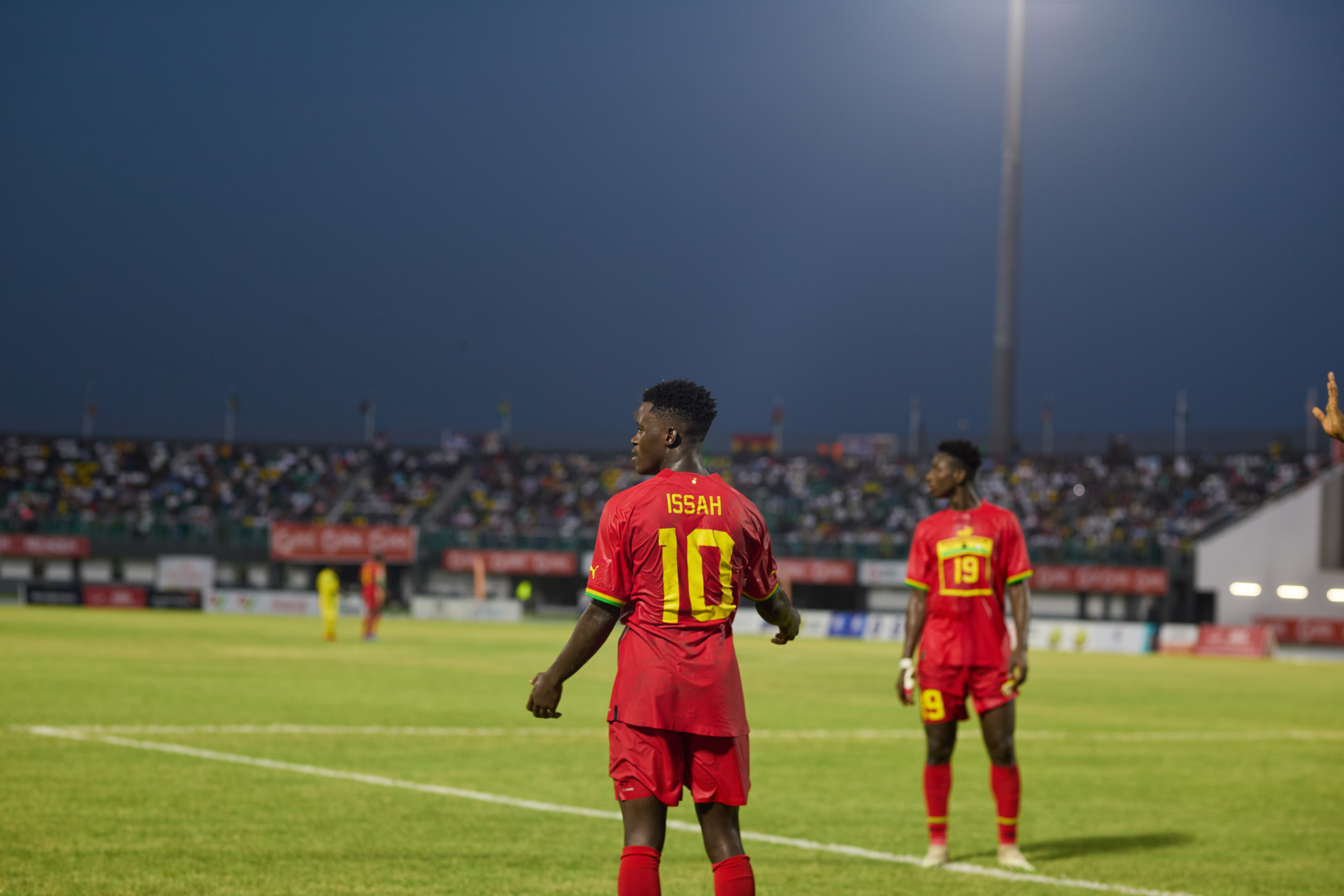
Issah playing for Ghana U-20 at the 2023 African Games.

Issah represented Ghana at under-20 level and was part of the squad that won the men's football tournament at the 2023 African Games, held in Ghana. On 12 March 2024, he Ghana's second goal in a 3–1 victory over Gambia, in the team's second group-stage match. He featured throughout the competition as the hosts defeated Uganda 1–0 in the final to claim the gold medal.

Following his performances for Dreams FC and at youth international level, Issah was named in Ghana's squad for the 2025 U-20 Africa Cup of Nations in Egypt. He featured during the tournament as Ghana reached the quarter-finals before being eliminated on penalties by hosts Egypt.

On 28 May 2025, Issah received his first senior call-up to the Ghana national football team for the 2025 Unity Cup in London. He made his senior international debut on 31 May, coming on as a second-half substitute in Ghana's 4–0 victory over Trinidad and Tobago in the tournament's third-place play-off.

== Honours ==
Dreams

- Ghana FA Cup: 2022–23

Ghana U20

- African Games: 2023

Individual

- Ghana FA Cup Discovery of the Season: 2022–23
- Odartey Lamptey Future Star Award: 2024
- CAF Confederation Cup top scorer: 2023–24
- SWAG Prospect of the Year: 2024
- SWAG Footballer of the Year: 2024
