= Hafiz Konkoni =

Ghanaian professional footballer (born 1999)

Hafiz Wontah Konkoni
Personal information
- Full name: Hafiz Wontah Konkoni
- Date of birth: 5 June 1999 (age 27)
- Place of birth: Wa, Upper West Region, Ghana
- Height: 1.85 m (6 ft 1 in)
- Position: Forward

Team information
- Current team: Halaba City FC
- Number: 9

Senior career*
Years	Team	Apps	(Gls)
2016–2017	Bolga All Stars	8	(2)
2017–2018	Bechem United	22	(9)
2018–2019	Alsancak Yeşilova	5	(1)
2018	→ Baf Ülkü Yurdu (loan)		
2019–2023	Bechem United	85	(26)
2023–2024	Young Africans	2	(1)
2024 —	Olympic Azzawiya SC (loan)		
2024 — 2026	Ethiopia Coffee SC	29	(7)
2025 (loan)	Welwalo Adigrat	33	(5)
2026	Halaba City FC	0	(0)
- * Club domestic league appearances and goals as of Ethiopia Coffee SC

Hafiz Wontah Konkoni (born 5 June 1999) is a Ghanaian professional footballer who plays as forward for Ethiopian Ethiopian Premier League side Halaba City FC. He previously had spells in Northern Cyprus playing for Alsancak Yeşilova and Baf Ülkü Yurdu.

== Early life ==
Konkoni is a native of Wa in the Upper West Region of Ghana. He moved to the Northern Region and attended secondary school education in Bole, before later returning to his home region to enroll at Tumu College of Education, previously Tumu Teacher Training College. He is a trained teacher by profession.

== Career ==
=== Bolga Stars ===
Konkoni started his senior career with lower-tier side Amajande FC in Bole. He served as the captain of the side and helped the club to earn a promotion into the Ghana Division One league during his playing time with the club. His performances attracted deals from clubs with the Division one and Premier League. He eventually joined newly premier league promoted side Bolga Stars in 2017, whilst training as a teacher in Tumu.

Konkoni joined Bolga Stars after they had earned a promotion into the Ghana Premier League for the 2017 season. He played alongside Ibrahim Imoro within that period. He made his debut on 4 March 2017, playing the full 90 minutes in a 2–0 loss to Tema Youth. On 18 March 2023, he scored his first Ghana Premier league goal ever against his future club, Bechem United in the 78th minute at Aliu Mahama Sports Stadium helping Bolga All Stars to a 2–0 victory, the club's first ever Ghana Premier League victory.

Due to combining studies and football and travelling between two Upper West and Upper East regions, he made 8 league appearances and scored 2 goals before joining Bechem United in the May transfer period.

=== Bechem United ===
In May 2017, Konkoni joined Ghana Premier League side Bechem United ahead of the second half of the 2017 Ghana Premier League season. In April 2018, Konkoni scored his first and second goals of the season by scoring a brace against Dreams. He scored another brace against Wa All Stars in a 2–1 victory. At the end of April, he had scored five goals in six matches and was nominated for the Player of the Month.

On 2 May, Konkoni scored a late brace in the 86th and 89th minute to complete a comeback to secure a 3–3 draw against Elmina Sharks after Benjamin Tweneboah had also scored a brace for Sharks. In his second season with the club, he scored 8 goals in 12 league ending as the top scorer before the league cancelled due to the dissolution of the Ghana Football Association in June 2018, as a result of the Anas Number 12 Expose.

=== Alsancak Yesilova ===
In October 2018, Konkoni signed a two-year deal with Northern Cypriot side Merit Alsancak Yeşilova. During his first campaign with the club, he made five appearances scoring one and with four assists as his season was interrupted due to a series of injuries. He was later loaned out to Baf Ülkü Yurdu.

=== Return to Bechem United ===
Ahead of the 2019–20 season, Konkoni returned to his former club and featured in 14 league matches, scored 2 goals and made 1 assists before the league was truncated due to the COVID-19 pandemic. In 2020–21 season, he become the main attacker for Bechem United. He started the season on a good note, scoring his first goal of the season, in a 1–0 home victory over West African Football Academy during the second match of the season. He went on to score a late winner against Inter Allies in a 2–1 away victory in December 2020. His form took nose dive after not scoring six consecutive match days until he scored in a 3–1 victory over Techiman Eleven Wonders. After ending that goal drought, he went on to score five goals in ten league matches between January and May 2021. Two of those goals was scored in a 4–0 victory against their fierce rivals Aduana Stars. On 12 May 2021, Konkoni suffered a left arm injury while playing in the Ghana Premier League match against Hearts of Oak, after colliding with Hearts' goalkeeper Richard Attah. The following day, it was confirmed that he fractured left arm and would miss the remainder of the season. Prior to sustaining the injury he had scored 8 goals in 23 league matches.

Konkoni made his return from injury in the 2021–22 season and played his first match after seven months, coming on in the 63rd minute in a 1–0 victory over King Faisal. On 18 May 2022, he scored his first goal since returning from injury, an 89th-minute late equaliser after coming off the bench in Bechem's match against Real Tamale United. He struggled to find form after returning from injury, scoring only one goal in 22 league appearances at the end of the 2021–22 season.

Konkoni scored his first goal in the 2022–23 season on 2 January 2023, in a 2–1 victory over Hearts of Oak. On the following match day, he equalised in the 93rd minute to secure a 1–1 draw against King Faisal. On 1 February, he scored a hat-trick as Bechem United defeated Real Tamale United by 6–2, his first career hat-trick. On 19 February, match-day 10, he was involved in all three goals, scoring two and assisting one in a 3–0 win over Accra Great Olympics. In April, Konkoni scored four goals in five matches including a brace against Tamale City. His performance earned him the Ghana Premier League Player of the Month for April 2023.

He ended the season as the second top goalscorer of the season with 15 goals in 26 matches, 3 goals behind eventual winner Abednego Tetteh.

Over four seasons in two spells, he made 107 league appearances and scored 35 goals.

=== Young Africans ===
On 29 July 2023, Konkoni signed a two-year contract with Young Africans which will keep him in Tanzania until 2025, with an option for another year. He was signed by the club for $100,000 with a 25% sell-on clause of any future transfer fee for Bechem United. Konkoni made his debut at National Stadium on 23 August as a second-half substitute, scored the third goal of a 5–0 win over Kinondoni and also provided the assist for Mudathir Yahya to score the fourth goal.

Three days later, he scored his CAF Champions League debut goal against Djibouti Telecom in the second leg of the 2023–24 CAF Champions League first round qualifier which ended in a 5–1 victory after making his debut in the first leg on 20 August.

== International career ==
Based on his 2022–23 league form Konkoni earned his maiden call-up from Chris Hughton to the Ghana national team ahead of the 2023 Africa Cup of Nations qualifier against Madagascar in June 2023. Hughton praised him for his performances in the Ghana Premier League, saying he had enjoyed watching him play.

== Personal life ==
Konkoni married his long-time girlfriend in June 2019 at Suuriyiri mosque in the Northern Region. He is a devout Muslim.

== Honours ==
Individual

- Ghana Premier League Player of the Month: April 2023
