= Solomon Agbasi =

Ghanaian professional footballer

Personal information
- Date of birth: 13 October 2000 (age 26)
- Place of birth: Ghana
- Position: Goalkeeper

Team information
- Current team: Stellenbosch
- Number: 16

Senior career*
Years	Team	Apps	(Gls)
2019–2024	Dreams	60	(0)
2025–2026	Hearts of Oak	10	(0)
2026-	Stellenbosch	0	(0)

International career^{‡}
2026–	Ghana	1	(0)
- * Club domestic league appearances and goals as of 24 June 2023 ‡ National team caps and goals as of 22 May 2026

Solomon Agbasi (born 13 October 2000) is a Ghanaian professional footballer who plays as a goalkeeper for PSL club Stellenbosch and the Ghana national team.

== Career ==
In October 2019, Agbasi was signed by Ghana Premier League side Dreams ahead of the 2019–20 Ghana Premier League season and was named on the squad list for the season. He was first included in a senior match-day squad on 29 December 2019, in the League match against King Faisal Babes at Dawu Sports Stadium (Theatre of Dreams), remaining unused as the team won 4–1. He made eight match-day squads, but did not make his debut before the league was truncated due to the COVID-19 pandemic in Ghana.

Ahead of the 2020–21 season, Agbasi was named on the team's squad list as the league was set to restart in November 2020. On 16 November 2020, he made his debut, keeping a clean sheet in a goalless draw against International Allies. He went on to play in 21 league matches for Dreams before suffering an injury in a match against WAFA in June 2021. He returned from injury in time to start the 2021–22 season in goal for Dreams, but he was sidelined again before match day three with Augustine Koomson playing in his stead. He did not feature for Dreams until 18 May 2022 (match day 29), when they faced Legon Cities. He appeared in the final six games of the season, recording four clean sheets. Over time, Agbasi established himself as a dependable goalkeeper, putting in outstanding performances thanks to his shot-stopping abilities and quick reflexes.

Agbasi lost his starting spot in the first half of the 2022–23 season to Lord Bawa Martey and Augustine Koomson. In March 2023, he regained his starting spot in a goalless draw against Karela United in March 2023. He went on to play in 13 league games, keeping 8 clean sheets in the process. In the final month of the season, he kept 4 clean sheets and conceded 1 goal helping his team to a 6th-place finish in the Ghana Premier League. He was adjudged the Goalkeeper of the Month for his performances.

Agbasi was instrumental in Dreams' 2022–23 Ghana FA Cup run, with notable performances in the round of 16, quarter-final and semi-final. In the semi-final against Sky Football Club, he saved a penalty in the first half and made crucial saves throughout the match to help Dreams advance to the final. On 18 June 2023, Agbasi started in goal in the 2023 Ghana FA Cup final against King Faisal Babes, keeping a clean sheet in a 2–0 victory to win the trophy for the first time in the club's history. In the four games he played in the competition, he kept three clean sheets. In august 2025 Agbasi joined Hearts of Oak and would stay there for one season.

In September 2026, Agbasi joined Stellenbosch on a long term deal

== Honours ==
Dreams

- Ghana FA Cup: 2022–23

Individual

- Ghana Premier League Goalkeeper of the Month: May/June 2023
- Ghana FA Cup Goalkeeper of the Season: 2022–23
