= Dominic Amponsah =

Ghanaian footballer (born 2006)

Personal information
- Date of birth: 15 May 2006 (age 20)
- Position: Forward

Team information
- Current team: Dila
- Number: 14

Youth career
- Accra Lions

Senior career*
Years	Team	Apps	(Gls)
2023	Accra Lions	42	(9)
2024–	Dila	16	(0)
- * Club domestic league appearances and goals as of 30 May 2025

Dominic Amponsah (born 15 May 2006) is a Ghanaian professional footballer who plays as a forward for Georgian club Dila.

== Club career ==
Having been promoted to the Accra Lions first team in early 2023, Amponsah's career got off to a good start, scoring four goals in his first three games in the Ghana Premier League.

In August 2024, Amponsah joined Georgian club Dila.

== Career statistics ==
=== Club ===
As of 29 May 2025

Appearances and goals by club, season and competition
Club	Season	League			Cup		Other		Total	
Club	Season	Division	Apps	Goals	Apps	Goals	Apps	Goals	Apps	Goals
Accra Lions	2022–23	Ghana Premier League	4	4	0	0	0	0	4	4
Dila	2024	Erovnuli Liga	9	0	0	0	0	0	9	0
Dila	2025	Erovnuli Liga	7	0	0	0	0	0	7	0
Dila	Total		16	0	0	0	0	0	16	0
Career total			20	4	0	0	0	0	20	4
