= Akoon Park =

Sports stadium in Tarkwa

- Interactive map of Akoon Park
- Full name: Tarkwa Akoon Park
- Address: Ghana
- Location: Tarkwa, Western Region, Ghana
- Coordinates: 5°19′0.980″N 1°59′35.324″W

Construction
- Built: 1970s

Tenants
- Nzema Kotoko Football Club; Medeama SC; Karela United

Akoon Park (also known as Tarkwa Akoon Park) is a football park in the Akoon community of Tarkwa in Tarkwa Nsuaem Municipal Assembly in Ghana. It has a seating capacity of 1500. It had been the home of the Medeama Sporting Club and the Karela United Club. It is also the home base for the Nzema Kotoko Football Club, a first division club in the Western region.

== History ==
The State Gold Mining Corporation constructed the park in the 1970s.
