= Kwame Adom Frimpong =

Ghanaian footballer

Personal information
- Date of birth: 19 December 1996 (age 29)
- Height: 1.80 m (5 ft 11 in)
- Position: Defensive midfielder

Senior career*
Years	Team	Apps	(Gls)
2015	Dalkurd	0	(0)
2016	KSF Prespa Birlik	21	(0)
2017–2018	Mjällby	12	(1)
2018–2019	Salalah	-	(-)
2019–2021	Asante Kotoko	26	(0)
2021–2023	Aduana Stars	56	(5)
2023–2025	Saint George	40	(1)
- * Club domestic league appearances and goals

Kwame Adom Frimpong (born 19 December 1996) is a Ghanaian professional footballer who plays as a midfielder. He began his senior career in Sweden, playing for Dalkurd FF, KSF Prespa Birlik and Mjällby AIF, before spending a season with Omani club Salalah SC.

Frimpong returned to Ghana in 2019 to join Asante Kotoko, where he also featured in African club competitions. After leaving Kotoko in 2021, he spent two seasons with Aduana Stars, helping the club finish runners-up in the 2022–23 Ghana Premier League and winning the league's Player of the Month award for September 2022. In 2023, he moved to Ethiopia to join Saint George.

== Career ==
=== Sweden and Oman ===
Frimpong began his senior career in Sweden with Dalkurd FF in 2015. In 2016, he joined KSF Prespa Birlik, who had recently been promoted to Division 1. He made his league debut for the club on 30 April 2016 in a 2–1 defeat to IK Oddevold. He made 21 league appearances during the 2016 season.

In December 2016, Frimpong joined fellow Division 1 club Mjällby AIF on a free transfer. He made 12 league appearances during the 2017 season.

After leaving Mjällby, Frimpong moved to Oman and joined Oman First Division League side Salalah SC in 2018. He spent one season with the club before leaving at the end of the campaign.

=== Asante Kotoko ===
In December 2019, Frimpong returned to Ghana and signed a three-year contract with Asante Kotoko ahead of the 2019–20 Ghana Premier League season. He joined the club as a free agent following his spell with Salalah in Oman.

Frimpong made his league debut for Kotoko on 12 January 2020, coming on as a substitute for Mudasiru Salifu in a 1–0 defeat to Berekum Chelsea. He made 11 league appearances during the season before the competition was cancelled due to the COVID-19 pandemic.

Frimpong remained with Kotoko for the 2020–21 season and also featured in continental competition. He played in all three of the club's matches in the 2020–21 CAF Champions League and made one appearance in the 2020–21 CAF Confederation Cup, against ES Sétif.

Ahead of the 2021–22 season, Frimpong was deemed surplus to requirements by newly appointed head coach Prosper Narteh Ogum and left the club.

=== Aduana Stars ===
Following his departure from Asante Kotoko, Frimpong joined Aduana Stars ahead of the 2021–22 Ghana Premier League season. Frimpong became a regular member of the team and continued with the club during the 2022–23 season. In September 2022, he scored twice in three league matches and was named the Ghana Premier League Player of the Month, having also been named man of the match in two of the three games.

He remained an important member of the Aduana side as the club challenged for the league title during the 2022–23 season. Frimpong scored three league goals during the campaign as Aduana eventually finished second in the Ghana Premier League.

Frimpong left Aduana Stars following the conclusion of the 2022–23 season.

=== Saint George ===
In August 2023, Frimpong moved to Ethiopia and signed a two-year contract with reigning Ethiopian Premier League champions Saint George on a free transfer following the expiration of his contract with Aduana Stars.

Frimpong featured for Saint George in the 2023–24 CAF Champions League. He started both legs of the club's second qualifying round tie against defending champions Al Ahly, which Saint George lost 7–0 on aggregate.

== Style of play ==
Frimpong primarily plays as a central midfielder, and is also capable of operating in defensive and attacking midfield roles. He has been noted for his passing, creativity and ability to dictate the tempo of matches, while also contributing defensively through his tackling. During his time at Aduana Stars, the Ghana Football Association described him as one of the club's experienced midfielders capable of influencing matches from midfield.

== Honours ==
Individual

- Ghana Premier League Player of the Month: September 2022
