= Mutawakilu Fuseini =

Ghanaian association football player

Personal information
- Date of birth: 1 June 1996 (age 30)
- Place of birth: Accra, Ghana
- Height: 1.85 m (6 ft 1 in)
- Position: Centre back

Youth career
- 2007–2010: Saraphina FC
- 2011–2012: Liberty Prof Youth Club

Senior career*
Years	Team	Apps	(Gls)
2013–2014	King Faisal Babes	13	(4)
2014–2015	Young Wise FC	15	(3)
2016–2018	Liberty Professionals	6	(0)
- * Club domestic league appearances and goals as of 15 January 2019

Mutawakilu Fuseini (born 1 June 1996) is a Ghanaian professional footballer who plays as a centre back.

== Career ==
Fuseini began his career with lower division club Saraphina FC, has played in Ghana for King Faisal Babes, Young Wise FC, and Liberty Professionals.

== Liberty ==
Fuseini joined Liberty Professionals on one-year deal in January 2016.
