= Ali Huzaif =

Ghanaian professional footballer

Personal information
- Full name: Ali Huzaif
- Date of birth: March 12, 1999 (age 27)
- Place of birth: Ghana
- Position: Forward

Team information
- Current team: Dreams FC

Senior career*
Years	Team	Apps	(Gls)
2019–2020	Bofoakwa Tano		(5)
2020–	Dreams FC		
- * Club domestic league appearances and goals

Ali Huzaif (born 12 March 1999) is a Ghanaian professional footballer who plays as a forward for Ghanaian Premier League side Dreams F.C.

== Career ==
=== Bofoakwa Tano ===
Hafaiz scored 12 goals while playing in the Ghana Division II League before earning a switch to Bofoakwa Tano in 2019. Hazaif played for Bofoakwa Tano in the Ghana Division One League during the 2019–20 season. He scored 5 goals before the league was suspended because of the COVID-19 pandemic.

=== Dreams FC ===
In May 2020, Hafaiz was signed by Ghana Premier League side Dreams FC, whilst the league had been suspended and was yet to resume. He signed a 3-year deal after completing his mandatory medicals. The league was however cancelled due to the COVID-19 pandemic. Ahead of the 2020–21 Ghana Premier League season, he was named on the team's squad list as the league was set to restart in November 2020. On 16 November 2020, he made his debut, playing 72 minutes before being substituted for Abel Manomey in a goalless draw against International Allies.
