= Evans Adotey =

Ghanaian football team manager

Personal information
- Full name: Evans Augustine Adotey
- Date of birth: 24 September 1964 (age 62)

Team information
- Current team: Medeama (manager)

Managerial career
- Years: Team
- 2013: Medeama
- 2014–2017: Ghana women's U17
- 2016–2017: Medeama
- 2020–2021: Karela United
- 2023–: Medeama

Evans Augustine Adotey (born 24 September 1964) is a Ghanaian football team manager who currently coaches Ghana Premier League side Medeama. He previously coached Ghana women's national under-17 football team and Karela United.

== Coaching career ==
=== Medeama ===
Adotey joined Medeama in 2013 as an assistant coach. In March 2013, he was appointed as interim coach and lead the club to their first Ghana FA Cup win and led them to a 4th place finish by the end of the 2012–13 Ghana Premier League season.

He later served as the assistant coach to Hans van der Pluijm from 2013 to 2015. In November 2015, he was promoted to the position of technical director for the club, serving in that role from 2015 to 2017. He served as interim coach after Tom Strand left the club, and later doubled as head coach of the club and technical director from 2016 to 2017 especially during the 2017 Ghana Premier League. During his 4-year period with the club as interim head coach, assistant coach and technical director, he helped the club to win two Ghana FA Cup in 2013 and 2015 and the Ghana Super Cup in 2016.

=== Ghana national teams ===
Adotey served as coach for the Ghana women's national under-17 football team, the Black Maidens from 2014 to 2019, in the process leading the team to three consecutive quarter-final place in three FIFA U-17 Women's World Cup campaigns. In January 2020, he was appointed as the 1st assistant coach of the Ghana national under-20 football team to Abdul-Karim Zito.

=== Karela United ===
On 14 April 2020, Karela United announced the appointment of Adotey as the team's new head coach succeeding Enos Adepa who had left the club via a mutual agreement in March. The club was 17th on the 2019–20 Ghana Premier League table with 11 points at the time of his appointment, following a 15-game run in which they won only two league matches while losing seven and drawing four before the league was suspended in March 2020 due to the COVID-19 pandemic. His main task was to get the club out of the relegation zone if the league resumed, but it was later cancelled in July 2020.

In February 2021, Adotey was named coach of the month for January 2021, and Karela United striker Diawisie Taylor also being named player of the month after an impressive performance in which the club won three matches, drew one, and lost one out of five matches in the month of January.

== Honours ==
=== Manager ===
Medeama

- Ghana Premier League: 2022–23
- Ghana FA Cup: 2013, 2015
- Ghana Super Cup: 2016

Individual

- Ghana FA Cup Coach of the Year: 2013
- Ghana Premier League Manager of the Month: January 2021, March 2023, April/June 2023
