= Adam Saad (footballer, born 2004) =

Ghanaian footballer

Personal information
- Date of birth: 8 February 2004 (age 22)
- Position: Forward

Team information
- Current team: Dreams
- Number: 18

Senior career*
Years	Team	Apps	(Gls)
2020–	Dreams	3	(0)
- * Club domestic league appearances and goals as of 17:44, 12 April 2020 (UTC)

Adam Saad (born 8 February 2004) is a Ghanaian footballer who currently plays as a forward for Ghana Premier League side Dreams.

== Career statistics ==
=== Club ===
As of 12 April 2020.

Club	Season	League			Cup		Continental		Other		Total	
Club	Season	Division	Apps	Goals	Apps	Goals	Apps	Goals	Apps	Goals	Apps	Goals
Dreams	2019–20	Ghana Premier League	3	0	0	0	–		0	0	3	0
Career total			3	0	0	0	0	0	0	0	3	0
