= Abass Samari Salifu =

Ghanaian professional footballer

Personal information
- Date of birth: 2 July 2004 (age 22)
- Place of birth: Ghana
- Height: 1.73 m (5 ft 8 in)
- Position: Midfielder

Team information
- Current team: Hapoel Kfar Shalem
- Number: 17

Senior career*
Years	Team	Apps	(Gls)
–2021	Young Apostles FC		
2021–2024	Accra Lions	63	(12)
2024–2025	Hapoel Ramat HaSharon	7	(1)
2025–	Hapoel Kfar Shalem	27	(2)

International career
2021–	Ghana U20	4	(1)
- * Club domestic league appearances and goals as of 24 June 2026

Abass Samari Salifu (born 2 July 2004) is a Ghanaian professional footballer who plays as a midfielder for Liga Leumit club Hapoel Kfar Shalem, the Ghana U-20 team and the Ghana U-23 national teams.

== Club career ==
Salifu started his career playing for Division One League side Young Apostles FC. In the 2020–21 season, he played in 16 games across all competitions, scoring three goals and assisting six others. He also received five league and one FA Cup man of the match awards. Salifu played a limited number of matches due to late registration and then an injury, but he was an important figure for the team as they finished sixth in the league.

In September 2021, Salifu joined newly Ghana Premier League promoted side Accra Lions ahead of their debut season after winning the Ghana Division One Zone III. He made his debut for the club after starting their first ever Ghana Premier League match against Elmina Sharks. He however sustained an injury in the 25th minute as Accra Lions drew 1–1. He scored his first goal on the final day of the season against the champions Asante Kotoko with the match ending in a 1–1 draw. He played 24 games in his first GPL season, scoring one goal and assisting on three others. Salifu gained prominence in the 2022–23 season, after scoring 9 goals and providing 2 assists between January and March. As a result of his performances, he was awarded the GPL Player of the Month for February 2023.

== International career ==
In August 2021, Salifu was called up to the Ghana U-20 team ahead up the team's upcoming international assignments. In June 2022, he made the squad for the 2022 Maurice Revello Tournament. Salifu played in all of the tournament's matches in June 2022, scoring the game-winning goal in the team's final match, a 2–1 victory over Saudi Arabia.

== Honours ==
Individual

- Ghana Premier League Player of the Month: February 2023
