= Seth Ablade =

Ghanaian footballer

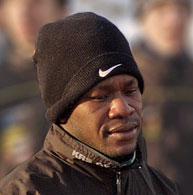

Personal information
- Date of birth: 30 April 1983 (age 43)
- Place of birth: Teshie, Ghana
- Position: Midfielder

Youth career
- 1995-1996: Accra Angels Soccer Academy
- 1997: Great Redeemers FC
- 1998–1999: Kärnten

Senior career*
Years	Team	Apps	(Gls)
1999–2003	Kärnten	3	(0)
2000–2002	→ SVG Bleiburg (loan)		
2003	→ Polonia Warsaw (loan)	4	(0)
2003–2004	Elbasani	19	(4)
2004	AC Oulu	10	(6)
2005–2006	KuPS	37	(6)
2007–2008	OPS	23	(2)
2009–2011	VPS-j	19	(4)
2014	OPS	4	(0)

International career
1999	Ghana U17	17	
2001	Ghana U20		

Managerial career
- 2014–2015: OPS
- 2018–2020: FC Jazz
- 2022: Kotoku Royals
- * Club domestic league appearances and goals

Seth Ablade (born 30 April 1983) is a Ghanaian football manager and former player.

== Playing career ==
Ablade played in the premier divisions of Poland, Albania and Finland. He featured for Ghana in the 1999 Under-17 World Cup in New Zealand, winning a bronze medal.

== Coaching career ==
After his player career Ablade has worked as a manager for the Finnish sides OPS and FC Jazz.

== Personal life ==
He is the father of the footballer Terry Ablade.
