= Tom Strand =

Swedish football coach

Personal information
- Full name: Tom Marcus Christian Strand
- Date of birth: 1982 (age 43–44)
- Place of birth: Sweden

Managerial career
- Years: Team
- –2014: Golden Boot Academy (chairman)
- 2014: Bechem United
- 2015–2016: Medeama SC
- 2017–: Great Olympics

Tom Strand is a professional football coach from Sweden who is contracted to Great Olympics in Ghana as of 2017.

== Career ==
=== Bechem United ===
Signing a two-year contract to lead Bechem United in 2014, he was praised by the team CEO as perfect for the club due to his ‘training methods’ and ‘tactical ingenuity’ just a month after his arrival. During his time with the club, he stated that the ‘old’ officials presiding over the league matches as referees were culpable of bad calls and deliberately aggravating players. Following his departure from the club, he had relished for another spell at Bechem despite the fact he was already at Medeama SC by then.

=== Medeama and resignation crisis ===
In 2015, the Swede was announced as head coach of Medeama SC of the Ghanaian Premier League. The Ghanaian media spread rumors that Strand was going to sign for Hearts of Oak (while he was still with Medeama) which never happened even though they had sent a letter to Medeama regarding a possible appointment of him as their coach. But, in 2016, he decided abscond from his hotel in South Africa without notifying anyone one night, leaving a note explaining his resignation. Before that, the trainer had also missed multiple training sessions and two league games and technical director Augustine Evans Adotey supervised the squad in his place. It happened a day after his team lost to Mamelodi Sundowns in the CAF Confederation Cup play-offs. At once, he was reported to the South African police for his surreptitious behavior. By 10 May Strand had already returned to Sweden. Months later, he issued an apology for suddenly leaving the club in such an unscrupulous manner, citing familial financial problems as the reason for his exit. Still, he thought about a possible return to coach Medeama but the deal never happened. Medeama now want repayment from him for cancelling his contract before it expired and Interpol have given him a red notice alert.

=== Great Olympics ===
Succeeding Godwin Attram as head coach in April 2017, his main task was to lift the newly promoted side from the bottom of the table. This decision to appoint him as manager bewildered the supporters, who threatened to ‘chase him out’. By June 2017, Strand has expressed apprehension over the club being relegated.

One of his main ambitions is to lead the Ghana national team in the 2022 FIFA World Cup finals in Qatar.
