= Terry Ablade =

Finnish footballer (born 2001)

Personal information
- Date of birth: 12 October 2001 (age 25)
- Place of birth: Accra, Ghana
- Position: Striker

Team information
- Current team: OLS Oulu
- Number: 56

Senior career*
Years	Team	Apps	(Gls)
2017–2018	Jazz	20	(4)
2018–2025	Fulham	0	(0)
2022	→ AFC Wimbledon (loan)	12	(0)
2023–2024	→ Carlisle United (loan)	12	(0)
2024–2025	→ Partick Thistle (loan)	25	(2)
2026–	OLS Oulu	2	(1)

International career^{‡}
2018	Finland U17	3	(1)
2019	Finland U18	4	(1)
2019	Finland U19	4	(0)
2021–2022	Finland U21	5	(1)
- * Club domestic league appearances and goals as of 18:35, 9 October 2026 (UTC) ‡ National team caps and goals as of 14 October 2023

Terry Ablade (born 12 October 2001) is a professional footballer who plays as a striker for OLS Oulu. Born in Ghana, he has represented Finland at youth level.

== Early life ==
Ablade was born in Accra, Ghana, to Ghanaian parents, and he moved to Finland when he was seven years old. His father is the former footballer Seth Ablade.

== Club career ==
=== FC Jazz ===
Ablade began his playing career in Finland, where he was raised, with FC Jazz, debuting in the first team in Finnish third-tier Kakkonen in 2017.

=== Fulham ===
In July 2018, he moved to English club Fulham, signing his first two-year professional contract with the club a year later.

On 7 January 2022, he signed a new two-and-a-half-year deal with Fulham, before joining League One club AFC Wimbledon on loan until the end of the season.

He departed the club for a second loan spell in August 2023, joining Carlisle United. In November 2023 he suffered an injury, potentially ruling him out until February 2024.

On 23 August 2024, Ablade joined Scottish Championship club Partick Thistle on a season-long loan. A day later Ablade scored on his Thistle debut coming off the bench to equalise away to Falkirk in an eventual 2–1 defeat.

Ablade left Fulham at the expiry of his contract in June 2025.

== International career ==
Ablade is a Finnish youth international, representing them at under-17, under-19 and under-21 levels.

== Playing style ==
Ablade is known for his pace.

== Career statistics ==
As of 2 February 2025

Appearances and goals by club, season and competition
Club	Season	League			National cup (Note: Includes Suomen Cup, FA Cup, Scottish Cup)		League cup (Note: Includes EFL League Cup and Scottish League Cup)		Other		Total	
Club	Season	Division	Apps	Goals	Apps	Goals	Apps	Goals	Apps	Goals	Apps	Goals
Jazz	2017	Kakkonen	14	2	4	1	0	0	0	0	18	3
Jazz	2018	Kakkonen	6	2	0	0	0	0	0	0	6	2
Jazz	Total		20	4	4	1	0	0	0	0	24	5
Fulham	2018–19	Premier League	0	0	0	0	0	0	0	0	0	0
Fulham	2019–20	Championship	0	0	0	0	0	0	0	0	0	0
Fulham	2020–21	Premier League	0	0	0	0	0	0	3 (Note: Appearances in EFL Trophy)	0	3	0
Fulham	2021–22	Championship	0	0	0	0	0	0	0	0	0	0
Fulham	2022–23	Premier League	0	0	0	0	1	0	0	0	1	0
Fulham	Total		0	0	0	0	1	0	3	0	4	0
AFC Wimbledon (loan)	2021–22	League One	12	0	0	0	0	0	–		12	0
Carlisle United (loan)	2023–24	League One	12	0	1	0	0	0	3	0	16	0
Partick Thistle (loan)	2024–25	Scottish Championship	15	1	1	0	0	0	1 (Note: Appearance in the Scottish Challenge Cup)	0	17	1
Career total'			59	5	6	1	1	0	7	0	73	6
