= Philomon Baffour =

Ghanaian footballer

Personal information
- Date of birth: 6 February 2001 (age 25)
- Place of birth: Accra, Ghana
- Position: Right-back

Team information
- Current team: Dreams
- Number: 2

Youth career
- –2018: Dreams

Senior career*
Years	Team	Apps	(Gls)
2018–	Dreams	32	(0)

International career^{‡}
2021–	Ghana U20	6	(0)
- * Club domestic league appearances and goals as of 12 May 2021 ‡ National team caps and goals as of 6 March 2021

Philomon Baffour (born 6 February 2001) is a Ghanaian professional footballer who plays as a right-back for Ghanaian Premier league side Dreams FC and the Ghana National Team.

== Career ==
Baffour played the full 90 minutes in 3–0 win against West African Football Academy on 3 February 2021. He was part of the final 28-man squad named by Milovan Rajevac for the 2021 Africa Cup of Nations (AFCON) in Cameroon.
