= Osei Boateng =

Ghanaian footballer

Personal information
- Full name: Daniel Osei Boateng
- Date of birth: May 19, 1981 (age 45)
- Place of birth: Accra, Ghana
- Height: 1.90 m (6 ft 3 in)
- Position: Goalkeeper

Team information
- Current team: Liberty Professionals F.C.
- Number: 27

Senior career*
Years	Team	Apps	(Gls)
1999	Great Olympics	9	(0)
2000–2002	Asante Kotoko	36	(0)
2003	Heart of Lions	7	(0)
2004	Bofoakwa Tano	8	(0)
2004	Nuneaton Griff F.C.	2	(0)
2005–2010	King Faisal Babes	70	(0)
2010–	Liberty Professionals F.C.	2	(0)

International career
2001–2008	Ghana	1	(0)
- * Club domestic league appearances and goals

Daniel Osei Boateng (born 19 May 1981 in Accra) is a Ghanaian football player who, is playing for Liberty Professionals F.C.
