= Maxwell Arthur =

Ghanaian professional footballer (born 2000)

Maxwell Arthur (born 4 December 2000) is a Ghanaian professional footballer who plays as a defender for the Ghanaian Premier League side Dreams F.C.

== Club career ==
=== Dreams FC ===
==== 2016–2019 season ====
Arthur is a graduate of the Dreams FC youth academy. He was promoted to the senior team in May 2016, during the 2016 Ghanaian Premier League season. On 29 June 2016, he made his debut in a 2–0 win against New Edubiase United coming on in the 85th minute for Aaron Amoah. By the end of the season he played three matches. He featured 5 times during the GHALCA Top 8 competition helping the club lift their first ever top flight trophy. He became a key player in the squad during the 2018 Ghana Premier League season, featuring in 13 matches before the league was abandoned due to the dissolution of the GFA in June 2018, as a result of the Anas Number 12 Expose.

During the 2019 GFA Normalization Committee Special Competition, he played 10 league matches. During the 2019–20 Ghana Premier League, he played 9 matches and chipped in 1 assist, before the league was suspended due to the COVID-19 pandemic. He served as the club captain from 2019 to 2020.

==== 2020–21 season ====
On 21 August 2020, he signed a new two-year deal extending his contract until 2022. With the league set to restart for the 2020–21 Ghana Premier League season, he was named on the team's senior squad list as one of the key defensive forces for the club.

== International career ==
Arthur was a Ghana national under-20 football team member in 2018–2019. He was a member of the squad that played during the 2019 Africa U-20 Cup of Nations, featuring in 2 matches during the tournament. He served as the deputy captain that period to Ishaku Konda who served as captain.

He was also a member of the Ghana national under-23 football team in 2018–2019. He received call-ups for Africa U-23 Cup of Nations qualifiers ahead of the 2019 Africa U-23 Cup of Nations.
