= Mohammed Sulemana =

Ghanaian footballer

Personal information
- Full name: Mohammed Sulemana
- Date of birth: 13 December 2002 (age 23)
- Place of birth: Koforidua, Ghana
- Height: 1.71 m (5 ft 7 in)
- Positions: Left-back; left winger

Team information
- Current team: Rio Ave F.C

Senior career*
Years	Team	Apps	(Gls)
2016	Reform FC		
2018–2019	Bazuka FC		
2019–2022	→ Dreams F.C		
2022-	Rio Ave F.C.		

International career
2020–	Ghana U20	5	
- * Club domestic league appearances and goals

Mohammed Sulemana (born 13 December 2002) is a Ghanaian professional footballer who currently plays as a left back for Portugal side Rio Ave FC and the Ghana national under-20 football team.

== Career ==
Mohammed Sulemana began his professional career as a youth team player for Reform F.C at Koforidua in Ghana before moving on to Bazuka F.C in Nsawam, Ghana also as a youth team player, and subsequently became a first team player for Dreams F.C in 2019. Mohammed Sulemana then got a call-up the Ghana national under-20 football team in 2020.

Sulemana played the full 90 minutes in 3–0 win against West African Football Academy on 3 February 2021.
