= 2022–23 Ghana FA Cup =

43rd season of Ghana's primary cup competition

2022–23 MTN FA Cup

Tournament details
- Country: Ghana
- Teams: 110 (all)

The 2022–23 Ghana FA Cup was the 43rd season of the Ghana FA Cup, the primary knockout competition in Ghanaian football. Sponsored by MTN Ghana for the 13th straight season, thus called the "MTN FA Cup" for sponsorship purposes, Accra Hearts of Oak were the defending champions. Dreams FC won their first title since their formation in 2009 by beating King Faisal 2–0 and thus qualified for the following season's CAF Confederation Cup as Ghana's representative.

== Format ==
A total of 110 clubs consisting of 18 Premier League Clubs, 48 Division One League Clubs and 44 Division Two League Clubs from the Regional Football Associations would participate the competition.

The preliminary round stage of the cup would be played between the 48 Division One Clubs and 44 Division Two clubs totalling 92 clubs across the country. The Winners of the preliminary round will progress to the round of 64 where they would be drawn against the 18 Premier League clubs.

The winner of this season represented Ghana at the 2022–23 CAF Confederation Cup.

== Sponsorship ==
In June 2021, MTN renewed their sponsorship for the competition for three extra years with 4 million Ghana cedis with focus on the 2022 Ghanaian FA Cup. Star times also is set to contribute $200,000 as part of their full $1,000,000.00 for the entire 2021–22 football season for the second year of the sponsorship deal with the Ghana Football Association.

== Preliminary round ==
The draw for the preliminary round was made on 18 October 2022 and streamed live on youtube . Only second-tier and third-tier teams joined the round, as the Premier League teams received a bye from the round.

Tie	Home team (tier)	Score	Away team (tier)	Att.
1	Inalewale Catholic Stars (3)	6–2	Samba Stars (3)	
2	Kasalgu Arrow Heads (3)	6–2	Kunbung Binbiem (2)	
3	Steadfast FC (2)	2–0	Tamale Soccer Angels (3)	
4	Sheaga-A-Real Town (3)	1–2	STK Stars (3)	
5	Wa United FC (3)	1–3	Maana FC (2)	
6	Wa Suntaa Sporting Club (2)	2–0	Biyard 77 Stars FC (3)	
7	Debibi United FC (2)	2–1	Eleven Wonders (2)	
8	Baffour Soccer Academy (2)	2–0	Yeji Mist SC (3)	
9	Unity FC (2)	0–1	Wa Power SC (3)	
10	Kassena Nankana United FC (2)	1–0	Sunyani Reformers FC (3)	
11	Bofoakwa Tano FC (2)	3–0	Young Apostles FC (2)	
12	Brong Ahafo United (2)	2–0	Liberty Youth (3)	
13	Berekum Arsenal (2)	0–0(3–2 p)	Dumesua Delsanco FC (2)	
14	Brong Ahafo United (2)	2–0	Liberty Youth (3)	
15	Wamanafo Mighty Royals (2)	3–0	Nkoranza Warriors SC (2)	
16	Wa Yaasin Juniors (2)	0–1	Dormaa Unity SC (3)	
17	PAC Academy FC (2)	2–2(4–2 p)	Asokwa Deportivo FC (2)	
18	Future Stars (2)	0–0(9–10 p)	Asekem FC (2)	
19	Benab FC (3)	1–0	New Edubiase United (2)	
20	Nations FC (2)	2–0	Pacific Heroes FC (2)	
21	Soccer 4 Souls (2)	3–1	Kumawuman United (3)	
22	Pro Players Academy (3)	2–0	Jamera Soccer Professionals (3)	
23	Fijai SA (3)	1–0	Basake Holy Stars (2 )	
24	Nzema Kotoko FC (2)	3–0	Tarkwa Barcelona (3)	
25	Sefwi All Stars (2)	3–0	KKD Stars FC (3)	
26	Adidome Unity Stars FC (3)	2–1	Akatsi Kickers FC (3)	
27	Validus FC (3)	0–3	MŠK Žilina Africa FC (3)	
28	Vila Afrique FC (3)	0–0(4–5 p)	Adjoafuaman FC (3)	
29	Agbogba FC (3)	3–1	NADM FC(3)	

== See also ==
Official website
