= Nzema Kotoko F.C. =

Football team in Ghana

- Full name: Nzema Kotoko Football Club
- Nickname: Ye Dwazo
- Founded: 2013; 13 years ago
- Ground: Akoon park
- League: Division One League, Ghana

Nzema Kotoko Football Club is a Ghanaian professional football club based in Nzema in the Western Region of Ghana. The club currently competes in Zone Two of the Division One League which is the second tier of the football league system in Ghana, and the MTN FA Cup. They are rivals with city neighbours Karela United.

== History ==
The club was founded in 2013 and currently plays in the Ghana Division One League. In 2020, the club's top goal scorer, Agyenim Boateng Mensah was transferred to Dreams.

== Grounds ==
In February 2021, the club started playing the home matches at Akoon Park in Tarkwa, the home grounds of Ghana Premier League side Medeama.

== Support ==
=== Rivalries ===
Due being located in the Western Region of Ghana, the club's rivals is their neighbours Karela United (currently in the Ghana Premier League) which is also within the Nzema zone.
