= Abdul Jalilu =

Ghanaian professional footballer (born 2000)

Abdul Jalilu (born 10 June 2000) is a Ghanaian professional footballer who plays as a defender for Ghanaian Premier League side Dreams F.C. He was appointed as the deputy captain of the side in November 2020.

== Career ==
=== Dreams FC ===
==== Early career ====
A graduate of the Dreams FC youth team, Still Believe FC, Jalilu He was promoted to the senior team in late 2017, ahead of the 2018 Ghana Premier League season. He made his debut on 28 April 2018, playing the full 90 minutes in a 5–0 loss to West African Football Academy (WAFA). He only featured once before the league was abandoned due to the dissolution of the GFA in June 2018, as a result of the Anas' Number 12 Exposé.

He played 6 league matches during the 2019 GFA Normalization Committee Special Competition. During the 2019–20 Ghana Premier League, he played 11 matches, before the league was suspended due to the COVID-19 pandemic.

==== 2020–21 season ====
Ahead of the 2020–21 Ghana Premier League season, he was named on the team's senior squad list as the league was set to restart in November 2020. In November 2020, he was named as the new deputy club captain ahead of the season, along with Charles Lucio Osei deputising new captain Michael Agbekpornu. He was adjudged the man of the match after a goalless draw against International Allies on 16 November 2020.
