= Agyenim Boateng Mensah =

Ghanaian professional footballer

Agyenim Boateng
Personal information
- Full name: Agyenim Boateng Mensah
- Date of birth: 20 December 1996 (age 29)
- Height: 1.78 m (5 ft 10 in)
- Position: Striker

Team information
- Current team: Dreams

Senior career*
Years	Team	Apps	(Gls)
2018–2020	Nzema Kotoko	52	(38)
2020–	Dreams	117	(37)
- * Club domestic league appearances and goals

Agyenim Boateng Mensah (born 20 December 1996) is a Ghanaian professional footballer who plays as a forward for Ghanaian Premier League side Dreams F.C.

== Career ==
=== Nzema Kotoko ===
Mensah started his career with lower-tier side Nzema Kotoko. He featured for them in the Ghana Division One League. He was the leading goalscorer in the 2019–2020 season division one league scoring 10 goals in 13 matches prior to cancellation of the season due to the COVID-19 pandemic. During his time at the club, he scored 38 goals in 52 games played in all competitions.

=== Dreams FC ===
On 10 September 2020, he joined Ghana Premier League side, Dreams FC. He signed four-year deal to keep him at the club until 2024 after passing his mandatory medicals. He was named on the club's squad list for the 2020–21 Ghana Premier League season along with new attacking signings Joseph Esso and Abel Manomey to bolster their squad ahead of the season and was expected to form a formidable strike-partnership with the duo. He made his debut during match day one on 16 November 2020 in a goalless draw to International Allies. On 24 January 2020, he scored his debut goal in the 37th minute with an assist from Farhadu Suleiman and scored another in the 73rd minute with an assist from Mohammed Sulemana respectively to end the match with a brace during a 4–1 victory over Liberty Professionals.
