= Vladislav Virić =

Serbian footballer (born 1979)

Personal information
- Date of birth: 11 April 1979 (age 47)
- Place of birth: Titovo Užice, SR Serbia, SFR Yugoslavia
- Height: 1.83 m (6 ft 0 in)
- Position: Midfielder

Senior career*
Years	Team	Apps	(Gls)
2001–2002	Radnički Kragujevac	1	(0)
2002	Kolubara	16	(3)
2003–2004	Sloboda Užice	5	(0)
2004–2005	Metalac Gornji Milanovac	37	(9)
2005–2006	Sevojno	27	(8)
2006–2007	Sloboda Užice	53	(13)
2007	Sevojno	25	(5)
2007–2008	Panthrakikos		
2008–2009	Sloboda Užice	11	(1)
2009	Sevojno	11	(1)
2009–2010	Sevojno	42	(4)
2010–2011	Mash'al Mubarek	8	(0)
2011–2012	OPS	34	(2)
2012–2013	Jedinstvo Užice	17	(0)
Total		287	(46)

Managerial career
- 2020–2022: Dreams
- * Club domestic league appearances and goals

Vladislav Virić (Serbian Cyrillic: Владислав Вирић, born 11 April 1979) is a Serbian professional football manager and former player who most recently coached Ghana Premier League club Dreams FC.

== Coaching career ==
=== Dreams FC ===
In January 2021, Ghanaian club Dreams FC announced the appointment of Virić as their new head coach. As of his appointment the club were trailing in the 16th position with a poor record of one win, three draws, and three defeats whilst in the relegation zone of the Ghana Premier League standings with just six points.

In the month of February he led the club to 3 wins, 1 draw and a lose, leading them to a top four position at the end of the month. He was nominated for the Ghana Premier League coach of the month for February based on that performance. He later beat off competition from Medeama SC coach's Samuel Boadu, who had also led his team to the same feat in February and Berekum Chelsea’s Abu Abdul-Hanan to win the award. At the end of the season, he led the club to a 7th-place finish. On 8 February 2022, he mutually parted ways with Dreams, with one match to end the first round of the 2021–22 Ghana Premier League season.

== Honours ==
- Ghana Premier League Coach of the Month: February 2021
