= Christopher Ennin =

Ghanaian football manager (born 1982)

Personal information
- Date of birth: 22 April 1982 (age 44)
- Place of birth: Ghana
- Position: Goalkeeper

Senior career*
Years	Team	Apps	(Gls)
- Super Power Samut Prakan FC

Managerial career
- Sakaeo FC
- 2019–2020: Denver Sundowns FC
- 2020–2022: Mbabane Swallows FC
- 2022–2024: Berekum Chelsea FC
- 2024–: Moneni Pirates FC
- * Club domestic league appearances and goals

Christopher Ennin (born 22 April 1982) is a Ghanaian football manager who manages Moneni Pirates FC.

== Life and career ==
Ennin was born on 22 April 1982 in Ghana. He attended the University of Cape Coast in Ghana. He studied commerce. He operated as a goalkeeper. He played for Thai side Super Power Samut Prakan FC. He obtained a CAF A License. He has been regarded to prefer the 4-3-3 formation. He managed Thai side Sakaeo FC. In 2019, he was appointed manager of Swazi side Denver Sundowns FC.

In 2020, he was appointed manager of Swazi side Mbabane Swallows FC. He was tasked with helping the club achieve qualification for the CAF Champions League. In 2022, he was appointed manager of Ghanaian side Berekum Chelsea FC. He was regarded as one of the most tactical managers in the Ghanaian top flight while managing the club. In 2024, he was appointed manager of Swazi side Moneni Pirates FC.
