= Abel Manomey =

Ghanaian professional footballer

Personal information
- Date of birth: 6 July 1991 (age 35)
- Place of birth: Ghana
- Position: Forward

Youth career
- 2012–2013: Hearts of Oak

Senior career*
Years	Team	Apps	(Gls)
2016–2017	Kotoku Royals	27	(13)
2017–2019	Great Olympics	10	(5)
2020–2021	Dreams	9	(0)
- * Club domestic league appearances and goals as of 20:58, 23 November 2021 (UTC)

Abel Manomey (born 6 July 1991) is a Ghanaian professional footballer who last played as a forward for Ghanaian Premier League side Dreams F.C. He previously featured for the Accra Hearts of Oak and Accra Great Olympics. Born in Accra, Manomey is known for advocating for footballers to start planning their life after football due to the inconsistencies in playing football in Africa and specifically locally in Ghana.

He is known for being of one of the Ghanaian professional footballers to hold a bachelor's and master's degree. Due to that has been advocating for other professional footballers to enroll into the universities and earn education alongside their football careers.

== Early life and education ==
Manomey was born in Accra on 6 July 1991. He is a native of Peki, Adzokoe where both his parents come from. He had his basic school education at Christ Mission School in Kwashieman. He had his secondary school education at St. Thomas Aquinas Senior High School completing in 2005. After completing his secondary school education he moved to Mount Mary College of Education in Somanya to pursue a diploma in Education. He later moved to University of Education, Winneba to pursue a Bachelor of Science in Health Physical Education Recreation and Sports. He later went back to pursue a Master of Philosophy (MPhil) in Health Physical Education Recreation and Sports at the same university completing in 2020. Whilst studying at UEW, he was drafted in the school's football team.

== Club career ==
=== Accra Hearts of Oak ===
Manomey played colts football in Ghana before securing a move to Ghanaian giants Accra Hearts of Oak. He joined Accra Hearts of Oak on a two-year contract in 2012. He played for the club's reserves but later he quit and went back to school pursue his education.

=== Kotoku Royals ===
Whilst pursuing his first degree at University of Education, Winneba, he joined lower-tier side Kotoku Royals in 2016 whilst they were playing in the Division One League Zone B. He played 21 league matches and scored 13 goals, scoring a goal in the club's final match against his future club Great Olympics in a match which ended in a 2–1 loss to Kotoku Royals. His performance against the club triggered the club management's interest in signing him in 2017.

=== Great Olympics ===
Manomey joined Accra Great Olympics in January 2017, ahead of the 2017 Ghana Premier League season. On 18 February 2017, he scored his debut premier league goal against Ashanti Gold SC, scoring the consolation goal in a 3–1 loss to Olympics. He played 10 matches and scored 5 goals but he picked up an injury ahead of a match against Wa All Stars, which left him on the sidelines for the rest of the season. The club was relegated from the league at the end of the season, but he still remained as the club's top scorer. He returned to the club to feature for them in the Ghana Division One League serving as the club captain at a point in time.

=== Dreams FC ===
Manomey joined Ghanaian club Dreams FC in April 2020. He signed a two-year deal with the Accra-based side after passing his mandatory medical check up. He was later named on the club's squad list for the 2020–21 Ghana Premier League season. On 16 November 2020, he made his debut, coming on in the 72nd minute for Ali Huzaif in a goalless draw against International Allies.

== College career ==
Manomey played for the University of Education, Winneba (UEW) football team on both occasions whilst studying for his degree and masters. He played a critical role in the team's performances in the GUSA (Ghana Universities Sports Association) games. He was the top scorer of the GUSA 2020 games hosted by the University of Ghana, Legon after scoring 10 goals in 10 matches. He holds all-time top scorer record in the university games GUSA with 39 goals from 35 games in six tournaments.

== Personal life ==
Manomey had a child with his wife in early 2020. He is a Christian who worships as a Roman Catholic. He has an elder brother who is a Roman Catholic priest, Rev. Fr. Jerry Manomey.
