= Accra Lions FC =

Soccer club

Accra Lions FC (ALFC)
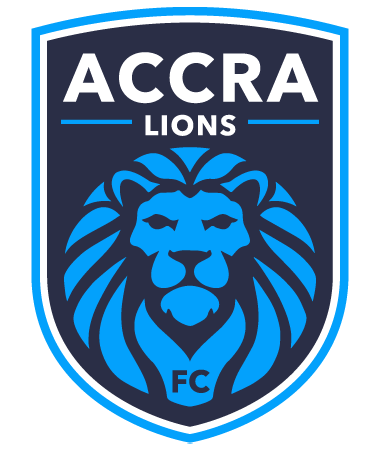
- Full name: Accra Lions Football Club
- Founded: 12 December 2015; 10 years ago
- Ground: Accra Sports Stadium; Accra, Greater Accra, Ghana
- Capacity: 40,000
- Owner(s): Lothar Matthäus; Frank Acheampong; Oliver König
- Chairman: Oliver König
- Coach: James Francis
- League: Ghana Premier League
- 2023–24: 2nd of 18 teams
- Website: www.accralions.com
Home colours	Away colours

Accra Lions Football Club is a football club based in East Legon, Accra, Ghana. The club competes in the Ghana Premier League, the top division of the Ghanaian soccer league system, and in the Ghanaian FA Cup. It plays its home matches at the Accra Sports Stadium.

== History ==
Accra Lions Football Club was founded on 12 December 2015.

It secure promotion after 2 seasons in the Greater Accra Division 2 after winning the Zone IV division with a record 73 points in 28 matches to qualify for the middle league.

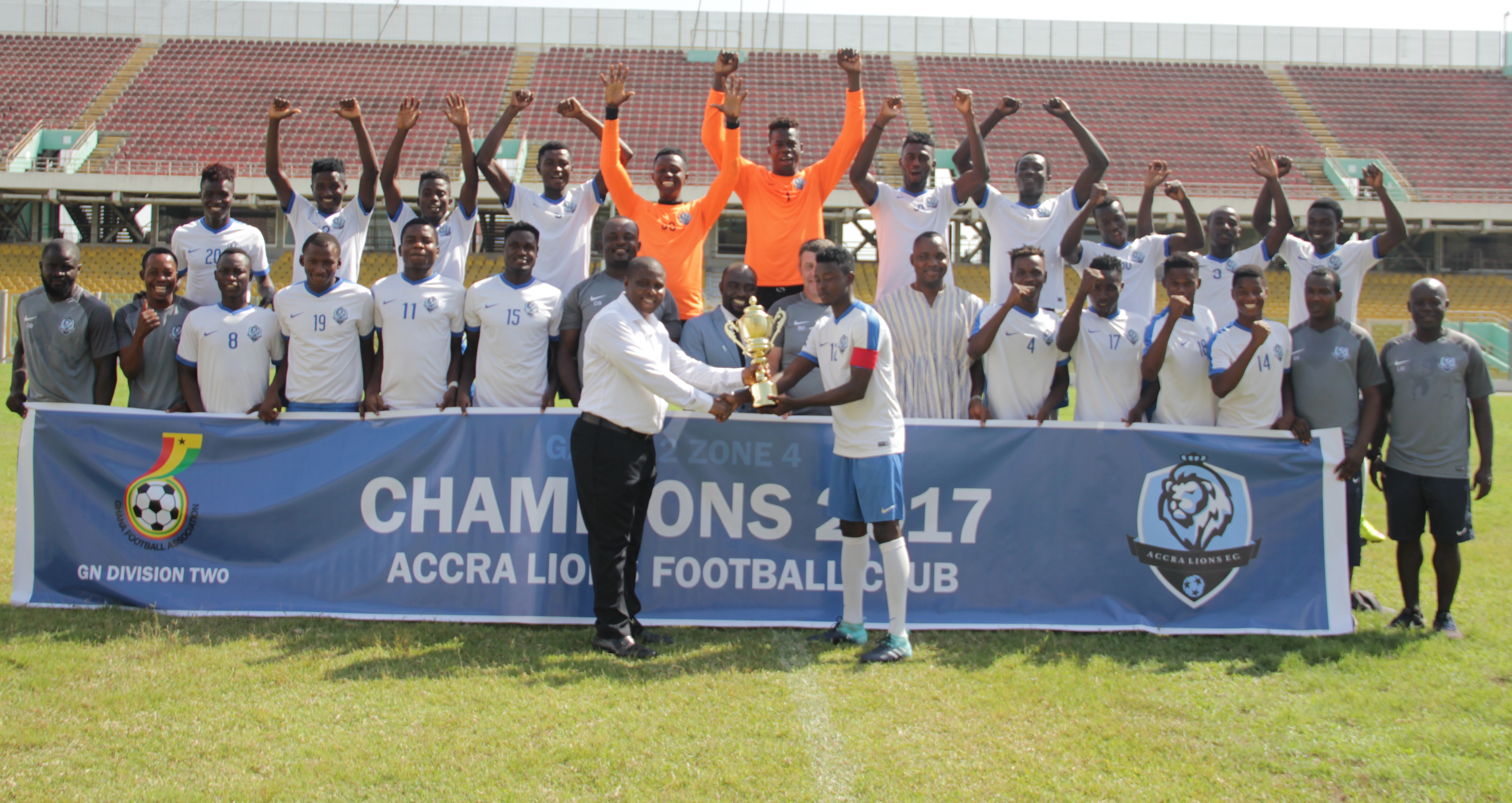
Accra Lions FC - Champions 2017

During the Greater Accra promotional playoffs at the Tema Sports Stadium, Accra Lions booked the sole qualification ticket with a 100% winning record. It beat Emmanuel FC (4–1), R-Stakes (3–0) and Photizo Future Professionals (2–0) to slot into Division 1 Zone III which includes clubs based in Greater Accra, Eastern Region and Volta Region.

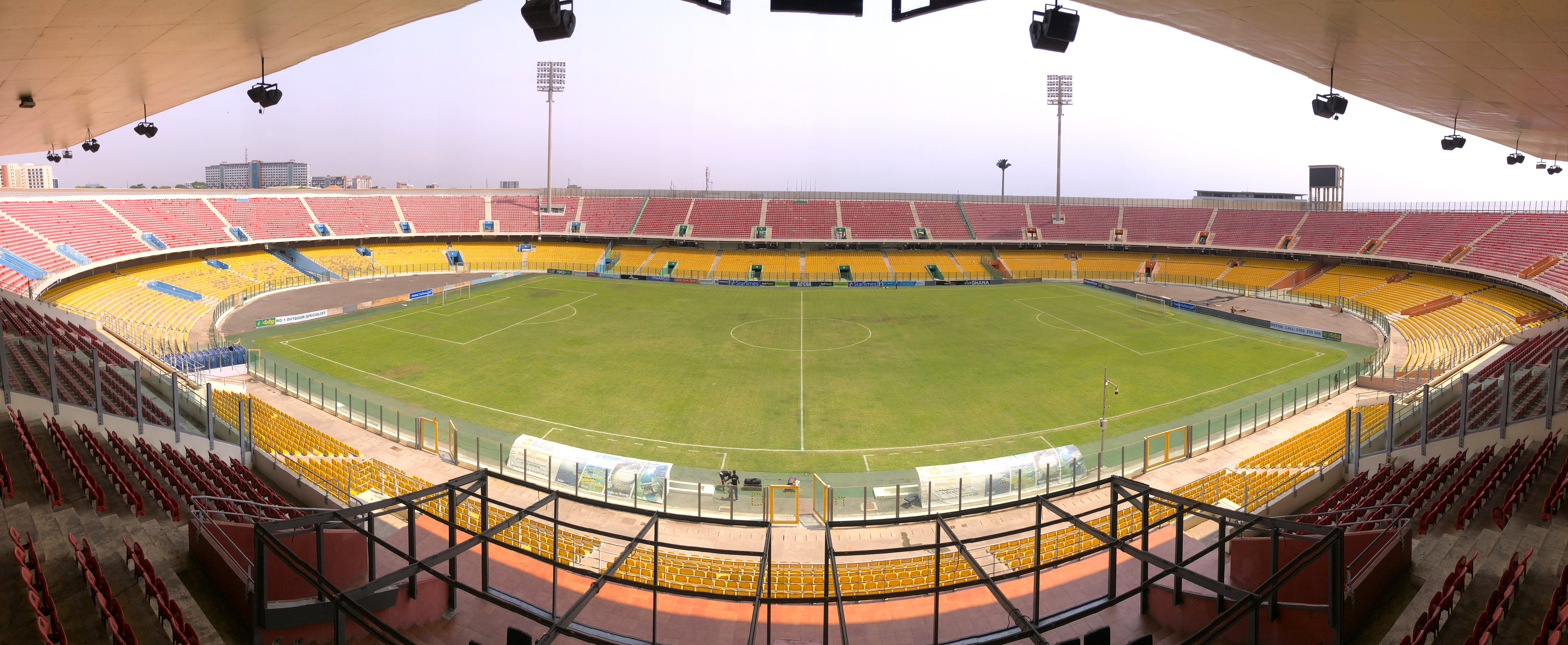
Accra Sports Stadium

On 28 January 2018, Accra Lions officially announced the Accra Sports Stadium as its new home ground for the 2017/2018 Division 1 League.

In 2018 it made its debut in the Ghana Division 1- Zone 3 and in the Ghanaian FA Cup.

After becoming champions in the Ghana Division One 2020/2021, Accra Lions earned promotion to the Ghana Premier League. It scored the most goals (57 goals in 28 matches) and the club's striker Rauf Salifu ended up as top scorer in this seasons Division 1 with 21 goals.

In the FIFA Global Transfer Report 2021, Accra Lions ranked 7th in Africa ( CAF ) with 10 outgoing transfers. The following year it was able to transfer 10 players abroad.

On 23 May 2023, Accra Lions officially announced that former German international, World Cup Winner and FIFA World Player of the Year, Lothar Matthäus has joined Accra Lions Soccer Club as board member and shareholder.

Accra Lions finished the Ghana Premier League season 2023/2024 as runners-up. They reached second place (out of 18 teams) with the youngest first division team in the world. On matchday 7 against Bofoakwa Tano they played with an average age of 18.09 years. Throughout the whole season it was the youngest squad that ever played in the Ghana Premier League.

The Accra Lions set a particular focus on the development of young footballers. As one of the youngest professional teams in the world, the club regularly competes in Ghana's Division One League with a squad average age of under 17. The development and progression of young talent is one of the club's main priorities.

In September and October 2023, the club's under-18 side undertook a tour of Serbia. They first recorded a 3–0 victory against the under-19 team of Serbian top-flight club FK Čukarički, followed by a 5–0 win against the under-19 side of Red Star Belgrade.

In July 2026, Accra Lions' under-19 side undertook a three-week pre-season tour of Germany and Sweden. The team faced the under-19 and under-21 sides of Eintracht Frankfurt, as well as the senior professional teams of IFK Norrköping and IK Sirius.

The team won three of its four matches. A 3–1 victory over Eintracht Frankfurt's under-19 side was followed by a 4–1 win against the club's under-21 team and a 3–2 victory over IFK Norrköping. Accra Lions lost the final match against IK Sirius 1–0, conceding in stoppage time.

The starting eleven in Germany and Sweden had an average age of 16.9 years. With three victories, the young team gained international experience and achieved several positive results against established European opposition.

== Staff and players ==
Head coach

- (England) James Francis

General manager

- (Ghana) Ishmael Hamidu

Director of finance & administration

- (Ghana) Enoch Kofi Osei

Assistant coach

- (Ghana) Richard Afoakwa

Assistant coach

- (Germany) Johannes Pieper

Goalkeeper's coach

- (Ghana) Osei Boateng

Team Doctor

- (Ghana) Dr. Emmanuel Mensah

Physiotherapist

- (Ghana) Matthew Yartey

=== Squad ===
As of 29 October 2026

No.	Nat.	Name	Date of birth
Goalkeepers
1	(Ghana)	Frank Asumah	09.12.2008
22	(Ghana)	Godfred Titi	02.04.2010
33	(Ghana)	Caleb Gattor	29.07.2010
Defence
5	(Ghana)	Richard Agyen	25.07.2007
3	(Ghana)	Kelvin Lukuman Henyo	15.08.2010
4	(Ghana)	Kassim Hamzata	06.02.2010
12	(Ghana)	Isaac Mensah Lavoe	22.05.2010
24	(Ghana)	Rafiq Osman	28.04.2010
25	(Ghana)	David Boamah	06.06.2009
23	(Ghana)	Gilbert Kyei Baffour	19.03.2009
35	(Ghana)	Kwarteng Afum	05.09.2009
2	(Ghana)	Emmanuel Doku	05.05.2008
14	(Ghana)	Felix Amofa	25.06.2007
Midfield
6	(Ghana)	Oula Edem Kumah	18.12.2008
15	(Ghana)	Prince Andzie	07.06.2008
16	(Ghana)	Kelson Ofosu Antwi	11.12.2008
28	(Ghana)	Sajoe Kamara	08.02.2009
8	(Ghana)	Kweku Opare-Adu	21.08.2009
20	(Ghana)	Solomon Ayisu Nkrumah	07.07.2010
30	(Ghana)	Nasir Salihu	22.11.2009
34	(Ghana)	Lamine Mohammed	09.03.2010
Forwards
7	(Ghana)	Prince Ansah	24.05.2010
11	(Ghana)	Jeff Dakpo	24.09.2009
37	(Ghana)	Musah Gado	26.09.2009
17	(Ghana)	Zaidudeen Abdul Wahab	03.04.2009
18	(Ghana)	Isaac Yawson	26.03.2009
27	(Ghana)	Jonathan Nditsi	07.07.2010
10	(Mali)	Abdoulaye Diarra	06.01.2006
9	(Ghana)	Emmanuel Oduro	17.09.2009
13	(Ghana)	Chris Folivi	20.08.2010
19	(Cameroon)	Christian Bolonjo	16.10.2007
29	(Ghana)	Bashiru Mohammed	20.03.2009
39	(Ghana)	Martin Quarcoo	26.12.2009

=== Former Players ===
- (Ghana) Osman Bukari
- (Ghana) Rahim Ibrahim
- (Ghana) David Oduro
- (Senegal) Olivier Boissy
- (Cameroon) Jessie Guera Djou
- (Ghana) Joseph Amoah
- (Ghana) Alex Agyarkwa
- (Ghana) Ezekiel Alladoh

== Crest ==
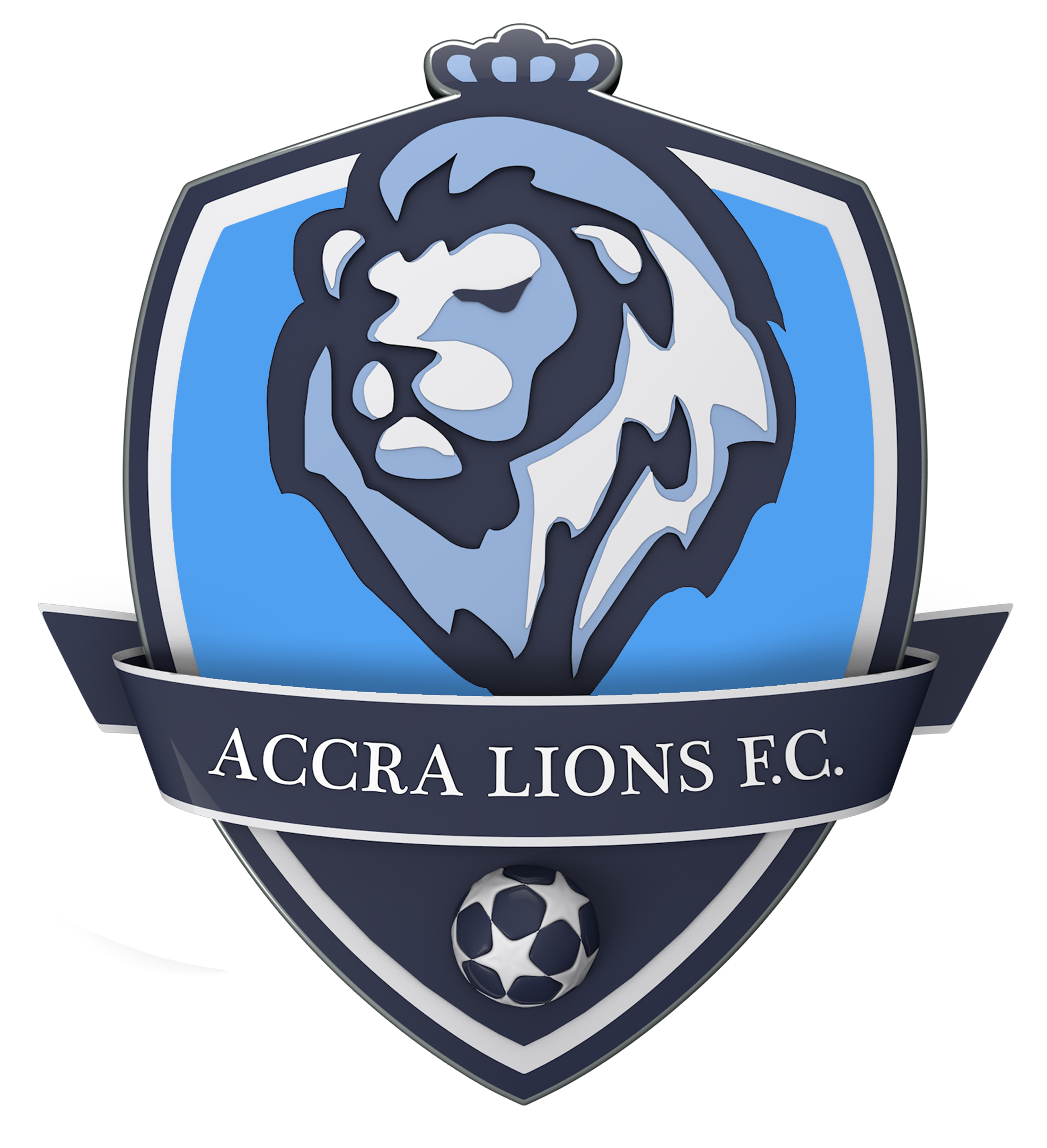
2015–2024

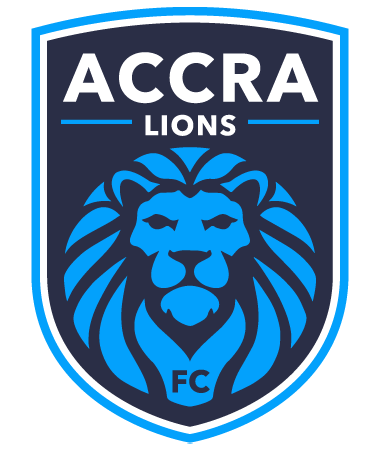
2024–present
