= Abdul-Karim Zito =

Ghanaian football coach and a former professional footballer

Abdul-Karim Zito is a Ghanaian professional football manager and former player who is the technical director of Ghana Premier League club Ashanti Gold. He was previously manager of fellow league clubs Asante Kotoko, Medeama S.C. and Dreams F.C. and also coached the Ghana national under-20 football team.

== Coaching career ==
On 14 January 2020, he was named the coach of the Ghana national under-20 football team by the Ghana Football Association.
