= Kotoku Royals F.C. =

- Full name: Kotoku Royals Football Club
- Nickname: The Royals
- Founded: 2003
- Ground: Akim Oda Stadium, Akim Oda
- Capacity: 3,000
- Chairman: Linford Asamoah Boadu
- Manager: Vacant
- League: Ghana Division One

Kotoku Royals F.C. (previously known as Kotoku Royals Academy) is a professional football team from Akim Oda, Eastern Region in Ghana, currently playing in Ghana Division One. Founded in 2003 and given permission to play professional matches in 2005, the club made successive promotions through the Ghana League system to their current place in Division One.

In March, 2017 Englishman Matt Ward was appointed Head Coach for two years. but the coach left after just three months.

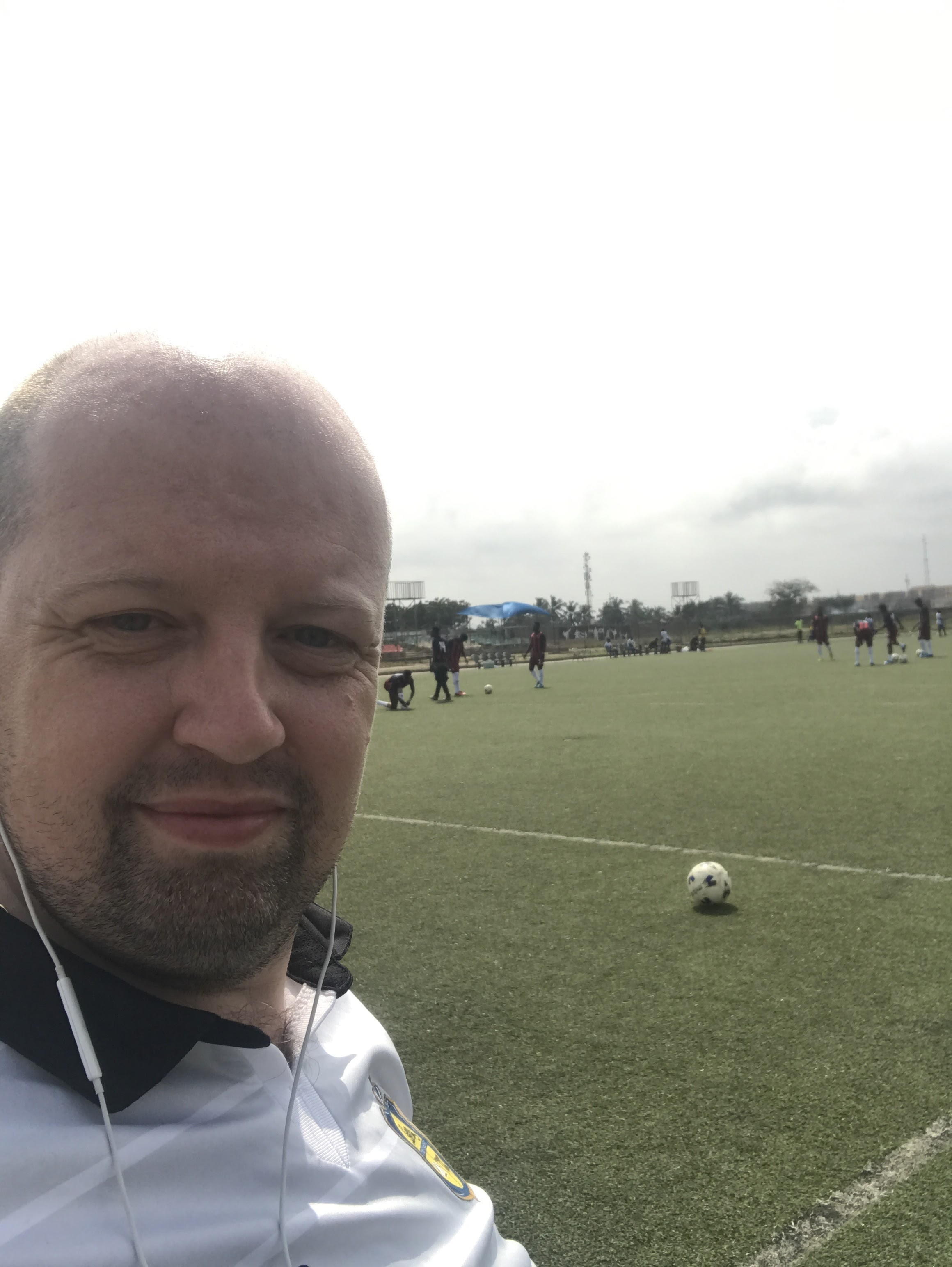
Training with Kotoku Royals

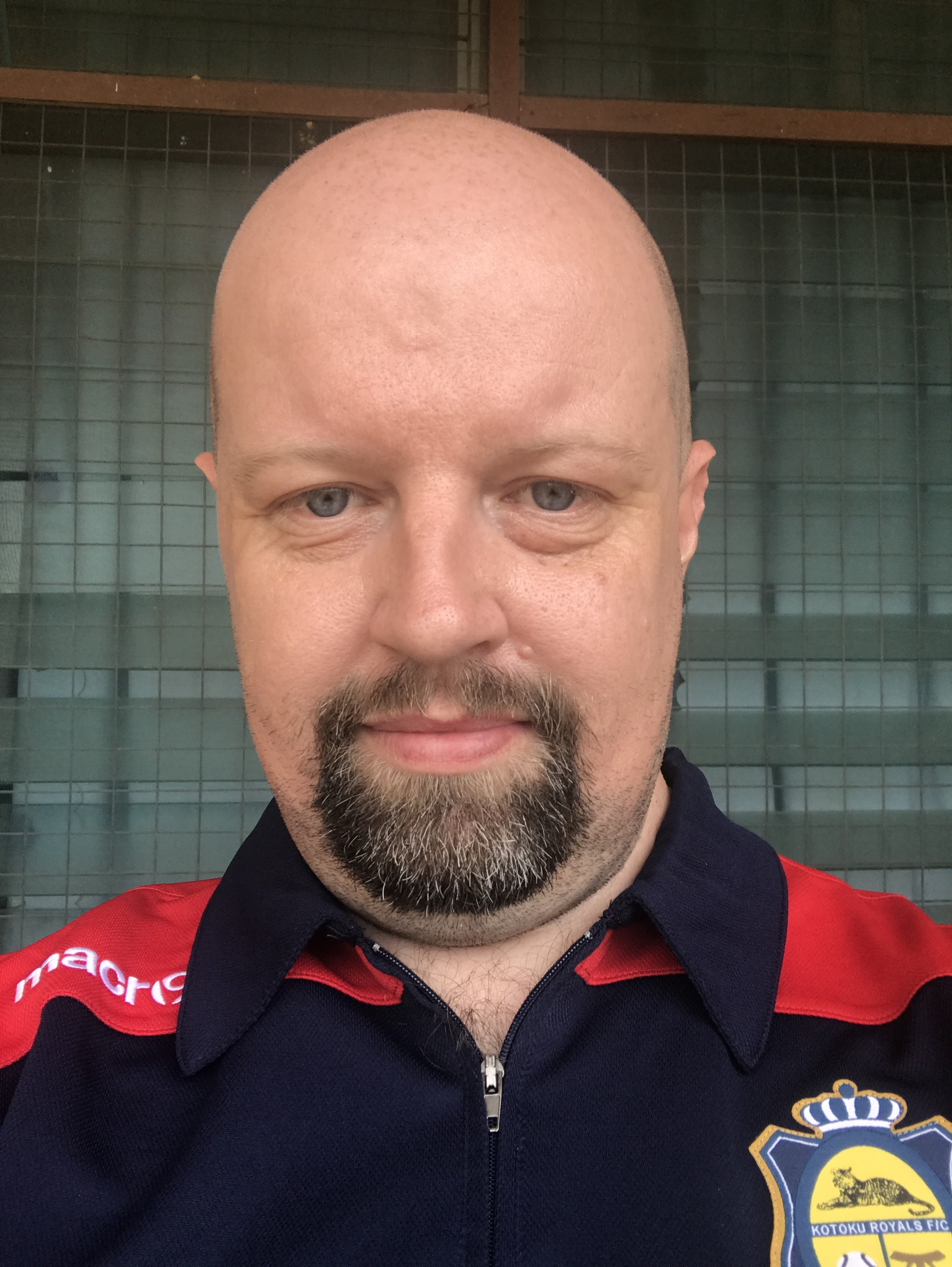
Training with Kotoku Royals

In August 2017, Englishman Anthony Savage was appointed as head coach. He led the club to a 4th place finish in Division One but left after disagreements with not being paid.

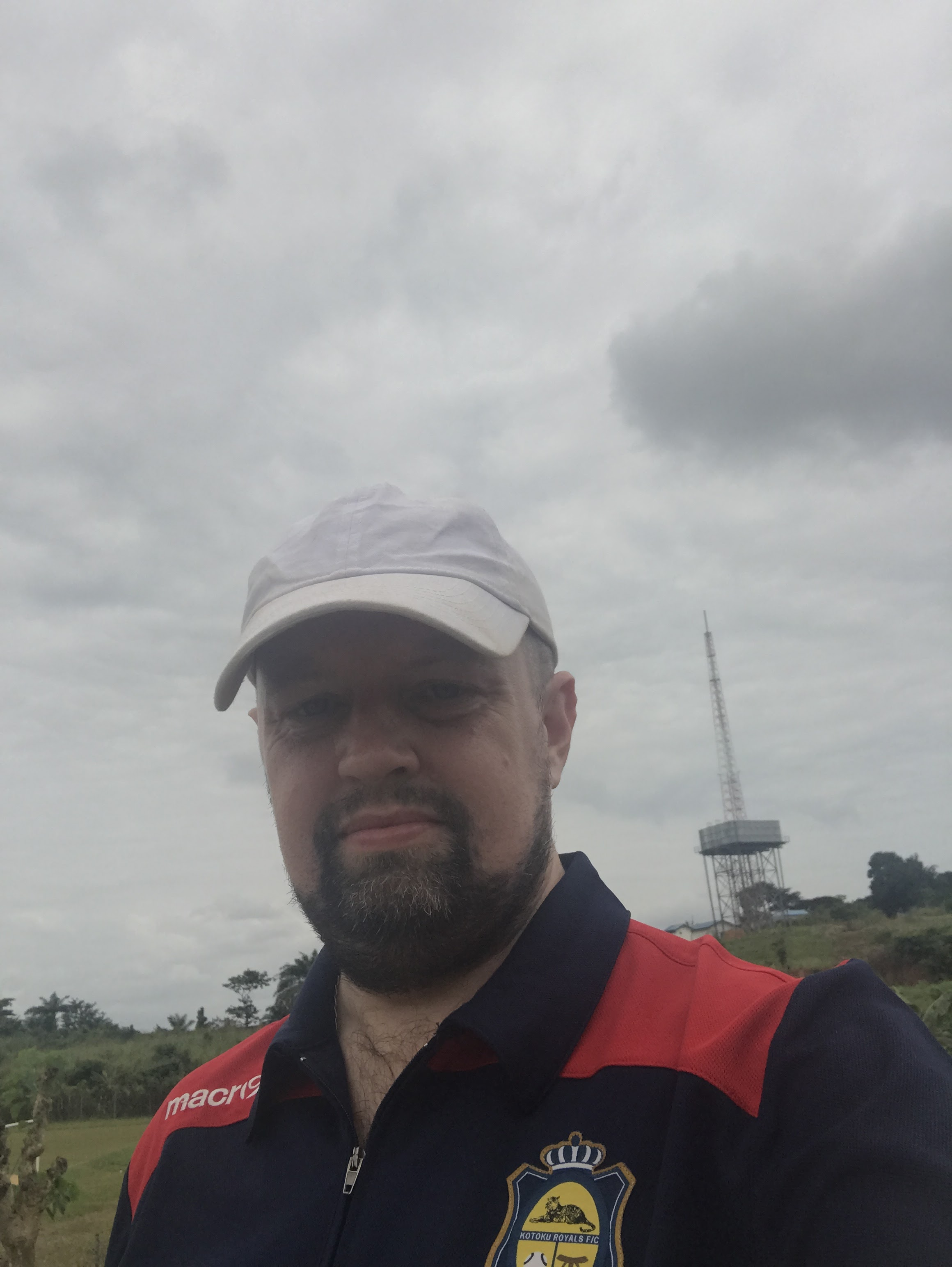
Training with Kotoku Royals
