= 2020–21 Ghana Premier League =

65th season of top professional association football league in Ghana

Ghana Premier League
- Season: 2020–21
- Dates: 14 November 2020 — 18 July 2021
- Country: (Ghana) (18 teams)
- Champions: Accra Hearts of Oak
- Relegated: Ebusua Dwarfs; Liberty Professionals; Inter Allies
- Champions League: Hearts of Oak
- Matches: 306
- Goals: 694 (2.27 per match)
- Top goalscorer: (18 goals); Diawisie Taylor
- Biggest home win: Ashanti Gold 7–0 Inter Allies (18 July 2021)
- Biggest away win: Liberty 1–5 Ashanti Gold (24 June 2021)
- Highest scoring: WAFA 5–4 Medeama (3 January 2021)
- Longest winning run: (5 games); Hearts of Oak
- Longest unbeaten run: (11 games); Hearts of Oak
- Longest winless run: (7 games); International Allies
- Longest losing run: (7 games); International Allies
- All statistics correct as of 18 June 2021. Live matches on StarTimes

The 2020–21 Ghana Premier League is the 65th season of top professional association football league in Ghana. The season started on 14 November 2020. 18 teams were competing in the league with each club playing each other twice, home and away, with the three clubs at the bottom of the league relegated to the Division One League. Hearts of Oak became champion for the first time in twelve years.

== Season overview ==
With 18 clubs participating in the league, this marked the second time since 1980 that more than 16 clubs competed in the top division of Ghanaian football. The GFA announced that the league was suspended on 15 March 2020, in the middle of match-week 15, because of the global COVID-19 pandemic. On 31 May, the league was further suspended until at least 31 June. On 30 June, the FA had a meeting and cancelled the league due to the COVID-19 pandemic. A meeting was held on 27 August 2020 to determine the start and logistics of the 2020–21 season.

The Ghana Football Association (GFA), on Friday, 5 November 2020 launched the 65th Ghana Premier League season and other products of the Association, ie, Division One League, Women's Premier League and the MTN FA Cup. The launch took place in the studio of broadcast partner StarTimes, and broadcast live on StarTimes Adepa Channel 247 and Max TV.

Due to the COVID-19 pandemic on 22 October 2020, The Ghana Football Association (GFA) began testing of players, coaching staff, and officials of the 18 Premier League clubs.

The Ghana Football Association chairman announced the prize money for winning the league: "The winner of the 2020/21 Premier League will earn GHC 250,000 in prize money. The prize money is an increase from the GHc 180,000 received by the last winner of the Ghana Premier League Aduana Stars in the 2016/17 season."

== Prize money ==
- The club that placed first in the league season would earn a trophy along with a cash prize of GHC 250,000, 40 gold medals and Ghc 10,000 worth of groceries from Melcom Shopping Center.
- The club that placed second in the league season would receive GHC 150,000 and 40 silver medals and groceries from Melcom Shopping Center.
- The club that placed third in the league season would earn an amount of GHC 80,000 and 40 bronze medals.

== Challenges ==
=== COVID-19 ===
The opening game between Hearts of Oak and Aduana Stars was postponed after a number of players tested positive for COVID-19. 16 teams went for COVID-19 testing.

The game between Liberty Professionals and Bechem United was also postponed due to the COVID-19 pandemic.

== Teams ==
The 2020-2021 Ghana Premier League season has seen an increase in the number of clubs from 16 to 18 clubs. The Accra Sports Stadium would be home to five Premier League Clubs, they are Hearts of Oak, Asante Kotoko, Legon Cities, Great Olympics and Inter Allies.

Location of the 2020–21 Ghanaian Premier League teams

=== Stadiums and locations ===
Note: Table is in alphabetical order.

Team	Location	Venue	Capacity
Aduana Stars	Dormaa Ahenkro	Agyeman Badu Stadium	7,000
Asante Kotoko	Accra	Accra Sports Stadium	40,000
Ashanti Gold	Obuasi	Len Clay Stadium	20,000
Bechem United	Bechem	Nana Gyeabour's Park	5,000
Berekum Chelsea	Berekum	Golden City Sports Stadium	5,000
Dreams	Dawu	Theatre of Dreams Sports Stadium	5,000
Ebusua Dwarfs	Cape Coast	Cape Coast Sports Stadium	15,000
Eleven Wonders	Techiman	Ohene Ameyaw Stadium	2,000
Elmina Sharks	Elmina	Nduom Sports Stadium	5,000
Great Olympics	Accra	Accra Sports Stadium	40,000
Hearts of Oak	Accra	Accra Sports Stadium	40,000
Inter Allies	Accra	Theatre of Dreams Sports Stadium	40,000
Karela United	Aiyinase	CAM Stadium	5000
King Faisal	Techiman	Ohene Ameyaw Park	10,000
Legon Cities	Accra	Accra Sports Stadium	40,000
Liberty Professionals	Dansoman	Carl Reindorf Park	2000
Medeama	Tarkwa	TNA Park	12,000
WAFA	Sogakope	Red Bull Arena	1,000

=== Club managers and captains ===
The table lists club managers.

Team	Manager	Captain
Aduana Stars	(Ghana) Asare Bediako	(Ghana) Joseph Addo
Asante Kotoko	(Portugal) Mariano Barreto	(Ghana) Felix Annan
Ashanti Gold	(France) Romain Folz	(Ghana) Amos Addai
Bechem United	(Ghana) Mingle Ocansey Kasim	(Ghana) Moro Salifu
Berekum Chelsea	(Ghana) Seth Hoffman	(Ghana) Stephen Amankona
Dreams	(Serbia) Vladislav Virić	(Ghana) Michael Agbekpornu
Ebusua Dwarfs	(Ghana) James Kuuku Dadzie	(Ghana) Dennis Korsah
Eleven Wonders	(Ghana) Ignatius Osei-Fosu	(Ghana) Simms Kwayie
Elmina Sharks	(Ghana) Joachim Yaw Acheampong	(Ghana) Ishmael Hammond
Great Olympics	(Ghana) Annor Walker	(Ghana) Gladson Awako
Hearts of Oak	(Ghana) Samuel Boadu	(Ghana) Abdul Fatawu Mohammed
Inter Allies	(Denmark) Henrik Peters Lehm	(Ghana) Hashmin Musah
Karela United	(Ghana) Evans Adotey	(Ghana) Godfred Agyemang Yeboah
King Faisal	(Serbia) Slaviša Božičić	(Ghana) Michael Akuffo
Legon Cities	(Ghana) Bashir Hayford	(Ghana) Fatau Dauda
Liberty Professionals	(Ghana) Andy Sinason (co-interim) (Ghana) Sellas Tetteh	(Ghana) Shaibu Ganiu (Ghana) George William Ansong
Medeama	(Ghana) Yaw Preko	(Ghana) Joseph Tetteh Zutah
WAFA	(Ghana) Prosper Nartey Ogum	(Ghana) Ibrahim Abukari

=== Managerial changes ===
Team	Outgoing manager	Manner of departure	Date of vacancy	Replaced by	Date of appointment	Table
Legon Cities	Goran Barjaktarević	Sacked	21 November 2020	Bashir Hayford	25 November 2020	18th
Asante Kotoko	Maxwell Konadu	Sacked	18 December 2020	Johnson Smith (interim manager)	18 December 2020	6th
Asante Kotoko	Johnson Smith (interim manager)	End of interim basis	26 March 2021	Mariano Barreto	26 March 2021	6th
Hearts of Oak	Edward Odum	Re-assigned to the youth team	December 2019	Kosta Papic	2 December 2020	11th
Hearts of Oak	Kosta Papic	Resigned	15 February 2021	Samuel Boadu	2 March 2021	11th
Dreams FC	Winfred Dormon	Re-assigned as assistant coach	8 January 2021	Vladislav Virić	8 January 2021	16th
Berekum Chelsea	Michael Hesse Odamtten	Sacked	9 January 2021	Seth Hoffman	13 January 2021	15th
Ashanti Gold	Milovan Cirkovic	Mutual consent	23 February 2021	Romain Folz	31 March 2021	7th
Medeama SC	Samuel Boadu	Resigned	25 February 2021	Yaw Preko	3 March 2021	3rd
Aduana Stars	Samuel Paa Kwesi Fabin	End of contract	27 February 2021	Asare Bediako	1 March 2021	8th
Bechem United	Ernest Danso	Mutual consent	25 March 2021	Mingle Ocansey Kasim	25 March 2021	8th
Liberty Professionals	David Ocloo	Sacked	21 April 2021	Andy Sinason Sellas Tetteh	21 April 2021	17th
Ebusua Dwarfs	Ernest Thompson-Quartey	Resigned	13 June 2021	James Kuuku Dadzie	15 June 2021	12th

== League table ==
Pos	Team	Pld	W	D	L	GF	GA	GD	Pts	Promotion or relegation
1	Hearts of Oak (C, Q)	34	17	10	7	45	23	+22	61	2021–22 CAF Champions League
2	Asante Kotoko	34	15	12	7	37	22	+15	57	
3	WAFA	34	16	8	10	46	38	+8	56	
4	Aduana Stars	34	16	7	11	44	42	+2	55	
5	Medeama	34	15	9	10	38	34	+4	54	
6	Great Olympics	34	15	7	12	37	33	+4	52	
7	Dreams	34	13	10	11	45	35	+10	49	
8	Karela United	34	12	10	12	42	41	+1	46	
9	Ashanti Gold	34	11	12	11	50	36	+14	45	
10	Berekum Chelsea	34	12	7	15	38	46	−8	43	
11	Bechem United	34	11	9	14	38	47	−9	42	
12	Eleven Wonders	34	11	9	14	33	38	−5	42	
13	Legon Cities	34	11	9	14	34	35	−1	42	
14	King Faisal	34	10	11	13	32	45	−13	41	
15	Elmina Sharks	34	10	11	13	34	45	−11	41	
16	Cape Coast Ebusua Dwarfs (R)	34	12	8	14	40	44	−4	41 (Note: Ebusua Dwarfs were deducted 3points.)	Relegation to Division One League
17	Liberty Professionals (R)	34	10	10	14	33	45	−12	40	Relegation to Division One League
18	Inter Allies (R)	34	7	5	22	28	45	−17	26	Relegation to Division One League

Updated to match(es) played on 18 July 2021. Source: type=Goal.com
(C) Champions; (Q) Qualified for the phase indicated; (R) Relegated
Notes:

Ebusua Dwarfs were relegated based on head-to-head disadvantage against Elmina Sharks and King Faisal not goal difference.

== Season statistics ==
=== Scoring ===
==== Top scorers ====
Rank	Player	Club	Goals
1	(Ghana) Diawisie Taylor	Karela United	18
2	Kwame Peprah	King Faisal	12
3	(Ghana) Joseph Esso	Dreams	11
3	Hans Kwofie	Ashanti Gold / Legon Cities	11
3	Stephen Amankona	Berekum Chelsea	11
6	Samuel Adams	Aduana Stars	10
6	Kwadwo Obeng Jnr.	Hearts of Oak	10
6	Maxwell Nii Abbey Quaye	Great Olympics	10
9	Agyenim Boateng Mensah	Dreams	9
9	Augustine Boakye	WAFA	9
9	Benjamin Tweneboah	Elmina Sharks / Aduana Stars	9

==== Hat-tricks ====
Player	For	Against	Result	Date
(Ghana) Kwame Peprah	King Faisal	Berekum Chelsea	4–3 (H)	30 January 2021
(Ghana) Moro Sumaila	Ebusua Dwarfs	Karela United	4–1 (A)	24 April 2021
(Ghana) Isaac Opoku Agyemang	Ashanti Gold	Inter Allies	7–0 (H)	17 July 2021

=== Clean sheets ===
Rank	Player	Club	Clean sheets
1	(Ghana) Razak Abalora	Asante Kotoko	12
1	(Ghana) Richard Attah	Hearts of Oak	12
3	(Ghana) Kofi Baah	Liberty Professionals	11
4	(Ghana) Joseph Addo	Aduana Stars	9
5	(Ghana) Seidu Rashid	Inter Allies	8
5	(Ghana) Richard Baidoo	Karela United	8
5	(Ghana) Frank Boateng	Medeama	8
8	(Ghana) Solomon Agbesi	Dreams	6
8	(Ghana) Benjamin Asare	Great Olympics	6
8	(Ghana) Eric Ofori Antwi	Medeama	6

== Awards ==
=== Monthly awards ===
As of 29 July 2021

Month	Player of the Month		Manager of the Month		References
Month	Player	Club	Manager	Club	References
December	(Ghana) Gladson Awako	Great Olympics	(Ghana) Kwaku Danso	Bechem United	
January	(Ghana) Diawisie Taylor	Karela United	(Ghana) Evans Adotey	Karela United	
February	(Ghana) Joseph Esso	Dreams FC	(Serbia) Vladislav Virić	Dreams FC	
April	(Ghana) Abdul Basit	WAFA	(Ghana) Yaw Preko	Medeama S.C.	
May	(Ghana) Salifu Ibrahim	Hearts of Oak	(Ghana) Samuel Boadu	Hearts of Oak	
June	(Ghana) Augustine Boakye	WAFA	(Ghana) Samuel Boadu	Hearts of Oak	

=== Annual awards ===
Award	Winner	Club	Ref
Ghana Football Awards Coach of the Year	(Ghana) Samuel Boadu	Hearts of Oak	
Ghana Football Awards Home-based Player of Year	(Ghana) Salifu Ibrahim	Hearts of Oak	
GPL NASCO Coach of the Season	(Ghana) Samuel Boadu	Hearts of Oak	
GPL NASCO Player of the Season	(Ghana) Salifu Ibrahim	Hearts of Oak	

== See also ==
- 2020–21 Ghana Women's Premier League
- Ghana Premier League
- 2021 Ghanaian FA Cup
