= Dawu Sports Stadium =

Stadium in Dawu Akuapem, Ghana

- Interactive map of Dawu Sports Stadium
- Location: Dawu, Ghana
- Coordinates: 5°59′N 0°05′W
- Capacity: 5,000
- Surface: Grass

Tenants
- Dreams F.C. (Ghana); International Allies F.C. 4EVA YUNG HILLS F.C.

Dawu Sports Stadium is a multi-use, 5,000-capacity all-seater stadium in Dawu Akuapem in the Eastern Region of Ghana, mostly used for association football matches.

== Overview ==
The Dawu Sports Stadium was built by a businessman called Seth Yeboah for use by his football team, Dawu Youngstars. However, Dawu youngsters have now been dissolved

In 2008, the stadium was the home venue for the African qualifiers for the Nike Premier Cup competition.

The Dawu sports stadium is currently the home ground for Ghana Premier league sides Dreams Fc and International Allies.
