= Dreams F.C. =

Ghanaian professional football club

Dreams Football Club
- Full name: Dreams Football Club
- Nickname: Still Believe
- Founded: 2009; 17 years ago
- Ground: Dawu Sports Stadium
- Capacity: 5,000
- President: Mohammed Jiji Alifoe
- Manager: Winfred Dormon
- League: Ghana Premier League
- 2025–26: 4th
Home colours	Away colours

Dreams Football Club is a Ghanaian professional football club founded in 2009 and based in Dawu in the country's Eastern Region that competes in the Ghana Premier League. On 18 June 2023, they won the FA Cup to gain entry into the CAF Confederation Cup for the first time in their history.

== History ==
Dreams Football Club was founded in 2009 in Kweiman by the current president of the Ghana Football Association, Kurt Okraku, and changed base locations twice; Madina and currently at Dawu.

On 6 January 2017, former Bechem United coach Manuel Zacharias was appointed technical director of the club.

Abdul-Karim Zito served as the club's manager for 4 seasons – two each across two stints from 2018 to 2020 and from 2023 to 2025. He currently coaches rival league club Asante Kotoko and previously the Ghana U-20 team, the latter with which he won the 2021 U-20 Africa Cup of Nations.

Having been below the Ghanaian top-flight since formation, including two seasons in the Division One League, Dreams FC were promoted to the Ghana Premier League for the first time in their history for the 2016 season. However, the Ghana Football Association demoted the club back to Division One in late 2016 after its the Disciplinary Committee found an anomaly with the registration of a player. On 18 June 2023, they beat King Faisal and won the MTN FA Cup to gain entry into the CAF Confederation Cup for the first time in their history.

=== Debut continental campaign ===
Having gained entry to the CAF Confederation Cup with their FA Cup win, executives within the club expressed worries and personal frustrations about financial constraints heading into and throughout their inaugural African campaign. Nevertheless, Dreams F.C. were drawn against Guinean club Milo FC in the first preliminary round and the winners of AS Douanes of Niger and Kallon FC of Sierra Leone in the second preliminary round for a place in the group stages on 25 July 2023. Dreams beat Milo FC 3–2 on aggregate (1–1 draw at the General Lansana Conté Stadium in Conakry and 2–1 at the Baba Yara Stadium in Kumasi, where their CAF campaign would be based). They secured a 3–2 win on aggregate against Kallon, whose first qualifying round opponents AS Douanes withdrew due to the Niger conflict, 2–1 at home and a 1–1 draw away at the Samuel Kanyon Doe Sports Complex stadium in Paynesville, Liberia to confirm their place in the group stages.

Pos	Team	Pld	W	D	L	GF	GA	GD	Pts	Qualification
1	(Ghana) Dreams FC	6	4	0	2	11	7	+4	12 (Note: Ranked on goal difference: Dreams FC +4, Rivers United +2.)	Advance to knockout stage
2	(Nigeria) Rivers United	6	4	0	2	10	8	+2	12	Advance to knockout stage
3	(Tunisia) Club Africain	6	3	1	2	9	4	+5	10	
4	(Angola) Académica do Lobito	6	0	1	5	6	17	−11	1	

Source: Flashscore
Rules for classification: Group stage tiebreakers
Notes:

In the knockout stages, Dreams FC were drawn with Malian side Stade Malien and the winner of Egyptian teams Zamalek SC and Modern Future FC for a place in the final. The defeated Stade Malien 3–2 on aggregate (2–1 away at the Stade du 26 Mars and 1–1 at home) to secure their semi-final spot and receive $750,000. Their journey would however come to an end with Zamalek eliminating them and Modern Future on aggregate; in the case of Dreams a 3–0 away win in Kumasi despite Dreams holding them to a goalless first-leg draw in the first-leg. Overall, their cash flow from their participation amounted to $1.2 million (GHS21 million) and their participant points accumulation coupled with Medeama SC's qualification for the group stage of the CAF Champions League raised Ghana's CAF club ranking from 27th to 14th, just 2 places shy of 12th, where the country could have entered two teams in those CAF club competitions. Their run as defending champions in the FA Cup was brought to an end by Bofoakwa Tano as they defeated them 2–1 at the semi-finals.

== Kit sponsor ==
On 7 October 2016, Dreams FC signed a 3-year kit sponsored deal with Nike ahead of the 2016 Ghanaian Premier League season. Since the 2020–21 season, the team is sported with jerseys and kits manufactured by Mayniak Sports Wear.

== Roster ==
=== First team ===
As of 26 September 2023

Note: Flags indicate national team as defined under FIFA eligibility rules; some limited exceptions apply. Players may hold more than one non-FIFA nationality.

No.	Pos.	Nation	Player
1	GK	GHA	Godfred Amoah
5	DF	GHA	Kingsley Owusu
6	MF	GHA	Victor Oduro
7	FW	GHA	Adamu Amadu
8	MF	GHA	Farhadu Suleiman
9	FW	GHA	Kwaku Karikari
10	MF	GHA	Abdul Fatawu Issahaku
11	FW	GHA	Agyenim Boateng Mensah
12	FW	GHA	Ibrahim Issah
14	DF	GHA	Abdulai Ibrahim
16	GK	GHA	Solomon Agbesi

No.	Pos.	Nation	Player
17	DF	GHA	Habib Mohammed
18	GK	GHA	Augustine Koomson
19	FW	GHA	Huzaf Ali
20	MF	GHA	Simba Sylvester
21	DF	GHA	Abdul Jalilu (captain)
23	DF	GHA	Maxwell Arthur
24	FW	GHA	Musibau Aziz
25	DF	GHA	Issah Yakubu
31	DF	GHA	Abednego Asafo
32	MF	GHA	Sadat Mohammed
32	FW	GHA	Abdul Aziz Issah

=== Coaching staff ===
Position	Name
Manager	(Ghana) Abdul-Karim Zito
Assistant manager	(Ghana) Winfred Dormon
Team manager	(Ghana) Kofi Akosa Agyei-Aygeman
Goalkeeping coach	(Ghana) Raymond Faney
Physiotherapy	(Ghana) Jibril Uthman
Masseur	(Ghana) Haruna Seidu

==== Managerial history ====
Dates	Name
2018–2020	(Ghana) Abdul-Karim Zito
2020–2021	(Ghana) Winfred Dormon
2021–2022	(Serbia) Vladislav Virić
2022	(Ghana) Ignatius Osei-Fosu
2022–present	(Ghana) Abdul-Karim Zito

=== Management ===
Position	Name
President	Mohammed Jiji Alifoe
Vice-president	Prince Abdul Hamid
Administrative Manager	Ameenu Shardow
General Manager	Ameenu Shardow
Deputy General Manager	Enoch Agyare Addo
Substative Manager	Winfred Dormon
Head, Dreams Media	Derrick A. Okraku
Community and Supporters Relations Manager	Alhaji Yussif ‘Cliff’ Iddrisu
Finance officer	Theresa Nelly Slippi- Mensah
Administrative Secretary	Augustina Afful

=== Youth team players ===
The youth team section of Dreams F.C. has produced players such as:

- John Antwi, currently a first-team regular at Dreams FC.
- Baba Rahman of Chelsea and Reading on loan in England, now playing for PAOK of Greece
- Benjamin Tetteh, previously of Sparta Prague in the Czech First League, now at French club Metz.
- Leonard Owusu of Vancouver Whitecaps in the Major League Soccer.
- Montari Kamaheni of Ashdod in the Israeli Premier League.
- Emmanuel Lomotey, formerly of Villarreal B and on loan at defunct club Extremadura of Spain, now at Malmo FF in Sweden, playing on loan at Ethnikos Achna of Cyprus
- Lawson Bekui, previously played for AC Kajaani in Finland, now at Al-Entesar Club in Saudi Arabia.
- Samuel Alabi, previously of Ashdod in the Israeli Premier League, now at Luzern, playing on loan at Baden in the Swiss Super League
- Emmanuel Sowah Adjei, previously played at Anderlecht in the Belgian Pro League.
- Abdul Aziz Issah, currently on loan at FC Barcelona Atlètic, the feeder or second team of FC Barcelona
