= King Faisal F.C. =

Association football club in Kumasi

King Faisal
- Full name: King Faisal Football Club
- Nickname: Babes
- Ground: Kumasi Sports Stadium
- Capacity: 40,000
- Chairman: Alhaji Karim Gruza
- League: Division One League
Home colours	Away colours

King Faisal Football Club, nicknamed the Babes, is a Ghanaian professional football club based in Kumasi, Ashanti Region. Owned by Kumasi's Muslim community and named after King Faisal of Saudi Arabia, the Babes compete in Division One League, the second tier football league in Ghana. They were represented at the 2006 FIFA World Cup by left-back Habib Mohamed.

== Achievements ==
- Ghana Top Four Cup
  - Champions (1): 2004

== Performance in CAF competitions ==
- CAF Confederation Cup:

2004 – second round
2005 – group stage
2006 – first round

== Current squad ==
As of 15 April 2023

Note: Flags indicate national team as defined under FIFA eligibility rules; some limited exceptions apply. Players may hold more than one non-FIFA nationality.

No.	Pos.	Nation	Player
1	GK	GHA	Adams Abdul Jabal
2	DF	GHA	Joseph Dwomoh
3	DF	GHA	Samuel Antwi
4	DF	GHA	Joseph Faridu
5	MF	GHA	Boateng Frimpong
6	DF	GHA	William Dankyi
7	FW	GHA	Richard Kwesi
8	MF	GHA	Nasiru Ebla
9	FW	GHA	Benjamin Bature
10	MF	GHA	Yahaya Baba
11	FW	GHA	Gabriel Osei
13	MF	GHA	Junior Kofi
14	DF	GHA	David Afrane
15	MF	GHA	Abdul Latif
16	GK	GHA	Benjamin Kwesi

No.	Pos.	Nation	Player
17	MF	GHA	Samuel Kusi
18	MF	GHA	Emmanuel Nketiah
19	DF	GHA	Perry Rockson
20	MF	GHA	Joseph Gordon
21	DF	GHA	Ibrahim Suraj
23	MF	GHA	Nazir Musah
24	DF	GHA	Joseph Mensah
26	MF	GHA	Isaac Yeboah
27	DF	GHA	Godfred Asiamah
28	MF	GHA	Hayford Gyimah
29	FW	GHA	Samuel Boakye
30	DF	GHA	Rockshell Osei
35	DF	GHA	Seidu Faisal
39	MF	GHA	Gadafi Amadu

== Managers ==
- (Ghana) Nana Whyte (1998–2001)
- (Germany) Hans-Dieter Schmidt (2003–2004)
- (England) Steven Polack (2007–2009)
- (Croatia) Zdravko Logarušić (2009–2010)
- (Croatia) Miroslav Buljan (2011)
- (Ghana) Stephen Agburi (2012)
- (Ghana) Mallam Yahaya (2012–2013)
- (Romania) Dorian Marin (2014)
- (Serbia) Slaviša Božičić (January–December 2020)
