= 2020–21 West African Football Academy season =

West African Football Academy
- Chairman: Karel Brokken
- Manager: Prosper Narteh Ogum
- Stadium: WAFA Stadium; South Tongu District, Volta Region, Ghana
- Premier League: 3rd
- FA Cup: Knockout round 16
- All statistics correct as of 11 August 2021.

The 2021–21 season of Ghanaian club West African Football Academy (WAFA). The season covered the period from 20 November 2020 to 8 August 2021.

== Season overview ==
West African Football Academy ended the 2020–21 season without a trophy after placing third in the domestic the league and was knock out by Young Wise in the FA Cup

== Technical team ==
The technical team

Position	Name
Head coach	(Ghana) Prosper Narteh Ogum

== Squad ==
Squad

As of 1 January 2021

Note: Flags indicate national team as defined under FIFA eligibility rules; some limited exceptions apply. Players may hold more than one non-FIFA nationality.

No.	Pos.	Nation	Player
1	GK	GHA	Prince Ato Bilson
2	DF	GHA	Mohammed Samed Abdul Karim
3	DF	GHA	John Tedeku
4	MF	GHA	Derrick Mensah
5	MF	GHA	Michael Kyei Dwamena
6	MF	GHA	Kelvin Boakye Yiadom
7	FW	GHA	Godwin Agbevor
8	MF	GHA	Ransford Appah
9	FW	GHA	Marvin Owusu
10	MF	GHA	Augustine Boakye
11	MF	GHA	Forson Amankwah
12	DF	GHA	Francis Boateng
13	FW	GHA	Sampson Agyapong
14	FW	GHA	Daniel Owusu
15	FW	GHA	Eric Asamany
16	GK	GHA	Boliver Sarfo Owusu

No.	Pos.	Nation	Player
17	DF	GHA	Ransford Darko
18	MF	GHA	Lawrence Agyekum
19	MF	GHA	Seidu Faisal
20	DF	TOG	Youssifou Atte
21	DF	GHA	Suraj Musah
22	MF	GHA	Michael Danso Agyemang
23	GK	GHA	Sabi Acquah Ferdinand
24	DF	GHA	Nii Gyashie Bortey Acquaye
25	DF	GHA	Konadu Yiadom
26	MF	GHA	Enock Asubonteng
27	DF	GHA	Andrew Ntim Manu
28	DF	GHA	Ibrahim Abukari (captain)
29	FW	GHA	Daniel Lomotey
30	FW	GHA	Jalilu Haruna Mola
32	FW	GHA	Justus Torsutsey
33	MF	GHA	Derrick Mensah Antwi
36	FW	GHA	Issah Abdul Basit

=== Win Draw Loss Fixtures ===
The season was delayed as a result of COVID-19 pandemic in Ghana, causing the team to start preparations in September 2020.

Friendly	WAFA (Ghana)	6–2	(Ghana) Top Scout Football Academy	Sogakope
		Report

Friendly	Tema Youth (Ghana)	0-1	(Ghana) WAFA
		Report

== Competitions ==
=== Premier League ===
==== League table ====
Pos	Team	Pld	W	D	L	GF	GA	GD	Pts	Promotion or relegation
1	Hearts of Oak (C, Q)	34	17	10	7	45	23	+22	61	2021–22 CAF Champions League
2	Asante Kotoko	34	15	12	7	37	22	+15	57	
3	WAFA	34	16	8	10	46	38	+8	56	
4	Aduana Stars	34	16	7	11	44	42	+2	55	
5	Medeama	34	15	9	10	38	34	+4	54	

Updated to match(es) played on 18 July 2021. Source: type=Goal.com
(C) Champions; (Q) Qualified for the phase indicated
