= 2017 WAFU Cup of Nations squads =

Squad for 2017 WAFU Cup of Nations.

== Group 1 ==
=== Ghana ===
Coach: (Ghana) Maxwell Konadu, The final squad was announced on 8 September 2017.

| No. | Pos. | Player | Date of birth (age) | Caps | Club |
|---|---|---|---|---|---|
| | GK | Joseph Addo | | | (Ghana) Aduana Stars |
| | GK | Felix Annan | | | (Ghana) Asante Kotoko |
| | DF | Amos Frimpong | | | (Ghana) Asante Kotoko |
| | DF | Emmanuel Ampiah | | | (Ghana) Elmina Sharks |
| | DF | Samuel Sarfo | | | (Ghana) Liberty Professionals |
| | DF | Vincent Atinga | | | (Ghana) Hearts of Oak |
| | DF | Nuhu Musah | | | (Ghana) WAFA |
| | DF | Ahmed Adams | | | (Ghana) Asante Kotoko |
| | MF | Gideon Waja | | | (Ghana) WAFA |
| | MF | Isaac Twum | | | (Ghana) International Allies |
| | MF | Emmanuel Lomotey | | | (Ghana) Dreams FC |
| | MF | Winful Cobbinah | | | (Ghana) Hearts of Oak |
| | MF | Patrick Razak | | | (Ghana) Hearts of Oak |
| | MF | Richmond Lamptey | | | (Ghana) WAFA |
| | MF | Thomas Abbey | | | (Ghana) Hearts of Oak |
| | FW | Felix Addo | | | (Ghana) Elmina Sharks |
| | FW | Stephen Sarfo | | | (Ghana) Berekum Chelsea |
| | FW | Kwame Kizito | | | (Ghana) Hearts of Oak |

=== Nigeria ===
Coach: (Nigeria) Salisu Yusuf, final squad was named on 8 September 2017

=== Gambia ===
Coach: (The Gambia) Omar Sise, final squad was named on 8 September 2017
