= Feyenoord Academy Ghana =

Feyenoord Academy
- Full name: Feyenoord Academy
- Founded: 1998
- Dissolved: 2014
- Ground: Academy grounds Goma Fetteh, Ghana
- Chairman: (Netherlands) Karel Brokken
- Manager: Sam Arday
- Coach: (Netherlands) John Kila
- League: Central Regional Division 2 League
- 2012: 4th
Home colours	Away colours

Feyenoord Academy was a Ghanaian football club and the biggest football academy in Ghana based in Goma Fetteh, and was founded by Feyenoord from Rotterdam. They played in the Ghanaian Premier League.

In August 2014 the club was merged with Red Bull Academy to form the West African Football Academy S.C.

== History ==
Feyenoord's chairman Jorien van den Herik was given permission for the opening of Feyenoord's own football academy in the Ghanaian settlement of Fetteh, just outside the capital Accra. The go-ahead was given by the Chief of Fetteh in 1998. At the academy, young talented African footballers can work on their football skills. In addition to helping their football potential the students are provided with formal education which is funded by Feyenoord. Former Feyenoord player Mohammed Abubakari is the first player that graduated from the academy and achieved a professional contract at Feyenoord. Prior to Abubakari's move, Jordan Opoku spent some time at Excelsior and Royal Antwerp FC before returning to Ghana.

In the buildup to the 2008–09 season, right-back Harrison Afful is on trial with Feyenoord.

The idea for Feyenoord's own football academy was born in Abidjan. Jorien van den Herik was there to sign the then still unknown Bonaventure Kalou and got into contact with the education institute at Kalou's club. That same year the head of the youth education flew to Africa to take stock in the project and returned with a praising report. In January 1998 the ball got rolling: Feyenoord would start its own Football School in Africa.

In August 2014, Feyenoord Academy was reorganised and renamed the West African Football Academy. In the same year, the club took over the old Red Bull Academy near Sogakope and moved from their old location in Gomoa Fetteh to this new location in the Volta Region.

== Satellite clubs ==
The following clubs were affiliated with Feyenoord Gomoa Fetteh:

- (Ivory Coast) ASEC Mimosas
- (Netherlands) Feyenoord Rotterdam

== Squad ==
as of 11 June 2014 Note: Flags indicate national team as defined under FIFA eligibility rules; some limited exceptions apply. Players may hold more than one non-FIFA nationality.

No.	Pos.	Nation	Player
1	GK	GHA	Theophilus Jackson
2	DF	CIV	Lassana Bi Coulibaly
3	DF	GHA	Bernard Mensah
4	MF	GHA	Felix Annan
5	DF	GHA	Kakra Boakye-Mensah
6	DF	GHA	Ibrahim Adamu
7	DF	GHA	Isaac Addai
8	MF	GHA	Joe Amoah (Captain)
9	FW	GHA	Emmanuel Oti Essigba
10	MF	BFA	Abdoul Basit Zongo
11	MF	GHA	Abubakar Sulemana
12	DF	GHA	Kweku Seth Osei
13	GK	BFA	Abdouraziz Guire
14	MF	GHA	Panin Boakye-Mensah
15	FW	GHA	Alhassan Manan

No.	Pos.	Nation	Player
16	MF	GHA	Richmond Lamptey
17	DF	BFA	Abdoul Nikiema
18	FW	GHA	Ali Mohamed
19	FW	BFA	Louck Ouedtraogo
20	DF	GHA	Zakaria Seidu
21	MF	GHA	Basit Masawudu
22	GK	GHA	George Owusu
23	FW	GHA	Charles Boateng
24	DF	GHA	Gideon Waja
25	MF	GHA	Mumuni Zakaria
26	DF	GHA	Martin Atnwi
27	FW	GHA	Iddrisu Kato
28	MF	NIG	Mohammed Wonkoye
29	FW	GHA	Samuel Tetteh

Head coach

- (Netherlands) John Kila

Technical director

- (Ghana) Sam Arday

== Notable players ==
=== FIFA World Cup participants ===
- (Ghana) Dominic Adiyiah (2010)
- (Ghana) Harrison Afful (2014)
- (Ghana) Christian Atsu (2014)

=== Africa Cup of Nations participants ===
- (Ghana) Philemon McCarthy (2006, 2010)
- (Ghana) Nana Akwasi Asare (2008)
- (Ghana) Harrison Afful (2008, 2010, 2013, 2015, 2017)
- (Ghana) Dominic Adiyiah (2010)
- (Ghana) Solomon Asante (2013, 2015)
- (Ghana) Christian Atsu (2013, 2015, 2017, 2019)
- (Ghana) Mohamed Awal (2013, 2015)
- (Ghana) Samuel Tetteh (2017)
- (Ghana) Felix Annan (2019)
- (Ghana) Richmond Lamptey (2023)

=== Other national team representants ===
- (Ghana) Razak Abalora
- (Ghana) Michael Akuffu
- (Ghana) Ernest Asante
- (Ghana) Sherif Danladi
- (Ghana) Gilbert Fiamenyo
- (Ghana) Jordan Opoku
- (Burkina Faso) Nii Plange
- (Ghana) Mark Sekyere
- (Ghana) Gideon Waja

=== Other players ===
- (Ghana) Mohammed Abubakari
- (Ghana) Joseph Amoah
- (Ghana) Emmanuel Boateng
- (Ghana) Emmanuel Dogbe
- (Ghana) Yaw Frimpong
- (Ghana) Abdul-Yakuni Iddi
- (Ghana) Abdul Nafiu Idrissu
- (Ghana) Aboubakar Mahadi
- (Ghana) Emmanuel Oti
- (Burkina Faso) Louckmane Ouédraogo
