= Acquaye =

Acquaye is a Ghanaian surname. Notable people with the surname include:

- Bianca Froese-Acquaye (born 1964), German artist, author and painter
- David Kpakpoe Acquaye (born 1928), Ghanaian academic and agriculturalist
- J. K. Acquaye (born 1940), Ghanaian academic and haematologist
- Nii Gyashie Bortey Acquaye (born 1999), Ghanaian footballer
- Saka Acquaye (1923–2007), Ghanaian artist, musician, playwright
- W. C. O. Acquaye-Nortey (born 1930), Ghanaian soldier and politician
