= Nafiu =

Nafiu is a surname. Notable people with the surname include:

- Abdul Nafiu Idrissu (born 1991), Ghanaian footballer
- Awudu Nafiu (born 1988), Ghanaian footballer who was a part of the 2011 African Nations Championship squads#Ghana
- Nafiu Osagie (1933–2019), Nigerian athlete
- Valmir Nafiu (born 1994), Macedonian footballer of Albanian descent
