= Joseph Amoah (footballer, born 1994) =

Ghanaian football player

Personal information
- Date of birth: 26 June 1994 (age 32)
- Place of birth: Accra, Ghana
- Height: 1.78 m (5 ft 10 in)
- Position: Midfielder

Team information
- Current team: Paredes

Youth career
- –2014: Fetteh Feyenoord

Senior career*
Years	Team	Apps	(Gls)
2014–2018	Vitória SC B	82	(0)
2014–2023	Vitória SC	22	(0)
2023–2024	União de Leiria	4	(0)
2024	→ Fafe (loan)	9	(0)
2024–	Paredes	5	(0)
- * Club domestic league appearances and goals as of 10 November 2024

Joseph Amoah (born 26 June 1994) is a Ghanaian professional footballer who plays as a midfielder for Portuguese club Paredes.

== Club career ==
He made his professional debut in the Segunda Liga for Vitória Guimarães B on 1 March 2015 in a game against Santa Clara.

He made his Primeira Liga debut for Vitória Guimarães on 23 May 2015 coming in as a second-half substitute for compatriot and fellow Fetteh Feyenoord product Bernard Mensah in a 4–2 victory over Académica de Coimbra.

On 11 August 2023, recently promoted to Liga Portugal 2 side União de Leiria announced the signing of Amoah on a one-year contract. On 31 January 2024, Leiria loaned him to Liga 3 club Fafe until the end of the season.
