= Feyenoord Academy =

Feyenoord Academy may refer to:

- Feyenoord Academy (Varkenoord), Dutch football academy
- Feyenoord Ghana, Ghanaian football academy
