= Asubonteng =

Asubonteng is a surname. Notable people with the surname include:

- Enock Asubonteng (born 2000), Ghanaian footballer
- Prince Asubonteng (born 1986), Ghanaian footballer
