= Bortey =

Bortey is a surname. Notable people with the surname include:

- Bernard Dong Bortey (born 1982), Ghanaian footballer
- Jon Bortey Noawy (born 1939), Ghanaian footballer
- Nii Gyashie Bortey Acquaye (born 1999), Ghanaian footballer
