= West African Football Academy =

Association football club in Ghana

West African Football Academy S.C.
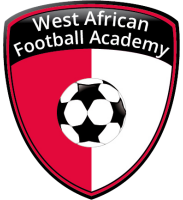
- Full name: West African Football Academy Sporting Club
- Nickname: WAFA
- Founded: 2014
- Ground: WAFA Stadium; South Tongu District, Volta Region, Ghana
- Capacity: 1,000
- Coordinates: 6°2′07″N 0°33′02″E
- Chairman: (Netherlands) Karel Brokken
- Website: https://www.westafricanfootballacademy.com/

West African Football Academy Sporting Club or WAFA for short, is a Ghanaian professional football club based near Sogakope in the Volta Region. They are competing in the Ghana Premier League. The 2016–17 season was a successful one for WAFA as the side finished second in the Premier League, beating Hearts of Oak 5–0 along the way.

The club was founded in August 2014, as the Feyenoord Academy in Goma Fetteh, founded by Feyenoord from Rotterdam, and Red Bull Academy near Sogakope were merged.

== History ==
=== Feyenoord Academy ===
Feyenoord's chairman Jorien van den Herik was given permission for the opening of Feyenoord's own football academy in the Ghanaian settlement of Gomoa Fetteh, just outside the capital Accra. The go-ahead was given by the Chief of Fetteh in 1998 and the academy was opened in October 1999. At Feyenoord Academy, young talented African footballers could work on their football skills. In addition to helping their football potential the students were provided with formal education which was funded by Feyenoord. The idea for Feyenoord's own football academy was formed in Abidjan.

Van den Herik signed the then still unknown Bonaventure Kalou and got into contact with the education institute at Kalou's club. That same year the head of the education institute flew to Africa to take stock of the project and returned with a praising report. In January 1998, Feyenoord started its own Football School in Africa.

Mohammed Abubakari was the first player that graduated from the academy and achieved a professional contract at Feyenoord.

=== Red Bull Ghana ===
Founded in 2008, the academy associated with the team has gone on to produce coaches and players alike. The team reached the second highest league in Ghana in 2009. Red Bull Ghana was relegated to Division Two in 2013.

=== Merger ===
In August 2014, Feyenoord Academy was rebranded to the name West African Football Academy. In the same year, the club took over the old Red Bull Academy near Sogakope and moved from their old location in Gomoa Fetteh to this new location in the Volta Region.

== Current squad ==
As of 1 January 2021

Note: Flags indicate national team as defined under FIFA eligibility rules; some limited exceptions apply. Players may hold more than one non-FIFA nationality.

No.	Pos.	Nation	Player
1	GK	GHA	Anthony Brebo
4	MF	GHA	Derrick Mensah
6	MF	BFA	Faad Sana
7	FW	GHA	Godwin Agbevor
8	MF	GHA	Ransford Appah
9	FW	GHA	Marvin Owusu
11	MF	GHA	Emmanuel Agyeman Ofori
12	DF	GHA	Francis Boateng
13	FW	GHA	Emmanuel Agyemang
14	FW	GHA	Eric Asamany
15	DF	GHA	Mohammed Karim Samed Abdul

No.	Pos.	Nation	Player
16	GK	GHA	Boliver Sarfo Owusu
17	DF	GHA	Ransford Darko
19	DF	GHA	Seidu Faisal
22	MF	GHA	Michael Danso Agyemang
23	GK	GHA	Sabi Acquah Ferdinand
28	FW	GHA	Awudu Mohammed
30	DF	GHA	Razak Simpson
32	FW	GHA	Justus Torsutsey
33	MF	GHA	Derrick Mensah Antwi
36	FW	GHA	Issah Abdul Basit
40	GK	GHA	Kwadwo Bonsu

=== Academy ===
Note: Flags indicate national team as defined under FIFA eligibility rules; some limited exceptions apply. Players may hold more than one non-FIFA nationality.

No.	Pos.	Nation	Player
—	FW	TOG	Josue Doke

== Notable players ==
=== FIFA World Cup participants ===
- (Ghana) Gideon Mensah (2022, 2026)
- (Ghana) Augustine Boakye (2026)

=== Africa Cup of Nations participants ===
- (Ghana) Philemon McCarthy (2006, 2010)
- (Togo) Komlan Agbégniadan (2017)
- (Ghana) Samuel Tetteh (2017)
- (Ghana) Felix Annan (2019)
- (Ghana) Gideon Mensah (2021, 2023)
- (Ghana) Majeed Ashimeru (2023)
- (Ghana) Richmond Lamptey (2023)

=== Other national team representants ===
- (Ghana) Razak Abalora
- (Ghana) Lawrence Agyekum
- (Ghana) Mohammed Alhassan
- (Togo) Youssifou Atté
- (Togo) Josué Doké
- (Ghana) Amankwah Forson
- (Ghana) Zakaria Mumuni
- (Togo) Faad Sana
- (Ghana) Razak Simpson
- (Ghana) Gideon Waja
- (Ghana) Terry Yegbe

=== Other players ===
- (Ghana) Ibrahim Abukari
- (Ghana) Nii Gyashie Bortey Acquaye
- (Ghana) Sampson Agyapong
- (Ghana) Emmanuel Agyemang
- (Ghana) Prosper Ahiabu
- (Ghana) Mubarak Alhassan
- (Ghana) Caleb Amankwah
- (Ghana) Mohammed Aminu
- (Ghana) Elvis Amoh
- (Ghana) Prince Ampem
- (Ghana) Isaac Assibu
- (Ghana) Enock Asubonteng
- (Ghana) Richmond Ayi
- (Ghana) Umar Bashiru
- (Ghana) Issah Abdul Basit
- (Ghana) Isaac Boakye
- (Ghana) Charles Boateng
- (Ghana) Emmanuel Boateng
- (Ghana) Richard Danso
- (Ghana) Michael Kyei Dwamena
- (Ghana) Jamal Haruna
- (Ghana) Abdul Ibrahim
- (Ghana) Daniel Lomotey
- (Ghana) Andrew Ntim Manu
- (Ghana) Musah Nuhu
- (Ghana) Lawrence Ofori
- (Ghana) Emmanuel Oti
- (Ghana) Daniel Owusu
- (Ghana) Marvin Owusu
- (Ghana) Ibrahim Tanko
- (Ghana) John Tedeku
- (Ghana) Justus Torsutsey
- (Ghana) Konadu Yiadom

== Club captains ==
- Jordan Opoku (2003) (2005–06)
- Gideon Waja (2016–2017)
- Mohammed Alhassan (2017–2018)
- Ibrahim Abukari (2019–)

== Managerial history ==
- (Netherlands) John Kila (2014–2016)
- (Denmark) Klavs Rasmussen (2016–2018)
- (Ghana) Saddiq Abubakari (2018)
- (France) Patrick Liewig (2018–2019)
- (Ghana) Prosper Narteh Ogum (2019–2021)
- (Spain) Guillermo Zaragoza (2021–2022)

== Gallery ==
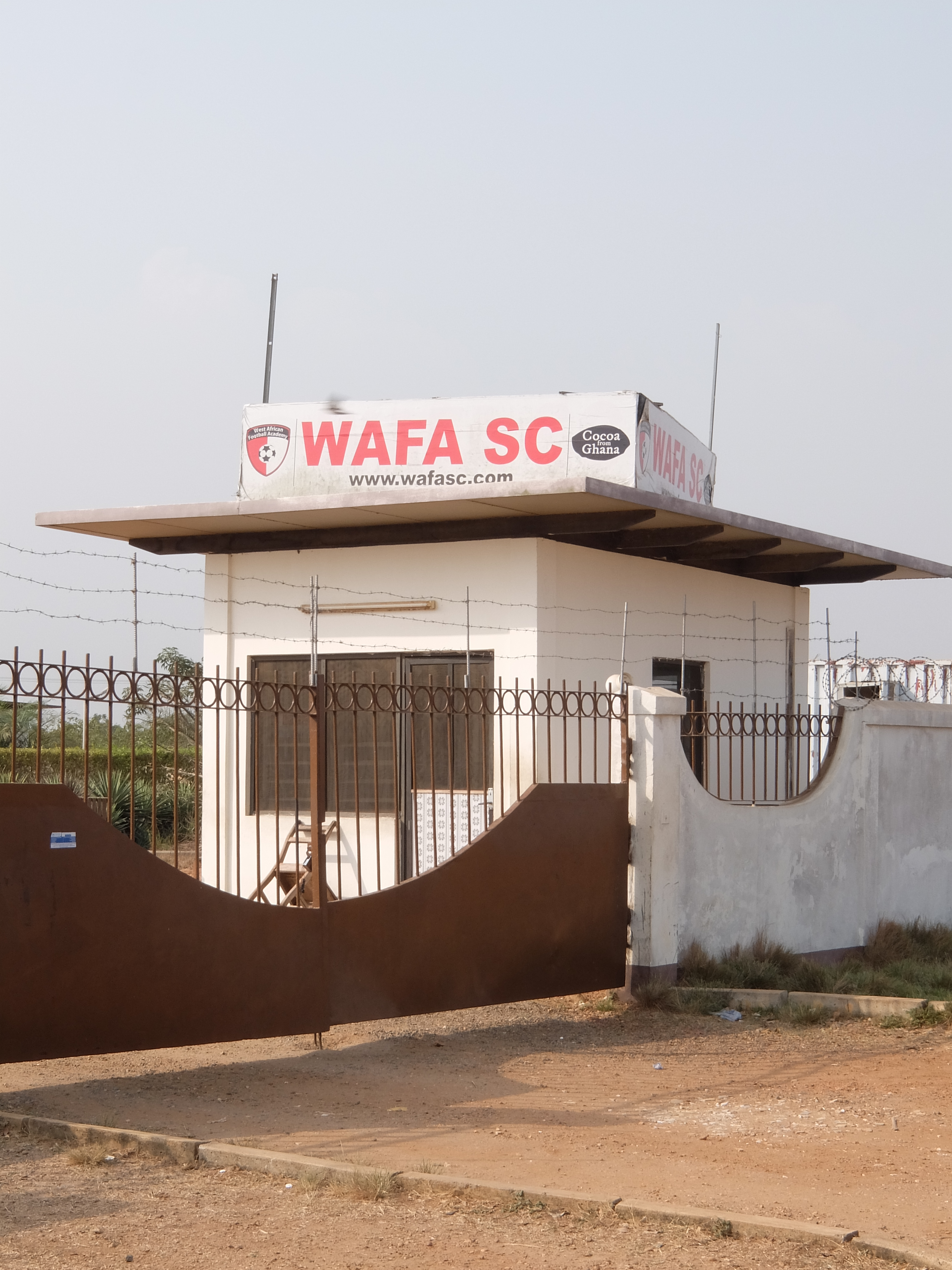

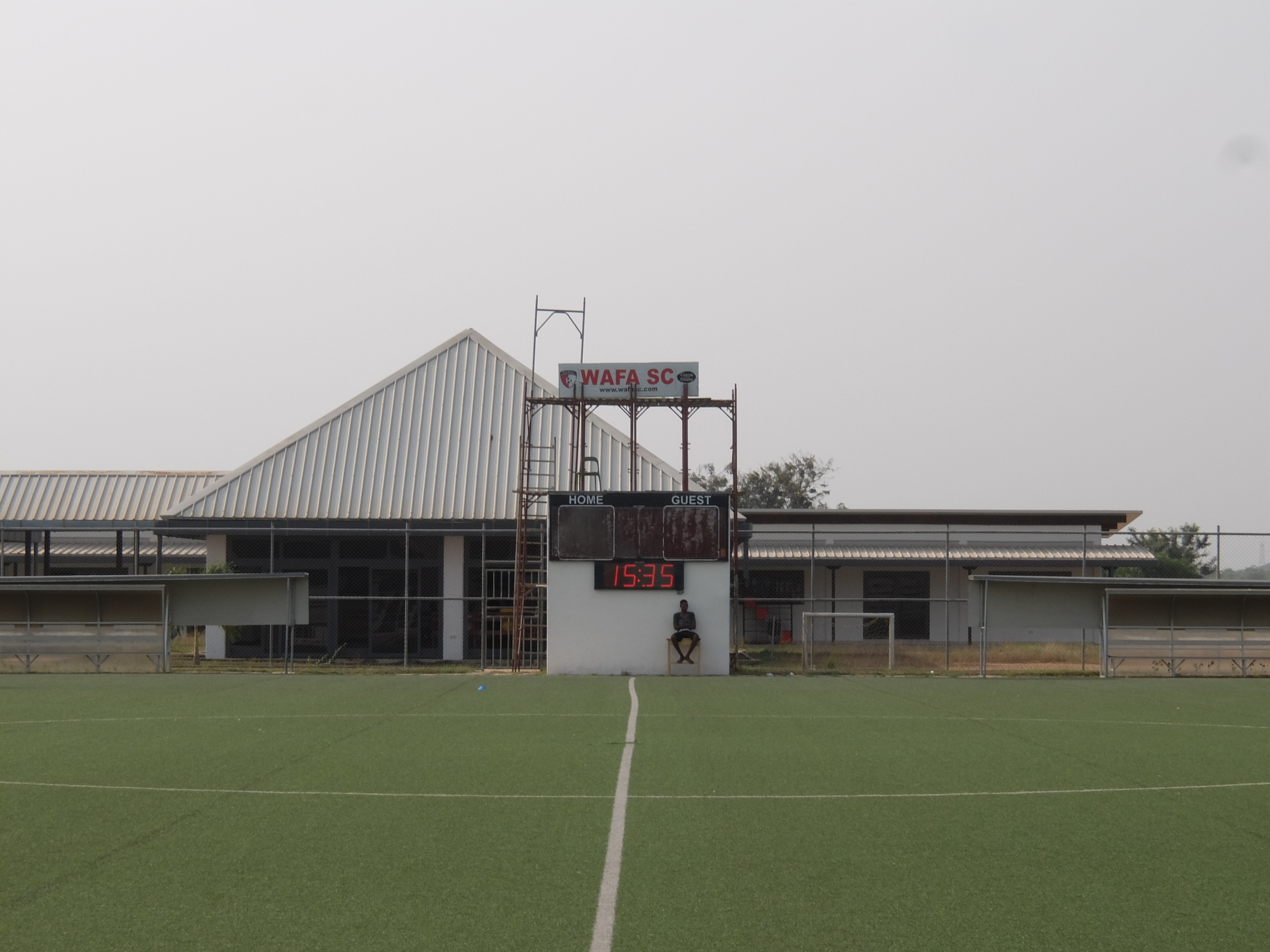

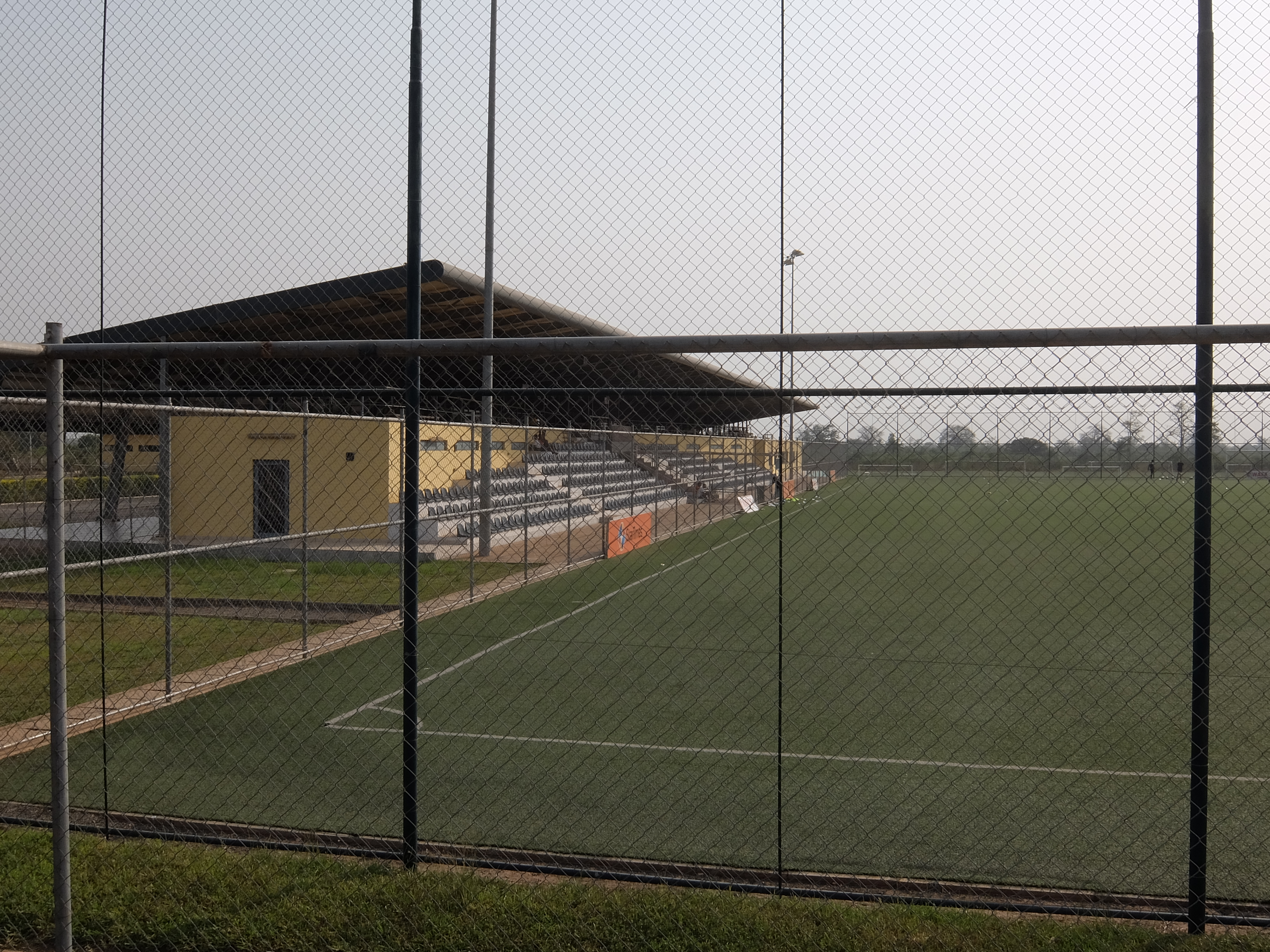

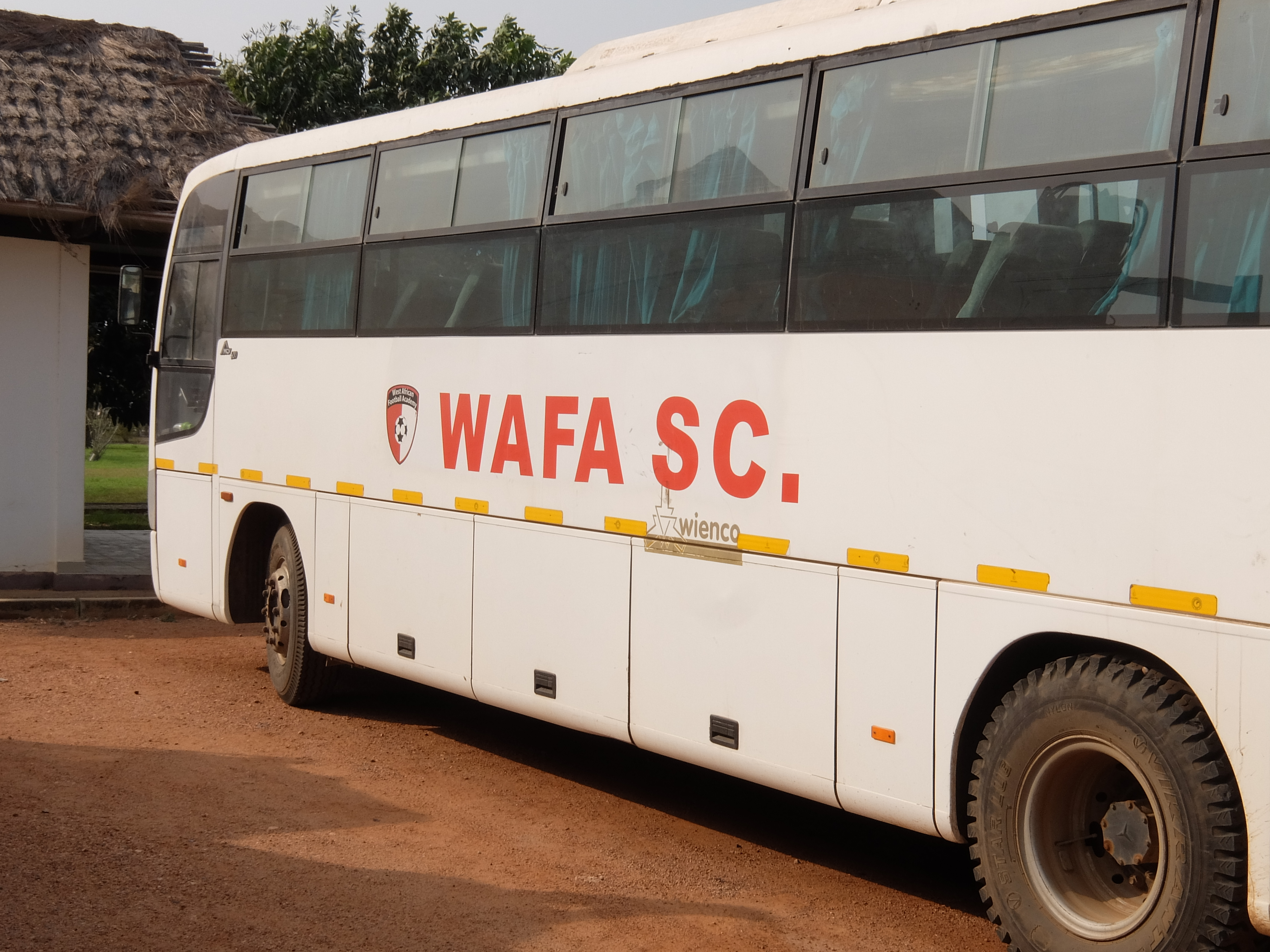

== Seasons ==
2020 -21 West African Football Academy season
