= Mark Sekyere =

Ghanaian footballer (born 1989)

Personal information
- Full name: Mark Kofi Sekyere
- Date of birth: 28 December 1989 (age 36)
- Place of birth: Kumasi, Ghana
- Height: 1.66 m (5 ft 5 in)
- Position: Midfielder

Youth career
- Feyenoord Academy

Senior career*
Years	Team	Apps	(Gls)
2008	Asante Kotoko		
2009–2010	ASEC Mimosas		
2011	Feyenoord Academy		
2011–2015	ASEC Mimosas		
2015	Asante Kotoko		

International career
2009	Ghana	1	(0)
- * Club domestic league appearances and goals

Mark Kofi Sekyere (born 28 December 1989) is a Ghanaian former footballer who played as a midfielder.

== Club career ==
Sekyere was born in Kumasi. He began his career by Feyenoord Academy, before joining Asante Kotoko on 12 June 2008. After half a year with the Kumasi-based side he moved to ASEC Mimosas in January 2009. Following three seasons with ASEC Mimosas he returned to his home club Feyenoord Academy.

In October 2014, Asante Kotoko announced it registered Sekyere to its 2014/2015 squad.

== International career ==
On 4 December 2008, Sekyere was nominated for the African Cup of Nations Qualifier 2009 for the Black Stars and played his debut on 19 November 2009 against Angola.
