= Sherif Danladi =

Ghanaian football midfielder

Personal information
- Full name: Sheriff Danladi
- Date of birth: 23 December 1989 (age 36)
- Place of birth: Kumasi, Ghana
- Position: Defensive midfielder

Team information
- Current team: Heart of Lions
- Number: 6

Youth career
- 1997–1998: Kaloum Stars
- 1999–2001: Corners Babies

Senior career*
Years	Team	Apps	(Gls)
2002–2005	Feyenoord Academy	41	(4)
2006–2008	Liberty Professionals	33	(2)
2008–2010	All Blacks F.C.	30	(3)
2010–	Heart of Lions	28	

International career
2007–	Ghana	6	(1)
- * Club domestic league appearances and goals

Sherif Danladi (born 23 December 1989 in Kumasi) is a Ghanaian football midfielder, and currently plays for Heart of Lions in the Ghana Premier League.

== Domestic career ==
Born in Kumasi, Danladi started his footballing career with Kaloum Stars, a heavyweight juvenile club based in Kumasi. Having graduated from the Under-12 level, he joined Corners Babies, a rival club to Kaloum Stars, for the Under-14 and Under-17 divisions. He had grown into an indispensable team core member, playing an offensive midfield position with other stars that included Yussif Chibsah and Edmund Owusu Ansah. With numerous goals coming off his boots, Corners Babies had been the most formidable opponent; essentially the team to beat in the 90s’ juvenile league.

Graduating from the Under-17 level, Danladi was admitted into Feyenoord Academy by the highly rated national team coach Sam Ardy. He was made the captain of the team from 2002 to 2005, and the side got promoted to the Premier League. Danladi was turned into a holding midfielder by Coach Ardy. During the 2005 season, he was adjudged the best defender in the country, beating off competition from national team players like Yussif Chibsah, Illiasu Shilla and Godfred Yeboah. He has also received many “man of the match” accolades: seven and three in the 2005 and 2007 seasons respectively.

At the end of the 2005 season, a host of clubs including the top two: Accra Hearts of Oak and Asante Kotoko had chased for his signature but it was Liberty Professionals that got him.

== International career ==
Danladi has been a member of two of the national teams in Ghana. From 2004 to 2006, he was a key member of the Ghana Black Satellite, the national under 20 side, and in 2006, graduated to the Black Meteors- the under 23 side.

== Honours ==
All Star Team

- Ghana Premier League: 2007
