= Aboubakar Mahadi =

Ghanaian footballer

Abubakar Mahadi
Personal information
- Full name: Abubakar Mahadi
- Date of birth: 29 November 1993 (age 32)
- Place of birth: Accra, Ghana
- Height: 1.84 m (6 ft 0 in)
- Position: Striker

Youth career
- 2003–2006: Feyenoord Academy
- 2007: Académie de Sol Beni

Senior career*
Years	Team	Apps	(Gls)
2008	ASEC Mimosas		
2008–2009	Feyenoord Academy		
2010–2011	Medeama SC		
2010–2011	→ Kaduna United F.C. (loan)		
2011–2012	Wassaman United		
2012–2014	Dak Lak F.C.		
2014–2017	Sông Lam Nghệ An F.C.	11	(4)
2017	Asante Kotoko		
2017–2018	Entag El Harby		
2018	Mauerwerk		
2018–2019	Afif		

International career^{‡}
2011	Ghana U-20		
- * Club domestic league appearances and goals as of 15:20, 5 June 2010 (UTC) ‡ National team caps and goals as of 11:50, 1 June 2012 (UTC)

Abubakar Mahadi (born 29 November 1993 in Accra) is a Ghanaian football striker.

== Career ==
Mahadi began his career by Feyenoord Academy, joined than to Académie de Sol Beni. Promoted to the first team in 2008 and will hope to see game time in his first MTN CAF Champions League campaign, in September 2008 moved back to Feyenoord Academy. He joined in summer 2010 to Medeama SC F.C., which loaned him on 24. September 2010 to Kaduna United F.C. of Nigeria. Despite all the attempts made by Kaduna FC for the outright signature of the young Ghanaian striker has proven unsuccessful. In summer 2011 Aboubakar Mahadi signed for Wassaman United and scored his first goal for his new club on 30 July 2011 against Tarkwa United.

He moved to Saudi club Afeef in 2018.
