= Philemon McCarthy =

Ghanaian footballer

Personal information
- Full name: Philemon Tei McCarthy
- Date of birth: 14 August 1983 (age 43)
- Place of birth: Accra, Ghana
- Height: 1.95 m (6 ft 5 in)
- Position: Goalkeeper

Youth career
- Golden Boys

Senior career*
Years	Team	Apps	(Gls)
2003–2008	Feyenoord Academy		
2008–2014	Accra Hearts of Oak		
2012	→ Wassaman United (loan)		
2015	Accra Great Olympics		
2016	West African Football Academy	1	(0)
2016	Dreams		
2017	Hapoel Afula	21	(0)
2018	Dreams		
2020–2021	Dreams		

International career
2005–2009	Ghana	2	(0)
- * Club domestic league appearances and goals

Philemon Tei McCarthy (born 14 August 1983) is a Ghanaian former professional footballer who plays as a goalkeeper.

== Club career ==
McCarthy was born in Accra, Ghana. He began his career with Golden Boys before joining the Feyenoord Academy in 2005. In 2008, McCarthy left Feyenoord Academy to join Accra Hearts of Oak. He was a key member of the Accra Hearts of Oak team that won the league in the 2008–09 season. McCarthy is in his second spell with the club but he has been afflicted with injuries since his return. He was the standout player in a match against Asante Kotoko in Kumasi on 15 April 2012. He dislocated his finger after a save in the game and he was not able to continue. His team lost the game 2–1 to their rivals after his substitution.

He re-joined former club Dreams during the 2017–18 season following a stint with Israeli club Hapoel Afula.

McCarthy moved to Dreams for a third time in May 2020, having agreed a three-year contract.

== International career ==
McCarthy earned two national caps for Ghana and was a player in the squad for the African Nations Cup 2006, and returned for the 2010 African Cup of Nations.

McCarthy was the number one goalkeeper for the local Black Stars when they won silver in the first edition of the 2009 African Nations Championship hosted by Ivory Coast in 2009. He was the hero for the Ghanaian side as his save from Papy Djilobodji paved the way for victory, which was made possible after Kwadwo Poku converted his kick.
