= Josué Doké =

Togolese footballer (born 2004)

Personal information
- Date of birth: 20 April 2004 (age 22)
- Place of birth: Sokodé, Togo
- Height: 1.78 m (5 ft 10 in)
- Position: Forward

Team information
- Current team: JK Narva Trans
- Number: 9

Youth career
- 2020–2021: WAFA
- 2021–2022: Planète Foot Lomé

Senior career*
Years	Team	Apps	(Gls)
2023	Charleroi	2	(0)
2023	Zébra Élites	5	(1)
2023–2024	Be1 NFA	32	(2)
2025–	JK Narva Trans	56	(10)

International career^{‡}
2020–	Togo	4	(0)
- * Club domestic league appearances and goals as of 17 November 2026 ‡ National team caps and goals as of 8 June 2021

Josué Yayra Doké (born 20 April 2004) is a Togolese footballer who plays as a forward for Estonian club JK Narva Trans and the Togo national team. He previously played for Ghana Premier League side WAFA.

== Club career ==
Doké started his career with West African Football Academy in 2019–20.

== International career ==
In October 2020, Doké was handed his maiden call up to the Togo national team by Claude Le Roy at the age of 16 years. He made his debut on 12 October 2020, after coming on in the 79th minute for Gilles Sunu in a friendly match against Sudan. The match ended in a 1–1 draw.

== Career statistics ==
=== International ===
As of match played 8 June 2021

Appearances and goals by national team and year
National team	Year	Apps	Goals
Togo	2020	1	0
Togo	2021	3	0
Total		4	0
