= Amankwah Forson =

Ghanaian footballer (born 2002)

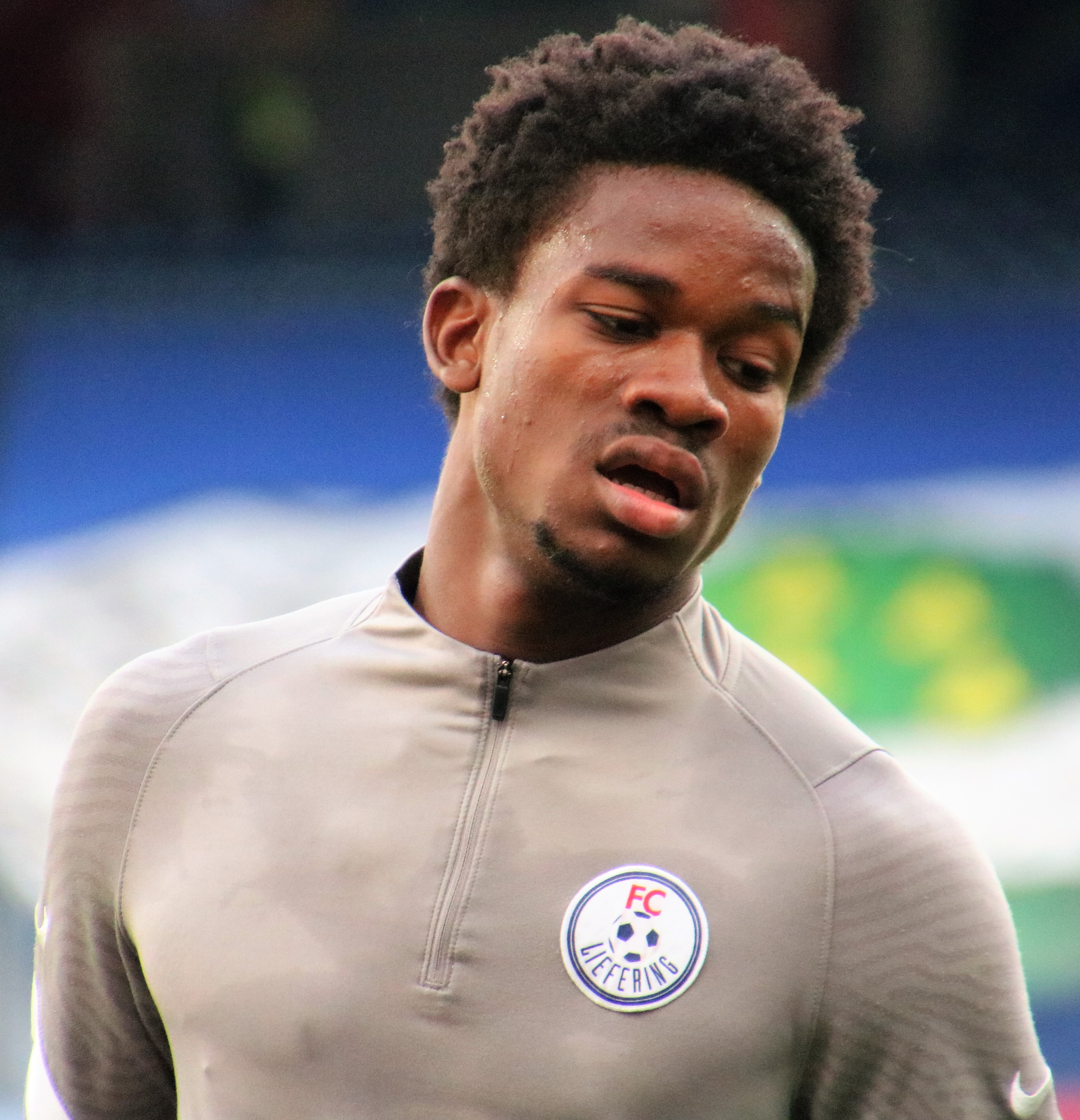
- Forson in 2021

Personal information
- Full name: Amankwah Forson
- Date of birth: 31 December 2002 (age 23)
- Place of birth: Accra, Ghana
- Height: 1.73 m (5 ft 8 in)
- Position: Midfielder

Team information
- Current team: Hapoel Be'er Sheva (on loan from Norwich City)
- Number: 17

Senior career*
Years	Team	Apps	(Gls)
2019–2021	WAFA	16	(1)
2021–2024	Red Bull Salzburg	35	(2)
2021–2022	→ FC Liefering (loan)	29	(6)
2022–2023	→ Rheindorf Altach (loan)	16	(1)
2024–	Norwich City	40	(4)
2026–	→ Hapoel Be'er Sheva (loan)	7	(2)

International career^{‡}
2024–	Ghana	2	(0)
- * Club domestic league appearances and goals as of 04:04, 7 November 2026 (UTC) ‡ National team caps and goals as of 10:55, 19 October 2026 (UTC)

Amankwah Forson (born 31 December 2002) is a Ghanaian professional footballer who plays as a midfielder for Israeli Premier League club Hapoel Be'er Sheva and the Ghana national team, on loan from EFL Championship club Norwich City.

== Club career ==
Forson began his career with WAFA. He made his professional debut in a 2019–20 Ghana Premier League fixture against Karela United on 29 December 2019. He was adjudged man of the match in a 4–3 win match against King Faisal on 15 November 2020

In February 2021, he joined Austrian Bundesliga club FC Red Bull Salzburg and went on loan to FC Liefering.

On 27 June 2022, Forson was sent on a one-season loan to Austrian Bundesliga club Rheindorf Altach.

On 9 August 2024, Forson joined Championship club Norwich City for an undisclosed fee, signing a four-year deal.

=== Hapoel Be'er Sheva ===
On 2 September 2026, Amankwah joined Hapoel Be'er Sheva from the Israeli Premier League on a one-year loan, with an option to purchase for a fee of €2 million.

== International career ==
On 22 March 2024, Forson made his senior international debut for Ghana, featuring in a friendly against Nigeria.

== Career statistics ==
As of match played 2 May 2026

Appearances and goals by club, season and competition
Club	Season	League			National cup (Note: Includes Austrian Cup, FA Cup)		League cup (Note: Includes EFL Cup)		Continental		Other		Total	
Club	Season	Division	Apps	Goals	Apps	Goals	Apps	Goals	Apps	Goals	Apps	Goals	Apps	Goals
WAFA	2019–20	Ghana Premier League	10	1	—		—		—		—		10	1
WAFA	2020–21	Ghana Premier League	6	0	—		—		—		—		6	0
WAFA	Total		16	1	—		—		—		—		16	1
Red Bull Salzburg	2021–22	Austrian Bundesliga	1	0	0	0	—		0	0	—		1	0
Red Bull Salzburg	2022–23	Austrian Bundesliga	12	0	0	0	—		0	0	—		12	0
Red Bull Salzburg	2023–24	Austrian Bundesliga	22	2	2	0	—		4 (Note: Appearances in UEFA Champions League)	0	—		28	2
Red Bull Salzburg	Total		35	2	2	0	—		4	0	—		41	2
FC Liefering (loan)	2020–21	2. Liga	10	3	—		—		—		—		10	3
FC Liefering (loan)	2021–22	2. Liga	19	3	—		—		—		—		19	3
FC Liefering (loan)	Total		29	6	—		—		—		—		29	6
Rheindorf Altach (loan)	2022–23	Austrian Bundesliga	17	1	2	2	—		—		—		19	3
Norwich City	2024–25	EFL Championship	21	2	1	0	2	0	—		—		24	2
Norwich City	2025–26	EFL Championship	19	2	1	0	0	0	—		—		20	2
Norwich City	Total		40	4	2	0	2	0	—		—		44	4
Career total			137	14	6	2	2	0	4	0	0	0	149	16

== Honours ==
FC Liefering

- Austrian Football Second League runner-up: 2020–21
