= Isaac Assibu =

Ghanaian footballer (born 2008

Personal information
- Date of birth: 14 January 2008 (age 18)
- Position: Winger

Team information
- Current team: Malmö FF
- Number: 39

Youth career
- 2022–2026: WAFA

Senior career*
Years	Team	Apps	(Gls)
2026–	Malmö FF	8	(0)
- * Club domestic league appearances and goals as of 13 September 2026

Isaac Assibu (born 14 January 2008) is a Ghanaian professional footballer who plays as a winger for Allsvenskan club Malmö FF.

== Club career ==
Assibu developed within the ranks of Ghanaian club WAFA, before signing with Malmö FF. On 20 July 2026 he made his professional, and Malmö FF, debut in a 2–2 draw against Kalmar FF, coming on as a half-time substitute for Anton Höög. A few days later he extended his contract until the end of 2030.

== Career statistics ==
As of match played 13 September 2026

Appearances and goals by club, season and competition
Club	Season	League			Cup		Europe		Other		Total	
Club	Season	Division	Apps	Goals	Apps	Goals	Apps	Goals	Apps	Goals	Apps	Goals
Malmö FF	2026	Allsvenskan	8	0	1	0	—		—		9	0
Career total			8	0	1	0	0	0	0	0	9	0
