= Mohammed Aminu =

Ghanaian footballer

Personal information
- Date of birth: 10 August 2000 (age 26)
- Place of birth: Mampong, Ghana
- Height: 1.75 m (5 ft 9 in)
- Position: Forward

Youth career
- –2018: WAFA
- 2018–2020: Manchester City
- 2018–2019: → NAC Breda (loan)

Senior career*
Years	Team	Apps	(Gls)
2018	WAFA	5	(3)
2019–2022	Manchester City	0	(0)
2019	→ Dordrecht (loan)	0	(0)
2020–2022	→ Lommel (loan)	0	(0)

International career^{‡}
2017	Ghana U17	3	(0)
- * Club domestic league appearances and goals as of 14:44, 22 October 2020 (UTC) ‡ National team caps and goals as of 14:44, 28 November 2018 (UTC)

Mohammed Aminu (born 10 August 2000) is a Ghanaian professional football player of forward.

== Club career ==
Aminu was first spotted at the 2017 Al Kass Tournament, while representing Red Bull Salzburg, the parent of his club WAFA. After being scouted by the likes of Real Madrid and Bayern Munich, Aminu agreed a deal to join English champions Manchester City in 2017.

In April 2018, after scoring three goals in four games, Aminu was named Ghanaian Premier League Player of the Month.

In October 2020, Aminu and teammate Thomas Agyepong joined Belgian First Division B side Lommel on loan until the end of the 2020–21 season. Like his parent club, Lommel are owned by City Football Group.

== Career statistics ==
=== Club ===
As of 19 January 2020.

Club	Season	League			Cup		Continental		Other		Total	
Club	Season	Division	Apps	Goals	Apps	Goals	Apps	Goals	Apps	Goals	Apps	Goals
WAFA	2018	Ghanaian Premier League	5	3	0	0	0	0	0	0	5	3
Manchester City	2019–20	Premier League	0	0	0	0	0	0	0	0	0	0
Dordrecht (loan)	2019–20	Eerste Divisie	0	0	0	0	—		0	0	0	0
Career total			5	3	0	0	0	0	0	0	5	3
