= Dominic Adiyiah =

Ghanaian footballer (born 1989)

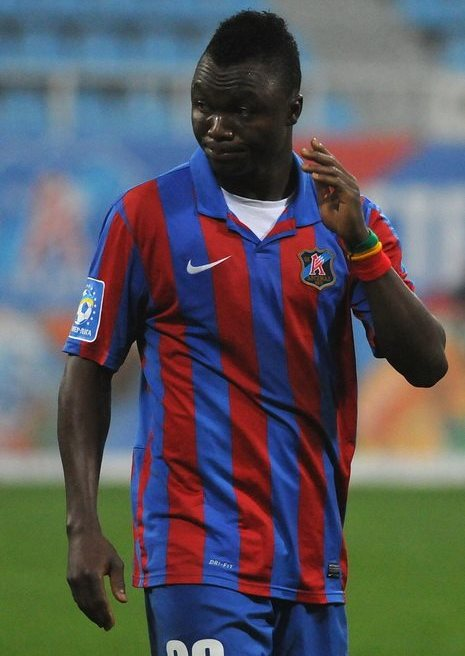
- Adiyiah playing for Arsenal Kyiv in 2013

Personal information
- Full name: Dominic Adiyiah
- Date of birth: 29 November 1989 (age 36)
- Place of birth: Accra, Ghana
- Height: 1.72 m (5 ft 8 in)
- Position: Striker

Youth career
- Feyenoord Ghana

Senior career*
Years	Team	Apps	(Gls)
2006–2007	Feyenoord Ghana		
2007–2008	Heart of Lions		
2008–2010	Fredrikstad	8	(0)
2010–2012	Milan	0	(0)
2010–2011	→ Reggina (loan)	13	(1)
2011	→ Partizan (loan)	6	(0)
2011	→ Karşıyaka (loan)	8	(0)
2012	→ Arsenal Kyiv (loan)	4	(0)
2012–2013	Arsenal Kyiv	36	(7)
2014	Atyrau	14	(1)
2015–2018	Nakhon Ratchasima	96	(19)
2019	Sisaket	22	(6)
2020–2021	Chiangmai United	11	(1)

International career^{‡}
2008–2009	Ghana U-20	7	(8)
2009–2013	Ghana	20	(4)
Medal record
Football
FK Partizan
Winner	Serbian SuperLiga	2011
Winner	Serbian Cup	2011
Ghana
Winner	FIFA U-20 World Cup	2009
Winner	African Youth Championship	2009
Runner-up	Africa Cup of Nations	2010
- * Club domestic league appearances and goals as of 12:25, 31 May 2021 (UTC) ‡ National team caps and goals as of 15 April 2014

Dominic Adiyiah (born 29 November 1989) is a Ghanaian former professional footballer who played as a striker.

== Club career ==
=== Early career ===
Adiyiah began his football career at Feyenoord Ghana. He spent several years in Gomoa Fetteh, where the academy is based, before transferring to Heart of Lions in 2007. After making his debut in the Ghana Premier League with the club based in Kpandu, at the end of the 2007–08 season he was named Most Exciting Player of the league.

=== Fredrikstad ===
In August 2008, Adiyiah made the move to Europe, being signed by Norwegian top flight club Fredrikstad for a fee of £100,000 (approx. €125,000 as of that date). He made his debut for the club in an away match against Aalesund, on 30 August. He went scoreless in four appearances during the 2008 season, as the team finished second in the league.

The following season, he scored twice during the training camp, but did not scored in the four league matches he appeared. He also made his debut in the Europa League, in the second leg of the third qualifying round against Lech Poznań.

=== AC Milan ===
In late October 2009, after impressing in the U-20 World Cup, Adiyiah was reported to be close to joining Serie A club A.C. Milan. Speculation increased as Fredrikstad announced they had received a bid €500,000 for the young striker from a big European club. The rumour was eventually confirmed by Milan CEO Adriano Galliani on 1 November, and six days later the Ghanaian signed his new contract, as he had passed routine medical examinations.

The move was ratified on 2 January 2010, the first day of the winter transfer window. However Adiyiah was still not able to play, since he was called up by the Ghana national team to take part in the African Nations Cup. Upon his return, a month later, he also secured an Italian work permit, which he was still lacking, thus becoming definitively eligible to play. Despite this, he was never selected by head coach Leonardo during the remainder of the 2009–10 season. On 25 June 2012, Adiyiah completed a three-year contract with Arsenal Kyiv, ending his three years career with AC Milan.

=== Partizan (loan) ===
Subsequently, Adiyiah was sent to Serbian SuperLiga club Partizan on another loan deal until the end of the season where he joined his national teammate Prince Tagoe.

=== Karşıyaka (loan) ===
In the 2011 summer transfer window he signed a loan-deal with Karşıyaka who play in Bank Asya 1. Lig, Turkey's second-tier league.

=== Arsenal Kyiv ===
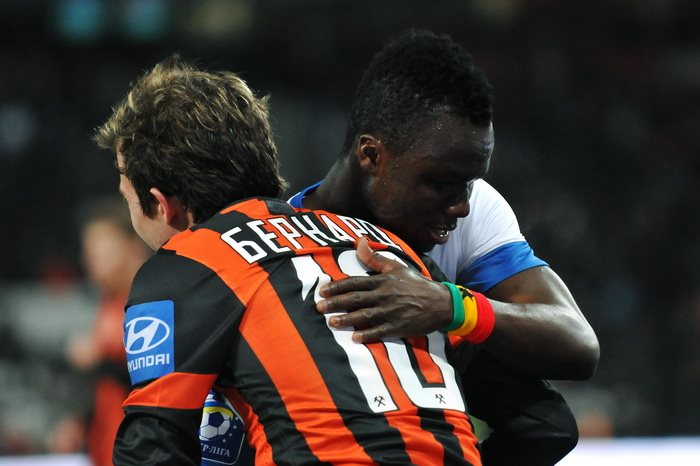
Adiyiah with Bernard in 2013.

However, in February 2012 he was called back from Karşıyaka, due to lack of playing time and loaned to Ukrainian Premier League side Arsenal Kyiv. On 25 June 2012, Adiyiah completed a three-year contract with Arsenal Kyiv, after spending three years with AC Milan.

=== Atyrau ===
In June 2014, Adiyiah signed for Kazakhstan Premier League side FC Atyrau.

=== Nakhon Ratchasima ===
In February 2015, Adiyiah signed for Thai Premier League side Nakhon Ratchasima F.C. After a successful season where Nakon Ratchasima reached 8th place Adiyiah announced that he would be leaving the club at the end of his contract. He later changed his mind however and agreed to stay at Nakhon Ratchasima for another season.

== International career ==
=== Ghana U-20 ===
Adiyiah started to be called up by the Black Satellites in 2008, making his debut on 30 March, in a match against Niger, and also participating in the WAFU U-20 Championship. The following year, he was part of the squad that won the African Youth Championship. His successful 2009 was not over: in October, he took part also in the U-20 World Cup held in Egypt; as the team went on winning the trophy, he was awarded the Golden Shoe for the top-scorer with 8 goals in 7 games and was also named the Most Valuable Player of the tournament.

=== Ghana ===
Adiyiah earned his first call-up with the Black Stars on 3 November 2009, shortly after the U-20 triumph, for a World Cup qualification match against Mali, to be played on 15 November. However, he was left as an unused substitute. He did make his senior debut three days later though, in a friendly against Angola. In January 2010, he was part of the Ghanaian team that reached the final at the African Nations Cup. Despite making only two substitute appearances, he showed glimpses of a player for the future.

In June of the same year, Adiyiah was called up to take part in the upcoming World Cup, to be played in South Africa. He made his debut in the competition during the last match of the group stage against Germany, coming off the bench for the final minutes. After being left as an unused substitute in the round of 16, he was sent on in the quarter-finals against Uruguay. In the very last minute of extra time, Adiyiah's header was saved on the line by Uruguayan striker Luis Suárez, who palmed the ball away with both his hands, resulting in a penalty kick for Ghana and Suarez being sent off. However, Asamoah Gyan smashed the penalty against the bar and the game went to the shootout. Adiyiah took the fourth penalty with his team trailing 2–3, but had his shot saved; Sebastián Abreu seized the chance by subsequently scoring the deciding penalty for Uruguay.

== Career statistics ==
=== International ===
As of match played on 9 June 2012.

Appearances and goals by national team and year
National team	Year	Apps	Goals
Ghana	2009–10	8	0
Ghana	2010–11	7	2
Ghana	2011–12	3	2
Total		18	4

== Honours ==
Partizan

- Serbian SuperLiga: 2010–11
- Serbian Cup: 2010–11

Ghana U20

- FIFA U-20 World Cup: 2009
- African Youth Championship: 2009

Ghana

- Africa Cup of Nations runner-up: 2010

Individual

- Ghana Premier League Most Exciting Player: 2007–08
- FIFA U-20 World Cup Golden Ball: 2009
- FIFA U-20 World Cup Golden Shoe: 2009
- CAF Young Player of the Year: 2009
- Ghana Player of the Year: 2009
