= Michael Kyei Dwamena =

Ghanaian professional footballer

Personal information
- Date of birth: 16 October 1999 (age 27)
- Place of birth: Ghana
- Position: Midfielder

Team information
- Current team: WAFA
- Number: 5

Senior career*
Years	Team	Apps	(Gls)
2020–	WAFA	11	(0)
- * Club domestic league appearances and goals as of 7 July 2021

Michael Kyei Dwamena (born 16 October 1999) is a Ghanaian footballer who currently plays as a midfielder for Ghana Premier League side WAFA.

== Education ==
Dwamena holds a first degree in environmental science from the University for Development Studies (UDS). He is currently pursuing a Master of Philosophy degree (MPhil) in Environmental Science at the University of Cape Coast (UCC). He captained UCC football team to win the 2019 University Games hosted by the University of Ghana, Legon. During the games he was scouted by then WAFA coach Prosper Narteh Ogum and drafted into the team for the 2020–21 season.

== Career ==
Dwamena started his Ghana Premier League career with West African Football Academy in July 2020. He made his debut on 15 November 2020 starting the 4–3 victory over King Faisal Babes. He started ten league matches and came off the bench for one match before sustaining an injury in 5–0 home victory over Liberty Professionals on 31 January 2021. He was ruled out for the remainder of the season and underwent a surgery.
