= Jamal Haruna =

Ghanaian footballer (born 2001)

Personal information
- Date of birth: 13 July 2001 (age 25)
- Place of birth: Kumasi, Ghana
- Position: Midfielder

Senior career*
Years	Team	Apps	(Gls)
2017–2019	WAFA	26	(3)
2019–2023	Bordeaux B	27	(0)
- * Club domestic league appearances and goals as of 09:16, 28 December 2023 (UTC)

Jamal Haruna (born 13 July 2001) is a Ghanaian professional footballer who plays as a midfielder.

== Club career ==
=== WAFA ===
Haruna started his professional career with West African Football Academy (WAFA), he was promoted to the senior team in May 2017.

He made his debut during the 2017 season. On 28 May 2017, he made his debut after coming on in the 86th minute to replace Majeed Ashimeru in a 1–0 defeat to International Allies. He ended the season with 5 league matches as WAFA were runner-up trailing league champions Aduana Stars by 6 points. On 4 June 2017, he came on in the 85th minute to have a cameo appearance in their record 5–0 massive victory over GPL giants Accra Hearts of Oak. In August 2017, he went on a trial at German giants Bayern Munich.

During the 2018 season he played a more important role by featuring in 8 league matches for WAFA, before the league was abandoned due to the dissolution of the GFA in June 2018, as a result of the Anas Number 12 Expose. He rose to prominence during the 2019 GFA Normalization Committee Special Competition, which he played 13 out of 14 matches played, scored 3 goals and won 4 man of the match awards in the process. Amongst the three goals was his debut goal, scoring the first goal in a 3–2 victory over Accra Hearts of Oak. At the end of the match he was adjudged the man of the match. His next set of goals came in after putting a man of the match performance for WAFA to score a brace against Dreams FC which secured a 3–1 victory for WAFA. His performances attracted both local suitors and foreign clubs who showed interest in signing him, he however joined French club Bordeaux.

=== Bordeaux ===
In July 2019, Haruna was signed by Bordeaux on a 4-year deal and was set to stay with club until June 2023. He was assigned to the reserves side, and further went on to make his debut for the side on 17 August 2019 in a 2–0 victory over Bayonne.

== International career ==
From 2016 to 2017, Haruna was part of the Ghana national under-17 football squad. He was promoted to the under-20 side in 2019.
