= Marvin Owusu =

Ghanaian professional footballer

Personal information
- Date of birth: 11 July 2003 (age 23)
- Place of birth: Ghana
- Position: Forward

Team information
- Current team: WAFA
- Number: 9

Senior career*
Years	Team	Apps	(Gls)
2019–	WAFA	10	(1)
- * Club domestic league appearances and goals as of 7 July 2021

Marvin Owusu (born 11 July 2003) is a Ghanaian footballer who currently plays as a forward for Ghana Premier League side WAFA.

== Career ==
Owusu started his career with West African Football Academy, he was promoted to the senior team in October 2019 ahead of the 2019–20 Ghana Premier League season. On 12 January 2020 in a goalless draw against Elmina Sharks, he was brought on in the 69th minute to for Eric Asamany make his debut. The following match he started his first match in a goalless draw against Accra Hearts of Oak. He subsequently played one more match before the league was halted and later cancelled due to the COVID-19 pandemic in Ghana, ending his season with three league appearances. He was given the number 9 jersey and named on the squad list ahead of the 2020–21 season. He scored his professional debut goal on 31 January 2021, scoring the 2nd goal from an Augustine Boakye assist to help WAFA to a 5–0 victory over Liberty Professionals. He ended his season with seven league matches and scored one goal.
