= Lower Volta Bridge =

Bridge in Ghana

Coordinates: 5°59′41.6″N 0°35′05.2″E

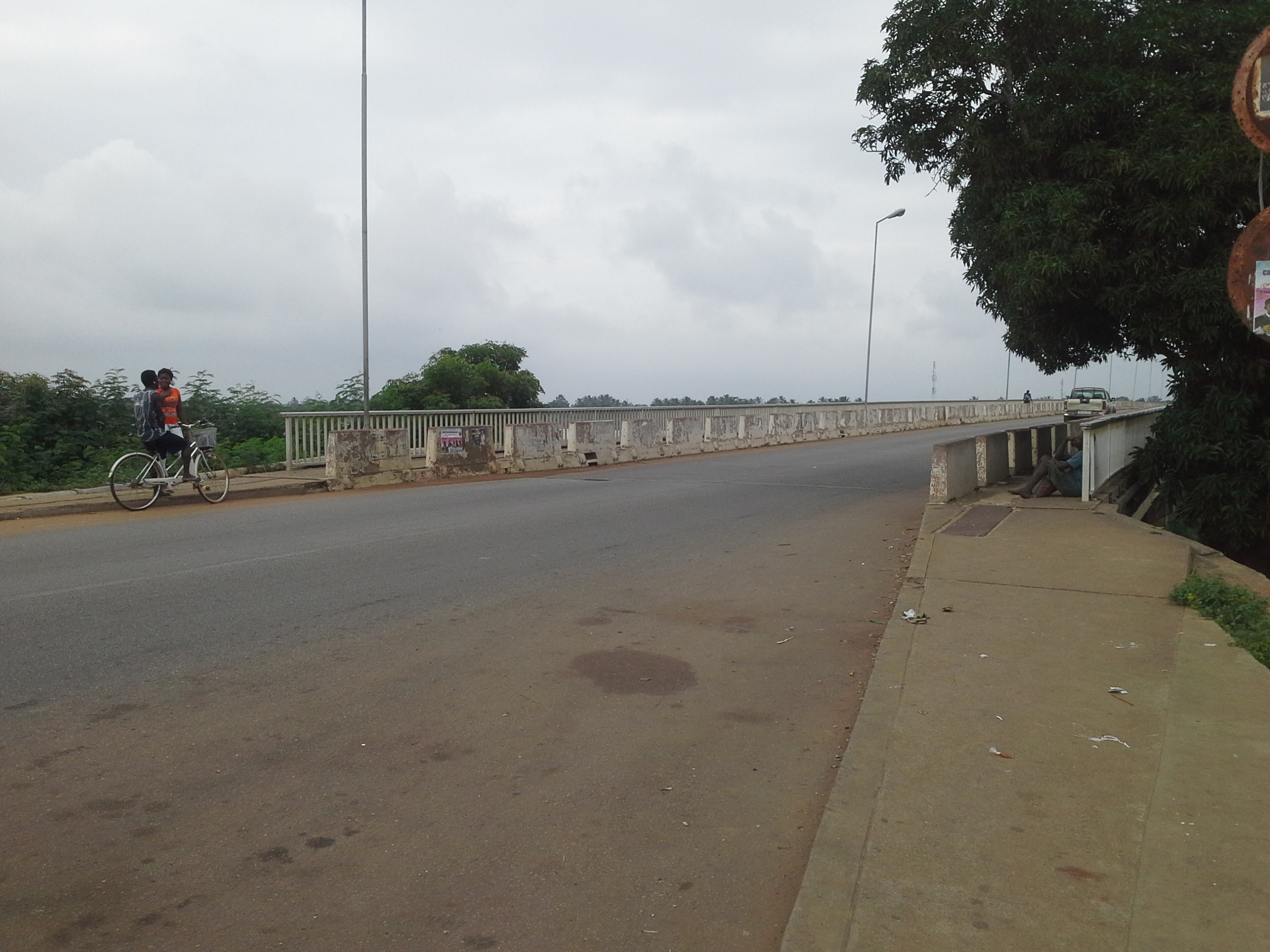
View of bridge from Sogakope side

The Lower Volta Bridge (French: Pont de la basse Volta), also known as Sogakope Bridge (French: Pont de Sogakope), is a 650 meter long bridge on the N1 highway (Aflao — Accra) that connects Sogakope to Sokpoe over the Volta River.

== History ==
The bridge was constructed between January 1965 and January 1967 by two German contractors.

Over the decades, the bridge suffered from poor maintenance and increasing traffic, especially heavy trucks, making it dangerous for drivers. By 2009, locals were already calling it a "death trap," with concerns over rusting joints and deteriorating sealants. In 2013, there was also an appeal by the residents of Sogakope to Ghana Highways Authority to repair the rusting expansion and contraction joints. Despite calls for repairs, only minor fixes were made, and the bridge's structural integrity continued to decline. In 2018, the government promised repairs, but reports in 2019 showed ongoing accidents, with motorcyclists being the primary victims. After a local politician's murder in 2020, protests erupted, with residents blocking the bridge.

Ghana Government is planning to build a new cable-stayed bridge (New Volta Bridge) to be started in 2021.
