= Faad Sana =

Togolese footballer

Personal information
- Date of birth: 15 April 2003 (age 23)
- Place of birth: Burkina Faso
- Position: Right-back

Team information
- Current team: Mura
- Number: 2

Youth career
- Planète Foot Lomé

Senior career*
Years	Team	Apps	(Gls)
2021–2024	Planète Foot Lomé		
2021–2022	→ WAFA (loan)	19	(0)
2024–2025	Wolfsberger AC II	0	(0)
2025	→ Mura (loan)	10	(0)
2025–	Mura	36	(0)

International career^{‡}
2021	Burkina Faso U20	2	(0)
2026–	Togo	2	(0)
- * Club domestic league appearances and goals as of 22:36, 10 November 2026 (UTC) ‡ National team caps and goals as of 01:12, 8 June 2026 (UTC)

Faad Sana (born 15 April 2003) is a professional footballer who plays as a right-back for Slovenian PrvaLiga club Mura. Born in Burkina Faso, he plays for the Togo national team.

== Club career ==
Sana began his career at Planète Foot Lomé in Togo before joining WAFA in Ghana on loan in October 2021, where he made 19 appearances in the Ghana Premier League in 2021–22. He returned to Planète Foot Lomé before joining Wolfsberger AC II in Austria in September 2024, where he trained with the amateur side during the autumn.

In February 2025, Wolfsberger AC announced that Sana would join Mura on loan until the end of the season to gain first-team experience in the Slovenian PrvaLiga. He made 10 appearances during the loan spell and impressed sufficiently for Mura to make the transfer permanent. In May 2025, Mura announced they had signed Sana on a two-year contract, with club president Robert Kuzmič describing him as a player who had shown from his very first appearance that he brought energy and character to the team, praising his pace, combativeness and aggression as the qualities the club was building around for the future. He went on to make 21 league appearances in 2025–26.

== International career ==
Although born and raised in Burkina Faso, Sana was eligible to represent Togo through his mother. He played for the Burkina Faso U20s at the 2021 U-20 Africa Cup of Nations. He was contacted by the Burkina Faso coaching staff and gave his initial consent to be included in their senior national squad for the March 2026 FIFA window, but withdrew at the last minute, opting instead to represent Togo. Burkina Faso head coach Amir Abdou confirmed the development at a press conference on 23 March 2026, saying he could only wonder at Sana's decision and wishing him well for the future.

Sana made his senior debut for Togo on 27 March 2026, appearing in a 2–2 friendly draw against Guinea in Rabat, Morocco, before earning a second cap in a 1–0 friendly win against Niger on 31 March 2026.
