= Sokpoe =

- Town
- Location in Ghana
- Coordinates: 5°59′0″N 0°35′0″E
- Country: Ghana
- Region: Volta Region
- District: South Tongu District
- Time zone: GMT
  - Summer (DST): GMT

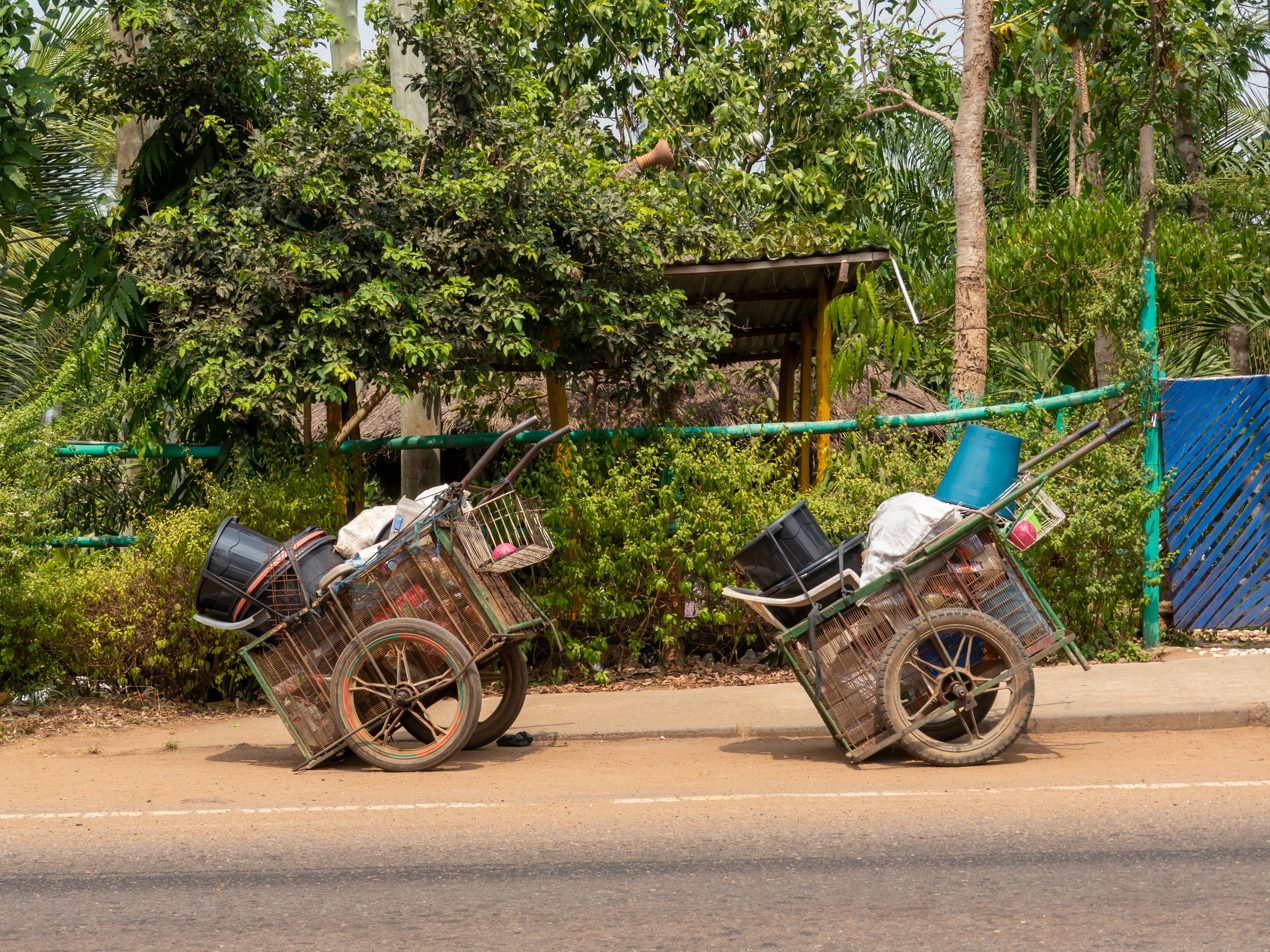
Hand carts in Sokpoe

Sokpoe is a small town located near Sogakope in the Volta Region of Ghana.

== Geography ==
Sokpoe lies on the west bank of the Volta River. The Lower Volta Bridge connects Sokpoe directly to Sogakope.
