= Isaac Boakye (footballer, born 1997) =

Ghanaian footballer (born 1997)

Personal information
- Date of birth: 20 March 1997 (age 29)
- Place of birth: Accra, Ghana
- Height: 1.76 m (5 ft 9 in)
- Position: Forward

Team information
- Current team: Fafe
- Number: 77

Youth career
- WAFA

Senior career*
Years	Team	Apps	(Gls)
2016–2018	Portimonense SC	0	(0)
2016–2017	→ Farense (loan)	13	(1)
2017–2018	→ Almancilense (loan)	25	(2)
2018–2020	Olímpico Montijo	29	(5)
2019–2020	→ Leça (loan)	22	(6)
2020–2021	Příbram	6	(0)
2021–2022	Canelas	38	(4)
2022	Académica	6	(0)
2023–	Fafe	14	(1)
- * Club domestic league appearances and goals as of 20:55, 4 June 2023 (UTC)

Isaac Boakye (born 20 March 1997) is a Ghanaian professional footballer who plays as a winger for AD Fafe. He previously featured for S.C. Farense, S.R. Almancilense, Leça F.C. all in the Campeonato de Portugal, and 1. FK Příbram in the Czech First League.

== Career ==
=== Portimonense S.C. ===
Born in Accra, Boakye started his career playing in the U-19 team of West African Football Academy (WAFA). He secured a move to Portugal and joined Portimonense SC in July 2016. The following month, he was immediately sent on a season long loan to SC Farense. He made his debut on 18 September 2016 after coming on in the 64th minute for André Vieira in a 1–0 victory over Louletano. He went on a made 13 league appearances and scored 1 goal that season before returning to Portimonense. He was sent on another season-long loan to S.R. Almancilense for the 2017–18 season. At the end of the loan deal, he made 25 league appearances and scored 2 goals.

=== Olímpico Montijo ===
In July 2018, Boakye moved to Olímpico Montijo on a free transfer ahead of the 2018–19 season. On 12 August 2018, he made his debut after playing 84 minutes of a 4–0 victory over Vasco da Gama Vidigueira. The following month, he scored his debut goal against Casa Pia, scoring an equalizer in the 78th minute after Gonçalo Gregório has scored in the 75th minute. The match later ended in a 2–1 loss to Montijo as Gonçalo Gregório scored a late goal in the 86th minute. On 20 January 2019, Boakye scored an early goal in the 5th minute to catapult Monitijo to a 4–0 victory over Vasco da Gama Vidigueira. He ended the season with 29 league appearances and scored 5 goals, the most in his career in terms of appearances and goals.

=== Leça FC ===
The following season, Boakye joined fellow Campeonato de Portugal side Leça FC. On his debut match against Castro Daire on 18 August 2019, he scored the first goal in the 33rd minute to push them to a 3–1 victory. At the end of the season, he made 22 league appearances, made 4 assists and scored 6 goals, one goal better than his previous season.

=== Příbram ===
Boakye's performances in the lower league in Portugal secured him a deal to Czech First League club 1. FK Příbram in August 2020 on a free transfer. He signed a three-year deal with the Czech Republic-based team. Boakye made his debut 22 August 2018, after coming on in the 67th minute for Jonas Vais, in a match which saw his fellow Ghanaian compatriot Emmanuel Antwi playing the full 90 minutes. He scored his only goal for the club in the 2020–21 Czech Cup third round match against FC Hradec Králové on 9 October 2020, equalizing in the 75th minute to push them into extra time, which Příbram lost 2–1 and were eliminated. He left the club in February 2021, forgoing the remaining two years on his contract.

=== Canelas 2010 ===
Boakye joined CF Canelas 2010 on 5 February 2021. Five days later, he made his debut in 2–0 victory over Beira-Mar, coming on in the 62nd minute for Francisco Sousa. He was an important figure in the first team during his two seasons spell before leaving in 2022. He played 38 league matches and scored 4 goals in that period.

=== Académica ===
In July 2022, Boakye signed for Académica in the Liga 3.
