= Sampson Agyapong =

Ghanaian footballer

Personal information
- Date of birth: 1 September 2002 (age 24)
- Position: Winger

Senior career*
Years	Team	Apps	(Gls)
2019–2022	WAFA	11	(2)
2022–2024	Al Ain	0	(0)
2024	Gulf United	8	(1)

International career
- Ghana U17
- * Club domestic league appearances and goals as of 17:44, 12 April 2020 (UTC)

Sampson Agyapong (born 1 September 2002) is a Ghanaian footballer who currently plays as a forward.

He made his professional debut in a Normalisation Committee Special Competition fixture against Elmina Sharks on 15 May 2019.

== Honours ==
Al Ain

- AFC Champions League: 2023–24
