= Omar Sise =

Gambian footballer (born 1978)

Personal information
- Full name: Omar K Sise
- Date of birth: 25 April 1978 (age 48)
- Place of birth: Sukuta, The Gambia
- Position: Forward

Senior career*
Years	Team	Apps	(Gls)
1998–1999	NK Celje		

Managerial career
- 2013: Sheikh Jamal Dhanmondi Club
- 2013–2014: Feni SC
- 2015–2017: Gambia U20
- 2023–: Brothers Union
- * Club domestic league appearances and goals

Omar K Sise (born 25 April 1978) is a Gambian football manager and former footballer who manages Brothers Union.

== Playing career ==
A native of the Lower River Division, The Gambia, Sise played as a forward. Growing up, he attended Pakalinding Upper Basic School in The Gambia and played for their football team. In 1998, he signed for Slovenian side NK Celje.

== Managerial career ==
In 2013, Sise was appointed manager of Bangladeshi side Sheikh Jamal Dhanmondi Club. The same year, he was appointed manager of Bangladeshi side Feni SC, helping the club reach the final of the 2014 Independence Cup, the first time they went that far in a major tournament. Subsequently, he was appointed manager of the Gambia national under-20 football team in 2015. Eight years later, he was appointed manager of Bangladeshi side Brothers Union.
