= Mohammed Abubakari =

Ghanaian footballer

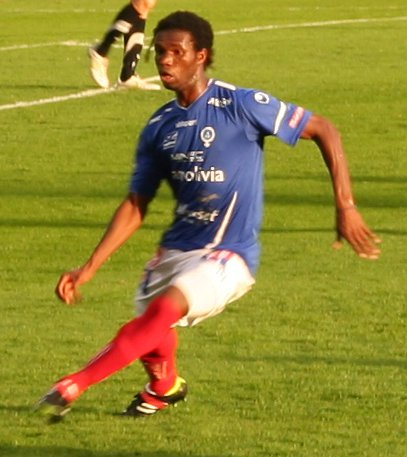

Personal information
- Date of birth: 15 February 1986 (age 40)
- Place of birth: Kumasi, Ghana
- Height: 1.78 m (5 ft 10 in)
- Position: Midfielder

Youth career
- 2000–2004: Feyenoord Academy Ghana
- 2004–2006: Feyenoord

Senior career*
Years	Team	Apps	(Gls)
2006–2007	Feyenoord	0	(0)
2007–2009	Panserraikos	54	(3)
2009–2010	PAOK	1	(0)
2010	→ Levadiakos (loan)	12	(1)
2010	→ Panserraikos (loan)	18	(1)
2011	AEL	3	(1)
2011–2012	Doxa Drama	20	(0)
2012–2014	Åtvidabergs FF	58	(4)
2015–2017	BK Häcken	77	(2)
2018–2020	Helsingborgs IF	77	(4)
2021–2022	IFK Mariehamn	38	(5)
2023	Spvgg 09 Buggingen/Seefelden	7	(1)
2023–	FC Heitersheim	39	(52)
- * Club domestic league appearances and goals as of 28 April 2025 2022

Mohammed Abubakari (born 15 February 1986) is a Ghanaian footballer who plays as a midfielder.

== Career ==
Abubakari previously played for Fetteh Football Academy in Ghana and for Dutch side Feyenoord. He became the first player who moved from Ghanaian farmer team Feyenoord Academy to the Dutch side Feyenoord on 17 February 2006. After just eighteen months he left Feyenoord for Greece and promoted club Panserraikos signed him on a two-year deal until 30 June 2009. On 4 May 2009, he agreed to join PAOK on a free transfer signing a four-year contract. He was on loan to Panserraikos until December 2010.

In 2012, he moved to the Swedish Allsvenskan club Åtvidabergs FF. After three seasons he left lower-side Åtvidabergs FF. Abubakari moved to Allsvenskan team BK Häcken in January 2015 as a free agent. Ahead of the 2018 season, Abubakari signed a three-year deal (with an option for a further) with Helsingborgs IF in Superettan.

On 17 February 2022, Abubakari renewed his contract with IFK Mariehamn for the 2022 season. After its completion he moved to Germany and signed a contract at Spvgg 09 Buggingen/Seefelden for the rest of the season 2022/23. In summer 2023 he joined FC Heitersheim.
