= Richmond Lamptey =

Ghanaian footballer (born 1997)

Personal information
- Full name: Richmond Nii Lamptey
- Date of birth: 18 March 1997 (age 29)
- Place of birth: Accra, Ghana
- Height: 1.79 m (5 ft 10 in)
- Position: Midfielder

Team information
- Current team: Al-Ittihad Misurata
- Number: 11

Youth career
- 2008–2015: WAFA

Senior career*
Years	Team	Apps	(Gls)
2015–2017	WAFA	46	(4)
2018–2021	International Allies	50	(4)
2019	→ Salam Zgharta (loan)	8	(0)
2021–2024	Asante Kotoko	68	(4)
2024–2025	APR		
2025–	Al-Ittihad Misurata		

International career
2021	Ghana	1	(0)
- * Club domestic league appearances and goals

Richmond Nii Lamptey (born 18 March 1997) is a Ghanaian professional footballer who plays as a midfielder for Libyan club Al-Ittihad Misurata. He has also represented the Ghana national football team.

Lamptey began his senior career with WAFA, helping the club finish runners-up in the 2017 Ghana Premier League, before joining Inter Allies in 2018. He spent part of 2019 on loan with Lebanese club Salam Zgharta before returning to Inter Allies. In 2021, he joined Asante Kotoko, where he won the 2021–22 Ghana Premier League. After three seasons with Kotoko, he moved to Rwanda to join APR FC in 2024, winning the Rwanda Premier League and Peace Cup during the 2024–25 season. He subsequently joined Al-Ittihad Misurata in 2025.

At international level, Lamptey represented Ghana's home-based national team and was part of the side that won the 2017 WAFU Cup of Nations. He was later selected for Ghana's final 27-man squad for the 2023 Africa Cup of Nations in Ivory Coast.

== Club career ==
=== WAFA ===
Lamptey developed at the West African Football Academy (WAFA) before progressing to the club's senior team. He established himself in the first team during the 2016 Ghana Premier League season, making 20 league appearances and scoring three goals.

During the 2017 season, Lamptey made 26 league appearances, scoring once and providing five assists as WAFA finished second in the Ghana Premier League, the club's highest league finish at the time. His performances also earned him selection to Ghana's home-based national team during the year, including for the 2018 African Nations Championship qualification campaign and the 2017 WAFU Cup of Nations.

Lamptey left WAFA following the expiration of his contract at the end of the 2017 season and subsequently joined Inter Allies on a free transfer in January 2018, ending a nine-year stint with the club.

=== Inter Allies ===
In January 2018, Lamptey joined Inter Allies on a three-year contract following the expiration of his contract with WAFA. He made 13 league appearances during his first season with the club, scoring once and providing one assist.

In February 2019, Lamptey joined Lebanese club Salam Zgharta on loan for the remainder of the 2018–19 Lebanese Premier League season. He made eight league appearances during his spell in Lebanon before returning to Inter Allies at the end of the loan.

Following his return to Ghana, Lamptey continued with Inter Allies and featured during the 2019–20 Ghana Premier League season and was appointed captain. He subsequently became a key member of the team during the 2020–21 season, making 30 league appearances, scoring three goals and providing two assists. He also received four man-of-the-match awards during the campaign.

On 29 November 2020, Lamptey scored with a long-range strike to secure a 1–0 league victory over Hearts of Oak. He was named man of the match for his performance. Inter Allies were relegated from the Ghana Premier League at the end of the season.

Following an investigation into the July 2021 league match between Inter Allies and AshantiGold, Lamptey was charged by the Ghana Football Association with breaches of its Premier League Regulations and Code of Ethics. He was subsequently handed a 30-month ban from football-related activities. Lamptey appealed the decision to the Court of Arbitration for Sport (CAS). In July 2023, CAS upheld his appeal and set aside the GFA Appeals Committee decision with respect to Lamptey, thereby annulling the sanction imposed on him.

=== Asante Kotoko ===
In September 2021, Lamptey joined Asante Kotoko on a three-year contract from Inter Allies, becoming the club's first signing under head coach Prosper Narteh Ogum.

Lamptey became a regular member of the Kotoko midfield during the 2021–22 season. He made 24 league appearances and scored three goals as Kotoko won the Ghana Premier League title. The league triumph was his first major club honour with Kotoko.

During the 2022–23 season, Lamptey made 27 league appearances and scored once as Kotoko finished fourth in the league. He also featured for the club in the 2022–23 CAF Champions League.

Lamptey remained an important member of the team during the 2023–24 season, making 17 league appearances as Kotoko finished sixth. He also provided five assists during the campaign.

In June 2024, Lamptey and Asante Kotoko reached a mutual agreement to terminate his contract, with approximately two months remaining on the deal. He left the club after three seasons, having helped Kotoko win the 2021–22 Ghana Premier League title.

=== APR FC ===
In July 2024, Lamptey joined APR FC of the Rwanda Premier League on a two-year contract following his departure from Asante Kotoko. Shortly after joining the club, Lamptey was included in APR's squad for the 2024 CECAFA Kagame Interclub Cup in Tanzania. APR reached the final of the competition.

During the 2024–25 season, Lamptey was part of the APR side that won the Rwanda Premier League and the Peace Cup. APR also won the Heroes Cup during the season.

In September 2025, APR announced that it had reached an agreement with Libyan club Al-Ittihad Misurata SC for the permanent transfer of Lamptey, bringing his spell in Rwanda to an end after one season.

== International career ==
Lamptey represented Ghana at youth level before becoming involved with the country's home-based senior national team. In May 2017, he was called up to the Black Stars B squad as the team prepared for the 2018 African Nations Championship qualifiers and the WAFU Cup of Nations.

In July 2017, Lamptey scored for the Black Stars B in a 2–1 friendly victory over Togo in Lomé. He subsequently remained with the squad for Ghana's 2018 African Nations Championship qualifying campaign against Burkina Faso.

Lamptey was later selected for Ghana's squad for the 2017 WAFU Cup of Nations, which was hosted in Ghana. The Black Stars B won the tournament after defeating Nigeria 4–1 in the final.

Lamptey later progressed to the Ghana senior national team. In January 2024, he was named by head coach Chris Hughton in Ghana's 27-man squad for the 2023 Africa Cup of Nations in Ivory Coast.

== Honours ==
Asante Kotoko

- Ghana Premier League: 2021–22

APR FC

- Rwanda Premier League: 2024–25
- Peace Cup: 2024–25
- CECAFA Kagame Cup runner-up: 2024

Ghana

- WAFU Cup of Nations: 2017
