= Abdul Nafiu Idrissu =

Ghanaian footballer

Abdul Idrissu
Personal information
- Full name: Abdul-Nafiu Idrissu
- Date of birth: June 12, 1991 (age 35)
- Place of birth: Tamale, Ghana
- Position: Striker

Team information
- Current team: SM Sanga Balende
- Number: 22

Youth career
- Fetteh Feyenoord

Senior career*
Years	Team	Apps	(Gls)
2003–2007	Feyenoord Youth		
2009	ASEC Mimosas		(13)
2010	Dhafra		(6)
2010–2011	Sharjah FC		(8)
- Feyenoord Academy
2011–2012	Asante Kotoko F.C.		(9)
2012–2014	Amidaus Professionals		
2015–2018	SM Sanga Balende		
- * Club domestic league appearances and goals as of June 1, 2009

Abdul Nafiu Idrissu (born June 12, 1991, in Tamale) is a Ghanaian football striker who currently plays for SM Sanga Balende.

== Career ==
Idrissu played professional for Sharjah FC.
