= Youssifou Atté =

Togolese professional footballer

Personal information
- Date of birth: 16 May 1996 (age 30)
- Place of birth: Lomé, Togo
- Height: 1.80 m (5 ft 11 in)
- Position: Defender

Team information
- Current team: ASEC Mimosas

Senior career*
Years	Team	Apps	(Gls)
2017–2021	WAFA	65	(2)
2022	Legon Cities	8	(1)
2022–2024	TP Mazembe		
2024–	ASEC Mimosas		

International career^{‡}
2020–	Togo	19	(0)
- * Club domestic league appearances and goals as of 17 January 2023 ‡ National team caps and goals as of 18 February 2026

Youssifou Atté (born 16 May 1996) is a Togolese professional footballer who plays as a defender for ASEC Mimosas.

== Career ==
Atté started his career with West African Football Academy, he was promoted to the senior team in December 2017. He made his debut on 17 March 2018, after playing the full 90 minutes in a 1–1 draw to Asante Kotoko. He played 14 league matches in his debut season, before the league was cancelled due to the controversies around the Anas Number 12 Expose. During the 2019 GFA Normalization Competition, he made 12 appearances. He continued to be the first choice right-back and relevant member of the team during the truncated 2019–20 season as he played all 15 league matches before the league was cut short due to the COVID-19 pandemic in Ghana.

== International career ==
In March 2020, he was handed his maiden call up into the Togo national team by Claude Le Roy after consistent performances for WAFA. The call up was ahead AFCON 2021 double header qualifier matches against Egypt. He made senior debut on 29 March 2021, after coming on at half time for Yendoutié Nane in an AFCON 2021 qualifier against Kenya. The match ended in a 2–1 loss.

== Career statistics ==
=== International ===
As of match played 17 November 2024

Appearances and goals by national team and year
National team	Year	Apps	Goals
Togo	2021	8	0
Togo	2022	4	0
Togo	2024	5	0
Total		17	0
