= Sam Arday =

Ghanaian football manager

Personal information
- Date of birth: 2 November 1945
- Place of birth: Accra, Ghana
- Date of death: 12 February 2017 (aged 71)

Managerial career
- Years: Team
- 1991: Ghana U20
- 1992–1997: Ghana U23
- 1996–1997: Ghana
- 2004: Ghana
- 2004–2005: Ashanti Gold

Sam Arday (2 November 1945 – 12 February 2017) was a Ghanaian football coach who has managed the Ghana national side on two occasions – from 1996 to 1997, and again in 2004. He retired from the police service where his last position was a Superintendent. He was the originator of the 'multi system' technique of football, which involved playing all attack and all defense simultaneously. This was executed by switching among the 4-3-3, 4-2-3-1 and the 4-4-2 formations. He was a scout for the Black Stars prior to the 2006 World Cup in Germany and again when Akwasi Appiah was the coach of the team.

== Coaching career ==
Arday was the coach of Ghana Olympic Team, which won the Olympic Bronze Soccer Medal at Barcelona '92, the first for an African country, and coach of Ghana national under-20 football team. The Black Satellites won the Bronze Medal at 1991 Africa Youth Championship in Egypt after beating Zambia 2:0 in the 3rd and 4th Place Match. He then became head coach of the Ghana national under-17 football team, the Black Starlets, who won the 1995 FIFA U-17 World Championship Trophy in Ecuador and the African Under-17 Championship in Mali.

On the local scene, he coached teams like Ashgold, Asante Kotoko, Okwawu United and Feynoord. He was the Technical Director of Ghana Premier League side West Africa Football Academy at the time of his death. He also brought Tony Yeboah into the limelight from Kumasi Cornerstone
