= Enock Asubonteng =

Ghanaian footballer

Personal information
- Date of birth: 27 October 2000 (age 26)
- Place of birth: Ghana
- Position: Midfielder

Team information
- Current team: WAFA
- Number: 26

Senior career*
Years	Team	Apps	(Gls)
2018–	WAFA	26	(4)
- * Club domestic league appearances and goals as of 5 July 2021

Enock Asubonteng (born 27 October 2000) is a Ghanaian footballer who currently plays as a midfielder for Ghana Premier League side WAFA.

== Career ==
Asubonteng started his career with West African Football Academy in August 2018. He made his debut during the 2019 GFA Normalization Special Competition. He played his first match on 10 April 2019 after coming on in the 76th minute for Michael Danso Agyemang in a 2–1 home victory over Karela United. He was named on the bench for a couple of matches during the truncated 2019–20 season but he however did not make any appearances. With the league set to restart, he was named on the club's squad list for the 2020–21 season. At the start of the season, he assumed a major role within the side, starting in matches week in and week out.
