= Justus Torsutsey =

Ghanaian association football player

Personal information
- Full name: Justus Torsutsey
- Date of birth: 3 September 1992 (age 34)
- Place of birth: Accra, Ghana
- Height: 1.75 m (5 ft 9 in)
- Position: Forward

Senior career*
Years	Team	Apps	(Gls)
2011–2016	Tudu Mighty Jets	53	(14)
2016–2018	Sekondi Hasaacas	43	(11)
2018–2019	Ebusua Dwarfs	6	(0)
- * Club domestic league appearances and goals

Justus Torsutsey (born 3 September 1992 in Accra) is a Ghanaian footballer.

== Club career ==
Torsutsey played his youth career with Abreshia United, before transferring to Ghana Premier League club Tudu Mighty Jets, where he began his senior and professional career. Signed with Ghanaian top-flight side Sekondi Hasaacas in January 2016.

In 2018, Torsutsey signed Ebusua Dwarfs. He made 6 league appearances his spell at the club.

Torsutsey debuted for Ebusua Dwarfs in the 2018 Ghanaian Premier League season on 24 March 2018 in a 0–0 draw against Wa All Stars at the Wa Sports Stadium.
