= Sogakope =

Sogakofe Sogakɔƒe
- District Capital
- Location in Ghana
- Coordinates: 5°59′51.65″N 0°35′17.82″E
- Country: Ghana
- Region: Volta
- District: South Tongu

Population (2007)
  - Total: 5,000
- Time zone: GMT
  - Summer (DST): GMT

Sogakofe (also known as Sogakope) is the capital of South Tongu District, a district in the Volta Region of Ghana. It is home to the lower Volta Bridge which connects Sogakofe to Sokpoe. The town is mostly known for its river tourism and mass bread production. The lower Volta Bridge is also the site of the Tortsogbeza, an annual festival held during Easter, which involves diving off the bridge, and is held in conjunction with the neighbouring town, Sokpoe. It is home to the Holy Trinity Spa, Cisneros Villa Hotel, and other notable resorts including Shekinah Glory Hotel, Sogakofe Beach Resort. The town is mostly known for bread baking.

Sogakofe is home to the District Hospital, Sogakofe Senior High School and Comboni Technical School. In 2014, the West African Football Academy moved to Sogakofe as its new home grounds for the Ghana Premier League. Since then, it has hosted league games with top clubs such as Accra Hearts of Oak S.C. and Asante Kotoko S.C.

== Geography ==
=== Location ===
Sogakofe is located at latitude 5.999 and longitude 0.594. The international highway from Togo through Ghana to Ivory Coast (Côte d'Ivoire) passes through Sogakofe. Very important on this route is the Lower Volta Bridge across the lower Volta River. Also, closer to the Lower Volta Bridge are the Holy Trinity Spa and Health Farm and the South Tongu District Assembly Office Complex. It is about 169.1 km(2 hours and 54 minutes drive via the Ho-Adidome road) from the famous Mount Afadja.
