= Augustine Boakye =

Ghanaian footballer (born 2000)

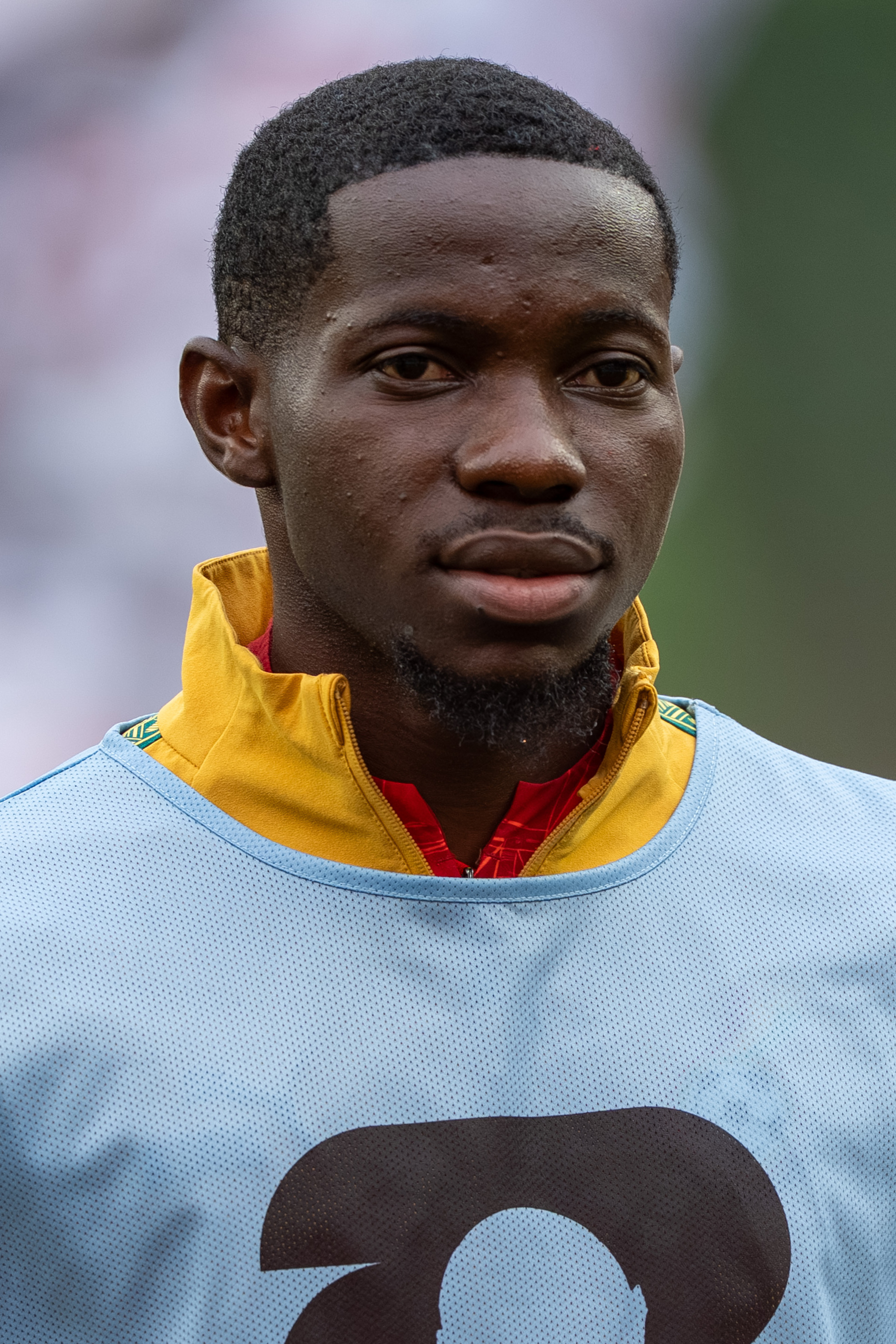
- Boakye with Ghana in 2026

Personal information
- Date of birth: 3 November 2000 (age 26)
- Place of birth: Bompata, Ghana
- Height: 1.78 m (5 ft 10 in)
- Position: Midfielder

Team information
- Current team: Saint-Étienne
- Number: 20

Youth career
- JMG Academy

Senior career*
Years	Team	Apps	(Gls)
2018–2021	WAFA	51	(10)
2021–2024	Wolfsberger AC	41	(12)
2021–2022	Wolfsberger AC II	16	(5)
2024–	Saint-Étienne	48	(8)

International career^{‡}
2026–	Ghana	2	(0)
- * Club domestic league appearances and goals as of 11 May 2026 ‡ National team caps and goals as of 29 September 2026

Augustine Boakye (born 3 November 2000) is a Ghanaian professional footballer who plays as a midfielder for Ligue 2 club Saint-Étienne and the Ghana national team.

== Club career ==
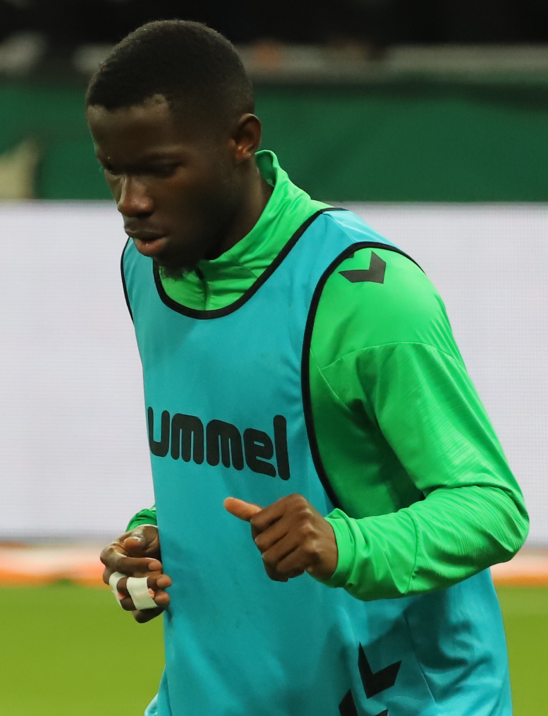
Boakye training with Saint-Étienne in 2024

Boakye began his football career with WAFA in the Ghana Premier League.

In August 2021, Boakye signed a four-year contract with Austrian Football Bundesliga club Wolfsberger AC.

In July 2024, Boakye joined Ligue 1 side Saint-Étienne, signing a four-year deal with an option of an additional year.

== International career ==
On 2 June 2026, Boakye was integrated by Ghana's coach Carlos Queiroz into his list of 26 players in order to compete in the 2026 FIFA World Cup.

On 24 September 2026, Boakye made his senior international debut in an AFCON qualifier against the Ivory Coast.

== Career statistics ==
=== Club ===
As of 12 April 2020.

Club	Season	League			Cup		Continental		Other		Total	
Club	Season	Division	Apps	Goals	Apps	Goals	Apps	Goals	Apps	Goals	Apps	Goals
WAFA	2018	Ghana Premier League	12	1	0	0	–		0	0	12	1
WAFA	2019–20	Ghana Premier League	10	0	0	0	–		0	0	10	0
Career total			22	1	0	0	0	0	0	0	22	1
