= Nii Gyashie Bortey Acquaye =

Ghanaian footballer (born 1999)

Personal information
- Date of birth: 12 February 1999 (age 27)
- Place of birth: Ghana
- Height: 1.92 m (6 ft 4 in)
- Position: Defender

Senior career*
Years	Team	Apps	(Gls)
2018–2020	WAFA	30	(1)
2021–2023	Legon Cities	55	(0)
2024	Nsoatreman	14	(0)
2024–2025	Regar-TadAZ Tursunzoda	10	(2)
2025	Khosilot Farkhor	13	(0)
2025	Hetten		
- * Club domestic league appearances and goals as of 5 July 2021

Nii Gyashie Bortey Acquaye (born 12 February 1999) is a Ghanaian footballer who currently plays as a defender.

== Career ==
Acquaye started his senior career with West African Football Academy in October 2018. During the 2019 GFA Normalization Competition, on 31 March 2019, he made his debut by playing the full 90 minutes in a 3–1 win against Liberty Professionals. On 5 May 2019, he scored his debut goal by scoring in the 72nd minute to help WAFA to a 3–2 home victory over Accra Hearts of Oak. At the end of the competition, he had featured in 11 matches and scored 1 goal. During the 2019–20 season, he played just a match but appeared on the bench for 14 other matches before the league was brought to an abrupt end due to the outbreak of COVID-19 in Ghana.

On 2 September 2025, Acquaye joined Saudi SDL club Hetten.
