= Prosper Narteh Ogum =

Ghanaian association football manager

Personal information
- Full name: Prosper Narteh Ogum
- Date of birth: 5 November 1977 (age 48)

Team information
- Current team: Asante Kotoko (manager)

Managerial career
- Years: Team
- 2013: Elmina Sharks
- 2019–2021: West African Football Academy
- 2021–2022: Asante Kotoko
- 2023–2025: Asante Kotoko

Prosper Narteh Ogum (born 5 November 1977) is a Ghanaian football manager who currently serves as head coach of Ghana national under-17 football team. He previously coached Ghanaian team Asante Kotoko and Ebusua Dwarfs. He is a Sports Psychologist and an Educationist.

== Education ==
Ogum is a trained teacher. He is a lecturer at the University of Cape Coast Department of Health, Physical Education & Recreation (HPER). Ogum holds a CAF License A badge.

== Coaching career ==
In 2013, Ogum masterminded the qualification of Elmina Sharks to the Ghana Division One League. He also worked with Ebusua Dwarfs in the Premier League during a short stint in 2016, he later resigned to pursue his Doctor of Philosophy programme (Ph.D). In October 2019, he was appointed as head coach of Karela United, the deal however terminated after disagreements with the management board. In 2025, Ogum was appointed the head coach of the Ghana U17 national team, also known as the Black Starlets. He was also appointed as Ghana Football Association's Head of Coach Education.

=== WAFA ===
In December 2019, he was appointed as head coach of West African Football Academy ahead of the 2019–20 Ghana Premier League season. In his first season, he led WAFA to the 10th position on the league standings before the season was truncated as a result of the COVID-19 pandemic. During his second season, the 2020–21 season, he guided WAFA to a 3rd-place finish accumulating 56 points.

== Honours ==
Asante Kotoko

- Ghana Premier League: 2021–22

Individual

- Ghana Premier League Coach of the Month: November 2021, January 2022, December 2023
- Ghana Premier League Coach of the Season: 2021–22
- Ghana Football Awards Men's Coach of the Year: 2022
