= 2011–12 Ghana Premier League =

2011–12 Glo Premier League
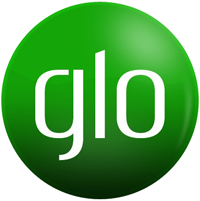
- Season: 2011–12
- Champions: Asante Kotoko
- Champions League: Asante Kotoko
- Confederation Cup: New Edubiase United (Ghanaian FA Cup winner)
- Goals: 482
- Top goalscorer: (Ghana) Emmanuel Baffour (21 goals)
- Biggest home win: Liberty 5 – Bechem United 0
- Biggest away win: Wassaman United 1 – Berekum Chelsea 4
- Highest scoring: Kotoko 4 – Bechem United 3 (7goals)
- Longest winning run: 7 games Ashgold FC
- Longest unbeaten run: 16 games Kotoko
- Longest winless run: 13 Bechem United
- Longest losing run: 6 Mysterious Dwarfs
- Highest attendance: Asante Kotoko vs Hearts of Oak (15 April 2012) : 38,000

The 2011–12 Ghanaian Premier League (known as the Glo Premier League for sponsorship reasons) season was the 53rd season of top-tier football in Ghana. The competition began on 5 September 2011, and ended on 27 May 2012.

== Teams and venues ==
As of 2011–2012 Season, Glo Premier League Clubs by Regions

Location of teams in 2011–2012 Glo Premier League

Regions (Population)	City / Area (Population)	Clubs
Ashanti Region (4,415,554)	Kumasi (1,989,062)	Asante Kotoko
Ashanti Region (4,415,554)	Obuasi (175,043)	Ashanti Gold
Ashanti Region (4,415,554)	New Edubiase (5,142)	New Edubiase United
Brong-Ahafo Region (1,824,827)	Dormaa Ahenkro (5,098)	Aduana Stars
Brong-Ahafo Region (1,824,827)	Bechem (5,112)	Bechem United
Brong-Ahafo Region (1,824,827)	Berekum (60,473)	Berekum Arsenal
Brong-Ahafo Region (1,824,827)	Berekum (60,473)	Berekum Chelsea
Central Region (1,805,488)	Cape Coast (217,032)	Ebusua Dwarfs
Greater Accra Region (3,909,764)	Accra (2,291,352)	Hearts of Oak
Greater Accra Region (3,909,764)	Accra (2,291,352)	Liberty Professionals
Greater Accra Region (3,909,764)	Accra (2,291,352)	Tudu Mighty Jets
Greater Accra Region (3,909,764)	Tema (160,939)	Tema Youth
Western Region (2,186,539)	Tarkwa (34,743)	Medeama SC
Western Region (2,186,539)	Tarkwa (34,743)	Wassaman United
Upper West Region (576,583)	Wa (102,446)	All Stars
Volta Region (1,635,421)	Kpandu (28,334)	Heart of Lions

^{*} Population – 2012 census

=== Team movement ===
Teams promoted to 2011–12 Glo Premier League

- Tema Youth (Tema, Greater Accra Region)
- Bechem United (Bechem, Brong-Ahafo Region)
- Wassaman United (Tarkwa, Western Region)

Teams relegated to 2012–13 Ghanaian Football Leagues

- Bechem United (Bechem, Brong-Ahafo Region)
- Tudu Mighty Jets (Accra, Greater Accra Region)
- Wassaman United (Tarkwa, Western Region)

Teams relegated following 2010–2011 Glo Premier League season

- King Faisal Babes (Kumasi, Ashanti Region)
- Real Tamale United (Tamale, Northern Region)
- BA Stars (Sunyani, Brong-Ahafo Region)

The following 16 clubs competed in the 2011–2012 Glo Premier League season.

- Glo Premier League's principle of official statistics is that final club succeeds to predecessor club's history & records.
- Glo Premier League Official Club Profiles Page

Managerial changes
Team	Outgoing manager	Manner of departure	Date of vacancy	Replaced by	Date of appointment	Position in table
Glo Premier League changes
Hearts of Oak	(Serbia) Nebojša Vučićević	Sacked	1 March 2012	(Ghana) Charles K. Akunnor	19 March 2012	2nd

Club	City / Area	Manager	Founded	Owner(s) / Sponsor(s)
Aduana Stars	Dormaa Ahenkro	(Romania) Aristică Cioabă	1985	Owners : Tigo in Millicom
All Stars	Wa	(Ghana) Emmanuel Quarshie	2006	Owners : MTN Ghana in MTN Group
Asante Kotoko	Kumasi	(Ghana) Maxwell Konadu	1935	Owner : King Otumfuo Nana Osei Tutu II of Ashanti, Royal Stockholder; Sponsors : Tigo in Millicom
Ashanti Gold	Obuasi	(Ghana) Yaw Acheampong	1978	Owners : Ashanti Goldfields Corporation in AngloGold Ashanti
Bechem United	Bechem	(Ghana) Kassim Mingle	1966	Owner : Victory Line Limited
Berekum Arsenal	Berekum	(Ghana) Ebo Mends	1978	Owners : MTN Ghana in MTN Group
Berekum Chelsea	Berekum	(Netherlands) Hans van der Pluijm	2000	Owner : Ghana Commercial Bank
Ebusua Dwarfs	Cape Coast	(Ghana) Nana Butler	1939	Owner : Fidelity Bank Ghana
Heart of Lions	Kpandu	(Ghana) Paa Kwesi Fabin	2002	Owners : Tigo in Millicom; Sponsor : Lotto Sport Italia
Hearts of Oak	Accra	(Ghana) Charles K. Akunnor	1911	Owner : Fidelity Bank Ghana
Liberty Professionals	Accra	(Ghana) Abedi Pele	1996	Owners : Kumesh Ghana Limited in Panasonic Corporation
Medeama SC	Tarkwa	(Ghana) Bashir Hayford	2002	Owner : Gold Fields
New Edubiase United	New Edubiase	(Ghana) Emmanuel Afranie	1998	Owner : Sidalco Limited
Tema Youth	Tema	(Ghana) Anthony Lokko	2005	Owner : Unilever Ghana; Sponsor : Adidas
Tudu Mighty Jets	Accra	(Ghana) Abubakar Nallah	1994	Owners : Globacom Ghana in Globacom; Sponsor : Lotto Sport Italia
Wassaman United	Tarkwa	(Ghana) Herbert Addo	2008	Owner : Trust Bank Limited (Ghana)

=== Stadiums ===
Primary venues used in the Glo Premier League:

Aduana Stars	All Stars	Asante Kotoko	Ashanti Gold
Agyeman Badu Stadium	Wa Sports Stadium	Baba Yara Stadium	Len Clay Stadium
Capacity: 5,000	Capacity: 5,000	Capacity: 40,500	Capacity: 30,000
Bechem United	Berekum Arsenal	Berekum Chelsea	Ebusua Dwarfs
Nana Gyeabour's Park	Berekum Sports Stadium	Coronation Park	Robert Mensah Sports Stadium
Capacity: 3,500	Capacity: 5,000	Capacity: 10,000	Capacity: 15,000
Heart of Lions	Hearts of Oak	Liberty Professionals	Medeama SC
Kpando Stadium	Ohene Djan Stadium	Dansoman Park	Abrankese Stadium
Capacity: 5,000	Capacity: 40,000	Capacity: 2,000	Capacity: 12,000
New Edubiase United	Tema Youth	Tudu Mighty Jets	Wassaman United
Len Clay Stadium	Tema Sports Stadium	Essipong Stadium	Tema Sports Stadium
Capacity: 30,000	Capacity: 10,000	Capacity: 20,000	Capacity: 10,000

== Standings ==
Pos	Team	Pld	W	D	L	GF	GA	GD	Pts	Qualification or relegation
1	Asante Kotoko (C)	30	18	9	3	43	18	+25	63	Qualification for 2013 CAF Champions League
2	Ashanti Gold	30	13	10	7	35	33	+2	49	
3	Hearts of Oak	30	12	11	7	31	20	+11	47	
4	Medeama SC	30	14	4	12	42	34	+8	46	
5	New Edubiase United	30	14	4	12	36	36	0	46	Qualification for 2013 CAF Confederation Cup (Note: New Edubiase United qualified for the 2013 CAF Confederation Cup as the 2011–12 Ghanaian FA Cup winner.)
6	Aduana Stars	30	11	12	7	26	17	+9	45	
7	Berekum Chelsea	30	11	12	7	30	23	+7	45	
8	Liberty Professionals	30	11	9	10	38	30	+8	42	
9	All Stars	30	11	9	10	20	20	0	42	
10	Ebusua Dwarfs	30	9	10	11	23	26	−3	37	
11	Tema Youth	30	9	8	13	32	33	−1	35	
12	Heart of Lions	30	7	13	10	22	30	−8	34	
13	Berekum Arsenal	30	7	9	14	24	39	−15	30	
14	Wassaman United (R)	30	7	8	15	27	43	−16	29	Relegation to Ghanaian Football Leagues
15	Bechem United (R)	30	6	11	13	25	42	−17	29	Relegation to Ghanaian Football Leagues
16	Tudu Mighty Jets (R)	30	5	13	12	23	32	−9	28	Relegation to Ghanaian Football Leagues

Updated to match(es) played on 27 May 2012. Source: Glo Premier League and FIFA.com
Rules for classification: 1) points; 2) goal difference; 3) number of goals scored.
(C) Champions; (R) Relegated

== Top scorers ==
Rank	Player	Nationality	Team	Goals	Ghana national team player
1	Emmanuel Baffour	Ghanaian	New Edubiase United	21	✔
2	Mohammed Yakubu	Ghanaian	Ashanti Gold	16	✖
3	Louis Agyemang	Ghanaian	Medeama SC	11	✖
3	Richard Addai	Ghanaian	Bechem United	11	✖
4	Mahatma Otoo	Ghanaian	Hearts of Oak	10	Ghana U-23 team and Ghana U-20 team player
5	Ahmed Toure	Ivorian	Asante Kotoko	8	
6	Latif Salifu	Ghanaian	Liberty Professionals	7	✖
6	Seidu Bancey	Ghanaian	Ebusua Dwarfs	7	✖
6	James Abban	Ghanaian	Hearts of Oak	7	✖
6	Abdul Basit	Ghanaian	Berekum Chelsea	7	✖
6	Emmanuel Clottey	Ghanaian	Berekum Chelsea	7	✔
6	Abubakar Sidi	Ghanaian	Tudu Mighty Jets	7	✖
7	Godfred Saka	Ghanaian	Aduana Stars	6	✖
8	Gilbert Fiamenyo	Ghanaian	Heart of Lions	5	✖
8	Nathaniel Asamoah	Ghanaian	Asante Kotoko	5	✔
Note: All other goalscorers in the 2011–12 Glo Premier League have scored one goal each. Last updated: Glo Premier League Match-Day (30), 27 May 2012.
