= 2012–13 Ghana Premier League =

54th Ghana Premier League season

- Season: 2012–13
- Champions: Asante Kotoko
- Champions League: Asante Kotoko
- Confederation Cup: Medeama; Ebusua Dwarfs
- Matches: 480
- Goals: 336 (0.7 per match)
- Top goalscorer: Mahatma Otoo (20) (Hearts of Oak)

The 2012–13 Ghana Premier League, known as the Glo Premier League for sponsorship purposes, season was the 54th season of the top-tier football league in Ghana that began on 6 October 2012.

== Teams and venues ==
Clubs	Location	stadium	capacity
Aduana Stars	Dormaa Ahenkro	Agyeman Badu Stadium	5,000
All Stars	Wa	Wa Sports Stadium	5,000
Amidaus Professionals	Tema	Tema Sports Stadium	10,000
Asante Kotoko	Kumasi	Baba Yara Stadium	40,500
Ashanti Gold	Obuasi	Len Clay Stadium	30,000
Berekum Arsenal	Berekum	Berekum Sports Stadium	5,000
Berekum Chelsea	Berekum	Coronation Park	10,000
Ebusua Dwarfs	Cape Coast	Robert Mensah Sports Stadium	15,000
Heart of Lions	Kpando	Kpando Stadium	5,000
Hearts of Oak	Accra	Ohene Djan Stadium	40,000
King Faisal Babes	Kumasi	Baba Yara Stadium	40,500
Liberty Professionals	Accra	Dansoman Park	2,000
Medeama SC	Tarkwa	TNA Park	12,000
New Edubiase United	New Edubiase	Len Clay Stadium	30,000
Real Tamale United	Tamale	Tamale Stadium	20,000
Tema Youth	Tema	Tema Sports Stadium	10,000

=== Team movement ===
Teams relegated following 2011–2012 Glo Premier League season

- Bechem United (Bechem, Brong-Ahafo Region)
- Tudu Mighty Jets (Accra, Greater Accra Region)
- Wassaman United (Tarkwa, Western Region)

Teams promoted following 2011–2012 Glo Premier League season

- King Faisal Babes (Kumbasi, Ashanti Region)
- Real Tamale United (Tamale, Northern Region)
- Amidaus Professionals (Tema Greater Accra Region)

Managerial changes
Team	Outgoing manager	Manner of departure	Date of vacancy	Replaced by	Date of appointment	Position in table
Glo Premier League changes
Asante Kotoko	Maxwell Konadu	Resigned	5 June 2012	Mas-ud Didi Dramani	26 June 2012	Champions
Liberty Profs.	Abedi Pele	Resigned	7 July 2012	Sellas Tetteh	10 July 2012	8th

== Standings ==
Pos	Team	Pld	W	D	L	GF	GA	GD	Pts	Relegation
1	Asante Kotoko	30	14	14	2	39	23	+16	56	
2	Berekum Chelsea	30	15	8	7	33	26	+7	53	
3	Ebusua Dwarfs	30	15	5	10	40	27	+13	50	
4	Medeama SC	30	14	8	8	32	25	+7	50	
5	Hearts of Oak	30	13	10	7	46	32	+14	49	
6	Ashanti Gold	30	13	8	9	36	29	+7	47	
7	Aduana Stars	30	12	9	9	28	25	+3	45	
8	King Faisal Babes	30	11	8	11	28	30	−2	41	
9	New Edubiase United	30	11	7	12	25	25	0	40	
10	WA All Stars	30	9	12	9	30	24	+6	39	
11	Amidaus Professionals	30	10	9	11	32	33	−1	39	
12	Liberty Professionals	30	10	8	12	32	33	−1	38	
13	Heart of Lions	30	9	9	12	31	33	−2	36	
14	Tema Youth (R)	30	7	10	13	33	35	−2	31	Relegation to the 2013–14 Ghana Division One
15	Berekum Arsenal (R)	30	6	11	13	25	41	−16	29	Relegation to the 2013–14 Ghana Division One
16	Real Tamale United (R)	30	0	6	24	20	69	−49	6	Relegation to the 2013–14 Ghana Division One

Updated to match(es) played on 23 June 2013. Source: Glo Premier League and FIFA.com
Rules for classification: 1) points; 2) goal difference; 3) number of goals scored.
Winner of the 2012–13 Ghana FA Cup will qualify for the 2014 CAF Confederation Cup
(R) Relegated

== Top scorers ==
Rank	Player	Nationality	Team	Goals	Ghana national team player
1	Mahatma Otoo	Ghanaian	Hearts of Oak	20	Ghana U-23 team and Ghana U-20 team player
2	Mohammed Yakubu	Ghanaian	Ashanti Gold	11	✖
3	Francis Narh	Ghanaian	Tema Youth	10	Ghana U-20 team player
3	Kennedy Ashia	Ghanaian	Liberty Professionals	10	Ghana U-20 team player
3	Yahaya Mohamed	Ghanaian	Amidaus Professionals	10	✔
4	Adjei Selasi	Ghanaian	Amidaus Professionals	8	✖
5	Ebenezer Assifuah	Ghanaian	Liberty Professionals	7	Ghana U-20 team player
5	Seidu Salifu	Ghanaian	Wa All Stars	7	Ghana U-20 team player
Note: All other goalscorers in the 2012–13 Glo Premier League have scored one goal each. Last updated: Glo Premier League Match-Day (21), 18 April 2013.
