= 2013–14 Ghana Premier League =

2013–14 First Capital Plus Bank Premier League
- Season: 2013–14
- Champions: Asante Kotoko
- Champions League: Asante Kotoko
- Confederation Cup: International Allies ^{[a]}
- Top goalscorer: (Ghana) Augustine Okrah; Berekum Chelsea (13)

The 2013–14 Ghanaian Premier League (known as the First Capital Plus Bank Premier League for sponsorship reasons) season is the 55th season of top-tier football in Ghana. The competition began on 15 September 2013, and ended on 4 June 2014, with Asante Kotoko crowned as champions.

== Teams and venues ==
Locations of the 2013–14 Ghana Premier League

Clubs	Location	stadium	capacity
Aduana Stars	Dormaa Ahenkro	Agyeman Badu Stadium	5,000
All Stars	Wa	Wa Sports Stadium	5,000
Amidaus Professionals	Tema	Tema Sports Stadium	10,000
Asante Kotoko	Kumasi	Baba Yara Stadium	40,500
Ashanti Gold	Obuasi	Len Clay Stadium	30,000
Bechem	Brong-Ahafo Region	Nana Gyeabour's Park	5,000
Berekum Chelsea	Berekum	Coronation Park	10,000
Ebusua Dwarfs	Cape Coast	Robert Mensah Sports Stadium	15,000
Heart of Lions	Kpandu	Kpando Stadium	5,000
Int. Allies	Greater Accra Region	Tema Sports Stadium	5,000
Hearts of Oak	Accra	Ohene Djan Stadium	40,000
King Faisal Babes	Kumasi	Baba Yara Stadium	40,500
Liberty Professionals	Accra	Dansoman Park	2,000
Medeama SC	Tarkwa	TNA Park	12,000
New Edubiase United	New Edubiase	Len Clay Stadium	30,000
Sekondi Hasaacas F.C.	Sekondi-Takoradi	Sekondi-Takoradi Stadium	20,000

=== Team Movements ===
Teams promoted following 2011–2012 Glo Premier League season

- Tema Youth, (Tema, Greater Accra)
- Bechem United, (Bechem, Brong-Ahafo)
- Wassaman United, (Tarkwa, Western)

Teams promoted following 2012–2013 Glo Premier League season

- Sekondi Hasaacas F.C., (Sekondi-Takoradi, Western)
- International Allies F.C., (Accra, Greater Accra)
- Bechem United, (Bechem, Brong-Ahafo)
- Winner of the 2012–13 Ghanaian FA Cup qualified for the 2014 CAF Confederation Cup.
- Runner-up of the 2013–14 Ghanaian FA Cup qualified for the 2015 CAF Confederation Cup.

== Standings ==
Pos	Team	Pld	W	D	L	GF	GA	GD	Pts	Qualification or relegation
1	Asante Kotoko (C)	30	17	4	9	36	25	+11	55	Qualification for 2015 CAF Champions League
2	Heart of Lions	30	14	5	11	35	33	+2	47	
3	Hearts of Oak	30	13	7	10	31	31	0	46	
4	Ashanti Gold	30	12	9	9	31	28	+3	45	
5	Bechem United	30	11	9	10	33	31	+2	42	
6	International Allies	30	12	5	13	31	32	−1	41	Qualification for 2015 CAF Confederation Cup (Note: International Allies as runner-up of the 2013–14 Ghanaian FA Cup qualified for the 2015 CAF Confederation Cup.)
7	Sekondi Hasaacas	30	11	8	11	41	37	+4	41	
8	All Stars	30	11	8	11	29	23	+6	41	
9	Medeama SC	30	10	10	10	27	28	−1	40	
10	New Edubiase United	30	11	7	12	27	26	+1	40	
11	Aduana Stars	30	11	7	12	31	28	+3	40	
12	Berekum Chelsea	30	10	10	10	25	28	−3	40	
13	Liberty Professionals	30	12	4	14	27	33	−6	40	
14	King Faisal Babes (R)	30	10	8	12	22	28	−6	38	Relegation to Ghanaian Football Leagues
15	Ebusua Dwarfs (R)	30	9	8	13	28	29	−1	35	Relegation to Ghanaian Football Leagues
16	Amidaus Professionals (R)	30	10	3	17	28	42	−14	33	Relegation to Ghanaian Football Leagues

Updated to match(es) played on 4 June 2014. Source: First Capital Plus Bank Premier League and FIFA.com
Rules for classification: 1) points; 2) goal difference; 3) number of goals scored.
(C) Champions; (R) Relegated

== Top scorers ==
Rank	Player	Nationality	Team	Goals	Ghana national team player
1	Augustine Okrah	Ghanaian	Berekum Chelsea	13	✖
2	Seidu Bancey	Ghanaian	Asante Kotoko	11	✔
3	Paul de Vries	Ghanaian	All Stars	9	✔
3	Samuel Afful	Ghanaian	Sekondi Hasaacas	9	✔
3	Emmanuel Osei	Ghanaian	Ashanti Gold	9	✖
4	Frederick Boateng	Ghanaian	Ebusua Dwarfs	8	✖
5	Richard Yamoah	Ghanaian	Sekondi Hasaacas	7	✖
Note: All other goalscorers in the 2013–14 First Capital Plus Bank Premier League have scored six to one goal each. Last updated: First Capital Plus Bank Premier League Match-Day (30), 4 June 2014.
