= List of football stadiums in Ghana =

The following is a list of football stadiums in Ghana, with a capacity of at least 5,000 spectators. Some stadiums are used for other purposes like athletics, concerts, cultural events, politics, and rugby union. The 11,000-capacity UG Sports Stadium in Accra is known as the main rugby union stadium in Ghana.

== Current stadiums ==
| # | Image | Stadium | Capacity | City | Home team(s) |
|---|---|---|---|---|---|
| 1 | | Baba Yara Stadium | 40,528 | Kumasi | Asante Kotoko, King Faisal Babes, National team |
| 2 | | Accra Sports Stadium | 40,000 | Accra | Great Olympics, Hearts of Oak, National team |
| 3 | | Len Clay Stadium | 20,000 | Obuasi | Ashanti Gold SC |
| 4 | | Sekondi-Takoradi Stadium | 20,000 | Sekondi-Takoradi | Sekondi Hasaacas FC |
| 5 | | Tamale Stadium | 20,000 | Tamale | Real Tamale United |
| 6 | | Cape Coast Sports Stadium | 15,000 | Cape Coast | Cape Coast Ebusua Dwarfs, National team |
| 7 | | Gyandu Park | 15,000 | Sekondi-Takoradi | Medeama SC, Sekondi Hasaacas FC, Hasaacas Ladies FC, Sekondi Eleven Wise |
| 8 | | Abrankese Stadium | 12,000 | Kumasi | Medeama SC |
| 9 | | UG Sports Stadium | 11,000 | Accra | |
| 10 | | TNA Park | 10,000 | Tarkwa | Medeama SC |
| 11 | | Azumah Nelson Sports Complex | 10,000 | Accra | Hearts of Oak, Great Olympics |
| 12 | | Agyeman Badu Stadium | 10,000 | Dormaa Ahenkro | Aduana Stars |
| 13 | | El Wak Stadium | 7,000 | Accra | International Allies F.C. |
| 14 | | Coronation Park | 5,000 | Sunyani | Bofoakwa Tano, Berekum Chelsea, Brong-Ahafo United |
| 15 | | Tema Sports Stadium | 5,000 | Tema | Tema Youth, Real Sportive |
| 16 | | Dawu Sports Stadium | 5,000 | Accra | Right to Dream Academy, Dreams FC |
| 17 | | Kpando Stadium | 5,000 | Kpandu | Heart of Lions |
| 18 | | Nkawkaw Park | 5,000 | Nkawkaw | Okwawu United |
| 19 | | Kaladan Park | 5,000 | Tamale | Real Tamale United |
| 20 | | Koforidua Sports Stadium | 5,000 | Koforidua | Power FC |
| 21 | | Asuom Park | 5,000 | Asuom | Kwaebibirem United |
| 22 | | Berekum Sports Stadium | 5,000 | Berekum | Berekum Arsenal, Berekum Chelsea F.C. |
| 23 | | Scot Stadium | 5,000 | Prestea | Mine Stars |
| 24 | | Swedru Sports Stadium | 5,000 | Agona Swedru | All Blacks F.C. |
| 25 | | Wa Sports Stadium | 5,000 | Wa | Wa All Stars FC |
| 26 | | Fosu Gyeabour Stadium | 5,000 | Bechem | Bechem United |

== See also ==
- List of African stadiums by capacity
- List of association football stadiums by country
- List of sports venues by capacity
- List of stadiums by capacity
- Lists of stadiums
- Football in Ghana
