= 2015 Ghana Premier League =

2015 First Capital Plus Bank Premier League
- Season: 2015
- Champions: Ashanti Gold
- Relegated: Brong Ahafo Stars; Great Olympics; Heart of Lions
- Champions League: Ashanti Gold
- Confederation Cup: Medeama
- Matches: 240
- Goals: 507 (2.11 per match)
- Top goalscorer: Kofi Owusu (19)
- Biggest home win: 4 matches: Asante Kotoko 4-0 Heart of Lions (29 April 2015); Hearts of Oak 4-0 Heart of Lions (22 July 2015); Heart of Lions 4-0 Brong Ahafo Stars (5 August 2015); Asante Kotoko 4-0 Aduana Stars (13 September 2015)
- Biggest away win: 2 matches: Brong Ahafo Stars 0-2 Asante Kotoko (25 January 2015); Bechem 1-3 Asante Kotoko (22 March 2015)
- Highest scoring: 6 matches: Berekum Chelsea 4-2 Hearts of Oak (21 January 2015); Berekum Chelsea 4-2 Bechem (11 February 2015); Great Olympics 4-2 Berekum Chelsea (5 August 2015); Asante Kotoko 4-2 Brong Ahafo Stars (16 August 2015); New Edubiase 4-2 Heart of Lions (13 September 2015); Bechem 4-2 Brong Ahafo Stars (13 September 2015)
- Longest winning run: Ashanti Gold; Inter Allies (4)
- Longest unbeaten run: Asante Kotoko; Inter Allies (8)
- Longest winless run: Brong Ahafo Stars (16)
- Longest losing run: Brong Ahafo Stars (4)

The 2015 Ghanaian Premier League (known as the First Capital Plus Bank Premier League for sponsorship reasons) season will be the 56th season of top-tier football in Ghana. The competition was scheduled to begin in late September 2014 or early October 2014, although it did not start until January 2015.

Ashanti Gold broke up Asante Kotoko's run of dominance with their first league title (They had previously won three under the name Goldfields). Asante Kotoko entered the league having won the last three titles and 24 total dating back to 1959. There was little drama concerning the championship as Ashanti Gold held first place for 29 of the 30 rounds this season, only briefly falling to second in Round 4, and clinching the title with a week to go.

There was considerable drama in the race to avoid relegation as eight teams were still in danger of falling into the bottom three on the final day of the season (Brong Ahafo Stars had sealed their fate several weeks earlier). Great Olympics got the win they needed, 2-1 over Ashanti Gold, but didn't get the help they needed to climb out of the bottom three as five other teams ahead of them won or drew. Heart of Lions was the other club to be relegated, falling from ninth to 14th with the season-ending 4-2 loss at New Edubiase. Brong Ahafo Stars, Great Olympics and Heart of Lions will all play in Division One for the 2015-16 season.

== Teams and venues ==
Locations of the 2015 Ghana Premier League

Clubs	Location	stadium	capacity
Aduana Stars	Dormaa Ahenkro	Agyeman Badu Stadium	5,000
All Stars	Wa	Wa Sports Stadium	5,000
Asante Kotoko	Kumasi	Baba Yara Stadium	40,500
Ashanti Gold	Obuasi	Len Clay Stadium	30,000
Bechem	Brong-Ahafo Region	Nana Gyeabour's Park	5,000
Berekum Chelsea	Berekum	Coronation Park	10,000
Heart of Lions	Kpandu	Kpando Stadium	5,000
Int. Allies	Greater Accra Region	Tema Sports Stadium	5,000
Hearts of Oak	Accra	Ohene Djan Stadium	40,000
Liberty Professionals	Accra	Dansoman Park	2,000
Medeama SC	Tarkwa	TNA Park	12,000
New Edubiase United	New Edubiase	Len Clay Stadium	30,000
Sekondi Hasaacas F.C.	Sekondi-Takoradi	Sekondi-Takoradi Stadium	20,000

=== Team movement ===
Teams promoted following 2013–2014 Glo Premier League season

- Brong Ahafo Stars, (Sunyani, Brong-Ahafo)
- Accra Great Olympics F.C., (Accra, Greater Accra)
- West African Football Academy, (Gomoa Fetteh, Central)
- Runner-up of the 2015 Ghanaian FA Cup qualifies for the 2016 CAF Confederation Cup.
- Winner of runner-up of the 2014–15 Ghanaian FA Cup qualifies for the 2016 CAF Confederation Cup.

== Standings ==
Pos	Team	Pld	W	D	L	GF	GA	GD	Pts	Qualification or relegation
1	Ashanti Gold (C, Q)	30	15	7	8	35	26	+9	52	Qualification for 2016 CAF Champions League
2	Asante Kotoko	30	13	9	8	41	30	+11	48	
3	Aduana Stars	30	14	4	12	23	25	−2	46	
4	Berekum Chelsea	30	13	5	12	43	35	+8	44	
5	Liberty Professionals	30	12	7	11	28	28	0	43	
6	Inter Allies	30	11	9	10	28	22	+6	42 (Note: INT: 7 points; HAS: 6 points; NEW: 4 points)	
7	Hasaacas	30	12	6	12	33	35	−2	42	
8	New Edubiase	30	11	9	10	38	41	−3	42	
9	Wa All Stars	30	12	5	13	26	24	+2	41 (Note: WAS: 11 points; BEC: 8 points; MED: 7 points; WAF: 6 points)	
10	Bechem	30	12	5	13	33	34	−1	41	
11	Medeama (Q)	30	10	11	9	35	29	+6	41	2016 CAF Confederation Cup (Note: Winner or runner-up of the 2014–15 Ghanaian FA Cup qualifies for the 2016 CAF Confederation Cup.)
12	WAFA	30	11	8	11	27	27	0	41	
13	Hearts of Oak	30	10	10	10	33	31	+2	40 (Note: HOO: 7 points; HOL: 6 points; GRE: 4 points)	
14	Heart of Lions (R)	30	11	7	12	35	38	−3	40	Relegation to Division One League
15	Great Olympics (R)	30	11	7	12	33	34	−1	40	Relegation to Division One League
16	Brong Ahafo Stars (R)	30	4	7	19	21	53	−32	19	Relegation to Division One League

Updated to match(es) played on 13 September 2015. Source: First Capital Plus Bank Premier League and FIFA.com
Rules for classification: 1) points; 2) head-to-head points; 3) head-to-head goal difference; 4) head-to-head goals scored; 5) head-to-head away goals; 6) playoff
(C) Champions; (Q) Qualified for the phase indicated; (R) Relegated

== Positions by round ==
Team ╲ Round	1	2	3	4	5	6	7	8	9	10	11	12	13	14	15	16	17	18	19	20	21	22	23	24	25	26	27	28	29	30
Ashanti Gold	1	1	1	2	1	1	1	1	1	1	1	1	1	1	1	1	1	1	1	1	1	1	1	1	1	1	1	1	1	1
Asante Kotoko	9	13	7	5	6	8	12	12	13	14	12	7	9	9	5	9	11	9	11	9	9	10	11	11	10	9	7	3	3	2
Aduana Stars	1	2	2	1	3	2	2	2	2	2	2	2	2	2	3	2	4	2	5	2	4	3	5	3	2	2	2	2	2	3
Berekum Chelsea	9	5	12	7	4	4	3	5	6	10	7	11	5	8	7	7	5	6	5	4	2	2	2	2	3	3	4	4	7	4
Liberty Professionals	9	6	5	4	5	6	10	8	9	6	9	14	10	9	6	6	2	5	4	6	7	8	9	8	8	10	9	7	4	5
Inter Allies	1	11	5	11	8	7	4	7	4	3	5	3	4	5	9	11	14	12	12	10	7	5	4	5	4	4	3	5	5	6
Hasaacas	1	2	2	3	2	3	7	4	7	8	11	8	12	12	14	10	10	7	10	7	6	7	8	7	7	8	6	8	11	7
New Edubiase	9	13	16	11	14	14	9	10	13	9	13	10	13	13	15	13	12	13	14	11	12	11	10	10	11	13	11	9	10	8
Wa All Stars	1	2	2	6	7	9	12	14	11	7	4	6	11	6	8	4	8	3	2	3	5	6	5	6	5	5	8	11	6	9
Bechem	9	8	14	7	10	13	15	10	8	12	13	15	14	15	12	14	13	14	8	12	10	12	13	12	12	11	13	12	14	10
Medeama	9	13	15	10	12	10	6	9	10	11	6	9	5	7	4	4	6	8	7	8	11	9	7	9	9	7	10	10	13	11
WAFA	9	16	9	14	10	12	8	6	4	5	3	5	3	3	2	3	3	4	3	5	3	4	3	4	6	6	5	6	8	12
Hearts of Oak	1	12	7	11	13	5	10	14	11	13	10	13	8	11	11	12	7	11	9	13	13	14	12	14	14	14	12	15	12	13
Heart of Lions	1	10	13	7	8	11	5	3	3	4	8	4	5	4	10	8	9	10	12	14	14	13	14	13	13	12	15	14	9	14
Great Olympics	9	7	11	16	16	15	16	12	15	15	15	12	15	13	13	15	15	15	15	15	15	15	15	15	15	15	14	13	15	15
Brong Ahafo Stars	1	9	10	15	15	16	14	16	16	16	16	16	16	16	16	16	16	16	16	16	16	16	16	16	16	16	16	16	16	16

Updated to match(es) played on 13 September 2015. Source: Soccerway (in French)
= Leader; = Relegation to Ghana Football Leagues

== Top scorers ==
Rank	Goalscorer	Team	Goals
1	(Ghana) Kofi Owusu	Berekum Chelsea	19
2	(Ghana) Nathaniel Asamoah	Medeama	18
3	(Ghana) Fuseini Nuhu	New Edubiase	13
4	(Ghana) Stephen Baffour	Berekum Chelsea	12
5	(Ghana) Kennedy Ashia	Liberty Professionals	11
5	(Ivory Coast) Ahmed Touré	Asante Kotoko	11
5	(Ghana) Mohammed Yakubu	Ashanti Gold	11
8	(Ghana) Noah Martey	Bechem	10
9	(Ghana) Sheriff Deo Mohammed	Inter Allies	9
10	(Ghana) Martin Antwi	WAFA	8
10	(Ghana) Richard Arhin	Aduana Stars	8
10	(Ghana) Gilbert Fiamenyo	Hearts of Oak	8
10	(Ghana) Bernard Ofori	New Edubiase	8
10	(Ghana) Mumuni Zakaria	WAFA	8

Updated to games played on 13 September 2015
Source: soccerway.com
