= 2016 Ghana Premier League =

First Capital Plus Premier League
- Season: 2016
- Champions: Wa All Stars
- Relegated: Hasaacas; New Edubiase; Techiman City; Dreams FC
- Champions League: Wa All Stars
- Matches: 240
- Goals: 481 (2 per match)
- Top goalscorer: Latif Blessing (17)
- Biggest home win: WAFA 5-0 Hasaacas (6 March 2016)
- Biggest away win: 6 matches: Medeama 0-2 Hearts of Oak (28 February 2016); Hearts of Oak 1-3 Wa All Stars (3 April 2016); Liberty Professionals 0-2 Asante Kotoko (13 August 2016); Ebusua Dwarfs 0-2 Bechem United (20 August 2016); New Edubiase 1-3 Hearts of Oak (18 September 2016); Dreams 0-2 Ebusua Dwarfs (18 September 2016)
- Highest scoring: Ashanti Gold 5-3 Asante Kotoko (14 September 2016)
- Longest winning run: Aduana Stars; Bechem United (5)
- Longest unbeaten run: Ashanti Gold (9)
- Longest winless run: Ashanti Gold; Liberty Professionals; New Edubiase (8)
- Longest losing run: New Edubiase (6)
- All statistics correct as of 18 September 2016.

The 2016 Ghanaian Premier League was the 60th season of top professional association football in Ghana. The domestic league season began on 21 January and concluded on 18 September with Wa All Stars winning their first league title. Only the games between Asante Kotoko and the Hearts of Oak attracted a high attendance.

== Teams ==
The Ghanaian Premier League comprises 16 sides, of which the bottom three - Hasaacas, New Edubiase and Techiman City - will be relegated to the Division One. In December 2016, Dreams FC was demoted from the Ghana Premier League due to an anomaly with the registration of a player. The decision was taken by the Ghana Football Association's Disciplinary Committee.

== Stadia and locations ==
Location of the 2016 Ghanaian Premier League teams

Team	Stadium	Location	Capacity
Aduana Stars	Agyeman Badu Stadium	Dormaa Ahenkro	5,000
All Stars	Wa Sports Stadium	Wa	5,000
Asante Kotoko	Baba Yara Stadium	Kumasi	40,528
AshantiGold	Len Clay Stadium	Obuasi	20,000
Bechem United	Nana Gyeabour's Park	Bechem	5,000
Berekum Chelsea	Berekum Sports Stadium	Berekum	10,000
Dreams	Dawu Sports Stadium	Accra	10,000
Ebusua Dwarfs	Cape Coast Sports Stadium	Cape Coast	15,000
Hearts of Oak	Accra Sports Stadium	Accra	40,000
Inter Allies	Tema Sports Stadium	Tema	10,000
Liberty Professionals	Dansoman Park	Dansoman	2,000
Medeama	TNA Park	Tarkwa	12,000
New Edubiase United	Len Clay Stadium	Obuasi	20,000
Sekondi Hasaacas	Sekondi-Takoradi Stadium	Sekondi-Takoradi	20,000
Techiman City	Ohene Ameyaw Park	Techiman	2,000
WAFA	Sogakope Stadium	Goma Fetteh	1,000

== League table ==
Pos	Team	Pld	W	D	L	GF	GA	GD	Pts	Qualification or relegation
1	Wa All Stars (C, Q)	30	15	6	9	31	22	+9	51	Qualification for 2017 CAF Champions League
2	Aduana Stars	30	14	7	9	42	24	+18	49	
3	Hearts of Oak	30	12	12	6	31	26	+5	48	
4	Medeama	30	13	7	10	34	31	+3	46 (Note: ASA 2-2 MED; MED 1-1 ASA)	
5	Asante Kotoko	30	12	10	8	33	29	+4	46	
6	Bechem United	30	12	6	12	31	34	−3	42 (Note: BEC 2-0 WAF; WAF 2-0 BEC)	
6	WAFA	30	11	9	10	31	22	+9	42	
8	Berekum Chelsea	30	12	4	14	26	27	−1	40 (Note: BER: 11 points; DRE: 10 points; EBU: 6 points; ASH: 4 points)	
9	Dreams	30	11	7	12	30	34	−4	40	Relegation to Division One League
10	Ebusua Dwarfs	30	11	7	12	31	31	0	40	
11	Ashanti Gold	30	8	16	6	32	31	+1	40	
12	Inter Allies	30	9	11	10	34	31	+3	38 (Note: LIB 2-1 INT; INT 1-0 LIB)	
13	Liberty Professionals	30	10	8	12	33	30	+3	38	
14	Hasaacas (R)	30	10	6	14	32	43	−11	36	Relegation to Division One League
15	Techiman City (R)	30	9	7	14	28	41	−13	34	Relegation to Division One League
16	New Edubiase (R)	30	6	7	17	20	43	−23	25	Relegation to Division One League

Updated to match(es) played on 18 September 2016. Source: Standings
Rules for classification: 1) points; 2) head-to-head points; 3) head-to-head goal difference; 4) head-to-head goals scored; 5) head-to-head away goals; 6) playoff
(C) Champions; (Q) Qualified for the phase indicated; (R) Relegated

== Positions by round ==
Team ╲ Round	1	2	3	4	5	6	7	8	9	10	11	12	13	14	15	16	17	18	19	20	21	22	23	24	25	26	27	28	29	30
Wa All Stars	1	1	1	2	2	1	1	1	1	1	2	3	4	1	1	1	1	1	2	2	2	3	1	1	1	1	1	1	1	1
Aduana Stars	9	13	16	13	12	10	13	9	8	5	3	2	2	3	2	4	4	4	4	6	3	2	3	3	3	2	2	2	2	2
Hearts of Oak	1	1	1	1	1	2	2	2	2	2	1	1	1	2	4	2	3	3	1	1	1	1	2	2	2	3	4	3	3	3
Medeama	9	13	13	15	12	9	12	15	16	10	12	13	12	11	6	5	5	5	5	3	4	5	6	6	7	8	8	5	4	4
Asante Kotoko	9	13	14	14	10	16	9	8	9	9	5	4	3	4	3	3	2	2	2	4	5	6	4	4	4	4	3	4	5	5
Bechem United	1	5	4	6	7	12	14	12	12	11	10	10	13	12	14	13	14	12	12	13	14	12	15	13	11	7	7	6	6	6
WAFA	1	12	4	6	4	7	6	6	7	8	9	9	8	8	9	8	8	8	7	7	7	7	7	7	5	6	5	7	6	6
Berekum Chelsea	9	6	8	4	3	6	4	5	4	6	8	8	6	7	8	10	9	10	9	9	8	9	10	12	9	10	10	9	10	8
Dreams	1	1	1	3	6	3	2	3	6	3	6	6	7	6	7	7	6	7	6	5	6	4	5	5	6	5	5	7	8	9
Ebusua Dwarfs	9	13	15	15	16	14	16	13	14	15	16	16	16	15	15	14	15	14	14	11	13	10	9	8	8	9	11	12	11	10
Ashanti Gold	1	9	8	6	8	8	11	10	10	13	13	12	11	12	12	15	12	13	10	10	11	11	11	10	9	10	9	10	9	11
Inter Allies	1	11	10	10	10	15	9	14	15	16	15	15	15	14	13	11	13	15	15	14	15	14	14	15	15	15	14	13	12	12
Liberty Professionals	9	8	7	4	9	4	7	4	3	4	7	7	5	5	5	6	7	6	8	8	9	8	8	9	12	12	12	11	13	13
Hasaacas	9	4	11	11	12	11	8	11	11	14	11	11	10	10	11	12	10	11	13	15	12	15	13	14	14	14	15	14	15	14
Techiman City	1	7	4	6	4	5	5	7	5	7	4	5	9	9	10	9	11	9	11	12	10	13	12	11	13	13	13	15	14	15
New Edubiase	9	9	11	11	12	13	15	16	13	12	14	14	14	16	16	16	16	16	16	16	16	16	16	16	16	16	16	16	16	16

Updated to match(es) played on 18 September 2016. Source: Soccerway (in French)
= Leader; = Relegation to Ghana Football Leagues

== Top scorers ==
Rank	Goalscorer	Team	Goals
1	(Ghana) Latif Blessing	Liberty Professionals	17
2	(Ghana) Kwesi Donsu	Medeama	15
2	(Ghana) Yahaya Mohammed	Aduana Stars	15
3	(Ghana) Abednego Tetteh	Bechem United	13
4	(Ghana) Bright Adjei	Aduana Stars	12
5	(Ghana) Cosmos Dauda	Hearts of Oak	11
6	(Ghana) Shafiu Mumuni	Ashanti Gold	10
7	(Ghana) Frederick Boateng	Inter Allies	9
7	(Ghana) Sadick Adams	Berekum Chelsea	9
8	(Ghana) Bright Luqman	Ebusua Dwarfs	8

Updated to games played on 18 September 2016
Source: Global Sports Archive

=== Hat-tricks ===
Player	For	Against	Result	Date
Samuel Tetteh	WAFA	Hasaacas	5-0	6 March 2016
Yahaya Mohammed	Aduana Stars	Hasaacas	4-0	20 April 2016
Dauda Mohammed	Asante Kotoko	Techiman City	4-2	29 May 2016
Latif Blessing	Liberty Professionals	Hasaacas	4-0	27 July 2016
