= Eric Ofori Antwi =

Ghanaian footballer (born 1994)

Personal information
- Full name: Eric Ofori Antwi
- Date of birth: 30 October 1994 (age 31)
- Place of birth: Tamale, Ghana
- Height: 1.86 m (6 ft 1 in)
- Position: Goalkeeper

Team information
- Current team: Legon Cities
- Number: 16

Youth career
- –2011: Red Bull Ghana

Senior career*
Years	Team	Apps	(Gls)
2011–2014	Amidaus Professionals	17	(0)
2014–2017	Asante Kotoko	15	(0)
2017–2021	Medeama	30	(0)
2021–2022	Legon Cities	5	(0)
2022–	Hearts of Oak		

International career^{‡}
2013	Ghana U20	11	(0)
Medal record
Professionalism in association football
Ghana
Runner-up	African Youth Championship	2013
Third place	FIFA U-20 World Cup	2013
- * Club domestic league appearances and goals as of 6 December 2021 ‡ National team caps and goals as of 6 December 2021

Eric Ofori Antwi (born 30 October 1994) is a Ghanaian professional footballer who plays as a goalkeeper for Legon Cities in the Ghana Premier League. In 2013, coach Sellas Tetteh called him up as a number one goalkeeper and to be a member of the Ghana national under-20 football team for the 2013 African Youth Championship and for the 2013 FIFA U-20 World Cup.

== Club career ==
Antwi signed for Amidaus Professionals on 1 January 2012. In January 2015, he signed for Asante Kotoko from Amidaus Professionals.

On 3 August 2022, Ofori Antwi joined Ghanaian side Hearts of Oak. On 1 September 2023, he suffered an injury that would keep him out for the first 12 matches of the season.

== International career ==
In 2013, Ofori Antwi was appointed the number one goalkeeper of the Ghana U20 national team for the 2013 African Youth Championship and was crowned as the Most Valuable Player (MVP) and for the 2013 FIFA U-20 World Cup.

== Career statistics ==
=== Club ===
As of 1 December 2013

Team	Season	Domestic League		Domestic Cup		Continental Competition^{1}		Other Tournaments^{2}		Total	
Team	Season	Apps	Goals	Apps	Goals	Apps	Goals	Apps	Goals	Apps	Goals
Amidaus	2012–13	0	0	0	0	0	0	–		0	0
Amidaus	2013–14	1	0	0	0	0	0	–		1	0
Asante Kotoko	2014–15	0	0	0	0	0	0	–		0	0
Career Total		1	0	0	0	0	0	0	0	1	0

^{1}African competitions include the CAF Champions League and the CAF Confederations Cup.
^{2}Other tournaments include none to date.

== Honours ==
Ghana U20

- African Youth Championship runner-up: 2013
- FIFA U-20 World Cup third place: 2013

Individual

- African Youth Championship Most Valuable Player: 2013
