= Stephen Ahorlu =

Ghanaian footballer

Steve Ahorlu
Personal information
- Full name: Stephen Ahorlu
- Date of birth: 5 September 1988 (age 38)
- Place of birth: Kpandu, Ghana
- Height: 1.84 m (6 ft 0 in)
- Position: Goalkeeper

Youth career
- Heart of Lions

Senior career*
Years	Team	Apps	(Gls)
2008–2010	Heart of Lions		(0)
2010–2011	Hapoel Ashkelon	32	(0)
2011	Heart of Lions		(0)
2011–2012	Medeama S.C.		(0)
2012	→ Wassaman United (loan)		(0)
2012–2024	Heart of Lions	5	(0)
- * Club domestic league appearances and goals

Stephen Ahorlu (born 5 September 1988) is a Ghanaian former professional footballer who plays as a goalkeeper.

== Club career ==
Ahorlu was born in Kpandu.

He returned to his former club Heart of Lions ahead of the 2013–14 season. In December he received criticism from fans for poor performances.

Ahorlu retired in 2015 after sustaining a "career-threatening injury" in 2013.

== International career ==
On 13 May 2010, Ahorlu earned his call-up in the Ghana national team for the 2010 FIFA World Cup.

== Post-playing career ==
In 2017 Ahorlu was appointed goalkeeping coach at his former club Heart of Lions, playing in Ghana's Division One, the country's second tier.
