= Richard Addai =

Ghanaian footballer (born 1986)

Personal information
- Date of birth: 27 July 1986 (age 40)
- Place of birth: Ghana
- Position: Forward

Senior career*
Years	Team	Apps	(Gls)
2006–2011	Aduana Stars		
2011–2012	Bechem United		
2012–2013	Accra Hearts of Oak		
2013–2015	Aduana Stars		
- * Club domestic league appearances and goals as of 27 August 2021

Richard Addai (born 27 July 1986) is a Ghanaian footballer who last played as a forward for Ghana Premier League side Aduana Stars.

== Career ==
=== Aduana Stars ===
Addai played in Ghana during his football career. He played for Aduana Stars from 2006 to 2011. He was part of the team when they won the Ghana Division One League Zone I and got promoted to the Ghana Premier League (GPL) in 2008–09 season. He scored the winning goal.

On 19 August 2009, during the final game of the season, Aduana came from a goal down to beat Universal Stars 2–1 at the Baba Yara Sports Stadium in Kumasi, with Addai scoring the winning goal in the 78th minute to clinch a victory and qualify to Ghana Premier League for the first time in the club's history.

On 17 October 2009, Addai led the club to their first GPL win at home, edging past Hearts of Lions by scoring the lone goal in the 73rd minute at the Nana Agyemang Badu I stadium. His goal was the club's first goal in the top flight league. He played an important role in them winning the Ghana Premier League in their debut season in 2009–10 season. In February 2011, Addai was suspended indefinitely by Aduana Stars for allegedly assaulting Ben Zola, the club's assistant coach.

=== Bechem United ===
In July 2011, he joined Bechem United ahead of the 2011–12 season, their debut season in the GPL. On 10 October 2011, during the first match of the season he made his debut for the club against his old club Aduana Stars. In the process he scored his debut goal in the 75th minute of the match. The match however ended in 3–2 loss to Aduana. On 5 November 2011, he made history again by scoring in the 18th minute in a match against his former club Aduana Stars to help Bechem to a 1–1 draw and ensuring they picked their first ever league point. On 16 January 2012, he scored a brace in a 2–2 draw against Wassaman United. At the end of the season, he scored 11 goals, ending the season as the club's top goal scorer and league's third top goal scorer.

=== Hearts of Oak ===
After his impressive form, he was linked with a return to Aduana Stars and a move to Accra Hearts of Oak. In August 2012, he signed for the latter on a three-year deal, becoming on C. K. Akunnor's major signing of the season. Hearts reportedly paid 40,000 Ghana Cedis (US$20,000) for his services. His spell however with the Accra-based club took a downturn after the arrival of head coach David Duncan. This resulted in him having limited playing time due to the presence of Mahatma Otoo, James Abban and Edward Affum.

=== Return to Aduana Stars ===
At the end of the season, he rejoined his former club Aduana Stars in July 2013 after he had been linked with Bechem United and Amidaus Professionals for months. On 27 February 2015, during the 2015 season, in a match his former club Hearts of Oak, he played the full 90 minutes and scored a goal in the 83rd minute. However his goal was not enough to salvage a win as they lost by 3–2. Upon his return, on 25 April 2015, he scored a goal against his other former club Bechem United to help Aduana Stars to a 1–0 victory and push them back into second place on the league.

== Honours ==
Aduana Stars

- Ghana Division One League Zone I: 2008–09
- Ghana Premier League: 2009–10
