= Prince Gyimah =

Ghanaian footballer

Personal information
- Full name: Prince Attakora-Gyimah
- Date of birth: 25 December 1990 (age 35)
- Place of birth: Berekum, Ghana
- Height: 1.82 m (6 ft 0 in)
- Position: Forward

Team information
- Current team: Berekum Chelsea
- Number: 9

Senior career*
Years	Team	Apps	(Gls)
2007–2009	Berekum Arsenal	45	(28)
2009–2010	Kessben	30	(11)
2010–2011	BA Stars	28	(13)
2011–2013	Hearts of Oak	61	(35)
2013–	Berekum Chelsea	36	(13)

International career
2007	Ghana U-17		
- * Club domestic league appearances and goals

Prince Attakora-Gyimah (born 25 December 1990 in Berekum) is a Ghanaian footballer, who is currently playing for Berekum Chelsea in the Ghanaian Premiership.

== Career ==
Attakora-Gyimah began his career on youth side by Berekum Arsenal and joined in summer 2009 to Kessben F.C. After the dissolution of Kessben F.C. in December 2010 signed for BA Stars.

== International career ==
He was part of the Ghana Team at the Under-17 World Cup Finals, in Korea 2007.
