= Bashir Hayford =

Ghanaian football manager

Personal information
- Place of birth: Ghana

Team information
- Current team: Kpando Hearts of Lions

Managerial career
- Years: Team
- 2003–2006: Power Koforidua
- 2006–2007: Heart of Lions
- 2007–2008: Asante Kotoko
- 2010–2013: Medeama
- 2013–2017: Ashanti Gold
- 2017: Ghana U17 (women)
- 2017: Ebusua Dwarfs
- 2018: Ghana Women
- 2019: Somalia
- 2020–2021: Legon Cities
- 2021-: Kpando Hearts of Lions

Bashir Hayford is a Ghanaian football manager who currently serves as manager for Ghana Premier League side Legon Cities.

== Career ==
In August 2018, he was appointed as manager of the Ghana women's national football team. In March 2019, he was appointed as manager of the Somalia men's national football team. In February 2020, it was confirmed that Hayford had resigned from managing Somalia, due to the ongoing civil war. He has also handled Asante Kotoko, Ashanti Gold SC, Heart of Lions, Power FC, Medeama SC and Ebusua Dwarfs. He became the coach of Legon Cities FC in November 2020.

== Honours ==
=== Manager ===
Asante Kotoko

- Ghana Premier League: 2007–08

Ashanti Gold

- Ghana Premier League: 2015
