= Emmanuel Baffour =

Ghanaian professional footballer

Personal information
- Full name: Emmanuel Awuah Baffour
- Date of birth: 2 April 1989 (age 37)
- Place of birth: New Edubiase, Ashanti Region, Ghana
- Height: 1.82 m (6 ft 0 in)
- Position: Striker

Team information
- Current team: Ashanti Gold

Senior career*
| Years | Team | Apps | (Gls) |
- Ashalaja FC
| –2008 | Liberty Professionals | | |
| 2008–2010 | Tema Youth | | |
| 2010–2012 | New Edubiase United | | |
| 2012–2013 | Mamelodi Sundowns | | |
| 2014–2016 | Ashanti Gold | | |
| 2016– | Al-Ijtimai | | |

International career
| 2012 | Ghana | 1 | (0) |
- * Club domestic league appearances and goals as of 17 August 2016

Emmanuel Awuah Baffour (born 2 April 1989 in New Edubiase) is a Ghanaian professional footballer who plays for Ashanti Gold as a striker.

== Club career ==
=== Early career ===
Baffour began his playing career in the Ghanaian amateur club Ashalaja FC before moving to Premier League club Liberty Professionals. Before the 2008–2009 season, he joined Premier League club Tema Youth.

=== New Edubiase United ===
In 2010–2011 season, Baffour joined New Edubiase United. He scored 5 goals in his debut season, and during the following he scored 21 goals which made him the league's top goalscorer at the end of 2011–2012 season on 27 May 2012.

=== Mamelodi Sundowns ===
He joined Mamelodi Sundowns on 19 June 2012, signing a two-year deal with an option of an additional year.

== International career ==
=== Ghana national team ===
In December 2011, Baffour was named to the Ghana national football team's provisional 25-man squad for the 2012 Africa Cup of Nations, but was not included by the Ghana national football team technical staff for the tournament's final 23-man squad.

On 26 February 2012, Baffour was called up to the Ghana squad to face Chile. Baffour made his Ghana debut against Chile on 29 February 2012 at the PPL Park in Chester, Pennsylvania, USA.

== Honours ==
=== Individual ===
- Ghana Premier League Top Scorer (1): 2012
