= Rashid Sumaila =

Ghanaian footballer (born 1992)

Personal information
- Full name: Rashid Sumaila
- Date of birth: 18 December 1992 (age 33)
- Place of birth: Cape Coast, Central region, Ghana
- Height: 1.82 m (6 ft 0 in)
- Position: Centre back

Youth career
- 2007–2009: Astronomers and Venomous Vipers

Senior career*
Years	Team	Apps	(Gls)
2010–2012	Ebusua Dwarfs	0	(0)
2012–2013	Asante Kotoko	13	(1)
2013–2015	Mamelodi Sundowns	22	(0)
2014–2015	→ Asante Kotoko (loan)	13	(1)
2015	→ Qadsia SC (loan)	0	(0)
2015–2019	Qadsia SC	0	(0)
2016–2017	→ Al-Gharafa (loan)	21	(4)
2018–2019	→ Red Star Belgrade (loan)	3	(0)
2019–2020	Qadsia SC	10	(0)
2020–2022	Saham	0	(0)
2022-2023	Muaither	0	(0)

International career^{‡}
2011	Ghana U20	3	(0)
2011	Ghana U23		
2012–2018	Ghana	10	(0)
Medal record
Representing Ghana
Men's Football
Gold medal – first place	2011 Mozambique	Team competition
- * Club domestic league appearances and goals as of 12 August 2018 ‡ National team caps and goals as of 29 June 2018

Rashid Sumaila (born 18 December 1992) is a Ghanaian professional footballer who plays as a centre-back and he is also a member of the Ghana national team.

Sumaila won the 2011 Ghana Best Defender Award at the end of the 2010–11 Glo Premier League season.

== Clubs career ==
=== Astronomers to Venomous Vipers and Ebusua Dwarfs ===
Born in Cape Coast, Rashid Sumaila, affectionately known as Rash, began his playing career in the junior ranks of Cape Coast Adisadel-based Colts team named Astronomers where he excelled with performance and won almost everyone's hearts at the club.

In the year 2008, a division 1 club Venomous Vipers who were monitoring him keenly had to approach management of Astronomers for his signature where he was their prime target for the 2008–2009 Division 1 season.

Playing with tenacity and zeal Sumaila was then tipped as the next Sergio Ramos of Ghana football due to his consistency in the central defensive role.

The praises and hails he had with the then division on club broke the news of his performances where Ghana Premier League Clubs tried to integrate the young defender.

Prior to his abysmal performances Premier League club Ebusua Dwarfs signed him for the 2009–10 season where he progressed through the ranks at Ebusua Dwarfs and made his senior debut in the 2010–11 Glo Premier League season.

=== Asante Kotoko ===
The porcupine worries in 2012 signed their man Sumaila from Ebusua Dwarfs who they were eyeing season ago to strengthen their central defense.

As versatile as he was he played an integral part of Asante Kotoko S.C. 2012–13 season where he helped them to win the Ghana Premier League.

Notable for his tackles and strength in defense Sumaila's name was on everyone's lips of Asante Kotoko S.C. fans as he was referred as "We got our man" simply meaning they have fixed the defense now. French club RC Lens took an interest in young powerful centre-back after his first Ghana national football team call-up on 15 November 2011.

=== Mamelodi Sundowns ===
Rashid arrived for the Masandawana boys from Asante Kotoko S.C. for a permanent deal where he had already won the Ghana Premier League with the Porcupine worries.

His arrival saw a massive turn around at Mamelodi Sundowns F.C., he was very influential in the defence and played almost every match of the season where he helped them win the 2013–14 Premier Soccer League (PSL) with them.

Asante Kotoko (loan)

Sumaila returned to Kotoko on a loan deal the following season from Mamelodi Sundowns F.C. but unfortunately the Ghana Premier League was hit with setbacks and was on hold so he returned to the Mamelodi Sundowns F.C.

=== Qadsia Sc ===
The Kuwaiti side Qadsia had earlier approached Mamelodi Sundowns F.C. for a loan fee of Sumaila where initially he had returned from Kototo as the Ghana Premier League was not in progress so he landed up in Kuwait to sign a loan deal with Qadsia SC with an option to buy.

He played in the Yellow Castles as they are called. The team won the Kuwait Emir Cup for the 2014–15 season. He received the best Foreign Player in the Kuwait Premier League and Best Player of Qadsia SC respectively. As the 2015-2016 Season began he trained with them for an undisclosed fee.

They were announced the Kuwait Premier League champions for the 2015–16 season.

=== Al Gharafa ===
Sumaila was a hot cake in the Middle East where clubs where chasing here and there so Al-Gharafa SC was fortunate enough to get a loan deal of him from their sister country Kuwait side Qadsia SC.

Sumaila became a key part of the team in the 2016–17 season. He was known for his steady playing style and helped the team improve its performance throughout the year. Because of his consistent play in the yellow and blue kit, he was voted the club's Best Player at the end of the season.

Plans were, however, in advance to get him a permanent deal but Qadsia SC would not turn their attention either as they needed him back to complete his missions so Sumaila returned to his mother club to start the 2017–18 Kuwait Premier League season with the yellow castles.

=== Return to Qadsia Sc ===
Sumaila returned to his mother club Qadsia SC to begin the 2017–2018 Kuwait Premier League as an enforcer to the team.

The season was going to be a good one. the Yellow Castle where Sumaila produced one of his best season performances, from defending, to scoring goals to push the team forward. Sumaila then won the 2017–2018 Kuwait Crown Prince Cup beating their neighbors and rivals Kuwait SC in the final.

=== Red Star Belgrade ===
The quest for European football has always been the dream for Sumaila and a couple of them were knocking at his doors knowing the performances he had put in the seasons so far. On 28 June 2018 Sumaila joined the Serbian club Red Star Belgrade on one-year loan deal.

== International career ==
=== Youth ===
Sumaila was part of the Ghana national under-20 football team at the 2011 African Youth Championship. Sumaila was a member of the Ghana national under-23 football team that won Ghana's first All-Africa Games football gold medal in the Football at the 2011 All-Africa Games when they defeated South Africa national under-23 soccer team 4–2 on penalty shoot-out at the Estádio do Zimpeto in Maputo, Mozambique on 17 September 2011.

=== Senior ===
On 7 November 2011 Sumaila was called up to the Ghana squad to face Sierra Leone national football team and Gabon national football team.

In December 2011, Sumaila was named to the Ghana national football team's provisional 25-man squad for the 2012 Africa Cup of Nations, but was not included by the Ghana national football team technical staff for the tournament's final 23-man squad.

Sumaila who was in form at Mamelodi Sundowns F.C. caught the attention of coach Kwesi Appiah and was called to 2014 FIFA World Cup squad for Ghana as the final 23 squad list was announced. Ghana could not progress from the group stages but were the only team that the Germany national football team could not beat in the tournament though they were the champions of the tournament. Ghana held them to a 2–2 draw which was one of the famous matches of the tournament.

== Honours ==
Asante Kotoko

- Ghana Premier League: 2012–13

Mamelodi Sundowns

- Premier Soccer League: 2013–14

Qadsia

- Kuwait Emir Cup: 2014–2015
- Kuwait Premier League: 2015–2016
- Kuwait Crown Prince Cup: 2017–2018

Red Star Belgrade

- Serbian SuperLiga: 2018–19

Ghana U23

- All-Africa Games Gold medal: 2011

Individual

- Ghana Premier League Best Defender: 2010–11
- Ghana Premier League Best Defender: 2012–13
- Ghana MTN FA Cup Best Defender: 2012–2013
- Kuwait Premier League Best Foreign player: 2014–15
- Kuwait Premier League Best Defender: 2015–16
- Qadsia SC Best Player of the season: 2014–15
- Al-Gharafa SC Best Player of the season: 2016–17
