= Ernest Sowah =

Ghanaian footballer (born 1988)

Personal information
- Date of birth: 31 March 1988 (age 38)
- Place of birth: Accra, Greater Accra, Ghana
- Height: 1.80 m (5 ft 11 in)
- Position: Goalkeeper

Team information
- Current team: Great Olympics

Youth career
- –2007: Tema Youth

Senior career*
Years	Team	Apps	(Gls)
2007–2009	Tema Youth		
2010–2013	Berekum Chelsea		
2013–2015	CS Don Bosco		
2015–2018	Asante Kotoko		
2018–2019	Hearts of Oak		
2020–2021	Great Olympics		

International career^{‡}
2011–2015	Ghana	1	(0)
- * Club domestic league appearances and goals ‡ National team caps and goals as of 22:40, 11 February 2012 (UTC)

Ernest Sowah (born 31 March 1988,) is a Ghanaian professional footballer who plays as a goalkeeper for Great Olympics.

== Club career ==
Sowah, a former member of Tema Youth, was regarded as one of the most promising goalkeepers in Ghana in 2007 and 2008.

== International career ==
Sowah made his debut for Ghana in a friendly versus China on 15 August 2012. He played for the Ghana national team at the 2012 Africa Cup of Nations.

== Honours ==
Berekum Chelsea

- Ghana Premier League: 2010–11

Asante Kotoko

- Ghanaian FA Cup: 2017

Ghana

- Africa Cup of Nations runner-up:2015
