= Samuel Ato Ghansah =

Ghanaian football midfielder (born 1993)

Samuel Ghansah
Personal information
- Full name: Samuel Ato Ghansah
- Date of birth: 31 March 1993 (age 33)
- Place of birth: Ghana
- Height: 1.80 m (5 ft 11 in)

Youth career
- 2009–2010: Inter Allies Football Club
- 2010–2011: Kessben FC
- 2010–2011: Sekondi Eleven Wise

Senior career*
Years	Team	Apps	(Gls)
2010–2011	Tudu Mighty Jets FC	23	(8)
2011–2012	Medeama SC	17	(6)
2012–2013	Ebusua Dwarfs	12	(5)
2013–2014	Dedebit F.C.	21	(7)
2014–2015	EEPCO	22	(9)
2015–2016	Jimma Ketema	16	(5)
2016–2017	Avenues United	7	(2)
2017–2018	AS Kasserine	5	(0)
- * Club domestic league appearances and goals as of 14:00, 23 May 2018 (UTC)

Samuel Ato Ghansah (born 31 March 1993) is a Ghanaian footballer who plays as a midfielder.

== Career ==
Ghansah played youth football for Ghanaian clubs Inter Allies Football Club from 2009 to 2010, Kessben FC from 2010 to 2011 and Sekondi Eleven Wise.

He played 2010–11 with Tudu Mighty Jets FC. His first senior goal at Tudu Mighty Jets FC came on 12 January 2011 when he scored the equalizer in a 2–1 home win over B.A. Stars in the 17th Week of Glo Premier League. He moved to Medeama SC in 2011/12 season, At the end of his first season he got transferred on loan to Cape Coast base team Ebusua Dwarfs.He then moved to Dedebit F.C.

On 13 August 2014, Ghansah joined Ethiopian side EEPCO on a free transfer. In 2016/2017 he moved to Jimma Ketema, Avenues United and AS Kasserine 2017–2018.
