= Joseph Tetteh Zutah =

Ghanaian professional footballer (born 1994)

Personal information
- Date of birth: 22 August 1994 (age 32)
- Position: Midfielder

Senior career*
Years	Team	Apps	(Gls)
2013–2015	Medeama		
2016–2017	Young Africans		
2017–2023	Medeama	74	(6)
- * Club domestic league appearances and goals

Joseph Tetteh Zutah (born 22 August 1994) is a Ghanaian former professional footballer. He played as midfielder and captained Ghana Premier League side Medeama for majority of his career.

A Mathematics and Statistics graduate of the University of Cape Coast. Zutah played for the university whilst studying for his degree before joining Tarkwa-based team Medeama. He also played for Tanzanian-side Young Africans.

== Early life and education ==
Zutah was born on 22 August 1994. He studied at the University of Cape Coast, where he graduated with a Bachelor of Science degree in Mathematics and Statistics.

== Club career ==
=== Medeama SC ===
Zutah played for Tarkwa-based side Medeama SC from 2013 to 2015. He made his debut in 2013, during the 2013–14 Ghana Premier League season under Hans van der Pluijm. He played in the Ghana Premier League and remained as a key member of the club within that period helping the club to the win the Ghanaian FA Cup in 2013 and 2015. On the road to 2015 FA Cup win, during a quarter-final clash against West African Football Academy (WAFA) on 24 June 2015, his goal along with a brace from Kwasi Donsu helped to secure a 3–1 victory to schedule a semi-final match against Accra Hearts of Oak.

=== Young Africans ===
In July 2015, Zutah signed a two-year deal with Tanzanian-side Young Africans from Medeama SC, after being recommended by his the club's manager Hans van der Pluijm who managed him at Medeama SC and gave him his professional debut in 2013.

During his only season with the club he played a key role in helping them retain the Tanzanian Premier League by winning the 2015–16 Tanzanian Premier League. With one year left on his contract, he later parted ways with the club in May 2016 by mutual consent.

=== Return to Medeama SC ===
In late 2016, Zutah returned to his old cub, Medeama SC after parting with Young Africans. In February 2017, he was appointed as the club's new captain. Upon his return, he featured in 16 league appearances during the 2017 Ghana Premier League season.

During the 2018 Ghana Premier League season, He made 11 league appearances and scored 1 goal before the league was abandoned due to the dissolution of the Ghana Football Association (GFA) in June 2018 as a result of the Anas Number 12 Expose. In March 2020, he signed a new contract with the club after initial contract expired, signing a one and half year deal which was to keep him at the Tarkwa outift until August 2021, with an option to extend.

During 2019–20 Ghana Premier League season, he continued in his role as club captain but featured in a limited number of 5 matches for Samuel Boadu's team before the league was cancelled as a result of the COVID-19 pandemic.

In both 2020 and 2021, he was linked with moves to Accra Hearts of Oak during the transfer period, but he denied reports of his move.

== Personal life ==
On 19 November 2018, he was involved in a minor motor accident in Tarkwa, sustaining minor injuries. He was discharged from the hospital that same day.

In November 2019, Medeama SC announced that their club captain was getting married. On 30 November 2019, Zutah tied the knot with his long-time girlfriend Doris Agyarkoh at Church of Pentecost E.K Temple in Tarkwa, Western Region of Ghana. The wedding was preceded by a Ghanaian traditional marriage ceremony.

== Honours ==
Medeama SC

- Ghana Premier League: 2022–23
- Ghanaian FA Cup: 2013, 2015

Young Africans

- Tanzanian Premier League: 2015–16
