= Techiman City FC =

Techiman City
- Full name: Techiman City Football Club
- Nickname: The Citizens
- Ground: Ohene Ameyaw Park
- Capacity: 5,000
- League: Division One
- 2016: 14th
| Home colours | Away colours |

Techiman City FC is a football club in Techiman, Ghana.

== Colors and kit ==
Techiman City's home colors are green with a vertical red stripe down the middle, while their away jersey is purple and white quarters. Some of their equipment was donated by philanthropic supporters in Canada and the United States.

== Recent history ==
It gained promotion to the 2016 Ghanaian Premier League with Ebusua Dwarfs and Dreams F.C. which was helped with two free 3-0 wins. Berlin F.C. failed to attend a match and Bolga All Stars lost their case against Techiman City who inveighed against them for fielding four unqualified players.

Techiman City were demoted to the Ghana Division One after losing 4–0 to Berekum Chelsea F.C. in the final day. This was despite winning a free game as New Edubiase United FC fielded an unqualified player. An immense proportion of 10,000 Ghanaian cedis was given to the club after sponsors Sasso Insectiside Spray promised them that sum if they won Accra Hearts of Oak. They managed a draw but the sponsor gave Techiman City that amount anyway.

Securing their sponsorship deal with Bio-Global Investments (manufacturers and distributors of Rox Energy Drink) in 2016, it will be their official drink sponsor until summer 2017. Nasona Oil was supposed to have been Techiman City's sponsor but Nasona Oil denied such reports, saying that 'they have not signed a deal with Techiman city'. As a result, Techiman City FC were demoted to Division Two.

Placed an injunction on the Ghana Football Association in February 2016 for being put into the Ghana Division Two as they were thought to have fixed a game. They withdrew their request on the Ghana Football Association a year later.

== Sponsors ==
- Nasona Oil(2015–2016)
- Samara Company Limited(2016)
- Bio-Global Investments(2016–2017)

2016 Ghanaian Premier League
