= 2010–11 Ghana Premier League =

2010–11 Glo Premier League
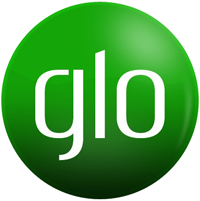
- Season: 2010–11
- Champions: Berekum Chelsea
- Champions League: Berekum Chelsea
- 2012 CAF Confederation Cup: Nania (Ghanaian FA Cup winner)
- Top goalscorer: (Ghana) Nana Poku (16 goals)

The 2010–11 Ghanaian Premier League (known as the Glo Premier League for sponsorship reasons) season was the 52nd season of top-tier football in Ghana. The competition began on 5 September 2010, and ended on 5 June 2011.

== Team movement ==
=== Promoted to 2010–11 Ghanaian Premier League ===
- BA Stars
- Tudu Mighty Jets
- Ebusua Dwarfs

=== Relegated to 2010–11 Ghanaian Football Leagues ===
- Great Olympics
- Eleven Wise
- Sekondi Hasaacas

== Teams ==
Team	City
Aduana Stars	Dormaa Ahenkro
All Stars	Wa
Asante Kotoko	Kumasi
Ashanti Gold	Obuasi
Berekum Chelsea	Berekum
Berekum Arsenal	Berekum
BA Stars	Sunyani
Ebusua Dwarfs	Cape Coast
Heart of Lions	Kpandu
Hearts of Oak	Accra
Medeama SC	Kumasi
King Faisal Babes	Kumasi
Liberty Professionals	Accra
Tudu Mighty Jets	Accra
New Edubiase United	Tamale
Real Tamale United	Tamale

=== Name changes ===
2011: Kessben F.C. were renamed to Medeama SC.

== Standings ==
Pos	Team	Pld	W	D	L	GF	GA	GD	Pts	Qualification or relegation
1	Berekum Chelsea (C)	30	18	3	9	33	26	+7	57	Qualification for 2012 CAF Champions League
2	Ashanti Gold SC	30	13	8	9	24	14	+10	47	
3	Asante Kotoko	30	13	7	10	36	27	+9	46	
4	Medeama SC	30	12	10	8	35	31	+4	46	
5	Aduana Stars	30	12	9	9	20	18	+2	45	
6	Liberty Professionals	30	12	7	11	31	29	+2	43	
7	Accra Hearts of Oak SC	30	13	4	13	26	22	+4	43	
8	New Edubiase United	30	11	10	9	33	32	+1	43	
9	Heart of Lions	30	10	11	9	22	21	+1	41	
10	Berekum Arsenal	30	11	8	11	30	34	−4	41	
11	Ebusua Dwarfs	30	11	8	11	30	24	+6	41	
12	All Stars F.C.	30	10	9	11	29	29	0	39	
13	Tudu Mighty Jets	30	11	4	15	24	30	−6	37	
14	King Faisal Babes (R)	30	10	6	14	26	32	−6	36	Relegation to Ghanaian Football Leagues
15	Real Tamale United (R)	30	9	6	15	24	26	−2	33	Relegation to Ghanaian Football Leagues
16	BA Stars (R)	30	7	4	19	16	44	−28	22 (Note: BA Stars were docked 3 points)	Relegation to Ghanaian Football Leagues

Updated to match(es) played on 5 June 2011. Source: FIFA.com
Rules for classification: 1) points; 2) goal difference; 3) number of goals scored.
Nania qualified for the 2012 CAF Confederation Cup as the 2010–11 Ghanaian FA Cup winner.
(C) Champions; (R) Relegated
