= Sheriff Deo Mohammed =

Ghanaian international football player

Sheriff Deo
Personal information
- Full name: Sheriff Deo Mohammed
- Date of birth: May 8, 1993 (age 33)
- Place of birth: Accra, Ghana
- Height: 1.90 m (6 ft 3 in)
- Position: Forward

Senior career*
Years	Team	Apps	(Gls)
2014–2016	International Allies	26	(9)
2017–2019	Stumbras	3	(0)
2018	→ Kupiškis (loan)	–	(12)
2018	→ Gafanha (loan)	10	(2)
2019	→ Águeda (loan)	15	(4)
2019–2020	Arouca	18	(3)
2020–	Gondomar	16	(1)

International career
2015	Ghana	1	(0)
- * Club domestic league appearances and goals

Sheriff Deo Mohammed (born 8 May 1993) is a Ghanaian professional footballer who currently plays as forward for Portuguese club Gondomar.

== Club career ==
=== Inter Allies ===
In 2014, Mohammed joined Ghanaian club International Allies FC. He scored 9 goals, assisted 3 goals and ended as the top goal scorer of the club in his debut season, 2015 Ghanaian Premier League. Due to his impressive form, he ended the season as the club's best player and his contract was extended by an extra year set to expire in 2016. In late December 2015, he went on trails at Al Mokawloon Al Arab SC.

=== Stumbras ===
On 10 October 2017 after his contract with Inter Allies had ended, Mohammed joined Lithuanian side FC Stumbras which was being managed by former Ghana national team coach Mariano Barreto. He signed a three-year deal with the side. Two days after, he made his debut after coming on in the final minutes to 19 minutes of a 3–2 defeat to FK Atlantas. In his first season, he helped them to prevent relegation, playing in both relegation playoffs for the 2017 A Lyga season. Over the following two and half years, he played on loan at FC Kupiškis in 2018 before moving Portugal to play on loan for G.D. Gafanha and R.D. Águeda between late 2018 to early 2019 respectively. During his time at Kupiškis, he scored 12 league goals.

=== Arouca ===
His previous performances for G.D. Gafanha and R.D. Águeda in the Campeonato de Portugal league attracted interest from other clubs within the league. Due to that, he was signed by F.C. Arouca in July 2019 on a one-year deal on a free transfer as the club sought for a way back into the Liga Portugal 2 after being relegated the previous season. During his only season, 2019–20 season, he became one of the club's top performers in the process playing 18 league matches scored 3 goals and made 7 assists to help them gain automatic qualification in to the Liga Portugal 2. They gained promotion for being one of the two teams with the most points in all first-stage series before Portuguese Football Federation (FPF) cancelled all non-professional competitions due to the COVID-19 pandemic in Portugal. During their 2019–20 Taça de Portugal campaign, in a match against S.C. Espinho, he came off the bench to score in the 94th minute of additional time to being the match to a 2–2 level and help push the match into an extra time. However they lost the match in extra time after Bruno Valente scored a goal in the 113th minute.

=== Gondomar ===
In July 2020, Mohammed joined fellow Portuguese team Gondomar S.C. on a one-year contract as free agent following the expiration of his contract with FC Arouca and was set to extend his stay in Campeonato de Portugal league.

== International career ==
In October 2015, he was called up into the local Black Stars, Ghana national football team by Maxwell Konadu for a double header CHAN 2016 qualifier against Ivory Coast. On 18 October 2015, he started the match along with striking partner Joel Fameyeh and played the 65 minutes before being substituted for Nuhu Fuseini to make his debut in the first leg at the Baba Yara Sports Stadium, Kumasi which ended in a 2–1 victory. Fameyeh scored the brace to earn them the victory.

== Honours ==
Arouca

- Campeonato de Portugal: 2019–20 (promotion)
