= Benjamin Twum =

Ghanaian professional footballer (born 2005)

Personal information
- Full name: Benjamin Twum
- Place of birth: Ghana
- Position: Goalkeeper

Team information
- Current team: Asante Kotoko S.C.
- Number: 13

Youth career
- Young Apostles FC

Senior career*
Years	Team	Apps	(Gls)
–2024	Young Apostles FC		
2024–	Asante Kotoko	1	(0)

International career
2024–	Ghana U20		
- * Club domestic league appearances and goals

Benjamin Twum (born 2005) is a Ghanaian professional footballer who plays as a goalkeeper for Ghana Premier League club Asante Kotoko and the Ghana national under-20 team.

== Club career ==
Twum began his career with Ghana Division One League side Young Apostles FC During the 2023–24 season, he appeared in the promotion play-offs, where he saved penalties in a shootout against Techiman Heroes.

In January 2025, Twum signed a three-and-a-half-year contract with Asante Kotoko S.C., joining the club ahead of the second half of the 2024–25 Ghana Premier League season. He was unveiled at the Baba Yara Sports Stadium before a league match against Bibiani Gold Stars and was assigned the number 13 shirt.

== International career ==
Twum has represented Ghana at under-20 level with the Black Satellites, helping the team reach the final of the 2025 WAFU Zone B U-20 Championship.

== Career statistics ==
=== Club ===
Season	Club	League	Apps	Goals
2024–25	Asante Kotoko S.C.	Ghana Premier League	1	0
Total			1	0
