= Kofi Owusu =

Ghanaian footballer (born 1991)

Personal information
- Full name: Kofi Owusu
- Date of birth: 5 April 1991 (age 35)
- Place of birth: Buduburam, Ghana
- Height: 1.67 m (5 ft 6 in)
- Position: Striker

Senior career*
Years	Team	Apps	(Gls)
2008–2009	Okwawu United		
2009–2010	Liberty Professionals		
2010–2012	Mighty Jets		
2012–2013	King Faisal		
2013–2014	Aduana Stars		
2014–2016	Berekum Chelsea	16	(19)
2016	Aswan SC	8	(0)
2016–2017	Ashanti Gold	8	(3)
2018	Salitas		
2019–2022	Berekum Chelsea	60	(11)
- * Club domestic league appearances and goals

Kofi Owusu (born 5 April 1991) is a Ghanaian professional footballer who plays as a striker for Ghana Premier League side Berekum Chelsea. He has played for Aswan SC in Egypt and Salitas FC in Burkina Faso, along with playing for Ghana Premier League top teams, Aduana Stars, Ashanti Gold and King Faisal. He won the Ghana Premier League Goal King for the 2015 season.

== Career ==
Owusu previously played for Ashanti Gold and Aswan FC in Egypt. Owusu started his career at Okwawu United, he later moved to Liberty Professionals, Mighty Jets, King Faisal and Aduana Stars.

=== Berekum Chelsea ===
He gained prominence in 2015 Ghanaian Premier League after he had moved to Berekum Chelsea in 2014. He helped Berekum Chelsea when they took the public by a surprise and placed 4th in the league. During the first half of the season, he scored six goals, when the second half began he scored consistently. He was named as the league's player of the month in July 2015 after scoring eleven goals during that period. He scored two more goals in the final round to take the golden boot and be crowned the league's top scorer with 19 goals leading one goal to Nathaniel Asamoah, who left for Raja Casablanca with two more rounds left. Owusu was also nominated for the League Player of the Year Award.

=== Aswan SC ===
"Kotoko were desperately looking for me after I won the goal-king but I had a better deal in Egypt, Rather unfortunately for Kotoko, I got an offer from Egypt which led me turning down their offer".

— Owusu talking about snubbing Kotoko for Aswan.

Owusu did not return to Berekum Chelsea's pre-season training after his successful season and was not included in the squad for the pre-season tournament, the GHALCA 6 . Due his form and exploits in the previous season, it placed him a position to be signed by a bigger club. Clubs like TP Mazembe, Ashanti Gold, Asante Kotoko as well as clubs in South Africa and Sweden made enquiries and showed an interest in signing him, but Owusu signed instead a four-year contract on 1 February 2016 with Egyptian club Aswan SC. In June 2020, he stated that he had to snub Kumasi-based team Asante Kotoko for Aswan SC because he received an offer in Egypt.

=== Ashanti Golds ===
After a less successful a year in Egypt, Owusu returned to Ghana when his contract with Aswan was terminated. In 2016, he signed a three-year contract for Ashanti Gold who won the league the previous year in 2015. Owusu's time at Ashanti Gold was less successful, he played eight matches and scored three goals whilst the club struggled to stay in the top league. In December 2017, he terminated his contract with the Obuasi-based club. The parties mutually broke the contract despite one year remaining.

=== Salitas FC ===
Owusu instead moved to Ouagadougou and signed in January 2018 on a one-year contract with another option year for Salitas FC in Burkina Faso's top flight league. He spent only one season with the club.

=== Return to Berekum Chelsea ===
In December 2019, Owusu signed 3-year deal with his former club Berekum Chelsea ahead of the 2019–20 season, after playing for the club from 2014 to 2016.

== International career ==
After the 2015 campaign in which he had firmly established his position as a good finisher in the Ghana Premier League after winning the top goal scorer, Owusu was called up to be part of the local Black Stars squad that faced Ivory Coast in the qualifiers of the 2016 African Nations Championship. after an injury although he was declared fit, he did not play.

== Honours ==
Individual

- Ghana Premier League Top Scorer: 2014–15
- Ghana Premier League Player of the Month: July 2015
