= Baffour =

Baffour is both a surname and a given name by the Ashanti people from Ghana. Notable people with the name include:

Surname:

- Emmanuel Baffour (born 1989), Ghanaian footballer
- Fritz Baffour (born 1952), Ghanaian journalist, politician and communications consultant
- R. P. Baffour, Ghanaian academic

Given name:

- Baffour Gyan (born 1980), Ghanaian professional footballer
