= Baba Abdulai Musah =

Ghanaian footballer (born

Baba Musah
Personal information
- Full name: Baba Abdulai Musah
- Date of birth: 18 December 1996 (age 29)
- Position: Defender

Team information
- Current team: Al-Khaburah

Senior career*
Years	Team	Apps	(Gls)
2017–2020	Tema Youth	17	(0)
2020–2024	Medeama	76	(0)
2024–2025	Nejmeh	1	(0)
2025–	Al-Khaburah	1	(0)
- * Club domestic league appearances and goals as of 12:37, 19 September 2025 (UTC)

Baba Abdulai Musah (born 18 December 1996) is a Ghanaian professional footballer who plays as defender for Omani club Al-Khaburah.

He previously had stints with Tema Youth, Nania and Medeama in Ghana.

== Career ==
=== Early career ===
Musah played for lower-tier side Nania FC for two seasons before moving to Tema Youth.

=== Tema Youth ===
In 2017, he moved to Tema Youth. He played there for three seasons from 2017 to 2020. He featured for them when they played in the 2017 Ghana Premier League season. He played in 17 league matches that season, with Tema Youth placing 14th and being relegated to the Ghana Division One League.

=== Medeama SC ===
On 26 October 2020, Medeama SC announced that Musah had signed on a free transfer. He signed a three-year deal with the club to expire in 2023. He made his debut on 12 December 2020, in a 1–0 victory over Ebusua Dwarfs, coming on in the 48th minute for Daniel Egyin.
