= Nicholas Odjer =

Ghanaian footballer

Personal information
- Full name: Nicholas Odjer
- Date of birth: 3 May 1995 (age 31)
- Place of birth: Tema, Ghana
- Height: 1.60 m (5 ft 3 in)
- Position: Winger

Team information
- Current team: Tema Youth SC
- Number: 10

Youth career
- Mighty Eagles

Senior career*
Years	Team	Apps	(Gls)
2012–	Tema Youth SC	58	(32)
- * Club domestic league appearances and goals as of 26 June 2018

Nicholas Odjer (born 3 May 1995) is a Ghanaian footballer who plays as a winger for Tema Youth SC.

== Club career ==
Odjer started playing for youth side Mighty Eagles. He made his senior debuts for Tema Youth sc in 2012, aged only 16. Odjer Scored his first goal for Tema Youth when he came on as a substitute in a 1–1 draw with Wassaman in 2012. . Nicholas odjer is the senior brother of Moses Odjer who plays for Italian seria B side Salernitana.
