= Emmanuel Hammond =

Ghanaian footballer

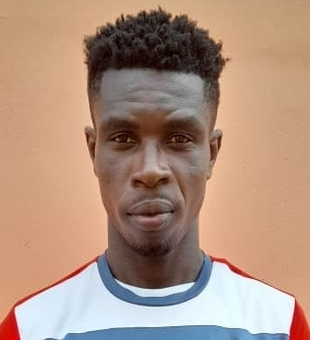

Personal information
- Full name: Emmanuel Hammond
- Date of birth: 9 February 1997 (age 29)
- Place of birth: Accra, Greater Accra GH
- Height: 1.82 m (6 ft 0 in)
- Position: Forward

Team information
- Current team: Heart Of Lions

Youth career
- 2007–2015: Mighty Victory Colts Club (Accra)

Senior career*
Years	Team	Apps	(Gls)
2016–2018	Heart Of Lions	69	(33)
2018–2020	Inter Allies	2	
2020	→ Heart Of Lions (loan)	25	(10)
- * Club domestic league appearances and goals

Emmanuel Hammond (born 9 February 1997) is a Ghanaian footballer who plays as a forward for Ghanaian Division One League side Heart Of Lions.

== Club career ==
=== Early career ===
Emmanuel began his football career with a youth club Mighty Victory in Accra. Emmanuel later moved to Heart Of Lions in Kpando. He stayed at Heart Of Lions for 3 season and later joined Ghana Premier League side Inter Allies.

=== Inter Allies ===
In May 2018, Emmanuel signed to Ghana Premier League club Inter Allies on a three-year deal

=== Hearts Of lions ===
In October 2020, Emmanuel signed to Heart Of Lions on loan.
