= Seidu Bancey =

Ghanaian footballer (born 1990)

Personal information
- Full name: Seidu Bancey
- Date of birth: 15 May 1990 (age 36)
- Place of birth: Tema, Greater Accra, Ghana
- Height: 1.83 m (6 ft 0 in)
- Position: Striker

Team information
- Current team: Arba Minch

Senior career*
Years	Team	Apps	(Gls)
2010–2012	Ebusua Dwarfs	32	(16)
2012–2014	Asante Kotoko	70	(37)
2014–2015	Smouha	15	(8)
2016	Asante Kotoko	13	(6)
2016–2017	Al Nabi Sheet	?	(?)
2017–18	ES Zarzis	4	(0)

International career
2013	Ghana U17	8	(2)
2011	Ghana U23	13	(4)
2014	Ghana	4	(0)
- * Club domestic league appearances and goals

Seidu Bancey (born 15 May 1990) is a professional footballer who plays as a striker for ES Zarzis in Tunisia.

== Club career ==
Bancey signed for Ebusua Dwarfs in the 2010–2011 season and played for the club until the end of the 2011–2012 season and Bancey signed for Asante Kotoko on 1 July 2012. He was the highest goal scorer for the 2013/2014 season in the Ghanaian Premier league.

=== Egypt ===
He signed a two-year contract with Egyptian Premier club Smouha Sporting Club in September 2014, but mutually agreed to terminate the contract, due to the situation in Egypt.

== International career ==
Bancey competed with the Ghana national under-23 football team in the 2011 CAF U-23 Championship qualification and 2014 African Nations Championship.
