= Goran Barjaktarević =

German football manager (born 1969)

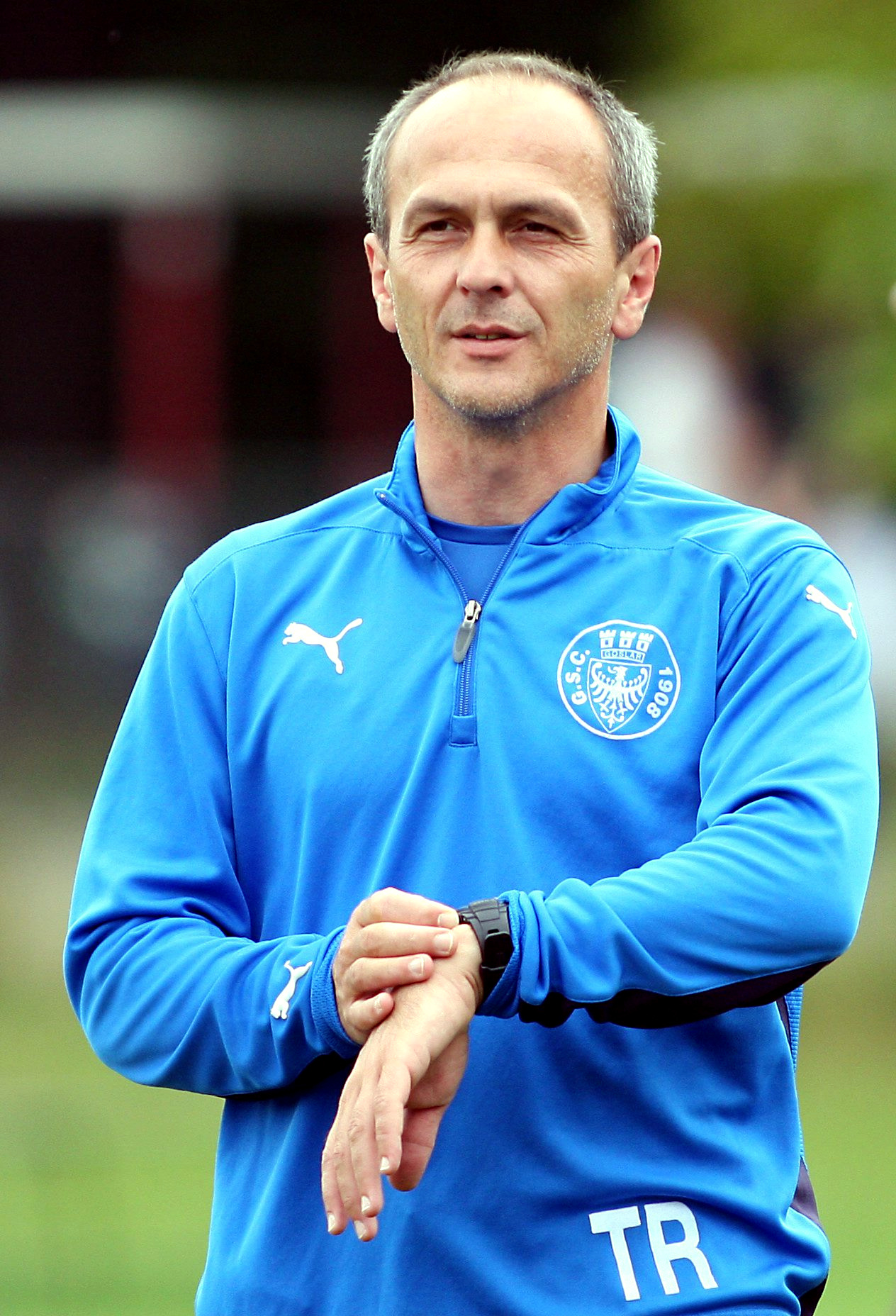

Personal information
- Date of birth: 25 May 1969 (age 57)
- Place of birth: Zenica, Yugoslavia
- Height: 1.80 m (5 ft 11 in)
- Position: Midfielder

Senior career*
Years	Team	Apps	(Gls)
- FC Koper
- Red Star
1992	Leiftur	18	(1)
1993	FUS Rabat		
1994-1995	Obilić	3	(0)
1995–1996	SV Wilhelmshaven	1	(0)
1996–1997	Atlas Delmenhorst	4	(0)

Managerial career
- 2005–2006: Brinkumer SV
- 2007–2010: Goslarer SC 08
- 2011–2013: Eintracht Braunschweig U19
- 2013–2015: Hammer SpVg
- 2017–2018: I.G. Bönen
- 2018: Chonburi
- 2019–2020: Legon Cities
- * Club domestic league appearances and goals

Goran Barjaktarević (born 25 May 1969) is a German football manager and former player.

== Playing career ==
Barjaktarević was born in Zenica, Yugoslavia and played youth football at NK Čelik Zenica. He went on to play for FC Koper and Belgrade-based clubs Red Star and FK Obilić.

With Yugoslavia in civil war, he moved to Icelandic second tier side ÍF Leiftur.

He played for Moroccan side FUS Rabat during the 1992–93 season.

== Managerial career ==
Barjaktarević was appointed manager of Goslarer SC 08 in 2007. He helped the club to two successive promotions, from the Bezirksoberliga to the Regionalliga Nord. He was dismissed in January 2010 with the club placed last.

From 2011 to 2013, he coached the U19 team of Eintracht Braunschweig.

On 5 January 2018, he left German amateur club I.G. Bönen to become manager of Thai League 1 side Chonburi.

Barjaktarević was appointed manager of Ghanaian side Wa All Stars FC in December 2019, ahead of the 2019–20 Ghana Premier League. His stint with the club, renamed to Legon Cities, ended in November with 2020 just two matches of the 2020–21 season played.

== Outside football ==
Barjaktarević has university degrees in psychology and economics from universities in Düsseldorf and Hamburg.
