= Kofi Nti Boakye =

Ghanaian player (born 1987)

Kofi Nti
Personal information
- Full name: Kofi Nti Boakye
- Date of birth: 5 April 1987 (age 39)
- Place of birth: Ghana
- Height: 5 ft 8 in (1.73 m)
- Positions: Striker; attacking midfielder

Youth career
- Ghana Academicals

Senior career*
Years	Team	Apps	(Gls)
2003–2004	Corners Babies F.C.		
2005–2006	Ghana Academicals		
2006–2008	Liberty Professionals FC		
2008–2010	Heart of Lions		
2011–2013	Asante Kotoko FC		
2013–2014	Al Ahli		
2014–2015	Misr Lel-Makkasa		
2015–2016	Ifeanyi Ubah FC		
2016	Ijtimaai FC		
2016–2018	Heart of Lions		
2018–2019	Al-Qaisumah		

International career
2009	Ghana	1	(0)
- * Club domestic league appearances and goals

Kofi Nti Boakye (born 5 April 1987) is a Ghanaian football player who plays as a striker or attacking midfielder.

== Career ==
=== Early career ===
Former member of Ghana Academicals, he scored 8 goals in 15 League matches 2005 and was member of the Ghana Premier League All Star team 2007. Boakye began his career with Corners Babies in 2003. He later went on to join Ghanaian Premier League club Liberty Professionals FC aiding the club in taking the WAFU Cup and President Cup.

=== Heart of Lions ===
In 2008, Boakye joined Ghanaian Premier League club Heart of Lions playing for two seasons. He also assisted the club in qualifying for the African Confederation Cup.

=== Asante Kotoko ===
Boakye later signed with Ghanaian Premier League club Asante Kotoko. He played for two seasons with the premier club and later became the Captain of the team. They went on to take the MTN FA Cup and qualified in the African Confederation Cup.

=== Al Ahli SC ===
In 2013, Boakye signed with Libyan side Al Ahli SC, He also played for Egyptian side Misr Lel Makkasa for another season before going on to play for Ifeanyi Ubah FC in 2015.

=== Shabab Al ===
In September 2017, Boakye Lebanese Premier League side Al Shabab.

== International career ==
Boakye's first call up for the Ghana national football team was for a friendly match against Argentina national football team in September 2009. On 30 September 2009, during the friendly match, he started the match and played 57th minutes to mark his international debut.

== Personal life ==
He is the brother of Isaac Boakye, the German-based player.

== Honours ==
Asante Kotoko

- Ghana Premier League: 2011–12, 2012–13

Al Ahli

- Libyan Premier League: 2013–14

Ifeanyi Ubah

- Nigeria FA Cup: 2016
