= Hans van der Pluijm =

Dutch footballer (born 1949)

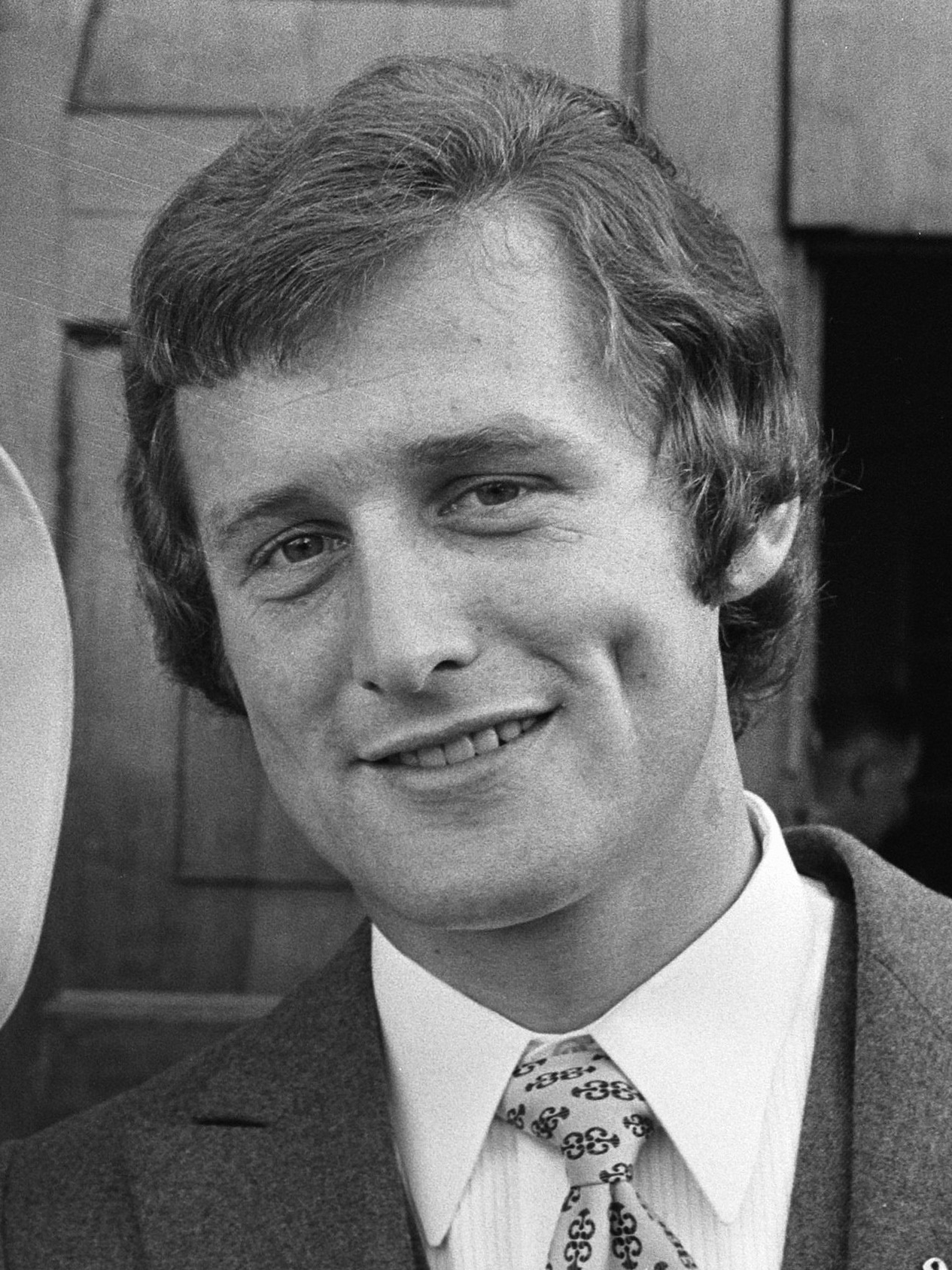
- Van der Pluijm in 1971

Personal information
- Full name: Johannes Franciscus van der Pluijm
- Date of birth: 3 January 1949 (age 77)
- Place of birth: Nieuwkuijk, Netherlands
- Height: 1.75 m (5 ft 9 in)
- Position: Goalkeeper

Team information
- Current team: Singida BS

Youth career
- RKVV Nieuwkuijk
- 1965–1967: Wilhelmina

Senior career*
Years	Team	Apps	(Gls)
1967–1986	Den Bosch	338	(0)

Managerial career
- 1987–1989: Den Bosch U18
- 1990–1992: Den Bosch (assistant)
- 1993–1995: Den Bosch
- 1995–1996: Excelsior
- 1998: Shizuoka U18
- 1998–2001: Ashanti Gold
- 2002–2003: Heart of Lions
- 2003–2004: Saint George
- 2004–2005: Ashanti Gold
- 2005–2006: Heart of Lions
- 2006–2007: Red Bull Ghana (academy)
- 2007–2008: Kessben
- 2008–2010: Feyenoord Soccer Academy (Gomoa)
- 2011–2013: Berekum Chelsea
- 2013–2014: Medeama
- 2014–2017: Young Africans
- 2017–2018: Singida United
- 2018–2019: Azam
- 2022–: Singida Fountain Gate
- * Club domestic league appearances and goals

Hans van der Pluijm (born 3 January 1949) is a Dutch football coach and former player who coaches Singida BS. in Tanzania.

== Playing career ==
A former goalkeeper, he played almost 20 years for Den Bosch between 1967 and 1986. He made 66 Eredivisie games for them and was succeeded between the posts by another Den Bosch legend, Jan van Grinsven.

== Managerial career ==
After retiring, van der Pluijm was the manager of Den Bosch until 1995. He then spent a season with Excelsior and has worked in Afrika since 1999. He was manager in Ghana, Ethiopia and Tanzania and married a Ghanaian woman.

His best achievement as a coach/manager was the final of the Dutch Cup in 1991, which Den Bosch lost 1–0.
