= Paul de Vries (footballer) =

Ghanaian footballer

Personal information
- Full name: Paul de Vries Asare
- Date of birth: 3 March 1996 (age 30)
- Place of birth: Accra, Ghana
- Position: Forward

Team information
- Current team: Wa All Stars
- Number: 10

Youth career
- FC Vison

International career
| Years | Team | Apps | (Gls) |
| 2011–2014 | Ghana U17 | 11 | (6) |

Paul de Vries Asare (born 3 March 1996) is a Ghanaian professional footballer who currently plays for Wa All Stars in the Ghana Premier League.

== Career ==
de Vries has played for several Ghanaian teams and is currently playing with Wa All Stars as a forward.

== International career ==
In November 2013, coach Maxwell Konadu invited him to be a part of the Ghana squad for the 2013 WAFU Nations Cup. He helped the team to a first-place finish after Ghana beat Senegal by three goals to one.

Asare was part of the squad that participated in the 2014 African Nations Championship.
