= Godfred Yeboah =

Ghanaian footballer (1980–2021)

Personal information
- Date of birth: 27 July 1980
- Place of birth: Ghana
- Date of death: 3 August 2021 (aged 41)
- Place of death: Sunyani, Ghana
- Position: Defender

Senior career*
Years	Team	Apps	(Gls)
2003–2011	Asante Kotoko		
2006	→ Ashanti Gold (loan)		
2008–2009	→ All Stars F.C. (loan)		

International career
2003–2008	Ghana	3	(0)
- * Club domestic league appearances and goals

Godfred Yeboah (27 July 1980 – 3 August 2021) was a Ghanaian professional footballer who played as a defender.

== Career ==
Yeboah played one season for BA United before joining Asante Kotoko. He spent most of his career with Asante Kotoko, staying from 2001 till 2009. He won three league titles in the 2003, 2005 and 2007–08 seasons, and the Ghanaian FA Cup in 2001.

He moved from Asante Kotoko to All Stars F.C. on loan on 4 January 2008, along with the Asante Kotoko teammate Kobina Dodzie, while a third player, Habib Mohamed, moved permanently. He was on loan from January 2007 to June 2007 at Ashanti Gold and stands here in the Ghana Premier League All Star team.

== Death ==
He died on 3 August 2021 at the age of 41.
