= Dominic Frimpong =

Ghanaian footballer (2005–2026)

Personal information
- Date of birth: 26 August 2005
- Place of birth: Accra, Ghana
- Date of death: 12 April 2026 (aged 20)
- Place of death: Ghana
- Height: 1.80 m (5 ft 11 in)
- Position: Winger

Senior career*
Years	Team	Apps	(Gls)
2025–2026	Aduana Football Club		
2025–2026	→ Berekum Chelsea (loan)	13	(2)
- * Club domestic league appearances and goals

Dominic Frimpong (26 August 2005 – 12 April 2026) was a Ghanaian professional footballer who played as a winger for Ghana Premier League club Berekum Chelsea.

== Career ==
Frimpong was born in Accra, Ghana, on 26 August 2005. He played in the Ghana Premier League for Berekum Chelsea. He joined the club on loan from Aduana Football Club during the 2025–26 season. During his spell at Berekum Chelsea, he made 13 league appearances and scored two goals.

== Death ==
On 12 April 2026, Frimpong was killed when the Berekum Chelsea team bus was attacked by armed robbers while returning from a Premier League match against Samartex. Masked gunmen blocked the road and opened fire on the bus as it attempted to reverse. Players and staff fled into nearby bushes for safety, but Frimpong was struck by gunfire and later died from his injuries at the hospital. Frimpong was 20, and was the only reported fatality in the attack.

The GFA announced Frimpong would be honored during the MTN FA Cup semi-finals and the Women’s Premier League final. The Confederation of African Football and FIFA expressed their condolences.
