= Louis Agyemang =

Ghanaian footballer

Personal information
- Date of birth: 4 April 1983 (age 43)
- Place of birth: Accra, Ghana
- Height: 1.84 m (6 ft 0 in)
- Position: Striker

Senior career*
Years	Team	Apps	(Gls)
2002–2005	Hearts of Oak		
2005–2007	Kaizer Chiefs	35	(4)
2007–2008	Étoile du Sahel		
2007–2008	→ Dynamos (loan)		
2008–2010	Asante Kotoko		
2011–2012	Medeama S.C.		
2012–2015	Ashanti Gold		

International career
2005–2006	Ghana	2	(0)
- * Club domestic league appearances and goals

Louis Agyemang (born 4 April 1983) is a Ghanaian former professional footballer who played as a striker. He is one of the few to have played for Asante Kotoko S.C. and arch rivals Accra Hearts of Oak S.C. subsequently playing for Étoile Sportive du Sahel, Kaizer Chiefs F.C.

== Club career ==
Agyemang was born in Accra.

His previous club was when he was on loan at Dynamos in the South African National First Division, on 5 December 2008 he returned to Asante Kotoko. After two years with Asante Kotoko signed on 20 December 2010 with Medeama S.C.

== International career ==
Agyemang was part of the Ghana national team at the 2006 African Nations Cup in Egypt.
