= Mehmet Tayfun Türkmen =

Turkish football manager (born 1962)

Personal information
- Date of birth: 23 April 1962 (age 64)
- Place of birth: Turkey

Managerial career
- Years: Team
- 1992-1993: PSI Yurdumspor Köln
- Sidespor
- Afyonkarahisarspor
- Eskişehir Şekerspor
- 1999/2000: Marmarisspor
- 2002/2003: Hacettepe S.K.
- 2004/2005: FK Gänclärbirliyi Sumqayit
- 2004/2005: Zonguldak Kömürspor
- 2005/2006: Sidespor
- 2005/2006: Afyonkarahisarspor
- 2007/2008: Legon Cities FC
- 2008/2009: Aksarayspor
- 2010: Heart of Lions F.C.
- 2010/2011: Dedebit F.C.
- 2010/2011: Hacettepe S.K.
- 2018/2019: Heartland F.C.

Mehmet Tayfun Türkmen (born 23 April 1962, in Turkey) is a Turkish football manager.
