= Moses Armah =

Ghanaian football administrator

Moses Armah 'Parker' is a Ghanaian businessman, football administrator and currently the owner and President of Medeama SC as well as the chairman of Mospacka Group of companies which includes Medeama FM.

In July 2010, the businessman completed the takeover of Kessben FC for a reported fee of US$600,000 and renamed it Medeama SC.

During the 2019 Ghana Football Association general elections Moses Armah represented Medeama SC a delegated and cast the vote on behalf of the club.

Several Ghanaian media outlets reported that he was involved in a feud with former AC Milan midfielder Sulley Ali Muntari during Ghana's 2014 FIFA World Cup campaign in Brazil. Meanwhile, during a 2016 interview with Ghanaian radio station Happy FM Moses Armah said he has forgiven Muntari for the incident. Muntari was sent home early from the Ghana camp along with Kevin-Prince Boateng due to the incident. Former Ghana head coach James Kwesi Appiah revealed details about the incident in his book dubbed Leaders Don't have to Yell.

After acquiring Medeama in 2010 Moses Armah has steadily risen the profile of the club as they have represented Ghana twice in Confederation of African Football inter-club competitions by playing in the CAF Confederation Cup in 2014 and 2016.

He also founded Wassaman FC which was in July 2013 renamed to Emmanuel Stars FC and was bought by Nigerian pastor TB Joshua.

== Honours ==
In November 2018 Moses Armah was honoured in Canada for his contribution to football development in West Africa.

He led Medeama SC to beat giants Asante Kotoko to win the Ghanaian FA Cup in 2015. This follows a similar feat achieved against the same Kotoko side two years earlier.
