= Abrankese Stadium =

Sports venue in Kumasi, Ghana

Coordinates: 6.704°N 1.645734°W

- Interactive map of Abrankese Stadium
- Location: Kumasi, Ashanti, Ghana
- Capacity: 12,000

Construction
- Opened: 2007

Tenants
- Medeama SC; Ghana national football team

Anane Boateng Sports Stadium is a multi-use stadium in Kumasi, built by Mr Kwabena Kess the C.E.O of Kessben Group of Companies Ghana at Abrankese near Kuntenase in the Bosomtwe District of Ashanti Region. It is used mostly for football matches and serve as a gathering grounds for thousands of people, mostly members of the Moments of Glory Prayer Army (MOGPA). The stadium is the home stadium of Medeama SC of the Ghana Premier League. The stadium holds 12,000 spectators and opened in 2007.
