= Gilbert Fiamenyo =

Ghanaian footballer

Personal information
- Full name: Gilbert Fiamenyo
- Date of birth: July 6, 1992 (age 34)
- Place of birth: Accra, Ghana
- Position: Forward

Team information
- Current team: Heart of Oak

Youth career
- Feyenoord Academy

Senior career*
Years	Team	Apps	(Gls)
2009–2012	Heart of Lions	40	(20)
2012–	Hearts of Oak		

International career
2010	Ghana	7	(1)
- * Club domestic league appearances and goals

Gilbert Fiamenyo is a Ghanaian football player.
