= Real Sportive =

- Full name: Real Sportive
- Founded: 1997
- Dissolved: 2009
- Ground: Tema Sports Stadium; Tema, Greater Accra, Ghana
- Capacity: 10,000
- Chairman: Alhaji Y.A. Ibrahim
- Manager: Peter Voullmann
- League: Division Two League
Home colours

Real Sportive was a Ghanaian professional football club based in Tema, Greater Accra.

== History ==
They are a member of the Division Two League formerly of Poly Tank Division One League. Their home stadium is Tema Sports Stadium, formerly played in El Wak Stadium.

Real Sportive were promoted to the Ghana Premier League in 2004 and in their inaugural season ended Hearts of Oak's 46-game unbeaten streak. They followed up their record-breaking streak in 2005 robbing Asante Kotoko of an unbeaten streak.

South African Momo Medic was appointed their coach in 2007.

Sportive were relegated from the Premier League in 2008 after being deducted points for fielding an ineligible player before the last round of matches. Sportive played the 2009 season in Division One Zone 3B following their relegation but sold their Division One spot to Emirates FC after the season ended.
