= Amidaus Professionals F.C. =

Amidaus Professionals FC
- Full name: Amidaus Professionals Football Club
- Nickname(s): The Blues
- Ground: Tema Sports Stadium
- Capacity: 5,000
- Manager: Baba Ali
- League: Glo Premier League
- 2013–14: Glo Premier League, 16th
Home colours	Away colours

Amidaus Professionals Football Club is a football club from Ghana based in Tema, Greater Accra Region. The club are competing in the Glo Premier League. It qualified to partake in their maiden premiership campaign during the 2012-2013 Glo Premier League and was coached by Tony Lokko. After the campaign, Lokko announced his departure from the club. In July 2013, the club announced that it was going to appoint Fetteh Feyenoord trainer Baba Ali as their new coach.
