= Frederick Boateng =

Ghanaian footballer

Personal information
- Full name: Frederick Boateng
- Date of birth: 13 October 1993 (age 33)
- Place of birth: Accra, Ghana
- Height: 1.79 m (5 ft 10 in)
- Position: Centre forward

Team information
- Current team: Clube Desportivo da Huila
- Number: 10

Senior career*
Years	Team	Apps	(Gls)
2014	→ Ebusua Dwarfs	22	(8)
2016–2018	→ International Allies F.C.	24	(8)
2018	Asante Kotoko	21	(4)
2019	Clube Desportivo da Huila	10	(4)
- * Club domestic league appearances and goals

Frederick Boateng (born December 10, 1993) is a Ghanaian football player who plays as a striker for Clube Desportivo da Huíla.

== Club career ==
In January 2018 Ghana Premier League team Asante Kotoko confirmed signing the striker from fellow Ghanaian Premier League side Inter Allies. In December 2018 former Kotoko coach Charles Akonnor expressed backing for Boateng who had come under pressure from the club's fans. However, in April 2019 he ended his spell with the Kumasi-based side after both sides agreed to part ways. In 2019 summer Boateng was linked with a move to Guinean side AS Kaloum Star but the deal fell through. In January 2019 he was linked with a move to Egyptian Second Division side Petrojet SC. Boateng signed for Clube Desportivo da Huila in summer of 2019.
