= Tudu Mighty Jets F.C. =

Ghanaian association football club in Accra

Tudu Mighty Jets Football Club
- Full name: Tudu Mighty Jets Accra
- Nickname: Mighty Jets
- Founded: 1994
- Ground: Teshie Mats Park
- League: Division One League
- 2011–12: Glo Premier League, 16th (Relegated)

Tudu Mighty Jets are a Ghanaian professional football club, based in Accra, Greater Accra. They are competing in the 2012–13 Poly Tank Division One League after being relegated at the end of the 2011–12 Glo Premier League season.

== History ==
On 11 May 2010, the club won the play-offs against Nania F.C. in the Poly Tank Division One League Zone III play-offs and climbed into the 2010–11 season of the Glo Premier League.
