= BA Stars F.C. =

Brong Ahafo United Football Club
- Full name: Brong Ahafo United Football Club Sunyani
- Nickname: BA United
- Founded: 4 April 1960 as B.A. United
- Ground: Sunyani Coronation Park
- Capacity: 7,000
- Chairman: Micheal Agyeman
- League: One Touch Premier League
- 2008–10: 1st Poly Tank Division One League Zone II

Brong Ahafo United is a Ghanaian football Club, based in Sunyani, currently competing in the Ghana Premier League. It was established in 1960 to bring the people of Bono or Brong and Ahafo together through football. The club is also known as Apostles of power soccer. Their long time regional rival is Bofoakwa Tano, a club based in Sunyani as well. Other known clubs in the region are Aduana Stars(two time GPL champions), Berekum Chelsea, Young Apostles(BA United seed), DC United, Nsoatreman, Wamnafo might Royals, and few other clubs not mentioned.

Club Legends: Godfred Yeboah

The club competed in the erstwhile Ghana Division One League in zone one 2020-2021 and finished 8th with 37 points.

== History ==
The club was founded on 4 April 1960 as Brong Ahafo United.

== Current squad ==
Note: Flags indicate national team as defined under FIFA eligibility rules; some limited exceptions apply. Players may hold more than one non-FIFA nationality.

No.	Pos.	Nation	Player
1	GK	GHA	Nurudeen Mohammed
2	DF	GHA	Fuseini Adams
3	DF	GHA	Kwame Osei
4	DF	GHA	Daniel Ocran
6	MF	GHA	Samuel Adams
7	MF	GHA	Mamudu Suleman
9	FW	GHA	Daniel Bomfah
10	MF	GHA	Daniel Larbi Coomson
11	FW	GHA	Seidu Dauda

No.	Pos.	Nation	Player
13	DF	GHA	Abubakari Sadiq
14	MF	GHA	Mahmud Oshee
15	DF	GHA	Amos Akwasi Frimpong
16	FW	GHA	Joseph Halm
17	MF	GHA	Amos Frimpong
18	FW	GHA	Ishmael Otoo Amoah
20	FW	GHA	Kwasi Samuel Poku
22	GK	GHA	Ernest Adu
