= Coronation Park (Sunyani) =

Stadium in Sunyani, Ghana

Coordinates: 7°20′00″N 2°19′30″W

Coronation Park is a multi-use stadium in Sunyani, Ghana, capable of holding 5,000 people, that is used mostly for football matches.

== About ==
Coronation Park began development on eight acres of ground to honour the 1939 Coronation of George VI. It was intended for athletic activities, and was used for those as well as public/political gatherings and festivities. These have continued to be held to the modern day.

Currently, Coronation Park is a football stadium with a maximum capacity of 5,000. When Ghana hosted the 2008 Africa Cup of Nations, the park was renovated, but was however not used as part of the competition venue. The refurbishment incorporated chairs brought from the Accra Sports Stadium, the national stadium of the country. It was home ground for Division One League clubs Brong Ahafo United, Bofoakwa Tano, Ghana Premier League side Young Apostles and Ghana Women's Premier League team Prisons Ladies, as well as other lower grade ones. It had previously been home ground for Bechem Chelsea (now Berekum Chelsea) until 2010 when they relocated to Golden City Park.

During the COVID-19 pandemic, sales of crops were temporarily moved from Sunyani's central market to Coronation Park. In 2023, a member of parliament for the park and its surrounding areas, Kwasi Ameyaw-Cheremeh, revealed that some Chinese contractors who were brought on board to attempt a renovation of the stadium died during the pandemic. The park was not approved for use in the 2023–24 Ghana Premier League season amidst fan-lead attempts at renovations, with one such of those being on 28 June 2023. Additionally, its seating and roofing have been heavily damaged in a rainstorm on 4 March 2024.
