= Cape Coast Sports Stadium =

Sports venue in Cape Coast, Ghana

- Interactive map of Cape Coast Sports Stadium
- Location: Cape Coast, Central Region, Ghana
- Coordinates: 5°8′9″N 1°16′57″W
- Capacity: 15,000

Construction
- Opened: 3 May 2016
- Architect: Zhou Jun
- Project manager: China IPPR International Engineering Corporation

Tenants
- Ebusua Dwarfs; Lady Strikers; Ghana

Cape Coast Sports Stadium is a multi-use stadium in Cape Coast, Central Region, Ghana. It is used mostly for football matches and is the home stadium of Ebusua Dwarfs. The stadium holds 15,000 people.

== Stadium etymology ==
=== Construction ===
Cape Coast Sports Stadium; It was designed by the China IPPR International Engineering Corporation led by architect Zhou Jun.

== Stadium features ==
The stadium features a 300 car parking capacity, two basketball fields, a handball court and tennis court, and an indoor facility that can be used for any indoor games.

=== Stadium complex ===
The stadium complex has a 22-room hostel facility, a canteen, kitchen, fire-fighting room, storage rooms among others. It was designed by the China IPPR International Engineering Corporation led by architect Zhou Jun.

== See also ==
- List of football stadiums in Ghana
- Lists of stadiums

== External links and sources ==
- Photos at cafe.daum.net/stade
- MoU signed with Chinese Government for Cape Coast Stadium
- IPPR Winning Bidder for Cape Coast Stadium Project – Sinomach
