= Emmanuel Stars F.C. =

Emmanuel Stars
- Full name: Emmanuel Stars Football Club
- Founded: 2008
- Ground: TNA Park
- Capacity: 10,000
- President: TB Joshua
- Chief Executive Officer: Edmund Baidoo
- Chief-Trainer: Abubakar Yusif
- League: Poly Tank Division One League
- 2011–2012: Glo Premier League, 14th (Relegated)

Emmanuel Stars is a Ghanaian professional football club, based in Tarkwa, Western Region. They are competing in the 2012–13 Poly Tank Division One League after being relegated at the end of the 2011–12 Glo Premier League season.

Although the club was only founded in 2008, it has undergone two name changes. The club has previously been known as FC Medeama and Wassaman United.

== Club history ==
Former club logo

Wassaman United was founded in 2008 as FC Medeamaa and was renamed in 2010 when the then owner Moses Armah bought the first division club Kessben FC. Wassaman United plays its home games at the TNA Park from September 2011 and for the 2011–12 season of the Glo Premier League.

In July 2013, the club was renamed to Emmanuel Stars and was bought by Nigerian pastor TB Joshua.

== Technical team ==
Chief-Trainer

- Abubakar Yusif

Co-Trainer

- Ben Zola

CEO

- Kingsley Edmund Baidoo

== Titles ==
as FC Medeamaa

- 2008: 12th Central Region Second Division
- 2009: Middle League
- 2010: Poly Tank Division One League (Master Group 2B)

== Managers ==
- 2008–2010:Abdul-Karim Zito
- 2010–2011: Paa Kwesi Fabin
- 2011: Herbert Addo
- 2011–present: Abubakar Yusif
