= Berekum Arsenal F.C. =

Berekum Arsenal FC
- Full name: Berekum Arsenal Football Club
- Nickname: Agye Se Tuo!
- Founded: 1995; 31 years ago
- Ground: Golden City Park, Berekum, Ghana
- Capacity: 5,000
- Chairman: Zaky Rumah Cijahe
- Manager: Panagur Mewek
- League: Division One League
- Website: berekumarsenalfc.com
Home colours	Away colours

Berekum Arsenal Football Club is a Ghanaian football club based in Berekum in the Bono region of Ghana, about 30 minutes drive west from Sunyani. Founded in 1995, They are currently members of the Division One League.

== CAF Cup ==
In 2006, the club qualified for the CAF Confederation Cup but they were eliminated when they met Petro Atletico in the second round. They previously eliminated Diables Noirs in the first round of the tournament.

== Ban ==
The club was banned from the MTN FA Cup by the GFA Disciplinary Committee. The club was banned with other 3 clubs after they failed to honor their MTN FA Cup Preliminary round of matches without seeking permit from the GFA and withdrawal alert to the FA.

== Relegation ==
The club was relegated to the Division One League in 2013. They were relegated after they placed 14th on the league table. Ever since they were relegated, they were claimed to be struggling to get back to the elite division.

== 2019-20 players ==
Note: Flags indicate national team as defined under FIFA eligibility rules; some limited exceptions apply. Players may hold more than one non-FIFA nationality.

No.	Pos.	Nation	Player
30	GK	GHA	Emmanuel Adu
23	DF	GHA	Amos Isaac Baah
33	DF	GHA	Angelo Sowah
—	DF	GHA	Emmanuel Adomako
14	DF	GHA	Eric Asante
27	DF	GHA	Kwadwo Asiedu (Right Back)
6	DF	GHA	Nicholas Boateng
5	DF	GHA	Prince Oteng Twum
35	DF	GHA	Yussif Rahman
32	MF	GHA	Amos Yeboah
4	MF	GHA	Daniel Frimpong
28	MF	GHA	Eric Obeng (Attacking)
8	MF	GHA	Kofi Boakye
19	MF	GHA	Naafew Gariba
—	MF	GHA	Owusu Yeboah Collins (Defensive)

No.	Pos.	Nation	Player
13	MF	GHA	Andrew Annan (Winger)
—	MF	GHA	Augustine Kwabena (Winger)
—	MF	GHA	Eric Henneh (Winger)
3	MF	GHA	Kofi Agyapong (Wing Back)
36	MF	GHA	Richard Biadoo (Winger)
9	FW	GHA	Adam AbuBakar
20	FW	GHA	Ebenezer Aboagye
11	FW	GHA	Gyimah Moro
—	FW	GHA	Kwadwo Obrempong
—	FW	GHA	Mohammed Adamuh
10	FW	GHA	Patrick Kofi Ansu

== Performance in CAF competitions ==
- CAF Confederation Cup: 1 appearance

2006 – Second Round
