= Kpando Stadium =

Sports venue in Kpandu, Ghana

Coordinates: 6.99440°N 0.29926°E

Kpando Stadium is a multi-use stadium in Kpandu, in the Volta Region of Ghana. It is used mostly for football matches and is the home stadium of Heart of Lions of the Ghana Premier League. The stadium holds 5,000 spectators.
