= Carl Reindorf Park Stadium =

Stadium in Dansoman, Ghana

Coordinates: 5.557904°N 0.272100°W

Carl Reindorf Park Stadium, also called Dansoman Park Stadium, is a multi-use stadium in Dansoman, a suburb of Accra in Ghana.

== History ==
It used mostly for football matches and is the home stadium of Liberty Professionals FC. The stadium holds 2,000 people. The stadium is called Carl Reindorf Stadium, named in honour of the Ghanaian historian Carl Christian Reindorf.

Faith Ladies, a club in the Ghana Women's Premier League plays their home matches at the Carl Reindorf Park Stadium.
