= TNA Park =

Sports stadium

TnA Stadium
- Location in Ghana
- Full name: Tarkwa & Abosso Stadium
- Location: Tarkwa, Tarkwa-Nsuaem Municipal District, Ghana
- Coordinates: 5.3010°N 1.9924°W
- Owner: ?
- Operator: Medeama SC
- Capacity: 10,000

Construction
- Built: ?
- Opened: ?
- Renovated: 2010
- Expanded: 2010
- Cost: ?
- Architect: ?

Tenant
- Medeama SC

The TnA Stadium, officially named Tarkwa & Abosso Stadium, is a multi-use stadium in Tarkwa, Ghana. It is currently used mostly for football matches and is the home ground of Ghana Premier League team Medeama SC. The stadium currently holds 10,000 people. With the promotion of Emmanuel Stars FC to the Ghana Premier League at the end of the 2010–2011 season, the stadium became their home ground.
