= Len Clay Stadium =

Sports Stadium

Coordinates: 6°12′31″N 1°40′38″W

- Interactive map of Len Clay Stadium
- Full name: Len Clay Stadium
- Location: Obuasi, Ashanti, Ghana
- Capacity: 20,000

Construction
- Opened: 10 May 1990
- Renovated: 17 April 2005
- Architect: Enninful Design Services
- Project manager: Charles Blankson-Hemans
- Structural engineer: CESY
- Services engineer: Dzokoto
- General contractor: A.LANG
- Main contractor: A.Lang

Tenants
- Ashanti Gold Sporting Club; Ghana national football team

Len Clay Stadium is a multi-use stadium in Obuasi, Ghana. It was opened on 10 May 1990 and renovated on 17 April 2005 and is home to Ashanti Gold Sporting Club. It has capacity for 20,000 people.

== History ==
Len Clay Stadium was opened on 10 May 1990 by the former president of Ghana, Jerry Rawlings. The stadium is dedicated to Len Clay, a former Group Engineering and Projects Manager of Ashanti Goldfield Company and supporter of the team.

The stadium was designed by Enninful Design Services and built by A.Lang with Arc Charles Blankson-Hemans as the project manager for EDS., who also built the Enyinam Housing Project and Enyinam lodge amongst others and different projects across Ghana.

== Stadium features ==
The stadium features automatic turnstiles, car park and over 1,300 seats in the main Grandstand, as well as six Executive Boxes, each with its own air-conditioning and room for 40 seats.

=== Stadium complex ===
The Stadium complex includes an athletic track, P.A. system, video cameras, V.I.P. car park, toilets and a bar with a function room. A multi-gym and electronic scoreboard, as well as floodlighting.

== See also ==
- List of football stadiums in Ghana
- Lists of stadiums
