= Tema Sports Stadium =

Sports venue in Tema, Ghana

Robert Mensah Sports Stadium
- Tema Park
- Location: Tema, Ghana
- Capacity: 5,000

Construction
- Opened: 2008

Tenants
- Tema Youth and Real Sportive

Robert Mensah Sports Stadium is a multi-use stadium in Tema, Ghana. It is used mostly for football matches and is the home stadium of Tema Youth and Real Sportive. The stadium holds 5,000 people. It was an artificial pitch used for training during the 2008 Africa Cup of Nations.

As of 2023, it was used as a home ground for five Division One League clubs (Attram de Visser, Golden Kicks, Na God, Tema Youth, and Tudu Mighty Jets) and about five lower-tier clubs.
