= New Edubiase United F.C. =

Ghanaian football club

New Edubiase United FC
- Full name: New Edubiase United Football Club
- Founded: Unknown
- Ground: Len Clay Stadium
- Capacity: 30,000
- Chairman: (Ghana) Nana Asiamah Oguashie II
- League: One Touch Premier League
- 2013–14: 10th

New Edubiase United Football Club are a Ghanaian professional association football club, based in New Edubiase and currently a member of the Ghana Premier League.
