= Wa Sports Stadium =

Sports venue in Wa, Ghana

- Wa Park
- Location: Wa, Ghana
- Capacity: 5,000

Construction
- Opened: 2006

Tenant
- Wa All Stars F.C.

Wa Sports Stadium is a multi-use stadium in Wa, Ghana. It used mostly for football matches and is the home stadium of All Stars F.C. of the Ghana Premier League. The stadium holds 5,000 spectators.
