= Tema Youth F.C. =

Tema Youth SC
- Full name: Tema Youth Sporting Club
- Nickname: Harbour Warriors
- Founded: 2005; 21 years ago
- Ground: Tema Sports Stadium; Tema, Greater Accra, Ghana
- Capacity: 5,000
- Chairman: James Lamina
- Manager: Nebosia Kapor
- League: Division One
- 2018: PolyTank Division One League Zone 3B, 1st
Home colours	Away colours

Tema Youth Football Club is a Ghanaian professional football club based in Tema, Greater Accra. The club competed in the 2017 Ghanaian Premier League, but got relegated at the end of the season.

== History ==
Founded in 2005, TYSC are members of the Glo Premier League. Their home stadium is Tema Sports Stadium.

== Performance in CAF competitions ==
- CAF Confederation Cup: 1 appearance

2007 - disqualified in First Round

== Managers ==
- (Ghana) Anthony Lokko (2005–06)
- (Ghana) John Eshun (2006–07)
- (Ghana) Bright Osei (2008)
- (Ghana) Joachim Yaw (2008)
- (Ghana) David Duncan (2009)
- (Ghana) Isaac "Opeele" Boateng (2009)
- (Austria) Attila Sekerlioglu (2009)
- (Ghana) Anthony Lokko (2009–2011)
- (Ghana) Prince Owusu (coach) (2011–12)
- (Ghana) Edward Odoom (2012–2014)
- (Serbia) Nebosia Kapor

== Notable players ==
- (Ghana) Joseph Paintsil (2016–17)
- (Ghana) Richard Annang (2009–10)
