= Baba Yara Stadium =

Multi-purpose stadium in Kumasi, Ghana

Coordinates: 6°40′57.65″N 1°36′18.40″W

Baba Yara Sports Stadium
- Kumasi Sports Stadium
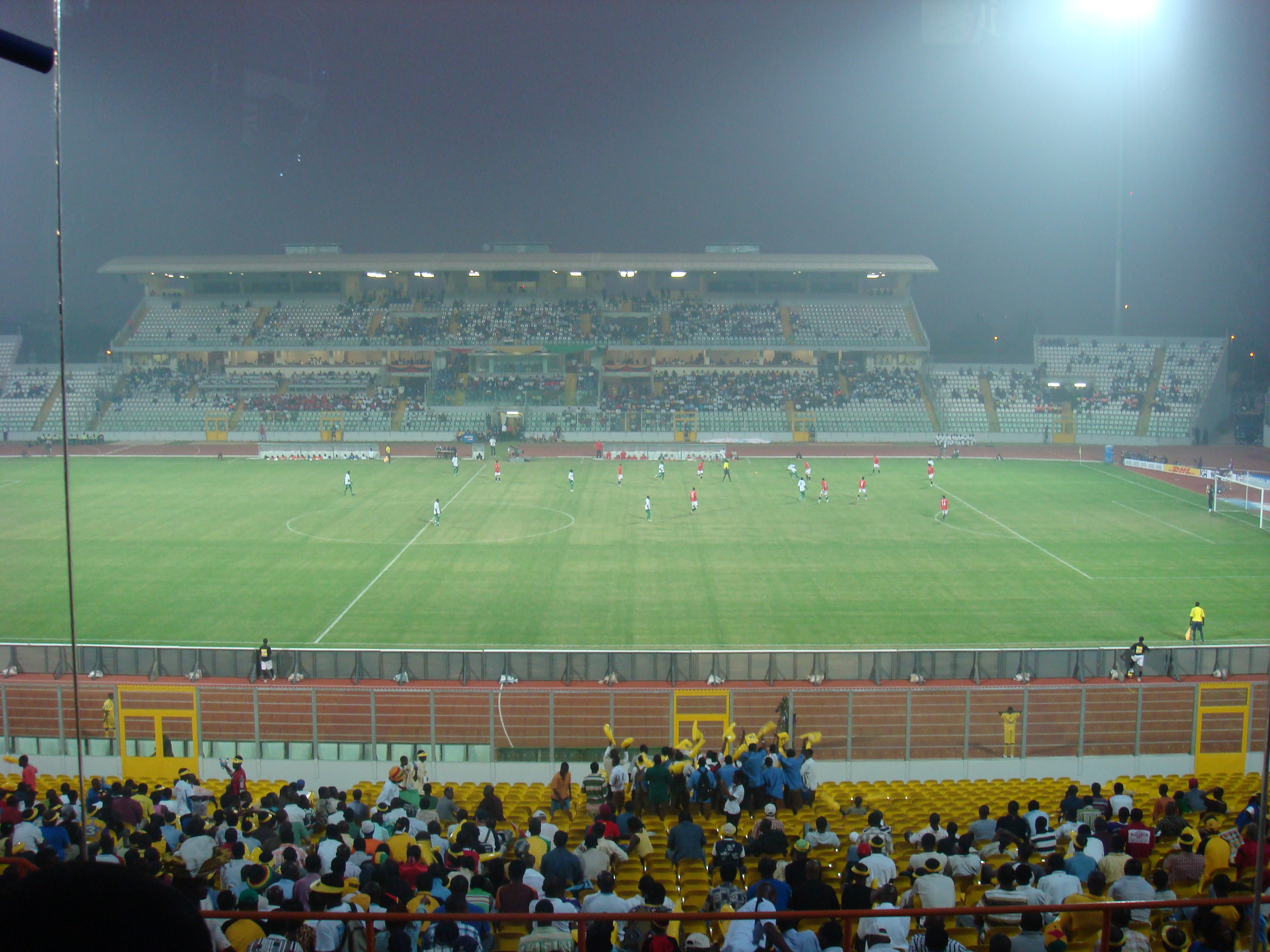
- Interactive map of Baba Yara Sports Stadium
- Former names: Kumasi Sports Stadium
- Location: Kumasi, Ashanti, Ghana
- Owner: Sports Council of Ashanti
- Capacity: 40,528
- Surface: Grass

Construction
- Opened: 1959 (first stands were built in 1971)
- Project manager: United African Company (UAC)

Tenants
- Asante Kotoko; Ghana national football team

Baba Yara Sports Stadium (also Kumasi Sports Stadium) is a multi-purpose stadium in Kumasi, Ashanti. It is Ghana's largest stadium, with a seating capacity of 40,528. The Kumasi Stadium is used mostly for football matches, although it is also used for athletics. It is the home of Kumasi Asante Kotoko as well as King Faisal.

The Stadium which is known for hosting important games such as World cup qualifiers and AFCON qualifiers received its heaviest backlash due to technical infraction and unsuitable playing field. This was due to a church program organized on the pitch thereby losing its license to host football matches of international standard s.

== History ==
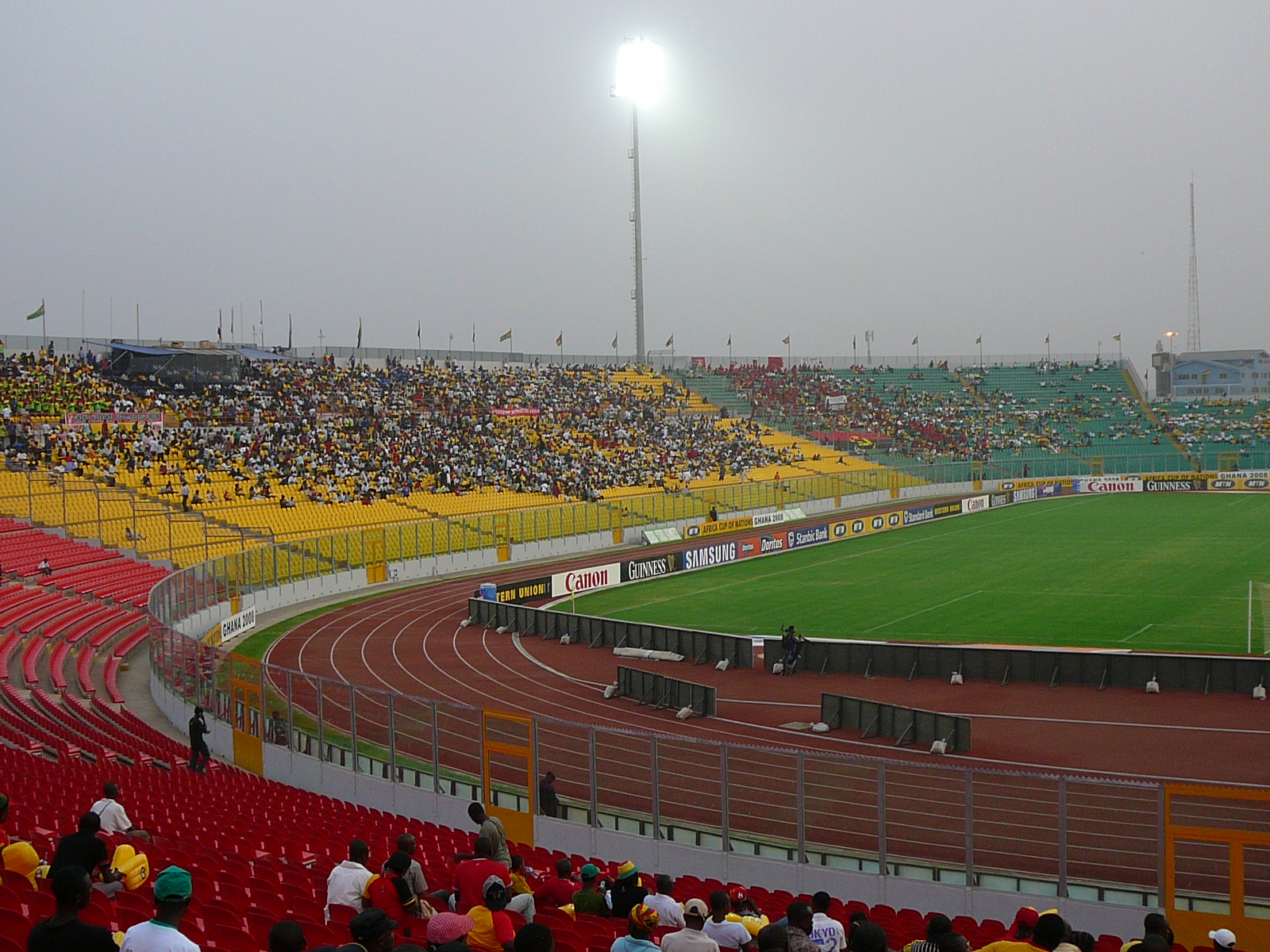
Kumasi Sports Stadium in the 26th Africa Cup of Nations

The stadium was originally built by the United African Company (UAC) in 1957 and inaugurated as a designated football pitch in 1959. The first stands were constructed in 1971. The stadium was rebuilt in 1977. It was renamed after Kumasi-born footballer Baba Yara (1936–1969, active for Asante Kotoko 1955–1961) under the New Patriotic government in 2004. The third major works ended in 2008. As part of the works, the west stand was demolished and replaced by a two-tier stand with press, corporate, and VIP facilities. The rest of the stands were upgraded, seats were added, and transparent panels were installed to separate the spectator area from the playing area in order to prevent pitch invasions.

== Tournaments ==
=== 1978, 2000 and 2008 African Cup of Nations ===
The stadium hosted 6 group matches and one of the semi-final matches of the 1978 African Cup of Nations tournament. During the 2000 African Cup of Nations, the stadium hosted 7 matches. It was later used for the 2008 African Cup of Nations. The Baba Yara stadium also hosted the Ghana and Nigeria match in the first leg of their World Cup playoff match on Friday March 25, 2022.
