= Legon Cities FC =

Association football club in Accra

Legon Cities
- Full name: Legon Cities Football Club
- Nickname: The Royals
- Founded: 2006; 19 years ago
- Ground: El Wak Stadium
- Capacity: 7,000
- Chairman: Richard K. Atikpo
- Manager: Yaw Acheampong
- League: Ghana Premier League

Legon Cities FC (formerly known as Wa All Stars FC) is a football club from Ghana currently based in Accra, Greater Accra. The club won the 2016 Ghanaian Premier League.

== History ==
The club was founded in January 2006 through investments by Kwesi Nyantakyi in Wa, Ghana. There had been a number of First Division Clubs in the region notably Freedom Stars, Veterans and Wa Africa United. They are a member of the Ghana Premier League. The club used to play their home games at Wa Sports Stadium formerly played in the Golden City Park in Berekum but now plays their home games at the Accra Sports Stadium.

In December 2019, the club was sold and renamed to Legon Cities F.C.

== Coaches ==
- Goran Barjaktarevic
- Bashir Hayford November 2020-

=== Former coaches ===
- (Turkey) Mehmet Tayfun Türkmen
- Samuel Paa Kwesi Fabian

== Honours ==
- Ghana Premier League
  - Champions (1): 2016
