= Berekum Chelsea F.C. =

Association football club in Berekum

Berekum Chelsea FC
- Full name: Berekum Chelsea Football Club
- Nickname: Blues
- Founded: 21 July 2004; 22 years ago
- Ground: Golden City Park; Berekum, Ghana
- Capacity: 10,000
- Owner: Obed Nana Nketiah
- Chairman: Obed Nana Nketiah
- Manager: Asare Bediako
- League: Ghana Premier League
- 2025–2026: 6th

Berekum United Football Club is a Ghanaian professional football club based in Berekum, Bono Region, previously known as Bechem Chelsea Football Club. They compete in the Ghana Premier League, the top-flight of the Ghanaian football system.

== History ==
The club was formed on 21 July 2004 in the then Brong Ahafo Region of Ghana. In 2008, four years after the inception of the club during that period playing and rising in the lower leagues, it was promoted to the Ghana premier league after winning their zone of the Division One League.

The board of directors heeded the advice by the Ghana Football Association to use the name Berekum Chelsea rather than the Bechem Chelsea. The club was later moved to Bechem and its name changed to Bechem Chelsea in conformity with its home base.

Coffie, the club's Communications Director, said that preparations were underway in developing a football park at Bechem to serve as the team's home ground.

The club's name and home kit are inspired by Chelsea. The club played at Ohene Djan Sports Stadium for their first Glo Premier League match on 24 November 2008 and won the match with a 3–2 victory against Liberty Professionals. The club started the 2010–11 Ghana Premier League season very strongly and then eventually went on to win the league.

On 12 April 2026, during a drive back from a Premier League fixture, club winger Dominic Frimpong was killed during an armed robbery of the team bus by masked men.

== Kit sponsor ==
The Ghanaian Premier League side, have struck a partnership deal with kit manufacturing firm, Puma AG.

== Honours ==
- Ghana Premier League
  - Champions: 2010–11

== Performance in CAF competitions ==
- CAF Champions League: 2 appearances

2012 – Group stage
2014 – First Round

- CAF Confederation Cup: 0 appearances
- CAF Super Cup: 0 appearances

== Current squad ==
=== First team ===
As of 3 February 2023.

Note: Flags indicate national team as defined under FIFA eligibility rules; some limited exceptions apply. Players may hold more than one non-FIFA nationality.

| No. | Pos. | Nation | Player |
|---|---|---|---|
| 1 | GK | GHA | Adu Emmanuel |
| 2 | MF | GHA | Collins Ameyaw |
| 4 | FW | GHA | Mezack Afriyie |
| 5 | DF | GHA | Ahmed Adams |
| 6 | DF | GHA | Fuseini Zackaria |
| 8 | DF | GHA | Kuffour Asamoah |
| 9 | FW | GHA | Emmanuel Sarpong |
| 10 | MF | GHA | Stephen Amankona |
| 11 | FW | GHA | Osei Owusu |
| 13 | MF | GHA | Flavien Kongoza |
| 14 | DF | GHA | Frank Oppong |
| 17 | MF | GHA | Emmanuel Essien |
| 18 | MF | GHA | Zacheaus Ndego |

| No. | Pos. | Nation | Player |
|---|---|---|---|
| 19 | DF | GHA | Prince Anane |
| 20 | MF | GHA | Clenn Afful |
| 22 | GK | GHA | Ernest Sowah |
| 23 | MF | GHA | Dramani Awuah |
| 24 | MF | GHA | Daniel Asoma |
| 25 | DF | GHA | Lord Amoah |
| 29 | MF | UGA | Denis Kaweesa |
| 30 | GK | GHA | Gregory Sekyere |
| 31 | DF | GHA | Patrick Asiedu |
| 35 | DF | GHA | Haruna Shaibu |
| 56 | DF | GHA | Yaw Dankwah |
| 59 | FW | GHA | Kusi Pandrous |

== Former players ==
- (Ghana) Isaac Ayipei
- (Ghana) Nicholas Opoku
- (Ghana) Dominic Frimpong

== Notable players ==
For all former players with a Wikipedia article see Category:Berekum Chelsea F.C. players

== Incidents ==
On 12th April 2026, Berekum Chelsea F.C players and officials were attacked by armed robbers while travelling by bus from Samreboi to Berekum. The attack occurred on the Ahyiresu-Kwame Dwumor Sreso road in the Nyinahin District of the Ashanti Region of Ghana.

The bus transporting about 30 players and officials was attacked by six armed men who opened fire on the vehicle. Dominic Frimpong, a player on the team died from gunshot wounds sustained in the attack.
