= Heart of Lions F.C. =

Heart of Lions FC Ltd
- Full name: Heart of Lions Football Club
- Nicknames: Giant Killers, Dzi Woa Nu
- Founded: 2001; 25 years ago
- Ground: Kpando Stadium; Kpandu, Volta, Ghana
- Capacity: 5,000
- Manager: Bashir Hayford
- League: Premier League
- 2025–26: 13th
Home colours	Away colours

Heart of Lions Football Club is a Ghanaian professional football club based in Kpando, Volta. The club participated in the Glo Premier League but was relegated in 2015.

The club is a two-time winner of the GHALCA top 4 competition in 2005 and 2009, respectively.

They are also the last club to win the Sports Writers Association Of Ghana (SWAG) Cup in 2009.

== History ==
Heart of Lions FC were promoted to the Ghanaian Premier League in 2002/2003 league season. The team currently plays in the Ghana Premier League and finished as runners-up to GoldStars in the 2024/25 league season. They have won the prestigious Top 4 competition on two occasions, first in 2005 and second in 2009.

== Former coaches ==
- (Turkey) Mehmet Tayfun Türkmen (2010)
- (Ghana) Paa Kwesi Fabin (2011-2012)

== Performance in CAF competitions ==
- CAF Confederation Cup: 1 appearance

2005 – withdrew in the first round

- CAF Champions League: 1 appearance

2009
