= Medeama S.C. =

Association football club in Tarkwa

Medeama SC
- Full name: Medeama Sporting Club
- Nicknames: Mauve and Yellow
- Founded: April 18, 2002; 24 years ago
- Ground: TNA Park; Tarkwa, Western Region, Ghana
- Capacity: 10,000
- Owner: Moses Armah
- Chairman: Anthony Aubynn
- Manager: Ibrahim Anyars Tanko
- League: Ghanaian Premier League
- 2025–26: 1st; champions
- Website: www.medeamasc.com

Medeama Sporting Club is a Ghanaian association football club based in Tarkwa, Western Region. It was formerly known as Kessben F.C. before changing its name to Medeama Sporting Club in January 2011.

== History ==
Medeama Football Club was established in 2008 and began playing in the Ghana Division Three League. In 2010, the club failed in its initial attempt to qualify for the Ghana Premier League. This led to the purchasing of the defunct Kessben FC the same year. The licensing of the club was fully completed in December 2010, and the club was renamed Medeama Sporting Club in January 2011. The base of the Kessben club was moved from Abrankese in the Ashanti Region of Ghana to Tarkwa in the Western Region of Ghana.

Medeama have won the Ghanaian FA Cup twice, in 2013 and 2015. The 2022-23 season saw Medeama claim their first Ghana Premier League title, winning a second in the 2025-26 campaign.

== Grounds ==
Medeama SC play their home matches at the T&A Stadium located in Tarkwa, Ghana. The stadium, commissioned in August 2024, has a seating capacity of just over 10,000.

== Roster ==
As of 10 October 2022.

Note: Flags indicate national team as defined under FIFA eligibility rules; some limited exceptions apply. Players may hold more than one non-FIFA nationality.

No.	Pos.	Nation	Player
2	DF	GHA	Nurudeen Abdulai
3	MF	GHA	Agyei Boakye
4	DF	GHA	Kwadwo Amoako
6	MF	GHA	Ernest Mwankurinah
8	MF	GHA	Manuel Mantey
10	FW	GHA	Derrick Fordjour
11	FW	GHA	Darlington Gyanfosu
12	GK	GHA	Appiah Kubi
13	MF	GHA	Donald Gbedemah
14	DF	GHA	Hamidu Abdul Fatawu
16	GK	GHA	Clyde Agyeman
18	FW	GHA	Theophilus Anoba

No.	Pos.	Nation	Player
19	DF	GHA	Baba Abdulai Musah
20	FW	GHA	Joseph Tetteh Zutah
21	DF	GHA	Vincent Atingah
22	GK	GHA	Kamil Anaba
24	DF	GHA	Kofi Asmah
25	FW	GHA	Joshua Agyemang
27	MF	GHA	Kwasi Donsu
29	MF	GHA	Kwasi Donsu
30	DF	GHA	Ibrahim Yaro
38	GK	GHA	Felix Kyei
40	MF	GHA	Charles Agyemang
41	FW	GHA	Jonathan Sowah

=== Captains ===
- Mohammed Muntari Tagoe 2014–2016
- Joseph Tetteh Zutah 2017–

=== Management staff ===
Chairman

- (Ghana) Moses Armah

Board Chairman

- (Ghana) Dr Anthony Aubynn

Chief executive

- (Ghana) James Essilfie

Club Solicitor

- (Ghana) Emmanuel Larbi Amoah

Communication Director

- (Ghana) Patrick Akoto

==== Managerial history ====
- (Netherlands) Hans van der Pluijm (Head coach) 2013–2015
- (South Africa) Tom Strand (Head coach) 2015–2016
- (Ghana) Evans Adotey (Technical Director), (Interim coach) 2013–2017
- (Ghana) Samuel Boadu (Head coach) (2018–2021)
- (Ghana) Yaw Preko (Head coach) (2021)
- (Ghana) Ignatius Osei-Fosu (Head coach)
- (Ghana) Charles Anokye Frimpong (Assistant coach)

=== Supporting staff ===
- (Ghana) Hamza Obeng (Assistant coach)
- (Ghana) Eric Amponsah (Goalkeepers coach)
- (Ghana) Joachim Yaw (Assistant coach)

== Honours ==
- Ghana Premier League: 2022–23, 2025–26
- Ghana FA Cup: 2013, 2015
- Ghana Super Cup: 2015, 2023, 2026.
