= Ghana Premier League Top Scorer =

== Top scorers by season ==
1973–2026 Ghana Premier League Top Scorers
Season	Best scorers	Team	Goals	Ref
1973	(Ghana) Peter Lamptey	Hearts of Oak	26	
1974	(Ghana) Dan Owusu	Bofoakwa Tano	24	
1975	(Ghana) Dan Owusu	Bofoakwa Tano	26	
1976	(Ghana) Dan Owusu	Bofoakwa Tano	28	
1977	(Ghana) George Alhassan	Great Olympics	—N/a	
1978	(Ghana) Muhammed Choo	Real Tamale United	22	
1979	(Ghana) Opoku Afriyie	Asante Kotoko	28	
1980	(Ghana) Emmanuel Quarshie	Sekondi Hasaacas	18	
1981	(Ghana) Opoku Afriyie	Asante Kotoko	21	
1982	(Ghana) Muhammed Choo	Real Tamale United	15	
1983	(Ghana) Anane Kobo	Real Tamale United	—N/a	
1984	(Ghana) Anane Kobo	Real Tamale United	—N/a	
1985	(Ghana) George Alhassan	Great Olympics	—N/a	
1986	(Ghana) Tony Yeboah	Cornerstones	40+	
1987	(Ghana) Tony Yeboah	Cornerstones	35	
1988–89	(Ghana) Henry Acquah	Hearts of Oak	—N/a	
1989–90	(Ghana) Muhammed Tijani	Cornerstones	15	
1990–91	(Ghana) Thomas Boakye	Asante Kotoko	—N/a	
1991–92	(Ghana) Abdul Mumuni	Dawu Youngstars	—N/a	
1992–93	(Ghana) Augustine Ahinful	Goldfields	12	
1993–94	(Ghana) Oscar Laud	Dawu Youngstars	—N/a	
1994–95	(Ghana) Charles Amoah	Okwawu United	9	
1995–96	(Ghana) Kofi Deblah	Goldfields	—N/a	(Note: Kofi Deblah scored a combined 49 league goals as the 1995–96 and 1996–97 Ghana Premier League Top Scorer.)
1996–97	(Ghana) Kofi Deblah	Goldfields	—N/a	
1997–98	(Ghana) Joe Fameyeh	Hearts of Oak	—N/a	
1999	(Ghana) Ishmael Addo	Hearts of Oak	19	
2000	(Ghana) Ishmael Addo	Hearts of Oak	21	
2001	(Ghana) Ishmael Addo	Hearts of Oak	22	
2002	(Ghana) Bernard Dong Bortey (Ghana) Charles Asampong Taylor	Hearts of Oak	18	
2003	(Ghana) Shaibu Yakubu	Goldfields Obuasi	13	
2004–05	(Ghana) Samuel Yeboah	Heart of Lions	18	
2005	(Ghana) Prince Tagoe	Hearts of Oak	18	
2006–07	(Ghana) Emmanuel Clottey	Great Olympics	14	
2007–08	(Ghana) Eric Bekoe	Asante Kotoko	17	
2008–09	(Ghana) Alex Asamoah	Asante Kotoko	16	
2009–10	(Ghana) Bismark Idan (Ghana) Samuel Afum	Kessben Hearts of Oak	13	
2010–11	(Ghana) Nana Poku	Berekum Arsenal	17	
2011–12	(Ghana) Emmanuel Baffour	New Edubiase United	21	
2012–13	(Ghana) Mahatma Otoo	Hearts of Oak	20	
2013–14	(Ghana) Augustine Okrah	Bechem	16	
2015	(Ghana) Kofi Owusu	Berekum Chelsea	19	
2016	(Ghana) Latif Blessing	Liberty Professionals	14	
2017	(Ghana) Hans Kwofie	Ashanti Gold	17	
2020–21	(Ghana) Diawisie Taylor	Karela United	18	
2021–22	(Ghana) Yaw Annor	Ashanti Gold	24	
2022–23	(Ghana) Abednego Tetteh	King Faisal	18	
2023–24	(Ghana) Stephen Amankona	Berekum Chelsea	19	
2024–25	(Ghana) Stephen Amankona	Berekum Chelsea	15	
2025–26	(Ghana) Samuel Attah Kumi	Bibiani Gold Stars	19	
