= Godwin Sefah =

Ghanaian footballer (born 2009)

Personal information
- Date of birth: 8 August 2009 (age 17)
- Place of birth: Bonwire, Ghana
- Position: Midfielder

Team information
- Current team: Samartex
- Number: 12

Youth career
- City Academy

Senior career*
Years	Team	Apps	(Gls)
2024–	Samartex	21	(2)
- * Club domestic league appearances and goals as of 17:44, 24 May 2025 (UTC)

Godwin Sefah (born 8 August 2009) is a Ghanaian footballer who currently plays as a midfielder for Ghana Premier League side Samartex.

== Early life ==
Born in Bonwire in the Ashanti Region of Ghana, both of Sefah's parents died when he was a child, and he was raised by his elder sister.

== Club career ==
Having started his career with Division Two League side City Academy, Sefah moved to Ghana Premier League club Samartex in August 2024. He made his senior debut on the opening day of the 2024–25 season, coming on as a late substitute for Solomon Agyei in Samartex' 0–0 draw with Dreams on 7 September. Following the game, Samartex head coach Nurudeen Amadu praised Sefah, stating that he was "a young chap and has a lot of potential in him".

In Samartex' next game, Sefah made his CAF Champions League bow in a 2–2 draw with Moroccan club Raja Casablanca, replacing Agyei again with ten minutes remaining in the match. He scored his first goal for the club the following month in Samartex' 1–1 draw with Karela United on 6 October 2024.

== Career statistics ==
=== Club ===
As of 24 May 2025.

Appearances and goals by club, season and competition
Club	Season	League			Cup		Continental		Other		Total	
Club	Season	Division	Apps	Goals	Apps	Goals	Apps	Goals	Apps	Goals	Apps	Goals
Samartex	2024–25	Ghana Premier League	21	2	0	0	1 (Note: Appearances in the CAF Champions League)	0	1 (Note: Appearances in the Ghana Super Cup)	0	23	2
Career total			21	2	0	0	1	0	1	0	23	2
