= William Amamoo =

Ghanaian footballer

Personal information
- Full name: William Amamoo
- Date of birth: 4 April 1985 (age 41)
- Place of birth: Accra, Ghana
- Height: 1.95 m (6 ft 5 in)
- Position: Goalkeeper

Team information
- Current team: Härnösands FF

Senior career*
Years	Team	Apps	(Gls)
2000	Liberty Professionals F.C.		
2001	Dawu Youngstars	23	(0)
2002	Heart of Lions	7	(0)
2003–2004	FC Farul Constanţa	1	(0)
2005–2006	Syrianska Södertälje	23	(0)
2006–2007	FC Sopron	2	(0)
2008–2009	Vasalunds IF		
2008	→ FC Telecom Egypt (loan)	8	(0)
2010–2011	Hapoel Petah Tikva	3	(0)
2011	Enköpings SK		
2011	Floriana	2	(0)
2012–2013	Degerfors	0	(0)
2013–2016	Härnösand		
2016	Ängelholm	0	(0)
2016–	Härnösands FF	0	(0)

International career
2008–2010	Ghana	3	(0)
- * Club domestic league appearances and goals as of 16 August 2016

William Amamoo (born 4 April 1985 in Accra) is a Ghanaian footballer who plays for Härnösands FF in Sweden.

== Career ==
Amamoo began his career in 1998 with the famous Ghanaian club Liberty Professionals F.C. and qualified the team from Division One to the Premiership. He left to Dawu Youngsters in 2000, and later joined Ghana Premier League club Heart of Lions in 2002. In May 2003 he moved to Romanian Liga I team FC Farul Constanţa.

Amamoo played 25 games with Constanţa and moved to Swedish team Syrianska FC, Then he moved to FC Sopron He later moved in 2008 to Swedish team Vasalunds IF, after Sweden William moved to Egypt and signed a loan contract for FC Telecom Egypt. He then returned in 2009 to Vasalunds IF in Sweden after his loan. Amamoo joined and signed in 2010 a three-year contract deal with Hapoel Petah Tikva in Israel, but the contract was annulled in March 2011. He made only 3 appearances for the Israeli club.

In July 2011, Amamoo signed a one-year contract with Maltese side Floriana.

== International career ==
He received first cap for the Blacks Stars at the friendly match against Australia on 23 May 2008.

== Personal life ==
He requested the Romanian passport, the wish was to play for the Romania national football team, the claim was rejected in 2004. He married his Swedish fiancée, Susana in Accra recently and that can facilitate his quest for a Swedish passport.

== Background ==
The Black Stars goalkeeper, has pledged his continuous support for the family of Ibrahim Dossey, who died on 9 December 2008. The Egypt-based goalie had launched a campaign to raise funds to save Dossey's life until his death.

Amamoo has promised to fund the education of Dossey's daughter, who was unhurt in the serious car accident that resulted in his death.

“I have decided to cater for his daughter's education because if you know Ibrahim, you will know that he was close to her,” Amamoo told.

“I think so far as I live for long, I will do things that will make her happy in life. I also intend to invite her to Sweden for holidays and all that.

“You know about my foundation, I'm thinking of continuing in memory of him and my late father.”

Amamoo could not attend the burial because of his club commitments.
