= List of Ghana Premier League football transfers summer 2023 =

The following is a list of transfers that have been made during the 2023-24 Ghana Premier League season.

== Transfers ==
List of 2023 GPL transfers
Date	Name	Moving from	Moving to	Mode of Transfer
July 9, 2023	(Ghana) Isaac Frimpong	Nkoranza Warriors	Nsoatreman	Undisclosed
July 11, 2023	(Ghana) Anokye Morrison	Berekum Chelsea	Nsoatreman	Undisclosed
July 20, 2023	(Ghana) Kelvin Osei Asibey	Eleven Wonders	Hearts of Oak	Free
July 26, 2023	(Ghana) Konadu Yiadom	Hearts of Oak	(Ukraine) Kryvbas Kryvyi Rih	Undisclosed
July 26, 2023	(Ghana) Ibrahim Yaro	Medeama	Unattached	
July 28, 2023	(Ghana) Richard Boadu	Asante Kotoko	(Libya) Al-Ahly SC	$150,000
July 29, 2023	(Ghana) Salifu Mudasiru	Asante Kotoko	(Saudi Arabia) Al-Bukiryah	Undisclosed
July 29, 2023	(Ghana) Hafiz Konkoni	Bechem United	(Tanzania) Young Africans	$100,000
July 30, 2023	(Ghana) Bassit Seidu	Accra Lions	(Sudan) Al-Hilal Club	Undisclosed
August 2, 2023	(Ghana) Lord Bawa Martey	Dreams FC	Unattached	
August 2, 2023	(Ghana) Maxwell Arthur	Dreams FC	Unattached	
August 2, 2023	(Ghana) Kingsley Owusu	Dreams FC	Unattached	
August 2, 2023	(Ghana) Samuel Arthur	Dreams FC	Unattached	
August 2, 2023	(Ghana) Ibrahim Abdulai	Dreams FC	Unattached	
August 2, 2023	(Ghana) Kwame Gogoe Boahene	Dreams FC	Unattached	
August 2, 2023	(Ghana) Victor Oduro	Dreams FC	Unattached	
August 3, 2023	(Ghana) Benjamin Bature	King Faisal	Medeama	Undisclosed
August 3, 2023	(Ghana) Ibrahim Larbi	Mountaineers FC	Medeama	Undisclosed
August 3, 2023	(Ghana) Ernest Mwankurinah	Medeama	Unattached	
August 3, 2023	(Ghana) Ishmael Hammond	Medeama	Unattached	
August 3, 2023	(Ghana) Darlington Gyanfosu	Medeama	Unattached	
August 4, 2023	(Ghana) Richard Akrofi	Nsoatreman	Medeama	Undisclosed
August 4, 2023	(Ghana) Samuel Adom	King Faisal	Rivers United	Loan
August 6, 2023	(Ghana) Raphael Amponsah	Asekem FC	Accra Hearts of Oak	Undisclosed
August 6, 2023	(Ghana) Evans Adomako	Asekem FC	Accra Hearts of Oak	Undisclosed
August 6, 2023	(Ghana) Martin Karikari	Asekem FC	Accra Hearts of Oak	Undisclosed
August 8, 2023	(Zimbabwe) Kudakwashe Mahachi	(South Africa) SuperSport United	Medeama	Undisclosed
August 13, 2023	(Ghana) Abdul Manaf Umar	RTU	Nsoatreman	Undisclosed
August 15, 2023	(Ghana) Kalo Ouattara	Berekum Chelsea	Asante Kotoko	Undisclosed
August 15, 2023	(Ghana) Henry Ansu	Berekum Chelsea	Asante Kotoko	Undisclosed
August 15, 2023	(Ghana) Joseph Amoako	Asante Kotoko	Unattached	
August 17, 2023	(Ghana) Samuel Boateng	Asante Kotoko	Unattached	
August 17, 2023	(Ghana) Mohammed Alhassan	Asante Kotoko	Unattached	
August 17, 2023	(Ghana) Charles Owusu	Asante Kotoko	Unattached	
August 17, 2023	(Ghana) Dickson Afoakwa	Asante Kotoko	Unattached	
August 17, 2023	(Ghana) Samuel Asamoah	Bofoakwa Tano	Asante Kotoko	Undisclosed
August 25, 2023	(Ghana) Dennis Votere	Accra Lions	Nsoatreman	Undisclosed

and
