= SWAG Cup =

Ghana football cup game

H.P. Nyemetei SWAG Cup
- Organiser(s): Sport Writers Association of Ghana
- Founded: 1972; 54 years ago
- Region: Ghana
- Teams: 2
- Current champions: Asante Kotoko
- Most championships: Asante Kotoko (16 titles)
- Broadcaster: GTV
- Website: SWAG CUP

The SWAG Cup (Sports Writers Association of Ghana Cup) is an annual one-off game, featuring two selected clubs at the end of the season. The cup is called the H.P. Nyemitei Cup in honour of former GFA president Henry Plange Nyemitei and the SIC H.P. Nyemitei Cup for sponsorship reasons. football season. The game is the official shutdown match for the football season in Ghana.

Organised by the SWAG, proceeds from the game go into programmes of SWAG including SWAG Awards and other community development activities of the organization. The fixture was first played in the 1972 season.

The current holders are Asante Kotoko, who defeated rivals Ashanti Gold 1–0 in the 2015 match. Asante Kotoko who also hold the record for most wins with 16 titles.

== History ==
The SWAG cup was instituted by the Sports Writers Association Ghana in 1972, with the first edition being played on 31 December 1972 between Ebusua Dwarfs and Hearts of Oak at Ohene Djan Stadium, Accra as Dwarfs defeated Hearts 3–1 to emerge as the inaugural winners. The second edition was organized on 23 December 1973 with Hearts of Oak beating Kumasi Cornerstone 1–0 through by Robert Hammond at the Ohene Djan Stadium.

The SWAG cup is called H.P. Nyemitei Cup as it is played in honor of Henry Plange Nyemitei, a former Ghana Football Association president, Accra Hearts of Oak director, who also worked as a deputy managing director of the State Insurance Company (SIC) who are the sponsors of match. Nyemetei was also the chief patron of SWAG. Since 1983, SIC has been the headline sponsors of the match. They support the annual match by assisting the association in raising funds for its social, community development activities and programmes including the SWAG Awards and also serving as a catalyst in social development through football.

In 2015, Asante Kotoko defeated Ashanti Gold by 1–0, via a late free kick from Eric Donkor.

== List of finals ==
Year	Winners	Score	Runners up
1972	Ebusua Dwarfs	3–1	Hearts of Oak
1973	Hearts of Oak	n/a	
1974*	Hearts of Oak Bofoakwa Tano		
1975	Bofoakwa Tano	n/a	
1976	Dumas Boys of GTP	n/a	
1977*	Hearts of Oak Dumas Boys of GTP		
1978	Hearts of Oak	n/a	
1979	Hearts of Oak	n/a	
1980	Eleven Wise	n/a	
1981	Asante Kotoko	n/a	
1982	Sekondi Hasaacas	n/a	
1983	Sekondi Hasaacas	n/a	
1984	Hearts of Oak	n/a	
1985	Hearts of Oak	n/a	
1986	Asante Kotoko	n/a	
1987	Okwahu United	n/a	
1988	Asante Kotoko	n/a	
1989	Asante Kotoko	n/a	
1990	Asante Kotoko	n/a	
1991	Asante Kotoko	n/a	
1992	Asante Kotoko	n/a	
1993	Asante Kotoko	n/a	
1994	Ashanti Gold	n/a	
1995	Ashanti Gold	n/a	
1996	Not held		
1997	Swedru All Blacks	1–0	Asante Kotoko
1998	Asante Kotoko Swedru All Blacks*	0–0	
1999	Not held		
2000	Asante Kotoko	1–0	King Faisal
2001	Asante Kotoko		
2002	Not held		
2003	Asante Kotoko	2–1	Liberty Professionals
2004	Not held		
2005	Asante Kotoko	2–1	OC Agaza
2006	Ashanti Gold	1–0	Asante Kotoko
2007	Liberty Professionals	3–0	Hearts of Oak
2008	Asante Kotoko	2–1	Ashanti Gold
2009	Heart of Lions	2–1 agg.	Asante Kotoko
2010	Ashanti Gold	1–0 agg.	Hearts of Oak
2011–14	Not held		
2015	Asante Kotoko	1–0	Ashanti Gold
2016–Present	Not held		

=== Performance by club ===
Club	Winners	Winning years
Asante Kotoko	15	1986, 1988, 1989, 1990, 1991, 1992,1993,1998*, 2000, 2001, 2003, 2005, 2008, 2015
Hearts of Oak	7	1973, 1974*, 1977*,1978, 1979, 1984, 1985
Ashanti Gold	4	1994, 1995, 2006, 2010
Sekondi Hasaacas	2	1982, 1983
Bofoakwa Tano	2	1974*, 1975
Dumas Boys of GTP	2	1976, 1977*
Eleven Wise	1	1980
Okwawu United	1	1987
Swedru All Blacks	1	1997, 1998*
Ebusua Dwarfs	1	1972
Liberty Professionals	1	2007
Heart of Lions	1	2009

Note: * are shared titles

== See also ==
- Football in Ghana
- Ghana Premier League
- Ghana FA Cup
