= 2024–25 Ghana Premier League =

69th season of the Ghana Premier League

Ghana Premier League
- Season: 2024–25
- Dates: 8 September 2024 — 8 June 2025
- Champions: Bibiani Gold Stars (1st title)
- Relegated: Nsoatreman; Legon Cities; Accra Lions
- Champions League: Bibiani Gold Stars
- Matches: 306
- Goals: 543 (1.77 per match)
- Top goalscorer: Stephen Amankona (15 goals)
- Biggest home win: Medeama 4–0 Dreams (11 April 2025); Bibiani Gold Stars 4–0 Accra Lions (8 June 2025)
- Biggest away win: Accra Lions 0–3 Bibiani Gold Stars (19 January 2025)
- Highest scoring: Accra Lions 5–3 Aduana Stars (17 May 2025)
- Longest winning run: Bibiani Gold Stars (7 matches)
- Longest unbeaten run: Bibiani Gold Stars & Bechem United (10 matches )
- Longest winless run: Dreams (9 matches)
- Longest losing run: Legon Cities (7 matches)
- All statistics correct as of 9 June 2025. live matches on StarTimes Ghana.

The 2024–25 Ghana Premier League was the 69th season of the top professional association football league in Ghana. At the end of the season the winners qualified for the CAF Champions League next season while the bottom three teams were relegated to the Division One League.

Samartex were the defending champions. On 8 June 2025, Bibiani Gold Stars won their maiden league title in dramatic style at the final round of matches after longtime leaders, Nations FC, failed to win their last match of the season. With an average of 20,381, Asante Kotoko recorded by far the highest average home league attendance in the 2024–25 Ghana Premier League.

== Teams ==
The following 18 clubs competed in the Ghana Premier League this season; 15 clubs remaining from the previous season's Premier League and Division One League.

=== Team changes ===
▲ Promoted from 2023–24 Division One League	▼ Relegated to 2024–25 Division One League
Young Apostles; Holy Stars; Vision FC	Great Olympics; Bofoakwa Tano; Real Tamale United

Location of the 2024–25 Ghana Premier League teams

=== Stadiums and locations ===
Team	Location	Venue	Capacity
Accra Lions	Accra	Accra Sports Stadium	40,000
Aduana Stars	Dormaa Ahenkro	Agyeman Badu Stadium	7,000
Asante Kotoko	Kumasi	Baba Yara Stadium	40,528
Basake Holy Stars	Ainyinase	CAM Park	5,000
Bechem United	Bechem	Nana Gyeabour's Park	5,000
Berekum Chelsea	Berekum	Sports Stadium	5,000
Bibiani Gold Stars	Bibiani	Dun's Park	7,000
Dreams	Dawu	Dawu Sports Stadium	5,000
Heart of Lions	Kpando	Kpando Stadium	5,000
Hearts of Oak	Accra	Accra Sports Stadium	40,000
Karela United	Nalerigu	Naa Sheriga Sports Complex	1,000
Legon Cities	Accra	El Wak Stadium	7,000
Medeama	Tarkwa	TNA Park	10,000
Nations FC	Kumasi	Dr. Kwame Kyei Sports Complex	12,000
Nsoatreman	Nsuatre	Nana Kronmansah Park	2,000
Samartex	Samreboi	Samartex Park	7,000
Vision FC	Tema	Nii Adjei Kraku II Sports Complex	2,500
Young Apostles FC	Wenchi	Wenchi Sports Stadium	1,000

== League table ==
Pos	Team	Pld	W	D	L	GF	GA	GD	Pts	Promotion or relegation
1	Bibiani Gold Stars (C)	34	18	9	7	38	21	+17	63	CAF Champions League
2	Heart of Lions	34	17	9	8	38	24	+14	60	
3	Hearts of Oak	34	16	10	8	32	18	+14	58	
4	Asante Kotoko	34	16	10	8	37	27	+10	58	
5	Nations FC (Note: Nations FC were deducted 3 points and 3 goals for failing to complete their game against Holy Stars.)	34	18	6	10	40	22	+18	57	
6	Dreams	34	14	10	10	31	29	+2	52	
7	Samartex	34	13	12	9	33	25	+8	51	
8	Medeama	34	15	5	14	44	34	+10	50	
9	Aduana Stars	34	12	11	11	39	34	+5	47	
10	Bechem United (Note: Bechem United were deducted 3 points and 3 goals for failing to honour a match against Holy Stars.)	34	14	8	12	32	28	+4	47	
11	Vision	34	11	12	11	34	35	−1	45	
12	Holy Stars (Note: Holy Stars were awarded 3 points and 3 goals by Federation decision.)	34	11	8	15	35	37	−2	44	
13	Berekum Chelsea	34	12	8	14	35	35	0	44	
14	Karela	34	11	8	15	28	26	+2	41	
15	Young Apostles	34	10	10	14	24	36	−12	40	
16	Accra Lions	34	9	8	17	32	44	−12	35	Relegation to Division One League
17	Legon Cities	34	7	4	23	23	53	−30	25	Relegation to Division One League
18	Nsoatreman (Note: Nsoatreman were deducted 6 points due to Federation decision. All matches from the 20th round involving Nsoatreman are awarded as a 3–0 win to their opponents as the club was dissolved.)	34	5	6	23	17	64	−47	15	Withdrew

Source: Ghana Premier League and Flashscore
Rules for classification: 1) Points; 2) Goal difference; 3) Goals scored; 4) Head-to-head points; 5) Head-to-head goal difference; 6) Head-to-head goals scored; 7) Play-off
(C) Champions

== Results ==
Home \ Away	ACC	ADU	ASA	BEC	BER	BIB	DRE	HOL	HEA	HOS	KAR	LEG	MED	NAT	NSO	SAM	VIS	YOU
Accra Lions		5–3	3–0	2–0	1–1	0–3	0–2	0–0	2–3	2–1	0–0	2–1	1–0	1–0	3–1	1–1	0–2	0–0
Aduana Stars	0–0		0–2	1–0	3–2	2–0	2–0	1–1	2–0	3–1	1–0	4–0	2–2	1–2	3–0	0–1	1–0	2–2
Asante Kotoko	1–0	1–0		1–1	1–0	2–0	4–1	0–1	1–0	1–0	1–0	2–0	3–2	0–2	1–0	1–0	4–1	1–1
Bechem United	1–0	0–0	1–0		1–2	0–2	1–0	3–0	1–0	0–0	0–0	1–0	2–0	2–0	3–0	1–0	2–0	1–0
Berekum Chelsea	3–1	0–0	1–1	1–2		2–3	0–0	1–0	0–1	2–2	1–0	3–1	2–1	1–0	3–0	0–0	1–0	1–0
Bibiani Gold Stars	4–0	2–0	0–0	1–0	2–0		0–0	2–1	1–1	1–0	0–1	2–1	1–0	1–0	2–1	0–0	2–0	1–0
Dreams	1–0	0–0	1–2	1–0	1–0	2–0		2–2	0–0	2–1	0–1	4–1	1–0	0–1	3–0	0–0	1–1	1–0
Heart of Lions	3–1	2–1	1–1	2–1	1–0	0–0	1–2		2–0	3–1	1–0	3–0	1–0	0–1	1–0	2–1	0–0	1–0
Hearts of Oak	3–1	0–0	0–0	2–0	3–1	0–1	0–1	1–0		0–1	0–0	1–0	1–0	0–1	1–1	1–0	1–0	2–0
Holy Stars	2–1	1–1	1–1	3–0	2–1	0–1	0–0	0–0	0–0		1–0	1–0	1–2	1–0 (Note: Match was awarded as a 1–0 win for Holy Stars after Nations FC failed to complete the game.)	3–0	1–0	1–0	3–0
Karela United	1–1	2–0	0–1	2–1	2–1	1–1	1–2	1–0	0–1	1–1		2–0	3–1	0–1	3–0	1–1	1–1	3–0
Legon Cities	0–0	0–1	2–1	0–2	2–1	1–0	3–0	0–1	0–2	2–1	0–2		0–1	1–4	3–0	0–2	1–1	2–0
Medeama	1–0	2–0	1–1	3–1	1–2	2–0	4–0	0–0	0–2	2–1	1–0	1–0		1–0	3–0	0–0	3–1	3–0
Nations FC	1–0	0–1	2–0	0–0	0–1	1–1	1–0	0–2	0–0	3–1	1–0	3–0	2–1		3–0	3–0	3–0	1–2
Nsoatreman	0–3	1–1	1–0	2–2	0–0	0–3	1–1	0–3	0–3	2–0	1–0	3–1	1–1	0–3		0–1	0–3	2–0
Samartex	2–0	2–1	1–1	2–1	1–0	1–1	1–1	0–1	0–0	3–0	2–0	1–0	2–1	1–1	2–0		2–1	0–1
Vision	2–1	0–0	3–1	1–1	0–0	2–0	0–1	1–1	1–1	1–0	1–0	1–1	3–2	0–0	1–0	3–2		2–0
Young Apostles	1–0	3–2	0–0	0–0	2–1	0–0	1–0	3–1	1–2	2–0	2–0	0–0	0–2	0–0	1–0	1–1	1–1	

Updated to match(es) played on 8 June 2025. Source: NPFL
Legend: Blue = home team win; Yellow = draw; Red = away team win.

All matches from the 20th round involving Nsoatreman are awarded as a 3–0 win to their opponents as the club was dissolved.

== Statistics ==
=== Top scorers ===
As of 8 June 2025

Rank	Player	Club	Goals
1	(Ghana) Stephen Amankona	Berekum Chelsea	15
2	(Ghana) Faisal Charwetey	Nations FC	12
2	(Ghana) Albert Amoah	Asante Kotoko	12
4	(Ghana) Nana Oppong	Heart of Lions	11
4	(Ghana) Samuel Attah Kumi	Bibiani Gold Stars	11
4	(Ghana) Joseph Esso	Dreams FC	11
7	(Ghana) Kwame Opoku	Asante Kotoko	9
8	(Ghana) Mamudu Kamaradin	Medeama	8
8	(Ghana) Prince Tweneboah	Holy Stars	8

=== Hattricks ===
Player	For	Against	Score	Date	Ref(s)
(Ghana) Nana Oppong	Heart of Lions	Holy Stars	3–1 (H)	21 December 2024	
(Ghana) Samuel Attah Kumi	Bibiani Gold Stars	Accra Lions	3–0 (A)	19 January 2025	
(Ghana) Stephen Amankona	Berekum Chelsea	Accra Lions	3–1 (H)	9 March 2025	
(Ghana) Braye Kingsley	Medeama	Dreams	4–0 (H)	12 April 2025	
(Ghana) Albert Amoah	Asante Kotoko	Medeama	3–2 (H)	1 June 2025	

Notes

(H) – Home team
(A) – Away team

== Attendances ==
#	Football club	Average attendance
1	Asante Kotoko	20,381
2	Hearts of Oak	6,154
3	Bibiani Gold Stars	1,832
4	Nations FC	1,205
5	Heart of Lions	1,051
6	Medeama SC	980
7	Dreams FC	905
8	Samartex	856
9	Aduana Stars	874
10	Bechem United	725
11	Berekum Chelsea	673
12	Vision FC	593
13	Karela United	568
14	Holy Stars	510
15	Legon Cities FC	427
16	Nsoatreman FC	344
17	Young Apostles	189
18	Accra Lions FC	138
