= 2009–10 Ghana Premier League =

2009–10 Glo Premier League
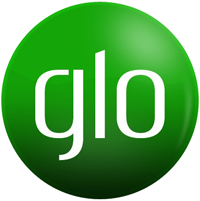
- Season: 2009–10
- Champions: Aduana Stars
- Champions League: Aduana Stars
- Top goalscorer: (Ghana) Samuel Affum (Ghana) Bismark Idan (13 goals)

The 2009–10 Ghanaian Premier League (known as the Glo Premier League for sponsorship reasons) season was the 51st season of top-tier football in Ghana. The competition began on 18 October 2009, and ended on 12 May 2010. Aduana Stars won the league for the first time in the club's history, despite scoring only 19 goals in 30 matches.

== League table ==
Pos	Team	Pld	W	D	L	GF	GA	GD	Pts	Qualification or relegation
1	Aduana Stars (C)	30	15	8	7	19	10	+9	53	Qualification for 2011 CAF Champions League
2	Ashanti Gold	30	15	8	7	36	22	+14	53	
3	Hearts of Oak	30	13	8	9	39	30	+9	47	
4	Heart of Lions	30	13	7	10	38	34	+4	46	
5	Asante Kotoko	30	11	11	8	35	27	+8	44	
6	All Stars FC	30	12	8	10	33	33	0	44	
7	Berekum Arsenal	30	12	7	11	27	33	−6	43	
8	Berekum Chelsea	30	11	9	10	26	20	+6	42	
9	Medeama SC	30	14	3	13	39	44	−5	45	
10	King Faisal Babes	30	12	6	12	35	27	+8	42	
11	Real Tamale United	30	11	7	12	30	36	−6	40	
12	New Edubiase United	30	11	6	13	32	33	−1	39	
13	Liberty Professionals	30	10	8	12	32	29	+3	38	
14	Great Olympics (R)	30	9	7	14	31	40	−9	34	Relegation to Ghanaian Football Leagues
15	Sekondi Wise Fighters (R)	30	8	7	15	38	46	−8	31	Relegation to Ghanaian Football Leagues
16	Sekondi Hasaacas (R)	30	5	6	19	28	54	−26	21	Relegation to Ghanaian Football Leagues

Source: FIFA.com
Rules for classification: 1) points; 2) goal difference; 3) number of goals scored.
(C) Champions; (R) Relegated
