= 2025–26 Premier League (disambiguation) =

The 2025–26 Premier League was a professional association football league season in England.

2025–26 Premier League may also refer to:

== Association football ==
- 2025–26 Armenian Premier League
- 2025–26 Azerbaijan Premier League
- 2025–26 Bangladesh Premier League
- 2025–26 Premier League of Bosnia and Herzegovina
- 2025–26 Cambodian Premier League
- 2025–26 Egyptian Premier League
- 2025–26 Ghana Premier League
- 2025–26 Hong Kong Premier League
- 2025–26 Israeli Premier League
- 2025–26 Lebanese Premier League
- 2025–26 Maltese Premier League
- 2025–26 Namibia Premier League
- 2025–26 Russian Premier League
- 2025–26 Ukrainian Premier League
- 2025–26 Welsh Premier League

== Basketball ==
- 2025–26 Israeli Basketball Premier League
