= 2025–26 Ghana Premier League =

70th Ghana football league season

Ghana Premier League
- Season: 2025–26
- Dates: 12 September 2025 – 24 May 2026
- Champions: Medeama (2nd title)
- Relegated: Eleven Wonders; Hohoe United; Nations
- Champions League: Medeama
- Matches: 306
- Goals: 605 (1.98 per match)
- Top goalscorer: Samuel Attah Kumi (19 goals)
- Biggest home win: Asante Kotoko 6–0 Bechem (28 December 2025)
- Biggest away win: Eleven Wonders 1–4 Heart of Lions (20 September 2025)
- Highest scoring: Swedru All Blacks 5–2 Eleven Wonders (6 May 2026); Medeama 5–2 Heart of Lions (17 May 2026)
- Longest winning run: Aduana Stars & Medeama (4 matches)
- Longest unbeaten run: Medeama (16 matches)
- Longest winless run: Eleven Wonders (13 matches)
- Longest losing run: Eleven Wonders (9 matches)

The 2025–26 Ghana Premier League was the 70th season of the Ghana Premier League, the top-tier football league in Ghana that began on 12 September 2025 and ended on 24 May 2026.

Medeama were crowned league winners for a second time after a 5–2 win over Heart of Lions on 17 May 2026 with a game to spare and thus represented Ghana in the following season's CAF Champions League. After finishing the season with winning the Ghana FA Cup and a point below Young Apostles, Nations got relegated to the Ghana Division One after 3 years in the top flight, with Eleven Wonders and Hohoe United following suit after only a year of promotion.

With an average attendance of 20,163, Asante Kotoko recorded the highest average home league attendance.

== Teams ==
This season's league consisted of 18 teams – the top 15 teams from the previous season, and three teams promoted from the previous season's Division One League.

=== Changes from the previous season ===
Hohoe United, Eleven Wonders and Swedru All Blacks were promoted from the 2024–25 Division One League, replacing the 2024–25 bottom three teams; Nsoatreman, Legon Cities and Accra Lions.

=== Promotion and relegation ===
▲ Promoted from 2024–25 Division One League	▼ Relegated to 2025–26 Division One League
Hohoe United; Eleven Wonders; Swedru All Blacks	Nsoatreman; Legon Cities; Accra Lions

=== Stadiums and locations ===
Location of the 2025–26 Ghana Premier League teams

Team	Location	Venue	Capacity
Aduana Stars	Dormaa	Agyeman Badu Stadium	7,000
All Black	Swedru	Swedru Sports Stadium	5,000
Asante Kotoko	Kumasi	Baba Yara Stadium	40,528
Basake Holy Stars	Ainyinase	CAM Park	5,000
Bechem United	Bechem	Nana Gyeabour's Park	5,000
Berekum Chelsea	Berekum	Berekum Sports Stadium	5,000
Bibiani Goldstars	Bibiani	Dun's Park	7,000
Dreams	Dawu	Dawu Sports Stadium	5,000
Eleven Wonders	Techiman	Obuasi Len Clay Sports Stadium	7,000
Heart of Lions	Kpando	Kpando Stadium	5,000
Hearts of Oak	Accra	Accra Sports Stadium	40,000
Hohoe United	Hohoe	Hohoe Sports Stadium	2,000
Karela United	Nalerigu	Naa Sheriga Sports Complex	1,000
Medeama	Tarkwa	TNA Park	15,000
Nations FC	Kumasi	Dr. Kwame Kyei Sports Complex	12,000
Samartex	Samreboi	Nsenkyire Sports Arena	7,000
Vision FC	Tema	Nii Adjei Kraku II Sports Complex	2,500
Young Apostles FC	Wenchi	Wenchi Sports Stadium	1,000

== League table ==
Pos	Team	Pld	W	D	L	GF	GA	GD	Pts	Qualification or relegation
1	Medeama	34	17	11	6	52	28	+24	62	CAF Champions League
2	Bibiani GoldStars	34	19	3	12	46	40	+6	60	
3	Hearts of Oak	34	13	15	6	25	15	+10	54	
4	Dreams	34	15	7	12	49	32	+17	52	
5	Aduana Stars	34	13	11	10	29	24	+5	50	
6	Berekum Chelsea	34	14	8	12	35	33	+2	50	
7	Samartex	34	13	11	10	26	25	+1	50	
8	Asante Kotoko	34	13	10	11	41	29	+12	49	
9	Karela	34	13	10	11	32	33	−1	49	
10	Vision	34	12	11	11	38	34	+4	47	
11	Bechem United	34	13	8	13	38	39	−1	47	
12	Holy Stars	34	13	7	14	30	39	−9	46	
13	Heart of Lions	34	12	9	13	36	33	+3	45	
14	All Blacks	34	12	9	13	34	31	+3	45	
15	Young Apostles	34	12	9	13	37	37	0	45	
16	Nations FC	34	12	8	14	30	31	−1	44	Relegation to Division One League
17	Hohoe United (Note: Hohoe United pulled out of the league after Matchday 27 with their remaining games left unplayed and undecided.)	34	7	9	18	22	50	−28	30	Relegation to Division One League
18	Eleven Wonders	34	3	4	27	26	73	−47	13	Relegation to Division One League

Source: Premier League, Flashscore, livescore
Rules for classification: 1) Points; 2) Goal difference; 3) Goals scored; 4) Head-to-head points; 5) Head-to-head goal difference; 6) Head-to-head goals scored; 7) Play-off

== Results ==
Each team plays each other twice (34 matches each), once at home and once away.

Home \ Away	ADU	ALL	ASA	BEC	BER	BIB	DRE	ELE	HOL	HEA	HOH	HOS	KAR	MED	NAT	SAM	VIS	YOU
Aduana Stars		2–1	0–0	2–1	3–1	2–1	1–0	2–0	0–0	0–0	0–0	0–0	2–1	0–0	1–0	0–0	0–1	3–1
All Blacks	0–2		2–1	1–1	3–0	0–1	1–0	5–2	1–1	0–0	1–0	2–0	1–1	0–0	1–1	1–0	2–0	0–0
Asante Kotoko	1–1	1–2		6–0	0–0	2–0	1–0	2–0	0–0	0–1		3–0	4–2	2–2	3–0	1–2	0–0	2–1
Bechem United	2–1	2–0	3–1		1–0	1–0	1–2	1–0	1–0	0–0	1–2	0–0	0–0	1–1	0–0	2–0	2–0	1–0
Berekum Chelsea	1–0	0–0	0–1	3–2		2–0	1–0	3–1	2–1	0–2	1–0	2–0	2–0	2–1	2–1	0–0	1–0	1–1
Goldstars	1–0	1–0	0–0	2–1	1–0		3–2	8–3	3–1	2–1		3–0	1–0	0–0	2–1	2–0	1–0	1–0
Dreams	1–0	2–3	2–0	2–1	3–1	3–1		5–1	3–0	0–1	1–0	2–0	0–1	2–1	2–0	2–0	1–1	1–1
Eleven Wonders	0–1	0–2	0–2	1–3	0–2	2–3	2–0		1–4	0–3		2–0	0–0	1–2	0–2	2–2	0–3	0–1
Heart of Lions	0–1	1–0	3–1	1–0	1–0	1–2	1–0	1–0		0–0		3–0	0–0	0–1	0–1	3–0	2–0	2–0
Hearts of Oak	0–0	2–2	0–1	0–0	0–0	2–2	0–0	1–0	0–0		0–0	0–0	0–0	4–2	1–0	1–0	1–0	1–0
Hohoe United	0–2	2–0	1–0			0–1	0–3	1–1	0–0	0–1			4–1	1–1	2–1	1–0	2–2	1–1
Holy Stars	2–0	1–0	2–1	2–1	2–0	2–0	1–4	0–0	1–0	1–2	2–0		1–0	0–1	1–0	2–0	2–2	1–0
Karela	1–0	1–0	1–0	2–0	1–1	2–0	1–1	2–0	2–2	2–0	1–0	3–2		1–0	0–1	0–1	1–0	2–1
Medeama	1–1	1–0	4–0	0–0	2–1	2–0	2–1	2–0	5–2	1–0	1–2	1–1	3–1		2–1	1–1	4–0	3–0
Nations FC	1–0	2–1	0–0	3–0	1–1	2–0	1–1	3–2	2–1	0–1	1–1	2–0	0–0	2–1		0–0	0–1	1–0
Samartex	1–0	1–0	0–0	1–2	1–0	2–0	0–0	2–1	1–0	1–0	2–0	3–1	1–1	0–0	2–0		0–0	2–0
Vision	3–0	1–2	0–0	3–2	3–1	3–0	2–2	2–1	2–2	1–0	2–0	0–0	3–0	1–2	1–0	0–0		0–0
Young Apostles	2–2	1–0	0–2	3–2	1–1	3–1	2–1	3–0	3–0	0–0	2–2	2–0	2–1	0–2	1–0	2–0	3–1	

Source: Soccerway, Sofascore
Legend: Blue = home team win; Yellow = draw; Red = away team win.

== Statistics ==
=== Top scorers ===
Rank	Player	Club	Goals
1	(Ghana) Augustine Okrah	Bechem	17
2	(Ghana) Richmond Opoku	Young Apostles	13
2	(Ghana) Samuel Attah Kumi	Bibiani GoldStar	13
4	(Ghana) Salim Adams	Medeama	12
4	(Ghana) Seidu Suraj	Dreams FC	12
6	(Ghana) Rudolf Mensah	Swedru All Blacks	11
7	(Ghana) Prince Tweneboah	Holy Stars	10
8	(Ghana) Emmanuel Annor	Nations FC	9
9	(Ghana) Emmanuel Marfo	Aduana	8
9	(Ghana) Michael Ephson	Heart of Lions	8
9	(Ghana) Mawuli Wayo	Hearts of Oak	8

=== Hattricks ===
Player	For	Against	Score	Date	Ref(s)
(Ghana) Emmanuel Annor	Nations FC	Eleven Wonders	3–2 (H)	26 October 2025	

== Controversies ==
After a 2-0 loss against Hearts of Oak on 29 March 2026, Hohoe United decided to withdraw from the league with accusations of alleged match officiating irregularities and bias. On 1 May that year, the Ghana Football Association through its disciplinary committee in response banned Hohoe United from the league system for 3 seasons and declared their players and coaches as free agents, thus ending their brief stay in the top-flight.

On 12 April 2026, after a 1-0 loss against Samartex, the team bus of Berekum Chelsea was targeted in a robbery while on their way back to Berekum, during which its 20-year-old foward, Dominic Frimpong, was shot in the head and died of his injuries despite being afterward rushed to the town's government-built hospital.
