= Obed Owusu =

Ghanaian footballer

Personal information
- Full name: Obed Owusu Yeboah
- Date of birth: 26 July 1990 (age 36)
- Place of birth: Ghana
- Position: Striker

Team information
- Current team: All Blacks

Senior career*
Years	Team	Apps	(Gls)
2004–2006	Okwawu United		
2006	All Blacks		

International career
2009	Ghana	1	(0)
- * Club domestic league appearances and goals

Obed Owusu Yeboah (born 26 July 1990) is a Ghanaian former international footballer who played as a striker.

== Career ==
Owusu formerly played for Okwawu United, and later moved to All Blacks in January 2006.

== International career ==
Owusu earned his first call-up to the Ghana national side on 12 September 2009, and made his international debut on 31 September 2009 against Argentina.
