= Mohammad Tijani =

Mohammad Tijani may refer to:

- Muhammad al-Tijani, Tunisian ex-Sunni Twelver Shi'i scholar, academic and theologian.
- Muhammed Tijani, Ghanaian footballer
- Muhamed Tijani, Nigerian footballer
- Mohammad Habibu Tijani, Ghanaian politician
- Mohamed Tijani, Beninese footballer
