= Anane Kobo =

Ghanaian footballer

Personal information
- Place of birth: Ghana
- Position: Forward

Senior career*
Years	Team	Apps	(Gls)
1983–1984	Real Tamale United		
1985–1991	Asante Kotoko		
1991–1992	BA United		
Total			(53)

International career
1983	Ghana	1	(0)
- * Club domestic league appearances and goals

Anane Kobo is a former Ghanaian professional footballer who played as forward. He played for Real Tamale United and Asante Kotoko during his career. Kobo won the Ghana Premier League top goalscorer award twice. He won on two consecutive years in 1983 and 1984.

== Career ==
Kobo started his career with Real Tamale United, a club based in the Northern Ghana, known for producing football talents like Muhammed Choo, Abedi Pele and Mohammed Gargo. During his time at the club, he won the Ghana Premier League top goalscorer award on two consecutive occasions in 1983 and 1984. He later joined Kumasi Asante Kotoko and BA United. He is named as being one of the top players that have been produced from Tamale.

== Honours ==
Real Tamale United

- Ghana Premier League: third place 1984

Asante Kotoko

- Ghana Premier League: 1986, 1987, 1988–89, 1989–90, 1990–91; runner up 1985

=== Individual ===
- Ghana Premier League Top scorer: 1983, 1984
