= 2023–24 Ghana Premier League =

68th season of the Ghana Premier League

Ghana Premier League
- Season: 2023–24
- Dates: 15 August 2023 – 16 June 2024
- Champions: Samartex
- Relegated: Great Olympics; Bofoakwa Tano; Real Tamale United
- Champions League: Samartex
- Matches: 306
- Goals: 625 (2.04 per match)
- Top goalscorer: Stephen Amankona (19 goals)
- Biggest home win: Dreams 8–1 Real Tamale United (12 June 2024)
- Biggest away win: Karela United 0–4 Bechem United (3 December 2023)
- Highest scoring: Dreams 8–1 Real Tamale United (12 June 2024)
- Longest winning run: Aduana Stars & Nations FC (5 matches)
- Longest unbeaten run: Bechem United (10 matches)
- Longest winless run: Heart of Lions (14 matches)
- Longest losing run: Real Tamale United (5 matches)

The 2023–24 Ghana Premier League, sponsored until 30 November 2023 as the betPawa Premier League, was the 68th season of the top professional association football league in Ghana that ran from 15 August 2023 to 16 June 2024.

Medeama were the defending champions after winning the inaugural title in the previous season but finished 8th, partly due to their CAF Champions League commitments. Samartex finished top and won their maiden league title, thus they qualified for the 2024–25 CAF Champions League. Accra Great Olympics, Bofoakwa Tano and Real Tamale United finished bottom of the league and got relegated to the Division One League for next season.

== Teams ==
The following teams competed in the league; 15 teams remaining from the 2022–23 season and 3 teams promoted from the Division One League.

=== Team changes ===
Promoted from 2023 Division One League	Relegated to 2024 Division One League
Bofoakwa Tano; Heart of Lions; Nations	King Faisal; Kotoku Royals; Tamale City

Location of the 2023–24 Ghana Premier League teams

=== Stadiums and locations ===
Team	Location	Venue	Capacity
Accra Lions	Accra	Accra Sports Stadium	40,000
Aduana Stars	Dormaa Ahenkro	Agyeman Badu Stadium	7,000
Asante Kotoko	Kumasi	Baba Yara Stadium	40,000
Bechem United	Bechem	Nana Gyeabour's Park	5,000
Berekum Chelsea	Berekum	Berekum Sports Stadium	5,000
Bibiani Gold Stars	Bibiani	Dun's Park	7,000
Bofoakwa Tano	Sunyani	Coronation Park	5,000
Dreams	Dawu	Dawu Sports Stadium	5,000
Great Olympics	Accra	Accra Sports Stadium	40,000
Heart of Lions	Kpando	Kpando Stadium	5,000
Hearts of Oak	Accra	Accra Sports Stadium	40,000
Karela United	Nalerigu	Naa Sheriga Sports Complex	1,000
Legon Cities	Accra	El Wak Stadium	7,000
Medeama	Tarkwa	TNA Park	15,000
Nations FC	Kumasi	Dr. Kwame Kyei Sports Complex	12,000
Nsoatreman	Nsuatre	Nana Kronmansah Park	2,000
Real Tamale United	Tamale	Aliu Mahama Sports Stadium	20,000
Samartex	Samreboi	Samartex Park	7,000

== League table ==
Pos	Team	Pld	W	D	L	GF	GA	GD	Pts	Qualification or relegation
1	Samartex (C)	34	19	4	11	45	28	+17	61	Qualification for the CAF Champions League
2	Accra Lions	34	14	9	11	37	36	+1	51	
3	Berekum Chelsea	34	15	6	13	37	41	−4	51	
4	Aduana Stars	34	16	2	16	43	36	+7	50	
5	Nsoatreman	34	14	8	12	33	29	+4	50	
6	Asante Kotoko	34	14	7	13	35	29	+6	49	
7	Nations FC	34	14	7	13	32	28	+4	49	
8	Medeama	34	14	7	13	27	26	+1	49	
9	Dreams	34	13	9	12	44	35	+9	48	
10	Bechem United	34	12	12	10	41	34	+7	48	
11	Bibiani Gold Stars	34	12	11	11	41	40	+1	47	
12	Karela United	34	12	10	12	36	42	−6	46	
13	Heart of Lions	34	11	12	11	34	29	+5	45	
14	Hearts of Oak	34	11	12	11	35	31	+4	45	
15	Legon Cities	34	13	6	15	29	38	−9	45	
16	Great Olympics (R)	34	11	11	12	27	27	0	44	Relegation to Division One League
17	Bofoakwa Tano (R)	34	6	15	13	21	36	−15	33	Relegation to Division One League
18	Real Tamale United (R)	34	9	4	21	31	63	−32	31	Relegation to Division One League

Source: Ghana Premier League
Rules for classification: 1) Points; 2) Goal difference; 3) Goals scored; 4) Head-to-head points; 5) Head-to-head goal difference; 6) Head-to-head goals scored; 7) Play-off
(C) Champions; (R) Relegated

== Results ==
Home \ Away	ACC	ADU	ASA	BEC	BER	BIB	BOF	DRE	GRE	HOL	HEA	KAR	LEG	MED	NAT	NSO	RTU	SAM
Accra Lions	—	0–0	0–1	3–0	5–0	2–0	1–0	1–0	1–0	2–1	1–2	2–1	1–0	1–0	0–1	2–1	1–3	1–3
Aduana Stars	0–1	—	3–1	1–0	1–0	3–0	4–2	4–1	3–1	1–0	1–0	1–2	1–0	2–0	1–0	2–2	3–1	1–2
Asante Kotoko	2–3	1–0	—	1–1	1–0	1–0	3–1	0–1	0–1	0–0	1–1	1–1	2–0	1–0	0–1	1–2	1–0	1–0
Bechem United	4–0	1–0	0–0	—	2–0	0–0	1–1	1–0	2–1	1–1	2–3	3–1	1–0	1–2	3–0	0–1	3–2	1–0
Berekum Chelsea	1–1	1–0	2–1	1–1	—	2–0	0–0	3–2	1–0	2–2	0–3	3–0	1–0	2–0	1–0	0–1	2–0	1–0
Bibiani Gold Stars	1–1	1–0	2–1	1–1	3–1	—	2–1	2–1	3–0	2–2	1–1	3–2	4–2	2–0	0–1	1–2	3–0	3–0
Bofoakwa Tano	1–1	1–0	0–2	1–1	0–1	0–0	—	1–1	0–1	1–0	1–0	2–1	0–1	0–2	1–0	0–0	2–1	0–2
Dreams	1–1	2–1	2–0	2–1	0–2	3–0	3–1	—	2–0	1–2	2–2	1–0	2–0	2–1	1–0	1–1	8–1	2–2
Great Olympics	3–0	4–2	0–0	1–1	3–2	1–0	0–0	0–0	—	2–0	0–0	0–0	0–2	0–1	1–0	2–1	3–0 (Note: Great Olympics was awarded a 3–0 win as Real Tamale failed to provide a team for the game.)	0–0
Heart of Lions	2–0	1–2	1–0	1–2	2–0	2–2	0–0	1–0	0–0	—	0–0	0–0	2–0	2–2	3–0	1–0	2–0	1–0
Hearts of Oak	0–1	0–1	2–3	1–0	1–1	0–1	1–1	0–0	0–0	2–1	—	3–1	0–0	3–1	2–0	1–0	3–0	0–0
Karela United	1–1	2–1	1–0	0–4	3–1	1–1	0–0	0–0	0–0	1–0	1–1	—	2–0	0–0	1–0	2–1	3–2	4–2
Legon Cities	0–0	2–1	1–3	1–1	3–2	1–1	1–0	1–0	2–1	1–0	2–0	2–1	—	0–2	1–0	1–0	3–1	1–1
Medeama	2–2	2–0	1–1	1–0	0–1	1–0	0–0	0–0	1–0	0–1	2–0	0–1	1–0	—	1–0	1–0	1–0	1–0
Nations	1–0	2–1	2–2	3–0	1–1	0–0	2–2	1–0	1–0	1–0	1–1	1–0	1–1	1–1	—	4–1	4–0	2–0
Nsoatreman	1–1	1–0	1–0	2–0	0–0	4–0	0–0	0–2	1–1	0–0	1–2	0–1	2–0	1–0	1–0	—	2–0	1–0
Real Tamale United	1–0	1–3	0–2	0–0	0–1	2–2		3–1	0–1	2–2	1–0	3–2	1–0	1–0	1–0	1–2	—	1–0
Samartex	2–0	1–0	1–0	4–1	3–2	1–0	3–0	2–0	1–0	2–0	2–1	3–0	3–0	1–0	0–1	2–0	2–1	—

Source: Global Sports Archive
Legend: Blue = home team win; Yellow = draw; Red = away team win.

== Transfers ==
- List of Ghana Premier League football transfers summer 2023

== Statistics ==
=== Top scorers ===
As of 16 June 2024

Rank	Player	Club	Goals
1	(Ghana) Stephen Amankona	Berekum Chelsea	19
2	(Uganda) Steven Mukwala	Asante Kotoko	14
2	(Ghana) Agyenim Boateng Mensah	Dreams	14
4	(Ghana) Hamza Issah	Hearts of Oak	13
4	(Ghana) Ebenezer Abban	Heart of Lions	13
6	(Ghana) Evans Osei Wusu	Samartex	11
6	(Ghana) Mohammed Mankuyeli	Real Tamale	11
6	(Ghana) Asamoah Boateng Afriyie	Nations FC	11
9	(Ghana) Baba Hamadu Musa	Samartex	10

=== Hattricks ===
Player	For	Against	Score	Date	Ref(s)
(Ghana) Albert Amoah	Accra Great Olympics	Aduana Stars	4–2 (H)	24 March 2024	
(Ghana) Agyenim Boateng Mensah^{5}	Dreams	Real Tamale	8–1 (H)	12 June 2024	

Notes

^{5} Player scored 5 goals
(H) – Home team
(A) – Away team

== Monthly awards ==
Month	Player of the Month		Manager of the Month	
Month	Player	Club	Manager	Club
September	(Ghana) Dauda Saaka	Bofoakwa Tano	(Ghana) Frimpong Manso	Bofoakwa Tano
October	(Ghana) Isaac Mintah	Aduana Stars	(Ghana) Maxwell Konadu	Nsoatreman
November	(Ghana) Augustine Okrah	Bechem United	(Ghana) Christopher Ennin	Berekum Chelsea
December	(Uganda) Steven Mukwala	Asante Kotoko	(Ghana) Prosper Narteh Ogum	Asante Kotoko
February/March	(Ghana) Evans Osei Wusu	Samartex	(Ghana) Kassim Mingle	Nations FC
April	(Ghana) Francis Acquah	Bechem United	(Ghana) Frimpong Manso	Bibiani Gold Stars
May/June	(Ghana) Ebenezer Abban	Hearts of Lions	(Ghana) Bashir Hayford	Hearts of Lions

== Attendances ==
#	Football club	Average attendance
1	Asante Kotoko	11,284
2	Accra Hearts of Oak	3,105
3	Medeama SC	1,140
4	Samartex	1,040
5	Bechem United	696
6	Real Tamale United	696
7	Aduana Stars	608
8	Nsoatreman FC	583
9	Bibiani Gold Stars	516
10	Heart of Lions	440
11	Bofoakwa Tano	430
12	Karela United	350
13	Great Olympics	348
14	Nations FC	262
15	Berekum Chelsea	254
16	Legon Cities FC	212
17	Dreams FC	180
18	Accra Lions FC	110
