= Kofi Deblah =

Ghanaian footballer

Personal information
- Date of birth: 6 August 1971 (age 55)
- Place of birth: Accra, Ghana
- Position: Forward

Senior career*
| Years | Team | Apps | (Gls) |
| 1991–1994 | Kumapim Star | | (7+) |
| 1994–1995 | SC Accra | | |
| 1995–1998 | Goldfields Obuasi | | (49) |
| 1996 | → Rochester Raging Rhinos (loan) | | |
| 1999–2001 | Liberty Professionals | | (1+) |
| 1999–2000 | → TuS Celle (loan) | | |
| 2001–2003 | Diyarbakırspor | 12 | (0) |
| 2005–2006 | Ashanti Gold | | |

International career
| 1997 | Ghana | 1 | (0) |
- * Club domestic league appearances and goals

Kofi Deblah (born 6 August 1971) is a Ghanaian former professional international footballer who played as a striker for Goldfields Obuasi and Ashanti Gold in the Ghana Premier League and the Ghana national team.

He was a key figure in Goldfields' continental football's success between 1995 and 1997 including ending the 1995 African Cup of Champions Clubs as the top scorer.

== Club career ==
Deblah played for Goldfields Obuasi now Ashanti Gold in the Ghana Premier League and won the top scorer of the league on two occasions, in the 1995–96 season and 1996–97 season, scoring 49 goals across the two seasons.

On 25 March 1995, Deblah scored four goals against National Port Authority Anchors (NPA Anchors) in the 1995 African Cup of Champions Clubs. He scored a hattrick in six minutes in the 22nd, 24th and 28th and added the fourth in the 76th. At the end of the competition his four goals made him the top scorer even though they were eliminated in the quarter-finals by ASEC Mimosas.

On 6 May 1997, Deblah featured in the 1997 CAF Champions League and scored an away goal in a 2–1 loss to Al-Hilal, which inspired Goldfields to a 2–0 victory at home to secure a place in the group stage of the competition. The club finished the competition as runners-up after losing to Raja Casablanca on penalties in the finals.

On 10 June 1997, he scored the winning goal in extra time of their Ghana FA Cup quarter-final fixture to beat Cape Coast Ebusua Dwarfs by 2–1 and book a place in the semi-final against Okwawu United. They however lost the semi-final by a lone goal to Okwawu. In July 1997, en route to winning the top scorer for the 1996–97 season, he scored a brace against Bofoakwa Tano to secure a 3–1 league victory.

In 1999, Deblah joined Liberty Professionals, playing as one of the club's experienced players at the time, scoring several goals in Ghana Premier League, including scoring a second half equalizer against Accra Great Olympics in May 1999 to salvage a critical point against the Nungua-based club.

== International career ==
Between 1996 and 1998, Deblah was a member of the Ghana national team, the black stars, he however made his debut on 17 August 1997 in a 1998 FIFA World Cup qualifiers group stage match against Sierra Leone.

== Honours ==
Goldfields Obuasi

- Ghana Premier League: 1995–96
- CAF Champions League runner-up: 1997

Individual

- Ghana Premier League Top Scorer: 1995–96, 1996–97
- African Cup of Champions Clubs Top Scorer: 1995
- SWAG Goal King Award: 1997
