= Tony Yeboah =

Ghanaian footballer (born 1966)

Personal information
- Full name: Anthony Yeboah
- Date of birth: 6 June 1966 (age 60)
- Place of birth: Kumasi, Ghana
- Height: 1.80 m (5 ft 11 in)
- Position: Striker

Senior career*
Years	Team	Apps	(Gls)
1981–1983	Asante Kotoko		
1983–1985	Cornerstone		
1986–1987	Okwawu United	35+	(75+)
1988–1990	1. FC Saarbrücken	65	(26)
1990–1995	Eintracht Frankfurt	123	(68)
1995–1997	Leeds United	47	(24)
1997–2001	Hamburger SV	100	(28)
2001–2002	Al-Ittihad	16	(5)
Total		386	(226)

International career
1985–1997	Ghana	59	(29)
- * Club domestic league appearances and goals

Anthony Yeboah (born 6 June 1966) is a Ghanaian former professional footballer who played as a striker.

He is considered one of the most prominent and prolific goal scorers in Ghanaian and African football history and gained a reputation for scoring spectacular goals which often featured in Goal of the Month or Goal of the Season competitions in the 1990s.

Yeboah is most noted for his time at European clubs 1. FC Saarbrücken, Eintracht Frankfurt, Leeds United and Hamburger SV. He also played for Asante Kotoko, Cornerstone, Okwawu United and Al-Ittihad Doha. He was capped 59 times by Ghana, scoring 29 goals. He now runs an international sports agency and a chain of hotels in Ghana. He won the Bundesliga golden boot on two occasions, 1992–93 and 1993–94, playing for Eintracht Frankfurt.

== Club career ==
=== Ghana ===
Yeboah was born in Kumasi, Ghana. He began at Asante Kotoko in 1981 and he won the Ghana Premier League in 1981, 1982, 1983, and the African Cup of Champions Clubs in 1983. He then played for Cornerstone between 1983 and 1985.

Yeboah joined Okwawu United in early 1986, and he won the Ghana Premier League Top Scorer award in both the 1986 and 1987 seasons. (Note: For Okwawu United, Tony Yeboah scored: No less than 40 goals in 1986.; 35 goals in 35 matches in 1987.)

=== 1. FC Saarbrücken ===
Yeboah joined German club 1. FC Saarbrücken in 1988. This move was of some historical significance, because Yeboah became one of the first black players to appear in the Bundesliga. Yeboah had a slow first year, but then scored 17 league goals in his second Saarbrücken year.

=== Eintracht Frankfurt ===
Yeboah moved to Eintracht Frankfurt in 1990, where he was at first booed by a section of fans and—being the first black player the team had ever signed—subjected to monkey-noises and other racist insults. In the Hesse metropolis, Yeboah quickly established himself and became the first African Bundesliga club captain. He was the top Bundesliga scorer twice with Eintracht, in 1993 and 1994.

In December 1994 Eintracht's new manager Jupp Heynckes ordered extra training for Yeboah, Jay Jay Okocha and Maurizio Gaudino, who subsequently made themselves unavailable for the next fixture and were then suspended indefinitely by the club. Heynckes had also removed the captaincy from Yeboah, whom he considered to be three kilos overweight. Yeboah later attributed a racist motive to Heynckes and was also unhappy at Eintracht blocking his prospective transfer to Bayern Munich.

=== Leeds United ===
Yeboah joined English club Leeds United from Eintracht Frankfurt in January 1995, initially on loan but with an option to sign permanently for £3.4 million. He scored 12 times in 21 league appearances as Leeds finished fifth in the FA Premier League and qualified for the UEFA Cup. In his second season at Elland Road, he was voted Player of the Year. Yeboah scored a total of 32 goals for Leeds United in 66 appearances, and is still revered as a cult hero for the Yorkshire club due to a series of memorable goals he scored. His volley against Liverpool and his strike versus Wimbledon in the 1995–96 season were among his most notable goals, and he was a regular feature in Goal of the Month in the Premier League. He told Newstalk's Team 33 in 2014 that his favourite goal was the one he scored against Liverpool. The goal against Wimbledon was awarded Goal of the Season in 1995–96.

He also scored three hat-tricks for Leeds; the first against Ipswich Town in the Premier League at Elland Road on 5 April 1995, which made him only the third foreign player to score a league hat-trick for Leeds (Cantona v Tottenham in August 1992 was the first, and Phil Masinga three months earlier in an FA Cup tie). Yeboah's second hat-trick came against Monaco in the 1995–96 UEFA Cup on 12 September 1995, and the third 11 days later in the Premier League match against Wimbledon at Selhurst Park which included the aforementioned Goal of the Season. A video was released named ‘Yeboah – Shoot to Kill’ while he was at Leeds.

Injuries (several picked up while on international duty) restricted his game when he played and kept him out of the Leeds side on several occasions. He also developed a well-documented fondness for Yorkshire pudding. A knee injury curtailed his appearances at the end of 1995–96 and he underwent surgery in August 1996. When George Graham took over as Leeds manager in September 1996 he used Yeboah sparingly, considering him to be unfit. This brought about a rift between player and coach, which culminated in Yeboah throwing his shirt in the direction of the bench after being substituted in a 1–0 defeat by Tottenham Hotspur in March 1997.

Yeboah failed to report back for pre-season training ahead of 1997–98, hoping to force a transfer. He was sold to Hamburger SV in September 1997 for a fee of around £1 million, having played just six times in the 1996–97 season under Graham.

=== Hamburger SV ===
Yeboah remained with his German club Hamburger SV until 2001, scoring 28 goals. In January 2001 he was convicted on tax evasion charges relating to a signing on fee he had received when extending his Eintracht Frankfurt contract in 1993. He was fined 360,000 marks by the court and then fell into another financial dispute with the lawyer who had defended him in the case. After making just five appearances in the 2001–02 Hamburger SV season, he began negotiating a release from the final months of his contract in November 2001.

=== Al Ittihad ===
He left in order to join Al Ittihad of the Qatar Stars League in December 2001, where he played under Austrian coach Josef Hickersberger. He scored five goals for the club and retired in 2002.

== International career ==
He was a member of Ghana's national team for over ten years, and represented his country at three Africa Cup of Nations during the 1990s. Yeboah reportedly scored 29 goals in 59 appearances for Ghana, the fourth highest goalscoring total in the nation's history behind Asamoah Gyan, Edward Acquah and Kwasi Owusu. RSSSF records credit Yeboah with 15 goals in 56 caps.

Yeboah featured for Ghana in their 1992 African Cup of Nations final defeat, but the occasion was marred by a dispute over the team captaincy. With Abedi Pele suspended, regular vice-captain Yeboah was controversially overlooked for the captaincy in favour of Anthony Baffoe.

== Post-playing career ==
On 3 November 2008, he was appointed as the new chairman of the newly promoted Ghana Premier League club Berekum Chelsea.

== Personal life ==
Yeboah entered Germany with a passport which stated his year of birth as 1964. He later modified this to 1966, explaining that he had used the pretend 1964 birth year to gain early access to senior football in Ghana when he was only 17 years old.

Yeboah and his cousin, former Mainz player Michael Osei, ran an international sports agency called Anthony Yeboah Sportpromotion and owned a chain of hotels in Ghana (Accra, Kumasi) called Yegoala. Yeboah is married and has two children.

His nephews, Kelvin and Obed Yeboah, are also professional footballers.

== Career statistics ==
=== Club ===
Appearances and goals by club, season and competition
Club	Season	League			National cup		League cup		Continental		Other		Total	
Club	Season	Division	Apps	Goals	Apps	Goals	Apps	Goals	Apps	Goals	Apps	Goals	Apps	Goals
Okwawu United	1986	Ghana Premier League	?	40+	Appearance data unavailable.									
Okwawu United	1987	Ghana Premier League	35	35	Appearance data unavailable.									
1. FC Saarbrücken	1988–89	2. Bundesliga	28	9	2	0	–		–		2 (Note: Bundesliga promotion playoffs)	2	32	11
1. FC Saarbrücken	1989–90	2. Bundesliga	37	17	1	2	–		–		2	1	40	20
1. FC Saarbrücken	Total		100	101	3	2	0	0	0	0	4	3	107	106
Eintracht Frankfurt	1990–91	Bundesliga	26	8	6	2	–		1	1	–		33	11
Eintracht Frankfurt	1991–92	Bundesliga	34	15	1	0	–		3	2	–		38	17
Eintracht Frankfurt	1992–93	Bundesliga	27	20	6	5	–		4	5	–		37	30
Eintracht Frankfurt	1993–94	Bundesliga	22	18	2	1	–		3	1	–		27	20
Eintracht Frankfurt	1994–95	Bundesliga	14	7	2	1	–		5	3	–		21	11
Eintracht Frankfurt	Total		123	68	17	9	0	0	16	12	0	0	156	89
Leeds United	1994–95	Premier League	18	12	2	1	0	0	–		–		20	13
Leeds United	1995–96	Premier League	22	12	6	1	7	3	4	3	–		39	19
Leeds United	1996–97	Premier League	7	0	0	0	0	0	–		–		7	0
Leeds United	Total		47	24	8	2	7	3	4	3	0	0	66	32
Hamburger SV	1997–98	Bundesliga	23	3	0	0	–		0	0	–		23	3
Hamburger SV	1998–99	Bundesliga	34	14	3	2	–		–		–		37	16
Hamburger SV	1999–2000	Bundesliga	24	9	1	0	–		6	3	–		31	12
Hamburger SV	2000–01	Bundesliga	14	2	1	0	1	0	9	2	–		25	4
Hamburger SV	2001–02	Bundesliga	5	0	0	0	–		–		–		5	0
Hamburger SV	Total		100	28	5	2	1	0	15	5	0	0	121	35
Al-Ittihad	2001–02	Qatar Stars League	16	5	Appearance data unavailable.									
Career total			386	226	33	15	8	3	35	20	4	3	466	267

=== International ===
African Cup of Nations only.

Scores and results list Ghana's goal tally first, score column indicates score after each Yeboah goal.

List of international goals scored by Tony Yeboah
No.	Date	Venue	Opponent	Score	Result	Competition
1	17 January 1992	Stade Aline Sitoe Diatta, Ziguinchor, Senegal	Egypt	1–0	1–0	1992 African Cup of Nations
2	20 January 1992	Stade Leopold Senghor, Dakar, Senegal	Congo	1–0	2–1	1992 African Cup of Nations
3	30 August 1992	Accra Sports Stadium, Accra, Ghana	Burkina Faso	1–0	3–0	1994 African Cup of Nations Qualifier
4	30 August 1992	Accra Sports Stadium, Accra, Ghana	Burkina Faso	2–0	3–0	1994 African Cup of Nations Qualifier
5	25 July 1993	Samuel Kanyon Doe Sports Complex, Monrovia, Liberia	Liberia	2–0	2–0	1994 African Cup of Nations Qualifier
6	23 April 1995	Accra Sports Stadium, Accra, Ghana	Niger	1–0	1–0	1996 African Cup of Nations Qualifier
7	14 January 1996	EPRU Stadium, Port Elizabeth, South Africa	Ivory Coast	1–0	2–0	1996 African Cup of Nations
8	28 January 1996	EPRU Stadium, Port Elizabeth, South Africa	Zaire	1–0	1–0	1996 African Cup of Nations

== Honours ==
Asante Kotoko

- Ghana Premier League: 1981, 1982, 1983
- African Cup of Champions Clubs: 1983

Leeds United

- Football League Cup runner-up: 1995–96

Al Ittihad

- Qatar Stars League: 2001–02
- Emir of Qatar Cup: 2001–02
- Qatar Cup runner-up: 2001–02

Ghana

- African Cup of Nations runner-up: 1992
- West African Nations Cup – SCSA Zone III: 1982, 1983, 1984

Individual

- Ghana Premier League top scorer: 1986, 1987
- Bundesliga top scorer: 1992–93, 1993–94
- kicker Bundesliga Team of the Season: 1992–93, 1993–94
- African Footballer of the Year third: 1992; second: 1993
- FIFA World Player of the Year ninth: 1993
- Leeds United Player of the Year: 1996
- Ghana Footballer of the Year: 1997
- Premier League Player of the Month: March 1995, September 1995
