= Dan Owusu =

Ghanaian footballer and manager

Personal information
- Full name: Dan Owusu
- Place of birth: Ghana
- Position: Striker

Senior career*
Years	Team	Apps	(Gls)
1972–1977	Bofoakwa Tano		(78+)
1978	Asante Kotoko		
1979–1980	BA United		
Total			(93)

International career
1975–1977	Ghana		
- * Club domestic league appearances and goals

Dan Owusu is a Ghanaian professional football manager and former player. He played mostly as a striker for Bofoakwa Tano F.C. during his playing days. He won the top goal scorer title for the Ghana Premier League on three occasions.

== Club career ==
Owusu played as a striker for Sunyani-based club Bofoakwa Tano F.C. in the 1970s forming a strike partnership with former Black Stars Captain Kwasi Owusu within that period. He won the Ghana Premier League top goal scorer award three consecutive times, scoring 24 goals in 1974, 26 goals in 1975 and 28 goals in 1976. He is considered as the finest striker in the history of the Ghanaian topflight league.

He later plied his trade with Asante Kotoko and BA United and scored 93 total career goals in the Ghana Premier League.

== International career ==
Owusu also played in the Ghana national team. He was part of the squad of during the 1970s including playing the 1976 African Cup of Nations qualifiers. During his time in the national team, he also formed a good striking partnership with Kwasi Owusu who he played alongside at Bofoakwa Tano.

== Coaching career ==
Owusu began his coaching career in Cameroon coaching a first division club from 1999 to 2005. In October 2005, he was appointed as the head coach of Ghana Premier League side Okwawu United. In his first match, Okwawu United beat Sekondi Hasaacas by 3–0.

In November 2011, he was appointed as the head coach for Bechem United in the Ghana Premier League, becoming the club's third coach in six weeks after sacking Andy Senasson and Miloslav Bogdanovic. In his first match, he led the club to their first Ghana Premier League win by beating Medeama by 1–0, with the goal being scored by Richard Addai. Before his that win, the club had picked only one point, lost five times and conceded 16 goals after six matches in the league.

In November 2012, he was appointed as the manager for his former club Bofoakwa Tano playing then in the Ghana Division One League.

== Honours ==
=== Player ===
Individual

- Ghana Premier League Top scorer: 1974, 1975, 1976
