= Abdul Mumuni =

Ghanaian former footballer (born 1973)

Personal information
- Full name: Abdul Ali Mumuni
- Date of birth: 25 August 1973 (age 53)
- Place of birth: Ghana
- Position: Forward

Senior career*
Years	Team	Apps	(Gls)
1990–1992	Dawu Youngstars		
1994–1996	Hearts of Oak		
1996–1999	Umeå FC	18	(2)
2002–2004	Ersboda SK	39	(32)

International career
1995	Ghana	1	(0)
- * Club domestic league appearances and goals

Abdul Ali Mumuni (born 25 August 1973) is a Ghanaian former footballer who played as a forward. He was the Ghanaian Premier League's top scorer while playing for Dawu Youngstars in the 1991–92 season. This was the first and only occasion Mumuni was the league's top scorer and the first time Dawu Youngstars had had the league's top scorer. Mumuni was also capped once for Ghana.

== Career ==
=== Dawu Youngstars ===
Mumuni joined the club in the 1990–91 season, winning the top-scorer award in his second and last season with the club. Since Mumuni's departure from the club, Dawu have only had one other player win the top-scorer award, namely Oscar Laud in 1993–94.

=== Hearts of Oak ===
Mumuni signed for Hearts of Oak in 1994–95. He spent two years at the Accra-based club before deciding to move to Europe to further his career. Mumuni's only cap for the Ghanaian football team came in 1995, while he was playing for Hearts of Oak.

=== Umea FC ===
Swedish club Umeå FC, only formed in 1987, was Mumuni's first European club. He spent four years at the club, joining in 1996, the year Umea reached the Allsvenskan, Sweden's top-flight, for the only time in their history. However, Mumuni tore his anterior cruciate ligament in March 1996 during pre-season and was injured for the whole season. Umea were relegated in that season and spent the rest of Mumuni's spell at the club in the Division 1 Norra, finishing third, second and seventh from 1997 to 1999. Among Mumuni's teammates at Umea were defender Erik Sandvärn and fellow Ghanaian, Shamo Quaye, a midfielder who also played for Hearts of Oak and Ghana.

Mumuni returned to Umea in September 2005 to play in an exhibition match against Fotbollgymnasiet to celebrate the opening of the club's Sports and Exhibition Centre. The Umea side consisted of players who had won promotion in 1996, with the players picked by Jorgen Sundberg, Umea's most-capped player.

=== Ersboda SK ===
Ersboda SK were Mumuni's final club and he joined in 2002 at the age of 29. In late 2002 he scored the winner in a 2–1 victory against Frösö IF U-19. Ersboda were playing in the Swedish Division Four at the time, but with Mumuni's help were promoted to the third division after winning the league in 2003. In 2004, Mumuni's final season with Ersboda and in football, he scored five times in 12 games, to help Ersboda to an impressive third-place finish in the club's first season in the third division.

== Honours ==
- 1991–92 Ghanaian Premier League top scorer (with Dawu Youngstars)
- 1995–96 Ghanaian FA Cup winners (with Accra Hearts of Oak SC)
- 1998 Division 1 Norra runners-up (with Umea FC)
- 2003 Swedish Division Four winners (with Ersboda SK)
