= Ghana Premier League =

Top professional football division in Ghana

- Logo used since 2022
- Founded: 1958; 68 years ago
- Country: Ghana
- Confederation: CAF
- Number of clubs: 18 (from 2019–20)
- Level on pyramid: 1
- Relegation to: Division One League
- Domestic cups: Ghana FA Cup; Champion of Champions
- International cups: CAF Champions League; CAF Confederation Cup
- Current champions: Medeama (2nd title) (2025–26)
- Most championships: Asante Kotoko (25 titles)
- Broadcaster(s): TV3 Ghana; Max TV Ghana
- Website: Official website
- Current: 2026–27 Ghana Premier League

Previous logo used from 2018 to 2021

The Ghana Premier League is the top professional association football league in Ghana organized by the Ghana Football Association. As of the first quarter of 2024, the league was ranked as the 8th best league in Africa by TeamForm.com.

Ghana has operated a national top-flight league since 1958, in place of a previous league incarnation, the Gold Coast Club Competition, which ran from 1933 to the 1953–54 season. Ahead of the 1989–90 season, the league turned professional and adopted its present name.

Asante Kotoko is the most successful team in the league with 25 titles, followed by Accra Hearts of Oak with 20; the two teams are the oldest and signature professional clubs in the country. The bottom three teams at the end of each season are relegated placed in each individual's regional zone of the Division One League.

On 7 June 2018, the league was terminated midway as a consequence of the "Number 12 corruption exposé that rocked Ghana football. The 2019–20 season was also halted and eventually cancelled; but this time due to the COVID-19 pandemic in Ghana that mirrored the cause of postponement or cancellation of association football leagues and competitions across the globe.

== Broadcasting ==
In September 2013, South African broadcaster SuperSport signed a deal with the Ghana Football Association to broadcast the league on DStv and GOtv. On 23 November 2016, Chinese pay television provider and broadcaster StarTimes secured official television production and broadcast rights for the league, which expired at the end of the 2023–24 season, with numerous reports and interviews stating that StarTimes owes the GFA $1 million and are in negotiations for a new deal. However, hindsight reports indicate that GTV Sports+, the sports channel of Ghanaian state broadcaster, the Ghana Broadcasting Corporation, had secured the rights for the 2024–25 season.

With the StarTimes deal broken down, the Ghana Football Association announced that it has awarded local media company, Media General Ghana (owner of free-to-air television channel TV3), the league broadcasting and commercialization rights on 31 July 2025 ahead of the 2025–26 season. With the rights awarding, Media General created a broadcast consortium with Max TV Ghana of Darkuman called "Adesa Productions" (named after TV3 Ghana's pseudonym land area) through which Max TV TV3, its sister-Akan language free-to-air channel channel Onua TV and TV3's new streaming media platform, Adesa+, will produce and broadcast selected league matches.

== Champions ==
Years	Champions
1958	Hearts of Oak (1)
1959	Asante Kotoko (1)
1960	Eleven Wise (1)
1961–62	Hearts of Oak (2)
1962–63	Real Republicans (1)
1963–64	Asante Kotoko (2)
1964–65	Asante Kotoko (3)
1966	Mysterious Dwarfs (1)
1967	Asante Kotoko (4)
1968	Asante Kotoko (5)
1969	Asante Kotoko (6)
1970	Accra Great Olympics (1)
1971	Hearts of Oak (3)
1972	Asante Kotoko (7)
1973	Hearts of Oak (4)
1974	Accra Great Olympics (2)
1975	Asante Kotoko (8)
1976	Hearts of Oak (5)
1977	Sekondi Hasaacas (1)
1978	Hearts of Oak (6)
1979	Hearts of Oak (7)
1980	Asante Kotoko (9)
1981	Asante Kotoko (10)
1982	Asante Kotoko (11)
1983	Asante Kotoko (12)
1984	Hearts of Oak (8)
1985	Hearts of Oak (9)
1986	Asante Kotoko (13)
1987	Asante Kotoko (14)
1988–89	Asante Kotoko (15)
1989–90	Hearts of Oak (10)
1990–91	Asante Kotoko (16)
1991–92	Asante Kotoko (17)
1992–93	Asante Kotoko (18)
1993–94	Ashanti Gold (1)
1994–95	Ashanti Gold (2)
1995–96	Ashanti Gold (3)
1996–97	Hearts of Oak (11)
1997–98	Hearts of Oak (12)
1999	Hearts of Oak (13)
2000	Hearts of Oak (14)
2001	Hearts of Oak (15)
2002	Hearts of Oak (16)
2003	Asante Kotoko (19)
2004	Hearts of Oak (17)
2005	Asante Kotoko (20)
2006–07	Hearts of Oak (18)
2007–08	Asante Kotoko (21)
2008–09	Hearts of Oak (19)
2009–10	Aduana Stars (1)
2010–11	Berekum Chelsea (1)
2011–12	Asante Kotoko (22)
2012–13	Asante Kotoko (23)
2013–14	Asante Kotoko (24)
2015	Ashanti Gold (4)
2016	Wa All Stars (1)
2017	Aduana Stars (2)
2018	Abandoned
2019	Asante Kotoko (25)
2019–20	Abandoned
2020–21	Hearts of Oak (20)
2021–22	Asante Kotoko (26)
2022–23	Medeama (1)
2023–24	Samartex (1)
2024–25	Bibiani Gold Stars (1)
2025–26	Medeama (2)

== Qualification for CAF competitions ==
=== Association ranking for the 2026–27 CAF club season ===
The association ranking for the 2026–27 CAF Champions League and the 2026–27 CAF Confederation Cup are based on results from each CAF club competition from 2021–22 to the 2025–26 season with the 2026–27 season currently underway.

Legend

- CL: CAF Champions League
- CC: CAF Confederation Cup
- **Associations in bold** are still active in 2026–27 CAF club competitions.
Associations ranked 1–12 are eligible to enter two teams in each CAF club competition.

Rank			Association	2021–22 (× 1)		2022–23 (× 2)		2023–24 (× 3)		2024–25 (× 4)		2025–26 (× 5)		Total
2026	2025	Mvt	Association	CL	CC	CL	CC	CL	CC	CL	CC	CL	CC	Total
1	1	—	**Egypt**	7	4	8	2.5	7	7	10	4	6	6	190
2	2	—	**Morocco**	9	5	8	2	2	4	5	5	9	5	162
3	4	+1	**Algeria**	7	1	6	5	2	3	5	5	3	8	140
4	3	-1	**South Africa**	5	4	4	3	4	1.5	9	3	6	2	127.5
5	5	—	**Tanzania**	0	2	3	4	6	0	2	4	3	1.5	80.5
6	6	—	**Tunisia**	5	1	4	2	6	1	3	0.5	4	0	73
7	7	—	**Angola**	5	0	2	0	3	1.5	2	2	2	0	48.5
8	8	—	**DR Congo**	0	3	1	2	4	0	2	0	1	2	44
9	9	—	**Sudan**	3	0	3	0	2	0	3	0	3	0	42
10	13	+3	**Mali**	0	0	0	1	0	2	1	0.5	3	1	34
11	10	-1	**Ivory Coast**	0	1	0	3	3	0	1	2	0	0.5	30.5
12	12	—	**Nigeria**	0	0	0	2	0	2	0	1	1	0	19
13	11	-2	Libya	0	5	0	0.5	0	3	0	0	0	0	15
14	19	+5	**Congo**	0	1	0	1	0	0.5	0	0	0	2	14.5
15	24	+9	**Zambia**	0	0.5	0	0	0	0	0	0	2	0.5	13
16	14	-2	Ghana	0	0	0	0	1	3	0	0	0	0	12
17	15	-2	Guinea	1	0	2	0	0	0.5	0	0	0	0	6.5
18	16	-2	Botswana	1	0	0	0	1	0	0	0.5	0	0	6
18	18	—	Mauritania	0	0	0	0	2	0	0	0	0	0	6
20	17	-3	Senegal	0	0	0	0	0	0	0	1	0	0	4
21	—	new	**Kenya**	0	0	0	0	0	0	0	0	0	0.5	2.5
21	20	-1	Cameroon	0	0.5	1	0	0	0	0	0	0	0	2.5
23	23	—	Mozambique	0	0	0	0	0	0	0	0.5	0	0	2
23	21	-2	Togo	0	0	0	1	0	0	0	0	0	0	2
23	22	-1	Uganda	0	0	1	0	0	0	0	0	0	0	2
26	25	-1	Eswatini	0	0.5	0	0	0	0	0	0	0	0	0.5
26	25	-1	Niger	0	0.5	0	0	0	0	0	0	0	0	0.5

== Performance by club ==
Clubs	City/region	Years	Winners	Last title
Asante Kotoko	Kumasi, Ashanti Region	1959, 1963–64, 1964–65, 1967, 1968, 1969, 1972, 1975, 1980, 1981, 1982, 1983, 1986, 1987, 1988–89, 1990–91, 1991–92, 1992–93, 2003, 2005, 2007–08, 2011–12, 2012–13, 2013–14, 2019, 2021–22	26	2021–22
Hearts of Oak	Accra, Greater Accra	1958, 1961–62, 1971, 1973, 1976, 1978, 1979, 1984, 1985, 1989–90, 1996–97, 1997–98, 1999, 2000, 2001, 2003, 2004–05, 2006–07, 2008–09, 2020–21	20	2020–21
Ashantigold SC 04 (Note: Known as Obuasi Goldfields until 2002 and this current name since 2024.)	Obuasi, Ashanti Region	1993–94, 1994–95, 1995–96, 2015	4	2015
Accra Great Olympics	Accra, Greater Accra	1970, 1974	2	1974
Medeama	Tarkwa, Western Region	2022–23, 2025–26	2	2025–26
Aduana Stars	Dormaa Ahenkro, Bono Region	2009–10, 2017	2	2017
Eleven Wise	Sekondi-Takoradi, Western Region	1960	1	1960
Real Republicans	Accra, Greater Accra	1962–63	1	1962–63
Mysterious Dwarfs	Cape Coast, Central Region	1967	1	1967
Sekondi Hasaacas	Sekondi-Takoradi, Western Region	1977	1	1977
Berekum Chelsea	Berekum, Bono Region	2010–11	1	2010–11
Legon Cities (Note: Known as Wa All Stars FC until 2018.)	Legon, Accra, Greater Accra	2016	1	2016
Samartex	Tarkwa, Western Region	2023–24	1	2024
Bibiani Gold Stars	Bibiani, Western North	2024-2025	1	2025

== Top scorers ==
1973–2026 Ghana Premier League top scorers
Season	Best scorers	Team	Goals	Ref
1973	(Ghana) Peter Lamptey	Accra Hearts of Oak	26	
1974	(Ghana) Dan Owusu	Bofoakwa Tano	24	
1975	(Ghana) Dan Owusu	Bofoakwa Tano	26	
1976	(Ghana) Dan Owusu	Bofoakwa Tano	28	
1977	(Ghana) George Alhassan	Accra Great Olympics	—N/a	
1978	(Ghana) Muhammed Choo	Real Tamale United	22	
1979	(Ghana) Opoku Afriyie	Asante Kotoko	—N/a	
1980	(Ghana) Emmanuel Quarshie	Sekondi Hasaacas	18	
1981	(Ghana) Opoku Afriyie	Asante Kotoko	21	
1982	(Ghana) Muhammed Choo	Real Tamale United	15	
1983	(Ghana) Anane Kobo	Real Tamale United	—N/a	
1984	(Ghana) Anane Kobo	Real Tamale United	—N/a	
1985	(Ghana) George Alhassan	Accra Great Olympics	—N/a	
1986	(Ghana) Tony Yeboah	Cornerstones	—N/a	
1987	(Ghana) Tony Yeboah	Cornerstones	—N/a	
1988–89	(Ghana) Henry Acquah	Accra Hearts of Oak	—N/a	
1989–90	(Ghana) Muhammed Tijani	Cornerstones	15	
1990–91	(Ghana) Thomas Boakye	Asante Kotoko	—N/a	
1991–92	(Ghana) Abdul Mumuni	Dawu Youngstars	—N/a	
1992–93	(Ghana) Augustine Ahinful	Goldfields	12	
1993–94	(Ghana) Oscar Laud	Dawu Youngstars	—N/a	
1994–95	(Ghana) Charles Amoah	Okwawu United	—N/a	
1995–96	(Ghana) Kofi Deblah	Goldfields	—N/a	
1996–97	(Ghana) Kofi Deblah	Goldfields	—N/a	
1997–98	(Ghana) Joe Fameyeh	Accra Hearts of Oak	—N/a	
1999	(Ghana) Ishmael Addo	Accra Hearts of Oak	19	
2000	(Ghana) Ishmael Addo	Accra Hearts of Oak	21	
2001	(Ghana) Ishmael Addo	Accra Hearts of Oak	22	
2002	(Ghana) Bernard Dong Bortey; (Ghana) Charles Asampong Taylor	Accra Hearts of Oak	18	
2003	(Ghana) Shaibu Yakubu	Goldfields Obuasi	13	
2004–05	(Ghana) Samuel Yeboah	Heart of Lions	—N/a	
2005	(Ghana) Prince Tagoe	Accra Hearts of Oak	18	
2006–07	(Ghana) Emmanuel Clottey	Accra Great Olympics	14	
2007–08	(Ghana) Eric Bekoe	Asante Kotoko	17	
2008–09	(Ghana) Alex Asamoah	Asante Kotoko	16	
2009–10	(Ghana) Bismark Idan (Ghana) Samuel Afum	Kessben Accra Hearts of Oak	13	
2010–11	(Ghana) Nana Poku	Berekum Arsenal	17	
2011–12	(Ghana) Emmanuel Baffour	New Edubiase United	21	
2012–13	(Ghana) Mahatma Otoo	Accra Hearts of Oak	20	
2013–14	(Ghana) Augustine Okrah	Bechem United	16	
2015	(Ghana) Kofi Owusu	Berekum Chelsea	19	
2016	(Ghana) Latif Blessing	Liberty Professionals	14	
2017	(Ghana) Hans Kwofie	Ashanti Gold	17	
2018 (Note: Abandoned on 7 June 2018 as a result of the dissolution of the GFA owing to Anas Aremeyaw Anas' investigative documentary on the body's internal corruptive operations.)	(Ghana) Hafiz Konkoni (Ghana) Kwasi Donsu	Bechem United Medeama	8	
2019–20 (Note: Abandoned and daclared null and void as a result of the COVID-19 pandemic and its consequential impact on its football operations.)	(Niger) Victorien Adebayor	International Allies	12	
2020–21	(Ghana) Diawisie Taylor	Karela United	18	
2021–22	(Ghana) Yaw Annor	Ashanti Gold	24	
2022–23	(Ghana) Abednego Tetteh	Bibiani Gold Stars	18	
2023–24	(Ghana) Stephen Amankona	Berekum Chelsea	19	
2024–25	(Ghana) Stephen Amankona	Berekum Chelsea	15	
2025–26	(Ghana) Augustine Okrah	Bechem United	17	

== Sponsorship ==
Period	Title sponsor	Name	Ref.
1956–2008	None	Ghana Premier League	
2009–2013	Globacom (Glo)	Glo Premier League	
2013–2015	First Capital Plus Bank; (later Capital Bank)	First Capital Plus (Bank) Premier League	
2016–2022	None	Ghana Premier League	
2022–2023	betPawa	betPawa Premier League	
2023–present	None	Ghana Premier League	

== See also ==
- List of football clubs in Ghana
- Ghana Football Leagues
- Ghana Women's Premier League
