= Swedru All Blacks F.C. =

Swedru All Blacks
- Full name: Swedru All Blacks United Football Club
- Nickname: Black Magicians on the low
- Founded: 1945
- Ground: Swedru Sports Stadium; Swedru, Central Region
- Capacity: 5,000
- Chairman: Stephen Ato Quayeson
- Manager: Kassim Mingle
- League: Ghana Premier League
- 2025–26: 14th
- Website: www.swedruallblacks.com

Swedru All Blacks United Football Club is a professional football club established in the year 1945 and it is based in Swedru, Central Region, Ghana. The club currently competes in the Ghana Premier League.

Their home stadium is the Swedru Sports Stadium.

== History ==
Swedru All Blacks was established on October 25, 1945, by the late Queen-mother of Agona Swedru Nana Abena Gyimah.

The team has been playing their home games at Swedru Sports Stadium. The club is nicknamed Black Magicians, and its full name is Swedru All Blacks United Football Club. Ghanaian Businessman and Engineer Stephen Ato Quayeson is the owner of the club. Head coach of the team is Kassim Ocansey Mingle, assisted by Joe Agyemang Junior.

== Achievements ==
- SWAG Cup: 1

1997/98

== Current squad ==
as of Note: Flags indicate national team as defined under FIFA eligibility rules; some limited exceptions apply. Players may hold more than one non-FIFA nationality.

No. / Pos. / Nation / Player	No. / Pos. / Nation / Player

== Reserve squad ==
Note: Flags indicate national team as defined under FIFA eligibility rules; some limited exceptions apply. Players may hold more than one non-FIFA nationality.

No. / Pos. / Nation / Player	No. / Pos. / Nation / Player

== Staff ==
President: Stephen Ato Quayeson

Administrative Manager: Alexis Twumasi Dankwah

Director of Operations: Kweku Boamah

Brands & Communications Manager: Nathaniel Obeng

Head Coach: Kassim Ocansey Mingle
