= Henry Acquah =

Ghanaian footballer (born 1965)

Personal information
- Full name: Henry Acquah
- Date of birth: 31 August 1965 (age 61)
- Place of birth: Ghana
- Height: 1.75 m (5 ft 9 in)
- Position: Forward

Senior career*
Years	Team	Apps	(Gls)
1986–1987	Sekondi Hasaacas		
1987–1989	Hearts of Oak		
1989–1992	SC Preußen Münster	43	(7)
1992–1993	SpVgg Marl	27	(3)
1993–1995	VfB Wissen	62	(24)
1995–1996	Alemannia Aachen	23	(2)
1997–1998	Perlis FA	31	(28)
1999–2001	VfL Hamm/Sieg	38	(7)
Total		220+	(52+)

International career
1986–1988	Ghana	4	(0)
- * Club domestic league appearances and goals

Henry Acquah (born 31 August 1965) is a former Ghanaian football forward.

== Club career ==
Acquah began at Sekongi Hasaacas in 1986 and joined Hearts of Oak in 1987. He won the Ghana Premier League Top Scorer award during the 1988–89 season.

He then moved to Germany in 1989 and played with Preußen Münster in the Second Division while becoming an audience favorite. During the time he played to the descent of the club in the then third-class league Westfalen two years later and played 43 club games.

There followed several years in the lower division clubs SpVgg Marl, VfB Wissen and Alemannia Aachen. In 1997, after two seasons at the Malaysian club Perlis FA, Acquah moved back to Germany and retired after playing for VfL Hamm/Sieg between 1999 and 2001.

== International career ==
Acquah debuted for Ghana on 20 June 1986 during the 2–0 friendly loss against Iran. He also featured during the 1988 Summer Olympics qualification and the 1990 FIFA World cup qualification (CAF).

== Career statistics ==
=== International ===
Appearances and goals by national team and year
National team	Year	Apps	Goals
Ghana	1986	1	0
Ghana	1987	1	0
Ghana	1988	2	0
Total		4	0
