= Dumas Boys of GTP =

Dumas Boys
- Full name: Dumas Boys of GTP
- Ground: Tema Sports Stadium
- Capacity: 10000
- League: Ghana Football Leagues

Dumas Boys of GTP (often called as Dumas Boys) is a Ghanaian professional football club based in Tema. They are a currently competing in the Ghana Football Leagues.

In 1976 the team has won the Ghanaian FA Cup

== Honours ==
- Ghanaian FA Cup: 1976
