= Erik Sandvärn =

Swedish footballer

Personal information
- Date of birth: 4 September 1975 (age 51)
- Place of birth: Sweden
- Height: 1.83 m (6 ft 0 in)
- Position: Defender

Senior career*
Years	Team	Apps	(Gls)
1991	IFK Luleå		
1992–2001	Umeå FC	145	(2)
2003	Alta IF	28	(1)
2004–2007	IFK Mariehamn	81	(6)
2008–2009	Umeå FC	40	(1)
Total		294	(10)
- * Club domestic league appearances and goals

Erik Sandvärn (born 4 September 1975) is a Swedish former footballer who played as a central defender. He played for clubs including the Ålandic club IFK Mariehamn in the Finnish Premier Division (Veikkausliiga).

Sandvärn is from Umeå and has got several caps for the official Sami national team.

Erik has played three seasons in IFK Mariehamn, one season in Ykkönen and two in Veikkausliiga. He has become one of the favourite players among the supporters of the club. He is also the first player in IFK Mariehamn to have scored a goal in Veikkausliiga. He joined IFK Mariehamn from Alta IF in Norway.
