= Joe Fameyeh =

Ghanaian former footballer

Personal information
- Full name: Joseph Fameyeh
- Date of birth: 19 October 1978 (age 48)
- Place of birth: Tema, Ghana
- Height: 1.70 m (5 ft 7 in)
- Position: Forward

Senior career*
Years	Team	Apps	(Gls)
1993–1997	Afienya United		
1997–2000	Accra Hearts of Oak		(7+)
2000–2009	TSV Crailsheim	174+	(104+)
2010–2013	FSV Hollenbach	70	(26)
2014–2015	SSV Stimpfach		

International career^{‡}
1997	Ghana	2	(0)
- * Club domestic league appearances and goals as of 8 January 2022 ‡ National team caps and goals as of 8 January 2022

Joe Fameyeh (born 19 October 1978) is a Ghanaian former footballer who played as a striker.

Starting his career in a smaller club, he joined Accra Hearts of Oak in 1997. In the same year, he featured for Ghana in two friendly losses. In 1999 he became top goalscorer of the Ghana Premier League. He had trials with European clubs, including Vålerenga in 1996. In 2000 he moved to German sixth-tier club TSV Crailsheim, securing promotion to the fourth tier where he became a prolific goalscorer. He surpassed 20 goals in several seasons.
