= Stephen Amankona =

Ghanaian footballer (born 2000)

Personal information
- Date of birth: 30 March 2000 (age 26)
- Place of birth: Ghana
- Position: Attacking midfielder

Team information
- Current team: Smouha

Senior career*
Years	Team	Apps	(Gls)
2016–2020	Berekum Chelsea	90	(25)
2021–2022	Asante Kotoko	22	(1)
2023–2025	Berekum Chelsea	67	(36)
2025–	Smouha	0	(0)
- * Club domestic league appearances and goals as of 15:10, 13 July 2021 (UTC)

Stephen Amankona (born 30 March 2000) is a Ghanaian professional footballer who plays as a forward or attacking midfielder for Smouha in the Egyptian Premier League. He is noted for being a consistent goal scorer in domestic football and has won the league's Golden Boot in consecutive seasons (2023–24 and 2024–25).

== Club career ==
=== Berekum Chelsea (first spell) ===
Amankona began his professional career with Berekum Chelsea, where he impressed as an attacker. In the 2020–21 Ghana Premier League season, he scored 10 goals in 28 league appearances and also featured in the Ghana FA Cup, helping his club reach the semi-final stage.

=== Asante Kotoko ===
In October 2021, Amankona signed for Asante Kotoko. He struggled to cement a starting role during his spell at the club and eventually departed after limited appearances.

=== Return to Berekum Chelsea ===
Amankona rejoined Berekum Chelsea in January 2023. He quickly re-established himself as one of the league's top forwards, scoring consistently and becoming a leading figure in the squad.

== Achievements ==
In the 2023–24 Ghana Premier League season, Amankona finished as the league's top scorer with 19 goals in 29 appearances. He retained the Golden Boot in the 2024–25 season, scoring 15 goals.

In April 2025, Amankona was named the NASCO Player of the Month for March after scoring five goals and providing two assists in four matches, including a hat-trick against Accra Lions and registering multiple match-winning performances.

== Style of play ==
Amankona plays as a forward or attacking midfielder. He is known for his finishing ability, movement in attacking positions, and consistency in front of goal.

== Honours ==
Asante Kotoko

- Ghana Premier League: 2021–22

Individual

- Ghana Premier League Golden Boot: 2023–24, 2024–25
- Ghana Premier League Player of the Month: March 2025
