= Alex Asamoah =

Ghanaian footballer

Personal information
- Date of birth: 16 January 1986 (age 40)
- Place of birth: Kumasi, Ghana
- Height: 1.78 m (5 ft 10 in)
- Position: Striker

Youth career
- Berekum Arsenal

Senior career*
Years	Team	Apps	(Gls)
2002–2005	Berekum Arsenal	92	(34)
2005–2008	Ashanti Gold SC	31	(3)
2008–2010	Asante Kotoko	27	(16)
2010	→ Gyeongnam FC (loan)	2	(0)
2011	ES Sétif	2	(0)
2012	Ashanti Gold SC	16	(1)
2012–	Aduana Stars		
- * Club domestic league appearances and goals

Alexander Jeffrey Obiri Asamoah Gyimah (born January 16, 1986) is a Ghanaian footballer who plays for Aduana Stars.

== Club career ==
On 7 December 2005 left Berekum Arsenal to sign a two-year contract for Ashanti Gold SC and on 17 January 2009 signed for Asante Kotoko.

On 17 March 2010 the Asante Kotoko attacker and top scorer of the 2008/2009 season, changes with immediate effect to South Korean K-League side Gyeongnam FC. The 24-year-old Ghanaian signed with the Changwon-based club, a one-year loan contract and returned on 3 August 2010 to Asante Kotoko.

On December 1, 2011, ES Sétif announced that they had reached a mutual agreement to terminate Asamoah's contract. He spent just four months at the club, making two appearances. He returned in January 2012 to Ashanti Gold SC, before signing for Aduana Stars im September 2012.

On 12 March 2021, the veteran striker joined Techiman based club, Techiman Eleven Wonders in the Ghana Premier League on a one-year deal.

It will be the second stint with Techiman Eleven Wonders after first joining in 2017 and leaving after 2 seasons [7]

=== Position ===
Asamoah played as an attacking midfielder or striker

== International career ==
He earned his first call up for his homeland on 4 December 2008.

== Honours ==
Asante Kotoko

- Ghana Premier League: 2008–09
- Ghana Premier League top scorer with 16 goals: 2008–09
