= 2024–25 CAF Champions League =

61st season of the CAF Champions League

TotalEnergies CAF Champions League 2024–2025
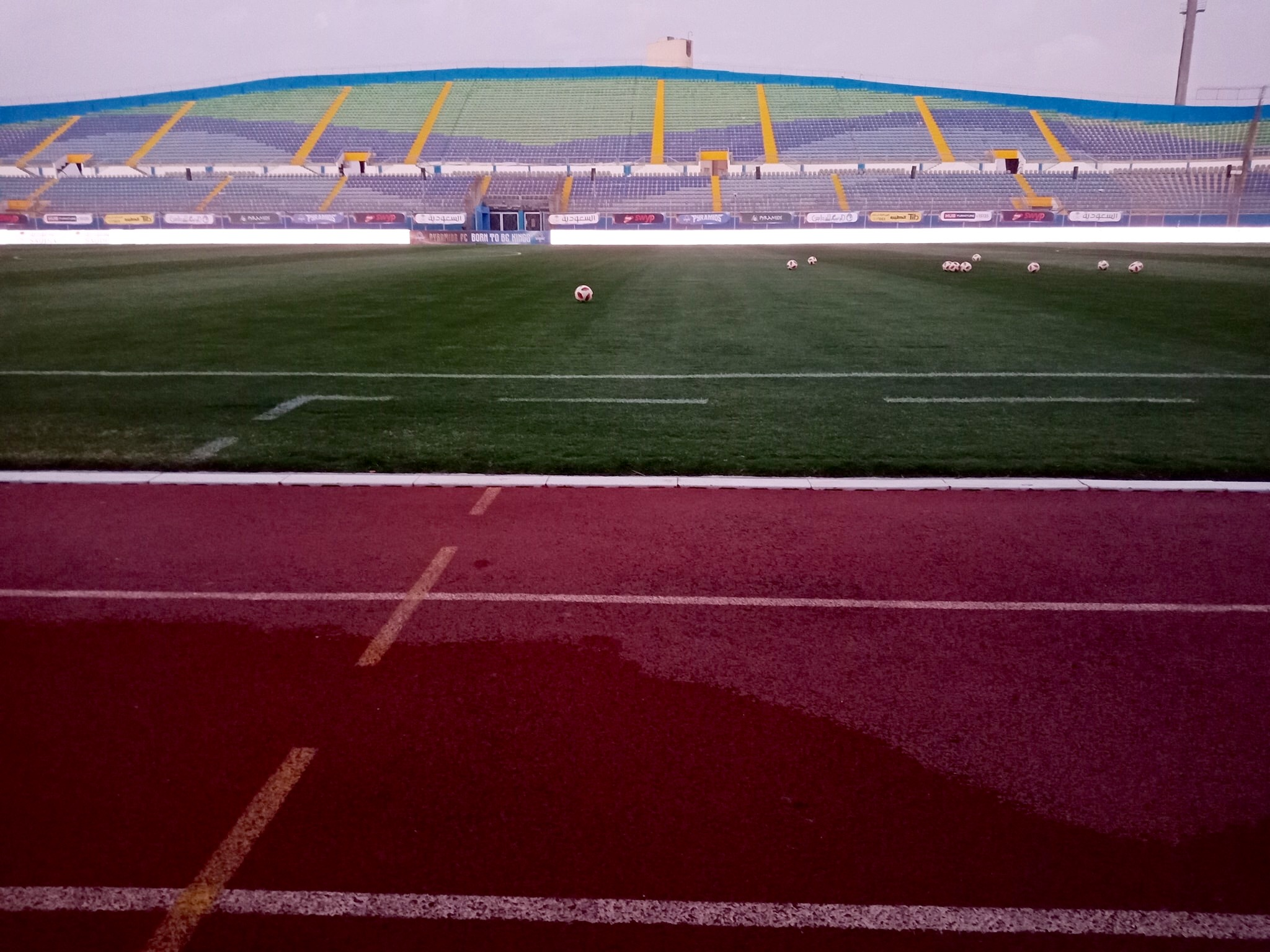
- 30 June Stadium in Cairo hosted the second leg of the final round

Tournament details
- Dates: Qualification: 16 August – 22 September 2024; Competition proper: 26 November 2024 – 1 June 2025
- Teams: 59 (from 47 associations)

Final positions
- Champions: (Egypt) Pyramids (1st title)
- Runners-up: (South Africa) Mamelodi Sundowns

Tournament statistics
- Matches played: 62
- Goals scored: 133 (2.15 per match)
- Top scorer: (Democratic Republic of the Congo) Fiston Mayele (6 goals)
- (Note: All statistics do not include qualifying play-offs)

The 2024–25 CAF Champions League, officially the TotalEnergies CAF Champions League for sponsorship reasons, was the 61st season of Africa's premier club football tournament organized by the Confederation of African Football (CAF) and the 29th under the CAF Champions League title.

The winners of this edition of the competition, Pyramids, automatically qualified for the group stage of its next edition, earned the right to play against the winners of the 2024–25 CAF Confederation Cup in the 2025 CAF Super Cup, the 2025 FIFA Intercontinental Cup and the 2029 FIFA Club World Cup.

== Association team allocation ==
All 54 CAF member associations may enter the CAF Champions League, with the 12 highest ranked associations according to the CAF 5-year ranking eligible to enter two teams in the competition. As a result, a maximum of 68 teams could enter the tournament – although this level has never been reached.

For this season's edition, CAF used the 2019–2024 CAF 5-year ranking, which calculates points for each entrant association based on their clubs performance over the 5 years in the CAF Champions League and the CAF Confederation Cup. The criteria for the points are as follows:

	CAF Champions League	CAF Confederation Cup
Winners	6 points	5 points
Runners-up	5 points	4 points
Losing semi-finalists	4 points	3 points
Losing quarter-finalists	3 points	2 points
3rd place in groups	2 points	1 point
4th place in groups	1 point	0.5 point

The points were multiplied by a coefficient according to the season as follows:

- 2023–24: × 5
- 2022–23: × 4
- 2021–22: × 3
- 2020–21: × 2
- 2019–20: × 1

== Teams ==
The following 59 teams from 47 associations entered the competition.

- Bold received a bye to the second round.
- The other teams entered the first round.

Associations are shown according to their CAF 5-year ranking – those with a ranking score have their rank and score (in parentheses) indicated.

Associations eligible to enter two teams (Top 12 associations)
Association	Rank (Pts)	Team	Qualifying method
Egypt	1 (184)	Al Ahly	2023–24 CAF Champions League champions 2023–24 Egyptian Premier League champions
Egypt	1 (184)	Pyramids	2023–24 Egyptian Premier League runners-up
Morocco	2 (148)	Raja CA	2023–24 Botola champions
Morocco	2 (148)	AS FAR	2023–24 Botola runners-up
Algeria	3 (119)	MC Alger	2023–24 Algerian Ligue Professionnelle 1 champions
Algeria	3 (119)	CR Belouizdad	2023–24 Algerian Ligue Professionnelle 1 runners-up
South Africa	4 (106)	Mamelodi Sundowns	2023–24 South African Premier Division champions
South Africa	4 (106)	Orlando Pirates	2023–24 South African Premier Division runners-up
Tunisia	5 (97)	Espérance de Tunis	2023–24 Tunisian Ligue Professionnelle 1 champions
Tunisia	5 (97)	US Monastir	2023–24 Tunisian Ligue Professionnelle 1 runners-up
Tanzania	6 (71)	Young Africans	2023–24 Tanzanian Premier League champions
Tanzania	6 (71)	Azam	2023–24 Tanzanian Premier League runners-up
DR Congo	7 (54)	TP Mazembe	2023–24 Linafoot champions
DR Congo	7 (54)	AS Maniema Union	2023–24 Linafoot runners-up
Angola	8 (51.5)	Petro de Luanda	2023–24 Girabola champions
Angola	8 (51.5)	Sagrada Esperança	2023–24 Girabola runners-up
Sudan	9 (37)	Al Hilal	2023–24 Sudan Premier League champions
Sudan	9 (37)	Al Merrikh	2023–24 Sudan Premier League runners-up
Libya	10 (35)	Al Nasr	2023–24 Libyan Premier League champions
Libya	10 (35)	Al Ahly Benghazi	2023–24 Libyan Premier League runners-up
Ivory Coast	11 (30.5)	San Pédro	2023–24 Côte d'Ivoire Ligue 1 champions
Ivory Coast	11 (30.5)	Stade d'Abidjan	2023–24 Côte d'Ivoire Ligue 1 runners-up
Nigeria	12 (25)	Enugu Rangers	2023-24 Nigeria Premier Football League champions
Nigeria	12 (25)	Remo Stars	2023-24 Nigeria Premier Football League runners-up

Associations eligible to enter one team
Association	Rank (Pts)	Team	Qualifying method
Guinea	13 (20.5)	Milo	2023–24 Guinée Championnat National champions
Ghana	14 (20)	Samartex	2023–24 Ghana Premier League champions
Mali	15 (15)	Djoliba	2023–24 Malian Première Division champions
Cameroon	16 (11.5)	Victoria United	2023–24 Elite One champions
Mauritania	17 (10.5)	FC Nouadhibou	2023–24 Super D1 champions
Congo	18 (9.5)	AC Léopards	2024 Congo Ligue 1 champions
Botswana	19 (8)	Jwaneng Galaxy	2023–24 Botswana Premier League champions
Zambia	20 (7.5)	Red Arrows	2023–24 Zambia Super League champions
Senegal	21 (6)	Teungueth	2023–24 Senegal Premier League champions
Togo	T-22 (4)	ASKO Kara	2023–24 Togolese Championnat National champions
Uganda	T-22 (4)	SC Villa	2023–24 Uganda Premier League champions
Eswatini	T-24 (1.5)	Mbabane Swallows	2023–24 Eswatini Premier League champions
Niger	T-24 (1.5)	AS GNN	2023–24 Niger Premier League champions
Burkina Faso	T-26 (1)	AS Douanes	2023–24 Burkinabé Premier League champions
Zimbabwe	T-26 (1)	Ngezi Platinum	2023 Zimbabwe Premier Soccer League champions
Benin	28 (0.5)	Coton FC	2023–24 Benin Premier League champions
Burundi	—	Vital'O	2023–24 Burundi Premier League champions
Central African Republic	—	Red Star de Bangui	2023–24 Central African Republic League runners-up
Chad	—	AS PSI	2024 Chad Premier League champions
Comoros	—	US Zilimadjou	2024 Comoros Premier League champions
Djibouti	—	Arta Solar	2023–24 Djibouti Premier League champions
Equatorial Guinea	—	Deportivo Mongomo	2023–24 Equatoguinean Primera División champions
Ethiopia	—	CBE	2023–24 Ethiopian Premier League champions
Kenya	—	Gor Mahia	2023–24 FKF Premier League champions
Liberia	—	Watanga	2023–24 Liberian First Division champions
Madagascar	—	Disciples FC	2023–24 Malagasy Pro League champions
Malawi	—	Nyasa Big Bullets	2023–24 Super League of Malawi champions
Mozambique	—	Ferroviário da Beira	2023 Moçambola champions
Namibia	—	African Stars	2023–24 Namibia Premier Football League champions
Rwanda	—	APR	2023–24 Rwanda Premier League champions
Seychelles	—	Saint Louis Suns United	2024 Seychelles Premier League champions
Sierra Leone	—	Bo Rangers	2024 Sierra Leone National Premier League champions
Somalia	—	Dekedaha	2023–24 Somali First Division champions
South Sudan	—	Al Merreikh Bentiu	2024 South Sudan Football Championship champions
Zanzibar	—	JKU	2023–24 Zanzibar Premier League champions

Associations which did not enter a team

- Cape Verde
- Eritrea
- Gabon
- Gambia
- Guinea-Bissau
- Lesotho
- Mauritius
- Réunion
- São Tomé and Príncipe

Notes

1. The Libyan Premier League was not finished by the CAF deadline for associations to submit teams participating in this season's CAF competitions. CAF approved a request made by the Libyan Football Federation to submit the names of participating teams in the competition following the end of the season by 22 July 2024, and as a result, Libyan teams were listed as Libya 1 and Libya 2 during the draw; as their identity was still unknown by the time of the draw.

== Schedule ==
The schedule of the qualifying tournament was as follows.

Phase	Round	Draw date	First leg	Second leg
Qualifying rounds	First round	11 July 2024	16–18 August 2024	23–25 August 2024
Qualifying rounds	Second round	11 July 2024	13–15 September 2024	20–22 September 2024
Group stage	Matchday 1	7 October 2024	26–27 November 2024	
Group stage	Matchday 2	7 October 2024	6–7 December 2024	
Group stage	Matchday 3	7 October 2024	13–14 December 2024	
Group stage	Matchday 4	7 October 2024	3–4 January 2025	
Group stage	Matchday 5	7 October 2024	10–11 January 2025	
Group stage	Matchday 6	7 October 2024	17–18 January 2025	
Knockout stage	Quarter-finals	20 February 2025	1–2 April 2025	8–9 April 2025
Knockout stage	Semi-finals	20 February 2025	18–19 April 2025	25–26 April 2025
Knockout stage	Final	20 February 2025	24 May 2025	1 June 2025

== Qualifying rounds ==
The draw for the qualifying rounds was held on 11 July 2024, 12:00 GMT (15:00 local time, UTC+3), at the CAF headquarters in Cairo, Egypt. In the qualifying rounds, each tie was played on a home-and-away two-legged basis. If the aggregate score was tied after the second leg, the away goals rule was applied, and if still tied, extra time was not played, and a penalty shoot-out was used to determine the winner (Regulations III. 13 & 14).

=== First round ===
Team 1	Agg.	Team 2	1st leg	2nd leg
El Merriekh Bentiu (South Sudan)	2–5	(Kenya) Gor Mahia	1–0	1–5
Arta Solar (Djibouti)	4–5	(Somalia) Dekedaha	0–2	4–3
SC Villa (Uganda)	2–3	(Ethiopia) CBE	1–2	1–1
Vital'O (Burundi)	0–10	(Tanzania) Young Africans	0–4	0–6
Azam (Tanzania)	1–2	(Rwanda) APR	1–0	0–2
JKU (Zanzibar)	1–9	(Egypt) Pyramids	0–6	1–3
Mbabane Swallows (Eswatini)	1–0	(Mozambique) Ferroviário da Beira	1–0	0–0
Ngezi Platinum (Zimbabwe)	0–0 (3–4 p)	(Democratic Republic of the Congo) AS Maniema Union	0–0	0–0
Nyasa Big Bullets (Malawi)	2–3	(Zambia) Red Arrows	2–1	0–2
African Stars (Namibia)	1–1 (5–6 p)	(Botswana) Jwaneng Galaxy	1–0	0–1
Disciples FC (Madagascar)	0–4	(South Africa) Orlando Pirates	0–0	0–4
US Zilimadjou (Comoros)	1–2	(Nigeria) Enugu Rangers	0–1	1–1
Saint Louis Suns United (Seychelles)	0–4	(Angola) Sagrada Esperança	0–1	0–3
AS Douanes (Burkina Faso)	1–1 (a)	(Benin) Coton FC	0–0	1–1
AC Léopards (Republic of the Congo)	0–3	(Algeria) CR Belouizdad	0–2	0–1
Victoria United (Cameroon)	0–2	(Ghana) Samartex	0–1	0–1
AS GNN (Niger)	1–7	(Morocco) Raja CA	1–2	0–5
AS PSI (Chad)	0–3	(Tunisia) US Monastir	0–1	0–2
Watanga (Liberia)	0–4	(Algeria) MC Alger	0–2	0–2
Red Star de Bangui (Central African Republic)	w/o (Note: Djoliba won on a walkover after Red Star de Bangui withdrew from the competition citing financial reasons.)	(Mali) Djoliba	0–0	—
Deportivo Mongomo (Equatorial Guinea)	2–3	(Togo) ASKO Kara	2–2	0–1
Stade d'Abidjan (Ivory Coast)	2–2 (5–4 p)	(Senegal) Teungueth	1–1	1–1
Milo (Guinea)	1–1 (a)	(Mauritania) FC Nouadhibou	0–0	1–1
Bo Rangers (Sierra Leone)	1–2	(Ivory Coast) San Pédro	1–1	0–1
Al Ahly Benghazi (Libya)	1–2	(Sudan) Al Hilal	0–1	1–1
Al Nasr (Libya)	0–2	(Sudan) Al Merrikh	0–0	0–2
Remo Stars (Nigeria)	2–3	(Morocco) AS FAR	2–1	0–2

=== Second round ===
The 16 winners of the second round advanced to the group stage.

Team 1	Agg.	Team 2	1st leg	2nd leg
Gor Mahia (Kenya)	0–6	(Egypt) Al Ahly	0–3	0–3
Dekedaha (Somalia)	1–12	(Tunisia) Espérance de Tunis	1–4	0–8
CBE (Ethiopia)	0–7	(Tanzania) Young Africans	0–1	0–6
APR (Rwanda)	2–4	(Egypt) Pyramids	1–1	1–3
Mbabane Swallows (Eswatini)	0–8	(South Africa) Mamelodi Sundowns	0–4	0–4
AS Maniema Union (Democratic Republic of the Congo)	2–1	(Angola) Petro de Luanda	2–1	0–0
Red Arrows (Zambia)	1–4	(Democratic Republic of the Congo) TP Mazembe	0–2	1–2
Jwaneng Galaxy (Botswana)	0–3	(South Africa) Orlando Pirates	0–2	0–1
Enugu Rangers (Nigeria)	2–3	(Angola) Sagrada Esperança	1–0	1–3
AS Douanes (Burkina Faso)	1–1 (3–4 p)	(Algeria) CR Belouizdad	1–0	0–1
Samartex (Ghana)	2–4	(Morocco) Raja CA	2–2	0–2
US Monastir (Tunisia)	1–2	(Algeria) MC Alger	1–0	0–2
Djoliba (Mali)	2–0	(Togo) ASKO Kara	1–0	1–0
Stade d'Abidjan (Ivory Coast)	3–2	(Guinea) Milo	2–0	1–2
San Pédro (Ivory Coast)	2–3	(Sudan) Al Hilal	2–2	0–1
Al Merrikh (Sudan)	2–4	(Morocco) AS FAR	2–2	0–2

== Group stage ==
Location of the 2024–25 CAF Champions League group stage teams

The draw for the group stage was held on 7 October 2024, 11:00 GMT (14:00 local time, UTC+3), in Cairo, Egypt. The 16 winners of the second round of qualifying rounds were drawn into four groups of four.

The teams were seeded by their performances in the CAF competitions for the previous five seasons (CAF 5-year ranking points shown next to every team). Each group contained one team from each of Pot 1, Pot 2, Pot 3, and Pot 4, and each team were allocated to the positions in their group according to their pot. In the group stage, each group was played on a home-and-away round-robin basis. The winners and runners-up of each group advanced to the quarter-finals of the knockout stage.

Pot 1
Team	Pts
(Egypt) Al Ahly	87
(Tunisia) Espérance de Tunis	61
(South Africa) Mamelodi Sundowns	54
(Democratic Republic of the Congo) TP Mazembe	38

Pot 2
Team	Pts
(Algeria) CR Belouizdad	37
(Morocco) Raja CA	35
(Tanzania) Young Africans	31
(Egypt) Pyramids	29

Pot 3
Team	Pts
(Sudan) Al Hilal	25
(South Africa) Orlando Pirates	16
(Angola) Sagrada Esperança	8
(Morocco) AS FAR	8

Pot 4
Team	Pts
(Algeria) MC Alger	6
(Mali) Djoliba	1
(Democratic Republic of the Congo) AS Maniema Union	—
(Ivory Coast) Stade d'Abidjan	—

=== Group A ===
Pos	Team	Pld	W	D	L	GF	GA	GD	Pts	Qualification	HIL	MCA	YNG	TPM
1	(Sudan) Al Hilal	6	3	1	2	6	7	−1	10	Advance to knockout stage	—	1–1	0–1	2–1
2	(Algeria) MC Alger	6	2	3	1	4	2	+2	9	Advance to knockout stage	0–1	—	2–0	1–0
3	(Tanzania) Young Africans	6	2	2	2	5	6	−1	8		0–2	0–0	—	3–1
4	(Democratic Republic of the Congo) TP Mazembe	6	1	2	3	7	7	0	5		4–0	0–0	1–1	—

Source: CAF

=== Group B ===
Pos	Team	Pld	W	D	L	GF	GA	GD	Pts	Qualification	FAR	MSFC	RCA	MUN
1	(Morocco) AS FAR	6	2	4	0	8	4	+4	10	Advance to knockout stage	—	1–1	1–1	2–0
2	(South Africa) Mamelodi Sundowns	6	2	3	1	5	4	+1	9	Advance to knockout stage	1–1	—	1–0	0–0
3	(Morocco) Raja CA	6	2	2	2	4	5	−1	8		0–2	1–0	—	1–0
4	(Democratic Republic of the Congo) AS Maniema Union	6	0	3	3	3	7	−4	3		1–1	1–2	1–1	—

Source: CAF

=== Group C ===
Pos	Team	Pld	W	D	L	GF	GA	GD	Pts	Qualification	OPFC	AHL	CRB	SAB
1	(South Africa) Orlando Pirates	6	4	2	0	10	4	+6	14	Advance to knockout stage	—	0–0	2–1	3–0
2	(Egypt) Al Ahly	6	3	1	2	14	7	+7	10	Advance to knockout stage	1–2	—	6–1	4–2
3	(Algeria) CR Belouizdad	6	3	0	3	11	10	+1	9		1–2	1–0	—	6–0
4	(Ivory Coast) Stade d'Abidjan	6	0	1	5	4	18	−14	1		1–1	1–3	0–1	—

Source: CAF

=== Group D ===
Pos	Team	Pld	W	D	L	GF	GA	GD	Pts	Qualification	EST	PYR	GDSE	DJO
1	(Tunisia) Espérance de Tunis	6	4	1	1	12	3	+9	13 (Note: Ranked on goal difference in head-to-head matches: Espérance de Tunis +1, Pyramids –1.)	Advance to knockout stage	—	2–0	4–1	4–0
2	(Egypt) Pyramids	6	4	1	1	14	4	+10	13	Advance to knockout stage	2–1	—	5–1	6–0
3	(Angola) Sagrada Esperança	6	1	2	3	3	10	−7	5		0–0	0–1	—	1–0
4	(Mali) Djoliba	6	0	2	4	0	12	−12	2		0–1	0–0	0–0	—

Source: CAF

== Knockout stage ==
The mechanism of the draws for each round was as follows:

- In the draw for the quarter-finals, the four group winners were seeded, and the four group runners-up were unseeded. The seeded teams were drawn against the unseeded teams, with the seeded teams hosting the second leg. Teams from the same group could not be drawn against each other, while teams from the same association could be drawn against each other.
- In the draws for the semi-finals, there were no seedings, and teams from the same group or the same association could be drawn against each other. As the draws for the quarter-finals and semi-finals were held together before the quarter-finals were played, the identity of the quarter-final winners was not known at the time of the semi-final draw.

Group	Winners	Runners-up
A	(Sudan) Al Hilal	(Algeria) MC Alger
B	(Morocco) AS FAR	(South Africa) Mamelodi Sundowns
C	(South Africa) Orlando Pirates	(Egypt) Al Ahly
D	(Tunisia) Espérance de Tunis	(Egypt) Pyramids

=== Bracket ===
The bracket was decided after the draw for the knockout stage, which was held on 20 February 2025, 18:00 AST (UTC+3) at the beIN Sports headquarters in Doha, Qatar.

Quarter-finals
(South Africa) Mamelodi Sundowns	1	0	1
(Tunisia) Espérance de Tunis	0	0	0
(Egypt) Al Ahly	1	1	2
(Sudan) Al Hilal	0	0	0
(Algeria) MC Alger	0	0	0
(South Africa) Orlando Pirates	1	0	1
(Egypt) Pyramids	4	0	4
(Morocco) AS FAR	1	2	3

Semi-finals
(South Africa) Mamelodi Sundowns (a)	0	1	1
(Egypt) Al Ahly	0	1	1
(South Africa) Orlando Pirates	0	2	2
(Egypt) Pyramids	0	3	3

Final
(South Africa) Mamelodi Sundowns	1	1	2
(Egypt) Pyramids	1	2	3

=== Quarter-finals ===
Team 1	Agg.	Team 2	1st leg	2nd leg
Al Ahly (Egypt)	2–0	(Sudan) Al Hilal	1–0	1–0
Pyramids (Egypt)	4–3	(Morocco) AS FAR	4–1	0–2
Mamelodi Sundowns (South Africa)	1–0	(Tunisia) Espérance de Tunis	1–0	0–0
MC Alger (Algeria)	0–1	(South Africa) Orlando Pirates	0–1	0–0

=== Semi-finals ===
Team 1	Agg.	Team 2	1st leg	2nd leg
Mamelodi Sundowns (South Africa)	1–1 (a)	(Egypt) Al Ahly	0–0	1–1
Orlando Pirates (South Africa)	2–3	(Egypt) Pyramids	0–0	2–3

=== Final ===
The first leg was played on 24 May, and the second leg was played on 1 June 2025.

Team 1	Agg.	Team 2	1st leg	2nd leg
Mamelodi Sundowns (South Africa)	2–3	(Egypt) Pyramids	1–1	1–2

24 May 2025
15:00 UTC+2

Mamelodi Sundowns (South Africa)	1–1	(Egypt) Pyramids
Ribeiro 54'	Report	El Karti 90+4'

Loftus Versfeld Stadium, Pretoria
Attendance: 50,000
Referee: Mahmood Ismail (Sudan)
1 June 2025
20:00 UTC+3

Pyramids (Egypt)	2–1	(South Africa) Mamelodi Sundowns
Mayele 23'; Samy 56'	Report	Rayners 75'

30 June Stadium, Cairo
Attendance: 25,000
Referee: Omar Abdulkadir Artan (Somalia)

Pyramids won 3–2 on aggregate.

== Top goalscorers ==
Team eliminated / inactive for this round.

Rank	Player	Team	MD1	MD2	MD3	MD4	MD5	MD6	QF1	QF2	SF1	SF2	F1	F2	Total
1	(Democratic Republic of the Congo) Fiston Mayele	(Egypt) Pyramids	1						2			2		1	6
2	(Egypt) Ibrahim Adel	(Egypt) Pyramids	2			1			2						5
2	(Egypt) Emam Ashour	(Egypt) Al Ahly			1		3			1					5
4	(South Africa) Relebohile Mofokeng	(South Africa) Orlando Pirates				1	1	1				1			4
4	(South Africa) Mohau Nkota	(South Africa) Orlando Pirates	2						1			1			4

== See also ==
- 2024–25 CAF Confederation Cup
- 2024 CAF Women's Champions League
- 2025 CAF Super Cup
