= Samuel Afum =

Ghanaian footballer

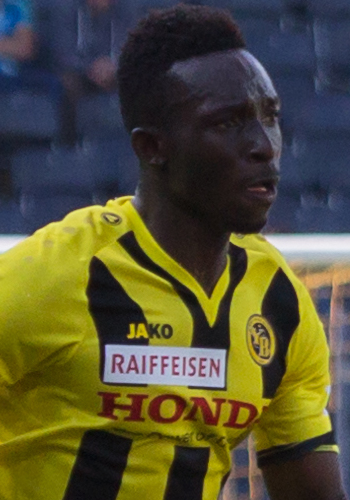
- Afum with Young Boys in 2014

Personal information
- Full name: Samuel Afum
- Date of birth: 6 December 1990 (age 35)
- Place of birth: Accra, Greater Accra, Ghana
- Height: 1.80 m (5 ft 11 in)
- Position: Forward

Senior career*
Years	Team	Apps	(Gls)
2009–2010	Hearts of Oak		
2010–2013	Smouha	45	(14)
2013–2016	Young Boys	82	(11)
2016–2018	Wadi Degla	26	(4)
2018	Spartak Subotica	3	(0)
2019	Ilves	2	(0)
- * Club domestic league appearances and goals as of 19:32, 11 July 2019 (UTC)

Samuel Afum (born 24 December 1990) is a Ghanaian footballer who plays as a forward.

== Career ==
In Ghana he played for Hearts of Oak. In the 2009–10 season he was Ghana Premier League joint top scorer with 13 goals.

In the following season he signed for Egyptian newly promoted side Smouha Sporting Club. In his second season with the club, he scored 7 goals, making him topscorer of Smouha, before the cancellation of the Egyptian Premier League. He was also the eleventh top-scorer in the Egyptian League in 2012.

In January 2013 he was transferred to Swiss club Young Boys for an undisclosed fee.

Afum then played for Egyptian side Wadi Degla.

In July 2018 he returned to Europe this time by signing with Serbian side FK Spartak Subotica. In December 2018, Afum was signed by FC Ilves. His departure from the club was announced at the end of June 2019, after getting his contract terminated by mutual consent.

== Honours ==
Joint-topscorer in the Ghanaian Premier League in 2009–10 with 13 goals.
