= Muhammed Choo =

Ghanaian footballer and manager

Personal information
- Full name: Muhammed Abdulai
- Place of birth: Ghana
- Position: Striker

Senior career*
Years	Team	Apps	(Gls)
1975–1994	Real Tamale United		(60)

International career
- Ghana
- * Club domestic league appearances and goals

Muhammed "Choo" Abdulai, also known as Alhaji Choo, is a Ghanaian professional football coach and former player. He played mostly as a striker for Real Tamale United during his playing days. He won the Ghana Premier League top goal scorer on two occasions.

== Playing career ==
Choo played as a striker in the Ghana Premier League for Real Tamale United from 1975 to 1994, a club based in the Northern Ghana, known for producing stars like Abedi Pele and Mohammed Gargo. During the latter part of his career in the 1990s, Gargo played him. He won the Ghana Premier League top goal scorer award two times in 1978 and 1982 after scoring 22 goals and 15 goals respectively.

== International career ==
Choo played for the Ghana national team in the 1970s and 1980s, however injuries hampered his ability to perform at the national team level. In a match against Tunisia in February 1980, he played alongside players including Joe Carr, Papa Arko, Opoku Afriyie, Offei Ansah, Willie Klutse and Adolf Armah when Ghana scored their Tunisian counterparts 4–1.

== Coaching career ==
As at November 2020, he was serving as the striker's coach for his former club Real Tamale United. He is a key member of the Old players Association (PFAG) Northern Region Chapter.

== Honours ==
=== Individual ===
- Ghana Premier League Top scorer: 1978, 1982
