= Swedru Sports Stadium =

Sports venue in Swedru, Ghana

Swedru Sports Stadium is a multi-use stadium in Swedru, Ghana. It used mostly for football matches and is the home stadium of All Blacks FC. The stadium holds 5,000 people. On 17th June,2023, the GFA president Kurt Edwin Simeon -Okraku officially commissioned the Swedru sports stadium borehole facility.
