= Dawu Youngstars F.C. =

Dawu Youngstars
- Full name: Dawu Youngstars FC
- Founded: 1987
- Ground: Dawu Sports Stadium, Dawu
- Capacity: 10,000
- Chairman: Seth Yeboah
- 2002: 15th

Dawu Youngstars are a now defunct Ghanaian association football team from Dawu, a small town in the eastern region of Ghana who were founded in 1987. The club last competed in the Ghanaian Premier League in 2002, but financial problems after relegation that season have meant the club has not since returned to Ghana's top flight.

== History ==
Dawu Youngstars was founded in 1987 by Seth Yeboah, a businessman from Dawu. Yeboah became the club's owner, and later built the team the Dawu Sports Stadium to play in, which has a capacity of 10,000. Dawu quickly rose to prominence in the Ghanaian leagues, reaching the Premier League in the 1990/91 season, just three years into the club's existence. Youngstars' success continued with qualification for the 1992 West African Club Championship, although they were later disqualified from the competition. Dawu stayed in the Ghanaian Premier League until 2002, frequently finishing in the top five of the league. However, the club was relegated in the 2002 season after finishing second-bottom in the league.

This relegation ended a 12-year stay in the top flight, and it looks unlikely that the club will return to the Premier League in the near future due to financial difficulties.

Normally, a club relegated from the Ghanaian Premier League would automatically drop into the First Division, but Dawu's financial plight meant they could not raise sufficient funds to compete in the First Division in 2003 and were replaced by Maamobi Mitdyland, with the Youngstars dropping to the Second Division instead.

Dawu have twice had the league's top scorers, namely Ghanaians Abdul Mumuni in 1991/92 and Laud Oscar in 1993/94. However, these are the club's only honours as they have never won the Ghanaian Premier League or Ghanaian FA Cup.

In October 2010, Youngstars founder Seth Yeboah stated that he wanted to revive the club to provide employment for young people in Dawu.

== Performance in domestic competitions ==
=== UFOA Cup 1992 ===
Dawu qualified for the 1992 West African Club Championship just five years after they had been founded. In the 5th round, Dawu came up against Asemap FC of Benin. A 2–0 win in the first leg and a 2–1 win in the second leg gave the Youngstars an aggregate 4–1 win and they should have progressed to the next round. However, Dawu were then disqualified and their place in the quarter-finals was taken by Asemap FC, who went on to reach the semi-finals, only being eliminated on penalties by Hafia FC of Guinea.

=== Ghanaian Premier League Record 1990/91 ===
Position	Club	Points	Games won	Games lost	Games drawn
1	Asante Kotoko	44	18	4	8
2	Hearts of Oak	37	14	7	9
3	Great Olympics	35	12	7	11
4	Real Tamale United	34	12	8	10
5	Dawu Youngstars	33	8	5	17
6	Okwahu United	32	8	6	16
7	Goldfields SC	29	8	9	13
8	Brong Ahafo United	28	10	12	8
9	Afienya United	28	10	12	8
10	VORADEP Ho	28	7	9	14

NB: Table only shows 10/16 teams to focus on Dawu Youngstars

Dawu managed to secure an impressive 5th place in the Ghanaian Premier League just three years after their formation. The club only finished four points behind 2nd-placed Accra Hearts of Oak, the biggest club in the country.

=== Ghanaian Premier League Record 1991/92 ===
Position	Club	Points	Games won	Games lost	Games drawn
1	Asante Kotoko	40	17	3	6
2	Hearts of Oak	37	16	5	5
3	Goldfields SC	33	11	4	11
4	Kumapim Star	29	12	9	5
5	Dawu Youngstars	26	8	8	10
6	Neoplan Star	25	8	9	9
7	Berekum Arsenal United	24	9	11	6
8	Afienya United	24	6	8	12
9	Great Olympics	24	8	10	8
10	Real Tamale United	23	8	11	7

NB: Stats only shown for 10/14 clubs to focus on Dawu Youngstars

Dawu managed to emulate the success of the previous season, again finishing in 5th place. However, if they had won just one game fewer, Dawu would have finished in 10th place, an indication of how close the league was. The club was propelled by the goals of Abdul Mumuni, later to become a Ghanaian international, who was the Ghanaian Premier League's top scorer for the season.

=== Ghanaian Premier League Record 1992/93 ===
Position	Club	Points	Games won	Games lost	Games drawn
1	Asante Kotoko	32	12	2	8
2	Goldields SC	30	12	4	6
3	Dwarfs	24	8	6	8
4	Real Tamale United	23	8	7	7
5	Hearts of Oak	22	6	6	10
6	Dawu Youngstars	22	7	8	7
7	Neoplan Star	20	6	8	8
8	Great Olympics	20	8	10	4
9	Afienya United	20	7	9	6
10	Ghapoha	20	5	7	10

NB: Only 10/12 teams shown to focus on Dawu Youngstars

Dawu slipped to sixth place in the league but still enjoyed a successful season, including keeping 3 consecutive clean sheets between rounds 2–4. Dawu's striker Felix Aboagye was the league's joint-second top-scorer, with 8 goals.

=== Ghanaian Premier League Record 1993/94 ===
Position	Club	Points	Games won	Games lost	Games drawn
5	Dwarfs	25	9	6	7
6	Okwahu United	23	8	7	7
7	Ghapoha	21	5	6	11
8	Dawu Youngstars	21	7	8	7
9	Real Tamale United	21	7	8	7
10	Afineya United	19	6	9	7
11	Neoplan Star	14	6	14	2
12	Mighty Rules	7	3	17	3

Dawu dropped two places from the previous season but despite their low placing, were only six points away from 2nd placed Asante Kotoko.

=== Ghanaian Premier League Record 1994/95 ===
Position	Club	Points	Games won	Games lost	Games drawn
5	Dwarfs	30	7	6	9
6	Great Olympics	29	8	9	5
7	Dawu Youngstars	28	7	8	7
8	Okwahu	28	7	8	7
9	Afienya	26	7	10	5
10	Ghapoha	25	4	5	13

With just four games remaining in the league season, Dawu were in an impressive 3rd place, and could still have won the league. However, they took just one point from their last four matches and slumped to a 7th-placed finish. This poor end-of-season form almost dragged Dawu into the relegation zone, as they finished just four points clear of the two relegated teams.

=== Ghanaian Premier League Record 1999 ===
Position	Team	Points	Games won	Games lost	Games drawn
9	Great Olympics	41	11	11	8
10	Liberty Professionals	39	12	15	3
11	Dawu Youngstars	37	9	11	10
12	Power FC	36	9	12	9
13	Ghapoha Readers	36	8	10	12
14	Tano Bafoakwa	33	10	17	3
15	All Blacks	32	10	15	5
16	Afienya United	14	2	20	8

Dawu finished just four points above the relegation zone in a disappointing season. In a season of mixed results, including a 5–1 win over Ghapoha and a 5-1 reverse at Hearts of Oak, Youngstars saved themselves from relegation with an improved second half of the season, with two wins and a draw from the club's final three games. In the FA Cup, Dawu were eliminated in the first round after losing 6–5 to Corners of Konongo on penalties.

=== Ghanaian Premier League Record 2000 ===
Position	Team	Points	Games won	Games lost	Games drawn
11	Kwaebibirem United	38	11	14	5
12	Great Olympics	37	10	10	10
13	Dawu Youngstars	36	8	11	11
14	Power FC	35	8	11	11
15	Cape Coast Ebusua Dwarfs	34	8	12	10
16	Brong Ahofu United	27	6	15	9

Dawu very narrowly avoided relegation on the last day of the season. After a poor start to the 2000 campaign, including a 5–0 loss to Asante Kotoko and just one win in their first 11 games, the Youngstars needed a victory over their opponents to ensure survival. However, as if matters were not difficult enough already, Dawu's opponents were none other than league champions Accra Hearts of Oak, the most successful club in Ghana. Incredibly, Hearts failed to show and the three points were awarded to Dawu, the club avoiding a relegation playoff by just one point.

Dawu found success in the 2000 Ghanaian FA Cup, defeating Odupong Heroes, Cape Coast Ebusua Dwarfs and King Faisal before losing in the semi-finals, although the club was perhaps unlucky to be drawn away from home in three of their four matches. Dawu beat Odupong Heroes thanks to a 2nd-minute penalty from Abdulai Tahiru and second half goals from Awudu Adama and Samuel Tona. The table below shows the Youngstars' FA Cup progress.

Round	Opponent	Result
4th Round	Odupong Heroes (H)	Won 3–0
5th Round	Cape Coast Ebusua Dwarfs (A)	Won 0–2
Quarter Final	King Faisal (A)	Won 1–2
Semi Final	Hearts of Oak (A)	Lost 1–0

(H) = Home match (A)= Away match

=== Ghanaian Premier League Record 2001 ===
Position	Team	Points	Games won	Games lost	Games drawn
1	Hearts of Oak	64	19	4	7
2	Asante Kotoko	55	18	8	4
3	Goldfields	45	14	13	3
4	Dawu Youngstars	42	13	14	3
5	Tano Bafoakwa	41	11	11	8
6	Liberty Professionals	40	11	12	7
7	King Faisal Babes	40	11	9	10
8	Great Olympics	39	9	9	12
9	Okwahu United	39	10	11	9
10	Hasaacas	39	11	13	6
11	Arsenals	39	11	13	6
12	Maxbees	37	11	15	4
13	Real Tamale United	35	13	12	5
14	Ghapoha Readers	35	9	13	8
15	Adansiman	35	10	15	5
16	Kwaebibirem United	29	8	17	5

Dawu Youngstars' Awudu Adama was the league's joint second top-scorer, with 9 goals. Dawu were knocked out in the early stages of the 2001 Ghanaian FA Cup and did not reach the quarter-finals of the competition. Adansiman and Kwaebibirem United were relegated to the Ghanaian First Division. Dawu's results in the league included a 4–1 win over Maxbees and a 1–0 win over domestic giants and 2nd placed Asante Kotoko.

=== Ghanaian Premier League Record 2002 ===
Position	Team	Points	Games won	Games lost	Games drawn
1	Hearts of Oak	78	25	2	3
2	Asante Kotoko	73	23	3	4
3	Liberty Professionals	48	13	8	9
4	Great Olympics	44	11	8	11
5	King Faisal Babes	40	10	10	10
6	Real Tamale United	40	11	12	7
7	Goldfields	38	9	10	11
8	Brong Ahofu United	38	10	12	8
9	Hasaacas	37	11	15	4
10	Arsenals	36	10	14	6
11	Prestea Mines Stars	35	10	15	5
12	Tano Bafoatwa	34	7	10	13
13	Okwahu United	32	8	14	8
14	Power FC	31	7	13	10
15	Dawu Youngstars	30	7	14	9
16	Maxbees	22	4	16	10

Dawu and Maxbees were automatically relegated to the Ghana First Division and Power FC joined them after losing the relegation/promotion playoff. The club endured a nightmare start to that season, winning just one of their first 12 games in the 30-round season. Dawu finished just one point away from safety, but still would have had to go through a relegation/promotion play-off if they had finished 14th. The club finished on 30 points, winning 8, drawing 8 and losing 14 games. Dawu Youngstars have not returned to the Ghanaian Premier League since.

In January 2004, Accra Hearts of Oak were made to pay 33 million cedis to Dawu for the transfer of Awudu Adama, which had happened during the 2002 season. Hearts had originally agreed to pay 80 million cedis for Adama but despite reminders from Youngstars had not paid the transfer in full. Dawu's joint top-scorers for the season were Eric Mbroah, Paul Ofori, Issah Ahmed and Mohammed Polo, all with four goals.
