= Muhammed Tijani =

Ghanaian footballer

Personal information
- Full name: Muhammed Tijani
- Place of birth: Ghana
- Position: Striker

Senior career*
Years	Team	Apps	(Gls)
- Cornerstones F.C.
- * Club domestic league appearances and goals

Muhammed Tijani is a former Ghanaian footballer who played for Cornerstones F.C. He was adjudged the Ghana Premier League top goal scorer in 1990.

== Career ==
Tijani played for Cornerstones FC. During the 1989–90 Ghana Premier League season, he scored 15 goals to win the top scorer award.

== Honours ==
=== Individual ===
- Ghana Premier League Top scorer: 1989–90
