= Samartex F.C. =

Ghanaian football club

Samartex
- Full name: Football Club Samartex 1996
- Nickname: The Timber Giants
- Founded: 1996
- Ground: Samartex Park, Samreboi, Western Region, Ghana
- Capacity: 7,000
- League: Ghana Premier League
- 2025–26: 7th
- Website: www.fcsamartex.com

Football Club Samartex 1996, more commonly known as Samartex, is a Ghanaian professional football club based in Samreboi, Western Region, Ghana, that competes in the Ghana Premier League, the top-flight of Ghanaian football. It plays its home matches at Samartex Park.

== History ==
Football Club Samartex 1996 was founded in 1995 by the Samartex Timber & Plywood Company as a recreational football club, and gained promotion from the Third Division to the Second Division of the Western Region in their first season.

The club spent the following years and existence below the Ghana Premier League before reaching there in the 2022–23 season via them winning the 2021–22 Division One League Zone 2 title. They surprisingly won the league title for the first time in the club's history after edging out Bibiani Gold Stars in the 2023–24 season, thus qualifying for the 2024–25 CAF Champions League.

== Season trajectory ==
1996–1997: Division Three

1997–2021: Division Two

2021–2022: Division One League

2022–present: Ghana Premier League

== Honours ==
- Ghana Division One League Zone 2: 2023–24
- Ghana Premier League: 2023–24
