= Bismark Idan =

Ghanaian footballer

Personal information
- Full name: Bismark Idan
- Date of birth: 10 August 1989 (age 37)
- Place of birth: Agona Swedru, Ghana
- Height: 1.75 m (5 ft 9 in)
- Position: Forward

Team information
- Current team: Al Khartoum

Senior career*
Years	Team	Apps	(Gls)
2009–2010	Kessben		(13)
2010–2011	Berekum Chelsea		
2011–2012	Göztepe	7	(0)
2012–2014	Berekum Chelsea		
2014–2016	New Edubiase United		
2016–	Al Khartoum	0	(0)
- * Club domestic league appearances and goals as of 1 January 2014

Bismark Idan (born 10 August 1989) is a Ghanaian professional footballer who plays for Al Khartoum in the Sudan Premier League as a forward.
