= Augustine Okrah =

Ghanaian footballer

Personal information
- Date of birth: 14 September 1993 (age 33)
- Place of birth: Ghana
- Height: 1.72 m (5 ft 8 in)
- Positions: Attacking midfielder; winger

Team information
- Current team: Bechem United

Youth career
- Bechem
- Red Bull Ghana

Senior career*
| Years | Team | Apps | (Gls) |
| 2012–2013 | Asante Kotoko | | |
| 2013 | → Liberty Professionals (loan) | | |
| 2013–2014 | Bechem United | | (16) |
| 2014 | → BK Häcken (loan) | 1 | (0) |
| 2015–2016 | Al-Merrikh | | (24) |
| 2016–2017 | Al-Hilal Club | | (8) |
| 2018 | NorthEast United | 4 | (0) |
| 2019–2021 | Asante Kotoko | 28 | (3) |
| 2021–2022 | Bechem United | 32 | (14) |
| 2022–2024 | Simba | 0 | (0) |
| 2024– | Bechem United | 20 | (6) |

International career
| 2013 | Ghana U20 | 4 | (5) |
| 2019– | Ghana | 2 | (0) |
- * Club domestic league appearances and goals as of 08:08, 25 January 2026 (UTC)

Augustine Okrah (born September 1993) is a Ghanaian footballer who plays as an attacking midfielder or winger for Bechem United.

== Honours ==
Asante Kotoko

- Ghana Premier League: 2011–12
- President's Cup: 2017

Al-Merrikh

- Sudan Premier League: 2015
- Sudan Cup: 2015

Al-Hilal

- Sudan Premier League: 2017
- Sudan Cup runner up: 2017

Bechem United

- Ghana FA Cup runner up: 2021–22

Individual

- Ghana Premier League Top scorer: 2013–14
- Ghana Premier League Player of the Season: 2013–14
