= Bofoakwa Tano F.C. =

Bofoakwa Tano F.C
- Full name: Bofoakwa Tano Football Club
- Nickname(s): Hunters
- Founded: 1959
- Ground: Coronation Park; Sunyani, Ghana
- Capacity: 5,000
- Chairman: Alexander Ababio
- Manager: John Eduafor Jnr
- League: Ghana Premier League
- 2023–24: 15th (Ghana Premier League)
Home colours	Away colours

Bofoakwa Tano is a Ghanaian association football club based in Sunyani in the Bono Region. The club is a member of the Ghana Premier League and play at Coronation Park.

== History ==
Bofoakwa were first promoted to the top division in 1967. Despite finishing second-bottom in their first season, and bottom in their second season, they avoided relegation due to league restructuring, and in 1970 they managed a 6th-place finish. The 1972 season saw the club finish as runners-up to Asante Kotoko, and third place was achieved in 1974 and 1975, the club also winning the SWAG Cup in the latter season.

The club returned to the second tier after finishing bottom in 1979. They were promoted back to the top flight in 1982, but were relegated again in 1985.

The club reappeared in the top division in 1989–90, by which time the league had switched to winter. They were relegated again in 1990–91, promoted back in 1994–95, relegated in 1996–97, promoted in 1997–98. In 1999 they finished third from bottom, but avoided another relegation by winning a play-off. However, they were relegated again in 2006–07.

At the end of the 2022–23 season Bofoakwa were again promoted to the Ghana Premier League after beating Techiman Eleven Wonders in the Division One playoff final.

== Honours ==
- SWAG Cup: 1

1975
