= Real Tamale United =

- Full name: Real Tamale United
- Founded: 1976; 50 years ago
- Ground: Aliu Mahama Sports Stadium
- Capacity: 20,000
- League: Ghana Premier League
Home colours	Away colours

Real Tamale United, often abbreviated as RTU, is a football club based in Tamale, Northern Region of Ghana. The team was relegated to the second tier Division One League in 2013. In 2021, RTU sealed promotion back to the first tier Ghana Premier League after beating Unity FC 2–0 on the last day of the Division One League Season. Their home stadium is 21,000 Seater Capacity Aliu Mahama Sports Stadium in Tamale. They relocated to their current grounds from the Kaladan Park after the 2008 African Cup of Nations.

== History ==
The club was founded in 1976 by the first chairman Alhaji Adam.H (Progress).

== Support ==
=== Rivalries ===
Real Tamale United has rivalries with Steadfast FC and Tamale City FC. All three clubs are located in Tamale, Ghana, causing rivalries amongst one another.

== Honours ==
- Ghana Telecom Gala: 1

1997–98

- GN Bank Division One League: 1

2015–16

== Performance in CAF competitions ==
- CAF Cup: 3 appearances

1992 – First Round
1996 – disqualified in First Round
1998 – First Round

== Current squad ==
As of 14 October 2022. Note: Flags indicate national team as defined under FIFA eligibility rules; some limited exceptions apply. Players may hold more than one non-FIFA nationality.

No.	Pos.	Nation	Player
1	GK	GHA	Emmanuel Essandoh
2	DF	GHA	Yussif Nuru Deen
3	MF	GHA	Moro Iddrisu
4	DF	GHA	Mathew Abayase
5	MF	GHA	Baba Kushibo
6	DF	GHA	Hedir Mohammed
7	MF	GHA	Prince Atta Antwi
8	MF	GHA	Mohammed Sadat
9	FW	GHA	Francis Effah
10	FW	GHA	Ronald Frimpong
13	FW	GHA	Labandoo Abdulai
14	FW	GHA	Kwame Boakye
16	GK	GHA	Mubarik Somed
17	MF	GHA	David Abagna

No.	Pos.	Nation	Player
18	DF	GHA	Iddrisu Shakun
19	FW	GHA	Listowel Amankona
20	MF	GHA	Dankwa Badu
21	FW	GHA	Abdul Sayibu
22	GK	GHA	Osei Yaw
24	MF	GHA	Iddrisu Gadafi
25	DF	GHA	Samuel Bawa
27	MF	GHA	Mustapha Fuseini
28	MF	GHA	Hafiz Abdulai
29	FW	GHA	Martin Akolgo
32	DF	GHA	Bismark Adu
33	FW	GHA	Issah Kuka
36	MF	GHA	Shafiq Muntari

== Management ==
Position	Name
Chief Executive Officer	Kassim Perez

== Previous players ==
- Category:Real Tamale United players
