= 2026–27 CAF Confederation Cup qualifying rounds =

International football competition in Africa

- Dates: 4 September – 25 October 2026

Tournament statistics
- Matches played: 75
- Goals scored: 193 (2.57 per match)

The 2026–27 CAF Confederation Cup qualifying rounds ran from 4 September to 25 October 2026. Fifty-six (56) teams competed in two qualifying rounds to decide the 16 places in the group stage of the 2026–27 CAF Confederation Cup.

All times are local.

== Draw ==
The draw for the qualifying rounds was held on 6 August 2026, 11:00 GMT (14:00 local time, UTC+3), at the CAF headquarters in Cairo, Egypt.

With 56 clubs registered to take part in the qualifying rounds, eight clubs have received byes to the second round. The remaining sides have been placed in Pots depending on their CAF 5-year ranking and were drawn taking into account several factors, including geographical location.

Entry round	Second round (8 teams)	First round (48 teams)
Teams	(Egypt) Al Ahly (66 pts); (Algeria) USM Alger (52 pts); (Morocco) AS FAR (41 pts); (Algeria) CR Belouizdad (38 pts); (Morocco) Raja CA (17 pts); (Democratic Republic of the Congo) Maniema Union (14 pts); (South Africa) Kaizer Chiefs (5 pts); (Tanzania) Azam (5 pts)	(Botswana) Jwaneng Galaxy (4 pts); (Tunisia) CS Sfaxien (3 pts); (Libya) Al Ahli (3 pts); (Tanzania) Singida Black Stars (2.5 pts); (Mozambique) Black Bulls (2 pts); (Mali) Real Bamako (2 pts); (Togo) ASKO Kara (2 pts); (Somalia) Mogadishu City; (Uganda) Kitara; (Egypt) ZED; ASAS Djibouti Télécom; (Sudan) Hilal Alsahil; (Ethiopia) Welwalo Adigrat; (Zanzibar) KMKM; (Sudan) Al Ahli Madani; (Kenya) Tusker; (South Sudan) Al-Ghazala; (Equatorial Guinea) The Panthers; (Benin) ASPAC; (Chad) AS PSI; (Ivory Coast) CO Korhogo; (Mauritania) AS Douanes; (Guinea) Hafia; (Nigeria) El-Kanemi Warriors; (Guinea-Bissau) UD Internacional; (Ivory Coast) AFAD Djékanou; (Sierra Leone) East End Lions; (Nigeria) Shooting Stars; (Tunisia) ES Zarzis; (Senegal) Diambars; (Burkina Faso) Vitesse; (Mali) FC Diarra; (Ghana) Nations FC; (Niger) AS ZAM; (Namibia) UNAM; (Angola) Kabuscorp; (Zambia) Red Arrows; (Madagascar) Rouge; (South Africa) Durban City; (Burundi) Rukinzo; (Mauritius) AS Port-Louis; (Cameroon) Panthère Sportive; (Rwanda) Rayon Sports; (Comoros) Atomic Ngomé; (Democratic Republic of the Congo) DC Virunga; (Seychelles) Bazar Brothers; (Eswatini) Green Mamba; (Angola) Primeiro de Agosto

== Format ==
In the qualifying rounds, each tie will be played on a home-and-away two-legged basis. If the aggregate score will be tied after the second leg, the away goals rule will be applied, and if still tied, extra time will not be played, and a penalty shoot-out will be used to determine the winner (Regulations III. 13 & 14).

== Schedule ==
The schedule of the competition will be as follows.

Schedule for the 2026–27 CAF Champions League qualifying rounds
Round	Draw date	First leg	Second leg
First round	6 August 2026	4–6 September 2026	11–13 September 2026
Second round	6 August 2026	16–18 October 2026	13–25 October 2026

== Bracket ==
The bracket of the draw was announced by the CAF on 6 August 2026. The 16 winners of the second round will advance to the group stage.

First round					Second round
1	(Somalia) Mogadishu City	1	0	1
4	(Uganda) Kitara	2	2	4
4	(Uganda) Kitara	2	2	4	(Uganda) Kitara	1	0	1
					(Egypt) Al Ahly	2	4	6

First round					Second round
1	(Egypt) ZED	4	1	5
4	ASAS Djibouti Télécom	0	1	1
4	ASAS Djibouti Télécom	0	1	1	(Egypt) ZED	1	0	1
					(Tanzania) Azam	1	1	2

First round
1	(Sudan) Hilal Alsahil	2	1	3 (1)
4	(Ethiopia) Welwalo Adigrat (p)	1	2	3 (4)
3	(Zanzibar) KMKM	0	0	0
2	(Libya) Al Ahli	3	4	7

Second round
(Ethiopia) Welwalo Adigrat	0	1	1
(Libya) Al Ahli	4	4	8

First round
1	(Sudan) Al Ahli Madani	2	0	2
4	(Kenya) Tusker	2	1	3
3	(South Sudan) Al-Ghazala	1	0	1
2	(Tanzania) Singida Black Stars	7	3	10

Second round
(Kenya) Tusker	0	1	1
(Tanzania) Singida Black Stars	1	1	2

First round					Second round
1	(Equatorial Guinea) The Panthers (a)	1	4	5
4	(Benin) ASPAC	3	2	5
4	(Benin) ASPAC	3	2	5	(Equatorial Guinea) The Panthers	—	—
					(Algeria) USM Alger	—	—	w/o

First round					Second round
1	(Chad) AS PSI	2	0	2
4	(Ivory Coast) CO Korhogo	2	2	4
4	(Ivory Coast) CO Korhogo	2	2	4	(Ivory Coast) CO Korhogo	0	1	1
					(Morocco) AS FAR	0	2	2

First round					Second round
1	(Mauritania) AS Douanes	2	1	3
4	(Guinea) Hafia	2	0	2
4	(Guinea) Hafia	2	0	2	(Mauritania) AS Douanes
					(Algeria) CR Belouizdad

First round					Second round
1	(Nigeria) El-Kanemi Warriors	3	0	3
4	(Guinea-Bissau) UD Internacional	0	1	1
4	(Guinea-Bissau) UD Internacional	0	1	1	(Nigeria) El-Kanemi Warriors	2	0	2
					(Morocco) Raja CA	2	2	4

First round
1	(Ivory Coast) AFAD Djékanou (a)	1	2	3
4	(Sierra Leone) East End Lions	1	2	3
3	(Nigeria) Shooting Stars	1	0	1
2	(Tunisia) CS Sfaxien	0	2	2

Second round
(Ivory Coast) AFAD Djékanou	1	0	1
(Tunisia) CS Sfaxien	1	1	2

First round
1	(Tunisia) ES Zarzis	3	0	3
4	(Senegal) Diambars	1	1	2
3	(Burkina Faso) Vitesse	1	0	1
2	(Mali) Real Bamako	2	0	2

Second round
(Tunisia) ES Zarzis	1	2	3
(Mali) Real Bamako	3	2	5

First round
1	(Mali) Diarra	1	1	2
4	(Ghana) Nations	0	1	1
3	(Niger) AS ZAM	0	0	0
2	(Togo) ASKO Kara	5	1	6

Second round
(Mali) Diarra	3	0	3
(Togo) ASKO Kara (a)	2	1	3

First round					Second round
1	(Namibia) UNAM	0	1	1
4	(Angola) Kabuscorp	2	3	5
4	(Angola) Kabuscorp	2	3	5	(Angola) Kabuscorp	1	1	2
					(Democratic Republic of the Congo) Maniema Union	4	4	8

First round					Second round
1	(Zambia) Red Arrows	2	2	4
4	(Madagascar) Rouge	0	0	0
4	(Madagascar) Rouge	0	0	0	(Zambia) Red Arrows (p)	1	0	1 (3)
					(South Africa) Kaizer Chiefs	0	1	1 (2)

First round
1	(South Africa) Durban City	1	2	3
4	(Burundi) Rukinzo	0	1	1
3	(Mauritius) AS Port-Louis	1	1	2
2	(Botswana) Jwaneng Galaxy	1	0	1

Second round
(South Africa) Durban City	3	3	6
(Mauritius) AS Port-Louis	1	0	1

First round
1	(Cameroon) Panthère Sportive	1	0	1
4	(Rwanda) Rayon Sports (a)	1	0	1
3	(Comoros) Atomic Ngomé	0	0	0
2	(Mozambique) Black Bulls	1	0	1

Second round
(Rwanda) Rayon Sports	0	2	2
(Mozambique) Black Bulls	2	2	4

First round
1	(Democratic Republic of the Congo) DC Virunga	1	1
4	(Seychelles) Bazar Brothers	0	0
3	(Eswatini) Green Mamba	0	0	0
2	(Angola) Primeiro de Agosto	2	2	4

Second round
(Democratic Republic of the Congo) DC Virunga	1	0	1
(Angola) Primeiro de Agosto	2	1	3

== First round ==
The first round, also called the first preliminary round, will include the 48 teams that did not receive byes to the second round.

Team 1	Agg.	Team 2	1st leg	2nd leg
Mogadishu City (Somalia)	1–4	(Uganda) Kitara	1–2	0–2
ZED (Egypt)	5–1	ASAS Djibouti Télécom	4–0	1–1
Hilal Alsahil (Sudan)	3–3 (1–4 p)	(Ethiopia) Welwalo Adigrat	2–1	1–2
KMKM (Zanzibar)	0–7	(Libya) Al Ahli	0–3	0–4
Al Ahli Madani (Sudan)	2–3	(Kenya) Tusker	2–2	0–1
Al-Ghazal (South Sudan)	1–10	(Tanzania) Singida Black Stars	1–7	0–3
The Panthers (Equatorial Guinea)	5–5 (a)	(Benin) ASPAC	1–3	4–2
AS PSI (Chad)	2–4	(Ivory Coast) CO Korhogo	2–2	0–2
AS Douanes (Mauritania)	3–2	(Guinea) Hafia	2–2	1–0
El-Kanemi Warriors (Nigeria)	3–1	(Guinea-Bissau) UD Internacional	3–0	0–1
AFAD Djékanou (Ivory Coast)	3–3 (a)	(Sierra Leone) East End Lions	1–1	2–2
Shooting Stars (Nigeria)	1–2	(Tunisia) CS Sfaxien	1–0	0–2
ES Zarzis (Tunisia)	3–2	(Senegal) Diambars	3–1	0–1
Vitesse (Burkina Faso)	1–2	(Mali) Real Bamako	1–2	0–0
Diarra (Mali)	2–1	(Ghana) Nations	1–0	1–1
AS ZAM (Niger)	0–6	(Togo) ASKO Kara	0–5	0–1
UNAM (Namibia)	1–5	(Angola) Kabuscorp	0–2	1–3
Red Arrows (Zambia)	4–0	(Madagascar) Rouge	2–0	2–0
Durban City (South Africa)	3–1	(Burundi) Rukinzo	1–0	2–1
AS Port-Louis (Mauritius)	2–1	(Botswana) Jwaneng Galaxy	1–1	1–0
Panthère Sportive (Cameroon)	1–1 (a)	(Rwanda) Rayon Sports	1–1	0–0
Atomic Ngomé (Comoros)	0–1	(Mozambique) Black Bulls	0–1	0–0
DC Virunga (Democratic Republic of the Congo)	1–0	(Seychelles) Bazar Brothers	Canceled	1–0
Green Mamba (Eswatini)	0–4	(Angola) Primeiro de Agosto	0–2	0–2

6 September 2026
16:00 UTC+3

Mogadishu City (Somalia)	1–2	(Uganda) Kitara
Khamis 16'	Report	Kalema 34', 35'

Hoima City Stadium, Hoima (Uganda)
Referee: Rodrigue Bigirimana (Burundi)
12 September 2026
16:00 UTC+3

Kitara (Uganda)	2–0	(Somalia) Mogadishu City
Kalema 31'; Tumwesigye 62'	Report

Hoima City Stadium, Hoima

Kitara won 4–1 on aggregate.

6 September 2026
20:00 UTC+3

ZED (Egypt)	4–0	ASAS Djibouti Télécom
El Saghiri 21'; Atef 44'; El Banouby 87'; Adel 90+1'	Report

Cairo International Stadium, Cairo
Referee: Mohamed Agha (Libya)
12 September 2026
20:00 UTC+3

ASAS Djibouti Télécom	1–1	(Egypt) ZED
Bakri 8' (o.g.)	Report	El Banouby 26'

Al Salam Stadium, Cairo (Egypt)
Referee: Lawrence Zimondi (Zimbabwe)

ZED won 5–1 on aggregate.

4 September 2026
19:00 UTC+2

Hilal Alsahil (Sudan)	2–1	(Ethiopia) Welwalo Adigrat
Al-Shoala 41'; Fares 87'	Report	Damtew 43'

Kigali Pelé Stadium, Kigali (Rwanda)
Referee: Joshua Duula (Uganda)
12 September 2026
16:00 UTC+3

Welwalo Adigrat (Ethiopia)	2–1	(Sudan) Hilal Alsahil
Damtew 50', 56'	Report	Anas 83'

Dire Dawa Stadium, Dire Dawa

3–3 on aggregate. Welwalo Adigrat won 4–1 on penalties.

5 September 2026
16:00 UTC+3

KMKM (Zanzibar)	0–3	(Libya) Al Ahli
	Report	Elhouni 20'; Mayele 22'; Dehiri 27'

Amaan Stadium, Zanzibar City
Referee: Solomon Lokudo (South Sudan)
12 September 2026
19:00 UTC+2

Al Ahli (Libya)	4–0	(Zanzibar) KMKM
Elhouni 7'; Mayele 25', 56'; Girumugisha 71'	Report

Tripoli Stadium, Tripoli
Referee: Ousmane Diakité (Mali)

Al Ahli won 7–0 on aggregate.

6 September 2026
16:00 UTC+2

Al Ahli Madani (Sudan)	2–2	(Kenya) Tusker
Alsamani 57', 85' (pen.)	Report	Mbaoma 11' (pen.), 45+3'

Kigali Pelé Stadium, Kigali (Rwanda)
Referee: Henok Abebe (Ethiopia)
12 September 2026
15:00 UTC+3

Tusker (Kenya)	1-0	(Sudan) Al Ahli Madani
Erambo 62'	Report

Nyayo National Stadium, Nairobi
Referee: Edson Antonio Esoko (Angola)

Tusker won 3–2 on aggregate.

6 September 2026
15:30 UTC+2

Al-Ghazala (South Sudan)	1–7	(Tanzania) Singida Black Stars
Zekeria 70'	Report	Tegisi 20', 22', 32'; Khamis 41'; Sowah 62', 90'; David 86'

Juba Stadium, Juba
13 September 2026
16:00 UTC+2

Singida Black Stars (Tanzania)	3–0	(South Sudan) Al-Ghazala
Sowah 13', 21'; David 66'	Report

Chamazi Stadium, Dar es Salaam

Singida Black Stars won 10–1 on aggregate.

10 September 2026
16:00 UTC+1

The Panthers (Equatorial Guinea)	1–3	(Benin) ASPAC
Ntutum 28'	Report	Djatti 58'; Tchalla 70'; Chinonso 88'

Japoma Stadium, Douala (Cameroon)
16 September 2026
15:00 UTC+0

ASPAC (Benin)	2–4	(Equatorial Guinea) The Panthers
Mayé 28', 45+2'	Report	32' (pen.); 45+4'; 66'; 75'

Kégué Stadium, Lomé (Togo)

5–5 on aggregate. The Panthers won on away goals.

4 September 2026
15:30 UTC+1

AS PSI (Chad)	2–2	(Ivory Coast) CO Korhogo
Mbarbill 67'; Saviola 73'	Report	Zeba 14'; Adje 89'

Idriss Déby Itno Stadium, N'Djamena
13 September 2026
16:00 UTC+0

CO Korhogo (Ivory Coast)	2–0	(Chad) AS PSI
Adje 12'; Any 56' (pen.)	Report

Amadou Gon Coulibaly Stadium, Korhogo

CO Korhogo won 4–2 on aggregate.

5 September 2026
16:00 UTC+0

AS Douanes (Mauritania)	2–2	(Guinea) Hafia
Oubeid 10'; Mbarbill 35'	Report	N'Diaye 33'; Bangoura 37'

Cheikha Ould Boïdiya Stadium, Nouakchott
Referee: Aboubacry Ndiaye (Senegal)
19 September 2026
16:00 UTC+0

Hafia (Guinea)	0–1	(Mauritania) AS Douanes
	Report	Bodda 72'

28 September Stadium, Conakry
Referee: Mohamed Marigo (Gambia)

AS Douanes won 3–2 on aggregate.

6 September 2026
16:00 UTC+1

El-Kanemi Warriors (Nigeria)	3–0	(Guinea-Bissau) UD Internacional
Mejuobi 52', 56' (pen.); Wahab 87'	Report

Remo Stars Stadium, Ikenne
13 September 2026
16:00 UTC+0

UD Internacional (Guinea-Bissau)	1–0	(Nigeria) El-Kanemi Warriors
	Report

24 September Stadium, Bissau

El-Kanemi Warriors won 3–1 on aggregate.

6 September 2026
16:00 UTC+0

AFAD Djékanou (Ivory Coast)	1–1	(Sierra Leone) East End Lions
	Report	Wahab 72'

Felix Houphouet Boigny Stadium, Abidjan
12 September 2026
16:00 UTC+0

East End Lions (Sierra Leone)	2–2	(Ivory Coast) AFAD Djékanou
Kargbo 13'; Bangura 24'	Report

Samuel Kanyon Doe Sports Complex, Monrovia (Liberia)

3–3 on aggregate. AFAD Djékanou won on away goals.

5 September 2026
16:00 UTC+1

Shooting Stars (Nigeria)	1–0	(Tunisia) CS Sfaxien
Emmanuel 26'	Report

MKO Abiola Stadium, Abeokuta
Referee: Fodouop Yannick (Cameroon)
13 September 2026
18:00 UTC+1

CS Sfaxien (Tunisia)	2–0	(Nigeria) Shooting Stars
Belwafi 27'; Habchia 67'	Report

Taieb Mhiri Stadium, Sfax

CS Sfaxien won 2–1 on aggregate.

4 September 2026
15:30 UTC+1

ES Zarzis (Tunisia)	3–1	(Senegal) Diambars
Kassab 35', 56'; Diouf 70'	Report	Diallo 13'

Taieb Mhiri Stadium, Sfax
Referee: Mohamed Akakpo (Togo)
12 September 2026
17:00 UTC+0

Diambars (Senegal)	1–0	(Tunisia) ES Zarzis
Mendy 37'	Report

Leopold Sédar Senghor Stadium, Dakar, Dakar

ES Zarzis won 3–2 on aggregate.

6 September 2026
16:00 UTC+0

Vitesse (Burkina Faso)	1–2	(Mali) Real Bamako
Dah 26'	Report	Kamaté 38'; Diarra 44'

4 August Stadium, Ouagadougou
11 September 2026
16:00 UTC+0

Real Bamako (Mali)	0–0	(Burkina Faso) Vitesse
	Report

Mamadou Konaté Stadium, Bamako

Real Bamako won 2–1 on aggregate.

5 September 2026
16:00 UTC+0

Diarra (Mali)	1–0	(Ghana) Nations
Bagayoko 49'	Report

Mamadou Konaté Stadium, Bamako
Referee: Merveil Mandekouzou Vendafara (Central Africa)
13 September 2026
15:00 UTC+0

Nations (Ghana)	1–1	(Mali) Diarra
Ouedraogo 84'	Report	Traoré 76'

Accra Sports Stadium, Accra
Referee: Chanshi Kasongo (Zambia)

Diarra won 2–1 on aggregate.

5 September 2026
16:30 UTC+1

AS ZAM (Niger)	0–5	(Togo) ASKO Kara
	Report	Bagayoko 58', 69'; Gueo 78'; Akpaho 80'; Coulibaly 83'

Seyni Kountche Stadium, Niamey
13 September 2026
15:30 UTC+0

ASKO Kara (Togo)	1–0	(Niger) AS ZAM
Raïb 2'	Report

Kégué Stadium, Lomé
Referee: Julian Nunoo (Ghana)

ASKO Kara won 6–0 on aggregate.

5 September 2026
17:00 UTC+1

UNAM (Namibia)	0–2	(Angola) Kabuscorp
	Report	Boyo 6'; Benarfa 73'

11 November Stadium, Luanda (Angola)
Referee: Easter Zimba (Malawi)
13 September 2026
17:00 UTC+1

Kabuscorp (Angola)	3–1	(Namibia) UNAM
Crespo 64'; Paciência 77', 79'	Report

11 November Stadium, Luanda

Kabuscorp won 5–1 on aggregate.

5 September 2026
15:00 UTC+2

Red Arrows (Zambia)	2–0	(Madagascar) Rouge
Mandanji 39'; Diarra 72'	Report

Levy Mwanawasa Stadium, Ndola
12 September 2026
15:00 UTC+4

Rouge (Madagascar)	0–2	(Zambia) Red Arrows
	Report	Mumba 23', 55'

Côte d'Or National Sports Complex, Saint Pierre (Mauritius)

Red Arrows won 4–0 on aggregate.

5 September 2026
15:00 UTC+2

Durban City (South Africa)	1–0	(Burundi) Rukinzo
65' (o.g.)	Report

Moses Mabhida Stadium, Durban
Referee: Ahomlanto Dedjinnanchi (Benin)
13 September 2026
15:00 UTC+2

Rukinzo (Burundi)	1–2	(South Africa) Durban City
	Report	Jurgens 1'; Maseko 37'

Intwari Stadium, Bujumbura

6 September 2026
19:00 UTC+4

AS Port-Louis (Mauritius)	1–1	(Botswana) Jwaneng Galaxy
Beeharry 28'	Report	Ramotse 4'

Côte d'Or National Sports Complex, Saint Pierre
12 September 2026
19:00 UTC+2

Jwaneng Galaxy (Botswana)	0–1	(Mauritius) AS Port-Louis
	Report	Leclerc 72'

Obed Itani Chilume Stadium, Francistown
Referee: Rashid Conteh (Sierra Leone)

AS Port-Louis won 2–1 on aggregate.

4 September 2026
16:00 UTC+1

Panthère Sportive (Cameroon)	1–1	(Rwanda) Rayon Sports
Batto 14'	Report	Kameni 78'

Ahmadou Ahidjo Stadium, Yaoundé
Referee: Mahmoud Nagy (Egypt)
12 September 2026
18:00 UTC+2

Rayon Sports (Rwanda)	0–0	(Cameroon) Panthère Sportive
	Report

Kigali Pelé Stadium, Kigali

1–1 on aggregate. Rayon Sports won on away goals.

5 September 2026
15:00 UTC+2

Atomic Ngomé (Comoros)	0–1	(Mozambique) Black Bulls
	Report	Danilo 55'

Matola Stadium, Maputo (Mozambique)
Referee: Josianno Todihajaniaïna (Madagascar)
12 September 2026
18:30 UTC+2

Black Bulls (Mozambique)	0–0	(Comoros) Atomic Ngomé
	Report

Matola Stadium, Maputo

Black Bulls won 1–0 on aggregate.

6 September 2026
15:00 UTC+2

DC Virunga (Democratic Republic of the Congo)	Canceled	(Seychelles) Bazar Brothers
	Report

TP Mazembe Stadium, Lubumbashi
13 September 2026
15:30 UTC+2

Bazar Brothers (Seychelles)	0–1	(Democratic Republic of the Congo) DC Virunga
	Report	Yenga 40'

Lucas Moripe Stadium, Atteridgeville (South Africa)

DC Virunga won 1–0 on aggregate.

12 September 2026
15:00 UTC+2

Green Mamba (Eswatini)	0–2	(Angola) Primeiro de Agosto
	Report	54' (o.g.); Rupson 85'

Somhlolo National Stadium, Lobamba
11 September 2026
16:00 UTC+1

Primeiro de Agosto (Angola)	2–0	(Eswatini) Green Mamba
Dago 22', 38'	Report

França Ndalu Stadium, Luanda

Primeiro de Agosto won 4–0 on aggregate.

== Second round ==
The second round, also called the second preliminary round, will include 32 teams: the 8 teams that received byes to this round, and the 24 winners of the first round.

Team 1	Agg.	Team 2	1st leg	2nd leg
Kitara (Uganda)	1–6	(Egypt) Al Ahly	1–2	0–4
ZED (Egypt)	1–2	(Tanzania) Azam	1–1	0–1
Welwalo Adigrat (Ethiopia)	1–8	(Libya) Al Ahli	0–4	1–4
Tusker (Kenya)	1–2	(Tanzania) Singida Black Stars	0–1	1–1
The Panthers (Equatorial Guinea)	w/o (Note: USM Alger won on a walkover after The Panthers withdrew from the competition citing financial reasons.)	(Algeria) USM Alger	—	—
CO Korhogo (Ivory Coast)	1–2	(Morocco) AS FAR	0–0	1–2
AS Douanes (Mauritania)	SR7	(Algeria) CR Belouizdad	23 Nov	27 Nov
El-Kanemi Warriors (Nigeria)	2–4	(Morocco) Raja CA	2–2	0–2
AFAD Djékanou (Ivory Coast)	1–2	(Tunisia) CS Sfaxien	1–1	0–1
ES Zarzis (Tunisia)	3–5	(Mali) Real Bamako	1–3	2–2
Diarra (Mali)	3–3 (a)	(Togo) ASKO Kara	3–2	0–1
Kabuscorp (Angola)	2–8	(Democratic Republic of the Congo) Maniema Union	1–4	1–4
Red Arrows (Zambia)	1–1 (3–2 p)	(South Africa) Kaizer Chiefs	1–0	0–1
Durban City (South Africa)	6–1	(Mauritius) AS Port-Louis	3–1	3–0
Rayon Sports (Rwanda)	2–4	(Mozambique) Black Bulls	0–2	2–2
DC Virunga (Democratic Republic of the Congo)	1–3	(Angola) Primeiro de Agosto	1–2	0–1

Notes:

17 October 2026
16:00 UTC+3

Kitara (Uganda)	1–2	(Egypt) Al Ahly
Wahab 30'	Report	El Saaiy 67'; Zizo 82' (pen.)

Hoima City Stadium, Hoima
Referee: Eugene Mdluli (South Africa)
25 October 2026
19:00 UTC+3

Al Ahly (Egypt)	4–0	(Uganda) Kitara
El Shahat 37', 51'; Afsha 44'; Mohamed 68'	Report

Cairo International Stadium, Cairo
Referee: Thabani Ruzario (Zimbabwe)

Al Ahly won 6–1 on aggregate.

16 October 2026
20:00 UTC+3

ZED (Egypt)	1–1	(Tanzania) Azam
Nabil 45+1'	Report	Mwaikenda 58'

Cairo International Stadium, Cairo
Referee: Simões Bernardo Guambe David Chinoko (Mozambique)
24 October 2026
16:00 UTC+3

Azam (Tanzania)	1–0	(Egypt) ZED
Nado 66'	Report

Chamazi Stadium, Dar es Salaam
Referee: Andre Kolissala Mbangui (Central Africa)

Azam won 2–1 on aggregate.

October 2026
19:00 UTC+2

Welwalo Adigrat (Ethiopia)	0–4	(Libya) Al Ahli
	Report	Ellafi 14'; Tougai 21'; Al-Suwaii 51'; El Maremi 90+2'

Tripoli Stadium, Tripoli (Libya)
Referee: David Chinoko (Malawi)
24 October 2026
19:00 UTC+2

Al Ahli (Libya)	4–1	(Ethiopia) Welwalo Adigrat
Mayele 51'; El Maremi 76'; Al-Tawerghi 78'; Ellafi 90+3'	Report	Damtew 2'

Tripoli Stadium, Tripoli
Referee: El Hadji Amadou Sy (Senegal)

Al Ahli won 8–1 on aggregate.

18 October 2026
15:00 UTC+3

Tusker (Kenya)	0–1	(Tanzania) Singida Black Stars
	Report	Mboma 52'

Nyayo National Stadium, Nairobi
25 October 2026
19:00 UTC+3

Singida Black Stars (Tanzania)	1–1	(Kenya) Tusker
Sowah 67'	Report	Mbaoma 81'

Chamazi Stadium, Dar es Salaam

Singida Black Stars won 2–1 on aggregate.

20 October 2026
20:00 UTC+1

The Panthers (Equatorial Guinea)	w/o	(Algeria) USM Alger
	Report

Stade du 5 Juillet, Algiers (Algeria)
Referee: Mohamed Diraneh (Djibouti)
25 October 2026
20:00 UTC+1

USM Alger (Algeria)	w/o	(Equatorial Guinea) The Panthers
	Report

Stade du 5 Juillet, Algiers
Referee: Antsino Twanyanyukwa (Namibia)

17 October 2026
16:00 UTC+0

CO Korhogo (Ivory Coast)	0–0	(Morocco) AS FAR
	Report

Amadou Gon Coulibaly Stadium, Korhogo
Referee: Ousmane Diakité (Mali)
25 October 2026
20:00 UTC+1

AS FAR (Morocco)	2–1	(Ivory Coast) CO Korhogo
El Fahli 6' (pen.); Bach 84'	Report	Gautier 54'

Prince Moulay Abdellah Stadium, Rabat
Referee: Messie Nkounkou (Congo)

AS FAR won 2–1 on aggregate.

23 November 2026
17:00 UTC+0

AS Douanes (Mauritania)	v	(Algeria) CR Belouizdad
	Report

Cheikha Ould Boïdiya Stadium, Nouakchott
27 November 2026
20:00 UTC+1

CR Belouizdad (Algeria)	v	(Mauritania) AS Douanes
	Report

Stade du 5 Juillet, Algiers

18 October 2026
15:00 UTC+1

El-Kanemi Warriors (Nigeria)	2–2	(Morocco) Raja CA
Archibong 23'; Mejuobi 82'	Report	Abu Zrayq 23'; Oyewusi 60'

Remo Stars Stadium, Ikenne
Referee: Sulaiman Kamara (Sierra Leone)
23 October 2026
21:00 UTC+1

Raja CA (Morocco)	2–0	(Nigeria) El-Kanemi Warriors
Barkok 88'; Huja 90+5'	Report

Stade Mohammed V, Casablanca
Attendance: 40000
Referee: Yannick Kabanga Malala (DR Congo)

Raja CA won 4–2 on aggregate.

17 October 2026
16:00 UTC+0

AFAD Djékanou (Ivory Coast)	1–1	(Tunisia) CS Sfaxien
	Report	Loulendo 53'

Felix Houphouet Boigny Stadium, Abidjan
Referee: Fabrício Duarte (Cape Verde)
24 October 2026
18:00 UTC+1

CS Sfaxien (Tunisia)	1–0	(Ivory Coast) AFAD Djékanou
Belwafi 7'	Report

Taieb Mhiri Stadium, Sfax
Referee: Abdelaziz Bouh (Mauritania)

CS Sfaxien won 2–1 on aggregate.

17 October 2026
14:30 UTC+1

ES Zarzis (Tunisia)	1–3	(Mali) Real Bamako
Labidi 90+3' (pen.)	Report	Tangara 23'; Kamaté 45', 45+3'

Taieb Mhiri Stadium, Sfax
Referee: Lucky Kasalirwe (Uganda)
24 October 2026
17:00 UTC+0

Real Bamako (Mali)	2–2	(Tunisia) ES Zarzis
Diallo 4'; Maiga 90+2'	Report	Labidi 75', 79'

Mamadou Konaté Stadium, Bamako
Referee: Kouassi Biro (Ivory Coast)

Real Bamako won 5–3 on aggregate.

18 October 2026
16:30 UTC+0

Diarra (Mali)	3–2	(Togo) ASKO Kara
Samaké 13'; Traoré 28'; Sidibé 41'	Report	Akpaho 45+2'; Ahovey 58'

Mamadou Konaté Stadium, Bamako
25 October 2026
16:30 UTC+0

ASKO Kara (Togo)	1–0	(Mali) Diarra
Ouattara 45+4' (pen.)	Report

Kégué Stadium, Lomé

3–3 on aggregate. ASKO Kara won on away goals.

18 October 2026
15:00 UTC+1

Kabuscorp (Angola)	1–4	(Democratic Republic of the Congo) Maniema Union
Sem 84'	Report	Kané 32'; Namboka 43'; Ekofo 63', 73'

11 November Stadium, Luanda
25 October 2026
15:00 UTC+2

Maniema Union (Democratic Republic of the Congo)	4–1	(Angola) Kabuscorp
Pitroipa 10'; Soussou 37'; Kane 78'; Magagula 90'	Report	Hegene 76'

Martyrs Stadium, Kinshasa

Maniema Union won 8–2 on aggregate.

17 October 2026
15:00 UTC+2

Red Arrows (Zambia)	1–0	(South Africa) Kaizer Chiefs
Diarra 77'	Report

Levy Mwanawasa Stadium, Ndola
23 October 2026
18:00 UTC+2

Kaizer Chiefs (South Africa)	1–0	(Zambia) Red Arrows
Cross 66'	Report
Penalties
	2–3

Peter Mokaba Stadium, Polokwane

1–1 on aggregate. Red Arrows won 3–2 on penalties.

18 October 2026
15:00 UTC+2

Durban City (South Africa)	3–1	(Mauritius) AS Port-Louis
Domingo 15'; Sirino 46'; Morris 90+3'	Report	Roussety 53'

Moses Mabhida Stadium, Durban
25 October 2026
17:00 UTC+4

AS Port-Louis (Mauritius)	0–3	(South Africa) Durban City
	Report	Sirino 12'; Domingo 25'; Brooks 52'

Côte d'Or National Sports Complex, Saint Pierre

Durban City won 6–1 on aggregate.

17 October 2026
18:00 UTC+2

Rayon Sports (Rwanda)	0–2	(Mozambique) Black Bulls
	Report	Gueye 54'; Danilo 90+5'

Kigali Pelé Stadium, Kigali
24 October 2026
19:00 UTC+2

Black Bulls (Mozambique)	2–2	(Rwanda) Rayon Sports
Anuário 49'; Ndiaye 86'	Report	Iradukunda 19'; Muderi 85'

Matola Stadium, Maputo

Black Bulls won 4–2 on aggregate.

18 October 2026
15:00 UTC+2

DC Virunga (Democratic Republic of the Congo)	1–2	(Angola) Primeiro de Agosto
Elenga 69'	Report	Mukokiani 49'; Tombé 59'

Martyrs Stadium, Kinshasa
23 October 2026
20:00 UTC+1

Primeiro de Agosto (Angola)	1–0	(Democratic Republic of the Congo) DC Virunga
Mabilson 87'	Report

França Ndalu Stadium, Luanda

Primeiro de Agosto won 3–1 on aggregate.

== See also ==
- 2026–27 CAF Champions League qualifying rounds
