= 2024–25 Ghana FA Cup =

45th season of the Ghana FA Cup

MTN FA Cup

Tournament details
- Country: Ghana
- Dates: 25 October 2024 – 15 June 2025
- Teams: 156; 92 (qualifying competition); 64 (main competition incl. 32 qualifiers)

Tournament statistics
- Matches played: 123
- Top goal scorer(s): Ibrahim Alhassan (5 goals)

The 2024–25 Ghana FA Cup was the 45th season of the Ghana FA Cup, the primary knockout competition in Ghanaian football. Sponsored by MTN for the 15th straight season and known as the MTN FA Cup for sponsorship purposes, Nsoatreman were the defending champions, but were eliminated at the round of 32 stage on penalties by Young Apostles

Asante Kotoko won 1–0 against Golden Kicks in the final at the University of Ghana Stadium in Legon, Accra, on 15 June 2025, claiming their 10th title in the process. With the win, they return to the CAF Confederation Cup after a 6-year absence and faced Bibiani Goldstars, the 2024–25 Ghana Premier League champions, in the 2025 Champion of Champions at the latter's stadium, the Dun's Park in Bibiani. Kotoko triumphed 1–0 there and in the process claimed their second title within the space of 3 months.

== Preliminary round ==
| 25 October 2024 | Givova Sporting Academy | 0–0 (2–4 p) | Cape Coast Mysterious Dwarfs | Sekondi |
| 15:00 UTC | | Report | | Stadium: Sekondi Gyendu Stadium; Referee: Rita Boateng-Nkansah |

| 25 October 2024 | Techiman Heroes Sporting Club | 0–0 (4–3 p) | Victory Club Warriors | Techiman |
| 15:00 UTC | | Report | | Stadium: Ohene Ameyaw Stadium; Referee: Osman Dauda |

| 25 October 2024 | Lokoe Diamond FC | 0–3 | African Talent Football Academy | Ho |
| 15:00 UTC | | Report | Baffour Asare Nana 41'; Boateng Afriyie 73'; Thomas Anaafi 75' | Stadium: Ho Sports Stadium; Referee: Solomon Kojo Doku |

| 25 October 2024 | Asokwa Deportivo | 4–2 | Breman United | Kumasi |
| 15:00 UTC | Emmanuel Armah 31'; Bernard Adu Kusi 36', 63', Miller Abeiku 45+2' | Report | Sam Ortis 16'; Joel Agyemang 81' | Stadium: Ejius Okesse Park; Referee: David Parker |

| 26 October 2024 | Tamale City | 2–0 | Tamale Soccer Angels | Tamale |
| 15:00 UTC | Mikdar Ishak 51'; Abdul Majeed Mohammed 56' | Report | | Stadium: Aliu Mahama Sports Stadium; Referee: Barikisu Salifu |

| 26 October 2024 | Navrongo Mighty Warriors | w/o | Malima | Bolgatanga |
| 15:00 UTC | | Report | | Stadium: Paga Border Park; Referee: Abubakari Sadiq Yakubu |

| 26 October 2024 | Acceler8z | 1–0 | Kumasi Corners Stones | Kumasi |
| 15:00 UTC | Abbey Ejiri 6' | Report | | Stadium: WESCO Park; Referee: Juliet Appiah |

| 26 October 2024 | Golden Kick | 1–0 | Oda Kotoku Royals | Accra |
| 15:00 UTC | Danlad Nuhu 52' | Report | | Stadium: Tuba Astro Turf; Referee: Gideon Nii Cofie |

| 26 October 2024 | Rainmasters | 3–2 | Okor Nowomi | Prampram |
| 15:00 UTC | Dickson Afoakwa 36, 45'; Agyemang Yaw 45+2' | Report | Rapheal Dodzi Abayateye 25'; Julius Avinu 57' | Stadium: Ghanaman AstroTurf; Referee: Nana Kofi Amoah |

| 26 October 2024 | New Edubiase | 3–0 | Asekem | Obuasi |
| 15:00 UTC | Agyemang Bernard 21'; Abdallah Suleman 64'; Daniel Osafo 90+3' | Report | | Stadium: Len Clay Stadium; Referee: Osman Imoro |

| 26 October 2024 | Skyy FC | 2–1 | UCC Youngsters | Sekondi |
| 15:00 UTC | Micheal Andoh 20'; Isaac Cobbinah 80' | Report | Bernard Ababio 17' | Stadium: Sekondi Gyendu Stadium; Referee: Felix Komla Agbozo |

| 26 October 2024 | FC Nania | 2–0 | Kings Palace | Legon |
| 18:00 UTC | Desmond Tokoli 32', Weimah Ibrahim 87' | Report | | Stadium: Legon Nania Park; Referee: William Agbovi |

| 26 October 2024 | Walewale Catholic Star | 1–2 | Wa Power Sporting Club | Nalerigu |
| 15:00 UTC | Pince Gbedzo 2' | Report | Abdul Ganiu Kperihinah 3'; Israel Iddrisu 73' | Stadium: Naa Sheriga Sports Complex; Referee: Rafik Iddi |

| 26 October 2024 | Techiman Liberty Youth | 1–1 (5–3 p) | Bectero Sasana FC | Sunyani |
| 18:00 UTC | | Report | | Stadium: Ohene Ameyaw Park; Referee: Abdul-Karim Talhat |

| 26 October 2024 | King Faisal | 2–0 | Adjoafuaman | Kumasi |
| 15:00 UTC | Mohammed Tetteh Nortey 42'; Nasiru Osman Ebla 88' | Report | | Stadium: Ejius Okese Park; Referee: Bless Confidence Adjetey |

| 26 October 2024 | Danbort FC | 0–0 (5–3 p) | New Town Youth | Nungua |
| 18:00 UTC | | Report | | Stadium: Nungua Town Park; Referee: Jerry Elikem Adabla |

| 26 October 2024 | Northern City F.C. | 1–1 (5–4 p) | Real Tamale United | Tamale |
| 15:00 UTC | | Report | | Stadium: Aliu Mahama Sports Stadium; Referee: Ibrahim Yahaya |

| 27 October 2024 | Bofoakwa Tano | 0–0 (1–3 p) | Twimia Cities SC | Sunyani |
| 15:00 UTC | | Report | | Stadium: Coronation Park; Referee: Kingsford Oteng Yeboah |

| 27 October 2024 | Soccer Intellectuals | 2–2 (15–14 p) | Sekondi Rospak | Gomoa Fetteh |
| 15:00 UTC | | Report | | Stadium: Gomoa Fetteh Astrp Turf; Referee: Don Morrison Eso |

| 27 October 2024 | Semper Fi FC | 0–0 (5–4 p) | Kaistorms FC | Tema |
| 15:00 UTC | | Report | | Stadium: Nii Adjei Kraku II Sports Complex; Referee: Derrick Commey |

| 27 October 2024 | Real Bolga United | 1–2 | Wa Sore Nante | Bolgatanga |
| 15:00 UTC | | Report | | Stadium: Kurt ES Okraku Technical Centre Park; Referee: Umar Abubakari |

| 27 October 2024 | PAC Academy | 1–0 | Wamanafo Mighty Royals | Kumasi |
| 18:00 UTC | | Report | | Stadium: Mohamed Kamil Arena; Referee: Akwasi Anane-Appiah |

| 27 October 2024 | West African Football Academy | 2–0 | Accra Great Olympics | Sogakope |
| 18:00 UTC | | Report | | Stadium: WAFA Park; Referee: George Effah Sodjonu |

| 27 October 2024 | Golden Warriors | 0–1 | Okwahu United | Akim Tafo |
| 15:00 UTC | | Report | | Stadium: Akim Tafo Rovers Park; Referee: Alex Amoabeng |

| 27 October 2024 | Port City FC | 0–0 (3–5 p) | Attram De Visser | Koforidua |
| 15:00 UTC | | Report | | Stadium: Kukurantumi Ohene Park; Referee: Francis Ankrah |

| 27 October 2024 | TF Exponential | 0–0 (5–4 p) | Yapei United | McCoy Astro Turf |
| 15:00 UTC | | Report | | Referee: Oliver Tetteh |

| 27 October 2024 | Future Stars | 2–0 | Kumasi Academicals | Ejisu |
| 15:00 UTC | | Report | | Stadium: Ejisu Okese Park; Referee: Benedict Anane Oppong |

| 27 October 2024 | Swedru All Blacks | 0–0 (1–4 p) | Elmina Sharks | Agona Swedru |
| 15:00 UTC | | Report | | Stadium: Swedru Stadium; Referee: Righteous Owusu |

| 27 October 2024 | Nzema Kotoko | 1–1 (4–3 p) | Fettehman United | Nkroful |
| 15:00 UTC | | Report | | Stadium: Ampain AAK II Sports Arena; Referee: Hashimiwu Kere Issifu |

| 27 October 2024 | Hohoe United | 1–1 (4–5 p) | Kotoku Shining Stars | Hohoe |
| 15:00 UTC | | Report | | Stadium: Hohoe Sports Stadium; Referee: Godfred Kegyah |

| 27 October 2024 | Debidebi United | 5–1 | Dormaa Nkyenkyenkye | Sunyani |
| 15:00 UTC | | Report | | Stadium: Debidebi Presby Park; Referee: Foster Bastiours Nkuenyenutsu |

| 27 October 2024 | Bis Paradise SC | 0–1 | Sekondi Eleven Wise | Sekondi |
| 15:00 UTC | | Report | | Stadium: Sekondi Gyendu Stadium; Referee: Frederick Samena |

| 27 October 2024 | Kwahu Rangers | 0–2 | True Democracy | Legon |
| 15:00 UTC | | Report | | Stadium: Agormanya RC Park; Referee: Collins Emmanuel Acquah |

| 27 October 2024 | Agbozume Weavers | 2–2 (4–3 p) | Akatsi All Stars | Agbozume |
| 15:00 UTC | | Report | | Stadium: Agbozume Somey SHS Park; Referee: Akakpo James Kodzo |

| 27 October 2024 | Boresa FC Yapei | 4–2 | Toende | Buipe |
| 15:00 UTC | | Report | | Stadium: Buipe Astro Turf; Referee: Abubakar Kasaabator Hakeem |

| 27 October 2024 | Eleven Wonders | 2–2 (4–3 p) | Nsuatre FC | Sunyani |
| 15:00 UTC | | Report | | Stadium: Ohene Ameyaw Park; Referee: Bless Yao Selorm |

| 27 October 2024 | Emmanuel City Football Academy | 1–1 (2–4 p) | Home Stars FC | Madina |
| 15:00 UTC | | Report | | Stadium: Madina Astro Turf Park; Referee: Bless Yao Selorm |

| 27 October 2024 | Ebony FC | 1–3 | Sefwi All Stars | Kumasi |
| 15:00 UTC | | Report | | Stadium: Bantaman Kokoase Park; Referee: Albert Adoor Nsoh |

| 27 October 2024 | Betenase United | 0–1 | Bekwai Heroes | Cape Coast |
| 15:00 UTC | | Report | | Stadium: Dominase Astro Turf; Referee: Festus Dormefa Bewu |

| 27 October 2024 | Gap Soccer Academy | 1–1 (4–3 p) | Frienhoff FC | Kasoa |
| 15:00 UTC | | Report | | Stadium: Unistar Academy Park; Referee: Theophilus Antwi Sakyi |

| 27 October 2024 | Inter Allies | 0–2 | Na God FC | Ho |
| 15:00 UTC | | Report | | Stadium: Ho Sports Stadium; Referee: Bless Yao Selorm |

| 28 October 2024 | Kintampo Top Talent | 1–2 | KAC Soccer Academy | Sunyani |
| 15:00 UTC | | Report | | Stadium: Ohene Ameyaw Park; Referee: John Noble Koomson |

| 28 October 2024 | Kumbung Binibiem | 2–2 (3–4 p) | Real 24 Hours | Tamale |
| 15:00 UTC | | Report | | Stadium: Aliu Mahama Sports Stadium; Referee: Angelous Akurugu Adongo |

| 28 October 2024 | Dormaa Unity | 3–2 | Union Rovers | Dormaa |
| 15:00 UTC | | Report | | Stadium: Nana Agyemang Badu Park; Referee: Daniel Oteng |

| 28 October 2024 | Nsuopun Fidelity | 3–0 | Great Vision | Bibiani |
| 15:00 UTC | | Report | | Stadium: Nsenkyire Sports Arena; Referee: Ferdinand Nyani |

| 28 October 2024 | Dynamo FC Ho | 0–2 | Ghana Immigration | Ho |
| 15:00 UTC | | Report | | Stadium: Ho Sports Stadium; Referee: Joseph Pimpong |

== Round of 64 ==
| 29 November 2024 | Attram De Visser | 1–1 (3–2 p) | Okwawu United | Accra |
| 15:00 UTC | | Report | | Stadium: Tuba Astroturf Park; Referee: Akakpo James Kodzo |

| 29 November 2024 | Hakla FC | 1–1 (5–6 p) | Bechem United | Accra |
| 15:00 UTC | | Report | | Stadium: Tuba Astroturf Park; Referee: Maxwell Owusu |

| 30 November 2024 | King Faisal | 1–0 | Asokwa Deportivo | Kumasi |
| 15:00 UTC | | Report | | Stadium: Ejius Okesse Park; Referee: Kingsford Oteng Yeboah |

| 30 November 2024 | Northern City | 1–0 | Wa Sore Nante | Tamale |
| 15:00 UTC | | Report | | Stadium: Aliu Mahama Sports Stadium; Referee: Angelous Akurugu Adongo |

| 30 November 2024 | Wa Power SC | 1–0 | Tamale City FC | Tamale |
| 15:00 UTC | | Report | | Stadium: Aliu Mahama Sports Stadium; Referee: Oliver Tetteh |

| 30 November 2024 | Agbozume Weavers | 0–6 | Accra Lions | Tamale |
| 15:00 UTC | | Report | | Stadium: Aliu Mahama Sports Stadium; Referee: Joseph Pimpong |

| 30 November 2024 | New Edubiase | 0–2 | Nations FC | Sogakope |
| 15:00 UTC | | Report | | Stadium: WAFA Park; Referee: Rustum Senorgbe |

| 30 November 2024 | Acceler8z | 1–0 | Sefwi All Stars | Kumasi |
| 15:00 UTC | | Report | | Stadium: Wesco Park; Referee: James Taylor |

| 30 November 2024 | African Talent Football Academy | 0–1 | Kotoku Shining Stars | Nsawam |
| 15:00 UTC | | Report | | Stadium: Dobro Blue Skies Park; Referee: Nana Kofi Amoah |

| 30 November 2024 | Legon Cities | 0–2 | Home Stars | Legon |
| 15:00 UTC | | Report | | Stadium: University of Ghana Sports Stadium; Referee: Rita Boateng-Nkansah |

| 1 December 2024 | Techiman Liberty Youth | 3–1 | Bofoakwa Tano | Techiman |
| 15:00 UTC | | Report | | Stadium: Ohene Ameyaw Stadium; Referee: Emmanuel Otoo |

| 1 December 2024 | Hearts of Oak | 4–0 | Ghana Immigration FC | Legon |
| 15:00 UTC | | Report | | Stadium: University of Ghana Sports Stadium; Referee: Bright Apeamenyo |

| 1 December 2024 | Dreams FC | 0–0 (4–3 p) | Heart of Lions | Accra |
| 15:00 UTC | | Report | | Stadium: Tuba Astroturf Park; Referee: Hassim Yakubu |

| 1 December 2024 | Berekum Chelsea | 6–0 | Boresa FC Yapei | Berekum |
| 15:00 UTC | | Report | | Stadium: Golden City Park; Referee: Nyaabila Ibrahim Mohamudu |

| 1 December 2024 | Cape Coast Mysterious Dwarfs | 2–2 (3–2 p) | Soccer Intellectuals | Cape Coast |
| 15:00 UTC | | Report | | Stadium: Robert Mensah Stadium; Referee: Frederick Samena |

| 1 December 2024 | Young Apostles | 0–0 (5–4 p) | Techiman Eleven Wonders | Wenchi |
| 15:00 UTC | | Report | | Stadium: Wenchi Sports Stadium; Referee: Alhassan Baako Mohammed |

| 1 December 2024 | Aduana FC | 1–2 | Dormaa Unity | Dormaa |
| 15:00 UTC | | Report | | Stadium: Nana Agyeman Badu I Park; Referee: Prince Okoto Ntiamoah |

| 1 December 2024 | Samartex | 0–2 | Bibiani Goldstars | Samreboi |
| 15:00 UTC | | Report | | Stadium: Nsenkyire Sports Arena; Referee: Robert Musey |

| 1 December 2024 | Na God | 0–1 | FC Nania | Prampram |
| 15:00 UTC | | Report | | Stadium: Ghanaman Astroturf; Referee: George Effah Sodjonu |

| 1 December 2024 | WAFA | 0–1 | Golden Kick | Sogakope |
| 15:00 UTC | | Report | | Stadium: WAFA Park; Referee: Theophilus Antwi Sakyi |

| 1 December 2024 | Debidebi United | 3–0 | KAC Soccer Academy | Sunyani |
| 15:00 UTC | | Report | | Stadium: Debidebi Presby Park; Referee: Assi Ibrahim Ayaaba |

| 1 December 2024 | Mailma | 0–2 | TF Exponential | Accra |
| 15:00 UTC | | Report | | Stadium: Trumu Astroturf; Referee: Siraj Yahya |

| 1 December 2024 | Basake Holy Stars | 2–0 | Gap Soccer Academy | Anyinase |
| 15:00 UTC | | Report | | Stadium: CAM Park; Referee: Ferdinand Nyani |

| 1 December 2024 | Asante Kotoko | 2–0 | Future Stars | Kumasi |
| 15:00 UTC | | Report | | Stadium: Baba Yara Stadium; Referee: Alphonso Atiapah |

| 1 December 2024 | Nzema Kotoko | 2–1 | Medeama | Nkroful |
| 15:00 UTC | | Report | | Stadium: Ampain AAK II Sports Arena; Referee: Laud Nettey |

| 1 December 2024 | Bekwai Heroes | 0–2 | PAC Academy | Legon |
| 15:00 UTC | | Report | | Stadium: Gyamfi's Park; Referee: Ebenezer Nii Nai Abbey |

| 1 December 2024 | Skyy FC Daboase | 1–2 | Sekondi Eleven Wise | Sekondi |
| 15:00 UTC | | Report | | Stadium: Gyandu Park; Referee: Emmanuel Kweku Graham |

| 1 December 2024 | Nsoatreman | 1–0 | Techiman Heroes | Nsoatre |
| 15:00 UTC | | Report | | Stadium: Baffour Awuah Park; Referee: David Adanney |

| 1 December 2024 | Danbort | 2–1 | Vision FC | Bechem |
| 15:00 UTC | | Report | | Stadium: Nii Adjei Kraku II Sports Complex; Referee: Alex Amoabeng |

| 2 December 2024 | Real 24 Hours | 0–2 | Karela United | Bolgatanga |
| 15:00 UTC | | Report | | Stadium: Malik Jabir Stadium; Referee: Iddrisu Umar |

| 2 December 2024 | True Democracy | 2–2 (4–3 p) | Semper Fi | Tema |
| 15:00 UTC | | Report | | Stadium: Nii Adjei Kraku II Sports Complex; Referee: Franklin Akumatey |

| 2 December 2024 | Nsuopun Fidelity | 4–1 | Elmina Sharks | Samreboi |
| 15:00 UTC | | Report | | Stadium: Nsenkyire Sports Arena; Referee: Derrick Commey |

== Round of 32 ==
| 10 January 2025 | Attram De Visser | 3–1 | Kotoku Shining Stars | Accra |
| 15:00 UTC | | Report | | Stadium: Tuba Astroturf Park; Referee: Gideon Nii-Coffie |

| 10 January 2025 | Golden Kick | 2–2 (5–4 p) | Danbort FC | Accra |
| 15:00 UTC | | Report | | Stadium: Tuba Astroturf Park; Referee: Alex Amoabeng |

| 11 January 2025 | Northern City | 3–3 (5–4 p) | Wa Power | Tamale |
| 15:00 UTC | | Report | | Stadium: Aliu Mahama Sports Stadium; Referee: Nathan Amanfo |

| 11 January 2025 | Accra Lions | 0–0 (3–5 p) | FC Nania | Sogakope |
| 15:00 UTC | | Report | | Stadium: WAFA Park; Referee: Rustum Senorgbe |

| 11 January 2025 | Basake Holy Stars | 0–1 | Bibiani Goldstars | Anyinase |
| 15:00 UTC | | Report | | Stadium: CAM Park; Referee: George Mawuli Vormawah |

| 12 January 2025 | Nsuopoun Fidelity | 1–1 (2–4 p) | Medeama | Samreboi |
| 15:00 UTC | | https://www.ghanafa.org/fa-cup/fa-cup-fixtures?&WHurl=%2Fcompetition%2F1735%2Fmatch%2F329229%summary of | | Stadium: Nsenkyire Sports Arena; Referee: James Taylor |

| 12 January 2025 | PAC Academy | 2–1 | King Faisal | Kumasi |
| 15:00 UTC | | Report | | Stadium: Mohammed Kamil Arena; Referee: Prince Okoto Ntiamoah |

| 12 January 2025 | Acceler8z | 0–2 | Asante Kotoko | Kumasi |
| 15:00 UTC | | Report | | Stadium: Baba Yara Stadium; Referee: Gabriel Arhin Opoku |

| 12 January 2025 | Hearts of Oak | 3–0 | Home Stars | Legon |
| 15:00 UTC | | Report | | Stadium: Legon Sports Stadium; Referee: Mohamed Misbaw |

| 12 January 2025 | True Democracy | 0–2 | Dreams FC | Tema |
| 15:00 UTC | | Report | | Stadium: Nii Adjei Kraku II Sports Complex; Referee: Alphonso Atiapah |

| 12 January 2025 | Ebusua Dwarfs | 1–1 (3–4 p) | Eleven Wise | Cape Coast |
| 15:00 UTC | | Report | | Stadium: Robert Mensah Stadium; Referee: Mawuli Klu |

| 12 January 2025 | Bechem United | 1–0 | Nations FC | Bechem |
| 15:00 UTC | | Report | | Stadium: Nana Fosu Gyeabour Park; Referee: Emmanuel Kweku Graham |

| 12 January 2025 | Nsoatreman | 0–0 (3–5 p) | Dreams FC | Tema |
| 15:00 UTC | | Report | | Stadium: Nana Kronamanasah Park; Referee: Hassim Yakubu |

| 12 January 2025 | Debidebi United | 1–1 (2–4 p) | Berekum Chelsea | Tema |
| 15:00 UTC | | Report | | Stadium: Debidebi Presby Park; Referee: Alphonso Atiapah |

| 12 January 2025 | Karela United | 4–1 | TF Exponential | Tamale |
| 15:00 UTC | | Report | | Stadium: Aliu Mahama Sports Stadium; Referee: Abdul Latif Adaari |

== Round of 16 ==
| 21 February 2025 | Dormaa Unity | 0–0 (2–4 p) | Techiman Liberty Youth | Dormaa Ahenkro |
| 15:00 UTC | | https://www.ghanafa.org/fan cup/fa-cup-fixtures?&WHurl=%2Fcompetition%2F1735%2Fmatch%2F329240%2Fsummary%FYI | | Stadium: Nana Agyemang Badu I Park; Referee: Kingsford Oteng Yeboah |

| 23 February 2025 | Techiman Liberty Youth | 0–0 (3–4 p) | Bechem United | Wenchi |
| 18:00 UTC | | Report | | Stadium: Wenchi Sports Stadium; Referee: Kingsford Oteng Yeboah |

| 23 February 2025 | Karela United | 1–0 | Young Apostles | Tema |
| 18:00 UTC | | Report | | Stadium: Nii Adjei Kraku II Sports Complex; Referee: Rita Boateng-Nkansah |

| 23 February 2025 | True Democracy | 1–1 (5–4 p) | FC Nania | Tema |
| 18:00 UTC | | Report | | Stadium: Nii Adjei Kraku II Sports Complex; Referee: Theophilus Antwi Sakyi |

| 23 February 2025 | Berekum Chelsea | 4–1 | Northern City FC | Berekum |
| 18:00 UTC | | Report | | Stadium: Golden City Park; Referee: Gideon Nii-Coffie the only thing |

| 23 February 2025 | Medeama | 1–1 (2–4 p) | PAC Academy | Tarkwa |
| 18:00 UTC | | https://www.ghanafa.org/fa-cup/fa-cup-fixtures?&WHurl=%2Fcompetition%2F1735%Friday match%2F325570%2Fsummary%3F | | Stadium: Tarkwa and Aboso Stadium; Referee: Laud Nettey |

| 23 February 2025 | Golden Kick | 0–0 (4–3 p) | Hearts of Oak | Legon |
| 18:00 UTC | | Report | | Stadium: University of Ghana Stadium; Referee: Emmanuel Kweku Graham |

| 12 March 2025 | Asante Kotoko | 1–0 | Sekondi Eleven Wise | Kumasi |
| 18:00 UTC | Elvis Kyei Baffour 45' | Report | | Stadium: Baba Yara Stadium; Referee: Hassim Yakubu |

== Quarter finals ==
All matches of this round took place at the Baba Yara Stadium in Kumasi.

29 March 2025
18:00 UTC

| Attram De Visser | 1–1 | PAC Academy |
|---|---|---|
| | Report | Albert Amoah 81' |
Penalties
| | 4–3 |

Referee: James Taylor
29 March 2025
15:00 UTC
Quarter finals

| Berekum Chelsea | 0–1 | Bechem United |
|---|---|---|
| | Report | Albert Amoah 81' |

Referee: James Taylor
30 March 2025
15:00 UTC

| Karela United | 0–0 | Golden Kick |
|---|---|---|
| | Report |
Penalties
| | 3–5 |

Referee: Kingsford Oteng Yeboah
30 March 2025
18:00 UTC

| Asante Kotoko | 2–1 | True Democracy |
|---|---|---|
| | Report | Albert Amoah 81' |

Referee: Alphonso Atiapah

== Semi-finals ==
All matches of this round took place at the TNA Park in Tarkwa on 11 May 2025 as disclosed by the chairman of the FA Cup committee, Wilson Arthur.

26 October 2024
18:00 UTC

| Berekum Chelsea | 0–1 | Asante Kotoko |
|---|---|---|
| | Report | Albert Amoah 81' |

Referee: James Taylor
15 June 2024
16:00 UTC

| Golden Kick | 3–1 | Attram De Visser |
|---|---|---|
| Dawuud Ishaque own goal' (18); David Amuzu 23'; Bless Ege 48' | Report | Precious Yaw Gyimah 81' |

Referee: Nana Kofi Amoah

== Final ==
15 June 2025
17:00 UTC

| Golden Kicks | 1–2 | Asante Kotoko |
|---|---|---|
| Bless Ege 33' | Report | Kwame Opoku 18, 90+4' |

University of Ghana Stadium, Legon, Accra
Referee: Bless Yao Selorm
