= 2026–27 CAF Confederation Cup =

International football competition in Africa

TotalEnergies CAF Confederation Cup 2026–2027

Tournament details
- Dates: Qualification: 16 September – 26 October 2025; Competition proper: To be confirmed
- Teams: 58 (from 46 associations)
- (Note: All statistics do not include qualifying rounds)

The 2026–27 CAF Confederation Cup, officially the TotalEnergies CAF Confederation Cup for sponsorship purposes, will be the 24th edition of the CAF Confederation Cup and the 52nd overall season of Africa's secondary club football tournament organized by the Confederation of African Football (CAF).

The winners of this edition of the competition will earn the right to play against the winners of the 2026–27 CAF Champions League in the 2027 CAF Super Cup.

== Association team allocation ==
All 54 CAF member associations may enter the CAF Confederation Cup, with the 12 highest ranked associations according to the CAF 5-year ranking eligible to enter two teams in the competition. As a result, a maximum of 68 teams could enter the tournament – although this level has never been reached.

For this season's edition, CAF used the 2021–2026 CAF 5-year ranking, which calculates points for each entrant association based on their clubs performance over the 5 years in the CAF club competitions. The criteria for the points are as follows:

	CAF Champions League	CAF Confederation Cup
Winners	6 points	5 points
Runners-up	5 points	4 points
Losing semi-finalists	4 points	3 points
Losing quarter-finalists	3 points	2 points
3rd place in groups	2 points	1 point
4th place in groups	1 point	0.5 point

The points were multiplied by a coefficient according to the season as follows:

- 2025–26: × 5
- 2024–25: × 4
- 2023–24: × 3
- 2022–23: × 2
- 2021–22: × 1

== Teams ==
The following 56 teams from 44 associations entered the competition.

- Bold received a bye to the second round.
- The other teams entered the first round.

Associations are shown according to their CAF 5-year ranking – those with a ranking score have their rank and score (in parentheses) indicated.

Associations eligible to enter two teams (Top 12 associations)
Association	Rank	Team	Qualification method
Egypt	1	Al Ahly	2025–26 Egyptian Premier League third place
Egypt	1	ZED FC	2025–26 Egypt Cup runners-up
Morocco	2	Raja	2025–26 Botola Pro third place
Morocco	2	AS FAR	2025–26 Botola Pro fourth place
Algeria	3	USM Alger	2025-26 CAF Confederation Cup champions and 2025–26 Algerian Cup champions
Algeria	3	CR Belouizdad	2025–26 Algerian Ligue Professionnelle 1 third place
South Africa	4	Kaizer Chiefs	2025–26 South African Premiership third place
South Africa	4	Durban City	2025–26 Nedbank Cup champions
Tanzania	5	Azam	2025–26 Tanzanian Premier League third place
Tanzania	5	Singida Black Stars	2025–26 Tanzanian Premier League fourth place
Tunisia	6	Sfaxien	2025–26 Tunisian Ligue Professionnelle 1 third place
Tunisia	6	Zarzis	2025–26 Tunisian Cup runners-up
Angola	7	Primeiro de Agosto	2025–26 Girabola third place
Angola	7	Kabuscorp	2025–26 Taça de Angola runners-up
DR Congo	8	AS Maniema Union	2025–26 Linafoot third place
DR Congo	8	Virunga	2025–26 Coupe du Congo Champions
Sudan	9	Hilal Alsahil	2025–26 Sudan Premier League third place
Sudan	9	Al Ahli Madani	2025–26 Sudan Cup champions
Mali	10	Real Bamako	2025–26 Malian Première Division third place
Mali	10	Diarra	2026 Malian Cup runners-up
Ivory Coast	11	AF Amadou Diallo	2025–26 Côte d'Ivoire Ligue 1 third place
Ivory Coast	11	Korhogo	2026 Coupe de Côte d'Ivoire champions
Nigeria	12	Shooting Stars	2025–26 Nigeria Premier Football League third place
Nigeria	12	El-Kanemi Warriors	2026 Nigeria Federation Cup champions

Associations eligible to enter one team
Association	Rank	Team	Qualifying method
Libya	13	Al Ahli Tripoli	2026 Libyan Cup champions
Zambia	15	Red Arrows	2026 ABSA Cup champions
Ghana	16	Nations	2025–26 Ghana FA Cup champions
Guinea	17	Hafia	2025–26 Guinée Championnat National runners-up
Botswana	18	Jwaneng Galaxy	2026 Botswana FA Challenge Cup winners
Mauritania	18	Douanes	2026 Mauritanian President's Cup champions
Senegal	20	Diambars	2026 Senegal FA Cup champions
Kenya	21	Tusker	2026 Kenyan Cup champions
Cameroon	21	Panthère Sportive	2025 Cameroonian Cup champions
Mozambique	23	Black Bulls	2025 Taça de Mozambique runners-up
Togo	23	ASKO Kara	2026 Coupe du Togo runners-up
Uganda	23	Kitara	2026 Uganda Cup champions
Eswatini	26	Green Mamba	2026 Ingwenyama Cup runners-up
Niger	26	AS ZAM	2026 Niger Cup runners-up
Burundi	—	Rukinzo	2026 Burundian Cup champions
Burkina Faso	—	Vitesse	2026 Coupe du Faso champions
Benin	—	ASPAC	Benin Football Federation entrant
Chad	—	AS PSI	Chadian Football Federation entrant
Comoros	—	Atomic Ngomé	2026 Comoros Cup champions
Djibouti	—	ASAS Djibouti Télécom	2025–26 Djibouti Premier League runners-up
Equatorial Guinea	—	The Panthers	2026 Equatoguinean Cup runners-up
Ethiopia	—	Welwalo Adigrat	2026 Ethiopian Cup champions
Guinea-Bissau	—	UD Internacional	Football Federation of Guinea-Bissau entrant
Madagascar	—	Rouge	2026 Coupe de Madagascar champions
Mauritius	—	Port-Louis 2000	2026 Mauritian Cup runners-up
Namibia	—	UNAM	2026 Namibia FA Cup champions
Rwanda	—	Rayon Sports	2026 Rwandan Cup runners-up
Seychelles	—	PTL Bazar Brothers	2026 Seychelles FA Cup champions
Sierra Leone	—	East End Lions	2026 Sierra Leonean FA Cup champions
Somalia	—	Mogadishu City Club	2026 Somalia Cup champions
South Sudan	—	Al-Ghazal	2026 South Sudan National Cup runners-up
Zanzibar	—	KMKM	2026 Zanzibari Cup champions

Associations which did not enter a team

- Cape Verde
- Central African Republic
- Congo
- Eritrea
- Gabon
- Gambia
- Lesotho
- Liberia
- Malawi
- Réunion
- São Tomé and Príncipe
- Zimbabwe

== Schedule ==
CAF announced the competition calendar on 2 July 2026.

The exact dates of the final and the dates of the qualifying and group-stage draws had not been announced as of 27 July 2026.

Phase	Round	Draw date	First leg	Second leg
Qualifying rounds	First round	6 August 2026	4–6 September 2026	11–13 September 2026
Qualifying rounds	Second round	6 August 2026	16–18 October 2026	23–25 October 2026
Group stage	Matchday 1	28 October 2026	27–29 November 2026	
Group stage	Matchday 2	28 October 2026	4–6 December 2026	
Group stage	Matchday 3	28 October 2026	18–20 December 2026	
Group stage	Matchday 4	28 October 2026	8–10 January 2027	
Group stage	Matchday 5	28 October 2026	15–17 January 2027	
Group stage	Matchday 6	28 October 2026	22–24 January 2027	
Knockout stage	Quarter-finals	To be confirmed	26–28 February 2027	5–7 March 2027
Knockout stage	Semi-finals	To be confirmed	9–11 April 2027	16–18 April 2027
Knockout stage	Final	To be confirmed	9–31 May 2027 (exact dates to be confirmed)	

== Qualifying rounds ==
The draw for the qualifying rounds was held on 6 August 2026, 11:00 GMT (14:00 local time, UTC+3), at the CAF headquarters in Cairo, Egypt. In the qualifying rounds, each tie will be played on a home-and-away two-legged basis. If the aggregate score will be tied after the second leg, the away goals rule will be applied, and if still tied, extra time will not be played, and a penalty shoot-out will be used to determine the winner (Regulations III. 13 & 14).

=== First round ===
Team 1	Agg.	Team 2	1st leg	2nd leg
Mogadishu City (Somalia)	1–4	(Uganda) Kitara	1–2	0–2
ZED (Egypt)	5–1	ASAS Djibouti Télécom	4–0	1–1
Hilal Alsahil (Sudan)	3–3 (1–4 p)	(Ethiopia) Welwalo Adigrat	2–1	1–2
KMKM (Zanzibar)	0–7	(Libya) Al Ahli	0–3	0–4
Al Ahli Madani (Sudan)	2–3	(Kenya) Tusker	2–2	0–1
Al-Ghazal (South Sudan)	1–10	(Tanzania) Singida Black Stars	1–7	0–3
The Panthers (Equatorial Guinea)	5–5 (a)	(Benin) ASPAC	1–3	4–2
AS PSI (Chad)	2–4	(Ivory Coast) CO Korhogo	2–2	0–2
AS Douanes (Mauritania)	3–2	(Guinea) Hafia	2–2	1–0
El-Kanemi Warriors (Nigeria)	3–1	(Guinea-Bissau) UD Internacional	3–0	0–1
AFAD Djékanou (Ivory Coast)	3–3 (a)	(Sierra Leone) East End Lions	1–1	2–2
Shooting Stars (Nigeria)	1–2	(Tunisia) CS Sfaxien	1–0	0–2
ES Zarzis (Tunisia)	3–2	(Senegal) Diambars	3–1	0–1
Vitesse (Burkina Faso)	1–2	(Mali) Real Bamako	1–2	0–0
Diarra (Mali)	2–1	(Ghana) Nations	1–0	1–1
AS ZAM (Niger)	0–6	(Togo) ASKO Kara	0–5	0–1
UNAM (Namibia)	1–5	(Angola) Kabuscorp	0–2	1–3
Red Arrows (Zambia)	4–0	(Madagascar) Rouge	2–0	2–0
Durban City (South Africa)	3–1	(Burundi) Rukinzo	1–0	2–1
AS Port-Louis (Mauritius)	2–1	(Botswana) Jwaneng Galaxy	1–1	1–0
Panthère Sportive (Cameroon)	1–1 (a)	(Rwanda) Rayon Sports	1–1	0–0
Atomic Ngomé (Comoros)	0–1	(Mozambique) Black Bulls	0–1	0–0
DC Virunga (Democratic Republic of the Congo)	1–0	(Seychelles) Bazar Brothers	Canceled	1–0
Green Mamba (Eswatini)	0–4	(Angola) Primeiro de Agosto	0–2	0–2

=== Second round ===
The 16 winners of the second round will advance to the group stage.

Team 1	Agg.	Team 2	1st leg	2nd leg
Kitara (Uganda)	1–6	(Egypt) Al Ahly	1–2	0–4
ZED (Egypt)	1–2	(Tanzania) Azam	1–1	0–1
Welwalo Adigrat (Ethiopia)	1–8	(Libya) Al Ahli	0–4	1–4
Tusker (Kenya)	1–2	(Tanzania) Singida Black Stars	0–1	1–1
The Panthers (Equatorial Guinea)	w/o (Note: USM Alger won on a walkover after The Panthers withdrew from the competition citing financial reasons.)	(Algeria) USM Alger	—	—
CO Korhogo (Ivory Coast)	1–2	(Morocco) AS FAR	0–0	1–2
AS Douanes (Mauritania)	SR7	(Algeria) CR Belouizdad	23 Nov	27 Nov
El-Kanemi Warriors (Nigeria)	2–4	(Morocco) Raja CA	2–2	0–2
AFAD Djékanou (Ivory Coast)	1–2	(Tunisia) CS Sfaxien	1–1	0–1
ES Zarzis (Tunisia)	3–5	(Mali) Real Bamako	1–3	2–2
Diarra (Mali)	3–3 (a)	(Togo) ASKO Kara	3–2	0–1
Kabuscorp (Angola)	2–8	(Democratic Republic of the Congo) Maniema Union	1–4	1–4
Red Arrows (Zambia)	1–1 (3–2 p)	(South Africa) Kaizer Chiefs	1–0	0–1
Durban City (South Africa)	6–1	(Mauritius) AS Port-Louis	3–1	3–0
Rayon Sports (Rwanda)	2–4	(Mozambique) Black Bulls	0–2	2–2
DC Virunga (Democratic Republic of the Congo)	1–3	(Angola) Primeiro de Agosto	1–2	0–1

== Group stage ==
he draw for the group stage will be held on 28 October 2026, 11:00 GMT (14:00 local time, UTC+3), at the Egyptian Football Association headquarters in Cairo, Egypt. The 16 winners of the second round of qualifying rounds will be drawn into four groups of four.

The teams were seeded by their performances in the CAF competitions for the previous five seasons (CAF 5-year ranking points shown next to every team). Each group contains one team from each of Pot 1 and Pot 2, one or two teams from Pot 3 and zero or one team from Pot 4, and each team was allocated to the positions in their group according to their pot.

Pot 1
Team	Pts
(Egypt) Al Ahly	78
(Algeria) USM Alger	52
(Morocco) AS FAR	41
(Algeria) CR Belouizdad/ (Mauritania) AS Douanes	38

Pot 2
Team	Pts
(Morocco) Raja CA	17
(Democratic Republic of the Congo) Maniema Union	14
(Tanzania) Azam	5
(Tunisia) CS Sfaxien	3

Pot 3
Team	Pts
(Libya) Al Ahli	3
(Tanzania) Singida Black Stars	2.5
(Mali) Real Bamako	2
(Mozambique) Black Bulls	2
(Togo) ASKO Kara	2

Pot 4
Team	Pts
(Angola) Primeiro de Agosto	—
(South Africa) Durban City	—
(Zambia) Red Arrows	—

=== Group A ===
Pos	Team	Pld	W	D	L	GF	GA	GD	Pts	Qualification
1	(Egypt) Al Ahly	0	0	0	0	0	0	0	0	Advance to knockout stage
2	(Morocco) Raja CA	0	0	0	0	0	0	0	0	Advance to knockout stage
3	(Togo) ASKO Kara	0	0	0	0	0	0	0	0	
4	(Angola) Primeiro de Agosto	0	0	0	0	0	0	0	0	

First match(es) will be played: 28 November 2026. Source: CAF
Rules for classification: Group stage tiebreakers

=== Group B ===
Pos	Team	Pld	W	D	L	GF	GA	GD	Pts	Qualification
1	(Morocco) ASFR Rabat	0	0	0	0	0	0	0	0	Advance to knockout stage
2	(Tanzania) Azam	0	0	0	0	0	0	0	0	Advance to knockout stage
3	(Libya) Al-Ahli	0	0	0	0	0	0	0	0	
4	(South Africa) Durban City	0	0	0	0	0	0	0	0	

First match(es) will be played: 28 November 2026. Source: CAF
Rules for classification: Group stage tiebreakers

=== Group C ===
Pos	Team	Pld	W	D	L	GF	GA	GD	Pts	Qualification
1	(Mauritania) Douanes / (Algeria) CR Belouizdad	0	0	0	0	0	0	0	0	Advance to knockout stage
2	(Democratic Republic of the Congo) Maniema Union	0	0	0	0	0	0	0	0	Advance to knockout stage
3	(Tanzania) Singida Black Stars	0	0	0	0	0	0	0	0	
4	(Zambia) Red Arrows	0	0	0	0	0	0	0	0	

First match(es) will be played: 28 November 2026. Source: CAF
Rules for classification: Group stage tiebreakers

=== Group D ===
Pos	Team	Pld	W	D	L	GF	GA	GD	Pts	Qualification
1	(Algeria) USM Alger	0	0	0	0	0	0	0	0	Advance to knockout stage
2	(Tunisia) CS Sfaxien	0	0	0	0	0	0	0	0	Advance to knockout stage
3	(Mozambique) Black Bulls	0	0	0	0	0	0	0	0	
4	(Mali) Real Bamako	0	0	0	0	0	0	0	0	

First match(es) will be played: 28 November 2026. Source: CAF
Rules for classification: Group stage tiebreakers

== See also ==
- 2026–27 CAF Champions League
