= 2025–26 Ghana FA Cup =

46th season of the Ghana FA Cup

MTN FA Cup

Tournament details
- Country: Ghana
- Dates: 24 October 2025 – 31 May 2026
- Teams: 110; 92 (preliminary round); 64 (main competition incl. 32 qualifiers)

The 2025–26 Ghana FA Cup was the 46th season of the Ghana FA Cup, the primary knockout competition in Ghanaian football. Sponsored by MTN for the 16th straight season and known as the MTN FA Cup for sponsorship purposes, Asante Kotoko were the defending champions but were eliminated in the Round of 64.

== Preliminary round ==
This round took place from 24 to 27 October 2025.

25 October 2024	Givova Sporting Academy	0–0 (2–4 p)	Cape Coast Mysterious Dwarfs	Sekondi
15:00 UTC		Report		Stadium: Sekondi Gyendu Stadium; Referee: Rita Boateng-Nkansah

25 October 2024	Techiman Heroes Sporting Club Ltd.	0–0 (4–3 p)	Victory Club Warriors	Techiman
15:00 UTC		Report		Stadium: Ohene Ameyaw Stadium; Referee: Osman Dauda

25 October 2024	Lokoe Diamond FC	0–3	Victory Club Warriors	Ho
15:00 UTC		Report	Baffour Asare Nana 41'; Boateng Afriyie 73'; Thomas Anaafi 75'	Stadium: Ho Sports Stadium; Referee: Solomon Kojo Doku

25 October 2024	Asokwa Deportivo	4–2	Breman United	Kumasi
15:00 UTC	Emmanuel Armah 31'; Bernard Adu Kusi 36', 63', Miller Abeiku 45+2'	Report	Sam Ortis 16'; Joel Agyemang 81'	Stadium: Ejius Okesse Park; Referee: David Parker

26 October 2024	Tamale City	2–0	Tamale Soccer Angels	Tamale
15:00 UTC	Mikdar Ishak 51'; Abdul Majeed Mohammed 56'	Report		Stadium: Aliu Mahama Sports Stadium; Referee: Barikisu Salifu

26 October 2024	Navrongo Mighty Warriors	w/o	Malima	Bolgatanga
15:00 UTC		Report		Stadium: Paga Border Park; Referee: Abubakari Sadiq Yakubu

26 October 2024	Acceler8z	1–0	Kumasi Corners Stones	Kumasi
15:00 UTC	Abbey Ejiri 6'	Report		Stadium: WESCO Park; Referee: Juliet Appiah

26 October 2024	Golden Kick	1–0	Oda Kotoku Royals	Accra
15:00 UTC	Danlad Nuhu 52'	Report		Stadium: Tuba Astro Turf; Referee: Gideon Nii Cofie

26 October 2024	Rainmasters	3–2	Okor Nowomi	Prampram
15:00 UTC	Dickson Afoakwa 36', 45'; Agyemang Yaw 45+2'	Report	Rapheal Dodzi Abayateye 25'; Julius Avinu 57'	Stadium: Ghanaman AstroTurf; Referee: Nana Kofi Amoah

26 October 2024	New Edubiase	3–0	Asekem	Obuasi
15:00 UTC	Agyemang Bernard 21'; Abdallah Suleman 64'; Daniel Osafo 90+3'	Report		Stadium: Len Clay Stadium; Referee: Osman Imoro

26 October 2024	Skyy FC	2–1	UCC Youngsters	Sekondi
15:00 UTC	Micheal Andoh 20'; Isaac Cobbinah 80'	Report	Bernard Ababio 17'	Stadium: Sekondi Gyendu Stadium; Referee: Felix Komla Agbozo

26 October 2024	FC Nania	2–0	Kings Palace	Legon
18:00 UTC	Desmond Tokoli 32', Weimah Ibrahim 87'	Report		Stadium: Legon Nania Park; Referee: William Agbovi

26 October 2024	Walewale Catholic Star	1–2	Wa Power Sporting Club	Nalerigu
15:00 UTC	Pince Gbedzo 2'	Report	Abdul Ganiu Kperihinah 3'; Israel Iddrisu 73'	Stadium: Naa Sheriga Sports Complex; Referee: Rafik Iddi

26 October 2024	Techiman Liberty Youth	1–1 (5–3 p)	Bectero Sasana FC	Sunyani
18:00 UTC		Report		Stadium: Ohene Ameyaw Park; Referee: Abdul-Karim Talhat

26 October 2024	King Faisal	2–0	Adjoafuaman	Kumasi
15:00 UTC	Mohammed Tetteh Nortey 42'; Nasiru Osman Ebla 88'	Report		Stadium: Ejius Okese Park; Referee: Bless Confidence Adjetey

26 October 2024	Danbort FC	v	New Town Youth	Nungua
18:00 UTC		Report		Stadium: Nungua Town Park; Referee: Jerry Elikem Adabla

26 October 2024	Northern City F.C.	1–1 (5–4 p)	Real Tamale United	Tamale
15:00 UTC		Report		Stadium: Aliu Mahama Sports Stadium; Referee: Ibrahim Yahaya

27 October 2024	Bofoakwa Tano	0–0 (1–3 p)	Twimia Cities SC	Sunyani
15:00 UTC		Report		Stadium: Coronation Park; Referee: Kingsford Oteng Yeboah

27 October 2024	Soccer Intellectuals	2–2 (15–14 p)	Sekondi Rospak	Gomoa Fetteh
15:00 UTC		Report		Stadium: Gomoa Fetteh Astrp Turf; Referee: Don Morrison Eso

27 October 2024	Semper Fi FC	2–2	Kaistorms FC	Tema
15:00 UTC		Report		Stadium: Nii Adjei Kraku II Sports Complex; Referee: Derrick Commey

27 October 2024	Real Bolga United	1–2	Wa Sore Nante	Bolgatanga
15:00 UTC		Report		Stadium: Kurt ES Okraku Technical Centre Park; Referee: Umar Abubakari

27 October 2024	PAC Academy	1–0	Wamanafo Mighty Royals	Kumasi
18:00 UTC		Report		Stadium: Mohamed Kamil Arena; Referee: Akwasi Anane-Appiah

27 October 2024	West African Football Academy	2–0	Accra Great Olympics	Sogakope
18:00 UTC		Report		Stadium: WAFA Park; Referee: George Effah Sodjonu

27 October 2024	Golden Warriors	0–1	Okwahu United	Akim Tafo
15:00 UTC		Report		Stadium: Akim Tafo Rovers Park; Referee: Alex Amoabeng

27 October 2024	Port City FC	0–0 (3–5 p)	Attram De Visser	Koforidua
15:00 UTC		Report		Stadium: Kukurantumi Ohene Park; Referee: Francis Ankrah

27 October 2024	TF Exponential	0–0 (5–4 p)	Yapei United	McCoy Astro Turf
15:00 UTC		Report		Referee: Oliver Tetteh

27 October 2024	Future Stars	2–0	Kumasi Academicals	Ejisu
15:00 UTC		Report		Stadium: Ejisu Okese Park; Referee: Benedict Anane Oppong

27 October 2024	Swedru All Blacks	0–0 (1–4 p)	Elmina Sharks	Agona Swedru
15:00 UTC		Report		Stadium: Swedru Stadium; Referee: Righteous Owusu

27 October 2024	Nzema Kotoko	1–1 (4–3 p)	Fettehman United	Nkroful
15:00 UTC		Report		Stadium: Ampain AAK II Sports Arena; Referee: Hashimiwu Kere Issifu

27 October 2024	Hohoe United	1–1 (4–5 p)	Kotoku Shining Stars	Hohoe
15:00 UTC		Report		Stadium: Hohoe Sports Stadium; Referee: Godfred Kegyah

27 October 2024	Debidebi United	5–1	Dormaa Nkyenkyenkye	Sunyani
15:00 UTC		Report		Stadium: Debidebi Presby Park; Referee: Foster Bastiours Nkuenyenutsu

27 October 2024	Bis Paradise SC	0–1	Sekondi Eleven Wise	Sekondi
15:00 UTC		Report		Stadium: Sekondi Gyendu Stadium; Referee: Frederick Samena

27 October 2024	Kwahu Rangers	0–2	True Democracy	Legon
15:00 UTC		Report		Stadium: Agormanya RC Park; Referee: Collins Emmanuel Acquah

27 October 2024	Agbozume Weavers	2–2 (4–3 p)	Akatsi All Stars	Agbozume
15:00 UTC		Report		Stadium: Agbozume Somey SHS Park; Referee: Akakpo James Kodzo

27 October 2024	Boresa FC Yapei	4–2	Toende	Buipe
15:00 UTC		Report		Stadium: Buipe Astro Turf; Referee: Abubakar Kasaabator Hakeem

27 October 2024	Eleven Wonders	2–2 (4–3 p)	Nsuatre FC	Sunyani
15:00 UTC		Report		Stadium: Ohene Ameyaw Park; Referee: Bless Yao Selorm

27 October 2024	Emmanuel City Football Academy	1–1 (2–4 p)	Home Stars FC	Madina
15:00 UTC		Report		Stadium: Madina Astro Turf Park; Referee: Bless Yao Selorm

27 October 2024	Ebony FC	1–3	Sefwi All Stars	Kumasi
15:00 UTC		Report		Stadium: Bantaman Kokoase Park; Referee: Albert Adoor Nsoh

27 October 2024	Betenase United	0–1	Bekwai Heroes	Cape Coast
15:00 UTC		Report		Stadium: Dominase Astro Turf; Referee: Festus Dormefa Bewu

27 October 2024	Gap Soccer Academy	1–1 (4–3 p)	Frienhoff FC	Kasoa
15:00 UTC		Report		Stadium: Unistar Academy Park; Referee: Theophilus Antwi Sakyi

27 October 2024	Inter Allies	0–2	Na God FC	Ho
15:00 UTC		Report		Stadium: Ho Sports Stadium; Referee: Bless Yao Selorm

28 October 2024	Kintampo Top Talent	1–2	KAC Soccer Academy	Sunyani
15:00 UTC		Report		Stadium: Ohene Ameyaw Park; Referee: John Noble Koomson

28 October 2024	Kumbung Binibiem	2–2 (3–4 p)	Real 24 Hours	Tamale
15:00 UTC		Report		Stadium: Aliu Mahama Sports Stadium; Referee: Angelous Akurugu Adongo

28 October 2024	Dormaa Unity	3–2	Union Rovers	Dormaa
15:00 UTC		Report		Stadium: Nana Agyemang Badu Park; Referee: Daniel Oteng

28 October 2024	Nsuopun Fidelity	3–0	Great Vision	Bibiani
15:00 UTC		Report		Stadium: Nsenkyire Sports Arena; Referee: Ferdinand Nyani

28 October 2024	Dynamo FC Ho	0–2	Ghana Immigration	Ho
15:00 UTC		Report		Stadium: Ho Sports Stadium; Referee: Joseph Pimpong

28 October 2024	Dynampo FC Ho	0–2	Ghana Immigration	Ho
15:00 UTC		Report		Stadium: Ho Sports Stadium; Referee: Joseph Pimpong

28 October 2024	Dynamo FC Ho	0–2	Ghana Immigration	Ho
15:00 UTC		Report		Stadium: Ho Sports Stadium; Referee: Joseph Pimpong

28 October 2024	Dynamo FC Ho	0–2	Ghana Immigration	Ho
15:00 UTC		Report		Stadium: Ho Sports Stadium; Referee: Joseph Pimpong

28 October 2024	Dynamo FC Ho	0–2	Ghana Immigrating 7on	Ho
15:00 UTC		Report		Stadium: Ho Sports Stadium; Referee: Joseph Pimpong

28 October 2024	Dynamo FC Ho	0–2	Ghana Immigration	Ho
15:00 UTC		Report		Stadium: Ho Sports Stadium; Referee: Joseph Pimpong

== Round of 16 ==
The Ghana Football Association announced the closing road map on 2 February 2026, consisting of the Round of 16, quarter-finals, semi-finals and the final stages and their dates and kick off times. They also confirmed the venues for the Round of 16 stage, which would be held between 6 and 8 February 2026.

6 February 2026	Attram De Visser	4–0	Eleven Wonders	Tema
15:00 UTC		Report		Stadium: Nii Adjei Kraku Sports Complex; Referee: Dr. Imoro Osman

7 February 2026	Nations FC	2–1	Swedru All Blacks	Kumasi
15:00 UTC		Report		Stadium: Dr. Kwame Kyei Sports Complex; Referee: Gideon Nii-Cofie

7 February 2026	Medeama	0–0 (4–2 p)	Samartex	Tarkwa
19:00 UTC		Report		Stadium: TNA Stadium; Referee: Jacob Aduntera

8 February 2026	True Life FC	2–3	Heart of Lions	Berekum
19:00 UTC		Report		Stadium: Nii Adjei Kraku Sports Complex; Referee: Rita Boateng Nkansah

8 February 2026	Berekum Chelsea	0–3	Tamale City FC	Berekum
19:00 UTC		Report		Stadium: Golden City Park; Referee: Rejoice Addokwei

8 February 2026	Dreams FC	4–2	Inter Allies	Accra
15:00 UTC		Report		Stadium: Tuba AstroTurf Park; Referee: Maxwell Owusu

8 February 2026	Asante Kotoko	0–0 (2–4 p)	Aduana FC	Kumasi
19:00 UTC		Report		Stadium: Baba Yara Stadium; Referee: Sumaila Nazeef

8 February 2026	Techiman Liberty Youth	3–0	Real Tamale United	Techiman
15:00 UTC		Report		Stadium: Ohene Ameyaw Park; Referee: Foster Bastiours

== Quarter-finals ==
The Ghana Football Association announced on 5 March 2026 that the Cape Coast Stadium and Nana Fosu Gyeabour Park, the latter in Berekum, would host the quarter finals. A few days later, they clarified that Aduana FC v Techiman Liberty Youth and Nations FC v Berekum Chelsea matches would take place in Berekum, with the other two matches to take place in Cape Coast.

15 March 2026	Aduana FC	3–0	Techiman Liberty Youth	Berekum
15:00 UTC		Report		Stadium: Nana Fosu Gyeabour Park

14 March 2026	Nations FC	0–0 (4-3 p)	Berekum Chelsea	Berekum
15:00 UTC		Report		Stadium: Nana Fosu Gyeabour Park

15 March 2026	Dreams FC	1–1 (4–3 p)	Heart of Lions	Cape Coast
15:00 UTC		Report		Stadium: Cape Coast Sports Stadium

15 March 2026	Attram De Visser	0–3	Medeama	Cape Coast
19:00 UTC		Report		Stadium: Cape Coast Sports Stadium

== Semi-finals ==
The Ghana Football Association announced that the Swedru Sports Stadium will host the semi-finals below; one on the 17th and the other on the 18th of April.

17 April 2026

Nations FC	1–0	Aduana

18 April 2026

Dreams FC	3–2	Medeama

== Final ==
31 May 2026
18:00 UTC

Dreams FC	1-1 (4-5 p)	Nations FC

University of Ghana Sports Stadium, Legon
Referee: Bless Yao Selorm
