= 2026–27 CAF Confederation Cup group stage =

International football competition in Africa

- Dates: 27 November 2026 – 24 January 2027

The 2026–27 CAF Confederation Cup group stage will begin on 27 November 2026 and end on 24 January 2027. 16 teams will compete in the group stage to decide the eight places in the knockout stage of the 2026–27 CAF Confederation Cup.

== Draw ==
he draw for the group stage will be held on 28 October 2026, 11:00 GMT (14:00 local time, UTC+3), at the Egyptian Football Association headquarters in Cairo, Egypt. The 16 winners of the second round of qualifying rounds will be drawn into four groups of four.

The teams were seeded by their performances in the CAF competitions for the previous five seasons (CAF 5-year ranking points shown next to every team). Each group contains one team from each of Pot 1 and Pot 2, one or two teams from Pot 3 and zero or one team from Pot 4, and each team was allocated to the positions in their group according to their pot.

Pot 1
Team	Pts
(Egypt) Al Ahly	78
(Algeria) USM Alger	52
(Morocco) AS FAR	41
(Algeria) CR Belouizdad/ (Mauritania) AS Douanes	38

Pot 2
Team	Pts
(Morocco) Raja CA	17
(Democratic Republic of the Congo) Maniema Union	14
(Tanzania) Azam	5
(Tunisia) CS Sfaxien	3

Pot 3
Team	Pts
(Libya) Al Ahli	3
(Tanzania) Singida Black Stars	2.5
(Mali) Real Bamako	2
(Mozambique) Black Bulls	2
(Togo) ASKO Kara	2

Pot 4
Team	Pts
(Angola) Primeiro de Agosto	—
(South Africa) Durban City	—
(Zambia) Red Arrows	—

== Format ==
In the group stage, each group will be played on a home-and-away round-robin basis. The winners and runners-up of each group will advance to the quarter-finals of the knockout stage.

=== Tiebreakers ===
The teams will be ranked according to points (3 points for a win, 1 point for a draw, 0 points for a loss). If tied on points, tiebreakers will be applied in the following order (Regulations III. 20 & 21):

1. Points in head-to-head matches among tied teams;
2. Goal difference in head-to-head matches among tied teams;
3. Goals scored in head-to-head matches among tied teams;
4. Away goals scored in head-to-head matches among tied teams;
5. If more than two teams are tied, and after applying all head-to-head criteria above, a subset of teams will still be tied, all head-to-head criteria above will be reapplied exclusively to this subset of teams;
6. Goal difference in all group matches;
7. Goals scored in all group matches;
8. Away goals scored in all group matches;
9. Drawing of lots.

== Schedule ==
The schedule of each matchday will be as follows.

Matchday	Dates	Matches
Matchday 1	27–29 November 2026	Team 1 vs. Team 4, Team 2 vs. Team 3
Matchday 2	4–6 December 2026	Team 3 vs. Team 1, Team 4 vs. Team 2
Matchday 3	18–20 December 2026	Team 4 vs. Team 3, Team 1 vs. Team 2
Matchday 4	8–10 January 2027	Team 3 vs. Team 4, Team 2 vs. Team 1
Matchday 5	15–17 January 2027	Team 4 vs. Team 1, Team 3 vs. Team 2
Matchday 6	22–24 January 2027	Team 1 vs. Team 3, Team 2 vs. Team 4

== Groups ==
All times are local.

=== Group A ===
Pos	Team	Pld	W	D	L	GF	GA	GD	Pts	Qualification	AHL	RCA	ASK	CPA
1	(Egypt) Al Ahly	0	0	0	0	0	0	0	0	Advance to knockout stage	—	20 Dec	24 Jan	29 Nov
2	(Morocco) Raja CA	0	0	0	0	0	0	0	0	Advance to knockout stage	10 Jan	—	29 Nov	24 Jan
3	(Togo) ASKO Kara	0	0	0	0	0	0	0	0		6 Dec	17 Jan	—	10 Jan
4	(Angola) Primeiro de Agosto	0	0	0	0	0	0	0	0		17 Jan	6 Dec	20 Dec	—

First match(es) will be played: 27 November 2026. Source: CAF
Rules for classification: Group stage tiebreakers
28 November 2026
20:00 UTC+1

Raja CA (Morocco)	v	(Togo) ASKO Kara
	Report

Stade Mohammed V, Casablanca
29 November 2026
18:00 UTC+2

Al Ahly (Egypt)	v	(Angola) Primeiro de Agosto
	Report

Cairo International Stadium, Cairo
Referee: Abdou Mefire (Cameroon)

5 December 2026
17:00 UTC+1

Primeiro de Agosto (Angola)	v	(Morocco) Raja CA
	Report

11 November Stadium, Luanda
6 December 2026
14:00 UTC+0

ASKO Kara (Togo)	v	(Egypt) Al Ahly
	Report

Kégué Stadium, Lomé
Referee: Hillary Hambaba (Zambia)

18–20 December 2026
--:-- UTC+1

Primeiro de Agosto (Angola)	v	(Togo) ASKO Kara
	Report

11 November Stadium, Luanda
18–20 December 2026
--:-- UTC+2

Al Ahly (Egypt)	v	(Morocco) Raja CA
	Report

Cairo International Stadium, Cairo

8–10 January 2027
--:-- UTC+0

ASKO Kara (Togo)	v	(Angola) Primeiro de Agosto
	Report

Kégué Stadium, Lomé
8–10 January 2027
--:-- UTC+1

Raja CA (Morocco)	v	(Egypt) Al Ahly
	Report

Stade Mohammed V, Casablanca

15–17 January 2027
--:-- UTC+1

Primeiro de Agosto (Angola)	v	(Egypt) Al Ahly
	Report

11 November Stadium, Luanda
15–17 January 2027
--:-- UTC+0

ASKO Kara (Togo)	v	(Morocco) Raja CA
	Report

Kégué Stadium, Lomé

22–24 January 2027
--:--

Al Ahly (Egypt)	v	(Togo) ASKO Kara
	Report

Cairo International Stadium, Cairo
22–24 January 2027
--:-- UTC+1

Raja CA (Morocco)	v	(Angola) Primeiro de Agosto
	Report

Stade Mohammed V, Casablanca

=== Group B ===
Pos	Team	Pld	W	D	L	GF	GA	GD	Pts	Qualification	FAR	AZM	AHL	DBN
1	(Morocco) AS FAR	0	0	0	0	0	0	0	0	Advance to knockout stage	—	20 Dec	24 Jan	29 Nov
2	(Tanzania) Azam	0	0	0	0	0	0	0	0	Advance to knockout stage	10 Jan	—	29 Nov	24 Jan
3	(Libya) Al Ahli	0	0	0	0	0	0	0	0		6 Dec	17 Jan	—	10 Jan
4	(South Africa) Durban City	0	0	0	0	0	0	0	0		17 Jan	6 Dec	20 Dec	—

First match(es) will be played: 27 November 2026. Source: CAF
Rules for classification: Group stage tiebreakers
27 November 2026
16:00 UTC+3

Azam (Tanzania)	v	(Libya) Al Ahli
	Report

Chamazi Stadium, Dar es Salaam
28 November 2026
20:00 UTC+1

AS FAR (Morocco)	v	(South Africa) Durban City
	Report

Prince Moulay Abdellah Stadium, Rabat

5 December 2026
18:00 UTC+2

Durban City (South Africa)	v	(Tanzania) Azam
	Report

Moses Mabhida Stadium, Durban
5 December 2026
21:00 UTC+2

Al Ahli (Libya)	v	(Morocco) AS FAR
	Report

Tripoli Stadium, Tripoli

18–20 December 2026
--:-- UTC+2

Durban City (South Africa)	v	(Libya) Al Ahli
	Report

Moses Mabhida Stadium, Durban
18–20 December 2026
--:-- UTC+1

AS FAR (Morocco)	v	(Tanzania) Azam
	Report

Prince Moulay Abdellah Stadium, Rabat

8–10 January 2027
--:-- UTC+2

Al Ahli (Libya)	v	(South Africa) Durban City
	Report

Tripoli Stadium, Tripoli
8–10 January 2027
--:-- UTC+3

Azam (Tanzania)	v	(Morocco) AS FAR
	Report

Chamazi Stadium, Dar es Salaam

15–17 January 2027
--:-- UTC+2

Durban City (South Africa)	v	(Morocco) AS FAR
	Report

Moses Mabhida Stadium, Durban
15–17 January 2027
--:-- UTC+2

Al Ahli (Libya)	v	(Tanzania) Azam
	Report

Tripoli Stadium, Tripoli

22–24 January 2027
--:-- UTC+1

AS FAR (Morocco)	v	(Libya) Al Ahli
	Report

Prince Moulay Abdellah Stadium, Rabat
22–24 January 2027
--:-- UTC+3

Azam (Tanzania)	v	(South Africa) Durban City
	Report

Chamazi Stadium, Dar es Salaam

=== Group C ===
Pos	Team	Pld	W	D	L	GF	GA	GD	Pts	Qualification	C1	MAN	SIN	RED
1	C1	0	0	0	0	0	0	0	0	Advance to knockout stage	—	20 Dec	24 Jan	29 Nov
2	(Democratic Republic of the Congo) Maniema Union	0	0	0	0	0	0	0	0	Advance to knockout stage	10 Jan	—	29 Nov	24 Jan
3	(Tanzania) Singida Black Stars	0	0	0	0	0	0	0	0		6 Dec	17 Jan	—	10 Jan
4	(Zambia) Red Arrows	0	0	0	0	0	0	0	0		17 Jan	6 Dec	20 Dec	—

First match(es) will be played: 27 November 2026. Source: CAF
Rules for classification: Group stage tiebreakers
29 November 2026
15:00 UTC+2

Maniema Union (Democratic Republic of the Congo)	v	(Tanzania) Singida Black Stars
	Report

Martyrs Stadium, Kinshasa
11–13 December 2026
--:--

C1	v	(Zambia) Red Arrows

5 December 2026
15:00 UTC+2

Red Arrows (Zambia)	v	(Democratic Republic of the Congo) Maniema Union
	Report

Levy Mwanawasa Stadium, Ndola
4–6 December 2026
--:-- UTC+3

Singida Black Stars (Tanzania)	v	C1

Chamazi Stadium, Dar es Salaam

18–20 December 2026
--:-- UTC+2

Red Arrows (Zambia)	v	(Tanzania) Singida Black Stars
	Report

Levy Mwanawasa Stadium, Ndola
18–20 December 2026
--:--

C1	v	(Democratic Republic of the Congo) Maniema Union

8–10 January 2027
--:-- UTC+3

Singida Black Stars (Tanzania)	v	(Zambia) Red Arrows
	Report

Chamazi Stadium, Dar es Salaam
8–10 January 2027
--:-- UTC+2

Maniema Union (Democratic Republic of the Congo)	v	C1

Martyrs Stadium, Kinshasa

15–17 January 2027
--:-- UTC+2

Red Arrows (Zambia)	v	C1

Levy Mwanawasa Stadium, Ndola
15–17 January 2027
--:-- UTC+3

Singida Black Stars (Tanzania)	v	(Democratic Republic of the Congo) Maniema Union
	Report

Chamazi Stadium, Dar es Salaam

22–24 January 2027
--:--

C1	v	(Tanzania) Singida Black Stars

22–24 January 2027
--:-- UTC+2

Maniema Union (Democratic Republic of the Congo)	v	(Zambia) Red Arrows
	Report

Martyrs Stadium, Kinshasa

=== Group D ===
Pos	Team	Pld	W	D	L	GF	GA	GD	Pts	Qualification	USMA	CSS	BBL	RBM
1	(Algeria) USM Alger	0	0	0	0	0	0	0	0	Advance to knockout stage	—	20 Dec	24 Jan	29 Nov
2	(Tunisia) CS Sfaxien	0	0	0	0	0	0	0	0	Advance to knockout stage	10 Jan	—	29 Nov	24 Jan
3	(Mozambique) Black Bulls	0	0	0	0	0	0	0	0		6 Dec	17 Jan	—	10 Jan
4	(Mali) Real Bamako	0	0	0	0	0	0	0	0		17 Jan	6 Dec	20 Dec	—

First match(es) will be played: 27 November 2026. Source: CAF
Rules for classification: Group stage tiebreakers
29 November 2026
17:00 UTC+1

CS Sfaxien (Tunisia)	v	(Mozambique) Black Bulls
	Report

Taieb Mhiri Stadium, Sfax
29 November 2026
20:00 UTC+1

USM Alger (Algeria)	v	(Mali) Real Bamako
	Report

Stade du 5 Juillet, Algiers

6 December 2026
15:00 UTC+2

Black Bulls (Mozambique)	v	(Algeria) USM Alger
	Report

Matola Stadium, Maputo
6 December 2026
16:00 UTC+0

Real Bamako (Mali)	v	(Tunisia) CS Sfaxien
	Report

Mamadou Konaté Stadium, Bamako

18–20 December 2026
--:-- UTC+0

Real Bamako (Mali)	v	(Mozambique) Black Bulls
	Report

Mamadou Konaté Stadium, Bamako
18–20 December 2026
--:-- UTC+1

USM Alger (Algeria)	v	(Tunisia) CS Sfaxien
	Report

Stade du 5 Juillet, Algiers

8–10 January 2027
--:-- UTC+2

Black Bulls (Mozambique)	v	(Mali) Real Bamako
	Report

Matola Stadium, Maputo
8–10 January 2027
--:-- UTC+1

CS Sfaxien (Tunisia)	v	(Algeria) USM Alger
	Report

Taieb Mhiri Stadium, Sfax

15–17 January 2027
--:-- UTC+0

Real Bamako (Mali)	v	(Algeria) USM Alger
	Report

Mamadou Konaté Stadium, Bamako
15–17 January 2027
--:-- UTC+2

Black Bulls (Mozambique)	v	(Tunisia) CS Sfaxien
	Report

Matola Stadium, Maputo

22–24 January 2027
--:-- UTC+1

USM Alger (Algeria)	v	(Mozambique) Black Bulls
	Report

Stade du 5 Juillet, Algiers
22–24 January 2027
--:-- UTC+1

CS Sfaxien (Tunisia)	v	(Mali) Real Bamako
	Report

Taieb Mhiri Stadium, Sfax

== See also ==
- 2026–27 CAF Champions League group stage
