= Winfred Selorm Komla Honu =

Ghanaian footballer

Personal information
- Full name: Winfred Selorm Komla Honu
- Date of birth: 28 July 1998 (age 28)
- Place of birth: Hohoe, Ghana
- Position: Goalkeeper

Team information
- Current team: Legon Cities
- Number: 31

Youth career
- 2010–2017: NADM

Senior career*
Years	Team	Apps	(Gls)
2017–2019	Likpe Heroes		
2019–	Legon Cities	4	(0)
- * Club domestic league appearances and goals as of 14 March 2020

Winfred Selorm Komla Honu (born 28 July 1998) is a Ghanaian professional footballer who plays as a goalkeeper for Ghanaian club Legon Cities.

== Club career ==
Honu began his football career in 2010, playing with the youth sides of NADM in his hometown of Hohoe. He was a member of the NADM team that won two Volta Region Division 2 Middle League titles, in 2012–13 and 2014–15.

Honu joined Division Two League club Likpe Heroes in 2017. He was named as the man of the match during a 2018 Ghanaian FA Cup match against WAFA, although Likpe Heroes were knocked out on penalty kicks.

In 2019, Honu joined Ghana Premier League side Legon Cities. He made his professional debut on 29 February 2020, substituting the injured Fatau Dauda and keeping a clean sheet in a scoreless draw against Eleven Wonders. Honu made four appearances in his debut season with the club before the campaign was cut short due to the COVID-19 pandemic in Ghana.

2020/2021 Ghana Premier League season saw Honu making a good start in the Ghana Premier League with Legon Cities as their main goalkeeper after the first choice goalkeeper Fatau Dauda picked an injury that ruled him out for days Honu went on to play a friendly match against the National team, the Ghana Black Stars as part of their preparation for their final qualifying matches to the 2022 Africa Cup of Nations (AFCON) tournament. In March 2021, he was voted Most Valuable Player (Goalkeeper) twice in the Ghana Premier League.
