= Joseph Amoah =

Joseph Amoah may refer to:

- Joseph Amoah (footballer, born 1981), Ghana-born Liberian football player
- Joseph Amoah (footballer, born 1994), Ghanaian football player
- Joseph Amoah (sprinter) (born 1997), Ghanaian sprinter
- Joseph Amoah (footballer, born 2002), Ghanaian football player
