= Henry David =

Henry David may refer to:

- Henry David Abraham (born 1942), American physician
- Henry David Aiken (1912–1982), American philosopher
- Henry David Cooke
- Henry David Erskine (disambiguation), multiple persons
- Henry David Greene
- Henry David Halsey
- Henry David Hardington Bartlett
- Ian Henry David Henderson
- Henry David Hurst (1916–2003), American classicist and historian
- Henry David Inglis (1795–1835), Scottish travel writer
- Henry David Lee
- Henry David Leslie (1822–1896), English composer and conductor
- Henry David Lopez
- Henry David Reginald Margesson, 1st Viscount Margesson
- Henry David Martin
- Henry David Montgomery, 3rd Viscount Montgomery of Alamein
- Henry David Owen
- Henry David Thoreau (1817–1862), American essayist, poet, and philosopher
- Henry David Leonard George Walston
- Henry David Winton
- Henry David (actor) (born 1979), Israeli actor

== See also ==
- Henry Davids
