= 1997 WAFU Club Championship =

Tournament details
- Teams: 7 (from 1 confederation)

Final positions
- Champions: (Ghana) Ghapoha Readers (1st title)
- Runners-up: (Niger) JS Ténéré

Tournament statistics
- Matches played: 12

The 1997 WAFU Club Championship was the 19th football club tournament season that took place for the runners-up or third place of each West African country's domestic league, the West African Club Championship. It was won by Ghana's Ghapoha Readers after defeating Niger's JS Ténéré in the second leg. More than last season and fewer than in 1995, seven clubs took part.

== First round ==
Team 1	Agg.	Team 2	1st leg	2nd leg
Imraguens de Nouadhibou (Mauritania)	0–2	(Senegal) ASEC Ndiambour	0–1	1–0
Issia Wazi (Ivory Coast)	0–4	(Ghana) Ghapoha Readers	0–0	4–0

Ghapoha Readers directly headed to the quarterfinals

== Quarterfinals ==
Team 1	Agg.	Team 2	1st leg	2nd leg
Mamahira AC (Mali)	—	(Guinea) ASEC Ndjambour	2–1	—

== Semifinals ==
Team 1	Agg.	Team 2	1st leg	2nd leg
Katsina United (Nigeria)	0–2	(Niger) JS Ténéré	0–1	1–0
Ghapoha Readers (Ghana)	5–2	(Senegal) ASEC Ndjambour	2–0	2–3

== Finals ==
Team 1	Agg.	Team 2	1st leg	2nd leg
JS Ténéré (Niger)	1–2	(Ghana) Ghapoha Readers	1–0	2–0

== Winners ==
1997 WAFU Club Championship
(Ghana)
Ghapoha Readers
First title

== See also ==
- 1997 CAF Champions League
- 1997 CAF Cup Winners' Cup
- 1997 CAF Cup
