= Kwabena Agouda =

Ghanaian footballer

Personal information
- Full name: Kwabena Agouda
- Date of birth: 25 April 1985 (age 41)
- Place of birth: Accra, Ghana
- Height: 1.76 m (5 ft 9 in)
- Position: Striker

Team information
- Current team: Hapoel Bnei Lod F.C.
- Number: 77

Senior career*
Years	Team	Apps	(Gls)
2001–2004	Nania F.C.	67	(45)
2004–2007	FC St. Gallen	23	(2)
2006	→ FC Winterthur (loan)	15	(6)
2008	Hapoel Bnei Lod	18	(9)
2008	Hapoel Ironi Kiryat Shmona	9	(0)
2009	Hapoel Bnei Lod	16	(2)
2009–2010	Hapoel Ashkelon	3	(0)
2010	Hapoel Kfar Saba	0	(0)
2011–	Hapoel Bnei Lod F.C.		
- * Club domestic league appearances and goals

Kwabena Agouda (born 25 April 1985 in Accra) is a Ghanaian professional football striker, currently playing for Hapoel Bnei Lod FC.

== Career ==
Agouda also played for Nania F.C. (Ghana), where he scored 45 goals in 67 games, he arrived in Europe to join FC St. Gallen in 2004. In summer 2006 loaned out to FC Winterthur in the Swiss Challenge League (2nd level), his loan contract will last until the end of this year. He was a member of FC St. Gallen since joining them in 2004 from FC Nania. He scored 1 goal in 20 games.until January 2007 and in January 2008 joined Bnei Lod, after 6 months was transferred to Hapoel Ironi Kiryat Shmona F.C.
