= Ghana FA Cup =

National football cup competition in Ghana

- Founded: 1958; 68 years ago
- Region: Ghana
- Teams: 110
- Current champions: Nations FC (1st title)
- Most championships: Accra Hearts of Oak (11 titles)
- 2025–26 Ghana FA Cup

Logo used from 2010 to 2021.

The Ghana FA Cup, currently known as the MTN FA Cup for sponsorship purposes, is the annual knockout competition in Ghanaian football created in 1958, a year after the independence of Ghana. Open to all Ghanaian football clubs, the competition was put on an 8-year hiatus between 2002 and 2010.

Accra Hearts of Oak SC is the competition's most successful club, having won it 11 times, followed by Asante Kotoko with 10; the latter was claimed by beating Golden Kick 2–1 in the 2025 final.

== Winners ==
Year/Season	Winner	Score	Finalist
1958	Asante Kotoko	4–2	Accra Hearts of Oak
1959	Kumasi Cornerstones	—N/a	Great Ashantis
1960	Asante Kotoko	—N/a	Hearts of Oak
1961–62	Real Republicans	—N/a	Hearts of Oak
1962–63	Real Republicans	—N/a	Kumasi Conerstones
1963–64	Real Republicans	—N/a	Great Ashantis (Kumasi)
1965	Real Republicans	not played	Kumasi Cornerstones
1968	Ebusua Dwarfs	—N/a	Ho Mighty Eagles
1973	Accra Hearts of Oak	—N/a	Akosombo Akotex
1974	Accra Hearts of Oak	—N/a	Swedru All Blacks
1975	Accra Great Olympics	—N/a	Brong-Ahafo United
1976	Dumas Boys of GTP	2–1	Accra Hearts of Oak
1978	Asante Kotoko	—N/a	Bibiani Gold Stars
1979	Accra Hearts of Oak	—N/a	Sekondi Eleven Wise
1981	Accra Hearts of Oak	—N/a	Real Tamale United
1982	Sekondi Eleven Wise	—N/a	Sekondi Hasaacas
1983	Accra Great Olympics	—N/a	Tano Bafoakwa
1984	Asante Kotoko	1–0	Ashanti Gold
1985	Sekondi Hasaacas	2–1	Asante Kotoko
1986	Okwahu United	—N/a	Real Tamale United
1989	Accra Hearts of Oak	—N/a	Kumasi Cornerstones
1990	Accra Hearts of Oak	4–2	Asante Kotoko
1992	Voradep	2–2 (3–2 pen.)	Neoplan Stars
1993	Ashanti Gold	4–3	Ebusua Dwarfs
1994	Okwawu United	2–1	Ebusua Dwarfs
1995	Accra Great Olympics	—N/a	Accra Hearts of Oak
1996	Accra Hearts of Oak SC	1–0	Ghapoha
1997	Ghapoha	1–0	Okwawu United
1998	Asante Kotoko	1–0	Real Tamale United
1999	Accra Hearts of Oak	3–1	Accra Great Olympics
2000	Accra Hearts of Oak	2–0	Okwawu United
2001	Asante Kotoko	1–0	Real Tamale United
2002 – 2010	Not played/On a hiatus		
2011	Nania FC	1–0	Asante Kotoko
2012	New Edubiase United	1–0	Ashanti Gold
2013	Medeama SC	1–0	Asante Kotoko
2014	Asante Kotoko	2–1 (aet)	Inter Allies
2015	Medeama SC	2–1	Asante Kotoko
2016	Bechem United	2–1	Okwawu United
2017	Asante Kotoko	3–1	Accra Hearts of Oak
2018	Abandoned due to the dissolution of Ghana Football Association's architecture		
2019	Not played		
2020	Abandoned due to the COVID-19 pandemic in Ghana		
2021	Accra Hearts of Oak	0–0 (8–7 pen.)	Ashanti Gold
2021–22	Accra Hearts of Oak	2–1	Bechem United
2022–23	Dreams FC	2–0	King Faisal
2023–24	Nsoatreman	1–1 (5–4 p)	Bofoakwa Tano
2024–25	Asante Kotoko	2–1	Golden Kicks
2025–26	Nations FC	1–1 (5-4 p)	Dreams FC

=== Top performing clubs ===
Club	City, Region	Titles	Runners-up	Last title
Accra Hearts of Oak	Accra, Greater Accra Region	12	9	2022
Asante Kotoko	Kumasi, Ashanti Region	10	4	2025
Real Republicans	Accra, Greater Accra	4	0	1965
Great Olympics	Accra, Greater Accra	3	1	1995
Medeama SC	Tarkwa, Western Region	2	0	2015
Okwawu United	Nkawkaw, Eastern Region	1	3	1986
Ashanti Gold	Obuasi, Ashanti Region	1	3	1993
Ebusua Dwarfs	Cape Coast, Central Region	1	2	1968
Cornerstones	Kumasi, Ashanti Region	1	2	1965
Great Mariners	Tema, Greater Accra	1	1	1997
Sekondi Hasaacas	Sekondi, Western Region	1	1	1985
Sekondi Eleven Wise	Sekondi, Western Region	1	1	1982
Bechem United	Bechem, Ahafo Region	1	1	2016
Nsoatreman	Nsoatre, Bono Region	1	0	2023–24
New Edubiase United	New Edubiase, Ashanti Region	1	0	2012
Nania FC	Legon, Greater Accra	1	0	2011
Voradep Ho	Ho, Volta Region	1	0	1992
Dumas Boys of GTP	Tema, Greater Accra	1	0	1976
Bofoakwa Tano	Sunyani, Bono Region	0	2	
Real Tamale United	Tamale, Northern Region	0	2	
Great Ashantis	Kumasi, Ashanti Region	0	2	
King Faisal Babes	Kumasi, Ashanti Region	0	1	
Neoplan Stars	Kumasi, Ashanti Region	0	1	
Gold Stars	Tarkwa, Western Region	0	1	
Brong-Ahafo United	Sunyani, Bono Region	0	1	
All Blacks	Agona Swedru, Central Region	0	1	
Akotex	Akosombo, Eastern Region	0	1	
Mighty Eagles	Ho, Volta Region	0	1	
Inter Allies	Accra, Greater Accra Region	0	1	

== See also ==
- Ghana Women's FA Cup
