= Samreboi =

Town in the Western Region of Ghana

Coordinates: 5°37′N 2°34′W

Samreboi is a town in the Western Region of Ghana. It is approximately 6 hours drive from Kumasi in the Ashanti region.
