= 2018 Ghana FA Cup =

Tournament details
- Country: Ghana

The 2018 Ghana FA Cup was the 40th edition of the Ghana FA Cup, the primary knockout competition in Ghanaian football. Sponsored by MTN Ghana for the 18th straight season and known as MTN FA Cup for sponsorship purposes. This season was declared null and void due to the dissolution of the GFA on 9 June 2018 as one of the interventions in response to the broadcast of Number 12 documentary.

== Round of 64 ==
Sankara Nationals 0 - 8 Wa Suntaa

Mighty Jets 0 - 1 Tema Youth

Soccer Intellectuals 0 - 4 Elmina Sharks

River Plate 0 - 1 Asokwa Deportivo

New Edubiase 1 - 0 Thunderbolt

Emmanuel 0 - 1 Nania

Vision 0 - 1 Liberty Professionals

Bebeto 0 - 0 (4 - 3 P) Heart of Lions

Bolga Soccer Masters 3 - 0 Zuarungu

Bis Paradise 1 - 1 (5 - 4 P) Nzema Kotoko

Dreams 4 - 1 Mepom Vatens

Tamale City v Real Tamale

DC United 0 - 0 (5 - 4 P) Brong Ahafo Stars

Winneba United 2 - 0 Venomous Vipers

Likpe Heroes 0 - 0 (3 - 5 P) WAFA

Akatsi All Stars 1 - 0 Agbozume Weavers

Ebusua Dwarfs 0 - 1 Star Madrid

Unistar Academy 2 - 0 Suamponman

Samatex 0 - 0 (2 - 4 P) Karela

Oil City 1 - 2 Medeama

Bibiani Gold Stars 5 - 2 Enchi All Stars

Ashanti Gold 1 - 0 Bechem United

Asante Kotoko 0 - 0 (6 - 5 P) Bepong Storm

Accra Young Wise 0 - 1 Hearts of Oak

Inter Allies 1 - 0 Immigration

Kotoku Royals 3 - 1 Madina Republicans

Jeffis 0 - 2 Wa All Stars

Kintampo Top Talent 4 - 1 Unity

Berekum Chelsea 0 - 1 Berekum Arsenal

Kenyasi New Dreams 2 - 1 Bamboi City

Aduana Stars 1 - 0 Young Apostles

Eleven Wonders 3 - 1 Techiman City

== Round of 32 ==
The draw for the round of 32 was held on 5 June 2018.

Nania v Inter Allies

Kintampo Top Talent v Kenyasi New Dreams

Bis Paradise v Star Madrid

Akatsi All Stars v Tema Youth

Asokwa Deportivo v Asante Kotoko

Ashanti Gold v New Edubiase

Bebeto v Hearts of Oak

Dreams v Liberty Professionals

Eleven Wonders v Wa Suntaa

Berekum Arsenal v Bolga Soccer Masters

Karela v Unistar Academy

Wa All Stars v DC United

Medeama v Winneba United

WAFA v Kotoku Royals

Elmina Sharks v Bibiani Gold Stars

Aduana Stars v Tamale City / Real Tamale

Note: All remaining matches called off as a result of a directive from the government of Ghana.

== See also ==
- 2018 Ghanaian Premier League
