= Henry David Erskine =

Henry David Erskine may refer to:

- Henry David Erskine, 10th Earl of Buchan (1710–1767), Scottish peer
- Henry David Erskine, 12th Earl of Buchan (1783–1857), Scottish peer
- Henry David Erskine (priest) (died 1859), Scottish clergyman
- Sir Henry David Erskine of Cardross (1838–1921), Scottish military officer and Serjeant-at-Arms of the House of Commons
