= Omran Al-Tawerghi =

Libyan footballer (born 1997)

Personal information
- Full name: Omran Salem Saleh
- Date of birth: 15 February 1997 (age 29)
- Place of birth: Libya
- Height: 1.78 m (5 ft 10 in)
- Positions: Midfielder; forward

Team information
- Current team: Al-Ahli Tripoli
- Number: 20

Senior career*
Years	Team	Apps	(Gls)
2017–2023	Al-Ittihad Tripoli		
2023–2024	Abu Salim SC		
2024–	Al-Ahli Tripoli		

International career
2019–2020	Libya	3	(0)
- * Club domestic league appearances and goals

Omran Salem Saleh Al-Tawerghi (Arabic: عمران سالم صالح التاورغي; born 15 February 1997) is a Libyan professional footballer who plays as a midfielder and forward for Libyan Premier League club Al Ahli Tripoli.

== International career ==
Salem made his debut for Libya in a 1–0 loss to Tunisia on 21 September 2019.

== Honours ==
Al-Ittihad Tripoli

- Libyan Premier League: 2020–21, 2021–22
- Libyan Cup: 2018

Al-Ahli Tripoli

- Libyan Premier League: 2024–25
