= Great Mariners F.C. =

Ghanaian professional association football club

Great Mariners
- Full name: Great Mariners Football Club
- Ground: Tema Sports Stadium
- Capacity: 10000
- League: Ghana Football Leagues
Home colours	Away colours	Third colours

Great Mariners (previously known as Ghapoha or Ghapoha Readers) is a Ghanaian professional football club based in Tema. They are a currently competing in the Ghana Football Leagues. In 1997, the team won the Ghanaian FA Cup.

== History ==
It was founded in the port city of Tema with the name GHAPOHA, which would later be changed to GHAPOHA Readers. The club's name was an abbreviation of Ghana Port and Harbor Authority (GHAPOHA).

Their first major achievement was winning the Ghanaian FA Cup in the 1996/97 season after beating Okwahu United 1–0 in the final with a goal from Isaac Boakye. Internationally they won the WAFU Club Championship in 1997 and in the African Football Confederation tournaments they participated in the defunct African Cup Winners' Cup in 1998, in which they were eliminated in the second round by USM Alger of Algeria.

In 2007, the team rebranded and changed their name from Ghapoha to Great Mariners.

== Honours ==
=== Domestic ===
- Ghanaian FA Cup
  - Winners (1): 1997
- Ghana Super Cup
  - Runners-up (1): 1997

=== Continental ===
- West African Club Championship
  - Winners (1): 1997

== Performance in CAF competitions ==
- 1998 African Cup Winners' Cup: second round

Season	Tournament	Round	Club	Home	Away	Aggregate
1998	African Cup Winners' Cup	1	(Burkina Faso) ASF Bobo-Dioulasso	3-0	1-1	4-1
1998	African Cup Winners' Cup	2	(Algeria) USM Alger	0-1	0-1	0-2
