= Joseph Amoah (footballer, born 1981) =

Liberian footballer

Personal information
- Date of birth: 4 April 1981 (age 45)
- Place of birth: Accra, Ghana
- Height: 5 ft 11 in (1.80 m)
- Position: Midfielder

Youth career
- 1997–1999: Junior Professional

Senior career*
Years	Team	Apps	(Gls)
1998–1999	Young Professionals	-	(-)
1999–2000	Nania F.C.	-	(-)
2000–2001	LPRC Oilers	3	(0)
2001–2002	Ankaragücü	7	(1)
2002	Sabah FA	13	(0)
2002–2003	Göztepe	-	(-)
2003	Çetinkaya Türk S.K.	-	(-)
2003	Kaimookdam Nongjok	-	(-)
2004–2005	Persikota Tangerang	26	(5)
2005–2006	Persmin Minahasa	24	(6)
2006	Çetinkaya Türk S.K.		
2006	Panthrakikos		
2006–2007	Persiter Ternate	23	(4)
2007–2008	Gönyeli		
2008–2012	Persibo Bojonegoro	68	(9)
2012–2013	Sporting Clube de Goa	20	(0)

International career
1998–2004	Liberia	12	(0)
- * Club domestic league appearances and goals as of 13:42, 18 December 2007 (UTC)

Joseph Amoah (born 4 April 1981) is a former professional footballer who played as a midfielder. Born in Ghana, he represented the Liberia national team.

== International career ==
Amoah made his senior debut for Liberia on 2 August 1998.
