= Vitesse FC =

Association football club

- Full name: Vitesse Football Club de Bobo-Dioulasso
- Founded: 2015
- Ground: Stade Wobi Bobo-Dioulasso; Bobo-Dioulasso
- Capacity: 10,000
- Chairman: Idrissa Zagré
- Manager: Mamadou Zongo
- League: Burkinabé Premier League
- 2025–26: 10th

Vitesse Football Club de Bobo-Dioulasso, commonly referred to as Vitesse, is a Burkinabé football club based in Bobo-Dioulasso. They play their home games at the Stade Wobi Bobo-Dioulasso.

== History ==
Vitesse Football Club was founded in 2015. They competed in Burkinabé First Division in the 2018–19 season. In the 2019–20 season they won the Group B and were promoted to Burkinabé Premier League. In their debut season in the top-tier, the club finished 14th and narrowly avoided the relegation. Next season they finished 12th. In the 2022–23 season, Vitesse finished 3rd in the league.

== Managers ==
Manager	Nation	From	To
Mamadou Zongo	Burkina Faso	August 2017	present
