= F.C. Nania =

Nania
- Full name: Football Club Nania
- Founded: 1998; 27 years ago
- Owner: Maha Ayew
- Chairman: Abedi Pele
- Manager: George Lomotey
- League: Division One League
Home colours

Football Club Nania is a Ghanaian professional football club based in Legon, Greater Accra. They are competing in the Division One League.

== History ==
=== Match fixing Scandal ===
Maha Ayew, wife of Abedi Pele, who is a director and a shareholder of Nania FC sued the Ghana Football Association as well as its President, Kwesi Nyantakyi, the chairmen of the Disciplinary and Appeals Committee of the FA – Amadu Tanko and Justice Anim Yeboah respectively, asking the court to restrain the FA from rehearing the alleged match of convenience case between her club and Okwawu United.

But the sitting judge in dismissing the suit explained that an application for judicial review cannot apply to the FA, stating that such applications are applicable to public bodies and not private bodies like FA.

Maha Ayew also by her status a director and shareholder of the club according to the judges decision could not have sued the FA because she did not have a real or substantial interest in Nania FC.

The ruling stated that the three persons – Kwesi Nyantakyi, Amadu Tanko and Justice Anim Yeboah acted in their official capacity and that they couldn't have been sued in their private capacities.

A cost of 800 GH cedis each was awarded against Maha Ayew for the three correspondents while a 1,000 GH cedi cost was slapped on Nania FC.

By the latest ruling, the Disciplinary Committee of the Ghana Football Association would re-hear the case involving the demotion of Nania FC and Okwawhu United.

The Appeals committee of the FA had set aside the ruling of the Disciplinary Committee banning the clubs for their roles in playing a match of convenience and directed the disciplinary body to re hear the matter. The club was banned for One-Year in October 2007.

=== Controversy ===
Abedi Pele Ayew, Ghana's Football Maestro has been banned from participation in active football for one year by the Disciplinary Committee of the Ghana Football Association. The decision of the Committee follows the outcome of controversial Poly Tank Division One League results in which Abedi's Nania FC beat Okwahu United 31–0 while Great Mariners also beat Tudu Mighty Jets 29–0 in what most soccer lovers have described in various derogatory terms. The four affected Clubs Nania FC, Tudu Mighty Jets, Okwahu United and Great Mariners have also been fined 50 million cedis each and have all been demoted to the Ghana Division Three League. Information gathered by dellsports from the committee's sittings on Wednesday indicated that all the players and handlers of the affected Clubs have also been banned for a year.

It would be recalled that Brong Ahafo United, Advanced Stars, Akwatia Diamond Stars and Great Corinthians and others in the 1970s were given various sanctions for involving in similar allegations of match fixing.

Director and Shareholder Maha Ayew was banned in October 2008 from Football.

=== FA Cup and Super Cup ===
Nania FC beat Kumasi Asante Kotoko in July 2011 to win the reintroduced Ghanaian FA Cup and the club also went on to beat Berekum Chelsea to win the 2011 Ghana Super Cup. That feat won Abedi Pele the coach of the year and had his players winning most of the awards of the 2011 GFA awards in Ghana.

On 7 March 2012, CAF banned Nania for three years from international competition after their late withdrawal from the 2012 CAF Confederation Cup.

== Grounds ==
=== Training Ground ===
Nania FC is located at the Legon University ground, the club trains near the Legon car maintenance which is adjacent to the rugby stadium, the field is known as Legon Maintenance Park Accra Ghana.

== Honours ==
=== Domestic ===
- FA Cup
  - Winners (1): 2011
- Ghana Super Cup
  - Winners (1): 2011

=== International ===
- E. K. Nayanar Memorial Football Gold Cup
  - Winners (1): 2007

== Notable players ==
- Andre Ayew
- Jordan Ayew
- Ibrahim Ayew
- Ahmed Barusso
- Lee Addy
- Kwabena Agouda
- Collins Addo
- Kennedy Asamoah
- Addison Ayitey
- Tekyie Mensah
- Yaw Agyei
- (Liberia) Joseph Amoah
