= Stade Wobi Bobo-Dioulasso =

Stadium in Burkina Faso

Coordinates: 11°10′55″N 4°17′49″W

Stade Wobi Bobo-Dioulasso is a multi-use stadium in Bobo-Dioulasso, Burkina Faso. It is currently used mostly for football matches and is the home stadium of Union Sportive du Foyer de la Régie Abidjan-Niger. The stadium holds 10,000 people.
