= Legon Sports Stadium =

Stadium in Accra, Ghana

Coordinates: 5.6391°N 0.1801°W

The Legon Sports Stadium, officially known as the University of Ghana Sports Stadium, is a stadium at the University of Ghana. It was completed in preparation for the 2023 African Games, and has a capacity of 11,000-seats.
