= Akim Tafo =

Akyem/Akim Tafo
- Urban area
- Nickname: Tafo Awansa
- Location within Ghana
- Coordinates: 6°13′19″N 0°21′56″W
- Country: Ghana
- Region: Eastern Region
- District: Abuakwa North
- Time zone: GMT
  - Summer (DST): GMT

Akim Tafo is a town in the Abuakwa North Municipality of the Eastern Region of Ghana

== Further developments ==
The headquarters of the cocoa research Institute of Ghana is in the Eastern Region

== Location ==
Akyem/Akim Tafo is just before Kukurantumi on the Koforidua-Bunso highway. It shares boundary with Kukruantumi, Maase, Anyinasi and Osiem.

== Chief ==
Osabarima Adusei Peasah IV
