= DC Virunga =

- Full name: Daring Club Virunga
- Nicknames: Les Montagnards (The Mountaineers)
- Founded: 1964
- Ground: Stade de l'Unité; Goma, DR Congo
- Capacity: 10,000
- League: Linafoot Ligue 2

Daring Club Virunga is a Congolese football club based in Goma, North Kivu province and currently playing in the Linafoot Ligue 2, the second level of the Congolese football.

== History ==
DC Virunga was founded in 1964.

== Ground ==
The club plays its home games at 10,000 capacity Stade de l'Unité in Goma.

== Honours ==
- Coupe du Congo
  - Runner-up (1): 2008
  - Winners (1): 2026
- Nord-Kivu Provincial League (LIFNOKI)
  - Winners (3): 2006, 2008, 2010
