= Mamadou Konaté Stadium =

Stadium in Bamako, Mali

- Location within Mali
- Full name: Stade Mamadou Konaté
- Former names: Stade de Ntomikorobougou; Stade Bouvier (1954-1961)
- Location: Bamako, Mali
- Coordinates: 12°39′14″N 8°00′55″W
- Capacity: 5,500
- Surface: Artificial turf

Construction
- Groundbreaking: 1952
- Opened: 1954
- Renovated: 2009, 2023

Tenants
- Stade Malien; Djoliba

Mamadou Konaté Stadium is a multipurpose stadium located in Bamako, Mali.

== History ==
The stadium was built in 1954 during the French Soudan era and was known as the Ntomikorobougou Stadium, it was later renovated and renamed Stade Bouvier, named after a French missionary priest, Georges Bouvier. After independence, it was given its current name after independence activist, Mamadou Konaté.

In 2009, the stadium was reconstructed with mostly the redevelopment of the west stand and lightings. In 2024, the stadium was once again re-opened after being closed in 2023 for reconstruction purposes.

With a capacity of 5,500 seats reduced from 10,000, it includes a football field, a handball court and a basketball court.
