= Al-Ghazala SC =

- Full name: Al-Ghazala SC Wau
- Founded: 2009; 17 years ago
Home colours

Al-Ghazala SC Wau is a South Sudanese football club based in Wau, South Sudan, that competes in the South Sudan Football Championship.

== Honours ==
- South Sudan National Cup
  - Runners-up (1 time): 2014

== Performance in CAF competitions ==
- CAF Confederation Cup (1 appearance)

2015 – TBD
