= Ho Sports Stadium =

Sports venue in Ho, Ghana

Coordinates: 6.6018°N 0.4664°E

Ho Sports Stadium is a stadium in Ho, Ghana. It has 5,000 seats and is home to International Allies F.C. and Vora Sporting Club.
