= Jindo =

Jindo may refer to:

== People ==
- Mai Jindo (born 1942) laborer woman from Tando Bahawal
- Jindo Morishita (森下 仁道; born 1995), Japanese footballer

== Place ==
- Jindo County, a South Korean county, consisting largely of Jindo Island
- Jindo Island, a South Korean island

== Others ==
- Jindo (TV series), Pakistani television series
- Jindo–Jeju HVDC system, a 105 km HVDC submarine cable connection
- Jindo Gim clan, one of the Korean clans
- Korean Jindo, a breed of dog indigenous to Jindo Island
