= George Ansong =

Ghanaian professional footballer

Personal information
- Birth name: George William Ansong
- Date of birth: 6 July 1998 (age 28)
- Place of birth: Ghana
- Position: Midfielder

Team information
- Current team: Liberty Professionals
- Number: 12

Senior career*
Years	Team	Apps	(Gls)
2017–	Liberty Professionals	43	(5)
- * Club domestic league appearances and goals as of 7 September 2021

George William Ansong (born 6 July 1998) is a Ghanaian professional footballer who plays as midfielder for Liberty Professionals.

== Career ==
Ansong started his career with Dansoman-based team Liberty Professionals in 2017. He made his debut on 26 April 2017, by coming on in the 72nd minute of a 2–1 loss to West African Football Academy. He had his breakout season during the 2019 GFA Normalization Competition. During the competition, he scored his debut goal on 15 May 2019, by scoring via an assist from Elvis Kyei Baffour in a 2–0 victory over International Allies, he also provided the assist to the second goal of the match. The following two games, the final two matches of the season, he provided an assist in each match to Kyei Baffour this time to help Liberty to victories over Cape Coast Ebusua Dwarfs and West African Football Academy. He ended the competition with ten appearances, one goal and three assists.

On 12 March 2020, he scored a brace in 3–2 loss to International Allies. Ansong served as the club captain during the 2020–21 season, with George Amoako stepping when he was unavailable. He scored his only goal in the 2020–21 season, in the opening day match against Bechem United by scoring Liberty's first goal of the season via a cross from Abraham Wayo to help Liberty a 1–1 draw. He was adjudged the man of the match at the end of the full duration.
