= Nicholas Gyan =

Ghanaian professional footballer

Personal information
- Date of birth: 14 May 1989 (age 37)
- Place of birth: Accra, Ghana
- Positions: Midfielder; winger

Team information
- Current team: Singida Fountain Gate
- Number: 11

Senior career*
Years	Team	Apps	(Gls)
2012–2017	Ebusua Dwarfs		
2017–2019	Simba		
2020–2021	Legon Cities		
2021–	Singida Fountain Gate		
- * Club domestic league appearances and goals as of 31 October 2021

Nicholas Gyan (born 14 May 1989) is a Ghanaian footballer who plays as a midfielder or winger for Singida Fountain Gate a Tanzanian Premier League team. He previously played for Ghanaian Premier League sides Legon Cities FC and Ebusua Dwarfs. In 2017, he played 25 league matches and scored 11 goals helping Dwarfs to a 4th-place finish.

He secured a deal to Simba SC in Tanzania, where he won the Tanzanian Premier League back-to-back in the 2017–18, 2018–19 seasons. At the international level, he was a member of the Black Stars B team in 2017.

== Career ==
=== Ebusua Dwarfs ===
Gyan played for Cape coast based team Ebusua Dwarfs in 2012 to 2017. On 4 May 2016, he became the first player to score at the Cape Coast Sports Stadium when scored for his side in 1–1 draw against their fierce rivals Venomous Vipers as a part of an official opening of the stadium. He played 28 league matches and scored 6 goals during the 2016 Ghana Premier League season. He served as captain for the side in 2017. During the 2017 Ghana Premier League season, he played 25 league matches and scored 11 goals helping Dwarfs to a 4th-place finish.

=== Simba SC ===
Gyan moved to Tanzanian league giants Simba S.C. in 2017. He played for the club from 2017 to 2019. During his time with the club he won two league titles in both seasons, in 2017–18 season and 2018–19 season. He also competed for the club in the CAF Champions League and the CAF Confederation Cup. He left the club after his contract with the club expired in 2019. He was linked with a move to Black Leopards F.C., as the team showed interest in signing him after his contract with Simba expired. He later went on a trial with the club but was not offered a contract. He went further ahead for another trial with Baroka F.C.

=== Legon Cities ===
In December 2019, Gyan signed for Dormaa-based side Aduana Stars. However, his deal with the club later fell through and he joined Accra-based club Legon Cities in March 2020 on a two-year deal ahead of the 2020–21 Ghana Premier League. He made his debut for the club on 3 January 2021, playing the first 45 minutes in a 1–0 loss to Liberty Professionals via a penalty from Abraham Wayo. After playing four matches for Legon Cities, he wrote to the club to terminate his contract, stating that he was no longer happy working with the club. The club later responded that the two parties had mutually ended their contract.

=== Diamond Trust ===
In September 2021, Gyan signed for Tanzanian Division One team Diamond Trust Bank FC as part of the team's quest of gaining promotion to the Tanzanian top-flight next season.

== International career ==
Gyan was a member of the Black Stars B team in 2017. He was a part of the call ups for the 2018 African Nations Championship qualifiers and part of the team preparing for the qualifiers against Burkina Faso before his switch to Tanzania.

== Style of play ==
Gyan is known for his versatility and his ability to play across all positions upfront. He has played in a variety of positions: though mainly starting out as a right midfielder or winger, he has also experienced game-time as a centre forward when he played for Ebusua Dwarfs in 2017, when he scored 11 goals in 25 matches. He has also featured as a second striker with a free role behind the striker as well.

Between 2017 and 2019 when Gyan moved to Simba SC, aside from being used as a winger, he was mostly being played as defender, deployed as a right-sided full-back or wing-back.

== Honours ==
Simba SC

- Tanzanian Premier League: 2017–18, 2018–19
