= Mubarak Alhassan =

Ghanaian professional footballer

Personal information
- Date of birth: 6 July 2002 (age 24)
- Place of birth: Ghana
- Height: 1.81 m (5 ft 11 in)
- Position: Attacking midfielder

Team information
- Current team: Peña Deportiva

Youth career
- Corners Babies
- 2018–2019: WAFA
- 2019: Liberty Professionals
- 2020–2021: Granada

Senior career*
Years	Team	Apps	(Gls)
2019–2020	Liberty Professionals	13	(5)
2021–2022	Conquense	27	(3)
2022	Unionistas	1	(0)
2023	ENPPI	1	(0)
2023–2024	Atlético Malagueño	4	(0)
2024–2025	Penya Independent	32	(2)
2025–	Peña Deportiva	9	(1)
- * Club domestic league appearances and goals as of 9 November 2025

Mubarak Alhassan (born 6 July 2002) is a Ghanaian professional footballer who plays as an attacking midfielder for Spanish Tercera Federación club Peña Deportiva. Alhassan started his senior career with Liberty Professionals before moving to Granada CF in 2020.

== Career ==
=== Liberty Professionals ===
Born in Aboabo, a Muslim town in Kumasi, Alhassan started his youth career in his native local club Corners Babies, a colt side known for developing young football talents. He later moved to West African Football Academy before joining Liberty Professionals F.C. in October 2019. In 2019, he was promoted to the senior side ahead of the 2019–20 Ghana Premier League season. He made his debut on 29 December 2019, playing 65 minutes of 2–2 draw against Legon Cities. On 15 January 2020 He scored his debut goal against Cape Coast Ebusua Dwarfs after converting a pass from Michael Ampadu to score an equalizer in the 73rd minute. The match ended in a 2–1 victory for Liberty Professionals after a 93rd-minute goal from Rudolf Mensah Jnr. In a match against his former club WAFA on 24 January 2020, he scored the match winner to cause an upset give Liberty a 2–1 away victory after Elvis Kyei Baffour had given them the lead in the first half. The highlight of his season came in a match against Aduana Stars, which he scored a brace and made one assist to give lead Liberty to a 5–2 victory over the Dormaa-based side. He was adjudged the NASCO man of the match at the end of the match.

He ended his debut season with five goals, five assists in thirteen league appearances.

=== Granada ===
In July 2020, he was signed by Spanish club Granada CF on a five-year deal for an undisclosed fee. He was assigned to the club's youth team and arrived in September 2020 begin his time with the Andalusian Club. He made his debut 25 October 2020 coming on the 79th minute in a 1–0 victory over CD San Félix. On 8 November 2020, he scored his debut in 3–1 victory over UD Dos Hermanas SA. In his only season with the club, he played 18 league matches and scored 3 goals.

=== Conquense ===
On 27 July 2021, Alhassan signed a one-year deal with Spanish lower-tier side UB Conquense.

== Style of play ==
For his similar creative style of play, Alhassan was given the nickname ''Aboabo Iniesta'' by Corner Babies fans in Aboabo in homage to Andrés Iniesta.
