= Dennis Nkrumah-Korsah =

Ghanaian footballer (born 1996)

Personal information
- Full name: Dennis Kodwo Nkrumah-Korsah
- Date of birth: 25 February 1996 (age 30)
- Place of birth: Ghana
- Position: Left-back

Team information
- Current team: Hearts of Oak
- Number: 45

Senior career*
| Years | Team | Apps | (Gls) |
| 2016–2022 | Ebusua Dwarfs | 95 | (6) |
| 2022– | Hearts of Oak | 35 | (0) |

International career^{‡}
| 2022– | Ghana | 4 | (0) |
| 2022– | Ghana A' | 2 | (0) |
- * Club domestic league appearances and goals as of 13 June 2023 ‡ National team caps and goals as of 10 December 2022 (UTC)

Dennis Kodwo Nkrumah-Korsah (born 25 February 1996) is a Ghanaian footballer who currently plays as a left-back for Ghana Premier League side Hearts of Oak. He previously played for Cape Coast Ebusua Dwarfs, whom he captained.

== Career ==
=== Ebusua Dwarfs ===
Nkrumah-Korsah started his career with Cape Coast Ebusua Dwarfs in June 2016. He made his debut on 26 June 2016 after coming on in the 74th minute for Francis Arthur-Mensah in a 3–0 loss to Aduana Stars. He ended the 2016 Ghanaian Premier League season with six league appearances. During the 2017 season, he established himself as the first choice left-back and played twenty-one league matches out of thirty, in process playing a key role as Dwarfs finished the season in fourth place. He played 14 league matches in the 2018 season and scored one goal, his debut goal by scoring a decisive 89th-minute goal in a match against Liberty Professionals, to help Dwarfs to a 2–1 home victory on 15 April 2018. The league was abandoned halfway due to the dissolution of the GFA in June 2018, as a result of the Anas Number 12 Expose.

In 2019, Nkrumah-Korsah was appointed as the club's captain after Joseph Amoah Mensah had served as captain in 2018. He played nine matches during the 2019 GFA Normalization Committee Special Competition his first season as captain. He played 11 league matches during the 2019–20 season before the league was cancelled due to COVID-19 pandemic in Ghana. He kept his place on the team whilst captaining the side by making the squad list ahead of the 2020–21 season. In November 2020 during the first match of the season he scored the club's first goal of the season by converting a penalty in a 2–2 draw to rivals Elmina Sharks. Dwarfs's second goal was a free-kick scored by their goalkeeper Razak Issah. On 21 February 2021, he scored a direct free kick in a 2–1 loss against Asante Kotoko. He scored another one on 4 July 2021 to help Dwarfs secure a 1–1 draw. He was named the man of the match at the end of the match.

Despite Dwarfs beating Bechem United 2–1 on the final day of the season they were relegated to the Ghana Division One League on a head-to-head record against Elmina Sharks.

He played 32 league matches, scored 5 goals and made 4 assists, ending the season as the highest scoring defender and defender with the most goal involvements (9).

=== Hearts of Oak ===
Nkrumah-Korsah joined Accra Hearts of Oak on 1 February 2022. He was quickly drafted into the first team and produced a good performance in his first match against Real Tamale United which ended in a goalless draw. He followed it with consecutive man of the match performance against Asante Kotoko and Legon Cities in the Ghana Premier league.

He played all the remaining matches of the season including the President's Cup and the Ghana FA Cup final, which he won both. He played a total of 15 league matches and 1350 minutes in the 2021–22 Ghana Premier league season. Due to his exploits in the league, he was undoubtedly among the best left backs in the country.

== International career ==
With his brilliant performance in the league, he was handed his first Black Stars call up for the double world cup qualification matches against Nigeria. He helped the team to qualify Ghana to participate in the Qatar 2022. In June 2022, he was handed a late call up to join the Black Stars to participate in the Kirin Cup tournament in Japan. He made his debut for the Black Stars by starting Black Stars first match in the tournament against Japan. He played as a left midfielder and was substituted in the 68th minute. He played the third place match against Chile where the team won through penalty shootout.

== Personal life ==
Nkrumah-Korsah obtained a Bachelor of Education degree in Health, Physical Education and Recreation from the University of Cape Coast in 2018. He was in Casely Hayford Hall of residence throughout his 4-year stay in University of Cape Coast. He was also part of the university football team. Former Black Stars team psychologist Professor Mintah introduced him to professional football by signing him to Ebusua Dwarfs whiles he was still a student at University of Cape Coast.

== Honours ==
Hearts of Oak

- Ghanaian FA Cup: 2022
- President's Cup: 2022
