= Martey =

Martey is a surname. Notable people with the surname include:

- Daisy Martey, British singer-songwriter
- Joe Martey (born 1944), Ghanaian boxer
- Nathaniel Martey (born 1976), Ghanaian sprinter
- Robert Martey (born 1984), Ghanaian long jumper
- Simon Martey (born 1990), Ghanaian footballer
- Theo Martey (born 1980), Ghanaian-American musician
