= 2017 Ghana Premier League =

First Capital Plus Premier League
- Season: 2017
- Matches: 240
- Goals: 530 (2.21 per match)
- Top goalscorer: Hans Kwofie (17)
- Biggest home win: 2 matches: WAFA 5-0 Hearts of Oak (4 June 2017); Wa All Stars 6-1 Bolga All Stars (15 October 2017)
- Biggest away win: 2 matches: Great Olympics 0-4 Tema Youth (10 June 2017); Bolga All Stars 0-4 Berekum Chelsea (23 July 2017)
- Highest scoring: 2 matches: Ashanti Gold 5-2 Berekum Chelsea (30 August 2017); Wa All Stars 6-1 Bolga All Stars (15 October 2017)

The 2017 Ghanaian Premier League is the 61st season of top professional association football in Ghana. The season began on 12 February. Wa All Stars are the defending champions coming off their first league title. The eventual winners Aduana Stars were crowned champions during a special coronation match with Berekum Chelsea. They have automatically qualified for the CAF Champions League next year.

== Teams ==
The Ghanaian Premier League comprises 16 sides, of which the bottom three will be relegated to the Division One.

== Stadia and locations ==
Location of the 2017 Ghanaian Premier League teams

Team	Stadium	Location	Capacity
Aduana Stars	Agyeman Badu Stadium	Dormaa Ahenkro	5,000
Asante Kotoko	Baba Yara Stadium	Kumasi	40,528
Ashanti Gold	Len Clay Stadium	Obuasi	20,000
Bechem United	Nana Agyemang Badu Park	Bechem	5,000
Berekum Chelsea	Berekum Sports Stadium	Berekum	10,000
Bolga AllStars	Tamale Stadium	Tamale	20,000
Ebusua Dwarfs	Cape Coast Sports Stadium	Cape Coast	15,000
Elmina Sharks	Nduom Sports Stadium	Elmina	25,000
Great Olympics	Accra Sports Stadium	Accra	40,000
Hearts of Oak	Accra Sports Stadium	Accra	40,000
Inter Allies	El Wak Stadium	Accra	7,000
Liberty Professionals	Dansoman Park	Dansoman	2,000
Medeama	TNA Park	Tarkwa	12,000
Tema Youth	Tema Sports Stadium	Tema	5,000
Wa All Stars	Wa Sports Stadium	Wa	5,000
WAFA	WAFA Stadium	Sogakope	1,000

== League table ==
Pos	Team	Pld	W	D	L	GF	GA	GD	Pts	Qualification or relegation
1	Aduana Stars	30	16	9	5	45	25	+20	57	Qualification for 2018 CAF Champions League
2	WAFA	30	15	6	9	40	19	+21	51	
3	Hearts of Oak	30	13	9	8	42	33	+9	48	
4	Ebusua Dwarfs	30	12	8	10	39	33	+6	44	
5	Asante Kotoko	30	11	10	9	23	22	+1	43	
6	Wa All Stars	30	11	9	10	36	32	+4	42	
7	Elmina Sharks	30	12	6	12	29	29	0	42	
8	Berekum Chelsea	30	12	6	12	37	35	+2	42	
9	Medeama	30	11	9	10	35	32	+3	42	
10	Bechem United	30	12	5	13	30	31	−1	41	
11	Liberty Professionals	30	11	8	11	34	34	0	41	
12	Ashanti Gold	30	12	5	13	38	36	+2	41	
13	Inter Allies	30	10	10	10	24	26	−2	40	
14	Tema Youth	30	10	7	13	30	33	−3	37	Relegation to Division One League
15	Great Olympics	30	9	9	12	27	32	−5	36	Relegation to Division One League
16	Bolga All Stars	30	2	6	22	21	78	−57	12	Relegation to Division One League

Updated to match(es) played on 22 October 2017. Source:
Rules for classification: 1) points; 2) head-to-head points; 3) head-to-head goal difference; 4) head-to-head goals scored; 5) head-to-head away goals; 6) playoff

== Positions by round ==
Team ╲ Round	1	2	3	4	5	6	7	8	9	10	11	12	13	14	15	16	17	18	19	20	21	22	23	24	25	26	27	28	29	30
Aduana Stars	1	1	1	1	1	1	1	1	2	2	2	2	2	1	2	1	2	2	2	2	2	2	2	2	1	1	1	1	1	1
WAFA	8	4	8	8	12	8	10	7	3	1	1	1	1	2	1	2	1	1	1	1	1	1	1	1	2	2	2	2	2	2
Hearts of Oak	6	9	8	3	7	5	7	4	7	5	5	3	4	3	3	3	3	3	3	3	4	3	3	3	3	3	3	3	3	3
Ebusua Dwarfs	1	8	6	12	4	10	11	8	11	10	11	8	7	7	8	6	8	4	5	7	5	7	8	8	8	9	9	8	6	4
Asante Kotoko	1	2	2	2	2	2	1	1	1	2	3	4	5	8	7	5	5	5	4	4	3	4	4	4	4	4	4	4	4	5
Wa All Stars	8	12	14	16	13	4	4	6	8	9	9	6	8	6	9	10	11	10	11	12	12	9	8	8	7	6	5	6	5	6
Elmina Sharks	8	12	12	9	11	7	7	5	6	7	7	10	12	13	10	12	10	12	14	14	14	12	11	7	10	8	7	7	10	7
Berekum Chelsea	8	10	7	7	3	9	4	8	4	4	4	5	3	4	4	7	4	6	6	8	9	11	10	6	5	7	6	5	9	8
Medeama	1	2	3	6	9	13	14	13	14	13	13	11	11	10	6	4	7	9	8	5	8	6	5	5	6	5	8	8	7	9
Bechem United	8	12	14	14	4	3	3	3	5	6	6	6	6	5	5	8	6	8	7	10	7	8	6	8	9	10	11	12	11	10
Liberty Professionals	8	5	8	3	7	5	7	10	9	8	7	9	13	11	13	13	13	13	12	9	10	13	14	13	14	14	11	11	12	11
Ashanti Gold	8	5	5	10	13	14	12	13	14	16	16	16	16	16	15	15	15	15	13	13	13	10	13	12	13	12	10	10	13	12
Inter Allies	6	10	11	5	10	12	13	12	12	12	12	12	10	9	10	9	9	7	9	6	6	5	7	11	11	13	14	13	8	13
Tema Youth	1	5	4	11	4	10	6	10	10	11	10	13	9	12	12	14	14	11	10	11	11	14	12	14	12	11	13	14	14	14
Great Olympics	8	12	13	14	16	16	16	16	13	14	14	14	14	14	14	11	12	14	15	15	15	15	15	15	15	15	15	15	15	15
Bolga All Stars	8	12	14	13	15	14	15	13	16	15	15	15	15	15	16	16	16	16	16	16	16	16	16	16	16	16	16	16	16	16

Updated to match(es) played on 22 October 2017. Source: Soccerway (in French)
= Leader; = Relegation to Ghana Football Leagues

== Top scorers ==
Rank	Goalscorer	Team	Goals
1	(Ghana) Hans Kwofie	Ashanti Gold	17
2	(Ghana) Stephen Sarfo	Berekum Chelsea	15
3	(Ghana) Thomas Abbey	Hearts of Oak	13
3	(Ghana) David Abagna	Wa All Stars	13
3	(Burkina Faso) / (Ivory Coast) Ahmed Touré	Bechem United	13
6	(Ghana) Bernard Ofori	Medeama	11
6	(Ghana) Nicholas Gyan	Ebusua Dwarfs	11
8	(Ghana) Bernard Arthur	Liberty Professionals	10
8	(Ghana) Joseph Paintsil	Tema Youth	10

Updated to games played on 22 October 2017
