= Brite Andoh =

Ghanaian professional footballer

Personal information
- Date of birth: 8 January 1999 (age 27)
- Place of birth: Ghana
- Position: Midfielder

Team information
- Current team: Liberty Professionals
- Number: 31

Youth career
- Liberty Professionals

Senior career*
Years	Team	Apps	(Gls)
2017–2019	Liberty Professionals	29	(5)
2019	AC Kajaani	23	(4)
2020–2021	Kultsu	–	(–)
2021–	Liberty Professionals	9	(1)
- * Club domestic league appearances and goals as of 7 September 2021

Brite Andoh (born 8 January 1999) is a Ghanaian professional footballer who plays as midfielder for Liberty Professionals. In 2019, he moved to Finland and joined AC Kajaani on loan, playing more than 20 matches than season and scoring 4 goals. He rejoining Liberty Professionals in February 2021.

At the international level, he has capped for Ghana at the U20 and U23 levels.

== Career ==
=== Liberty Professionals ===
Andoh started his career with Liberty Professionals. He was promoted to the senior team in January 2017 ahead of the 2017 season. On 12 February 2017, at the age of 18, he came on in the 70th minute to make his debut at the in a 2–1 league away loss to Kumasi Asante Kotoko. On 28 June 2017, he scored his debut goal by scoring the first goal in Liberty's 3–0 victory over Bolga All Stars. He ended his first season with 16 league appearances and one goal, 10 of them from the start as Liberty secured an eleventh place in the league, only four points above the relegation line.

The following season, which was the 2018 season was his breakthrough season. During the first match of the season, a home match against West African Football Academy, he scored his first goal of the season, a late consolation goal with a header in a 3–1 loss.

His second goal of the season came in a 2–0 victory over Techiman Eleven Wonders, which led Liberty to their first win of the season. He was adjudged the man of the match after that performance. During that season, his second in the Ghana Premier League, Andoh made further strides, making 13 appearances and scoring 4 league goals before the league was due to the Anas Number 12 Expose. His two other goals came in losing matches against Aduana Stars and Berekum Chelsea. At the end season, he was listed as inspiring, which resonated in his home country and Andoh topped the list of the best teenage players in the Ghana Premier League by the Ghanaian football site AlfOwusu.com.

=== AC Kajaani ===
In February 2019, Andoh went on a one-year loan to Finnish club AC Kajaani who play in the Ykkönen, the second-tier league. Only a few days later, he made his debut in the winning match against TPS Turku in the Finnish Cup. On 12 May 2019, he scored his debut goal in a 2–1 league win against MYPA. He ended the season with 23 appearances and 4 goals.

=== Return to Liberty ===
After a short stay at Finnish club Kultsu FC, he returned to his former club Liberty Professionals in February 2021. On 24 February, he made his second debut gor Liberty when he was brought on in the 57th minute for Ernest Danso in a 1–0 loss to Hearts of Oak. On 11 July 2021, he scored his first goal for the club by scoring the equalizer to help Liberty to a 1–1 draw against Hearts of Oak.

== International career ==
Andoh's performance earned him call-ups to the Ghana national under-20 team, Black Satellites in 2018 and Ghana national under-23 team, Black Meteors where he played a role in their Africa U-23 Cup of Nations qualifier victory over Togo in December 2018.
