= Kwaku Karikari =

Ghanaian footballer (born 2002)

Personal information
- Date of birth: 25 March 2002 (age 24)
- Place of birth: Ghana
- Height: 1.83 m (6 ft 0 in)
- Position: Forward

Team information
- Current team: AC Horsens
- Number: 90

Youth career
- Charity Stars
- Liberty Professionals

Senior career*
Years	Team	Apps	(Gls)
2020–2022	Liberty Professionals	32	(7)
2021–2022	→ Dreams (loan)	20	(2)
2022–2024	Jedinstvo Ub	67	(29)
2024–2026	Horsens	30	(3)
2025–2026	→ Železničar Pančevo (loan)	28	(9)
2026–	Železničar Pančevo	0	(0)
- * Club domestic league appearances and goals as of 27 July 2026

Kwaku Karikari (born 25 March 2002) is a Ghanaian professional footballer who plays as a forward for Serbian Superliga club Železničar Pančevo.

== Early life ==
Karikari was born and bred in Obuasi, a mining community in the Ashanti Region of Ghana. He played for lower-tier side Charity Stars before being poached by Ghana Premier League side Liberty Professionals, where he was assigned to the club's youth team before his promotion into the senior team in October 2020.

== Career ==
Karikari started his senior career with Liberty Professionals in October 2020. He made his debut on 22 November 2020, after coming on in the 65th minute for Razak Boame in a 2–2 draw against Elmina Sharks. In the process he scored his first competitive goal by scoring an equalizer in the 89th minute via an Emmanuel Paga assist help them salvage an away draw.

On 7 February 2021, he scored a goal that earned Liberty a 1–0 victory against his native Ashanti Gold. The win ended their six-game winless run. On 10 April 2021, he scored Liberty Professionals third goal by scoring from the spot-kick in their 4–0 victory over Elmina Sharks.

Within the season, he scored winning goals against Eleven Wonders and Karela United to help Liberty to victories and keep their relegation fight alive. In both matches he was adjudged the man of the match.

At the end of the 2020–21 season, he scored 7 goals and made 2 assists in 32 league appearances, ending the season as the club's joint top goal scorer with Abraham Wayo.

Karikari scored 13 league goals in 31 appearances for Jedinstvo Ub in the 2022–23 Serbian First League.

On 22 July 2024, Danish 1st Division club AC Horsens confirmed that they had bought Karikari, who signed a contract until June 2028. In pursuit of more playing time, Karikari was loaned to the Serbian club Železničar Pančevo in August 2025 for the remainder of the season.

In July 2026 he joined Železničar Pančevo in a transfer from AC Horsens for 600,000 euros.

== Honours ==
Individual

- Serbian First League Best Player for Half Season: 2022–23
- Serbian First League Best Foreign Player of the Season: 2022–23
