= Stanley Afedzie =

Ghanaian footballer (born 1987)

Personal information
- Full name: Stanley Afedzie
- Date of birth: December 30, 1987 (age 38)
- Place of birth: Accra, Ghana
- Position: Midfielder

Team information
- Current team: Olympic Charleroi
- Number: 26

Youth career
- 2000–2002: Liberty Professionals

Senior career*
Years	Team	Apps	(Gls)
2003–2004	Liberty Professionals	36	(0)
2005–2007	Hearts of Oak	97	(0)
2008–2009	Al-Ittihad Tripoli	40	(0)
2009	Hearts of Oak	7	(0)
2009–2010	Zrinjski Mostar	38	(11)
2010–	Olympic Charleroi	30	(0)
- * Club domestic league appearances and goals as of 3 April 2011

Stanley Afedzie (born December 30, 1987, in Accra) is a Ghanaian footballer, who currently plays for R.O.C. de Charleroi-Marchienne.

== Career ==
Afedzie began his career with Liberty Professionals F.C. in September 2005 signed than for Hearts of Oak. He left after three years Hearts of Oak to join on 8 January 2008 to Libyan Premier League club Al-Ittihad Tripoli. After only one and a half year left Afedzie the Libyan club Al-Ittihad Tripoli and turned back to Hearts of Oak on 29 April 2009, just few months later signed for HŠK Zrinjski Mostar, here played his first match on 15 July 2009 against SK Slovan Bratislava at the Champions League Qualifying 2009/2010.
