= Seidu Abubakari =

Ghanaian footballer (born 2000)

Personal information
- Date of birth: 17 December 2000 (age 25)
- Place of birth: Kumasi, Ghana
- Position: Winger

Team information
- Current team: Ebusua Dwarfs
- Number: 29

Senior career*
Years	Team	Apps	(Gls)
2019–	Ebusua Dwarfs	35	(8)
- * Club domestic league appearances and goals as of 27 August 2021

Seidu Abubakari (born 17 December 2000) is a Ghanaian footballer who currently plays as a winger for Ghana Premier League side Cape Coast Ebusua Dwarfs.

== Career ==
Abubakari started his senior career with Ebusua Dwarfs in October 2019 ahead of the 2019–20 season. He made his debut on 29 December 2019, coming on as half time substitute for Abudu Dramani in a 3–1 loss to Medeama. On 15 January 2020 in league game against Liberty Professionals, he came off the bench in the 63rd minute to score his debut goal in the 70th minute, they however lost after Liberty scored in the 73rd and 90th minute of the game. In his first start of the season on 27 January 2020, Abukari scored the first goal of a 2–1 victory over Dreams in the Ghana Premier League, before he was taken off at half time. On 11 March 2020, he scored a second half brace to help Dwarfs to a 2–1 victory over King Faisal Babes with both goals being assisted by Moro Sumaila.

After starting the season from the bench and eventually earning a place in the starting line-up, he played 13 of the 15 league matches and scored 6 goals before the league was cancelled due to the COVID-19 pandemic in Ghana.

Abubakari made his first start of the 2020–21 season during the opening day match against rivals Elmina Sharks, he played the full 90 minutes as the match ended in a 2–2 draw. He scored his first goal of the season on 23 May 2021 after he scored the equalizer in the 22nd minute. Dwarfs went on to win the match via a George Asamoah 90th-minute goal. On the final match of the season against Bechem United, with Dwarfs in the relegation zone, he scored a goal in the 20th minute to keep them away from dropping. Dwarfs won the match 2–1, however they were relegated to the Ghana Division One League on head-to-head basis against Elmina Sharks as both teams finished with 41 points.
