= Shaibu =

Shaibu is a given name and surname. Notable people with the name include:

== Given name ==
- Shaibu Atadoga (died 2020), Nigerian lawyer
- Shaibu Husseini (born 1970), Nigerian journalist and film critic
- Shaibu Iddrisu (born 2000), Ghanaian footballer
- Shaibu Mahama (born 1970), Ghanaian politician
- Shaibu Yakubu (born 1986), Ghanaian footballer

== Surname ==
- Abdalla Haji Shaibu (born 1998), Tanzanian footballer
- Ganiwu Shaibu (born 1997), Ghanaian footballer
- Haruna Shaibu (born 1998), Ghanaian footballer
- James Shaibu Barka (born 1961), Nigerian politician
- Justin Shaibu (born 1997), Danish footballer
- Mahama Shaibu, Ghanaian broadcast journalist
- Philip Shaibu (born 1969), Nigerian politician

== See also ==
- Shaibu station, station of the Shenzhen Metro
