= Gerald Arkson =

Ghanaian footballer

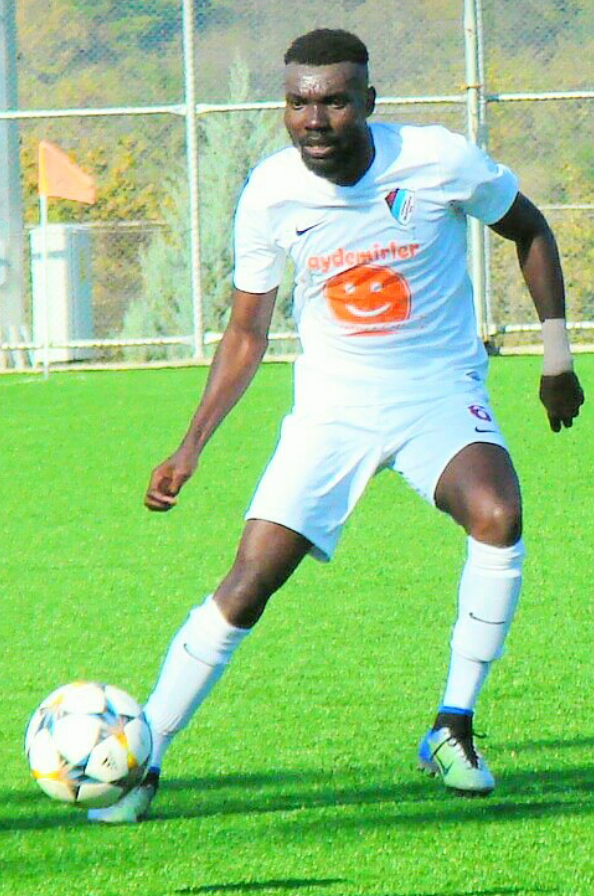

Personal information
- Full name: Gerald Arkson
- Date of birth: 22 September 1997 (age 29)
- Place of birth: Adabraka, Greater Accra, Ghana
- Height: 1.72 m (5 ft 8 in)
- Position: Midfielder

Team information
- Current team: Green Fuel

Youth career
- 2014-2015: Liberty Prof. U20

Senior career*
| Years | Team | Apps | (Gls) |
| 2015-2018 | Liberty Professionals FC | 21 | (0) |
| 2018–2019 | Kaynasli Belediyespor | 8 | (0) |
| 2019–2019 | Devrek Belediyespor | 11 | (0) |
| 2020–2022 | Liberty Professionals FC | | |
- * Club domestic league appearances and goals

Gerald Arkson (born 22 September 1997) is a Ghanaian footballer who plays as a defensive midfielder for Green Fuel in the Zimbabwe Premier League . He previously played for Liberty Professionals FC and more recently Devrek Belediyespor.

== Football career ==
Arkson began his career by Liberty Prof. U20 and was in January 2015 promoted to the senior squad of Ghana top club Liberty Professionals FC. After four years with Liberty Professionals FC signed on 25 October 2018 with Turkish club Kaynasli Belediyespor.

Early 2019, Arkson completed his half-season move to Turkish lower-tier side Devrek Belediyespor.

== Career statistics ==
=== Club ===
As of 6 July 2019.

| Club | Season | League | | | Cup | | Continental | | Other | | Total | |
| Club | Season | Division | Apps | Goals | Apps | Goals | Apps | Goals | Apps | Goals | Apps | Goals |
|---|---|---|---|---|---|---|---|---|---|---|---|---|
| Liberty Professionals FC | 2016 | Ghanaian Premier League | 21 | 0 | 0 | 0 | 0 | 0 | 0 | 0 | 21 | 0 |
| Career total | | | 21 | 0 | 0 | 0 | 0 | 0 | 0 | 0 | 21 | 0 |
