= Samuel Amofa =

Ghanaian professional footballer

Personal information
- Date of birth: 23 March 1999 (age 27)
- Place of birth: Berekum, Bono, Ghana
- Position: Defender

Team information
- Current team: Thrissur Magic FC
- Number: 2

Senior career*
Years	Team	Apps	(Gls)
2019–2025	Liberty Professionals		
- * Club domestic league appearances and goals

Samuel Amofa (born 23 March 1999) is a Ghanaian professional footballer who plays as defender.

== Career ==
Born in Berekum, Brong-Ahafo, Amofa started his career with Dansoman-based team Liberty Professionals in 2019 and immediately established himself as one of the two centre-back pair. He made his debut on 31 March 2019, playing the full 90 minutes of a 3–1 loss to West African Football Academy in the 2019 GFA Normalization Committee Special Competition. He played 12 out of 14 matches helping the club to a third-place finish in Group B. He continued to play more matches by playing 13 of 15 league matches for 2019–20 season before the league was cancelled due to the COVID-19 pandemic in Ghana. In the 2020–21 season, Amofa played 27 league matches, starting in all of those matches.
