= Razak Issah =

Ghanaian footballer (born 1993)

Personal information
- Date of birth: 23 June 1993 (age 33)
- Place of birth: Ghana
- Position: Goalkeeper

Senior career*
Years	Team	Apps	(Gls)
2010–2013	Liberty Professionals	–	(–)
2013–2014	Aduana Stars	–	(–)
2016–2017	Bechem United	1	(0)
2017–2021	Ebusua Dwarfs	46	(2)
2021–2022	Techiman Eleven Wonders	7	(0)
- * Club domestic league appearances and goals

Razak Issah (born 23 July 1993) is a Ghanaian professional footballer who plays as a goalkeeper for Ghanaian Premier league side Cape Coast Ebusua Dwarfs. He rose to prominence after scoring a direct free-kick during the first match of the 2020–21 season against Ebusua Dwarfs' rivals Elmina Sharks.

== Career ==
Issah started his professional career with Liberty Professionals in 2010. He played for the Dansoman-based club till 2013 when he joined Aduana Stars in July 2013, where he played till December 2014. In January 2016, Issah moved to Bechem United, where played for a season mostly serving as the second choice goalkeeper to Ernest Adu. He played his only match for the club, his debut match on 13 March 2016, after coming on in the 56th minute after Ernest Adu received an injury. He left Bechem in 2017 and joined Ebusua Dwarfs, where he rose to prominence and eventually established himself as the first choice goalkeeper. He made his debut for Ebusua Dwarfs on 9 June 2017, starting in a match against his former club Bechem United. He kept a clean sheet as the match ended in a 1–0 victory to Dwarfs. He played seven league matches that season. On 3 April 2019, during a 2019 GFA Normalization competition match against his former club Liberty Professionals he scored a direct free-kick to bring the match to a 1–1 level, the however lost through a Simon Zibo goal. During the 2019–20 season, he maintained his role as the first choice goalkeeper, keeping 12 out of the 15 matches played before the league was cancelled due to the COVID-19 pandemic in Ghana.

On the opening day of the 2020–21 season, Issah scored a direct free-kick, an 85th-minute equalizer after the club had been trailing since the 53rd minute, to help Dwarfs to a 2–2 draw against rivals Elmina Sharks.

== See also ==
- List of goalscoring goalkeepers
