= Kofi Kordzi =

Ghanaian footballer (born 1995)

Personal information
- Date of birth: 2 January 1995 (age 31)
- Place of birth: Ghana
- Position: Forward

Team information
- Current team: Legon Cities
- Number: 77

Senior career*
Years	Team	Apps	(Gls)
2018–2020	Hearts of Oak	26	(8)
2020–2021	Muaither	22	(8)
2021–2022	Hearts of Oak	23	(7)
2022–2025	Legon Cities	17	(6)
2025-	One Taguig	0	(0)

International career^{‡}
2023–	Ghana A'	2	(0)
- * Club domestic league appearances and goals as of 22 December 2022 ‡ National team caps and goals as of 28 January 2023

Kofi Kordzi (born 2 January 1995) is a Ghanaian professional footballer who plays as forward for Legon Cities. He previously played for Accra Hearts of Oak.

== Career ==
=== Hearts of Oak ===
Kordzi played for Royals FC before joining Ghana Premier League giants Hearts of Oak in January 2019, when he signed a three-year deal with the club after impressing on a two-week trial. He made his debut during the 2019 GFA Normalization Special Competition, on 31 March 2019, he played the full time in a 1–0 victory over Dreams FC. On 28 April 2019, he scored his debut goal in the 78th minute of a 2–0 home victory over International Allies. He also scored on 5 May 2019, after scoring the final goal in a 4–0 victory over West African Football Academy. At the end of the competition he played 11 out of 12 league matches and scored 2 goals. On 17 February 2020, Kordzi was named NASCO man of the match after netting a brace against Bechem United including scoring a 93rd-minute goal to grant Hearts a 3–2 home victory. That season, the 2019–20 season, he played in 14 league matches and scored 6 goals before the league was cancelled due to the outbreak of the COVID-19 pandemic in Ghana, ending his season as the club's top goalscorer.

=== Muaither ===
In October 2020, Kordzi joined Qatari club Muaither SC ahead of the 2020–21 Qatargas League season for a reported transfer fee of $150,000, with a 20% onward transfer fee going for Hearts of Oak. On 29 November 2020 During his debut, he scored a goal in the 90th minute to help them salvage a 2–2 draw against Al Shahania. At the end of his first season with the club, he played 22 matches and scored 8 goals.

== Honours ==
Hearts of Oak

- President's Cup: 2022
- Ghanaian FA Cup: 2022
