= FK Železničar Pančevo =

Serbian football club

Železničar Pančevo
- Full name: Fudbalski Klub Železničar Pančevo
- Nickname: Dizelka (The Diesel Locomotive)
- Founded: 1947; 79 years ago
- Ground: SC Mladost Stadium
- Capacity: 2,967
- President: Zoran Naunković
- Head coach: Radomir Koković
- League: Serbian SuperLiga
- 2025–26: Serbian SuperLiga, 4th of 16
- Website: fkzeleznicar.rs
Home colours	Away colours

FK Železničar Pančevo (Serbian Cyrillic: ФК Железничар Панчево) is a professional football club based in Pančevo, Vojvodina, Serbia. They compete in the Serbian SuperLiga, the top tier of the national league system.

The club rose to prominence in early 2020s winning back-to-back promotions and reaching Serbian SuperLiga in 2022, replacing now defunct FK Dinamo Pančevo as Pančevo's principal football club. The 2025-26 season was the best in club's history as Železničar Pančevo reached 4th place and a qualification spot for the UEFA Conference League.

== History ==
The club won the Banat Zone League in the 2014–15 season and took promotion to the Serbian League Vojvodina, spending the next five years in the third tier. They ended in first place in the COVID-19-interrupted 2019–20 season and were promoted to the Serbian First League. After three seasons in the second tier, the club finished as runners-up in 2022–23 and earned promotion to the Serbian SuperLiga.

== Honours ==
- Serbian League Vojvodina (Tier 3)
  - 2019–20
- Banat Zone League (Tier 4)
  - 2014–15

== Seasons ==
Season	League									Cup	European competitions
Season	Division	Pld	W	D	L	GF	GA	Pts	Pos	Cup	European competitions
2014–15	4 – Banat	30	17	6	7	67	31	57	1st	—	—
2015–16	3 – Vojvodina	30	13	4	13	40	42	43	7th	—	—
2016–17	3 – Vojvodina	28	9	9	10	36	34	36	8th	—	—
2017–18	3 – Vojvodina	30	11	6	13	33	30	39	9th	—	—
2018–19	3 – Vojvodina	32	13	7	12	31	30	46	6th	—	—
2019–20	3 – Vojvodina	17 (Note: The season was cut short due to the COVID-19 pandemic in Serbia.)	15	2	0	37	8	47	1st	—	—
2020–21	2	34	13	5	16	38	43	44	10th	—	—
2021–22	2	37	20	8	9	54	36	68	3rd	Round of 32	—
2022–23	2	37	20	8	9	63	35	68	2nd	Round of 16	—
2023–24	1	37	10	9	8	47	65	39	14th	Round of 32	—
2024–25	1	37	13	8	6	36	47	47	10th	Round of 32	—
2025–26	1	37	16	11	10	50	37	59	4th	Round of 16	—
2026–27	1	37	TBD	TBD	TBD	TBD	TBD	TBD	TBD	TBD	UEFA Conference League (TBD)

== Železničar Pančevo in Europe ==
Železničar Pančevo scores are given first in all scorelines.

Season	Competition	Round	Opponent	Home	Away	Aggregate
2026–27	UEFA Conference League	2Q	(Portugal) Braga	0–1	0–4	0–5

== Players ==
=== First-team squad ===
As of 1 October 2026

Note: Flags indicate national team as defined under FIFA eligibility rules; some limited exceptions apply. Players may hold more than one non-FIFA nationality.

No.	Pos.	Nation	Player
1	GK	SRB	Zoran Popović (captain)
3	DF	CMR	Christian Tchouante (on loan from Mjällby)
4	DF	ENG	Billy Gee
5	DF	SRB	Nemanja Vidojević
6	DF	SRB	Mirko Milikić
7	MF	SRB	Marko Ćurić
9	FW	SRB	Luka Adžić
10	FW	ANG	Simão Pedro
11	MF	SRB	Nikola Jovanović
12	DF	GHA	Abdul Yusif
14	MF	SRB	Davorin Tošić
17	FW	SRB	Aleksa Kuljanin
19	DF	SRB	Uroš Tegeltija
20	MF	SRB	Janko Jevremović
21	FW	NGR	David Ankeye

No.	Pos.	Nation	Player
22	MF	SUI	Nemanja Zarić
26	MF	NIG	Mamane Sabo
27	FW	SRB	Miloš Pantović (on loan from Panathinaikos)
33	DF	SRB	Nikola Đuričić
47	DF	SUI	Yassin Sbai
63	DF	SRB	Stefan Obradović (on loan from Vizela)
66	GK	SRB	Jovan Miladinović
70	FW	BRA	Léo Agostinho
77	MF	SUI	Kristian Šekularac
80	MF	SRB	Stefan Mitrović
88	MF	FRA	Clément Lhernault
90	FW	GHA	Kwaku Karikari
95	FW	SRB	Srđan Plavšić
99	GK	SRB	Mirko Stevanović

=== On dual registration ===
Note: Flags indicate national team as defined under FIFA eligibility rules; some limited exceptions apply. Players may hold more than one non-FIFA nationality.

No.	Pos.	Nation	Player
22	MF	SUI	Nemanja Zarić (with Smederevo 1924 until the end of the 2026–27 season)
66	GK	SRB	Jovan Miladinović (with Bor until the end of the 2026–27 season)

No.	Pos.	Nation	Player
80	MF	SRB	Stefan Mitrović (with Smederevo 1924 until the end of the 2026–27 season)

=== Out on loan ===
Note: Flags indicate national team as defined under FIFA eligibility rules; some limited exceptions apply. Players may hold more than one non-FIFA nationality.

No.	Pos.	Nation	Player
—	DF	CIV	Abdoul Sawadogo (at Smederevo 1924 until the end of the 2026–27 season)
—	DF	SRB	Željko Pavlović (at Brodarac until the end of the 2026–27 season)
—	MF	FRA	Vladimir Karajčić (at Smederevo 1924 until the end of the 2026–27 season)

No.	Pos.	Nation	Player
—	MF	NGR	Timileyin Joseph (at Smederevo 1924 until the end of the 2026–27 season)
—	FW	SRB	Jovan Bradić (at Brodarac until the end of the 2026–27 season)
—	FW	GHA	Sumaila Wasiu (at OFK Vršac until the end of the 2026–27 season)

=== Coaching staff ===
Position	Name
Head coach	(Serbia) Radomir Koković
Assistant coach	(Serbia) Đorđe Čotra (Serbia) Dragan Žarković (Serbia) Marko Jović
Trainer analyst	(Serbia) Mihailo Đokić
Fitness trainer	(Serbia) Filip Stojanović (Serbia) Boško Rašković
Goalkeeper coach	(Serbia) Slobodan Šaranov
Team manager	(Serbia) Ratko Obradović
Head of the medical team	(Serbia) Miloš Cvetanović
Team doctor	(Serbia) Dr. Nenad Zdujić (Serbia) Dr. Morariju Euđen
Physiotherapist	(Serbia) Marko Petrović (Serbia) Aleksandar Tasković
Medical technician	(Serbia) Miodrag Ciculj
Economist	(Serbia) Damir Stanimirović

=== Club management ===
Position	Name
President	(Serbia) Zoran Naunković
Sports director	(Serbia) Bojan Šaranov

=== Notable players ===
This is a list of players who have played at full international level.

- (The Gambia) Sulayman Marreh
- (Comoros) El Fardou Ben
- (Ivory Coast) Sékou Sanogo
- (Montenegro) Milan Mijatović
- (Niger) Mamane Sabo
- (Serbia) Marko Gajić
- (Serbia) Brana Ilić
- (Serbia) Miloš Kosanović
- (Serbia) Nemanja Milunović
- (Serbia) Petar Stanić
- (Serbia) Vojislav Stanković
- (Slovakia) Boris Sekulić

For a list of all FK Železničar Pančevo players with a Wikipedia article, see Category:FK Železničar Pančevo players.

== Managerial history ==
Period	Name
2015–2016	(Serbia) Aleksandar Stevanović
2017	(Serbia) Nenad Stojičić
2018–2019	(Serbia) Goran Mrđa
2019	(Serbia) Nebojša Petrović
2019–2020	(Serbia) Dušan Jevrić
2020	(Serbia) Marko Perović
2020	(Serbia) Marko Andrejić
2020	(Serbia) Goran Mrđa
2021–2022	(Serbia) Dragan Aničić
2022	(Serbia) Dragan Perišić
2022	(Serbia) Igor Savić
2022–2023	(Serbia) Tomislav Sivić
2023	(Bosnia and Herzegovina) Vladimir Gaćinović
2023	(Serbia) Predrag Rogan
2023	(Serbia) Aleksandar Linta
2023–2024	(Serbia) Nenad Mijailović
2024	(Cyprus) Siniša Dobrašinović
2024	(Serbia) Tomislav Sivić
2024	(Serbia) Marko Savić
2024–2025	(Serbia) Branko Mirjačić
2025–	(Serbia) Radomir Koković

== Gallery ==
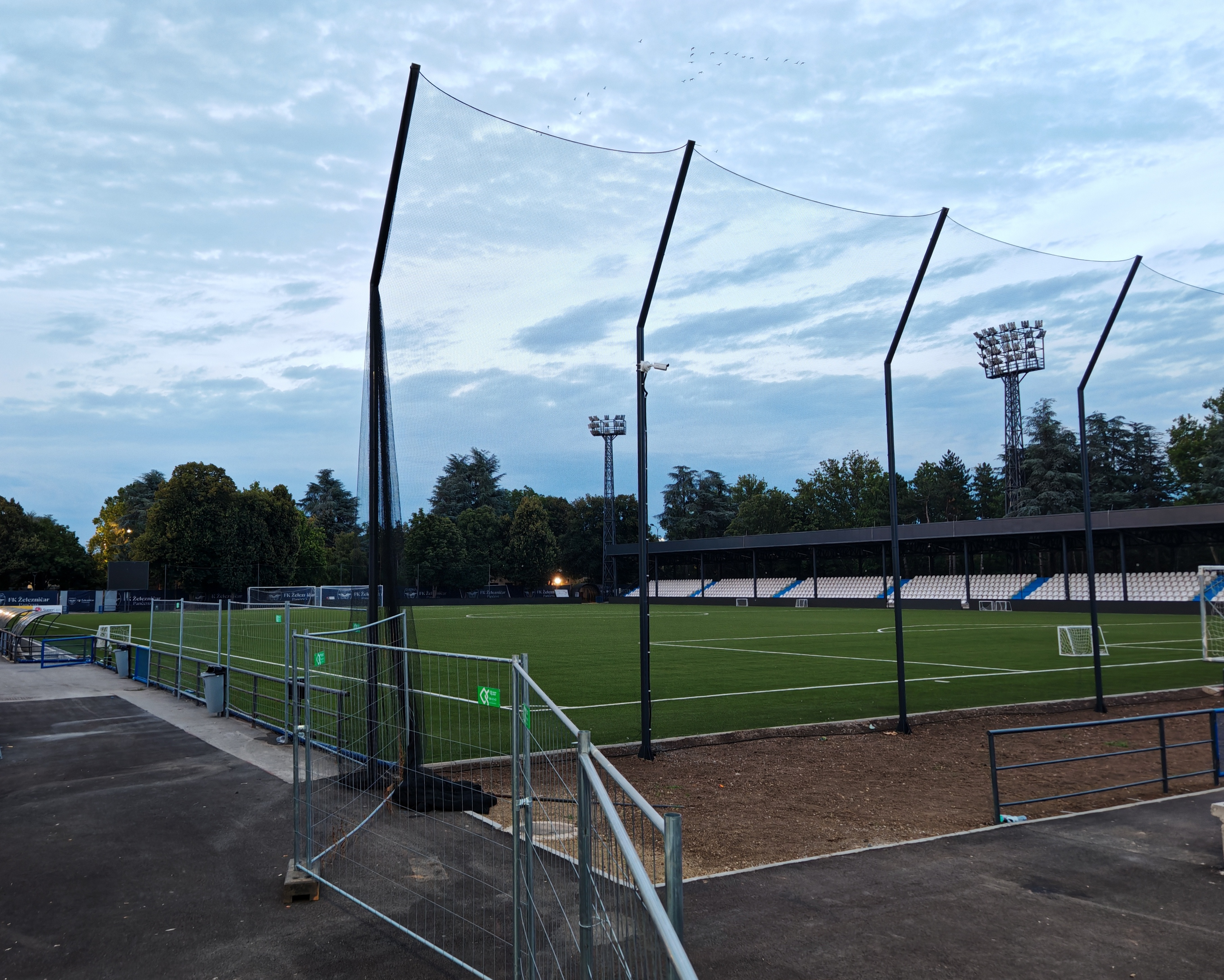
East stand of SRC Mladost Pančevo Stadium, July 2026

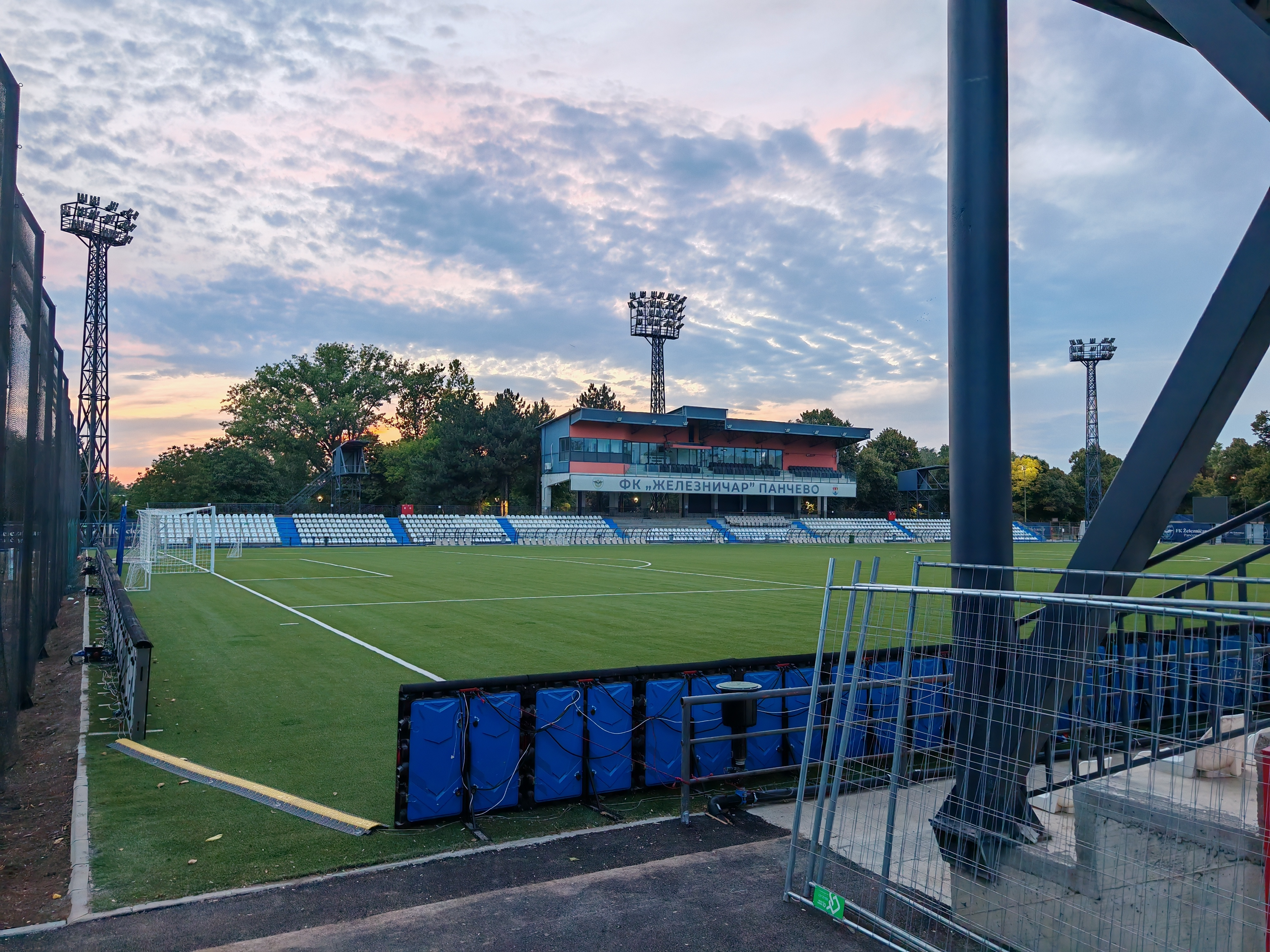
West stand of SRC Mladost Pančevo Stadium, July 2026

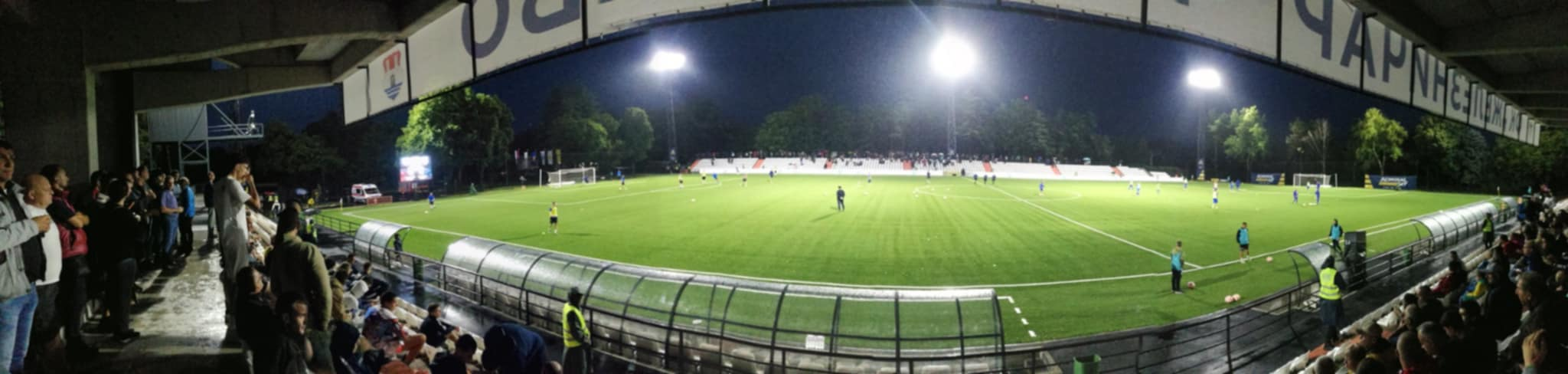
SRC Mladost Pančevo Stadium during the game, June 2025

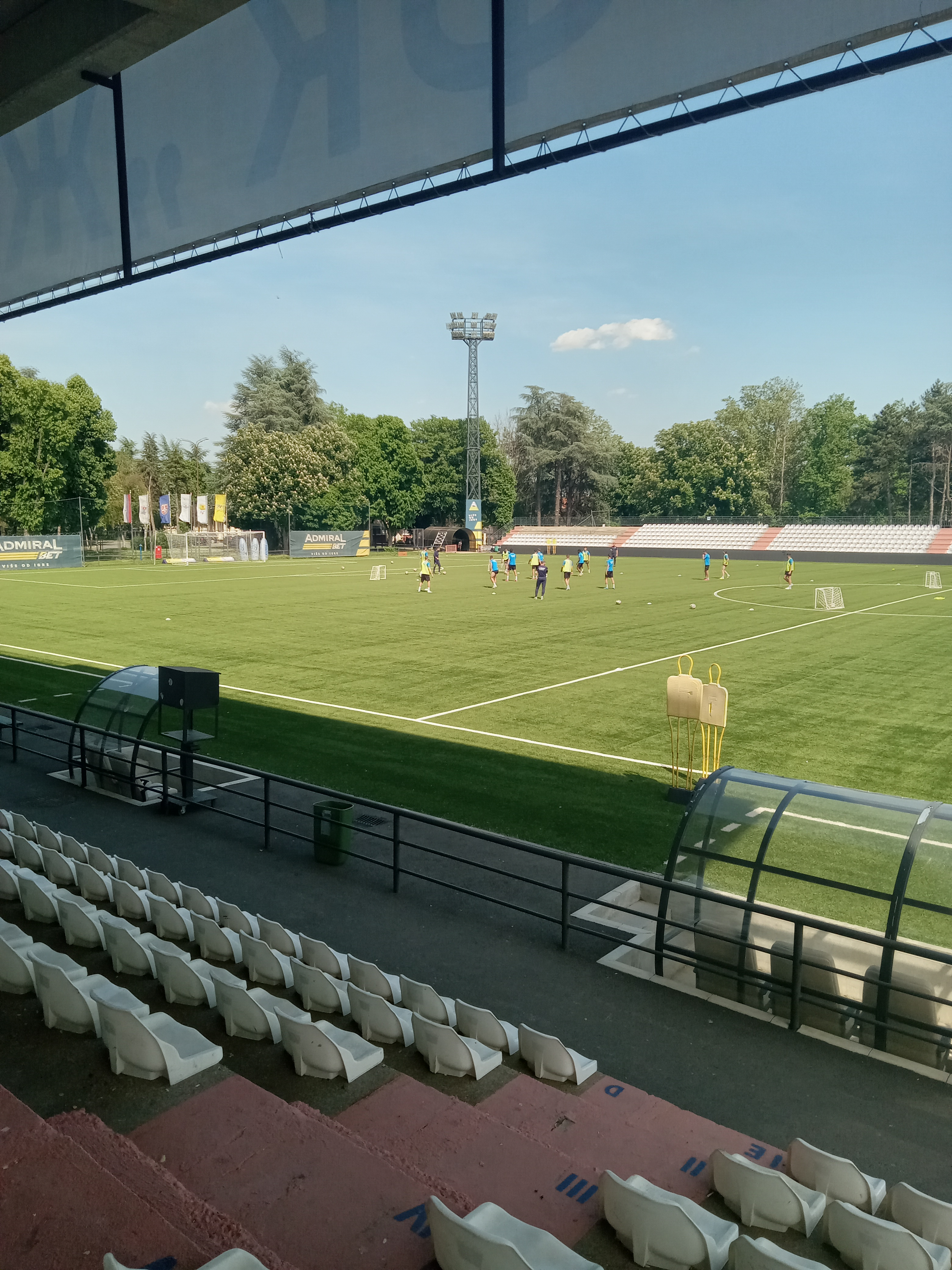
View on football pitch of SRC Mladost Pančevo Stadium during the practice, May 2025

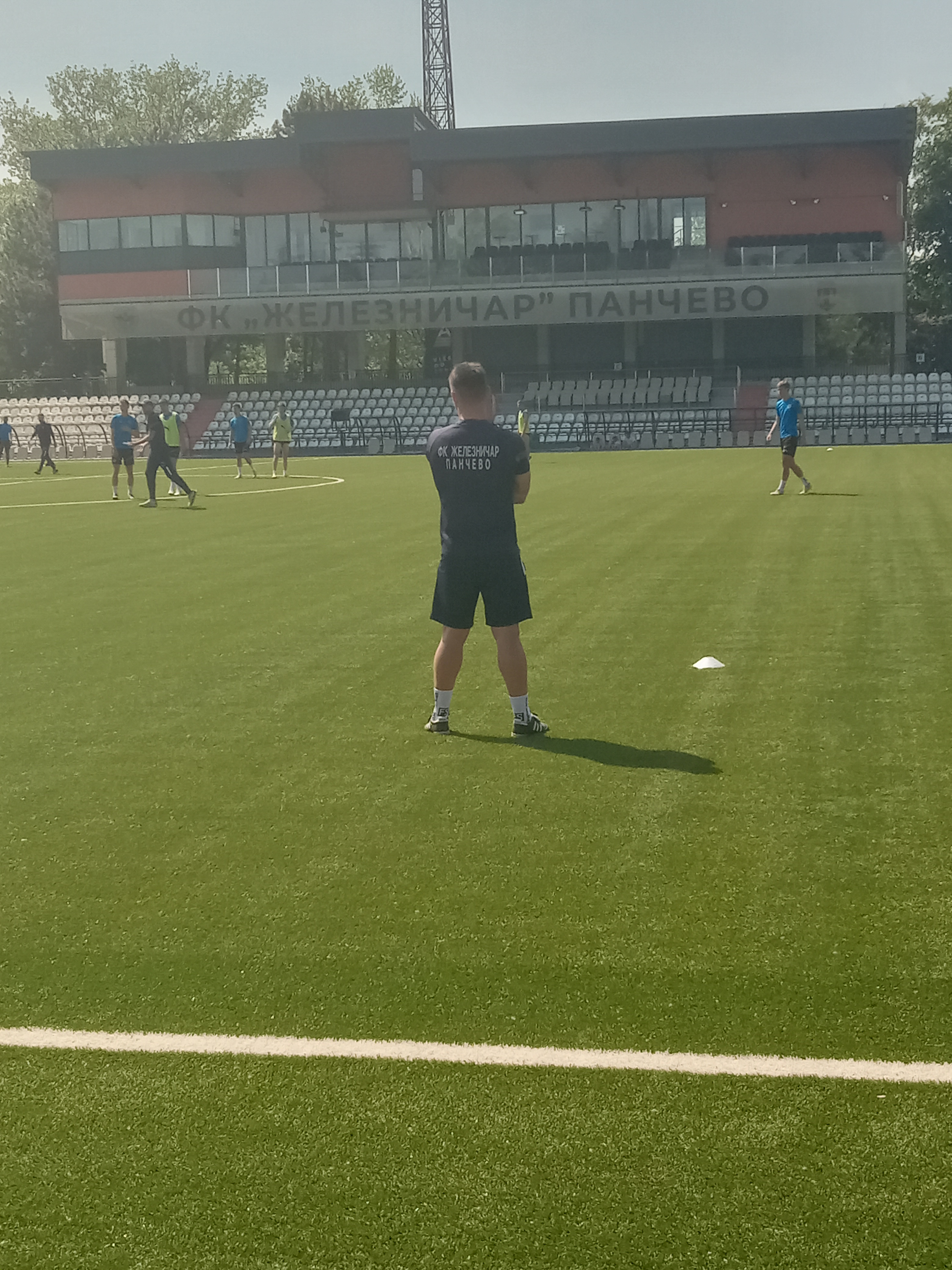
On field view of the SRC Mladost Pančevo Stadium during the practice, May 2025

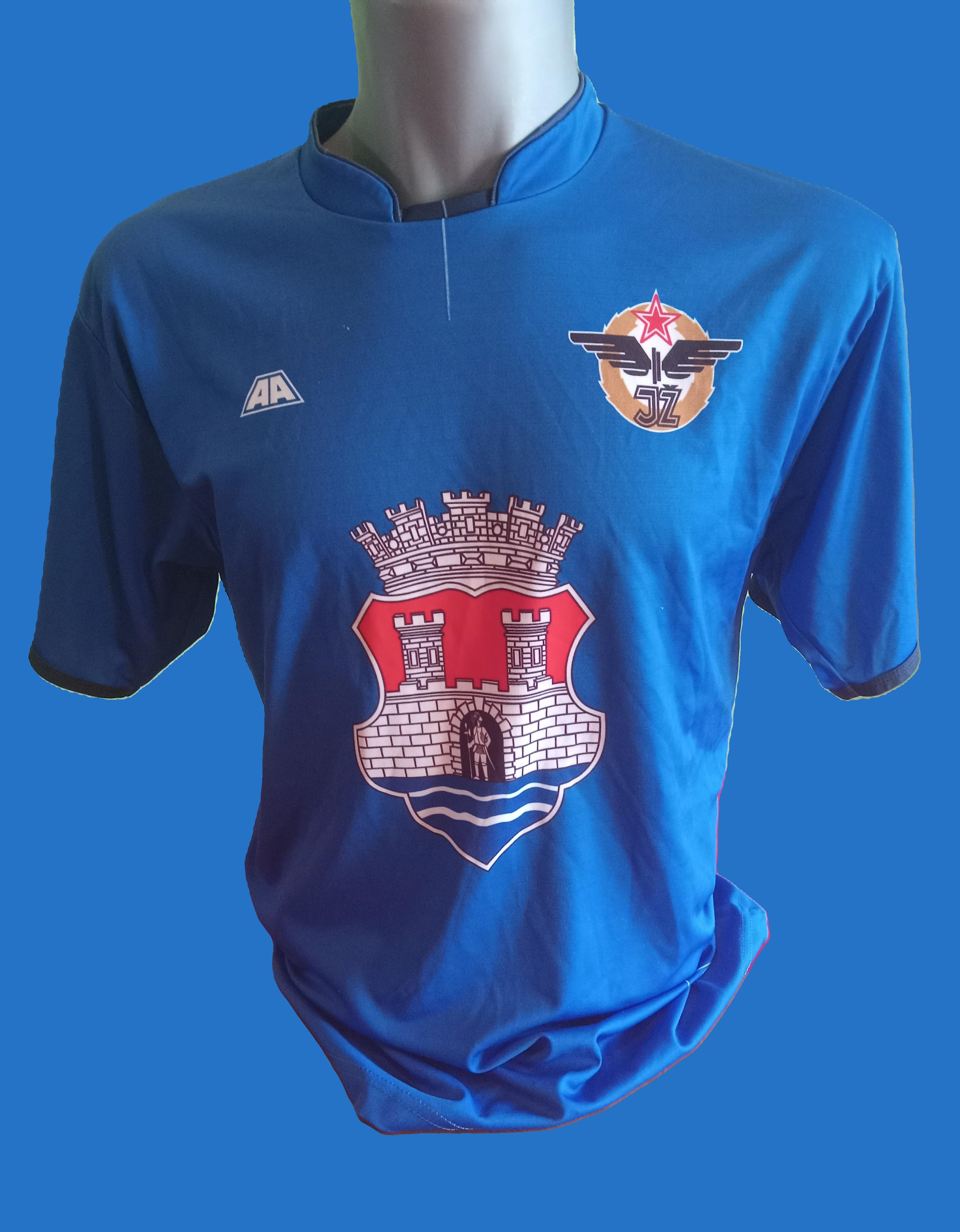
Old style jersey

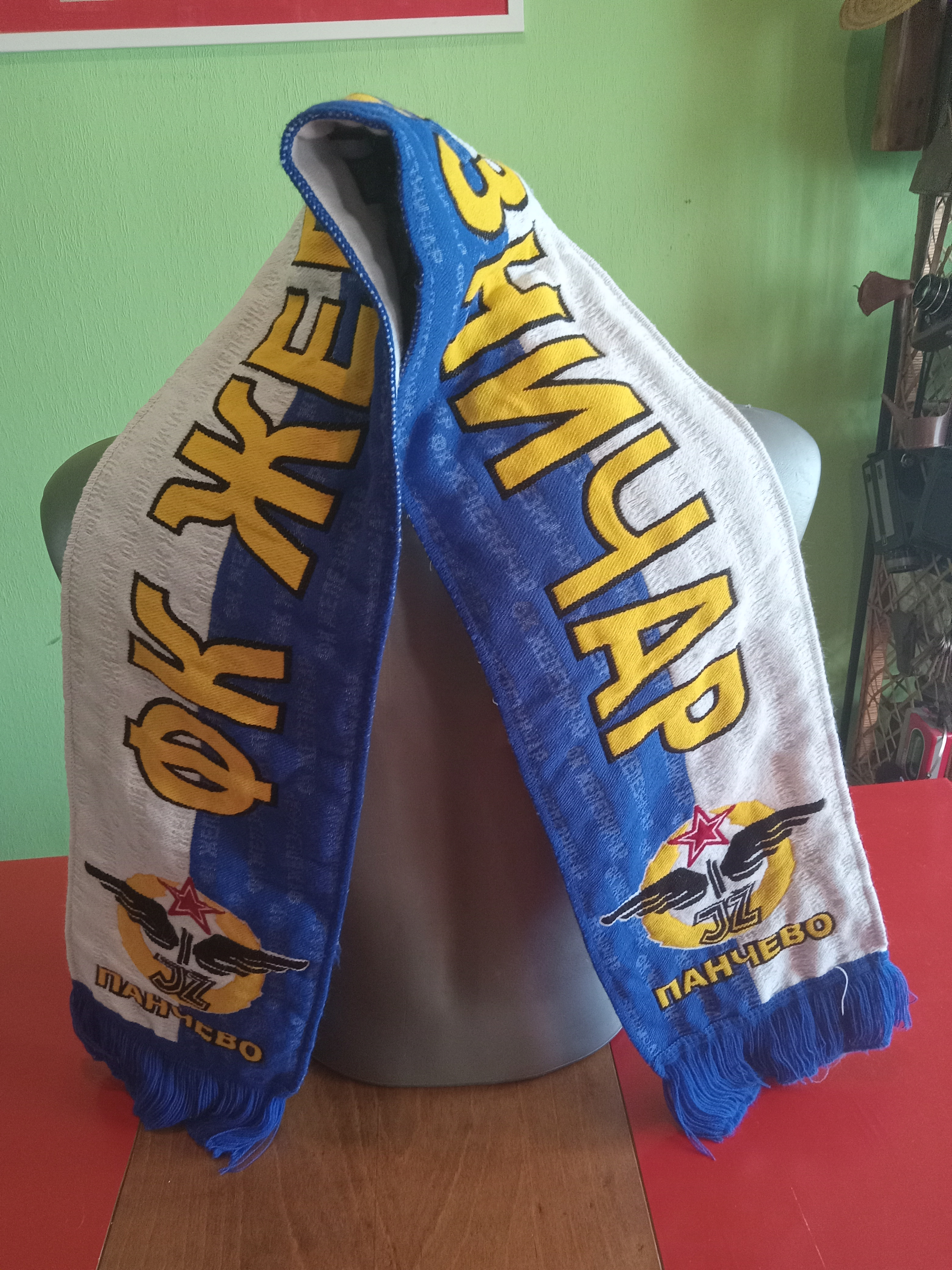
Cheerleaders scarf
