= Benjamin Acquah =

Ghanaian footballer (born 2000)

Personal information
- Date of birth: 29 December 2000 (age 25)
- Place of birth: Amasaman, Ghana
- Height: 1.80 m (5 ft 11 in)
- Position: Midfielder

Team information
- Current team: Javor-Matis
- Number: 17

Youth career
- Red Bull Ghana

Senior career*
Years	Team	Apps	(Gls)
2020–2021	Ebusua Dwarfs	17	(5)
2021	→ Helsingborgs IF (loan)	19	(1)
2022–2024	Helsingborgs IF	67	(8)
2025	Portimonense	3	(1)
2025–	Javor-Matis	13	(2)
- * Club domestic league appearances and goals as of 13 June 2026

Benjamin Acquah (born 29 December 2000) is a Ghanaian footballer who plays as a midfielder for Serbian SuperLiga club Javor-Matis. He previously played for Ghana Premier League side Cape Coast Ebusua Dwarfs.

== Career ==
Acquah started his career with Cape Coast Ebusua Dwarfs. In March 2021, he joined Helsingborgs IF on a one-year initial one-year loan deal with an option to make it permanent on a three-year contract.

On January 16, 2025, Acquah joined Portuguese Liga Portugal 2 club Portimonense on a deal until June 2027.
