= Mirko Milikić =

Serbian footballer (born 2001)

Personal information
- Date of birth: 24 December 2001 (age 24)
- Place of birth: Belgrade, FR Yugoslavia
- Position: Defender

Team information
- Current team: Železničar Pančevo
- Number: 6

Youth career
- OFK Beograd
- Red Star Belgrade

Senior career*
Years	Team	Apps	(Gls)
2020	Inđija	0	(0)
2020–2022	Celje	0	(0)
2021	→ Radnički Pirot (loan)	10	(0)
2021–2022	→ Žarkovo (loan)	22	(3)
2022–	Železničar Pančevo	79	(2)

International career
2017	Montenegro U16	9	(0)
2018	Montenegro U18	4	(1)
2018–2019	Montenegro U19	10	(0)
2026–	Serbia	1	(0)
- * Club domestic league appearances and goals as of 9 July 2026

Mirko Milikić (born 24 December 2001) is a Serbian professional footballer who plays as a midfielder for Serbian SuperLiga club Železničar Pančevo and the Serbia national team.

== Club career ==
Milikić started his professional career in Serbia, before joining Celje in Slovenia in February 2020. He currently plays for Serbian SuperLiga club Železničar Pančevo.

== International career ==
Milikić played for the Montenegro U16, U18, U19 international team. However, he decided in 2026 to play for Serbia. He played first match in June 2026 against Mexico.
