= Sellas Tetteh =

Ghanaian football player and coach

Personal information
- Full name: Sellas Tetteh Teivi
- Date of birth: 12 December 1956 (age 69)
- Place of birth: Adabraka, Ghana

Youth career
- Great Mao Mao

Senior career*
Years	Team	Apps	(Gls)
- Golden Pods
- Hearts of Oak
- Zebi
- ACB
- Julius Berger
- Bendel United
1994–1995	Iwuanyanwu		

Managerial career
- 1995–1996: Kotobabi Powerlines
- 1996–2001: Liberty Professionals
- 2001–2002: Ghana U17 (Assistant)
- 2002–2003: Ghana U17
- 2003–2004: Ghana U23
- 2004–2008: Ghana (Assistant)
- 2008: Ghana
- 2008–2010: Ghana U20
- 2009–2010: Liberty Professionals
- 2010–2011: Rwanda
- 2013–2016: Ghana U20
- 2015–2017: Sierra Leone
- 2019–2020: Sierra Leone
- 2021: Liberty Professionals (interim)
Medal record
Men's football
Representing Ghana (as manager)
FIFA U-20 World Cup
Winner	2009
Bronze medal – third place	2013
Africa U-20 Cup of Nations
Runner-up	2013
Bronze medal – third place	2015
- * Club domestic league appearances and goals

Sellas Tetteh Teivi (born 12 December 1956) is a Ghanaian professional football coach and former player.

== Early and personal life ==
Sellas Tetteh Teivi was born on 12 December 1956 in Adabraka. His father was Mensah Teivi, a mechanic, and his mother was Elizabeth Dablah; he was the eldest of eight children.

He was married to Evelyn Idun Teivi until her death on 26 January 2017, with whom he has two children – a daughter called Precious Awefa Teivi and a son called Prince Kelvin Sowah Teivi.

Tetteh is a practising Christian. He acknowledged God's role in Ghana's historic victory at the FIFA U-20 World Cup, saying prophetic insights from Nigerian Prophet T.B. Joshua helped him guide the team to success.

== Playing career ==
Tetteh played professional club football in Ghana for Great Mao Mao, Golden Pods, Hearts of Oak, Zebi; in Nigeria for ACB, Julius Berger, Bendel United and Iwuanyanwu; and in Bangladesh.

== Coaching career ==
Tetteh began his coaching career in 1995 with Kotobabi Powerlines, before joining Liberty Professionals a year later. Tetteh became Assistant Manager of the Ghana under-17 team in 2001 – taking full control a year later – before moving to the Ghana under-23 team in 2003. He later became an Assistant to the full national team. He was appointed caretaker manager of the Ghana national team in June 2008, a position he held until August 2008.

Tetteh was the head coach for the Ghana under-20 team at the 2009 African Youth Championship, leading them to win the championship, the first time since 1999 when they won, with that qualifying them to the World Cup. Tetteh guided the Ghana under-20 team to the 2009 FIFA U-20 World Cup, becoming the first African team to win the competition. As a consequence, Tetteh won the CAF Coach of the Year Award and the Sports Writers Association of Ghana Coach of the Year Award. He was also honoured by veteran coach Cecil Jones Attuquayefio, who 'knighted' Tetteh.

Tetteh was appointed manager of the Rwandan national side in February 2010, leaving his dual position as manager of the Ghana under-20 national team and Ghanaian club side Liberty Professionals. On 6 September 2011, Tetteh resigned as Rwanda's manager.

Tetteh was put in charge of the Ghana U20 team again in December 2012 ahead of the 2013 African Youth Championship in Algeria. He led the team to a 2nd place losing to Egypt in the finals after a penalty shootout. Tetteh was again in charge of Ghana U20 at the 2013 FIFA U-20 World Cup. He led the team to a third-place finish at the end of the competition.

On 14 August 2015, Tetteh was given a temporary contract for three months, to become caretaker of the Sierra Leone national team. In March 2016 he left his position as Ghana under-20 manager in order to continue as Sierra Leone caretaker manager. He was replaced as Sierra Leone manager by John Keister in May 2017. In August 2019, Tetteh took the Sierra Leone head coach position. In November 2019, national team captain Kei Kamara retired from international duty, blaming Tetteh in part. Tetteh defended himself. He quit as Sierra Leone manager in March 2020.

In April 2021, Tetteh returned to Liberty Professionals along with Andy Sinason as co-interim coaches during the second round of the 2020–21 season. His appointment came after the club sacked their head coach David Ocloo due the club's poor performance in the first round which had caused them lavishing at the bottom of the league and in the relegation zone.

== Honours ==
=== Manager ===
Ghana U20

- FIFA U-20 World Cup: 2009
- African Youth Championship: 2009
- WAFU U-20 Championship: 2008

Individual

- CAF Coach of the Year: 2009
- Sports Writers Association of Ghana Coach of the Year: 2009
