= Melcom =

Supermarket chain in Ghana

Melcom Group of Companies
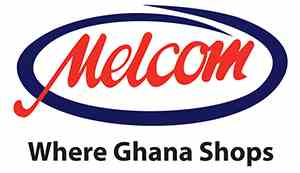
- Company type: Private ownership
- Traded as: Melcom Group
- Industry: Retailing
- Founded: 1989; 37 years ago
- Founder: Bhagwan Khubchandani
- Headquarters: 2nd Palace Link Road, Off Dadeban Road, North Industrial Area P.O. Box 3920, Accra, Ghana
- Number of locations: 42+ stores (as of June 2019)
- Area served: Ghana
- Key people: Bhagwan Khubchandani (Group Chairman); Mahesh Melwani (Joint-Group Managing Director); Ramesh Sadhwani (Joint-Group Managing Director); Sonya Sadhwani (Director of Brand Management)
- Products: Supermarket; Hypermarket; Superstore
- Subsidiaries: Melcom Stores Ltd. Century Industries Ltd. Crown Star Electronics Industry Ltd. Melcom Hospitality; Melcom Travels; Melcom Care
- Website: www.melcomgroup.com

Melcom is a supermarket chain consisting of 65 shops spread all over Ghana. It was started in 1989 by Indian magnate Bhagwan Khubchandani. His late father, Ramchand Khubchandani, had arrived in the then Gold Coast in 1929 as a 14-year-old to work as a store boy. Melcom Group of Companies is a family business.

The Melcom Group of Companies consists of six separate entities: Melcom Limited, Century Industries Limited, Crownstar Electronic Industries Limited, Melcom Hospitality, Melcom Travels, and Melcom Care. Aside from conquering an extensive retail market share with a network of more than 60 retail outlets spread all over Ghana (Melcom Limited), the Group is well-diversified into other businesses.

Melcom Group is best known for its shopping mall, Melcom Limited. As Ghana’s largest chain of retail department stores, Melcom offers thousands of products and hundreds of well known brands.

== History ==
=== Disasters in 2012 ===
In 2012 Melcom suffered two major accidents. On 7 November 2012, Ghana suffered a major accident when Melcom's five story shopping mall at Achimota near Accra, Ghana collapsed, trapping many people inside. The NADMO organized a rescue mission. 82 people in all, including 14 dead, were pulled out of the rubble.

Melcom had been operating in the building, which it said it had rented, only since January 2012. The NADMO promised an investigation to find out the cause of the collapse. Reports suggested that the building had structural defects owing to lack of adherence to building codes and use of improper materials.

On December 22, 2012, Melcom suffered another major accident when its mall in Agona Swedru in the Central Region of Ghana was totally burnt down by fire and attended to by the GNFRS. Because the fire occurred after close of work, there were no casualties. However, adjoining warehouses stocked with items for Christmas were also burnt down.
