= Mamane Sabo =

Nigerien footballer (born 2004)

Mamane Amadou Sabo
Personal information
- Full name: Mamane Moustapha Amadou Sabo
- Date of birth: 14 September 2004 (age 22)
- Place of birth: Niger
- Height: 1.81 m (5 ft 11 in)
- Position: Midfielder

Team information
- Current team: Železničar Pančevo
- Number: 26

Youth career
- Sahel

Senior career*
Years	Team	Apps	(Gls)
2020–2023	AS SONIDEP		
2023–2024	Hammarby TFF	13	(1)
2023–2024	→ Young Reds (loan)	21	(1)
2024	→ IFK Mariehamn (loan)	10	(0)
2025	→ Skënderbeu (loan)	13	(0)
2025–2026	Javor Ivanjica	33	(1)
2026–	Železničar Pančevo	0	(0)

International career^{‡}
2023–	Niger U23	3	(0)
2023–	Niger	2	(0)
- * Club domestic league appearances and goals as of 13 June 2026 ‡ National team caps and goals as of 8 October 2025

Mamane Moustapha Amadou Sabo (born 14 September 2004) is a Nigerien professional footballer who plays as a midfielder for Serbian SuperLiga club Železničar Pančevo, and the Niger national team.

== Club career ==
Sabo joined Hammarby TFF on 16 September 2022.

Sabo joined Young Reds on loan on 24 July 2023.

On 31 July 2024, Sabo signed with Veikkausliiga club IFK Mariehamn on a loan deal until the end of the season. After the season he returned to Hammarby.

In February 2025, he was loaned out to Skënderbeu in Albania.

On 14 July 2025, Sabo joined Javor Ivanjica.

== Career statistics ==
=== Club ===
As of 29 November 2025

Appearances and goals by club, season and competition
Club	Season	League			Cup		Continental		Total	
Club	Season	Division	Apps	Goals	Apps	Goals	Apps	Goals	Apps	Goals
Hammarby TFF	2023	Ettan	13	1	–		–		13	1
Young Reds Antwerp (loan)	2023–24	Belgian Division 1	21	1	–		–		21	1
IFK Mariehamn (loan)	2024	Veikkausliiga	10	0	0	0	–		10	0
Skënderbeu (loan)	2024–25	Kategoria Superiore	13	0	1	0	–		14	0
Javor Ivanjica	2025–26	Serbian SuperLiga	16	0	1	0	–		17	0
Career total			83	2	2	0	0	0	85	2

=== International ===
As of match played 8 October 2025

Niger
Year	Apps	Goals
2023	1 (Note: Appearance(s) in 2026 FIFA World Cup qualification)	0
2025	1 (Note: Appearance(s) in 2026 FIFA World Cup qualification)	0
Total	2	0
