= Elvis Baffour =

Ghanaian professional footballer

Personal information
- Full name: Elvis Kyei Baffour
- Date of birth: 7 February 1999 (age 27)
- Place of birth: Kumasi, Ghana
- Height: 1.76 m (5 ft 9 in)
- Position: Winger

Youth career
- Rainbow FC
- Liberty Professionals

Senior career*
| Years | Team | Apps | (Gls) |
| 2018–2020 | Liberty Professionals | 34 | (13) |
| 2020–2023 | AS Soliman | 62 | (8) |
| 2023–2024 | Rogaška | 0 | (0) |
- * Club domestic league appearances and goals as of 20 February 2024

Elvis Kyei Baffour (born 7 February 1999) is a Ghanaian professional footballer who plays as a winger.

== Club career ==
=== Rainbow FC ===
Baffour was born in Kumasi and played for Kumasi-based lower-tier side Rainbow FC before joining Liberty Professionals in 2017.

=== Liberty Professionals ===
Baffour started his professional career with Dansoman-based club Liberty Professionals. He made his Ghana Premier League debut during the 2018 season, on 25 March 2018 in a 3–1 loss to West African Football Academy (WAFA), playing the full 90 minutes. On 11 April 2018, he scored his debut goal by scoring the only goal in a match against Ashanti Gold to grant Liberty their second victory in four days after going on a losing streak in three matches. The season was cut short due the Anas Number 12 Expose which caused the dissolution of the Ghana Football Association. Baffour finished the season with eight appearances and a goal.

During the 2019 GFA Normalization Competition, Baffour played 11 matches and scored 4 goals for the Scientific Soccer Boys. He established himself as a fan favourite within this period. He scored 8 goals and provided 4 assists in his 15 league appearances for the Dansoman-based club during the 2019–20 season before the league was cancelled due to the COVID-19 pandemic, ending the season as the club's top goalscorer and the fourth joint league top scorer. At the end of these truncated season, he was linked with a move to the United Arab Emirates giants Al Ain, however he joined Tunisian side AS Soliman instead. In his three-year stay with the club, he played 34 league matches, scored 13 goals and provided 4 assists.

=== AS Soliman ===
On 12 October 2020, Baffour joined Tunisian side AS Soliman. He signed a three-year contract with the club after passing his medicals. On 18 December 2020, he made his debut by playing the full 90 minutes in a 2–1 victory over Etoile du Sahel. He scored his first goal for the club on 31 January 2021 by opening the scoreline in the 37th minute in an eventual 1–1 draw against CS Sfaxien.

== International career ==
Baffour has earned call-ups to the Ghana under-20 and under-23 teams.
