= Jindo Gim clan =

Korean clan from South Jeolla Province

- Country: Korea
- Current region: Jindo County
- Founder: Kim Guk bin

The Jindo Gim clan (Korean: 진도 김씨; Hanja: 珍島 金氏) is one of the Korean clans. Their Bon-gwan is in Jindo County, South Jeolla Province. According to the South Korean census held in 2000, the population of Jindo Gim clan was 1464. Their founder was Kim Guk bin who was from Han dynasty but exiled himself to Jindo County, South Jeolla Province by ship to avoid Battle of Guandu in Three Kingdoms.

== See also ==
- Korean clan names of foreign origin
