= Venomous Vipers =

- Full name: Venomous Vipers
- Ground: Robert Mensah Stadium, Cape Coast, Ghana
- League: Division One League Zone 2B
Home colours

Venomous Vipers is a Ghanaian professional football team from Cape Coast, founded in 1936. They have a local rivalry with Ebusua Dwarfs.

The Venomous Vipers are one of the oldest clubs in Ghana and were invited to participate in the inaugural national league in 1956. They participated at the national level on and off during the 1960s and were led by players such as Robert Takyi.

The Venomous Vipers were relegated from the top flight in 1990.

The club's management board was restructured in 2014.

The club was promoted to Ghana's Division One in 2017.
