= Mai Jindo =

Pakistani labourer woman known for court marshal of army officer

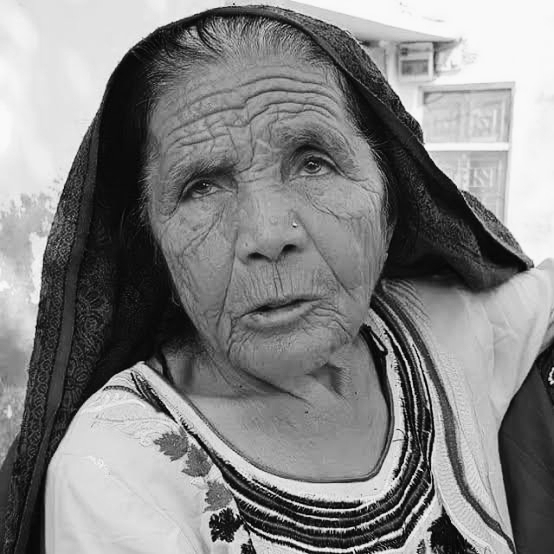
- Born: 1942 (age 83–84); Tando Bahawal, Sindh
- Years active: 1992 — 2000
- Known for: Execution of Major Arshad Jamil

Mai Jindo (Sindhi: مائي جندو) (born 1942) is a laborer woman from Tando Bahawal whose two sons and son-in-law were killed by Pakistani Security Forces along with seven other villagers in 1992 of farmers involved in a land dispute,. This incident also known as Tando Bahawal incident. Mai Jindo fought hard for justice. Two of her daughters, Hakimzadi and Zaibunissa, self-immolatedin order to get the authorities to take up their brothers' cases.

== Tando Bahawal incident ==
On 5 June 1992, a contingent of Pakistani Security Forces, led by Major Arshad Jameel, raided the village of Tando Bahawal, on the outskirts of Hyderabad, Sindh, kidnapped nine villagers and later shot them dead on the bank of the Indus River near Jamshoro. The dead included Mai Jindo's two sons, Bahadur and Manthar, and a son-in-law, Haji Akram. Later, the Security Forces alleged that the villagers were terrorists and agents of India's intelligence agency Research and Analysis Wing. The media, however, exposed the claims as phony and produced evidence that the victims were farmers involved in a land dispute.

== Hakimzadi and Zaibunissa ==
On 11 September 1996, two daughters of Mai Jindo, Hakimzadi, and Zaibunissa set themselves afire to protest delays in the execution of Major Arshad Jamil, convicted of murdering their brothers and seven other villagers. They were hospitalized in critical condition and both later died.

== Court-martial ==
After a long and painful struggle by Mai Jindo and her two self-immolated daughters, the Army dismissed Major Arshad Jamil and tried him by court-martial. He was sentenced to death in October 1996. The 15 soldiers who were under his command at the time of the incident were also permanently expelled from the Army. The Chief of Army Staff Jehangir Karamat confirmed the conviction and sentence and the President of Pakistan Farooq Ahmad Khan Leghari rejected a mercy petition. Previously in October 1995, Arshad Jameel filled an appeal petition with the Supreme Court of Pakistan, but his petition was dismissed. Major Arshad Jamil was hanged in Hyderabad Central Jail on 28 October 1996.

== Compensation for families of victims ==
In 2004, 12 years after the Tando Bahawal incident and 8 years after Major Arshad Jamil's execution, the Government of Sindh allotted 24 acres of land to each bereaved family in Thatta district. Later Mai Jindo stated that the land was barren. In 2006, District Nazim Kunwar Naveed Jamil distributed compensation cheques for Rs4.55 million among relatives of the victims of the Tando Bahawal carnage.

== See also ==
- Murder of Nazim Jokhio
