= Ganiwu Shaibu =

Ghanaian professional footballer

Personal information
- Date of birth: 25 May 1997 (age 29)
- Place of birth: Ghana
- Position: Goalkeeper

Team information
- Current team: Liberty Professionals
- Number: 16

Senior career*
Years	Team	Apps	(Gls)
2018–	Liberty Professionals	24	(0)
- * Club domestic league appearances and goals as of 3 March 2021

Ganiwu Shaibu (born 25 May 1997) is a Ghanaian professional footballer who plays as a goalkeeper for Ghanaian Premier league side Liberty Professionals F.C.

== Career ==
Shaibu joined Dansoman-based club Liberty Professionals in January 2018. He made his debut on 25 March 2021 in a 3–1 loss to West African Football Academy. During the 2019 GFA Normalization Competition, he played seven games and kept four clean sheets. In the 2019–20 season, he became the main goalkeeper ahead of Kofi Baah and played all the ten league matches before cancelled due to the COVID-19 pandemic in Ghana. His standout performance came on 6 January 2020, when he put on an outstanding performance to be named man of the match in their away goalless draw against Berekum Chelsea. In the 73rd minute, he denied Kofi Owusu from the spot ensuring the match stayed goalless to deny the Blues from victory at the Golden City Park.

The following season, he lost his starting role to Baah who became the main goalkeeper and indirectly relegated him to serve as the second choice goalkeeper. He played his first match of that season on 29 November 2020 in a 1–1 draw against Techiman Eleven Wonders. During the match, he made saves to deny Salifu Ibrahim and Samuel Boakye from scoring.
