= Theo Martey =

Emperor T-Jiga
- Also known as: Emperor T-Jiga
- Born: Theophilus Nii Martei Martey; December 11, 1980 (age 44); Jamestown Accra, Ghana, West Africa
- Genres: Afrobeat, Afropop, Reggae, Highlife, Hiplife, Hip Hop, World music
- Occupation(s): Singer, songwriter, drummer, dancer, music teacher, music producer
- Instrument(s): Xylophone/Balafon; Aslatua/Kashak] Gome; Kpanlogo Drum; Djembe; Talking Drum
- Years active: 1986–present
- Labels: Bam Connect Entertainment; Martey Records; Martey Music Production (MMP)
- Website: akwaabaensemble.com

Theophilus Nii Martei "Theo" Martey (born December 11, 1980), also known professionally as Emperor T-Jiga, is a Ghanaian-American singer-songwriter, drummer, dancer, music teacher, and music producer. Martey has led over 5000 music workshops throughout New England and Beyond. As Emperor T-Jiga, he has released singles such as "Saka Saka," "Pretty Jeniki," "Kilode," "Yeloi," You're My Baby,""Sugar and "Super Star." He has received one Ghana Music Award USA for Best International Collaboration and three additional Ghana Music Award USA nominations.

Martey is also the founder and band leader of the world music ensemble Akwaaba Ensemble, which has released two albums, Akwaaba Welcome Home and Jei Elaaje Wo.

He served as New Hampshire Artist Laureate from 2022 to 2024.

== Early life ==
Martey was born in Jamestown Accra, Ghana, into a family of 16 children with a father who served in the military in Ghana. Martey began performing at the age of 6. He initially performed with the African Personality Youth Ensemble before joining the Shidaa Cultural Troupe in 1989. At the age of 17, he began performing with the Dance Factory Company at the National Theater of Ghana. He moved to the United States when he was 18 years old.

== Career ==
Martey founded the Akwaaba Traditional African Drum and Dance Ensemble in 2002. He formed the group while he was touring with the Brekete Ensemble in London. He named the ensemble after the Twi word for "welcome."

Martey became an American citizen in 2005. In the same year, he was appointed to the New Hampshire Art Council's Arts Education Roster. In addition to his work as a performer, Martey began teaching West African drumming and dance at schools. He received grants from the National Endowment for the Arts, the New England Foundation for the Arts, and the New Hampshire State Council on the Arts to teach at schools throughout New England.

Martey and the Akwaaba Ensemble performed at the American Folk Festival in Maine in 2012.

In 2015, Martey and the Akwaaba Ensemble performed as part of WHS's Culture Matters program. For his work as a music teacher, Martey received the Governor's Arts Award for Arts Education from the New Hampshire government in 2019. Martey and The Akwaaba Ensemble received The New Hampshire Magazine Best of NH 2010 and 2022 Edited Pick for African Beat Akwaaba Ensemble.

Theo Martey (Emperor T Jiga)

Martey released the single "Kilode," which featured Young Freezy/Cabrinny, under the name Emperor T-Jiga in 2021. He went on to win the award for Best International Collaboration at the 2022 Ghana Music Awards USA for this song. The song was also nominated for the US-Based Afropop Song of the Year award at the same event.

Martey was named New Hampshire Artist Laureate in 2022. As Emperor T-Jiga, he also released the song "Yeloi," which was nominated for Best Music Video of the Year award at the 2023 Ghana Music Awards USA.

Martey and the Akwaaba Ensemble were among the first artists to perform at the Nashua Center for the Arts after its opening in 2023. He released the single "Sugar" in 2023. The single was nominated for the Afropop/Afrobeat Song of the Year award at the 2024 Ghana Music Awards USA.

Martey performed for the 41st and 42nd Somersworth International Children's Festivals in 2023 and 2024. In 2024, Martey and the Akwaaba Ensemble also performed at the Derryfield School in Manchester, New Hampshire in celebration of Black History Month.

Martey has collaborated with artists such as Randy Armstrong, Steve Ferraris, Dan Perkins and the Manchester Choral Society. He also performed with the New Hampshire Theatre Project for the "Dreaming Again" production.

== Personal life ==
Martey is married to Katy Easterly Martey. They have two children, Theo Korley and Sarafina.

== Awards and nominations ==
Award/Event	Year	Category	Nominated work	Result
Governor's Arts Awards	2019	Arts Education	Theo Martey	Won
Best International Collaboration	2022	Ghana Music Awards USA	"Kilode (feat. Young Freezy)"	Won
US-Based Afropop Song of the Year	2022	Ghana Music Awards USA	"Kilode (feat. Young Freezy)"	Nominated
Best Music Video of the Year	2023	Ghana Music Awards USA	"Yeloi"	Nominated
Afropop/Afrobeat Song of the Year	2024	Ghana Music Awards USA	"Sugar"	Nominated

=== Discography ===
==== Albums (with Akwaaba Ensemble) ====
Title	Released	Label
Akwaaba Welcome Home	2008	Martey Records
Jei Elaaje Wo	2012	Martey Records

==== Singles ====
Title	Year	Album
"Pretty Jeniki"	2020	Non-album single
"Saka Saka (feat. Kotey Another"	2020	Non-album single
"Kilode (feat. Young Freezy/Cabrinny)"	2021	Non-album single
"Yeloi (feat. Kotey Another and Nii Funny)"	2021	Non-album single
"You're My Baby"	2022	Non-album single
"Sugar"	2023	Non-album single
"Super Star (feat. Keddi Gh and Cabrinny)	2024	Non-album single
