= Jindo Morishita =

Japanese footballer (born 1995)

Personal information
- Date of birth: 25 August 1995 (age 31)
- Place of birth: Japan
- Position: Forward

Team information
- Current team: Stade Marocain
- Number: 35

Youth career
- 2011–2013: Kurashiki Seiryo High School

College career
Years	Team	Apps	(Gls)
2014–2017	University of Tsukuba		

Senior career*
Years	Team	Apps	(Gls)
2019	Maestro United Zambia		
2021–2022	Ebusua Dwarfs		
2023–2024	Accra Great Olympics		
2024–	Stade Marocain		
- * Club domestic league appearances and goals

Jindo Morishita (Japanese: 森下仁道; born 25 August 1995) is a Japanese footballer who plays as a forward for Botola 2 club Stade Marocain. Besides Japan, he has played in the Netherlands, Zambia, Ghana, and Morocco.

== Career ==
Morishita started his career with Zambian side Maestro United Zambia.

Before the 2021 season, he signed for Ebusua Dwarfs in the Ghana Premier League (GPL). On 9 April 2021, Morishita debuted for Ebusua Dwarfs during a 1–1 draw with Eleven Wonders, becoming the first-ever Japanese player in the GPL. However, he suffered relegation to the Ghanaian second tier.

In 2024, Morishita signed for Botola 2 club Stade Marocain, becoming the first player from Japan to play professionally in Morocco.
