= Simon Martey =

Ghanaian footballer (born 1990)

Personal information
- Full name: Simon Korley Martey
- Date of birth: 22 December 1990 (age 35)
- Place of birth: Ghana
- Position: Right-back

Team information
- Current team: Ebusua Dwarfs
- Number: 30

Senior career*
| Years | Team | Apps | (Gls) |
| 2008 | International Allies | | |
| 2008–2009 | Asante Kotoko | | |
| 2009 | → Eleven Wise (loan) | | |
| 2011–2012 | Kessben | | |
| 2012 | Bofoakwa Tano | | |
| 2013 | Bechem United | | |
| 2013–2016 | International Allies | 16 | (0) |
| 2017 | Young Wise | | |
| 2018– | Ebusua Dwarfs | 60 | (2) |
- * Club domestic league appearances and goals

Simon Korley Martey (born 22 December 1990) is a Ghanaian football player who plays as a right-back for Cape Coast Ebusua Dwarfs. He previously played for International Allies.

== Career ==
In June 2008 he moved from International Allies F.C. to Asante Kotoko, after 6 months left the club from Accra and signs a contract by Eleven Wise in January 2009. After the bankrupt of Kessben F.C. left the club and signed for Bofoakwa Tano F.C. He played than two years with the team, before signed with Ghana Premier League promoted team Bechem United. Martey played a half year with the Berekum-based club and signed than in summer 2013 with Inter Allies FC. In February 2016, ahead of the 2016 season, Martey was named as the club's assistant captain. He left the club in December 2016, after the expiration of his contract. In 2018, he joined Cape Coast Ebusua Dwarfs.
