= Bolga All Stars S.C. =

Bolga All Stars
- Full name: Bolga All Stars Sporting Club
- Nickname: Bolga Juventus
- Ground: Bolgatanga Sports Stadium
- League: Division One League Zone 1A

Bolga All Stars Sporting Club is a Ghanaian professional football team that plays in the 1A Zone of the Ghana Division One League. Zone 1A has seven competing teams from the part of the Ashanti Region, Brong Ahafo Region and the three Northern Regions of Ghana. The team is based in Bolgatanga in the Upper East Region of Ghana.
