= 2019–20 Ghana Premier League =

64th season of top professional association football league in Ghana

- Season: 2019–20
- Matches played: 132
- Goals scored: 272 (2.06 per match)
- Top goalscorer: Victorien Adebayor (12 goals)
- Longest winning run: 3 matches Aduana Stars; Ashanti Gold; Berekum Chelsea; Elmina Sharks
- Longest unbeaten run: 8 matches Hearts of Oak
- Longest winless run: 14 matches King Faisal
- Longest losing run: 5 matches Ebusua Dwarfs

The 2019–20 Ghana Premier League was the 64th season of top professional association football league in Ghana. The season started on 28 December 2019. 18 teams compete in the league with each club playing each other twice, home and away, with the three clubs at the bottom of the league relegated to the Division One League.

== Season overview ==
With 18 clubs participating in the league, this marked the first time since 1980 that more than 16 clubs competed in the top division of Ghanaian football. King Faisal and Great Olympics were readmitted after separate court cases over unhappiness about their relegation from the top-flight in previous seasons. During a council meeting in October 2019 before the season began, the number of relegated teams was reduced from five to three.

The GFA announced that the league was suspended on March 15, 2020, in the middle of match-week 15, because of the global COVID-19 pandemic. On 31 May, the league was further suspended until at least 31 June.

On 30 June, the FA had a meeting and cancelled the league due to the COVID-19 pandemic. A meeting was held on 27 August 2020 to determine the start and logistics of the 2020–21 season.

== Teams ==
Team	Location	Venue	Capacity
Great Olympics	Accra	Accra Sports Stadium	40,000
King Faisal	Kumasi	Baba Yara Stadium	40,528
Ebusua Dwarfs	Cape Coast	Cape Coast Sports Stadium	15,000
Eleven Wonders	Techiman	Ohene Ameyaw Stadium	5,000
Karela United	Tarkwa	TNA Park	12,000
Asante Kotoko	Kumasi	Baba Yara Stadium	40,528
Liberty Professionals	Dansoman	Carl Reindorf Park	2,000
Bechem United	Bechem	Nana Gyeabour's Park	5,000
Hearts of Oak	Accra	Accra Sports Stadium	40,000
Aduana Stars	Dormaa Ahenkro	Agyeman Badu Stadium	7,000
Dreams	Accra	Dawu Sports Stadium	5,000
Inter Allies	Accra	Accra Sports Stadium	7,000
Ashanti Gold	Obuasi	Len Clay Stadium	30,000
Berekum Chelsea	Berekum	Golden City Sports Stadium	10,000
WAFA	Sogakope	Sogakope Red Bull Arena	1,000
Elmina Sharks	Elmina	Nduom Sports Stadium	15,000
Legon Cities	Accra	Accra Sports Stadium	40,000
Medeama	Tarkwa	TNA Park	5,000

== League table ==
Pos	Team	Pld	W	D	L	GF	GA	GD	Pts	Qualification or relegation
1	Aduana Stars	15	8	4	3	17	11	+6	28	Qualification for the Champions League
2	Berekum Chelsea	14	8	2	4	16	12	+4	26	
3	Asante Kotoko	14	7	4	3	14	7	+7	25	
4	Elmina Sharks	15	6	7	2	18	13	+5	25	
5	Ashanti Gold	15	7	4	4	12	10	+2	25	
6	Medeama (Note: Medeama were deducted 3 points due for fielding an unqualified player in their matchweek 12 victory over Great Olympics.)	15	8	3	4	18	11	+7	24	
7	Bechem United	15	6	4	5	15	14	+1	22	
8	Hearts of Oak	14	5	6	3	14	11	+3	21	
9	Great Olympics	15	6	2	7	17	19	−2	20	
10	WAFA	14	4	7	3	15	11	+4	19	
11	Inter Allies	14	5	4	5	22	21	+1	19	
12	Eleven Wonders	15	5	4	6	11	15	−4	19	
13	Dreams	15	4	4	7	10	11	−1	16	
14	Liberty Professionals	15	4	4	7	21	23	−2	16	
15	Legon Cities	15	3	7	5	12	18	−6	16	
16	Ebusua Dwarfs	15	4	3	8	13	20	−7	15	Relegation to Division One League
17	Karela United	15	2	5	8	10	16	−6	11	Relegation to Division One League
18	King Faisal	14	0	6	8	17	29	−12	6	Relegation to Division One League

Updated to match(es) played on 15 March 2020. Source: Ghana Premier League
Rules for classification: 1) Points; 2) Goal difference; 3) Goals scored; 4) If the champions, relegated teams or qualified teams for CAF competitions cannot be determined by rules 1 to 3, rules 4.1 and 4.2 are applied – 4.1) Points gained in head-to-head record between such teams; 4.2) Away goals scored in head-to-head record between such teams

== Season statistics ==
=== Top scorers ===
As of 15 March 2020

Rank	Player	Club	Goals
1	(Niger) Victorien Adebayor	Inter Allies	12
2	(Ghana) Yahaya Mohammed	Aduana Stars	11
3	(Ghana) Prince Opoku Agyemang	Medeama	10
4	(Ghana) Ibrahim Osman	King Faisal	8
4	(Ghana) Elvis Kyei Baffour	Liberty Professionals	8
4	(Ghana) Prince Kwabena Adu	Bechem United	8
7	(Ghana) Benjamin Bernard Boateng	Elmina Sharks	7
8	(Ghana) Kofi Kordzi	Hearts of Oak	6
8	(Ghana) Samuel Armah	Inter Allies	6
8	(Ghana) Seidu Abubakari	Ebusua Dwarfs	6
