= Cape Coast Ebusua Dwarfs =

Association football club in Cape Coast

Ebusua Dwarfs
- Full name: Cape Coast Mysterious Ebusua Dwarfs Football Club
- Nicknames: Ebusua Dwarfs; The Crabs 'Mysterious' Dwarfs
- Founded: 1932; 94 years ago
- Ground: Cape Coast Sports Stadium, Cape Coast
- Capacity: 15,000
- President: Nana Sam Brew Butler
- Manager: Ernest Thompson Quartey
- League: Ghana Premier League
- 2019–20: 16th
- Website: ebusuadwarfsfc.com
Home colours	Away colours

Cape Coast Mysterious Ebusua Dwarfs is a Ghanaian professional football club based in Cape Coast. The club competes in the Ghana Premier League, the Premier division on the Ghanaian football pyramid, and holds home games at the Cape Coast Sports Stadium.

== History ==
The club's etymology is of unknown origin, with some suggesting that the mythical status of dwarves in Ghanaian society could have contributed to the name. The word ebusua means family in the local language, underlying the clubs's traditional roots.

Founded in 1932, Ebusua Dwarfs was one of the founding members of the Ghana Premier League and won the 1966 Ghana Premier League. Ebusua Dwarfs was also the first winner of the Presidential Cup in 1970 when the idea of FA Cup and League Championships was introduced in Ghana. It was called the Prime Minister's Cup. Ebusua Dwarfs again won the first SWAG Cup by beating Hearts of Oak 4–2. Ebusua Dwarfs was one of the eight teams invited to play in the first-ever Ghana FA Cup, losing 6–0 in the semifinals to Hearts of Oak after defeating their rivals Vipers 2–0. Dwarfs defeated Ho Mighty Eagles 4–2 to win the 1968 FA Cup final.

The Dwarfs also appeared in the 1993 and 1994 finals, losing on penalties to Goldfields in 1993 and losing to Hearts of Oak in 1994 2–1 after taking a lead. Cape Coast Mysterious Dwarfs FC is the third Ghanaian club to represent Ghana in Africa after Real Republicans and Asante Kotoko in that order.

Cape Coast Dwarfs appeared in the 2000 CAF Cup, losing to Ismaily of Egypt 6–0 in the quarterfinals but not before defeating Wydad Casablanca.

Famous Black Stars goalkeeper Robert Mensah got his start with the Dwarfs in the 1960s.

Nana Aidoo, the Dwarfs C.E.O and chief financier, died in 2018. The club would face severe economic troubles since then, having struggled to pay wages and maintain infrastructure. Many of their key players were sold off as the club faced complete liquidation.

== Grounds ==
Cape Coast Ebusua Dwarfs play home matches at the Cape Coast Sports Stadium. The Cape Coast Sports Stadium holds an estimated capacity of 15,000 seats. The club plans to build a state-of-the-art facility after the supporters purchased a parcel of land to build their first training pitch.

== Rivalries ==
Cape Coast Mysterious Ebusua Dwarfs' longest established rivalry is with Cape Coast Venomous Vipers FC. Elmina Sharks FC. have also been considered as local rivals in recent times.

== Honours ==
=== National Titles ===
- Ghana Premier League: 1

1965–66

- FA Cup: 1

1968

== Performance in CAF competitions ==
- CAF Cup

2000 CAF Cup - quarterfinals

- CAF Confederation Cup: 1 appearance

2014 - First Round

== Current squad ==
As of February 2021. Note: Flags indicate national team as defined under FIFA eligibility rules; some limited exceptions apply. Players may hold more than one non-FIFA nationality.

No.	Pos.	Nation	Player
1	GK	GHA	Bright Quaye
3	DF	GHA	Emmanuel Anaful
4	DF	GHA	Dennis Nkrumah Korsah (Captain)
5	DF	GHA	Abert Gaisie
6	DF	GHA	Amos Korankye
7	MF	CIV	Richard Amoah
8	MF	GHA	Abu Naba Junior
9	FW	GHA	Obed Bentum
10	FW	GHA	Albert Ato Hammond
11	DF	GHA	Abdul Dramani
12	DF	GHA	Leventus Arthur
13	DF	GHA	Godwin Adikah
16	GK	GHA	Abass Abdulai
14	MF	GHA	Mark Enoch Acquah
15	MF	GHA	Leslie Kieran Davis
17	MF	GHA	Michael Asamoah
18	MF	GHA	George Asamoah

No.	Pos.	Nation	Player
19	FW	GHA	Martin Tsiboah
20	DF	GHA	Simon Martey
22	GK	GHA	Danso Wiredu Mensah
23	MF	GHA	Julius Akoto
24	GK	GHA	Razak Issah
25	MF	GHA	Benjamin Acquah
26	MF	GHA	Ellia Kofi Junior
27	FW	GHA	Moro Sumaila
28	DF	GHA	Prince Kpodo
29	FW	GHA	Seidu Abubakari
30	FW	GHA	Ishmael Antwi
35	FW	GHA	Richard Addai
—	FW	JPN	Jindo Morishita

== Club captains ==
- Nicholas Gyan (2016–2018)
- Joseph Amoah Mensah (2018)
- Dennis Nkrumah-Korsah (2019–present)
