= Abraham Wayo =

Ghanaian professional footballer

Personal information
- Date of birth: 1 August 2003 (age 23)
- Place of birth: Ghana
- Position: Midfielder

Team information
- Current team: Étoile du Sahel
- Number: 37

Senior career*
Years	Team	Apps	(Gls)
2019–2021	Liberty Professionals	45	(7)
2021–2022	Étoile du Sahel	3	(0)
2024-	MA Tétouan	0	(0)
- * Club domestic league appearances and goals as of 5 August 2023

Abraham Wayo (born 1 August 2003) is a Ghanaian footballer who currently plays as a midfielder for Tunisian Ligue Professionnelle 1 club Étoile Sportive du Sahel. He previously played for Ghana Premier League side Liberty Professionals F.C.

== Career ==
=== Liberty Professionals ===
Wayo started his career with Liberty Professionals in October 2019. He made his debut on 29 December 2019, after coming on at half time for Ernest Mwankurinah in a 2–2 draw against Legon Cities. At the end of the 2020–21 season, he scored 7 goals and made 7 assists in 32 league appearances and also won three man of the match awards in the process, ending the season as the club's top goal scorer. With Liberty Professional's failure to maintain in the top flight league due to being relegated to the Ghana Division One League, he was linked with a move to Premier League sides Asante Kotoko and Hearts of Oak.

=== Étoile du Sahel ===
On 30 August 2021, Wayo joined Tunisian club Étoile Sportive du Sahel on a four-year contract until 2025.
