= Liberty Professionals F.C. =

Association football club in Dansoman

Liberty Professionals FC
- Full name: Liberty Professional Football Club
- Founded: 1996
- Ground: Dansoman Park; Dansoman, Accra, Ghana
- Capacity: 2,000
- League: Ghana Premier League
Home colours	Away colours

Liberty Professionals Football Club is a Ghanaian professional football club based in Dansoman, Accra.

== History ==
Liberty Professionals was founded in 1996 by Accra-based businessmen Felix Ansong and Alhaji Sly Tetteh. The club was one of the earliest in Ghana to adopt a professional approach to the management of a football club. The club started their first season in the Poly Tank Division One League, but were promoted to the Ghana Telecom Premier League within their second season in 1998. Since then, the club has consistently maintained respectable league match performances. As of 2020, the team had an estimated net worth of $4.31million.

In July 2021, the club was relegated to the Ghana Division One League at the end of the 2020–21 season, after 22 years in the Ghana Premier League since gaining promotion in 1998.

== Performance in CAF competitions ==
- West African Club Championship (UFOA Cup): 1 appearance

2009 – Third

Liberty Professionals FC old logo.

== Stadium ==
Their home stadium is Carl Reindorf Park which can seat up to 2,000 people. In April 2021, during the latter part of the 2020–21 season they switched to WAFA (West African Football Academy) Stadium in Sogakope.

== Current squad ==
As of 1 January 2021

Note: Flags indicate national team as defined under FIFA eligibility rules; some limited exceptions apply. Players may hold more than one non-FIFA nationality.

No.	Pos.	Nation	Player
1	GK	GHA	Daniel Amissah
2	DF	GHA	Michael Nii Laryea
3	FW	GHA	Owusu Adam Mohammed
4	DF	GHA	Godfred Atuahene
5	MF	GHA	George Amoako
7	MF	GHA	Emmauel Issaka
8	MF	GHA	Issah Mubashar
9	FW	GHA	Maxwell Kavar
10	MF	GHA	Degraft Amponsah
11	FW	GHA	Kwaku Karikari
12	DF	GHA	Samuel Amofa
13	DF	GHA	Maxwell Ansah
14	MF	GHA	Simon Appiah Asamoah
15	DF	GHA	Ernest Danso
16	GK	GHA	Ganiwu Shaibu
17	FW	GHA	George William Ansong

No.	Pos.	Nation	Player
18	DF	GHA	Fuseini Mohammed
19	DF	GHA	Ahmed Satar
20	DF	GHA	Emmanuel Kumi
21	DF	GHA	Paul Kwame
22	GK	GHA	Kofi Baah
23	DF	GHA	Benash Quansah
24	MF	GHA	Abraham Wayo
25	MF	GHA	Abdul Razak Boame
26	FW	GHA	Daniel Antwi
27	MF	GHA	Stanley Nii Agyei
28	MF	GHA	Francis Tanko
29	FW	GHA	Seedorf Asante
30	FW	GHA	Emmanuel Paga
31	MF	GHA	Brite Andoh
33	DF	GHA	Evans Owusu

== Academy ==
Liberty Professionals have three youth academies in Kenya, Togo and Ghana. Michael Essien played for the Ghana Academy for the 1998–99 season. Mubarak Alhassan, an academy graduate joined Granada CF in 2020. Abraham Wayo an academy graduate ended the 2020–21 season as the club's top goal scorer and later secured a deal to Tunisian Ligue Professionnelle 1 club Étoile Sportive du Sahel.

== Managers ==
- (Ghana) Sellas Tetteh (1996–2001)
- (Ghana) Cecil Jones Attuquayefio (2002)
- (Ghana) Sellas Tetteh (2009–2010)
- (Ghana) Joseph Emmanuel Sarpong (Jan 1, 2011 – July 8, 2012)
- (Ghana) George Lamptey (July 1, 2012–Oct 1, 2016)
- (Ghana) Michael Osei (May 2017 –February 2018)
- (Ghana) David Ocloo (December 2019 –April 2021)
- (Ghana) Andy Sinason & Sellas Tetteh (interim) (April 2021 –)
