= 2007 FIFA U-17 World Cup squads =

This article lists all the confirmed national football squads for the 2007 FIFA U-17 World Cup held in South Korea between 18 August and 9 September 2007. The final squads were to be submitted to FIFA at least 10 working days before the opening match of the competition. Each squad contains 21 players, which consists of 3 goalkeepers and 18 outfield players. Before announcing their final squads, teams were allowed to name a provisional squad of 23 to 35 players, which then had to be reduced to their final 21. Players marked with (c) were named captains for their respective teams.

Players marked with bold are capped for a senior national team at some stage in their career.

== Group A ==
=== Costa Rica ===
Head coach: (Costa Rica) Manuel Ureña

No.	Pos.	Player	Date of birth (age)	Caps	Club
1	GK	Leonel Moreira	2 April 1990 (aged 17)		(Costa Rica) Herediano
2	DF	Seemore Johnson	29 October 1991 (aged 15)		(Costa Rica) Alajuelense
3	DF	Roy Smith	19 April 1990 (aged 17)		(Costa Rica) Brujas
4	DF	Jordan Smith	23 April 1991 (aged 16)		(Costa Rica) Saprissa
5	MF	Esteban Luna	5 January 1990 (aged 17)		(Costa Rica) Saprissa
6	DF	Francis Godínez	22 April 1990 (aged 17)		(Costa Rica) Saprissa
7	MF	Diego Brenes	24 August 1990 (aged 16)		(Costa Rica) Alajuelense
8	MF	David Guzmán	18 February 1990 (aged 17)		(Costa Rica) Saprissa
9	FW	Marco Ureña	5 March 1990 (aged 17)		(Costa Rica) Alajuelense
10	FW	Jorge Castro	11 September 1990 (aged 16)		(Costa Rica) Saprissa
11	MF	Jessy Peralta	22 July 1990 (aged 17)		(Costa Rica) Saprissa
12	DF	Bruno Castro	6 August 1990 (aged 17)		(Costa Rica) Herediano
13	DF	Erick Rojas	6 February 1990 (aged 17)		(Costa Rica) Alajuelense
14	DF	Rodrigo Herra	20 October 1990 (aged 16)		(Costa Rica) Saprissa
15	MF	Julio Ibarra	6 January 1990 (aged 17)		(Costa Rica) Alajuelense
16	MF	Daniel Arias	9 March 1991 (aged 16)		(Costa Rica) Saprissa
17	FW	Josué Martínez	25 March 1990 (aged 17)		(Costa Rica) Saprissa
18	GK	Guillermo Camacho	25 April 1990 (aged 17)		(Costa Rica) Venecia de San Carlos
19	MF	Daniel Varela	30 April 1990 (aged 17)		(Costa Rica) Alfaro Ruiz
20	MF	Miguel Brenes	31 May 1990 (aged 17)		(Costa Rica) Alajuelense
21	GK	Stanley Jiménez	13 February 1990 (aged 17)		(Costa Rica) AD Ramonense

=== South Korea ===
Head coach: (South Korea) Park Kyung-hoon

No.	Pos.	Player	Date of birth (age)	Caps	Club
1	GK	Kim Seung-gyu	30 September 1990 (aged 16)		(South Korea) Ulsan Hyundai
2	DF	Han Yong-su	5 May 1990 (aged 17)		(South Korea) Joongdong High School
3	DF	Yun Suk-young	13 February 1990 (aged 17)		(South Korea) Jeonnam Dragons
4	DF	Lim Jong-eun	18 June 1990 (aged 17)		(South Korea) Hyundai High School
5	DF	Kim Dong-chul	1 October 1990 (aged 16)		(South Korea) Taesung High School
6	MF	Cho Beom-seok	9 January 1990 (aged 17)		(South Korea) Shingal High School
7	DF	Lee Yong-joon	3 April 1990 (aged 17)		(South Korea) Hyundai High School
8	MF	Yoon Bit-garam	7 May 1990 (aged 17)		(South Korea) Bukyung High School
9	FW	Bae Chun-suk	27 April 1990 (aged 17)		(South Korea) Pohang Steelers
10	MF	Choi Jin-soo	17 June 1990 (aged 17)		(South Korea) Hyundai High School
11	FW	Seol Jae-mun	8 January 1990 (aged 17)		(South Korea) Taesung High School
12	DF	Oh Jae-suk	4 January 1990 (aged 17)		(South Korea) Shingal High School
13	MF	Han Kook-young	19 April 1990 (aged 17)		(South Korea) Moonsung High School
14	MF	Kim Jung-hyun	3 January 1990 (aged 17)		(South Korea) Hyundai High School
15	MF	Kim Eun-hu	23 May 1990 (aged 17)		(South Korea) Shingal High School
16	FW	Park Jae-cheol	29 March 1990 (aged 17)		(South Korea) Shingal High School
17	FW	Lee Yong-jae	8 June 1991 (aged 16)		(South Korea) Pohang Steelers
18	FW	Joo Sung-hwan	24 August 1990 (aged 16)		(South Korea) Jeonam Dragons
19	DF	Jeong Hyun-yoon	9 April 1990 (aged 17)		(South Korea) Jeonnam Dragons
20	GK	Kim Tae-hong	12 June 1990 (aged 17)		(South Korea) Jeonnam Dragons
21	GK	Lee Hee-seong	27 May 1990 (aged 17)		(South Korea) Hyundai High School

=== Peru ===
Head coach: (Peru) Juan José Oré

No.	Pos.	Player	Date of birth (age)	Caps	Club
1	GK	Éder Hermoza	4 April 1990 (aged 17)		(Peru) Alianza Lima
2	DF	Jersi Socola	7 July 1990 (aged 17)		(Peru) Alianza Lima
3	DF	Anthony Molina	13 August 1990 (aged 17)		(Peru) Universidad San Martín de Porres
4	DF	Joseph Muñoz	6 January 1990 (aged 17)		(Peru) Esther Grande de Bentin
5	DF	Néstor Duarte	8 September 1990 (aged 16)		(Peru) Academia Deportiva Cantolao
6	MF	Bryan Salazar	1 June 1990 (aged 17)		(Peru) Sporting Cristal
7	MF	Reimond Manco	23 August 1990 (aged 16)		(Peru) Alianza Lima
8	MF	Carlos Bazalar	19 March 1990 (aged 17)		(Peru) Cienciano
9	FW	Irven Ávila	2 July 1990 (aged 17)		(Peru) Deportivo Real
10	MF	Daniel Sánchez	2 May 1990 (aged 17)		(Peru) Sporting Cristal
11	MF	Luis Trujillo	27 December 1990 (aged 16)		(Peru) Alianza Lima
12	GK	Pedro Gallese	23 February 1990 (aged 17)		(Peru) Universidad San Martín de Porres
13	DF	Manuel Calderón	28 January 1990 (aged 17)		(Peru) Deportivo Curibamba
14	MF	Ernesto Salazar	31 May 1990 (aged 17)		(Peru) Alianza Lima
15	DF	Jairo Hernández	2 March 1990 (aged 17)		(Peru) Alianza Lima
16	DF	Juan Arce	9 January 1990 (aged 17)		(Peru) Sporting Cristal
17	DF	Juan Zevallos	7 July 1990 (aged 17)		(Peru) Universitario
18	MF	César Ruiz	10 January 1990 (aged 17)		(Peru) Sporting Cristal
19	FW	Christian La Torre	9 March 1990 (aged 17)		(Peru) Sport Boys
20	MF	Gary Correa	23 May 1990 (aged 17)		(Peru) Universitario
21	GK	Víctor Ulloa	15 March 1991 (aged 16)		(Peru) Sporting Cristal

=== Togo ===
Head coach: (Germany) Paul Sauter

No.	Pos.	Player	Date of birth (age)	Caps	Club
1	GK	Baba Tchagouni	31 December 1990 (aged 16)		(Togo) Planete Foot
2	FW	Tidjani Biliaminou	31 December 1990 (aged 16)		(Togo) Planete Foot
3	DF	Awali Mamah	15 August 1991 (aged 16)		(Togo) Academy Delta
4	MF	Prince Segbefia	11 March 1991 (aged 16)		(Togo) Sporting Club
5	MF	Sapol Mani	5 June 1991 (aged 16)		(Togo) Maranatha
6	DF	Alex Kinvi-Boh	20 December 1991 (aged 15)		(Togo) US Masséda
7	MF	Lalawélé Atakora	9 November 1990 (aged 16)		(Togo) Academy Delta
8	MF	Alikem Segbefia	1 April 1990 (aged 17)		(Togo) Sporting Club
9	FW	Abdjou-Fatawou Dodja	24 December 1991 (aged 15)		(Togo) Academy Delta
10	MF	Malick Korodowou	15 December 1990 (aged 16)		(Togo) Planete Foot
11	MF	Mohamed Abdoulaye	25 September 1991 (aged 15)		(Togo) Étoile Filante
12	MF	Smaila Tchadenou	31 December 1990 (aged 16)		(Togo) Golden Players
13	DF	James Loembe	25 March 1991 (aged 16)		(Togo) Academy Delta
14	DF	Koami Ayao	16 December 1991 (aged 15)		(Togo) AS Douane
15	DF	Papa Koami Awounyo	3 August 1991 (aged 16)		(Togo) US Masséda
16	GK	Mensah Nsouhoho	31 December 1990 (aged 16)		(Togo) Planete Foot
17	FW	Camaldine Abraw	15 August 1990 (aged 17)		(Togo) Academy Delta
18	FW	Safiou Saibou	31 December 1991 (aged 15)		(Togo) AS Douane
19	MF	Koffi Alofa	13 July 1990 (aged 17)		(Togo) FC Tesco
20	FW	Backer Aloenouvo	4 July 1990 (aged 17)		(Togo) US Masséda
21	GK	Tidjani Sodeke	22 July 1990 (aged 17)		(France) Louhans-Cuiseaux

== Group B ==
=== Brazil ===
Head coach: (Brazil) Lucho Nizzo

No.	Pos.	Player	Date of birth (age)	Caps	Club
1	GK	Marcelo Carné	6 February 1990 (aged 17)		(Brazil) Flamengo
2	DF	Rafael	9 July 1990 (aged 17)		(Brazil) Fluminense
3	DF	Lázaro	28 June 1990 (aged 17)		(Brazil) Atlético Mineiro
4	DF	Rafael Forster	23 July 1990 (aged 17)		(Brazil) Internacional
5	MF	Tiago Dutra	17 September 1990 (aged 16)		(Brazil) Grêmio
6	DF	Fabio	9 July 1990 (aged 17)		(Brazil) Fluminense
7	FW	Luiz Júnior	23 April 1990 (aged 17)		(Brazil) Botafogo
8	MF	Fellipe Bastos	1 February 1990 (aged 17)		(Brazil) Botafogo
9	FW	Maicon	18 February 1990 (aged 17)		(Brazil) Fluminense
10	MF	Lulinha	10 April 1990 (aged 17)		(Brazil) Corinthians
11	MF	Alex Teixeira	6 January 1990 (aged 17)		(Brazil) Vasco da Gama
12	GK	Renan Ribeiro	23 March 1990 (aged 17)		(Brazil) Atlético Mineiro
13	DF	Michel Macedo	15 February 1990 (aged 17)		(Brazil) Flamengo
14	DF	Lucas Galdino	28 June 1990 (aged 17)		(Brazil) Flamengo
15	DF	Daniel	14 September 1990 (aged 16)		(Brazil) Internacional
16	DF	Bruno Collaço	8 March 1990 (aged 17)		(Brazil) Grêmio
17	MF	Tales	20 January 1990 (aged 17)		(Brazil) Internacional
18	MF	Giuliano	31 May 1990 (aged 17)		(Brazil) Paraná
19	FW	Choco	4 January 1990 (aged 17)		(Brazil) Atlético Paranaense
20	FW	Fabinho	17 March 1990 (aged 17)		(Brazil) Internacional
21	GK	Leonardo	22 September 1990 (aged 16)		(Brazil) São Paulo

=== England ===
Head coach: (England) John Peacock

No.	Pos.	Player	Date of birth (age)	Caps	Club
1	GK	Jason Steele	18 August 1990 (aged 17)		(England) Middlesbrough
2	DF	Nana Ofori-Twumasi	15 May 1990 (aged 17)		(England) Chelsea
3	DF	James Reid	28 February 1990 (aged 17)		(England) Nottingham Forest
4	MF	Henri Lansbury	12 October 1990 (aged 16)		(England) Arsenal
5	MF	Krystian Pearce	5 January 1990 (aged 17)		(England) Birmingham City
6	DF	Tommy Smith	31 March 1990 (aged 17)		(England) Ipswich Town
7	FW	Danny Welbeck	26 November 1990 (aged 16)		(England) Manchester United
8	MF	Danny Rose	2 July 1990 (aged 17)		(England) Tottenham
9	FW	Rhys Murphy	6 November 1990 (aged 16)		(England) Arsenal
10	FW	Victor Moses	12 December 1990 (aged 16)		(England) Crystal Palace
11	MF	Nathan Porritt	9 January 1990 (aged 17)		(England) Middlesbrough
12	MF	Dan Gosling	1 February 1990 (aged 17)		(England) Plymouth Argyle
13	GK	Alex Smithies	5 March 1990 (aged 17)		(England) Huddersfield Town
14	MF	Michael Woods	6 April 1990 (aged 17)		(England) Chelsea
15	DF	Jordan Spence	24 May 1990 (aged 17)		(England) West Ham United
16	DF	Gavin Hoyte	6 June 1990 (aged 17)		(England) Arsenal
17	FW	Tristan Plummer	30 January 1990 (aged 17)		(England) Bristol City
18	FW	Jonathan Franks	8 April 1990 (aged 17)		(England) Middlesbrough
19	FW	Ashley Chambers	1 March 1990 (aged 17)		(England) Leicester City
20	MF	Medy Elito	20 March 1990 (aged 17)		(England) Colchester United
21	GK	Wes Foderingham	14 January 1991 (aged 16)		(England) Fulham

=== North Korea ===
Head coach: (North Korea) Kim Myong-chol

No.	Pos.	Player	Date of birth (age)	Caps	Club
1	GK	O Mun-song	14 December 1990 (aged 16)		(North Korea) Sobaeksu
2	DF	Sim Hyon-jin	1 January 1991 (aged 16)		(North Korea) Sobaeksu
3	DF	Ri Hyong-mu	4 November 1991 (aged 15)		(North Korea) Sobaeksu
4	DF	Kang Kuk-chol	1 July 1990 (aged 17)		(North Korea) Pyongyang
5	DF	Kang Chol-ryong	20 June 1990 (aged 17)		(North Korea) Sobaeksu
6	DF	Han Kyong-gwang	16 February 1990 (aged 17)		(North Korea) Sobaeksu
7	MF	Myong Cha-hyon	20 March 1990 (aged 17)		(North Korea) Sobaeksu
8	MF	Jong Il-ju	27 January 1990 (aged 17)		(North Korea) Sobaeksu
9	MF	Ri Sang-chol	26 December 1990 (aged 16)		(North Korea) Amrokgang
10	MF	An Il-bom	2 December 1990 (aged 16)		(North Korea) Sobaeksu
11	FW	Pak Kwang-ryong	21 September 1992 (aged 14)		(North Korea) Kigwancha
12	MF	Pak Hyong-jin	6 July 1990 (aged 17)		(North Korea) Sobaeksu
13	MF	Pak Yu-il	5 January 1990 (aged 17)		(North Korea) Sobaeksu
14	MF	An Hyok-il	10 January 1991 (aged 16)		(North Korea) Pyongyang
15	FW	Rim Chol-min	24 November 1990 (aged 16)		(North Korea) Sobaeksu
16	FW	An Byong-jun	22 May 1990 (aged 17)		(Japan) Korea Secondary School
17	FW	Ri Myong-jun	16 August 1990 (aged 17)		(North Korea) Sobaeksu
18	GK	Kim Jin-won	18 February 1991 (aged 16)		(North Korea) Sobaeksu
19	DF	Kang Kyong-hak	16 May 1990 (aged 17)		(Japan) Korea Secondary School
20	MF	O Jin-hyok	28 February 1990 (aged 17)		(North Korea) Rimyongsu
21	GK	Mun Jong-hyok	6 March 1991 (aged 16)		(North Korea) Wolmido

=== New Zealand ===
Head coach: (New Zealand) Colin Tuaa

No.	Pos.	Player	Date of birth (age)	Caps	Club
1	GK	Michael O'Keeffe	9 August 1990 (aged 17)		(New Zealand) Avon United
2	DF	Anthony Hobbs	6 April 1991 (aged 16)		(New Zealand) Glenfield Rovers
3	DF	Mars Keomahavong	31 July 1990 (aged 17)		(New Zealand) North Shore United
4	MF	Colin Murphy	19 March 1991 (aged 16)		(New Zealand) Hamilton Wanderers
5	DF	Tim Myers	17 September 1990 (aged 16)		(Australia) Eastern Suburbs
6	DF	Nick Corliss	15 November 1990 (aged 16)		(New Zealand) Onehunga Sports
7	MF	Jacob Mathews	18 June 1990 (aged 17)		(New Zealand) Central United
8	MF	Cory Chettleburgh	21 August 1991 (aged 15)		(New Zealand) Palmerston North Marist
9	FW	Kosta Barbarouses	19 February 1990 (aged 17)		(New Zealand) Wellington Phoenix
10	FW	Moses Petelo	12 March 1990 (aged 17)		(New Zealand) Western Suburbs FC
11	MF	Ben Hunt	19 January 1990 (aged 17)		(New Zealand) Onehunga Sports
12	DF	Fraser Colson	19 March 1990 (aged 17)		(New Zealand) Western Suburbs FC
13	FW	Geoffrey Macintyre	11 February 1990 (aged 17)		(New Zealand) Western Suburbs FC
14	FW	Chris Wood	7 December 1991 (aged 15)		(New Zealand) Hamilton Wanderers
15	MF	Tyson Brandt	28 August 1990 (aged 16)		(New Zealand) Team Taranaki
16	DF	Godwin Darkwa	7 January 1991 (aged 16)		(New Zealand) North Shore United
17	MF	Jason Hicks	16 January 1990 (aged 17)		(New Zealand) Glenfield Rovers
18	MF	Hamish Chang	31 March 1990 (aged 17)		(New Zealand) Western Suburbs FC
19	DF	Adam Cowen	13 June 1990 (aged 17)		(New Zealand) Christchurch Rangers
20	GK	Jake Gleeson	26 June 1990 (aged 17)		(New Zealand) Western Suburbs FC
21	GK	Ernest Wong	10 November 1990 (aged 16)		(New Zealand) Eastern Suburbs

== Group C ==
=== Argentina ===
Head coach: (Argentina) Miguel Angel Tojo

No.	Pos.	Player	Date of birth (age)	Caps	Club
1	GK	Luis Ojeda	21 March 1990 (aged 17)		(Argentina) Unión de Santa Fe
2	DF	Mateo Musacchio	26 August 1990 (aged 16)		(Argentina) River Plate
3	DF	Maximiliano Oliva	4 March 1990 (aged 17)		(Argentina) River Plate
4	DF	Damián Martínez	31 January 1990 (aged 17)		(Argentina) San Lorenzo
5	MF	Fernando Godoy	1 May 1990 (aged 17)		(Argentina) Independiente
6	DF	Fernando Meza	21 March 1990 (aged 17)		(Argentina) San Lorenzo
7	FW	Eduardo Salvio	13 July 1990 (aged 17)		(Argentina) Lanus
8	DF	Mariano Bíttolo	24 April 1990 (aged 17)		(Argentina) Velez Sarsfield
9	FW	Gustavo Fernández	4 August 1990 (aged 17)		(Argentina) River Plate
10	FW	Santiago Fernández	29 June 1990 (aged 17)		(Argentina) Newell's Old Boys
11	MF	Pablo Rolón	2 April 1990 (aged 17)		(Argentina) Talleres
12	GK	Rodrigo Meza	12 February 1990 (aged 17)		(Argentina) San Lorenzo
13	MF	Franco Zuculini	5 September 1990 (aged 16)		(Argentina) Racing Club
14	DF	Alexis Machuca	10 May 1990 (aged 17)		(Argentina) Newell's Old Boys
15	DF	Leandro Basterrechea	9 April 1990 (aged 17)		(Argentina) Gimnasia y Esgrima de La Plata
16	DF	Gastón Sauro	23 February 1990 (aged 17)		(Argentina) Boca Juniors
17	FW	Carlos Benítez	10 April 1990 (aged 17)		(Argentina) San Lorenzo
18	FW	Nicolás Mazzola	28 January 1990 (aged 17)		(Argentina) Independiente
19	MF	Guido Pizarro	26 February 1990 (aged 17)		(Argentina) Lanus
20	MF	Daniel Carrizo	19 January 1990 (aged 17)		(Argentina) River Plate
21	GK	José Luis Cornaló	3 January 1990 (aged 17)		(Argentina) Independiente

=== Honduras ===
Head coach: (Honduras) Miguel Escalante

No.	Pos.	Player	Date of birth (age)	Caps	Club
1	GK	Francisco Reyes	7 February 1990 (aged 17)		(Honduras) Victoria
2	DF	Gustavo Carías	22 July 1991 (aged 16)		(Honduras) Municipal Valencia
3	DF	Angel Castro	8 September 1990 (aged 16)		(Honduras) Olimpia
4	DF	Fredy Escobar	18 April 1990 (aged 17)		(Honduras) Marathón
5	DF	José Fonseca	27 May 1990 (aged 17)		(Honduras) Olimpia
6	DF	Kevin Castro	22 August 1990 (aged 16)		(Honduras) Olimpia
7	FW	Julio Ocampo	12 February 1990 (aged 17)		(Honduras) Victoria
8	MF	Orlin Peralta	12 February 1990 (aged 17)		(Honduras) Vida
9	FW	Fredy Sosa	30 January 1990 (aged 17)		(Honduras) Olimpia
10	FW	Christian Martínez	8 September 1990 (aged 16)		(Honduras) Victoria
11	FW	Roger Rojas	9 June 1990 (aged 17)		(Honduras) Olimpia
12	GK	Oscar López	7 March 1990 (aged 17)		(Honduras) Platense
13	DF	Arael Lanza	31 January 1990 (aged 17)		(Honduras) Municipal Valencia
14	MF	César Oseguera	20 July 1990 (aged 17)		(Honduras) Real España
15	MF	Ronald Martínez	26 July 1990 (aged 17)		(Honduras) Motagua
16	DF	Johnny Leverón	7 February 1990 (aged 17)		(Honduras) Motagua
17	MF	Luis Garrido	5 November 1990 (aged 16)		(Honduras) Juticalpa FC
18	FW	Carlos Alexis Cruz	2 November 1990 (aged 16)		(Honduras) Olimpia
19	MF	Carlos Castellanos	9 January 1991 (aged 16)		(Honduras) Marathón
20	MF	Alfredo Mejía	3 April 1990 (aged 17)		(Honduras) Real España
21	GK	Marlon Licona	9 February 1991 (aged 16)		(Honduras) Motagua

=== Spain ===
Head coach: (Spain) Juan Santisteban

No.	Pos.	Player	Date of birth (age)	Caps	Club
1	GK	Yelco Ramos	21 January 1990 (aged 17)		(Spain) Villarreal
2	DF	Álex Bolaños	6 January 1990 (aged 17)		(Spain) Barcelona
3	DF	Alberto Morgado	10 May 1990 (aged 17)		(Spain) Alavés
4	DF	David Rochela	19 February 1990 (aged 17)		(Spain) Deportivo La Coruña
5	DF	Nacho	18 January 1990 (aged 17)		(Spain) Real Madrid
6	MF	Ignacio Camacho	4 May 1990 (aged 17)		(Spain) Atlético Madrid
7	MF	Ximo Forner	27 January 1990 (aged 17)		(Spain) Valencia
8	MF	David González	20 January 1990 (aged 17)		(Spain) Barcelona
9	FW	Bojan	28 August 1990 (aged 16)		(Spain) Barcelona
10	MF	Fran Mérida	4 March 1990 (aged 17)		(England) Arsenal
11	FW	Isma López	29 January 1990 (aged 17)		(Spain) Athletic Bilbao
12	MF	Lucas Porcar	18 February 1990 (aged 17)		(Spain) Espanyol
13	GK	David de Gea	7 November 1990 (aged 16)		(Spain) Atlético Madrid
14	MF	Iago Falque	4 January 1990 (aged 17)		(Spain) Barcelona
15	DF	Sergio Rodríguez	22 August 1990 (aged 16)		(Spain) Atlético Madrid
16	FW	Dani Aquino	27 July 1990 (aged 17)		(Spain) Murcia
17	DF	Pichu Atienza	18 January 1990 (aged 17)		(Spain) Atlético Madrid
18	MF	Sergio Tejera	28 May 1990 (aged 17)		(England) Chelsea
19	MF	Jordi Pablo	1 January 1990 (aged 17)		(Spain) Villarreal
20	MF	Asier Illarramendi	8 March 1990 (aged 17)		(Spain) Real Sociedad
21	GK	Diego Mariño	9 May 1990 (aged 17)		(Spain) Villarreal

=== Syria ===
Head coach: (Syria) Mohamad Aljomaa

No.	Pos.	Player	Date of birth (age)	Caps	Club
1	GK	Ahmad Madania	1 January 1990 (aged 17)		(Syria) Teshrin
2	DF	Ahmad Al Saleh	20 May 1990 (aged 17)		(Syria) Al-Jaish
3	DF	Mohamad Zbida	20 May 1990 (aged 17)		(Syria) Al-Wahda
4	DF	Khaled Al-Brijawi	8 July 1990 (aged 17)		(Syria) Al-Majd
5	DF	Abd Al Naser Hasan	28 October 1990 (aged 16)		(Syria) Unknown
6	MF	Hussam Al Hamawi	22 August 1990 (aged 16)		(Syria) Al-Majd
7	FW	Ziad Ajouz	18 January 1990 (aged 17)		(Syria) Teshrin
8	DF	Adnan Haj Yousef	20 January 1990 (aged 17)		(Syria) Al-Ittihad
9	MF	Tamer Haj Mohamad	3 April 1990 (aged 17)		(Syria) Al-Karamah
10	MF	Mohamad Mido	11 June 1990 (aged 17)		(Syria) Al-Ittihad
11	FW	Mohammad Abadi	3 September 1990 (aged 16)		(Syria) Al-Futowa
12	DF	Ahmed Afash	2 July 1994 (aged 13)		(Syria) Al-Ittihad
13	MF	Mohamad Zaytoun	15 September 1990 (aged 16)		(Syria) Jableh
14	MF	Oday Al-Jafal	27 May 1990 (aged 17)		(Syria) Al-Futowa
15	FW	Alaa Al Shbli	3 May 1990 (aged 17)		(Syria) Al-Karamah
16	GK	Nour Assad	24 January 1990 (aged 17)		(Syria) Al-Jaish
17	MF	Solaiman Solaiman	6 May 1990 (aged 17)		(Syria) Al-Futowa
18	DF	Rajab Tubarakji	16 February 1990 (aged 17)		(Syria) Al-Ittihad
19	DF	Khaled Al Hurani	1 January 1990 (aged 17)		(Syria) Al-Horriya
20	FW	Hani Al Taiar	1 May 1990 (aged 17)		(Syria) Al-Karamah
21	GK	Akid Khalil	4 January 1990 (aged 17)		(Syria) Al-Jihad

== Group D ==
=== France ===
Head coach: (France) François Blaquart

No.	Pos.	Player	Date of birth (age)	Caps	Club
1	GK	Joris Delle	29 March 1990 (aged 17)		(France) Metz
2	DF	Frédéric Duplus	7 April 1990 (aged 17)		(France) Sochaux
3	DF	Romain Villard	9 January 1990 (aged 17)		(France) Grenoble
4	DF	Matthieu Saunier	7 February 1990 (aged 17)		(France) Bordeaux
5	DF	Mamadou Sakho	13 February 1990 (aged 17)		(France) Paris Saint-Germain
6	MF	Saïd Mehamha	4 September 1990 (aged 16)		(France) Lyon
7	MF	Yann M'Vila	29 June 1990 (aged 17)		(France) Rennes
8	MF	Martial Riff	22 February 1990 (aged 17)		(France) Sochaux
9	FW	Damien Le Tallec	19 April 1990 (aged 17)		(France) Rennes
10	FW	Thibault Bourgeois	5 January 1990 (aged 17)		(France) Metz
11	MF	Abdoul Camara	20 February 1990 (aged 17)		(France) Rennes
12	DF	Aristote Lusinga	20 February 1990 (aged 17)		(France) Nantes
13	DF	Badis Lebbihi	14 March 1990 (aged 17)		(France) Lille
14	DF	Mickaël Nelson	2 February 1990 (aged 17)		(France) Montpellier
15	FW	Vincent Acapandié	9 February 1990 (aged 17)		(France) Auxerre
16	GK	Abdoulaye Keita	19 August 1990 (aged 16)		(France) Bordeaux
17	MF	Alfred N'Diaye	6 March 1990 (aged 17)		(France) Nancy
18	FW	Hervé Bazile	18 March 1990 (aged 17)		(France) Guingamp
19	FW	Henri Saivet	26 October 1990 (aged 16)		(France) Bordeaux
20	FW	Emmanuel Rivière	3 March 1990 (aged 17)		(France) Saint-Etienne
21	GK	Samuel Atrous	15 February 1990 (aged 17)		(France) Lens

=== Haiti ===
Head coach: (Haiti) Jean Yves Labaze

No.	Pos.	Player	Date of birth (age)	Caps	Club
1	GK	Shelson Dorleans	15 October 1990 (aged 16)		(Haiti) AS Mirebalais
2	DF	Mechack Jérôme	21 April 1990 (aged 17)		(Haiti) Triomphe AC
3	DF	Gregory Ismael	9 May 1991 (aged 16)		(Haiti) Roulado
4	DF	Peterson Desriviere	17 October 1990 (aged 16)		(Haiti) AS Mirebalais
5	DF	Jeff Narcisse	3 March 1991 (aged 16)		(Haiti) AS Mirebalais
6	DF	Bitielo Jean Jacques	28 December 1990 (aged 16)		(Haiti) Victory SC
7	FW	Fabien Vorbe	4 January 1990 (aged 17)		(Haiti) Violette A.C.
8	MF	Widner Saint-Cyr	18 November 1990 (aged 16)		(Haiti) Victory SC
9	FW	Géraldy Joseph	28 May 1990 (aged 17)		(Haiti) Valencia
10	MF	Charles Hérold Jr.	23 July 1990 (aged 17)		(Haiti) Tempête
11	MF	Valdo Normil	19 December 1990 (aged 16)		(Haiti) AS Grand Goâve
12	FW	Gilberto Sylvain	17 August 1990 (aged 17)		(Haiti) Victory SC
13	FW	Herode Charles	12 September 1990 (aged 16)		(Haiti) Rangers FC
14	MF	Peterson Joseph	24 April 1990 (aged 17)		(Haiti) Aigle
15	MF	Wiselet Saint-Louis	10 September 1990 (aged 16)		(Haiti) AS Mirebalais
16	DF	Nikola Perou	24 April 1990 (aged 17)		(France) Alençon
17	MF	Joseph Guemsly Junior	3 January 1990 (aged 17)		(Haiti) Baltimore SC
18	FW	Mark Yves Luxama	23 May 1991 (aged 16)		(United States) Brooklyn Knights
19	MF	Yann Attié	8 January 1991 (aged 16)		(Haiti) Violette A.C.
20	GK	Ludovick Latortue	1 July 1990 (aged 17)		(Haiti) Violette A.C.
21	GK	William Richard Morse	18 December 1990 (aged 16)		(Haiti) Union School

=== Japan ===
Head coach: (Japan) Hiroshi Jofuku

No.	Pos.	Player	Date of birth (age)	Caps	Club
1	GK	Ryotaro Hironaga	9 January 1990 (aged 17)		(Japan) F.C. Tokyo
2	DF	Takashi Kanai	5 February 1990 (aged 17)		(Japan) Yokohama F. Marinos
3	DF	Daisuke Suzuki	29 January 1990 (aged 17)		(Japan) Seiryo High School
4	DF	Kimihiro Kai	16 May 1990 (aged 17)		(Japan) Yokohama F. Marinos
5	DF	Shunki Takahashi	4 May 1990 (aged 17)		(Japan) Urawa Red Diamonds
6	MF	Tomotaka Okamoto	29 June 1990 (aged 17)		(Japan) Sanfrecce Hiroshima
7	DF	Yutaka Yoshida	17 February 1990 (aged 17)		(Japan) Shizuoka Gakuen HS
8	MF	Yoichiro Kakitani	3 January 1990 (aged 17)		(Japan) Cerezo Osaka
9	MF	Kohei Hattanda	8 January 1990 (aged 17)		(Japan) Kagoshima Chuo High School
10	MF	Naoki Yamada	4 July 1990 (aged 17)		(Japan) Urawa Red Diamonds
11	FW	Kota Mizunuma	22 February 1990 (aged 17)		(Japan) Yokohama F. Marinos
12	MF	Tsukasa Masuyama	25 January 1990 (aged 17)		(Japan) Gifu Kogyo High School
13	MF	Takuji Yonemoto	3 December 1990 (aged 16)		(Japan) Itami High School
14	MF	Hiroki Kawano	30 March 1990 (aged 17)		(Japan) Tokyo Verdy
15	FW	Shohei Otsuka	11 April 1990 (aged 17)		(Japan) Gamba Osaka
16	MF	Manabu Saitō	4 April 1990 (aged 17)		(Japan) Yokohama F. Marinos
17	FW	Jin Hanato	31 May 1990 (aged 17)		(Japan) Yokohama F. Marinos
18	GK	Yutaro Hara	23 April 1990 (aged 17)		(Japan) Sanfrecce Hiroshima
19	MF	Hiroto Tanaka	26 April 1990 (aged 17)		(Japan) Gamba Osaka
20	DF	Ryo Okui	7 March 1990 (aged 17)		(Japan) Riseisha High School
21	GK	Satoshi Yoshida	10 February 1990 (aged 17)		(Japan) Luther Gakuin High School

=== Nigeria ===
Head coach: (Nigeria) Yemi Tella

No.	Pos.	Player	Date of birth (age)	Caps	Club
1	GK	Laide Okanlawon	31 December 1990 (aged 16)		(Nigeria) Crystal FC
2	FW	Ganiyu Oseni	19 September 1991 (aged 15)		(Nigeria) Prime
3	DF	Usman Amodu	16 December 1990 (aged 16)		(Nigeria) Abuja
4	DF	Azeez Balogun	10 December 1990 (aged 16)		(Benin) AS Porto Novo
5	DF	Kingsley Udoh	7 December 1990 (aged 16)		(Nigeria) Crystal FC
6	DF	Daniel Joshua	30 December 1990 (aged 16)		(Nigeria) Niger Tornadoes
7	FW	King Osanga	6 October 1990 (aged 16)		(Nigeria) Akwa United
8	FW	Kabiru Akinsola	21 January 1991 (aged 16)		Unattached
9	FW	Macauley Chrisantus	20 August 1990 (aged 16)		(Nigeria) Abuja
10	MF	Rabiu Ibrahim	15 March 1991 (aged 16)		(Nigeria) Gateway
11	DF	Matthew Edile	6 December 1990 (aged 16)		(Nigeria) Weekend Soccer Academy
12	GK	Dele Ajiboye	7 August 1990 (aged 17)		(Nigeria) Prime
13	FW	Yakubu Alfa	31 December 1990 (aged 16)		(Nigeria) Niger Tornadoes
14	MF	Abdulkarim Lukman	6 September 1990 (aged 16)		(Nigeria) Moderate Stars Academy
15	MF	Sheriff Isa	10 November 1990 (aged 16)		(Nigeria) Sultan Atiku Secondary School
16	MF	Mustapha Ibrahim	13 December 1990 (aged 16)		(Nigeria) Dan Amadu Academy
17	MF	Uremu Egbeta	15 November 1991 (aged 15)		Nigeria Port Authority
18	MF	Ademola Rafeal	4 November 1990 (aged 16)		(Nigeria) Westor Academy
19	MF	Saheed Fabiyi	23 December 1990 (aged 16)		(Nigeria) Sumal FC
20	MF	Lukman Haruna	4 December 1990 (aged 16)		(Nigeria) Moderate Stars Academy
21	GK	Uche Okafor	10 February 1991 (aged 16)		(Nigeria) Kaduna United

== Group E ==
=== Belgium ===
Head Coach: (Belgium) Bob Browaeys

No.	Pos.	Player	Date of birth (age)	Caps	Club
1	GK	Jo Coppens	21 December 1990 (aged 16)		(Belgium) Genk
2	DF	Dimitri Daeseleire	18 May 1990 (aged 17)		(Belgium) Genk
3	DF	Maxim Geurden	2 November 1990 (aged 16)		(Belgium) Genk
4	DF	Koen Hustinx	30 January 1990 (aged 17)		(Belgium) Genk
5	DF	Koen Weuts	18 September 1990 (aged 16)		(Belgium) Lierse
6	MF	Laurens Spruyt	5 January 1990 (aged 17)		(Belgium) Genk
7	FW	Guillaume François	3 June 1990 (aged 17)		(Belgium) Mouscron
8	MF	Sébastien Phiri	1 July 1990 (aged 17)		(Belgium) FC Brussels
9	FW	Nill De Pauw	6 January 1990 (aged 17)		(Belgium) Lokeren
10	FW	Eden Hazard	7 January 1991 (aged 16)		(France) Lille
11	DF	Kevin Kis	26 September 1990 (aged 16)		(Belgium) Genk
12	GK	Stefan Deloose	14 January 1990 (aged 17)		(Belgium) Lokeren
13	DF	Bryan Delvigne	30 January 1990 (aged 17)		(Belgium) Meux
14	DF	Rudy Ngombo	25 March 1990 (aged 17)		(Belgium) Standard Liège
15	DF	Cedric Guiro	6 April 1990 (aged 17)		(Belgium) Club Brugge
16	DF	Manuel de Castries	20 September 1990 (aged 16)		(Belgium) Standard Liège
17	MF	Kerem Zevne	16 January 1990 (aged 17)		(Belgium) Genk
18	FW	Maurizio Aquino	1 March 1990 (aged 17)		(Belgium) Genk
19	FW	Christian Benteke	3 December 1990 (aged 16)		(Belgium) Genk
20	FW	Jens Dyck	5 March 1990 (aged 17)		(Belgium) Club Brugge
21	GK	Nathan Goris	30 March 1990 (aged 17)		(Belgium) Lierse

=== Tajikistan ===
Head Coach: (Tajikistan) Pulod Kodirov

No.	Pos.	Player	Date of birth (age)	Caps	Club
1	GK	Farrukh Berdiev	14 May 1991 (aged 16)		(Tajikistan) Regar-TadAZ Tursunzoda
2	DF	Sheroz Abdulloev	12 April 1991 (aged 16)		(Tajikistan) Parvoz Bobojon Ghafurov
3	DF	Eraj Rajabov	9 November 1990 (aged 16)		(Tajikistan) Dynamo Dushanbe
4	DF	Romiz Bakhriddinov	1 December 1990 (aged 16)		(Tajikistan) Dynamo Dushanbe
5	DF	Farkhod Vosiyev	14 April 1990 (aged 17)		(Russia) Saturn Moscow
6	MF	Kurbonali Sobirov	17 December 1991 (aged 15)		(Tajikistan) Dynamo Dushanbe
7	MF	Buzurgmekhr Yusupov	11 January 1991 (aged 16)		(Tajikistan) Dynamo Dushanbe
8	FW	Manuchekhr Dzhalilov	27 September 1990 (aged 16)		(Russia) Lokomotiv Moscow
9	MF	Samad Shohzukhurov	8 February 1990 (aged 17)		(Tajikistan) Dynamo Dushanbe
10	FW	Davronjon Tukhtasunov	14 May 1990 (aged 17)		(Tajikistan) Dynamo Dushanbe
11	MF	Nuriddin Davronov	16 January 1991 (aged 16)		(Tajikistan) Energetik Dushanbe
12	FW	Abdukayum Karabaev	24 May 1990 (aged 17)		(Tajikistan) Vakhsh Qurghonteppa
13	FW	Shahzod Suleimonov	7 November 1992 (aged 14)		(Tajikistan) SKA-Pomir
14	FW	Farkhod Tokhirov	29 May 1990 (aged 17)		(Tajikistan) Parvoz Bobojon Ghafurov
15	DF	Furug Qodirov	10 February 1992 (aged 15)		(Tajikistan) Dynamo Dushanbe
16	GK	Mirali Murodov	20 April 1990 (aged 17)		(Tajikistan) Dynamo Dushanbe
17	MF	Umedzhon Sharipov	4 October 1992 (aged 14)		(Tajikistan) Vakhsh Qurghonteppa
18	MF	Fatkhullo Fatkhuloev	24 March 1990 (aged 17)		(Tajikistan) Dynamo Dushanbe
19	FW	Muzafar Fuzaylov	21 September 1990 (aged 16)		(Tajikistan) SKA-Pomir
20	DF	Isomiddin Qurbonov	12 September 1990 (aged 16)		(Tajikistan) Dynamo Dushanbe
21	GK	Bakhtovar Nusratulloev	8 June 1990 (aged 17)		(Tajikistan) Daler Gozimalik

=== Tunisia ===
Head coach: (Tunisia) Maher Kanzari

No.	Pos.	Player	Date of birth (age)	Caps	Club
1	GK	Habib Tounsi	6 February 1990 (aged 17)		(Tunisia) Espérance
2	DF	Mohamed Karoui	16 March 1990 (aged 17)		(Tunisia) Espérance
3	DF	Bilel Ifa	9 March 1990 (aged 17)		(Tunisia) Club Africain
4	DF	Hamza Tlili	28 January 1990 (aged 17)		(Tunisia) JS Kairouan
5	DF	Meher Jaballah	29 March 1990 (aged 17)		(Tunisia) Étoile du Sahel
6	MF	Mohamed Wazani	28 January 1990 (aged 17)		(Tunisia) Stade Tunisien
7	FW	Rafik Dkhil	1 February 1990 (aged 17)		(Tunisia) Espérance
8	MF	Ala Eddine Abbes	6 February 1990 (aged 17)		(Tunisia) Étoile du Sahel
9	FW	Mohamed Ben Azouz	3 September 1990 (aged 16)		(Tunisia) Espérance
10	MF	Nour Hadhria	4 September 1990 (aged 16)		(Tunisia) Club Africain
11	FW	Mossaâb Sassi	12 March 1990 (aged 17)		(Tunisia) Étoile du Sahel
12	MF	Sadok Arbi	14 January 1990 (aged 17)		(Tunisia) Espérance
13	FW	Khaled Ayari	17 January 1990 (aged 17)		(Tunisia) AS Ariana
14	DF	Slim Marzougui	4 May 1990 (aged 17)		(Tunisia) Club Africain
15	MF	Majdi Makhzoumi	5 February 1990 (aged 17)		(Tunisia) Club Africain
16	GK	Atef Dkhili	4 April 1990 (aged 17)		(Tunisia) Jendouba Sport
17	FW	Youssef Msakni	28 October 1990 (aged 16)		(Tunisia) Stade Tunisien
18	MF	Ahmed Mejri	12 July 1990 (aged 17)		(Tunisia) Espérance
19	DF	Saifeddine Ben Akremi	2 April 1990 (aged 17)		(Tunisia) Club Africain
20	MF	Oussama Boughanmi	5 January 1990 (aged 17)		(Tunisia) Stade Tunisien
21	GK	Mohamed Ali Souidi	11 May 1990 (aged 17)		(Tunisia) Club Africain

=== United States ===
Head Coach: (United States) John Hackworth

No.	Pos.	Player	Date of birth (age)	Caps	Club
1	GK	Josh Lambo	19 November 1990 (aged 16)		(United States) Chicago Magic
2	DF	Sheanon Williams	17 March 1990 (aged 17)		(United States) FC Greater Boston
3	DF	Mykell Bates	15 April 1990 (aged 17)		(United States) River City Clash
4	DF	Tommy Meyer	20 March 1990 (aged 17)		(United States) Scott Gallacher
5	DF	Chris Klute	5 March 1990 (aged 17)		(United States) Dallas Texans
6	MF	Daniel Wenzel	13 April 1990 (aged 17)		(United States) FC United
7	DF	Kofi Sarkodie	22 March 1991 (aged 16)		(United States) Ohio FC Mutiny
8	MF	Jared Jeffrey	14 June 1990 (aged 17)		(United States) Dallas Texans
9	FW	Ellis McLoughlin	8 July 1990 (aged 17)		(United States) Crossfire Premier
10	MF	Bryan Dominguez	7 March 1991 (aged 16)		(United States) Concorde Fire
11	FW	Fuad Ibrahim	15 August 1991 (aged 16)		(United States) FC Dallas
12	MF	Kirk Urso	6 March 1990 (aged 17)		(United States) Chicago Sockers
13	FW	Billy Schuler	27 April 1990 (aged 17)		(United States) Matchfit Academy
14	FW	Danny Cruz	3 January 1990 (aged 17)		(United States) Sereno Soccer Club
15	DF	Brek Shea	28 February 1990 (aged 17)		(United States) Texans FC
16	DF	Brandon Zimmerman	6 October 1990 (aged 16)		(United States) Crossfire Premier
17	MF	Greg Garza	16 August 1991 (aged 16)		(United States) Dallas Texans
18	GK	Zac MacMath	7 August 1991 (aged 16)		(United States) Clearwater Chargers
19	FW	Alex Nimo	21 March 1990 (aged 17)		(United States) FC Portland
20	GK	Larry Jackson	28 September 1990 (aged 16)		(United States) DeAnza Force
21	MF	Brendan King	25 February 1990 (aged 17)		(United States) Chicago Magic

== Group F ==
=== Colombia ===
Head coach: (Colombia) Eduardo Lara

No.	Pos.	Player	Date of birth (age)	Caps	Club
1	GK	Mauricio Acosta	22 February 1990 (aged 17)		(Colombia) Santa Fe
2	DF	Ricardo Chará	24 May 1990 (aged 17)		(Colombia) Centauros Villavicencio
3	DF	Eduard Zea	19 January 1990 (aged 17)		(Colombia) Deportes Quindío
4	MF	Charles Quinto	12 February 1990 (aged 17)		(Colombia) Envigado
5	DF	Sebastián Viáfara	2 April 1991 (aged 16)		(Colombia) Centauros Villavicencio
6	MF	Julián Guillermo	28 February 1990 (aged 17)		(Colombia) Academia
7	FW	Cristian Nazarit	13 August 1990 (aged 17)		(Colombia) América de Cali
8	MF	Ricardo Villarraga	23 April 1990 (aged 17)		(Colombia) Santa Fe
9	FW	Santiago Tréllez	17 January 1990 (aged 17)		(Colombia) Independiente Medellín
10	MF	James Rodríguez	12 July 1991 (aged 16)		(Colombia) Envigado
11	MF	Oneíder Álvarez	8 September 1990 (aged 16)		(Colombia) Cortuluá
12	GK	Andrés Mosquera	10 September 1991 (aged 15)		(Colombia) Santa Fe Bogotá
13	DF	Carlos Ramos	11 February 1990 (aged 17)		(Colombia) Envigado
14	MF	Junior Romero	18 February 1990 (aged 17)		(Colombia) Unión Magdalena
15	MF	Ricardo Serna	26 January 1990 (aged 17)		(Colombia) Deportivo Cali
16	MF	Miguel Julio	21 February 1991 (aged 16)		(Colombia) Independiente Medellín
17	DF	Andrés Mosquera Guardia	20 February 1990 (aged 17)		(Colombia) Independiente Medellín
18	DF	José Ramírez	18 September 1990 (aged 16)		(Colombia) Envigado
19	FW	Raúl Asprilla	12 December 1991 (aged 15)		(Colombia) Chicó
20	FW	Felipe Pardo	17 August 1990 (aged 17)		(Colombia) Deportivo Cali
21	GK	Jaiber Cardona	19 January 1990 (aged 17)		(Colombia) Escuela Carlos Sarmiento

=== Germany ===
Head coach: (Germany) Heiko Herrlich

No.	Pos.	Player	Date of birth (age)	Caps	Club
1	GK	Fabian Giefer	17 May 1990 (aged 17)		(Germany) Bayer Leverkusen
2	DF	Kai-Bastian Evers	5 May 1990 (aged 17)		(Germany) Borussia Dortmund
3	DF	Jonas Strifler	30 January 1990 (aged 17)		(Germany) 1899 Hoffenheim
4	DF	Nils Teixeira	10 July 1990 (aged 17)		(Germany) Bayer Leverkusen
5	MF	Konstantin Rausch	15 March 1990 (aged 17)		(Germany) Hannover 96
6	MF	Kevin Wolze	9 March 1990 (aged 17)		(England) Bolton Wanderers
7	FW	Henning Sauerbier	6 January 1990 (aged 17)		(Germany) Bayer Leverkusen
8	MF	Patrick Funk	11 February 1990 (aged 17)		(Germany) VfB Stuttgart
9	FW	Richard Sukuta-Pasu	24 June 1990 (aged 17)		(Germany) Bayer Leverkusen
10	MF	Toni Kroos	4 January 1990 (aged 17)		(Germany) Bayern Munich
11	FW	Dennis Dowidat	10 January 1990 (aged 17)		(Germany) Borussia Mönchengladbach
12	GK	René Vollath	20 March 1990 (aged 17)		(Germany) 1. FC Nürnberg
13	MF	Mehmet Ekici	25 March 1990 (aged 17)		(Germany) Bayern Munich
14	DF	Matthias Haas	17 April 1990 (aged 17)		(Germany) Bayern Munich
15	MF	Tony Jantschke	7 April 1990 (aged 17)		(Germany) Borussia Mönchengladbach
16	MF	Sebastian Rudy	28 February 1990 (aged 17)		(Germany) VfB Stuttgart
17	FW	Alexander Esswein	25 March 1990 (aged 17)		(Germany) 1. FC Kaiserslautern
18	DF	Mario Erb	16 June 1990 (aged 17)		(Germany) Bayern Munich
19	FW	Fabian Broghammer	14 January 1990 (aged 17)		(Germany) 1899 Hoffenheim
20	MF	Sascha Bigalke	8 January 1990 (aged 17)		(Germany) Hertha BSC
21	GK	Kevin Trapp	8 July 1990 (aged 17)		(Germany) 1. FC Kaiserslautern

=== Ghana ===
Head coach: (Ghana) Sellas Tetteh

No.	Pos.	Player	Date of birth (age)	Caps	Club
1	GK	Joseph Addo	2 November 1990 (aged 16)		(Ghana) Hasaacas
2	FW	Abdulai Seidu	8 September 1992 (aged 14)		(Ghana) Samreka
3	DF	Paul Addo	14 June 1990 (aged 17)		(Ghana) Fair Point
4	DF	Daniel Opare	18 October 1990 (aged 16)		(Ghana) Ashanti Gold SC
5	MF	Francis Boadi	23 November 1991 (aged 15)		(Ghana) Great Olympics
6	DF	Tetteh Nortey	7 July 1990 (aged 17)		(Ghana) African United
7	FW	Abeiku Quansah	1 October 1990 (aged 16)		(Ghana) Windy Professionals
8	MF	Enoch Kofi Adu	14 September 1990 (aged 16)		(Ghana) Liberty Professionals
9	FW	Sadick Adams	1 January 1990 (aged 17)		(Ghana) Ashanti Gold SC
10	FW	Ransford Osei	5 December 1990 (aged 16)		(Ghana) Kessben F.C.
11	FW	Ishmael Yartey	11 January 1990 (aged 17)		(Ghana) All Blacks
12	DF	Philip Boampong	1 January 1990 (aged 17)		(Ghana) Maxbees
13	DF	Meisuna Alhassan	16 May 1990 (aged 17)		(Ghana) Eleven Wise
14	FW	Isaac Donkor	16 November 1991 (aged 15)		(Ghana) Hasaacas
15	DF	Eric Opoku	11 November 1991 (aged 15)		(Ghana) Corners Babies
16	GK	Baba Sampana	14 December 1991 (aged 15)		(Ghana) Shelter Force
17	MF	Richard Mpong	4 July 1990 (aged 17)		(Ghana) All Blacks
18	FW	Kelvin Bossman	20 January 1991 (aged 16)		(England) Reading
19	MF	Abdul Naza Alhassan	17 June 1990 (aged 17)		(Ghana) Maxbees
20	FW	Prince Gyimah	25 December 1990 (aged 16)		(Ghana) Arsenal
21	GK	Robert Dabuo	10 November 1990 (aged 16)		(Ghana) Wa All Stars

=== Trinidad and Tobago ===
Head coach: (Trinidad and Tobago) Anton Corneal

No.	Pos.	Player	Date of birth (age)	Caps	Club
1	GK	Jesse Fullerton	20 October 1990 (aged 16)		(United States) Weston Fury
2	DF	Aubrey David	11 October 1990 (aged 16)		(Trinidad and Tobago) W Connection
3	DF	Ryan O'Neil	11 March 1990 (aged 17)		(Trinidad and Tobago) Defence Force
4	DF	Sheldon Bateau	29 January 1991 (aged 16)		(Trinidad and Tobago) San Juan Jabloteh
5	DF	Akeem Adams	13 April 1991 (aged 16)		(Trinidad and Tobago) W Connection
6	MF	Leston Paul	11 March 1990 (aged 17)		(Trinidad and Tobago) Defence Force
7	DF	Brenton Balbosa	9 May 1990 (aged 17)		(Trinidad and Tobago) Defence Force
8	MF	Sean de Silva	17 January 1990 (aged 17)		(Trinidad and Tobago) St. Ann's Rangers
9	DF	Aaron Maund	19 September 1990 (aged 16)		(United States) FC Greater Boston
10	FW	Stephen Knox	3 September 1990 (aged 16)		(Trinidad and Tobago) San Juan Jabloteh
11	FW	Daniel Joseph	28 July 1990 (aged 17)		(Trinidad and Tobago) San Juan Jabloteh
12	DF	Robert Primus	10 November 1990 (aged 16)		(Trinidad and Tobago) San Juan Jabloteh
13	MF	Stephan Campbell	26 August 1990 (aged 16)		(Trinidad and Tobago) United Petrotrin
14	DF	Jean Luc Rochford	10 November 1990 (aged 16)		(Trinidad and Tobago) Joe Public
15	MF	Chike Sullivan	16 October 1991 (aged 15)		(Trinidad and Tobago) San Juan Jabloteh
16	FW	Marcus Joseph	29 April 1991 (aged 16)		(Trinidad and Tobago) United Petrotrin
17	DF	Daneil Cyrus	15 December 1990 (aged 16)		(Trinidad and Tobago) Stokely Vale
18	MF	Micah Lewis	20 March 1990 (aged 17)		(Trinidad and Tobago) San Juan Jabloteh
19	MF	Kevin Molino	17 June 1990 (aged 17)		(Trinidad and Tobago) San Juan Jabloteh
20	GK	Kern Caesar	13 January 1991 (aged 16)		(United States) Victory Christian Academy
21	GK	Glenroy Samuel	5 April 1990 (aged 17)		(Trinidad and Tobago) San Juan Jabloteh
