= 2006 AFC U-17 Championship =

Tournament details
- Host country: Singapore
- Dates: 3–17 September
- Teams: 15 (from 1 confederation)
- Venue: 2 (in 1 host city)

Final positions
- Champions: Japan (2nd title)
- Runners-up: North Korea
- Third place: Tajikistan
- Fourth place: Syria

Tournament statistics
- Matches played: 29
- Goals scored: 98 (3.38 per match)
- Top scorer: (Syria) Mohamad Jaafar (6 goals)
- Best player: (Japan) Yoichiro Kakitani

The 2006 AFC U-17 Championship was the 12th competition of the AFC U-17 Championship organized by the Asian Football Confederation (AFC), which was held between 3 and 17 September 2006 in Singapore. Japan won their second title with a 4–2 win against Korea DPR in the final.

== Qualification Competition ==
Laos won Group I of the qualifying round and was placed in Group C of the finals, but was disqualified after an investigation by the Asian Football Confederation's disciplinary committee found that the team fielded an over-aged player in the AFC U-13 football tournament in Laos in April 2005. Australia, which finished behind Laos in the qualification, declined to take the slot: therefore, only fifteen teams competed in the final tournament.

- Bangladesh
- China
- Iran
- Iraq
- Japan
- South Korea
- Saudi Arabia
- North Korea
- Myanmar
- Nepal
- Singapore (host)
- Syria
- Tajikistan
- Vietnam
- Yemen

== Stadiums ==
Singapore
Jalan Besar Stadium	Bishan Stadium
Capacity: 6,000	Capacity: 3,500

== Group stage ==
All times are Singapore Standard Time (UTC+8)

=== Group A ===
Team	Pts	Pld	W	D	L	GF	GA	GD
Japan	7	3	2	1	0	10	3	+7
South Korea	6	3	2	0	1	7	4	+3
Singapore	2	3	0	2	1	2	4	-2
Nepal	1	3	0	1	2	0	8	-8

3 September 2006
17:00

South Korea	3–1	Singapore
Choi Jin-soo 35'; Kim Jung-Hyun 66'; Gu Ja-Myeong 88'		Quak 56'

Jalan Besar Stadium
Attendance: 1,500
3 September 2006
20:00

Japan	6–0	Nepal
Yamada 8'; Okamoto 13'; Hanato 69', 77'; Mizunuma 80', 90+1'

Jalan Besar Stadium
Attendance: 1,800

5 September 2006
17:00

Singapore	1–1	Japan
Izzdin 86' (pen.)		Kakitani 81'

Jalan Besar Stadium
Attendance: 1,500
5 September 2006
20:00

South Korea	2–0	Nepal
Seol Jae-Mun 45'; Joo Sung-Hwan 81'

Jalan Besar Stadium
Attendance: 2,277

7 September 2006
17:00

Japan	3–2	South Korea
Mizunuma 19', 90'; Otsuka 67'		Joo Sung-Hwan 59', 74'

Jalan Besar Stadium
Attendance: 2,348
7 September 2006
17:00

Singapore	0–0	Nepal

Bishan Stadium
Attendance: 2,000

=== Group B ===
Team	Pts	Pld	W	D	L	GF	GA	GD
Tajikistan	9	3	3	0	0	7	4	+3
Iran	4	3	1	1	1	2	2	0
Iraq	2	3	0	2	1	1	2	-1
Yemen	1	3	0	1	2	4	6	-2

3 September 2006
17:00

Iran	1–0	Yemen
Alimohammadi 32'

Bishan Stadium
Attendance: 100
3 September 2006
20:00

Iraq	0–1	Tajikistan
		Karabaev 90+3'

Bishan Stadium
Attendance: 50

5 September 2006
17:00

Yemen	1–1	Iraq
Al-Ameri 81'		Mohammed 22'

Bishan Stadium
Attendance: 50
5 September 2006
20:00

Tajikistan	2–1	Iran
Tukhtasunov 13', 23'		Daghagheleh 75'

Bishan Stadium

7 September 2006
20:00

Iran	0–0	Iraq

Jalan Besar Stadium
Attendance: 1,257
7 September 2006
20:00

Yemen	3–4	Tajikistan
Al-Ameri 41', 90+2'; Omar 45+1'		Tokhirov 51'; Tukhtasunov 55', 82'; Vasiev 67'

Bishan Stadium
Attendance: 400

=== Group C ===
Team	Pts	Pld	W	D	L	GF	GA	GD
Saudi Arabia	6	2	2	0	0	7	1	+6
North Korea	3	2	1	0	1	7	4	+3
Myanmar	0	2	0	0	2	2	11	-9

4 September 2006
17:00

North Korea	1–2	Saudi Arabia
An Il-Bom 43'		Al-Dossari 46'; Fallatah 58'

Jalan Besar Stadium
Attendance: 1,511

6 September 2006
20:00

Myanmar	2–6	North Korea
Kyaw Ko Ko 48'; Kyaing Aung Pyone 74'		Ri Myong-Jun 11', 36'; Ri Sang-Chol 45+2', 55'; O Jin-hyok 60', 61'

Jalan Besar Stadium
Attendance: 3,658

8 September 2006
17:00

Saudi Arabia	5–0	Myanmar
Al-Dossari 8'; Hazazi 29', 37'; Al-Matrafi 33'; Al-Shamari 82'

Bishan Stadium
Attendance: 1,500

=== Group D ===
Team	Pts	Pld	W	D	L	GF	GA	GD
China	7	3	2	1	0	9	3	+6
Syria	6	3	2	0	1	9	1	+8
Vietnam	4	3	1	1	1	5	5	0
Bangladesh	0	3	0	0	3	0	14	-14

4 September 2006
17:00

China	1–0	Syria
Wang Yongxin 89'

Bishan Stadium
Attendance: 100
4 September 2006
20:00

Bangladesh	0–2	Vietnam
		Trần Việt Trung 55'; Hoàng Danh Ngọc 72' (pen.)

Bishan Stadium
Attendance: 300

6 September 2006
17:00

Syria	7–0	Bangladesh
Jaafar 8', 61' (pen.); Mido 10', 15', 56'; Solaiman 12'; Ajouz 42'

Bishan Stadium
Attendance: 100
6 September 2006
20:00

Vietnam	3–3	China
Trần Việt Trung 29'; Đào Ngọc Phước 31'; Nguyễn Văn Trung 73'		Wang Yunlong 64' (pen.), 79'; Ma Long 90'

Bishan Stadium

8 September 2006
20:00

China	5–0	Bangladesh
Ma Long 27', 81'; Gao Di 42', 45'; Li Haifang 76'

Jalan Besar Stadium
Attendance: 2,402
8 September 2006
20:00

Syria	2–0	Vietnam
Mido 80'; Ajouz 83'

Bishan Stadium
Attendance: 1,000

== Knockout stage ==
All times are Singapore Standard Time (UTC+8)

=== Bracket ===
Quarter-finals
11 September
Japan (p)	1 (8)
Iran	1 (7)
11 September
Saudi Arabia	1
Syria	2
11 September
Tajikistan	1
South Korea	0
11 September
China	1
North Korea	2

Semi-finals
14 September
Japan	2
Syria	0
14 September
Tajikistan	0
North Korea	3

Final
17 September
Japan (a.e.t.)	4
North Korea	2
Third place
17 September
Syria	3 (4)
Tajikistan (p)	3 (5)

=== Quarterfinal ===
11 September 2006
17:00

Japan	1–1 (a.e.t.)	Iran
Kakitani 14'		Alimohammadi 73'
Penalties
Mizunuma (penalty scored); Tanaka (penalty scored); Hironaga (penalty scored); Higa (penalty missed); Kai (penalty scored); Yamazaki (penalty missed); Kanai (penalty missed); Okamoto (penalty scored); Yamada (penalty missed); Kakitani (penalty scored); Mizunuma (penalty scored); Tanaka (penalty scored)	8–7	(penalty scored) Alimohammadi; (penalty scored) Ehsan Hajysafi; (penalty scored) Seyed Amiri; (penalty missed) Shahryar Shirvand; (penalty scored) Mehdi Daghagheleh; (penalty missed) Hamidreza Aliasgari; (penalty missed) Karim Ansari; (penalty scored) Arash Gholizadeh; (penalty missed) Bakhtiar Rahmani; (penalty scored) Noushi Sofiani; (penalty scored) Alimohammadi; (penalty missed) Ehsan Hajysafi

Jalan Besar Stadium
Attendance: 300

11 September 2006
20:00

Tajikistan	1–0	South Korea
Vasiev 81'

Jalan Besar Stadium
Attendance: 2,346

11 September 2006
17:00

Saudi Arabia	1–2	Syria
Fahad Al-Dossari 46'		Mohamad Jaafar 9', 74'

Bishan Stadium
Attendance: 50

11 September 2006
20:00

China	1–2 (a.e.t.)	North Korea
Gao Di 16'		Ri Myong-Jun 20'; O Jin-hyok 110'

Bishan Stadium
Attendance: 300

=== Semi-finals ===
14 September 2006
17:00

Japan	2–0	Syria
Saito 69'; Kakitani 79'

Jalan Besar Stadium
Attendance: 500

14 September 2006
20:00

Tajikistan	0–3	North Korea
		An Il-Bom 26', 53'; Ri Sang-Chol 38'

Jalan Besar Stadium
Attendance: 2,654

=== Third place playoff ===
17 September 2006
17:00

Syria	3–3 (a.e.t.)	Tajikistan
Mohamad Jaafar 45+1', 94'; Solaiman Solaiman 50' (pen.)		Fatkhuloev 29'; Sobirov 67'; Karabaev 114'
Penalties
	4–5

Jalan Besar Stadium
Attendance: 300

=== Final ===
17 September 2006
20:00

Japan	4–2 (a.e.t.)	North Korea
Kakitani 57'; Hanato 78'; Kawano 113', 120'		O Jin-hyok 7'; Ri Sang-Chol 25'

Jalan Besar Stadium
Attendance: 3,346

== Winners ==
2006 AFC U-17 Championship

Japan
Second title

== Awards ==
Most Valuable Player	Top Scorer	Fair Play Award
(Japan) Yoichiro Kakitani	(Syria) Mohamad Jaafar (6 goals)	Japan

== Countries to participate in 2007 FIFA U-17 World Cup ==
- Japan
- North Korea
- Syria
- Tajikistan
- South Korea (host nation)

== Goalscorers ==
There were 98 goals scored in 29 matches, for an average of 3.38 goals per match.

6 goals

- (Syria) Mohamad Jaafar

4 goals

- (Japan) Kota Mizunuma
- (Japan) Yoichiro Kakitani
- (North Korea) O Jin-hyok
- (North Korea) Ri Sang-Chol
- (Syria) Mohamad Mido
- (Tajikistan) Davronjon Tukhtasunov

3 goals

- (China) Gao Di
- (China) Ma Long
- (Japan) Jin Hanato
- (South Korea) Joo Sung-Hwan
- (Saudi Arabia) Fahad Al-Dossari
- (North Korea) An Il-Bom
- (North Korea) Ri Myong-Jun
- (Yemen) Muaadh Al-Ameri

2 goals

- (China) Wang Yunlong
- (Iran) Jalalaldin Alimohammadi
- (Japan) Hiroki Kawano
- (Saudi Arabia) Mohammed Hazazi
- (Syria) Solaiman Solaiman
- (Syria) Ziad Ajouz
- (Tajikistan) Abdukayum Karabaev
- (Tajikistan) Farkhod Vasiev
- (Vietnam) Trần Việt Trung

1 goal

- (China) Li Haifang
- (China) Wang Yongxin
- (Iran) Mehdi Daghagheleh
- (Iraq) Emar Mohammed
- (Japan) Manabu Saito
- (Japan) Naoki Yamada
- (Japan) Shohei Otsuka
- (Japan) Tomotaka Okamoto
- (South Korea) Choi Jin-soo
- (South Korea) Gu Ja-Myeong
- (South Korea) Kim Jung-Hyun
- (South Korea) Seol Jae-Mun
- (Saudi Arabia) Abdulaziz Al-Shamari
- (Saudi Arabia) Raqi Fallatah
- (Saudi Arabia) Thenyan Al-Matrafi
- (Myanmar) Ko Kyaw Ko
- (Myanmar) Kyaing Aung Pyone
- (Singapore) Izzdin Shafiq
- (Singapore) Gabriel Quak
- (Tajikistan) Fatkhullo Fatkhuloev
- (Tajikistan) Farkhod Tokhirov
- (Tajikistan) Kurbonali Sobirov
- (Vietnam) Đào Ngọc Phước
- (Vietnam) Hoàng Danh Ngọc
- (Vietnam) Nguyễn Văn Trung
- (Yemen) Abdullah Omar
