= Segbefia =

Segbefia is a surname. Notable people with the surname include:

- Alex Segbefia (born 1963), Ghanaian lawyer and politician
- Alikem Segbefia (born 1990), Togolese footballer
- Fredrick Percival Segbefia (born 1931), Ghanaian politician
- Prince Segbefia (born 1991), Togolese footballer
