= Quinto (name) =

Quinto is a surname and a masculine name of Italian origin. Notable people with the name include:

== Surname ==
- Angeline Quinto (born 1989), Filipino actress
- Angelo Quinto (1990–2020), Asian-American man killed by police
- Bong Quinto (born 1994), Filipino basketball player
- Charles Quinto (born 1990), Chilean footballer
- Egidio Quinto (1653–1722), Archbishop of Antivari
- Felice Quinto (1929–2010), Italian photographer
- Raúl Quinto (born 1978), Spanish poet
- Rufa Mae Quinto (born 1978), Filipino actress
- Ruthie Quinto (born 1968), American educator
- William Quinto (born 1937), Belizean diplomat
- Zachary Quinto (born 1977), American actor

== Given name ==
- Quinto Maganini (1897–1974), American composer, flautist, and conductor
- Quinto Martini (artist) (1908–1990), Italian artist and writer
- Quinto Martini (politician) (1908–1975), Canadian politician
- Quinto Quintieri (1894–1968), Italian banker and politician
- Quinto Vadi (1921–2014), Italian gymnast

== See also ==
- Quinto (disambiguation), related disambiguation page
