= Goris (disambiguation) =

Goris is a town in southern Armenia.

Goris may also refer to:

== People ==
- Diego Goris (born 1990), Dominican baseball player
- Esther Goris (born 1960), Argentine actress
- Jesús Gorís, founder of Cuban record company Puchito Records
- Marnix Gijsen (1899–1984), Belgian writer (born Joannes Alphonsius Albertus Goris)
- Nathan Goris (born 1990), Belgian footballer
- René Goris (born 1946), Belgian long-distance runner
- Rob Goris (1982–2012), Belgian road-racing cyclist

== Other uses ==
- Goriš, a village near Šibenik, Croatia
