= Víctor Ulloa =

Víctor Ulloa may refer to:

- Víctor Ulloa (footballer, born 1992), Mexican-American soccer midfielder
- Víctor Ulloa (Peruvian footballer) (born 1991), football goalkeeper who plays for Carlos Mannucci
