= Alex Kinvi-Boh =

Togolese footballer

Personal information
- Full name: Alexander Kinvi-Boh
- Date of birth: December 20, 1991 (age 34)
- Place of birth: Masséda, Togo
- Height: 1.76 m (5 ft 9 1/2 in)
- Positions: Central defender; right full back

Team information
- Current team: US Masséda
- Number: 3

Youth career
- –2003: Dallas FC
- 2004–2007: Guepards FC

Senior career*
Years	Team	Apps	(Gls)
2007–	US Masséda		

International career
2007–2008	Togo U-17	13	(1)
2008–	Togo	18	(0)
- * Club domestic league appearances and goals

Alexander Kinvi-Boh (born December 20, 1991) is a Togolese footballer. He currently plays for US Masséda.

== Career ==
He started football at his early ages Dallas FC (regional) and Guepards FC (National level). He started at the age of 13 at the position of defensive midfielder before playing as central defender and right full back in the late 2 years. 2004-2005 was voted the best young defender National division 2 league with Guepards FC. He was a member of the 2005-2006 Champions of National division 2 league with USM. Kinvi-Boh started in summer 2007 with the first team of US Masséda his professional career and played alongtime with Backer Aloenouvo. This victory earned the club a Promotion from division/league 2 to league 1 (top league). Played African Confederation Cup with USM (2008) after being 2nd in Togo Division 1 league. They were kicked out of the CAF confederation at the 1/8 stage of the championship in 2008. A member of the Winning team of the Togolese National U-17 Inter-league Cup. After the CAF Orange Confederations Cup, he has been in top shape at the peak of football and uis the current captain of his team USM.

== International ==
Kinvi-Boh played with the U-17 from Togo at 2007 FIFA U-17 World Cup in South Korea. Since 2008 Alex is member of the Togolese first national team. In 2006-2007 he earned his first National medal for placing second in the African U-17 Caf Tournament (hosted in Togo.) 2007 - Winners of Togo Independence Cup with USM. Played U-17 World Cup in SOUTH KOREA (part of starting 11). Award the best Togolese player at U-17 World Cup in Korea as a defender. He is a member of the 2010 African Cup of Nations team for Togo, in Angola 2010.
