= Eric Opoku =

Eric Opoku may refer to:

- Eric Opoku (footballer) (born 1991), Ghanaian footballer
- Eric Opoku (politician) (born 1970), Ghanaian politician
