= Amodu =

Amodu is both a given name and a surname. Notable people with the name include:

- Amodu Tijani Oluwa, Nigerian chief
- Shuaibu Amodu (1958–2016), Nigerian footballer
- Usman Amodu (born 1990), Nigerian footballer
- Yemi Amodu (born 1968), Nigerian actor
