= Boadi (surname) =

Boadi is a surname. Notable people with the surname include:

- Akwasi Boadi (born 1962), Ghanaian entertainer also known as Akrobeto
- Francis Boadi (born 1991), Ghanaian footballer
- Anthony Bright Boadi-Mensah, Ghanaian politician
- Emmanuel Gyimah-Boadi (born 1953), Ghanaian political scientist
