= Ruthie =

Ruthie is a feminine diminutive of Ruth. Notable people with the name include:

- Ruthie the Duck Girl (1934–2008), American woman
- Ruthie Bolton (born 1967), American basketball player
- Ruthie Blum, Israeli journalist
- Ruthie Collins (born 1984), American singer-songwriter
- Ruthie Davis, American designer and entrepreneur
- Ruthie Foster (born 1964), American singer-songwriter
- Ruthie Gilor, Israeli lawn bowler
- Ruthie Henshall (born 1967), English actress and singer
- Ruthie Matthes (born 1965), American bicycler and racer
- Ruthie Ann Miles (born 1983), American actress and singer
- Ruthie Morris (born 1964), American musician and guitarist
- Ruthie Quinto (born 1968), American educator
- Ruthie Tompson (1910–2021), American engineer and animator

== Other uses ==
- Château de Ruthie, castle in the commune of Aussurucq in the Pyrénées-Atlantiques département of France
- Ruthie Berman and Connie Kurtz,
- Ruthie on the Telephone, a series aired on the CBS Television network during 1949
- "Ruthie" (BoJack Horseman)
