= Tounde Adekounle =

Togolese footballer (born 1988)

Personal information
- Full name: Tounde Adekounle
- Date of birth: December 20, 1988 (age 37)
- Place of birth: Masséda, Togo
- Height: 1.67 m (5 ft 5 1/2 in)
- Position: Striker

Team information
- Current team: US Masseda
- Number: 20

Youth career
- –2005: US Masseda

Senior career*
| Years | Team | Apps | (Gls) |
| 2005– | US Masseda | 99 | (0) |
| 2008–2009 | → Liberty Pro (loan) | 26 | (12) |

International career^{‡}
| 2004–2006 | Togo U-17 | 9 | (1) |
| 2007 | Togo | 1 | (0) |
- * Club domestic league appearances and goals ‡ National team caps and goals as of 10:08, 19 June 2022 (UTC)

Tounde Adekounle (born December 20, 1988, in Masséda) is a Togolese footballer, who currently plays for US Masseda, having also represented Togo internationally.

== Career ==
Adekounle began his career in the youth from US Masseda and played with the team at CAF Confederation Cup 2008. He left US Masseda on November 5, 2008, to join Ghanaian club Liberty Professionals F.C. on loan.
