= Qodirov =

Qodirov is a surname. Notable people with the surname include:

- Alisher Qodirov (born 1975), Uzbek politician
- Furug Qodirov (born 1992), Tajikistani footballer
- Ulugʻbek Qodirov (born 1983), Uzbek actor
