= Backer Aloenouvo =

Togolese footballer

Personal information
- Date of birth: July 4, 1990 (age 36)
- Place of birth: Masséda, Togo
- Height: 1.67 m (5 ft 5 1/2 in)
- Position: Striker

Team information
- Current team: Arabia Tabligbo
- Number: 9

Youth career
- –2007: Masséda

Senior career*
Years	Team	Apps	(Gls)
2007–2008	Masséda		
2008–2012	AS Marsa	49	(0)
2012	Hammam-Sousse	18	(4)
2012–2014	Stade Gabèsien	7	(0)
2014–2015	Al-Karkh		(3)
2015	Al-Shorta		(0)
2015–17	Al-Karkh		(3)
2017–18	Dynamic Togolais		
2018–19	Arabia Tabligbo		

International career^{‡}
2007–2008	Togo U-17	8	(3)
2010–	Togo	14	(4)
- * Club domestic league appearances and goals ‡ National team caps and goals as of 8 September 2013

Backer Aloenouvo (born July 4, 1990, in Masséda) is a Togolese footballer, who currently plays for Togo club Arabia Tabligbo.

== Career ==
Aloenouvo began his career in the youth from US Masséda, was in Summer 2007 promoted to the first team. He played at the 2008 CAF Confederations Cup against the Beninese side UNB.

On July 1, 2008, he joined to Tunisian club AS Marsa.

== International career ==
Backer played with the U-17 from Togo at 2007 FIFA U-17 World Cup in South Korea. He made his debut for the Senior Side on July 1, 2010, against Chad in which he scored. He also scored in a match against Malawi.

=== International goals ===
#	Date	Venue	Opponent	Score	Result	Competition
1	1 July 2010	Stade Omnisports Idriss Mahamat Ouya, N'Djamena	Chad	2–2	2–2	2012 African Cup of Nations qualifier
2	9 July 2010	Stade de Kégué, Lomé	Malawi	1–1	1–1	2012 African Cup of Nations qualifier
3	10 August 2011	Stade Général Seyni Kountché, Niamey	Niger	3–0	3–3	Friendly match
4	10 September 2013	Stade de Kégué, Lomé, Togo	DR Congo	2–1	2–1	2014 World Cup qualifier
