= Quinto =

Quinto may refer to:

== People ==
- Quinto (name), list of people with the name

== Places ==
- Quinto (Ponce), a barrio in Puerto Rico
- Quinto, Aragon, a municipality in the province of Zaragoza, Spain
- Quinto, Ticino, a municipality in Switzerland
- In Italy:
  - Quinto Vercellese, Province of Vercelli, Piedmont
  - Quinto Vicentino, Province of Vicenza, Veneto
  - Quinto di Treviso, Province of Treviso, Veneto
- Quinto River, in Argentina
- Pio Quinto, desert in Nicaragua

== Other uses ==
- Quinto (drum), the smallest of the conga drums used in the music of Cuba
- Quinto, a five-digit numbers game offered by the Pennsylvania Lottery, in the United States
- Quinto, a 1960s 3M bookshelf game
