= Uche Okafor (footballer, born 1991) =

Nigerian footballer

Personal information
- Full name: Uche Okafor
- Date of birth: 10 February 1991 (age 35)
- Place of birth: Nigeria
- Height: 1.80 m (5 ft 11 in)
- Position: Goalkeeper

Team information
- Current team: Enugu Rangers
- Number: 16

Senior career*
Years	Team	Apps	(Gls)
2007–2010	Kaduna United F.C.		
2010–	Enugu Rangers		

International career
2007	Nigeria U-17	1	(0)
2009	Nigeria U-20	4	(0)
- * Club domestic league appearances and goals

Uche Okafor (born 10 February 1991) is a Nigerian football goalkeeper currently playing for Enugu Rangers.

== International career ==
Okafor represented Nigeria national under-17 football team at the 2007 U-17 World Cup in South Korea and played one game on the world championship team. He represented the Flying Eagles at 2009 African Youth Championship in Rwanda at the 2009 U-20 World Cup.

== Titles ==
- 2007 FIFA U-17 World Cup - Winner
