= Abd Al Naser Hasan =

Syrian footballer (born 1990)

Abd Al Naser Hasan عبد الناصر حسن
Personal information
- Full name: Abdel Nasser Jamal Hasan
- Date of birth: 28 October 1990 (age 35)
- Place of birth: Qamishli, Syria
- Height: 1.83 m (6 ft 0 in)
- Position: Centre back

Youth career
- Al-Jehad

Senior career*
Years	Team	Apps	(Gls)
2006–2008	Al Jehad		
2008–2010	Al-Wahda		
2010–2013	Al-Shorta		
2013–2014	Al-Nejmeh	17	(0)
2014–2015	Dohuk	8	(0)
2015	Naft Al-Janoob		
2016-2017	Al Jaish Dimashq		
2017-2018	Al-Ittihad Aleppo		
2018-2019	→ Sohar SC (loan)		
2020	Al-Jaish Dimashq		
2021-2023	Al-Fotuwa SC		

International career^{‡}
2005–2007	Syria U-17		
2007–2009	Syria U-20		
2008–2012	Syria U-23		
2008–2014	Syria	12	(0)
- * Club domestic league appearances and goals as of 29 March 2009 ‡ National team caps and goals as of 15 November 2014

Abd Al Naser Hasan is a retired Syrian footballer.

== Career ==
The midfielder played in his career abroad, in Iraq for Naft Al-Janoob and Dohuk FC, Omani club Sohar SC and in Lebanon for Nejmeh SC.
