= Malick Korodowou =

Togolese footballer

Personal information
- Full name: Abdou-Malick Korodowou
- Date of birth: 15 December 1990 (age 35)
- Place of birth: Lomé, Togo
- Height: 1.77 m (5 ft 10 in)
- Position: Defensive midfielder

Youth career
- 2005–2007: Planète Foot
- 2007–2010: Cannes

Senior career*
Years	Team	Apps	(Gls)
2008–2010	Cannes	4	(0)
2010–2011	Wiltz 71	6	(0)
2011–2013	Monts d'Or Azergues Foot	42	(3)
Total		52	(3)

International career
2007–2009	Togo U-17	10	(1)
2010	Togo	1	(0)
- * Club domestic league appearances and goals

Abdou-Malick Korodowou (born 15 December 1990) is a Togolese former professional footballer, who played as a defensive midfielder. He made one appearance for the Togo national team in 2010.

== Club career ==
Born in Lomé, Korodowou began his career with Planète Foot and signed in summer 2006 for AS Cannes. After only four appearances in his two years by AS Cannes in the Championnat National he signed for Wiltz 71 in the Luxembourg National Division. He played six games in the 2010–11 season for Wiltz that season and returned in summer 2011 to French Championnat de France amateur club Monts d'Or Azergues Foot.

== International career ==
Korodowou played in the age of fifteen the 2007 FIFA U-17 World Cup in South Korea. On 13 May 2010, he earned his first call-up for the Togo national team for the Corsica Cup 2010 and made his debut on 21 May 2010 against Gabon.
