= Naoki Yamada =

Japanese footballer

Naoki Yamada 山田 直輝
Personal information
- Full name: Naoki Yamada
- Date of birth: 4 July 1990 (age 36)
- Place of birth: Urawa, Saitama, Japan
- Height: 1.68 m (5 ft 6 in)
- Position: Attacking midfielder

Team information
- Current team: FC Gifu
- Number: 15

Youth career
- Kitaurawa SSS
- 2003–2008: Urawa Red Diamonds

Senior career*
Years	Team	Apps	(Gls)
2008–2019	Urawa Red Diamonds	54	(2)
2015–2017	→ Shonan Bellmare (loan)	67	(8)
2019	→ Shonan Bellmare (loan)	9	(1)
2020–2024	Shonan Bellmare	105	(7)
2025–	FC Gifu	7	(0)

International career
2005–2007	Japan U17	11	(1)
2009	Japan U20	1	(2)
2011–2012	Japan U23	2	(1)
2009–2010	Japan	2	(0)
Medal record
Urawa Red Diamonds
Runner-up	J1 League	2014
Runner-up	J.League Cup	2011
Runner-up	J.League Cup	2013
Winner	Emperor's Cup	2018
Representing Japan
AFC U-16 Championship
Gold medal – first place	2006 Singapore
- * Club domestic league appearances and goals as of 1 January 2026

Naoki Yamada (山田 直輝, Yamada Naoki; born 4 July 1990) is a Japanese footballer who plays for J3 League club FC Gifu.

== Early life ==
Yamada’s father is a former football player who played for Mazda SC and the Japan U-20 national team.

== Youth career ==
Yamada played for the Urawa Red Diamonds youth team from 2003-2008.

== Professional career ==
Yamada continued to play for the Urawa Red Diamonds in the senior squad from 2008-2019. He was part of the Urawa teams which finished second in the 2011 and 2013 J.League Cups, and in the 2014 J1 League. He was also part of the team which won the Emperor’s Cup in 2018.

Yamada played on loan to Shonan Bellmare from 2015-2017, and again in 2019, before transferring permanently to the club in 2020.

== National team career ==
In August 2007, Yamada was selected for the Japan U-17 national team competing at the 2007 U-17 World Cup. He wore the number 10 shirt for Japan and played the entire 90 minutes in all 3 matches.

Yamada made his senior national team debut on 27 May 2009, in a friendly match against Chile at Nagai Stadium in Osaka and assisted on a goal by Keisuke Honda.

== Frequent injuries ==
Yamada has suffered from frequent injuries that kept him out for several matches.

On 6 January 2010 during the 2011 AFC Asian Cup qualification match between Yemen and Japan, Yamada was forced to go out after 21 minutes after his right leg was exposed to a violent break after a challenge from Yemeni defender Ahmed Sadeq. This injury caused him to miss matches for a period of 3 months.

On 20 March 2012, Yamada suffered yet another injury with a break in the anterior cruciate ligament in a match between the Urawa Reds and Vegalta Sendai in the 2012 J. League Cup. The Urawa Reds announced his absence from matches for a period of 6 months. This injury also deprived him of the chance to play for Japan in the 2012 Summer Olympics.

== Career statistics ==
=== Club ===
Updated to 20 February 2019.

Club	Season	League		Emperor's Cup		J. League Cup		ACL		Total	
Club	Season	Apps	Goals	Apps	Goals	Apps	Goals	Apps	Goals	Apps	Goals
Urawa Red Diamonds	2008	1	0	0	0	1	0	0	0	2	0
Urawa Red Diamonds	2009	20	1	1	0	5	2	-		26	3
Urawa Red Diamonds	2010	3	0	0	0	1	0	-		4	0
Urawa Red Diamonds	2011	18	1	4	0	6	0	-		28	1
Urawa Red Diamonds	2012	2	0	0	0	1	0	-		3	0
Urawa Red Diamonds	2013	4	0	1	0	0	0	0	0	5	0
Urawa Red Diamonds	2014	2	0	1	0	2	0	-		5	0
Shonan Bellmare	2015	17	1	2	1	4	1	-		23	3
Shonan Bellmare	2016	11	2	3	2	2	0	-		16	4
Shonan Bellmare	2017	39	5	1	0	-		-		40	5
Urawa Red Diamonds	2018	3	0	1	1	4	0	-		8	1
Total		120	10	14	4	26	3	0	0	160	17

=== International ===
As of 10 August 2011

National team	Year	Apps	Goals
Japan U17	2005	2	0
Japan U17	2006	6	1
Japan U17	2007	3	0
Japan U17	Total	11	1
Japan U20	2009	1	2
Japan U20	Total	1	2
Japan U23	2011	2	1
Japan U23	Total	2	1
Japan	2009	1	0
Japan	2010	1	0
Japan	Total	2	0

International appearances and goals
#	Date	Venue	Opponent	Result	Goal	Competition
2005
	15 November	Paju National Football Center, Paju	Macau U15	26–0	0	2006 AFC U-17 Championship qualification / Japan U15
	17 November	Paju National Football Center, Paju	South Korea U15	1–1	0	2006 AFC U-17 Championship qualification / Japan U15
2006
	3 September	Jalan Besar Stadium, Jalan Besar	Nepal U16	6–0	1	2006 AFC U-17 Championship / Japan U16
	5 September	Jalan Besar Stadium, Jalan Besar	Singapore U16	1–1	0	2006 AFC U-17 Championship / Japan U16
	7 September	Jalan Besar Stadium, Jalan Besar	South Korea U16	3–2	0	2006 AFC U-17 Championship / Japan U16
	11 September	Jalan Besar Stadium, Jalan Besar	Iran U16	1–1	0	2006 AFC U-17 Championship / Japan U16
	14 September	Jalan Besar Stadium, Jalan Besar	Syria U16	2–0	0	2006 AFC U-17 Championship / Japan U16
	17 September	Jalan Besar Stadium, Jalan Besar	North Korea U16	4–2	0	2006 AFC U-17 Championship / Japan U16
2007
	19 August	Gwangyang Football Stadium, Gwangyang	Haiti U17	3–1	0	2007 FIFA U-17 World Cup / Japan U17
	22 August	Gwangyang Football Stadium, Gwangyang	Nigeria U17	0–3	0	2007 FIFA U-17 World Cup / Japan U17
	25 August	Goyang Stadium, Goyang	France U17	1–2	0	2007 FIFA U-17 World Cup / Japan U17
2009
1.	27 May	Nagai Stadium, Osaka	Chile	4–0	0	2009 Kirin Cup
	19 December	Changwon Football Center, Changwon	South Korea U20	2–1	2	Friendly / Japan U20
2010
2.	6 January	Ali Muhesen Stadium, Sana'a	Yemen	3–2	0	2011 AFC Asian Cup qualification
2011
	29 March	JAR Stadium, Tashkent	Uzbekistan U22	2–1	0	Friendly / Japan U22
	10 August	Sapporo Dome, Sapporo	Egypt U22	2–1	1	Friendly / Japan U22

== Honours ==
=== Japan ===
- AFC U-17 Championship: 2006
- Kirin Cup: 2009
