= Baba Tchagouni =

Togolese footballer

Personal information
- Date of birth: 31 December 1990 (age 35)
- Place of birth: Lomé, Togo
- Height: 1.86 m (6 ft 1 in)
- Position: Goalkeeper

Youth career
- 2001–2007: Académie Planète Foot

Senior career*
Years	Team	Apps	(Gls)
2007–2009	Martigues	6	(0)
2009–2013	Dijon	0	(0)
2015–2017	Marmande	36	(1)

International career
2005–2007	Togo U17	21	(0)
2007–2008	Togo U18	3	(0)
2009–2017	Togo	19	(0)
- * Club domestic league appearances and goals

Baba Tchagouni (born 31 December 1990) is a Togolese former professional who played as a goalkeeper.

== Club career ==
Tchagouni began his career with Académie Planète Foot and joined Martigues in July 2007. He made his professional debut on 19 January 2008 in the Championnat National against AC Arles-Avignon. After two years with Martigues he signed on 5 October 2009 a two-year contract with Dijon.

== International career ==
Tchagouni played for the Togo U17 national team in South Korea the 2007 FIFA U-17 World Cup. He earned his first call up for the Togo senior national team on 14 November 2009 for the World Cup Qualifying game against Gabon national football team.
