= Yemi Tella =

Yemi Tella (c. 1951 – 20 October 2007) was the coach of the Nigerian football team that won the 2007 FIFA U-17 World Cup. He was awarded the title of 2007 African coach of the year.

Tella, a former lecturer at the National Institute for Sports in Lagos, had been diagnosed with lung cancer when he led his team to a pre-World Cup eight-nation tournament in South Korea in June 2007.

A month before his death, he was awarded the Member of the Order of the Federal Republic medal - an important honour - for his achievement, by the Nigerian president Umaru Yar'Adua.

Tella spent the last two weeks of his life at the Lagos State Teaching Hospital. He died on 20 October 2007, aged 56.
