= Jens Dyck =

Belgian footballer (born 1990)

Personal information
- Date of birth: 3 March 1990 (age 36)
- Place of birth: Belgium
- Height: 1.79 m (5 ft 10 in)
- Position: Midfielder

Senior career*
Years	Team	Apps	(Gls)
	Club Brugge KV	0	(0)
2009/2010	Waasland-Beveren	1	(0)
- KFC Nijlen
2020-	KFC De Vrede Wechelderzande		
- * Club domestic league appearances and goals

Jens Dyck is a Belgian footballer.
