= Wang Yongxin =

Chinese footballer

Wang Yongxin 王永鑫
Personal information
- Date of birth: 16 January 1990 (age 36)
- Place of birth: Zhengzhou, Henan, China
- Height: 1.85 m (6 ft 1 in)
- Position: Defender

Team information
- Current team: Nantong Zhiyun
- Number: 39

Youth career
- 2008–2010: Chengdu Blades

Senior career*
Years	Team	Apps	(Gls)
2011–2013	Chengdu Blades	37	(0)
2014–2015	Hunan Billows	34	(0)
2016–	Nantong Zhiyun	75	(2)
- * Club domestic league appearances and goals as of 31 December 2020

Wang Yongxin (Chinese: 王永鑫; born 16 January 1990 in Zhengzhou) is a Chinese football player who currently plays for China League One side Nantong Zhiyun.

== Club career ==
In 2011, Wang started his professional footballer career with Chengdu Blades in the Chinese Super League. On 11 June 2011, he made his debut for Chengdu in the 2011 Chinese Super League against Liaoning Whowin, coming on as a substitute for Zhang Li in the 74th minute. On 27 February 2014, Wang transferred to China League One side Hunan Billows.

In March 2016, Wang signed for China League Two side Nantong Zhiyun. He would go on to gain promotion to the second tier when the club finished runners-up at the end of the 2018 China League Two campaign.

== Career statistics ==
Statistics accurate as of match played 31 December 2020.

Appearances and goals by club, season and competition
Club	Season	League			National Cup		Continental		Other		Total	
Club	Season	Division	Apps	Goals	Apps	Goals	Apps	Goals	Apps	Goals	Apps	Goals
Chengdu Blades	2011	Chinese Super League	6	0	0	0	-		-		6	0
Chengdu Blades	2012	China League One	20	0	2	0	-		-		22	0
Chengdu Blades	2013	China League One	11	0	1	0	-		-		12	0
Chengdu Blades	Total		37	0	3	0	0	0	0	0	40	0
Hunan Billows	2014	China League One	16	0	1	0	-		-		17	0
Hunan Billows	2015	China League One	18	0	1	0	-		-		19	0
Hunan Billows	Total		34	0	2	0	0	0	0	0	36	0
Nantong Zhiyun	2016	China League Two	12	0	1	0	-		-		13	0
Nantong Zhiyun	2017	China League Two	17	1	0	0	-		-		17	1
Nantong Zhiyun	2018	China League Two	13	1	3	0	-		-		16	1
Nantong Zhiyun	2019	China League One	20	0	0	0	-		-		20	0
Nantong Zhiyun	2020	China League One	13	0	-		-		-		13	0
Nantong Zhiyun	Total		75	2	4	0	0	0	0	0	79	2
Career total			146	2	9	0	0	0	0	0	155	2
