= James Loembe =

Togolese footballer (born 1991)

Personal information
- Full name: James Loembe
- Date of birth: March 25, 1991 (age 35)
- Place of birth: Lomé, Togo
- Position: Defender

Team information
- Current team: AS Douanes

Youth career
- 2006: Academy Delta

Senior career*
Years	Team	Apps	(Gls)
2007–	AS Douanes	20	(8)

International career
2006–2007	Togo U17	10	(0)
2008–	Togo U20	6	(0)
2011	Togo	1	(0)
- * Club domestic league appearances and goals

James Loembe (born March 25, 1991, in Lomé) is a Togo international footballer.

== Career ==
Loembe began his career with Academy Delta and joined in summer 2007 to AS Douanes. He has turned down offers from top notch teams in Ghana like Accra Hearts of Oak, Tema Youth and league debutantes Bechem Chelsea, saying he is attracted to Kumasi Asante Kotoko because of their youth team, prospects in the CAF Champions League. On 5 November 2008, he featured for Kumasi Asante Kotoko in a trial match against King Faisal Babes in Memory of the late Honour Kwadwo Baah-Wiredu at the Baba Yara Stadium which Kotoko lost by a lone goal to a King Faisal side that had the entire 1st team squad except Goalkeeper Osei Boateng and Ebo 'Nani' Andoh of Black Starlets fame. He played excellently at the heart of the defence throughout the entire 90 minutes of the game which impressed the Technical handlers of Kotoko led by Coach Bashiru Hayford.

== International career ==
Loembe made his national debut for the Young Hawks of Togo in the AFCON U-17 TOGO 2007 on 10 March 2007 at the Stade de Kege in Lomé and played for the entire 90 minutes of the game against South Africa which the Young Hawks won 2–0. He could have captained the squad but for his lack of fluency in French, the team's communication language; he speaks fluently in English, Twi, Ga, Hausa and a little French. Loembe marshalled the defence like the captain of the team throughout the entire tournament and together with his teammates went on to the final, but lost 0–1 to Nigeria, a pre-tournament favourite and eventual winners of FIFA U-17 World Cup KOREA 2007.

On 24 August 2007, Loembe starred for the Young Hawks of Togo in their maiden 2007 FIFA U-17 World Cup tournament in South Korea against Costa Rica and played the entire group matches against Peru and Korea. He played 90 minutes in all these matches.

He was called into the Local Hawks of Togo CHAN team (The African Nations Championships is a new tournament designed by CAF for only home-based players of its member countries) that faced Ghana in Accra on 4 and 13 May 2008.

He made his debut for the senior national team on 10 August 2011 in a friendly match against Niger, and was included in the squad for the next match, a 2012 Africa Cup of Nations qualifier against Botswana.

== Record at FIFA tournaments ==
Tournaments	Editions	MP	W	D	L	GF	GA	Y	2YC	R
FIFA U-17 World Cup Final	2007	3	0	2	1	0	0	0	0	0

=== FIFA U-17 World Cup ===
Edition	Venue	Date	Match	Stage
2007	Ulsan	24 August 2007	KOR 2:1	(1:1) TOG
First stage 2007	Suwon	21 August 2007	TOG 0:0	PER
First stage 2007	Suwon	18 August 2007	CRC 1:1	(0:1) TOG
