= Abdul Naza Alhassan =

Ghanaian footballer

Naza Abdul
Personal information
- Full name: Abdul Naza Alhassan
- Date of birth: June 17, 1990 (age 36)
- Place of birth: Ghana
- Height: 1.64 m (5 ft 5 in)
- Position: Midfielder

Team information
- Current team: Maxbees FC
- Number: 15

Youth career
- Maxbees FC

Senior career*
Years	Team	Apps	(Gls)
2004–2008	Maxbees FC		
2008	Wa All Stars		
2008	Shonan Bellmare	3	(0)
2009	Kessben F.C.		
2009	Mangilao SC		
2011–	Maxbees FC		

International career
2007	Ghana U-17	6	(0)
- * Club domestic league appearances and goals

Abdul Naza Alhassan (born 17 June 1990 in Ghana) is a Ghanaian football player who played for Ghana Premier League side Kessben F.C.

== Career ==
Alhassan began his career Maxbees FC and joined in January 2008 to Wa All Stars, after 6 months leave the club and moved to J2 League team Shonan Bellmare.

== International career ==
He played for U-17 Ghana national team in 2007 FIFA U-17 World Cup in Korea Republic.
