= Tomotaka Okamoto (footballer) =

Japanese footballer

Tomotaka Okamoto 岡本 知剛
Personal information
- Full name: Tomotaka Okamoto
- Date of birth: 29 June 1990 (age 36)
- Place of birth: Onomichi, Hiroshima, Japan
- Height: 1.79 m (5 ft 10 in)
- Position: Midfielder

Team information
- Current team: Roasso Kumamoto

Youth career
- 2003–2005: Sanfrecce Bingo
- 2006–2008: Sanfrecce Hiroshima

Senior career*
Years	Team	Apps	(Gls)
2008–2013	Sanfrecce Hiroshima	10	(0)
2011–2012	→ Sagan Tosu (loan)	60	(1)
2014–2016	Sagan Tosu	40	(0)
2016	→ Shonan Bellmare	1	(0)
2017–2018	Matsumoto Yamaga	16	(1)
2019–	Roasso Kumamoto		

International career^{‡}
2005–2007	Japan U-17	10	(2)
2007–2008	Japan U-19	4	(0)
Medal record
Sanfrecce Hiroshima
Winner	J1 League	2013
Runner-up	J.League Cup	2010
Runner-up	Emperor's Cup	2013
Representing Japan
AFC U-16 Championship
Gold medal – first place	2006 Singapore
- * Club domestic league appearances and goals as of 29 December 2018 ‡ National team caps and goals as of 13 December 2009

Tomotaka Okamoto (岡本 知剛, Okamoto Tomotaka; born 29 June 1990 in Onomichi, Hiroshima) is a Japanese football player currently playing for Roasso Kumamoto.

== National team career ==
In August 2007, Okamoto was elected Japan U-17 national team for 2007 U-17 World Cup. He played full time in all 3 matches as defensive midfielder and scored an opening goal against Haiti in first match.

== Career statistics ==
Updated to 23 February 2018.

Club performance			League		Cup		League Cup		Continental		Total	
Season	Club	League	Apps	Goals	Apps	Goals	Apps	Goals	Apps	Goals	Apps	Goals
Japan			League		Emperor's Cup		League Cup		AFC		Total	
2008	Sanfrecce Hiroshima	J2 League	1	0	0	0	-		-		1	0
2009	Sanfrecce Hiroshima	J1 League	3	0	2	0	2	0	-		7	0
2010	Sanfrecce Hiroshima	J1 League	0	0	1	0	0	0	1	0	2	0
2011	Sagan Tosu	J2 League	34	1	0	0	-		-		34	1
2012	Sagan Tosu	J1 League	26	0	1	0	4	0	-		31	0
2013	Sanfrecce Hiroshima	J1 League	6	0	2	0	0	0	6	0	14	0
2014	Sagan Tosu	J1 League	19	0	3	0	4	0	-		26	0
2015	Sagan Tosu	J1 League	11	0	1	0	3	0	-		15	0
2016	Sagan Tosu	J1 League	10	0	–		3	0	–		13	0
2016	Shonan Bellmare	J1 League	1	0	2	0	–		–		3	0
2017	Matsumoto Yamaga	J2 League	5	0	2	0	-		-		7	0
Career total			116	1	14	0	16	0	7	0	153	1

== National team career statistics ==
As of 8 November 2008

=== Appearances in major competitions ===
Team	Competition	Category	Appearances		Goals	Team record
Team	Competition	Category	Start	Sub	Goals	Team record
Japan	AFC U-17 Championship 2006 Qualification	U-15	1	0	0	Qualified
Japan	AFC U-17 Championship 2006	U-16	6	0	1	Champions
Japan	2007 FIFA U-17 World Cup	U-17	3	0	1	Round 1
Japan	AFC U-19 Championship 2008 Qualification	U-18	1	0	0	Qualified
Japan	AFC U-19 Championship 2008	U-19	3	0	0	Quarterfinal

== Honours ==
=== Sanfrecce Hiroshima ===
- J. League Division 1 (1) : 2013
- J. League Division 2 (1) : 2008
- Japanese Super Cup (2) : 2008, 2013

=== Japan ===
- AFC U-17 Championship (1) : 2006
