= Aristote Lusinga =

French professional footballer (born 1990)

Personal information
- Full name: Aristote Lusinga
- Date of birth: 20 February 1990 (age 36)
- Place of birth: Nantes, France
- Height: 1.80 m (5 ft 11 in)
- Position: Centre-back

Youth career
- 1998–2009: Nantes

Senior career*
Years	Team	Apps	(Gls)
2009–2011	Nantes	4	(0)
2012–2013	Vendée Fontenay Foot	19	(0)
2013–2015	Poiré-sur-Vie	56	(1)
2015–2016	AS Vitré	13	(0)
2016–2017	Lorient B	21	(1)
2017–2018	US Avranches	15	(2)
2018–2020	Nantes B	32	(2)

International career
2005–2006	France U16	13	(1)
2006–2007	France U17	12	(1)
- * Club domestic league appearances and goals

Aristote Lusinga (born 20 February 1990) is a retired French professional footballer who played as a centre-back.

== Club career ==
Lusinga was born in the commune of Dervallières, a suburb of Nantes. He joined his hometown club FC Nantes in 1998. During his time in the youth system, he excelled and earned caps with France's under-15 side and the under-16 side making his debut in the Tournio de Montaigu. On 28 May 2008, he signed his first professional contract with, agreeing to a three-year deal with Nantes.

In June 2018, he returned to Nantes to helps the youngs in the reserve team.

=== Controversy ===
On 17 May 2008, Lusinga was involved in an incident on the final day of the 2007–08 CFA season, while playing with the FC Nantes Reserves, against US Orléans. After receiving a yellow card, from referee Stéphane Jochem, in the 42nd minute, Lusinga would later be cautioned again, prompting a send off. After having words, a very irritated Lusinga headbutted Jochem. Following the match, Lusinga apologized and later sent an apology to the French Football Federation. Despite the remorse, the FFF suspended him from football for a period of two years, with one year being suspended. He was still allowed to train with the club.

Lusinga made his return a year later on 23 May 2009 in a CFA 2 match against US Avranches. He made his league debut a week later on the final match day of the season against Auxerre appearing as a substitute in the 89th minute. Nantes won the match 2–1, but still suffered relegation back to Ligue 2.

== Personal life ==
Lusinga is of Angolan descent.
