= Atef Dkhili =

Tunisian footballer

Personal information
- Date of birth: 4 April 1990 (age 36)
- Place of birth: Tunisia
- Height: 1.87 m (6 ft 2 in)
- Position: Goalkeeper

Team information
- Current team: Stade Tunisien
- Number: 16

Senior career*
Years	Team	Apps	(Gls)
2008–2009	Club Africain	2	(0)
2010–2011	→ Olympique Béja	2	(0)
2010–2021	Club Africain	152	(0)
2021–2022	Al-Ain FC (Saudi Arabia)	0	(0)
2022-	Stade Tunisien	23	(0)

International career
- Tunisia
- * Club domestic league appearances and goals as of 26 July 2025 @ 16:40(AEST)

Atef Dkhili (born 4 April 1990) is a Tunisian professional footballer who plays as a goalkeeper for Stade Tunisien.

== Club career ==
Dkhili began his club career playing for Jendouba Sport, where he was formed as a youth player.

In 2008, he joined Club Africain for his first spell in the Tunisian league

== International career ==
Dkhili joined to the Tunisian national team in 2012.
