= Goriš =

Settlement in Šibenik-Knin County, Croatia

- Settlement
- Interactive map of Goriš
- Location of Goriš in Croatia
- Coordinates: 43°48′17″N 16°00′51″E
- Country: Croatia
- County: Šibenik-Knin
- City: Šibenik

Area
  - Total: 7.5 km^{2} (2.9 sq mi)

Population (2021)
  - Total: 127
  - Density: 17/km^{2} (44/sq mi)
- Time zone: UTC+1 (CET)
  - Summer (DST): UTC+2 (CEST)
- Postal code: 22323 Unešić
- Area code: +385 (0)22

Goriš is a settlement in the City of Šibenik in Croatia. In 2021, its population was 127.

== Demographics ==
Goriš: Population trends 1857–2021
v

population			223	182	218	256	284	287	328	358	387	339	316	232	176	147	127
	1857	1869	1880	1890	1900	1910	1921	1931	1948	1953	1961	1971	1981	1991	2001	2011	2021

Sources: Croatian Bureau of Statistics publications
