= Shohei Otsuka =

Japanese footballer (born 1990)

Personal information
- Full name: Shohei Otsuka
- Date of birth: 11 April 1990 (age 36)
- Place of birth: Osaka, Japan
- Height: 1.79 m (5 ft 10 in)
- Position: Second striker

Team information
- Current team: SC Sagamihara
- Number: 37

Youth career
- 2003–2008: Gamba Osaka

Senior career*
Years	Team	Apps	(Gls)
2009–2012	Gamba Osaka	6	(1)
2012–2014	JEF United Chiba	57	(6)
2015	Giravanz Kitakyushu	16	(1)
2016–2017	Kawasaki Frontale	15	(2)
2018–	SC Sagamihara		

International career^{‡}
2005–2007	Japan U-17	10	(5)
2010	Japan U-21		
Medal record
Gamba Osaka
Runner-up	J1 League	2010
Winner	Emperor's Cup	2009
Runner-up	Emperor's Cup	2012
Kawasaki Frontale
Winner	J1 League	2017
Runner-up	J.League Cup	2017
Runner-up	Emperor's Cup	2016
Representing Japan
Asian Games
Gold medal – first place	2010 Guangzhou	Team
AFC U-16 Championship
Gold medal – first place	2006 Singapore
- * Club domestic league appearances and goals as of 23 February 2018 ‡ National team caps and goals as of 31 December 2008

Shohei Otsuka (大塚 翔平, Ōtsuka Shōhei; born 11 April 1990) is a Japanese football player currently playing for SC Sagamihara.

== National team career ==
In August 2007, Otsuka was elected Japan U-17 national team for 2007 U-17 World Cup. He played all 3 matches.

On 23 September 2010, Otsuka was selected for the Japan Under-21 squad for the 2010 Asian Games held in Guangzhou, China PR.

== Club statistics ==
Updated to 23 February 2018.

Club performance			League		Cup		League Cup		Continental		Total	
Season	Club	League	Apps	Goals	Apps	Goals	Apps	Goals	Apps	Goals	Apps	Goals
Japan			League		Emperor's Cup		J. League Cup		AFC		Total	
2009	Gamba Osaka	J1 League	1	0	0	0	0	0	1	0	2	0
2010	Gamba Osaka	J1 League	4	0	1	1	0	0	3	0	8	1
2011	Gamba Osaka	J1 League	1	1	1	0	1	1	0	0	2	1
2012	Gamba Osaka	J1 League	0	0	–		–		0	0	0	0
2012	JEF United Chiba	J2 League	15	1	2	1	–		–		17	2
2013	JEF United Chiba	J2 League	23	3	1	0	–		–		24	3
2014	JEF United Chiba	J2 League	19	2	1	0	–		–		20	2
2015	Giravanz Kitakyushu	J2 League	16	1	0	0	–		–		16	1
2016	Kawasaki Frontale	J1 League	12	2	1	0	2	2	–		15	4
2017	Kawasaki Frontale	J1 League	3	0	1	0	0	0	1	0	5	0
Total			94	10	8	2	3	3	5	0	110	15

== Appearances in major competitions ==
Team	Competition	Category	Appearances		Goals	Team record
Team	Competition	Category	Start	Sub	Goals	Team record
Japan	AFC U-17 Championship 2006 Qualification	U-15	1	1	4	Qualified
Japan	AFC U-17 Championship 2006	U-16	4	1	1	Champions
Japan	2007 FIFA U-17 World Cup	U-17	2	1	0	Group Stage
Japan	2010 Asian Games	U-21				

== Awards and honours ==
=== Japan ===
- AFC U-17 Championship (1) : 2006
- Asian Games (1) : 2010
