= Julián Guillermo =

Colombian footballer, born 1990

Personal information
- Full name: Julian Guillermo Rojas
- Date of birth: 28 February 1990 (age 36)
- Place of birth: Bogotá, Colombia
- Height: 1.76 m (5 ft 9 in)
- Position: Midfielder

Team information
- Current team: Independiente Santa Fe
- Number: 8

Senior career*
| Years | Team | Apps | (Gls) |
| 2007–2008 | Academia | | |
| 2008–2009 | Cúcuta Deportivo | | |
| 2010–2012 | Banfield | | |
| 2012–2013 | Independiente Medellín | | |
| 2013–20?? | Independiente Santa Fe | | |
- * Club domestic league appearances and goals ‡ National team caps and goals as of June 8, 2012

Julián Guillermo Rojas (born February 28, 1990) is a Colombian footballer who last played for Independiente Santa Fe in the Categoría Primera A.
