= Juan Zevallos =

Peruvian footballer (born 1990)

Personal information
- Full name: Juan José Zevallos Uriarte
- Date of birth: 7 July 1990 (age 36)
- Place of birth: Peru
- Height: 1.73 m (5 ft 8 in)
- Position: Full back

Senior career*
Years	Team	Apps	(Gls)
2006	América Cochahuayco	?	(?)
2007	Universitario	0	(0)
2008	Juan Aurich	14	(0)
2009	Total Chalaco	0	(0)
2010	América Cochahuayco	12	(0)
2011–	José Gálvez	3	(0)

International career
????	Peru U15		
2007	Peru U17	1	(0)
- * Club domestic league appearances and goals as of 30 April 2012

Juan José Zevallos Uriarte (born 7 July 1990) is a Peruvian footballer who plays as a full back. He played for José Gálvez FBC in the 2011 season.

== Club career ==
He started his career out with Segunda División Peruana side América Cochahuayco in 2006.

In 2007, he returned to Universitario de Deportes but did not manage to make a league appearance in the Descentralizado.

Then in 2008 he joined Chiclayo based club Juan Aurich. His debut in the Torneo Descentralizado was in Round 6 of the 2008 season at home against Sport Áncash. He played the entire match and helped his side win the match 3–0 at the Elías Aguirre Stadium.
