= Samuel Atrous =

French footballer (born 1990)

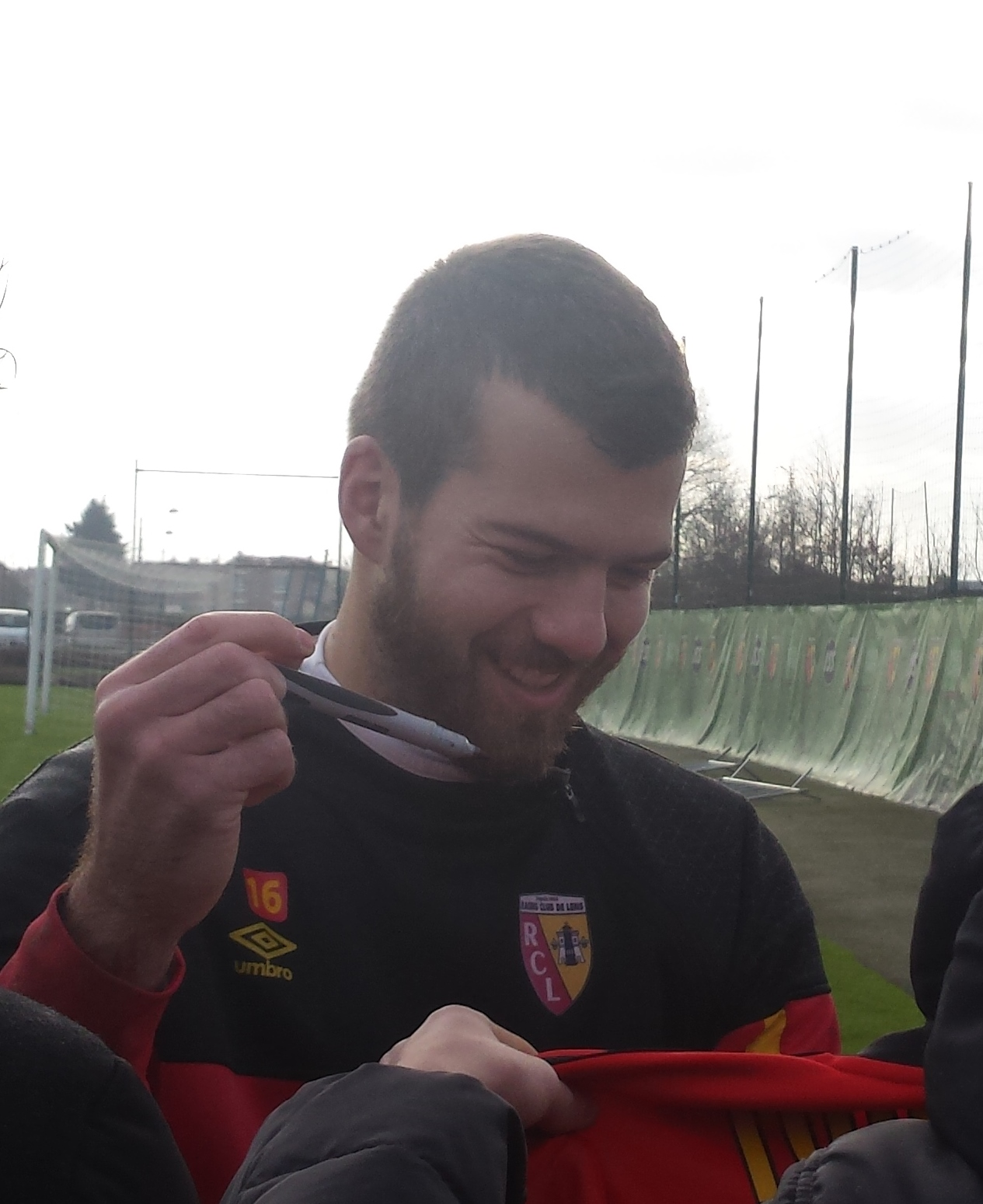
- Atrous at Lens training in 2014

Personal information
- Date of birth: 15 February 1990 (age 36)
- Place of birth: Roncq, France
- Height: 1.90 m (6 ft 3 in)
- Position: Goalkeeper

Team information
- Current team: Wasquehal

Youth career
- Lens

Senior career*
Years	Team	Apps	(Gls)
2010–2016	Lens B	60	(0)
2011–2012	→ Bayonne (loan)	1	(0)
2013–2015	Lens	3	(0)
2015–2017	IC Croix	44	(0)
2017	Wasquehal	8	(0)
2017–2019	Chambly B	22	(0)
2017–2019	Chambly	1	(0)
2019–2021	Beauvais	25	(0)
2021–2023	Wasquehal	53	(0)
2023–2024	EFAFC	12	(0)
2024–	Wasquehal	0	(0)
- * Club domestic league appearances and goals as of 19:09, 8 October 2024 (UTC)

Samuel Atrous (born 15 February 1990) is a French professional footballer who plays as a goalkeeper for Championnat National 1 club Wasquehal.
