= Víctor Ulloa (Peruvian footballer) =

Peruvian footballer (born 1991)

Personal information
- Full name: Víctor Javier Ulloa
- Date of birth: March 15, 1991 (age 35)
- Place of birth: Lima, Peru
- Height: 1.82 m (6 ft 0 in)
- Position: Goalkeeper

Team information
- Current team: Unión Comercio

Youth career
- –2008: Sporting Cristal

Senior career*
Years	Team	Apps	(Gls)
2008–2009	Sporting Cristal		
2010	Colegio Nacional Iquitos		
2011	Carlos A. Mannucci		
2011	Universidad Técnica de Cajamarca		
2012	Universitario Grau		
2014	Atlético Grau		
2014	Defensor La Bocana		
2015-2016	Unión Tarapoto		
2016	Club Deportivo Alfredo Salinas		
2018	Atlético Grau		
2019	Pirata F.C.		
2020	Unión Comercio		
- * Club domestic league appearances and goals

Víctor Ulloa is a Peruvian football goalkeeper, who as of 2020, plays for Peruvian Segunda División club Unión Comercio.

In 2008, he was promoted to Sporting Cristal's first team.
