= US Masséda =

Togolese football club

- Full name: Union Sportif Masséda
- Ground: Masséda, Togo
- League: Togolese Championnat National
- 2009: 10th
| Home colours | Away colours |

Union Sportif Masséda is a Togolese football club based in Masséda. The club was founded in 1972. They play in the top division in Togolese football.

== Performance in CAF competitions ==
- CAF Confederation Cup: 1 appearance

2008 – First round of 16

== Players ==
- Tounde Adekounle
- Alex Kinvi-Boh
