= Usman Amodu =

Nigerian footballer

Personal information
- Full name: Usman Amodu
- Date of birth: 16 December 1990 (age 35)
- Place of birth: Nigeria
- Height: 1.76 m (5 ft 9 in)
- Position: Defender

Youth career
- 2006–2007: Abuja F.C.

Senior career*
Years	Team	Apps	(Gls)
2008–2009	Kaduna United F.C.	34	(5)
2010	Al-Hilal Omdurman	24	(1)
2011–2012	Enyimba International F.C.	30	(3)
2012–2013	Kwara United F.C.	38	(4)
2013–2014	Llaneros F.C.	15	(0)
2014–2015	Sports Light F.C.	14	(3)
2015–2016	Shooting Stars	18	(0)

International career^{‡}
2007	Nigeria U-17	3	(0)
2008–2009	Nigeria U-20	5	(0)
2011–2012	Nigeria U-23	3	(0)
2011–2012	Home Base Super Eagles	3	(0)
- * Club domestic league appearances and goals as of 17 June 2013 ‡ National team caps and goals as of 23 April 2013

Usman Amodu(born 16 December 1990) is a Nigerian footballer who played for the Nigeria national football team and club sides such as Llaneros F.C. in Colombia. His position is defender.

== National team ==
Amodu played in the squad that won the 2007 African Under-17 Championship and the 2007 FIFA U-17 World Cup, where Nigeria obtained its third title. Amodu played three matches during all the tournament.

== Titles ==
Season	Club	Title
2007	Nigeria	African Under-17 Championship
2007	Nigeria	FIFA U-17 World Cup
