= Francis Boadi =

Ghanaian footballer

Personal information
- Date of birth: 23 November 1991 (age 34)
- Place of birth: Dunkwa-on-Offin, Ghana
- Height: 1.70 m (5 ft 7 in)
- Position: Midfielder

Team information
- Current team: Great Olympics

Youth career
- –2005: Great Olympics

Senior career*
Years	Team	Apps	(Gls)
2006–	Great Olympics		

International career
2007	Ghana U-17	5	(0)
- * Club domestic league appearances and goals

Francis Boadi (born 23 November 1991) is a Ghanaian footballer who plays as a midfielder for Great Olympics in the Ghanaian Premiership.

== Career ==
Boadi began his career with Great Olympics and was promoted to Ghana Premier League team in January 2006.

In December 2007, The Sun reported that Reading are to offer him a two-year scholarship. In July 2009 was linked with an possibly move to PFC CSKA Moscow and an club from Georgia. He is currently on trial in Serbian Superliga team Jagodina.

== International ==
Boadi was part of the Ghana side that beat Brazil at the Under-17 World Cup Finals held in South Korea between 18 August and 9 September 2007.

== Honours ==
- 2007 African Under-17 Championship - Third place, Bronze
