= Nathan Goris =

Belgian footballer

Personal information
- Date of birth: 30 March 1990 (age 36)
- Place of birth: Wilrijk, Belgium
- Height: 1.85 m (6 ft 1 in)
- Position: Goalkeeper

Senior career*
Years	Team	Apps	(Gls)
2007–2018	Lierse	22	(0)
2010–2011	→ Turnhout	26	(0)
2018–2019	KFC Lille		
2019–2025	KFC Ranst		
- * Club domestic league appearances and goals as of 7 December 2013

Nathan Goris (born 30 March 1990) is a Belgian professional footballer who plays for KFC Ranst. He's a goalkeeper. He's a youth exponent from Lierse. He made his debut during the 2007–08 season. He was loaned out to K.V. Turnhout during the 2010–11 season.

== Career ==
Goris joined KFC Ranst ahead of the 2019–20 season.
