= Ruthie Quinto =

American school superintendent

- Born: Ruth Francesca Quinto; September 3, 1968 (age 57); Fresno, California
- Other name: Ruth F. Quinto
- Education: California State University, Fresno
- Occupation: Deputy Superintendent / CFO
- Spouse: Frank Hambalek

Ruthie Quinto (Ruth Quinto) (born September 3, 1968) is the Deputy Superintendent and CFO of Fresno Unified School District. Quinto previously served as the City Controller for the City of Fresno, California.

== Early life and education ==
Quinto was born and raised in Fresno, California. Quinto graduated from San Joaquin Memorial High School in 1986 and lived in Fresno until graduating from California State University, Fresno in 1990. Quinto worked most of her career in public accounting in for a certified public accounting firm in southern California, McGladrey & Pullen, LLP, now RSM US, LLP.

Quinto holds a bachelor of science degree in business administration from California State University, Fresno and obtained her CPA license from the California State Board of Accountancy in 1994. Quinto and her husband, Frank, have three children: Rebecca, Jacob and Nicolas.

== Early career ==
In 2001, Quinto became the city controller for the City of Fresno, California.

In 2005, Quinto became the CFO for Fresno Unified School District.

== Tenure ==
In 2004, the Fresno Unified School District was on the verge of state takeover due to poor performance academically and extreme financial difficulties. That year, community leaders and a volunteer interim superintendent, urged a turnaround plan entitled Choosing Our Future: A Community-Wide Call to Action, published in 2005. From 2005 to 2016, Fresno Unified has been referenced as a transitioned system, once nearly dysfunctional to more coherent. Results show that Fresno is fiscally stable and has a high graduation rate.

== Other ==
Quinto serves on the board of trustees for the Community Regional Medical Centers.
