= Prince Segbefia =

Togolese footballer (born 1991)

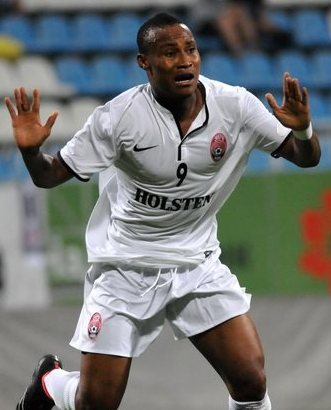
- Segbefia in 2014

Personal information
- Full name: Kossi Prince Segbefia
- Date of birth: 11 March 1991 (age 35)
- Place of birth: Lomé, Togo
- Height: 1.76 m (5 ft 9 in)
- Position: Midfielder

Team information
- Current team: FCOSK 06

Youth career
- 1998–2007: Sporting Club de Lomé
- 2007–2009: Al Ain
- 2009–2010: Auxerre

Senior career*
Years	Team	Apps	(Gls)
2010–2014	Auxerre	60	(3)
2010–2014	Auxerre II	34	(4)
2014–2015	Zorya Luhansk	9	(1)
2015–2016	Elazığspor	24	(5)
2016–2018	Göztepe	28	(3)
2018–2019	Gazişehir Gaziantep	44	(3)
2020	Altay	2	(0)
2020–2021	Tuzlaspor	17	(1)
2021–2022	Al-Ittihad Tripoli		
2022	Alsancak Yeşilova		
2023–2024	Eendracht Aalst	10	(0)
2024–	FCOSK 06	2	(0)

International career^{‡}
2006–2007	Togo U17	8	(0)
2011–	Togo	14	(0)
- * Club domestic league appearances and goals as of 7 December 2024 ‡ National team caps and goals as of 28 December 2014

Kossi Prince Segbefia (born 11 March 1991) is a Togolese professional footballer who plays as a midfielder for French Championnat National 3 club FCOSK 06. He is a Togolese international, having made his debut in September 2011 against Botswana. His older brother, Alikem, is also a footballer who plays for Al-Jaish SC Damascus in Syria.

== Club career ==
=== Early career ===
Born in Lomé, Segbefia began his football career at the Centre de Développement Sportif de Lomé (English: Sports Development Centre of Lomé), also known as Sporting Club de Lomé. He spent nearly a decade at the club before venturing to France where he underwent trials with professional clubs Marseille, Reims, Niort, and Sochaux. Several of the clubs were interested in signing Segbefia to a youth contract, but due to his age, 16 years old at the time, he was not signed. Afterwards, Segbefia returned to Togo where he was spotted by German Winfried Schäfer who was serving as manager of Al Ain in the United Arab Emirates. Segbefia, subsequently, signed with the club. Due to Al Ain being allowed to use only four foreigners in its squad, he spent most of his time with Al Ain playing on the reserve team.

=== Auxerre ===
In 2009, Segbefia returned to his home country and met with former Sporting Club de Lomé player Emmanuel Adebayor. Adebayor recommended that he play in France and contacted Francis de Taddeo who had coached him at Metz and was now serving as the youth academy director of Auxerre. After successfully trialing with the club, Segbefia was signed to a one-year amateur contract. He spent the 2009–10 season playing on Auxerre's under-19 team before earning promotion to the club's reserve team in the Championnat de France amateur, the fourth level of French football, for the 2010–11 season. Segbefia spent the majority of the season with the team making 17 appearances and scoring one goal. In April 2011, he was called up to the senior team by manager Jean Fernandez and made his club debut in a 1–0 league victory over Toulouse appearing as a substitute. A week later, he made his first club start in a 1–1 draw with Lens. Segbefia finished the campaign with four appearances and, on 6 May 2011, signed a three-year professional contract with the club.

== International career ==
=== Youth ===
Segbefia made his youth international debut at under-17 level playing with the Togo under-17 team. He made his debut in a 2006 friendly match against the Burkina Faso. The Togo under-17 team later qualified for both the 2007 African Under-17 Championship and the 2007 FIFA U-17 World Cup. In the former competition, he appeared in all five matches the team contested as it finished runner-up to Nigeria. In the U-17 World Cup, he appeared in two group stage matches; as a starter in a 1–1 draw with Costa Rica and as a substitute in a 2–1 defeat against South Korea. Togo finished its group in last place.

=== Senior ===
On 28 August 2011, Segbefia was called up to the senior national team for the first time for a 2012 Africa Cup of Nations qualifying match against Botswana on 4 September. He made his senior international debut in the match, which Togo won 1–0.

== Career statistics ==
=== Club ===
As of 18 December 2011

Appearances and goals by club, season and competition
Club	Season	League			Cup (Note: Appearances in Coupe de France, Coupe de la Ligue, Trophée des Champions)		Europe (Note: Appearances in UEFA Supercup)		Total	
Club	Season	Division	Apps	Goals	Apps	Goals	Apps	Goals	Apps	Goals
Auxerre	2010–11	Ligue 1	4	0	0	0	0	0	4	0
Auxerre	2011–12	Ligue 1	5	0	2	0	0	0	7	0
Auxerre	Total		9	0	2	0	0	0	11	0
Career total			9	0	2	0	0	0	11	0

=== International ===
As of 31 October 2011

Appearances and goals by national team and year
National team	Season	Apps	Goals
Togo	2011–12	2	0
Total		2	0

Scores and results list Togo's goal tally first, score column indicates score after each Segbefia goal.

List of international goals scored by Prince Segbefia
No.	Date	Venue	Opponent	Score	Result	Competition
1	19 November 2014	Tamale Stadium, Tamale, Ghana	Ghana	2–1	3–1	2015 Africa Cup of Nations qualification
