= Charles Quinto =

Colombian footballer (born 1990)

Personal information
- Date of birth: February 12, 1990 (age 36)
- Place of birth: Bogotá, Colombia

Senior career*
Years	Team	Apps	(Gls)
2010	Millonarios		
2010–2011	Sport Huancayo		
2011–2015	Atlético Torino		
2016	Alianza Universidad		
2018	Alianza Atlético		
- * Club domestic league appearances and goals

Charles Quinto (born February 12, 1990) is a Colombian footballer who played domestically for Millonarios and for Peruvian clubs Sport Huancayo, Atlético Torino, Alianza Universidad and Alianza Atlético.
