= Furug Qodirov =

Tajikistani footballer

Personal information
- Full name: Furug Qodirov
- Date of birth: 2 October 1992 (age 34)
- Place of birth: Tajikistan
- Height: 1.83 m (6 ft 0 in)
- Position: Defender

Team information
- Current team: CSKA Pomir Dushanbe

Youth career
- Dynamo Dushanbe

Senior career*
Years	Team	Apps	(Gls)
2007–2008	Dynamo Dushanbe		
2009–2013	CSKA Pomir Dushanbe		
2014	Khayr Vahdat		
2015–	CSKA Pomir Dushanbe		

International career^{‡}
- Tajikistan U17
	Tajikistan U21	1	(0)
2011–	Tajikistan	3	(0)
- * Club domestic league appearances and goals as of 1 June 2018 ‡ National team caps and goals as of 14 October 2015

Furug Qodirov is a Tajikistani footballer who plays as a defender for CSKA Pomir Dushanbe.

== Career statistics ==
=== International ===
Tajikistan national team
Year	Apps	Goals
2011	3	0
Total	3	0

Statistics accurate as of match played 23 July 2011
