= Solaiman Solaiman =

Syrian footballer (born 1990)

Personal information
- Full name: Solaiman Solaiman
- Date of birth: 6 May 1990 (age 36)
- Place of birth: Syria
- Height: 1.81 m (5 ft 11 1/2 in)
- Position: Midfielder

Team information
- Current team: Al Futowa

Senior career*
Years	Team	Apps	(Gls)
2008–2013	Al Futowa		
2013–	Al-Wahda		

International career^{‡}
2005–2007	Syria U-17		
2007–2008	Syria U-20		
2008–2012	Syria U-23		
2008–	Syria	1	(0)
- * Club domestic league appearances and goals ‡ National team caps and goals as of 11 November 2011

Solaiman Solaiman (Arabic: سُلَيْمَان سُلَيْمَان; born 6 May 1990) is a Syrian professional footballer who plays as a midfielder for Syrian Premier League club Al-Wahda.

== Club career ==
Solaiman began his professional career with Syrian Premier League club Al Futowa. He joined the senior squad on 2008, then joined Al-Wahda in the 2012-2013 season, and together won the Syrian Cup.

== International career ==
Solaiman was a part of the Syrian U-17 national team in the 2007 FIFA U-17 World Cup in South Korea. He plays against Argentina, Spain and Honduras in the group-stage of the 2007 FIFA U-17 World Cup and he scored one goal against Spain in the third match of the group-stage.
