= Alikem Segbefia =

Togolese footballer (born 1990)

Personal information
- Full name: Kuessi Alikem Segbefia
- Date of birth: April 1, 1990 (age 36)
- Place of birth: Lomé, Togo
- Height: 1.67 m (5 ft 5 1/2 in)
- Position: Midfielder

Team information
- Current team: Teshrin

Youth career
- –2006: Sporting Club Lome

Senior career*
| Years | Team | Apps | (Gls) |
| 2007–2009 | GOMIDO FC (Kpalime) | | |
| 2009– | Al-Jaish Damascus | | |
| 2009–2010 | → Teshrin (loan) | | |

International career
| 2007–2008 | Togo U-17 | 6 | (1) |
| 2008– | Togo | 1 | (0) |
- * Club domestic league appearances and goals

Kuessi Alikem Segbefia (born April 1, 1990) is a Togolese footballer, who plays for Teshrin.

== Career ==
Segbefia began his career with Sporting Club Lome on youth side and was transferred to AS Douanes (Lomé). In October 2009 left Gomido to sign for Al-Jaish Damascus, who was later loaned out to Teshrin.

== International career ==
Segbefia presented the Togo U-17 at 2007 FIFA U-17 World Cup, he played by the Championship three games. He played his first international game for Les Eperviers on 10 September 2008 against Zambia national football team.

== Personal life ==
His brother Prince Segbefia, played with him at 2007 FIFA U-17 World Cup.
