= Mohamad Mido =

Syrian footballer (born 1990)

Mohamad Mido محمد درويش ميدو
Personal information
- Full name: Mohamad Darwish Mido
- Date of birth: 11 June 1990 (age 36)
- Place of birth: Aleppo, Syria
- Height: 1.77 m (5 ft 9 1/2 in)
- Position: Midfielder

Team information
- Current team: El Dakhleya

Youth career
- Al-Ittihad

Senior career*
Years	Team	Apps	(Gls)
2008–2010	Al-Ittihad		
2010–2012	Omayya		
2012	Al-Mabarrah	9	(4)
2012–2013	Al-Saqr	6	(0)
2014	Al-Muhafaza		
2014–2015	Al-Ittihad		
2015	Ghazl El Mahalla		
2015–2016	Al-Ittihad		
2016–2017	Jableh		
2017–	El Dakhleya		

International career^{‡}
2006–2007	Syria U-17		
2007–2008	Syria U-20		
2009–2011	Syria U-23		
- * Club domestic league appearances and goals as of 17 January 2012 ‡ National team caps and goals as of 17 January 2012

Mohamad Mido (Arabic: محمد ميدو; born 11 June 1990) is a Syrian footballer who plays for El Dakhleya in Egypt. His younger brother Hamid Mido plays for Al-Minaa.
