= Eric Opoku (footballer) =

Ghanaian footballer (born 1991)

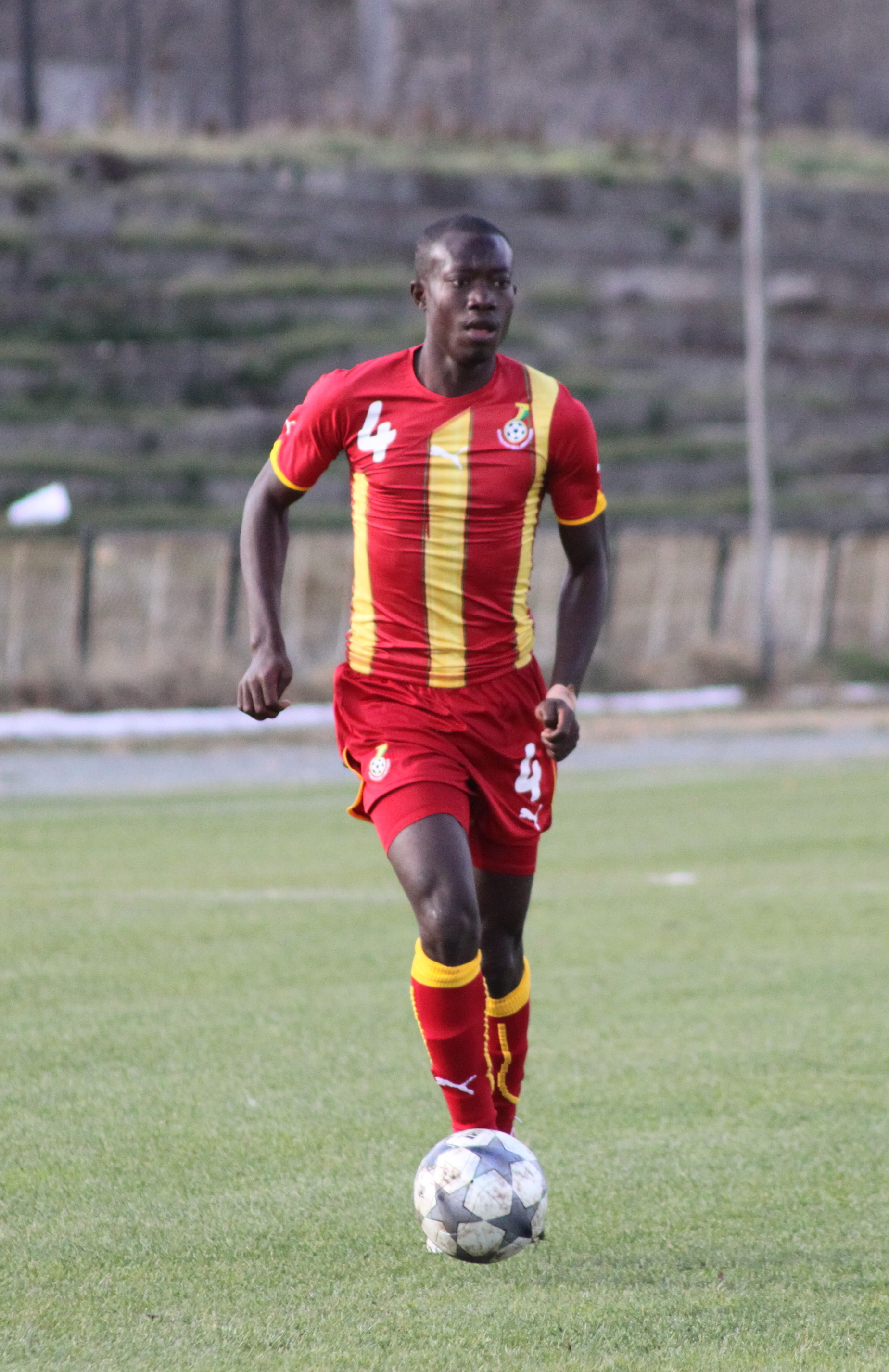

Personal information
- Full name: Eric Kwaku Opoku-Agyemang
- Date of birth: November 11, 1991 (age 34)
- Place of birth: Kumasi, Ashanti, Ghana
- Position: Midfielder

Youth career
- 2007: Corners Babies

Senior career*
| Years | Team | Apps | (Gls) |
| 2007 | Accra Hearts of Oak | | |
| 2011–2016 | Ashanti Gold SC | | |

International career
| 2007 | Ghana U-17 | 4 | (0) |
| 2010–2011 | Ghana U-20 | ? | (?) |
- * Club domestic league appearances and goals

Eric Opoku-Agyemang (born November 11, 1991, in Kumasi) is a Ghanaian footballer who currently plays for al Nasir Kuwait.

== Career ==
Opoku began his career with Corners Babies, and joined Accra Hearts of Oak SC in 2008. After a short stint there he signed with Asante Kotoko. He played his debut match for Asante Kotoko in the CAF Champions League against Étoile du Sahel. After three years with Asante Kotoko, joined to Ghana Premier League rival Ashanti Gold SC. He was voted the BEST PLAYER OF GHANA in the just ended Ghana Premier League 2015. He is a utility player who plays as a centre back and a defensive midfielder. He is nicknamed "Hello Kwaku"

== International career ==
He played with the Ghana national under-17 football team at the 2007 FIFA U-17 World Cup in South Korea.
