= Joo Sung-hwan =

South Korean footballer

Joo Sung-Hwan
Personal information
- Full name: Joo Sung-Hwan
- Date of birth: 24 August 1990 (age 36)
- Place of birth: South Korea
- Height: 1.78 m (5 ft 10 in)
- Position: Striker

Team information
- Current team: Ayutthaya
- Number: 10

Youth career
- Hanyang University

Senior career*
Years	Team	Apps	(Gls)
2012	Chunnam Dragons	17	(2)
2013	→ Gyeongju KHNP (loan)	15	(1)
2014	Port	29	(2)
2015	Phichit	27	(7)
2016	Ayutthaya Warrior	16	(5)
2017–	Ayutthaya	0	(0)

International career
2007	South Korea U17	3	(0)
- * Club domestic league appearances and goals as of 7 July 2013

Joo Sung-Hwan (Korean: 주성환; born 24 August 1990) is a South Korean footballer who plays as a striker for Ayutthaya in the Thai League 3.
