= Masséda =

- Town
- Location within Togo
- Coordinates: 6°27′1″N 1°40′57″E
- Country: Togo
- Region: Maritime Region
- Prefecture: Lacs

Masséda is a town in South East Togo. The area was formerly known as Masseville.

It is notable as it is the home of the US Masséda football club.
