= 1990 in association football =

The following are the association football events of the year 1990 throughout the world.

== Events ==
- March 28 – Sweden's Bo Johansson makes his debut as the manager of Iceland, defeating Luxembourg 2–1.
- March 31 – NAC Breda sacks manager Hans Verèl.
- May 16 – Juventus win the two-legged 1990 UEFA Cup Final, beating fellow Italian side Fiorentina 3–1 on aggregate. This was the first European competition final between two Italian clubs.
- May 17 – Manchester United beats Crystal Palace 1–0 in a replay to claim the FA Cup. The only goal is scored by Lee Martin.
- May 23 – Milan beats Benfica 1–0 in the 1990 European Cup Final. The only goal is scored by Frank Rijkaard.
- July 8 – West Germany wins the 1990 FIFA World Cup in Rome, Italy, defeating defending reigning champions Argentina 1–0 in the final.
- September 8 – Franz Beckenbauer is appointed manager at Marseille.
- September 12 – Euro 1992 qualifying: there are great surprises at Landskrona, Sweden, where the Faroe Islands, in their first competitive international match, defeat Austria 1–0. It is the "Waterloo Day" in Austrian football, and national happiness day for Faroes.
- September 12 – East Germany plays its last ever international match, defeating Belgium 2–0 in Brussels.
- September 19 – Dutch team Vitesse Arnhem makes its European debut with a win (1–0) in Northern Ireland against Derry City in the first round of the UEFA Cup. The only goal is scored by striker Huub Loeffen in the 18th minute.
- October 10 – Copa Libertadores 1990 is won by Olimpia Asunción after defeating Barcelona Sporting Club on an aggregate score of 3–1.
- October 17 – Croatia host their first match in the modern period after gaining independence from Yugoslavia, a friendly against United States in Zagreb. Croatia wins 2–1, and the first goal for the Croats in the modern era is scored by Aljoša Asanović.
- November 5 – Manager Howard Kendall is fired by Manchester City and succeeded by Peter Reid.
- December 9 – Milan again wins the Intercontinental Cup in Tokyo, this time by defeating Paraguay's Olimpia Asunción (3–0). Frank Rijkaard scores twice for the Italians.

== Winners of national championships ==
=== Asia ===
- Qatar – Al-Rayyan

=== Europe ===
- Albania – Dinamo Tirana
- Austria – Swarovski Tirol
- Belgium – Club Brugge
- Bulgaria – CSKA Sofia
- Cyprus – APOEL
- Czechoslovakia – Sparta Prague
- Denmark – Brøndby
- East Germany – Dynamo Dresden
- England – Liverpool
- France – Marseille
- Greece – Panathinaikos
- Hungary – Újpest
- Ireland – St Patrick's Athletic
- Italy – Napoli
- Luxembourg – Avenir Beggen
- Malta – Valletta
- Netherlands – Ajax
- Northern Ireland – Portadown
- Norway – Rosenborg
- Poland – Lech Poznań
- Portugal – Porto
- Romania – Dinamo București
- Scotland – Rangers
- Soviet Union – Dynamo Kyiv
- Spain – Real Madrid
- Sweden – IFK Göteborg
- Switzerland – Grasshopper Club Zürich
- Turkey – Beşiktaş
- West Germany – Bayern Munich
- Yugoslavia – Red Star Belgrade

=== North America ===
- Canada – Vancouver 86ers (CSL)
- Mexico – Puebla
- United States – Maryland Bays (APSL)

=== South America ===
- Argentina – River Plate
- Bolivia – Oriente Petrolero
- Brazil – Corinthians
- Paraguay – Cerro Porteño

== International Tournaments ==
- African Cup of Nations in Algeria (March 2 – 16 1990)
  1. Algeria
  2. Nigeria
  3. Zambia
- North American Nations Cup (May 6 – 13 1990)
  1. Canada
  2. Mexico
  3. United States B
- FIFA World Cup in Italy (June 8 – July 8, 1990)
  1. West Germany
  2. Argentina
  3. Italy

== Births ==
=== January ===
- January 1
  - Gvantsa Dolidze, Georgian footballer
  - Al Naem Mohamed Osman Al Noor, Sudanese footballer
- January 2
  - Maurício Alves Peruchi, Brazilian footballer (d. 2014)
  - Muhammed Shakhbari, Arab-Israeli footballer
- January 3
  - Yoichiro Kakitani, Japanese footballer
  - Maximilian Karner, Austrian footballer
- January 4
  - Iago Falque, Spanish footballer
  - Alberto Paloschi, Italian footballer
- January 5 — Leroy Fer, Dutch international footballer
- January 8
  - Hassan Adhuham, Maldivian footballer
  - Sascha Bigalke, German footballer
  - Thomas Kral, Austrian footballer
- January 11
  - Dadie Mayila, Congolese professional footballer
  - Raynaldo Sturrup, Bahamian international footballer
- January 12 — Jhoan Viafara, Colombian footballer
- January 15 — Fernando Forestieri, Italian footballer
- January 20
  - Tom Christian Merkens, German footballer
  - Tales, it (Tales Tlaija de Souza), Brazilian footballer
- January 21
  - Arash Afshin, Iranian international
  - Diogo Amado, Portuguese youth international
  - Andriy Bohdanov, Ukrainian international
  - André Martins, Portuguese international
- January 22 — Rafael Goiano, Brazilian footballer
- January 23
  - Şener Özbayraklı, Turkish international
  - Martyn Waghorn, English youth international
- January 26 — Mohammadreza Zeynalkheiri, Iranian footballer
- January 29 — Roberto (Roberto Gomes Júnior), Brazilian footballer

=== February ===
- February 3 — Diego Maia, Brazilian footballer
- February 5 — Dalton, Brazilian footballer
- February 9 — Facundo Affranchino, Argentine footballer
- February 12 — Hamilton Chasi, Ecuadorian footballer
- February 13
  - Marco Romizi, Italian footballer
  - Mamadou Sakho, French footballer
  - Kevin Strootman, Dutch footballer
- February 15
  - Narmina Mammadova, Azerbaijani former footballer
  - Fidel Martínez, Ecuadorian footballer
- February 17 — Łukasz Kominiak, Polish former footballer
- February 18
  - David Guzmán, Costa Rican footballer
  - Bryan Oviedo, Costa Rican footballer
- February 23 — Terry Hawkridge, English footballer
- February 25 — Rafael Romo, Venezuelan footballer

=== March ===
- March 6 — Tryfonas Kroustalelis, Greek footballer
- March 7 — Nihal Chandran, Indian footballer
- March 15 — Jaroslav Kasprisin, Slovak retired footballer
- March 9
  - Christian La Torre, Peruvian footballer
  - Jonathan Sykes, Bahamian international footballer
- March 19
  - Anthony Skorich, Australian soccer player
  - Jonathan Urretavizcaya, Uruguayan footballer
- March 21 — Sharif Mukhammad, Afghan football player
- March 23 — Diamond Thopola, South African soccer player
- March 27 — Jefferson Pinto, Ecuadorian footballer
- March 28 — Pablo Sánchez, Mexican professional footballer
- March 30
  - Diogo Freire, Portuguese footballer
  - Juremy Reker, Dutch footballer

=== April ===
- April 3 — Jovana Zlatičanin, Montenegrin footballer
- April 17 — Luka Radulovic, Austrian footballer
- April 19
  - Héctor Herrera, Mexican footballer
  - Damien Le Tallec, French footballer
  - Patrick Wiegers, German footballer
- April 23 — Amando Aust, German professional footballer
- April 26 — Roberto Cunha, Brazilian professional footballer
- April 27 — Luís Pedro, Dutch-Angolan footballer

=== May ===
- May 2 — Daniel Sánchez, Peruvian footballer
- May 4 —David Hasler, Liechtenstein footballer
- May 10 — Mehdi Reza, Qatari footballer
- May 11 — Denis Osadchenko, Ukrainian-German retired footballer
- May 19 — Víctor Ibarbo, Colombian footballer
- May 20 — Philipp Stiller, German footballer
- May 21 — Sebastian Kosiorowski, Polish professional footballer
- May 22 — David Camps, French footballer
- May 23 — Rafa, Brazilian footballer
- May 24
  - Ricardo Chará, Colombian footballer
  - Anderson Cueto, Peruvian footballer
  - Juxhin Xhaja, Albanian football referee
- May 27 — Jonas Hector, German international footballer
- May 29 — Eric Schaaf, German footballer

=== June ===
- June 1
  - Miller Bolaños, Ecuadoran international
  - Kennie Chopart, Danish club footballer
  - Martin Pembleton, club footballer
- June 5 — Jugeshor Singh, Indian footballer
- June 15 — Lucas Klysman, Brazilian footballer
- June 21 — François Moubandje, Cameroonian-Swiss footballer
- June 22 — Kyrylo Petrov, Ukrainian football defender
- June 23 — René Felix, Austrian footballer
- June 24 — Kelvin Leerdam, Dutch footballer

=== July ===
- July 1 — Ángelo Balanta, Colombian footballer
- July 15
  - Michael Castro, Ecuadorian footballer
  - Marcel Wehr, German footballer
- July 17 — Lenin Porozo, Ecuadorian footballer
- July 22 — Anaqi Sufi Omar Baki, Bruneian footballer
- July 25 — Carlos Carbonero, Colombian international footballer

=== August ===
- August 2 — Tony Mamodaly, German former professional footballer
- August 6 — Suzana Vujošević, Serbian–Montenegrin footballer
- August 8 — Abel Hernández, Uruguayan footballer
- August 11 — Lerin Duarte, Dutch footballer
- August 13 — Cristian Nazarith, Colombian footballer
- August 21 — Francisco Ubiera, Dominican international footballer
- August 23
  - Reimond Manco, Peruvian footballer
  - Exaucé Mayombo, German–Congolese retired footballer
- August 27 — Anton Dahlström, Swedish footballer
- August 31 — Catherine Hyndman, Northern Irish footballer and football coach

=== September ===
- September 6 — Harald Bonimeier, German footballer
- September 8 — Néstor Duarte, Peruvian footballer
- September 13 — Szymon Salski, Polish footballer
- September 14
  - Douglas Costa, Brazilian footballer
  - Santiago García, Uruguayan footballer
  - Ana Viegas, Portuguese footballer
- September 15 — Tamta Malidze, Georgian footballer
- September 18 — Mauricio Arroyo, Colombian footballer
- September 19
  - Marco Pérez, Colombian footballer
  - Ernesto Salazar, Peruvian footballer

=== October ===
- October 1
  - Jan Kirchhoff, German footballer
  - Pedro Filipe Mendes, Portuguese footballer
  - Albert Prosa, Estonian footballer
- October 11 — Sergei Luzhkov, Russian footballer
- October 17 — Artem Shelestynskyi, Ukrainian footballer
- October 20 — Thomas Helly, Austrian footballer
- October 22 — Dan Gogoșoiu, Romanian footballer
- October 27 — Deison Méndez, Ecuadorian footballer
- October 28 — Krystal Parker, English footballer

=== November ===
- November 9 — James Harper, English club footballer
- November 11
  - Lucas Poli, Brazilian footballer
  - Georginio Wijnaldum, Dutch footballer
- November 13 — Žan Cankar, Slovenian footballer
- November 20 — Santos Navarro, Bolivian footballer

=== December ===
- December 2
  - Emmanuel Agyemang-Badu, Ghanaian footballer
  - Jamille Matt, Jamaican footballer
  - Gastón Ramírez, Uruguayan footballer
- December 7
  - David de Gea, Spanish footballer
  - Rafael Uiterloo, Dutch footballer
- December 12 — Pablo Camacho, Venezuelan footballer
- December 16 — Manas Das, Indian footballer
- December 27
  - Luis Trujillo, Peruvian footballer
  - Lucas Parra, Spanish footballer
- December 28 — Marcos Alonso, Spanish footballer

== Deaths ==
=== January ===
- January 15 – David Longhurst, English footballer. (born 1965)

=== March ===
- March 20 – Lev Yashin, Soviet international footballer (born 1929)

=== April ===
- April 1 – Carlos Peucelle, Argentine midfielder, runner-up of the 1930 FIFA World Cup and considered one of Argentina's finest wingers in their history. (81)
- April 17 – Angelo Schiavio, Italian striker, winner of the 1934 FIFA World Cup and topscorer of the 1931–32 Serie A . (84)
- April 30 – Mario Pizziolo, Italian midfielder, winner of the 1934 FIFA World Cup. (80)

=== May ===
- May 1 – Djalma Dias, Brazilian defender, 21 times capped for the Brazil national football team. (50)

=== July ===
- July 16 – Miguel Muñoz, Spanish midfielder, Captain of Real Madrid when they were European Champions in 1956 and 1957. (68)
- July 21 – Heitor Canalli, Brazilian midfielder, Brazilian squad member at the 1934 FIFA World Cup. (83)

=== October ===
- October 25 – Costa Pereira, Portuguese international footballer (born 1929)
- October 30 – Willy Jürissen, German international footballer (born 1912)

=== November ===
- November 11 – Attilio Demaría, Argentine/Italian striker, winner of the 1934 FIFA World Cup. Demaria has the distinction of having played in two FIFA World Cup final matches with two different national teams. (81)

=== December ===
- December 24 – Rodolfo Orlandini, Argentine midfielder, runner-up of the 1930 FIFA World Cup. (85)
