= Kral =

Kral, Král or KRAL may refer to:

- Kral (surname)
- Král, a Czech surname
- Kráľ (surname), a Slovak surname
- Kráľ, a village in Slovakia
- KRAL, an AM radio station licensed to Rawlins, Wyoming, U.S.
- Riverside Municipal Airport, California, United States (ICAO code: KRAL)
- Kral TV, a music television channel in Turkey
- Kral Şakir, a Turkish anthropomorphical animated television series
- Kral, a kashmiri name used for a potter.

== See also ==
- Kraal
- Krall (disambiguation)
- Krol
