= Mertens =

Mertens (Dutch pronunciation: [ˈmɛrtəns]) is a surname of Flemish origin, meaning "son of Merten" (Martin). It is the fifth most common name in Belgium with 18,518 people in 2008.

== Geographical distribution ==
As of 2014, 43.4% of all known bearers of the surname Mertens were residents of Germany (frequency 1:2,728), 34.8% of Belgium (1:487), 8.8% of the United States (1:60,847), 5.9% of the Netherlands (1:4,188), 1.7% of France (1:57,632) and 1.0% of Brazil (1:299,871).

In Belgium, the frequency of the surname was higher than national average (1:487) only in one region: Flemish Region (1:367).

In Germany, the frequency of the surname was higher than national average (1:2,728) in the following regions:

1. North Rhine-Westphalia (1:970)
2. Saxony-Anhalt (1:1,361)

In the Netherlands, the frequency of the surname was higher than national average (1:4,188) in the following provinces:.

1. Limburg (1:959)
2. North Brabant (1:2,002)

== Noble House of Mertens de Wilmars ==
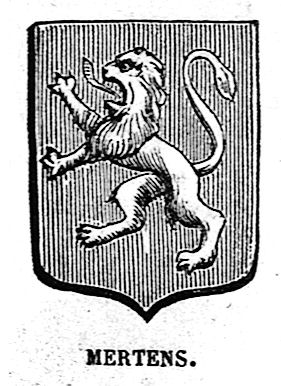
Crest of the House of Mertens

- Charles Mertens de Wilmars (1921–1994), Belgian psychiatrist
- Josse Mertens de Wilmars (1912–2002), Belgian jurist

== Others ==
=== C ===
- Charles Mertens (1862–1919), Belgian painter, printmaker and illustrator
- Christian Mertens (born 1991), German politician
- Claas Mertens (born 1992), German rower
- Conner Mertens (born ca. 1994), American football player

=== D ===
- Dries Mertens (born 1987), Belgian footballer
- Dylan Mertens (born 1995), Dutch footballer

=== E ===
- Elise Mertens (born 1995), Belgian tennis player
- Els Mertens (born 1966), Belgian racing cyclist
- Ewald Mertens (1909–1965), German middle-distance runner

=== F ===
- Frank Mertens (born 1961), German keyboardist and composer
- Franz Mertens (1840–1927), German mathematician
  - Mertens conjecture, Mertens function, Mertens' theorems, and Meissel–Mertens constant
- Franz Carl Mertens (1764–1831), German botanist

=== G ===
- Gregory Mertens (1991–2015), Belgian footballer

=== H ===
- Helmut Mertens (1917–1984), German fighter ace

=== J ===
- Jan Mertens the Younger (died ca. 1527), South Netherlandish painter
- Jan Mertens (1904–1964), Belgian cyclist.
- Jan Mertens (1916–2000), Dutch politician
- Jan Mertens (born 1995), Belgian footballer
- Jean-François Mertens (1946–2012), Belgian game theorist known
  - Mertens-stable equilibrium, Mertens' voting game
- Jerry Mertens (born 1936), American football cornerback
- Jim Mertens (born 1947), American football player
- John J. Mertens (1869 – >1924), South Dakota politician
- Joseph Mertens (1921–2007), Belgian archaeologist

=== K ===
- Karl Heinrich Mertens (1796–1830), German botanist and naturalist
- Klaus Mertens (born 1949), German bass singer
- Klaus Mertens (born 1950), German artist

=== L ===
- Lennart Mertens (born 1992), Belgian footballer
- Linda Mertens (born 1978), Belgian singer
- Lothar Mertens (1959–2006), German historian

=== M ===
- Michael Mertens (born 1965), German shot putter

=== P ===
- Peter Mertens (born 1969), Belgian author and politician
- Pierre Mertens (1939–2025), Belgian-French writer and lawyer
- Pieter Mertens (born 1980), Belgian road bicycle racer
- Peter Mertens (born 1944) Canadian politician
- Paul Mertens (born 1957) Songwriter and creator of Pitti Polak

=== R ===
- René Mertens (1922–2014), Belgian racing cyclist
- Reni Mertens (1918–2000), Swiss documentary filmmaker
- Robert Mertens (1894–1975), German herpetologist
  - Mertens' water monitor
  - Robert Mertens's day gecko

=== S ===
- Sibylle Mertens-Schaaffhausen (1797–1857), German art collector and musician
- Stéphane Mertens (born 1959), Belgian motorcycle road racer

=== T ===
- Thomas Mertens (fl. 1666–1669, Flemish still life painter
- Tim Mertens (born 1986), Belgian racing cyclist

=== W ===
- W. Mertens (fl. 1650–1675), Flemish still life painter
- Wim Mertens (born 1953), Belgian musician

=== Y ===
- Yannick Mertens (born 1987), Belgian tennis player

=== Z ===
- Zenia Mertens (born 2001), Belgian footballer

== Fictional characters ==
- Finn Mertens, main protagonist of the American animated television series Adventure Time
- Martin Mertens, a character who is Finn's Father in the American animated television series Adventure Time
- Mertens, the protagonist of the 1998 PlayStation video game Colony Wars: Vengeance

== See also ==
- Mehrtens
- Meertens
- Merten (name)
- Merten
