= Pembleton =

Surname

Pembleton may refer to:

- Arthur Pembleton, English footballer
- Martin Pembleton, English footballer
- Frank Pembleton, a fictional homicide detective on the television drama series Homicide: Life on the Street
