= Jonathan Sykes =

Jonathan Sykes may refer to:

- Jonathan Sykes (footballer)
- Jonathan Sykes (engineer)
