= Merkens =

Merkens is a surname. Notable people with the surname include:

- Betty Merken, American painter and printmaker
- Guido Merkens (born 1955), American football player
- Tom Christian Merkens (born 1990), German footballer
- Toni Merkens (1912–1944), German racing cyclist

== See also ==
- Mertens
