= Pablo Sánchez =

Pablo Sánchez may refer to:

- Pablo Sánchez (footballer, born 1983), Spanish professional football left winger
- Pablo Sánchez (racing driver) (born 1990), Mexican racing driver
- Pablo Sánchez (footballer, born 1990), Mexican football defensive midfielder
- Pablo Sánchez (footballer, born 1995), English football goalkeeper
- Pablo Sanchez, a fictional character from the Backyard Sports video game series
- Pablo Elier Sánchez, Cuban football manager

== See also ==
- Vitamina Sánchez (born 1973), Argentine football midfielder born Pablo Andrés Sánchez Spucches
