= Luzhkov =

Luzhkov (masculine, Russian: Лужков) or Luzhkova (feminine, Russian: Лужкова) is a Russian surname. Notable people with the surname include:

- Sergei Luzhkov (born 1990), Russian soccer player
- Yury Luzhkov (1936–2019), Russian politician
