= David Camp =

David Camp may refer to:

- Dave Camp (born 1953), U.S. Representative from Michigan
- David M. Camp (1788–1871), Vermont attorney and politician

== See also ==
- Camp David
- David Camps (born 1990), French footballer
