= Král =

Král (feminine: Králová) is a Czech surname, meaning 'king'. The surname could have originated in several different ways: as an ironic nickname for someone with a haughty demeanor, a nickname for someone who resembled a king in appearance, a designation for someone who won a competition, etc. A Slovak cognate of the surname is Kráľ. An Anglicised and Germanised version of the surname is Kral. Notable people with the surname include:

== Sports ==
- Alex Král (born 1998), Czech footballer
- Filip Král (born 1999), Czech ice hockey player
- Jan Král (born 1999), Czech footballer
- Jaroslav Král (born 1948), Czech boxer
- Jiří Král (born 1981), Czech volleyball player
- Josef Král (born 1990), Czech racing driver
- Lukáš Král (born 1976), Czech ice dancer
- Matej Král (born 1990), Slovak footballer
- Miroslav Král (born 1986), Czech footballer
- Tereza Králová (born 1989), Czech athlete
- Tomáš Král (born 1992), Czech ice hockey player
- Vojtěch Král (born 1988), Czech orienteer

== Other ==
- Ivan Král (1948–2020), Czech musician
- Johann Král (1823–1912), Czech viola player
- Lucie Králová (born 1982), Czech dancer and model
- Oldřich Král (1930–2018), Czech sinologist
- Petr Král (1941–2020), Czech writer
