= Sturrup =

Sturrup is a surname. Notable people with the surname include:

- Chandra Sturrup (born 1971), Bahamian track and field sprint athlete
- Raynaldo Sturrup (born 1990), Bahamian footballer

== See also ==
- Stirrup
