= Rafael Morales =

Rafael Morales may refer to:

- Rafael Morales (poet) (1919–2005), Spanish poet
- Rafael Morales (footballer, born 1988), Guatemalan footballer
- Rafael Morales (footballer, born 1892) (1892–1932), Spanish footballer
- Rafael Morales (bishop), bishop of the Episcopal Diocese of Puerto Rico

== See also ==
- Rafael Molera (1881–1930), Spanish footballer
- Rafael Moreira (disambiguation)
