= Miroslav Kral =

Miroslav Kral may refer to:

- Miroslav Král (born 1986), Czech footballer
- Miroslav Kráľ (born 1947), Slovak footballer
