= Merten (name) =

Merten is both a given name and a surname. Notable people with the name include:

- Alan G. Merten (born 1941), American official
- Bjorn Merten, American football player
- Christa Merten (1944–1986), West German athlete
- Helena Merten (born 1995), Australian high diver
- Karl-Friedrich Merten (1905–1993), German U-boat commander
- Ken Merten (born 1945), American swimmer
- Kenneth H. Merten, American diplomat
- Lauri Merten (born 1960), American golfer
- Max Merten (1911–1971), Nazi official during the Axis occupation of Greece
- Merten de Keyser, French painter

== See also ==
- Merten
- Merten (company)
- Mertens
