= Thomas Helly =

Austrian footballer

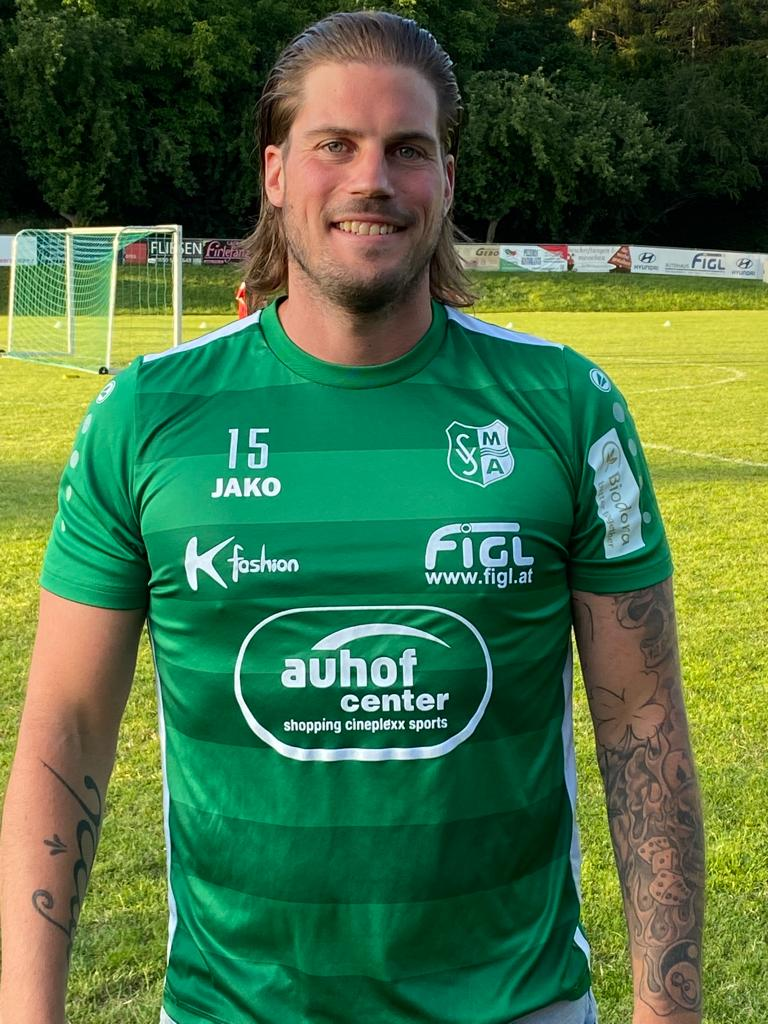

Personal information
- Full name: Thomas Helly
- Date of birth: 20 October 1990 (age 36)
- Place of birth: Vienna, Austria
- Height: 1.83 m (6 ft 0 in)
- Position: Forward

Team information
- Current team: TSU Obergänserndorf
- Number: 9

Youth career
- FK Austria Wien

Senior career*
Years	Team	Apps	(Gls)
2008	SC Schwanenstadt	7	(0)
2008–2013	Wiener Neustadt	36	(5)
2008–2010	→ SV Wienerberg (loan)	31	(25)
2010–2011	→ Wiener Sport-Club (loan)	18	(16)
2012–2013	→ TSV Hartberg (loan)	25	(3)
2013–2014	SC Mannsdorf	26	(11)
2014–2020	SV Wienerberg	151	(84)
2020–	TSU Obergänserndorf	6	(2)
- * Club domestic league appearances and goals as of 00:58, 17 January 2021 (UTC)

Thomas Helly (born 20 October 1990) is an Austrian footballer who plays for SC Mannsdorf. He previously played in the Austrian Bundesliga for TSU Obergänserndorf.
