= Kral (surname) =

Kral is a surname. It is an Anglicised and Germanised version of the Czech surname Král and Slovak surname Kráľ, but it also appears in South Asia. Notable people with the surname include:

- Gustav Kral (1983–2009), Austrian footballer
- Irene Kral (1932–1978), American jazz singer
- Pamela Keevil Kral (born 1955), British actress
- Robert J. Kral (born 1967), Australian film and television composer
- Roy Kral (1921–2002), American jazz pianist and vocalist
- Soch Kral (1782–1854), Kashmiri Sufi poet and a Sufi saint
- Thomas Kral (born 1990), Austrian footballer
