= Meertens =

Meertens is a Dutch patronymic surname (son of Meerten/Maarten). It may refer to:

- Jacques Meertens (born 1948), Dutch clarinetist
- Lambert Meertens (born 1944), Dutch computer scientist
  - Bird–Meertens formalism, Meertens number
- Piet Meertens (1899–1985), Dutch dialectologist and ethnologist
  - Meertens Institute, research institute for Dutch language and culture

== See also ==
- Mertens
