= René Felix =

Austrian footballer

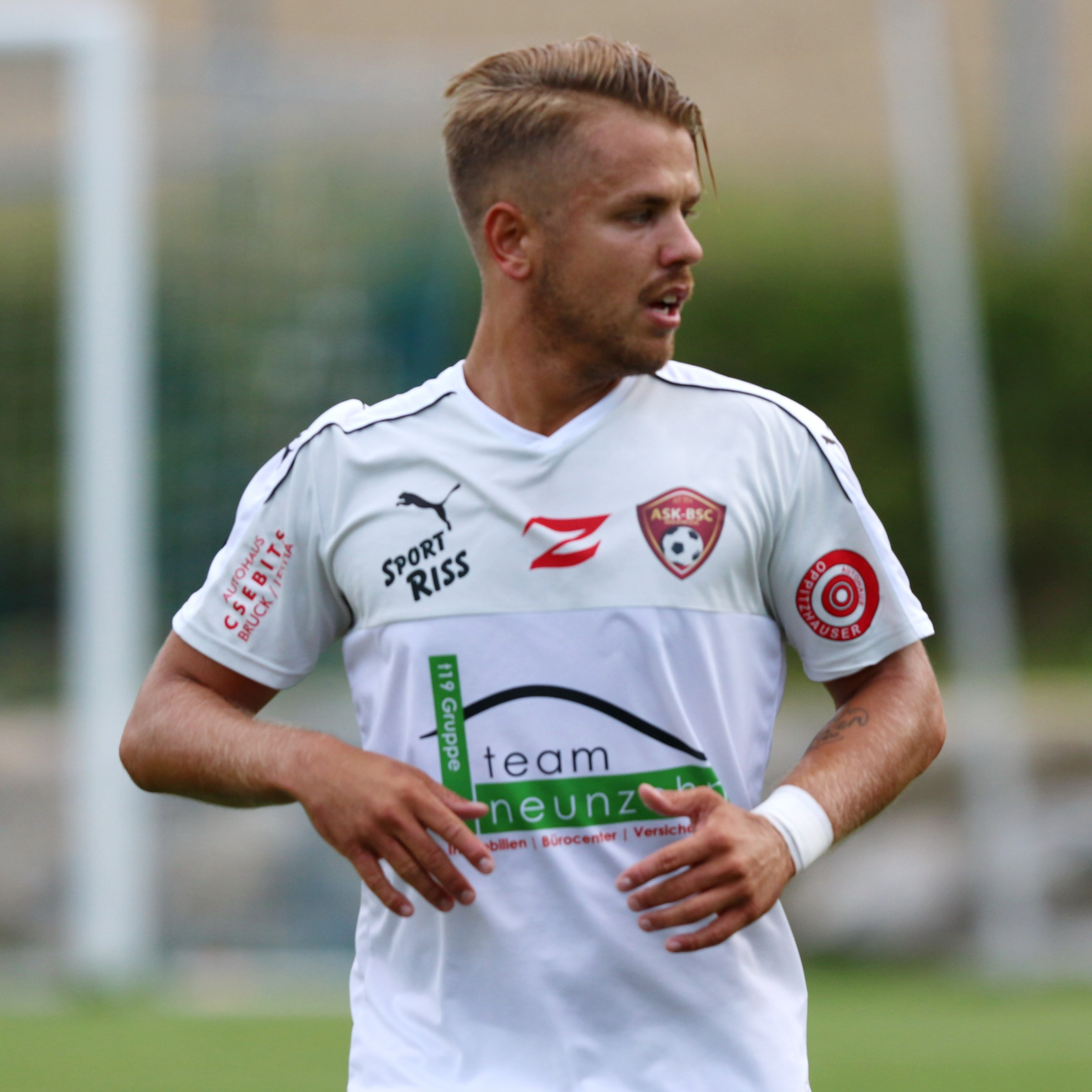
- Felix in 2017

Personal information
- Full name: René Felix
- Date of birth: 23 June 1990 (age 36)
- Place of birth: Vienna, Austria
- Height: 1.78 m (5 ft 10 in)
- Position: Forward

Youth career
- FK Austria Wien

Senior career*
Years	Team	Apps	(Gls)
2008–2009	SV Wienerberg	39	(5)
2008–2012	SC Wiener Neustadt	17	(1)
2010–2011	→ Wiener Sport-Club (loan)	13	(1)
2012–2013	FC Lustenau	21	(1)
2013	St. Pölten	13	(0)
2015	SR Donaufeld	14	(3)
2015–2016	FAC	22	(0)
- * Club domestic league appearances and goals as of 8 June 2016

René Felix (born 23 June 1990) is an Austrian footballer.
