= Jaroslav Kasprisin =

Slovak footballer

Personal information
- Date of birth: 15 March 1990 (age 36)
- Place of birth: Košice, Slovakia
- Height: 1.87 m (6 ft 1 1/2 in)
- Position: Goalkeeper

Team information
- Current team: SV Horn (goalkeeper coach)

Youth career
- Lokomotíva Košice
- 1. FC Košice
- –2004: Inter Bratislava
- 2004–2008: SV Horn

Senior career*
Years	Team	Apps	(Gls)
2008–2010	SV Horn	5	(0)
2010–2011	SV St. Gallen		
2011–2012	Schulz Academy		
2012–2016	SV Horn	17	(0)
2016–2017	ATSV Stadl-Paura	30	(0)
2017–2018	SV Horn	0	(0)
2020	SV Horn	0	(0)
- * Club domestic league appearances and goals

Jaroslav Kasprisin (born 15 March 1990) is a Slovak retired footballer. He is currently the goalkeeper coach of SV Horn.

== Career ==
=== Club career ===
Kasprisin came to Austria when he joined youth team of SV Horn in 2004 after he had previously played for FC Lokomotíva Košice, 1. FC Košice and Inter Bratislava.

In May 2008 he made his debut for Horn's first team in the Regionalliga when he came on as a substitute for Oliver Bittner on matchday 29 of the 2007/08 season against SC Neusiedl am See 1919 at half-time.

In 2010 he moved to SV St. Gallen. In 2011 he came to USA where he joined the Fort Lauderdale Schulz Academy. In January 2012 he returned to Austria for SV Horn. After Horn's promotion in the same year, he made his debut in the Austrian Football Second League in July 2013, when he was in the starting line-up against SCR Altach on the first matchday of the 2013/14 season. In 2015, the club was relegated back to the Regionalliga.

For the 2016/17 season, Kasprisin moved to ATSV Stadl-Paura. He played every game that season.

For the 2017/18 season he returned to SV Horn, helping them with promotion again to the Austrian Football Second League. After promotion, he ended his career due to an injury.

=== Coaching and later career ===
In March 2020, however, he made a comeback and returned to Horn to act as a substitute goalkeeper for the injured Sebastian Gessl behind Simon Kronsteiner until the end of the season. At this time, Kasprisin was already working for Horn, as he was a goalkeeper coach for the youth teams of the club. On 2 September 2020 the club confirmed, that Kasprisin would continue with the first team as a goalkeeper coach.
