= Rafael Moreira (disambiguation) =

Rafael Moreira is a musician.

Rafael Moreira may also refer to:

- Rafael Moreira (footballer)
- Rafael Moreira, character in 3%
