= Matej Král =

Slovak footballer

Personal information
- Full name: Matej Král
- Date of birth: 28 December 1990 (age 35)
- Place of birth: Czechoslovakia
- Height: 1.88 m (6 ft 2 in)
- Position: Midfielder

Team information
- Current team: FC Nitra
- Number: 25

Youth career
- Nitra

Senior career*
Years	Team	Apps	(Gls)
2009–	Nitra	19	(0)
2013	→ Topoľčany (loan)		
- * Club domestic league appearances and goals as of 6 September 2015

Matej Král (born 28 December 1990) is a Slovak football midfielder who currently plays for FC Nitra.
