= Jovana Zlatičanin =

Montenegrin footballer

Personal information
- Date of birth: 3 April 1990 (age 36)
- Position: Defender

Senior career*
Years	Team	Apps	(Gls)
- Ada

International career^{‡}
2014–2016	Montenegro	5	(0)
- * Club domestic league appearances and goals ‡ National team caps and goals as of 15 September 2016

Jovana Zlatičanin (born 3 April 1990) is a Montenegrin footballer who plays as a defender. She has been a member of the Montenegro women's national team.
