= Mehdi Reza =

Qatari footballer (born 1990)

Mehdi Reza مهدي رضا
Personal information
- Full name: Mehdi Reza Ahmed
- Date of birth: 10 May 1990 (age 36)
- Place of birth: Qatar
- Height: 1.83 m (6 ft 0 in)
- Position: Left back

Youth career
- Al-Khor

Senior career*
| Years | Team | Apps | (Gls) |
| 2011–2021 | Al-Khor | 29 | (1) |
| 2021–2022 | Al Bidda | | |
- * Club domestic league appearances and goals

Mehdi Reza Ahmed (Arabic:مهدي رضا أحمد) (born 10 May 1990) is a Qatari footballer. He currently plays as a left back.

== Career ==
Mehdi Reza started his career at Al-Khor and is a product of the Al-Khor's youth system. On 29 November 2013, Mehdi Reza made his professional debut for Al-Khor against Al-Ahli in the Pro League, replacing Mohammed Al-Alawi .
