= Mohammadreza Zeynalkheiri =

Iranian footballer

Personal information
- Full name: Mohammadreza Zeynalkheiri
- Date of birth: 26 January 1990
- Place of birth: Tabriz, Iran
- Position: Midfielder

Team information
- Current team: Mes Kerman

Senior career*
Years	Team	Apps	(Gls)
2010–2013	Shahrdari Tabriz	53	(3)
2013	Gostaresh Foulad	6	(0)
2013–2014	Saipa F.C.	2	(0)
2014	Naft Gachsaran	4	(0)
2014–2015	Shahrdari Ardabil	11	(0)
2015–	Mes Kerman	24	(0)
- * Club domestic league appearances and goals as of 28 July 2016

Mohammadreza Zeynalkheiri (Persian: محمدرضا زينال‌خيري) is an Iranian footballer who plays for Mes Kerman in the Azadegan League.
