= Diogo Freire =

Portuguese footballer

Personal information
- Full name: Diogo Bento Freire
- Date of birth: 30 March 1990 (age 36)
- Place of birth: Vendas Novas, Portugal
- Height: 1.90 m (6 ft 3 in)
- Position: Goalkeeper

Youth career
- 2005–2006: Vitória de Setúbal
- 2006–2009: Benfica

Senior career*
Years	Team	Apps	(Gls)
2009–2010	Odiáxere		
2010–2012	Estrela de Vendas Novas		
2012–2013	União Montemor		
2013–2015	Trofense	53	(0)
2015–2016	Desportivo das Aves	4	(0)
2016–2017	Académico de Viseu	8	(0)
2017–2018	Eléctrico	4	(0)
2018–2019	Penalva Castelo	19	(0)
2019–2020	Castro Daire	4	(0)
- * Club domestic league appearances and goals as of 6 September 2021

Diogo Bento Freire (born 30 March 1990) is a Portuguese footballer who played as goalkeeper.

== Career ==
On 1 December 2013, Freire made his professional debut with Trofense in a 2013–14 Segunda Liga match against Feirense.
