= Juremy Reker =

Dutch footballer

Juremy Reker (born 30 March 1990 in Amsterdam) is a Dutch footballer who played for Eerste Divisie club FC Eindhoven during the 2009-2010 football season.
