= Muhammed Shakhbari =

Israeli footballer

Muhammed Shakhbari محمد شحبري
Personal information
- Full name: Muhammed Shakhbari
- Date of birth: 2 January 1990 (age 36)
- Place of birth: Nazareth, Israel
- Position: Defender

Team information
- Current team: Maccabi Ahi Iksal
- Number: 6

Senior career*
Years	Team	Apps	(Gls)
2009–2018	Maccabi Ahi Nazareth	69	(1)
2013–2014	→ Ahva Arraba (loan)	24	(0)
2014	→ Maccabi Sulam Hani (loan)	2	(0)
2014–2015	→ F.C. Tzeirei Kafr Kanna (loan)	15	(0)
2016	→ Hapoel Baqa al-Gharbiyye (loan)	1	(0)
2016–2017	→ Hapoel Kafr Kanna (loan)	17	(0)
2017	→ Maccabi Ironi Kiryat Ata (loan)	5	(0)
2017–2018	→ Maccabi Ahi Iksal (loan)	22	(1)
2018–2019	F.C. al-Nahda Nazareth	28	(1)
2019	Hapoel Asi Gilboa	2	(0)
2019–2020	Hapoel F.C. Sandala Gilboa	16	(0)
2020	Shimshno Bnei Tayibe	4	(0)
2020–2021	Hapoel F.C. Sandala Gilboa	22	(0)
- * Club domestic league appearances and goals

Muhammed Shakhbari (Arabic: محمد شحبري, Hebrew: מוחמד שחברי; born 2 January 1990) is an Israeli footballer.
