= Artem Shelestynskyi =

Ukrainian footballer

Personal information
- Full name: Artem Serhiyovych Shelestynskyi
- Date of birth: 16 October 1990 (age 36)
- Place of birth: Ukrainian SSR
- Height: 1.77 m (5 ft 10 in)
- Position: Midfielder

Youth career
- 2003–2007: FC Stal Alchevsk

Senior career*
Years	Team	Apps	(Gls)
2008–2009	FC Stal Alchevsk	17	(0)
- * Club domestic league appearances and goals as of 23 March 2010

Artem Serhiyovych Shelestynskyi (Ukrainian: Артем Сергійович Шелестинський; born 17 October 1990) is a Ukrainian professional footballer. After leaving Stal Alchevsk, he has been playing for amateur clubs for a decade.
