= Amando Aust =

Gambian footballer

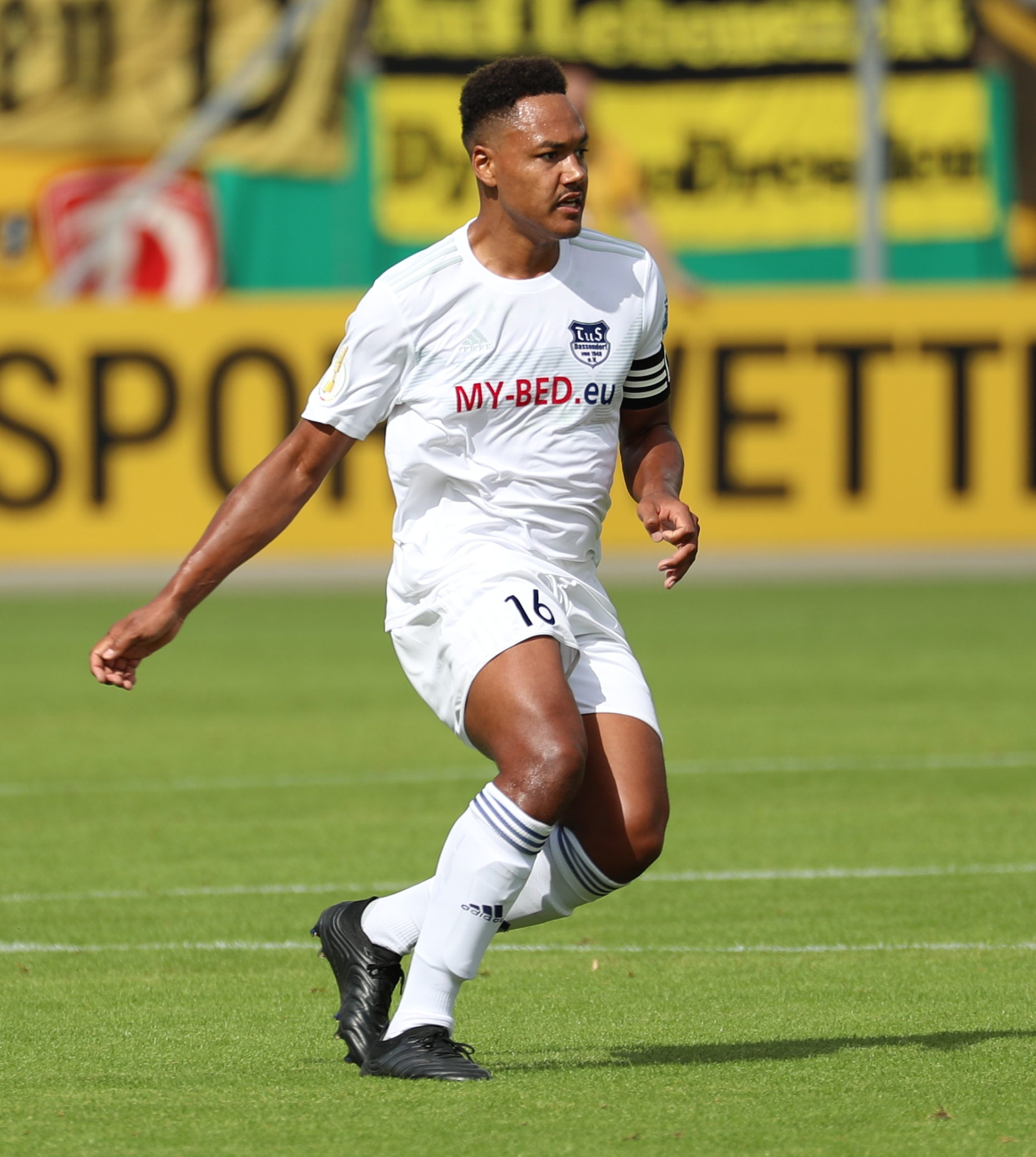
- Aust with TuS Dassendorf in 2019

Personal information
- Full name: Amando Joseph Aust
- Date of birth: 23 April 1990 (age 36)
- Place of birth: Berlin, Germany
- Height: 1.90 m (6 ft 3 in)
- Position: Centre-back

Senior career*
Years	Team	Apps	(Gls)
2009–2011	OSC Vellmar	55	(1)
2010–2013	Holstein Kiel II	45	(4)
2012–2013	Holstein Kiel	16	(2)
2013–2014	VfR Neumünster	18	(3)
2014–2015	TSG Neustrelitz	8	(0)
2015–2023	TuS Dassendorf	201	(19)

International career
2017	Gambia	1	(0)
- * Club domestic league appearances and goals as of 08:20, 25 August 2023 (UTC)

Amando Joseph Aust (born 23 April 1990), better known as Amando, is a professional footballer who most recently played as a centre-back for TuS Dassendorf and the Gambia national football team.

== International career ==
Aust was born in Germany and is of Gambian descent. He was called up to the Gambia national football team for a pair of international friendlies against Morocco U20s and Central African Republic in March 2017. He made his international debut in a 2–1 friendly win over the Central African Republic on 27 March 2017.
