= Roberto (footballer, born January 1990) =

Brazilian footballer

Personal information
- Full name: Roberto Gomes Júnior
- Date of birth: 29 January 1990 (age 36)
- Place of birth: Cornélio Procópio, Brazil
- Height: 1.85 m (6 ft 1 in)
- Position: Goalkeeper

Youth career
- –2009: Goiás

Senior career*
Years	Team	Apps	(Gls)
2010	Goiás		
2010–2014	Atlético Goianiense		
- * Club domestic league appearances and goals

Roberto Gomes Júnior (born 29 January 1990), known as just Roberto, is a Brazilian footballer who plays as a goalkeeper.
