= Lenin Porozo =

Ecuadorian footballer (born 1990)

Personal information
- Full name: Lenin Guillermo Porozo Quintero
- Date of birth: July 17, 1990 (age 36)
- Place of birth: Guayaquil, Ecuador
- Position: Midfielder

Team information
- Current team: El Nacional

Youth career
- 2007–2009: Barcelona SC

Senior career*
Years	Team	Apps	(Gls)
2007–2010	Barcelona SC	6	(0)
2010–2011	ESPOLI	26	(0)
2012–2013	Independiente del Valle	38	(0)
2014–	El Nacional	14	(1)
- * Club domestic league appearances and goals as of 30 May 2014

Lenin Guillermo Porozo Quintero (born July 7, 1990) is an Ecuadorian footballer currently playing for El Nacional. He plays as a midfielder for his club.

== Club career ==
Porozo came out as a professional at Barcelona SC. Porozo's first start in the major was in April 2007, he then again made another aparences in February 2008. Recently the new head coach of Barcelona, Juan Manuel Llop requested his presence this year.
