= Klaus Mertens (artist) =

German contemporary artist

Klaus Mertens (born 1950 in Bonn) is a German contemporary artist. He is currently residing in Berlin and Addis Ababa.

== Background ==
Mertens studied and worked within the field of architecture in the 1970s. In 1984 he studied fine arts at the Berlin University of the Arts under Georg Baselitz, and graduated in 1991 with a master's degree. Having been attracted by African culture and art, he travelled to Ethiopia for the first time in 2007, and started teaching at Addis Ababa University in 2010. While teaching there, he founded a new class for lithography.

== Career ==
In his early career, Klaus Mertens created a series of large woodcuts he called “Woodcut Tattoos”.

Mertens’ “Social Prints” works show images such as landscapes and portraits, combining elements of pop art and traditional woodcarving. When he moved to Ethiopia, Mertens' artwork expanded to sculpturing, photography and design. There, he started creating three-dimensional sculptures. Using materials such as plastic bags, branches, bones or animal skulls, he created several pieces of art, including Fashion Racks (2008), Jungle Fighter (2009), Knitted Egg (2014), True to Nature (2015), Global Suit (2015), and Hypoxylon Addis (2015).

His 2012 exhibition "Big Pretenders, Trophies and a Drunken Donkey" at the Asni Gallery in Addis Ababa was a reflection of the human behavior of wasting nature or hunting for trophies, practiced all over the African continent.

Since 2010, Mertens has created sculptures that can be used as furniture as well, following the tradition of artists like Richard Artschwager or Ron Aaron.

In 2013, Mertens established a partnership between the ASFAD and the Dresden Academy of Fine Arts. He coordinates an exchange program between both academies.

== Selected exhibitions ==
Solo shows:

- 2016 - Lela Gallery, Addis Ababa
- 2015 - Alliance Ethio Francaise, Addis Ababa
- 2012 - Asni Gallery, Addis Ababa
- 2011 - Alliance Ethio Francaise, Addis Ababa
- 2010 - German House, Addis Ababa
- 2009 - Commerzbank Representative Office, Addis Abeba
- 2008 - Showroom, Addis Ababa. Addis Ababa School of Fine Art & Design. Lela Galery, Addis Ababa.
- 2007 - Gallery Molitoris, Hamburg
- 2006 - Management Consultant Cap Gemini, Berlin
- 2005 - Gallery Kunstraum Haerten, Tübingen
- 2003 - Gallery Molitoris, Hamburg
- 2002 - Gallery Tammen und Busch, Berlin. Gallery im Amtshof, Feldkirchen, Austria.
- 2000 - Kunstverein mittleres Kinzigtal, Stadt Wolfach, Germany. Kunstraum Wedding, „Körperbilder“, Berlin.
- 1998 - Galerie im Prater, Berlin. Visolux Electronic GmbH, Berlin
- 1997 - Galerie Papist und Beyenburg, Köln
- 1996 - Dirty-Windows-Gallery, Berlin
- 1995 - Preisträger Kunst am Bau Villach, Austria
- 1994 - Galerie Slama, Klagenfurt, Austria. Galerie Studio 2, Köln. Allianz Generalagentur, Berlin.
- 1993 - Galerie Röller/Ravens, Berlin
- 1991 - Wintergarten im Literaturhaus, Berlin. Selbsthilfegalerie Crellestraße, Berlin.
- 1989 - Centro d'àrte ecultura di Sermoneta, Latina, Italy
- 1988 - Galerie Vinzenz Sala, Berlin
- 1987 - Galerie Roland Schneider, Berlin

Group shows

- 2019 - Mikser Festival, Dorćol, Belgrade, Serbia
- 2016 - Projektraum Kunstquartier Bethanien, Berlin
- 2015 - Millerntor Gallery, Hamburg
- 2013 - National Museum of Ethiopia, Addis Ababa
- 2012 - Laphto Art Gallery, Addis Ababa
- 2011 - Atelier Gallery, Addis Ababa
- 2008 - Lela Gallery, Addis Ababa
- 2006 - “Hochdruckzone”, Städtische Galerie Reutlingen. Galerie Tammen, Berlin. Kunstraum Haerten, Tübingen. „Neue Hozschnitte der XYLON“, Spendhaus Reutlingen. Gewerbemuseum Winterthur. Zentrum für moderne Kunst St.Pölten. Neue sächsische Galerie Chemnitz. Galerie Schwartzsche Villa, Berlin. Galerie Tammen und Busch, Berlin. Galerie Papist & Beyenburg, Köln. Galerie Johnson und Johnson, „Zeitriss“ Berlin.
- 1995 - Museum für Zeitgenössische Kunst, Mantova, Italy
- 1994 - Kultur am Nauener Platz, „Heimat Geld“, Berlin
- 1992 - Alte Essig-und Senffabrik Neukölln, Berlin. Galerie Lebendiges Museum
- 1988 - Kunstverein Niebüll
- 1989 - Künstlerbahnhof Westend, Berlin

Collections:

- Sammlung Willy Brandt Haus, Berlin
- Sammling Investitionsbank Berlin
- Artothek NBK, Berlin

== Books ==
- ato klaus: "Branches & Bones", ISBN 978-3-00-052537-7
