= W. Mertens =

Flemish still-life painter (fl. 17th century

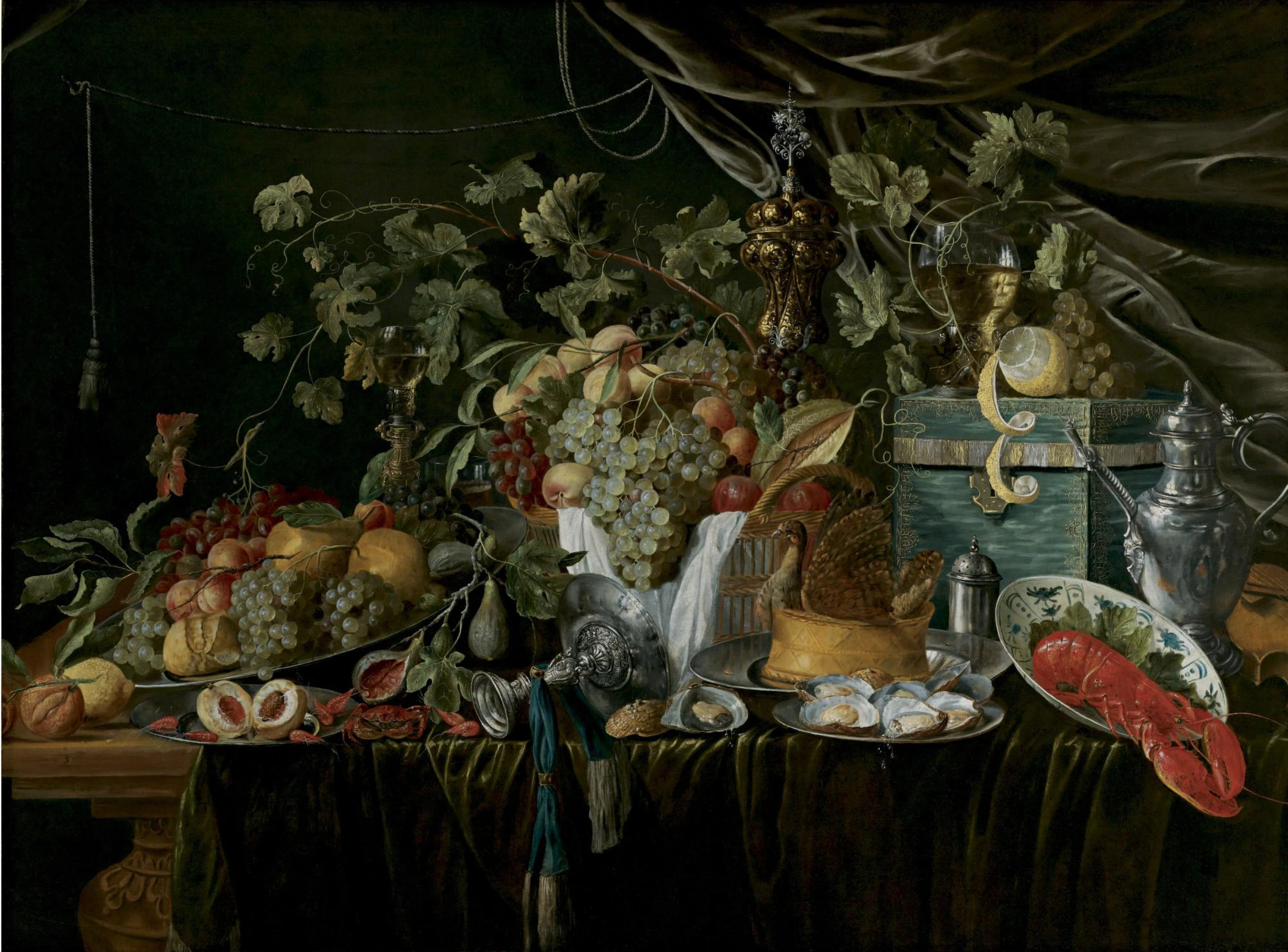
Grapes, pears, quinces, peaches, prawns, oysters and a pastry on pewter plates with other items on a table

W. Mertens, known also as Wouter Mertens (fl. 1650 – 1675) was a Flemish still-life painter, active in Antwerp who is known for his fruit still lifes and pronkstillevens. His work shows the influence of Jan Davidszoon de Heem, a Dutch still-life painter who was active in Antwerp from the mid-1630s.

== Life ==
Nothing is known about the life of Mertens other than that he was likely active in Antwerp in the third quarter of the 17th century.

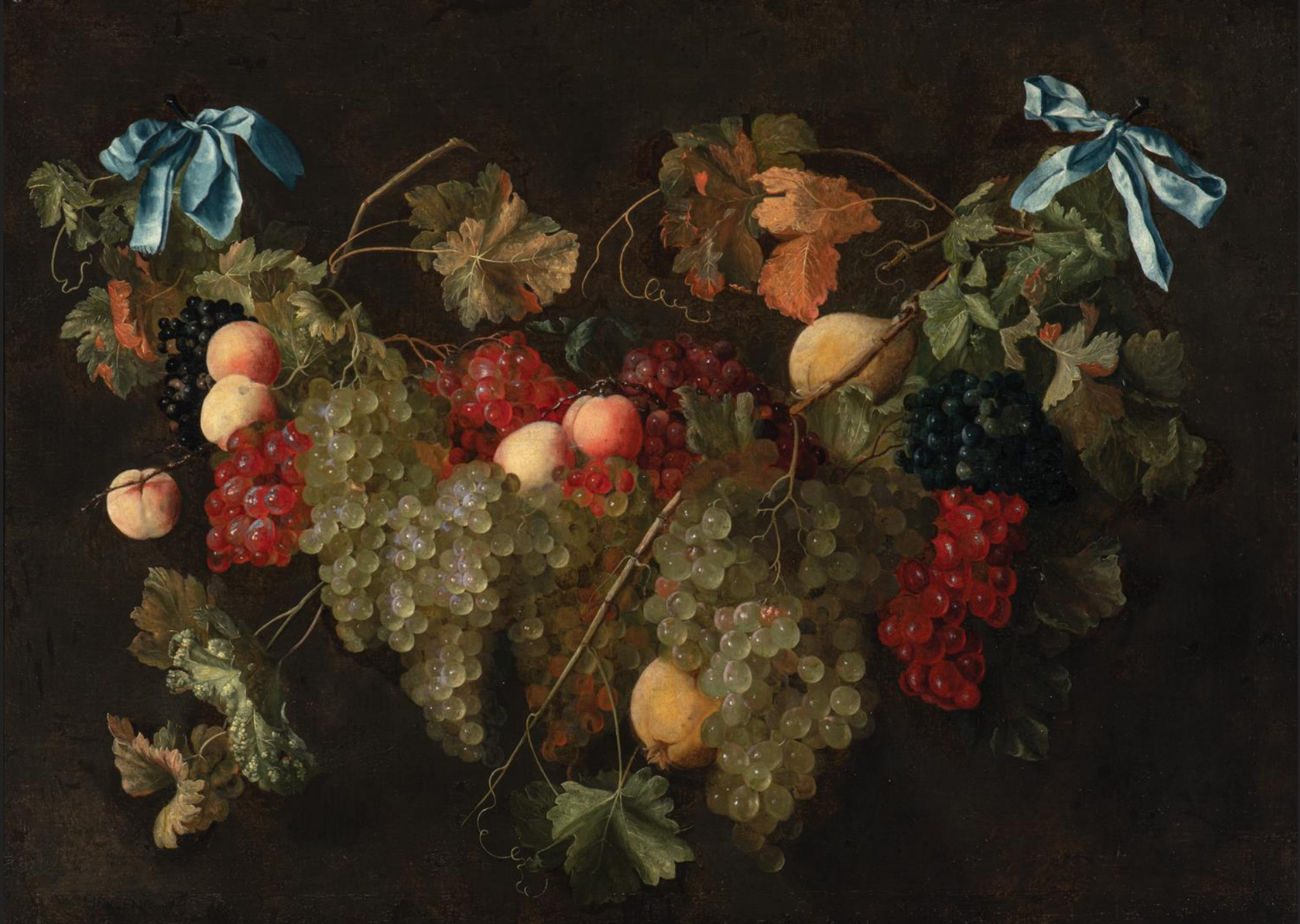
Garland of Fruit

While a Wouter Mertens was registered as a wijnmeester (son of a master) in the Guild of Saint Luke of Antwerp in the guild year 1641–1642, this person was a borduerwerker, i.e., an embroidery worker. This person is, therefore, unlikely the same person as W. Mertens. While some works are signed as 'W. Mertens' or show remains of a signature which indicate that his first name started with a W, there is no full signature that shows his first name as 'Wouter'. This first name seems to have been attributed to the artist based on confusion with the Wouter Mertens registered as an embroidery worker.

As it would be unlikely for a painter to be active in Antwerp without registering at the local guild, some art historians have hypothesized that the artist should be identified with the Antwerp painter and art dealer Cornelis Mertens. Cornelis Mertens was registered with the Guild of Antwerp as a painting apprentice in the guild year 1644–45 studying under Abraham Matthyssen. He was recorded as a master in the guild year 1656–57. Cornelis was last recorded in the guild records in 1692–93 when the death debt of his wife was paid. The dates of the works ascribed to W. Mertens coincide with the active period of Cornelis Mertens. However, there is no plausible explanation for why Cornelis would sign his works with the initial W instead of C. It is still possible that the artist was related to Cornelis Mertens or that artist's son, Thomas Mertens.

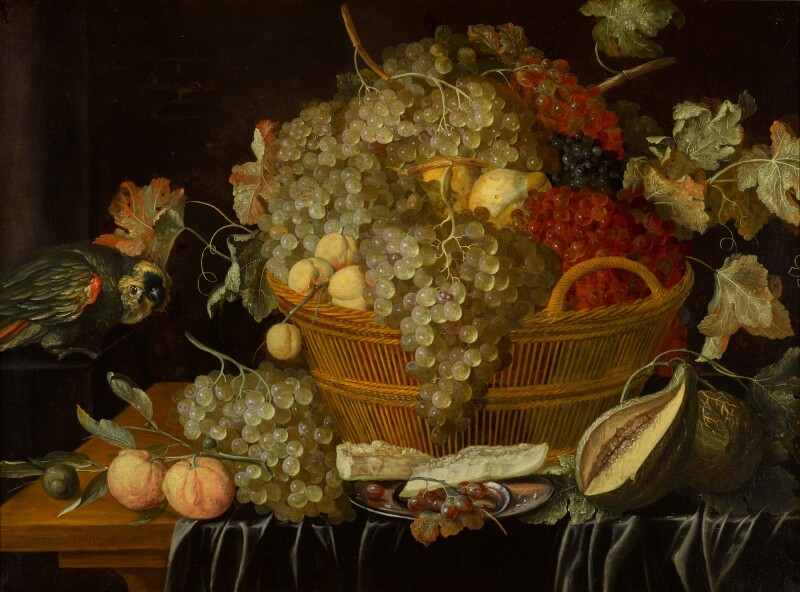
Still life with grapes in a wicker basket, together with a parrot

== Work ==
Only a handful works have been attributed to W. Mertens, some of which are signed as W. Mertens. None of the works are dated. Mertens was a specialist still-life painter who is known for his fruit still lifes and pronkstillevens (i.e., sumptuous still lifes of luxurious objects).

In terms of composition and choice of motifs, his work shows a knowledge of the early-1650s works of Jan Davidszoon de Heem, a Dutch still-life painter who was active in Antwerp from the mid-1630s. His works are sometimes attributed to other Antwerp painters who were influenced by de Heem, including Joris van Son, Jan Pauwel Gillemans the Elder and Thomas Mertens.
