= Kráľ =

Village and municipality in Slovakia

Kráľ Sajószentkirály
- Municipality
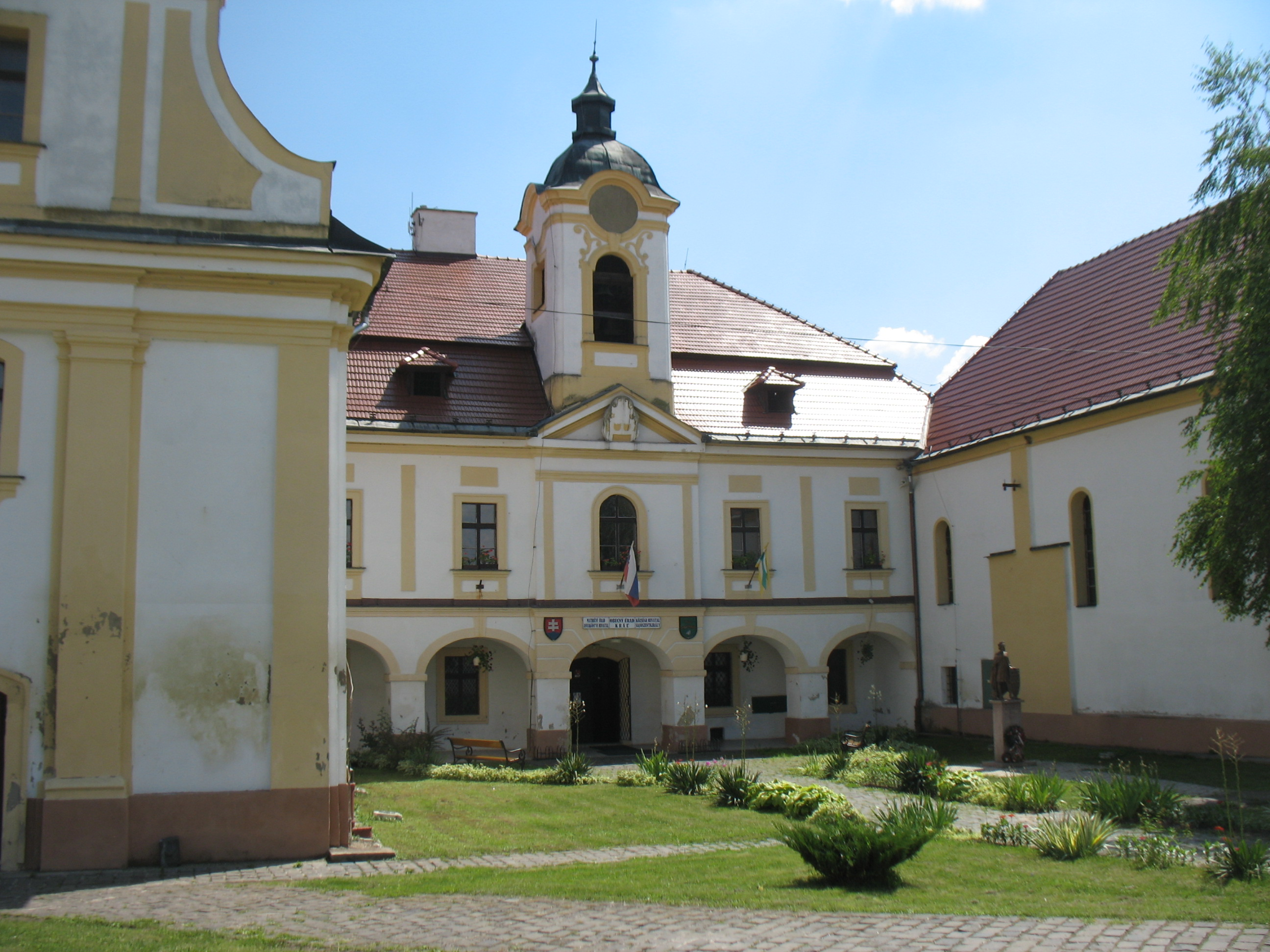

- Flag

- Location of Kráľ in the Banská Bystrica Region Location of Kráľ in Slovakia
- Coordinates: 48.33°N 20.34°E
- Country: Slovakia
- Region: Banská Bystrica Region
- District: Rimavská Sobota District
- First mentioned: 1282

Government
  - Mayor: Ferenc Béres (Szövetség-Aliancia)

Area
  - Total: 11.07 km^{2} (4.27 sq mi)
- Elevation: 169 m (554 ft)

Population (2025)
  - Total: 930
- Time zone: UTC+1 (CET)
  - Summer (DST): UTC+2 (CEST)
- Postal code: 980 45
- Area code: +421 47
- Vehicle registration plate (until 2022): RS
- Website: www.obec-kral.sk

Kráľ (Hungarian: Sajószentkirály) is a village and municipality in the Rimavská Sobota District of the Banská Bystrica Region of southern Slovakia.

== Geography ==
The municipality lies at an altitude of 169 metres (554 ft) and covers an area of 11.07 km^{2} (4.27 sq mi) (2025).

== Population ==
Population statistic (10 years)
Year	1995	2005	2015	2025
Count	932	935	967	930
Difference		+0.32%	+3.42%	−3.82%

Population statistic
Year	2024	2025
Count	932	930
Difference		−0.21%

It has a population of 930 people (31 December 2025).

=== Ethnicity ===
Census 2021 (1+ %)
Ethnicity	Number	Fraction
Hungarian	642	68.88%
Romani	243	26.07%
Slovak	213	22.85%
Not found out	13	1.39%
Total	932	

In year 2021 was 932 people by ethnicity 642 as Hungarian, 243 as Romani, 213 as Slovak, 13 as Not found out, 3 as Czech and 1 as Polish.

Note on population: The difference values of population numbers in the table "Population statistic" and in the sections "Ethnicity" & "Religion" is caused by the use of various statistical methods.

=== Religion ===
Census 2021 (1+ %)
Religion	Number	Fraction
Roman Catholic Church	590	63.3%
Evangelical Church	112	12.02%
None	107	11.48%
Calvinist Church	84	9.01%
Not found out	22	2.36%
Total	932	

In year 2021 was 932 people by religion 590 from Roman Catholic Church, 112 from Evangelical Church, 107 from None, 84 from Calvinist Church, 22 from Not found out, 6 from Greek Catholic Church, 6 from Apostolic Church, 2 from Jehovah's Witnesses, 1 from Eastern Orthodox Church, 1 from Other and not ascertained christian church and 1 from United Methodist Church.

== Genealogical resources ==
The records for genealogical research are available at the state archive "Statny Archiv in Banska Bystrica,

Slovakia"

- Lutheran church records (births/marriages/deaths): 1730-1895 (parish B)
- Reformated church records (births/marriages/deaths): 1778-1899 (parish B)

== See also ==
- List of municipalities and towns in Slovakia
