= Mauricio Arroyo =

Colombian footballer (born 1990)

Personal information
- Full name: Mauricio José Arroyo Bertel
- Date of birth: September 18, 1990 (age 36)
- Place of birth: Bogotá, Colombia
- Height: 1.77 m (5 ft 10 in)
- Position: Central midfielder

Team information
- Current team: Independiente Medellín

Youth career
- Real Cartagena

Senior career*
Years	Team	Apps	(Gls)
2006–2009	Real Cartagena		
2010	Gimnàstic	2	(0)
2010–2011	Real Cartagena	15	(0)
2012–	Independiente Medellín		
- * Club domestic league appearances and goals

Mauricio José Arroyo Bertel (born September 18, 1990) is a Colombian central midfielder who currently plays for Independiente Medellín.

Debuting at the for Real Cartagena his play saw him bench more experienced strikers and a place on the Colombia national under-20 football team (2007–2009) where he was once the captain after a great showing in a Youth tournament in Spain where he out shined many of the more know players playing abroad. After helping Real Cartagena get in position to be promoted into the Copa Mustang, has helped him get a call up to the full Colombia national football team where he will debut at the age of 18 on November 19 against Nigeria.
