= Sebastian Gessl =

Austrian soccer goalkeeper

Personal information
- Date of birth: 30 June 1996 (age 30)
- Place of birth: Austria
- Position: Goalkeeper

Team information
- Current team: Horn

Youth career
- Hollabrunn
- Rapid Wien
- 2014–2015: Karlsruher SC

Senior career*
Years	Team	Apps	(Gls)
2011–2013	Rapid Wien II	0	(0)
2014–2017	Karlsruher SC II	33	(0)
2018–2019	1899 Hoffenheim II	9	(0)
2019–	SV Horn	16	(0)
- * Club domestic league appearances and goals

Sebastian Gessl (born 30 June 1996) is an Austrian footballer.

== Career ==
In 2006, Gessl joined the youth academy of Rapid Wien, Austria's most successful club.

In 2014, he signed for Karlsruher SC II in the German fifth division.

In 2018, he trialed with Scottish side Aberdeen.

In 2019, Gessl signed for Horn in the Austrian second division from the reserves of German Bundesliga team 1899 Hoffenheim.
