= Thomas Mertens =

Flemish still life painter

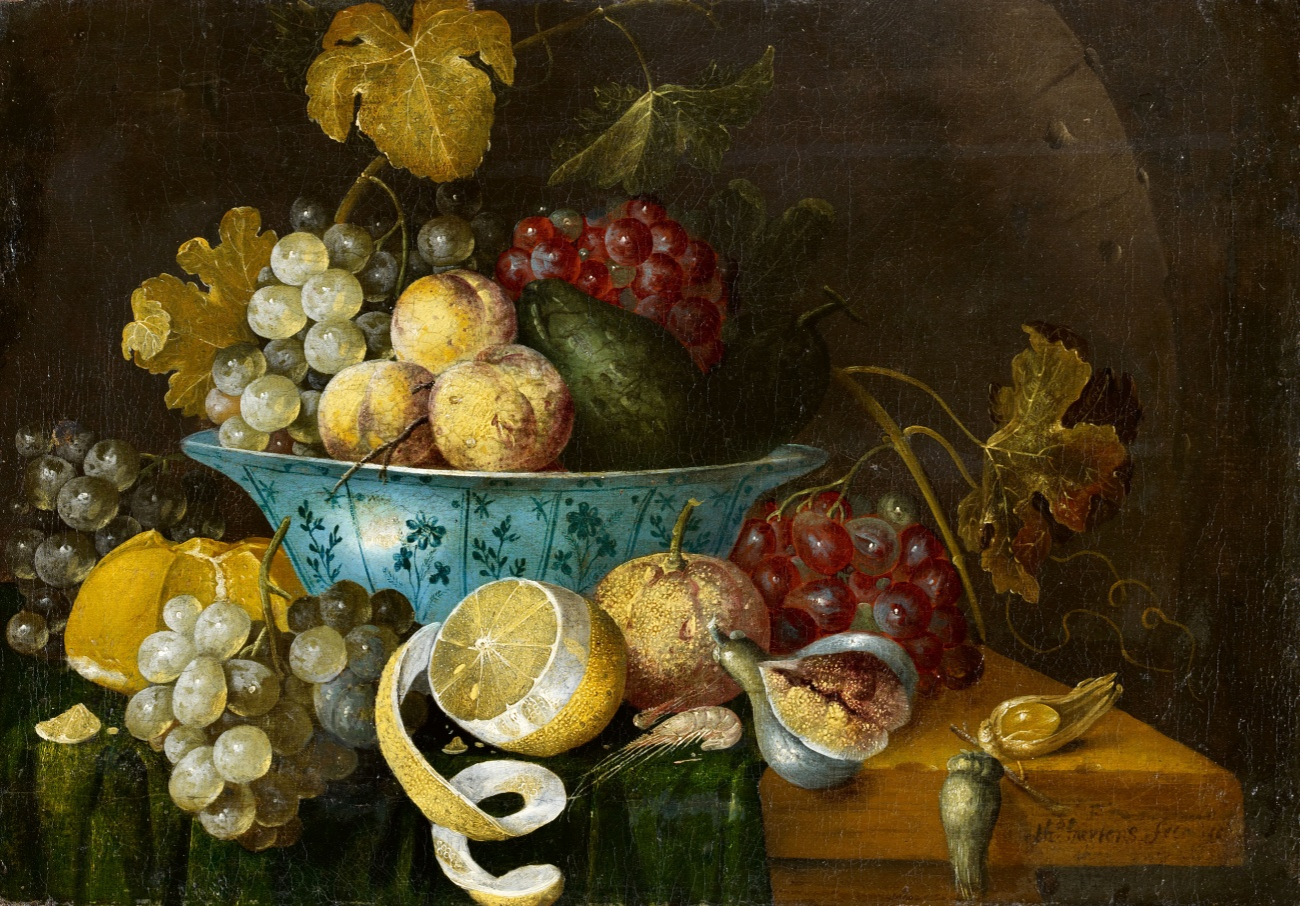
Still life with a Wan-Li dish, fruit and bread

Thomas Mertens or Thomas Merens (fl. 1666–1669) was a Flemish still life painter active in Antwerp who is known for his fruit still lifes and pronkstillevens.

== Life ==
Little is known about the life of Mertens other than that he was born in Antwerp as the son of the still life painter Cornelis. He is believed to have trained with his father. The artist was active in Antwerp in the second part of the 1660s.

The place and date of his death are unknown. The last record on him is his registration as a master of the Antwerp Guild of St. Luke in the guild year 1669/1679.

== Work ==
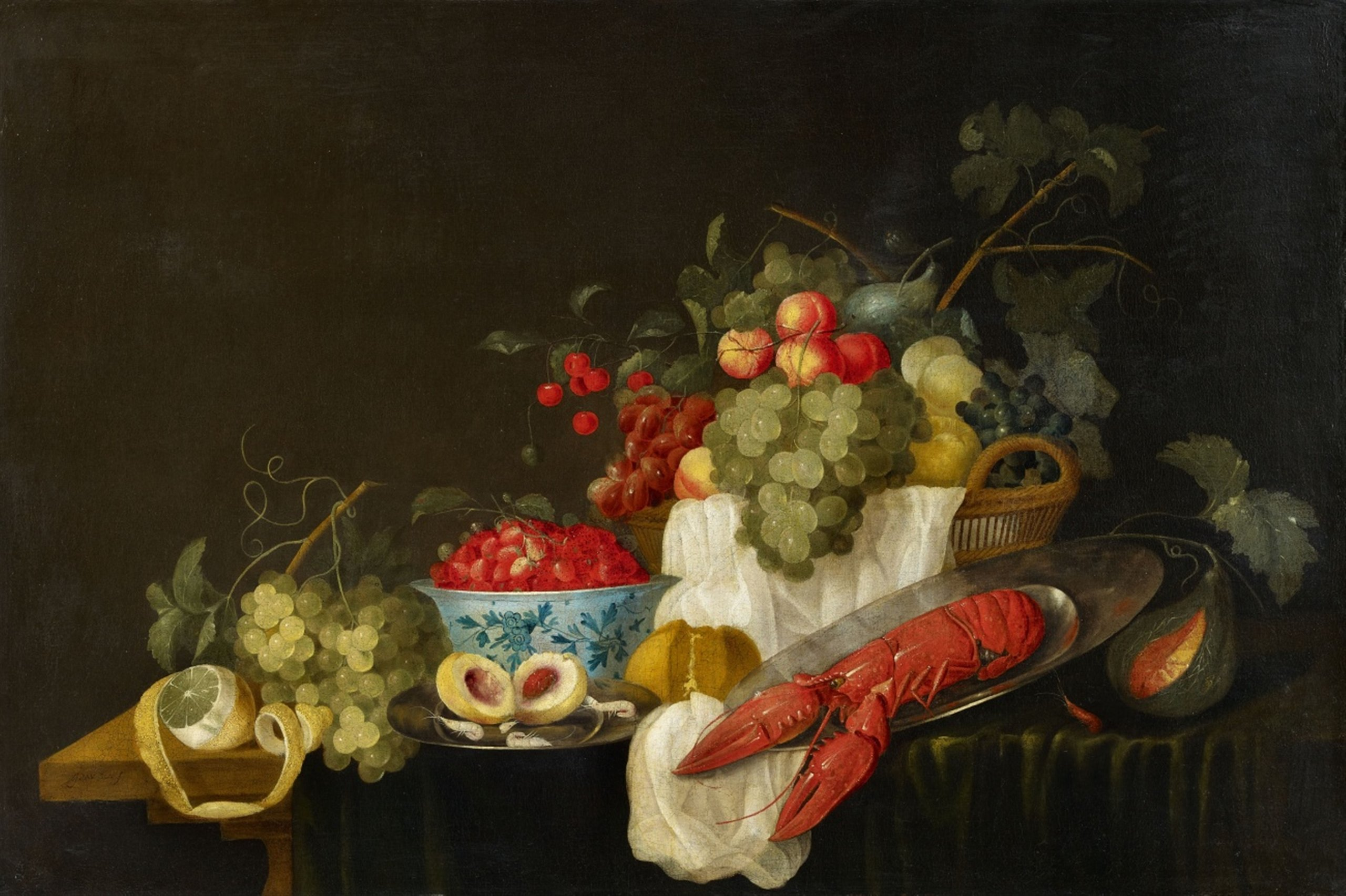
Opulent still life with fruit and a lobster

Mertens was only rediscovered in 1994. His known work is limited and only a few signed works are known. A work entitled Still life with fruit and oysters on a table dated 1666 (At Sotheby's New York, 22 April 2015, lot 11) indicates that his career should be situated in the latter half of the 1660s. Mertens was a specialist still life painter who is known for his fruit still lifes and pronkstillevens (i.e. sumptuous still lifes of luxurious objects).

In terms of composition and choice of motifs his work shows the influence of Jan Davidszoon de Heem, a Dutch still life painter who was active in Antwerp from the mid-1630s. He even produced copies of the work of de Heem. Another artist who influenced Mertens was Joris van Son, whose technique and preference for smooth finishes he shared. His work is further similar to that of other artists who were influenced by de Heem such as W. Mertens with whom he may have been related.

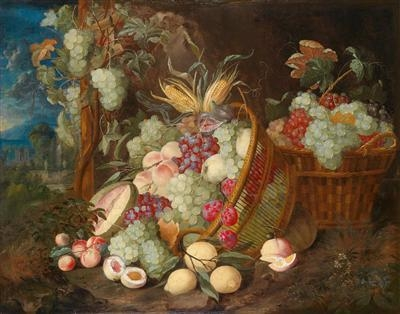
Still life of grapes, lemons, peaches, figs and a melon
