= Francisco Ubiera =

Dominican footballer

Personal information
- Date of birth: 21 August 1990 (age 36)
- Place of birth: La Romana, Dominican Republic
- Position: Defender

College career
| Years | Team | Apps | (Gls) |
| 2009 | Florida Gulf Coast Eagles | 0 | (0) |
| 2010–2013 | Florida Tech Panthers | 40 | (1) |

Senior career*
| Years | Team | Apps | (Gls) |
| 2014 | Romana FC | | |
| 2015 | Tampa Marauders | | |

International career^{‡}
| 2011– | Dominican Republic | 7 | (0) |
- * Club domestic league appearances and goals as of 14 August 2013 ‡ National team caps and goals as of 14 August 2013

Francisco Ubiera (born 21 August 1990) is a Dominican international footballer who plays as a defender.

== Career ==
Ubiera has played college soccer for the Florida Gulf Coast University and the Florida Institute of Technology.

He made his international debut for Dominican Republic in 2011, and has appeared in FIFA World Cup qualifying matches.
