= Narmina Mammadova =

Azerbaijani footballer (born 1990)

Personal information
- Date of birth: 15 February 1990 (age 36)
- Place of birth: Baku, Azerbaijan SSR, Soviet Union
- Position: Forward

Senior career*
Years	Team	Apps	(Gls)
- Ruslan-93

International career^{‡}
2006	Azerbaijan U19	1	(0)
2010	Azerbaijan	5	(0)
- * Club domestic league appearances and goals ‡ National team caps and goals as of 25 August 2010

Narmina Mammadova (Azerbaijani: Nərminə Məmmədova; born 15 February 1990) is an Azerbaijani former footballer who played as a forward. She has been a member of the Azerbaijan women's national team.
