= Santos Navarro =

Bolivian footballer (born 1990)

Personal information
- Full name: Santos Rodrigo Navarro Arteaga
- Date of birth: November 20, 1990 (age 35)
- Place of birth: Santa Cruz de la Sierra, Bolivia
- Height: 1.68 m (5 ft 6 in)
- Position: Midfielder

Team information
- Current team: Real Potosí
- Number: 27

Youth career
- 1999–2009: Tahuichi Academy

Senior career*
Years	Team	Apps	(Gls)
2010–2012	Blooming	44	(2)
2012–2013	Real Potosí	16	(1)
2015	Sport Boys	8	(0)
- * Club domestic league appearances and goals as of March 11, 2012

Santos Rodrigo Navarro Arteaga (born November 20, 1990, in Santa Cruz de la Sierra) is a Bolivian football midfielder who most recently played for Sport Boys.

== Club career ==
Navarro developed his football career at the Tahuichi Academy. During the 2010 winter transfer window he was signed by professional club Blooming. He made his debut with the celestes on August 1 against San José in Oruro.
