= Ana Viegas =

Portuguese footballer

Personal information
- Date of birth: 14 September 1990 (age 36)
- Position: Midfielder

International career^{‡}
Years	Team	Apps	(Gls)
- Portugal
- ‡ National team caps and goals as of 19:47, 30 August 2019 (UTC)

Ana Viegas (born 14 September 1990) is a Portuguese footballer who plays as a midfielder and has appeared for the Portugal women's national team.

== Career ==
Viegas has been capped for the Portugal national team, appearing for the team during the 2019 FIFA Women's World Cup qualifying cycle.
