= Žan Cankar =

Slovenian footballer

Personal information
- Full name: Žan Cankar
- Date of birth: 13 November 1990 (age 35)
- Place of birth: Ljubljana, SFR Yugoslavia
- Height: 1.78 m (5 ft 10 in)
- Position: Right-back

Team information
- Current team: Kresnice

Youth career
- –2005: Olimpija
- 2005–2009: Interblock

Senior career*
Years	Team	Apps	(Gls)
2009–2011	Interblock	25	(0)
2009	→ Ivančna Gorica (loan)	4	(1)
2011–2012	Krka	14	(1)
2013–2015	Radomlje	55	(3)
2015–2016	SG Drautal	18	(2)
2016-2020	Kresnice		
2020	SV Tainach	9	(1)
2021	SV Skt Margarethen/Rosental	10	(2)
2022	ASKÖ Dellach/Drau	5	(0)
2023-	Kresnice		

International career
2006–2007	Slovenia U17	5	(0)
2008	Slovenia U18	2	(0)
- * Club domestic league appearances and goals as of 27 May 2015

Žan Cankar (born 13 November 1990) is a footballer from Slovenia.

== Career ==
Cankar has played for SG Drautal and other Austrian lower league clubs. He returned to Slovenia in February 2023 to play for 4th-tier side Kresnice.
