= Al Naem Mohamed Osman Al Noor =

Sudanese footballer

Elnaeim Mohamed Osman
Personal information
- Full name: Elnaeim Mohamed Osman Elnour
- Date of birth: 1990 (age 35–36)
- Place of birth: Al Kamlin, Eljazira State, Sudan
- Height: 1.74 m (5 ft 8 1/2 in)
- Position: Midfielder

Team information
- Current team: El-Esma FC (Al Kamlin)
- Number: 8

Senior career*
Years	Team	Apps	(Gls)
2006-2007	Al-Sahafa SC (Khartoum)		
2008-2011	Al-Hilal Club		
2012-2016	Al-Ahly Shendi		
2016	Al-Nil SC (Shendi) (loan)		
2017-2018	Wad Hashim SC (Sennar)		
2018-	El-Esma FC (Al Kamlin)		

International career
2010	Sudan U20	2	(0)
2011-	Sudan	1	(0)
- * Club domestic league appearances and goals

Elnaeim Mohamed Osman Elnour is a Sudanese footballer who plays for Al-Ahli Shendi in the Sudan Premier League. He plays as winger. He was a member of the Sudan national team at the 2011 Pan Arab Games.
