= Diego Maia =

Brazilian footballer (born 1990)

Personal information
- Full name: Diego Lopes da Silva Maia
- Date of birth: 3 February 1990 (age 36)
- Place of birth: Rio de Janeiro, Brazil
- Height: 1.82 m (5 ft 11 1/2 in)
- Position: Defender

Team information
- Current team: Sertãozinho

Senior career*
Years	Team	Apps	(Gls)
2006–2012	Remo	?	(?)
2012–2014	Ceres	?	(?)
2014	Tupi	?	(?)
2014–2015	Alecrim	0	(0)
2015	Globo	2	(0)
2016–2020	Portuguesa (RJ)	19	(0)
2018	→ Volta Redonda (loan)	17	(0)
2020–	Sertãozinho	0	(0)
- * Club domestic league appearances and goals as of 1 December 2020

Diego Lopes da Silva Maia or Diego Maia (born 3 February 1990) is a Brazilian football defender.

== Career ==
Diego Maia signed for Tupi Football Club in January 2014. Diego Maia joined Associação Atlética Portuguesa (RJ) in 2016, and has appeared in over 100 competitive matches for the club.
