= Gvantsa Dolidze =

Georgian association footballer

Personal information
- Date of birth: 1 January 1990 (age 36)
- Position: Midfielder

Senior career*
Years	Team	Apps	(Gls)
- Norchi Dinamoeli

International career^{‡}
2008	Georgia U19	2	(0)
2009–2010	Georgia	6	(0)
- * Club domestic league appearances and goals ‡ National team caps and goals as of 8 March 2011

Gvantsa Dolidze (Georgian: გვანცა დოლიძე; born 1 January 1990) is a Georgian footballer who plays as a midfielder. She has been a member of the Georgia women's national team.

== International career ==
Dolidze capped for Georgia at senior level during the 2011 FIFA Women's World Cup qualification – UEFA Group 3.
