= Arthur Pembleton =

English footballer

Personal information
- Full name: Arthur Pembleton
- Date of birth: 25 January 1895
- Place of birth: Palterton, England
- Date of death: 1976 (aged 80–81)
- Position: Wing half

Senior career*
Years	Team	Apps	(Gls)
1913–1914	Woodhouse Exchange		
1914–1918	Mansfield Mechanics		
1918–1919	Woodhouse Exchange		
1919–1922	Notts County	71	(0)
1922–1927	Millwall	127	(0)
1927–1928	Norwich City	18	(0)
Total		216	(0)
- * Club domestic league appearances and goals

Arthur Pembleton (25 January 1895 – 1976) was an English footballer who played in the Football League for Millwall, Norwich City and Notts County.
