= Exaucé Mayombo =

German-Congolese footballer

Personal information
- Full name: Exaucé Mayombo
- Date of birth: 23 August 1990 (age 36)
- Place of birth: Berlin, Germany
- Height: 1.88 m (6 ft 2 in)
- Position: Forward

Youth career
- –2006: SV Tasmania-Gropiusstadt 1973
- 2006–2008: VfL Wolfsburg
- 2008: Tennis Borussia Berlin
- 2008–2009: FC Carl Zeiss Jena

Senior career*
Years	Team	Apps	(Gls)
2009–2011	FC Carl Zeiss Jena	22	(2)
2009–2011	FC Carl Zeiss Jena II	37	(20)
2011–2012	Dynamo Dresden II	5	(2)
2015–2016	Schönwalder SV	6	(0)
2017	FK Srbija Berlin II	1	(0)
Total		71	(24)
- * Club domestic league appearances and goals

Exaucé Mayombo (born 23 August 1990) is a German–Congolese retired footballer who played as a centre forward.

== Career ==
Mayombo started his career in the youth section of the SV Tasmania-Gropiusstadt 1973. In July 2006 he scouted was by VfL Wolfsburg, but only 18 months later he moved back to his hometown and signed a contract with Tennis Borussia Berlin, where he scored five goals in seventeen games. In July 2008 Mayombo joined to FC Carl Zeiss Jena. After scoring six goals in eleven Under 19 Fußball-Bundesliga games he was promoted to the first team in January 2009. In August 2011 he left Jena and signed a contract with Dynamo Dresden II. He was released by Dynamo after one season, but returned to the club six months later.
