= Jhoan Viafara =

Colombian footballer (born 1990)

Jhoan
Personal information
- Full name: Jhoan Viafara
- Date of birth: January 12, 1990 (age 36)
- Place of birth: Colombia
- Position: Forward

Team information
- Current team: Tondela

Senior career*
Years	Team	Apps	(Gls)
2013–	Tondela	28	(4)
- * Club domestic league appearances and goals as of September 8, 2013

Jhoan Viafara (born January 12, 1990) is a Colombian footballer who plays for Tondela .

== Honours ==
Tondela

Taça de Portugal Runners-up: 2021–22

Supertaça de Portugal Runners-up: 2022
