= Suzana Vujošević =

Serbian–Montenegrin footballer

Personal information
- Date of birth: 6 August 1990 (age 36)
- Position: Defender

Senior career*
Years	Team	Apps	(Gls)
- Mašinac
- Ada Velipoje

International career^{‡}
2008	Serbia U19	1	(0)
2013	Montenegro	7	(0)
- * Club domestic league appearances and goals ‡ National team caps and goals as of 28 November 2013

Suzana Vujošević (Serbian: Сузана Вујошевић; born 6 August 1990) is a Serbian–Montenegrin footballer who plays as a defender. She has been a member of the Montenegro women's national team.
