= Jonathan Sykes (engineer) =

American engineer

Jonathan Sykes is an Engineering Services Manager at Schweitzer Engineering Laboratories (SEL) in Albuquerque, New Mexico. Sykes graduated from the University of Arizona in 1982 and since that time has worked in electric power industry at System Protection and Test and at Pacific Gas and Electric Company in San Francisco, California, where he also served as senior manager. During the 1990s, he was with RTU/SCADA systems in Arizona and in 2000 became an inventor of IEC 61850 Generic Object Oriented Substation Events messaging. In 2019, Sykes became a Fellow of the Institute of Electrical and Electronics Engineers (IEEE). He has served as secretary of the IEEE Power and Energy Society.
