= Mehrtens =

Mehrtens is a surname. Notable people with the surname include:

- Andrew Mehrtens (born 1973), New Zealand rugby union player
- George Mehrtens (1907–1954), New Zealand rugby union player
- Herbert Mehrtens (1946–2021), German historian of mathematics
- Warren Mehrtens (1920–1997), American Thoroughbred horse racing jockey
- William O. Mehrtens (1905–1980), United States district judge
