= Rafael Goiano =

Brazilian footballer

Personal information
- Full name: Rafael Mattos dos Santos
- Date of birth: 22 January 1990 (age 36)
- Place of birth: Goiânia, Brazil
- Height: 1.88 m (6 ft 2 in)
- Position: Defender

Team information
- Current team: Mafra
- Number: 4

Senior career*
Years	Team	Apps	(Gls)
2010–2011	Ipitanga	14	(0)
2011	Paracuru		
2012	Boa Esporte	1	(0)
2013	Comercial	13	(0)
2014	Ferroviária	13	(0)
2014	Boa Esporte	0	(0)
2015	São José-RS	13	(0)
2015–2017	Mafra	77	(1)
2018–	São José-RS	38	(2)
- * Club domestic league appearances and goals as of 9 April 2017

Rafael Mattos dos Santos, known as Rafael Goiano (born 22 January 1990) is a Brazilian football player who plays for Mafra.

== Club career ==
He made his professional debut in the Campeonato Brasileiro Série B for Boa on 26 September 2012 in a game against Joinville.
