= Anton Dahlström =

Swedish footballer

Personal information
- Date of birth: 27 August 1990 (age 36)
- Place of birth: Sweden
- Height: 1.79 m (5 ft 10 1/2 in)
- Position: Defender

Team information
- Current team: FK Karlskrona

Youth career
- Lyckeby GoIF

Senior career*
Years	Team	Apps	(Gls)
2009–2011	Karlskrona AIF	40	(2)
2011–2014	Mjällby AIF	30	(1)
2015–2019	FK Karlskrona	97	(16)
- * Club domestic league appearances and goals as of 15 October 2019

Anton Dahlström (born 27 August 1990) is a Swedish footballer who last played for FK Karlskrona as a defender.
