= Tamta Malidze =

Georgian footballer

Personal information
- Date of birth: 15 September 1990 (age 36)
- Position: Midfielder

Senior career*
Years	Team	Apps	(Gls)
- FC Iveria
- Norchi Dinamoeli
- Baia Zugdidi

International career^{‡}
2006–2007	Georgia U19	5	(0)
2009–2015	Georgia	14	(0)
- * Club domestic league appearances and goals ‡ National team caps and goals as of 9 April 2015

Tamta Malidze (Georgian: თამთა მალიძე; born 15 September 1990) is a Georgian footballer who plays as a midfielder. She has been a member of the Georgia women's national team.
