= Tony Mamodaly =

Malagasy footballer (born 1990)

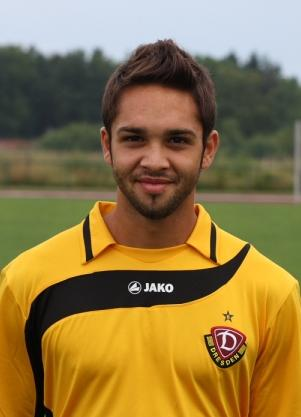
- Mamodaly in 2011

Personal information
- Date of birth: 2 August 1990 (age 36)
- Place of birth: Mannheim, Germany
- Height: 1.75 m (5 ft 9 in)
- Position: Forward

Youth career
- 2006–2008: 1899 Hoffenheim

College career
Years	Team	Apps	(Gls)
2013–2016	St. Thomas University Bobcats		

Senior career*
Years	Team	Apps	(Gls)
2008–2009	Karlsruher SC II		
2009–2011	Dynamo Dresden II	16	(0)
Total		16	(0)

International career
2010	Madagascar	2	(0)
- * Club domestic league appearances and goals

Tony Mamodaly (born 2 August 1990) is a sports agent and former professional footballer who played as a forward. Born in Germany, he represented Madagascar at international level.

== Early and personal life ==
Mamodaly was born in Mannheim, Germany. His father was from Madagascar. Mamodaly initially combined his football career with handball, playing for Rhein-Neckar Löwen and the Germany national youth team, before giving it up to concentrate on football.

== Club career ==
Mamodaly joined TSG 1899 Hoffenheim at the age of 16. After playing with Karlsruher SC II, he trialled with Scottish club Dundee United along with eight teammates, including Lukas Rupp and Matthias Zimmermann. His proposed transfer to Dundee fell through and he instead moved to Dynamo Dresden II, signing for them in October 2009. Mamodaly viewed his time with Dynamo Dresden as a "catastrophe" and that he was bullied by the manager. After two years he trialled with French club Lorient, but that transfer also fell through. He left Dynamo Dresden, and trained with a VDV camp for contractless players. He trialled with 1. FC Nürnberg.

He moved to the United States to play college soccer with the St. Thomas University Bobcats. He spent four seasons with the team, and became their captain. He ended his career in 2016 due to knee problems.

== International career ==
Mamodaly earned two caps for Madagascar in 2010.

== Later career ==
Mamodaly began studying for an MBA at Columbia University before returning to Miami to undertake a master's degree. He also set up a sports agency for young players from Germany, Italy and Brazil to study and play in the United States.
