= Tryfonas Kroustalelis =

Greek footballer

Personal information
- Full name: Tryfon Kroustalelis
- Date of birth: 6 March 1990 (age 36)
- Height: 1.74 m (5 ft 8 1/2 in)
- Position: Defender

Team information
- Current team: Apollon Smyrnis
- Number: 3

Senior career*
| Years | Team | Apps | (Gls) |
| 2007–2009 | Anagennisi Giannitsa | 40 | (1) |
| 2009 | Agrotikos Asteras | 8 | (0) |
| 2010 | Diagoras | 8 | (0) |
| 201 | Apollon Smyrnis | 32 | (0) |
- * Club domestic league appearances and goals

Tryfonas Kroustalelis (Greek: Τρύφωνας Κρουσταλέλης, born 6 March 1990) is a Greek footballer. He played for Apollon Smyrnis in the Greek Football League, as defender.
