= Lucas Klysman =

Brazilian footballer

Personal information
- Full name: Klysman Lucas Lopes Silva
- Date of birth: 15 June 1990 (age 36)
- Place of birth: Rio de Janeiro, Brazil
- Height: 1.84 m (6 ft 0 in)
- Position: Forward

Team information
- Current team: FC United Zürich

Youth career
- 2000–2009: Vitória Guimarães

Senior career*
Years	Team	Apps	(Gls)
2008–2010	Vitória Guimarães	1	(0)
2009–2010	→ Serzedelo (loan)	29	(4)
2010–2011	Naval		
2011–2012	Juventude Évora	10	(2)
2012	Mondinense	8	(6)
2012–2013	Oliveira do Hospital		
2013–2014	Vilaverdense	15	(2)
2014	Oliveira do Hospital		
2014–2015	Vianense	23	(5)
2015–2016	Oliveira de Frades	18	(6)
2016	Lusitano VRSA	12	(3)
2016	Dardania Lausanne	4	(0)
2017–2018	Lusitano FCV	55	(18)
2019	GS Loures	14	(4)
2019–2020	Torreense	21	(4)
2020–	FC United Zürich	8	(2)
- * Club domestic league appearances and goals as of 17:43, 26 January 2021 (UTC)

Klysman Lucas Lopes Silva (born 15 June 1990), aka Lucas Klysman is a Brazilian footballer who plays for FC United Zürich, as forward.

== Career ==
Lucas was born in Rio de Janeiro. He made his Portuguese Liga debut 8 December 2008 as substitute in the 78 minute against Leixões, at Estádio D. Afonso Henriques.

From the season 2009–10 he is loaned out to gain experience at Serzedelo in the Terceira Divisão.
