= Catherine Hyndman =

Northern Irish footballer (born 1990)

Personal information
- Date of birth: 31 August 1990 (age 36)
- Place of birth: Belfast, Northern Ireland
- Positions: Defender; midfielder; forward

Team information
- Current team: Sion Swifts
- Number: 14

Youth career
- Carbury FC

Senior career*
| Years | Team | Apps | (Gls) |
| 2007–2009 | Colchester United | | |
| 2014–2016 | Castlebar Celtic | | |
| 2017–2019 | Sion Swifts | | |
| 2021 | Athlone Town | | |
| 2021– | Sion Swifts | | |

International career^{‡}
- Northern Ireland
- * Club domestic league appearances and goals as of 15:39, 28 May 2022 (UTC) ‡ National team caps and goals as of 15:39, 28 May 2022 (UTC)

Catherine Hyndman (born 31 August 1990) is a Northern Irish footballer and football coach. A versatile left-sided player, she has appeared for the Northern Ireland women's national team.

== Career ==
Hyndman was born in Belfast and moved with her family to Grange, County Sligo when she was 12 years old. She was selected for the Northern Ireland women's national under-19 football team while playing for Colchester United of the FA Women's Premier League Southern Division in England.

She later played as a defender for Women's National League club Castlebar Celtic, while she attended Institute of Technology, Sligo. When Castlebar Celtic folded, she continued her football career by travelling to play for Sion Swifts of the Northern Ireland Women's Premiership. This was due to a lack of women's football teams in the Border Region.

Hyndman has been capped for the Northern Ireland national team, appearing for the team during the 2019 FIFA Women's World Cup qualifying cycle. She was named in the senior squad for the final UEFA Women's Euro 2009 qualifying fixture against Belarus at The Showgrounds, Newry in July 2008. She started the match as Northern Ireland drew 1–1 and collected their first ever point in the Euro qualifying stage.

Hyndman's nickname is Dizzy. When Sligo Rovers entered the Women's Under-17 National League in June 2018, Hyndman was announced as part of the coaching team.

In 2019 Hyndman took some time away from football to give birth to her son, Mason. She signed for Women's National League club Athlone Town in February 2021. Her sister Amy Hyndman was a team-mate at the County Westmeath club. In July 2021 she returned to Sion Swifts.
