= Denis Osadchenko =

Ukrainian-German footballer

Personal information
- Date of birth: 11 May 1990 (age 36)
- Place of birth: Simferopol, Crimean Oblast, Soviet Union
- Height: 1.89 m (6 ft 2 in)
- Position: Defender

Youth career
- 1997–2001: 1.FC Wilmersdorf
- 2001–2005: Hertha 03 Zehlendorf
- 2006–2008: Tennis Borussia Berlin
- 2008–2009: FC Carl Zeiss Jena

Senior career*
Years	Team	Apps	(Gls)
2009–2011	FC Carl Zeiss Jena	5	(0)
2011–2014	Berliner AK	25	(2)
2015	BFC Preussen	8	(1)
2015–2016	Blau-Weiß Berlin	23	(0)
- * Club domestic league appearances and goals

Denis Osadchenko (born 11 May 1990 in Simferopol) is a Ukrainian-German retired footballer.

== Career ==
He began his career with 1.FC Wilmersdorf. He joined Hertha 03 Zehlendorf in 2001, and later Tennis Borussia Berlin on the youth side in January 2006. He then left on 1 July 2008 for the youth side of FC Carl Zeiss Jena and was promoted on 14 January 2009 to the first team, who played his debut on 25 October 2009 against SpVgg Unterhaching.
