= Szymon Salski =

Polish footballer

Personal information
- Full name: Szymon Salski
- Date of birth: 13 September 1990 (age 36)
- Place of birth: Łódź, Poland
- Height: 1.87 m (6 ft 1 1/2 in)
- Position: Defender

Youth career
- ŁKS Łódź

Senior career*
Years	Team	Apps	(Gls)
2008–2013	ŁKS Łódź	17	(1)
2013	Bzura Chodaków		
2013–2015	ŁKS Łódź		
- * Club domestic league appearances and goals

Szymon Salski (born 13 September 1990) is a Polish former professional footballer who played as a defender.

== Honours ==
ŁKS Łódź

- I liga: 2010–11
