= Krall =

Krall may refer to:

== People ==
- Diana Krall (born 1964), Canadian jazz pianist and singer
- Hanna Krall (born 1935), Polish writer
- Johann Baptist Krall (1803–1883), Austrian composer, conductor, and music editor/arranger
- Lance Krall (born 1970), American comedian and actor, television writer, director, and producer of Vietnamese descent
- Yung Krall (born 1946), American former spy born in Vietnam

== Other ==
- Krall, the main villain of the film Star Trek Beyond (2016)
- The Lance Krall Show, a 30-minute comedy television show featuring sketches and on-the-street interaction
