= Thomas Kral =

Austrian footballer

Personal information
- Full name: Thomas Kral
- Date of birth: 8 January 1990 (age 36)
- Place of birth: Wien, Austria
- Height: 1.87 m (6 ft 1 1/2 in)
- Position: Centre back

Team information
- Current team: Nußdorfer AC
- Number: 3

Youth career
- Austria Wien

Senior career*
Years	Team	Apps	(Gls)
2008–2009	Wienerberg	34	(2)
2009–2012	Wiener Neustadt	24	(0)
2009–2010	→ Wienerberg (loan)	15	(2)
2010–2011	→ Wiener SC (loan)	8	(0)
2013–2014	SC Ritzing	24	(0)
2015–2020	Wienerberg	135	(6)
2020–	Nußdorfer AC	11	(1)
- * Club domestic league appearances and goals as of 11:50, 17 January 2021 (UTC)

Thomas Kral (born 8 January 1990) is an Austrian footballer who plays for Nußdorfer AC.
