= Kráľ (surname) =

Kráľ (feminine: Kráľová) is a Slovak surname, meaning 'king'. A Czech cognate of the surname is Král. An Anglicised and Germanised version of the surname is Kral. Notable people with the surname include:

- Daniel Kráľ (born 1978), Czech mathematician and computer scientist
- Fraňo Kráľ (1903–1955), Slovak poet, novelist and politician
- Janko Kráľ (1822–1876), Slovak poet
- Miroslav Kráľ (1947–2025), Slovak footballer
- Radoslav Kráľ (born 1974), Slovak footballer

== See also ==
- Kráľová, a water reservoir
