= Luka Radulovic =

Austrian soccer player

Luka Radulović
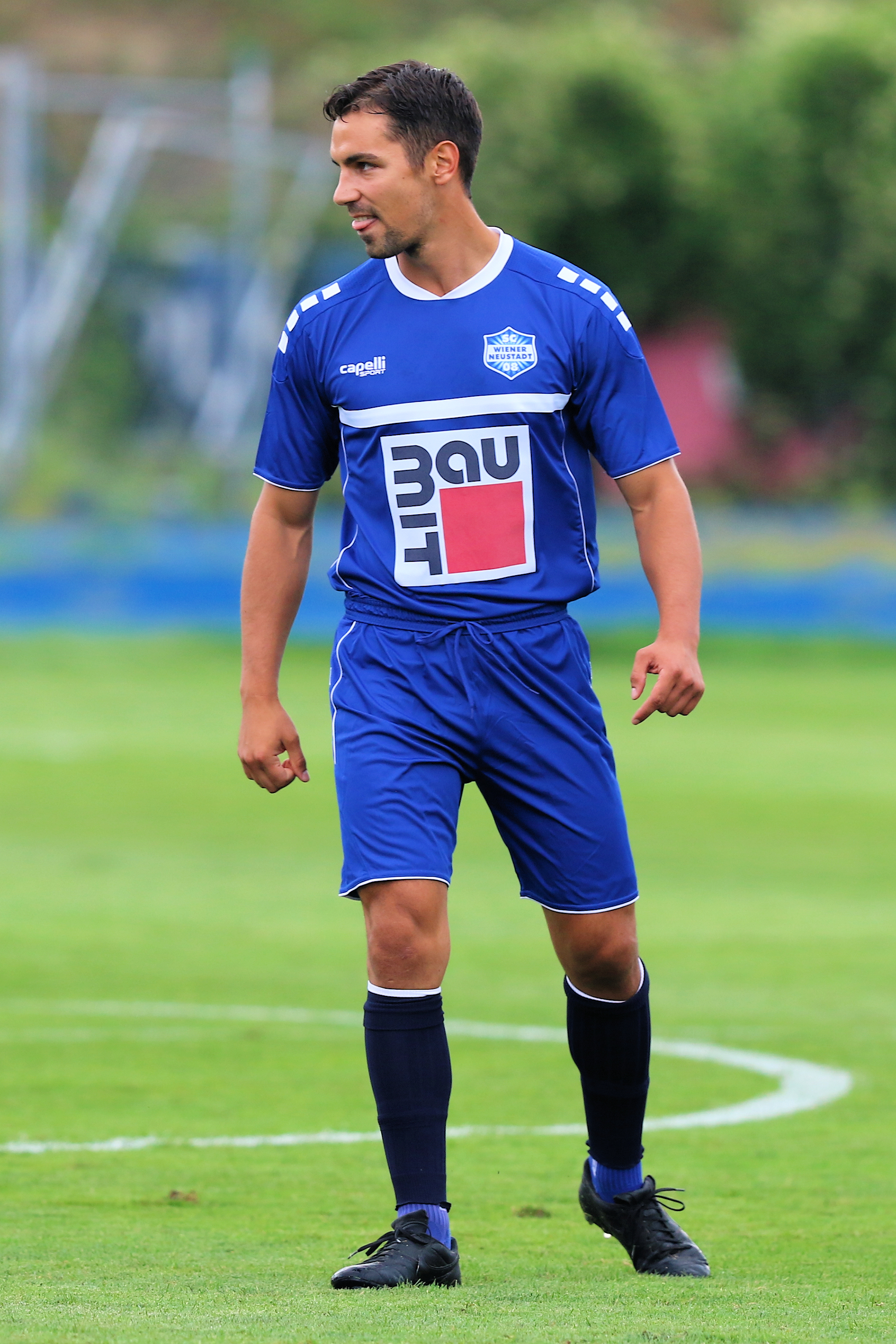

Personal information
- Full name: Luka Radulović
- Date of birth: 17 April 1990 (age 36)
- Place of birth: Austria
- Position: Defender

Team information
- Current team: ASK Bad Vöslau

Senior career*
Years	Team	Apps	(Gls)
2013	SC Wiener Neustadt	1	(0)
2013–	ASK Bad Vöslau	0	(0)
- * Club domestic league appearances and goals as of 18:51, 16 June 2013 (UTC)

Luka Radulović (born 17 April 1990) is an Austrian footballer who, since 2022, has played for SK Srbija München when he was transferred from SV Donaustauf.
