= Lucas Parra =

Spanish footballer (born 1990)

Personal information
- Full name: Lucas Parra Marín
- Date of birth: 27 December 1990 (age 35)
- Place of birth: Silla, Valencian Community, Spain
- Position: Goalkeeper

Youth career
- Valencia
- 2008–2009: Murcia

Senior career*
Years	Team	Apps	(Gls)
2009–2010	Buñol		
2010–2021	Silla		
2021–2022	Buñol	0	(0)
2022	Patacona	2	(0)
- * Club domestic league appearances and goals

Lucas Parra Marín (born 27 December 1990) is a Spanish former footballer who played as a goalkeeper.

== Club career ==
Born in Silla in the Valencian Community of Spain, Parra began his career with La Liga side Valencia, but left in 2008, spending a season apiece with Real Murcia and Buñol. He competed in the 2010 edition of Football Cracks, a Spanish reality TV show dedicated to finding young footballing talent from around the world, sponsored by both Zinedine Zidane and Enzo Francescoli, and hosted by Nico Abad. Parra did not get along with his teammates while on the show, and criticised one of the coaches, Germán Burgos, before being voted off towards the end of the show. Having spoken with Zinedine Zidane about the situation, he apologised to Burgos.

On his return to semi-professional football, he joined Silla in the Preferente Valenciana. After ten years with the club, he scored a goal in a 1–1 draw with Alzira on 23 December 2020, his second goal for the club, following another equaliser in a 2–2 draw with Atlético Saguntino almost a year earlier, on 15 December 2019. The following season he returned to Buñol, though he did not make any appearances in the first half of the 2021–22 season, before moving to Patacona, playing in both promotion playoff games to help them earn promotion to the Tercera Federación.

== Career statistics ==
=== Club ===
Appearances and goals by club, season and competition
Club	Season	League			Cup		Other		Total	
Club	Season	Division	Apps	Goals	Apps	Goals	Apps	Goals	Apps	Goals
Silla	2015–16	Preferente Valenciana	32	0	0	0	4 (Note: Appearances in the promotion playoffs)	0	36	0
Silla	2016–17	Tercera División	33	0	0	0	0	0	33	0
Silla	2017–18	Tercera División	25	0	0	0	0	0	25	0
Silla	2018–19	Tercera División	36	0	0	0	4 (Note: Appearances in the Copa Federación de España)	0	40	0
Silla	2019–20	Tercera División	21	1	0	0	0	0	21	1
Silla	2020–21	Tercera División	26	1	0	0	0	0	26	1
Silla	Total		173	2	0	0	8	0	181	2
Buñol	2021–22	Preferente Valenciana	0	0	0	0	0	0	0	0
Patacona	2021–22	Preferente Valenciana	2	0	0	0	2	0	4	0
Career total			175	2	0	0	10	0	185	2
