= Ernesto Salazar =

Peruvian footballer (born 1990)

- Ernesto Salazar

Personal information
- Full name: Ernesto Junior Salazar Hernández
- Date of birth: May 31, 1990 (age 36)
- Place of birth: Lima, Peru
- Height: 1.71 m (5 ft 7 1/2 in)
- Position: Defensive midfielder

Team information
- Current team: Real Academia FC
- Number: 8

Youth career
- Alianza Lima

Senior career*
| Years | Team | Apps | (Gls) |
| 2007– | Alianza Lima | 0 | (0) |
| 2009–present | →Real Academia (on loan) | | |

International career
| 2006–2007 | Peru U-17 | 10 | (0) |
| 2008– | Peru U-20 | 3 | (0) |
- * Club domestic league appearances and goals as of May 8, 2008

Ernesto Junior Salazar Hernández (born May 31, 1990 in Lima) is a Peruvian football defensive midfielder, currently playing for Real Academia FC on loan from Alianza Lima.

== Club career ==
He made his youth career in Alianza Lima. He was promoted to the first team in 2007 along other players that were in U-17 selection like Reimond Manco, Alonso Bazalar, Eder Hermoza, Luis Trujillo, etc. He never made his official debut with Alianza. In 2009, he decide to go on loan to Real Academia FC of the second division of Perú.

== International career ==
He was part of the Peru U-17 team in the South American Under 17 Football Championship and 2007 FIFA U-17 World Cup in South Korea.

He was also part of Peru U-20 in the 2009 South American Youth Championship, having a quick elimination after 4 matches.
