= Roberto Cunha =

Brazilian footballer (born 1990)

Personal information
- Full name: Roberto Cunha Ribeiro Filho
- Date of birth: 26 April 1990 (age 36)
- Place of birth: Rio de Janeiro, Brazil
- Height: 1.92 m (6 ft 3 1/2 in)
- Position: Centre-back

Team information
- Current team: Amora
- Number: 21

Youth career
- 2007−2008: Alcanenense
- 2008−2009: Porto

Senior career*
Years	Team	Apps	(Gls)
2007−2008	Alcanenense		
2010−2011	Monsanto	1	(0)
2011−2012	Alcanenense	7	(0)
2012	São Cristóvão		
2013	Camboriú	12	(0)
2013	Madureira	1	(0)
2013−2014	Alcanenense	16	(0)
2014−2015	Atlético CP	34	(2)
2015−2016	Loures	26	(1)
2016−2017	Cova da Piedade	17	(2)
2018	Praiense	10	(0)
2018–2019	Real	30	(3)
2019–	Amora	8	(0)
- * Club domestic league appearances and goals as of 00:54, 29 October 2019 (UTC)

Roberto Cunha Ribeiro Filho (born 26 April 1990) is a Brazilian professional football player who currently plays for Amora FC in Portugal as a centre-back.

== Career ==
Born in Rio de Janeiro, Roberto moved to Portugal in 2007, joining the youth ranks of Alcanenense, and a year later FC Porto. After short one year spells in various clubs in Portugal and Brazil, mostly at regional level, in July 2014, he moved to Atlético Clube de Portugal in the Segunda Liga.

He made his professional debut on 17 August 2014 in a home draw against G.D. Chaves. seeing the club being relegated at the end of the season. Roberto then moved to GS Loures, where he was scouted by Sporting Kansas City in October 2015, following a Taça de Portugal match against Boavista. After completing the season with Loures, he signed with Cova da Piedade for the 2016–17 LigaPro.
