= Krystal Parker =

English footballer

Personal information
- Date of birth: 28 October 1990 (age 36)
- Place of birth: Oldham, England
- Position: Goalkeeper

Youth career
- Manchester United
- Stockport County Ladies

Senior career*
Years	Team	Apps	(Gls)
2006–2008	Stockport County Ladies		
2008–2013	Blackburn Rovers Ladies		
2013–2014	Aston Villa Ladies		

International career^{‡}
2012–2014	Northern Ireland	7	(0)
- * Club domestic league appearances and goals as of 14:48, 17 February 2019 (UTC) ‡ National team caps and goals as of 21 September 2014

Krystal Parker (born 28 October 1990) is a football goalkeeper. She played for Blackburn Rovers Ladies and represented the senior Northern Ireland squad.

== Club career ==
Parker began playing football at the age of six, soon joining Manchester United where she played mixed football before playing for their Under-10 girls' team. She joined the Stockport County Ladies' Centre of Excellence, progressing to their senior team, Parker joined Blackburn Rovers Ladies in the 2008 close season, as understudy to first-choice senior keeper Danielle Hill. In only the second game of the 2008–09 season, Hill suffered cruciate ligament damage against Chelsea, with Parker taking over for the remainder of the season. She also began the following season as Rovers' first choice, playing in the 1–1 draw with Doncaster Rovers Belles on the opening day of the season.

After signing for Aston Villa, Parker lost her place in the team due to an injured finger.

== International career ==
Parker was included in England's 30-player provisional squad for the Under-20 Women's World Cup, just months after signing for Blackburn. Although later left on stand-by for the final squad, a month later she was asked to join the Under-23 squad's training camp.

She was called into the senior Northern Ireland panel in October 2011. After playing in a friendly game against Republic of Ireland, Parker said, "I'm very proud to have held recognition for both England and Ireland, but I'm very excited and look forward to helping and relishing the exciting challenges ahead with the Northern Ireland squad."

== Statistics ==
Club	Season	League		WFA Cup		Premier League Cup		County Cup		Other		Total	
Club	Season	Apps	Goals	Apps	Goals	Apps	Goals	Apps	Goals	Apps	Goals	Apps	Goals
Blackburn Rovers Ladies	2008–09	19	0	3	0	2	0	4	0	0	0	28	0
Blackburn Rovers Ladies	2009–10	7	0	0	0	2	0	1	0	0	0	10	0
Career total		26	0	3	0	2	0	5	0	0	0	36	0
