= Jonathan Sykes (footballer) =

Bahamian footballer

Personal information
- Date of birth: 9 March 1990 (age 36)
- Place of birth: Nassau, Bahamas
- Position: Midfielder

Youth career
- 2008–2011: Maryville College

International career^{‡}
Years	Team	Apps	(Gls)
2011–	Bahamas	2	(0)
- ‡ National team caps and goals as of 14 September 2011

Jonathan Sykes (born 9 March 1990) is a Bahamian international footballer who played college soccer in the US for Maryville College as a midfielder.

== Career ==
Sykes has played college soccer in the United States for Maryville College since 2008.

He made his international debut for Bahamas in 2011, and has appeared in FIFA World Cup qualifying matches.
