= Sergei Luzhkov =

Russian footballer

Personal information
- Full name: Sergei Andreyevich Luzhkov
- Date of birth: 11 October 1990 (age 36)
- Height: 1.65 m (5 ft 5 in)
- Positions: Midfielder; forward

Youth career
- Metallurg-KRAZ Krasnoyarsk

Senior career*
| Years | Team | Apps | (Gls) |
| 2008–2010 | FC Metallurg-Yenisey Krasnoyarsk | 78 | (5) |
| 2011 | FC Krasnodar | 0 | (0) |
| 2011–2013 | FC Yenisey Krasnoyarsk | 30 | (0) |
| 2012–2013 | → FC Volga Ulyanovsk (loan) | 19 | (3) |
| 2014–2015 | FC Restavratsiya Krasnoyarsk | | |
| 2016 | FC Rassvet-Restavratsiya Krasnoyarsk | | |
| 2018 | FC Spartak Zheleznogorsk | | |
- * Club domestic league appearances and goals

Sergei Andreyevich Luzhkov (Russian: Серге́й Андреевич Лужков; born 11 October 1990) is a Russian former professional football player.

== Club career ==
He played 3 seasons in the Russian Football National League for FC Yenisey Krasnoyarsk.
