= Raynaldo Sturrup =

Bahamian footballer

Personal information
- Date of birth: 11 January 1990 (age 36)
- Place of birth: Nassau, Bahamas
- Position: Goalkeeper

Youth career
- 2010–2012: Thomas University

International career^{‡}
Years	Team	Apps	(Gls)
- Bahamas U17
- Bahamas U20
2011–	Bahamas	2	(0)
- ‡ National team caps and goals as of 14 September 2011

Raynaldo Sturrup (born 11 January 1990) is a Bahamian international footballer who played college soccer for Thomas University, as a goalkeeper.

== Career ==
Sturrup has played college soccer in the United States for Thomas University.

He made his international debut for Bahamas in 2011, and has appeared in FIFA World Cup qualifying matches.
