= Merten =

- Commune
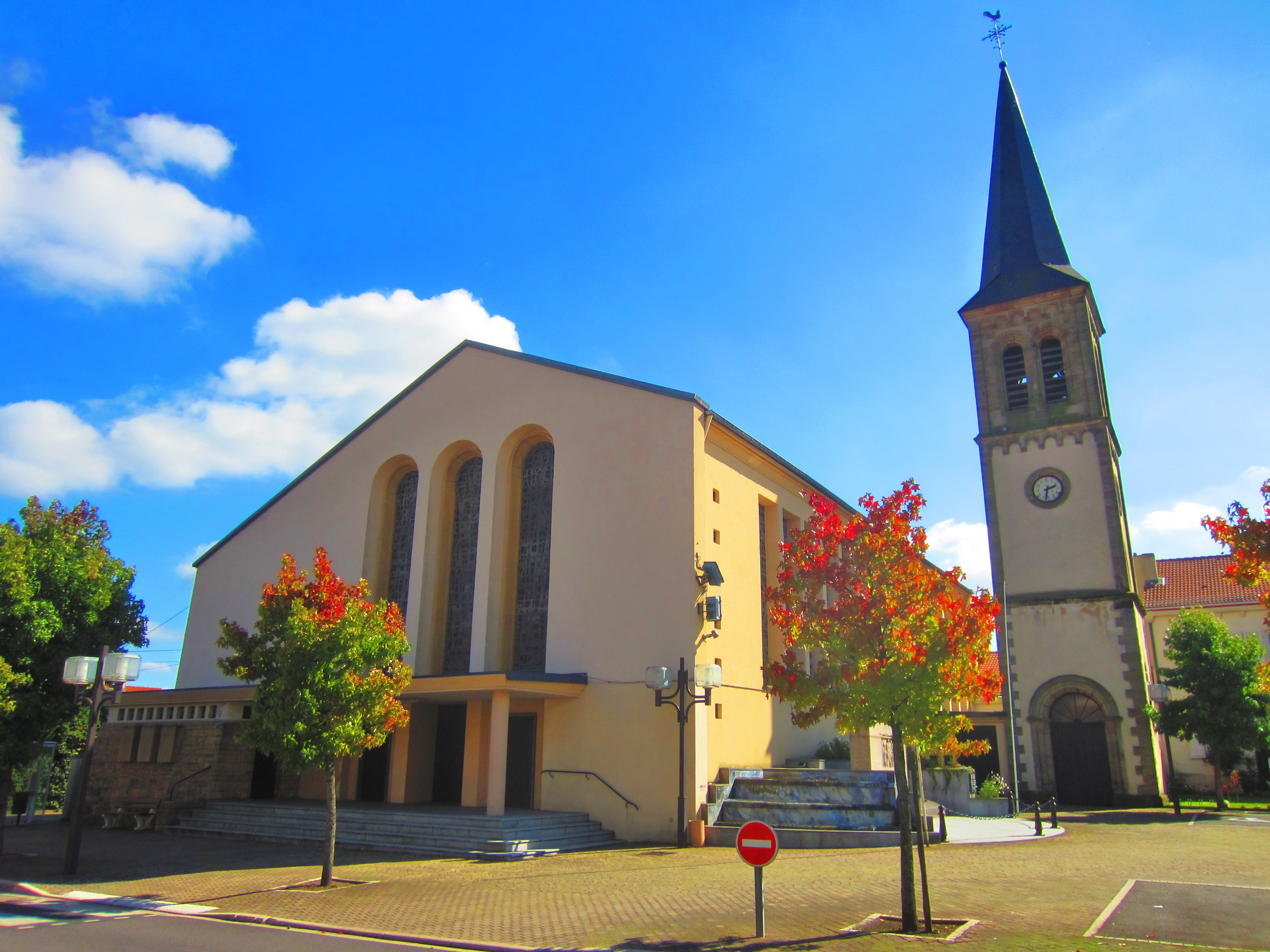
- The church in Merten

- Coat of arms
- Location of Merten
- Location within France Location within Grand Est
- Coordinates: 49°14′58″N 6°40′04″E
- Country: France
- Region: Grand Est
- Department: Moselle
- Arrondissement: Forbach-Boulay-Moselle
- Canton: Bouzonville
- Intercommunality: CC Houve-Pays Boulageois

Government
  - Mayor (2022–2026): Rachel Ercker
- Area^{1}: 5.23 km^{2} (2.02 sq mi)
- Elevation: 200 m (660 ft)
- Highest elevation: 305 m (1,001 ft)
- Lowest elevation: 196 m (643 ft)
- Population (2023): 1,444
  - Density: 276/km^{2} (715/sq mi)
- Time zone: UTC+01:00 (CET)
  - Summer (DST): UTC+02:00 (CEST)
- INSEE/Postal code: 57460 /57550
- ^{1} French Land Register data, which excludes lakes, ponds, glaciers > 1 km^{2} (0.386 sq mi or 247 acres) and river estuaries.

Merten (French pronunciation: [mɛʁtən]) is a commune in the Moselle department in Grand Est in north-eastern France. In 1973 it absorbed two former communes: Berviller-en-Moselle and Rémering-lès-Hargarten.

== See also ==
- Communes of the Moselle department
