= Miroslav Král =

Czech footballer (born 1986)

Personal information
- Date of birth: 16 September 1986 (age 40)
- Place of birth: Brno, Czechoslovakia
- Height: 1.86 m (6 ft 1 in)
- Position: Defender

Team information
- Current team: FC Zbrojovka Brno
- Number: 2

Youth career
- –2004: SK Líšeň
- 2004–2005: FC Zbrojovka Brno

Senior career*
Years	Team	Apps	(Gls)
2005–2007	FC Zbrojovka Brno B	67	(4)
2008	Fotbal Fulnek	14	(0)
2009–2010	FC Zbrojovka Brno B	27	(1)
2010–2011	SK Líšeň	21	(5)
2011–	FC Zbrojovka Brno	16	(1)
2011	→ FC Sparta Brno	1	(0)
- * Club domestic league appearances and goals as of 29 September 2012

Miroslav Král (born 16 September 1986, in Brno) is a Czech football player who currently plays for FC Zbrojovka Brno. Miroslav plays the defensive position.
