= Martin Pembleton =

English footballer

Personal information
- Full name: Martin John Pembleton
- Date of birth: 1 June 1990 (age 36)
- Place of birth: Scunthorpe, England
- Position: Attacking midfielder

Team information
- Current team: Brigg Town
- Number: 7

Youth career
- Lincoln City

Senior career*
Years	Team	Apps	(Gls)
2008–2009	Lincoln City	12	(0)
2009	Lincoln United	65	(17)
2009–2010	Winterton Rangers	36	(21)
2010–2011	Bottesford Town	29	(9)
2011–2012	Buxton	34	(7)
2012–2013	Goole	34	(12)
2013–2019	Bottesford Town	279	(71)
2019-2023	Brigg Town	117	(28)
2023-2023	Winterton Rangers	17	(10)
2023-	Brigg Town	27	(5)
- * Club domestic league appearances and goals as of 17:58, 29 August 2008 (UTC)

Martin Pembleton (born 1 June 1990) is an English former footballer, who played as attacking midfielder for Brigg Town. He is now the current Brigg Town Manager alongside Stephen McCarron. He won his first game as manager in convincing fashion as Brigg beat Swallownest 8-0 on April 4th 2025.

== Lincoln City ==
Pembleton joined the Centre of Excellence at Lincoln City as a nine-year-old and progressed through the system, starting a two-year Apprenticeship for Sporting Excellence (ASE) scholarship with the club at the beginning of the 2006–2007 season. He continued his progression, making his first team debut on 24 March 2008, at home to Hereford United in the 2–1 win in League Two. In April 2008 Pembleton, alongside Gary King, was offered a one-year professional contract.

However, his failed to make a first team appearance as a professional being restricted to just six appearances as an unused substitute and on 6 March 2009 he joined Lincoln United on a month's loan. Following the close of the 2008–09 season, Pembleton was one of seven players released by the club.

== Non-League career ==
After spending a trial period with Boston United, appearing in their 1-1 friendly draw with Lincoln City on 15 July 2009, he signed for Lincoln United before joining Winterton Rangers in December 2009 and Bottesford Town in the summer of 2010. In February 2011 he signed dual registration forms with Buxton enabling to play both for Bottesford and Buxton. In July 2012 he joined Goole.
