= Tom Christian Merkens =

German footballer

Personal information
- Date of birth: 20 January 1990 (age 36)
- Place of birth: Germany
- Position: Central midfielder

Team information
- Current team: TSV Havelse

Youth career
- –2000: FC Wacker Neustadt
- 2000–2009: Hannover 96

Senior career*
Years	Team	Apps	(Gls)
2009–2012	Hannover 96 II	62	(2)
2012–2013	TSV Havelse	32	(4)
2013–2016	VfL Osnabrück	22	(0)
2016–	TSV Havelse	0	(0)
- * Club domestic league appearances and goals as of 24 May 2015

Tom Christian Merkens (born 20 January 1990) is a German footballer who currently plays for TSV Havelse.
