= David Camps =

French footballer (born 1990)

Personal information
- Full name: David Camps
- Date of birth: 22 May 1990 (age 36)
- Place of birth: Martigues, France
- Height: 1.72 m (5 ft 8 in)
- Position: Right winger

Team information
- Current team: ES Fosséenne

Youth career
- AJ Auxerre

Senior career*
Years	Team	Apps	(Gls)
2008–2012	AJ Auxerre B	52	(7)
2009–2010	AJ Auxerre C	16	(6)
2010–2011	→ US Luzenac (loan)	23	(1)
2012–2013	AJ Auxerre	2	(0)
2012–2013	US Le Pontet	0	(0)
2015–	ES Fosséenne		
- * Club domestic league appearances and goals as of 23 April 2012

David Camps (born 22 May 1990) is a footballer who plays for ES Fosséenne.

The right winger played in the season 2010/2011 23 games on loan for US Luzenac.
