= Rafa (footballer, born 1990) =

Brazilian footballer

Personal information
- Full name: Rafael Moreira Araújo
- Date of birth: 23 May 1990 (age 36)
- Place of birth: São Paulo, Brazil
- Height: 1.78 m (5 ft 10 in)
- Position: Midfielder

Youth career
- 2006–2009: Trofense

Senior career*
Years	Team	Apps	(Gls)
2009–2012	Trofense	2	(0)
2010–2011	→ Fão (loan)	27	(0)
Total		29	(0)
- * Club domestic league appearances and goals

Rafael Moreira Araújo (born 23 May 1990), known professionally as Rafael Moreira, or to fans, simply Rafa, is a Brazilian footballer who played for C.D. Trofense as a midfielder.

== Career ==
Rafas first match with C.D. Trofense and played against Leixões S.C. in Estádio do CD Trofense tied at 1-1. Rafas first loss was against C.F. Os Belenenses on 14 October 2011 with a score of 3–1 in Estádio do Restelo. Rafas first win with the team was on 13 May 2012, against the C.D. Aves football club in Estádio do CD Trofense.
