= Pablo Sánchez (footballer, born 1990) =

Mexican footballer

Personal information
- Full name: Pablo Sánchez Pájaro
- Date of birth: 28 March 1990 (age 36)
- Place of birth: San Luis Potosí City, San Luis Potosí, Mexico
- Height: 1.75 m (5 ft 9 in)
- Position: Midfielder

Team information
- Current team: Club Deportivo Tepatitlán
- Number: 161

Youth career
- 2002–2005: Club San Luis
- 2005–2007: Monarcas Morelia
- 2007–2010: San Luis F.C.

Senior career*
Years	Team	Apps	(Gls)
2010–2011	San Luis F.C.		
2011–2012	Club Nacional		
2013–2015	Atlético San Luis		
2016	Club Deportivo Tepatitlán de Morelos		
- * Club domestic league appearances and goals

Pablo Sánchez Pájaro (born March 28, 1990) is a Mexican professional football player who plays as a defensive midfielder for C.D. Tepatitlán de Morelos.

== Career ==
Sánchez started out his career in the youth team of his local club, San Luis F.C., later transferring to the youth team of Monarcas Morelia for two years before returning to his hometown club. While being captain of the U-20s and participating intermittently with the senior team he suffered a shoulder luxation which eventually required surgery and a recovery time of 3 months. After his recovery he went on to play for Club Nacional in Paraguay, where he participated with the reserve team. Afterwards he returned to play for the newly formed Atlético San Luis, where he would mark his debut in the Copa MX against Puebla F.C., as well as in Ascenso MX against Correcaminos UAT. After 3 tournaments under 3 different coaches the team was eventually dissolved. Sanchez remained playing in the club's brother team Club Deportivo Tepatitlán de Morelos, on Mexico's second division.
