= SV Wienerberg =

- Logo as of 2016
- Full name: Sport Verein Wienerberg
- Founded: 1921
- Ground: Sportplatz Wienerberg
- Capacity: 3,000
- League: Regionalliga East
- 2025–26: Wiener Stadtliga, 1st of 16 (promoted)

SV Wienerberg is an Austrian association football club from Vienna. The club was founded as ASV Wienerberg (Arbeiter Sportverein, Workers' Sports Club) in 1921 by Czech immigrants, primarily labourers from the local brickworks - today's global construction material producer Wienerberger - at the hill Wienerberg in the Viennese district of Favoriten. The company lent its support and provided the grounds. The club took on its current name in 1970.

From 1929 to 1934 the club played in the league of the labour movement, the Vereinigung der Amateur-Fußballvereine Österreichs (VAFÖ). Greatest successes of the club are the two stints in the Austrian second division, the Regional League East, from 1962 to 1968 and from 1970 to 1973, achieving second places in 1970 and 1972. Notable is also the appearance in the quarter-final of the Austrian Cup in the 1971–72 season.

The most prominent players in Wienerberg's history are centre-half Franz Kellinger, who played once for the national side in 1929, and Walter Zeman, who is considered one of the very best goalkeepers in Austrian history. Both commenced their careers with the club in the early 1920s and 1950s respectively.

SV Wienerberg plays on the Sportplatz Wienerberg, which has a field with artificial surface measuring 100 metres by 66 metres. The capacity is indicated with 3,000 spectators.

== Notable players ==
- Franz Kellinger
- Walter Zeman
- Zeljko Radovic
- Predrag Sljivic
- Ryan Wylie
