= Dussan =

Dussan, Dussán, or Dussane is a surname. It is the surname of:

- Alicia Dussán de Reichel (1920–2023), Colombian anthropologist and ethnologist
- Béatrix Dussane (1888–1969), French actress
- Carlos Dussan, winner of the 2018 Grammy Award for Best Recording Package
- Elizabeth B. Dussan V. (born 1946), American applied mathematician, physicist, and chemical engineer
- Hernando Durán Dussán (1920–1988), Colombian lawyer and politician
- Javier Dussan (born 1980), Colombian footballer
- Lina Dussan, Colombian gymnast in the 2018 Pacific Rim Gymnastics Championships
