= 2007 Categoría Primera B season =

Copa Premier
- Season: 2007
- Dates: 10 February – 10 November 2007
- Champions: Envigado (2nd title)
- Promoted: Envigado
- Relegated: None
- Top goalscorer: Wilder Medina; Giovanni Moreno (19 goals each)

The 2007 Categoría Primera B season, officially known as the 2007 Copa Premier for sponsorship reasons, was the 18th season of Colombia's second tier football league Categoría Primera B since its founding. The competition began on 10 February and ended on 10 November 2007. Envigado were the champions, winning both of the season's short tournaments to claim their second Primera B title as well as promotion to Categoría Primera A.

== Format ==
The season was split into two tournaments: Torneo I and Torneo II, with three stages each. For both tournaments, the 18 participating teams were divided into two groups of nine teams each, with teams playing all teams in their group as well as one team from the other group twice. In Torneo I, the groups were formed by geographical criteria, grouping nearby teams, while in the second tournament, geographical rivals were assigned to different groups. The top four teams of each group advanced to a semifinal group stage with two groups of four teams, which was also played in a double round-robin fashion, with the two group winners contesting the tournament finals. The winners of both of the season's tournaments would face each other in the season's grand final, with the champion being promoted at the end of the season and the runner-up playing the promotion/relegation playoff against the second-from-bottom team in the relegation table of the 2007 Primera A.

== Teams ==
18 teams took part in the competition in this season. The 2006 Primera B champions La Equidad, who were promoted to Categoría Primera A, were replaced by Envigado, relegated from the top flight in the previous season. Pumas de Casanare ceased to exist at the end of the previous season, selling its license to Real Santander who were based in Floridablanca, whilst Expreso Rojo relocated from Cartagena to Fusagasugá, Cundinamarca.

Locations of the 2007 Categoría Primera B teams.

Club	City	Stadium	Capacity
Academia	Bogotá	Compensar	4,500
Alianza Petrolera	Barrancabermeja	Daniel Villa Zapata	8,000
Atlético Bello	Bello	Tulio Ospina	12,000
Bajo Cauca	Caucasia	Orlando Aníbal Monroy	4,000
Barranquilla	Barranquilla	Romelio Martínez	10,000
Bogotá	Bogotá	Alfonso López Pumarejo	12,000
Centauros	Villavicencio	Manuel Calle Lombana	15,000
Córdoba	Cereté	Alberto Saibis Saker	12,000
Cortuluá	Tuluá	Doce de Octubre	16,000
Dépor	Jamundí	Cacique Jamundí	3,500
Deportivo Rionegro	Rionegro	Alberto Grisales	14,000
Envigado	Envigado	Polideportivo Sur	11,000
Expreso Rojo	Fusagasugá	Fernando Mazuera	4,500
Girardot	Girardot	Luis Antonio Duque Peña	15,000
Patriotas	Tunja	La Independencia	8,500
Real Santander	Floridablanca	Álvaro Gómez Hurtado	5,000
Unión Magdalena	Santa Marta	Eduardo Santos	22,000
Valledupar	Valledupar	Armando Maestre Pavajeau	10,000

== Torneo I ==
=== First stage ===
==== Group A ====
Pos	Team	Pld	W	D	L	GF	GA	GD	Pts	Qualification
1	Envigado	18	9	4	5	27	15	+12	31	Advance to Semi-finals
2	Valledupar	18	9	3	6	23	19	+4	30	Advance to Semi-finals
3	Unión Magdalena	18	7	8	3	17	13	+4	29	Advance to Semi-finals
4	Deportivo Rionegro	18	8	4	6	25	25	0	28	Advance to Semi-finals
5	Barranquilla	18	7	6	5	24	15	+9	27	
6	Atlético Bello	18	6	8	4	25	16	+9	26	
7	Bajo Cauca	18	7	3	8	26	29	−3	24	
8	Córdoba	18	6	4	8	17	18	−1	22	
9	Alianza Petrolera	18	1	3	14	13	51	−38	6	

Source: RSSSF

==== Group B ====
Pos	Team	Pld	W	D	L	GF	GA	GD	Pts	Qualification
1	Bogotá	18	8	6	4	27	19	+8	30	Advance to Semi-finals
2	Academia	18	7	8	3	21	14	+7	29	Advance to Semi-finals
3	Patriotas	18	8	4	6	27	18	+9	28	Advance to Semi-finals
4	Centauros	18	7	5	6	24	24	0	26	Advance to Semi-finals
5	Dépor	18	6	6	6	15	21	−6	24	
6	Cortuluá	18	6	5	7	15	15	0	23	
7	Real Santander	18	7	2	9	17	18	−1	23	
8	Girardot	18	6	2	10	15	20	−5	20	
9	Expreso Rojo	18	4	5	9	19	27	−8	17	

Source: RSSSF

=== Semi-finals ===
==== Group A ====
Pos	Team	Pld	W	D	L	GF	GA	GD	Pts	Qualification	ENV	MAG	RIO	VAL
1	Envigado	6	4	2	0	7	2	+5	14	Advance to the Finals	—	0–0	1–1	1–0
2	Unión Magdalena	6	3	2	1	9	5	+4	11		0–1	—	2–1	3–2
3	Deportivo Rionegro	6	2	2	2	7	5	+2	8		0–1	1–1	—	2–0
4	Valledupar	6	0	0	6	3	14	−11	0		1–3	0–3	0–2	—

Source: RSSSF

==== Group B ====
Pos	Team	Pld	W	D	L	GF	GA	GD	Pts	Qualification	ACA	CEN	PAT	BOG
1	Academia	6	4	2	0	11	1	+10	14	Advance to the Finals	—	2–0	3–1	3–0
2	Centauros	6	2	3	1	6	6	0	9		0–0	—	2–1	2–1
3	Patriotas	6	1	2	3	7	8	−1	5		0–0	1–1	—	3–0
4	Bogotá	6	1	1	4	4	13	−9	4		0–3	1–1	2–1	—

Source: RSSSF

=== Finals ===
6 June 2007

Academia	1–1	Envigado

Estadio Compensar, Bogotá

9 June 2007

Envigado	1–1	Academia
Penalties
	4–3

Estadio Polideportivo Sur, Envigado

Tied 2–2 on aggregate, Envigado won on penalties.

Copa Premier
2007–I winners

== Torneo II ==
=== First stage ===
==== Group A ====
Pos	Team	Pld	W	D	L	GF	GA	GD	Pts	Qualification
1	Bogotá	18	7	8	3	22	14	+8	29	Advance to Semi-finals
2	Envigado	18	6	11	1	16	10	+6	29	Advance to Semi-finals
3	Unión Magdalena	18	8	4	6	23	16	+7	28	Advance to Semi-finals
4	Dépor	18	8	4	6	19	17	+2	28	Advance to Semi-finals
5	Girardot	18	5	9	4	14	14	0	24	
6	Córdoba	18	6	4	8	21	23	−2	22	
7	Atlético Bello	18	4	8	6	18	20	−2	20	
8	Centauros	18	5	5	8	16	22	−6	20	
9	Alianza Petrolera	18	2	6	10	10	25	−15	12	

Source: RSSSF

==== Group B ====
Pos	Team	Pld	W	D	L	GF	GA	GD	Pts	Qualification
1	Deportivo Rionegro	18	10	5	3	25	14	+11	35	Advance to Semi-finals
2	Academia	18	8	4	6	25	16	+9	28	Advance to Semi-finals
3	Patriotas	18	7	5	6	27	20	+7	26	Advance to Semi-finals
4	Valledupar	18	7	4	7	19	21	−2	25	Advance to Semi-finals
5	Expreso Rojo	18	7	4	7	21	18	+3	25	
6	Bajo Cauca	18	5	8	5	21	22	−1	23	
7	Cortuluá	18	5	8	5	21	25	−4	23	
8	Barranquilla	18	6	3	9	23	34	−11	21	
9	Real Santander	18	5	2	11	14	24	−10	17	

Source: RSSSF

=== Semi-finals ===
==== Group A ====
Pos	Team	Pld	W	D	L	GF	GA	GD	Pts	Qualification	ENV	BOG	MAG	DEP
1	Envigado	6	3	2	1	8	4	+4	11	Advance to the Finals	—	2–0	1–1	3–1
2	Bogotá	6	2	3	1	4	4	0	9		2–1	—	0–0	1–0
3	Unión Magdalena	6	0	5	1	3	4	−1	5		0–0	1–1	—	1–1
4	Dépor	6	1	2	3	3	6	−3	5		0–1	0–0	1–0	—

Source: RSSSF

==== Group B ====
Pos	Team	Pld	W	D	L	GF	GA	GD	Pts	Qualification	ACA	VAL	RIO	PAT
1	Academia	6	4	2	0	12	6	+6	14	Advance to the Finals	—	3–1	2–2	3–2
2	Valledupar	6	2	2	2	5	6	−1	8		0–0	—	1–1	1–0
3	Deportivo Rionegro	6	1	3	2	5	7	−2	6		0–1	1–0	—	1–1
4	Patriotas	6	1	1	4	7	10	−3	4		1–3	1–2	2–0	—

Source: RSSSF

=== Finals ===
7 November 2007

Envigado	2–1	Academia

Estadio Polideportivo Sur, Envigado

10 November 2007

Academia	1–2	Envigado

Estadio Compensar, Bogotá

Envigado won 4–2 on aggregate.

Copa Premier
2007–II winners

== Grand final ==
The grand final was cancelled after Envigado won the season's two short tournaments, promoting directly to Categoría Primera A as Primera B champions. As runners-up of both the Torneo I and Torneo II, Academia advanced to the promotion/relegation playoff as season runners-up.

2007 Copa Premier champions

2nd title

== Promotion/relegation playoff ==
The 2007 Categoría Primera B runners-up, Academia, had to play a two-legged tie against Deportivo Pereira, the second worst team in the 2007 Primera A relegation table, for the final spot in the 2008 Categoría Primera A season. As the Primera A team, Deportivo Pereira played the second leg at home.

28 November 2007

Academia	1–1	Deportivo Pereira
Ramos 31'	Report	Restrepo 90'

Estadio Compensar, Bogotá

1 December 2007

Deportivo Pereira	3–1	Academia
Restrepo 32' (pen.), 36', 83'	Report	F. Serrano 17' (pen.)

Estadio Hernán Ramírez Villegas, Pereira
Referee: Wilmar Roldán

Deportivo Pereira won 4–2 on aggregate and remained in Categoría Primera A.
