= James Rodríguez =

Colombian footballer (born 1991)

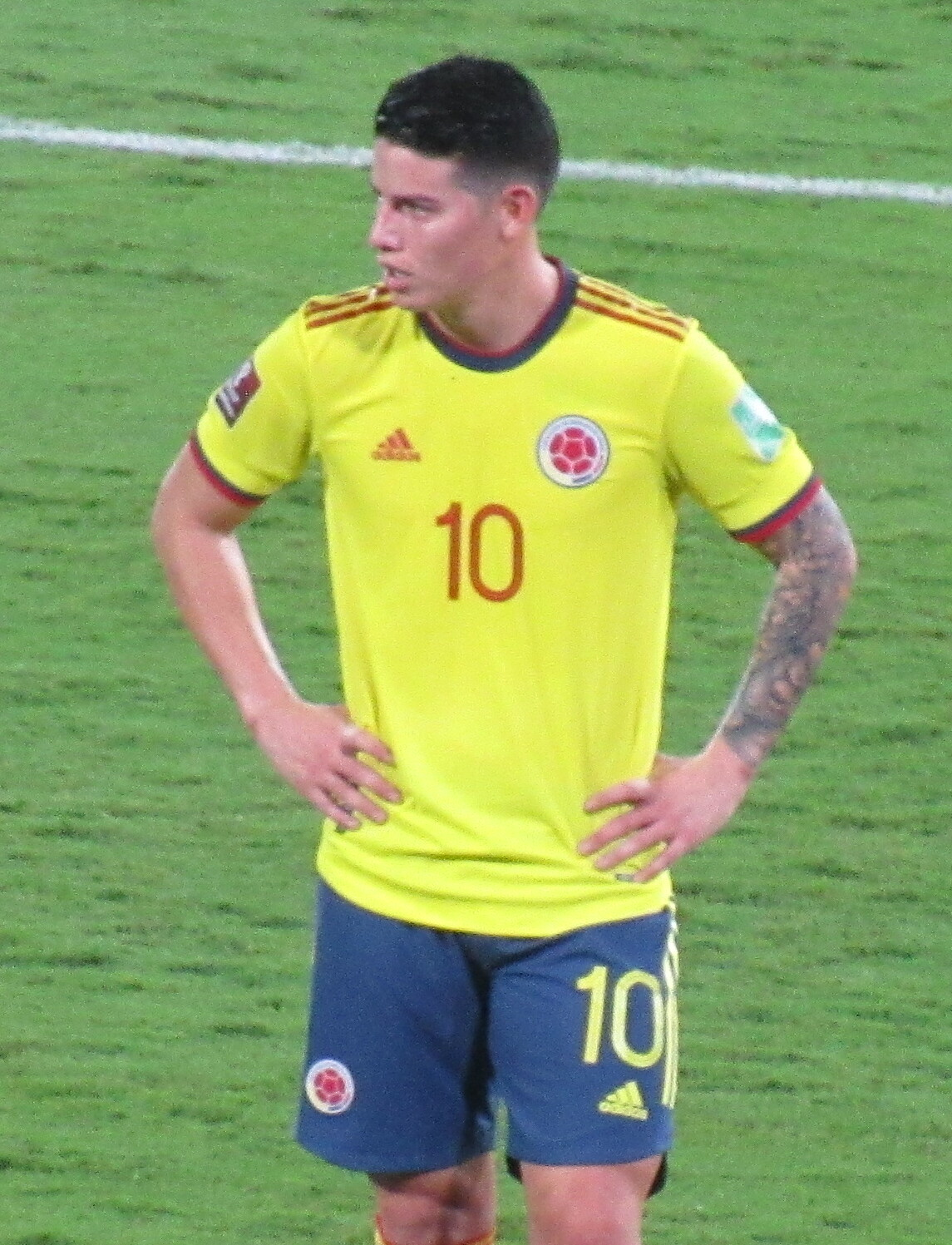
- Rodríguez with Colombia in 2022

Personal information
- Full name: James David Rodríguez Rubio
- Date of birth: 12 July 1991 (age 35)
- Place of birth: Cúcuta, Norte de Santander, Colombia
- Height: 1.81 m (5 ft 11 in)
- Positions: Attacking midfielder; right winger

Team information
- Current team: Atlético Nacional
- Number: 23

Youth career
- 2001–2005: Academia Tolimense de Fútbol
- 2005–2006: Envigado

Senior career*
Years	Team	Apps	(Gls)
2006–2008	Envigado	30	(9)
2008–2010	Banfield	42	(5)
2010–2013	Porto	63	(25)
2013–2014	Monaco	34	(9)
2014–2020	Real Madrid	85	(29)
2017–2019	→ Bayern Munich (loan)	43	(14)
2020–2021	Everton	23	(6)
2021–2022	Al-Rayyan	13	(4)
2022–2023	Olympiacos	20	(5)
2023–2024	São Paulo	18	(2)
2024–2025	Rayo Vallecano	6	(0)
2025	León	31	(5)
2026	Minnesota United	6	(0)
2026–	Atlético Nacional	10	(0)

International career
2007	Colombia U17	11	(3)
2011	Colombia U20	5	(3)
2011–2026	Colombia	131	(31)
Medal record
Men's football
Representing Colombia
Copa América
Runner-up	2024 United States
Third place	2016 United States
- * Club domestic league appearances and goals as of 22:37, 14 November 2026 (UTC)

James David Rodríguez Rubio (born 12 July 1991) is a Colombian professional footballer who plays as an attacking midfielder for Categoría Primera A club Atlético Nacional. From 2009 to 2019, various performance analyses and statistical models in European football positioned Rodríguez as the best attacking midfielder in the world, and he is widely considered one of the greatest players in Colombian history.

After debuting with Envigado, Rodríguez's early breakthrough occurred in 2009 with Banfield, where he became the youngest foreign player to debut, score, and win a championship in the Argentine league, contributing to the club's first league title in its 113-year history. In 2010, he joined Porto, winning six titles, including the UEFA Europa League, and received the Portuguese Golden Ball in 2012. He subsequently moved to Monaco in 2013, finishing the Ligue 1 season as the top assist provider and being named to the Team of the Year.

Following his transfer to Real Madrid in 2014, Rodríguez recorded 13 goals and 12 assists in 29 appearances during his debut season, earning the official La Liga Best Midfielder award. A comparative academic study conducted by the University of Extremadura and the Complutense University of Madrid, concluded that Rodríguez was the most efficient midfielder, having the highest average of goals and assists per match in the history of Real Madrid.In his following two seasons at the club, he lifted several trophies, including a La Liga and two UEFA Champions League titles.

Rodríguez was then sent on loan to Bayern Munich in 2017, where he was subsequently named to the Bundesliga Team of the Season and recognized among the league's best midfielders. After a brief return to Madrid, Rodríguez signed for Premier League club Everton in the summer of 2020 on a free transfer, where he stayed for one season. He has since had short stints at various clubs, including Al-Rayyan in Qatar, Olympiacos in Greece, São Paulo in Brazil, Rayo Vallecano in Spain, León in Mexico, and Minnesota United in the United States.

Rodríguez began his senior international career in 2011, debuting for Colombia at the age of 20. He went on to represent the country for fifteen years, earning 131 caps and subsequently becoming the nation's record appearance holder. He was part of Colombia's squads at the FIFA World Cup in 2014, 2018 and 2026; in 2014, he won the tournament's Golden Boot and was included in the All-Star Team, helping Colombia reach the quarter-finals for the first time. His round of 16 volley against Uruguay was also voted Goal of the Tournament and went on to win the FIFA Puskás Award for the best goal of 2014, marking the first time a World Cup goal received this accolade. He also recorded the highest scoring average for a midfielder in a single World Cup, averaging 1.2 goals per match.

Rodríguez additionally represented his nation at the Copa América in 2015, 2016, 2019 and 2024, winning a third-place medal in 2016 and reaching the final in 2024, the latter in which he set the record for most assists in a single edition and received the Golden Ball as the tournament's best player. Rodríguez is currently the second-highest assist provider in the history of CONMEBOL FIFA World Cup qualifiers as well, trailing only Brazil's Neymar. Also at the international level, he entered the top ten list of all-time assist providers in men's international football history, surpassing Brazil's Pelé.

During the decade of the 2010, across Europe's top five leagues, Rodríguez established himself as the midfielder with the highest average of goals and assists, as well as the highest volume of accurate passes in the final third. In 2014, the International Centre for Sports Studies ranked him as the second-best attacking midfielder in Europe.

== Club career ==
=== Envigado ===
Born in Cúcuta, Norte de Santander, Rodríguez spent his childhood in the city of Ibagué, Tolima. He was born to ex-footballer Wilson James Rodríguez Bedoya and Maria Del Pilar Rubio. Rodríguez started his professional career in 2006 with Colombian club Envigado. Although the club suffered relegation at the end of the year, he and Gio Moreno played key roles in helping the team secure promotion by winning the 2007 Primera B title on penalties. He became the second youngest Colombian player to start a professional match, playing his first match on 21 May 2006, at the age of 14.

=== Banfield ===
==== 2008 ====
In February 2008, Rodríguez was signed by Argentine team Banfield, and played a year with the club's youth teams. He made his first team debut on 7 February 2009 and became the youngest foreigner in Argentine football history in the process. He scored his first goal for the club on 27 February with a long range strike in a 3–1 victory over Rosario Central. He finished his first season with a goal in 11 appearances.

==== 2009 ====
In 2009, Rodríguez became a regular first-team player, featuring in every game of the Apertura 2009. At just 17, he became the youngest foreigner to score a goal in Argentina. His second goal for Banfield came on 26 September, when he scored with a strike into the top corner from outside of the area in an important 2–1 win against Newell's Old Boys, a victory that helped Banfield win the Argentine championship for the first time in the club's history.

In December 2009, Italian club Udinese planned to make a bid for Rodríguez for a reported €5 million after the 2010 Copa Libertadores. However, Banfield rejected the bid, labelling it as "insufficient". For the Clausura 2010, on 13 February 2010, Rodríguez scored a golazo in the match against arch-rivals Lanús with a left-footed lob to make the game 2–0 in the final minutes. After the game, daily sports website Diario Olé compared his playing and personal style to Cristiano Ronaldo and nicknamed him the "James Bond of Banfield".

==== 2010 ====
On 10 February 2010, Rodríguez scored his first Copa Libertadores goal in a 2–1 home victory over Mexican club Monarcas Morelia. He added to his glowing reputation a week later with a goal in a daunting victory over Copa Libertadores group rivals Deportivo Cuenca away from home, scoring the fourth goal of the 4–1 victory with a nice left-footed finish in the box. His wonderful scoring season continued with a brace in the Copa Libertadores group match away to Uruguayan club Nacional on 10 March. Rodríguez scored first with a diving header and then from the penalty spot in a 2–2 draw. The 18-year-old netted another goal against Brazilian club Internacional on 29 April 2010 in the first leg of the 2010 Copa Libertadores round 16, which Banfield won 3–1. This goal brought his tally to five goals in seven games. However, Rodríguez' international season ended in defeat as his team went down on away goals with a 0–2 defeat in Porto Alegre in the second leg, in which he was red carded for two fouls.

=== Porto ===
==== 2010–11 season ====
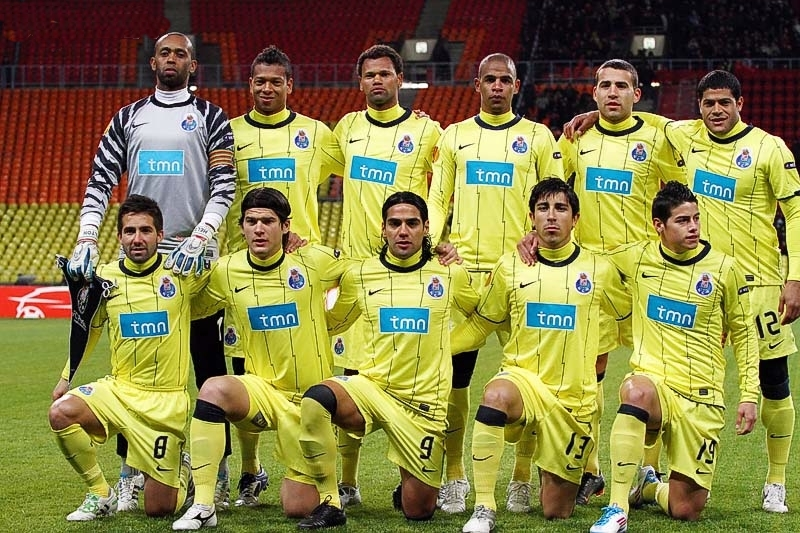
Rodríguez (front row, far right) with Porto during the 2010–11 UEFA Europa League

On 6 July 2010, Rodríguez was signed by Porto for €5.1 million, with 30% economic rights retained by other parties. He signed a four-year contract with a €30 million release clause. Porto later re-sold 10% economic rights to third parties. On 18 July, he played his first game and scored his first goal in a friendly against Ajax. In November, Porto sold 35% economic rights (half of 70%) to Gol Football Luxembourg, S.A.R.L. for €2.5 million.

On 15 December 2010, Rodríguez scored his first competitive goal during a 3–1 Europa League home victory against Bulgarian club CSKA Sofia. On 17 May, Porto bought the remaining 30% economic rights from Convergence Capital Partners B.V. for €2.25 million and once again hold more than half of the economic rights with 55%. He scored a hat-trick and assisted once against Vitória de Guimarães in the 2011 Taça de Portugal Final, which Porto won 6–2.

On 13 June, Rodríguez signed a new five-year contract in which the release clause increased to €45 million. He finished the 2010–11 season with six goals and eight assists in 31 appearances. He also took home four trophies: the Super Cup title, the league title, the Europa League title, and the Cup title as Porto had a historic season.

==== 2011–12 season ====
In the 2011–12 season, Rodríguez scored 14 goals for Porto and delivered 11 assists. In 2011, he won the LPFP Award for Breakthrough Player of 2011–12 Primeira Liga season at age 20, becoming the first Colombian player to do so. He is a two-time winner of the SJPF Player of the Month. He won the Portuguese Golden Ball award in 2012, becoming the second Colombian to win the award after Radamel Falcao as well as the youngest player ever to hold the honour. On 20 September 2011 in a league match against Feirense, he punched Rabiola and was subsequently dismissed, missing the match against Benfica.

==== 2012–13 season ====
In the 2012–13 season, Rodríguez was given the number 10 shirt and became a regular starter. Since fellow Colombians Radamel Falcao, Fredy Guarín and Brazilian Hulk left the club during the last two seasons, Rodríguez was able to start more regularly than before. In a match against Olhanense on 1 September, he scored a chip from a tight angle. In the same game, he assisted compatriot Jackson Martínez with a through ball for an eventual 3–2 win. He scored the team's third goal against Beira-Mar soon after assisting the first two goals in a 4–0 victory on 22 September.

In the 2012–13 UEFA Champions League group stage, he scored against French club Paris Saint-Germain in a 1–0 victory, allowing Porto to top their current group. A few days later, Rodríguez scored a penalty against rivals Sporting CP. Because of his great start to the 2012–13 season, he won the SJPF Player of the Month award for August/September. In the Champions League against Dinamo Kyiv on 24 October, he assisted Jackson Martínez to an eventual 3–2 home victory. He scored Porto's last two goals in a 5–0 win over Marítimo on 2 November. In the 90th minute against Braga, Rodríguez scored a goal in an eventual 2–0 away victory.

Prior to the second half of the season, he suffered a hamstring injury causing him to struggle to maintain fitness. In a match against Nacional on 5 January, he injured his hamstring once more and was subsequently substituted after the first half. The injury sidelined him for a month. On 1 February 2013, Porto bought back 35% economic rights of Rodríguez from Gol Football Luxembourg for €8.75 million (by selling 47.5% economic rights of Diego Reyes for €3.5 million), which Porto sold in November 2010 for €2.5 million.

Rodríguez made his return at the 70th minute in the 2–0 victory over Beira-Mar on 23 February, his first match since being injured for more than a month. In his second league match since his return, he assisted a goal against Rio Ave with a wonderful cross. On 8 March, he assisted a goal against Estoril from a corner in a 2–0 victory. It was Rodríguez' first start in two months. He did not start in the second leg of the Champions League match against Málaga until the second half when Porto was down to ten men after the dismiss of a defender. Porto lost the match and coach Vítor Pereira was greatly criticized and questioned why Rodríguez did not start sooner, considering that the player was a key member and Porto could have had a more solid team. Rodríguez expressed his disappointment, claiming to be "100%" in good health (as well as giving a performance with no struggles shown). However, he also expressed his respect and understanding to the coach's concern. Despite an exit from the Champions League, Rodríguez went on to become the second-most fouled player in the tournament that year.

Manchester United reportedly made a bid for €30 million to purchase Rodríguez, though Porto rejected the offer as being too low. He scored his first Taça da Liga goal, a penalty, in the 2012–13 Taça da Liga semi-final against Rio Ave. Porto won the match 4–0 and advanced to the final. In the final on 13 April, Porto lost 1–0 to Braga, with Rodríguez playing 75 minutes. Five days before the final, he gave a man of the match performance against Braga, scoring the first goal and assisting two in a 3–1 victory.

In the final match of the season against Paços de Ferreira on 19 May, Rodríguez was tripped inside the box and secured a penalty that was later scored by Lucho Gonzalez, which contributed to the 2–0 victory that led to Porto's third consecutive league title. In all competitions that season, he scored 13 goals and provided 15 assists in 32 appearances. Winning the league title meant that Rodríguez, at 21, won his eighth trophy since joining the club three years prior.

=== Monaco ===
On 25 May 2013, it was announced that Rodríguez had joined Monaco for a transfer fee of €45 million, the second most expensive transfer in Portuguese football behind former teammate Hulk. Rodríguez subsequently signed a five-year contract that was set to keep him at the club until 2018. This transfer made him not only one of the most expensive transfers in the club's history, but in Ligue 1 history as well, along as one of the highest in world football. Rodríguez made his Monaco debut against Bordeaux, a game Monaco went on to win 2–0. He then missed Monaco's second league match to avoid a possible injury. On 5 October against Saint-Étienne, Rodríguez gave a man of the match performance by assisting both goals in a 2–1 victory.

He finally scored his first goal for the club with a free-kick in a 2–0 win over Rennes. Rodríguez scored another goal in the next match in the fourth minute against Nice, a game Monaco won 3–0. He began the 2014 calendar year by making his Coupe de France debut in a match against Vannes, where he both assisted and scored a goal in a 3–2 victory. His first double at Monaco came in the match against Bastia, a 2–0 Monaco victory.

In the French media, Rodríguez was referred to as "perhaps" the best footballer in Ligue 1 due to his impressive debut season with Monaco, although he stated that he still required more time in the league to fully adapt. Following the international break, he scored his first penalty for Monaco against Sochaux in a 2–1 win. He ended his debut season without a trophy, though nonetheless helped Monaco secure a spot in the following season's UEFA Champions League. On an individual level, he earned a spot in the star Ligue 1 XI, and led Ligue 1 in assists for the season.

=== Real Madrid ===
"I've always followed Real Madrid and always dreamed of playing here [...] I will never forget this day [...] I know I am under a lot of pressure, but I am happy to face it."

— Rodríguez on his move to Real Madrid

In a post-match interview during the 2014 FIFA World Cup, Rodríguez stated his "love", "admiration" and "passion" for Real Madrid, saying that it would be a "life's dream" to play for them after his performances aroused rumors linking him to the Spanish club.

On 22 July 2014, Rodríguez signed a six-year contract with the Spanish club for an undisclosed fee, which was reported to be approximately €80 million. At the time, this was the fourth-most expensive transfer in the world, the third-most expensive in Madrid's history, and the most expensive Colombian after surpassing Radamel Falcao's €60 million transfer in 2013. The amount spent on his transfer fee led many to call Rodríguez as a Galáctico after he was given the number 10 shirt worn by Madrid legends such as Luís Figo and Ferenc Puskás.

Rodríguez was greeted by a 45,000 attendance during his presentation. The Colombian ambassador in Madrid made a speech at the event and carried a message from Colombian President Juan Manuel Santos that Rodríguez was changing the history of Colombian football and that the entire nation was behind him. Real Madrid President Florentino Pérez followed with a speech of his own, stating that he welcomed Rodríguez, a "lover" and "long supporter" of the club who would never forget the day he made his dream a reality.

==== 2014–17: Debut season success, La Liga and UEFA Champions League titles ====
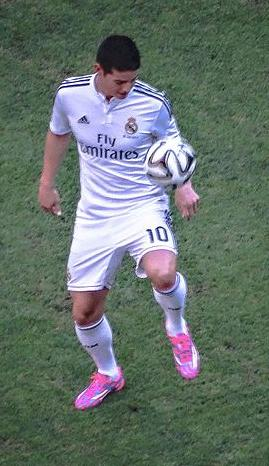
Rodríguez during his presentation as a Real Madrid ahead of the 2014–15 season

Rodríguez made his debut in the UEFA Super Cup at the Cardiff City Stadium against Sevilla, in which Real Madrid won 2–0. He played 72 minutes before being replaced by Isco. On 19 August, Rodríguez scored his first goal for Real Madrid against Atlético Madrid in the first leg of the Spanish Super Cup after coming on as a substitute for Cristiano Ronaldo at half-time. Rodríguez made his Champions League debut for Real in the group stage opening match against Basel, where he scored the fourth goal in a 5–1 victory. He then scored his first league goal days later against Deportivo La Coruña, where he also supplied an assist in an 8–2 victory. He scored a brace in a 4–0 win at Granada on 1 November; his first goal was a dipping volley from a poor angle.

In the match against Sevilla in which he scored the opening goal, Rodríguez experienced a fracture on the fifth metatarsal in his right foot after being fouled. The injury required surgery and he was out of action for two months. He returned on 5 April in the match against Granada, where he assisted two goals in a 9–1 victory before being subbed at the 60th minute. Days later, he scored his first goal since his injury against Rayo Vallecano in a 2–0 victory.

After being left on the bench for his team's season opener, a scoreless draw against Sporting Gijón, Rodríguez made his first contribution of the season by giving a man of the match performance against Real Betis. The player scored with both a spectacular free-kick and bicycle kick and provided an assist for Gareth Bale. On 8 September 2015, during an international friendly match against Peru, he collided with Peruvian player Juan Manuel Vargas, and though he initially appeared able to continue, Rodríguez was removed from the game as a precautionary measure. He was diagnosed with a thigh muscle tear, and didn't return to training until 27 October. He played his first match since the injury on 8 November, scoring in a 3–2 loss to Sevilla. On 31 January 2016, he scored and assisted Karim Benzema's goal in a 6–0 thrashing of Espanyol. On 8 March, he scored his first and only goal of the 2015–16 UEFA Champions League, in a 2–0 victory against Roma to help his club get into the quarter-finals. His team eventually won the Champions League, with Rodríguez making five appearances.

Rodríguez made 22 appearances when Madrid won the 2016–17 La Liga, and six when Madrid won the 2016–17 UEFA Champions League. Despite scoring 11 goals, (including braces against Granada, Deportivo, and Sevilla), as well as providing 13 assists, he failed to gain more playing time under Zidane even with his influence on the pitch, leading him to request a loan transfer for more playing time.

==== 2017–19: Loan to Bayern Munich ====
"He has the ability to see the hole where others cannot find it. This has already been shown in several games this season. His vision of the game is reminiscent of what Michael Laudrup had and the great beneficiaries are his teammates."

— Marca writer Justin Sherman, regarding Rodríguez' first season with Bayern

On 11 July 2017, it was announced that Rodríguez had been loaned to Bayern Munich on a two-year long deal. Bayern paid Real Madrid €13 million as a loan fee for the two season-long loan. With his loan deal to Bayern, he reunited with his old Madrid manager Carlo Ancelotti. Bayern had the option to buy Rodríguez for €42 million at the end of the loan period. He scored his first goal of his loan spell in a 3–0 away win over Schalke 04. After a slow start to his Bayern career, mainly due to an injury in preseason, Rodríguez rediscovered his form after Jupp Heynckes was hired as Bayern's manager in October as the club sacked Ancelotti.

On 2 April 2018, Bayern's CEO, Karl-Heinz Rummenigge, thanked Ancelotti for bringing Rodríguez to Bayern. "It was a very, very good transfer and I have to thank Carlo Ancelotti once again," Rummenigge said.

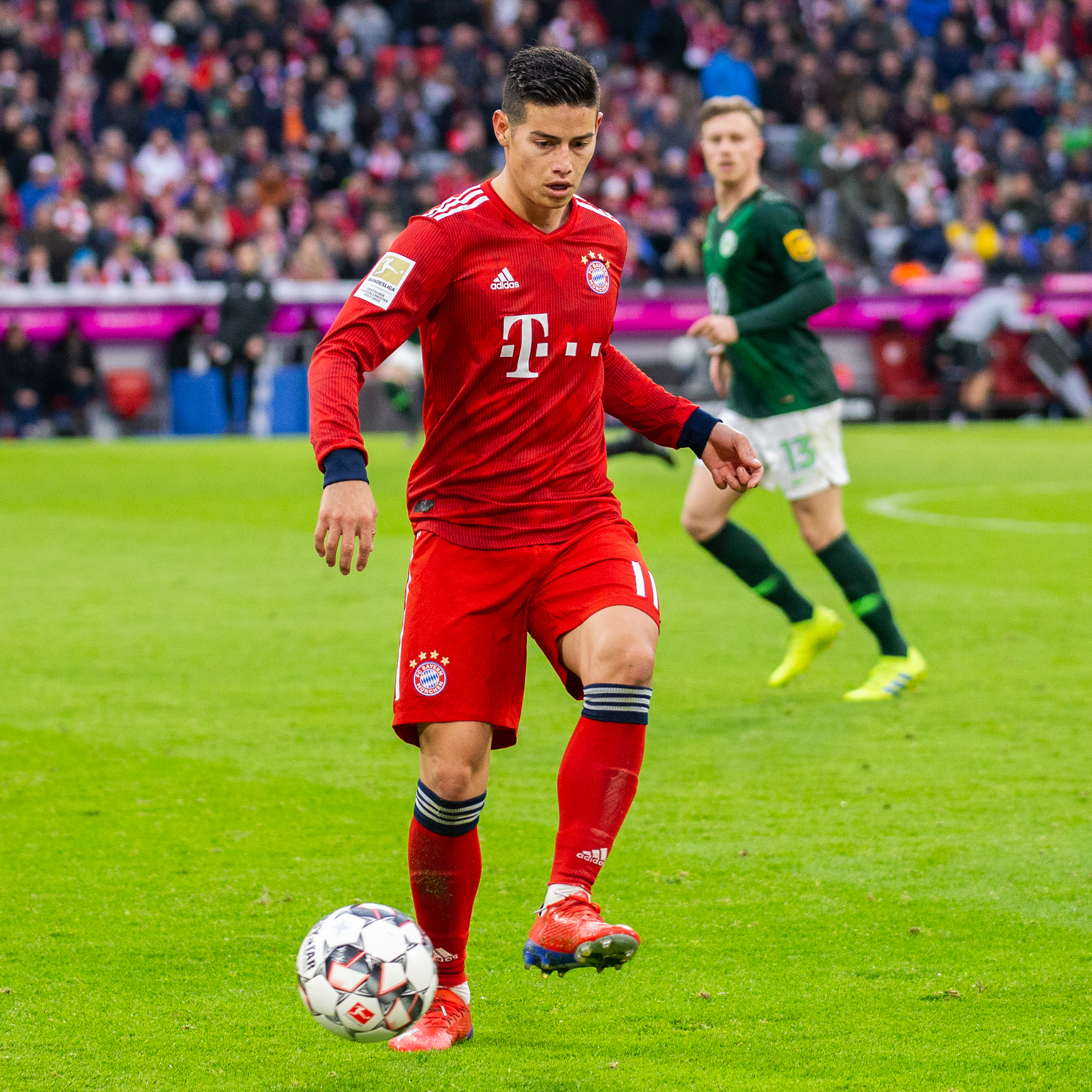
Rodríguez playing for Bayern Munich against Wolfsburg in March 2019

In the semi-finals of the 2017–18 UEFA Champions League season, Rodríguez scored the equalizing goal in a 2–2 draw against his parent club at the Santiago Bernabéu, but Bayern failed to reach the final as they lost 3–4 on aggregate. However, Rodríguez went on to win the 2017–18 Bundesliga title with Bayern, credited as a key member behind their title defense for his contribution of 7 goals and 11 assists in 23 Bundesliga appearances.

On 15 September 2018, Rodríguez scored his opening goal of the season in a 3–1 victory over Bayer Leverkusen. On 17 March 2019, he scored three goals in a 6–0 league win over Mainz 05, his first hat-trick since 2011, with Porto. On 18 May, he won his second Bundesliga title as Bayern finished two points above Dortmund with 78 points. A week later, he won his first DFB-Pokal as Bayern defeated RB Leipzig 3–0 in the 2019 DFB-Pokal Final. Rodríguez did not appear in the match as he was out injured. He appeared in 28 matches and scored seven goals in all competitions. On 5 June, it was announced that Bayern Munich would not pick up the buy option and he would return to Real Madrid.

==== 2019–20: Final season and departure ====
After his return to Madrid, Rodríguez made eight appearances during the league season, as Real Madrid won the 2019–20 La Liga.

=== Everton ===
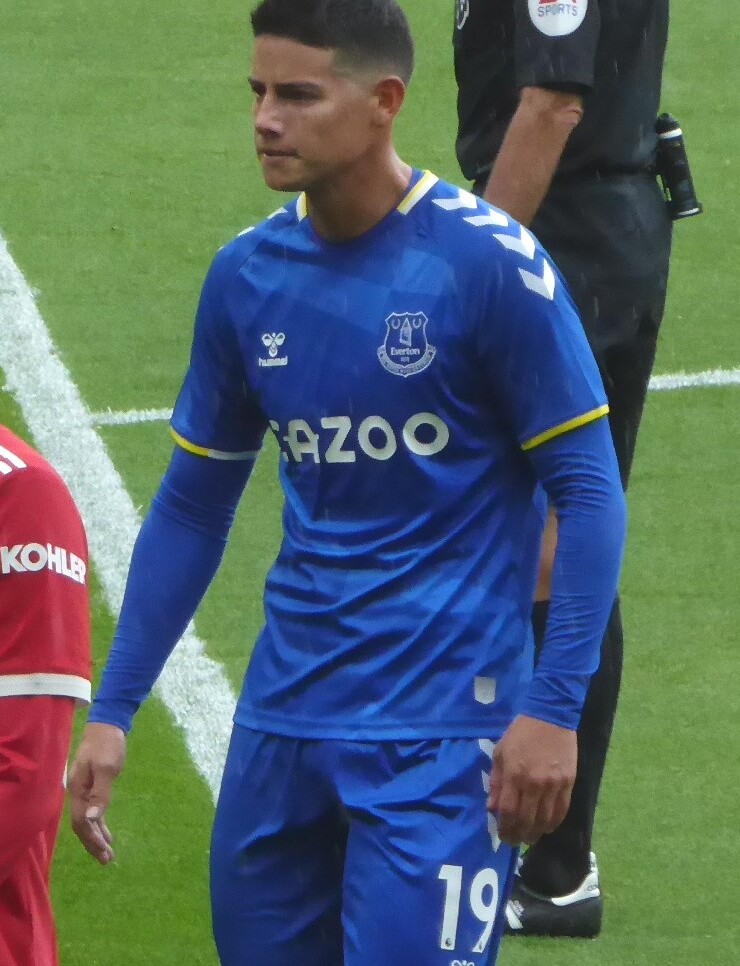
Rodríguez during a Premier League match against Manchester United in August 2021

On 7 September 2020, Rodríguez joined Premier League club Everton on a free transfer and signed a two-year deal, with a club option for a third season. The deal once again reunited him with manager Carlo Ancelotti. He made his debut later that month in a 1–0 away win against Tottenham Hotspur in their first game of the 2020–21 Premier League season. The following week he scored his first goal for Everton on his home debut, a 5–2 league win against West Bromwich Albion. He scored two goals and provided an assist for his international teammate Yerry Mina in a 4–2 victory at Goodison Park against Brighton & Hove Albion on 3 October 2020. He added to his goal tally against Manchester United in a 3–3 draw at Old Trafford on 6 February 2021.

=== Al-Rayyan ===
On 22 September 2021, Rodríguez joined Al-Rayyan for an undisclosed fee. On 17 October 2021, Rodríguez made his debut for Al-Rayyan, in a 3–0 loss against Al-Duhail. He scored his first goal for the team against Al-Sailiya on 26 October 2021. On 15 September 2022, Al-Rayyan and the player parted ways.

=== Olympiacos ===
On 15 September 2022, Rodríguez joined Greek Super League champions Olympiacos on a free transfer. Upon arrival, Rodríguez was handed the number 10 jersey, previously worn by Rony Lopes who had departed to play on loan for Ligue 1 side Troyes. He made his league debut on 18 September as a starter against Aris Thessaloniki, a match in which his team lost 2–1 despite being up a goal for the majority of the match. On 13 April 2023, Rodríguez' contract with Olympiacos was terminated by mutual consent.

=== São Paulo ===
On 29 July 2023, Rodríguez joined São Paulo, signing a two-year contract. He made his debut for the club in a 1–1 draw with Flamengo on 13 August. Despite making mostly substitute appearances as he was coming from four months off the pitch, he was getting regular playing time under manager Dorival Júnior in the 2023 season, making 14 appearances out of a possible 25 until an injury suffered in training left him out for the final three matches of the season. However, with the arrival of Luis Zubeldía, Rodríguez began struggling for playing time, playing less than 200 minutes over 8 appearances in the first half of the 2024 season, with coach Zubeldia preferring other players in his position instead. In July 2024 his contract with São Paulo was terminated by mutual consent, with Rodríguez making 22 appearances and scoring two goals in his spell with the Brazilian club.

=== Rayo Vallecano ===
Rodríguez joined La Liga club Rayo Vallecano in August 2024 as a free agent. He made a total of seven appearances in the 2024–25 season for a total of 205 minutes and provided an assist in Rayo's Copa del Rey victory over Unionistas. His contract with Rayo was terminated by mutual consent in January 2025 after only four months and seven appearances with the club.

=== León ===
Following his departure from Rayo, there was speculation about a transfer to Junior, with club president Fuad Char saying that he would be paid one of the biggest salaries in Colombian football. On 13 January 2025, Liga MX club León announced Rodríguez' signing following his departure from Rayo. On 26 January, he netted his first goal from a penalty in a 1–0 victory over Juárez. However, his contract with the club was not renewed and would become a free agent at the end of the same year.

=== Minnesota United ===
On 6 February 2026, Rodríguez signed with Major League Soccer club Minnesota United on a deal through to June 2026, with a club option through to December 2026. On 13 May 2026, Minnesota United announced Rodríguez would depart the club to prepare for the 2026 FIFA World Cup.

=== Atlético Nacional ===
On 12 September 2026, Rodríguez joined Atlético Nacional, marking his return to Colombian football.

== International career ==
=== Youth ===
Rodríguez was part of the Colombia U-17 team that finished runners-up in the 2007 South American Under-17 Championships, where he scored three goals. He also helped Colombia advance to the knockout stages during the 2007 FIFA U-17 World Cup, where they eventually lost to the winners of the tournament Nigeria. He was also part of the Colombia under-20 squad in three youth tournaments during 2011: the Toulon Tournament, the South American U-20 Championship and the U-20 World Cup that was held in his homeland Colombia. Rodríguez scored two goals and provided three assists during the 2011 Toulon Tournament. This show led him to being voted as the MVP of the tournament where Colombia won the final by defeating France in a penalty shootout. Rodríguez scored one of the penalties in the shootout.

During the 2011 South American U-20 Championship, he provided three assists. During the 2011 U-20 World Cup, he was named captain of the U20 squad due to his impressive leadership and talent. By scoring three goals and providing three assists in the tournament, he gained international attention as a promising star, especially during his performance in the 4–1 victory against France where he scored a penalty and provided an assist.

=== Senior ===
==== 2014 World Cup qualification and friendlies ====
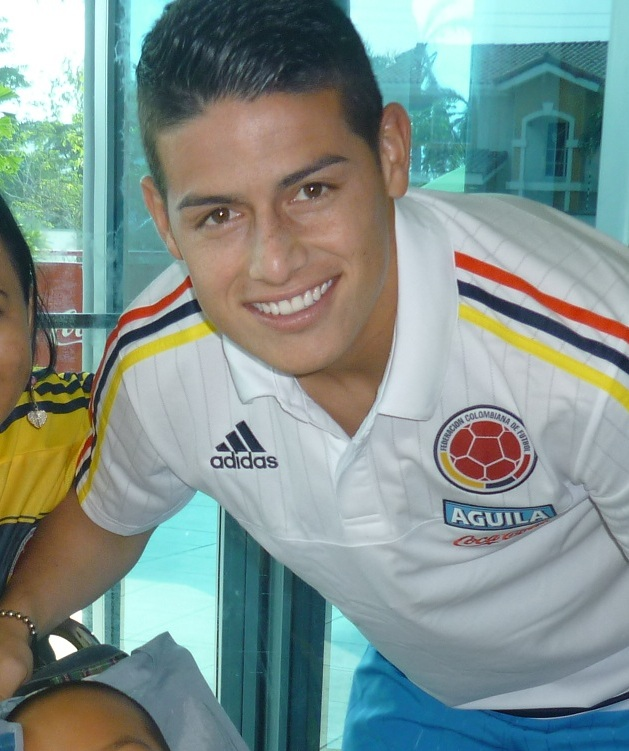
Rodríguez with Colombia in March 2013

On 29 September 2011, Rodríguez received his first call-up to the Colombia senior side for a match against Bolivia on 11 October 2011. He was selected as the man of match due to his performance, including the initiation of the goal scored in the last minute by his former Porto teammate Radamel Falcao which gave Colombia a 2–1 win in La Paz. Under new manager José Pékerman, he played a crucial part in setting up both goals in a 2–0 friendly victory over Mexico. He scored his first goal for Colombia against Peru, and Colombia went on to win 1–0 in Lima in Pekerman's first competitive match.

Rodríguez assisted two goals in a row from 1–0 to 3–0 In the World Cup qualifying match against Uruguay that eventually ended 4–0. He scored a stunning volley from a 30-yard free kick against Chile, leveling the game to an eventual 3–1 away victory boosting Colombia to the second place in the qualifying stages. In the match against Paraguay, he set up the plays leading towards both goals in a 2–0 victory. In Colombia's last international friendly of the year, he assisted the sole goal, allowing Colombia to tie with 2014 World Cup hosts Brazil 1–1. Rodríguez played his first match of 2013 in the second half of the CONMEBOL qualifiers against Bolivia, where he gave a man of the match performance in a 5–0 victory. He set up the second goal thanks to a free kick that he took.

Playing against South American leaders Argentina, Rodríguez suffered an injury in the 30th minute forcing him to be substituted. While the injury was not serious, he was rested and therefore missed the game against Peru days later. He made a good comeback when he scored the winning goal in a 1–0 victory over Ecuador during the final stages of the world cup qualifiers. In a tough match against Chile, he drew both penalties that equalized Colombia from a 1–3 to a 3–3. This drew allowed Colombia to return to the World Cup for the first time in 16 years. Days later, he assisted the first goal with a free-kick while setting up the second in a 2–1 away victory over Paraguay.

Rodríguez continued his play-making form by assisting the first goal and setting up the second against Belgium in a 2–0 victory. He was later voted man of the match. A few days later, He was praised once more as the man of the match in a 0–0 draw against the Netherlands. Rodríguez started in Colombia's opening match of 2014 and scored a penalty against Tunisia in a 1–1 draw at Estadio Cornellá-El Prat on 5 March 2014. In the last friendly before the World Cup, he scored yet another penalty against Jordan in a 3–0 victory.

==== 2014 World Cup ====
"For me, special talents are those who do things that are completely out of the ordinary. Diego Maradona, Lionel Messi, Luis Suárez, James Rodriguez – they do things because they have certain gifts that make them special. I believe he's the best player at the World Cup and I don't think I'm exaggerating; he's a young player. We tried to limit his influence, but he kept going and made his presence felt. Hopefully he'll continue to progress, because he's very young. Football needs players with these characteristics."

— Óscar Tabárez on Rodríguez

On 2 June 2014, Rodríguez was named in Colombia's 23-man squad for the 2014 FIFA World Cup and assigned the number 10 shirt. In the team's opening match of the tournament, he set up the first two goals, scored a last-minute goal with a low shot to seal a 3–0 victory over Greece and was named man of the match by FIFA. In the second match, he continued his form by scoring with a header and setting up a second goal for Juan Fernando Quintero in a 2–1 victory over Ivory Coast and was once again elected as man of the match. In the final group stage match against Japan, Rodríguez came on as a second-half substitute and assisted two Jackson Martínez goals before scoring the final goal in a 4–1 victory. At the end of the group stage, he was ranked as the best performing player at the tournament by FIFA.

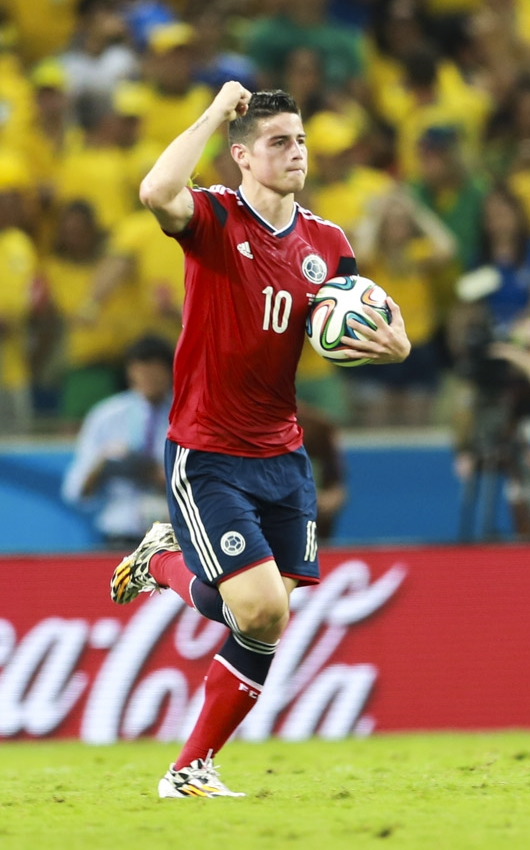
Rodríguez celebrates after scoring a penalty against Brazil at the 2014 World Cup

On 28 June, Rodríguez scored both goals to defeat Uruguay 2–0 at the Maracanã in the round of 16, taking Colombia to its first ever World Cup quarter-finals. These goals made him the first player to score in all of his team's opening matches since Ronaldo and Rivaldo in 2002. His volleyed opening goal was described as "one of the greatest goals the World Cup has ever seen" by opposing manager Óscar Tabárez, who also called Rodríguez "the best player in the World Cup". Because of his performance against the Uruguayans, he was named by FIFA as man of the match for the third time in four matches. The volley was later voted as the best goal in the tournament by more than four million people on FIFA's website and won the FIFA Puskás Award for the best goal of the year. In the quarter-final against Brazil, he scored his sixth goal of the tournament, a penalty in Colombia's 2–1 defeat.

A tearful Rodríguez was consoled by Brazil's David Luiz and stated: "He (David) told me I was a good player. The truth is that having so many superstars hug me did make me happy. We have to raise our heads now and thank Colombia for their support. We are sad because we wanted to keep going and set new records. We gave everything to reach the semi-final, but we have to be proud because we played a great side. I'm crying because we gave everything. We're sad but we also have to feel proud because we left our skin out there." Luiz and Rodríguez also exchanged jerseys. Rodríguez received a standing ovation from the home crowd, ending his first World Cup campaign with six goals and two assists in five matches. On 11 July, he was named on the ten-man shortlist for FIFA's Golden Ball award for the tournament's best player. He then won the Golden Boot as the tournament's top goalscorer despite being eliminated in the quarter finals. Due to his performances, he was named in the World Cup All Star XI and was also listed in the Cup's star XI by Castrol's index rating system in FIFA's website. Argentina legend Diego Maradona argued that Rodríguez, rather than Lionel Messi, should have won the tournament's Golden Ball award.

==== 2015 Copa América, Copa América Centenario, 2018 World Cup qualification and friendlies ====
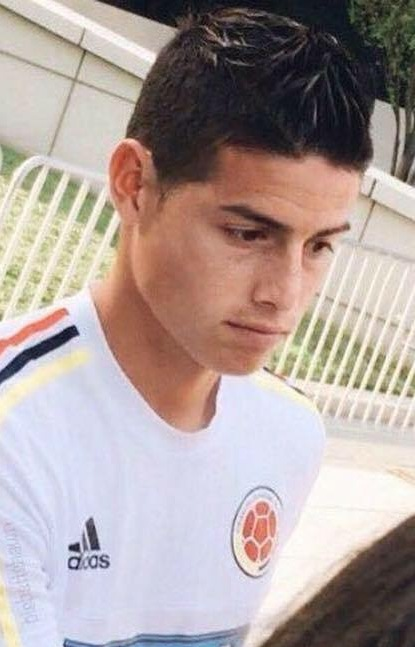
Rodríguez before training in Chicago for the Copa América Centenario in June 2016

Rodríguez was called up to represent Colombia at the 2015 Copa América in Chile, where his team was eliminated 5–4 on penalties by eventual finalists Argentina on 27 June, following a 0–0 draw. The following summer, Rodríguez joined Colombia's squad for the Copa América Centenario and was named the team's captain. On 3 June, he started in Colombia's opening 2–0 win against tournament hosts the United States, scoring his team's second goal from the penalty spot although he was forced off early due to an injury. It was initially feared that he would be unable to feature in his nation's second group match against Paraguay, but he recovered in time to start the match, setting up Colombia's first goal, and later scoring one himself in a 2–1 win which sealed his team a place in the quarter-finals of the tournament. Colombia would then lose in the semi-finals against eventual and defending champions Chile, before securing a third-place victory against the host nation for Colombia's best result since 2001.

Rodríguez made his first direct contribution towards qualification, scoring a goal in a heated duel against Copa America champions Chile, securing a 1–1 away draw. In early 2016, he provided both a goal and assist in a difficult away match against Bolivia resulting in a 2–3 victory. Days later, he assisted another goal in a 3–1 home victory against Ecuador. In early August, he contributed both a goal and an assist in Colombia's 2–0 victory against Venezuela.

Starting off 2017, Rodríguez scored a late dramatic goal against a defensive Bolivia after missing an earlier penalty. The 1–0 home victory allowed Colombia to move to 4th place within the qualification group. Days later, he scored and provided a goal in an impressive 0–2 victory in Ecuador. For his first friendly of the year, Rodríguez assisted Radamel Falcao's goal from the corner against European giants Spain. The game would end 2–2. Days later against Cameroon, Rodríguez both provided and scored a goal in a dominating 4–0 victory. For the last qualification match of the 2018 World Cup, Rodríguez scored a crucial away goal against South American rival Peru, resulting in a 1–1 draw and granting Colombia the last automatic qualification spot at fourth place. His last contribution of 2017 for Colombia would be an assist against South Korea, which ended 2–1. Colombia's World Cup preparations in 2018 began against World Cup favorites France, where Rodríguez provided two assists towards a comeback of a 2–0 score to a 2–3 victory. This marked the first victory in Colombia's history over France.

==== 2018 World Cup, 2019 Copa América and 2021 Copa América ====
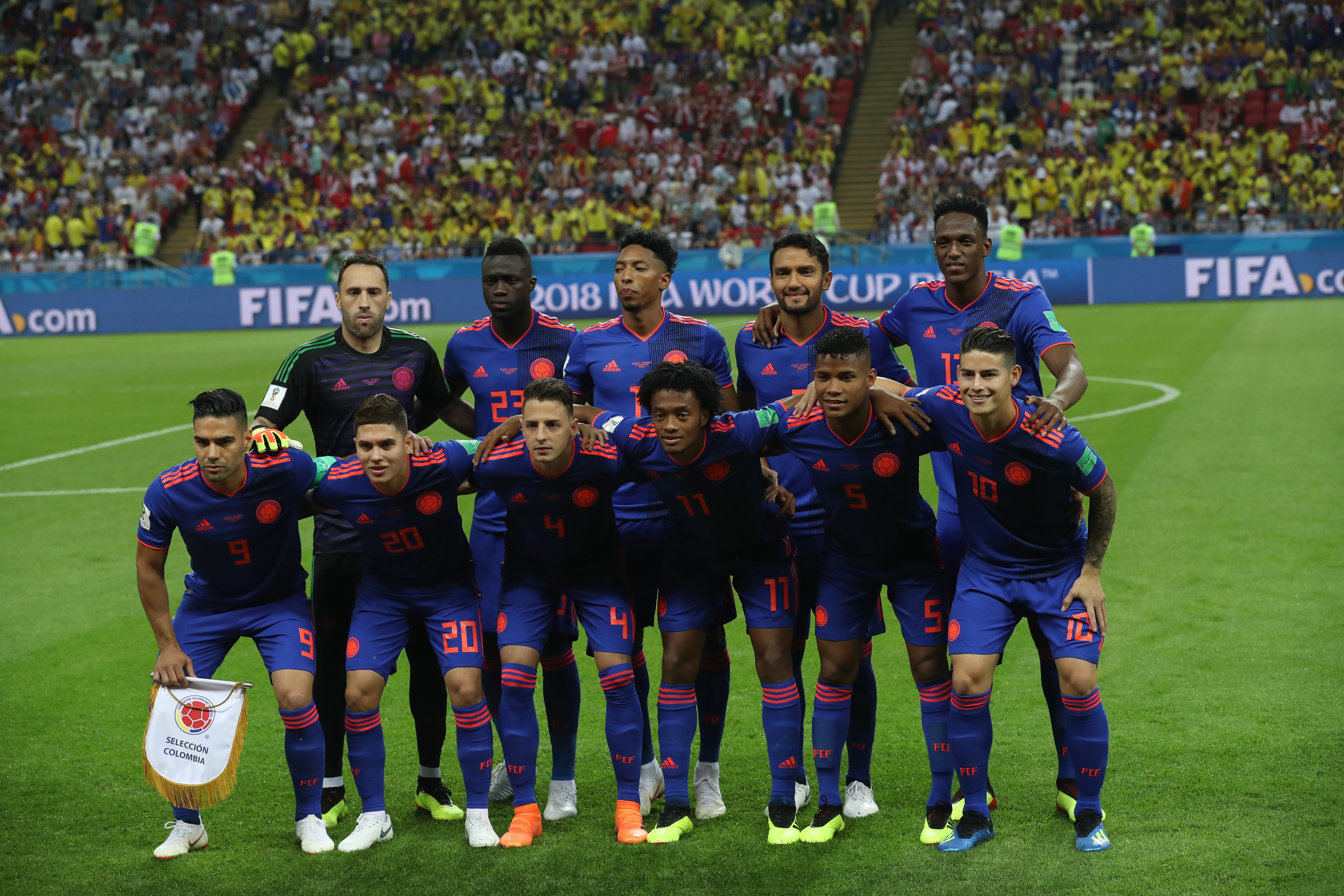
Rodríguez (front row, far right) with Colombia before 2018 World Cup match against Poland

On 4 June 2018, Rodríguez was selected in Colombia's 23-man squad for the 2018 FIFA World Cup in Russia. He did not start in the opening game against Japan after a calf injury during training. He came as a substitute in the 59th minute for Juan Quintero. On 24 June 2018, he provided two assists in a 3–0 victory over Poland and was named as the Man of the Match. Rodríguez had to be substituted in the 30th minute in the final match of the group stage against Senegal due to the injury. He played in all three matches during the group phase, but was forced to sit out of Colombia's last 16 match against England. Colombia lost 4–3 on penalties against England and were eliminated from the World Cup. He was unable to score in those three matches.

On 30 May 2019, Rodríguez was included in the 23-man final Colombia squad for the 2019 Copa América. In the quarter-finals of the tournament against defending champions Chile on 28 June, following a 0–0 draw after regulation time, he scored in the resulting penalty shoot-out; however, Colombia were defeated 5–4 and were eliminated from the competition. On 28 May 2021, Rodríguez was ruled out of the squad for the 2021 Copa América due to his lack of conditioning, i.e. for not having the optimal physical level, as he had recently been recovering from injury.

==== 2022 World Cup qualification and 2024 Copa América ====
After Colombia's failure to qualify for the 2022 FIFA World Cup, Rodríguez admitted that he was uncertain about his future with the team. "I don't know what's coming regarding the next phases, I don't know if I'm going to be there or not," he told Diario Sport. "What I do know is that it breaks my heart to lose, it bothers me not qualifying and this can't happen again." On 15 June 2024, Rodríguez earned his 100th international cap in a 3–0 friendly win over Bolivia. On 21 June, he was selected in the 26-man squad for the 2024 Copa América. In the quarter-final match against Panama, he scored a penalty and provided two assists in the first half of a 5–0 victory. In the semi-final clash against Uruguay, he provided the assist from a corner kick for Jefferson Lerma's winner in a 1–0 victory to send his national team to the final. This assist was his sixth at the tournament, which allowed Rodríguez to surpass Messi's record for the most assists in a single edition of Copa América.

==== 2026 World Cup and retirement ====
Rodríguez was selected in Colombia's 26-man squad for the 2026 FIFA World Cup, becoming the eighth Colombian player to appear in three FIFA World Cup tournaments. In Colombia's second group stage match on 23 June, he made his tenth World Cup appearance in a 1–0 victory over DR Congo, equalling the record for most World Cup appearances by a Colombian player that had previously been set by Freddy Rincón and Carlos Valderrama. Four days later, he became the outright World Cup record holder for his nation after featuring in a goalless draw with Portugal that secured Colombia top spot in the group. On 7 July, Rodríguez made his 131st international appearance for Colombia in their round of 16 match against Switzerland, surpassing the all-time national record previously held by goalkeeper David Ospina. However, his side's World Cup campaign would also end after being defeated on penalties.

On 15 September 2026, Rodríguez announced his retirement from international football.

== Style of play ==
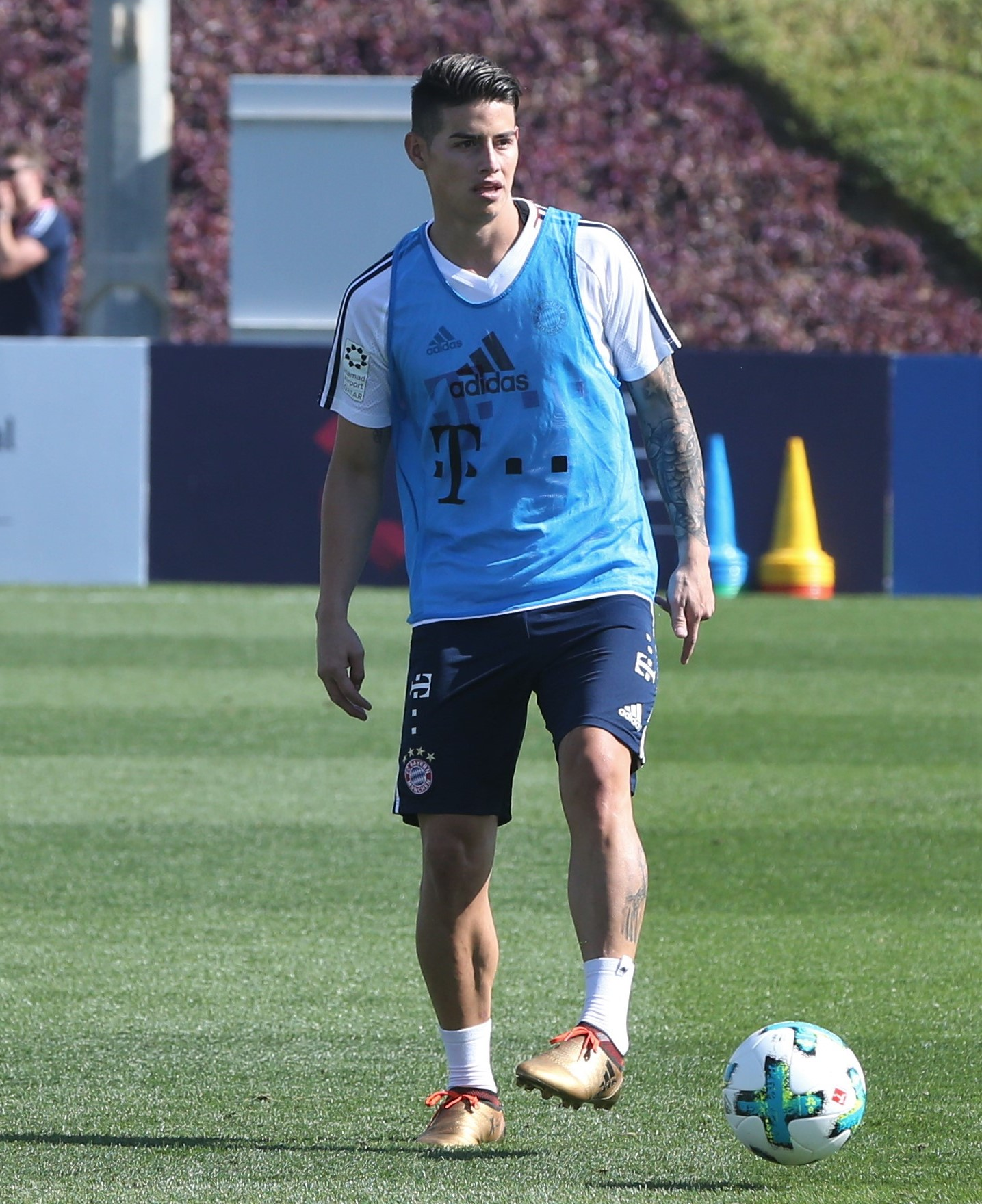
Rodríguez training with Bayern Munich in January 2018

Once considered to be among the best young players in the world, Rodríguez is a versatile footballer who can play in several positions across the midfield or front-line, having played as a playmaker, winger, and central midfielder for both club and country, although he has stated in interviews that his preferred role is as an attacking midfielder behind the strikers. Praised for his pace, technical skills, vision, and his ability to create chances for teammates as an advanced playmaker, Rodríguez' performances as a classic number 10 have led to comparisons with the famous Colombian footballer Carlos Valderrama; Valderrama himself declared Rodríguez as his "successor".

Although naturally left-footed, Rodríguez has shown ambidexterity in his dribbling and style of play. His goal scoring abilities were a highlight of the 2014 FIFA World Cup, where he managed to claim the Golden Boot despite Colombia's elimination in the quarter finals following a 2–1 loss to Brazil. He is also an accurate free kick taker, and a goal threat from anywhere on the pitch. This has made Rodríguez recognized for his unpredictability, as noted by Marca writer Justin Sherman: "One of the differences that James has with other players is that, apart from being very good outside the area, he is also good inside. He has the qualities of a No. 9 and is capable of finishing with a shot from the head or with either foot with great effectiveness."

Statistical data from 2015 to 2019 places Rodríguez as one of the best-performing attacking midfielders during the period. An academic study of applied economics published in the journal Omega analysed the historic performance of elite football players over a 70-year period, determining through analytical and statistical productivity models that Rodríguez ranked as the most efficient midfielder in the history of Real Madrid. On a per-minute basis at Bayern Munich, he ranked second in offensive productivity for the team in both of his seasons there, trailing only Robert Lewandowski. He also served as a primary progressive catalyst for the squad, according to performance data.

== Personal life ==
In 2015, Forbes estimated that Rodríguez' annual income was $29 million. Rodríguez married volleyball player Daniela Ospina, sister of Colombian goalkeeper David Ospina, in 2011. They met while Rodríguez was playing at Banfield. The two have a daughter, born in May 2013. On 27 July 2017, it was announced that the couple was in the process of divorcing. In October 2019, Rodríguez had a second child, a son, born to a surrogate in Medellín. Rodríguez is Catholic. He acquired Spanish citizenship in 2019.

=== Sponsorships ===
During his early days playing in South America, Rodríguez was approached by Adidas head scout Claus Peter Meyer. He featured occasionally in various adverts for Adidas as well as the Colombian beverage "Pony Malta", Nestlé drink "Milo", and the shampoo Clear. After the 2014 World Cup, where he won the Golden Boot as the tournament's top goal scorer with six goals, Adidas took advantage of Rodríguez' increased exposure and issued him his own custom gold boots to celebrate his achievement and increase the brand's on-pitch association with their new star asset.

== Career statistics ==
=== Club ===
As of match played 14 November 2026

Appearances and goals by club, season and competition
Club	Season	League			National cup (Note: Includes Taça de Portugal, Coupe de France, Copa del Rey, DFB-Pokal, FA Cup, Amir of Qatar Cup, Greek Cup, U.S. Open Cup)		League cup (Note: Includes Taça da Liga, Coupe de la Ligue, EFL Cup)		Continental		Other		Total	
Club	Season	Division	Apps	Goals	Apps	Goals	Apps	Goals	Apps	Goals	Apps	Goals	Apps	Goals
Envigado	2007	Categoría Primera B	8	0	—		—		—		—		8	0
Envigado	2008	Categoría Primera A	22	9	—		—		—		—		22	9
Envigado	Total		30	9	—		—		—		—		30	9
Banfield	2008–09	Argentine Primera División	11	1	—		—		—		—		11	1
Banfield	2009–10	Argentine Primera División	30	4	—		—		8 (Note: Appearances in Copa Libertadores)	5	—		38	9
Banfield	Total		41	5	—		—		8	5	—		49	10
Porto	2010–11	Primeira Liga	15	2	5	3	2	0	9 (Note: Appearances in UEFA Europa League)	1	—		31	6
Porto	2011–12	Primeira Liga	26	13	1	0	3	0	8 (Note: Six appearances and one goal in UEFA Champions League, two appearances in UEFA Europa League)	1	—		38	14
Porto	2012–13	Primeira Liga	24	10	2	0	3	1	8 (Note: Appearances in UEFA Champions League)	1	1 (Note: Appearance in Supertaça Cândido de Oliveira)	0	38	12
Porto	Total		65	25	8	3	8	1	25	3	1	0	107	32
Monaco	2013–14	Ligue 1	34	9	3	1	1	0	—		—		38	10
Real Madrid	2014–15	La Liga	29	13	4	2	—		9	1	4 (Note: One appearance in UEFA Super Cup, two appearances and one goal in Supercopa de España, one appearance in FIFA Club World Cup)	1	46	17
Real Madrid	2015–16	La Liga	26	7	1	0	—		5	1	—		32	8
Real Madrid	2016–17	La Liga	22	8	3	3	—		6	0	2 (Note: One appearance in UEFA Super Cup, one appearance in FIFA Club World Cup)	0	33	11
Real Madrid	2019–20	La Liga	8	1	3	0	—		2	0	1 (Note: Appearance in Supercopa de España)	0	14	1
Real Madrid	Total		85	29	11	5	—		22	2	7	1	125	37
Bayern Munich (loan)	2017–18	Bundesliga	23	7	4	0	—		12	1	0	0	39	8
Bayern Munich (loan)	2018–19	Bundesliga	20	7	3	0	—		5	0	0	0	28	7
Bayern Munich (loan)	Total		43	14	7	0	—		17	1	0	0	67	15
Everton	2020–21	Premier League	23	6	2	0	1	0	—		—		26	6
Al-Rayyan	2021–22	Qatar Stars League	12	4	3	1	0	0	0	0	—		15	5
Al-Rayyan	2022–23	Qatar Stars League	1	0	—		—		—		—		1	0
Al-Rayyan	Total		13	4	3	1	0	0	0	0	—		16	5
Olympiacos	2022–23	Super League Greece	20	5	3	0	—		0	0	—		23	5
São Paulo	2023	Série A	12	1	0	0	—		2 (Note: Appearances in Copa Sudamericana)	0	—		14	1
São Paulo	2024	Série A	2	0	0	0	—		2	0	4 (Note: Appearances in Campeonato Paulista)	1	8	1
São Paulo	Total		14	1	0	0	—		4	0	4	1	22	2
Rayo Vallecano	2024–25	La Liga	6	0	1	0	—		—		—		7	0
León	2024–25	Liga MX	17	2	—		—		—		—		17	2
León	2025–26	Liga MX	14	3	—		—		—		3 (Note: Appearances in Leagues Cup)	0	17	3
León	Total		31	5	—		—		—		3	0	34	5
Minnesota United	2026	Major League Soccer	6	0	2	0	—		—		—		8	0
Atlético Nacional	2026	Categoría Primera A	10	0	2	1	—		—		—		12	1
Career total			426	111	42	11	10	1	76	11	15	2	568	137

=== International ===
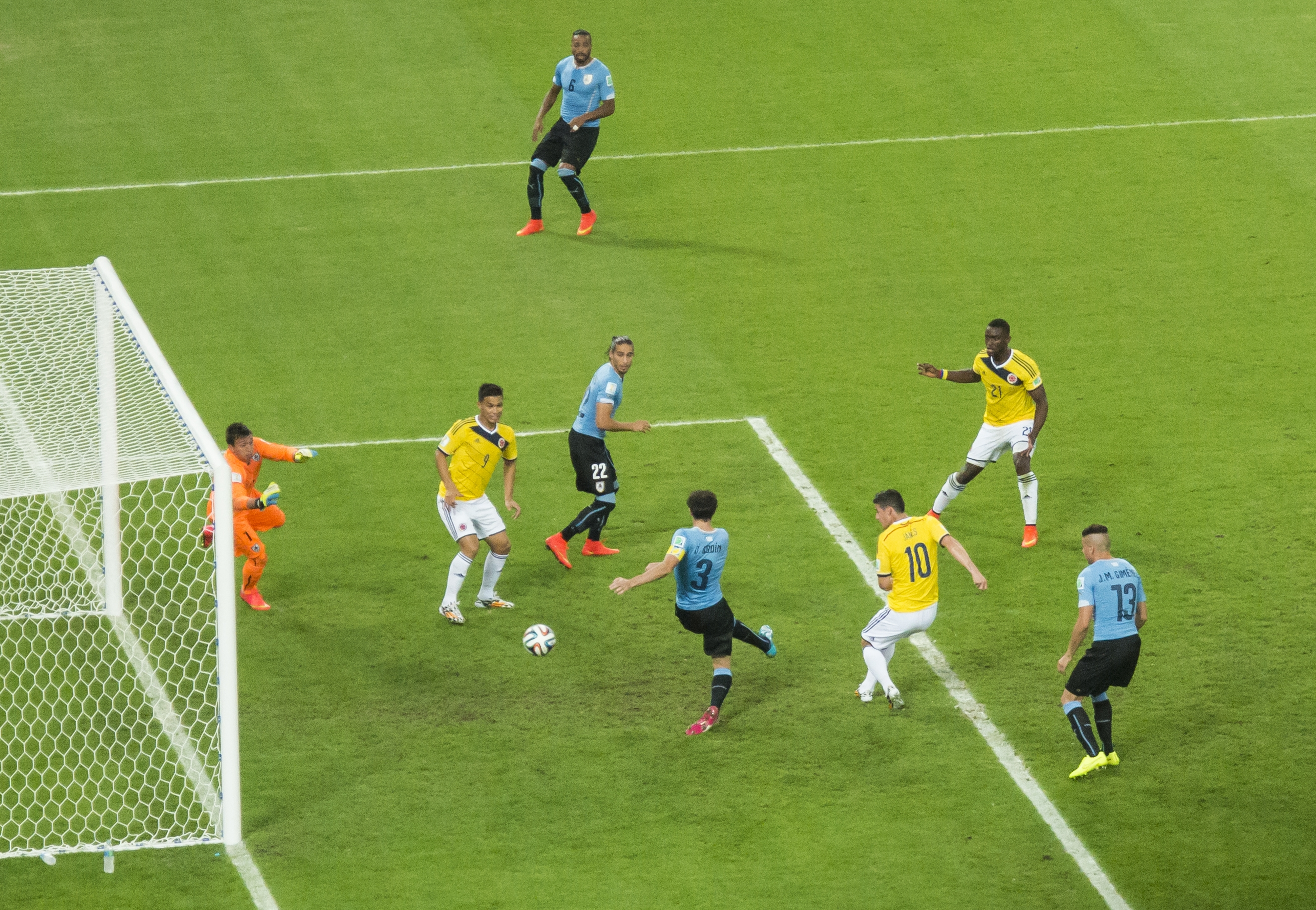
James scoring his second goal against Uruguay at the 2014 World Cup

Appearances and goals by national team and year
National team	Year	Apps	Goals
Colombia	2011	3	0
Colombia	2012	7	2
Colombia	2013	10	1
Colombia	2014	12	9
Colombia	2015	8	1
Colombia	2016	12	4
Colombia	2017	8	4
Colombia	2018	8	1
Colombia	2019	8	0
Colombia	2020	4	1
Colombia	2021	2	0
Colombia	2022	7	2
Colombia	2023	7	2
Colombia	2024	16	2
Colombia	2025	10	2
Colombia	2026	9	0
Total		131	31

Scores and results list Colombia's goal tally first; score column indicates score after each Rodríguez goal.

List of international goals scored by James Rodríguez
No.	Date	Venue	Opponent	Score	Result	Competition
1	3 June 2012	Estadio Nacional, Lima, Peru	Peru	1–0	1–0	2014 FIFA World Cup qualification
2	11 September 2012	Estadio Monumental David Arellano, Santiago, Chile	Chile	1–1	3–1	2014 FIFA World Cup qualification
3	6 September 2013	Estadio Metropolitano Roberto Meléndez, Barranquilla, Colombia	Ecuador	1–0	1–0	2014 FIFA World Cup qualification
4	5 March 2014	Estadi Cornellà-El Prat, Barcelona, Spain	Tunisia	1–0	1–1	Friendly
5	6 June 2014	Estadio Nuevo Gasómetro, Buenos Aires, Argentina	Jordan	1–0	3–0	Friendly
6	14 June 2014	Estádio Mineirão, Belo Horizonte, Brazil	Greece	3–0	3–0	2014 FIFA World Cup
7	19 June 2014	Estádio Nacional Mané Garrincha, Brasília, Brazil	Ivory Coast	1–0	2–1	2014 FIFA World Cup
8	24 June 2014	Arena Pantanal, Cuiabá, Brazil	Japan	4–1	4–1	2014 FIFA World Cup
9	28 June 2014	Estádio do Maracanã, Rio de Janeiro, Brazil	Uruguay	1–0	2–0	2014 FIFA World Cup
10	28 June 2014	Estádio do Maracanã, Rio de Janeiro, Brazil	Uruguay	2–0	2–0	2014 FIFA World Cup
11	4 July 2014	Estádio Castelão, Fortaleza, Brazil	Brazil	1–2	1–2	2014 FIFA World Cup
12	14 October 2014	Red Bull Arena, Harrison, United States	Canada	1–0	1–0	Friendly
13	12 November 2015	Estadio Nacional Julio Martínez Prádanos, Santiago, Chile	Chile	1–1	1–1	2018 FIFA World Cup qualification
14	24 March 2016	Estadio Hernando Siles, La Paz, Bolivia	Bolivia	1–0	3–2	2018 FIFA World Cup qualification
15	3 June 2016	Levi's Stadium, Santa Clara, United States	United States	2–0	2–0	Copa América Centenario
16	7 June 2016	Rose Bowl, Pasadena, United States	Paraguay	2–0	2–1	Copa América Centenario
17	1 September 2016	Estadio Metropolitano Roberto Meléndez, Barranquilla, Colombia	Venezuela	1–0	2–0	2018 FIFA World Cup qualification
18	23 March 2017	Estadio Metropolitano Roberto Meléndez, Barranquilla, Colombia	Bolivia	1–0	1–0	2018 FIFA World Cup qualification
19	28 March 2017	Estadio Olímpico Atahualpa, Quito, Ecuador	Ecuador	1–0	2–0	2018 FIFA World Cup qualification
20	13 June 2017	Coliseum Alfonso Pérez, Getafe, Spain	Cameroon	1–0	4–0	Friendly
21	10 October 2017	Estadio Nacional, Lima, Peru	Peru	1–0	1–1	2018 FIFA World Cup qualification
22	11 October 2018	Raymond James Stadium, Tampa, United States	United States	1–0	4–2	Friendly
23	17 November 2020	Estadio Rodrigo Paz Delgado, Quito, Ecuador	Ecuador	1–4	1–6	2022 FIFA World Cup qualification
24	29 March 2022	Polideportivo Cachamay, Ciudad Guayana, Venezuela	Venezuela	1–0	1–0	2022 FIFA World Cup qualification
25	24 September 2022	Red Bull Arena, Harrison, United States	Guatemala	1–0	4–1	Friendly
26	24 March 2023	Ulsan Munsu Football Stadium, Ulsan, South Korea	South Korea	1–2	2–2	Friendly
27	12 October 2023	Estadio Metropolitano Roberto Meléndez, Barranquilla, Colombia	Uruguay	1–0	2–2	2026 FIFA World Cup qualification
28	6 July 2024	State Farm Stadium, Glendale, United States	Panama	2–0	5–0	2024 Copa América
29	10 September 2024	Estadio Metropolitano Roberto Meléndez, Barranquilla, Colombia	Argentina	2–1	2–1	2026 FIFA World Cup qualification
30	4 September 2025	Estadio Metropolitano Roberto Meléndez, Barranquilla, Colombia	Bolivia	1–0	3–0	2026 FIFA World Cup qualification
31	18 November 2025	Citi Field, New York City, United States	Australia	1–0	3–0	Friendly

== Honours ==
Envigado

- Categoría Primera B: 2007

Banfield

- Argentine Primera División: Apertura 2009

Porto

- Primeira Liga: 2010–11, 2011–12, 2012–13
- Taça de Portugal: 2010–11
- Supertaça Cândido de Oliveira: 2012
- UEFA Europa League: 2010–11

Real Madrid

- La Liga: 2016–17, 2019–20
- Supercopa de España: 2020
- UEFA Champions League: 2015–16, 2016–17
- UEFA Super Cup: 2014, 2016
- FIFA Club World Cup: 2014, 2016

Bayern Munich

- Bundesliga: 2017–18, 2018–19
- DFB-Pokal: 2018–19

São Paulo

- Copa do Brasil: 2023

Colombia U20

- Toulon Tournament: 2011

Colombia

- Copa América runner-up: 2024; third place: 2016

Individual

- FIFA U-20 World Cup top assist provider: 2011
- Toulon Tournament Best Player: 2011
- LPFP Primeira Liga Breakthrough Player of the Year: 2011–12
- SJPF Player of the Month: August 2012, September 2012
- Record Team of the Year: 2012
- O Jogo Team of the Year: 2012, 2013
- Portuguese Golden Ball: 2012
- Ligue 1 top assist provider: 2013–14
- UNFP Ligue 1 Team of the Year: 2013–14
- Monaco Player of the Year: 2013–14
- Globe Revelation Player: 2014
- FIFA World Cup Golden Boot: 2014
- FIFA World Cup All-Star Team: 2014
- FIFA World Cup Dream Team: 2014
- FIFA World Cup Goal of the Tournament: 2014
- Bloomberg Sports Best Player of the World Cup: 2014
- ESPN FC Player of the World Cup: 2014
- FIFA Puskás Award: 2014
- Premios Univision Deportes Breakthrough of the Year: 2014
- Premios Univision Deportes Goal of the Year: 2014
- La Liga Team of the Season: 2014–15
- La Liga Best Midfielder: 2014–15
- UEFA Team of the Year: 2015
- Facebook FA La Liga Best Goal: 2016
- New species of coral named after him, Paragorgia jamesi
- Copa del Rey top assist provider: 2016–17
- UEFA Champions League Squad of the Season: 2017–18
- Bundesliga Team of the Season: 2017–18
- WhoScored.com Top Rated Player in Bundesliga (performance data by Opta): 2017–18
- FIFA World Cup top assist provider: 2018 (shared)
- Copa América Team of the Tournament: 2019, 2024
- Copa América top assist provider: 2024
- Copa América Golden Ball: 2024
- IFFHS Top 11 Copa América: 2024
- IFFHS Men's CONMEBOL Team: 2024

== Records ==
Throughout his career, Rodríguez has achieved several statistical milestones for both club and country. These are the main records:

- Youngest foreign player to debut in the Argentine Primera División: aged 17 years and 210 days (7 February 2009)
- Youngest foreign player to score a goal in the Argentine Primera División: aged 17 years and 230 days vs Rosario Central (27 February 2009)
- Youngest foreign player to win an Argentine Primera División title: aged 18 years and 154 days (Apertura 2009)
- Youngest foreign player to score a hat-trick in a Taça de Portugal final: aged 19 years and 314 days vs Vitória de Guimarães (2011)
- Only player to win the FIFA Puskás Award with a goal scored during a FIFA World Cup tournament: 2014 (round of 16 vs Uruguay)
- Fastest La Liga hat-trick of assists in the 21st century for a Real Madrid player: 12 minutes vs Rayo Vallecano (20 December 2015)
- Highest offensive productivity (non-penalty goals and open play assists) among midfielders in Europe's top five leagues between 2009 and 2019: 0.70 per 90 minutes
- Highest volume of accurate passes in the final third among midfielders in Europe's top five leagues between 2009 and 2019: 53 per 90 minutes
- Highest goal and assist ratio per match among midfielders in the history of Real Madrid: 0.63 per 90 minutes
- Only player in FIFA World Cup history to win the Golden Boot in one edition (2014) and subsequently finish a separate edition as the top assister (2018)
- Best goals-per-game ratio in a single World Cup edition by a midfielder: 1.2 (2014)
- Most Man of the Match awards won in a single Copa América tournament: 4 (2024; shared with Lionel Messi in 2021)
- Most assists provided in a single edition of the Copa América: 6 (2024)
- Most set-piece assists in a single edition of the Copa América: 4 (all from corner kicks, 2024)
- Second-most assists of the 21st century in the Copa América: 8 (behind Lionel Messi, 18)
- Second-most assists in the history of CONMEBOL World Cup qualifiers: 15 (behind Neymar, 19)
- Most key passes completed in a single edition of CONMEBOL World Cup qualifiers: 56 (2026)

== See also ==
- List of men's footballers with 100 or more international caps
- List of FIFA World Cup top goalscorers
