= Edgar Ramos =

Edgar Ramos may refer to:

- Edgar Ramos (baseball) (born 1975), former pitcher in Major League Baseball
- Edgar Ramos (footballer) (born 1979), Colombian footballer
