= Béatrix Dussane =

French actress (1888–1969)

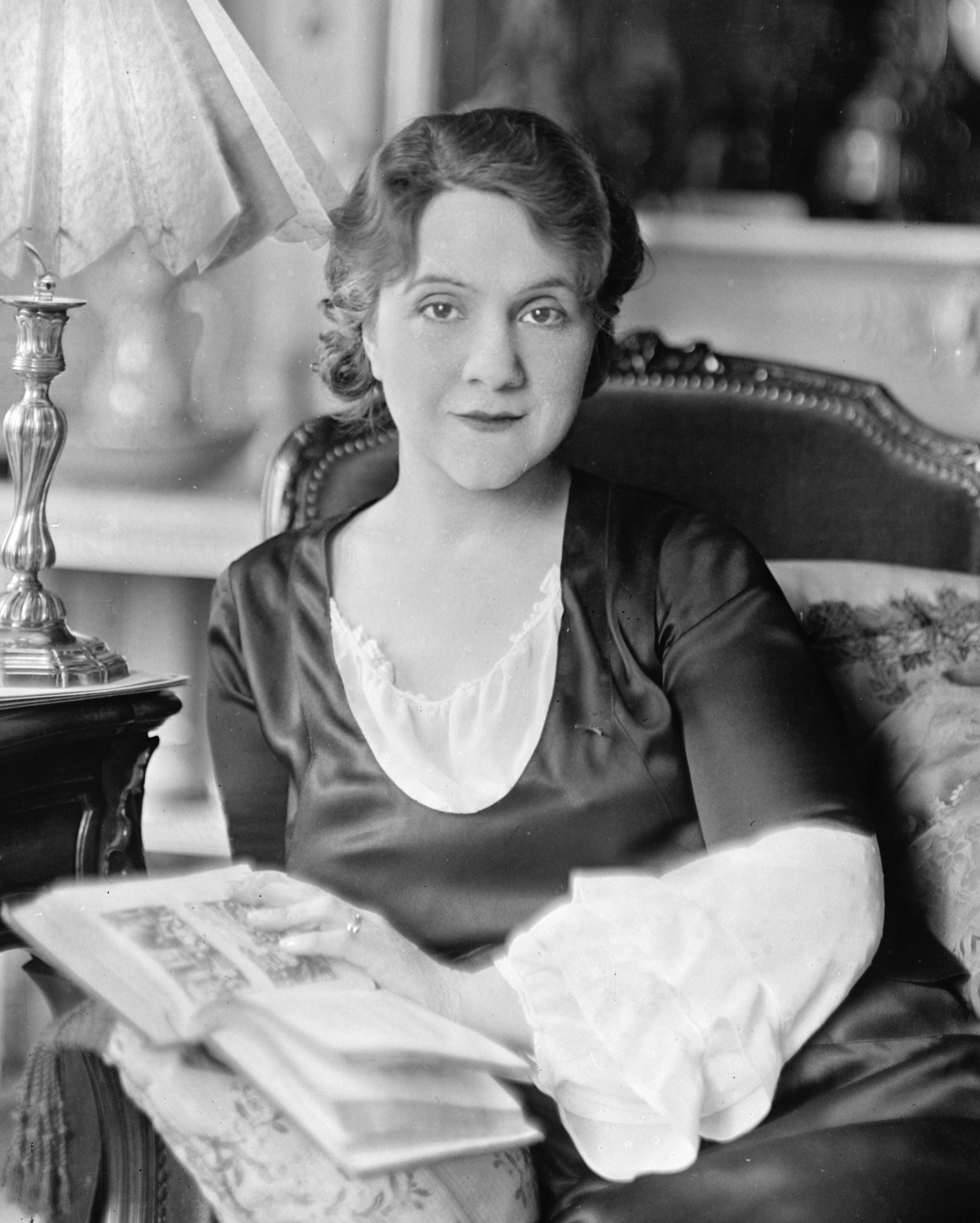
- Formal portrait of Dussane
- Born: Béatrice Dussan; 9 March 1888; Paris, France
- Died: 3 March 1969 (aged 80); Paris, France
- Occupation: Actress
- Spouse: Lucien Coulond

Béatrice Dussan, called Béatrix Dussane, (9 March 1888 – 3 March 1969) was a French stage actress. Admitted at the Comédie-Française in 1903, she became the 363th sociétaire in 1922. A street in the 15th arrondissement of Paris is named after her.

== Biography ==
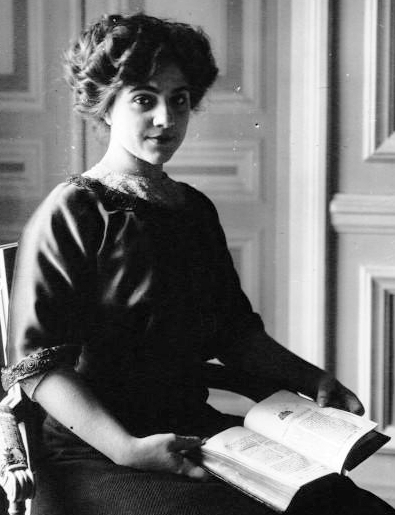
Béatrix Dussane in 1910

Née Dussan, she added an "e" to her last name to mimic the great actress of the time Rejane (pseudonym of Gabrielle Réju). A first prize of classic comedy crowned her efforts 22 July 1903. She was immediately engaged as a boarder by Jules Claretie, the then director of the Comédie-Française. On 23 September, she made her debut in The Imaginary Invalid (role of Toinette). Named an associate in 1922, she sat on the board from 1935 to 1942.

A teacher at the Conservatoire d'Art dramatique de Paris, Sophie Desmarets, Robert Hirsch, Michel Bouquet, Maria Casarès, Serge Reggiani, Daniel Gélin, Gérard Oury, Michel Le Royer, Alice Sapritch, Gilles Claude Thierrault and many others were her students.

In the 1920s, she lectured, collaborated in different magazines (including La Revue française, La Revue universelle, Le Journal de la femme, La Revue hebdomadaire, Le Journal, etc.) and published several books on theatre. From 1951, she had a column in Le Mercure de France.

Towards the end of her career, she produced radio and television programs devoted to the history of theater: Au jour et aux lumières, Des chandelles aux projecteurs, Tréteaux, racontez moi, etc.

She was very a close friend of the poet Tristan Derème until his death in 1941. Dussane was married to Lucien Coulond, a playwright and journalist at Gil Blas, Comœdia and LeJournal.

She is buried at Père Lachaise cemetery (95th division).

== Theatre ==
=== Comédie-Française ===
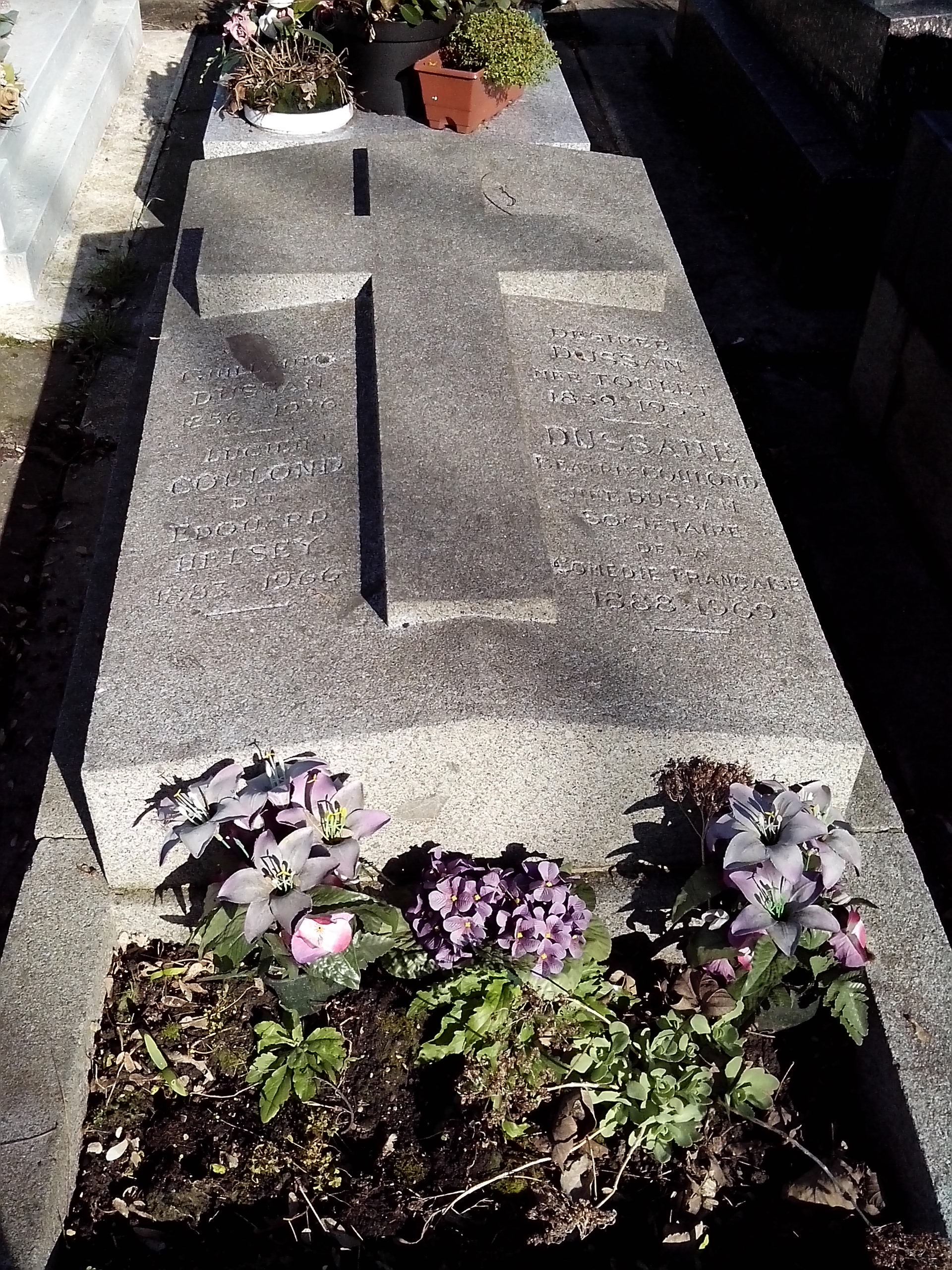
Béatrix Dussane's grave at Père Lachaise Cemetery.

- Admission at the Comédie-Française in 1903
- Sociétaire from 1922 to 1941
- 363th sociétaire
- Honorary sociétaire in 1942
- 1903: Les Précieuses ridicules by Molière as Toinette
- 1905: Don Quixote by Jean Richepin after Miguel de Cervantes
- 1906: La Courtisane by André Arnyvelde
- 1906: Les Mouettes by Paul Adam
- 1907: L'Étincelle by Édouard Pailleron
- 1907: L'amour veille by Robert de Flers and Gaston Arman de Caillavet
- 1908: Le Bon Roi Dagobert by André Rivoire
- 1909: La Robe rouge by Eugène Brieux
- 1912: Sapho by Alphonse Daudet and Adolphe Belot
- 1912: Poil de carotte by Jules Renard
- 1914: Le Prince charmant by Tristan Bernard
- 1920: Romeo and Juliet by William Shakespeare
- 1921: The School for Husbands by Molière
- 1921: La Coupe enchantée by Jean de La Fontaine and Champmeslé
- 1921: Monsieur de Pourceaugnac by Molière
- 1922: La Comtesse d'Escarbagnas by Molière
- 1922: Vautrin by Edmond Guiraud after Honoré de Balzac
- 1923: Jean de La Fontaine ou Le Distrait volontaire by Louis Geandreau and Léon Guillot de Saix
- 1924: Je suis trop grand pour moi by Jean Sarment
- 1928: Le Quatrième by Martial Piéchaud
- 1933: Monsieur Vernet by Jules Renard, directed by Charles Granval
- 1935: Madame Quinze by Jean Sarment, directed by the author
- 1936: Le Voyage à Biarritz by Jean Sarment, directed by the author
- 1937: Business is business by Octave Mirbeau, directed by Fernand Ledoux

=== Hors Comédie-Française ===
- 1947 : Richard II by William Shakespeare, directed by Jean Vilar, 1st festival d'Avignon
- 1947 : L'Histoire de Tobie et de Sara by Paul Claudel, directed by Maurice Cazeneuve, 1st festival d'Avignon
- 1951 : Jedermann by Hugo von Hofmannsthal, directed by Charles Gantillon, parvise of the Saint-Jean cathedral of Lyon

== Cinema ==
- 1968 : Franciscain of Bourges by Claude Autant-Lara : The elegant lady

== Bibliography ==
- La Comédie-Française, Paris, La Renaissance du livre, 1921 (rééd. Hachette, 1960)
- Le Comédien sans paradoxe, Paris, Plon, 1933
- Un comédien nommé Molière, Paris, Plon, 1936 (rééd. Plon, 1956)
- Sophie Arnould, la plus spirituelle des bacchantes, Paris, Albin Michel, 1938
- Mes quatre Comédies-Françaises, de Claretie à Bourdet, Paris, Le Divan, 1939
- Du nouveau sur Racine, Paris, Le Divan, 1941
- Les Vers que je dis, pourquoi ne les diriez-vous pas ?, Paris, Le Divan, 1943
- Reines de théâtre (1633-1941), Lyon, H. Lardanchet, 1944
- Notes de théâtre (1940-1950), Lyon, H. Lardanchet, 1951
- Maria Casarès, Paris, Calmann-Lévy, 1953
- Au jour et aux lumières. 1 - Premiers pas dans le temple, Paris, Calmann-Lévy, 1955
- Au jour et aux lumières. 2 - Par les fenêtres, Paris, Calmann-Lévy, 1958
- Le Théâtre, Paris, Hachette, 1958
- Cas de conscience du comédien, Paris, Fleurus, 1960
- J'étais dans la salle, Paris, Mercure de France, 1963 - Recueil de chroniques publiées entre 1951 et 1962
- Dieux des planches, Paris, Flammarion, 1964
