= Martial Piéchaud =

French writer, literary critic, and playwright

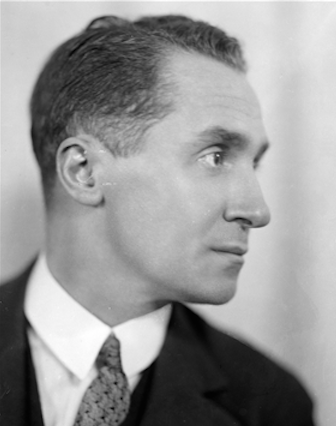

Martial Piéchaud (6 September 1888 in Bordeaux – 24 August 1957 in Nay), was a 20th-century French writer, literary critic and playwright.

He was a member of the "Lost Generation", and childhood friend of François Mauriac, André Lafon and Jean de La Ville de Mirmont. He won the Narcisse Michaud prize of the Académie française in 1951.

== Biography ==
Martial Piéchaud was from an old family of Bordeaux bourgeoisie. His father, Timothée Piéchaud, was a professor at the Faculty of Medicine of Bordeaux and eminent surgeon. His mother, Marie Cardez, was the daughter of Roman count Ferdinand Cardez, and descended from an old family of Bordeaux wine merchants, his family owning the Jourdan, Carsin, Villandraut and Deylet vineyards (Rions).

He attended the Lycée Saint-Joseph-de-Tivoli in Bordeaux before he was graduated in law in Paris. He wrote his first novel, Le Retour dans la nuit, first published in La Revue hebdomadaire, then by Éditions Grasset in 1914. This first novel assured him fame. The war interrupted his career as a novelist. He came out having lost his dear friends, André Lafon and Jean de La Ville de Mirmont, and was awarded the Croix de Guerre. He held a literary critic column in numerous newspapers, namely la Revue de Paris, L'Illustration, the Revue des deux Mondes or La Revue hebdomadaire.

As a playwright he authored Le Sommeil des amants given at the Théâtre Antoine, Le Quatrième, presented at the Comédie-Française and Mademoiselle Pascal at the Théâtre de l'Odéon. The artists Dominique and Bertrand Piéchaud were his nephews. His brother, Louis Piéchaud, was also a close friend to François Mauriac, who mentioned him several times in his Nouvelles Lettres d'une vie 1906-1970, as well as Martial. He was made an officer of the Légion d'honneur and died 24 August 1957 in Nay.

== Works ==
=== Novels ===
- 1914: Le Retour dans la nuit, Éditions Grasset.
- 1921: La Dernière auberge, Grasset & Fasquelle.
- 1925: Vallée heureuse, Plon.
- 1928: Renaître, Plon.
- 1934: Charline, Plon.
- 1935: La Romance à l'étoile, Plon.

=== Short stories ===
- 1927: La Filleule de l'Impératrice.

=== Theatre ===
- 1922: Mademoiselle Pascal, presented at the Théâtre de l'Odéon.
- 1923: Le Sommeil des Amants, presented at the Théâtre Antoine.
- 1928: Le Quatrième, presented at the Comédie-Française.
- 1932: Le Favori, presented at the Odéon and published in La Petite Illustration.

== Works for radio ==
- Le Survivant.
- L'Escalier de Barbe-Bleue.
- La Remplaçante.

== Biographies ==
- 1951: Ainsi vécut Chateaubriand, Paris, Hachette (Narcisse Michaut prize of the Académie française)
- 1954: La Vie privée de Rachel, Paris, Hachette.

== Articles ==
- 1924: Les Revues des Folies-Bergère et du Casino de Paris, Paris, published in La Revue hebdomadaire.
- 1925: Les Représentations classiques de la Comédie-Française, in La Revue hebdomadaire.
- 1925: Sainte Jeanne, de Bernard Shaw, au Théâtre des arts, in La Revue hebdomadaire.
- 1928: Nos Marionnettes de Croisset, in La Revue hebdomadaire.
- 1943: Catiche, in the Revue des deux Mondes.
- 1948: De Huysmans et de M. Folantin, in L'Illustration.
- 1948: Delacroix à Pierrefonds, in the Revue des deux Mondes.
- 1948: Huit siècles de vie britannique à Paris, in the Revue des deux Mondes.
- 1948: Marionnettes, Muses et Femmes, in the Revue des deux Mondes.
- 1948: De l'Orangerie à Carnavalet, in the Revue des deux Mondes'.
- 1948: Chevaux et Cavaliers, in the Revue des deux Mondes.
- 1949: A Versailles, in the Revue des deux Mondes.

=== Lectures ===
- 1951: Notre-Dame de la Sauve, Saint-Joseph de Tivoli, Bordeaux, lecture given by Martial Piéchaud 29 April 1951.

== Bibliography ==
- J. et B. Guérin, Des hommes et des activités autour d'un demi-siècle
- Temerson, Biographie des principales personnalités, 1956 – 1963
