= Bernard Barbey =

Swiss diplomat and writer

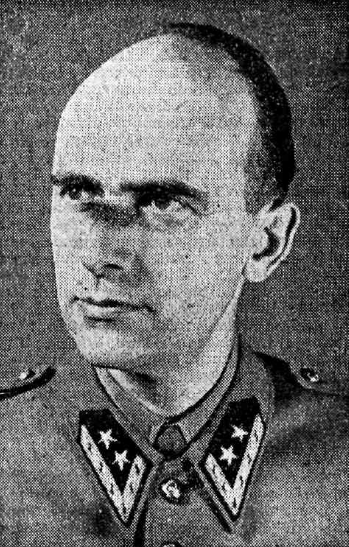
- Bernard Barbey in military uniform.
- Born: July 2, 1900; Montcherand, Switzerland
- Died: January 25, 1970 (aged 69); Boulogne-Billancourt, France
- Occupations: Diplomat, writer, military officer

Bernard Barbey (2 July 1900 – 25 January 1970) was a Swiss diplomat, writer, and military officer from Vaud. He was known for his literary works and his service during World War II as a close aide to Henri Guisan, the Swiss army general.

== Biography ==
Born in Montcherand, Barbey studied in Geneva and Lausanne before moving to Paris to pursue a literary career. He collaborated with La Revue hebdomadaire and befriended notable writers such as Jean Cocteau and François Mauriac. His first novel, Le Cœur gros (1924), gained critical acclaim and led to further works including La Maladère (1926) and Ambassadeur de France (1934).

During World War II, Barbey served as a lieutenant colonel in the Swiss army and became chief of staff to General Henri Guisan. He documented this period in his memoir P.C. du Général (1947). Barbey also played a key role in aiding the French Resistance.

Following the war, he served as a cultural attaché at the Swiss Legation in Paris, the Hôtel de Besenval, and represented Switzerland at UNESCO. His final novel, Chevaux abandonnés sur le champ de bataille, won the Grand Prix du roman de l'Académie française in 1951.

He died in a car accident in Boulogne-Billancourt in 1970.

== Selected works ==
- Le Cœur gros (1924)
- La Maladère (1926)
- Toute à tous (1930)
- La Maison d'illusion (1933)
- Ambassadeur de France (1934)
- Le Crépuscule du matin (1938)
- P.C. du Général (1947)
- Chevaux abandonnés sur le champ de bataille (1951)
- Aller et Retour (1967)

== Literature ==
- Francillon, Roger (2015). Histoire de la littérature en Suisse romande (Nouvelle édition ed.). Carouge-Genève: Zoe. ISBN 978-2-88182-943-7.
- Gautschi, Willi (1994). General Henri Guisan: die schweizerische Armeeführung im Zweiten Weltkrieg (4., durchges. Aufl ed.). Zürich: Verl. Neue Zürcher Zeitung. ISBN 978-3-85823-516-9.
