= Portuguese Golden Ball =

- Native name: A Bola de Ouro
- Description: Annual award given to the best player of the year in the Primeira Liga
- Country: Portugal
- Presented by: A Bola
- Website: http://www.abola.pt

The Portuguese Golden Ball (known in Portuguese as A Bola de Ouro) is an annual award given, by Portuguese newspaper A Bola, to the player who is adjudged to have been the best of the year in the Primeira Liga. The first winner of the award was Eusébio, in 1991. Initially, it was a career award, but since then, the award was given to the best player in the league.

== Format ==
The prize is given out by Portuguese newspaper A Bola to the best player in the Portuguese Liga.

== Winners ==
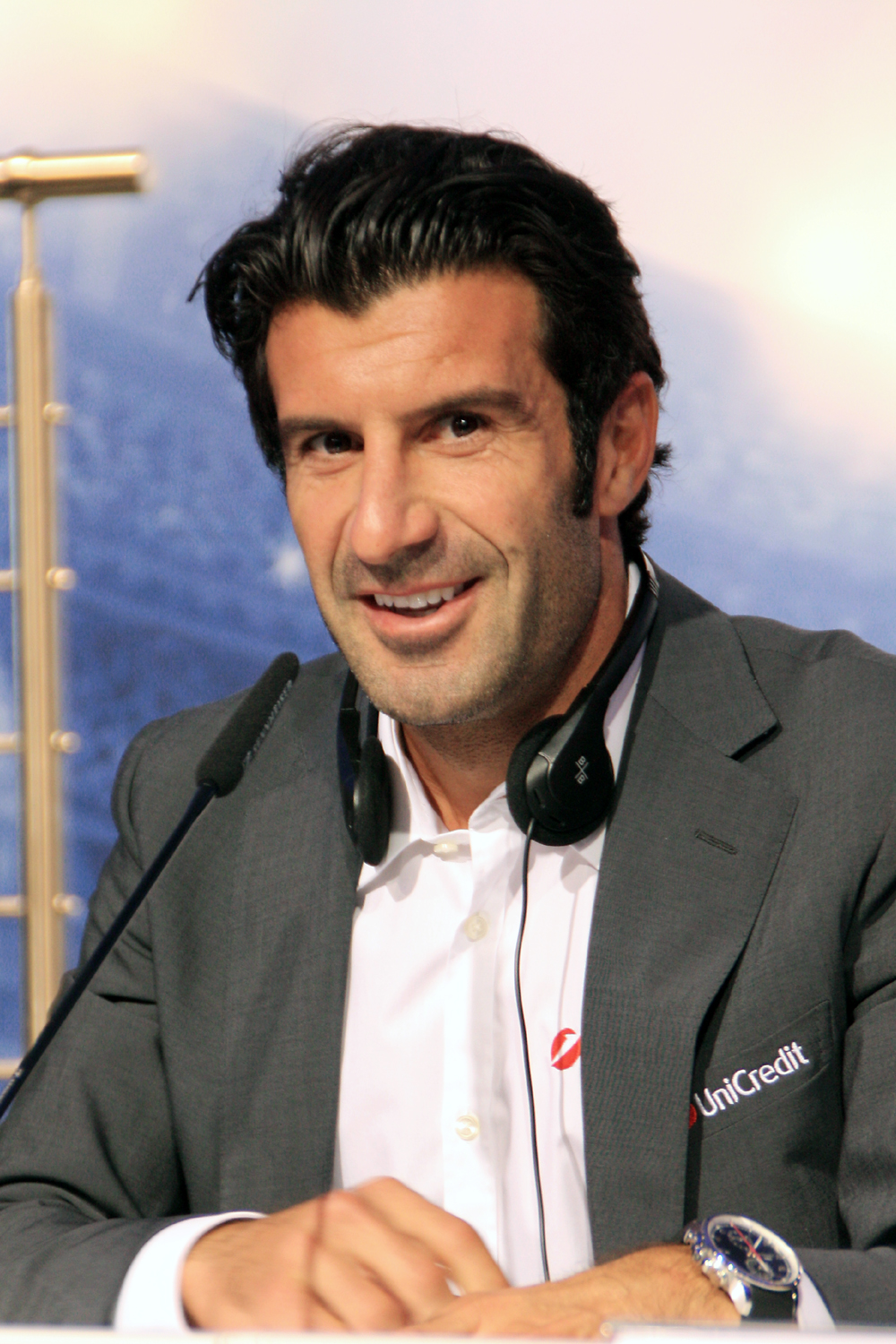
Luís Figo won the award in 1994.

The award has been presented on 20 occasions as of 2012, with 17 different winners.

Year	Winner	Country	Club	Position	Sources	Notes
1991	Eusébio	Portugal	Retired	Forward		^{[A]}
1992	Vítor Baía	Portugal	Porto	Goalkeeper		
1993	João Pinto	Portugal	Benfica	Forward		
1994	Luís Figo	Portugal	Sporting CP	Midfielder		
1995	Domingos	Portugal	Porto	Forward		
1996	João Pinto	Portugal	Benfica	Forward		
1997	Mário Jardel	Brazil	Porto	Forward		
1998	Mário Jardel	Brazil	Porto	Forward		
1999	-	-	-	-		^{[B]}
2000	Jorge Costa	Portugal	Porto	Defender		
2001	Erwin Sánchez	Bolivia	Boavista	Midfielder		
2002	Mário Jardel	Brazil	Sporting CP	Forward		
2003	Deco	Brazil	Porto	Midfielder		
2004	Adriano Rossato	Brazil	Nacional	Defender		
2005	Simão	Portugal	Benfica	Midfielder		
2006	Petit	Portugal	Benfica	Midfielder		
2007	Ricardo Quaresma	Portugal	Porto	Midfielder		
2008	-	-	-	-		
2009	Lucho González	Argentina	Porto	Midfielder		
2010	Javier Saviola	Argentina	Benfica	Forward		
2011	Radamel Falcao	Colombia	Porto	Forward		
2012	James Rodríguez	Colombia	Porto	Midfielder		

== See also ==
- CNID Footballer of the Year
- SJPF Player of the Month
- LPFP Primeira Liga Player of the Year

== Notes ==
A. It was a career award.
B. In 1999 the Portuguese Golden Ball was not awarded.
