= Javier Dussan =

Colombian footballer (born 1980)

Javier Dussán
Personal information
- Full name: Javier Dussán Prada
- Date of birth: 13 May 1980 (age 46)
- Place of birth: Flandes, Tolima, Colombia
- Height: 1.90 m (6 ft 3 in)
- Position: Goalkeeper

Senior career*
Years	Team	Apps	(Gls)
1997–1998	Girardot	0	(0)
1999–2000	Cartagena	0	(0)
2001–2006	América de Cali	0	(0)
2006–2007	Depor	17	(0)
2008	Academia	12	(0)
2008–2009	Melipilla	12	(0)
2010–2011	Tauro	8	(0)
2012	Depor	24	(0)
- * Club domestic league appearances and goals as of 1 August 2021

Javier Dussán Prada (born 13 May 1980) is a Colombian footballer currently playing for Depor FC of the Primera Division B in Colombia. He plays as a goalkeeper.

He has been remembered in Chile for his spell at Deportes Melipilla.

== Career ==
Dussán has played for several football clubs in Colombia, including Girardot FC, Real Cartagena, América de Cali, Depor FC and Academia FC. He helped Real Cartagena achieve promotion to Categoría Primera A in 1999.

In 2008, Dussán moved to Chile, joining Deportes Melipilla. He left Melipilla to join Panamanian side Tauro FC in January 2010. In 2012 the returns to Depor FC, a professor at the soccer school in Cali (Colombia) Azteca Diablo.
