= CNID Footballer of the Year =

Annual football award

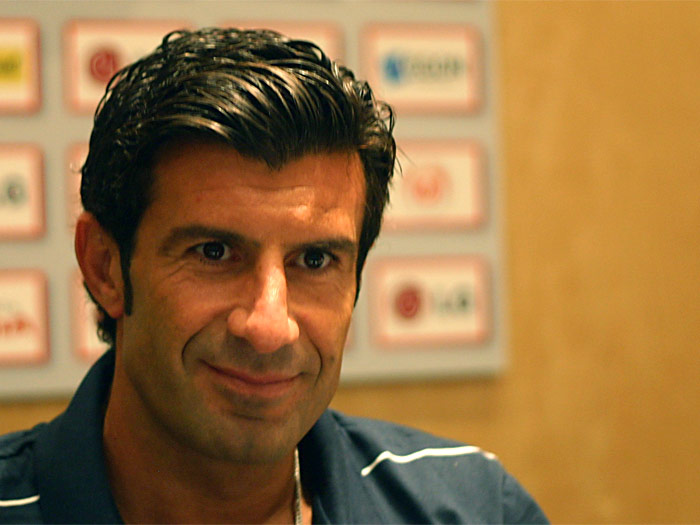
Luís Figo won the award six times.

The CNID Footballer of the Year (often called the Portuguese Footballer of the Year) was an annual award given to the player who was adjudged to have been the best of the year in Primeira Liga. Between 1970 and 2005, this award was given to a Portuguese footballer playing in a foreign country or any player in Portuguese first League. Since 2006, this award only distinguished the best footballers to play in the Portuguese first League, so was called Primeira Liga Footballer of the Year, and the winner is chosen by a vote amongst the members of the Sports National Press Club (CNID).

The CNID Footballer of the Year award (from 1970 to 2005) has been presented since 1970, when the inaugural winner was Benfica striker Eusébio and the award was conceded by Portuguese newspaper Diário Popular. The last winner of the award was Ricardo Quaresma, in 2005. Seven players won the award on more than one occasion. Figo has won the award on the most occasions, having won six times in a row.

The first CNID Footballer of the Year or Primeira Liga Footballer of the Year award (2006 to present) was won by Quaresma in 2006, and the most recent winner is Benfica midfielder Pizzi. Benfica striker Jonas and former Porto winger Hulk are the only players who have won the award more than once.

== CNID Footballer of the Year (1970–2005) ==
The "CNID Footballer of the Year" or "Portuguese Footballer of the Year" (from 1970 to 2005) was an annual award given to a Portuguese player in foreign countries or any player in Primeira Liga, who is adjudged to have been the best player of the season. Only one foreign player has been awarded it, with Mário Jardel winning in 2002, although they were frequently nominated in the years previous.) The first award was delivered by the Portuguese newspaper Diário Popular to Benfica forward Eusébio in 1970. Luís Figo has won the trophy on the most occasions with six, all consecutively. The award has been presented on 36 occasions as of 2005 with 23 different winners.

=== Winners ===
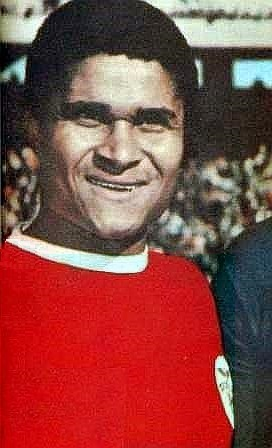
Eusébio was the first winner, in 1970.

Year	Winner	Playing League	Club	Position	Source	Notes
1970	Eusébio	(Portugal) Primeira Liga	Benfica	Forward		^{[A]}
1971	Nené	(Portugal) Primeira Liga	Benfica	Forward		
1972	Toni	(Portugal) Primeira Liga	Benfica	Midfielder		
1973	Eusébio	(Portugal) Primeira Liga	Benfica	Forward		^{[B]}
1974	Humberto Coelho	(Portugal) Primeira Liga	Benfica	Defender		
1975	João Alves	(Portugal) Primeira Liga	Boavista	Midfielder		
1976	Fernando Chalana	(Portugal) Primeira Liga	Benfica	Midfielder		
1977	Manuel Bento	(Portugal) Primeira Liga	Benfica	Goalkeeper		
1978	António Oliveira	(Portugal) Primeira Liga	Porto	Midfielder		
1979	José Costa	(Portugal) Primeira Liga	Porto	Midfielder		
1980	Rui Jordão	(Portugal) Primeira Liga	Sporting CP	Forward		
1981	António Oliveira	(Portugal) Primeira Liga	Penafiel/Sporting CP	Midfielder		
1982	António Oliveira	(Portugal) Primeira Liga	Sporting CP	Midfielder		^{[C]}
1983	Fernando Gomes	(Portugal) Primeira Liga	Porto	Forward		
1984	Fernando Chalana	(Portugal) Primeira Liga	Benfica	Midfielder		
1985	Carlos Manuel	(Portugal) Primeira Liga	Benfica	Midfielder		
1986	Paulo Futre	(Portugal) Primeira Liga	Porto	Midfielder		
1987	Paulo Futre	(Portugal) Primeira Liga/ (Spain) La Liga	Porto/Atlético Madrid	Midfielder		
1988	Rui Barros	(Portugal) Primeira Liga/ (Italy) Serie A	Porto/Juventus	Midfielder		
1989	Vítor Baía	(Portugal) Primeira Liga	Porto	Goalkeeper		
1990	Domingos	(Portugal) Primeira Liga	Porto	Forward		
1991	Vítor Baía	(Portugal) Primeira Liga	Porto	Goalkeeper		
1992	João Pinto	(Portugal) Primeira Liga	Benfica	Forward		
1993	João Pinto	(Portugal) Primeira Liga	Benfica	Forward		
1994	João Pinto	(Portugal) Primeira Liga	Benfica	Forward		
1995	Luís Figo	(Portugal) Primeira Liga/ (Spain) La Liga	Sporting CP/Barcelona	Midfielder		
1996	Luís Figo	(Spain) La Liga	Barcelona	Midfielder		^{[D]}
1997	Luís Figo	(Spain) La Liga	Barcelona	Midfielder		
1998	Luís Figo	(Spain) La Liga	Barcelona	Midfielder		^{[E]}
1999	Luís Figo	(Spain) La Liga	Barcelona	Midfielder		^{[F]}
2000	Luís Figo	(Spain) La Liga	Barcelona/Real Madrid	Midfielder		^{[G]}
2001	Petit	(Portugal) Primeira Liga	Boavista	Midfielder		
2002	Mário Jardel	(Portugal) Primeira Liga	Sporting CP	Forward		
2003	Ricardo Carvalho	(Portugal) Primeira Liga	Porto	Defender		
2004	Deco	(Portugal) Primeira Liga	Porto	Midfielder		
2005	Ricardo Quaresma	(Portugal) Primeira Liga	Porto	Midfielder		

== CNID Best Portuguese Athlete Abroad (2006–) ==
The CNID Best Portuguese Athlete Abroad is an annual award given to Portuguese athletes performing outside of Portugal judged by CNID to have been the best. The award is given to footballers as well as to athletes in other fields.

Year	Winner*	Club	Source
2006	Deco	(Spain) Barcelona	
2007	Cristiano Ronaldo	(England) Manchester United	
2008	Cristiano Ronaldo	(England) Manchester United	
2009	Cristiano Ronaldo	(Spain) Real Madrid	
2010	Simão	(Spain) Atlético Madrid	
2011	Cristiano Ronaldo	(Spain) Real Madrid	
2012	Cristiano Ronaldo	(Spain) Real Madrid	
2013	Cristiano Ronaldo	(Spain) Real Madrid	
2014	Pepe	(Spain) Real Madrid	
2015	Cristiano Ronaldo	(Spain) Real Madrid	
2016	Cristiano Ronaldo	(Spain) Real Madrid	
2017	Cristiano Ronaldo	(Spain) Real Madrid	
2018	Cristiano Ronaldo	(Italy) Juventus	
2019	Bernardo Silva	(England) Manchester City	
2021	Bernardo Silva	(England) Manchester City	
2022	Diogo Jota	(England) Liverpool	
2023	Rafael Leão	(Italy) Milan	

*Only footballers listed

== CNID Footballer of the Year (2006–) ==
The "CNID Footballer of the Year" or "Primeira Liga Footballer of the Year" award, awarded by the Sports National Press Club (CNID), distinguishes the best footballer playing in the Primeira Liga. In 2006, during the celebration of the CNID's 40th anniversary, the award was officially presented for the first time, to Porto winger Ricardo Quaresma. Since 2011, the SCC and NOS jointly sponsor the CNID awards delivered annually. Under this new sponsorship agreement, all football awards are delivered during the Portuguese League for Professional Football (LPFP) Gala.

== See also ==
- LPFP Awards
- Portuguese Golden Ball

== Notes ==
A. First winner, and the award was delivered by Portuguese newspaper Diário Popular.
B. First player to win the award twice
C. First player to win the award three times
D. First player to win the award in a foreign country
E. First player to win the award four times
F. First player to win the award five times
G. First player to win the award six times (record)
