= Elizabeth B. Dussan V. =

American mathematician

Elizabeth B. Stein Dussan V, who was born in 1946, is an American applied mathematician, condensed matter physicist, and chemical engineer. Her research involves fluid dynamics, and she is known for her work on wetting, porous media, and fluid-fluid interfaces.

== Education and career ==
Dussan completed her undergraduate degree in applied mathematics from Stony Brook University in 1967. Furthermore, she completed her Ph.D. from Johns Hopkins University in 1972. Her dissertation, On the Motion of a Line Common to Three Different Materials, was supervised by applied mathematician Stephen H. Davis., and was a part of her work while studying for her Ph.D.

She is retired as a Scientific Advisor for the Schlumberger-Doll Research Center, as well as having taught chemical engineering at the University of Pennsylvania.

== Recognition ==
Dussan became a Guggenheim Fellow in 1984, honoring her for the work and research in "spreading of liquids on solid surfaces". Following this achievement, she then became a Fellow of the American Physical Society in 1985 "for her deep insights into the mechanisms and the realistic modeling of phenomena involving fluid-fluid interfaces, particularly in situations in which moving contact lines and mutual fluid displacement occur".

She was elected to the National Academy of Engineering in 2004 "for innovative contributions to the wetting of solids and complex flows in porous media". In 2009, she became one of the inaugural Fellows of the Society for Industrial and Applied Mathematics for her actions and contributions in wetting and flow in porous media.

In 1985, Stony Brook University awarded her their Distinguished Alumni Award as a result of her work as a Guggenheim Fellow of the American Physical Society.
