= Edgar Ramos (footballer) =

Colombian footballer (born 1979)

Personal information
- Full name: Edgar Alexander Ramos Martínez
- Date of birth: September 27, 1979 (age 47)
- Place of birth: Bogotá, Colombia
- Height: 1.75 m (5 ft 9 in)
- Positions: Defender; midfielder

Senior career*
Years	Team	Apps	(Gls)
1999–2004	Independiente Santa Fe	27+	(1)
2004	→ Deportivo Pasto (loan)	15	(0)
2005	→ Deportes Quindío (loan)	35	(3)
2006	→ Patriotas (loan)		
2006	→ Boyacá Chicó (loan)	15	(2)
2007–2008	Academia	20	(0)
2008–2009	Quilmes		
2009	Atlético Bucaramanga		
2010	Alianza		
2010	Patriotas		
2011–2012	Academia	46	(1)
2012	Bogotá	11	(3)
2013	Llaneros	18	(0)

International career
2003	Colombia	2	(0)
- * Club domestic league appearances and goals

Edgar Alexander Ramos Martínez (Note: In this Spanish name, the first or paternal surname is Ramos and the second or maternal family name is Martínez.) (born September 27, 1979), known as Edgar Ramos, is a Colombian retired footballer who last played for Llaneros.
