= Estadio Compensar =

Multi-use stadium in Bogotá, Colombia

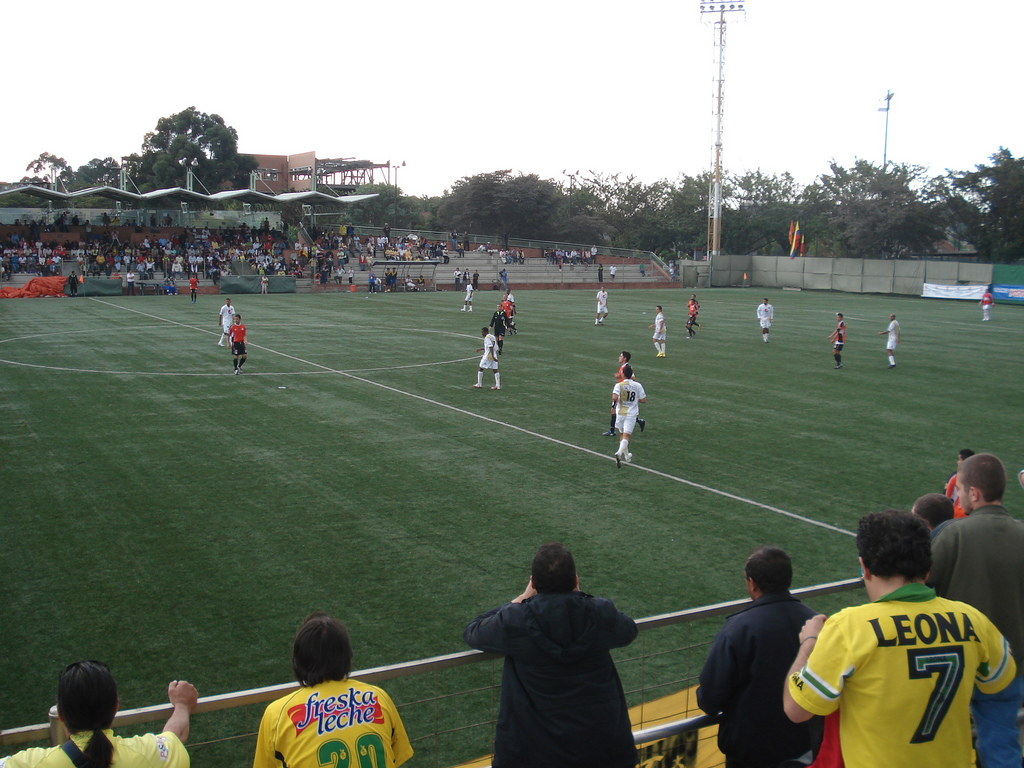
- Interactive map of Estadio Compensar
- Coordinates: 4°39′40.12″N 74°6′3.94″W
- Owner: Compensar
- Capacity: 4,500
- Surface: Synthetic grass

Construction
- Opened: 1998

Estadio Compensar is a multi-use stadium in Bogotá, Colombia. It is currently used mostly for football matches and was the home stadium of Academia FC. The stadium holds 4,500 people and opened in 1998.
