= La Revue hebdomadaire =

Literary magazine in Paris, France

- 1908 issue of La Revue hebdomadaire
- Editor: François Le Grix
- Categories: Literary magazine
- Frequency: Weekly
- Publisher: Plon
- First issue: 1892
- Final issue: 1939
- Country: France
- Based in: Paris
- Language: French
- ISSN: 0151-1882

La Revue hebdomadaire was a literary magazine founded in 1892 by Fernand Laudet and published until 1939.

== History ==
Until the beginning of 20th century, the journal was directed by Pierre Mainguet with Félix Jeantet as editor. In 1908, it absorbed the monthly magazine Le Monde moderne.

After having been its secretary in the 1910s, then its editor-in-chief in November 1920, succeeding René Moulin, François Le Grix (1881–1966) became its director, a position he kept from October 1922 until 1939. The editors were Jean d'Elbée (1882–1966) then Robert de Saint-Jean from 1928 to 1935, followed by Bernard Barbey. Le Grix called on new collaborators such as François Mauriac (who called him “La Grise” in the 1910s, because of his displayed homosexuality), responsible for the theatrical section from 1921 to 1923, Edmond Jaloux (literary life), Wladimir d'Ormesson (foreign policy), Louis Latzarus (Parisian life, then political chronicle from 1928), Gustave Fagniez and Frantz Funck-Brentano (history), Robert Vallery-Radot (religious life), Paul Reynaud (parliamentary forum). The literary magazine founded in 1929 the prize Prix du Premier Roman.

The success of the Cartel des Gauches led the journal to take a stand in political debates and gradually become radicalized. Le Grix was then an unparliamentary conservative and hostile to democracy. In 1934 and 1935, he went several times to Italy, where he met Benito Mussolini. The fascist dictator granted him financial assistance with two million francs, which enabled him to buy the daily L'Ami du peuple.
