= Academia F.C. =

Academia FC
- Full name: Corporacion Deportiva; Academia Fútbol Club
- Nicknames: Equipo Mandarina de Bogotá (Tangerine team of Bogotá), Equipo de la 68 (68 Avenue team)
- Founded: 2005
- Dissolved: 2012
- Ground: Estadio Compensar; Bogotá, Colombia
- Capacity: 4,500
- League: Categoría Primera B
- Final season 2012-I: 13°
Home colours	Away colours

Academia Fútbol Club was a Colombian professional football club based in Bogotá. The club was founded in 2005 and dissolved in 2012, becoming Llaneros.

== History ==
Academia had its best season in 2007. In the first tournament of the year was runner-up after losing the final against Envigado. In the first game tied at home 1:1, 0:0 in the second tied, and in penalty kicks lose 7:6. In the second tournament the team is once again runner to lose both games in the final 2:1 against Envigado FC anew, with goals from Carlos Sciucatti for Academia. In the return match, played at the Estadio Compensar, Ricardo Laborde scored for Academia, but the match ended 1:2. On November 28 and December 1 Academy played against Deportivo Pereira, to define the second promoted to the Primera A for 2008. In the first leg the match finished tied (1:1), in the second leg, Pereira defeated Academia 3:1.

In 2012 the team was sold to Villavicencio, due to budget cuts of Compensar. The decision to sell the team was approved on March 22. On March 27 became official the new team: Llaneros F.C.

=== Very close to promotion ===
Envigado F.C. defeated Academia 2:1 in the match that decided the Primera B title and was crowned champion. Ormedis Madera and Giovanni Moreno scored Envigado's goals, while Ricardo Laborde scored for Academia. The title secured Envigado's direct return to Colombia's first division for the 2008 season. The club had been relegated in 2006 and spent one season in Primera B.
