= 2007 South American U-17 Championship squads =

Players name marked in bold have been capped at full international level.

== Group A ==
=== Brazil ===
Head coach: (Brazil) Edgar Pereira

No.	Pos.	Player	Date of birth (age)	Caps	Club
1	GK	Marcelo Carné	6 February 1990 (aged 17)		(Brazil) Flamengo
2	DF	Rafael	9 July 1990 (aged 16)		(Brazil) Fluminense
3	DF	Michel Schmoller	10 June 1990 (aged 16)		(Brazil) Figueirense
4	DF	Átila	11 April 1990 (aged 16)		(Brazil) Corinthians
5	MF	Fellipe Bastos	1 February 1990 (aged 17)		(Brazil) Botafogo
6	DF	Fabio	9 July 1990 (aged 16)		(Brazil) Fluminense
7	MF	Bernardo	20 May 1990 (aged 16)		(Brazil) Cruzeiro
8	MF	Tales	20 January 1990 (aged 17)		(Brazil) Internacional
9	FW	Maicon	2 January 1990 (aged 17)		(Brazil) Fluminense
10	MF	Lulinha	10 April 1990 (aged 16)		(Brazil) Corinthians
11	MF	Alex Teixeira	6 January 1990 (aged 17)		(Brazil) Vasco da Gama
12	GK	Leonardo	22 September 1990 (aged 16)		(Brazil) São Paulo FC
13	DF	Lucas Galdino	28 June 1990 (aged 16)		(Brazil) Flamengo
14	DF	Rafael Forster	23 July 1990 (aged 16)		(Brazil) Internacional
15	DF	Raul	13 March 1990 (aged 16)		(Brazil) Atlético Paranaense
16	MF	Bruno Collaço	8 March 1990 (aged 16)		(Brazil) Gremio
17	MF	Tiago Dutra	17 September 1990 (aged 16)		(Brazil) Gremio
18	DF	**Giuliano**	31 May 1990 (aged 16)		(Brazil) Paraná Clube
19	FW	Choco	4 January 1990 (aged 17)		(Brazil) Atlético Paranaense
20	FW	Fabinho	17 March 1990 (aged 16)		(Brazil) EC Juventude

=== Peru ===
Head coach: (Peru) Juan José Oré

No.	Pos.	Player	Date of birth (age)	Caps	Club
1	GK	Éder Hermoza	April 4, 1990 (aged 16)		(Peru) Alianza Lima
2	DF	Jersi Sócola	July 7, 1990 (aged 16)		(Peru) Alianza Lima
3	DF	Anthony Molina	August 13, 1990 (aged 16)		(Peru) Universidad San Martín de Porres
4	DF	Joseph Muñoz	January 6, 1990 (aged 17)		(Peru) Esther Grande de Bentin
5	DF	**Néstor Duarte**	September 8, 1990 (aged 16)		(Peru) Academia Deportiva Cantolao
6	MF	Bryan Salazar	June 1, 1990 (aged 16)		(Peru) Sporting Cristal
7	MF	Reimond Manco	August 23, 1990 (aged 16)		(Peru) Alianza Lima
8	MF	Carlos Alonso Bazalar	March 19, 1990 (aged 16)		(Peru) Cienciano
9	FW	**Irven Ávila**	July 2, 1990 (aged 16)		(Peru) Deportivo Real
10	MF	Daniel Sánchez	May 2, 1990 (aged 16)		(Peru) Sporting Cristal
11	MF	**Luis Trujillo**	December 27, 1990 (aged 16)		(Peru) Alianza Lima
12	GK	**Pedro Gallese**	February 23, 1990 (aged 17)		(Peru) Universidad San Martín de Porres
13	DF	Manuel Calderón	January 20, 1990 (aged 17)		(Peru) Deportivo Curibamba
14	MF	Erick Coavoy	January 22, 1990 (aged 17)		(Peru) Deportivo Curibamba
15	DF	Jairo Hernández	March 2, 1990 (aged 17)		(Peru) Alianza Lima
16	FW	Yovic De La Cruz	July 11, 1990 (aged 16)		(Peru) Esther Grande de Bentin
17	DF	Juan Zevallos	July 7, 1990 (aged 16)		(Peru) Universitario
18	MF	César Ruiz	January 10, 1990 (aged 17)		(Peru) Sporting Cristal
19	FW	Christian La Torre	March 9, 1990 (aged 16)		(Peru) Sport Boys
20	MF	Gary Correa	May 23, 1990 (aged 16)		(Peru) Universitario

== Group B ==
=== Argentina ===
Head coach: (Argentina) Miguel Ángel Tojo

No.	Pos.	Player	Date of birth (age)	Caps	Club
1	GK	Luis Ojeda	21 March 1990 (aged 16)		(Argentina) Unión
2	DF	**Mateo Musacchio**	26 August 1990 (aged 16)		(Argentina) River Plate
3	DF	Germán Rica	29 January 1990 (aged 17)		(Argentina) San Lorenzo
4	DF	Damián Martínez	31 January 1990 (aged 17)		(Argentina) San Lorenzo
5	MF	Fernando Godoy	1 May 1990 (aged 16)		(Argentina) Independiente
6	DF	Fernando Meza	21 March 1990 (aged 16)		(Argentina) San Lorenzo
7	FW	Santiago Fernández	29 June 1990 (aged 16)		(Argentina) Newell's Old Boys
8	MF	Cristian Gaitán	15 January 1990 (aged 17)		(Argentina) Estudiantes (LP)
9	FW	Nicolás Mazzola	28 January 1990 (aged 17)		(Argentina) Independiente
10	MF	Brian Sarmiento	22 April 1990 (aged 16)		(Argentina) Estudiantes (LP)
11	MF	Juan Sánchez Miño	1 January 1990 (aged 17)		(Argentina) Boca Juniors
12	GK	Federico Nicosia	5 February 1990 (aged 17)		(Argentina) Rosario Central
13	DF	Leandro Basterrechea	9 April 1990 (aged 16)		(Argentina) Gimnasia y Esgrima (LP)
14	DF	Alexis Machuca	10 May 1990 (aged 16)		(Argentina) Newell's Old Boys
15	FW	Matías Quintana	16 February 1990 (aged 17)		(Argentina) Quilmes
16	MF	**Guido Pizarro**	26 February 1990 (aged 17)		(Argentina) Lanús
17	FW	**Eduardo Salvio**	13 July 1990 (aged 16)		(Argentina) Lanús
18	FW	Federico Laurito	18 May 1990 (aged 16)		(Italy) Udinese
19	MF	Roberto Vissio	11 March 1990 (aged 16)		(Argentina) Independiente
20	MF	Franco Zuculini	5 September 1990 (aged 16)		(Argentina) Racing Club

=== Colombia ===
Head coach: (Colombia) Eduardo Lara

No.	Pos.	Player	Date of birth (age)	Caps	Club
1	GK	Mauricio Reyes	February 22, 1990 (aged 17)		(Colombia) Santa Fe
2	DF	Ricardo Chará	May 24, 1990 (aged 16)		(Colombia) Centauros Villavicencio
3	DF	Edward Zea	January 19, 1990 (aged 17)		(Colombia) Deportes Quindío
4	MF	Jhonatan Segura	July 9, 1990 (aged 16)		(Colombia) Academia F.C.
5	DF	Cristian Javier Quiñonez	March 11, 1991 (aged 15)		(Colombia) Independiente Santa Fe
6	MF	Julián Guillermo	February 28, 1990 (aged 17)		(Colombia) Academia
7	FW	Cristian Nazarit	August 13, 1990 (aged 16)		(Colombia) América de Cali
8	FW	Jorge Mosquera	April 22, 1990 (aged 16)		(Colombia) Depor FC Jamundi
9	FW	Santiago Tréllez	January 17, 1990 (aged 17)		(Colombia) Independiente Medellín
10	MF	**James Rodríguez**	July 12, 1991 (aged 15)		(Colombia) Envigado
11	MF	Luis Miguel Payares Blanco	January 14, 1990 (aged 17)		(Colombia) Deportivo Cali
12	GK	Jaiber Cardona	January 19, 1990 (aged 17)		(Colombia) Escuela Carlos Sarmiento
13	DF	Carlos Ramos	February 11, 1990 (aged 17)		(Colombia) Envigado
14	MF	Junior Romero	February 18, 1990 (aged 17)		(Colombia) Unión Magdalena
15	MF	Ricardo Serna	January 26, 1990 (aged 17)		(Colombia) Deportivo Cali
16	MF	Miguel Ángel Julio	February 21, 1991 (aged 16)		(Colombia) Independiente Medellín
17	DF	Andrés Mosquera	February 20, 1990 (aged 17)		(Colombia) Independiente Medellín
18	MF	José Gabriel Ramírez	September 18, 1990 (aged 16)		(Colombia) Envigado
19	DF	Sebastián Viáfara	April 2, 1991 (aged 15)		(Colombia) Centauros Villavicencio
20	MF	Ricardo Villarraga	April 23, 1990 (aged 16)		(Colombia) Santa Fe

=== Uruguay ===
Head coach: (Uruguay) Ronald Marcenaro

No.	Pos.	Player	Date of birth (age)	Caps	Club
1	GK	Nicola Pérez	February 5, 1990 (aged 17)		(Uruguay) Cerro Largo
2	DF	Álvaro Márquez	July 3, 1990 (aged 16)		(Uruguay) Peñarol
3	DF	Martín González	February 9, 1990 (aged 17)		(Uruguay) Wanderers
4	DF	Jonathan Leites	August 22, 1990 (aged 16)		(Uruguay) Danubio
5	MF	Marcelo Lacerda	July 5, 1990 (aged 16)		(Uruguay) Wanderers
6	DF	Mathías Abero	April 9, 1990 (aged 16)		(Uruguay) Nacional
7	FW	**Jonathan Urretavizcaya**	March 19, 1990 (aged 16)		(Uruguay) River Plate
8	FW	Mathías Guzmán	January 12, 1990 (aged 17)		(Uruguay) Danubio
9	FW	Santiago Silva	August 26, 1990 (aged 16)		(Uruguay) Danubio
10	MF	Mauricio Pereyra	March 15, 1990 (aged 16)		(Uruguay) Nacional
11	MF	Rodrigo Pastorini	April 4, 1990 (aged 16)		(Uruguay) Danubio
12	GK	Darwin Nieves	June 24, 1990 (aged 16)		(Uruguay) Liverpool
13	DF	Sebastián Píriz	March 4, 1990 (aged 17)		(Uruguay) Danubio
14	DF	**Sebastián Coates**	October 7, 1990 (aged 16)		(Uruguay) Nacional
15	DF	Juan Cabezas	March 25, 1990 (aged 16)		(Uruguay) Danubio
16	MF	Santiago Mastrángelo	August 6, 1990 (aged 16)		(Uruguay) Peñarol
17	MF	Pablo Lavandeira	May 11, 1990 (aged 16)		(Uruguay) Peñarol
18	MF	Leandro Díaz	March 24, 1990 (aged 16)		(Uruguay) Danubio
19	DF	Luis Martínez	May 14, 1990 (aged 16)		(Uruguay) Danubio
20	MF	Juan Gómez	February 22, 1990 (aged 17)		(Uruguay) Liverpool
