= 2007 FIFA U-17 World Cup =

International football competition

2007 FIFA U-17 월드컵 대한민국
- 2007 FIFA U-17 World Cup official logo

Tournament details
- Host country: South Korea
- Dates: 18 August – 9 September
- Teams: 24 (from 6 confederations)
- Venues: 8 (in 8 host cities)

Final positions
- Champions: Nigeria (3rd title)
- Runners-up: Spain
- Third place: Germany
- Fourth place: Ghana

Tournament statistics
- Matches played: 52
- Goals scored: 165 (3.17 per match)
- Attendance: 422,907 (8,133 per match)
- Top scorer: (Nigeria) Macauley Chrisantus (7 goals)
- Best player: (Germany) Toni Kroos
- Fair play award: Costa Rica

The 2007 FIFA U-17 World Cup was the twelfth edition of the FIFA U-17 World Cup, a biennial international men's youth football tournament contested between the under-17 national teams of the member associations of FIFA. The tournament was held in South Korea between 18 August and 9 September 2007. At that time, it was the second major FIFA tournament to have been held in the country, alongside the 2002 FIFA World Cup which South Korea co-hosted with Japan, and was also the third edition of the U-17 World Cup held in Asia, following China in 1985, and Japan in 1993.

The amount of teams expanded from 16 to 24 since the previous edition of the U-17 World Cup. Also, from this edition onwards, the confederation which produced the last champion, in this case CONCACAF, had an extra spot in the qualifying rounds.

Nigeria won their third title, defeating Spain on penalties in the final, and tied Brazil for the most championships in the tournament, with three each. Mexico were the defending champions, but they failed to qualify for the tournament as a whole.

== Venues ==
Seoul	Suwon	Goyang	Cheonan
Seoul World Cup Stadium	Suwon Civic Stadium	Goyang Stadium	Cheonan Stadium
Capacity: 66,806	Capacity: 24,670	Capacity: 41,311	Capacity: 30,000
2007 FIFA U-17 World Cup (South Korea)
Ulsan	Changwon	Gwangyang	Jeju
Ulsan Stadium	Changwon Civic Stadium	Gwangyang Football Stadium	Jeju World Cup Stadium
Capacity: 19,050	Capacity: 27,085	Capacity: 13,496	Capacity: 42,256

== Teams ==
Confederation	Qualifying Tournament	Qualifier(s)
AFC (Asia)	Host nation	South Korea
AFC (Asia)	AFC U-17 Championship 2006	Japan; North Korea; Tajikistan^{1} Syria^{1}
CAF (Africa)	2007 African Under-17 Championship	Ghana; Nigeria; Togo^{1} Tunisia
CONCACAF (Central, North America and Caribbean)	2007 CONCACAF U17 Tournament	Haiti^{1} Honduras^{1} Costa Rica; United States; Trinidad and Tobago
CONMEBOL (South America)	Sudamericano Sub-17 2007	Brazil; Colombia; Argentina; Peru
OFC (Oceania)	2007 OFC Under 17 Tournament	New Zealand
UEFA (Europe)	2007 UEFA European Under-17 Football Championship	Belgium^{1} England^{1} France; Spain; Germany

1.Teams that made their debut.

== Match officials ==
Confederation	Referee	Assistants
AFC	Matthew Breeze (Australia)	Matthew Cream (Australia); Jim Ouliaris (Australia)
AFC	Yuichi Nishimura (Japan)	Toru Sagara (Japan); Jeong Hae-Sang (South Korea)
AFC	Ravshan Irmatov (Uzbekistan)	Abdukhamidullo Rasulov (Uzbekistan); Bahadyr Kochkarov (Kyrgyzstan)
CAF	Koman Coulibaly (Mali)	Inácio Cândido (Angola); Redouane Achik (Morocco)
CAF	Eddy Maillet (Seychelles)	Bechir Hassani (Tunisia); Evarist Menkouande (Cameroon)
CONCACAF	Joel Aguilar (El Salvador)	Roberto Giron (Honduras); Daniel Williamson (Panama)
CONMEBOL	Sálvio Fagundes (Brazil)	Roberto Braatz (Brazil); Altemir Hausmann (Brazil)
CONMEBOL	Hernando Buitrago (Colombia)	Abraham González (Colombia); Rafael Rivas (Colombia)
OFC	Rakesh Varman (Fiji)	Andrew Achari (Fiji); Matthew Taro (Solomon Islands)
UEFA	Ivan Bebek (Croatia)	Tomislav Petrović (Croatia); Tomislav Šetka (Croatia)
UEFA	Bertrand Layec (France)	Eric Dansault (France); Stephane Duhamel (France)
UEFA	Grzegorz Gilewski (Poland)	Rafał Rostkowski (Poland); Maciej Wierzbowski (Poland)
UEFA	Olegário Benquerença (Portugal)	Bertino Miranda (Portugal); José Cardinal (Portugal)
UEFA	Craig Thomson (Scotland)	Martin Cryans (Scotland); Tom Murphy (Scotland)

== Squads ==
For a list of the squads see 2007 FIFA U-17 World Cup squads.

== Group stage ==
=== Group A ===
Pos	Team	Pld	W	D	L	GF	GA	GD	Pts	Group stage result
1	Peru	3	2	1	0	2	0	+2	7	Advanced to knockout stage
2	Costa Rica	3	1	1	1	3	2	+1	4	Advanced to knockout stage
3	South Korea (H)	3	1	0	2	2	4	−2	3	
4	Togo	3	0	2	1	2	3	−1	2	

(H) Hosts
August 18, 2007
17:00 KST
08:00 UTC

Costa Rica	1–1	Togo
Martínez 81'	Report	Mani 39'

Suwon Sports Complex, Suwon
Attendance: 7,256
Referee: Sálvio Fagundes (Brazil)

August 18, 2007
20:00 KST
11:00 UTC

South Korea	0–1	Peru
	Report	Bazalar 29'

Suwon Sports Complex, Suwon
Attendance: 27,112
Referee: Ivan Bebek (Croatia)

August 21, 2007
17:00 KST
08:00 UTC

Togo	0–0	Peru
	Report

Suwon Sports Complex, Suwon
Attendance: 1,300
Referee: Joel Aguilar (El Salvador)

August 21, 2007
20:00 KST
11:00 UTC

Costa Rica	2–0	South Korea
Ureña 85'; Peralta 90+1'	Report

Suwon Sports Complex, Suwon
Attendance: 23,120
Referee: Grzegorz Gilewski (Poland)

August 24, 2007
20:00 KST
11:00 UTC

South Korea	2–1	Togo
Seol Jae-mun 45+1'; Yoon Bit-garam 80'	Report	Atakora 20'

Ulsan Stadium, Ulsan
Attendance: 22,000
Referee: Bertrand Layec (France)

August 24, 2007
20:00 KST
11:00 UTC

Peru	1–0	Costa Rica
Bazalar 89'	Report

Jeju World Cup Stadium, Seogwipo
Attendance: 510
Referee: Eddy Maillet (Seychelles)

=== Group B ===
Pos	Team	Pld	W	D	L	GF	GA	GD	Pts	Group stage result
1	England	3	2	1	0	8	2	+6	7	Advanced to knockout stage
2	Brazil	3	2	0	1	14	3	+11	6	Advanced to knockout stage
3	North Korea	3	1	1	1	3	7	−4	4	Advanced to knockout stage
4	New Zealand	3	0	0	3	0	13	−13	0	

August 18, 2007
14:00 KST
05:00 UTC

North Korea	1–1	England
Rim Chol-min 89'	Report	Moses 62'

Jeju World Cup Stadium, Seogwipo
Attendance: 12,600
Referee: Eddy Maillet (Seychelles)

August 18, 2007
17:00 KST
08:00 UTC

Brazil	7–0	New Zealand
Fabinho 1'; Lázaro 6'; Giuliano 33'; Fábio 50'; Teixeira 54'; Lulinha 60' (pen.); Junior 87'	Report

Jeju World Cup Stadium, Seogwipo
Attendance: 8,500
Referee: Grzegorz Gilewski (Poland)

August 21, 2007
17:00 KST
08:00 UTC

New Zealand	0–5	England
	Report	Welbeck 3', 27'; Moses 7', 30'; Chambers 88'

Jeju World Cup Stadium, Jeju
Attendance: 2,500
Referee: Bertrand Layec (France)

August 21, 2007
20:00 KST
11:00 UTC

Brazil	6–1	North Korea
Fábio 4', 8'; Teixeira 6'; Maicon 22'; Giuliano 47'; Choco 90'	Report	An Il-bom 24'

Jeju World Cup Stadium, Jeju
Attendance: 13,500
Referee: Ravshan Irmatov (Uzbekistan)

August 24, 2007
17:00 KST
08:00 UTC

North Korea	1–0	New Zealand
Rim Chol-min 81'	Report

Ulsan Stadium, Ulsan
Attendance: 6,000
Referee: Olegário Benquerença (Portugal)

August 24, 2007
17:00 KST
08:00 UTC

England	2–1	Brazil
Lansbury 45' (pen.); Spence 90'	Report	Tales 19'

Goyang Stadium, Goyang
Attendance: 9,600
Referee: Ivan Bebek (Croatia)

=== Group C ===
Pos	Team	Pld	W	D	L	GF	GA	GD	Pts	Group stage result
1	Spain	3	2	1	0	7	4	+3	7	Advanced to knockout stage
2	Argentina	3	1	2	0	5	2	+3	5	Advanced to knockout stage
3	Syria	3	1	1	1	3	2	+1	4	Advanced to knockout stage
4	Honduras	3	0	0	3	3	10	−7	0	

August 19, 2007
16:00 KST
07:00 UTC

Honduras	2–4	Spain
Martínez 20'; Rojas 72'	Report	Bojan 2', 71'; Pablo 56', 81'

Ulsan Stadium, Ulsan
Attendance: 4,800
Referee: Matthew Breeze (Australia)

August 19, 2007
19:00 KST
10:00 UTC

Argentina	0–0	Syria
	Report

Ulsan Stadium, Ulsan
Attendance: 8,100
Referee: Bertrand Layec (France)

August 22, 2007
17:00 KST
08:00 UTC

Syria	1–2	Spain
Solaiman 70' (pen.)	Report	Mérida 56'; Aquino 90+1'

Ulsan Stadium, Ulsan
Attendance: 3,200
Referee: Craig Thomson (Scotland)

August 22, 2007
20:00 KST
11:00 UTC

Argentina	4–1	Honduras
Meza 45+1'; Mazzola 64', 87'; Machuca 71'	Report	Leverón 35' (pen.)

Ulsan Stadium, Ulsan
Attendance: 3,000
Referee: Yuichi Nishimura (Japan)

August 25, 2007
16:00 KST
07:00 UTC

Honduras	0–2	Syria
	Report	Al Taiar 22'; Al Saleh 80'

Jeju World Cup Stadium, Jeju
Attendance: 430
Referee: Rakesh Varman (Fiji)

August 25, 2007
16:00 KST
07:00 UTC

Spain	1–1	Argentina
Aquino 68'	Report	Benítez 32'

Gwangyang Football Stadium, Gwangyang
Attendance: 5,500
Referee: Ravshan Irmatov (Uzbekistan)

=== Group D ===
Pos	Team	Pld	W	D	L	GF	GA	GD	Pts	Group stage result
1	Nigeria	3	3	0	0	9	2	+7	9	Advanced to knockout stage
2	France	3	1	1	1	4	4	0	4	Advanced to knockout stage
3	Japan	3	1	0	2	4	6	−2	3	
4	Haiti	3	0	1	2	3	8	−5	1	

August 19, 2007
16:00 KST
07:00 UTC

Nigeria	2–1	France
Chrisantus 15'; Ibrahim 64'	Report	Saivet 51'

Gwangyang Football Stadium, Gwangyang
Attendance: 8,500
Referee: Craig Thomson (Scotland)

August 19, 2007
19:00 KST
10:00 UTC

Japan	3–1	Haiti
Okamoto 42'; Kawano 80'; Kakitani 84'	Report	Guemsly 71'

Gwangyang Football Stadium, Gwangyang
Attendance: 8,500
Referee: Rakesh Varman (Fiji)

August 22, 2007
17:00 KST
08:00 UTC

Haiti	1–1	France
Desrivieres 21' (pen.)	Report	Le Tallec 13'

Gwangyang Football Stadium, Gwangyang
Attendance: 4,500
Referee: Eddy Maillet (Seychelles)

August 22, 2007
20:00 KST
11:00 UTC

Japan	0–3	Nigeria
	Report	Oseni 21'; Chrisantus 31', 82'

Gwangyang Stadium, Gwangyang
Attendance: 4,500
Referee: Ivan Bebek (Croatia)

August 25, 2007
19:00 KST
10:00 UTC

Nigeria	4–1	Haiti
Chrisantus 5', 60'; Isa 39', 41'	Report	Joseph 57'

Jeju World Cup Stadium, Jeju
Attendance: 520
Referee: Matthew Breeze (Australia)

August 25, 2007
19:00 KST
10:00 UTC

France	2–1	Japan
Mehamha 68'; Rivière 70'	Report	Kakitani 45'

Goyang Stadium, Goyang
Attendance: 11,054
Referee: Grzegorz Gilewski (Poland)

=== Group E ===
Pos	Team	Pld	W	D	L	GF	GA	GD	Pts	Group stage result
1	Tunisia	3	3	0	0	8	3	+5	9	Advanced to knockout stage
2	United States	3	1	0	2	6	7	−1	3	Advanced to knockout stage
3	Tajikistan	3	1	0	2	4	5	−1	3	Advanced to knockout stage
4	Belgium	3	1	0	2	3	6	−3	3	

August 20, 2007
17:00 KST
08:00 UTC

Belgium	2–4	Tunisia
De Pauw 27'; Kis 36'	Report	Boughanmi 20'; Ayrai 24'; Msakni 42', 79' (pen.)

Changwon Sports Park, Changwon
Attendance: 8,230
Referee: Yuichi Nishimura (Japan)

August 20, 2007
20:00 KST
11:00 UTC

Tajikistan	4–3	United States
Vasiev 32'; Shohzukhurov 43'; Davronov 82'; Fatkhuloev 86'	Report	Bates 9'; Garza 48'; Schuler 53'

Changwon Sports Park, Changwon
Attendance: 4,570
Referee: Koman Coulibaly (Mali)

August 23, 2007
17:00 KST
08:00 UTC

United States	1–3	Tunisia
Jeffrey 90' (pen.)	Report	Hadhria 8' (pen.), 45+1' (pen.); Dkhil 90+4'

Changwon Sports Park, Changwon
Attendance: 3,115
Referee: Hernando Buitrago (Colombia)

August 23, 2007
20:00 KST
11:00 UTC

Tajikistan	0–1	Belgium
	Report	Benteke 90+2'

Changwon Sports Park, Changwon
Attendance: 1,400
Referee: Rakesh Varman (Fiji)

August 26, 2007
16:00 KST
07:00 UTC

Belgium	0–2	United States
	Report	Urso 63'; Bates 71'

Cheonan Stadium, Cheonan
Attendance: 14,927
Referee: Sálvio Fagundes (Brazil)

August 26, 2007
16:00 KST
07:00 UTC

Tunisia	1–0	Tajikistan
Msakni 83'	Report

Suwon Sports Complex, Suwon
Attendance: 1,235
Referee: Joel Aguilar (El Salvador)

=== Group F ===
Pos	Team	Pld	W	D	L	GF	GA	GD	Pts	Group stage result
1	Germany	3	2	1	0	11	5	+6	7	Advanced to knockout stage
2	Ghana	3	2	0	1	8	5	+3	6	Advanced to knockout stage
3	Colombia	3	1	1	1	9	5	+4	4	Advanced to knockout stage
4	Trinidad and Tobago	3	0	0	3	1	14	−13	0	

August 20, 2007
17:00 KST
08:00 UTC

Colombia	3–3	Germany
Julio 14'; Nazarit 66' (pen.), 88'	Report	Dowidat 34', 49'; Sukuta-Pasu 39'

Cheonan Stadium, Cheonan
Attendance: 7,741
Referee: Olegário Benquerença (Portugal)

August 20, 2007
20:00 KST
11:00 UTC

Trinidad and Tobago	1–4	Ghana
Campbell 80'	Report	Osei 12', 44'; Adams 45+1'; Bossman 85'

Cheonan Stadium, Cheonan
Attendance: 11,521
Referee: Sálvio Fagundes (Brazil)

August 23, 2007
17:00 KST
08:00 UTC

Ghana	2–3	Germany
Osei 52'; Adams 53'	Report	Bigalke 5'; Kroos 12', 27'

Cheonan Stadium, Cheonan
Attendance: 7,516
Referee: Joel Aguilar (El Salvador)

August 23, 2007
20:00 KST
11:00 UTC

Trinidad and Tobago	0–5	Colombia
	Report	Mosquera G. 22', 63'; Trellez 60'; Pardo 68'; Serna 72'

Cheonan Stadium, Cheonan
Attendance: 13,537
Referee: Koman Coulibaly (Mali)

August 26, 2007
19:00 KST
10:00 UTC

Colombia	1–2	Ghana
Nazarit 60'	Report	Osei 32'; Yartey 87'

Ulsan Stadium, Ulsan
Attendance: 8,500
Referee: Craig Thomson (Scotland)

August 26, 2007
19:00 KST
10:00 UTC

Germany	5–0	Trinidad and Tobago
Broghammer 5'; Esswein 30', 37'; Funk 39'; Wolze 90+3'	Report

Changwon Sports Park, Changwon
Attendance: 4,320
Referee: Yuichi Nishimura (Japan)

=== Ranking of third-placed teams ===
Pos	Grp	Team	Pld	W	D	L	GF	GA	GD	Pts	Group stage result
1	F	Colombia	3	1	1	1	9	5	+4	4	Advanced to knockout stage
2	C	Syria	3	1	1	1	3	2	+1	4	Advanced to knockout stage
3	B	North Korea	3	1	1	1	3	7	−4	4	Advanced to knockout stage
4	E	Tajikistan	3	1	0	2	4	5	−1	3	Advanced to knockout stage
5	D	Japan	3	1	0	2	4	6	−2	3	
6	A	South Korea	3	1	0	2	2	4	−2	3	

== Knockout stages ==
Round of 16
29 August - Ulsan
Spain	3
North Korea	0
29 August - Changwon
Tunisia	1
France (a.e.t.)	3
29 August - Suwon
Peru (pen.)	1 (5)
Tajikistan	1 (4)
29 August - Gwangyang
Ghana	1
Brazil	0
30 August - Goyang
Argentina	2
Costa Rica	0
30 August - Gwangyang
Nigeria	2
Colombia	1
30 August - Jeju
England	3
Syria	1
30 August - Cheonan
Germany	2
United States	1

Quarter-finals
1 September - Jeju
Spain (pen.)	1 (5)
France	1 (4)
1 September - Changwon
Peru	0
Ghana	2
2 September - Cheonan
Argentina	0
Nigeria	2
2 September - Goyang
England	1
Germany	4

Semi-finals
5 September - Ulsan
Spain (a.e.t.)	2
Ghana	1
6 September - Suwon
Nigeria	3
Germany	1

Final
9 September - Seoul
Spain	0 (0)
Nigeria (pen.)	0 (3)
Third place
9 September - Seoul
Ghana	1
Germany	2

=== Round of 16 ===
August 29, 2007
17:00 KST
08:00 UTC

Spain	3–0	North Korea
Bojan 28', 50'; Falque 67'	Report

Ulsan Stadium, Ulsan
Attendance: 8,500
Referee: Sálvio Fagundes (Brazil)

August 29, 2007
17:00 KST
08:00 UTC

Tunisia	1–3 (a.e.t.)	France
Hadhria 49'	Report	Saivet 43'; Le Tallec 99', 105'

Changwon Sports Park, Changwon
Attendance: 2,150
Referee: Ravshan Irmatov (Uzbekistan)

August 29, 2007
20:00 KST
11:00 UTC

Peru	1–1 (a.e.t.)	Tajikistan
Manco 13'	Report	Davronov 15'
Penalties
Trujillo (penalty scored); Calderón (penalty scored); Ruiz (penalty scored); Manco (penalty scored); Ávila (penalty scored)	5–4	(penalty missed) Vasiev; (penalty scored) Radzhabov; (penalty scored) Abdulloev; (penalty scored) Fatkhuloev; (penalty scored) Tukhtasunov

Suwon Sports Complex, Suwon
Attendance: 1,150
Referee: Matthew Breeze (Australia)

August 29, 2007
20:00 KST
11:00 UTC

Ghana	1–0	Brazil
Donkor 51'	Report

Gwangyang Football Stadium, Gwangyang
Attendance: 5,500
Referee: Grzegorz Gilewski (Poland)

August 30, 2007
17:00 KST
08:00 UTC

Argentina	2–0	Costa Rica
Sauro 25', 41'	Report

Goyang Stadium, Goyang
Attendance: 5,698
Referee: Olegário Benquerença (Portugal)

August 30, 2007
17:00 KST
08:00 UTC

Nigeria	2–1	Colombia
Isa 78'; Alfa 83'	Report	Trellez 62'

Gwangyang Football Stadium, Gwangyang
Attendance: 4,500
Referee: Ivan Bebek (Croatia)

August 30, 2007
20:00 KST
11:00 UTC

England	3–1	Syria
Lansbury 17' (pen.); Pearce 45+2'; Murphy 62'	Report	Ajouz 51'

Jeju World Cup Stadium, Jeju
Attendance: 1,650
Referee: Hernando Buitrago (Colombia)

August 30, 2007
20:00 KST
11:00 UTC

Germany	2–1	United States
Sukuta-Pasu 65', 89'	Report	Bates 90+2'

Cheonan Stadium, Cheonan
Attendance: 15,069
Referee: Craig Thomson (Scotland)

=== Quarterfinals ===
September 1, 2007
16:00 KST
07:00 UTC

Spain	1–1 (a.e.t.)	France
Jordi 72'	Report	Le Tallec 52'
Penalties
Nacho (penalty scored); Rodri (penalty scored); Bojan (penalty scored); Mérida (penalty scored); Aquino (penalty scored)	5–4	(penalty scored) Sakho; (penalty scored) Le Tallec; (penalty missed) Bourgeois; (penalty scored) M'Vila; (penalty scored) N'Diaye

Jeju World Cup Stadium, Jeju
Attendance: 2,310
Referee: Joel Aguilar (El Salvador)

September 1, 2007
19:00 KST
10:00 UTC

Peru	0–2	Ghana
	Report	Adams 45+1'; Osei 53'

Changwon Sports Park, Changwon
Attendance: 7,555
Referee: Yuichi Nishimura (Japan)

September 2, 2007
16:00 KST
07:00 UTC

Argentina	0–2	Nigeria
	Report	Haruna 33' (pen.); Chrisantus 45+2'

Cheonan Stadium, Cheonan
Attendance: 14,581
Referee: Matthew Breeze (Australia)

September 2, 2007
19:00 KST
10:00 UTC

England	1–4	Germany
Murphy 65'	Report	Rudy 50'; Sukuta-Pasu 56'; Dowidat 74'; Kroos 87'

Goyang Stadium, Goyang
Attendance: 12,560
Referee: Sálvio Fagundes (Brazil)

=== Semifinals ===
September 5, 2007
19:00 KST
10:00 UTC

Spain	2–1 (a.e.t.)	Ghana
Aquino 67'; Bojan 116'	Report	Adams 80'

Ulsan Stadium, Ulsan
Attendance: 9,700
Referee: Sálvio Fagundes (Brazil)

September 6, 2007
19:00 KST
10:00 UTC

Nigeria	3–1	Germany
Chrisantus 10'; Alfa 18'; Akinsola 90+4'	Report	Kroos 33'

Suwon Sports Complex, Suwon
Attendance: 3,472
Referee: Joel Aguilar (El Salvador)

=== Third place match ===
September 9, 2007
16:00 KST
07:00 UTC

Ghana	1–2	Germany
Osei 67'	Report	Kroos 17'; Esswein 90+2'

Seoul World Cup Stadium, Seoul
Attendance: 22,345
Referee: Olegário Benquerença (Portugal)

=== Final ===
September 9, 2007
19:00 KST
10:00 UTC

Spain	0–0 (a.e.t.)	Nigeria
	Report
Penalties
Illarramendi (penalty missed); Mérida (penalty missed); Falque (penalty missed)	0–3	(penalty scored) Edile; (penalty scored) Joshua; (penalty scored) Oseni

Seoul World Cup Stadium, Seoul
Attendance: 36,125
Referee: Yuichi Nishimura (Japan)

== Winners ==
2007 FIFA U-17 World Cup winners

Nigeria
Third title

== Awards ==
Golden Ball	Silver Ball	Bronze Ball
(Germany) Toni Kroos	(Nigeria) Macauley Chrisantus	(Spain) Bojan
Golden Shoe	Silver Shoe	Bronze Shoe
(Nigeria) Macauley Chrisantus	(Ghana) Ransford Osei	(Germany) Toni Kroos

== Goalscorers ==
There were 165 goals scored in 52 matches, for an average of 3.17 goals per match.

7 goals

- (Nigeria) Macauley Chrisantus

6 goals

- (Ghana) Ransford Osei

5 goals

- (Germany) Toni Kroos
- (Spain) Bojan

4 goals

- (France) Damien Le Tallec
- (Germany) Richard Sukuta-Pasu
- (Ghana) Sadick Adams

3 goals

- (Brazil) Fábio
- (Colombia) Cristian Nazarit
- (England) Victor Moses
- (Germany) Dennis Dowidat
- (Germany) Alexander Esswein
- (Nigeria) Sheriff Isa
- (Spain) Dani Aquino
- (Spain) Jordi Pablo
- (Tunisia) Nour Hadhria
- (Tunisia) Youssef Msakni
- (United States) Mykell Bates

2 goals

- (Argentina) Nicolás Mazzola
- (Argentina) Gastón Sauro
- (Brazil) Giuliano
- (Brazil) Alex Teixeira
- (Colombia) Andrés Mosquera Guardia
- (Colombia) Santiago Trellez
- (England) Henri Lansbury
- (England) Rhys Murphy
- (England) Danny Welbeck
- (France) Henri Saivet
- (Japan) Yoichiro Kakitani
- (Nigeria) Yakubu Alfa
- (North Korea) Rim Chol-min
- (Peru) Carlos Bazalar
- (Tajikistan) Nuriddin Davronov

1 goal

- (Argentina) Carlos Benítez
- (Argentina) Alexis Machuca
- (Argentina) Fernando Meza
- (Belgium) Christian Benteke
- (Belgium) Nill De Pauw
- (Belgium) Kevin Kis
- (Brazil) Fabinho
- (Brazil) Choco
- (Brazil) Lázaro
- (Brazil) Lulinha
- (Brazil) Junior
- (Brazil) Maicon
- (Brazil) Tales
- (Colombia) Miguel Julio
- (Colombia) Felipe Pardo
- (Colombia) Ricardo Serna
- (Costa Rica) Josué Martínez
- (Costa Rica) Marco Ureña
- (Costa Rica) Jessy Peralta
- (England) Ashley Chambers
- (England) Jordan Spence
- (England) Krystian Pearce
- (France) Saïd Mehamha
- (France) Emmanuel Rivière
- (Germany) Sascha Bigalke
- (Germany) Fabian Broghammer
- (Germany) Patrick Funk
- (Germany) Kevin Wolze
- (Germany) Sebastian Rudy
- (Ghana) Kelvin Bossman
- (Ghana) Ishmael Yartey
- (Ghana) Isaac Donkor
- (Haiti) Peterson Desrivieres
- (Haiti) Joseph Guemsly Jr.
- (Haiti) Peterson Joseph
- (Honduras) Johnny Leverón
- (Honduras) Christian Samir Martínez
- (Honduras) Roger Rojas
- (Japan) Tomotaka Okamoto
- (Japan) Hiroki Kawano
- (North Korea) An Il-bom
- (South Korea) Seol Jae-mun
- (South Korea) Yoon Bit-garam
- (Nigeria) Kabiru Akinsola
- (Nigeria) Rabiu Ibrahim
- (Nigeria) Ganiyu Oseni
- (Nigeria) Lukman Haruna
- (Peru) Reimond Manco
- (Spain) Fran Mérida
- (Spain) Iago Falque
- (Syria) Ahmad Al Saleh
- (Syria) Hani Al Taiar
- (Syria) Solaiman Solaiman
- (Syria) Ziad Ajouz
- (Tajikistan) Farkhod Vosiyev
- (Tajikistan) Samad Shohzukhurov
- (Tajikistan) Fatkhullo Fatkhuloev
- (Togo) Lalawélé Atakora
- (Togo) Sapol Mani
- (Trinidad and Tobago) Stephan Campbell
- (Tunisia) Khaled Ayari
- (Tunisia) Oussama Boughanmi
- (Tunisia) Rafik Dkhil
- (United States) Greg Garza
- (United States) Jared Jeffrey
- (United States) Billy Schuler
- (United States) Kirk Urso

== Final ranking ==
Rank	Team	Pld	W	D	L	GF	GA	GD	Pts
1	Nigeria	7	6	1	0	16	4	+12	19
2	Spain	7	4	3	0	12	6	+6	15
3	Germany	7	5	1	1	20	11	+9	16
4	Ghana	7	4	0	3	13	9	+4	12
Eliminated in the quarter-finals
5	England	5	3	1	1	12	7	+5	10
6	Argentina	5	2	2	1	7	4	+3	8
7	France	5	2	2	1	8	6	+2	8
8	Peru	5	2	2	1	3	3	0	8
Eliminated in the Round of 16
9	Tunisia	4	3	0	1	9	6	+3	9
10	Brazil	4	2	0	2	14	4	+10	6
11	Colombia	4	1	1	2	10	7	+3	4
12	Tajikistan	4	1	1	2	5	6	–1	4
13	Syria	4	1	1	2	4	5	–1	4
14	Costa Rica	4	1	1	2	3	4	–1	4
15	North Korea	4	1	1	2	3	10	–7	4
16	United States	4	1	0	3	7	9	–2	3
Eliminated in group stage
17	Japan	3	1	0	2	4	6	–2	3
18	South Korea	3	1	0	2	2	4	–2	3
19	Belgium	3	1	0	2	3	6	–3	3
20	Togo	3	0	2	1	2	3	–1	2
21	Haiti	3	0	1	2	3	8	–5	1
22	Honduras	3	0	0	3	3	10	–7	0
23	Trinidad and Tobago	3	0	0	3	1	14	–13	0
24	New Zealand	3	0	0	3	0	13	–13	0
