= Anthony Molina =

Anthony Molina may refer to:

- Anthony Molina (baseball) (born 2002), Venezuelan baseball player
- Anthony Molina (footballer) (born 1990), Peruvian football player

== See also ==
- Anthony Molino (born 1957), American translator
