= Alex Sandro =

Brazilian footballer (born 1991)

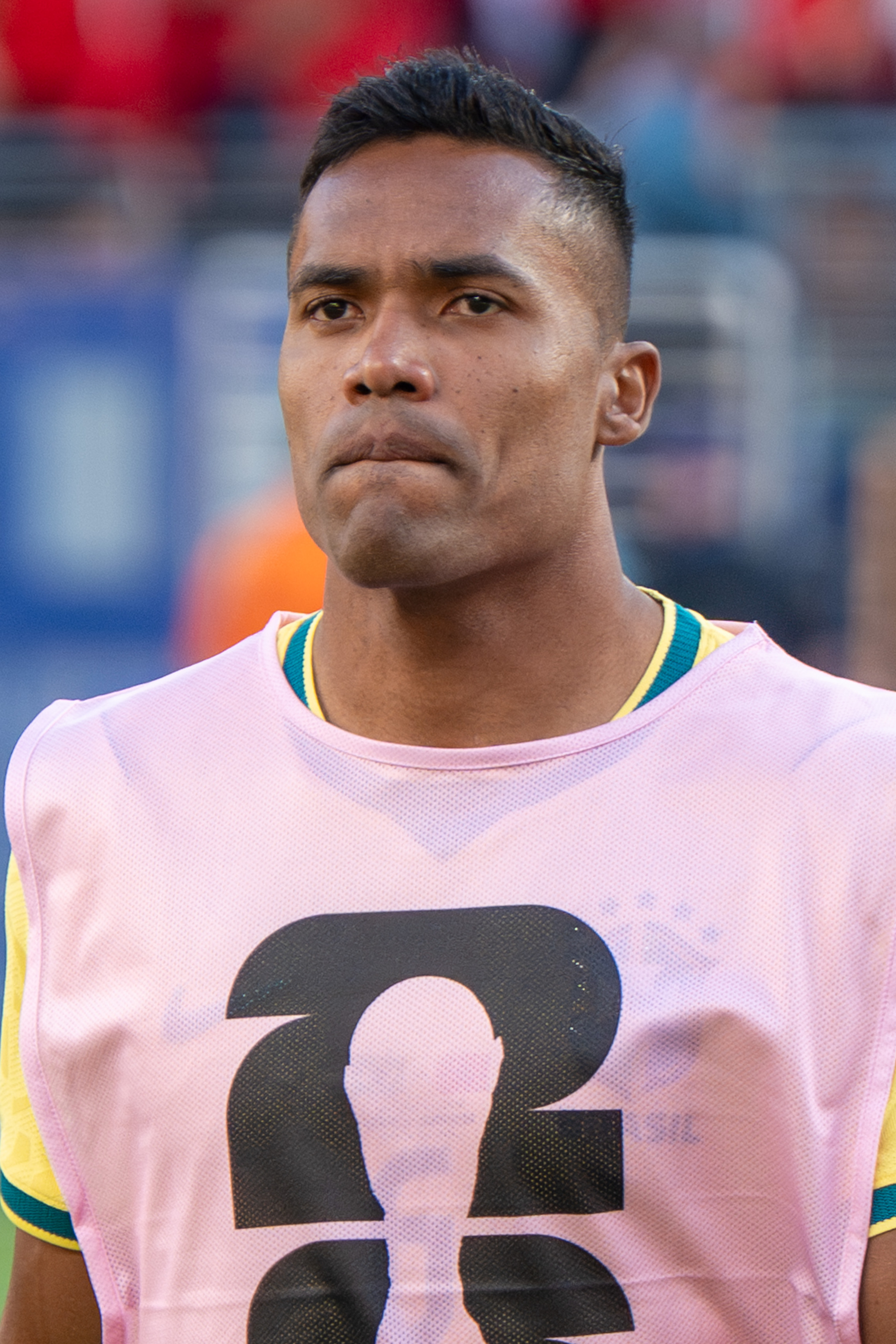
- Alex Sandro with Brazil in 2026

Personal information
- Full name: Alex Sandro Lobo Silva
- Date of birth: 26 January 1991 (age 35)
- Place of birth: Catanduva, São Paulo, Brazil
- Height: 1.80 m (5 ft 11 in)
- Position: Left-back

Team information
- Current team: Flamengo
- Number: 26

Youth career
- 2006–2008: Atlético Paranaense

Senior career*
Years	Team	Apps	(Gls)
2008–2010	Atlético Paranaense	25	(1)
2010–2011	Deportivo Maldonado	0	(0)
2010–2011	→ Santos (loan)	38	(2)
2011–2015	Porto	87	(3)
2015–2024	Juventus	230	(14)
2024–	Flamengo	51	(0)

International career^{‡}
2011	Brazil U20	11	(0)
2012	Brazil U23	3	(0)
2011–2026	Brazil	46	(2)
Medal record
Representing Brazil
Men's Football
Copa América
Winner	2019 Brazil
Runner-up	2021 Brazil
FIFA U-20 World Cup
Winner	2011 Colombia
South American U-20 Championship
Winner	2011 Peru
- * Club domestic league appearances and goals as of 03:50, 23 July 2026 (UTC) ‡ National team caps and goals as of 03:52, 25 June 2026 (UTC)

Alex Sandro Lobo Silva (born 26 January 1991), better known as Alex Sandro (Brazilian Portuguese: [aˈlɛks ˈsɐ̃dɾu]) is a Brazilian professional footballer who plays as a left-back for Campeonato Brasileiro Série A club Flamengo.

At club level, Alex Sandro began his career with Atletico Paranaense and later also played for Santos on loan. In 2011, he joined Porto for €9.6 million, alongside former teammate and countryman Danilo who played as a right-back. Joining Juventus in 2015, winning the domestic double in his first three seasons, followed by two more consecutive league titles over the following two years.

At international level, Alex Sandro represents Brazil, for which he has gained over 40 caps. At youth level, he also represented the Brazil under-20 team, winning both the South American Youth Championship and the FIFA U-20 World Cup in 2011. He was also part of the Brazil squad that won the 2019 Copa América.

== Club career ==
=== Atletico Paranaense ===
After winning an impressive amount of honours with the Atletico Paranaense youth setup and a very good performance in the Copa Parana with the U23 side, Alex Sandro earned his first call up to the senior side in October 2008. He played one game in the Brasileiro, taking on Internacional on 18 October.

In 2009, Alex Sandro played a role in Atletico's championship run in the Campeonato Paranaense, playing in eight matches. He scored his first goal on 25 January against Rio Branco, passing the ball to himself around the keeper. As of October 2009, he has played in nine Brasileiro matches, playing a total of 269 minutes.

=== Santos ===
Alex Sandro was signed by Santos in 2010 on a two-year loan deal. Atletico Paranaense sold him to the investors, using Uruguayan club Deportivo Maldonado as a proxy to hold the registration rights. According to Atletico Paranaense's 2010 financial report, the club received R$1,114,000 from Deportivo Maldonado for transactions of unnamed players.

=== Porto ===
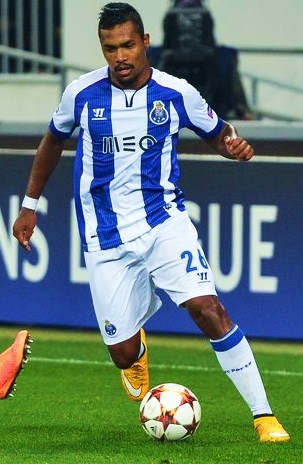
Alex Sandro with Porto in 2014

On 23 July 2011, Portuguese Primeira Liga club Porto signed Alex Sandro for €9.6 million from the proxy club Deportivo Maldonado. He signed a five-year contract with a release clause of €50 million.

=== Juventus ===
==== 2015–16 ====
On 20 August 2015, Alex Sandro joined Italian Serie A champions Juventus for €26 million on a five-year contract. He made his club debut on 12 September 2015 in a 1–1 home draw against Chievo in Serie A. Defending champions Juventus endured a difficult start to the season, and were in the bottom half of the table by late October. The club mounted a comeback that started with a last-gasp Turin derby win on 31 October, with the Brazilian left-back playing a key role in that upturn.

On 21 November 2015, Sandro assisted Paulo Dybala with a cross, helping Juventus beat rival side AC Milan 1–0 in Serie A. Four days later, on 25 November, he assisted another winning goal, for Mario Mandžukić, in a 1–0 home win over Manchester City in the UEFA Champions League to secure the club a spot in the round of 16 of the competition. On 17 January 2016, Alex Sandro scored his first Juventus goal – and his first in Serie A – from the top of the 18-yard box in the 42nd minute of a 4–0 away win over Udinese.

On 17 February, it was confirmed Alex Sandro would be sidelined for ten days after he picked up an injury to his rectus femoris muscle in his left thigh during training at the Juventus Center the day before, forcing him to miss out on the first leg of the round of 16 of the Champions League on 23 February against Bayern Munich. He returned for the second leg in Munich, where he could not prevent his team's elimination despite putting on a strong individual performance.

The Brazilian completed his first season in Turin winning a Serie A–Coppa Italia double. He came on as a substitute for Patrice Evra in the Coppa Italia final against Milan at the Stadio Olimpico in Rome, which was decided by an Álvaro Morata lone goal in extra time.

==== 2016–17 ====
Despite scoring an own goal in a 3–1 away defeat to Genoa, Alex Sandro carried his form of the previous season into the new one. A series of impressive performances saw him displace incumbent Patrice Evra from the starting left back role. The Frenchman eventually moved to Marseille in January 2017.

Alex Sandro completed the season with 43 appearances across competitions, 11 more than the previous year. That made him one of the most frequently used players by coach Massimiliano Allegri. From a statistical standpoint, the Brazilian also further improved his goalscoring output, netting three times in the league as Juventus completed a third successive league and cup double.

The one trophy that evaded Alex Sandro was the UEFA Champions League, which saw his side lose 4–1 in the final to holders Real Madrid at the Millennium Stadium in Cardiff. Alex Sandro played a key role in Mario Mandžukić's temporary equaliser in the first half, supplying the cross that was chested down to the Croatian by Gonzalo Higuaín. In the second half, however, Alex Sandro's and his teammates' performances were less convincing, and one of Alex Sandro's mistakes led to a goal from his former Brazil Under-20 and Porto colleague Casemiro.

Prior to the final he had played a vital role in the Bianconeri's run, especially in the quarter-finals against Barcelona, where excellent defensive performances helped to neutralise the attacking threat of Lionel Messi, and enabled Juventus to keep clean sheets across both legs of the tie.

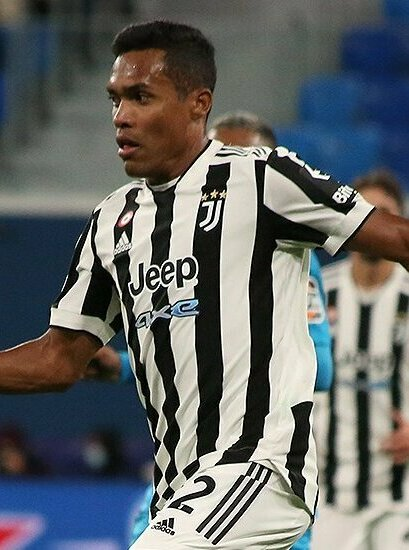
Alex Sandro playing for Juventus in 2021

==== 2017–18 ====
In his third season with Juventus, Alex Sandro made 39 appearances for Juventus in all competitions, scoring four goals, all of which came in Serie A, from 26 league appearances; he finished the 2017–18 season by winning a third consecutive domestic double with the club.

==== 2018–19 ====
On 23 October 2018, Alex Sandro made his 50th UEFA Champions League appearance (excluding qualifying rounds) in a 1–0 away win over Manchester United. He made his 100th Serie A appearance with Juventus on 30 March 2019, in a 1–0 home win over Empoli. In Juventus's following league match on 2 April, a 2–0 away win over Cagliari, he made his 150th appearance for the club. On 20 April, he scored the temporary equalizer as Juventus came from behind to defeat rivals Fiorentina 2–1 at home and win the Serie A title.

==== 2019–20 ====
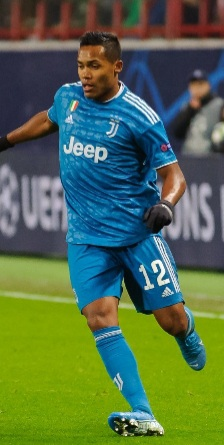
Alex Sandro playing for Juventus in the 2019–20 UEFA Champions League

On 24 August 2019, on the opening match day of the 2019–20 Serie A season, Alex Sandro assisted Giorgio Chiellini's goal in a 1–0 away win against Parma. On 18 December, he provided two assists, one for Paulo Dybala and another for Cristiano Ronaldo, in a 2–1 away win against Sampdoria.

==== 2023–24 ====
On 25 May 2024, Alex Sandro scored the last goal of the season for Juventus from a header in his final game for the club, helping his side to a 2–0 Serie A victory against Monza, which saw the team finish in third place in the league, qualifying for the Champions League the following season. During the match, he made his 327th appearance for Juventus, equalling Pavel Nedvěd's record of the most appearances for the club by a non–Italian player.

=== Flamengo ===
On 26 August 2024, Alex Sandro joined Brazilian club Flamengo. He signed a contract until 31 December 2026. Alex Sandro debuted in a Campeonato Brasileiro Série A match between Flamengo and Vasco da Gama, held on 15 September 2024, that ended in a 1–1 draw. He scored his first goal with the Flamengo shirt in the 1–0 victory over Corinthians on 2 October 2024, at Maracanã, in the first leg of the semi-final of the Copa do Brasil.

== International career ==
=== Youth ===
Alex Sandro is a part of the golden Atlético Paranaense youth setup, which has produced a great amount of defenders in very little time, with Raul, Manoel, Ronaldo Alves, Carlão and Bruno Costa all making themselves known in 2009. After being a part of the Brazil under-18 setup, Alex Sandro was called up to the under-20 side in August 2009, alongside teammates Raul, Renan Foguinho and Gabriel Pimba. He made his debut in a friendly match at 18 years of age.

He was a member of the teams that won the 2011 South American Youth Championship in Peru, as well as the 2011 FIFA U-20 World Cup in Colombia, also featuring in the final of the tournament against Portugal, which Brazil won 3–2 in extra-time.

Alex Sandro was also a member of the Brazil team that won a silver medal at the 2012 Summer Olympics in London; he started in the 2–1 defeat to Mexico in the final of the tournament.

=== Senior ===
Alex Sandro made his senior international debut on 10 November 2011 in a 2–0 away win over Gabon. He scored his first international goal on 12 October 2018, in a 2–0 friendly away win over Saudi Arabia.

In May 2019, Sandro was included in Brazil's 23-man squad for the 2019 Copa América on home soil by manager Tite. In Brazil's final group match on 22 June, a 5–0 win against Peru, Sandro made a substitute appearance, coming on for Filipe Luís. In the quarter-final match against Paraguay on 27 June, he once again made a substitute appearance, replacing the injured Filipe Luís at half-time; following a 0–0 draw, Brazil advanced to the semi-finals 4–3 on penalties. Sandro started in the 2019 Copa América Final against Peru on 7 July, at the Maracanã Stadium; the match ended in a 3–1 victory to Brazil.

On 17 June 2021, he scored the opening goal in a 4–0 win over Peru in Brazil's second group match of the 2021 Copa América, which took place on home soil. He remained on the bench in Brazil's 1–0 defeat to Argentina in the final.

On 7 November 2022, Alex Sandro was named in the squad for the 2022 FIFA World Cup. On 18 May 2026, Alex Sandro was selected for Brazil's squad for the 2026 FIFA World Cup.

== Style of play ==
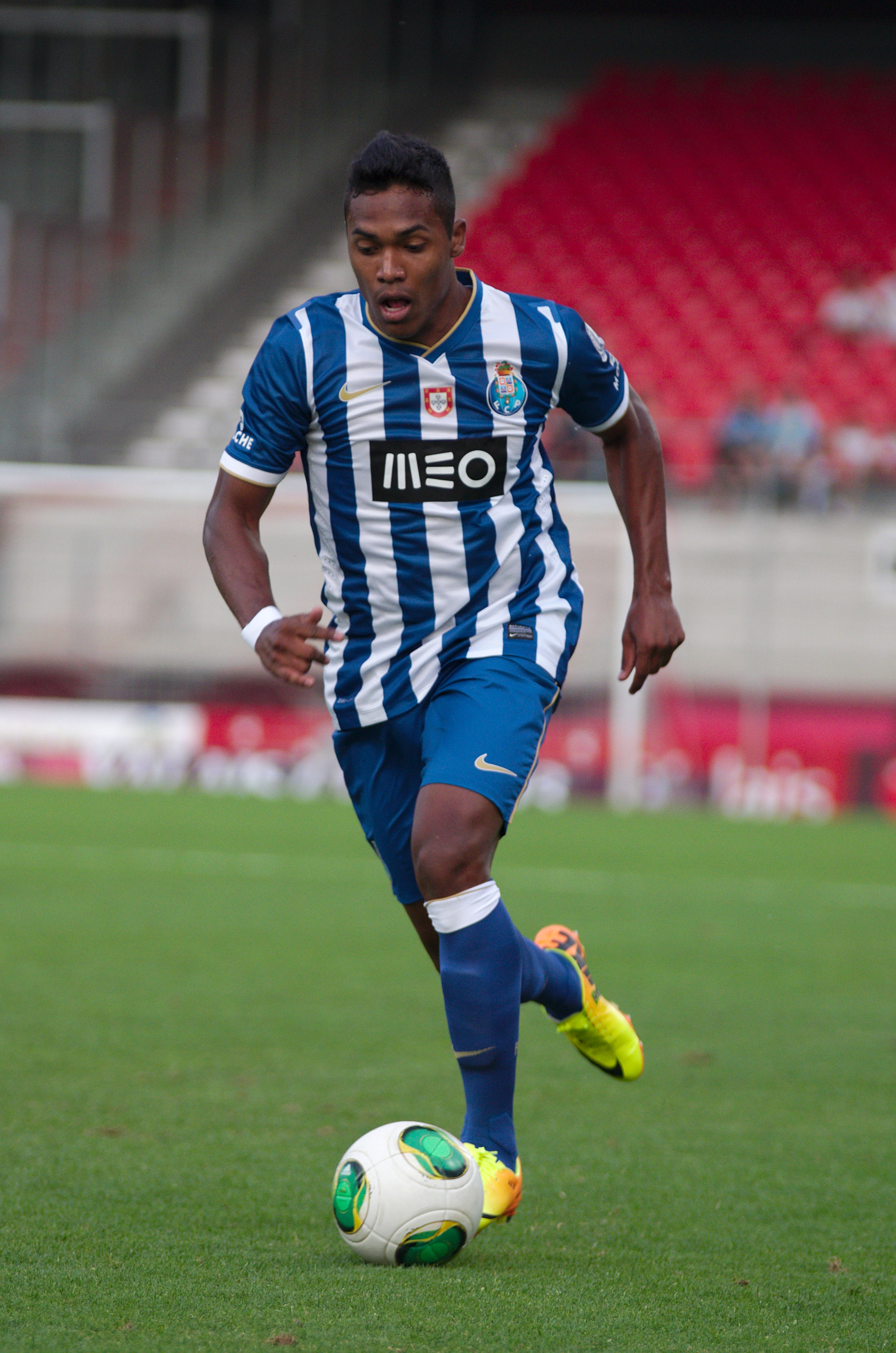
Alex Sandro playing for Porto in 2013

Alex Sandro is a quick, energetic and offensive minded defender, who is also a strong tackler and a good reader of the game, courtesy of his speed and anticipation. He is capable of playing anywhere along the left flank; although mainly a full-back, he has also been used as a wing-back and as a wide midfielder. He has also occasionally been deployed in a more advanced position, as an outside forward or offensive winger, and even as a left-sided centre-back in a three–man back-line. He has been described as a player who is a "powerful runner, can beat opponents one-on-one and is an excellent crosser of the ball". His playing position, athleticism, and playing style have drawn comparisons with compatriot and 2002 FIFA World Cup-winner Roberto Carlos.

== Career statistics ==
=== Club ===
As of match played 22 July 2026

Appearances and goals by club, season and competition
Club	Season	League			State league (Note: Includes Campeonato Paranaense, Campeonato Paulista, Campeonato Carioca)		National cup (Note: Includes Copa do Brasil, Taça de Portugal, Coppa Italia)		League cup (Note: Includes Taça da Liga)		Continental		Other		Total	
Club	Season	Division	Apps	Goals	Apps	Goals	Apps	Goals	Apps	Goals	Apps	Goals	Apps	Goals	Apps	Goals
Atlético Paranaense	2008	Série A	1	0	0	0	0	0	—		—		—		1	0
Atlético Paranaense	2009	Série A	16	0	8	1	0	0	—		—		—		24	1
Atlético Paranaense	Total		17	0	8	1	0	0	—		—		—		25	1
Santos (loan)	2010	Série A	24	1	1	1	4	1	—		—		—		29	3
Santos (loan)	2011	Série A	6	0	7	0	—		—		11 (Note: All appearances in Copa Libertadores)	0	—		24	0
Santos (loan)	Total		30	1	8	1	4	1	—		11	0	—		53	3
Porto	2011–12	Primeira Liga	7	1	—		1	0	3	0	1 (Note: All appearances in UEFA Europa League)	0	0	0	12	1
Porto	2012–13	Primeira Liga	25	1	—		0	0	5	0	6 (Note: All appearances in UEFA Champions League)	0	0	0	36	1
Porto	2013–14	Primeira Liga	26	0	—		6	0	4	0	11 (Note: Six appearances in UEFA Champions League, five appearances in UEFA Europa League)	0	1 (Note: Appearance in Supertaça Cândido de Oliveira)	0	48	0
Porto	2014–15	Primeira Liga	28	1	—		0	0	1	0	11	0	—		40	1
Porto	2015–16	Primeira Liga	1	0	—		—		—		—		—		1	0
Porto	Total		87	3	—		7	0	13	0	29	0	1	0	137	3
Juventus	2015–16	Serie A	22	2	—		5	0	—		5	0	—		32	2
Juventus	2016–17	Serie A	27	3	—		4	0	—		11	0	1 (Note: Appearance in Supercoppa Italiana)	0	43	3
Juventus	2017–18	Serie A	26	4	—		2	0	—		10	0	1	0	39	4
Juventus	2018–19	Serie A	31	1	—		2	0	—		9	0	1	0	43	1
Juventus	2019–20	Serie A	29	1	—		5	0	—		6	0	1	0	41	1
Juventus	2020–21	Serie A	26	2	—		3	0	—		5	0	0	0	34	2
Juventus	2021–22	Serie A	28	0	—		4	1	—		7	1	1	0	40	2
Juventus	2022–23	Serie A	25	0	—		3	0	—		9 (Note: Four appearances in UEFA Champions League, five appearances in UEFA Europa League)	0	—		37	0
Juventus	2023–24	Serie A	16	1	—		2	0	—		—		—		18	1
Juventus	Total		230	14	—		30	1	—		62	1	5	0	327	16
Flamengo	2024	Série A	8	0	—		4	1	—		2	0	—		14	1
Flamengo	2025	Série A	20	0	5	0	0	0	—		10	0	6 (Note: One appearance in Supercopa do Brasil, two appearances in FIFA Club World Cup, three appearances in FIFA Intercontinental Cup)	0	41	0
Flamengo	2026	Série A	14	0	4	0	2	0	—		2	0	2 (Note: One appearance in Supercopa do Brasil, one appearance in Recopa Sudamericana)	0	24	0
Flamengo	Total		42	0	9	0	6	1	—		14	0	8	0	79	1
Career total			406	18	25	2	47	3	13	0	116	1	14	0	621	24

=== International ===
As of match played 24 June 2026

Appearances and goals by national team and year
National team	Year	Apps	Goals
Brazil	2011	2	0
Brazil	2012	4	0
Brazil	2013	0	0
Brazil	2014	0	0
Brazil	2015	0	0
Brazil	2016	0	0
Brazil	2017	4	0
Brazil	2018	3	1
Brazil	2019	10	0
Brazil	2020	0	0
Brazil	2021	12	1
Brazil	2022	5	0
Brazil	2023	0	0
Brazil	2024	0	0
Brazil	2025	3	0
Brazil	2026	3	0
Total		46	2

Scores and results list Brazil's goal tally first, score column indicates score after each Alex Sandro goal.

International goals by date, venue, cap, opponent, score, result and competition
No.	Date	Venue	Cap	Opponent	Score	Result	Competition
1.	12 October 2018	King Saud University Stadium, Riyadh, Saudi Arabia	12	Saudi Arabia	2–0	2–0	2018 Superclásico Championship
2.	17 June 2021	Estádio Olímpico Nilton Santos, Rio de Janeiro, Brazil	27	Peru	1–0	4–0	2021 Copa América

== Honours ==
Santos

- Copa do Brasil: 2010
- Copa Libertadores: 2011
- Campeonato Paulista: 2010, 2011

Porto

- Primeira Liga: 2011–12, 2012–13
- Supertaça Cândido de Oliveira: 2013

Juventus

- Serie A: 2015–16, 2016–17, 2017–18, 2018–19, 2019–20
- Coppa Italia: 2015–16, 2016–17, 2017–18, 2020–21, 2023–24;
- Supercoppa Italiana: 2018
- UEFA Champions League runner-up: 2016–17

Flamengo

- FIFA Challenger Cup: 2025
- FIFA Derby of the Americas: 2025
- Copa Libertadores: 2025
- Campeonato Brasileiro Série A: 2025
- Copa do Brasil: 2024
- Supercopa do Brasil: 2025
- Campeonato Carioca: 2025, 2026

Brazil U20

- FIFA U-20 World Cup: 2011
- South American U-20 Championship: 2011

Brazil U23

- Olympic Silver Medal: 2012

Brazil

- Copa América: 2019

Individual

- O Jogo Team of the Year: 2012, 2013
- Serie A Team of the Year: 2016–17, 2017–18
- FIFA FIFPro World11 nominee 2019 (20th defender)
