= Bryan Chahuaylla =

Peruvian footballer (born 2000)

Personal information
- Full name: Bryan Christopher Chahuaylla Ccorimanya
- Date of birth: 28 October 2000 (age 26)
- Place of birth: Cusco, Peru
- Height: 1.67 m (5 ft 6 in)
- Position: Midfielder

Youth career
- –2015: Cienciano
- Real Garcilaso

Senior career*
Years	Team	Apps	(Gls)
2019–2020	Cusco	4	(0)
- * Club domestic league appearances and goals as of 09:41, 22 December 2020 (UTC)

Bryan Christopher Chahuaylla Ccorimanya (born 28 October 2000) is a Peruvian footballer who plays as a midfielder.

== Club career ==
=== Real Garcilaso / Cusco ===
Chahuaylla played for Cienciano as a youth player and later joined Real Garcilaso. He got his official debut for the club at the age of 18 on 18 May 2019 against Ayacucho FC in the Peruvian Primera División. Chahuaylla played from the first minute, before he was replaced by Reimond Manco after 71 minutes.

Real Garcilaso changed name to Cusco FC for the 2020 season, the season, where Chahuaylla also was promoted permanently to the first team squad. He left the club at the end of 2020, as he wasn't a part of the first team squad for 2021.
