= Isaac Donkor =

Isaac Donkor may refer to:

- Isaac Donkor (footballer, born 1991), Ghanaian footballer
- Isaac Donkor (footballer, born 1995), Ghanaian footballer
