= Leandro Nicolas Diaz =

Leandro Nicolas Diaz may refer to:

- Leandro Díaz (footballer, born 1990), Uruguayan footballer
- Leandro Díaz (footballer, born 1992), Argentine footballer
