= Donkor =

Donkor is an Ashanti surname. Notable people with the Ashanti surname include:

- Aaron Donkor (born 1995), German American football player
- Akua Donkor (1952–2024), Ghanaian farmer and politician
- Godfried Donkor (born 1964), Ghanaian artist
- Isaac Donkor (born 1991), Ghanaian footballer
- Isaac Donkor (born 1995), Ghanaian footballer
- Kimathi Donkor (born 1965), British artist
- Menaye Donkor (born 1981), Canadian businesswoman and philanthropist
