= 2007 South American U-17 Championship =

2007 South American Under-17 Football Championship
2007 Sudamericano Sub-17

Tournament details
- Host country: Ecuador
- Dates: 4–26 March
- Teams: 10 (from 1 confederation)
- Venue: 7 (in 7 host cities)

Final positions
- Champions: Brazil (8th title)
- Runners-up: Colombia
- Third place: Argentina
- Fourth place: Peru

Tournament statistics
- Matches played: 35
- Goals scored: 108 (3.09 per match)
- Top scorer: (Brazil) Lulinha (12 goals)
- Best player: (Peru) Reimond Manco

The 2007 South American Under-17 Football Championship was played in Ecuador from 4 to 25 March 2007. The seven venues of the competition were the cities of Ambato, Azogues, Cuenca, Ibarra, Latacunga, Quito and Riobamba. The tournament provided four berths to the 2007 FIFA U-17 World Cup and six to the 2007 Pan American Games.

== First round ==
The ten national teams were divided in two groups of five teams each. The top three teams in each group qualified for the final round and for the 2007 Pan American Games.

=== Group A ===
| Team | Pts | Pld | W | D | L | GF | GA |
|---|---|---|---|---|---|---|---|
| Peru | 7 | 4 | 2 | 1 | 1 | 7 | 5 |
| Ecuador | 7 | 4 | 2 | 1 | 1 | 6 | 5 |
| Brazil | 6 | 4 | 2 | 0 | 2 | 14 | 9 |
| Bolivia | 6 | 4 | 2 | 0 | 2 | 5 | 11 |
| Chile | 3 | 4 | 1 | 0 | 3 | 3 | 5 |

4 March 2007
| Ecuador | 0 : 1 | Bolivia | Riobamba |
| Brazil | 1 : 2 | Peru | Riobamba |
6 March 2007
| Bolivia | 1 : 4 | Peru | Riobamba |
| Ecuador | 1 : 0 | Chile | Riobamba |
8 March 2007
| Bolivia | 2 : 7 | Brazil | Ambato |
| Peru | 1 : 3 | Chile | Ambato |
10 March 2007
| Ecuador | 0 : 0 | Peru | Ambato |
| Brazil | 2 : 0 | Chile | Ambato |
12 March 2007
| Brazil | 4 : 5 | Ecuador | Latacunga |
| Chile | 0 : 1 | Bolivia | Latacunga |

=== Group B ===
| Team | Pts | Pld | W | D | L | GF | GA |
|---|---|---|---|---|---|---|---|
| Argentina | 8 | 4 | 2 | 2 | 0 | 7 | 2 |
| Colombia | 8 | 4 | 2 | 2 | 0 | 5 | 2 |
| Venezuela | 5 | 4 | 1 | 2 | 1 | 6 | 8 |
| Uruguay | 4 | 4 | 1 | 1 | 2 | 7 | 6 |
| Paraguay | 1 | 4 | 0 | 1 | 3 | 3 | 10 |

5 March 2007
| Argentina | 4 : 0 | Paraguay | Azogues |
| Uruguay | 4 : 1 | Venezuela | Azogues |
7 March 2007
| Argentina | 0 : 0 | Colombia | Cuenca |
| Uruguay | 2 : 2 | Paraguay | Cuenca |
9 March 2007
| Uruguay | 0 : 1 | Colombia | Cuenca |
| Venezuela | 2 : 1 | Paraguay | Cuenca |
11 March 2007
| Argentina | 1 : 1 | Venezuela | Azogues |
| Colombia | 2 : 0 | Paraguay | Azogues |
13 March 2007
| Argentina | 2 : 1 | Uruguay | Cuenca |
| Colombia | 2 : 2 | Venezuela | Cuenca |

== Final round ==
The final round was played in a round robin system, with the top four teams qualifying for the 2007 U-17 World Cup.

| Team | Pts | Pld | W | D | L | GF | GA |
|---|---|---|---|---|---|---|---|
| Brazil | 13 | 5 | 4 | 1 | 0 | 15 | 2 |
| Colombia | 10 | 5 | 3 | 1 | 1 | 11 | 4 |
| Argentina | 8 | 5 | 2 | 2 | 1 | 6 | 5 |
| Peru | 5 | 5 | 1 | 2 | 2 | 6 | 11 |
| Venezuela | 4 | 5 | 1 | 1 | 3 | 3 | 12 |
| Ecuador | 1 | 5 | 0 | 1 | 4 | 5 | 12 |

16 March 2007
| Ecuador | 1 : 2 | Colombia | Ibarra |
| Argentina | 0 : 2 | Brazil | Ibarra |
| Peru | 2 : 1 | Venezuela | Ibarra |
18 March 2007
| Ecuador | 0 : 1 | Venezuela | Ibarra |
| Argentina | 2 : 1 | Colombia | Ibarra |
| Peru | 0 : 4 | Brazil | Ibarra |
20 March 2007
| Brazil | 4 : 0 | Venezuela | Ibarra |
| Argentina | 2 : 0 | Ecuador | Ibarra |
| Peru | 1 : 3 | Colombia | Ibarra |
23 March 2007
| Colombia | 0 : 0 | Brazil | Latacunga |
| Argentina | 1 : 1 | Venezuela | Latacunga |
| Peru | 2 : 2 | Ecuador | Latacunga |
25 March 2007
| Colombia | 5 : 0 | Venezuela | Quito |
| Brazil | 5 : 2 | Ecuador | Quito |
| Peru | 1 : 1 | Argentina | Quito |

2007 South American Under-17 Football champions

Brazil
8th title

== Topscorers ==
12 goals

- (Brazil) Lulinha

7 goals

- (Brazil) Fabio

6 goals

- (Colombia) Cristian Nazarith

3 goals

- (Argentina) Nicolás Mazzola
- (Argentina) Eduardo Salvio
- (Colombia) James Rodríguez
- (Ecuador) Ángel Marín
- (Peru) Christian La Torre
- (Peru) Reimond Manco
- (Uruguay) Santiago Silva
- (Venezuela) Yonatan Del Valle

2 goals

- (Argentina) Santiago Fernández
- (Bolivia) Diego Suárez
- (Brazil) Alex Teixeira
- (Brazil) Bernardo
- (Brazil) Fellipe Bastos
- (Brazil) Maicon
- (Chile) Danilo Bustos
- (Colombia) Ricardo Serna

2 goals (cont.)

- (Colombia) Santiago Tréllez
- (Ecuador) Miller Bolaños
- (Ecuador) Pablo Ochoa
- (Ecuador) Erick Minda
- (Peru) Jairo Hernández
- (Uruguay) Jonathan Urretavizcaya
- (Venezuela) Gustavo Páez

== Qualified for 2007 U-17 World Cup ==
- Brazil
- Colombia
- Argentina
- Peru

== Qualified for 2007 Pan American Games ==
- Brazil
- Argentina
- Ecuador
- Colombia
- Peru (declined, replaced by Bolivia)
- Venezuela
