= Jordi Pablo =

Spanish footballer

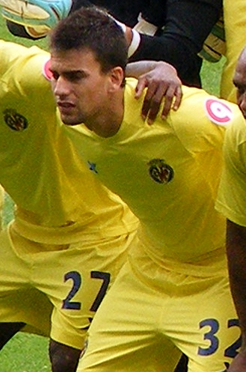
- Pablo lining up for Villarreal in 2011

Personal information
- Full name: Jordi Pablo Ripollés
- Date of birth: 1 January 1990 (age 36)
- Place of birth: Vinaròs, Spain
- Height: 1.73 m (5 ft 8 in)
- Position: Midfielder

Team information
- Current team: La Roda (assistant)

Youth career
- Vinaròs
- 1998–2006: Villarreal

Senior career*
Years	Team	Apps	(Gls)
2006–2009	Villarreal B	45	(1)
2007–2008	Villarreal C	12	(1)
2009	Villarreal	2	(0)
2009–2011	Málaga	0	(0)
2010–2011	→ Cartagena (loan)	0	(0)
2011–2012	Villarreal B	3	(0)
2012	Atlético Madrid B	0	(0)
2012–2014	La Roda	68	(6)
2014–2015	Mirandés	32	(0)
2015–2016	Socuéllamos	11	(0)
2016	La Roda	2	(0)
Total		175	(8)

International career
2005–2006	Spain U15	2	(0)
2005	Spain U16	1	(0)
2006–2007	Spain U17	10	(4)
2008–2009	Spain U19	13	(2)

Managerial career
- 2016–: La Roda (assistant)
- * Club domestic league appearances and goals

Jordi Pablo Ripollés (born 1 January 1990) is a Spanish former footballer who played as a right midfielder, and the current assistant manager of La Roda CF.

Having started out at Villarreal and excelling for Spain at youth level, his senior career was blighted by injuries.

== Club career ==
Born in Vinaròs, Province of Castellón, Jordi Pablo began his career with local Vinaròs CF, joining Villarreal CF's youth system at the age of 8. He made his debut for the first team of the latter in April 2009, appearing in two consecutive defeats: 0–2 at home against Málaga CF for La Liga and 0–3 at Arsenal in the UEFA Champions League– this was due to the injury of Santi Cazorla, lost for the season also in that month.

In late July 2009, Jordi Pablo joined Málaga on a four-year deal, with Villarreal retaining a rebuying option in the first three. Late into preseason he suffered a severe knee injury against Levante UD, going on to miss the entire 2009–10.

On 17 August 2010, Jordi Pablo was loaned to FC Cartagena in the second division. However, in the Murcian team's first pre-season match, he injured his right leg, being sidelined for the first months of the new campaign and again failing to play in any competitive games.

On 1 August 2011, Málaga cancelled Jordi Pablo's contract. He immediately returned to Villarreal's reserves, in the second level; on 22 October 2011 he made his first appearance since 26 April 2009, playing the last 29 minutes against Real Murcia in a 1–3 away defeat.

Jordi Pablo all but competed in division three in the following years, his only season in the second tier being spent with CD Mirandés in 2014–15 as that club was reinstated following Murcia's relegation due to financial irregularities. In August 2016, following a thigh injury while playing for La Roda CF, the 26-year-old retired from football but, as he still was under contract, was immediately named their assistant coach.

== International career ==
Jordi Pablo played for Spain's under-17 at the 2007 FIFA World Cup held in South Korea, helping the nation to a final runner-up spot after a penalty shootout loss to Nigeria. After his performances (three goals, four matches), he was promoted to the under-19s.
