= Gustavo Páez =

Venezuelan footballer (born 1990)

Personal information
- Full name: Gustavo Andrés Páez Martinez
- Date of birth: April 16, 1990 (age 36)
- Place of birth: Mérida, Mérida, Venezuela
- Height: 1.77 m (5 ft 9 1/2 in)
- Positions: Forward; right wing

Team information
- Current team: Estudiantes de Mérida

Youth career
- 1994–2006: Academia Emeritense

Senior career*
Years	Team	Apps	(Gls)
2006–2008	Academia Emeritense		
2009	Alianza Lima		
2009	Zamora		
2010	Interblock Ljubljana	19	(5)
2010	Union Quinto		
2011–2013	Mallorca B	44	(3)
2013	ACD Lara	12	(0)
2013–2014	Deportivo La Guaira	10	(0)
2014	Messina	9	(0)
2014–2015	Zamora	17	(2)
2016	Estudiantes de Mérida	32	(9)
2017–2019	Kaizer Chiefs	45	(7)
2019	Atlético Venezuela	9	(0)
2020	Mineros de Guayana	4	(1)
2021	Yaracuyanos	2	(1)
2022	Aragua	5	(0)
2025-	Estudiantes de Merida	6	(0)

International career
2007	Venezuela U-17		
- * Club domestic league appearances and goals as of 17:28, 8 July 2020 (UTC)

Gustavo Andrés Páez Martinez (born April 16, 1990) is a Venezuelan footballer who plays for Estudiantes de Mérida as a forward.

== Career ==
Born in Mérida, Páez started his senior career playing in lowly club Academia Emeritense. In 2009, he had a short spell with Peruvian Alianza Lima before returning to his home country to play with Zamora FC, in Venezuelan Primera División.

In January 2010 Páez signed with NK Interblock Ljubljana playing in the Slovenian First League; despite being regular at the side, he suffered team relegation at the end of the season. In September 2010 he went to Italy to play for Serie D side A.S. Union Quinto.

In August 2011 Páez moved to Spain, signing with RCD Mallorca and being assigned to the reserves in Segunda División B. After appearing with the Balearics for two seasons, he joined ACD Lara.

On 31 January 2017, it was announced that Paez will sign for South African club Kaizer Chiefs F.C.

== National team ==
Gustavo Páez was part of the Venezuela national U17 team at the 2007 South American Under 17 Football Championship.

== External sources ==
- Stats from Slovenia at PrvaLiga.
- Gustavo Páez at Soccerway
