= Nour Hadhria =

Tunisian footballer

Personal information
- Date of birth: 4 September 1990 (age 36)
- Place of birth: Ariana, Tunisia
- Height: 1.87 m (6 ft 2 in)
- Position: Midfielder

Youth career
- Club Africain

Senior career*
Years	Team	Apps	(Gls)
2008–2012	Club Africain		
2011–2012	→ CA Bizertin (loan)		
2012–2015	CA Bizertin		
2015–2016	AS Marsa		
2017–2018	CA Bizertin		
2018–2019	Jendouba Sport		
2020	Menzel Bouzelfa		
- * Club domestic league appearances and goals

Nour Hadhria (born 4 September 1990) is a retired Tunisian football midfielder. He was a squad member at the 2007 FIFA U-17 World Cup.
