= Yakubu Alfa =

Nigerian footballer (born 1990)

Personal information
- Full name: Yakubu Alfa
- Date of birth: 31 December 1990 (age 35)
- Place of birth: Minna, Nigeria
- Height: 1.75 m (5 ft 9 in)
- Position: Central midfielder

Team information
- Current team: Niger Tornadoes
- Number: 10

Senior career*
| Years | Team | Apps | (Gls) |
| 2007–2008 | Niger Tornadoes | 35 | (8) |
| 2009 | Helsingborgs IF | 2 | (0) |
| 2010 | Skoda Xanthi | 0 | (0) |
| 2011–2012 | AEK Larnaca | 10 | (0) |
| 2013– | AS Trenčín | 0 | (0) |
| 2014 – 2015 | Niger Tornadoes | 29 | (6) |
| 2015 – 2017 | Niger Tornadoes | 30 | (11) |

International career^{‡}
| 2007 | Nigeria U-17 | 6 | (2) |
| 2009 | Nigeria U-20 | 6 | (1) |
- * Club domestic league appearances and goals as of 2 March 2013 ‡ National team caps and goals as of 2 March 2013

Yakubu Alfa(born 31 December 1990 in Minna) is a Nigerian football player who plays for Niger Tornadoes F.C. He plays as a central midfielder with scoring and assisting ability.

== Career ==
Alfa moved on 8 January 2009 from Niger Tornadoes F.C. to Helsingborgs IF. After one year in which he earned two professional caps for his Swedish club Helsingborgs IF, his contract was sold by Skoda Xanthi on 31 January 2010. He had been linked in October 2009 with a move to Germinal Beerschot. In May 2011 he signed with AEK Larnaca. In March 2013, he moved to AS Trenčín.

== International career ==
He represented his homeland at the 2007 FIFA U-17 World Cup in the Korea Republic, he won also with the Nigeria U-17 *Golden Eagles* the World Cup 2007. He won the goal of the tournament after curling the ball at top left-hand corner of the Colombia goalkeeper, his goal was rated by FIFA users as 4.4 out of 5 making him with one point ahead of Japan's Yoichiro Kakitani and was the Round of 16 match against Colombia at the FIFA U-17 World Cup Korea 2007. On 15 December 2008 was called for the Nigerian under-20 national team for the African Cup of Nations U-20 2009 in Rwanda, scored a goal against Egypt. On 3 March 2010 earned his first call-up for the Super Eagles.

== Titles ==
- 2007 FIFA U-17 World Cup
