= Alonso Bazalar =

Peruvian football midfielder (born 1990)

Personal information
- Full name: Carlos Alonso Bazalar Arostegui
- Date of birth: March 19, 1990 (age 36)
- Place of birth: Cusco, Peru
- Height: 1.78 m (5 ft 10 in)
- Position: Midfielder

Team information
- Current team: Cienciano
- Number: 29

Senior career*
Years	Team	Apps	(Gls)
2007–	Cienciano	24	(0)

International career
2007–2008	Peru U-17	19	(0)
2009–2010	Peru U-20	13	(1)
2010–	Peru	3	(0)
- * Club domestic league appearances and goals as of June 10, 2008

Carlos Alonso Bazalar Arostegui (born March 19, 1990, in Lima) is a Peruvian football midfielder. He currently plays for Cienciano.

== International career ==
Bazalar represented Peru at the 2007 FIFA U-17 World Cup in the Republic of Korea, where the Peruvian side reached the quarter finals. He also represented Peru at the 2007 South American Under-17 Football Championship in Ecuador and at the 2009 South American Youth Championship in Venezuela.

== Personal life ==
Alonso is the son of the Peruvian former footballer Juan Carlos Bazalar.
