= Sadick Adams =

Ghanaian footballer (born 1990)

Personal information
- Full name: Sadick Adams
- Date of birth: 1 January 1990 (age 36)
- Place of birth: Tamale, Northern Region, Ghana
- Height: 1.73 m (5 ft 8 in)
- Position: Forward

Youth career
- Ashanti Gold

Senior career*
Years	Team	Apps	(Gls)
2007	Ashanti Gold	19	(9)
2008–2009	Atlético Madrid B	22	(9)
2009–2010	Vojvodina	3	(0)
2010	Étoile du Sahel	15	(7)
2011	Hammam-Sousse		
2011–2012	Al-Ansar	6	(0)
2012–2013	Berekum Chelsea	1	(0)
2013	Saham Club		
2014	Al-Nahda	10	(3)
2014–2015	Al-Feiha	22	(9)
2015–2016	Berekum Chelsea	19	(8)
2016	Türk Ocağı	30	(2)
2017	Berekum Chelsea		
2017–2019	Asante Kotoko	9	(14)
2019–2020	Shabab Bourj	3	(1)
2020–2021	Arambagh KS	6	(0)

International career
2007	Ghana U17	10	(9)
2007	Ghana U20	3	(1)
2008	Ghana U23	3	(2)
2017	Ghana	2	(1)
- * Club domestic league appearances and goals as of 1 July 2021

Sadick Adams (born 1 January 1990) is a Ghanaian former professional footballer who played as a striker. He last played for Bangladesh Premier League club Arambagh KS. Adams was considered by World Soccer magazine one of the 50 Most Exciting Teenagers on the Planet in their November 2007 issue.

== Club career ==
=== Atlético Madrid ===
Atlético Madrid signed a pre-contract with Adams in November 2007, and allowed him to train with the reserve, as FIFA stated that no international transfer is allowed for player under-18.

=== FK Vojvodina ===
On 3 December 2009, it was announced that Adams would join Vojvodina. He was officially signed on 6 December 2009, on a four-and-a-half-year contract. He played half a season with the Serbian SuperLiga club, having played only 9 league matches.

=== Étoile Sportive du Sahel ===
On 16 May 2010, Adams returned to Africa and he signed a three-year contract with Tunisian Ligue Professionnelle 1 club Étoile Sportive du Sahel.

=== Al-Ansar ===
In January 2012, Adams signed with Saudi Professional League club Al-Ansar for the 2011–12 Saudi Professional League.

=== Berekum Chelsea ===
In October 2012, Adams signed a contract with Glo Premier League club Berekum Chelsea for the 2012–13 season. On 24 October 2012, Adams made his debut for Berekum Chelsea in a 1–0 defeat to Medeama SC.

=== Saham ===
In the summer of 2013, Sadick Adams joined Saham of Oman.

He then played with Turkish Cypriot club Türk Ocağı.

=== Asante Kotoko ===
Sadick Adams was signed by Asante Kotoko and was handed number 99. He scored a lot of match winning goals in his first season. Mostly through penalty kicks. But what most Kumasi Asante Kotoko fans will remember him for is his first half hat trick against rivals Accra Hearts of Oak (during the 2017 MTN FA cup in Tamale which Asante Kotoko won by 3 goals to 1).

== International career ==
=== 2007 U-17 World Cup ===
He scored 4 goals in 2007 FIFA U-17 World Cup for the Ghana U17 team, including a goal in their 1–2 semi-final loss to Spain.

=== Ghana national under-23 team ===
During 2011, he was part of the Ghana national under-23 football team in the 2011 CAF U-23 Championship which was a qualifying tournament for the 2012 London Olympics.

=== Ghana national team ===
Adams debuted for the Ghanaian main national team in 2017.

=== International goals ===
Scores and results list Ghana's goal tally first.

No.	Date	Venue	Opponent	Score	Result	Competition
1.	12 August 2017	Stade du 4 Août, Ouagadougou, Burkina Faso	Burkina Faso	1–0	2–2	2018 African Nations Championship qualification
