= Diego Suárez (footballer, born 1992) =

Bolivian footballer

Personal information
- Full name: Diego Orlando Suárez Saucedo
- Date of birth: October 7, 1992 (age 34)
- Place of birth: Santa Ana del Yacuma, Bolivia
- Height: 1.78 m (5 ft 10 in)
- Position: Midfielder

Team information
- Current team: San José

Senior career*
Years	Team	Apps	(Gls)
2006–2007	Blooming	3	(0)
2007–2016	Dynamo-2 Kyiv	137	(14)
2014	→ Blooming (loan)		
2016–2018	Oriente Petrolero	54	(1)
2019–	San José	3	(0)

International career
2009	Bolivia U17	2	(0)
2009	Bolivia U20	3	(0)
- * Club domestic league appearances and goals as of 3 March 2019

Diego Orlando Suárez Saucedo (born 7 October 1992, in Santa Ana del Yacuma, Beni) is a Bolivian professional football player who currently plays for Club San José.

== Career ==
Although Suárez did not play for Blooming in the Liga de Fútbol Profesional Boliviano, he made his debut for the club in the Copa Libertadores on 1 February 2007, coming off the bench against Brazilian side Santos, becoming, at the age of 14 years and 4 months, the youngest-ever player in the history of the Copa Libertadores, a record that he still holds.

In late March 2007, the Bolivian media claimed that Diego was about to be given a trial by the famous English football club, Chelsea. These rumors were soon quashed as Chelsea never contacted him to give him a trial. The young Bolivian did make his way to Europe and in late November was signed by Ukrainian club Dynamo Kyiv.

Suárez signed with Club San José for the 2019 season.

== International career ==
During January 2009, Suárez played in the South American Youth Championship for the Bolivian U-20 team, later in the year, he joined the Bolivian U-17 squad in Chile for the FIFA U-17 World Cup qualifiers.
