= Kelvin Bossman =

Ghanaian footballer

Personal information
- Full name: Kelvin Owusu Bossman
- Date of birth: 20 January 1991 (age 35)
- Place of birth: Ghana
- Height: 6 ft 0 in (1.83 m)
- Position: Forward

Team information
- Current team: Marlow
- Number: 19

Youth career
- 2002–2009: Reading

Senior career*
Years	Team	Apps	(Gls)
2008–2009	→ Basingstoke Town (loan)	7	(1)
2009	→ Woking (loan)	8	(0)
2009–2011	FC Groningen	0	(0)
2011	→ SC Cambuur (loan)	5	(0)
2011–2012	Helmond Sport	19	(2)
2012–2013	Maidenhead United	2	(0)
2013	Havant & Waterlooville	8	(1)
2013	Hayes & Yeading United	7	(2)
2013–2014	Cambridge City	29	(7)
2014–2016	Biggleswade Town	37	(25)
2016–2017	Enfield Town		
2017–	Marlow	65	(14)

International career
2007	Ghana U17	5	(1)
- * Club domestic league appearances and goals as of 15:03, 9 March 2020 (UTC)

Kelvin Owusu Bossman (born 20 January 1991) is a Ghanaian footballer who plays as a forward for Marlow.

== Club career ==
Born in Ghana, Bossman moved to the United Kingdom aged 9. He joined the Reading Academy in 2002 and progressed through the age groups, signing scholarship forms in 2007. In December 2008 he joined Basingstoke Town on work experience. He made his debut against Eastleigh and made eight appearances in total, scoring once, before returning to Reading in February. Soon after he joined Conference Premier side Woking on a similar deal until the end of the season, making a further eight appearances. Despite top scoring for the academy with seven goals from 14 games during 2008–09, he left Reading at the end of the season having not been offered a professional contract.

He signed for Eredivisie side FC Groningen in 2009 after a two-week trial and played in the reserve team. He suffered a serious knee injury during his time with the club and failed to make an appearance for the first-team, joining Eerste Divisie side SC Cambuur on loan in March 2011. After leaving Groningen he joined Helmond Sport and spent one season with the club, making 20 appearances in all competitions. He left the club in 2012 having not been offered a new contract after breaking his metatarsal.

In October 2012, Bossman returned to England with Conference South side Maidenhead United. After making just two appearances in four months, he moved to divisional rivals Havant & Waterlooville on a short-term contract. He made eight appearances, seven coming as a substitute, but left the club in May 2013 having declined the offer of a new contract. In August 2013 he joined Southern League Premier Division side Cambridge City on non-contract terms. He remained with the club for just two weeks before returning to the Conference South with Hayes & Yeading United. He made his debut in a 1–0 win over Dover Athletic.

After less than three months with Hayes & Yeading, Bossman returned to Cambridge City in November on a game-by-game basis, citing "personal reasons" for the move.

On 18 February 2020, Bossman made his 100th appearance for Marlow.

== International career ==
Bossman represented Ghana at the under-17 World Cup, making five appearances and scoring once against Trinidad and Tobago.

== Career statistics ==
As of match played 30 April 2014.

Club	Season	League			FA Cup		League Cup		Other		Total	
Club	Season	Division	Apps	Goals	Apps	Goals	Apps	Goals	Apps	Goals	Apps	Goals
Basingstoke Town (loan)	2008–09	Conference South	7	1	0	0	—		1 (Note: Appearance in the FA Trophy)	0	8	1
Woking (loan)	2008–09	Conference Premier	8	0	0	0	—		0	0	8	0
FC Groningen	2009–10	Eredivisie	0	0	0	0	—		—		0	0
SC Cambuur (loan)	2010–11	Eerste Divisie	5	0	0	0	—		—		5	0
Helmond Sport	2011–12	Eerste Divisie	19	2	1	0	—		—		20	2
Maidenhead United	2012–13	Conference South	2	0	0	0	—		0	0	2	0
Havant & Waterlooville	2012–13	Conference South	8	1	0	0	—		0	0	8	1
Cambridge City	2013–14	Southern League	4	0	0	0	—		0	0	4	0
Hayes & Yeading United	2013–14	Conference South	7	2	2	0	—		0	0	9	2
Cambridge City	2013–14	Southern League	24	7	0	0	—		1 (Note: Appearance in the Cambridgeshire Invitational Cup)	0	25	7
Career total			84	13	3	0	—		2	0	89	13

== Personal life ==
Bossman's brother Allen is also a footballer who as of the 2013–14 season plays for Cheshunt.
