= César Ruiz (footballer) =

Peruvian footballer (born 1990)

Personal information
- Full name: César Augusto Ruiz Sánchez
- Date of birth: 10 January 1990 (age 36)
- Place of birth: Pueblo Libre, Peru
- Height: 1.78 m (5 ft 10 in)
- Position: Midfielder

Team information
- Current team: Deportivo Llacuabamba
- Number: 28

Youth career
- Sporting Cristal

Senior career*
Years	Team	Apps	(Gls)
2007–2010	Sporting Cristal		
2009–2010	→ Coronel Bolognesi (loan)	10	(0)
2011	Hijos de Acosvinchos	20	(1)
2012	Sport Boys	38	(3)
2013	León de Huánuco	15	(0)
2014–2016	Sport Huancayo	48	(0)
2018	Unión Comercio	10	(0)
2019	Cultural Santa Rosa	16	(0)
2020–	Deportivo Llacuabamba	9	(1)

International career
2007	Peru U-17	23	(1)
- * Club domestic league appearances and goals as of 11:56, 28 September 2020 (UTC)

César Augusto Ruiz Sánchez (born 10 January 1990 in Lima, Peru) is a Peruvian footballer who most recently played for Deportivo Llacuabamba.

== Profile ==
Coming from the popular district of Puente Piedra, César Ruiz joined Sporting Cristal in 1999. In 2007 César Ruiz, along with 8 other U-20 players, were called up to the first team. For 2009, he was on loan at Coronel Bolognesi.

He was also part of the Peru U-17 team that reached the quarterfinal stage at the 2007 FIFA U-17 World Cup played in South Korea.

After playing Copa Peru with Coronel Bolognesi when they were relegated from the first division, he played for Hijos de Acosvinchos. This year signed a contract with Sport Boys.
