= Darwin Nieves =

Uruguayan footballer (born 1990)

Darwin Daniel Nieves Vagnoni (born June 24, 1990, in Montevideo, Uruguay) is a Uruguayan footballer currently playing for Arturo Fernández Vial of the Segunda División Chilena.

== Teams ==
- (Uruguay) Liverpool 2010–2011
- (Chile) Arturo Fernández Vial 2012–present
