= Anthony Molina (footballer) =

Peruvian footballer (born 1990)

Personal information
- Full name: Anthony Belkier Molina Rubio
- Date of birth: 13 August 1990 (age 36)
- Place of birth: Lima, Peru
- Height: 1.88 m (6 ft 2 in)
- Position: Centre-back

Youth career
- Universidad San Martín

Senior career*
| Years | Team | Apps | (Gls) |
| 2008–2016 | Universidad San Martín | 75 | (1) |
| 2018 | Deportivo Coopsol | 6 | (0) |

International career
| 2007 | Peru U17 | | |
- * Club domestic league appearances and goals

Anthony Belkier Molina Rubio (born 13 August 1990) is a Peruvian former professional footballer who played as a centre-back.

== Club career ==
Anthony Molina began his senior career with CD Universidad San Martín in the 2008 season. He made his league debut in the Torneo Descentralizado on 25 June 2008 at home against Atlético Minero. Manager Víctor Rivera placed him in the starting line-up along with Orlando Contreras. His side eventually won the match 4–0.

== International career ==
Molina featured for Peru U17 side in the 2007 FIFA U-17 World Cup.
