= Reimond Manco =

Peruvian footballer (born 1990)

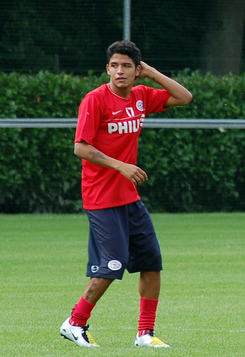

Personal information
- Full name: Reimond Orángel Manco Albarracín
- Date of birth: 23 August 1990 (age 36)
- Place of birth: Lurín - Manchay, Peru
- Height: 1.72 m (5 ft 8 in)
- Positions: Attacking midfielder; winger

Youth career
- 2002–2006: Academia Cantolao
- 2006–2007: Alianza Lima

Senior career*
Years	Team	Apps	(Gls)
2007–2008	Alianza Lima	28	(3)
2008–2010	PSV	2	(0)
2009	→ Willem II (loan)	2	(0)
2010	→ Juan Aurich (loan)	29	(1)
2010–2012	Juan Aurich	11	(3)
2011	→ Atlante (loan)	7	(0)
2012	→ León de Huánuco (loan)	8	(0)
2012	Al-Wakrah	0	(0)
2013–2014	UT Cajamarca	70	(5)
2015	León de Huánuco	10	(1)
2015–2016	Alianza Lima	35	(4)
2017	Zamora	6	(0)
2017–2018	Unión Comercio	69	(7)
2019	Real Garcilaso	11	(0)
2019	Sport Boys	16	(2)
2020	Binacional	8	(0)
2020	Atlético Grau	18	(1)
2021–2022	Alianza Universidad	14	(0)
2022	Santos de Nasca	6	(1)
2022	Juan Aurich	7	(0)
2023	Ecosem Pasco	2	(0)
2024	Unión Comercio	0	(0)

International career
2005	Venezuela U15		
2007	Peru U17	13	(4)
2009	Peru U20	4	(0)
2008–2013	Peru	6	(0)
- * Club domestic league appearances and goals as of 21:36, 9 January 2023 (UTC)

Reimond Orángel Manco Albarracín (born 23 August 1990) is a former Peruvian footballer who last played for Unión Comercio. He used to play in PSV Eindhoven of Netherlands and Al Wakrah of Qatar. He came to prominence in the 2007 South American Under 17 Football Championship, in which he was selected as player of the tournament. He was instrumental in Peru's qualification for the 2007 FIFA U-17 World Cup in South Korea. His first cap for Peru was against Bolivia on 6 February 2008.

== Playing career ==
Reimond Manco was born in the Lurín district of Lima on 23 August 1990. He moved to Venezuela and lived there from age two to eight, and again from age 13 to 15. While in Venezuela, he played for the Venezuela national under 15 team.

In 2005, he was bought by Academia Deportiva Cantolao, in Peru, and played there until 2007, when he began playing for Alianza Lima in his home city of Lima. He made his first appearance for Alianza on 8 April 2007 and his first goal 2 December against Coronel Bolognesi to win the game 3–2.

=== South American Under 17 Football Championship ===
Manco went with the Peruvian U-17 football team to the 2007 South American Under 17 Football Championship that started on 4 March 2007. In the first match the team had to face the Brazil national team. Peru won the match 2–1 with one goal scored by Manco and the other by Christian La Torre and a penalty saved by the young goalkeeper Hermoza.

After that match, Peru won most of the following matches and ended first in its group (qualifying to the last round) with Manco scoring another goal and shining for his team.

In the final round of the tournament (where the first four qualified to the 2007 FIFA U-17 World Cup) Peru won the first match against Venezuela but in the next match Brazil crushed Peru 4–0 and after that Colombia defeated Peru 3–0. By the fourth match Brazil, Colombia and Argentina were already qualified for the U-17 World Cup. Meanwhile, Peru, Venezuela and hosts Ecuador had to fight for the last qualification.

For the fifth match, Peru had the obligation to defeat Ecuador, although the match ended in a draw, a result which took every hope for Ecuador to be present in the U-17 World Cup. For the last match against Argentina, Peru had to lose by at least four goals to be eliminated. In the match beforehand against Ecuador, Manco had been sent off in the last minute for two yellow cards. Even without Manco, the "Incas" were capable of drawing the match through a penalty and managed to get a place in the U-17 World Cup. Manco was chosen as the best player of the tournament by CONMEBOL, South America's official football federation. Despite his fresh footballer career, rumors regarding his transfer were already spreading. After the competition, he was reported to be scouted by big clubs such as Boca Juniors, Real Madrid, and PSV. It was later rumoured he had signed with the latter, though he had not at the time. Liverpool were also reportedly very keen to get the youngster's service.

=== FIFA U-17 World Cup in South Korea ===
Peru started the World Cup against the host nation South Korea. They were very effective against them, attacking and counter-attacking very well winning 1–0 with a goal from Carlos Bazalar in the 29th minute via Manco's free kick. Manco could have scored the 2–0, but was brought down by a Korean defender, for which he was shown the red card, leaving Korea with no chance of coming back into the game.

Peru then tied 0–0 with Togo, in which Manco showed great skill. Against Costa Rica Peru won 1–0, again with a goal from Bazalar via Manco's free kick.

Peru went through to the quarterfinals with 7 points. Manco would shine the most against Tajikistan, where he did pretty much whatever he wanted against the Tajikistan defence on the flanks, and scored Peru's only goal, and his first and only goal in the World Cup. The game ended 1–1, with Peru winning 5–4 in the penalty shootout after Peruvian goalkeeper Hermoza saved the first penalty.

They moved on to the semifinals against Ghana who had defeated Brasil 1–0 in their quarter final match, even more meritorious considering Ghana had only 10 men from the first half against Brasil. Manco was not able to do much in the first half against Ghana, due to personal marking on him. He did better in the second half, creating a few chances for his teammates and eluding his markers, but Peru was ultimately defeated by Ghana 2–0.

Manco was considered one of the best players of the tournament, along with fellow Peruvians Eder Hermoza, Nestor Duarte, Carlos Bazalar, and Bojan Krkić, Toni Kroos, and Macauley Chrisantus.

=== Alianza Lima ===
Reimond Manco made his debut for Alianza Lima on 7 April 2007 in the 2–0 victory over Alianza Atletico. He came on at the 86th minute, and became a regular in the subs. Alianza Lima's new coach, the Chilean Miguel Ángel Arrué, who became the new club coach on 30 August 2007, started Manco in a friendly match, where he was captain of Alianza Lima. Manco became a regular for Arrué, coming on to play most of the time, being subbed in. Manco brings a lot of great football to Alianza, aiding in many of the goals by causing confusion in the opposing defense. Along with opening goalscoring chances for himself and his teammates. He had his first game as a starter against San Martin on 31 October 2007, but was subbed out in the 69th minute. He played his first Peruvian classic on 7 November 2007 against Universitario de Deportes, assisting the third goal in the 3–1 win of Alianza Lima. He scored his first professional goal against Coronel Bolognesi, after a great individual play in which he took on defenders and finished "like Messi" He helped Alianza Lima take a 3–2 victory in a very important game in the Torneo Clausura 2007 on 2 December 2007. Alianza was at first losing 0–2 and he came on as a substitute. The game took place in the Estadio Alejandro Villanueva in Matute, Alianza Lima's home stadium. It was rumored he would leave in the summer transfer window and many clubs were interested in him, including Werder Bremen, Real Madrid, Internazionale, Manchester United, Chelsea F.C., PSV Eindhoven, Liverpool F.C., and F.C. Barcelona. He eventually signed for PSV Eindhoven. In Winter 2009, he was signed by Willem II Tilburg on a loan fee that lasts until Summer 2009.

- Alianza Lima Statistics: 2007 Clausura

Games	Goals	Assists	Games Started	Games Subbed
15	1	5	2	13

- Alianza Lima Statistics: 2008 Apertura

Games	Goals	Assists	Games Started	Games Subbed
16	3'	5	5	9

=== PSV ===
On 10 February 2008, it was Reported that Manco had signed a five-year deal with PSV in the Netherlands. He joined the Eindhoven-side at the beginning of the 2008–09 season. PSV stated that Manco is a "very young and talented quality player." On 6 August 2008, he scored his first goal with PSV during a friendly match against Newcastle United. He took over the number 17 jersey from fellow Peruvian Jefferson Farfán, who was sold to Schalke 04. Manco debuted in the Dutch 1st division against Heerenveen, with PSV down 2–0. He came in on the 81st minute and with the first ball he touched he turned the tide for PSV, who had been dominated most of the second half. He assisted Danny Koevermans with a cross and was an important element in PSV's attack, with the match ending 2–2, ending PSV's bad run of five away defeats. He went on to play the next league match and a Champions League bout against Liverpool F.C. before he was loaned out to Willem II Tilburg.

=== Willem II ===
The Dutch national Champions gave him some time to get used to playing in the Eredivisie and loaned him to Willem II. Manco injured himself in practice however after only about 2 weeks with Willem II and lost the remainder of the season, having played 3 games for PSV just before he was loaned out, getting 1 assist. With Willem II he had and only played 2 matches before his injury.

=== Juan Aurich ===
On 23 December 2009 PSV Eindhoven decided to loan out Reimond Manco until June to Peruvian club Juan Aurich. Juan Aurich had the chance to play the Copa Libertadores, the equivalent of the UEFA Champions League in South America, which would give Manco some high-calibre matches, but first they would have to get through the first round against Mexican side Estudiantes Tecos. In Juan Aurich's only pre-season friendly Manco came on in the 32nd minute for injured winger William Chiroque. The first leg of the Copa Libertadores tie was in Juan Aurich's homeground, Chiclayo, where the Peruvians won 2–0 in a dominating game where Manco showcased his great skill and destroyed the struggling Mexican team's defense. Estudiantes Tecos, on a five-game losing streak, firmly believed they could win it at home and qualify to the second round, setting up the first goal on the 43rd minute, after beating two defenders on the right flank and crossing perfectly to Luis Tejeda's head, who had also scored the two goals in Peru. Defender Wily Rivas received a red card in the 64th minute and Estudiantes began to press the Peruvians, who tried to hold their ground in defense. The Mexican side came back to score a goal but it was not nearly enough and Juan Aurich entered the group stage of the Libertadores by defeating Estudiantes Tecos 4–1 on aggregate. On 17 March 2010 Reimond Manco was chosen as Man of the Match in a 4–2 Copa Libertadores win over as of then undefeated group leaders Alianza Lima, where he provided an assist and scored a goal. Finally Manco was bought by Juan Aurich's team on 15 July 2010.

Copa Libertadores stats

Games	Goals	Assists	Games Started	Substitute Appearances
6	1	2	5	1

=== León de Huánuco ===
After a disciplinary incident in Juan Aurich, Manco was transferred to León de Huánuco in the beginning of 2012. He was managed by Aníbal Ruiz. He would only play a few matches, leaving the club in May 2012 in order to play for Al Wakrah.

=== Universidad Tecnológica de Cajamarca ===
In 2013 it was revealed that Manco would play the 2013 Peruvian First Division season in Universidad Tecnológica de Cajamarca (UTC).

=== León de Huánuco ===
In 2015, he signed for León de Huánuco.

=== Return to Alianza Lima ===
In August 2015 he returned to Club Alianza Lima, after seven years.

== Honours ==
=== Club ===
Juan Aurich

- Peruvian First Division (1): 2011

=== Country ===
Peru U-17 national team

- 4th place in 2007 South American Under 17 Football Championship
- 8th place in 2007 FIFA U-17 World Cup

=== Individual ===
- Best player of the 2007 South American U-17 Football Championship
- One of the 25 best players in the 2007 FIFA U-17 World Cup

== See also ==
- Peru national under-17 football team
- Peru national football team
