= Alexis Machuca =

Argentine footballer

Personal information
- Full name: Alexis Maximiliano Machuca
- Date of birth: 10 May 1990 (age 36)
- Place of birth: Rosario, Argentina
- Height: 1.76 m (5 ft 9 in)
- Position: Centre-back

Team information
- Current team: Deportes Concepción
- Number: 3

Youth career
- Newell's Old Boys

Senior career*
Years	Team	Apps	(Gls)
2006–2012	Newell's Old Boys	35	(1)
2013–2017	Universidad de Concepción	61	(0)
2017–2018	Estudiantes (SL)	4	(0)
2018–2019	Gimnasia y Esgrima (J)	3	(0)
2020–2021	Santiago Morning	17	(1)
2021–	Deportes Concepción	5	(1)

International career
2006–2008	Argentina U17	6	(0)
2008–2010	Argentina U20	9	(0)
- * Club domestic league appearances and goals as of 29 September 2021

Alexis Maximiliano Machuca (born 10 May 1990 in Rosario) is an Argentine professional footballer who plays for Chilean side Deportes Concepción in the Segunda División as a defender.

== Honours ==
Universidad de Concepción

- Primera B: 2013 Transición
- Copa Chile: 2014–15
