= Raul (footballer, born 1990) =

Brazilian footballer

Personal information
- Full name: Raul Guilherme Martins
- Date of birth: 13 March 1990 (age 36)
- Place of birth: Curitiba, Brazil
- Height: 1.73 m (5 ft 8 in)
- Position: Right back

Team information
- Current team: Hermann Aichinger

Youth career
- 2005: Coritiba
- 2005–2010: Atlético Paranaense

Senior career*
| Years | Team | Apps | (Gls) |
| 2009–2011 | Atlético Paranaense | 15 | (0) |
| 2011 | → Joinville (loan) | | |
| 2012 | Botafogo-SP | | |
| 2012 | Fortaleza | | |
| 2012 | Boa | | |
| 2013 | Londrina | | |
| 2013– | Hermann Aichinger | | |
- * Club domestic league appearances and goals as of May 18, 2013 ‡ National team caps and goals as of October 16, 2010

Raul Guilherme Martins, better known as Raul (born 13 March 1990 in Curitiba), is a Brazilian footballer who plays as a right back.

== Career ==
He played in the base of the rival, Coritiba in 2005, the same year he arrived in Fin.

Had the first chance in professional Altet in 2009, playing Brazilian, almost all of that holder. In 2010 was not explained away by problems, returned to base. In 2010 it overcame the problems and returned to the club's professional team.

== Career statistics ==
(Correct as of October 16, 2010)

| Club | Season | State League | | Brazilian Série A | | Copa do Brasil | | Copa Libertadores | | Copa Sudamericana | | Total | |
| Club | Season | Apps | Goals | Apps | Goals | Apps | Goals | Apps | Goals | Apps | Goals | Apps | Goals |
|---|---|---|---|---|---|---|---|---|---|---|---|---|---|
| Atlético Paranaense | 2009 | - | - | 15 | 0 | - | - | - | - | - | - | 15 | 0 |
| Atlético Paranaense | 2010 | ? | 1 | 0 | 0 | - | - | - | - | - | - | ? | 1 |
| Total | | ? | 1 | 15 | 0 | - | - | - | - | - | - | ? | 1 |

== Contract ==
- Atlético Paranaense.

== Honours ==
=== Club ===
Atlético Paranaense

- Campeonato Paranaense: 2009

=== International ===
Brasil U-17

- Campeonato Sul Americano (U-17): 2005, 2007
