= Choco (footballer, born 4 January 1990) =

Brazilian footballer

Personal information
- Full name: João Guilherme Estevão da Silva
- Date of birth: 4 January 1990 (age 36)
- Place of birth: Paranaguá, Brazil
- Height: 1.76 m (5 ft 9 in)
- Position: Striker

Youth career
- 2007–2009: Atlético-PR

Senior career*
Years	Team	Apps	(Gls)
2009	Atlético-PR	1	(0)
2009–2010	→ Olimpi Rustavi (loan)	6	(0)
2010	→ Marília AC (loan)	0	(0)
2011	Rio Branco SC	6	(1)
2012	Batatais Futebol	6	(3)
2012–2013	Ribeirão	11	(5)
2013	Oberneuland	12	(2)
2013–2014	União da Madeira	8	(0)
2015	Esporte Clube XV de Novembro	0	(0)
2016	CRAC	6	(0)

International career
2007	Brazil U17	3	(1)
- * Club domestic league appearances and goals

João Guilherme Estevão da Silva or simply Choco (born 4 January 1990), is a Brazilian former professional footballer who played as a striker.

== Career ==
Choco was born in Paranaguá.

=== Atlético-PR ===
he made his professional debut with Atlético-PR in 1–1 home draw against Atlético Mineiro in Campeonato Brasileiro Série A on 25 May 2009.

=== Olimpi Rustavi ===
Choco made his debut for Olimpi Rustavi against Baia Zugdidi on 1 August 2009.

=== Rio Branco SC ===
Choco scored on his debut for Rio Branco SC against Cascavel on 23 January 2011, scoring in the 87th minute.

=== Batatais Futebol ===
Choco scored on his debut for Batatais against Barretos on 24 February 2012, scoring in the 90th+1st minute.

=== Ribeirão ===
Choco scored on his debut for Ribeirão against Fafe on 2 September 2012, scoring a penalty in the 85th minute.

=== União da Madeira ===
Choco made his debut for União da Madeira against Marítimo B on 29 January 2014.

=== XV de Piracicaba ===
Choco made his debut for XV de Piracicaba against União Barbarense on 8 August 2015.

=== CRAC ===
China played for CRAC against Goianésia on 3 February 2016.
