= Leandro Díaz (footballer, born 1990) =

Uruguayan footballer

Personal information
- Full name: Leandro Nicolás Díaz Baffico
- Date of birth: 24 March 1990 (age 36)
- Place of birth: Montevideo, Uruguay
- Height: 1.79 m (5 ft 10 in)
- Position: Defensive midfielder

Youth career
- Danubio

Senior career*
Years	Team	Apps	(Gls)
2008–2012	Danubio	26	(0)
2013–2014	Londrina EC	7	(1)
2014–2015	Deportes Melipilla	8	(2)
2015–2016	El Tanque Sisley	28	(1)
2017	Santiago Morning	4	(1)
2017	El Tanque Sisley	10	(0)
2018	Juventud Las Piedras	9	(1)
2020	La Luz	8	(0)
- * Club domestic league appearances and goals

Leandro Nicolás Díaz Baffico (born 24 March 1990) is a former Uruguayan footballer who played as a defensive midfielder.

== Career ==
He played for Deportes Melipilla during the 2014–15 Segunda División Profesional de Chile. In 2017, he returned to Chile and signed with Santiago Morning.

His last club was La Luz in 2020.
