= Isaac Donkor (footballer, born 1991) =

Ghanaian football player

Personal information
- Date of birth: 16 November 1991 (age 34)
- Place of birth: Sekondi-Takoradi, Ghana
- Height: 1.79 m (5 ft 10 in)
- Position: Midfielder

Youth career
- Sekondi Hasaacas F.C.

Senior career*
Years	Team	Apps	(Gls)
2006–2008	Sekondi Hasaacas F.C.		
2008–2011	Liberty Professionals F.C.		
2011	Aduana Stars		
2011–2012	Heart of Lions F.C.		
2012–	Sekondi Hasaacas F.C.		

International career
2007	Ghana U-17	5	(1)
- * Club domestic league appearances and goals as of 23 August 2008

Isaac Donkor (born 16 November 1991, in Sekondi-Takoradi) is a Ghanaian football player.

== Career ==
Donkor is a latest addition to the Liberty squad signing from Sekondi Hasaacas F.C. in summer 2008. The four except Donkor have been part of Liberty's squad for the just ended season and have had an impressive tournament ahead of the start of the season. In September 2009 left Liberty and signed for Aduana Stars, before joined only three months later to league rival Heart of Lions F.C. Donkor played for Heart of Lions, until June 2012 and returned than to his former club Sekondi Hasaacas F.C. He was released by his club Sekondi Hasaacas F.C. in July 2013.

== Qualities ==
Elegance, ability and effectiveness are his assets. A technical player with pace and good combination of both legs effectively. A clinical finisher, cool-headed and able to assume several responsibilities in times of need. He is fast and has the ability to go past his marker. Despite his youthfulness, he is good in the air and he is also used to dealing with defenders that are stronger and more experienced than him. His bursts of speed and his skill with the ball at his feet are two of his virtues. He is a natural playmaker, a box to box player who never complicate jobs given to him to do. However, his main strength is his killer instinct in front of goal.

== International career ==
He played for U-17 Ghana national team in 2007 FIFA U-17 World Cup in Korea Republic, he was one of the goalgetter and his goal against Brazil brought him the nickname Giant Killer.
