= Miguel Julio =

Colombian footballer (born 1991)

Personal information
- Full name: Miguel Ángel Julio Rossete
- Date of birth: 21 February 1991 (age 35)
- Place of birth: Santa Marta, Colombia
- Height: 1.81 m (5 ft 11 1/2 in)
- Position: Central midfielder

Team information
- Current team: Delfines del Este

Youth career
- 2007–2009: Independiente Medellín

Senior career*
Years	Team	Apps	(Gls)
2009–2012	Independiente Medellín	12	(0)
2012–2013	Trujillanos	0	(0)
2013–2014	América de Cali	13	(0)
2015–2016	Atlético Tucumán	25	(0)
2019	Moca		
2020	Club Real Deportivo		
2020–	Delfines del Este		

International career
- Colombia U15
2007	Colombia U17	12	(2)
2009–2011	Colombia U20	8	(0)
- * Club domestic league appearances and goals

Miguel Ángel Julio Rossete (born 21 February 1991) is a Colombian footballer who plays as a central midfielder for Delfines del Este.

== Club career ==
Julio began his footballing career in Colombia with Independiente Medellín of Categoría Primera A, he made his first-team debut on 20 February 2009 in a league encounter against Real Cartagena. Two more appearances came during the 2009 Apertura season before Julio appeared nine times more in the 2012 Apertura season. In 2012, Julio signed for Venezuelan Primera División team Trujillanos. A year later he completed a move back to Colombia to join América de Cali, fourteen appearances subsequently followed in the 2013 campaign. On 19 January 2015, Julio joined Primera B Nacional side Atlético Tucumán.

Julio participated in twenty-four matches for the club in 2015, as they won promotion into the 2016 Argentine Primera División. In December 2016, he was released by Tucumán. In 2019, Julio headed to the Dominican Republic to play for Moca in Liga Dominicana. He scored twice in the 2019 campaign. In 2020, after a spell with Serie B's Club Real Deportivo, Julio joined Delfines del Este.

== International career ==
Julio represented Colombia at U15, U17 and U20 levels. He scored two goals in twelve caps for the Under-17s, while he won eight caps for the Under-20s during two South American Youth Football Championship competitions in 2009 and 2011 respectively.

== Personal life ==
In June 2017, it was reported that Julio had attempted suicide. He was found face down in his apartment, though once hospitalised his condition wasn't critical; he had reportedly been suffering with depression and drug abuse.

== Career statistics ==
As of 12 November 2017.

Club statistics
Club	Season	League			Cup		League Cup		Continental		Other		Total	
Club	Season	Division	Apps	Goals	Apps	Goals	Apps	Goals	Apps	Goals	Apps	Goals	Apps	Goals
Independiente Medellín	2009	Categoría Primera A	3	0	0	0	—		0	0	0	0	3	0
Independiente Medellín	2010	Categoría Primera A	0	0	0	0	—		0	0	0	0	0	0
Independiente Medellín	2011	Categoría Primera A	0	0	2	0	—		—		0	0	2	0
Independiente Medellín	2012	Categoría Primera A	9	0	2	0	—		—		0	0	11	0
Independiente Medellín	Total		12	0	4	0	—		0	0	0	0	16	0
Trujillanos	2012–13	Venezuelan Primera División	0	0	0	0	—		—		0	0	0	0
América de Cali	2013	Categoría Primera B	13	0	0	0	—		—		1 (Note: Appearance(s) in the Categoría Primera A play-offs)	0	14	0
América de Cali	2014	Categoría Primera B	0	0	0	0	—		—		0	0	0	0
América de Cali	Total		13	0	0	0	—		—		1	0	14	0
Atlético Tucumán	2015	Primera B Nacional	24	0	1	0	—		—		0	0	25	0
Atlético Tucumán	2016	Argentine Primera División	0	0	0	0	—		—		0	0	0	0
Atlético Tucumán	2016–17	Argentine Primera División	1	0	0	0	—		0	0	0	0	1	0
Atlético Tucumán	Total		25	0	1	0	—		0	0	0	0	26	0
Career total			50	0	5	0	—		0	0	1	0	56	0

== Honours ==
Atlético Tucumán

- Primera B Nacional: 2015
