= Nicolás Mazzola =

Argentine footballer

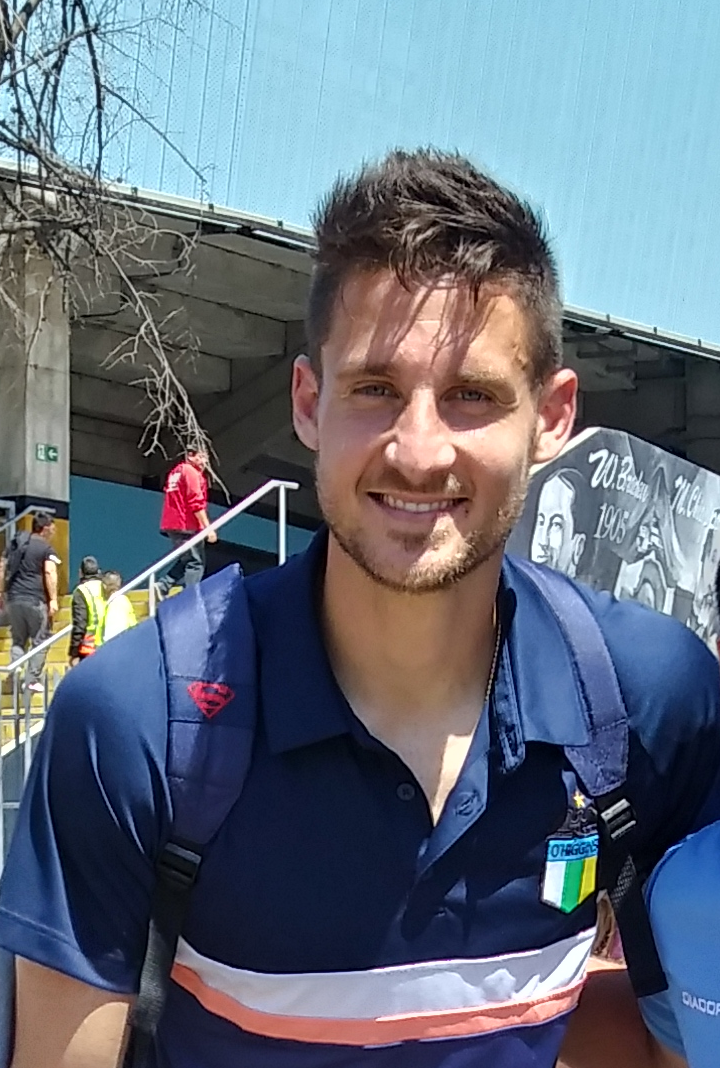

Personal information
- Full name: Nicolás Mario Mazzola
- Date of birth: 28 January 1990 (age 36)
- Place of birth: Viedma, Argentina
- Height: 1.88 m (6 ft 2 in)
- Position: Forward

Youth career
- Independiente

Senior career*
Years	Team	Apps	(Gls)
2009–2012	Independiente	5	(0)
2012–2014	Locarno	31	(5)
2014	Villa San Carlos	9	(2)
2014–2015	Instituto	17	(9)
2015–2018	Gimnasia LP	54	(12)
2018	→ O'Higgins (loan)	22	(8)
2019–2020	Unión	0	(0)
2020–2021	Panetolikos	14	(1)
2021	Arsenal de Sarandí	15	(0)
2022–2024	Instituto	19	(2)
2024	Xinabajul	18	(5)
- * Club domestic league appearances and goals as of 19:08, 25 July 2022 (UTC)

Nicolás Mazzola (born 28 January 1990) is an Argentine professional footballer who plays as a forward.
